= Kara discography =

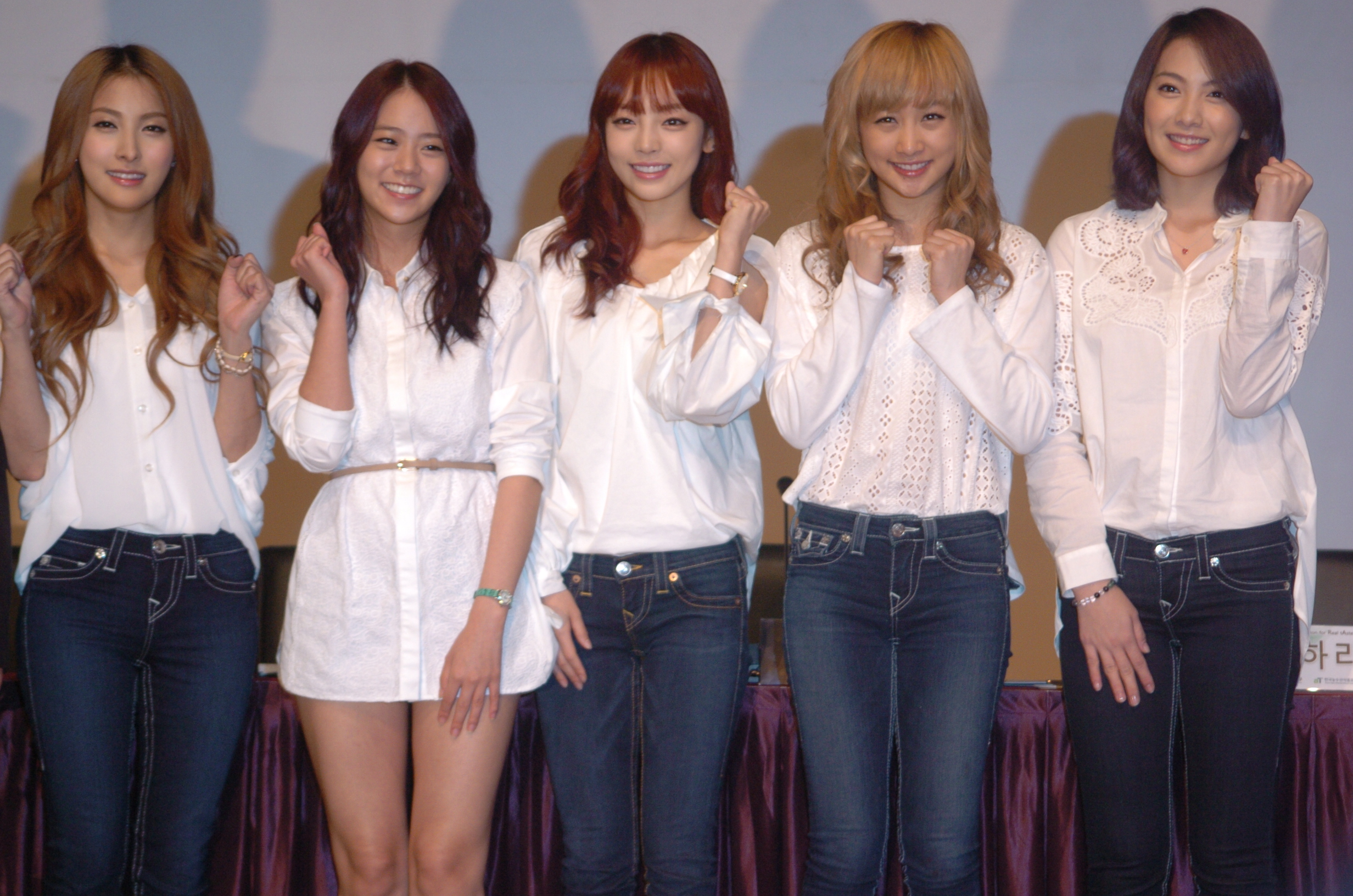
- Kara in 2012
- Studio albums: 9
- Extended plays: 8
- Compilation albums: 8
- Singles: 27
- Video albums: 22
- Music videos: 36

Kara has released nine studio albums (four in Korean and five in Japanese), eight compilation albums, seven extended plays, and twenty-eight singles. The group's debut studio album The First Blooming was released on March 29, 2007. They entered the Japanese music scene on August 5, 2010, with the Japanese version of "Mister". They also recorded soundtracks of various Korean and Japanese dramas.

== Albums ==
=== Korean studio albums ===
List of Korean studio albums by Kara
Title	Album details	Peak chart positions		Sales
Title	Album details	KOR	JPN	Sales
The First Blooming	Released: March 29, 2007; Label: DSP Media; Format: CD, digital download	2	—	KOR: 22,165 (Note: Sales figures are from 2010 and onward.)
Revolution	Released: July 30, 2009; Label: DSP Media; Format: CD, digital download	3	86	KOR: 55,940 (Note: Sales figures are from 2010 and onward.)
Step	Released: September 6, 2011; Label: DSP Media; Format: CD, digital download	1	5	KOR: 106,250
Full Bloom	Released: September 2, 2013; Label: DSP Media; Format: CD, digital download	1	25	KOR: 46,830
"—" denotes releases that did not chart or were not released in that region.

=== Japanese studio albums ===
List of Japanese studio albums by Kara
Title	Album details	Peak chart positions	Sales	Certifications
Title	Album details	JPN	Sales	Certifications
Girl's Talk	Released: November 24, 2010; Label: Universal Sigma; Format: CD, digital download	2	JPN: 443,491	RIAJ: 2× Platinum
Super Girl	Released: November 23, 2011; Label: Universal Sigma; Format: CD, digital download	1	JPN: 746,246	RIAJ: 3× Platinum
Girls Forever	Released: November 14, 2012; Label: Universal Sigma; Format: CD, digital download	2	JPN: 122,352	RIAJ: Platinum
Fantastic Girls	Released: August 28, 2013; Label: Universal Sigma; Format: CD, digital download	3	JPN: 57,041	
Girl's Story	Released: June 17, 2015; Label: EMI Music Japan; Format: CD, digital download	6	JPN: 19,170	

=== Compilation albums ===
List of compilation albums by Kara
Title	Album details	Peak chart positions		Sales	Certifications
Title	Album details	KOR	JPN	Sales	Certifications
Best 2007–2010	Released: September 29, 2010 (JPN); Label: Universal Sigma; Format: CD, digital download	—	2	JPN: 218,652	RIAJ: Platinum
Hits! Hits!	Released: March 30, 2012 (TWN); Record Label: Warner Music Taiwan; Format: CD/DVD	—	—		
Collection	Released: September 5, 2012 (JPN); Record Label: Universal Sigma; Format: CD/DVD	—	3	JPN: 71,328	
Solo Collection	Released: December 4, 2012 (KOR); Record Label: DSP Media; Format: CD/DVD	3	91	KOR: 14,575; JPN: 2,674	
Best Girls	Released: November 27, 2013 (JPN); Label: Universal Sigma; Format: CD/DVD	—	5	JPN: 65,228	RIAJ: Gold
"—" denotes releases that did not chart or were not released in that region.

=== Box sets ===
Title	Album details	Peak chart positions
Title	Album details	JPN
Special Premium Box for Japan	Released: April 28, 2010 (JPN); Label: Universal Sigma; Format: CD/DVD	29
Album Collection	Released: March 26, 2014 (JPN); Label: Universal Sigma; Format: CD/DVD	85
Single Collection	Released: March 26, 2014 (JPN); Label: Universal Sigma; Format: CD/DVD	87

== Extended plays ==
List of extended plays by Kara
Title	Details	Peak chart positions		Sales
Title	Details	KOR	JPN	Sales
Rock U	Released: July 25, 2008 (KOR); Label: DSP Media; Format: CD, digital download	8	106	KOR: 6,900; JPN: 1,188
Pretty Girl	Released: December 4, 2008 (KOR); Label: DSP Media; Format: CD, digital download	23	105	KOR: 5,520; JPN: 1,201
Lupin	Released: February 17, 2010 (KOR); Label: DSP Media; Format: CD, digital download	1	100	KOR: 75,197; JPN: 4,354
Jumping	Released: November 10, 2010 (KOR); Label: DSP Media; Format: CD, digital download	1	52	KOR: 60,217; JPN: 12,885
Pandora	Released: August 22, 2012 (KOR); Label: DSP Media; Format: CD, digital download	1	15	KOR: 70,425; JPN: 21,692
Day & Night	Released: August 18, 2014 (KOR); Label: DSP Media; Format: CD, digital download	3	26	KOR: 27,177; JPN: 9,269
In Love	Released: May 26, 2015 (KOR); Label: DSP Media; Format: CD, digital download	2	42	KOR: 13,220; JPN: 3,544
Move Again	Released: November 29, 2022 (KOR); Label: RBW; Format: CD, digital download, streaming	16	7	KOR: 20,128; JPN: 17,016
"—" denotes releases that did not chart or were not released in that region.

=== Reissues ===
List of reissue extended plays
Title	Album details	Peak chart positions		Sales
Title	Album details	KOR	JPN	Sales
Honey (Special Edition)	Released: February 12, 2009 (KOR); Label: DSP Media; Format: CD, digital download	2	103	KOR: 21,587; JPN: 1,249

== Singles ==
=== Korean singles ===
List of Korean singles by Kara
Title	Year	Peak chart positions					Sales (Note: Sales figures are digital sales)	Album
Title	Year	KOR	KOR Hot (Note: The Billboard K-pop Hot 100 was introduced in August 2011 and discontinued in July 2014.)	JPN Hot	JPN RIAJ (Note: RIAJ Digital Track Chart was shut down on July 27, 2012.)	US World	Sales	Album
"Break It"	2007	—	—	—	—	—		The First Blooming
"If U Wanna" (맘에 들면)	2007	—	—	—	—	—		The First Blooming
"Secret World"	2007	—	—	—	—	—		The First Blooming
"Rock U"	2008	—	—	—	—	—		Rock U
"Pretty Girl"	2008	—	—	—	—	—		Pretty Girl
"Honey"	2009	—	—	—	—	—		Honey
"Wanna"	2009	—	—	—	—	—		Revolution
"Mister"	2009	—	—	—	—	—		Revolution
"Lupin"	2010	1	—	—	—	—	KOR: 2,977,898; JPN: 100,000 (Gold)	Lupin
"Jumping"	2010	3	—	—	—	—	KOR: 1,390,227	Jumping
"Step"	2011	2	2	38	2	—	KOR: 2,782,566	Step
"Pandora"	2012	2	3	—	—	18	KOR: 1,503,346	Pandora
"Runaway" (둘 중에 하나)	2013	9	5	—	—	—	KOR: 247,728	Full Bloom
"Damaged Lady" (숙녀가 못 돼)	2013	4	9	—	—	—	KOR: 463,583	Full Bloom
"Mamma Mia!"	2014	10	—	—	—	14	KOR: 352,056	Day & Night
"Cupid"	2015	14	—	—	—	12	KOR: 245,523	In Love
"When I Move"	2022	13	8	—	—	—		Move Again
"Hello"	2024	— (Note: "Hello" did not enter the Circle Digital Chart, but appeared at number 30 on the component Download chart.)	—	—	—	—		Non-album single
"I Do I Do"	2024	— (Note: "I Do I Do" did not enter the Circle Digital Chart, but appeared at number 9 on the component Download chart.)	—	—	—	—		Non-album single
"—" denotes releases that did not chart or were not released in that region.

=== Japanese singles ===
List of Japanese singles by Kara
Title	Year	Peak chart positions			Sales (Note: Korean sales figures are digital sales measured by Gaon Music Chart and Japanese figures are CD single sales measured by Oricon)	Certifications (Note: Japan is a certification by RIAJ)	Album
Title	Year	JPN	JPN Hot	JPN RIAJ	Sales	Certifications	Album
"Mister"	2010	5	11	2	JPN: 144,856	RIAJ: Gold (phy.); Million (dig.); 3× Platinum (rt.)	Girl's Talk
"Jumping"	2010	5	3	11	JPN: 119,727	RIAJ: Gold (phy.); Million (dig.); 3× Platinum (rt.)	Girl's Talk
"Jet Coaster Love"	2011	1	2	1	JPN: 225,521	RIAJ: Gold (phy.); Platinum (rt.); Gold (dig.)	Super Girl
"Go Go Summer!"	2011	2	2	1	JPN: 230,813	RIAJ: Gold (phy.); 2× Platinum (rt.); Platinum (dig.)	Super Girl
"Winter Magic"	2011	3	2	2	JPN: 124,965	RIAJ: Gold (phy.); Gold (rt.)	Super Girl
"Speed Up"	2012	2	3	6	JPN: 158,613	RIAJ: Gold (phy.)	Girls Forever
"Girl's Power"	2012	2	7	6	JPN: 158,613	RIAJ: Gold (phy.)	Girls Forever
"Electric Boy"	2012	2	1	—	JPN: 76,248	RIAJ: Gold (phy.)	Girls Forever
"Bye Bye Happy Days!"	2013	2	2	—	JPN: 78,325		Fantastic Girls
"Thank You Summer Love"	2013	2	1	—	JPN: 75,884		Fantastic Girls
"French Kiss"	2013	7	24	—	JPN: 35,505		Best Girls
"Mamma Mia!"	2014	6	9	—	JPN: 31,864		Girl's Story
"Summer☆Gic"	2015	2	4	—	JPN: 55,108		Girl's Story
"Sunshine Miracle"	2015	2	—	—	JPN: 55,108		Girl's Story
"Sunny Days"	2015	2	—	—	JPN: 55,108		Girl's Story
"When I Move"	2022	—	— (Note: "When I Move (Japanese ver.)" did not enter the Billboard Japan Hot 100 Chart, but appeared at number 82 on the Download Songs chart.)	—			Move Again
"I Do I Do"	2024	7	95	—	JPN: 23,128		Non-album single
"—" denotes releases that did not chart or were not released in that region.

=== Promotional singles ===
Title	Year	Peak chart positions				Album
Title	Year	KOR	KOR Hot	JPN Hot	JPN RIAJ	Album
"Good Day: Season 2"	2008	33	—	—	—	Honey (Special Edition)
"Same Heart"	2009	24	—	—	—	Revolution
"Stars Falling from the Sky"	2010	47	—	—	—	Stars Falling from the Sky
"We're With You" (Note: released as standalone single. The song was also later included on the physical edition of Super Girl Japan Tour Special Edition.)	2010	14	—	—	24	Non-album singles
"2Me"	2010	29	—	—	—	Non-album singles
"Dreaming Girl"	2011	—	—	28	—	Super Girl
"Go Go Summer! 2012"	2012	—	—	68	49	Collection
"Beautiful Night" (Note: "Beautiful Night" / "Love Letter" was released December 11, 2013, in Japan and Korea with the title "KARA The Animation" on December 24, 2013.)	2013	51	44	—	—	Non-album singles
"Love Letter"	2013	—	—	—	—	Non-album singles
"—" denotes releases that did not chart or were not released in that region.

== Other charted songs ==
Title	Year	Peak chart positions			Album
Title	Year	KOR	KOR Hot	JPN RIAJ	Album
"Umbrella"	2010	33	—	—	Lupin
"Tasty Love"	2010	48	—	—	Lupin
"Lonely"	2010	57	—	—	Lupin
"Rollin'"	2010	61	—	—	Lupin
"Love Is"	2010	— (Note: "Love Is" did not enter the Circle Digital Chart, but debuted and peaked at number 81 on the component Download Chart.)	—	—	Jumping
"SOS"	2010	—	—	17	Girl's Talk
"Lupin" (Japan ver.)	2010	—	—	55	Girl's Talk
"Rider"	2011	43	69	—	Step
"Strawberry"	2011	55	83	—	Step
"Follow Me" (따라와)	2011	78	—	—	Step
"Date (My Boy)"	2011	82	—	—	Step
"I Am... (Ing)"	2011	— (Note: "I Am... (Ing)" did not enter the Circle Digital Chart, but debuted and peaked at number 92 on the component Download Chart.)	—	—	Step
"Ima, Okuritai 「Arigatou」"	2011	—	—	16	Super Girl
"Girls Be Ambitious!"	2011	—	—	42	Super Girl
"Winter Magic (X'mas version)"	2011	—	—	67	Winter Magic (single)
"Do It! Do It!"	2011	—	—	67	Super Girl
"Missing"	2011	—	—	98	Super Girl
"Way"	2012	58	35	—	Pandora
"Miss U" (그리운 날엔)	2012	88	64	—	Pandora
"Idiot"	2012	— (Note: "Idiot" did not enter the Circle Digital Chart, but debuted and peaked at number 81 on the component Download Chart.)	87	—	Pandora
"Lost"	2012	85	68	—	Solo Collection
"Secret Love"	2012	82	74	—	Solo Collection
"2Night"	2013	98	98	—	Full Bloom
"Follow Me"	2013	— (Note: "Follow Me" did not enter the Circle Digital Chart, but debuted and peaked at number 97 on the component Download Chart.)	—	—	Full Bloom
"—" denotes releases that did not chart or were not released in that region.

== Guest appearances ==
Title	Year	Other performer(s)	Album
"Gil" (길)	2010		MBC Music Travel LaLaLa Vol.7 (Digital Single)
"Round and Round" (빙글 빙글)	2010	No Brain	MBC Music Travel LaLaLa Vol.11 (Digital Single)
"I'll Write You a Letter" (편지할께요)	2011	Kim Hyung Suk	2011 Kim Hyung Suk With Friends Part.1
"White"	2014	Rainbow, Oh Jong-hyuk, Ajax, DSP Girls (So-min and Chae Won)	DSP Special Album: White Letter
"My Angel"	2014		DSP Special Album: White Letter
"First Love" (첫 사랑)	2014	Park Gyu-ri, Han Seung-yeon	DSP Special Album: White Letter
"Into The World" (세상속으로)	2014		DSP Special Album: White Letter

== Soundtracks ==
Title	Year	Soundtracks from	Album
"Fighting"	2007	Keeping Up with Gangnam Mother (강남엄마 따라잡기)	Keeping Up with Gangnam Mother OST
"Butterfly" (나비)	2008	Naruto Shippuden (Korean version)	—N/a
"Love is Fire"	2009	Boys Over Flowers	Boys Over Flowers Original Sound Track: Part 2
"Stars Falling from the Sky" (별을 따다줘)	2010	Stars Falling from the Sky	Stars Falling from the Sky OST
"Lonely"	2010	My Mother	Lupin
"SOS"	2011	URAKARA	Girl's Talk
"Ima, Okuridai Arigatou"	2011	URAKARA	Super Girl
"My Prayer"	2012	Strangers 6	—N/a
"Beautiful Night"	2013	KARA The Animation	Bye Bye Happy Days!
"Love Letter"	2013	KARA The Animation	Thank You Summer Love
"My Angel" (Secret Love ver.)	2014	Secret Love	Non-album song
"Into The World" (세상속으로) (Secret Love ver.)	2014	Secret Love	Non-album song

== Video albums ==
Year	Title	Album details	Sales	Certifications
2009	KARAdise 2010 Season's Greeting	Release date: December 8, 2009; Label: DSP Media; Format: DVD		
2010	MBC DVD Collection: Kara Sweet Muse Gallery	Release date: May 19, 2010 (Japan); May 27, 2010 (South Korea); Label: Universal Sigma; Format: DVD	JPN: 13,000	
2010	KARAFULL DVD-BOX	Release date: August 4, 2010; Label: Esupio; Format: DVD		
2010	KARA Vacation	Release date: September 1, 2010; Label: Universal Sigma; Format: Hybrid DVD/Blu-ray	JPN: 2,300	
2010	KARAdise 2011 Season's Greeting From Thai	Release date: December 23, 2010 (South Korea); January 26, 2011 (Japan); Label: DSP Media/Universal Sigma; Format: DVD	JPN: 11,000	
2011	Kara Best Clips	Release date: February 23, 2011; February 29, 2012 (Blu-ray); Label: Universal Sigma; Format: DVD/Blu-ray	Total: 289,276; DVD: 286,889; Blu-ray: 2,387	RIAJ: Platinum
2011	URAKARA Vol.1-Vol.6	Release date: April 4, 2011; Label: Universal Sigma; Format: DVD	JPN: 36,200	
2011	KARA Vacation 2	Release date: December 21, 2011; Label: Universal Sigma; Format: Hybrid DVD/Blu-ray	Total: 13,628; DVD: 6,607; Blu-ray: 7,021	
2011	KARA Bakery With Photo DVD	Release date: December 23, 2011; Label: Esupio; Format: DVD		
2012	KARAdise 2012, In Paris	Release date: January 25, 2012; Label: SBS Contents Hub; Format: DVD		
2012	Step It Up	Release date: February 15, 2012; Label: December32; Format: DVD	JPN: 21,500	
2012	Kara Best Clips II & Shows	Release date: February 29, 2012; Label: Universal Sigma; Format: DVD / Blu-ray	Total: 137,890; DVD: 108,382; Blu-ray: 29,508	RIAJ: Gold
2012	Kara 1st Japan Tour 2012 Karasia	Release date: November 14, 2012; Label: Universal Sigma; Format: DVD / Blu-ray	Total: 60,008; DVD: 44,138; Blu-ray: 15,870	
2012	2012 The 1st Concert Karasia	Release date: December 26, 2012 (Japan); February 22, 2013 (South Korea); Label: DSP Media; Format: DVD	JPN: 9,830	
2013	Kara 2013 HAPPY NEW YEAR in TOKYO DOME	Release date: March 27, 2013; Label: Universal Sigma; Format: DVD / Blu-ray	Total: 34,385; DVD: 20,894; Blu-ray: 13,491	
2013	Kara The Animation	Release date: May 10, 2013; Label: Universal Sigma; Format: DVD		
2013	Kara Best Clips III	Release date: June 26, 2013; Label: Universal Sigma; Format: DVD / Blu-ray	Total: 20,160; DVD: 12,192; Blu-ray: 7,968	
2014	The Final Show: Kara 2nd Japan Tour 2013 Karasia	Release date: March 19, 2014; Label: Universal Sigma; Format: DVD / Blu-ray	Total: 20,431; DVD: 11,362; Blu-ray: 9,069	
2014	Secret Love DVD Box	Release date: September 24, 2014; Label: Universal Sigma; Format: DVD	Total: 1,760	
2014	KARA ~Day & Night~ Showcase	Release date: December 3, 2014; Label: Universal Sigma; Format: DVD	Total: 2,458	
2015	KARA The 3rd Japan Tour KARASIA	Release date: March 18, 2015; Label: Universal Sigma; Format: DVD / Blu-ray	Total: 10,022; DVD: 4,859; Blu-ray: 5,193	
2015	Kara the Fit	Release date: July 29, 2015; Label: EMI Records; Format: DVD		
2015	KARA The 4th Japan Tour 2015 KARASIA	Release date: December 16, 2015; Label: Universal Sigma; Format: DVD / Blu-ray		
2016	Forever Kara Blu-ray Complete Box 2010-2015 - All Japan Tours & Clips	Release date: June 29, 2016; Label: Universal Sigma, EMI Records; Format: Blu-ray box set		

== Photobooks ==
Year	Title	Release date	Sales
2011	KARA's All about Beauty	October 12, 2011	12,008
2012	Je t'aime KARA	February 14, 2012	Unknown
2012	KARASIA Program Book	March 28, 2012	Unknown
2012	KARA STEP IT UP Special Photobook	December 20, 2012	Unknown

== Music videos ==
Year	Music video	Other version	Director(s)
2007	"Break It"		Unknown
2007	"If U Wanna"		Unknown
2008			Unknown
2008	"Rock U"		Unknown
2008	"Pretty Girl"		Hibernation
2008	"Good Day: Season 2"		Unknown
2009	"Honey"		Joo Hee-sun
2009	"Same Heart"		Unknown
2009	"Wanna"		Unknown
2010	"Lupin"		Unknown
2010	"We're With You"	Gyuri off-shot version; Hara off-shot version; JiYoung off-shot version; Nicole off-shot version; SeungYeon off-shot version	Unknown
2010	"2Me"		Unknown
2010	"Mister"	Dance version	Unknown
2010	"Jumping"	Japanese version; Dance version; Smart Sports version; Gyuri off-shot version; Hara off-shot version; JiYoung off-shot version; Nicole off-shot version; SeungYeon off-shot version	Hong Won-ki
2011	"Jet Coaster Love"	Dance version	Joo Hee-sun
2011	"Ima, Okuritai 「Arigatou」"		Joo Hee-sun
2011	"Go Go Summer!"	Director's Cut version; Dance version	Joo Hee-sun
2011	"I'll Write You a Letter"		Joo Hee-sun
2011	"Step"	Close-Up version; Stage version; Street version; White version; Gyuri off-shot version; Hara off-shot version; JiYoung off-shot version; Nicole off-shot version; SeungYeon off-shot version	Joo Hee-sun
2011	"Winter Magic"	Close-Up version; Gyuri off-shot version; Hara off-shot version; JiYoung off-shot version; Nicole off-shot version; SeungYeon off-shot version	Joo Hee-sun
2012	"Speed Up"	Another version; Close-Up version	Joo Hee-sun
2012	"Girl's Power"	Close-Up version; Dance version	Joo Hee-sun
2012	"Pandora"	Dance version	Joo Hee-sun
2012	"Electric Boy"	Close-Up version; Dance version; Gyuri off-shot version; Hara off-shot version; JiYoung off-shot version; Nicole off-shot version; SeungYeon off-shot version	Unknown
2012	"Orion"	Close-up version	Unknown
2013	"Bye Bye Happy Days"	Dance version	Joo Hee-sun
2013	"Thank You Summer Love"	Dance version; Gyuri version; SeungYeon version; Nicole version; Hara version; JiYoung version	Joo Hee-sun
2013	"Runaway"		Kim Kyu-tae
2013	"Damaged Lady"		Cho Soo-hyun
2013	"French Kiss"	Dance version; Gyuri version; SeungYeon version; Nicole version; Hara version; JiYoung version	Hong Won-ki
2014	"Mamma Mia"	Japanese version; Dance version	Hong Won-ki
2015	"Summer☆Gic"	Dance version	Hong Won-ki
2015	"Cupid"		Digipedi
2022	"When I Move"	Japanese version	Hong Won-ki
2024	"I Do I Do"		AEDIA STUDIO
2024	"I Do I Do"	Japanese version	
