= List of songs recorded by Kara =

This is a complete list of songs by the Korean girl group Kara.

== 0–9 ==
Song	Writer	Album	Year	Other spellings	Other versions
"2Me"	Joo Young-Hoon	Go Go Summer! (single)	2010	"To Me"	Music video version

== A ==
Song	Writer	Album	Year
"Aha"	Song Soo Yun	Revolution	2009

== B ==
Song	Writer	Album	Year
"Baby Boy"	Kim Hyun Seo	Rock U	2008
"Baby I Need You"	Natsumi Watanabe	Girl's Talk	2010
"Beautiful Night"	Kim Won-hyun	Bye Bye Happy Days! (single)	2013
"Binks"	Song Soo Yun (Korean)	Jumping	2010
"Binks"	Song Soo Yun, PA-NON (Japanese)	Girl's Talk	2010
"Break It"	Lee Dong Soo, Han Sang Won	The First Blooming	2007
"Broken Promise"	Kim Tae Yoon	The First Blooming	2007
"Burn"	Song Soo Yun (Korean)	Jumping	2010
"Burn"	Song Soo Yun, Kenn Kato (Japanese)	Girl's Talk	2010
"Bye Bye Happy Days!"	Simon Isogai	Fantastic Girls	2013

== D ==
Song	Writer	Album	Year	Other versions
"Date (My Boy)"	Noneun Eorini	Step	2011	Japanese version ("My Boy")
"Do It! Do It!"	Mohombi Moupondo, Victoria Sandstrom, Joachim Alte, Tom Roger Rogstad, Litz, Emyli	Super Girl	2011	—
"Don't Be Shy"	Jung Mi Ra	The First Blooming	2007	—
"Dreamin' Girl"	Litz	Super Girl	2011	—

== E ==
Song	Writer	Album	Year
"Electric Boy"	Shalamon Baskin, Mikko Tamminen, Faya, Emyli	Girls Forever	2012
"Ey! Oh!"	Park Se Hyun, Yoo Hyun-Sang, Jang Jae Min	Step	2011

== F ==
Song	Writer	Album	Year
"Follow Me"	Zig Zag Note	Step	2011

== G ==
Song	Writer	Album	Year	Other versions
"Gimme Gimme"	Natsumi Watanabe, Emyli	Girls Forever	2012	—
"Girls Be Ambitious"	Hwang Seong Je	Super Girl	2011	—
"Girl's Power"	Han Sang Won	Girls Forever	2012	—
"Go Go Summer!"	Han Sang Won	Super Girl	2011	2012 version
"Good Day"	Han Jae-Ho	Rock U	2008	"Good Day: Season 2"

== H ==
Song	Writer	Album	Year	Other versions
"Hanabi"	Litz, NA.ZU.NA	Fantastic Girls	2013	—
"Happy Hour"	Park Gyu-ri, Han Seung-yeon, Nicole, Kang Ji-young, Heo Young-ji, Hollin (MonoTree)	Move Again	2022	
"Honey"	Han Jae-Ho, Kim Seung-Soo	Pretty Girl; Honey	2008	Version II; Japanese version

== I ==
Song	Writer	Album	Year	Other versions
"Idiot"	Hwang-hyun, Song Soo Yun	Pandora	2012	—
"I'll Be There"	Bang Seun Chul	The First Blooming	2007	—
"I'm... (Ing)"	Kim Bo-Ah, Lee Joohyung	Pretty Girl	2008	Acoustic version
"If U Wanna"	Han Sang Won, Lee Dong Soo	The First Blooming	2007	—
"Ima, Okuritai 'Arigatō'"	Simon Isogai	Super Girl	2011	Korean version ("With My Heart (Dear Kamilia)")
"Innocent Girl"	Yu Shimoji, Emyli	Girls Forever	2012	—

== J ==
Song	Writer	Album	Year	Other versions
"Jet Coaster Love"	Hwang Seong Je	Super Girl	2011	2012 version
"Jumping"	Han Jae-Ho, Kim Seung-Soo, Natsumi Watanabe (Japanese)	Girl's Talk	2010	—
"Jumping"	Han Jae-Ho, Kim Seung-Soo, Song Soo Yun (Korean)	Jumping	2010	—

== K ==
Song	Writer	Album	Year
"Kara 4 U"	Park Se Hyun, Yoo Hyun-Sang, Jang Jae Min	Step	2011
"Kiss Me Tonight"	Kenn Kato	Girls Forever	2012

== L ==
Song	Writer	Album	Year
"Let It Go"	Lee Seung Min	Revolution	2009
"Lonely"	Song Soo Yun	Lupin	2010
"Love Is"	Han Jae-Ho, Kim Seung-Soo, Song Soo Yun (Korean)	Jumping	2010
"Love Is"	Han Jae-Ho, Kim Seung-Soo, Narumi (Japanese)	Girl's Talk	2010
"Love Letter"	Kim Won-hyun	Thank You Summer Love (Single)	2013
"Lupin"	Han Jae-Ho, Kim Seung-Soo, Song Soo Yun (Korean)	Lupin	2010
"Lupin"	Han Jae-Ho, Kim Seung-Soo, Natsumi Watanabe (Japanese)	Girl's Talk	2010

== M ==
Song	Writer	Album	Year	Other versions
"Magic"	Song Soo Yun	Revolution	2009	—
"Miss U"	Song Soo Yun	Pandora	2012	—
"Missing"	Jam9, ArmySlick	Super Girl	2011	—
"Mister"	Han Jae-Ho, Kim Seung-Soo, Song Soo Yun (Korean)	Revolution	2009	—
"Mister"	Han Jae-Ho, Kim Seung-Soo, Natsumi Watanabe, PA-NON (Japanese)	Girl's Talk	2010	—
"My Boy"	Jang Sang Huk	Fantastic Girls	2013	Korean version "Date (My Boy)"
"My Darling"	Kim Bo-Ah, Lee Joohyung	Pretty Girl	2008	
"Mamma Mia"	Duble Sidekick		2014	

== O ==
Song	Writer	Album	Year
"Only for You"	EMI K.Lynn	Super Girl	2011
"Oops!"	Shihomi	Girls Forever	2012
"Orion"	Simon Isogai	Girls Forever	2012
"Oxygen"	Kim Su-bin (Aiming), Kang	Move Again	2022

== P ==
Song	Writer	Album	Year	Other versions
"Pandora"	Han Jae-Ho, Kim Seung-Soo	Pandora	2012	—
"Pretty Girl"	Han Jae-Ho, Kim Seung-Soo	Pretty Girl	2008	Bani version Japanese version School Rock version

== R ==
Song	Writer	Album	Year
"Rider"	Yoo Hyun-Sang, Jang Jae Min	Step	2011
"Rock On"	Ivar Lisinski, Robert Hanna, Ninos Hanna, Yui Kimura	Girls Forever	2012
"Rock U"	Han Jae-Ho, Kim Seung-Soo	Rock U	2008
"Rollin'"	Han Sang-Won	Lupin	2010
"Red Light"	Duble Sidekick	Mamma Mia	2014

== S ==
Song	Writer	Album	Year	Other versions
"Same Heart"	Song Soo Yun	Revolution	2009	—
"Secret World"	Kim Hee Sun, Cha Sang Min	The First Blooming	2007	—
"Secretly Secretly"	Im-Yeong	Revolution	2009	—
"Shake It Up"	Reed Vertelney, Lindy Robbins, Litz	Girls Forever	2012	
"Shout it Out"	Steven Lee, DearS, Young, Nicole	Move Again	2022	
"SOS"	Shoko Fujibayashi	Girl's Talk	2010	Army Slick 2011's Bavtronic Mix
"Speed Up"	Emyli	Girls Forever	2012	—
"Step"	Han Jae-Ho, Kim Seung-Soo, Song Soo Yun (Korean)	Step	2011	—
"Step"	Han Jae-Ho, Kim Seung-Soo, PA-NON, Kyasu Mochizuki (Japanese)	Speed Up / Girl's Power (single)	2012	—
"Strawberry"	Zig Zag Note	Step	2011	—
"Sweet Days"	Song Soo Yun, Kaori Moriwaka	Girl's Talk	2010	Korean version ("With")

== T ==
Song	Writer	Album	Year
"Thank You Summer Love"	Yu Shimoji	Fantastic Girls	2013
"Tasty Love"	Song Soo Yun	Lupin	2010
"Take a Bow"	Song Soo Yun	Revolution	2009
"Tear Eraser"	Yoon Gyung	The First Blooming	2007
"Two of Us"	Han Sang Won, Lee Dong Soo	The First Blooming	2007

== U ==
Song	Writer	Album	Year
"Umbrella"	Han Jae-ho, Kim Seung-soo, Song Soo Yun (Korean)	Lupin	2010
"Umbrella"	Han Jae-ho, Kim Seung-soo, Natsumi Watanabe (Japanese)	Girl's Talk	2010

== W ==
Song	Writer	Album	Year	Other versions
"Wait"	Hwang Seong Je	Rock U	2008	—
"Wanna"	Song Soo Yun	Revolution	2009	Japanese version
"Way"	Song Soo Yun	Pandora	2012	—
"What's This"	Song Soo Yun	Rock U	2008	Plastic version
"When I Move"	Hadar Adora, Anton Goransson, Isabella Sjostrand, Brandon "B Ham" Hamlin., Young, Kang, Kim Bo-ah, Nicole	Move Again	2022	
"We're with You"	Han Jae-Ho, Kim Seung-Soo	Super Girl: Japan Tour Special Edition	2010	Remix version
"Whisper"	Nice73	Super Girl	2011	—
"Winter Magic"	Simon Isogai	Super Girl	2011	X'mas version 2012 version
"With"	Song Soo Yun	Jumping	2010	Japanese version ("Sweet Days")
"With My Heart (Dear Kamilia)"	Simon Isogai	Step	2011	Japanese version ("Ima, Okuritai 'Arigatō'")

== Y ==
Song	Writer	Album	Year
"Yodel"	E-Tribe	Pretty Girl	2008

== Other songs ==
Song	Album	Year
"Butterfly"	None	2008
"Fighting"	Catching A Kang Nam Mother OST	2007
"I'll Write You a Letter"	2011 Kim Hyung Suk With Friends Part.1	2011
"Love is Fire"	Boys Over Flowers OST	2009
"Road"	None	2010
"Stars Falling From the Sky"	Stars Falling From the Sky OST	2010

== See also ==
- Kara discography
