= List of awards and nominations received by Kara =

Kara awards and nominations
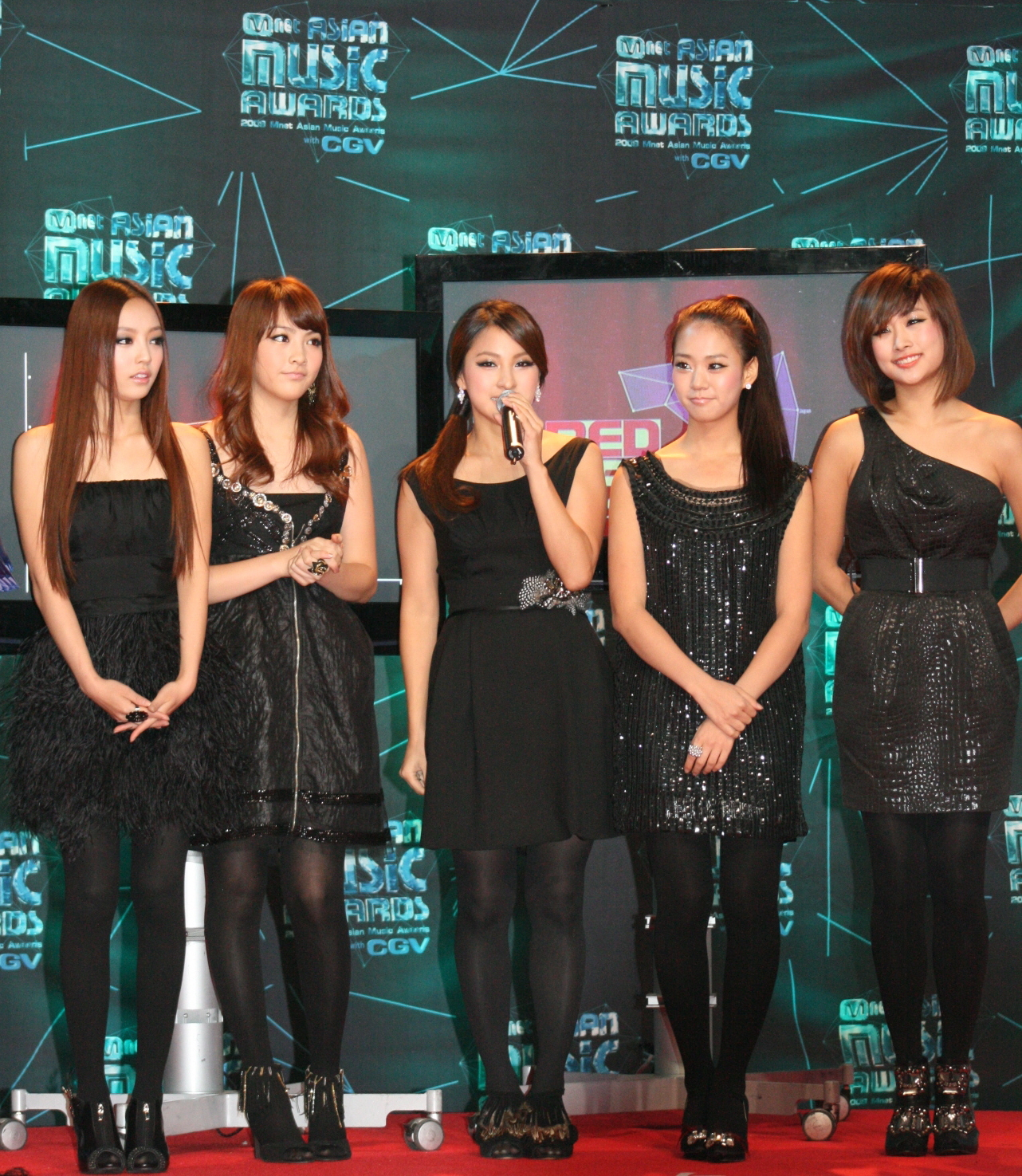
- Kara at the 2009 Mnet Asian Music Awards
Awards and nominations
Award	Wins	Nominations
Asia Song Festival	3	3
Circle Chart Music	1	1
Cyworld Digital Music	2	2
Golden Disc	4	11
Japan Gold Disc	10	10
MAMA	2	10
Melon Music	1	13
Mnet 20's Choice	1	1
MTV Korea	2	4
Seoul Music	3	15
World Music	2	4
Japan Record Awards	2	3
Style Icon Awards	0	3
Other awards	15	16

Totals (Note: Certain award groups do not simply award one winner. They acknowledge several different recipients, have runners-up, and have third place. Since this is a specific recognition and is different from losing an award, runner-up mentions are considered wins in this award tally. For simplification and to avoid errors, each award in this list has been presumed to have had a prior nomination.)
- Wins: 42
- Nominations: 90

This is the list of awards received by Kara, a South Korean girl group formed by DSP Media in 2007.

== Awards and nominations ==
Name of the award ceremony, year presented, category, nominee(s) of the award, and the result of the nomination
Award ceremony	Year	Category	Nominee / work	Result	Ref.
Asia Association Music Prize	2011	Album of the Year	Step	Nominated	
Asia Model Awards	2012	Asia Star Award	Kara	Won	
Asia Song Festival	2009	Asian Best Group	Kara	Won	
Asia Song Festival	2010	Asian Best Group	Kara	Won	
Asia Song Festival	2011	Asian Best Group	Kara	Won	
Cyworld Digital Music Awards	2007	Rookie of the Month (July)	"If U Wanna"	Won	
Cyworld Digital Music Awards	2009	Top 10 Bonsang	Kara	Won	
Gaon Chart Music Awards	2014	K-pop World Hallyu Star Award	Kara	Won	
Golden Disc Awards	2009	Album Bonsang	Revolution	Nominated	
Golden Disc Awards	2009	Samsung YEPP Popularity Award	Revolution	Nominated	
Golden Disc Awards	2010	Digital Song Bonsang	Lupin	Nominated	
Golden Disc Awards	2010	Popularity Award	Lupin	Nominated	
Golden Disc Awards	2012	Album of the Year	Step	Nominated	
Golden Disc Awards	2012	Album Bonsang	Step	Won	
Golden Disc Awards	2012	Most Popular Artist Award	Step	Nominated	
Golden Disc Awards	2012	Best K-Pop Award in Disk Album	Step	Won	
Golden Disc Awards	2013	Album Bonsang	Pandora	Won	
Golden Disc Awards	2013	Popularity Award	Pandora	Nominated	
Golden Disc Awards	2013	Malaysia's Most Favorite Star Award	Pandora	Won	
Japan Fashion Association	2011	2011 Best Dressed Award	Kara	Won	
Japan Gold Disc Awards	2011	New Artist of the Year	Kara	Won	
Japan Gold Disc Awards	2011	The Best 3 New Artists (International)	Kara	Won	
Japan Gold Disc Awards	2012	Best Asian Artist	Kara	Won	
Japan Gold Disc Awards	2012	Best 3 Albums (Asian)	Girl's Talk	Won	
Japan Gold Disc Awards	2012	Song of the Year by Download (Asian)	"Jumping"	Won	
Japan Gold Disc Awards	2012	Best 5 Songs by Download	"Jumping"	Won	
Japan Gold Disc Awards	2012	Best Music Videos	Kara Best Clips	Won	
Japan Gold Disc Awards	2013	Album of the Year	Super Girl	Won	
Japan Gold Disc Awards	2013	Best 3 Albums (Asian)	Super Girl	Won	
Japan Gold Disc Awards	2013	Best Asian Artist	Kara	Won	
Japan Record Awards	2010	Project Award	Kara Special Premium Box for Japan	Won	
Japan Record Awards	2011	Excellence Award	"Go Go Summer!"	Won	
Japan Record Awards	2011	Record of the Year	"Go Go Summer!"	Nominated	
Japan Best Jewellery Wearer Awards	2012	Special Award for Female Category: Singer	Kara	Won	
J-Melo Awards	2011	Best Crossover Artist or Group Into Japan	Kara	Won	
Korea Entertainment 10th Anniversary Awards	2013	Best Girl Group	Kara	Won	
Korean Entertainment Arts Awards	2010	Best Female Singer	Kara	Won	
Korean Ministry of Culture and Tourism	2011	Content Industry Award (Special Honor)	Kara	Won	
Korea Tourism Awards	2012	Achievement Award	Kara	Won	
Melon Music Awards	2009	Top 10 Artists	Kara	Won	
Melon Music Awards	2009	Artist of the Year	Kara	Nominated	
Melon Music Awards	2009	Star Award	Kara	Nominated	
Melon Music Awards	2009	Mobile Music Award	Kara	Nominated	
Melon Music Awards	2009	Mania Award	Kara	Nominated	
Melon Music Awards	2009	Smart Radio Award	Kara	Nominated	
Melon Music Awards	2009	Current Stream Award	Kara	Nominated	
Melon Music Awards	2010	Top 10 Artists	Kara	Nominated	
Melon Music Awards	2010	Song of the Year	"Lupin"	Nominated	
Melon Music Awards	2010	Music Video of the Year	"Lupin"	Nominated	
Melon Music Awards	2012	Top 10 Artists	Kara	Nominated	
Melon Music Awards	2012	Global Star	Kara	Nominated	
Melon Music Awards	2012	Netizen Popularity	"Pandora"	Nominated	
Mnet 20's Choice Awards	2011	Hot Korean Wave Star	Kara	Won	
Mnet Asian Music Awards	2007	Best New Female Group	"Break It"	Nominated	
Mnet Asian Music Awards	2009	Best Female Group	"Honey"	Nominated	
Mnet Asian Music Awards	2009	Best Dance Award	"Honey"	Won	
Mnet Asian Music Awards	2010	Best Female Group	"Lupin"	Nominated	
Mnet Asian Music Awards	2010	The Shilla Duty Free Asian Wave Award	"Lupin"	Nominated	
Mnet Asian Music Awards	2011	Artist of the Year	Kara	Nominated	
Mnet Asian Music Awards	2011	Best Female Group	Kara	Nominated	
Mnet Asian Music Awards	2012	Artist of the Year	Kara	Nominated	
Mnet Asian Music Awards	2012	Best Female Group	Kara	Nominated	
Mnet Asian Music Awards	2012	Best Global Group – Female	Kara	Won	
MTV Video Music Awards Japan	2012	Album of the Year	Super Girl	Nominated	
SBS MTV Best of the Best	2012	Best Rival	Kara	Won	
SBS MTV Best of the Best	2012	Artist of the Year	Kara	Nominated	
SBS MTV Best of the Best	2012	Best Dance Video	Kara	Nominated	
SBS MTV Best of the Best	2014	Best Female Music Video	"Mamma Mia"	Won	
Seoul Music Awards	2010	Daesang Award	Kara	Nominated	
Seoul Music Awards	2010	Bonsang Award	Kara	Won	
Seoul Music Awards	2010	Popularity Award	Kara	Nominated	
Seoul Music Awards	2011	Popularity Award	Kara	Nominated	
Seoul Music Awards	2012	Daesang Award	Kara	Nominated	
Seoul Music Awards	2012	Bonsang Award	Kara	Won	
Seoul Music Awards	2012	Popularity Award	Kara	Nominated	
Seoul Music Awards	2012	Hallyu Special Award	Kara	Won	
Seoul Music Awards	2013	Bonsang Award	Kara	Nominated	
Seoul Music Awards	2013	Popularity Award	Kara	Nominated	
Seoul Music Awards	2014	Bonsang Award	Kara	Nominated	
Seoul Music Awards	2014	Popularity Award	Kara	Nominated	
Seoul Music Awards	2015	Bonsang Award	Kara	Nominated	
Seoul Music Awards	2015	Popularity Award	Kara	Nominated	
Seoul Music Awards	2015	Hallyu Special Award	Kara	Nominated	
Seoul Music Awards	2023	K-pop Special Award	Kara	Won	
Style Icon Awards	2009	Best Female Singer	Kara	Nominated	
Style Icon Awards	2010	Best Female Singer	Kara	Nominated	
Style Icon Awards	2011	Best Female Singer	Kara	Nominated	
World Music Awards	2011	World's Best Group Selling Asian Artist	Kara	Won	
World Music Awards	2011	World's Best Female Group Asian	Kara	Won	
World Music Awards	2014	World's Best Group	Kara	Nominated	
World Music Awards	2014	World's Best Album	Best Girls	Nominated	

== Listicles ==
Name of publisher, year listed, name of listicle, and placement
Publisher	Year	Listicle	Ranking	Ref.
The Dong-a Ilbo	2016	Best Female Artists According to Experts	8th	
Forbes	2012	Korea Power Celebrity 40	4th	
Forbes	2013	Korea Power Celebrity 40	13th	
Forbes	2014	Korea Power Celebrity 40	19th	
