= Korean musicians in Japan =

Japan occupied Korea as a colony from 1910 to 1945. South Korean musicians have been successful in Japan since the inception of Korean popular music. There have been a number of ethnically South Korean singers who have gained fame in Japan. Some of these singers, including Choi Gyuyeop/Hasegawa Ichiro and Yi Nan-yong/Oka Ranko were Zainichi, Koreans with Japanese residency. Among these Zainichi artists, there were and still are some who have made public declarations of their Korean descent, and many more who were rumored to be Korean but have never made formal confirmations. Those who do divulge their heritage often do so after they have attained a relatively stable level of popularity. The act of revealing one's Korean ethnicity is called "coming out". Nevertheless, there were South Korean singers like Cho Yong-pil and Kye Un-seuk, in the 1970s and 1980s who were household names in Japan, despite not being Zainichi. Today, there are also a number of non-Zainichi Korean artists such as BoA, Crystal Kay, TVXQ, BIGBANG, KARA, and BTS who have found chart and album success in Japan.

Many Korean singers who were famous in Japan sang trot music, an older genre of Korean pop music. This is partly because of trot's similarity to enka, a popular Japanese genre that resembles traditional Japanese music. The similarity between Japan's and South Korea's soundscape was due to stricter Japanese political control in the 1930s, when Japan taught Japanese shoka, Japanese-style Western music for children, in Korean elementary schools.

In terms of popular music, or "yuhaengga" in Korean, many early hits were Japanese songs that had been translated into Korean. Nevertheless, many Koreans still contributed their own unique touch to the emerging field of pop music in Korea. For example, Japanese popular-music composer Koga Masao, who had grown up in colonial Korea, incorporated Korean elements like the use of three beats to create the Korean influenced "Koga melody."

== Zainichi Korean singers ==
=== Choi Gyuyeop/Hasegawa Ichiro ===
Known as the first Korean pop singer to advance into the Japanese market, Choi Gyuyeop sang the translated version of "Arirang," a famous Korean folk song, under the Japanese stage name "Hasegawa Ichiro." By 1932, Gyuyeop was a star in Japan, and in 1933, he held a successful Japanese tour. In 1935, he was voted the most popular singer in South Korea.

=== Yi Nan-yong/Oka Ranko ===
Yi Nan-yong began her career as a singer at a movie theater during the first wave of "yuhaengga". She attained fame through various hits including "Mok'po ui nunmul" and duets with "Emperor" Nam In-su. In 1936, she achieved success in Japan under the stage name "Oka Ranko." By the 1940s, she was participating in the Japanese war effort and was a part of the K.P.L Akdan (K.P.K Musical group), which performed for US troops. Yi later trained her children as musicians and formed the Kim Sisters, a Korean born American singing trio who successfully crossed over into the American market in the 1950s and 1960s.

=== Akiko Wada ===
Born as Kim Bok-Ja, Akiko Wada has risen as a popular Japanese singer and television performer. She made her debut as a singer in 1968, and has had a series of hits over the years, including "Doushaburi no Ame de" (In the Pouring Rain), "Furui Nikki" (Old Diary), and "Datte Shoganai Ja Nai" (Nothing You Can Do About It). She has been given the nickname "Akko" and is known for her height, more masculine appearance and unique singing voice.

=== Crystal Kay ===
Born and raised in Yokohama, Japan to an African-American father and Korean mother, Crystal Kay debuted as a singer at the age of 13 in 1999. She has since released 11 albums, and a number of her albums, including Almost Seventeen (2002), was certified platinum by the Recording Industry Association of Japan. As of 2009, she has sold over two million records domestically and has appeared in a number of films.

Crystal Kay has discussed her nationality and race before, commenting "I consider myself a Japanese artist because I was born and raised here, but nationality-wise I look, and am, foreign."

== Non-Zainichi Korean singers ==
=== Cho Yong-pil ===
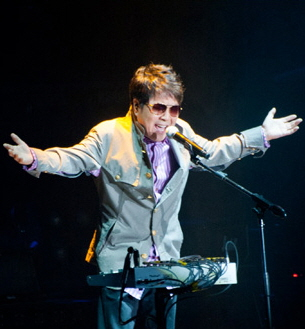
Cho Yong-pil in April 2013. Cho Yong-pil is one of many ethnically Korean artists who have found success in the Japanese music market.

In the 1980s and 1990s, Cho Yong-pil, one of the most famous Korean male singers in Korean pop and trot history, established a strong fan base in Japan. His 1980 trot debut, "Come Back to the Pusan Harbor" performed especially well in Japan. During his Japanese career he received multiple awards and held many concerts in the country. In 1987, 1998 and 1990, he also performed at NHK Kouhaku Uta Gassen, the most prestigious annual music show in Japan.

=== BoA ===
Boa Kwon, commonly known by her stage name BoA (Beat of Angel), is a South Korean singer and actress active in South Korea and Japan. Debuting in 2000 at the age of 14, BoA has released nine Korean and Japanese albums and one English album. BoA was able to break into the Japanese music market with her debut Japanese album, Listen to My Heart, which became an RIAJ-certified million-seller. Listen to My Heart became the first album by a Korean singer to debut at the number-one spot on the Oricon chart. Her second Japanese studio album, Valenti (2003), became her best-selling album, with over 1,249,000 copies sold. Since Valenti, she often changed her image and toured around Japan and she continued to reach chart success in future.

In September 2004, BoA was in controversy in Japan over donating ₩50 million to a memorial project for An Jung-geun, a Korean independence activist and nationalist.

She is the only foreign artist to have three albums sell more than one million copies in Japan and is one of only two artists to have six consecutive number-one studio albums on the Oricon charts since her debut.

=== KARA ===
South Korean girl group KARA debuted in Japan in August 2010 with a Japanese remake of their Korean song "Mister". The single ranked in various music charts and proved to be very popular in Japan. The song eventually became the most downloaded song of all time by a Korean artist in Japan, with downloads exceeding 2 million as of March 2012. The group released their second Japanese single "Jumping" followed by their first compilation album, Kara Best 2007-2010. It was announced on November 3, 2010, that the album was certified gold by the RIAJ, making the group the first ever Korean group since the 1990s to release an all-Korean album that was able break the 100 thousand copies barrier in Japan. It was eventually certified platinum with shipments exceeding 250,000 copies. Their debut Japanese album, Girl's Talk, was released on November 24, 2010. It sold 107,000 copies in its first week and ranked number 2 in the Oricon Weekly Album Chart, making this the first album by a non-Japanese girl group in Japan in 6 years and 9 months to sell more than 100,000 albums in its first week. The album was certified double platinum by the RIAJ on November 18, 2011, with sales exceeding half a million in Japan. The group's Korean single "Lupin" was also certified Gold by the RIAJ for sales of over 100,000, despite being a Korean-language song and not officially being released in Japan. Their first year in Japan earned them many accolades; the group was chosen as the Best Rookie Artist according to a popular Japanese mobile ringtone site, Recochoku and Oricon also announced the group as 2010's Best Rookie Artist, generating revenue to some 1.3 billion yen (or US$15.4 million); and with a total of 493,000 copies of their releases sold this year.

The group's popularity continued into 2011 with the release of their first DVD Kara Best Clips, which is a compilation of their past music videos. After one week, the group was able to set a record when they ranked number one in the Oricon's Weekly Composite DVD Chart for two weeks. This made them the first ever foreign artist to be number one for two consecutive weeks since the charts implementation in 1999. The group then released three Japanese singles that year, "Jet Coaster Love", "Go Go Summer!" and "Winter Magic", with the former two selling over 100,000 copies in their first week of release. "Go Go Summer!" topped the RIAJ Digital Track Chart for 3 weeks, making KARA the only Korean artist to top the chart for more than one week. KARA released their second Japanese album, Super Girl, on November 21, 2011. The album received over 360,000 pre-orders alone and it went on to debut at number one on Oricon's Weekly Album Chart. With it, the group broke the record set by The Nolans, becoming the first foreign female group in thirty years to top both the singles and albums rankings. The album became the fastest selling album in Japan by a Korean group ever, maintaining the record for over 6 years. They finished the year with a performance at the prestigious 62nd Kōhaku Uta Gassen.

The group received the "Best Hallyu Star Award" at the 2012 Golden Disk Awards and Seoul Music Awards for their success in promoting K-pop in Japan. Kara's success continued into 2012 with the release of "Speed Up / Girl's Power". Following the release of the single, it was reported that the group had sold more than one million physical copies of their singles in Japan, making them the third South Korean artist to do so after BoA and TVXQ. KARA held a concert at Tokyo Dome on January 6, 2013. This made the group the first female South Korean act to hold a concert at this particular venue. KARA continued to release music and tour in Japan in 2013, but their popularity began to decline in 2014 following the departure of members Jiyoung and Nicole. The group's final performance in Japan was held on September 29, 2015, as part of their 3rd Japanese tour, before ultimately disbanding at the beginning of 2016.
