= Kara Best Clips =

2011 music video compilation by Kara

Video by Kara
- Released: February 23, 2011
- Recorded: 2007–2011
- Genre: K-pop, J-pop, dance-pop
- Label: Universal Sigma

Kara chronology
| Karadise 2011 Season's Greeting From Thai (2010) | Kara Best Clips (2011) | Kara's All About Beauty (2011) |

Kara Best Clips is the first music video compilation and fourth DVD by the South Korean girl group Kara. It was released on February 23, 2011 in two editions: Regular and Limited. It ranked #1 in Oricon Weekly DVD Chart for two consecutive weeks with 132,132 copies sold in first week.

A Blu-ray edition of the DVD was released on February 29, 2012.

== Track listing ==
| No. | Title | Length |
|---|---|---|
| 1. | "Rock U" |
| 2. | "Pretty Girl" |
| 3. | "Honey" (하니) |
| 4. | "Wanna" |
| 5. | "Lupin" (루팡) |
| 6. | "Jumping" (ジャンピン) (Japanese version) |
| 7. | "Mister" (ミスター) |
| 8. | "Jumping" (점핑) (Korean version) |
| 9. | "Umbrella" (SBS Inkigayo 2010.2.28) |
| 10. | "Burn" (SBS Inkigayo 2010.11.21) |
| 11. | "Lupin (dust ver.)" (SBS Gayo Daejun 2010.12.29) |
| 12. | "KARA no Real Girls Talk" (Limited Edition Only) |

== Chart performance ==
It debuted #1 in the Oricon daily chart and eventually became #1 in the Oricon weekly chart making the group the first foreign "female" artist to top the composite DVD ranking chart since its inception in 1999. The previous record was held by Chinese group Twelve Girls Band's, "Twelve Girls Band: First Premium Concert in Japan" (January 26, 2004) and American artist Britney Spears's Greatest Hits: My Prerogative (December 20, 2004) have come in at #2 on Oricon's Weekly Composite DVD Ranking. Furthermore, Kara sold 132,000 copies of their music video collection "Kara Best Clips" in their first week and this is the greatest amount sold for a "music video collection" for a female artist; not including live performance DVDs. The previous top seller was Mai Kuraki's "First Cut" (November 20, 2000), which sold 99,000 copies. Kuraki has held the record for 10 years and 3 months, but Kara has just taken her record away. In total, there have been only 6 foreign artists who have made it to number one on the Weekly DVD Composite Ranking: Kara, The Beatles, Led Zeppelin, Tohoshinki (TVXQ), Junsu/Jejung/Yuchun (JYJ) and Michael Jackson.

=== Charts ===
| Chart | Peak position |
|---|---|
| Oricon Weekly DVD chart | 1 |
| Oricon Yearly DVD chart | 4 |

=== Sales and certifications ===
| Chart | Amount |
|---|---|
| Oricon physical sales | 289,376+ |
| RIAJ physical shipping certification | Platinum (250,000+) |

== Kara Best Clips II & Shows ==
Kara Best Clips II & Shows

Video by Kara
- Released: February 29, 2012
- Recorded: 2007–2011
- Genre: K-pop, J-pop, dance-pop
- Label: Universal Sigma

Kara chronology
| Step It Up (2012) | Kara Best Clips II & Shows (2012) | Kara 1st Japan Tour Karasia (2012) |

Kara Best Clips II & Shows is a second part of the music video compilation "Kara Best Clips" and also first live DVD of the group. It was released on February 29, 2012 in 2 formats: DVD and Blu-ray and 2 different editions: Limited (with 3 discs) and Regular edition (with 2 discs). Disc 2 includes the show "Now, the Word You Want to Give... KARA JAPAN COME BACK 2011", held in Yokohama, Japan. It was the first showcase of the group in Japan.

=== Track listing ===
Disc 1: Music videos
| No. | Title | Length |
|---|---|---|
| 1. | "Jet Coaster Love" (ジェットコースターラブ) |
| 2. | "Go Go Summer!" (GO GO サマー!) |
| 3. | "Winter Magic" (ウィンターマジック) |
| 4. | "Ima, Okuritai 'Arigatō'" (今、贈りたい「ありがとう」) |
| 5. | "Mister" (ミスター) |
| 6. | "Jumping" (ジャンピン) (Japanese version) |
| 7. | "Step" |
| 8. | "Go Go Summer!" (Live Performance (CJ Media Japan (Mnet) 「JJ's M Studio」)) (Bonus video) |

Disc 2: Live at Yokohama Arena
| No. | Title | Length |
|---|---|---|
| 1. | "Opening" |
| 2. | "Jumpin'" (ジャンピン) |
| 3. | "Lupin" |
| 4. | "Wanna" |
| 5. | "Go Go Summer!" |
| 6. | "SOS" |
| 7. | "MC" |
| 8. | "Ima, Okuritai 'Arigatō'" |
| 9. | "Jet Coaster Love" |
| 10. | "Mister" (ミスター) |
| 11. | "Girls Be Ambitious!" (ガールズ ビー アンビシャス!) |
| 12. | "Pretty Girl" |

Disc 3: Live at Yokohama Arena – Behind the Scenes & Rehearsals (Limited Edition only)
| No. | Title | Length |
|---|---|---|
| 1. | ""Now, the Word You Want to Give... Kara Japan Come Back 2011" Making of & Rehearsals – Day 1" (「今、贈りたい言葉... Kara Japan Come Back 2011」 当日リハーサル&メイキング) |
| 2. | ""Now, the Word You Want to Give... Kara Japan Come Back 2011" Making of & Rehearsals – Day 5" (「今、贈りたい言葉... Kara Japan Come Back 2011」 当日リハーサル&メイキング) |

=== Charts ===
| Chart | Peak position |
|---|---|
| Oricon Weekly DVD chart | 1 |
| Oricon Weekly Blu-ray chart | 1 |
| Oricon Yearly DVD chart | 11 |
| Oricon Yearly Blu-ray chart | 11 |

=== Sales and certifications ===
| Chart | Amount |
|---|---|
| Oricon physical sales | 137,890+ |
| RIAJ physical shipping certification | Gold (100,000+) |

== Release history ==
| Country | Edition | Date | Format | Label |
|---|---|---|---|---|
| Japan | Best Clips | February 23, 2011 | DVD | Universal Sigma |
| Japan | Best Clips | February 29, 2012 | Blu-ray Disc | Universal Sigma |
| Japan | Best Clips II & Shows | February 29, 2012 | DVD, Blu-ray disc | Universal Sigma |
