= Kara Special Premium Box for Japan =

Box set by Kara
- Released: April 28, 2010
- Recorded: 2007–2009
- Genre: K-pop, dance-pop
- Language: Korean
- Label: Universal Sigma

Kara chronology
Lupin (2010)	Kara Special Premium Box for Japan (2010)	KARA Best 2007–2010 (2010)

Kara Special Premium Box for Japan is the first box set by South Korean pop girl group Kara. It was released on April 28, 2010 in Japan and contain all albums from 2007 to 2009.

== Album listing ==
- CD1 : The First Blooming
- CD2 : Rock U
- CD3 : Pretty Girl
- CD4 : Honey
- CD5 : Revolution
- CD6 :
1. "Pretty Girl" (JPN Ver.)
2. "Honey" (JPN Ver.)
3. "Wanna" (JPN Ver.)
- DVD : KARA in Okinawa

== Chart performance ==
=== Oricon Chart ===
Oricon Chart	Peak	Debut Sales	Sales Total	Chart Run
Daily Albums Chart	7	1,974	4,332	4 weeks
Weekly Albums Chart	29	3,387	4,332	4 weeks
