= Kara Best 2007–2010 =

Compilation album by Kara
- Released: September 29, 2010
- Recorded: 2007–2010
- Genre: K-pop, dance-pop
- Length: 39:34
- Language: Korean
- Label: Universal Sigma

Kara chronology
Kara Special Premium Box for Japan (2010)	Kara Best 2007–2010 (2010)	Jumping (2010)

Kara Best 2007-2010 is the first Japanese greatest hits album by the South Korean girl group Kara. It was released on September 29, 2010 in Japan in 2 editions: CD+DVD and CD only.

== Background ==
The album contains all singles from 2007 to 2010 and some songs from their albums Rock U, Pretty Girl, Revolution and Lupin. On October 1, 2010, it was announced on their official Japanese website that the album will include a bonus. The group gave photographs to the applicants to show their gratitude. Among those applicants, 10 were chosen via lottery to attend a meet & greet session on October 15, 2010.

== Chart performance ==
The album debuted at number two on the Oricon Daily Chart selling 18,223 copies. This marked the best achievement by a South Korean girl group for a full album in Japan at that time. On October 5, 2010, the album ranked number-two on the Oricon Weekly Chart selling over 51,000 copies, making it the first South Korean girl group album to enter Top 10 on Oricon.

The album was certified Gold by RIAJ, making it the first all-Korean album from a South Korean group since the 90s to break the 100,000 copies barrier in Japan. The album was also the most downloaded album in Japan's iTunes Store Pop. The album exceeded the ranking of Iconiq's Change Myself, Justin Bieber's My World, and Kesha's Animal to become the highest ranked album among newcomers in 2010.

== Track listing ==
Official tracklist
No.	Title	Lyrics	From the album	Length
1.	"Mister" (미스터; Miseuteo)	Soo Yoon Song, Seung Soo Kim & Jae Ho Han	Revolution	3:12
2.	"Lupin" (루팡; Lupang)	Soo Yoon Song, Jae Ho Han & Seung Soo Kim	Lupin	3:11
3.	"Honey" (하니; Hani)	Soo Yoon Song, Seung Soo Kim & Jae Ho Han	Pretty Girl (Honey Special Edition)	3:13
4.	"Pretty Girl"	Soo Yoon Song, Jae Ho Han & Seung Soo Kim	Pretty Girl	3:27
5.	"Wanna"	Soo Yoon Song, Jae Ho Han & Seung Soo Kim	Revolution	3:06
6.	"Rock U"	Soo Yoon Song, Jae Ho Han & Seung Soo Kim	Rock U	3:31
7.	"Umbrella"	Soo Yoon Song, Seung Soo Kim & Jae Ho Han	Lupin	3:25
8.	"I Am... (Ing)" (나는..; Naneun..)	Lee Ju Hyeong & Kim Bo A	Pretty Girl	3:45
9.	"Tasty Love"	Soo Yoon Song, Seung Soo Kim & Jae Ho Han	Lupin	3:05
10.	"Aha"	Han Sang Won	Revolution	3:13
11.	"Break It"	Lee Dong Soo	The First Blooming	3:16
12.	"Good Day"	Seung Soo Kim & Jae Ho Han	Rock U	3:14
Total length:				39:34

DVD
No.	Title	Length
1.	"Kara In Japan Documentary"

== Charts ==
=== Weekly charts ===
Chart (2010)	Peak position
Japanese Albums (Oricon)	2

=== Monthly charts ===
Chart (2010)	Peak position
Japanese Albums (Oricon)	7

=== Year-end charts ===
Chart (2010)	Position
Japanese Albums (Oricon)	70
Chart (2011)	Position
Japanese Albums (Oricon)	71

== Certifications ==
Region	Certification	Certified units/sales
Japan (RIAJ)	Platinum	250,000^{^}
^{^} Shipments figures based on certification alone.
