= In Love (EP) =

- From clock-wise left to right: Seung-yeon (bottom), Gyu-ri (top), Ha-ra and Young-ji

EP by Kara
- Released: May 26, 2015
- Recorded: 2015
- Studio: DSP Studios
- Genre: Dance-pop
- Length: 19:59
- Language: Korean
- Label: DSP; Loen

Kara chronology
Day & Night (2014)	In Love (2015)	Girl's Story (2015)

Singles from In Love
- 1. "Cupid" Released: May 26, 2015

In Love is the seventh extended play released by the South Korean girl group Kara, on May 26, 2015 with the lead single "Cupid".

This marks their final release under DSP prior the expired contract in early 2016 and last Korean release featuring member Hara before her death in 2019.

== Background ==
On April 14, 2015, DSP Media confirmed that the group will be releasing their seventh mini album in May. The girls were reportedly working with a new team to show their transformation while pouring their heart and soul into the album production. During the album showcase, the members stated that their goal with the album was to show the evolution of the definition of being "KARA-style" while maintaining the "healthy, energetic image" that their fans originally admired about them. Member Seungyeon stated that while maintaining this style, they wanted to start a new golden era.

== Composition ==
The mini album contains six tracks. The promotional track, "Cupid", was described as a rhythmical track with shuffle elements and is a fun, flirtatious song about a girl wanting to capture the heart of her love interest. It was produced by e.one, who previously worked with Rain, EXO, Shinhwa and A Pink.

== Promotions ==
The group revealed the title track for the album, "Cupid", at the 2015 Dream Concert on May 23 before the official release of the album and song. After which, the group held an album showcase on May 26, which is the same day as the EP's release, at the Blue Square Samsung Card Hall at 8PM KST. It was broadcast live on 1theK's YouTube channel, and they also had an exclusive interview before the live event. They began their promotion cycle in music programs starting from MBC's Show Champion by performing "Starlight" and the promotional single "Cupid" on May 28. The following week, they took first place and won a trophy on their comeback stage at MTV Korea's The Show on June 2. The group wrap up the promotion cycle for the album on June 21, 2015.

In Love showcase set list
1. Cupid (큐피드)
2. In Those Days (그땐 그냥)
3. Mamma Mia (맘마 미아)
4. Talk
5. Starlight
6. Step
7. Go Go Summer! (Korean version)
8. Cupid (encore)

== Track listing ==
The track listing for 'In Love' was revealed on May 22 at 12AM KST on Kara's official Twitter. A video of the album preview was uploaded on Kara's official YouTube channel as well.

Official track listing
No.	Title	Lyrics	Music	Arrangement	Length
1.	"Starlight"	Lee Ju-hyung; Chu Dae-kwan	Lee Ju-hyung; Chu Dae-kwan	Lee Ju-hyung; Chu Dae-kwan	3:29
2.	"Cupid" (큐피드)	Nassun; e.one (Note: e.one is a music production team composed of Choi Hyun-joon (member of V.O.S) and Jung Ho-hyun.); EJ SHOW	e.one; EJ SHOW	e. one; EJ SHOW	3:25
3.	"In Those Days" (그땐그냥)	어벤전승	어벤전승	어벤정승	3:19
4.	"I Luv Me"	Kang Jun-myung; Nam Gi-sang	Kwon Sun-ig; Kim Jae-woong; Nam Gi-sang; Jung Taek-jun	Kim Jae-woong; Jung Taek-jun	3:08
5.	"Peek-A-Boo" (Gyu-ri and Young-ji)	Yoon Young-min	Park Soo-suk; Yoon Young-min	Park Soo-suk; Yoon Young-min	3:18
6.	"Dreamlover" (Gyu-ri and Seung-yeon)	Dittomood	Lee Jun-yeop; MachWave	Lee Jun-yeop; MachWave	3:29
Total length:					19:59

== Commercial performance ==
On its first week of release, the album reached number two on Gaon Chart's National Physical Albums ranking. The promotional single, Cupid, also earned 69,802 of online downloads and also ranked number one in the Gaon Social Chart with 73,242 points.

== Chart performance ==
Chart	Peak position
South Korea Gaon weekly album chart	2

=== Sales and certifications ===
Chart	Amount
Gaon physical sales	8,220+
Oricon physical sales	3,022+

== Release history ==
Country	Date	Format	Label
South Korea	May 26, 2015	CD, Digital download	DSP Media; LOEN Entertainment
Worldwide	May 26, 2015	Digital download	DSP Media; LOEN Entertainment
