= Day & Night (Kara EP) =

- From left to right : Young-ji, Gyu-ri, Seung-yeon and Hara.

EP by Kara
- Released: August 18, 2014
- Recorded: 2014
- Genre: Dance-pop; R&B
- Language: Korean
- Label: DSP
- Producer: Duble Sidekick

Kara chronology
Best Girls (2013)	Day & Night (2014)	In Love (2015)

Singles from Day & Night
- 1. "Mamma Mia" Released: August 18, 2014

Day & Night is the sixth extended play by South Korean girl group Kara, released on August 18, 2014, with the lead single "Mamma Mia". It marks their first released with new member Heo Youngji after the departure of members Nicole and Jiyoung earlier in the year.

== Background ==
After the departure of Nicole Jung and Kang Jiyoung from the group, DSP Media started a TV show titled Kara Project, a reality TV program which revolves around seven trainees who competed to become the new member of the group. On July 1, 2014, Heo Youngji was proclaimed the winner. Following her victory, DSP announced plans for the group to release a South Korean album in August before embarking on a concert tour in Japan on October. Producer Duble Sidekick was later announced to be working on the record.

On July 16, it was reported that the group finished the recordings of the mini-album's promotional single music video. On August 1, it was revealed that its title track will also be released as single in Japan after it received good reviews from Japanese affiliates. The full track listing of the single was unveiled on August 8, with "So Good" serving as its B-side.

== Composition ==
The EP consists of six tracks. The first five tracks, including the lead single "Mamma Mia", were composed by Duble Sidekick. The music video was filmed in the Gyonggi Province on July 9. The song will also be released as the group's eleventh Japanese single after it received good reviews from Japanese affiliate label, Universal Sigma. The last track on the album, titled "Story", were co-written by members Park Gyuri, Han Seung Yeon, and Goo Hara.

== Promotion ==
The group held an album showcase on August 18, same day as the EP's release, at UNIQLO-AX Hall and was also aired on channels SBS MTV in South Korea and TBS in Japan on August 24.

Day & Night showcase setlist
1. Go Go Summer! (Korean version)
2. So Good
3. Talk
4. 2Night
5. Step
6. Lupin
7. Talk
8. Mamma Mia

== Track listing ==
The track listing was revealed on August 8. A video of the album preview was uploaded on Kara's official YouTube channel.

Official tracklist
No.	Title	Lyrics	Music	Length
1.	"Live"	Duble Sidekick; David Kim	Duble Sidekick; Shion	3:29
2.	"Mamma Mia" (맘마미아)	Duble Sidekick	Duble Sidekick; Homeboy; Tenzo & Tazco	3:32
3.	"So Good"	Duble Sidekick; David Kim	Duble Sidekick; Tenzo & Tazco	3:07
4.	"Melancholy (24/7)" (멜랑꼴리; Mellangkkolli)	Duble Sidekick; David Kim	Duble Sidekick; Seion	3:37
5.	"Red Light" (빨간불; Ppalganbul)	Duble Sidekick; David Kim	Duble Sidekick; Tenzo & Tazco	3:25
6.	"Story" (이야기; Iyagi)	G. R. Park; S. Y. Han; H. R. Goo	Shion	4:03
Total length:				20:33

== Release history ==
Country	Date	Format	Label
South Korea	August 18, 2014	CD, Digital download	DSP Media; LOEN Entertainment
Worldwide	August 18, 2014	Digital download	DSP Media; LOEN Entertainment
Japan	November 5, 2014	CD, Digital download	Universal Sigma

== Singles ==
"Mamma Mia!"
- Clockwise from top left : Park Gyuri, Han Seungyeon, Heo Youngji and Goo Hara.

Single by Kara

from the album Day & Night and Girl's Story
- B-side: "So Good"; "Don't Hurry"
- Released: August 27, 2014
- Genre: Dance-pop
- Length: 3:32
- Label: Universal Sigma
- Songwriter(s): Duble Sidekick, David Kim
- Producer(s): Duble Sidekick; Shion

Kara Japanese singles chronology
"French Kiss" (2013)	"Mamma Mia!" (2014)	"Summer Gic / Sunshine Miracle / Sunny Days" (2015)

"Mamma Mia!" (マンマミーア！) is the eleventh Japanese single by South Korean girl group Kara and is also taken from their sixth Korean mini-album Day & Night which was released on August 18, 2014. It was released as a single in Japan on August 27 in three editions. This marks the second time that the group has released and promoted a song simultaneously in both South Korea and Japan after "Jumping".

After the departure of Nicole Jung and Kang Jiyoung from the group, DSP Media started a reality TV program titled Kara Project, which revolves around seven trainees who compete to become the new member of the group. On July 1, 2014, Heo Youngji was proclaimed the winner. Following her victory, DSP announced plans for the group to release a South Korean album in August before embarking on a concert tour in Japan on October. Producer Duble Sidekick was later announced to be working on the group's next album. On August 1, it was revealed that its title track will also be released as single in Japan after it received good reviews from Japanese affiliates. The full track listing of the single was unveiled on August 8, with "So Good" serving as its B-side.

The single cover for the three editions of the single were first released on July 31, 2014.

It was produced by Duble Sidekick and was described as a powerful dance song that "accentuates Kara's unique color". The music video was filmed in the Gyeonggi Province on July 9.

== Track listing ==
All editions tracklist
No.	Title	Lyrics	Music	Length
1.	"Mamma Mia!" (マンマミーア！)	Duble Sidekick	Duble Sidekick; Homeboy; Tenzo & Tazco	3:32
2.	"So Good" (ソー・グッド)	Duble Sidekick; David Kim	Duble Sidekick; Tenzo & Tazco	3:07
3.	"Mamma Mia!" (Instrumental)			3:32
4.	"So Good" (Instrumental)			3:07

Bonus Track (Limited edition version C)
No.	Title	Length
5.	"Don't Hurry"

DVD (Version A)
No.	Title	Length
1.	"Mamma Mia!" (Music video – Japanese version)
2.	"Mamma Mia!" (Music video – Dance version)
3.	"Mamma Mia!" (Music video – Behind the Scenes)

== Chart performance ==
=== Oricon chart ===
Oricon Chart	Peak	Debut sales	Sales total
Daily Singles Chart	5	25,702 (weekly)	31,864+
Weekly Singles Chart	6	25,702 (weekly)	31,864+
