= We're with You =

"We're With You"

Song by Kara
- Released: May 3, 2010 (Korea); April 4, 2012 (Japan)
- Recorded: 2010
- Genre: K-pop, dance-pop
- Length: 3:21
- Label: DSP Entertainment, Mnet Media
- Songwriter(s): Han Jae-Ho, Kim Seung Soo

Music video
- "We're with You" on YouTube

"We're With You" is a Korean language song, and the third digital single by South Korean girl group Kara. It was part of SBS's 2010 FIFA World Cup campaign to cheer for the South Korean team in South Africa. The song was released on May 3, 2010. The first physical release of the song was on the Tour edition of the group's second Japanese album "Super Girl", released on April 11, 2012.

== History ==
On April 16, 2010, it was revealed that Kara would release a cheer song for the 2010 FiFA World Cup composed by Han JaeHo and Kim SeungSoo, who also produced "Mister" and "Lupin". Behind-the-scenes and individual member teaser videos revealed the following week along with photos of Kara wearing cheerleader outfits. The song and full music video were released on May 3, 2010.

However, because it was part of SBS's project and is used as the background music for the campaign, the music video was announced to be banned from being broadcast on two other major channels MBC and KBS on May 20, 2010.

== Lyrics ==
The lyrics commence "We believe in you..":

"우린 너를 믿어 늘 앞만 보고 높은 꿈을 향해 달려 가는 거야 함께라서 좋아 우리는 너라서 참 다행이야 "
"Ulin neoleul mid-eo neul apman bogo nop-eun kkum-eul hyanghae dallyeo ganeun geoya hamkkelaseo joh-a ulineun neolaseo cham dahaeng-iya"

== Track list ==
South Korea digital single
No.	Title	Length
1.	"We're With You"	3:21
2.	"We're With You" (Remix)	3:28
3.	"We're With You" (Instrumental)	3:21
4.	"We're With You" (Remix) (Instrumental)	3:28
Total length:		13:34

Japan digital single
No.	Title	Length
1.	"We're With You"	3:23

== Chart performance ==
Chart (2010 - 2012)	Peak position
South Korea Gaon Weekly chart	14
South Korea Gaon Monthly chart	47
Japan RIAJ Digital Track Chart weekly top 100	24
