= Step (Kara album) =

Studio album by Kara
- Released: September 6, 2011
- Recorded: 2011
- Studio: DSP Studios
- Genre: Pop; dance-pop; EDM
- Length: 32:01
- Language: Korean
- Label: DSP

Kara chronology
Girl's Talk (2010)	Step (2011)	Super Girl (2011)

Singles from Step
- 1. "Step" Released: September 6, 2011

Step is the fourth studio album and third Korean release by South Korean girl group Kara, released on September 6, 2011. A special limited edition was available for pre-order starting August 25, 2011. By the end of 2011, Step sold 100,662 copies in South Korea. The album was shortlisted in Asia Association Music Prize.

== Background and recording ==
On August 4, 2011, the group confirmed that they would be releasing their third official album in mid-September and would resume their activities in South Korea for the first time in over six months. It was also reported by industry representatives that the group had been recording songs for the album during their spare time while they were busy promoting their fourth Japanese single, "Go Go Summer!". DSP Media stated that the group were in the process of reviewing which songs to be used as the lead songs from the album.

== Concept and artwork ==
Regarding the concept of the album, the group was also faced with a choice between maintaining their usual bright, cute, and youthful concept or transforming into something new, in which they ultimately chose the latter.

== Composition ==
The limited edition of the album contains a bonus track called "With My Heart (Dear Kamilia)", which is the Korean version of "Ima, Okuritai 「Arigatou」" from their third Japanese single. The album's title track was released as the lead single.

== Release and promotion ==
A special edition of the album was available for pre-order on August 25, 2011, 10 days ahead of the official release. The special edition includes a 32-page booklet, a digipack, and a bonus track. According to DSP Media, the first 100 people to purchase the album would be chosen to attend a special showcase by KARA on September 14, 2011. DSP Media also teamed up with YouTube to deliver a special online series of three episodes titled "KARA Channel", which covered the group's preparations for the release of the album. The series began airing on Kara's official YouTube channel on September 7, 2011, and ended on September 21, 2011. Due to the group's commitments with their schedule in Japan, they only promoted the album for three weeks.

== Track listing ==
No.	Title	Lyrics	Music	Arrangements	Length
1.	"EY! OH!" (Intro)	Park Se Hyun, Yoo Hyun-Sang, Jang Jae Min	Park Se Hyun, Yoo Hyun-Sang, Jang Jae Min	Park Se Hyun, Yoo Hyun-Sang, Jang Jae Min	1:01
2.	"Step"	Song Soo Yoon	Han Jae Ho, Kim Seung Soo	Han Jae Ho, Kim Seung Soo, Hong Seunghyun	3:21
3.	"Rider"	Yoo Hyun-Sang, Jang Jae Min	Yoo Hyun-Sang, Jang Jae Min	Yoo Hyun-Sang, Jang Jae Min	3:03
4.	"Strawberry"	Zig Zag Note	Zig Zag Note	Zig Zag Note	3:31
5.	"Follow Me" (따라와; Ddarawa)	Zig Zag Note	Zig Zag Note	Zig Zag Note	3:29
6.	"Date (My Boy)"	Kim Won Hyun, Jang Sang Huk	Kim Won Hyun	Kim Won Hyun	3:22
7.	"I Am... (Ing)" (나는..; Naneun..) (Acoustic Version)	Kim Bo-Ah, Lee Joohyung	Kim Bo-Ah, Lee Joohyung	Lee Joohyung	3:58
8.	"Kara 4 U" (Outro)	Park Se Hyun, Yoo Hyun-Sang, Jang Jae Min	Park Se Hyun, Yoo Hyun-Sang, Jang Jae Min	Park Se Hyun, Yoo Hyun-Sang, Jang Jae Min	1:03
9.	"Step" (Instrumental)		Han Jae Ho, Kim Seung Soo	Han Jae Ho, Kim Seung Soo, Hong Seunghyun	3:21
10.	"With My Heart (Dear Kamilia)" (Bonus Track)	Park Hae In	Simon Isogai	Simon Isogai	5:49
Total length:					32:01

DVD (Taiwan CD+DVD version)
No.	Title	Length
1.	"Step" (Music Video)
2.	"Step" (Teaser 1)
3.	"Step" (Teaser 2)

Notes

- "I Am... (Ing) (Acoustic Version)" is a re-recorded version of a song that was previously included in the group's second mini-album "Pretty Girl".
- "With My Heart (Dear Kamilia)" is a Korean version of "Ima, Okuritai 「Arigatou」", from their Japanese single "Jet Coaster Love".

== Charts ==
=== Weekly charts ===
Chart (2011)	Peak position
South Korean Albums (Gaon)	1
Japanese Albums (Oricon)	5
Taiwan J-pop Albums (G-Music)	7

=== Yearly charts ===
Chart (2011)	Position
South Korean Albums (Gaon)	11

== Release history ==
Country	Date	Format	Label
Japan	October 5, 2011	CD	Universal Music Japan
Taiwan	October 7, 2011	CD & DVD	Warner Music Taiwan
