= Urakara =

- Written by: Hiroki Murakami
- Directed by: Keisuke Niki
- Starring: Kara
- Opening theme: "SOS" by Kara
- Ending theme: "Ima, Okuritai Arigatō (今、贈りたい『ありがとう』)" by Kara
- Country of origin: Japan
- Original language: Japanese
- No. of episodes: 12 (DVD: 10)

Production
- Running time: Friday 24:12-24:53
- Production companies: TVMAN UNION; TV Tokyo

Original release
- Network: TV Tokyo tvN
- Release: 14 January – 8 April 2011

Urakara, often stylized as URAKARA, is a Japanese television drama series from TV Tokyo, first shown in Japan from 14 January 2011.

== History ==
The drama revolves around five characters played by the members of popular South Korean girl group Kara. The members of Kara act as five girls (each with the same name as their real-life selves) who are given missions related to love. The drama is the Japanese acting debut for Kara, although they have previously made cameo appearances as a group in a couple of Korean dramas. Leader Park Gyuri and member Han Seung-yeon had child actress roles in several Korean television series prior to their singing debuts. "Urakara" has also been produced as part of Kara's popularity in Japan since their Japanese debut single "Mister" in 2010.

== Cast ==
- Park Gyu-ri as Gyuri
- Han Seung-yeon as Seungyeon
- Nicole Jung as Nicole
- Goo Hara as Hara
- Kang Ji-young as Jiyoung
- Mari Hamada as Nozomi Kansai
- Shunsuke Nakamura (ep.1)
- Ken Maeda (ep.10)
- Taiyo Ayukawa (ep.10)
