= Jumping (EP) =

EP by Kara
- Released: November 10, 2010
- Recorded: 2010
- Genre: Dance-pop
- Length: 18:12
- Language: Korean
- Label: DSP
- Producer: Han Jae-ho; Kim Seung-soo; Hwang hyun

Kara chronology
| Kara Best 2007–2010 (2010) | Jumping (2010) | Girl's Talk (2010) |

Singles from Jumping
- 1. "Jumping" Released: November 10, 2010

Jumping (Korean: 점핑) is the fourth extended play (EP) by South Korean girl group Kara, released on November 10, 2010, by DSP. It consists of five tracks including the lead single "Jumping", which is also a Korean version of the group's second Japanese single.

== History ==
A teaser photo of Jumping's album cover was released on November 3, 2010, and according to a company official, "Kara's new album utilizes the optical art concept of black and white geometric patterns, which differs depending on each member's physical characteristics and image." He added, "You will see a new and upgraded Kara with these modern, yet chic images."

Following the release of the group's second Japanese single, DSP Entertainment announced that Kara will also be making a comeback again in South Korea during the same month of the Japanese single's release with a brand-new mini album to be released by November 10, 2010. The album's lead single will be the Korean version of their second Japanese single, "Jumping", allowing the group to promote the same song in both South Korea and Japan at the same time. Despite being promoted at the same time, Kara would be showing 2 different concepts for the song in Korea and Japan.

== Promotion ==
Kara began their Korean promotions on mid-November, starting on MBC's Music Core on November 21, 2010. The choreography for Jumping was slightly altered to differ from their Japanese promotions. The group also performed 'Burn' as a part of their special comeback performance.

On December 10, the group eventually got their second #1 win on KBS Music Bank for Jumping. Two days after their win in Music Bank, Kara won a #1 Mutizen Award for "Jumping" on SBS Inkigayo's 600th episode.

== Track listing ==
All lyrics are written by Song Soo-Yun

| No. | Title | Music | Length |
|---|---|---|---|
| 1. | "Love Is" | Han Jae-Ho, Kim Seung-Soo | 3:25 |
| 2. | "Jumping" (점핑) | Han Jae-Ho, Kim Seung-Soo | 2:58 |
| 3. | "Burn" | Han Jae-Ho, Kim Seung-Soo | 3:30 |
| 4. | "Binks" | Han Jae-Ho, Kim Seung-Soo | 3:13 |
| 5. | "With" | Hwang-Hyun | 3:28 |
| 6. | "Jumping (Instrumental)" | Han Jae-Ho, Kim Seung-Soo | 2:58 |
| Total length: | | | 18:12 |

== Charts ==
=== Album chart ===
| Chart | Peak position |
|---|---|
| South Korea Gaon Weekly albums chart | 1 |
| South Korea Gaon Monthly albums chart | 4 |
| South Korea Gaon Yearly albums chart | 37 |
| Japan Oricon Weekly Chart | 52 |

=== Single chart ===
| Song | Peak chart position |
| Song | Gaon Chart |
|---|---|
| "Jumping" | 3 |

==== Other songs charted ====
| Song | Peak chart position |
| Song | Gaon Chart |
|---|---|
| "Love Is" | 77 |
| "Burn" | 98 |
| "Binks" | 102 |
| "With" | 104 |

=== Sales and certifications ===
| Chart | Amount |
|---|---|
| Gaon physical sales | 78,557 |
| Oricon physical sales | 12,885 |

== Release history ==
| Country | Date | Format | Label | Distribution |
|---|---|---|---|---|
| South Korea | November 10, 2010 | Digital download | DSP | Mnet |
| South Korea | November 17, 2010 | CD | DSP | Mnet |
| Japan | February 23, 2011 | Digital download, CD | DSP | Universal Sigma |
