= Girl's Talk =

- Version C cover

Studio album by Kara
- Released: November 24, 2010
- Recorded: 2010
- Genre: J-pop; dance-pop
- Length: 35:26 (Standard); 45:46 (Limited Editions C)
- Language: Japanese
- Label: Universal Sigma

Kara chronology
Jumping (2010)	Girl's Talk (2010)	Step (2011)

Singles from Girl's Talk
- 1. "Mister" Released: August 11, 2010; 2. "Jumping" Released: November 10, 2010

Girl's Talk (ガールズトーク, Gāruzu Tōku) is the first Japanese studio album by South Korean girl group Kara. It was released on November 24, 2010, in four editions: CD+DVD, CD+Photobook (28-pages), CD-Only First Press coming with Korean versions of the songs "Sweet Days", "Love Is", and "Binks" and a CD-Only Normal Press coming with no bonus tracks. The album peaked at number two on the Oricon Weekly Album Charts and was certified as double platinum by the RIAJ.

== Composition ==
The album contains two original Japanese songs. There are five songs that were included on the group's fourth Korean mini-album Jumping (2010) including "Sweet Days" which was titled "With" on the mini-album and the second single Jumping. There are two songs which was previously released in Korean on their third mini-album Lupin (2010) and these are "Lupin" and "Umbrella". Their Japanese single debut, "Mister", was previously released in Korean on their second studio album Revolution (2009).

== Chart performance ==
Girl's Talk had sold over 107,000 copies which placed on number 2 at the Oricon Weekly Album charts, behind Hikaru Utada's Utada Hikaru Single Collection Vol. 2, which sold over 231,000 copies in the same week. This is the first time in 6 years and 9 months for a foreign Asian girl group to sell over 100,000 copies on its first week in Japan since Twelve Girls Band did back in March 2004 with the release of their album Kikō: Shining Energy. The album's first week sales doubles that of Kara Best 2007–2010 first week sales (51,000 copies) which was released back in September.

The album spent 14 weeks in the Top 10 spot of the Oricon Weekly Album charts. It was eventually certified Platinum by the RIAJ. On February 12, 2011, the album eventually peaked at number one after spending over 12 weeks in the charts, making it their first number-one album. The album managed to sell over 300,000 copies making them the first foreign female group to sell over 300,000 copies since Destiny's Child's Number 1's (2005).

== Track listings ==
Girl's Talk track listing
No.	Title	Lyrics	Music	Length
1.	"Jumping (ジャンピン)"	Song Soo-yoon, Han Jae-ho, Kim Seung-soo, Natsumi Watanabe	Han Jae-ho, Kim Seung-soo	2:58
2.	"Mister (ミスター)"	Song Soo-yoon, Han Jae-ho, Kim Seung-soo, Natsumi Watanabe, PA-NON	Han Jae-ho, Kim Seung-soo	3:12
3.	"Baby I Need You (ベイビー・アイ・ニード・ユー)"	Natsumi Watanabe	ArmySlick	3:44
4.	"Sweet Days (スウィートデイズ)"	Hwang Hyun, Kaori Moriwaka	Song Soo-yoon	3:28
5.	"SOS"	Shoko Fujibayashi	Jam9, ArmySlick	4:42
6.	"Love Is (ラブ・イズ)"	Song Soo-yoon, Narumi	Han Jae-ho, Kim Seung-soo	3:25
7.	"Binks (ビンクス)"	Pa-Non, Song Soo-yoon	Han Jae-ho, Kim Seung-soo	3:13
8.	"Umbrella (アンブレラ)"	Song Soo-yoon, Natsumi Watanabe	Han Jae-ho, Kim Seung-soo	3:45
9.	"Burn (バーン)"	Song Soo-yoon, Kenn Kato	Han Jae-ho, Kim Seung-soo	3:30
10.	"Lupin (ルパン)"	Song Soo-yoon, Natsumi Watanabe	Han Jae-ho, Kim Seung-soo	3:12
Total length:				35:26

Version C First Press bonus tracks
No.	Title	Length
11.	"Sweet Days" (Korean)	3:29
12.	"Love Is" (Korean)	3:27
13.	"Binks" (Korean)	3:14
Total length:		45:43

Version A DVD
No.	Title	Length
1.	""Jumpin'" Music Video (au Smart Sports ver.)"
2.	"Making of "Jumpin'" Music Video (au Smart Sports ver.)"
3.	"Offshoot footage from the album cover shoot"

== Charts ==
=== Weekly charts ===
Chart (2010)	Peak position
Japanese Albums (Oricon)	2
Taiwanese Combo Albums (G-Music)	3

=== Year-end charts ===
Chart (2010)	Position
Japanese Albums (Oricon)	45

Chart (2011)	Position
Japanese Albums (Oricon)	22

== Sales and certifications ==
Region	Certification	Certified units/sales
Japan (RIAJ)	2× Platinum	443,491
