= Move Again =

EP by Kara
- Released: November 29, 2022 (KR); December 21, 2022 (JP)
- Recorded: 2022
- Studio: RBW (Seoul); MonoTree (Seoul)
- Genre: Dance-pop
- Length: 13:29 (KR); 9:59 (JP)
- Language: Korean
- Label: RBW

Kara chronology
Girl's Story (2015)	Move Again (2022)

Singles from Move Again
- 1. "When I Move" Released: November 29, 2022

Japanese edition cover

Professional ratings
Review scores
Source	Rating
NME	3/5 stars

Move Again is the eighth extended play released by the South Korean girl group Kara, released on November 29, 2022, through RBW, marketed as their "15th Anniversary Special Album". The EP marks their first release since their disbandment in 2016, their first to feature Nicole and Jiyoung since their departure in 2014, and their first to be released following the death of member Hara in November 2019. A Japanese version of the album released on December 21.

== Background ==
On September 19, 2022, it was announced that Kara would be releasing an album under RBW to commemorate the 15th anniversary of their debut in November, featuring the return of members Nicole and Jiyoung after their departure in April 2014. The album's official title and release date were revealed on October 18.

On November 11, it was confirmed the group had finished filming their comeback MV. On November 14, the group's full comeback schedule was released to Twitter.

== Promotion ==
Kara held their first comeback stage at the 2022 MAMA Awards. The group will also hold fan meetings in Fukuoka, Yokohama, etc. starting in Osaka, Japan on February 23, 2023.

== Accolades ==
Music program awards
Song	Program	Date	Ref.
"When I Move"	Music Bank	December 16, 2022	

Year-end lists
Critic/Publication	List	Rank	Ref.
Billboard	The 25 Best K-Pop Songs of 2022	19th	

== Track listing ==
Move Again track listing
No.	Title	Lyrics	Music	Arrangement	Length
1.	"Happy Hour"	Park Gyu-ri; Han Seung-yeon; Nicole; Kang Ji-young; Heo Young-ji; Hollin (MonoTree)	Hollin	Hollin	3:32
2.	"When I Move"	Hadar Adora; Anton Goransson; Isabella Sjostrand; Brandon "B Ham" Hamlin; Y0ung; Kang; Kim Boa; Nicole	Adora; Goransson; Sjostrand; Hamlin; Y0ung; Kang; Kim B.	Adora; Goransson; Sjostrand; Hamlin	2:58
3.	"Shout It Out"	Steven Lee; DearS; Young; Nicole	Lee; Laurell Barker; Joe Lawrence	Lawrence; Lee	3:19
4.	"Oxygen"	Kim Su-bin (Aiming); Kang	Kim Chang-rak (Aiming); Kim S.	Kim S.; Jo Se-hee (Aiming)	3:40
Total length:					13:29

Move Again (Japan Edition) track listing
No.	Title	Lyrics	Music	Arrangement	Length
1.	"When I Move (Japanese version)"	Y0ung; Nicole; Katsuhiko Yamamoto	Adora; Goransson; Sjostrand; Hamlin; Y0ung; Kang; Kim B.	Adora; Goransson; Sjostrand; Hamlin	2:58
3.	"Queens"		Katsuhiko Yamamoto; Ida Tomoko; Lotte Mørkved		3:10
4.	"Queens (Remix)"		Yamamoto; Tomoko; Mørkved		3:50
Total length:					9:59

== Charts ==
=== Weekly charts ===
Weekly chart performance for Move Again
Chart (2022)	Peak position
Japanese Digital Albums (Oricon)	13
Japanese Hot Albums (Billboard Japan)	28
South Korean Albums (Circle)	16

Weekly chart performance for Move Again (Japanese edition)
Chart (2023)	Peak position
Japanese Albums (Oricon)	7
Japanese Combined Albums (Oricon)	8
Japanese Hot Albums (Billboard Japan)	7

=== Monthly charts ===
Monthly chart performance for Move Again
Chart (2022)	Peak position
South Korean Albums (Circle)	95

Monthly chart performance for Move Again (Japanese edition)
Chart (2022)	Peak position
Japanese Albums (Oricon)	21
