= Jet Coaster Love =

- Regular Edition cover

Single by Kara

from the album Super Girl
- B-side: "Ima, Okuritai 「Arigatou」"; "SOS" (remix)
- Released: April 6, 2011 (Japan)
- Recorded: January 2011
- Genre: Pop, dance-pop
- Length: 3:41
- Label: Universal Sigma
- Songwriters: Hwang Seong Je; Natsumi Watanabe; Yu Shimoji; Simon Isogai

Kara Japanese singles chronology
"Jumping" (2010)	"Jet Coaster Love" (2011)	"Go Go Summer!" (2011)

Music video
- "Jet Coaster Love" on YouTube

"Jet Coaster Love" (ジェットコースターラブ, Jetto Kōsutā Rabu) is the third Japanese single of South Korean girl group Kara. The single was originally set to be released on March 23, 2011, but following the 2011 Great Tohoku Earthquake and tsunami disaster in Japan, the physical single was rescheduled to April 6, 2011. In order to help out the areas affected by the disaster, the group had decided to donate all proceeds from the sales of this single, both physical and digital, to relief efforts. It eventually became the group's first single to reach #1 on Oricon Daily and Weekly charts.

It was released in three different editions, 1 regular edition and 2 limited editions. The full single (excluding the bonus track) was released on iTunes Japan on March 16, 2011.

== Background ==
It was announced on January 26, 2011, that TBC (also known as 'Tokyo Beauty Center'), the largest aesthetic beauty salon chain in Japan is scheduled to release a commercial featuring all five members of group next month despite the ongoing controversy the group was facing with three of its members desiring to terminate their contracts. The group teamed up with TBC to headline the campaign, “Kirei wa, TBC kara” (“Beauty comes from TBC”). The group's name “Kara”, which also means “from” in Japanese, was cleverly incorporated into the slogan in order to further promote the group's position as spokespersons. However, it was still undecided as to whether or not the commercial theme song, "Jet Coaster Love", will be distributed digitally in the future.

It was later announced that it would be the group's third Japanese and will be receiving a physical release on March 23, 2011. It will be released in three different editions, 1 regular edition and 2 limited editions. The regular edition will feature a bonus track, “SOS (Army Slick’s 2011 bavtronic mix)". The Limited Edition A will come with a DVD with the promotional video, dance version and behind the scenes footage, and the Limited Edition B will come with a 32-pages photobook.

Following the 2011 Tōhoku earthquake and tsunami in Japan, Universal Sigma made an announcement that it will be postponing a number of its releases to different dates including Jet Coaster Love to April 6, 2011. The group later announced that they will be donating all their income from the single (both digital and physical) in order to help out with the Japanese relief and rescue efforts.

== Composition ==
The song, "Jet Coaster Love", is an upbeat tune which urges the listener to “fall in love”.

The B-side song "Ima Okuritai 「Arigatou」" was used as the ending theme song of the group's Japanese drama URAKARA. It was later included on the group's third Korean album Step as a bonus track under the title of "With My Heart (Dear Kamilia)" (Korean: 내 마음을 담아서 (Dear Kamilia)).

The first press of the regular edition comes with a bonus track, "SOS (Army Slick’s 2011 bavtronic mix)", a remix version of the song "SOS", which was previously included on their first Japanese studio album Girl's Talk.

== Music video ==
A one-minute preview of the promotional video for "Jet Coaster Love" was featured on Japan's Mezamashi TV on March 1, 2011. The full version was eventually released on March 3, 2011. The following week after the single's release, a music video for the B-Side, "Ima, Okuritai 「Arigatou」", premiered in MTV Japan on April 12, 2011. Both music videos were directed by Joo Hee Sun and were simultaneously filmed inside the studios of Seoul, South Korea.

"Jet Coaster Love" begins with the girls grooming themselves in front of a mirror at a beauty salon. Their reclining chairs then suddenly move on their own and takes the group into a dream amusement park called "Jet Coaster Love" as the song begins to play. After arriving at the entrance, the girls are seen wearing white formal uniforms and then rides a Carousel adorned with origami-like swans serving as seats. In another scene the members are individually seen sitting inside a white room filled with glittering disco balls while dressed in angelic white clothing.

"Ima, Okuritai 「Arigatou」" begins with the members preparing a letter and are wondering what to write in it. During the bridge, the members begin to write the letter using a quill pen and then places it inside an envelope before sealing it with a wax stamp. Near the end they are seen standing under a white tree dressed in white bridal gown outfits while singing the song.

== Live performances ==
The group was originally scheduled to perform on Asahi TV's Music Station on March 18, 2011. However following the 2011 Great Tohoku Earthquake and tsunami disaster, the group was forced to postpone all promotional activities for Japan.

On June 11, 2011, Music Station officially announced that KARA would indeed be returning in Japan and will be appearing on the show next week to perform a special medley of "Jet Coaster Love" along with their newest single, "Go Go Summer!". This marked as the group's first live appearance and performance of the single.

On July 25, 2011, KARA appeared on HEY! HEY! HEY! Music Champ's 700th special episode. On the program, the group sang “Jet Coaster Love” live and also featured a hilarious lengthy interview segment.

The group also performed a medley of Jet Coaster Love and hit single Mister at the 62nd Kōhaku Uta Gassen. It was their first appearance at the program as they opened the second half.

== Chart performance ==
On February 11, 2011, the single entered the Recochoku "Chika Uta ®" at number-one. Following its physical release, it debuted at number-two on the Oricon Daily Singles Chart selling over 47,810 copies behind SDN48's Ai, Juseyo. On April 7, 2011, it peaked at number-one on the Oricon Daily Singles Chart selling over 28,643 copies on the second day of its release. Popular Korean news portal 'Newsen' praised the group, stating that despite all of the circumstances during the release of the single " KARA’s #1 ranking in both the single and album categories is a great feat [...]this is the first record from the current Hallyu girl group frenzy lineup." The single also debuted at #6 on the Billboard Japan Hot 100 and has peaked at #2 the following week. By the end of the first week of its release, Jet Coaster Love placed at #1 in Oricon Weekly Chart with 122,820 copies sold, setting another record to KARA for the first foreign girl group to get #1 in Oricon chart since 1968, when Oricon Single Ranking was created.

The single was certified as gold by the RIAJ twice in April 2011, once for physical copies shipped, and the second time as a digital download to cellphones.

== Track listing ==
Japanese single:
No.	Title	Lyrics	Music	Length
1.	"Jet Coaster Love (ジェットコースターラブ)"	Natsumi Watanabe, Yu Shimoji	Hwang Seong Je	3:41
2.	"Ima, Okuritai 「Arigatou」(今、贈りたい「ありがとう」)" ("Now I Say 'Thank You'")	Simon Isogai	Simon Isogai	5:52
3.	"Jet Coaster Love (Instrumental)"			3:41
4.	"Ima, Okuritai 「Arigatou」 (Instrumental)"			5:53
Total length:				19:04

Bonus Track (Limited Edition Version C)
No.	Title	Lyrics	Music	Length
5.	"SOS" (Army Slick’s 2011 bavtronic mix)	Shoko Fujibayashi	Army Slick	5:03
Total length:				24:06

DVD (Limited Edition Version A)
No.	Title	Length
1.	"Jet Coaster Love" (Music video)
2.	"Jet Coaster Love" (Music Video - Dance version)
3.	"Jet Coaster Love" (Music Video - Behind the Scenes)

=== Charts ===
Song	Peak chart position	
Song	JPN	
Song	RIAJ	Billboard Japan
"Jet Coaster Love"	1	2
"Ima, Okuritai 「Arigatou」"	17	-

=== Year-end charts ===
Chart (2011)	Position
Oricon Yearly singles	26
Billboard Japan Hot 100 Year-End	12
Billboard Japan Hot Singles Sales Year-End	17
RIAJ Digital Track Chart yearly top 100	23

=== Oricon Chart ===
Oricon Chart	Peak	Debut sales	Sales total	Chart run
Daily Singles Chart	1	47,810	225,521+	33 weeks
Weekly Singles Chart	1	122,820	225,521+	33 weeks
Monthly Singles Chart	2	172,379	225,521+	33 weeks
Yearly Singles Chart	26	225,175	225,521+	33 weeks

=== Sales and certifications ===
Chart	Amount
RIAJ physical single	Gold (100,000+)
RIAJ ringtone downloads	
RIAJ full-length cellphone downloads	Platinum (250,000+)
RIAJ PC downloads	Platinum (250,000+)

== Release ==
Country	Date	Format	Label
Japan	March 16, 2011	Digital download	Universal Sigma
Japan	April 6, 2011	CD single	Universal Sigma
