= The First Bloooooming =

- From left to right: Nicole, Han Seungyeon, Park Gyuri, Kim Sunghee

Studio album by Kara
- Released: March 29, 2007
- Recorded: 2007
- Genre: K-pop; R&B
- Length: 36:15
- Label: DSP
- Producer: Lee Ho Yeon

Kara chronology
The First Bloooooming (2007)	Rock U (2008)

Singles from The First Bloooooming
- 1. "Break It" Released: March 29, 2007; 2. "If U Wanna" Released: June 8, 2007; 3. "Secret World" Released: July 26, 2007

The First Bloooooming (also titled "The First Blooming", later retitled as "Blooming") is the debut studio album by South Korean girl group Kara, released on March 29, 2007, alongside the lead single "Break It". It is the only album which features original member Kim Sunghee who left in 2008 due to educational purposes. The album was not a commercial success and went unrecognized by the public.

== Background ==
Having debuted under the same company as their predecessors, Fin.K.L, many comparisons between the two groups were made, even paralleling each individual Kara member to a Fin.KL member. Kara showcased a "strong female" and mature image through the R&B style of their debut single "Break It".

== Chart performance ==
The Gaon Music Chart, which is now known as the Circle Music Chart, was launched in February 2010 as the official chart for South Korea, almost 3 years after Kara debuted. The First Blooming entered at number 11 on the Gaon Album Chart for the third week of 2010 and peaked at number 2 for the week ending January 23, 2010. It spent two non-consecutive weeks in the Top 5 and three non-consecutive weeks in the Top 10 of the chart in 2010.

== Track listing ==
No.	Title	Writer(s)	Composer(s)	Length
1.	"Broken Promise (못 지킨 말)"	Kim Tae Yun	Kim Suk Chan	3:53
2.	"Break It"	Lee Dong Soo	Han Sang Won	3:15
3.	"If U Wanna (맘에 들면)"	Han Sang Won, Lee Dong Soo	Han Sang Won	3:43
4.	"Secret World"	Kim Hee Sun, Cha Sang Min	Kim Tae Hyun	3:20
5.	"Don't Be Shy"	Jung Mi Ra	AND	3:54
6.	"Two of Us (우리 둘)"	Han Sang Won, Lee Dong Soo	Han Sang Won	3:17
7.	"I'll Be There"	Bang Seun Chul	Bang Seun Chul	3:38
8.	"Tear Eraser (눈물 지우개)"	Yoon Gyung	Lee Byung Joon	4:03
9.	"Break It (Instrumental)"		Han Sang Won	3:17
10.	"Broken Promise (못 지킨 말) (Instrumental)"		Kim Suk Chan	3:53
Total length:				36:15

== Charts ==
=== Weekly charts ===
Chart (2010)	Peak position
South Korea (Gaon Album Chart)	2
