= Winter Magic (song) =

- Regular edition cover

Single by Kara

from the album Super Girl
- B-side: "Whisper" "Winter Magic (X'mas version)"
- Released: October 19, 2011
- Recorded: 2011
- Genre: Pop, Christmas
- Length: 4:53
- Label: Universal Sigma
- Songwriter: Simon Isogai

Kara Japanese singles chronology
"Go Go Summer!" (2011)	"Winter Magic" (2011)	"Speed Up / Girl's Power" (2012)

Music video
- "Winter Magic" (preview) at YouTube

"Winter Magic" (ウィンターマジック, Wintā Majikku) is the fifth Japanese single by South Korean girl group Kara. It was included in their second Japanese album, Super Girl (2011). It was released digitally on October 12, 2011, and physically on October 19, 2011. It was released in three different editions.

== Background ==
Information about a fifth Japanese single first surfaced on the internet when member Nicole tweeted to fellow member JiYoung on Twitter, "Starting from now, spend all your time together with me!!!! You're mine You're mine You're mine!!", to which she replied, "Unnie (Nicole), you too, you're mine you're mine you're mine! Bounce, bounce, be~ mine~~". Nicole then tweeted back by saying "I see, therefore unnie (herself) will take responsibility for you until the end [..]". Fellow member Goo Hara also tweeted in regards to the posts made by her fellow members: "Heehee, such cute kids. Giving hints like that is... ㅋㅋㅋㅋㅋ(*laughs*)". This led to many fans believing that the members were hinting on possible lyrics for their next single that will be released in the future.

On September 16, 2011, Universal Music Japan officially announced on the group's Japanese homepage that they will be releasing their fifth Japanese single on October 19 and will be titled "Winter Magic". The album covers for the album were then unveiled on September 27.

The song first hit the Japan radio and immediately afterwards a radio rip surfaced online at September 24.

== Music video ==
A teaser for the music video was released on Universal Music Japan's YouTube channel on October 10, 2011. The full music video was released on October 12.

=== Synopsis ===
The video begins with the group, dressed in white night gowns, singing together to the intro of the song while sitting warmly inside a modern living room near a fireplace. As the song begins, the scene shifts towards morning where each member is seen emerging from their own houses dressed in warm winter clothing. They then head to the town by themselves to wait for someone. The video ends with someone finally arriving and each of the group members' smiles can be seen.

== Live performances ==
The group made their first live performance of the song at TV Asahi's Music Station on October 14, 2011 and made another performances on the shows Count Down TV in October 23, on Music Japan and made an apparition in the show Music Lovers, both in October 24.

The group also appeared at an all star Christmas live event called "LAWSON present MUSIC FOR ALL, ALL FOR ONE" supported by Sukapaa" which was held during a three-day span between December 23 and 25 at the Yoyogi National Gymnasium. They appeared on the 24th where they performed the X'mas version of the song along with their past singles and hits.

== Track listing ==
Japanese single:
No.	Title	Lyrics	Music	Arrangement	Length
1.	"Winter Magic (ウィンターマジック)"	Simon Isogai	Simon Isogai	ArmySlick, M.I.	4:53
2.	"Whisper (ウィスパー)"	Nice73	GEN	GEN	3:37
3.	"Winter Magic" (Instrumental)				4:53
4.	"Whisper" (Instrumental)				3:38
Total length:					17:00

Bonus Track (Limited Edition Version C)
No.	Title	Lyrics	Music	Arrangement	Length
5.	"Winter Magic (ウィンターマジック)" (X'mas version)	Simon Isogai	Simon Isogai	Yosuke Nimbari	5:07
Total length:					22:07

DVD (Limited Edition Version A)
No.	Title	Length
1.	"Winter Magic" (Music video)	4:58
2.	"Winter Magic" (Music video - Close-Up Version)	4:53
3.	"Winter Magic" (Music video - Behind the Scenes)	6:50

== Chart performance and sales ==
Before its full release, the song had already topped the Recochoku mobile daily chart for the most ringtone downloads.

=== Oricon Chart ===
Released	Oricon Chart	Peak	Debut Sales	Sales Total	Chart Run
October 19, 2011	Daily Singles Chart	2	78,148	124,965+	16 weeks
October 19, 2011	Weekly Singles Chart	3	78,148	124,965+	16 weeks
October 19, 2011	Monthly Singles Chart	5	78,148	124,965+	16 weeks
October 19, 2011	Yearly Singles Chart	64	78,148	124,965+	16 weeks

=== Other charts ===
Chart	Peak position
Billboard Japan Hot 100	2
Billboard Japan Hot 100 Year-End	53
Billboard Japan Hot Singles Sales Year-End	50
RIAJ Digital Track Chart weekly top 100	2
RIAJ Digital Track Chart weekly top 100; Winter Magic (X'mas version)	67
RIAJ Digital Track Chart yearly top 100	65

=== Sales and certifications ===
Chart	Amount
RIAJ physical single	Gold (100,000+)
RIAJ ringtone downloads	
RIAJ full-length cellphone downloads	Gold (100,000+)
RIAJ PC downloads	Gold (100,000+)

== Release history ==
Country	Date	Format	Label
Japan	September 29, 2011	Ringtone	Universal Sigma
Japan	October 12, 2011	Digital download (Song only)	Universal Sigma
Japan	October 19, 2011	Digital download, CD single	Universal Sigma
