= Super Girl (album) =

- Regular edition cover

Studio album by Kara
- Released: November 23, 2011
- Recorded: 2010–2011
- Genre: Pop, dance-pop
- Length: 40:53
- Language: Japanese
- Label: Universal Sigma

Kara chronology
Step (2011)	Super Girl (2011)	Pandora (2012)

Singles from Super Girl
- 1. "Jet Coaster Love" Released: April 6, 2011; 2. "Go Go Summer!" Released: June 22, 2011; 3. "Winter Magic" Released: October 19, 2011

Super Girl (スーパーガール, Sūpā Gāru) is the second Japanese studio album and fifth overall studio album by South Korean girl group Kara. It was released digitally on November 16, 2011 and physically on November 23, 2011. A special Tour Edition of the album was released on April 11, 2012.

== Background and recording ==
On October 24, DSP Media announced on the group's official website that their second Japanese full-length album is slated for release on November 23. In addition, the album will include all of the group's past three singles that were released on the same year along with their B-sides. The following day, album covers and track list were unveiled on the group's official homepage by Universal Music Japan. The album was nominated on 2012 MTV Video Music Awards Japan on the category Album of the Year.

== Composition ==
The album includes the songs from the group's last three singles: "Jet Coaster Love", "Go Go Summer!", and "Winter Magic". It also includes their corresponding B-side songs from these singles which are "Ima, Okuritai 「Arigatou」", "Girls Be Ambitious", and "Whisper". Other tracks are brand new songs such as "Dreamin' Girl" and "Do It! Do It!".

The album was released in three limited editions: a CD+DVD, CD+Photobook (36-pages) and a CD-Only First Press, all coming with three bonus tracks and a regular edition: CD-Only Normal Press coming with no bonus tracks. All editions come with a 20-page lyrics booklet.

== Singles ==
Three singles were released before the album. The first single, "Jet Coaster Love", was released on April 6, 2011. The song is described as an R&B track with an upbeat tune that urges the listener to "fall in love". Promotions for the single were hindered due to the 2011 Great Tohoku Earthquake and tsunami disaster in Japan so instead the group decided to donate all proceeds from the sales of the single, both physical and digital, to relief efforts. Despite the lack of promotion, the single received commercial success as it topped the Oricon Daily and Weekly charts making it the group's first number one single in Japan.

The second single, "Go Go Summer!", was released on June 22, 2011. The single was also used as a commercial song for LG's new phone "Optimus Bright" where the group also served as models. The single performed well digitally as it has topped the Recochoku's monthly chart of July, as well as topping 4 other charts in 'Ringtone', 'Full Version Ringtones', 'Video Clip', and 'Callback Tone' earning the group a Recochoku Award. It was also nominated for the Best Song Award at the 53rd annual Japanese Record Awards making it the group's first song to be receive a nomination and was their most successful one of the year.

"Winter Magic", served as the last single to be released before the album. It was released on October 19, 2011.

== Commercial performance ==
The album drew 360,000 pre-order sales the day before its release. The album went on to debut at number one on the Oricon Daily album chart, selling 73,076 copies on its first day. The album continued its consistent sales throughout its first week and was certified platinum on the sixth day of its release with 259,602 copies sold. It eventually placed at number one on the Oricon Weekly album chart by selling over 275,000 copies on its first week.

According to Oricon, this is the group's second time on the top of the charts, as their third single, "Jet Coaster Love" reached number one in the single chart back in April 2011. With this achievement, the girls has become the newest foreign female group to dominate both the single and album rankings in over a year. The record was previously set over 30 years ago by The Nolans with their single, "I'm in the Mood for Dancing", and the LP, "Gotta Pull Myself Together". Additionally, the girls have set a new record for their first week sales, and has become the top selling foreign female group of 2011. Their sales have surpassed fellow South Korean group SNSD's debut album Girls' Generation which sold 232,000 copies on its first week. The album rose to top position once again during its fourth week on the chart.

== Awards ==
Year	Organization	Category	Result	Ref.
2012	MTV Video Music Awards Japan	Album of the Year	Nominated	
2013	Japan Gold Disc Awards	Album of the Year	Won	
2013	Japan Gold Disc Awards	Best 3 Albums	Won	

== Track listing ==
No.	Title	Lyrics	Music	Length
1.	"Jet Coaster Love (ジェットコースターラブ)"	Natsumi Watanabe, Yu Shimoji	Hwang Seong-je	3:40
2.	"Winter Magic (ウィンターマジック)"	Simon Isogai	ArmySlick, M.I.	4:52
3.	"Go Go Summer! (GO GO サマー!)"	Yu Shimoji	Han Sang-won, Lee Sang-ho & Kimzart	3:20
4.	"Dreamin' Girl (ドリーミンガール)"	Litz	Ryu Hyun-sang	3:15
5.	"Ima, Okuritai 'Arigatō' (今、贈りたい「ありがとう」)" ("Now I Say 'Thank You'")	Simon Isogai	Simon Isogai	5:51
6.	"Only For You (オンリーフォーユー)"	EMI K.Lynn	Ryonosuke Hirama	3:41
7.	"Whisper (ウィスパー)"	Nice73	GEN	3:37
8.	"Missing (ミッシング)"	Kenn Kato, Jam9	Jam9, ArmySlick	5:04
9.	"Do It! Do It!"	Mohombi Moupondo, Victoria Sandstrom, Joachim Alte, Tom Roger Rogstad, Litz, EMYLI	M. Moupondo, V. Sandstrom, J. Alte, T.R. Rogstad	3:57
10.	"Girls Be Ambitious (ガールズビーアンビシャス!)"	PA-NON	Hwang S.J.	3:36
Total length:				40:53

All lyrics are written by Song Soo Yun; all music is composed by Han Jae-Ho and Kim Seung Soo

Limited editions bonus tracks
No.	Title	Lyrics	Music	Length
11.	"Mister (ミスター)"	Song Soo Yun, Han Jae-Ho, Kim Seung Soo, Natsumi Watanabe, PA-NON	Han Jae-Ho, Kim Seung Soo	3:13
12.	"Jumping (ジャンピン)"	Song Soo Yun, Han Jae-Ho, Kim Seung Soo, Natsumi Watanabe	Han Jae-Ho, Kim Seung Soo	2:58
13.	"Step"	Song Soo Yun	Han Jae-Ho, Kim Seung Soo	3:24
Total length:				50:59

DVD (type A)
No.	Title	Length
1.	"Go Go Summer!" (music video – director's cut)
2.	"Jet Coaster Love" (live performance (CJ Media Japan (Mnet) 「JJ's M Studio」))
3.	"Winter Magic" (music video – close-up version)
4.	"Step" (music video)
5.	"Super Girl album jacket shooting footage" (offshoot movie)
6.	"Winter Magic jacket shooting footage" (offshoot movie)

Japan Tour Special Edition bonus track
No.	Title	Lyrics	Music	Length
14.	"We're with You"	Han Jae-Ho, Kim Seung Soo	Han Jae-Ho, Kim Seung Soo	3:23
Total length:				53:49

Japan Tour Special Edition – DVD
No.	Title	Length
1.	"KARA Japan History"
2.	"We're With You" (music video)
3.	"We're With You" (art movie)
4.	"We're With You" (Gyuri off-shot version)
5.	"We're With You" (Hara off-shot version)
6.	"We're With You" (SeungYeon off-shot version)
7.	"We're With You" (Nicole off-shot version)
8.	"We're With You" (JiYoung off-shot version)

== Charts ==
=== Weekly charts ===
Chart (2011–12)	Peak position
Japanese Albums (Oricon)	1
Japanese Top Albums (Billboard)	1

=== Year-end charts ===
Chart (2011)	Position
Japanese Albums (Oricon)	7

Chart (2012)	Position
Japanese Albums (Oricon)	18
Japanese Top Albums (Billboard)	4

== Sales and certifications ==
Region	Certification	Certified units/sales
Japan (RIAJ)	3× Platinum	746,246

== Release history ==
Country	Date	Format	Label
Japan	November 16, 2011	Digital download	Universal Sigma
Japan	November 23, 2011	CD	Universal Sigma
Japan	April 11, 2012	CD + DVD (Tour Special Edition)	Universal Sigma
