= Step (Kara song) =

- Japanese digital single cover

Single by Kara

from the album Step
- Released: September 6, 2011
- Recorded: 2011
- Genre: Dance-pop; EDM
- Length: 3:21
- Label: DSP; CJ E&M
- Songwriter(s): Han Jae-ho; Kim Seung-soo
- Producer(s): Sweetune

Kara singles chronology
"Jumping" (2010)	"Step" (2011)	"Pandora" (2012)

Music video
- "Step'" on YouTube

"Step" is a song by South Korean girl group Kara from their third Korean-language studio album (fourth overall) of the same name. It was released as the lead single from the album on September 6, 2011, via DSP Media. The song was both written and produced by Han Jae-ho and Kim Seung-soo of Sweetune, who had worked on many of the group's previous records. In Japan, the song was made available to digital platforms on February 22, 2012, although no physical single was released for the song.

Commercially, "Step" peaked at number two on both Gaon and the K-pop Hot 100, garnering over 2,780,000 downloads throughout 2011. In Japan, it also peaked at number two on the RIAJ digital chart and number 38 on the Japan Hot 100. The song has been positively received by critics—it was ranked at number 14 on Spin's list of 21 Greatest K-pop Songs of All Time and number 17 on Billboard's list of Top 100 K-pop Songs of the 2010s. An arranged version of "Step" was featured in the international arcade music games DJ Max Technika 3 and Pump It Up Fiesta 2.

== Background and artwork ==
On August 22, "Step" was announced by DSP Media as the lead single for the group's third full-length album, titled "Step", slated for release on September 6. The song was also included onto the limited edition of the group's second Japanese studio album, Super Girl. The Japanese version of the song was released on February 29, 2012, and is also included as a bonus track on the group's sixth Japanese single, "Speed Up / Girl's Power".

== Critical reception ==
Jen Erenza from Ryan Seacrest Blog described the video as "colorful" with "out-of-this-world scenes" and asserted, "With their super cute styles and head-bopping music, there is no doubt their popularity will rise stupendously!". Edge Media named it the 10th best K-pop song of 2011, while Spin ranked it number 14 in their list of the 21 greatest K-pop songs of all time. "Step" was ranked number 17 in Billboard's 2019 ranking of best K-pop songs of the decade, with the publication writing "In an industry defined by genre-blending and experimentalism, 'Step' holds nothing back while surging forward in confidence that it is one of the purest pop confections out of K-pop this decade."

== Music video ==
Kara as they appear in the music video

The full music video officially premiered on September 6. The video features the group dancing in front of microphones while dressed in deep blue clothes with colorful patterns. In the background, there are bright lighting signs that show the names of the group's past hit songs. In other scenes, the group can be seen individually in a bright room with colored walling dressed in colored neon clothing while jumping up. During the bridge of the song, the girls are seen dressed in glittering dresses and holding onto microphone stands in a plain white room.

== Live performances ==
The group began performing the song on TV music programs starting in September 15, on Mnet's M! Countdown. They also performed "Date (My Boy)" and "With My Heart (Dear Kamilia)" as a part of the group's performance. Due to the group's commitments with their schedule in Japan, they only performed the song on a few music shows for a total of three weeks.

== Accolades ==
Music program awards
Program	Date	Ref.
M Countdown	September 15, 2011	
M Countdown	September 22, 2011	
Music Bank	September 16, 2011	
Music Bank	September 23, 2011	
Inkigayo	September 25, 2011	

== Charts ==
=== Weekly charts ===
Chart (2011–12)	Peak position
Japan (Japan Hot 100)	38
Japan (RIAJ Digital Track Chart)	2
South Korea (Gaon)	2
South Korea (K-pop Hot 100)	2

Chart (2022)	Peak position
South Korea (Gaon)	170
South Korea (Billboard)	20

=== Yearly charts ===
Chart (2011)	Position
South Korea (Gaon)	54

== Release history ==
Region	Release date	Format	Label
South Korea	September 6, 2011	Digital download	DSP Media
Japan	February 22, 2012 (Recochoku); February 29, 2012 (iTunes)	Digital download	Universal Sigma
