= Rock U =

Kara
- From left to right: Nicole, Han Seung-Yeon, Park Gyuri, Kang Jiyoung, Goo Hara

EP by Kara
- Released: July 25, 2008
- Recorded: 2008
- Genre: Dance-pop
- Length: 17:51
- Language: Korean
- Label: DSP Media

Kara chronology
The First Bloooooming (2007)	Kara (2008)	Pretty Girl (2008)

Singles from Rock U
- 1. "Rock U" Released: July 25, 2008

Rock U (also known as Kara 1st Mini Album) is the first extended play by South Korean girl group Kara. It was released on July 25, 2008. Rock U was released as the lead single.

This was also the first album to feature the two new members of the group; Goo Hara and Kang Jiyoung, following the departure of former member Kim Sunghee. The release also showed a big transition from the group's original "strong female" image to a "cute and natural" appeal, shifting from the R&B sound of their debut to bubblegum pop.

== History ==
After a 10-month hiatus, Kara returned with 2 new members: 17-year-old Goo Hara and 14-year-old Kang Jiyoung. They replaced Kim Sunghee, who left for educational purposes. The song was promoted in music shows, KBS's Music Bank, MBC's Show! Music Core, SBS's Inkigayo and Mnet's M! Countdown. A new version of the song "Good Day" called "Good Day: Season 2" was released on October 13, 2008 as a digital single. A remix version of the song "What's This" entered in the special edition of the group's second EP "Pretty Girl".

== Chart performance ==
The Gaon Music Chart was launched in February 2010 as the official chart for South Korea. The album entered at number 81 for the second week of 2010 on the Gaon Album Chart and peaked at number 8 for the week ending July 3, 2010. The album spent four non-consecutive weeks in the Top 10 in 2010 and became the group's second Top 10 album on the chart.

== Track listing ==
Digital download
No.	Title	Lyrics	Music	Arrangement	Length
1.	"Rock U"	Han Jae-ho; Song Su-yun	Han Jae-ho; Song Su-yun	Han Jae-ho; Song Su-yun	3:34
2.	"Baby Boy"	Kim Hyun-seo	Kim Hyun-seo		3:49
3.	"What's This" (이게뭐야)	Han Jae-ho; Song Su-yun	Han Jae-ho; Kim Seung-soo	Han Jae-ho; Kim Seung-soo	3:24
4.	"Good Day"	Han Jae-ho; Kim Seung-soo	Han Jae-ho; Kim Seung-soo	Han Jae-ho; Kim Seung-soo	3:17
5.	"Wait"	Hwang Seong-je	Hwang Seong-je	Hwang Seong-je	3:45
Total length:					17:51

== Charts ==
Chart (2010)	Peak position
South Korea (Gaon)	8

Chart (2011)	Peak position
Japanese Albums (Oricon)	106

== Release history ==
Country	Date	Format	Label
South Korea	July 25, 2008	Digital download	CJ E&M DSP Media
South Korea	July 31, 2008	CD	CJ E&M DSP Media
Japan	February 23, 2011	CD, Digital download	Universal Sigma
Taiwan	November 7, 2022	CD, Digital download	Warner Music
