= Go Go Summer! =

- Type C and Regular edition cover

Single by Kara

from the album Super Girl
- B-side: "Girls Be Ambitious!"; "To Me"
- Released: June 22, 2011
- Genre: Pop; dance-pop
- Length: 3:20
- Label: Universal Sigma
- Songwriters: Han Sang-won; Lee Sang-ho; Kimzart; Hwang Seong-je

Kara Japanese singles chronology
"Jet Coaster Love" (2011)	"Go Go Summer!" (2011)	"Winter Magic" (2011)

"Go Go Summer!" (GO GO サマー!, Gō Gō Samā!) is a song performed by South Korean girl group Kara. It was released as the fourth Japanese single on June 29, 2011 but was earlier released digitally on iTunes Japan on June 22, 2011. It was released in four different versions, three limited editions and one regular edition.

The single went to sell over 100,000 copies during its first week becoming their second Japanese single to do so after "Jet Coaster Love", which sold 123,000 copies during its first week. It was certified Gold by the RIAJ in June 2011 for selling over 100,000 physical copies. The song earned their first nomination for "Best Song Award" at the Japan Record Awards. A 2012 version of the song was released as a digital single on July 25, 2012.

== Background ==
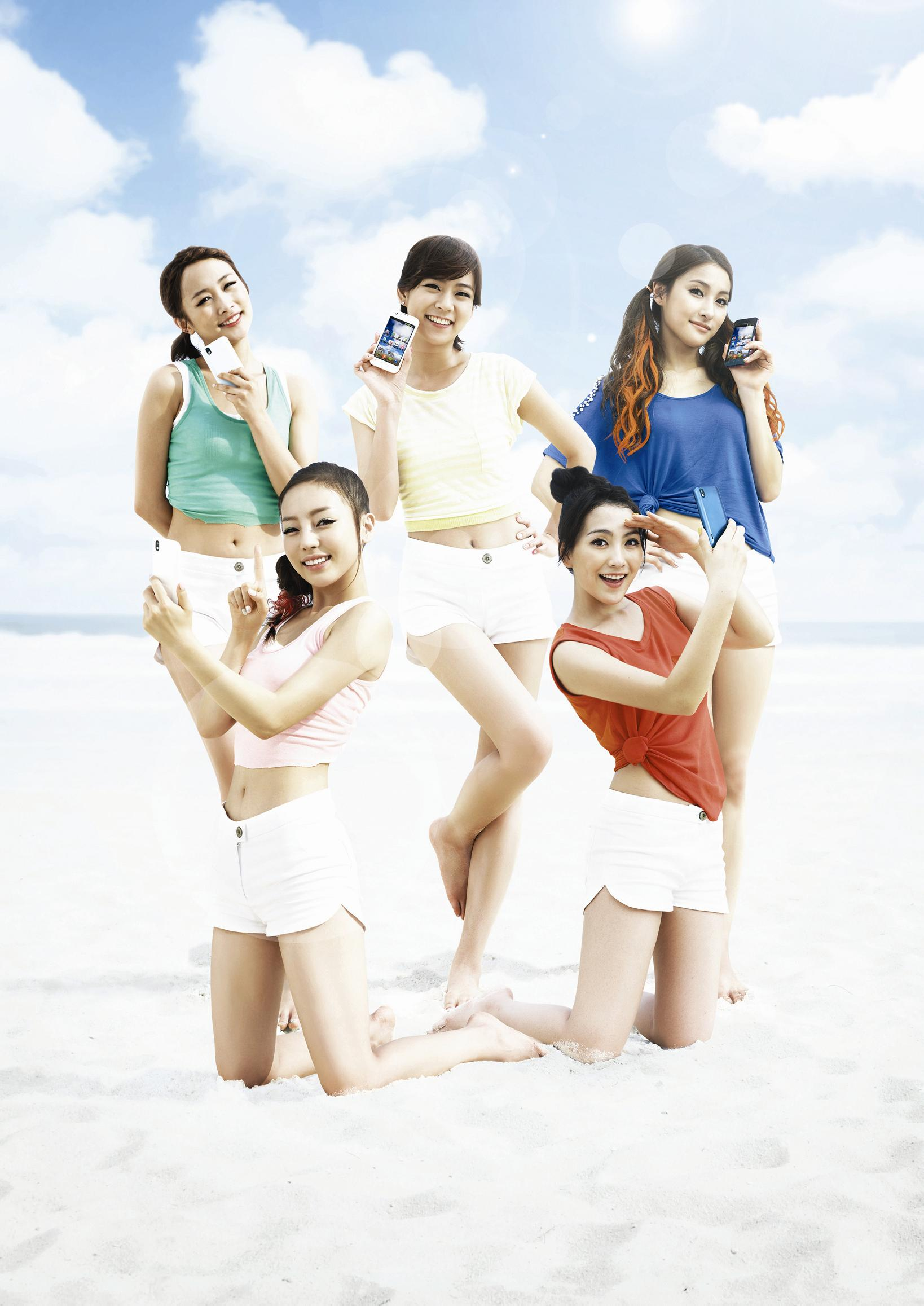
Kara promoting "Go Go Summer!"

Rumors of a fourth Japanese single first surfaced when the group was spotted leaving the Incheon International Airport and were said to be bound for Thailand to film a music video or a commercial. Despite the rumors, no official announcements or comments were made by DSP Media. On May 25, 2011, DSP Media officially announced that Kara will be releasing their fourth Japanese single in late June and will be leaving for previously arranged promotions in early June. On June 1, 2011, it was announced the group was chosen by LG as the endorser for the cellphone brand "Optimus Bright" (a Japanese variant of Optimus Black) and the single was used in the commercial for the brand.

The 2012 Version was used for Live Dam's karaoke system "Furikara". This version remains its original lyrics but with a different electronic instrumental. It was later included in their compilation album Kara Collection (2012) and their third Japanese album Girls Forever (2012). A Korean Version was performed on August 18, 2014, on the Day & Night showcase. It was also performed on May 26, 2015, on the In Love showcase.

== Composition ==
The B-side "Girls Be Ambitious" was used for promoting DARIYA's hair dye product line "Palty". "To Me" (originally titled "2Me") was included as a bonus track for the Regular CD Only First Press Edition. It is a Korean song previously released on the single "We Online OST Part 2" in South Korea and used for promoting the online game "We Online: Secret Expedition."

== Commercial performance ==
The single has sold over 100,000 copies during its first week, following their third single, "Jet Coaster Love", which sold 123,000 copies during its first week making it the group's second single most successful single. It was certified gold by the RIAJ in June 2011 for physical copies shipped to stores. It currently holds the record for the best selling single by a foreign female artist. The single has also performed well digitally as it has topped the Recochoku's monthly chart of July, as well as topping 4 other charts in 'Ringtone', 'Full Version Ringtones', 'Video Clip', and 'Callback Tone' earning the group a Recochoku Award. It also took 2nd place on the 'Waiting Call Tone'. It has also topped Mora, Musico, Music Japan, and other major record charts.

== Music video and promotion ==
On May 13, 2011, it was reported that Kara was set to film a music video for their upcoming Japanese single due to be released sometime in June. The music video was said to be filmed in Phuket, Thailand and the group was spotted leaving the Incheon International Airport during that day. A teaser of the music video was released on Universal Music Japan's YouTube channel on June 15, 2011. The full music video premiered the following day at Space Shower TV on June 16, 2011.

The group made their first live performance at TV Asahi's Music Station on June 17, 2011, where they performed a special medley with their previous single, "Jet Coaster Love". The group made another appearance on the show the following week on June 24, 2011, where they only performed the single. On June 26, 2011, the group appeared on Music Japan and performed the song. The group made an appearance on Count Down TV on July 3, 2011, where they were placed at #1 for the Recochoku "Chaku Uta ®" Top 10 chart.

== Track listing ==
Japanese CD single
No.	Title	Lyrics	Music	Length
1.	"Go Go Summer! (GO GO サマー)"	Yu Shimoji	Han Sang-won, Lee Sang-ho, Kimzart	3:20
2.	"Girls Be Ambitious! (ガールズ ビー アンビシャス)"	PA-NON	Hwang Seong-je	3:35
3.	"Go Go Summer!" (Instrumental)			3:20
4.	"Girls Be Ambitious!" (Instrumental)			3:36
Total length:				13:47

Bonus Track – Limited Edition Version C
No.	Title	Lyrics	Music	Length
5.	"To Me"	Joo Young-hoon	Joo Young-hoon	3:31
Total length:				17:18

DVD – Limited Edition Version A
No.	Title	Length
1.	"Go Go Summer!" (Music Video)
2.	"Go Go Summer!" (Music Video – Dance Version)
3.	"Go Go Summer!" (Music Video – Behind the Scenes)

2012 version
No.	Title	Lyrics	Length
1.	"Go Go Summer! 2012 (GO GO サマー！ 2012)"	Yu Shimoji	3:19

== Charts ==
=== Weekly charts ===
Chart (2011)	Peak position
Japan Singles (Oricon)	2
Japan (Japan Hot 100)	2
Japan (RIAJ Digital Track Chart)	1
Japan (RIAJ Digital Track Chart) Girls Be Ambitious!	42

=== Year-end charts ===
Chart (2011)	Position
Japan Singles (Oricon)	25
Japan (Japan Hot 100)	8
Japan Hot Singles Sales (Billboard)	14
Japan (RIAJ Digital Track Chart)	11

== Sales and certifications ==
Region	Certification	Certified units/sales
Japan (RIAJ) Physical single	Gold	230,813
Japan (RIAJ) PC download	Platinum	250,000^{*}
Japan (RIAJ) Chaku-Uta	2× Platinum	500,000^{*}
Japan (RIAJ) Chaku-Uta Full	Platinum	250,000^{*}
^{*} Sales figures based on certification alone.

== Release history ==
Version	Country	Date	Format	Label
Go Go Summer!	Japan	June 22, 2011	Digital download	Universal Sigma
Go Go Summer!	Japan	June 29, 2011	Digital download, CD single	Universal Sigma
Go Go Summer! 2012	Japan	July 18, 2012	Ringtone	Universal Sigma
Go Go Summer! 2012	Japan	July 25, 2012	Digital download	Universal Sigma
