= Lupin (EP) =

2010 EP by Kara

EP by Kara
- Released: February 17, 2010
- Recorded: 2009–10
- Genre: Dance-pop
- Length: 16:25
- Label: DSP
- Producers: Han Jae-ho; Kim Seung-soo; Han Sang-won; Lee Joo-hyung

Kara chronology
Revolution (2009)	Lupin (2010)	Kara Special Premium Box for Japan (2010)

Singles from Lupin
- 1. "Lupin" Released: February 17, 2010

Lupin (Hangul: 루팡) is the third Korean extended play (EP) by South Korean girl group Kara, released on February 17, 2010, by DSP. The concept and artwork of the album is based on French writer Maurice Leblanc's fictional gentleman thief, Arsène Lupin. The EP sold over 64,000 copies in 2010, ranking as the 16th best-selling album of the year in South Korea.

== Background and concept ==
In early February, DSP Media announced that Kara would be coming back with "Lupin" and showing a darker, more mature concept. The song was released to digital outlets on February 17, 2010, and topped various charts the following day. Han Seung-yeon noted that, although the group had a cute image with singles like "Pretty Girl" and "Mister", "Lupin" would allow the girls to portray a "chic" concept. Media reports noted that the group would be going up against Girls' Generation, who had made their comeback a few weeks earlier with "Oh!".

== Music video ==
The music video was released on February 22, garnering more than 90,000 views in the first two hours. After the popularity of the group's "butt dance" with "Mister", netizens were curious to see the choreography of "Lupin"; as such, parts of the dance, including the "Emergency Exit" dance and the "Halla" dance, were highlighted by viewers. Other moves of interest were Goo Hara's hair flip.

== Promotion ==
Kara made their comeback in late February, starting with Mnet's M! Countdown on February 25, 2010. The group then performed on all major network music shows over the weekend. On March 4, 2010, Kara won their first #1 award for "Lupin" on M! Countdown. The following week, Kara won yet another #1 award on M! Countdown, making it their second consecutive win on the program."Lupin" also gave Kara their first #1 win on Music Bank on March 12, 2010, making it the group's first win on the music show since their debut, and held onto the position for three consecutive weeks. The song also won the Mutizen award from Inkigayo. "Lupin" is among a handful of Kara tracks featured in the arcade music game, DJ Max Technika 3.

== Accolades ==
Music program awards
Song	Program	Date	Ref.
"Lupin"	M Countdown	March 4, 2010	
"Lupin"	M Countdown	March 11, 2010	
"Lupin"	Music Bank	March 12, 2010	
"Lupin"	Music Bank	March 19, 2010	
"Lupin"	Music Bank	March 26, 2010	
"Lupin"	Inkigayo	March 14, 2010	

== Track listing ==
All lyrics are written by Song Soo-yoon except track 4, which was written by Hang Sang-won.

No.	Title	Music	Length
1.	"Tasty Love"	Han Jae-ho, Kim Seung-soo	3:04
2.	"Lupin (루팡)"	Han Jae-ho, Kim Seung-soo	3:10
3.	"Umbrella"	Han Jae-ho, Kim Seung-soo	3:24
4.	"Rollin'"	Han Sang-won	3:22
5.	"Lonely"	Lee Joo-hyung	3:25
Total length:			16:25

== Charts ==
=== Album charts ===
Chart (2010)	Peak position
Japanese Weekly Albums (Oricon)	100
South Korean Weekly Albums (Gaon)	1
South Korean Monthly Albums (Gaon)	2
South Korean Yearly Albums (Gaon)	16

=== Single charts ===
"Lupin"
Chart (2010)	Peak position
South Korea (Gaon)	1
South Korea Year-end (Gaon)	18

== Sales ==
Chart	Amount
Gaon physical sales	75,197
Oricon physical sales	4,354

== Release history ==
Country	Date	Format	Label
South Korea	February 17, 2010	Digital download, CD	DSP Media
Japan	February 23, 2011	Digital download, CD	DSP Media
