= Revolution (Kara album) =

Studio album by Kara
- Released: July 30, 2009
- Recorded: 2009
- Genres: K-pop; dance-pop; electropop
- Length: 32:03
- Label: DSP
- Producers: Han Jae-Ho; Kim Seung-Soo

Kara chronology
Pretty Girl Special Edition (2009)	Revolution (2009)	Lupin (2010)

Singles from Revolution
- 1. "Wanna" Released: July 28, 2009; 2. "Mister" Released: August 15, 2009

Revolution is the second studio album and second Korean material release by South Korean girl group Kara, released on July 30, 2009, by DSP Media. The album was the band's first regular release to be recorded under the second line-up, featuring members Goo Hara and Kang Jiyoung, who replaced Kim Sunghee after her withdrawal in 2008. The album was released in Japan on February 23, 2011.

== Background and promotion ==
"Same Heart" was used in a mobile game called "i-Musician". It was first released on June 2, 2009, and was later included on the album Revolution.

The lead single "Wanna" was released on July 28, 2009, ahead of the album's official release. The music video was released on July 29, with the full album being available on July 30. Promotional activities commenced on July 31, beginning with KBS's Music Bank; the group performed both "Wanna" and "Mister". On August 30, 2009, "Wanna" won the "Mutizen Song" award from SBS's Inkigayo music program.

"Mister" proved to be popular with viewers due to a "butt dance" that is featured prominently in the choreography. Due to the overwhelming response that "Mister" received, Kara's overall popularity increased, with numerous advertisement requests coming in for the group; they had more advertisements in October 2009 than the previous two years.

== Commercial performance ==
The Gaon Music Chart was launched in February 2010 as the official chart for South Korea. The album entered at number 37 on the Gaon Album Chart for the second week of 2010 and peaked at number 3 for the week ending June 26, 2010. The album spent four non-consecutive weeks in Top 10 and became their fourth Top 10 album. The album has sold 80,645 copies as of 2011.

== Track listing ==
No.	Title	Lyrics	Music	Length
1.	"Mister (미스터)"	Song Soo Yun	Han Jae-Ho, Kim Seung-Soo	3:12
2.	"Wanna"	Song Soo Yun	Han Jae-Ho, Kim Seung-Soo	3:06
3.	"Magic (마법)"	Song Soo Yun	Han Jae-Ho, Kim Seung-Soo	3:30
4.	"Secretly Secretly (몰래몰래)"	Im-Yeong	G-High	3:08
5.	"Let It Go"	Lee Seung Min	Lee Joo-Hyung	3:08
6.	"Take a Bow"	Song Soo Yun	Han Jae-Ho, Kim Seung-Soo	3:15
7.	"Aha"	Hang Sang-won	Hang Sang-won	3:18
8.	"Same Heart (Ddokateun Mam) (똑 같은 맘)"	Song Soo Yun	Han Jae-Ho, Kim Seung-Soo	3:17
9.	"Wanna" (Instrumental)		Han Jae-Ho, Kim Seung-Soo	3:05
10.	"Magic (마법)" (Instrumental)		Han Jae-Ho, Kim Seung-Soo	3:30
Total length:				32:03

== Charts ==
=== Weekly charts ===
Chart (2010–2011)	Peak position
Japanese Albums (Oricon)	86
South Korea (Gaon)	3
