= Pretty Girl (EP) =

EP by Kara
- Released: December 4, 2008
- Recorded: 2008
- Genre: K-pop; dance-pop
- Length: 17:41
- Label: DSP

Kara chronology
Rock U (2008)	Pretty Girl (2008)	Revolution (2009)

Singles from Pretty Girl
- 1. "Pretty Girl" Released: December 4, 2008

Honey (Special Edition)

Singles from Honey (Special Edition)
- 1. "Honey" Released: February 12, 2009

Pretty Girl is the second extended play by South Korean girl group Kara. It was released on December 4, 2008. A song with the same name was released as the title track to promote the album. The title track is a lively and upbeat track that showcases the group's catchy melodies and energetic choreography. A repackage of the EP, titled Honey (Special Edition), was released on February 12, 2009, and spawned the single "Honey".

== Background and release ==
It was announced in late November that Kara would be releasing a second mini-album, two months after "Rock U", with a fun "party" concept. Following the release of the song and the enthusiastic response it garnered, the group's name rose to the top of search results on numerous Korean portal websites, further boosting the girls' fame in South Korea.

In addition, the song also charted high on various websites and digital music retailers, which allowed the group to rival some of South Korea's top girl groups such as Wonder Girls, Girls' Generation, and the Brown Eyed Girls. The group's leader, Park Gyu-ri, attributed Kara's rise in popularity to their natural but pretty appeal, while national newspaper Sports Seoul attributed it to the fact that the band finally found their own identity.

=== Repackage ===
A repackaged mini-album edition of the Pretty Girl EP was released on February 12, 2009. The new EP features "Honey", various remixes of "Pretty Girl", and a remix "Good Day Season 2", a song that was initially only given a digital release. Kara filmed the music video for "Honey" on February 10. The music video was to be released on February 17 but was moved up a day to February 16. The music video features the girls in angelic dresses sitting at home.

In contrast to "Pretty Girl"'s cute and lively concept, the title track "Honey" is more wistful and features the members of Kara as soft, feminine women. The song was remixed from the original version, and also underwent a slight name change from "하니" (Ha-ni) to "Honey". It is considered the group's first hit.

== Commercial performance ==
The Gaon Music Chart was launched in February 2010 as the official chart for South Korea. Pretty Girl entered at number 76 on the Gaon Album Chart for the second week of 2010 and peaked at number 23 for the week ending November 27, 2010.

The repackage entered at number 84 on the Gaon Album Chart for the second week of 2010 and peaked at number 2 on the week ending April 17, 2010. It spent three non-consecutive weeks in the top 10 in 2010 and became their second top 5 album as well as their third top 10 album. Kara member Han Seung-yeon noted that the title track "Honey" climbed the charts much faster than "Pretty Girl" did, while Goo Hara stated that the song appealed to an older age group.

== Music video ==
On November 29, 2008, DSP Entertainment released a teaser video for "Pretty Girl", which received over 40,000 hits in one day. The full video was released on December 2, 2008, online and was positively received by the public.

== Promotion ==
The group began its comeback on all major music shows on December 4, 2008, the single's release date, starting with M.Net Countdown. During their first national performance on KBS's Music Bank, member Goo Ha Ra forgot part of the choreography and cried for an hour backstage.

During Kara's December 14, 2008, performance on Inkigayo, the fans decided to cheer with pink rubber gloves, which positively surprised viewers; even the group was surprised, as member Han Seung-yeon wrote on her blog that she almost died of laughter. "Pretty Girl" is featured in the international arcade music game, DJ Max Technika 3. The group debuted "Honey" on Music Bank program on February 13, 2009.

== Accolades ==
Music program awards
Song	Program	Date	Ref.
"Honey"	M Countdown	March 5, 2009	
"Honey"	M Countdown	March 12, 2009	
"Honey"	M Countdown	March 26, 2009	
"Honey"	Inkigayo	March 8, 2009	

== Track listing ==
Pretty Girl track listing
No.	Title	Lyrics	Music	Arrangement	Length
1.	"Honey" (하니)	Han Jae-ho; Kim Seung-soo; Song Su-yun	Han Jae-ho; Kim Seung-soo	Han Jae-ho; Kim Seung-soo	3:41
2.	"Pretty Girl"	Han Jae-ho; Kim Seung-soo; Song Su-yun	Han Jae-ho; Kim Seung-soo	Han Jae-ho; Kim Seung-soo	3:29
3.	"Yodel" (요를레이)	E-Tribe	E-Tribe	E-Tribe	3:39
4.	"My Darling"	Kim Boa	MonoTree	MonoTree	3:10
5.	"I'm... (Ing)" (나는.. (Ing))	MonoTree; Kim Boa	MonoTree; Kim Boa	MonoTree	3:42
Total length:					17:41

Honey (Special Edition) track listing
No.	Title	Lyrics	Music	Arrangement	Length
1.	"Honey"	Han Jae-ho; Kim Seung-soo; Song Su-yun	Han Jae-ho; Kim Seung-soo	Han Jae-ho; Kim Seung-soo; PLASTICROOM	3:15
2.	"What Is This?" (이게 뭐야; Plastic Ver.)	Han Jae-ho; Song Su-yun	Han Jae-ho; Kim Seung-soo	PLASTICROOM	3:04
3.	"Pretty Girl" (Bani Ver.)	Han Jae-ho; Kim Seung-soo; Song Su-yun	Han Jae-ho; Kim Seung-soo	Han Jae-ho; Kim Seung-soo	2:47
4.	"Good Day" (굿데이; Season 2)	Han Jae-ho; Kim Seung-soo	Han Jae-ho; Kim Seung-soo	Han Jae-ho; Kim Seung-soo	3:13
5.	"Pretty Girl" (School Rock Ver.)	Han Jae-ho; Kim Seung-soo; Song Su-yun	Han Jae-ho; Kim Seung-soo	Han Jae-ho; Kim Seung-soo	3:30
6.	"Honey" (Ver. 2)	Han Jae-ho; Kim Seung-soo; Song Su-yun	Han Jae-ho; Kim Seung-soo	Han Jae-ho; Kim Seung-soo	3:13
Total length:					19:02

== Charts ==
=== Weekly charts ===
Chart (2010)	Peak position
South Korean Albums (Gaon)	23
South Korean Albums (Gaon) Pretty Girl Special Edition	2

=== Year-end charts ===
Chart (2010)	Peak position
South Korean Albums (Gaon) Pretty Girl Special Edition	94
