= Karasia =

Series of concert tours by Kara

- Tour by Kara
- Associated album: Various
- Start date: February 18, 2012
- End date: August 3, 2025
- Legs: 6
- No. of shows: 60

Karasia are a series of concert tours by South Korean girl group Kara. The Karasia 1st Tour began in Seoul at the Olympic Gymnastics Arena in February 2012 and concluded at the Tokyo Dome in January 2013, marking the first time a female South Korean artist held a concert at the venue. The Karasia 2nd Japan Tour commenced in October 2013, which drew 120,000 people across 14 shows.

The third and fourth legs of Karasia took place in 2014 and 2015, and the group reunited for the Karasia 5th Japan Tour in August 2024. The sixth leg, titled Magical World, took place in 2025.

== Background ==
The first concert tour titled Karasia began in Seoul, South Korea in February 2012, and continued with 12 shows in Japan starting in Yokohama in April. The tour was also planned to have dates in China, Hong Kong, Taiwan, Thailand, Singapore, Indonesia and others, but this never came to fruition.

The 2012 tour concluded in Saitama on May 27, 2012, and attracted around 150,000 people in Japan. The last concert was broadcast live through streaming in 60 different theaters throughout Japan, and all the tickets to the theaters were sold out as well. All solo songs that the girls performed in the Japanese tour was released on the album Kara Collection on September 5, 2012. On January 6, 2013, the group held a special concert at the Tokyo Dome in front of 45,000 people, making them the first female South Korean artist to hold a concert at the venue.

A second tour, also titled Karasia, started in Japan on October 8, 2013. The tour attracted 120,000 people and was the last with members Nicole and Jiyoung prior to their departures from the group in January 2014. The group then embarked on their third Japanese tour on October 24, 2014, their first with new member Youngji. A fourth Karasia Japanese tour took place in September 2015 and was the group's final tour before their disbandment in January 2016. Kara's four concert tours in South Korea and Japan attracted a total of over 420,000 people.

== Set lists ==
Seoul, South Korea (2012)
1. "Step"
2. "Wanna"
3. "Jumping"
4. "Secretly Secretly" (몰래몰래)
5. "Umbrella"
6. "Binks"
7. "Date (My Boy)"
8. "With"
9. "I'm..(Ing)" (나는..(Ing))
10. "Wait"
11. Tango Dance + "Day Dream" (Park Gyuri's solo)
12. "Superstar" (Han Seung-yeon's solo)
13. "Beat It" (Nicole Jung's solo, Michael Jackson cover)
14. "Secret Love" (Goo Ha-ra's solo)
15. "Lupin"
16. "Let It Go"
17. "Break It"
18. "Umbrella" + "Wanna Do" (Kang Jiyoung's solo, Acoustic Ver)
19. "Guilty" (Han Seung-yeon's solo)
20. "Love" + Sport Dance (Goo Ha-ra's solo)
21. "Lost" (Nicole Jung's solo)
22. "Maria" (Park Gyuri's solo)
23. "Superman" (Norazo cover)
24. "Lonely"
25. "Winter Magic"
26. "Honey"
27. "Jet Coaster Love"
28. "With My Heart (Dear Kamilia)" (내 마음을 담아서 (Dear Kamilia))
29. "My Darling"
30. "Mister"

Encore:

31. "Pretty Girl"
32. "Girls Be Ambitious"
33. "Rock U"

Notes:

- A-Jax's leader, Hyeongkon, performed on Nicole's solo song "Lost", dubling the voice of 2AM's Jin-woon, who originally make a featuring in the song.
Japan (2012)
1. "Speed Up"
2. "Jumping"
3. "Dreaming Girl"
4. "Umbrella" (Japanese version)
5. "Girl's Power"
6. "Pretty Girl"
7. "Lost" + "The Game of Love" / "Beat It"* (Nicole Jung's solo)
8. "Kara Medley ("Umbrella", "Whisper" and "Mister") + "Wanna Do" (Kang Ji-young's solo)
9. "Secret Love" (Goo Ha-ra's solo)
10. Tango Dance + "Daydream" (Park Gyuri's solo)
11. "Guilty" (Han Seung-yeon's solo)
12. "Lupin"
13. "Step"
14. "Let it Go"
15. "Honey"
16. "Winter Magic"
17. "Missing"
18. "Ima, Okuritai 'Arigatō'"
19. "Go Go Summer!"
20. "Jet Coaster Love"
21. "Mister"

Encore:

22. "Girls Be Ambitious"
23. "SOS"
24. "Rock U"

Notes:

- Due to Nicole's leg injury, she performed "The Game of Love" instead of "Beat It". In their show in Saitama, "Beat It" was performed replacing "The Game of Love".
- A-Jax performed as opening act in the last two shows.
Japan - Happy New Year in Tokyo Dome (2013)
1. "Pandora"
2. "Speed Up"
3. "Jumping"
4. "Dreaming Girl"
5. "Honey" (Metal version) (Cyntia's guest performance)
6. Drum solo + "I Love Rock 'n' Roll" (Goo Ha-ra's solo)
7. "Strong Enough" (Han Seung-yeon's solo)
8. "Girl's Power"
9. "Kiss Me Tonight"
10. "Pretty Girl"
11. "Winter Magic"
12. "Orion"
13. "Ima, Okuritai 'Arigatō'"
14. "Humpin' Around" (Nicole Jung's solo)
15. "Daydream" (Remix) (Park Gyuri's solo)
16. "Gakuen Tengoku" (Kang Ji-young's solo)
17. "Lupin"
18. "Step"
19. "Let it Go"
20. "Electric Boy"
21. "Go Go Summer!"
22. "Jet Coaster Love"
23. "Rock U"

Encore:

24. "Girls Be Ambitious"
25. "SOS"
26. "Mister"

Notes:

- The Japanese girl rock band Cyntia played a metal version of "Honey" as a special guest performance, as well they were the band on Hara's solo performance.
- As opening for Seung-yeon's solo performance, it was shown, in a VTR, pictures of her since Kara's debut until today, as well baby photos of her.
- As opening for Gyuri's solo performance, she performed a special ballet from Swan Lake.
- As opening for Nicole's solo performance, a VTR of her being a DJ and dancing a song was shown.
- As opening for Jiyoung's solo performance, a VTR of some students in a Japanese school praising a photo of her in Girls Forever's album booklet, then call them to go to Tokyo Dome. The band Cyntia played on her performance.
- A preview of the group's first TV anime Kara The Animation aired before the performance of "Mister".
Japan (2013)
1. "Lupin"
2. "Jumping"
3. "Pandora"
4. "Damaged Lady"
5. "2Night"
6. "Geuriun Naren (Miss U)"
7. "Pretty Girl"
8. "We Will Rock You" (Queen cover) (Han Seung-yeon's solo)
9. "Anata ga Iru Kara" (Mika Nakashima cover) (Park Gyuri's solo)
10. "We Found Love" (Rihanna cover) (Nicole Jung's solo)
11. "Glamorous Sky" (Mika Nakashima cover) (Goo Ha-ra's solo)
12. "Hideki Saijyo" (Village People Japanese cover) (Kang Ji-young's solo)
13. "Winter Magic"
14. "Hanabi"
15. "Dul Junge Hana (Runaway)"
16. "Bye Bye Happy Days!"
17. "Girl's Power"
18. "My Boy"
19. "Thank You Summer Love"
20. "Go Go Summer!"
21. "Jet Coaster Love"

Encore:

22. "Mister"
23. "Sweet Days"
24. "Ima, Okuritai 'Arigatō'"
25. "Step"
Japan (2014)
1. "Mamma Mia! (Japanese Version)"
2. "Pandora"
3. "Lupin"
4. "Happy Happy Love"
5. "So Good"
6. "Rescue Me"
7. "天使のウィンク (Tenshi no Wink)" (Seiko Matsuda cover) (Heo Young-ji)
8. "Love the Way You Lie (Part II) / Dirrty" (Rihanna/Christina Aguilera cover) (Han Seung-yeon)
9. "みんな空の下 (Minna Sora no Shita)" (Ayaka cover) (Goo Ha-ra)
10. "Hush Hush" (The Pussycat Dolls cover) (Park Gyuri)
11. "Pretty Girl"
12. "Jet Coaster Love"
13. "Girl's Power"
14. "Rock U"
15. "Good-bye days" (Yui cover) (Park Gyuri & Han Seung-yeon)
16. "Crazy in Love" (Beyoncé cover) (Goo Ha-ra & Heo Young-ji)
17. "一番にわたしを抱きしめて (Ichiban ni Watashi o Dakishimete)"
18. "French Kiss"
19. "Promise"
20. "Pop Star"
21. "Mister"

Encore:

22. "Go Go Summer!"
23. "SOS"
24. "Step"

Notes:

- Park Gyuri performed Juju's "明日がくるなら (Ashita ga Kuru Nara)" as her solo performance in Okayama.
Japan (2015)
1. "Thank You Summer Love"
2. "Girl's Power"
3. "Cupid"
4. "Whisper"
5. "Dreaming Girl"
6. "Mamma Mia! (Japanese Version)"
7. "I LOVE YOU" (Yutaka Ozaki cover) (Han Seung-yeon)
8. "なんてったってアイドル (Nantettatte Aidoru)" (Kyōko Koizumi cover) (Heo Young-ji)
9. "SAKURA" (Ikimono-gakari cover) (Park Gyuri)
10. "Choco Chip Cookies" (Goo Ha-ra)
11. "HANABI"
12. "Last Summer"
13. "Endless Night"
14. "Summer☆gic"
15. "Honey"
16. "N.E.V.E.R.L.A.N.D."
17. "Sunshine Miracle"
18. "Go Go Summer!"
19. "Pretty Girl"
20. "Jet Coaster Love"
21. "Mister"

Encore:

22. "Bye Bye Happy Days!"
23. "Step"
24. "Rock U"

Notes:

- Park Gyuri performed X Japan's "Endless Rain" as her solo performance in Nagoya.
Japan (2024)
1. "When I Move" (Japanese version)
2. "Lupin"
3. "Pandora"
4. "Queens"
5. "Honey"
6. "Pretty Girl"
7. "Jet Coaster Love"
8. "Summer☆gic"
9. "Sunshine Miracle"
10. "Go Go Summer!"
11. "L.O.V.E." (Heo Young-ji)
12. "Suki na Hito ga Iru Koto" (Kang Ji-young)
13. "Daydream" (Park Gyu-ri)
14. "Guilty" (Han Seung-yeon)
15. "5!6!7!8!" (Nicole Jung)
16. "Hanabi"
17. "Last Summer"
18. "Hello"
19. "I Do I Do" (Japanese version)
20. "Mamma Mia!" (Japanese version)
21. "Mister" (Japanese version)
22. "Happy Hour"

Encore:

23. "SOS"
24. "Rock U"
25. "Step"
Japan (2025)
1. "Mamma Mia!" (Japanese version)
2. "Lupin"
3. "Damaged Lady"
4. "Jumping" (Japanese version)
5. "Cupid"
6. "Honey"
7. "Pretty Girl"
8. "Jet Coaster Love"
9. "I Do I Do" (Japanese version)
10. "N.E.V.E.R.L.A.N.D." / "Thank You Summer Love" / "Summer☆gic"
11. "Go Go Summer!"
12. "Makenaide" (ZARD cover) (Park Gyu-ri)
13. "Gravity" (Nicole Jung)
14. "Idol" (Yoasobi cover) (Han Seung-yeon)
15. "Hai Yorokonde" (Kocchi no Kento cover) (Kang Ji-young and Heo Young-ji)
16. "Apt." (Rosé and Bruno Mars cover) (Kang Ji-young and Heo Young-ji)
17. "Runaway"
18. "Ima, Okuritai 'Arigatō"
19. "Oxygen"
20. "When I Move" (Japanese version)
21. "Step"
22. "Mister" (Japanese version)

Encore:

23. "Girls Be Ambitious!"
24. "Rock U"

Notes:

- Park Gyuri performed Nana starring Mika Nakashima's "Glamorous Sky" as her solo performance from the second Yokohama show onwards.

== Tour dates ==
=== Karasia 1st Tour ===
Tour dates
Date	City	Country	Venue	Attendance
February 18, 2012	Seoul	South Korea	Olympic Gymnastics Arena	18,000
February 19, 2012	Seoul	South Korea	Olympic Gymnastics Arena	18,000
April 14, 2012	Yokohama	Japan	Yokohama Arena	150,000
April 15, 2012	Yokohama	Japan	Yokohama Arena	150,000
April 18, 2012	Nagoya	Japan	Nippon Gaishi Hall	150,000
April 19, 2012	Nagoya	Japan	Nippon Gaishi Hall	150,000
April 27, 2012	Osaka	Japan	Osaka-jō Hall	150,000
April 28, 2012	Osaka	Japan	Osaka-jō Hall	150,000
April 30, 2012	Fukuoka	Japan	Marine Messe Fukuoka	150,000
May 1, 2012	Fukuoka	Japan	Marine Messe Fukuoka	150,000
May 16, 2012	Tokyo	Japan	Yoyogi National Gymnasium	150,000
May 17, 2012	Tokyo	Japan	Yoyogi National Gymnasium	150,000
May 26, 2012	Saitama	Japan	Saitama Super Arena	150,000
May 27, 2012	Saitama	Japan	Saitama Super Arena	150,000
January 6, 2013	Tokyo	Japan	Tokyo Dome	48,000
Total				216,000

=== Karasia 2nd Japan Tour ===
Tour dates
Date	City	Country	Venue	Attendance
October 8, 2013	Yokohama	Japan	Yokohama Arena	120,000
October 9, 2013	Yokohama	Japan	Yokohama Arena	120,000
October 16, 2013	Fukuoka	Japan	Marine Messe Fukuoka	120,000
October 17, 2013	Fukuoka	Japan	Marine Messe Fukuoka	120,000
October 23, 2013	Osaka	Japan	Osaka-jō Hall	120,000
October 24, 2013	Osaka	Japan	Osaka-jō Hall	120,000
October 29, 2013	Nagoya	Japan	Nippon Gaishi Hall	120,000
October 30, 2013	Nagoya	Japan	Nippon Gaishi Hall	120,000
November 9, 2013	Fukui	Japan	Sun Dome Fukui	120,000
November 10, 2013	Fukui	Japan	Sun Dome Fukui	120,000
November 19, 2013	Saitama	Japan	Saitama Super Arena	120,000
November 20, 2013	Saitama	Japan	Saitama Super Arena	120,000
November 23, 2013	Kobe	Japan	World Memorial Hall	120,000
November 24, 2013	Kobe	Japan	World Memorial Hall	120,000

=== Karasia 3rd Japan Tour ===
Tour dates
Date	City	Country	Venue	Attendance
October 24, 2014	Fukuoka	Japan	Fukuoka Sunpalace	55,000
October 25, 2014	Fukuoka	Japan	Fukuoka Sunpalace	55,000
October 27, 2014	Nagoya	Japan	Nagoya Congress Center	55,000
November 3, 2014	Okayama	Japan	Okayama Civic Hall	55,000
November 5, 2014	Kanazawa	Japan	Honda Forest Hall	55,000
November 6, 2014	Niigata	Japan	Niigata Prefectural Civic Center	55,000
November 14, 2014	Osaka	Japan	Osaka Municipal Central Gymnasium	55,000
November 15, 2014	Osaka	Japan	Osaka Municipal Central Gymnasium	55,000
November 18, 2014	Yokohama	Japan	Yokohama Arena	55,000
November 19, 2014	Yokohama	Japan	Yokohama Arena	55,000

=== Karasia 4th Japan Tour ===
Tour dates
Date	City	Country	Venue	Attendance
September 1, 2015	Osaka	Japan	Zepp Namba	35,000
September 2, 2015	Osaka	Japan	Zepp Namba	35,000
September 3, 2015	Osaka	Japan	Zepp Namba	35,000
September 4, 2015	Nagoya	Japan	Nagoya Congress Center	35,000
September 8, 2015	Kanazawa	Japan	Honda Forest Hall	35,000
September 10, 2015	Hiroshima	Japan	Hiroshima Art and Culture Hall	35,000
September 12, 2015	Okayama	Japan	Okayama Civic Hall	35,000
September 21, 2015	Fukuoka	Japan	Zepp Fukuoka	35,000
September 22, 2015	Fukuoka	Japan	Zepp Fukuoka	35,000
September 24, 2015	Yokohama	Japan	Pacifico Yokohama	35,000
September 25, 2015	Yokohama	Japan	Pacifico Yokohama	35,000
September 28, 2015	Yokohama	Japan	Pacifico Yokohama	35,000
September 29, 2015	Yokohama	Japan	Pacifico Yokohama	35,000

=== Karasia 5th Japan Tour ===
Tour dates
Date	City	Country	Venue	Attendance
August 17, 2024	Funabashi	Japan	LaLa Arena Tokyo-Bay	—
August 18, 2024	Funabashi	Japan	LaLa Arena Tokyo-Bay	—
August 24, 2024	Osaka	Japan	Asue Arena Osaka	—
August 25, 2024	Osaka	Japan	Asue Arena Osaka	—

=== Karasia 6th Japan Tour: Magical World ===
Tour dates
Date	City	Country	Venue	Attendance
July 5, 2025	Yokohama	Japan	Pia Arena MM	—
July 6, 2025	Yokohama	Japan	Pia Arena MM	—
August 2, 2025	Kobe	Japan	Glion Arena Kobe	—
August 3, 2025	Kobe	Japan	Glion Arena Kobe	—

=== Karasia: The Phoenix Tour ===
Tour dates
Date	City	Country	Venue	Attendance
August 30, 2025	Macau		Studio City Event Centre	—

== DVD ==
=== Japanese version ===
Kara 1st Japan Tour Karasia

Video by Kara
- Released: November 14, 2012
- Recorded: 2012
- Genres: K-pop, J-pop
- Label: Universal Sigma

Kara chronology
Kara Best Clips II & Shows (2012)	Kara 1st Japan Tour Karasia (2012)	2012 Karasia Seoul Concert (2012)

Kara 1st Japan Tour Karasia is the second live DVD of the South Korean girl group Kara. It was released on November 14, 2012, in 2 formats: DVD and Blu-ray and 2 different editions: Limited edition (2 discs) and Regular edition (1 disc). The DVD was scheduled to be released on October 17 along with the group's seventh Japanese single "Electric Boy" but it was postponed to November 14, 2012, due to an error found in one of the discs. The DVD was released along with the group's third Japanese album Girls Forever.

Track listing

Disc 1: Live DVD
No.	Title	Length
1.	"Speed Up" (スピード アップ)
2.	"Jumping" (ジャンピン) (Japanese version)
3.	"Dreamin' Girl" (ドリーミンガール)
4.	"Umbrella" (アンブレラ) (Japanese version)
5.	"Girl's Power" (ガールズ パワー)
6.	"Pretty Girl"
7.	"Lost" (Nicole solo) (Korean version)
8.	"Kara Medley ("Umbrella", "Whisper" and "Mister") / Wanna Do" (Ji-young solo) (Korean version)
9.	"L-O-V-E / Secret Love" (Ha-ra solo) (Korean version)
10.	"Daydream" (Gyu-ri solo) (Korean version)
11.	"Guilty" (Seung-yeon solo) (Korean version)
12.	"Lupin"
13.	"Step"
14.	"Let It Go"
15.	"Honey"
16.	"Winter Magic" (ウィンターマジック)
17.	"Missing" (ミッシング)
18.	"Ima, Okuritai 'Arigatō'" (今、贈りたい「ありがとう」)
19.	"Go Go Summer!" (GO GO サマー!)
20.	"Jet Coaster Love" (ジェットコースターラブ)
21.	"Mister" (ミスター) (Japanese version)
22.	"Girls Be Ambitious!" (ガールズ ビー アンビシャス!) (Encore)
23.	"SOS" (Encore)
24.	"Rock U" (Encore)

Disc 2: Bonus disc (Limited edition only)
No.	Title	Length
1.	"Making-of Special movie" (スペシャル・メイキング・フィルム)

Charts

Chart	Peak position
Oricon Weekly DVD chart	1
Oricon Weekly Blu-ray chart	1
Oricon Yearly DVD chart	48
Oricon Yearly Blu-ray chart	25

Sales and certifications

Chart	Amount
Oricon physical sales	60,008+

Release history

Country	Date	Format	Label
Japan	November 14, 2012	DVD, Blu-ray Disc	Universal Sigma

=== Korean version ===
2012 Karasia Seoul Concert

Video by Kara
- Released: December 26, 2012
- Recorded: February 18–19, 2012
- Genre: K-pop
- Label: Universal Sigma

Kara chronology
Kara 1st Japan Tour Karasia (2012)	2012 Karasia Seoul Concert (2012)	Karasia 2013 Happy New Year in Tokyo Dome (2013)

2012 Karasia Seoul Concert is the third live DVD of the South Korean girl group Kara. It was released on December 26, 2012, only in DVD format. The DVD contains the first Korean concert of the group held in the Olympic Gymnastics Arena in Seoul, South Korea, during February 18 and 19, 2012.

Track listing

Disc 1
No.	Title	Length
1.	"Opening"
2.	"Step"
3.	"Wanna"
4.	"Jumping"
5.	"Ment 1"
6.	"Secretly Secretly"
7.	"Before the Date" (VTR 1)
8.	"Umbrella"
9.	"Binks"
10.	"Date (My Boy)"
11.	"With"
12.	"MENT 2"
13.	"I'm... (Ing)"
14.	"Wait"
15.	"Shooting time of Kara" (VTR 2)
16.	"Tango + Daydream" (Gyuri solo)
17.	"Secret Love" (Hara solo)
18.	"Mysterious Lupin" (VTR 3)
19.	"Lupin"
20.	"Let It Go"
21.	"History of Kara" (VTR 4)
22.	"Kara Medley ("Umbrella", "What's This?", "Good Day") + Wanna Do" (Jiyoung solo)
23.	"Guilty" (Seung-yeon solo)
24.	"L-O-V-E + ChaChaCha" (Hara solo)
25.	"Lost" (Nicole solo)
26.	"Maria" (Gyuri solo)
27.	"Super Girl"

Disc 2
No.	Title	Length
1.	"Love Is" (VTR 5)
2.	"Lonely"
3.	"Winter Magic"
4.	"Honey"
5.	"Jet Coaster Love"
6.	"Ment 3"
7.	"With My Heart (Dear Kamilia)"
8.	"My Darling"
9.	"Rehearsal" (VTR 6)
10.	"Mister"
11.	"Kara Animation" (VTR 7)
12.	"Pretty Girl"
13.	"Girls Be Ambitious!"
14.	"Rock U"

Disc 3
No.	Title	Length
1.	"Special making" (off-shot movie)

Charts

Chart	Peak position
Oricon Weekly DVD chart	7

Sales and certifications

Chart	Amount
Oricon physical sales	9,830+

Release history

Country	Date	Format	Label
Japan	December 26, 2012	DVD	Universal Sigma

=== Tokyo Dome version ===
Karasia 2013 Happy New Year in Tokyo Dome

Video by Kara
- Released: March 27, 2013
- Recorded: January 6, 2013
- Genres: K-pop, J-pop
- Label: Universal Sigma

Kara chronology
2012 Karasia Seoul Concert (2012)	Karasia 2013 Happy New Year in Tokyo Dome (2013)

Karasia 2013 Happy New Year in Tokyo Dome is the eighth DVD, third Blu-ray and fourth live released by KARA. It was released in 2 formats (DVD and Blu-ray) and 2 editions: Limited and Regular. The limited editions includes a bonus disc with making of, rehearsals and an off-shot movie of the concert. The DVD includes their concert on Tokyo Dome, realized on January 6, 2013.

Track listing

Disc 1
No.	Title	Length
1.	"Pandora"
2.	"Speed Up" (スピード アップ)
3.	"Jumping" (ジャンピン)
4.	"Dreamin' Girl" (ドリーミンガール)
5.	"Honey" ((performed by Cyntia))
6.	"I Love Rock 'n' Roll" (Hara solo)
7.	"Strong Enough (ストロング・イナフ)" (Seung-yeon solo)
8.	"Girl's Power" (ガールズ パワー)
9.	"Pretty Girl"
10.	"Winter Magic" (ウィンターマジック)
11.	"Orion" (オリオン)
12.	"Ima, Okuritai 'Arigatō'" (今、贈りたい「ありがとう」)
13.	"Humpin' Around" (Nicole solo)
14.	"Swan Lake + Daydream" (Gyuri solo)
15.	"School Heaven (学園天国)" (Jiyoung solo)
16.	"Lupin"
17.	"Step"
18.	"Let It Go"
19.	"Electric Boy" (エレクトリックボーイ)
20.	"Go Go Summer!" (GO GO サマー)
21.	"Jet Coaster Love" (ジェットコースターラブ)
22.	"Rock U"
23.	"Girls Be Ambitious!" (ガールズ ビー アンビシャス!)
24.	"SOS"
25.	"Mister" (ミスター)

Disc 2
No.	Title	Length
1.	"Tojitsu no Butaiura ni Kanzen Mitchaku Shita Off-shot Eizo" (当日の舞台裏に完全密着したオフショット映像)

Charts

Chart	Peak position
Oricon Weekly DVD chart	4
Oricon Weekly Blu-ray chart	3

Sales and certifications

Chart	Amount
Oricon physical sales	32,552+

Release history

Country	Date	Format	Label
Japan	March 27, 2013	DVD, Blu-ray	Universal Sigma
