= Girls Forever =

- Version C cover. From left to right : Jiyoung, Nicole, Gyuri, Seungyeon and Hara.

Studio album by Kara
- Released: November 14, 2012
- Recorded: 2012
- Genre: J-pop; dance-pop
- Length: 38:40; 56:51 (with bonus tracks)
- Language: Japanese
- Label: Universal Sigma

Kara chronology
Kara Collection (2012)	Girls Forever (2012)	Kara Solo Collection (2012)

Singles from Girls Forever
- 1. "Speed Up" / "Girl's Power" Released: March 21, 2012; 2. "Electric Boy" Released: October 17, 2012

Girls Forever (ガールズ フォーエバー, Gāruzu Fōebā) is the third Japanese studio album and sixth overall studio album release by South Korean girl group Kara on November 14, 2012, in four different editions.

== Background ==
The album was announced by the group's Korean agency, DSP Media, on October 8, on Kara's official Japanese website with prices and first details about the release. It will be released in four editions: 3 limited editions, CD+DVD, CD+Photobook (28-pages) and a CD-Only First Press, plus a regular edition: CD-Only Normal Press. Every edition will come with a different jacket cover and different contests: the CD+DVD edition will come with the white jacket cover, a CD+Photobook with the black jacket cover, and both first and normal press CD only editions come with the grey jacket cover, including only the CD itself. All limited editions comes with five bonus tracks, 2012 versions of the songs "Jet Coaster Love", "Go Go Summer!" and "Winter Magic" and remastered versions of the songs "Mister" and "Jumping".

The album was also released in a special Deluxe edition on the Japanese iTunes Store, including the music videos of "Speed Up", "Girl's Power" and "Electric Boy". All limited editions comes with a special ticket to buy a special gift: limited A (CD+DVD edition) comes with a lottery ticket for their Tokyo Dome performance in 2013, limited B (CD+Photobook) comes with a special ticket for a special DVD with solo versions from the music video of "Electric Boy", one out of five different types. The buyer can choose one by ticket, pricing ¥2,000 every DVD. Limited C (CD only) comes with a special signed poster, one out of five different types. All editions will come with a lyric booklet.

== Composition ==
The album is composed by fifteen tracks in total, ten tracks and five bonus tracks. The song "Speed Up" was written by Emyli and composed by Mohombi Moupondo, Ivar Linsinski, Ninos Hanna and Robert Hanna. Mohombi Moupondo is known for composing the song "Gara Gara Go!", of the group BIGBANG. "Girl's Power" was written by PA-NON and composed by Han Sang-won. "Electric Boy" was written by Line Krogholm, Shalamon Baskin, Mikko Tamminen, Faya and Emyli, who also composed the song (with exception of Faya and Emyli). "Orion" was written and composed by Simon Isogai, same composer and writer of the songs "Winter Magic" and "Ima, Okuritai 'Arigatō'". The bonus tracks are alternative and remix versions of the group's first five singles released: "Mister", "Jumpin'", from the group's debut Japanese album Girl's Talk, "Jet Coaster Love", "Go Go Summer!" and "Winter Magic", from the group's second Japanese album Super Girl. The 2012 version of "Go Go Summer!" was first released as a digital single on July 25, 2012 and later added on the album Kara Collection, released on September 5, 2012.

== Singles ==
Three songs from the album were released as singles. The first single is the double A-side single "Speed Up / Girl's Power", released on March 21, 2012. It is the first double A-side single of the group. The physical single ranked number two in Oricon's weekly singles chart with 99,236 copies sold in the first week, number two on Billboard Japan's Hot Singles sales and also ranked number five on the chart with the Limited Type B edition "Girl's Power / Speed Up". At the date, the single sold almost 159,000 copies and was certified Gold by RIAJ for the shipment of 100,000 copies of the single.

The second and final single of the album is the song "Electric Boy", released on October 17, 2012. The physical single debuted at number one in Oricon's daily singles chart with 28,604 copies sold on the first day and ranked second on the weekly chart, with 59,237 copies sold in the first week. It also ranked number one on Billboard Japan's Hot 100, being the first number one single of the group on the chart. The B-side, "Orion", was also included on the album. As of October, the single was certified Gold by RIAJ for the shipment of 100,000 copies.

== Commercial performance ==
The album debuted at number two on Oricon's daily chart with 28,724 copies sold on the first day. In its third day of release, the album charted at number one with 7,206 copies sold. It was the 66th best-selling album of 2012 in Japan, selling over 101,000 copies according to Oricon.

== Track listing ==
All editions track listing
No.	Title	Lyrics	Music	Length
1.	"Speed Up (スピード アップ)"	Emyli	Mohombi, Ivar Lisinski, Ninos Hanna, Robert Hanna	3:21
2.	"Electric Boy (エレクトリックボーイ)"	Line Krogholm, Shalamon Baskin, Mikko Tamminen, Faya, Emyli	Line Krogholm, Shalamon Baskin	3:22
3.	"Gimme Gimme (ギミー ギミー)"	Natsumi Watanabe, Emyli	Emyli, Kohei Yokono, ArmySlick	4:12
4.	"Shake It Up (シェイク イット アップ)"	Reed Vertelney, Lindy Robbins, Litz	Reed Vertelney, Lindy Robbins, Litz	3:49
5.	"Kiss Me Tonight (キス ミー トゥナイト)"	Kenn Kato	Kim Jin-hwan	3:59
6.	"Orion (オリオン)"	Simon Isogai	Simon Isogai	5:36
7.	"Oops!"	Shihomi	Doublekick	4:00
8.	"Rock On (ロックオン)"	Ivar Lisinski, Robert Hanna, Ninos Hanna, Yui Kimura	Ivar Lisinski, Robert Hanna, Ninos Hanna, Yui Kimura	3:31
9.	"Innocent Girl (イノセントガール)"	Yu Shimoji, Emyli (Rap making)	SeoGy, Genie (Digz, inc)	2:58
10.	"Girl's Power (ガールズ パワー)"	PA-NON	Han Sang-won	3:57
Total length:				38:40

Limited editions bonus tracks
No.	Title	Lyrics	Music	Length
11.	"Jet Coaster Love 2012 (ジェットコースターラブ 2012)"	Natsumi Watanabe, Yu Shimoji	Hwang Seong-je	3:39
12.	"Go Go Summer! 2012 (GO GO サマー! 2012)"	Yu Shimoji	Han Sang-won, Lee Sang-ho, Kimzart	3:23
13.	"Winter Magic 2012 (ウィンターマジック 2012)"	Simon Isogai	Simon Isogai	4:58
14.	"Jumping (ジャンピン)" (remastered)	Song Soo-yun, Natsumi Watanabe	Han Jae-ho, Kim Seung-soo	2:59
15.	"Mister (ミスター)" (remastered)	Song Soo-yun, Natsumi Watanabe, PA-NON	Han Jae-ho, Kim Seung-soo	3:13
Total length:				56:51

DVD (limited edition type A)
No.	Title	Length
1.	"Electric Boy" (music video – close-up version)
2.	"Speed Up" (music video – another version)
3.	"Girl's Power" (music video – close-up version)
4.	"CM collection" (CMコレクション)
5.	"1st Japan Tour Karasia VTR making video" (off-shot movie)
6.	"Girls Forever jacket shoot making" (off-shot movie)

iTunes Japan deluxe edition videos
No.	Title	Length
11.	"Speed Up" (music video)
12.	"Girl's Power" (music video)
13.	"Electric Boy" (music video)

== Charts ==
=== Weekly charts ===
Chart (2012)	Peak position
Japanese Albums (Oricon)	2
Japanese Top Albums (Billboard)	1

=== Year-end charts ===
Chart (2012)	Position
Japanese Albums (Oricon)	66
Japanese Top Albums (Billboard)	72

== Sales and certifications ==
Region	Certification	Certified units/sales
Japan (RIAJ)	Platinum	122,352

== Release history ==
Country	Date	Format	Label
Japan	November 14, 2012	CD, Digital download	Universal Sigma
Australia	November 14, 2012	Digital download	Universal Sigma
