= From the Airport =

South Korean indie duo

From The Airport
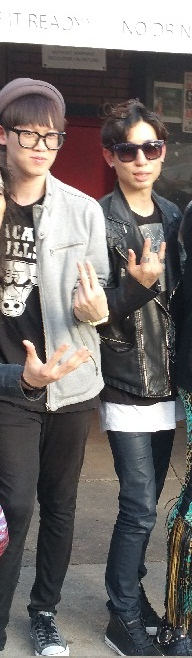
- Zee and Milo, Austin, Texas, March 2015

Background information
- Origin: Seoul, South Korea
- Genres: Indie rock, electronic rock
- Years active: 2012–present
- Label: Fluxus Music
- Members: Milo; Zee
- Website: fromtheairport.net

From The Airport (Korean: 프럼 디 에어포트) is a South Korean indie duo formed in 2012. The band consists of Milo and Zee.

== History ==
=== Formation ===
From The Airport came together in early 2012 when Milo (Producing, Guitar, Bass, Keys, Vocals) and Zee (Producing, DJ, Drums, Keys, Vocals) met at a friend's underground studio. They quickly realized they both had very similar musical taste and style and arranged to do a jam session for fun. During the session, the duo‟s natural chemistry led them to experiment and create the product of which was the foundation for their first track “Colors.”

Both Milo and Zee had experiences prior to teaming up. Milo’s guitar mastery were honed from film music production (Jesus Band, Korea, Shirano Agency), while Zee learned the keys and DJ/producing in composing for K-pop music scene (Banana Dynamite, MC Sniper, J). From The Airport's sound is notable for their mix of energizing distortions, upbeat dance beats, complex melodies, and lyrics.

After a while, the duo named the team 'From The Airport', with the meaning of amplifying musical messages to listeners around the world and to capture the starting point of emotions, which they deemed to be airports.

=== Debut Single ===
In October 2012, From The Airport released their debut single album, 'Colors,' with the title track of the same name. The track was mixed by From The Airport and mastered by Chris Athens at Chris Athens Masters.

From The Airport's first two singles, 'Colors' and 'Everyone's All Right,' was well received by the world media and audience. Garnering attention from UK media, The Guardian, From The Airport was named as one of the international bands of the Month February 2013. From The Airport's video for 'Colors' was instantly addictive with an electro-indie-rock mixture of music.

=== Rising Popularity from 'Timelines' ===
From The Airport returned with its third single track '"Timelines." The track was once again received well by the public, being able to bump Grammy award winners, Daft Punk, from the top spot on the US’s Indie Shuffle charts. From The Airport was reviewed by multiple publications from all around the world, and being compared to bands such as Two Door Cinema Club, Passion Pit and Strange Talk.

From The Airport was selected as May 2013's hidden artist of the month by Bugs Music, one of the top music distributors in South Korea.

=== Label ===
In June 2013, the high flying duo decided to take the next step and signed with Fluxus Music, a Korean music label that consists of Korea’s top pop/indie artists such as Clazziquai Project, Urban Zakapa, and Yi Sung Yol.

=== Major Debut ===
Leaving the basement studio for brighter skies, they created their first EP album, ‘Chemical Love’ which was released in February 2014 and shared a message of positivity and optimism for the lives and life around us. From The Airport released their first full-length Album, ‘You Could Imagine’ on January 9, 2015.

== Members ==
- Milo - guitars, bass, vocals, synthesizers, production
- Zee - DJing, vocals, synthesizers, drums, production

== Discography ==
=== Studio albums ===
Title	Album details
You Could Imagine	Released: January 9, 2015; Track listing: 1. The Airport; 2. Sight; 3. Golden; 4. Timelines; 5. The Queen (The Beast); 6. Enjoy The Flight; 7. Hit My Cash; 8. Colors; 9. Chemical Love; 10. Flying Walls; 11. Underwater
The Boy Who Jumped	Released: February 7, 2017; Track listing: 1. The Heartbeats; 2. Go Or Die; 3. Night And Day feat. Park Gyu-ri of KARA; 4. Emotion (감정); 5. The Jump; 6. Noise Control; 7. Age; 8. Wash Away; 9. Never Die

=== Extended plays ===
Title	Album details
Chemical Love	Released: February 6, 2014; Track listing: 1. Chemical Love; 2. Black Skies; 3. Timelines; 4. Raining; 5. Distinct Memories of the Common Boy

=== Single albums ===
Title	Album details
Colors	Released: October 9, 2012; Track listing: 1. Message; 2. Colors
Everyone's All Right	Released: January 14, 2013; Track listing: 1. Everyone's All Right; 2. Raining
Timelines	Released: April 8, 2013; Track listing: 1. Timelines
Black Skies	Released: November 7, 2013; Track listing: 1. Black Skies
Golden	Released: October 15, 2014; Track listing: 1. Golden; 2. The Queen (The Beast)
The Little Prince	Released: June 15, 2015; Track listing: 1. The Little Prince (어린왕자) with Park Gyu-ri of KARA; 2. Return with Park Gyu-ri of KARA
The Jump	Released: January 26, 2017; Track listing: 1. The Jump
