= Kara Collection =

2012 compilation album by Kara

- Regular edition cover

Compilation album by Kara
- Released: September 5, 2012
- Recorded: 2011–2012
- Genre: Dance-pop, pop rock, R&B, tango
- Length: 42:29
- Language: Japanese
- Label: Universal Sigma

Kara chronology
Pandora (2012)	Kara Collection (2012)	Girls Forever (2012)

Kara Collection (KARA コレクション, KARA Korekushon) (stylized as KARA Collection) is a compilation album by South Korean girl group Kara. It was first released in Japanese on September 5, 2012 in four different editions: two CD+DVD, a Regular edition and a digital Deluxe edition.

A Korean edition, titled as KARA Solo Collection, was released on November 30, 2012 digitally and December 4, 2012 physically. The songs were performed in Korean language.

== Japanese version ==
=== Background ===
On January 15, 2012, it was announced that each members of the group were planning on releasing their own solo material. However, these songs were instead included on the setlist for the Karasia tour.

On August 17 it was eventually announced on the group's official Japanese website that a solo collections album would be released which contained the songs. The album will be released in three different editions: two CD+DVD, Type A will include the CD, a DVD with music videos of all solo songs, behind the scenes of the music videos and a 28-page photobook, Type B will include the CD and a DVD with all music videos only, and a Regular edition with only the CD itself. CD+DVD Type A comes in a keep case, while CD+DVD B and Regular edition comes in a jewel case. Both CD+DVD editions will include a lottery ticket that comes with different goods that the girls used in their music videos: from Gyuri a hair accessories, from Hara an ice cream cone toy, from Nicole a yellow VHS tape, from Seung-yeon a book (that appears in the opening of the music video) and from Jiyoung a polaroid camera. The buyer can only choose one of them by ticket.

The solo songs were released as ringtones on the music and mobile portal Recochoku, one song per day. Jiyoung's "Wanna Do" was the first to be released, on August 22, Nicole's "Lost" was released on August 23, Hara's "Secret Love" on August 24, Gyuri's "Daydream" on August 25 and finished with Seung-yeon's "Guilty", released on August 26. The album covers and teasers of all music videos were revealed on August 30.

The music videos of "Secret Love" and "Daydream" premiered on the TV station Space Shower TV on August 31, "Lost" and "Wanna Do" premiered on the same channel on September 3 and "Guilty" premiered on September 4, on the channel Music On! TV. The music videos, with exception of "Guilty", features guests making the guy role of the story. "Wanna Do" features Supernova's member Park Geon-il, "Lost" features the actor Lee Jong-suk, "Secret Love" features ZE:A's member Siwan and "Daydream" features the actor Jung Suk-won.

=== Composition ===
The album is composed of twelve tracks, five of which are original songs sung by each member of the group. The remaining tracks instrumentals. The solo tracks are "Wanna Do", sung by Jiyoung, "Lost", sung by Nicole featuring 2AM's Jin-woon, "Secret Love", sung by Hara, "Daydream", sung by Gyuri and "Guilty", sung by Seung-yeon. A 2012 version of "Go Go Summer!" that released digitally on July 25, 2012, was also included in the album. This version was used to promote Live Dam's karaoke system "Furikara", which the standard version of the song and "Mister" were included.

"Wanna Do" and "Secret Love" were written by G-High and Lee Joo-hyung, who also composed the songs and were translated in Japanese by Mai Watarai. "Lost", "Guilty" and "Daydream" were written and composed by Sweetune (Song Soo-yun, Han Jae-ho and Kim Seung-soo). "Lost" was translated in Japanese by Emyli and also composed by An Jun-sung. "Daydream" was translated in Japanese by PA-NON and also composed by Hwang-hyun. "Guilty" was translated in Japanese by Onomiya Shino and also composed by Yue. Gyuri, Seungyeon, Hara, and Jiyoung helped pen the lyrics their own songs; Nicole penned the rap of her song.

=== Track listing ===
All editions track listing
No.	Title	Lyrics	Music	Length
1.	"Wanna Do" (ワナドゥ; Wanadou; Jiyoung solo)	Kang Ji-young, G-High, Lee Joo-hyung, Mai Watarai	G-High, Lee Joo-hyung	3:27
2.	"Lost" (ロスト; Rosuto) (Nicole solo with 2AM's Jin-woon)	Song Soo-yun, Emyli	Han Jae-ho, Kim Seung-soo, An Jun-sung	3:45
3.	"Secret Love" (シークレットラブ; Shīkuretto Rabu; Hara solo)	Goo Ha-ra, G-High, Lee Joo-hyung, Mai Watarai	G-High, Lee Joo-hyung	3:22
4.	"Daydream" (白昼夢; Hakuchūmu; Gyuri solo)	Park Gyu-ri, Song Soo-yun, PA-NON	Han Jae-ho, Kim Seung-soo, Hwang-hyun	3:50
5.	"Guilty" (ギルティ; Giruti; Seung-yeon solo)	Han Seung-yeon, Song Soo-yun, Onomiya Shino	Han Jae-ho, Kim Seung-soo, Yue	3:34
6.	"Go Go Summer! 2012" (GO GO サマー！ 2012; Go Go Samā! 2012)	Yu Shimoji	Han Sang-won, Lee Sang-ho, Kimzart	3:24
7.	"Wanna Do" (instrumental)		G-High, Lee Joo-hyung	3:27
8.	"Lost" (instrumental)		Han Jae-ho, Kim Seung-soo, An Jun-sung	3:45
9.	"Secret Love" (instrumental)		G-High, Lee Joo-hyung	3:22
10.	"Daydream" (instrumental)		Han Jae-ho, Kim Seung-soo, Hwang-hyun	3:50
11.	"Guilty" (instrumental)		Han Jae-ho, Kim Seung-soo, Yue	3:33
12.	"Go Go Summer! 2012" (instrumental)		Han Sang-won, Lee Sang-ho, Kimzart	3:21
Total length:				42:29

DVD (limited CD+DVD type A)
No.	Title	Length
1.	"Wanna Do" (music video)
2.	"Lost" (music video)
3.	"Secret Love" (music video)
4.	"Daydream" (music video)
5.	"Guilty" (music video)
6.	"Music videos behind the scenes" (music video clip メイキング・フィルム – off-shot movie)

DVD (limited CD+DVD type B) and iTunes Store Deluxe edition videos
No.	Title	Length
1.	"Wanna Do" (music video)
2.	"Lost" (music video)
3.	"Secret Love" (music video)
4.	"Daydream" (music video)
5.	"Guilty" (music video)

=== Chart performance ===
The solo songs were released as ringtones on the music and mobile portal Recochoku from August 22 to 26, one song per day. The songs ranked high in Recochoku Uta daily chart: "Wanna Do" peaked #6, "Lost" peaked #7, "Secret Love" peaked #9, "Daydream" peaked #11 and "Guilty" peaked #4. In Oricon, the album debuted at number three with 18,101 copies sold on the first day and 47,553 copies sold on the first week.

==== Charts ====
===== Oricon =====
Oricon Chart	Peak	Debut sales	Sales total	Chart run
Daily Albums Chart	3	18,101	70,941+	15 weeks
Weekly Albums Chart	3	47,553	70,941+	15 weeks
Monthly Albums Chart	8	62,748	70,941+	15 weeks
Yearly Albums Chart	99	70,542	70,941+	15 weeks

===== Other charts =====
Chart	Peak position
Billboard Japan Top Albums	3
Billboard Japan Yearly Top Albums (2012)	82

== Korean version ==
Kara Solo Collection

Compilation album by Kara
- Released: November 30, 2012 (South Korea); September 25, 2013 (Japan)
- Recorded: 2011–2012
- Genre: Dance-pop, pop rock, R&B, tango
- Length: 35:13
- Language: Korean
- Label: DSP Media

Kara chronology
Girls Forever (2012)	Kara Solo Collection (0000003)	Fantastic Girls (2013)

=== Background ===
Some rumors of a Korean version of the album were spreading around the internet since the Japanese release in September but in that time was not confirmed by the group's agency, DSP Media. On November 24, Mnet revealed in their "coming soon releases" that two songs from the Korean Kara Collection will be released on November 28. On November 27, the album release was confirmed by DSP Media. The album will be released on December 4 in two editions: limited and regular. The limited edition will include a special DVD including the music videos and special photocards with unveiled still-cuts from the music videos. It will be limited to 5,000 copies. The songs "Secret Love" and "Lost" were released on November 28 digitally along with their respective music videos on Kara's official YouTube account. "Daydream", "Wanna Do" and "Guilty" were released digitally on November 30, along with their respective music videos.

=== Composition ===
The songs "Daydream", "Guilty" and "Lost" were written by Song Soo-yun and produced by Han Jae-ho and Kim Seung-soo, also known as Sweetune. The songs "Secret Love" and "Wanna Do" were written and produced by G-High and Lee Joo-hyung. Gyuri, Seungyeon, Hara, and Jiyoung helped pen the lyrics of their own songs; Nicole penned the rap of her song.

=== Track listing ===
Official track listing
No.	Title	Lyrics	Music	Length
1.	"Daydream" (백일몽; Baegilmong; Gyuri solo)	Park Gyu-ri, Song Soo-yun	Han Jae-ho, Kim Seung-soo, Hwang-hyun	3:47
2.	"Guilty" (Seung-yeon solo)	Han Seung-yeon, Song Soo-yun	Han Jae-ho, Kim Seung-soo, Yue	3:29
3.	"Lost" (Nicole solo featuring 2AM's Jin-woon)	Song Soo-yun	Han Jae-ho, Kim Seung-soo, An Jun-sung	3:38
4.	"Secret Love" (Hara solo)	Goo Ha-ra, G-High, Lee Joo-hyung	G-High, Lee Joo-hyung	3:22
5.	"Wanna Do" (Jiyoung solo)	Kang Ji-young, G-High, Lee Joo-hyung	G-High, Lee Joo-hyung	3:23
6.	"Daydream" (instrumental)		Han Jae-ho, Kim Seung-soo, Hwang-hyun	3:45
7.	"Guilty" (Instrumental)		Han Jae-ho, Kim Seung-soo, Yue	3:28
8.	"Lost" (instrumental)		Han Jae-ho, Kim Seung-soo, An Jun-sung	3:38
9.	"Secret Love" (instrumental)		G-High, Lee Joo-hyung	3:22
10.	"Wanna Do" (instrumental)		G-High, Lee Joo-hyung	3:23
Total length:				35:15

Limited edition bonus DVD
No.	Title	Length
1.	"Daydream" (music video)
2.	"Guilty" (music video)
3.	"Lost" (music video)
4.	"Secret Love" (music video)
5.	"Wanna Do" (music video)

=== Charts ===
==== Album chart ====
Chart	Peak position
South Korea Gaon weekly album chart	3
South Korea Gaon weekly domestic album chart	3
South Korea Gaon monthly album chart	6
South Korea Gaon monthly domestic album chart	5

==== Singles chart ====
Song	Peak chart position	
Song	KOR	KOR
Song	Gaon Chart	K-Pop Billboard
"Daydream"	163	—
"Guilty"	155	—
"Lost"	85	68
"Secret Love"	82	74
"Wanna Do"	100	—

=== Sales and certifications ===
Chart (2012)	Amount
Gaon physical sales	14,575

== Release history ==
Country	Date	Format	Label
Japan	September 5, 2012	CD, digital download	Universal Sigma
South Korea	November 30, 2012	Digital download	DSP Media; CJ E&M
South Korea	December 4, 2012	CD	DSP Media; CJ E&M
Japan	September 25, 2013	CD, digital download	Universal Sigma
