= Speed Up/Girl's Power =

"Speed Up / Girl's Power"
- Regular edition cover

Single by Kara

from the album Girls Forever
- B-side: "Step" (Japanese)
- Released: March 21, 2012
- Genre: Electropop; dance-pop (Speed Up); Pop (Girl's Power)
- Length: 3:21 (Speed Up); 03:56 (Girl's Power)
- Label: Universal Sigma

Kara Japanese singles chronology
"Winter Magic" (2011)	"Speed Up / Girl's Power" (2012)	"Electric Boy" (2012)

"Speed Up / Girl's Power" (スピード アップ/ガールズ パワー) is the sixth Japanese single by South Korean girl group Kara. It was released on March 21, 2012, and was the group's first double A-side single.

== Background ==
Information about the single first emerged after someone on Twitter tweeted a picture of what appears to be of member JiYoung on the set of a music video. The picture was a screen capture from an iMac computer and showed "kara speed up" on top of the title bar. Details about a double A-side single titled "Speed Up / Girl's Power" being released on March 21 then began spreading around the internet.

Universal Music Japan eventually confirmed the single's release on February 27, 2012. On the same day Japanese program "ZIP!" aired a preview for both the song's music videos.

== Composition ==
The single contains two tracks of completely different sounds. The concept of the single was to show the members’ various personalities and the different sides of the group.

"Speed Up" is an electro and dance-pop song with an uptempo beat that uses light vocal enchantments. The song shows the group's mature side. It was produced by Congolese R&B singer-songwriter Mohombi who had previously worked with South Korean group BIG BANG on a number of their Japanese songs.

"Girl's Power" is mid-tempo song with a softer tone. It was produced by Han-San Wong who previously worked with the group for the single, "Go Go Summer!". It shows a more feminine and softer side to the group. The song is also being used for the new commercial of DARIYA's hair dye product line "Palty" which the group had previously endorsed in 2011.

== Music video ==
During the February 27 episode of the Japanese program ZIP!, a preview for the music videos of both single's was shown. They also showed a brief behind-the-scenes footage of the girls while recording the videos for both the singles as well as the group celebrating member Goo Hara's 21st birthday while sharing a cake with the staff and crew at the studio. On February 28, 2012, the teasers for both music videos was uploaded on the Universal Music Japan and the group's YouTube channels.

The music video for both songs premiered on Japan's Mezamashi TV on separate days with "Speed Up" first airing on March 1 followed by "Girl's Power" on March 2.

== Live performances ==
The group made the first performance of the song "Speed Up" on TBS's show Coming Soon!! on March 19 and another performances of the song on TBS's Count Down TV on March 24, on NHK's Music Japan on March 25, on TV Asahi's Music Station on April 6 during its 3-hour special and on Fuji TV's Hey! Hey! Hey! Music Champ on April 9.

The group also performed the songs during their Karasia tour in Japan.

== Track listing ==
Limited Type A and Regular edition:
No.	Title	Lyrics	Music	Length
1.	"Speed Up" (スピード アップ; Supīdo Appu)	Emyli	Mohombi Moupondo, Ivar Linsinski, Ninos Hanna, Robert Hanna	3:21
2.	"Girl's Power" (ガールズ パワー; Gāruzu Pawā)	PA-NON	Han Sang Won	3:56
3.	"Speed Up" (Instrumental)			3:21
4.	"Girl's Power" (Instrumental)			3:57
Total length:				14:34

Bonus Track (Limited Edition Version C)
No.	Title	Lyrics	Music	Length
5.	"Step" (Japanese version) (ステップ; Suteppu)	Song Soo Yoon, PA-NON, Kyasu Mochizuki	Han Jae Ho, Kim Seung Soo	3:22
Total length:				17:56

Limited Type B:
No.	Title	Lyrics	Music	Length
1.	"Girl's Power" (ガールズ パワー; Gāruzu Pawā)	PA-NON	Han Sang Won	3:56
2.	"Speed Up" (スピード アップ; Supīdo Appu)	Emyli	Mohombi Moupondo, Ivar Linsinski, Ninos Hanna, Robert Hanna	3:21
3.	"Girl's Power" (Instrumental)			3:57
4.	"Speed Up" (Instrumental)			3:21
Total length:				14:34

DVD (Limited Edition Type A: Speed Up version)
No.	Title	Length
1.	"Speed Up" (Music video)
2.	"Speed Up" (Music video – Close-Up version)
3.	"Speed Up" (Music video – Behind the Scenes)

DVD (Limited Edition Type B: Girl's Power version)
No.	Title	Length
1.	"Girl's Power" (Music video)
2.	"Girl's Power" (Music video – Dance version)
3.	"Girl's Power" (Music video – Behind the Scenes)

== Chart performance ==
On its first day of its physical release, the single sold 21,352 copies and quickly rose to No. 2 on the Oricon Daily chart. It sold 22,063 copies on the following day and placed 3rd.

=== Oricon chart ===
Released	Oricon Chart	Peak	Debut sales	Sales total
March 21, 2012	Daily Singles Chart	2	21,352	158,613+
March 21, 2012	Weekly Singles Chart	2	99,236	158,613+
March 21, 2012	Monthly Singles Chart	6	126,975	158,613+
March 21, 2012	Half-Year Singles Chart	25	153,538	158,613+
March 21, 2012	Yearly Singles Chart	49	158,613	158,613+

=== Other charts ===
==== Speed Up / Girl's Power ====
Chart	Peak position
Billboard Japan Hot Singles Sales	2
Billboard Japan Hot Singles Sales (as Girl's Power / Speed Up)	5
Billboard Japan Hot Singles Sales (2012)	63

==== Speed Up ====
Chart	Peak position
Billboard Japan Hot 100	3
Billboard Japan Hot Top Airplay	21
RIAJ Digital Track Chart weekly top 100	6

==== Girl's Power ====
Chart	Peak position
Billboard Japan Hot 100	7
Billboard Japan Hot Top Airplay	42
RIAJ Digital Track Chart weekly top 100	6

==== Step (Japanese version) ====
Chart	Peak position
Billboard Japan Hot 100	38
RIAJ Digital Track Chart weekly top 100	6

=== Sales and certifications ===
Chart	Amount
RIAJ physical single	Gold (100,000+)

== Release history ==
Country	Date	Format	Label
Japan	February 29, 2012	Digital download (Step)	Universal Sigma
Japan	March 14, 2012	Digital download (Girl's Power)	Universal Sigma
Japan	March 21, 2012	Digital download, CD single	Universal Sigma
