= Electric Boy =

- Regular edition cover

Single by Kara

from the album Girls Forever
- B-side: "Orion"; "Pandora" (Korean)
- Released: October 17, 2012
- Genre: Pop; dance-pop
- Length: 3:22
- Label: Universal Sigma
- Songwriters: Line Krogholm; Shalamon Baskin; Mikko Tamminen; Faya; Emyli
- Producer: Mikko Tamminen

Kara Japanese singles chronology
"Speed Up / Girl's Power" (2012)	"Electric Boy" (2012)	"Bye Bye Happy Days!" (2013)

"Electric Boy" (エレクトリックボーイ, Erekutorikku Bōi) is the seventh Japanese single by South Korean girl group Kara. It was released on October 17, 2012. The song is featured on the soundtrack of the third Japanese edition of Just Dance Wii U.

== Background ==
The single was announced by Universal Sigma and on Kara's official Japanese website on September 21, with the track list of the single, jacket covers and prices of every edition. The single was released in four different types, three limited editions: a CD+DVD edition including the CD single with the standard track list and a DVD including the music video of the song, a Close-Up version and behind the scenes from the music video, a CD+Photobook edition including the CD single with the standard track list and a 28-page photobook and a first press edition from the CD only edition including only the CD single itself with a bonus track, the original version of the song "Pandora", and a Regular edition, including only the CD single itself with the standard track list. All limited editions comes with a lottery ticket for the hand-shake event, to be held in October 21.

In October 3, it was announced that the group will make a special DJ launch event in October 17, day of the single's release, in a somewhere part of Tokyo and a hand-shake event in October 21 in Tokyo Big Sight.

== Composition ==
"Electric Boy" was written by Shalamon Baskin, Mikko Tamminen, Line Krogholm, Faya and Emyli and produced by Mikko Tamminen. "Orion", the single's b-side, was solely written and composed by Simon Isogai. He also composed the songs "Winter Magic" and "Ima, Okuritai 「Arigatō」" for the group. The bonus track, "Pandora", is a Korean song released on the group's fifth mini album of same name. It was written by Song Soo-yun and composed by Yue, Kim Seung-soo and Han Jae-ho.

== Music video ==
A 1-minute teaser of the music video of "Electric Boy" was released on Universal Music Japan's YouTube account on September 27, 2012. The full music video premiered on the TV channel Space Shower TV Plus two days later, on September 29.

== Track listing ==
Limited editions and CD only regular edition:
No.	Title	Lyrics	Music	Length
1.	"Electric Boy" (エレクトリックボーイ; Erekutorikku Bōi)	Line Krogholm, Shalamon Baskin, Mikko Tamminen, Faya, Emyli	Line Krogholm, Shalamon Baskin, Mikko Tamminen	3:22
2.	"Orion" (オリオン)	Simon Isogai	Simon Isogai	5:35
3.	"Electric Boy" (Instrumental)			3:22
4.	"Orion" (Instrumental)			5:36
Total length:				17:51

Bonus Track (CD only First Press edition):
No.	Title	Lyrics	Music	Length
5.	"Pandora" (Korean version)	Song Soo-yun	Yue, Kim Seung-soo and Han Jae-ho	3:11
Total length:				21:02

DVD (Limited Edition Type A)
No.	Title	Length
1.	"Electric Boy" (Music video)
2.	"Electric Boy" (Music video - Dance version)
3.	"Electric Boy" (Music video - Behind the Scenes)

== Chart performance ==
=== Oricon chart ===
Released	Oricon Chart	Peak	Debut sales	Sales total
October 17, 2012	Daily Singles Chart	1	28,604	76,248
October 17, 2012	Weekly Singles Chart	2	57,942	76,248
October 17, 2012	Monthly Singles Chart	8	70,161	76,248
October 17, 2012	Yearly Singles Chart	106	76,248	76,248

=== Billboard charts ===
Chart	Peak position
Billboard Japan Hot 100	1
Billboard Japan Hot Singles Sales	1
Billboard Japan Hot Top Airplay	2
Billboard Japan Adult Contemporary Airplay	2
Billboard Japan Hot Singles Sales (2012)	97

=== Sales and certifications ===
Chart	Amount
RIAJ physical single	Gold

== Release history ==
Country	Date	Format	Label
Japan	October 10, 2012	Ringtone	Universal Sigma
Japan	October 17, 2012	Digital download, CD single	Universal Sigma
