= Pandora (Kara EP) =

- Digital cover

EP by Kara
- Released: August 22, 2012
- Recorded: 2011–2012
- Studio: DSP Studios
- Genre: Synthpop
- Length: 16:02
- Language: Korean
- Label: DSP
- Producer: Kim Seung-soo; Han Jae-ho

Kara chronology
Super Girl (2011)	Pandora (2012)	Collection (2012)

Singles from Pandora
- 1. "Pandora" Released: August 22, 2012

Pandora is the fifth extended play (EP) by South Korean girl group Kara, released on August 22, 2012.

== Background ==
On August 6, 2012, the title track of the album was revealed. The song was apparently leaked at KBS' radio show, 2FM Super Junior's "Kiss the Radio" on August 17. Following the leak, the group's representatives and the staff working for the show apologized on Twitter and posted a message on the radio community board.

On August 7, 2012, the title was revealed by Kara's agency and explained its origin from Greek mythology. The concept of the album was to show the group's matured charms through a modern interpretation of Pandora's Box. Steward Ho for M.net noted that the group were about to "ditch their younger image and look more like empowered women". Member Nicole Jung stated during the album's show case that the group aimed to display their "maturing feminism".

== Composition ==
The EP contains four songs plus an instrumental version of the title track. The group worked with Han Jae-ho and Kim Seung-soo along with Sweetune, who produced most of the group's past material. The title track, "Pandora", is a synthpop dance track.

== Promotion ==
The group held a showcase to promote the release of the Pandora EP at the Seoul Walkerhill Hotel on August 22. The event was streamed live at M.net Global's website. The group's agency also stated that the members are devoting themselves towards the promotion of the album in South Korea.

Showcase Setlist

Live from Seoul Walkerhill Theater
Host: Kim Ji-hyeon

1. Pandora
2. Talk (Part 1: Kara's Pandora)
3. Pandora (Music video)
4. Lupin
5. Step
6. Talk (Part 2: Kamilia's Pandora)
7. Miss U
8. With My Heart (Dear Kamilia)
9. Honey

The group began their weekly promotions for the album starting on KBS' Music Bank where they performed some of the album's songs including "Pandora" and "Miss U".

A promotional truck that was entirely covered with the album's jacket cover traveled through various parts of Seoul, including Gangnam, Hongdae, Itaewon and Myeongdong.

== Critical reception ==
Enewsworld editor Erika Kim stated that the group had improved in their vocals. She complimented the member's role within the song and noted some influences from Japanese pop music such as the opening theme songs of magical-girl anime series like Sailor Moon. Throughout the day of release, the members of the group also become the most searched terms on several popular Korean search engines which includes Naver and Daum.

Following the music video's release, some concerns were raised regarding the group's suggestive choreography, a dance move where the members remove their jackets to reveal their backs. A representative for KBS's Music Bank stated that the group may need to make changes. However no changes were made when the group made their first televised performance on August 24 at the music program to start their weekly album promotion cycle.

== Commercial performance ==
In South Korea, the EP peaked at number 1 in Gaon Album Chart, and the title track peaked at number 2 in Gaon Digital Chart. The other three songs from the EP, "Way", "Miss U", and "Idiot" also placed on the Gaon Digital Chart. In Japan, the EP debuted at number 104 in Oricon Albums Chart through importation from South Korea. After the Japanese edition was released, the EP peaked number 15 on the Oricon Weekly Albums Chart.

== Accolades ==
Awards and nominations for Pandora
Year	Ceremony	Category	Result	Ref.
2012	Melon Music Awards	Popular Netizen Song Award	Nominated	
2013	Golden Disc Awards	Album Bonsang	Won	
2013	Golden Disc Awards	Album Daesang	Nominated	
2013	Golden Disc Awards	Popularity Award	Nominated	

Music program awards for "Pandora"
Program	Date	Ref.
Show Champion	August 28, 2012	
Music Bank	September 7, 2012	
M Countdown	September 13, 2012	

== Track listing ==
No.	Title	Lyrics	Music	Arrangement	Length
1.	"Way"	Song Soo-yun	Kim Seung-soo, Han Jae-ho	Kim Seung-soo, Han Jae-ho, Hong Seung-hyun	3:05
2.	"Pandora"	Song Soo-yun	Yue, Kim Seung-soo, Han Jae-ho	Yue, Kim Seung-soo, Han Jae-ho, Hong Seung-hyun	3:11
3.	"Idiot"	Hwang-hyun, Song Soo-yun	Hwang-hyun	Hwang-hyun, Hong Seung-hyun	3:24
4.	"그리운 날엔" (Miss U)	Song Soo-yun	Kim Seung-soo, An Joon-seong, Han Jae-ho	Kim Seung-soo, An Joon-seong, Han Jae-ho, Hong Seung-hyun	3:11
5.	"Pandora" (Instrumental)		Yue, Kim Seung-soo, Han Jae-ho	Yue, Kim Seung-soo, Han Jae-ho, Hong Seung-hyun	3:11
Total length:					16:02

DVD (Taiwan CD+DVD edition)
No.	Title	Length
1.	"Pandora" (Kang Ji-young music video teaser)
2.	"Pandora" (Goo Ha-ra music video teaser)
3.	"Pandora" (Park Gyu-ri music video teaser)
4.	"Pandora" (Nicole Jung music video teaser)
5.	"Pandora" (Han Seung-yeon music video teaser)
6.	"Pandora" (Group music video teaser)
7.	"Pandora" (Music video)

== Release history ==
Country	Date	Format	Label	Ref.
South Korea	August 22, 2012	CD, Digital download	DSP Media, CJ E&M	
Worldwide	August 22, 2012	Digital download	DSP Media, CJ E&M	
Taiwan	September 28, 2012	CD + DVD	Warner Music Taiwan	
Japan	October 31, 2012	CD	Universal Sigma	
