= Kara (South Korean group) =

South Korean K-pop girl group

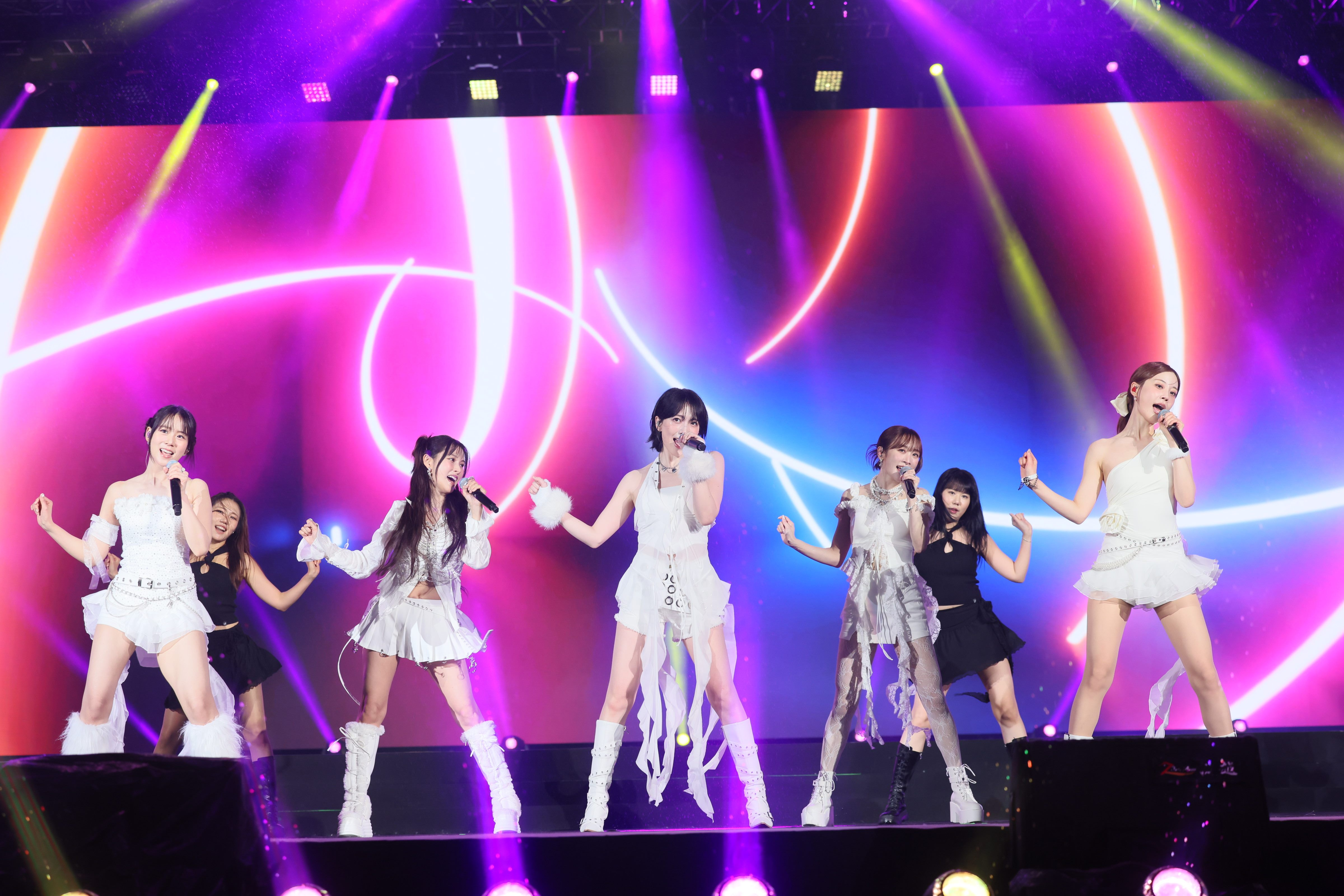
- Kara at 2026 Taipei New Year's Eve Party; L–R: Seungyeon, Gyuri, Jiyoung, Nicole, and Youngji

Background information
- Origin: Seoul, South Korea
- Genres: K-pop; synth-pop; R&B; electropop; disco
- Years active: 2007–2016; 2022–present
- Labels: DSP; RBW; Universal Sigma
- Members: Gyuri; Seungyeon; Nicole; Jiyoung; Youngji
- Past members: Sunghee; Hara
- Website: kara.bstage.in

Kara (Korean: 카라; Japanese: カラ; often stylized in all caps) /ˈkɑːrə/ is a South Korean girl group formed by DSP Media in 2007. The group's current lineup is Gyuri, Seungyeon, Nicole, Jiyoung, and Youngji. Kara made their debut in March 2007 with their first studio album, The First Bloooooming. Originally a quartet composed of Gyuri, Seungyeon, Nicole, and Kim Sunghee, Kara showcased a strong female image and a mature R&B sound. However, their debut was a commercial failure. The following year, Sunghee left the group due to educational issues, and members Goo Hara and Kang Ji-young were added.

Kara's image changed to a "pretty but natural" concept with the release of their first mini-album, Rock U, in July 2008. They saw an increase in recognition in 2009, where they received significant attention for the "butt dance" choreography in "Mister". In 2010, Kara began to promote their music in Japan by signing to Universal Music Japan's subsidiary label, Universal Sigma. Their Japanese debut was a commercial success, where they became the first foreign female group to top the Oricon Singles Chart in 30 years.

Kara's second Japanese album, Super Girl (2011), sold over 740,000 copies by the end of 2012. They recorded sales of over one million physical singles in Japan within two years, making them one of the fastest-selling South Korean acts in the country. In 2014, Nicole and Jiyoung decided not to renew their contracts with DSP Media and left the group. Following their departures, a reality TV show titled Kara Project aired to select a new member to join the group. Seven trainees from DSP Media took part in the program, and the winner, Hur Youngji, became the last member to join Kara.

On January 15, 2016, DSP Media announced Gyuri, Seungyeon, and Hara's contracts expired and left the company. For Kara's fifteenth anniversary in 2022, members Gyuri, Seungyeon, Nicole, Jiyoung, and Youngji reunited and released Move Again. They embarked on their fifth and sixth Karasia tours in 2024 and 2025, respectively.

== Name ==
The group's name comes from the Greek word "chara" (χαρά, lit. "joy"), which they interpreted to mean "sweet melody".

== History ==
=== 2007: Early beginnings and debut ===
The group started off as a quartet with members Park Gyuri, Han Seung-yeon, Kim Sung-hee, and Jung Nicole. On March 29, 2007, Kara debuted on Mnet's M Countdown with "Break It" from their first album The First Blooming. Their debut song displayed a strong female image and R&B sound. Other singles from the same album were titled "If U Wanna" and "Secret World". Music videos for the first two singles were created. Although their album was acclaimed by critics, it was not well received by the general public and was overshadowed by other girl groups who debuted the same year. All promotions for their first album ended in the summer of 2007. In August 2007, the group came out with a documentary on Mnet called Kara Self Camera which showcased the group, their talents, and the relationships they had with each other. The first season debuted on August 8, 2007, and ended on December 12, 2007, with over 15 episodes. In the following months, member Seungyeon continued participating in many television variety shows to keep the group's name recognizable to the public, as their first album was not a commercial success.

Comparisons were often drawn between them and their senior labelmates, Fin.K.L, because of their similarities in style and concept as well as the fact that the two groups were signed to the same label. Additionally, each individual member of Kara was paralleled to a member of Fin.K.L. In response to the comparisons, the members of Kara stated that they regarded the comparisons as beneficial and inspiring.

=== 2008: First line-up changes, Rock U, Pretty Girl and career breakthrough ===
The group was scheduled come back in March 2008 with their second album. However, on February 28, DSP announced that Sunghee would be leaving the group and retiring from the entertainment industry. She stated that her departure from the group was due to parental pressure to focus on her education after she failed all of her college exams. As a result, DSP announced that the second album that was recorded would be shelved and replaced by a mini-album to come in May; in addition, two members would join the group. Auditions were held, and the two new members were eventually revealed to be Goo Hara and Kang Jiyoung. The group made their return to the music industry as a quintet on July 24, 2008, with "Rock U" on M Countdown. Their first mini-album titled Rock U was released the next day. They made their comeback with a cute and playful image, the complete opposite of the group's mature image from their debut. The second season of Kara Self Camera premiered on August 18, 2008, and chronicled how the group was adapting to their two new members.

On November 29, 2008, DSP released a teaser video for their upcoming single, "Pretty Girl", which received over 40,000 hits within 12 hours. The full video was released online on December 2, 2008 and was positively received by the public. The EP Pretty Girl was released on December 4, embodying a "fun-party" concept. The group began promoting their comeback on all major music shows on December 4, 2008, starting with M Countdown. During their first national performance on KBS's Music Bank, member Goo Hara accidentally cried out live on air due to slipping on confetti, and reportedly cried profusely afterwards. The incident became a hot topic among viewers, but Goo Hara received comfort instead of criticism from the general public.

Park Gyuri attributed their popularity increase to their "pretty but natural" appeal, while media reports gave credit to the band for finally finding its own identity in the music industry since the group's debut and to older male fans, most notably singer Shin Hae Chul. Due to their increasingly hectic schedule as their popularity rose, a few of the group's members were taken to the hospital on December 19 after a Music Bank rehearsal for cold symptoms and exhaustion.

=== 2009: Rise in popularity in South Korea, Honey and Revolution ===
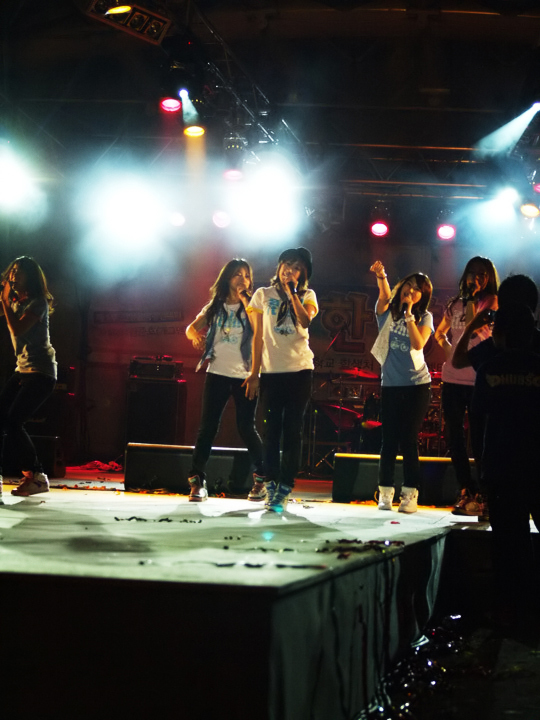
Kara and after school performing at the Hanyang University Festival, 2009

At the end of January 2009, DSP announced that it would commence voting on January 28 for the follow-up single to "Pretty Girl". The vote was hosted on the group's official website, and ended on February 2. "Honey" was the clear winner, with 60% of the votes. The song was remixed from the original version, and also underwent a slight name change from "하니" (Ha-ni) to "Honey". The group released the music video for "Honey" on February 16 and had their first live broadcast comeback on KBS's Music Bank program on February 13, 2009; a repackaged mini-album entitled Honey followed on February 19 which featured remixed versions of songs from the group's previous EP. "Honey" became the group's first number one single when it topped Gaon's weekly singles chart. The song earned the group their first music show award on M Countdown on March 5. It held onto the position for three nonconsecutive weeks. The song also won the Mutizen award on SBS's Inkigayo and the award for Best Dance at the 2009 Mnet Asian Music Awards.

At the end of March, the group was chosen for the fourth season of MBC's Idol Show, which marked the group's first hosting duties for a show. The group then appeared in a reality show called MTV Meta Friends, which chronicled a group of fans getting a chance to become friends with the group members. For the show, the group held their first concert since their debut in 2007.

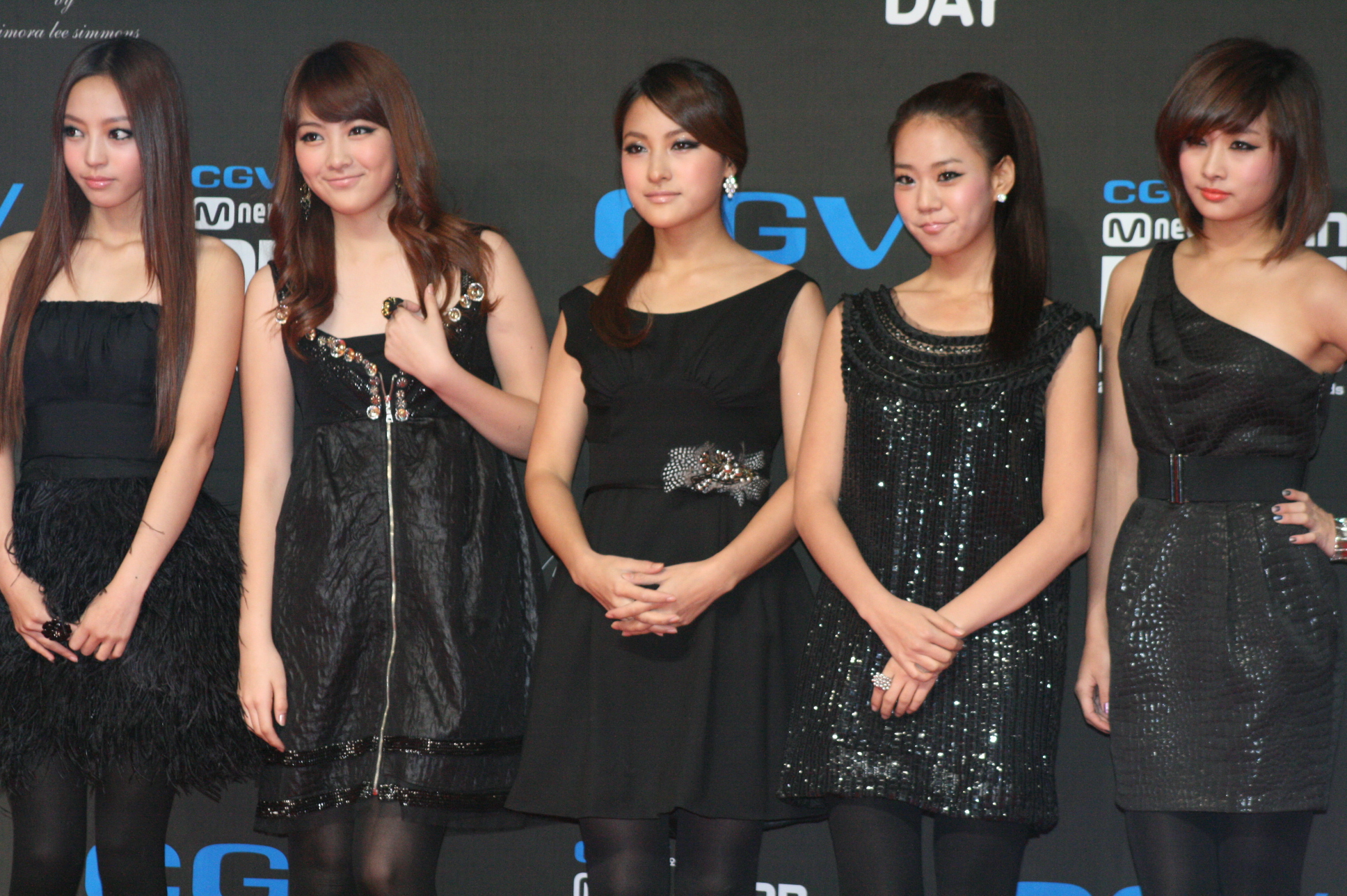
KARA on the red carpet of MAMA

In June 2009, the group stated they would make their comeback in late July, with their concept upgraded. The first teaser pictures of the group were released in mid-July, showing radical changes in the group's style and also saw a slight return of the strong and mature image previously seen in their debut. Their single "Wanna" was released on July 28, 2009, and immediately charted on various digital music charts. The music video was released on July 29, with the full album, Revolution, available online on July 30. Comeback activities commenced on July 31, beginning with Music Bank; the group performed both "Wanna" and "Mister". "Mister" proved to be popular with netizens due to the "butt dance" featured prominently in the choreography. Due to the popularity of "Mister", Kara's overall popularity increased, evidenced by an influx of advertisement requests by various companies; in total, they had more advertisements in October 2009 than they had had the previous two years. "Wanna" also became a number one single for the group and won the Mutizen award on August 30, 2009, from Inkigayo. During promotions for Revolution, the group also performed internationally, including at Bangkok's Parc Paragon.

On November 25, 2009, Mnet premiered the reality show Kara Bakery, which followed the group as they attempted to plan, open, and advertise their own bakery. The show had 8 episodes and ran until early 2010. All proceeds from the bakery was donated to charity. The group held a fan-meeting for their Japanese fans in February, marking the group's first promotional tour in Japan. Over 3,000 fans reportedly registered to attend, exceeding the capacity of the venue and resulting in a second showcase.

=== 2010: Lupin, Japanese debut, and Girl's Talk ===
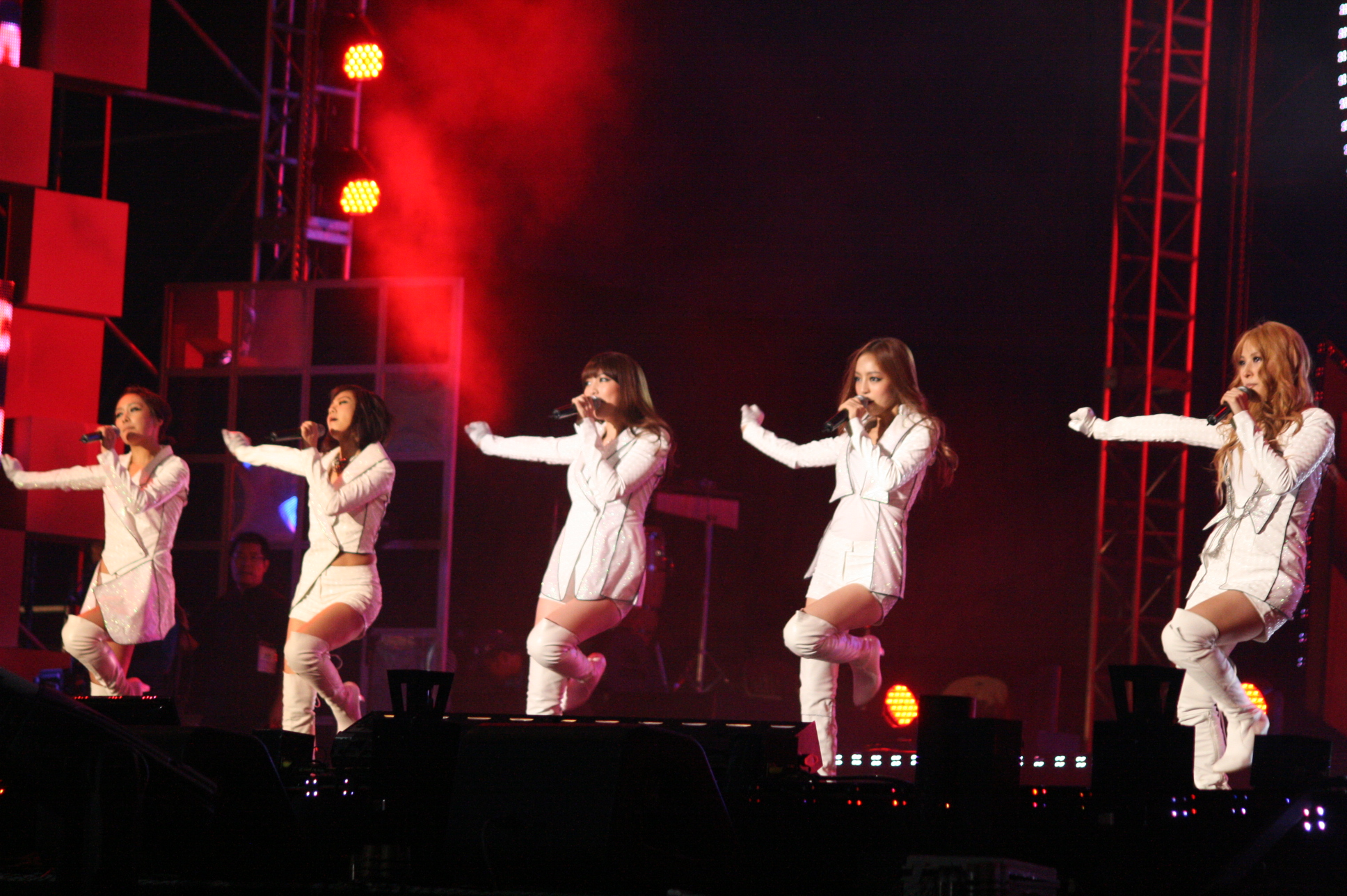
Kara in 2010

After a short hiatus, DSP released two teaser photos of the group's comeback concept on February 9, 2010. The photos garnered interest because compared to their past album concepts, the new photos showed the members in dark outfits and smokey makeup that elicited a darker, more mature, and sexier feel. The next day, the thief-themed album jacket was unveiled, as well as the title track "Lupin", which became number one on several online music charts shortly after release. The teaser video was released on February 12 on Naver; the EP, Lupin, followed on February 17. The music video was released on February 22, garnering more than 90,000 views in the first 2 hours. The group began their broadcasting comeback starting on M Countdown on February 25, 2010. On March 4, 2010, the group won their first number one award for "Lupin" on M Countdown. The following week, the group won yet another award on M Countdown, making it their second consecutive win on the music program. "Lupin" also gave the group their first number one win on Music Bank on March 12, 2010, making it the group's first win on this particular music show since their debut, holding onto the position for three consecutive weeks. The song also won the Mutizen award from Inkigayo on March 14.

In March 2010, it was announced that the group would participate in the 8th Annual Korean Music Festival to be held at Hollywood Bowl in Los Angeles, with member Jung Nicole as host. Afterwards, the group became very active in Japan, holding showcases and handshake events as preparation for their official Japanese debut. The group was featured in a video message for the show Arashi no Shukudai-kun, hosted by Japanese idol group Arashi. The group then held fan meetings on May 8 with more than 8,000 fans at Japan's Grand Prince Hotel. In addition, the group had an official Japan fan club meeting with 3,000 fans at Yokohama's Minato Mirai Hall on May 9. The group later signed with Universal Music Japan's subsidiary label, Universal Sigma. On August 11, the group released their debut Japanese single, the Japanese remake of their Korean song, "Mister". The single ranked in various music charts and proved to be very popular in Japan. Following the release, the single exceeded expectations with debut sales of 29,238 copies. The song eventually became the most downloaded song of all time by a Korean artist in Japan, with downloads exceeding 2 million as of March 2012.

The group released their second Japanese single titled "Jumping" on November 10, 2010. The song quickly climbed the charts, including mobile downloads, and debuted at number 5 on the Oricon Daily Singles Chart. It eventually rose to number 2, only behind Arashi. The single peaked at number 5 on Oricon's Weekly Singles Chart with first-week sales of 54,977. On September 29, 2010, the group released a compilation album, Kara Best 2007–2010. The album is a compilation of their selected Korean tracks. It ranked number two on the Oricon Daily Albums Chart on the first day of release, selling 18,223 copies. It was announced on November 3, 2010, that the album was certified gold by the RIAJ, making the group the first ever Korean group since the 1990s to release an all-Korean album that was able break the 100 thousand copies barrier in Japan. It was eventually certified platinum with shipments exceeding 250,000 copies.

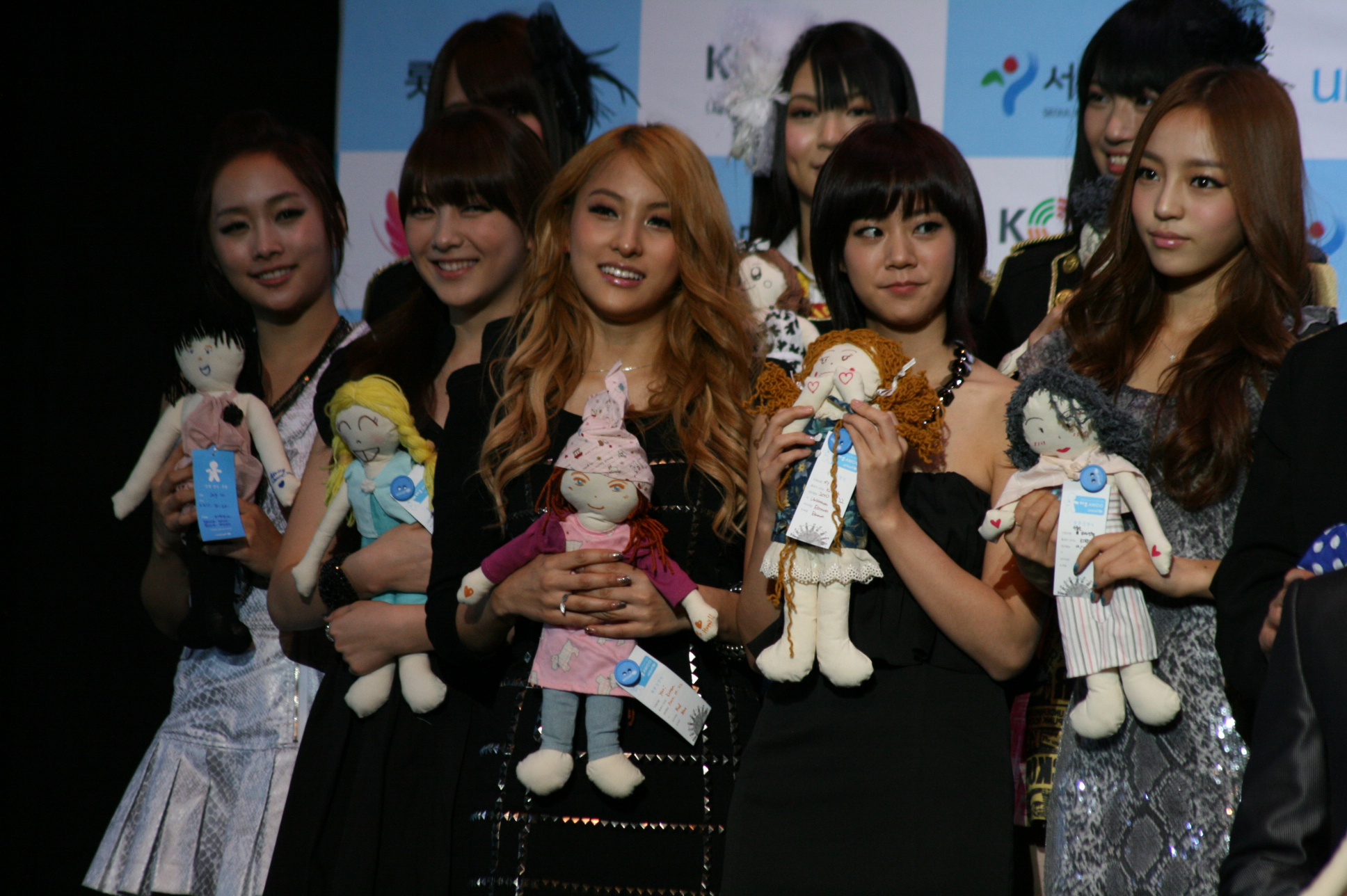
Kara at the 2010 Asia Song Festival press conference

On October 23, 2010, the band represented Korea and performed at the 7th annual Asia Song Festival, organized by Korea Foundation for International Culture Exchange (KOFICE), at the Seoul Olympic Stadium. Their debut Japanese album, Girl's Talk, was released on November 24, 2010. It sold 107,000 copies in its first week and ranked number 2 in the Oricon Weekly Album Chart, making this the first album by a non-Japanese girl group in Japan in 6 years and 9 months to sell more than 100,000 albums in its first week. The album was certified double platinum by the RIAJ on November 18, 2011, with sales exceeding half a million in Japan.

After taking a nine-month hiatus in the Korean music industry, the group announced the release of their single "Jumping", which was promoted in both Korea and Japan. It was released as the title track for their fourth Korean mini-album of the same name, Jumping. The group began a weekly promotion cycle starting with MBC's Show! Music Core on November 20, 2010. On December 10, the group eventually achieved their fourth win on Music Bank for "Jumping". Two days after their win on Music Bank, the group won the Mutizen award for "Jumping" on SBS's Inkigayo's 600th episode.

After a very successful year in Japan, the group was chosen as the Best Rookie Artist according to a popular Japanese mobile ringtone site, Recochoku. On December 20, 2010, Oricon also announced the group as 2010's Best Rookie Artist, generating revenue of some 1.3 billion yen (or US$15.4 million); and with a total of 493,000 copies of their releases sold this year.

=== 2011: Rise in popularity in Japan, Step, and Super Girl ===
On February 23, 2011, the group released a DVD called Kara Best Clips, which is a compilation of their past music videos. After one week, the group was able to set a record when they ranked number one in the Oricon's Weekly Composite DVD Chart for two weeks. This made them the first ever foreign artist to be number one for two consecutive weeks since the charts implementation in 1999. The DVD has sold approximately 230,183 copies.

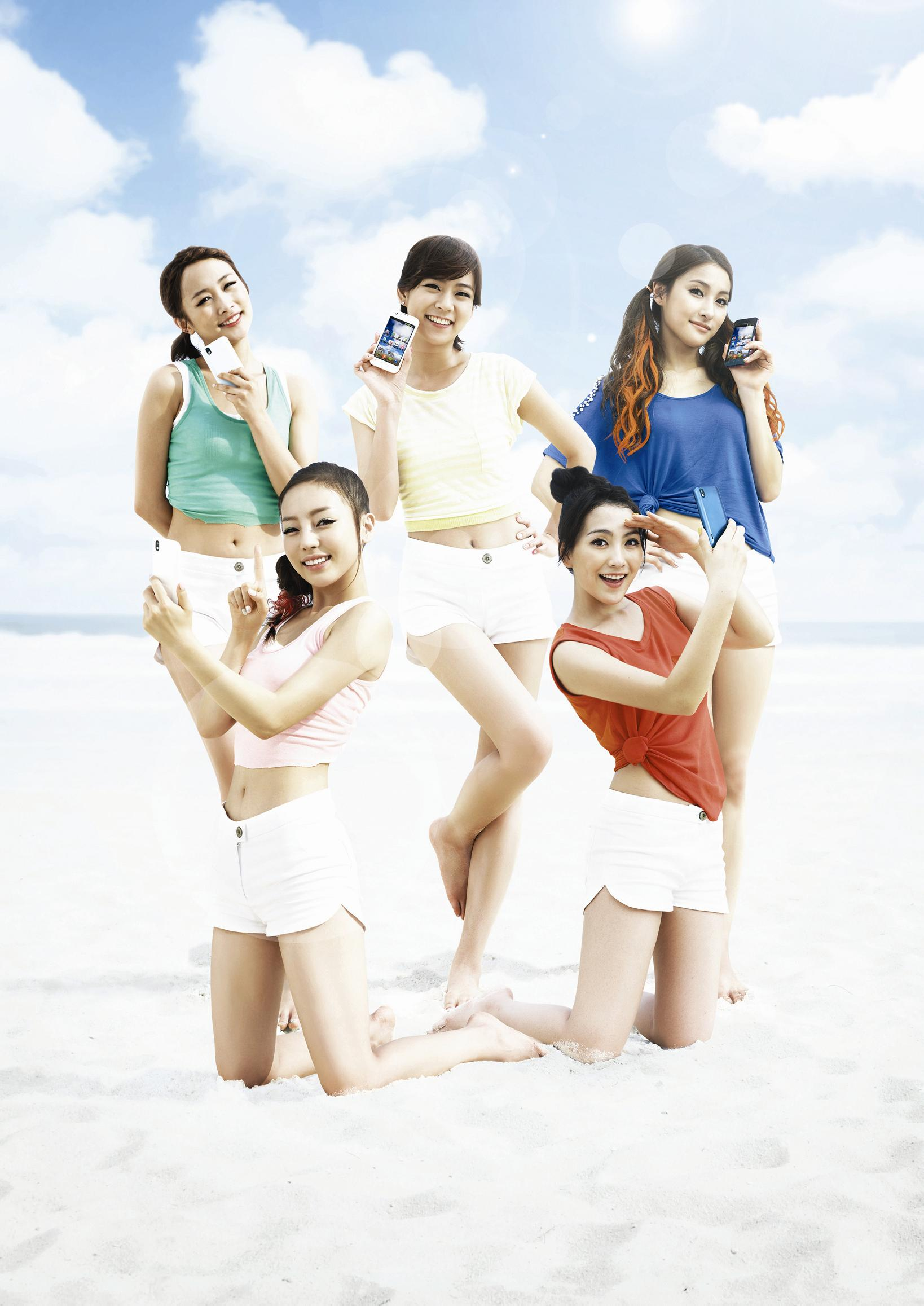
Kara in a promotional shoot for "Go Go Summer!"

On April 6, 2011, the group released their third Japanese single, "Jet Coaster Love", after the original release date was pushed back due to the 2011 Tōhoku earthquake and tsunami. The single debuted at number one on Oricon's Weekly Singles Chart with 122,820 copies sold on its first week. It also peaked at number two on Billboard's Japan Hot 100. Despite its success, plans for promotion in Japan were hindered due to the natural disaster. Instead, the group announced that all proceeds from the single will be donated to Japan's natural disaster relief aid. On June 22, the group released their fourth Japanese single, "Go Go Summer!". The single debuted at number two on Oricon's Weekly Singles Chart with sales of 113,873 copies sold on its first week. The song became the group's second single to sell over 100,000 copies on its first week.

On August 4, 2011, the group officially announced that they will be releasing their third official album in mid-September and will resume their activities in South Korea for the first time in over six months. According to industry representatives, the group has used some of their spare time recording songs for the album while they were busy promoting their fourth Japanese single, "Go Go Summer!". However, the group would only promote in Korea for about three weeks as they have many things scheduled in Japan. The group eventually released their third Korean studio album titled Step, on September 6. The album's title song, "Step", immediately topped various music charts in South Korea hours after its release. The song peaked at number two on Gaon's Weekly Singles Chart and number two Billboard's K-pop Hot 100. The group won first place on M Countdown on September 15 and Music Bank on September 16, holding onto both positions for two consecutive weeks. The song also won first place on Inkigayo on September 25. By the end of 2011, the album has sold over 100,000 copies in South Korea.

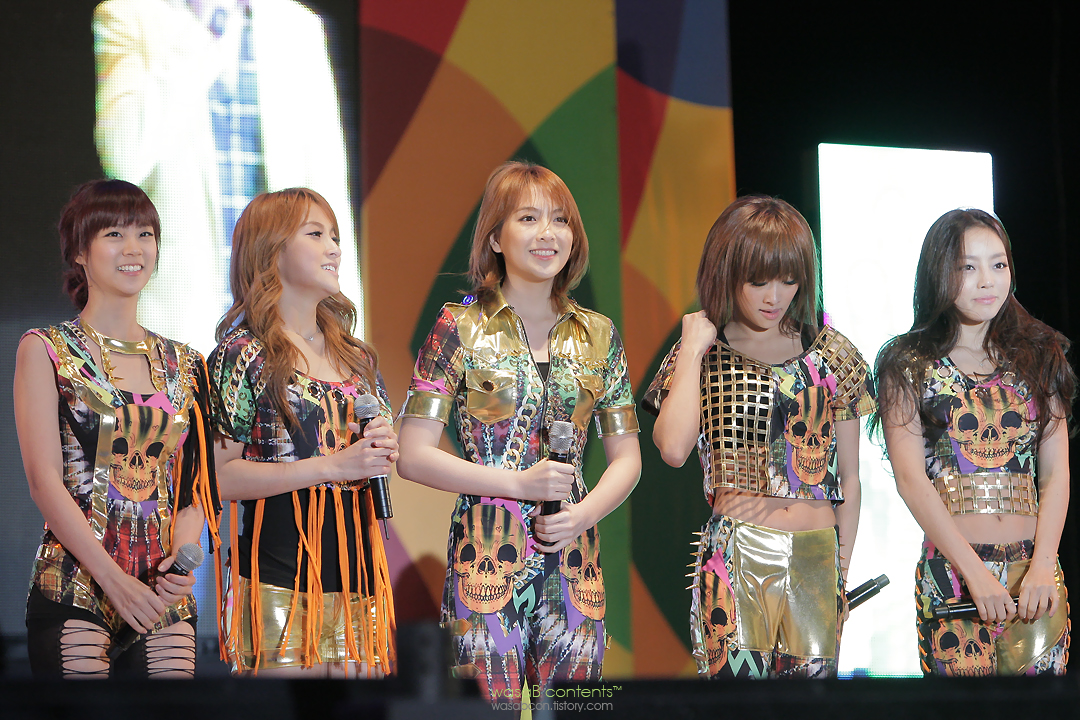
Kara promoting "Step" in October 2011

After the group finished their promotions in South Korea, they returned to Japan to release their fifth Japanese single, "Winter Magic", on October 19. The single ranked at number three on Oricon's Weekly Singles Chart with around 79,000 copies sold in the first week. On November 21, the group released their second Japanese studio album, Super Girl, which included all their Japanese singles released that year. The album received over 360,000 pre-orders alone. The album eventually went on to debut at number one on Oricon's Weekly Album Chart with sales of 275,206 copies sold, making it the group's first number one album in Japan. With it, the group broke the record set by The Nolans, becoming the first foreign female group in thirty years to top both the singles and albums rankings. The album was eventually certified triple platinum by the RIAJ with sales exceeding 750,000 copies.

After a busy year, the group celebrated their success by appearing on six major end-show programs in Japan. Among these were the 53rd annual Japanese Record Awards after "Go Go Summer!" was nominated in the category for "Best Song". They were also invited to the prestigious 62nd Kōhaku Uta Gassen, which is held annually at the end of the year, marking the group's first appearance on the program. They opened the second half of the program by performing a special medley of "Jet Coaster Love" and "Mister". Oricon also ranked the group at number four on the "Top 5 Best Selling Artists of the Year" in 2011 with fellow South Korean idol group Girls' Generation following closely at number five. On December 30, DSP announced that the group will embark on their first concert titled, Karasia, in early 2012. Expectations for the group's first concert were high due to Kara's status among the most successful girl groups in South Korea alongside Girls' Generation, 2NE1 and Wonder Girls.

=== 2012: Karasia, Pandora, and Girls Forever ===
On January 11, 2012, the group attended the Golden Disk Awards which was held in Osaka, where they won two awards; "Disk Bonsang" and "Best Hallyu Star Award". On January 18, the group was awarded with the "Asia Star Award" at the 7th Asia Model Awards Ceremony. The prize is a special honor only given to entertainers who played a pivotal role in spreading Asian culture throughout the world for a given year. The group was selected as the winner of the prize for the considerable achievement they've earned during the year of 2011 as one of the most favored Hallyu stars. On January 19, the group attended the Seoul Music Awards and were awarded the "Hallyu Special Award" and "Bonsang Award". On January 27, the RIAJ held the 26th annual Japan Gold Disc Awards ceremony, where the group was honored in five categories including "Best Asian Artist", "Best 3 Asian Albums" for Girl's Talk, "Song of the Year by Download" and "Best 5 Songs by Download" for "Jumping", and "Best Music Video" for Kara Best Clips. The group also received the GCS International Grand Award: "Korea-based Global Social Movement Proposed and Initiated" because of their donations to Japan's tsunami and earthquake relief.

On February 18, 2012, the group embarked on their first headlining Asian tour, Karasia. They held their first solo concert at Seoul Olympic Park on February 18, and held another concert there on the 19th. The tour extended into Japan for twelve shows beginning on April 14 in Yokohama. On May 27, the group successfully concluded their first Japanese tour in Saitama. The tour drew around 150,000 people. with every single seat for each concert being sold. The last concert was broadcast live through streaming in sixty different theaters throughout Japan, and all the tickets to the theaters were sold out as well.

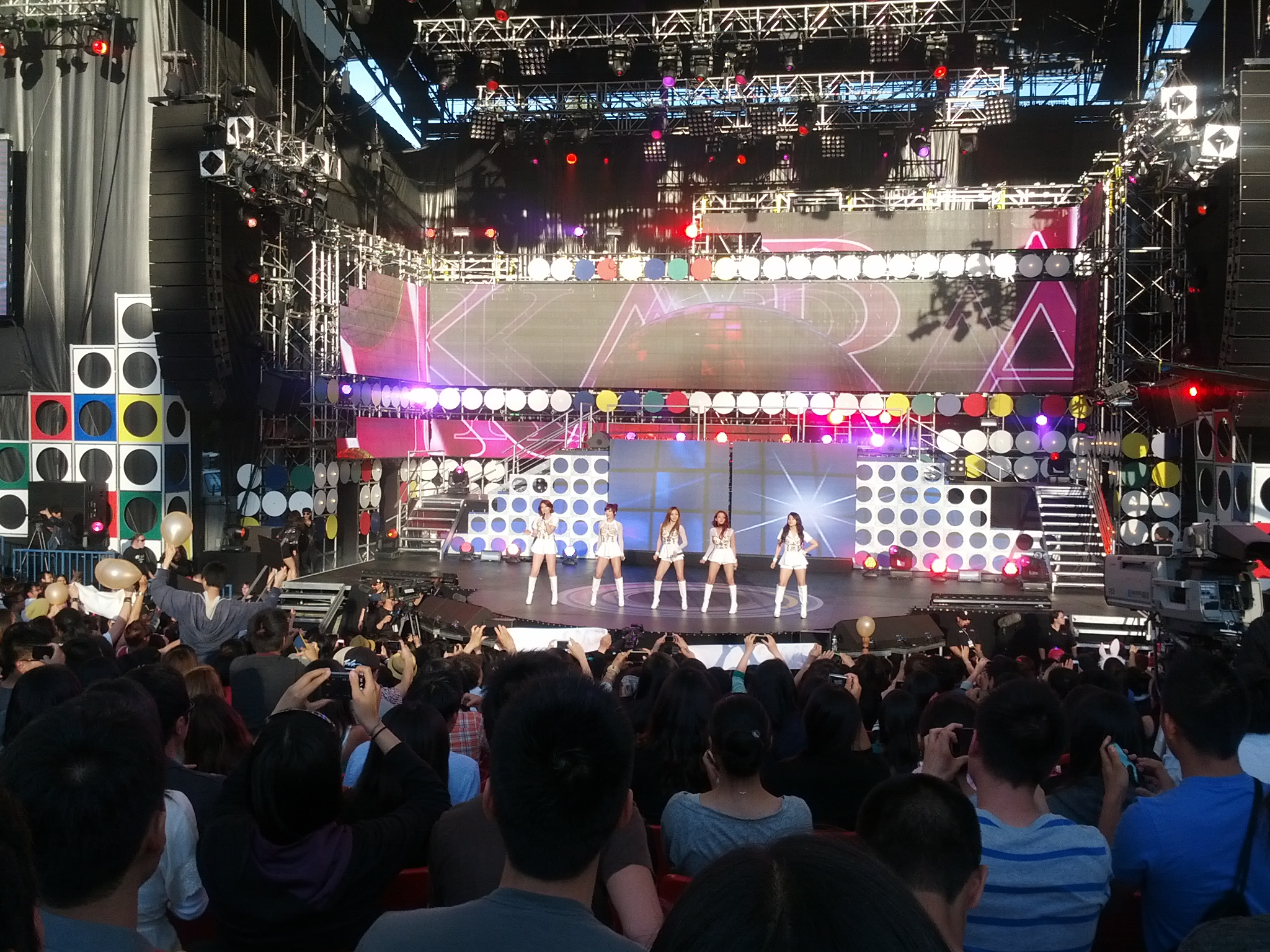
Kara performing in California in 2012

On February 29, 2012, the group became the first foreign artist to seize the top spot of two different categories on Oricon; the DVD and Blu-ray Disc ranking charts following the release of Kara Best Clips II & Shows. The group also became the fifth artist in Japan to achieve this record after Namie Amuro, AKB48, Mr. Children, and Radwimps. On March 21, the group released their sixth Japanese single and first double A-side single, "Speed Up / Girl's Power". The single debuted at number two on Oricon's Weekly Singles Chart with sales of 99,236 copies sold on its first week. On April 13, following the gold certification of their sixth Japanese single for sales exceeding 100,000 copies, it was reported that the group had sold more than one million physical copies of their singles in Japan, making them the third South Korean artist to do so after BoA and TVXQ.

On July 14, 2012, the group performed at the MTV World Stage in Malaysia. They were one of the four acts including Justin Bieber, Jay Park, and Malaysian singer Mizz Nina. On August 3, 2012, DSP announced that the group are set to release their fifth mini-album in South Korea at the end of August and will be aiming to show their matured charms through its concept. On August 6, their agency revealed the album's title, Pandora, based on Greek mythology. They explained that the girls will be "reinterpreting the myth to express the most captivating and beautiful woman of this generation". From August 13 onwards, teasers featuring each of the members were released on consecutive days, starting with Jiyoung, then Hara, Gyuri, Nicole, then Seungyeon. On August 20, a group teaser was released. The mini-album along with the music video for the title track, "Pandora", was released on August 22. A showcase was held on the same day and was streamed live worldwide. Hours after release, the album's title track topped various music charts in Korea. The song peaked at number two on Gaon's Weekly Singles chart and number three on Billboard's Korea K-Pop Hot 100, and was voted the most popular song in the month of August on Melon.

On September 5, 2012, the group released a special album entitled Kara Collection in Japan. The album includes the members' solo songs performed on their first tour, Karasia, in Japanese. The album debuted at number three on Oricon's Weekly Albums Chart with debut sales of 47,533 copies sold on its first week. On October 17, the group released their seventh Japanese single, "Electric Boy". The single debuted at number two on Oricon's Weekly Singles Chart with sales of 57,942 copies sold on its first week. On October 29, the group achieved their first number one single on Billboard's Japan Hot 100 when "Electric Boy" jumped to the top position. The single has been certified gold by the RIAJ. In the same month, DSP announced the release of the group's third Japanese album, Girls Forever, which was released on November 14. The album included the singles "Speed Up / Girl's Power" and "Electric Boy" as well as the 2012 versions of the singles from their previous album. It debuted on Oricon's Weekly Album Chart at number two with first week sales of 73,224 copies. DSP also announced that the group will hold a concert in the Tokyo Dome on January 6, 2013. This makes the group the first female South Korean act to hold a concert at this particular venue. On December 14, 2012, Kara released a short version of Orion. The full version was released on December 17, 2012.

=== 2013: Fantastic Girls and Full Bloom ===
On January 6, Kara held a special New Years concert at Tokyo Dome in Japan, titled "Karasia 2013 Happy New Year in Tokyo Dome". The concert was successful, selling out all 45,000 tickets within five minutes and became the first Korean girl group to hold a concert at the Tokyo Dome. During the concert, the group announced that there will be an anime series from the girl group depicting animated versions of the members, entitled KARA the Animation. On March 1, the anime series premiered, which featured five 27 minute episodes about each of the members pursuing different careers; for example, two feature Jiyoung as a firefighter and Nicole as a captain of a ship. The show aired in Japan and South Korea.

On March 27, Kara released their 8th Japanese single titled "Bye Bye Happy Days!". The single debuted at number 2 on the Oricon Weekly Single Chart, with sales of 65,588. On June 23, Kara held their 2nd Japanese fan-meeting called "Kamilia School" at the Yokohama Arena on the 23rd with a total of 24,000 attendees. Kara transformed into professors and split up the meeting into three educational sessions focusing on music, art, and language. On July 24, the group released their ninth Japanese single titled "Thank You Summer Love". It was announced on July 29 that the group's fourth Japanese album, Fantastic Girls, will be released August 28.

On August 16, it was announced that the group will be releasing their fourth South Korean full-length album with a title-track called "Damaged Lady", on September 2. Teaser pictures show each member wearing formal androgynous attire. The album's first single, "Runaway", was released ahead of the album on August 21. The music video for the song contained scenes from the group's upcoming Korean drama titled Secret Love. The group will be holding an album showcase at UNIQLO-AX Hall to celebrate its release and will be live streamed on Naver. On August 22, a photo album was uploaded on the group's Facebook page titled "Princesses" showing each member in white feminine dresses and unveiling the title of the album to be Full Bloom. The following day, another photo album was uploaded titled "Queens" where the members can be seen wearing tiaras and unveiling the English name of the promotional track as "Damaged Lady". On October 19, the group received the Best Female Group Award at the Korean Entertainment 10th Anniversary Awards.

=== 2014–2016: Second line-up changes, Day & Night, In Love, Girl's Story and disbandment ===
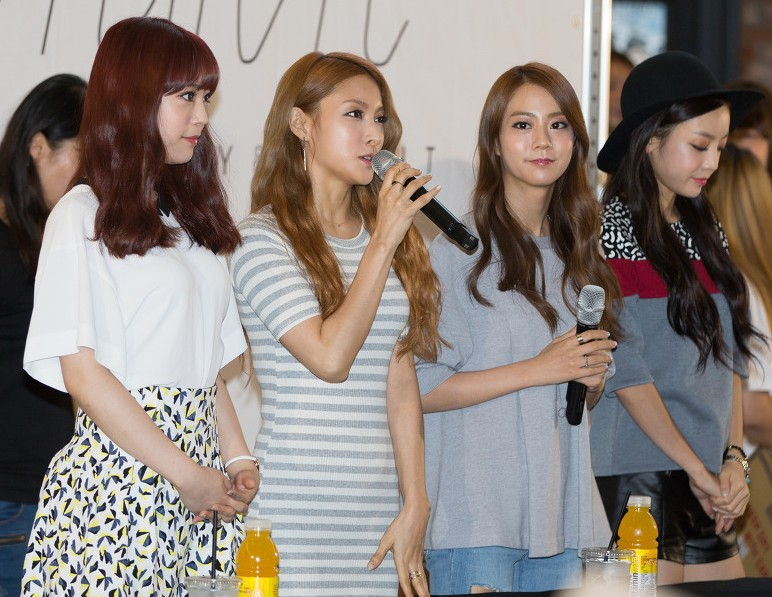
Kara at the fansign for "Day & Night" in August 2014

On January 13, 2014, it was announced that Nicole would be withdrawing from the group due to the expiration of her contract with DSP Media. Then on January 15, it was announced that Jiyoung would also leave the group after her contract expired in April 2014. The group then reorganized with Gyuri, Seungyeon, and Hara as a trio who would be carrying on future schedules. In May 2014, DSP Media launched a reality TV show called Kara Project which revolves around seven trainees (including former members of DSP's group Puretty) who will compete to become future members of the group. On July 1, the live voting results were revealed and Hur Youngji was proclaimed the winner with a total score of 49,591.

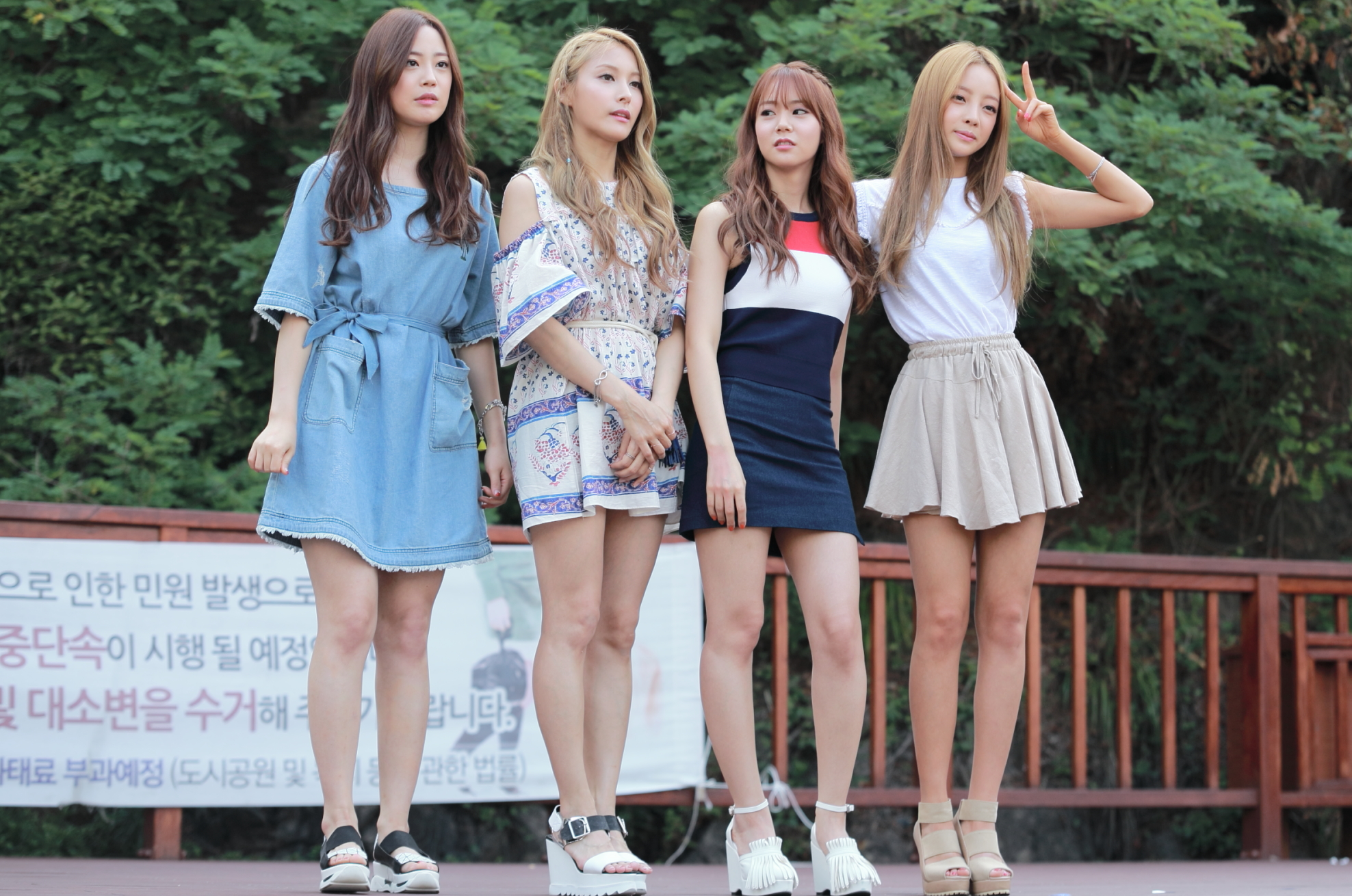
Kara at a fan meet in June 2015

The group's drama series, titled Secret Love, first aired on June 13, 2014, at DRAMAcube and ran for six weeks. The drama revolved around the love stories of each member of the group including Nicole and Jiyoung. The group released their sixth extended play, Day & Night, in South Korea on August 18 before going on their third Japanese tour on October 24. They returned with track titled "Mamma Mia", which was produced by Duble Sidekick. A music video was filmed in the Gyonggi Province on July 9. Mamma Mia was also released as their 11th Japanese single and the first single to feature Youngji after Nicole and Jiyoung's departure. So Good was announced later as the B-side of the single.

On March 15, 2015, the group released a Japanese triple A-side single, "Summer-gic/Sunshine Miracle/Sunny Days". It topped Oricon Daily Singles Chart selling over 28,000 copies. Subsequently, It was ranked number two at the Oricon Weekly Singles Chart with sales of 52,496 copies, behind V6's "Timeless." The group released their seventh EP, In Love, on May 26, 2015. Its lead single, "Cupid", was performed prior to its official release at KBS' Dream Concert on May 23, 2015. The group released their fifth Japanese studio album, Girl's Story on June 17, 2015. The album includes their cover of Fin.K.L's "Forever Love." On July 17, 2015, it was announced that Kara would embark on their fourth Japanese tour beginning in September. The tour started on September 1, 2015, at Zepp Nanba in Osaka.

On January 15, 2016, DSP Media announced Gyuri, Seungyeon, and Hara's departure from the group due to contracts expiring, resulting in the group's disbandment. The company also noted that Youngji would continue her music career as a solo artist. Member Gyuri later contested reports of the group's disbandment, stating that if the opportunity arose in the future, the members would release an album. Youngji also voiced in September 2016 that she did not consider the group to be disbanded. However, no further updates were released following this interview.

On November 24, 2019, Hara was found dead in her home after committing suicide.

=== 2022–present: Reunion, Move Again, Karasia 2024 & I Do I Do ===
On June 11, 2022, former Kara members Gyuri, Seungyeon, Nicole, Jiyoung and Youngji reunited for a group photoshoot which was shared on each of their Instagram accounts. Three days later, it was reported that the members of Kara were in the process of discussing a reunion single in celebration of their 15th anniversary. On September 19, 2022, it was announced that Kara would be releasing an album under RBW to commemorate the 15th anniversary of their debut in November, with Nicole and Jiyoung rejoining the group. On October 18, it was confirmed that the new album, titled Move Again, would be released on November 29. On October 20, it was announced that the Japanese version of the album would be released. After the release of the new album, KARA will hold fan meetings in Fukuoka, Yokohama, etc. starting in Osaka, Japan on February 23, 2023.

On November 10, it was announced that Kara would be holding their comeback stage at the 2022 MAMA Awards. On November 11, it was confirmed the group had finished filming their comeback music video. On March 8, 2023, it was announced that Kara would be holding a fan meeting in South Korea on April 8, marking their first Korean fan meet in 9 years.

As of February 18, 2024, they no longer appear on RBW's list of artist on their website, but do on their Japanese website. On March 12, it was announced that Kara would be starring in a new reality show, focusing on the group embarking on a 15th anniversary vacation. It will be the group's first reality show since their debut. On April 3, Kara announced "The 5th Japan Tour 2024 Karasia," their first tour in 9 years after "The 4th Japan Tour 2015 Karasia." The tour will be held in Tokyo from August 17 to 18 and in Osaka from August 24 to 25.

On June 18, Kara announced they would have a comeback in July with a new single. This single, "I Do I Do," was released in both Japanese and Korean on July 24. The single debuted at 6th place in Japan's Oricon Daily Albums Chart on the first day of release. A pre-release single for this comeback, "Hello," was released on July 16, featuring vocals from late member Hara. The single was originally recorded in 2013 by Kara for their album Full Bloom, but ultimately wasn't included in it. It was later released in Japanese by Hara for her single, "Midnight Queen." On April 26, 2025, Kara announced their upcoming tour of Japan, titled 'The 6th Japan Tour 2025 Karasia: Magical World'. The tour was held on July 5 to 6 in Yokohama & on August 2 to 3 in Kobe. On May 22, 2025, Kara announced the Karasia tour in Macau titled 'The Phoenix Tour'. The tour was held on August 30 at Macau Studio City Event Center. On December 30, 2025, Kara performed at "Korea-Japan Super Concert Commemorating the 60th Anniversary of Korea-Japan Diplomatic Relations" which held at Osaka, Japan. On December 31, 2025, Kara performed at Taipei New Year's Eve Party for the first time in 12 years.

On March 29, 2026, Hub Japan Co., Ltd. and X Voice officials announced through their official SNS that Kara will hold a group fan meeting in Japan titled "2026 Kara Japan Fanmeeting: Hello, Kamilia!" and the event is scheduled to take place on July 4 and 5, 2026, at Toyota Arena Tokyo in Tokyo. On May 31, Kara announced through their concert official website that they would be postponing their fanmeet due to various circumstances. On June 1, Kara announced "Hello Kamilia" fan meeting in Hong Kong and the fan meeting will hold on August 8 at Macpherson Stadium. On June 26, Kara announced a fan meeting in Taipei on August 22 at National Taiwan University Sports Center, and it is their first time performing in Taiwan in 14 years. On July 8, Kara announced they will performed as finale guest performer at "CPBL Wei Chuan Dragons’ Shin Kong Asia Music Festival" which held at Taipei Dome on August 2. On August 7, Kara announced that their fancon will conclide at Yokohama Buntai in October.On October 22, Kara announced they will held concert in Macau titled "2026 Once Again·再會澳門" GlowStage in Macau and the concert will held on November 28 at Broadway Theatre, Broadway Macau, Macau.

== Other ventures ==
=== Soundtracks ===
The original group recorded a song titled "Fighting" on the soundtrack for Chasing a Mother from Kangnam, a drama that aired on SBS; the soundtrack was released on July 25, 2007. The group also participated in the second soundtrack for Boys Over Flowers, recording the song "Love is Fire". "Same Heart" was a song used in i-Musician, an upcoming mobile game that the group promoted; the song was released digitally in June 2009. In January 2010, they sang the main original soundtrack of drama series "Catch Me a Star". The group appeared on MBC's Music Travel LaLaLa on October 22, 2009, where they performed "Road" by g.o.d and "Round and Round" with NoBrain. These tracks were included on Music Travel LaLaLa's soundtrack, released in February 2010.

In April 2010, it was revealed that the group will sing a cheer song for the 2010 FIFA World Cup entitled "We're with You". Behind-the-scenes and individual member teaser videos were revealed along with photos of the group wearing cheerleader outfits. The song was later included on the repackaged version of their second Japanese studio album, Super Girl. The single was released on May 3, 2010. The group also released a single "2ME", the soundtrack for online game We Online. In November 2010, Seungyeon's solo track "Superstar" for KBS's drama Mary Stayed Out All Night was revealed. In 2011, Gyuri and Hara recorded 2 songs for the soundtrack of the SBS's drama City Hunter. "시티헌터" sung by Gyuri was released on June 23 and "I Love U, I Want U, I Need U (Sweet Acoustic Version)" sung by Hara was released on July 27.

=== Endorsements ===
The group has endorsed online games, clothing, food & beverage, cosmetic products as well as shoes. Kara became endorsers of a cosmetics product, Mistine BB Wonder Compact in Thailand by April 2010. In May 2010, Kara became the female faces of Samsung Doogeun Doogeun Tomorrow Campaign. Kara has also been endorsing for Ask and also for fleece boot company Bear Paws. With the group's successful debut in Japan in August 2010, offers from different electronics, clothing and beverage brands started coming. In October 2010, it was revealed that group has sealed a revenue of 2 billion won from endorsements just 2 months after their Japanese debut. Officials said, "Kara shows a sophisticated image on stage while outside the stage, they show a friendly image"

On October 28, 2010, it was confirmed that Kara was chosen as the new models of one of the three biggest Carrier companies in Japan, "KDDI", showing their popularity. Starting on November 1, the group promoted the "Au Santa Letter of Challenge", organized by the "Au Smart Sports Run&Walk", where the group members dressed up in Santa Claus costumes, offering the users gifts with various contents. They also created a "Challenge Live" Twitter account where users posted support messages then 15 pairs people were chosen to attend the Limited Kara Live Event via lottery. Furthermore, with their success in Japan, Japanese game production company Rhaon Japan revealed through their official TalesLand official website that Kara became the new models for their game. Players were able to find group members as characters in the game, and were able to see a short animation of Kara, along with a promotional video on the landing page.

In 2010, the group opened their own online clothing franchise called "Karaya", which members Gyuri, Hara and Jiyoung were chosen as spokesmodels. The said online shop proved to be a big hit and rose to 4th place in popularity among celebrity owned internet shopping mall sites. In June 2011, the group was chosen by LG Electronics as the Japanese CF models for their upcoming cellphone brand, LG "Optimus Bright". They also released their Japanese single titled 'Go Go Summer', which was used for the commercial and was promoted at the same time. The commercial and print advertisements were launched on June 17. Moreover, members Park Gyuri, Goo Hara and Kang Jiyoung became the female models for Korean cosmetic brand "Nature Republic". The three members started their exclusive activities with Nature Republic on June 3, 2011.

On March 15, 2012, the group announced the release of their own figure dolls created with the "Mister" theme making them the first girl group launch their own toy-brand based upon themselves. The dolls were sold in South Korea and Japan. They were produced by professionals from Hot Toys, DC Comics, Nokia, and Enterbay. This also marked the first time that a doll-based on South Korean idol group has been released because in the past, figures were created for celebrities in Korea, namely actors. On June 18, 2012, the group released their own premium fragrance line called "K5J", an acronym for "Kara 5 Jewel" and members participated in the development of the perfume from the beginning. The fragrance is a special gift for the fans and to bring them even closer together. The perfume was created in Paris in partnership with 3CY, a premium Asian lifestyle brand. The perfume also went on sales at 1,200 offline stores in Japan. On August 29, 2012, DSP revealed that the group has been selected as the ambassadors to bring awareness to K-Food by the MAF and the aT Korea Agro-Fisheries Trade Corporation. Their advertisement campaign was distributed in China, Japan, and as well as Southeast Asia.

=== Solo activities ===
On January 16, 2012, it was announced that the members of the group will each release their own solo material for their concerts in February. Park Gyuri's song entitled "Daydream", Han Seung-yeon's song entitled "Guilty", Jung Nicole's song entitled "Lost" featuring 2AM's Jinwoon, Goo Hara's song entitled "Secret Love", and Kang Jiyoung's song entitled "Wanna Do" were all performed during their Karasia tour. All the songs were released one by one from August 22 to 26. The teasers for all the videos were released on August 31, 2012. The music videos for "Daydream" and "Secret Love" were released on September 1, 2012. The music videos for "Lost" and "Wanna Do" were released on September 3, 2012. The next day, the music video for "Guilty" was released. The songs were included in their compilation album entitled Kara Collection. In July 2015, Hara became the first member of Kara to make a solo debut with the EP, Alohara (Can You Feel It?).

== Controversy ==
=== Request for contract termination ===
On January 19, 2011, a lawyer representing four of the five Kara members announced to the media that they would be terminating their contract with DSP Entertainment, effective immediately; a lawsuit was also filed on their behalf. Park Gyuri, the leader of the group, was the only one remaining with their management company. In one statement, the lawyer representing the four stated that "the company repeatedly denied any requests and unilaterally forced tasks upon the members," and that they had been preparing for legal action for two months. Later that day, it was announced that Goo Hara would discontinue her involvement with the lawsuit and rejoin the company, as she had not been fully aware of the lawsuit's details. In a statement, DSP Entertainment firmly rebutted all accusations, also stating that they wished to resolve the issues and reconcile with the members quickly. DSP also denied earlier reports of denying Kara members their fair share of profits, stating that each member was paid ₩300,000,000 for their work.

The lawyer for the three remaining members released another statement giving further details of their allegations. Their representatives stated that they were misinformed regarding their Japanese promotions, and that their relationship with the company severely deteriorated with the hospitalization of CEO Lee Ho-yeon in March 2010. On April 28, 2011, the dispute between DSP Entertainment and Kara's 3 members (Han Seung-yeon, Nicole Jung, Kang Ji-young) was finally resolved.

== Members ==
Current members

- Gyuri (박규리) (2007–2016, 2022–present)
- Seungyeon (한승연) (2007–2016, 2022–present)
- Nicole (정용주) (2007–2014, 2022–present)
- Jiyoung (강지영) (2008–2014, 2022–present)
- Youngji (허영지) (2014–2016, 2022–present)

Former members

- Sunghee (김성희) (2007–2008)
- Hara (구하라) (2008–2016; died 2019)

== Discography ==
Korean albums

- The First Bloooooming (2007)
- Revolution (2009)
- Step (2011)
- Full Bloom (2013)

Japanese albums

- Girl's Talk (2010)
- Super Girl (2011)
- Girls Forever (2012)
- Fantastic Girls (2013)
- Girls Story (2015)

== Tours ==
- Karasia
  - The First Japan Tour (2012–13)
  - The Second Japan Tour (2013)
  - The Third Japan Tour (2014)
  - The Fourth Japan Tour (2015)
  - The Fifth Japan Tour (2024)
  - The Sixth Japan Tour: Magical World (2025)
  - The Phoenix Tour (2025)

Hello, Kamilia!
Date	City	Country	Venue
8 August 2026	Hong Kong	China	Macpherson Stadium
22 August 2026	Taipei	Taiwan	NTU Sports Center
23 October 2026	Yokohama	Japan	Yokohama Buntai
24 October 2026	Yokohama	Japan	Yokohama Buntai

2026 KARA「Once Again·再會澳門」GlowStage in Macau
Date	City	Country	Venue
28 November 2026	Macau	China	Broadway Macau

== See also ==
- Girl group
- List of best-selling girl groups
