= Jumping (Kara song) =

2010 single by Kara

Single by Kara

from the album Jumping and Girl's Talk
- B-side: "Burn"
- Released: November 10, 2010
- Recorded: 2010
- Genre: Dance-pop
- Length: 2:58
- Label: Universal Sigma
- Composers: Han Jae-ho, Kim Seung-soo
- Lyricists: Song So-yoon, Natsumi Watanabe
- Producer: Sweetune

Kara Korean singles chronology
"Lupin" (2010)	"Jumping" (2010)	"Step" (2011)

Kara Japanese singles chronology
"Mister" (2010)	"Jumping" (2010)	"Jet Coaster Love" (2011)

Music video
- "Jumping" on YouTube

"Jumping" (Korean: 점핑; Japanese: ジャンピン) is a song performed by South Korean girl group Kara from their debut Japanese album, Girl's Talk (2010) and their fourth EP, Jumping (2010). It was released on November 10, 2010, as the second Japanese single.

The single was certified as Gold for selling over 100,000 physical copies by the Recording Industry Association of Japan (RIAJ). The song was also certified as Double Platinum for ringtone downloads and Million for single track downloads by the RIAJ. A Korean version was also released and included as the lead title song for the group's fourth mini-album titled Jumping, which was released in South Korea on November 17, 2010.

== Background ==
On September 29, 2010, it was announced that Kara will be releasing their second single entitled "Jumping" on November 10, 2010. It was also said to be a brand-new song that will have an exclusive Japanese single release. "Jumping" was also chosen as the new theme song for Fuji TV's Saturday morning news and information program, Mezamashi Saturday. It was also revealed that the song and concept for "Jumping" was inspired by the anime movie, "The Girl Who Leapt Through Time". The song also served as a promotion for KDDI's "au Santa's Challenge." It was met with many positive reviews and a representative of production company Danal even commented, "Kara's popularity in Japan exceeds anything imaginable."

== Composition ==
The song was produced by Sweetune (Han Jae Ho and Kim Seung Soo) and written by Song Soo Yun. It was revealed that the song and concept for "Jumping" was inspired by the anime movie, The Girl Who Leapt Through Time.

== Commercial performance ==
The single debuted at #5 in the Oricon Daily Singles Chart and eventually rose to #2, behind Arashi's Hatenai Sora. The song quickly climbed up in other charts including mobile downloads. The music video and song also ranked #1 in iTunes Japan. The single ranked at #5 in the Oricon Weekly Singles Chart selling around 55,000 copies in its first week. In December 2010, the single was certified Gold by the Recording Industry Association of Japan for having over 100,000 copies shipped. Furthermore, their free music application "Kara Jumping" ranked #1 for the 'free music category' on Japan's iTunes App store chart, earning over 50,000 downloads within 10 days upon release without any official promotions. The song was then certified platinum by the RIAJ for cellphone digital downloads, and gold for PC downloads.

== Music videos ==
The promotional video teaser for "Jumping" was featured on Mezamashi TV on October 25, 2010. The full version was eventually released on October 28, 2010. The video features alternating scenes where they are seen wearing silvery white and dark black outfits. During the filming, it was reported that member Seungyeon cried a lot after being asked by the staff to shed a tear during an individual scene but she ended up sobbing because she became overwhelmed by her emotion.

=== au Smart Sports version ===
The 'au Smart Sports version' was also released through Universal Music Japan and Universal Sigma YouTube channels on November 5, 2010. In this version, the group are dressed as cheerleaders and marathon runners, helping to promote the popular Japan carrier KDDI's "au Santa's Challenge"(which is centered on the “Run & Walk” campaign).

=== South Korean version ===
Following the release of the group's fourth mini-album back in South Korea, a Korean version of the single was used as the title track for the album. The music video is the same as the Japanese version but contains slightly altered scenes including individual scenes where the group members are seen sitting in a black and white bedroom with a cell-phone on their hand.

== Track listing ==
Maxi single
No.	Title	Lyrics	Music	Length
1.	"Jumping (ジャンピン)"	Song Soo-yoon, Natsumi Watanabe	Han Jae-ho, Kim Seung-soo	2:58
2.	"Burn (バーン)"	Song Soo-yoon, Kenn Kato	Han Jae-ho, Kim Seung-soo	3:31
3.	"Jumping" (Instrumental)			2:59
4.	"Jumping (점핑)" (Bonus Track (Version C)	Song Soo-yoon	Han Jae-ho, Kim Seung-soo	2:57
Total length:				12:24

DVD (Version A)
No.	Title	Length
1.	"Jumping" (Music video)
2.	"Jumping" (Music Video – Dance version)
3.	"Jumping" (Music Video – Behind the Scenes)

== Charts ==
=== Weekly charts ===
Chart (2010)	Peak position
Japan Singles (Oricon)	5
Japan (Japan Hot 100)	4
Japan (RIAJ Digital Track Chart)	3
South Korea (Gaon)	3

=== Year-end charts ===
Chart (2010)	Position
Japan Singles (Oricon)	77
Japan (RIAJ Digital Track Chart)	50
South Korea (Gaon)	64
Chart (2011)	Position
Japan (RIAJ Digital Track Chart)	22

== Sales and certifications ==
Region	Certification	Certified units/sales
Japan (RIAJ) Digital single	Million	1,000,000^{*}
Japan (RIAJ) Physical single	Gold	120,000
Japan (RIAJ) Chaku-Uta	2× Platinum	500,000^{*}
Japan (RIAJ) Chaku-Uta Full	2× Platinum	500,000^{*}
^{*} Sales figures based on certification alone.

== Notes ==
1. As of January 2014, the RIAJ ceased to certify separately full-length cellphone downloads and PC downloads. Thus, full song downloads are now certified as single track downloads.
