= Park Gyu-ri =

South Korean singer (born 1988)

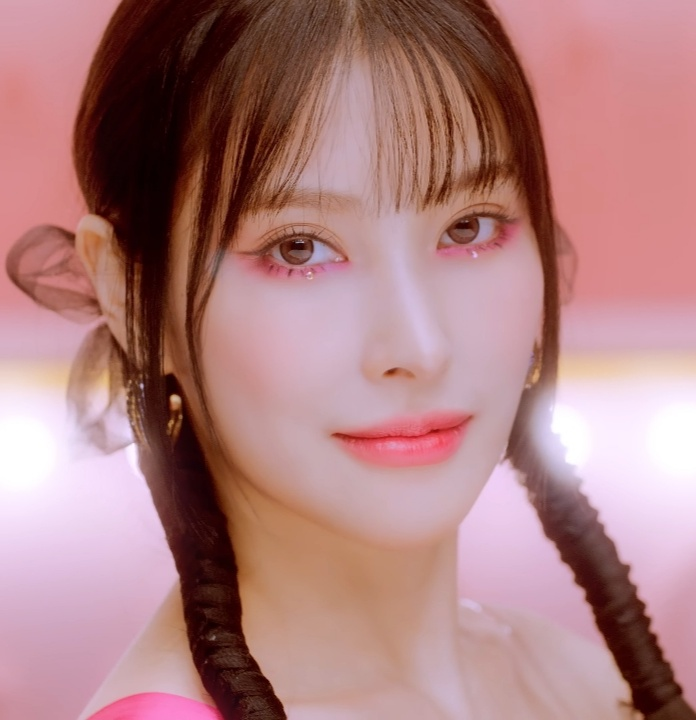
- Park in 2022
- Born: May 21, 1988 (age 38); Seoul, South Korea
- Occupations: Singer; actress; radio personality
- Years active: 1995–present
- Agent: Creative Kkot
- Musical career
- Genre: K-pop
- Instrument: Vocals
- Labels: DSP; Universal Sigma; EMI Music Japan
- Member of: Kara

Korean name
- Hangul: 박규리
- Hanja: 朴奎利
- RR: Bak Gyuri
- MR: Pak Kyuri

Park Gyu-ri (Korean: 박규리; born May 21, 1988), known by her mononym Gyuri, is a South Korean singer, actress, and radio personality. She is a member of South Korean girl group Kara.

== Life and career ==
=== 1988–2002: Early life and career beginnings ===
Park Gyu-ri was born on May 21, 1988, in Seoul, South Korea. She became a child actress with her first television appearance in the 1995 series Today is a Nice Day, in which she played the girlfriend of Kang Ho-dong's brother. In 2001, Park appeared as the teenage version of Kim Jung-eun's character in Ladies of the Palace.

=== 2007–2010: Breakthrough with Kara ===
She debuted as part of the four-member girl group Kara on March 29, 2007. As the leader of the group, Park came up with its name, which comes from the Greek word chara (χαρά, lit. "joy"). Kara underwent a number of lineup changes, but gained commercial success.

In 2009, she became a permanent guest on the reality television show Star Golden Bell.

Park featured in a duet with Hong Kyung-min titled "Day After" on his tenth album Special Edition, released on February 4, 2010. On April 21 that year, it was announced that she would become a radio DJ alongside Shindong on the MBC talk show ShimShimTapa after Kim Shin-young left. Their first broadcast aired on May 5, 2010. On September 26, 2011, Park announced that she would no longer DJ the show due to her busy schedule. Her last broadcast was on October 2, 2011.

=== 2011–present: Solo activities and rising popularity ===
On January 19, 2011, Park was the only member of Kara to remain with their label DSP Media during a contract dispute in which the other members released a statement announcing they were terminating their contract with their label. The contract dispute was later resolved. She was the voice of Kate in the Korean dub of Alpha and Omega, released in February 2011. On May 7, Park gave a lecture on her career in the entertainment industry at Seo Woon High School in Incheon, and on July 13, she hosted the "Music Bank in Tokyo K-Pop Festival". On July 15, she joined the cast of 200 Pounds Beauty Musical, which was shown in Japanese theaters. In November, Park was diagnosed with vocal fold nodules, but nevertheless continued to rehearse for the musical. She also hosted the "Seoul-Tokyo Music Festival 2011" on November 9. The musical ran for six performances in Korea from December 6–17. According to the show's production company, Show Note, the musical brought in significantly higher numbers of male audience members than average. Following the musical's successful run, Park underwent vocal cord surgery on February 21, 2012.

In 2012, she co-hosted the 26th Golden Disc Awards at the Osaka Dome in Japan.

On February 23, 2013, she hosted the Yang Yang K-Pop Festival at Naksan Beach. On June 2, Park hosted SGC Super Live 2013 in Tokyo.

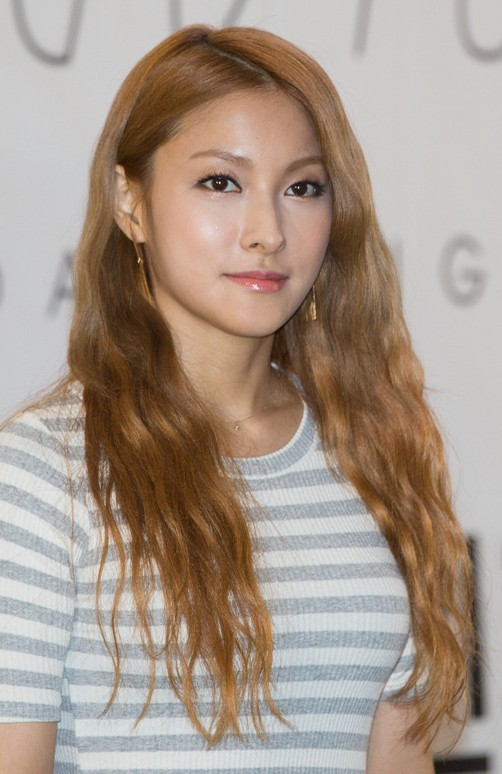
Park at a fansigning event in August 2014

In 2014, she was cast in the film Two Rooms, Two Nights.

On January 15, 2016, Park's contract with DSP Media expired. However, she stated that Kara had not disbanded even though its members were now under separate agencies, and that they hoped to collaborate on an album when the opportunity arose in the future. She then joined Motion Media to pursue a career in acting. The same year, Park was cast in the historical drama Jang Yeong-sil.

In 2018, she was cast in the film Miyak.

== Discography ==
=== As a featured artist ===
Year	Album	Single	Artist	Duration	Ref.
2010	MBC Music Travel LaLaLa Live Vol. 7	"Gil (Road)"	No Brain feat. Gyuri, SeungYeon & Nicole	04:00	
2010	MBC Music Travel LaLaLa Live Vol. 11	"Bingeul Bingeul" (빙글빙글)	No Brain feat. Gyuri & KARA	03:55	
2010	Hong Kyung Min Vol. 10 – Special Edition	"Day After" (일 후)	Gyuri & Hong Kyung-min	03:21	
2010	N/A	"If U Cannot"	Park Jung-min feat. Gyuri	03:43	
2010	G20 Seoul Summit 2010 Project Album	"Let's Go"	Gyuri, Changmin, Jun. K, Bumkey, Gayoon, Kahi, ANNA, JunHyung, G.NA, Luna, LaLa Seohyun, IU, G.O, Min, Jaekyung, Jonghyun, Jieun, Seo In-guk, Son Dam-bi & Sungmin	03:34	
2014	W Foundation Campaign	"Talk About Love"	Various artists	04:56	
2015	The Little Prince 6th Single	"The Little Prince"	Gyuri & From the Airport	03:34	
2015	The Little Prince 6th Single	"Return"	Gyuri & From the Airport	03:24	
2015	One Dream One Korea Project	"One Dream One Korea"	Various artists	04:56	
2017	The Boy Who Jumped	"Night And Day"	Gyuri & From the Airport	03:34	

=== Soundtrack appearances ===
Year	Soundtrack	Track	Duration	Notes	Ref.
2010	Daemul OST	"My Love" (내 사랑)	04:23	Duet with Kang Ji-young	
2011	200 Pounds Beauty OST	"Maria"	03:21		
2011	200 Pounds Beauty OST	"Beautiful Girl"	01:55		
2011	City Hunter OST	"Look Only At You" (그대만 봐요)	04:13		
2011	Bravo, My Love! OST	"Indecisive" (갈팡질팡)	03:36	Duet with Cho Hyun-young	
2012	Tasty Life OST Part 2	"I Love You More Than The Soul" (영혼보다 사랑해)	03:48		
2012	The Great Seer OST	"Breaking Fate" (운명을 깨고)	03:59		
2013	Nail Shop Paris OST	"I Will Wait For You" (기다릴 거에요)	03:46		
2013	Galileo 2 OST	"Kiss"	04:14		
2013	Galileo 2 OST	"The Most Loved"	05:46		
2013	—N/a	"Anata Ga Iru Kara"	04:22		
2014	Inspiring Generation OST	"Dream A Little Dream Of Me" (내 작은 꿈을 꿈)	02:55		
2014	—N/a	"Rolling In The Deep"	03:50		
2014	Secret Love OST	"First Love" (첫사랑)	03:30	Duet with Han Seung-yeon	
2014	Blade Man OST	"Hello"	03:02	Duet with Han Seung-yeon	
2014	—N/a	"Goodbye Days"	04:32	Duet with Han Seung-yeon	
2014	—N/a	"Hush Hush; Hush Hush"	04:31		
2015		"Sakura"	05:35		
2015	—N/a	"Endless Rain"	06:35		
2016	Two Rooms, Two Nights OST	"Spring Now"	03:36		

=== Other charted songs ===
Title	Year	Peak positions	Sales	Album
Title	Year	KOR	Sales	Album
"그대만 봐요" (Look Only At You)	2011	73	KOR: 208,717 (DL)	City Hunter OST Special
"Daydream"	2012	163		Kara Solo Collection

== Filmography ==
=== Film ===
Year	Title	Role	Notes	Ref.
2011	Alpha and Omega	Kate	Voice-over for the Korean-dubbed version	
2013	Kara The Animation	Herself	Voice-over for the Japanese-dubbed version	
2016	Two Rooms, Two Nights	Mi-na	Main role	
2016	How to Break Up with My Cat	Lee-jung	Main role	

=== Television ===
==== Drama ====
Year	Title	Role	Notes	Ref.
1995	Today is a Nice Day	Soo-mi		
2001	Ladies of the Palace			
2008	The Person is Coming	School Girl	with Goo Ha-ra, Nicole Jung and Kang Ji-young	
2009	Hero	Cameo		
2011	URAKARA	Gyu-ri		
2012	Reckless Family	Herself		
2012	What's Mom	Herself		
2013	Nail Shop Paris	Hong Yuh-joo		
2014	Secret Love	Park Sun-woo		
2015	Sweet	Jung Won		
2016	Jang Yeong-sil	Joo Bu-ryeong		
2017	Lovers in Bloom	Jang Eun Joo	Daily Drama	

==== Reality ====
Year	Title	Notes	Ref.
2009–2010	Sunday Sunday Night's "Parody Theater"	Go Eung-chan (Coffee Prince)	
2009–2010	Star Golden Bell	Permanent guest	
2009–2010	Strong Heart	Episode 4, 5, 13, 14, 51, 52, 100, 101	
2011	Lulu Lala	December 11, 2011 – February 19, 2012	
2012	Jewellery House	MC	
2013–2014	The Show	MC with Han Seung-yeon	
2014	SNS Expedition	With Jeong Jinwoon, Oh Sang-jin, Oh Man-seok, Seo Hyun-jin and Kim Min-jun	
2023	R U Next?	Coaches	

== Theatre and radio ==
=== Musical theatre ===
Year	Title	Role	Ref.
2011	200 Pounds Beauty	Jenny	
2021	I Loved You	Kim Eun-joo	
2023	Dream High	Yoon Baek-hee	

=== Radio shows ===
Date	Name	Notes	Ref.
September 23, 2009 – April 14, 2010	Super Junior's Kiss the Radio	Fixed guest DJ with Kang Ji-young	
May, 2009 – August, 2009	Donggo Dongrak Radio	Collaboration	
January, 2009	Starry Night Radio	Collaboration	
May 5, 2010 – October 3, 2011	MBC ShimShimTaPa	with Shindong	
January, 2010 – April, 2010	SS501 Music High	with SS501's Park Jungmin	

== Ambassadorship ==
- 7th Ulju Mountain Film Festival Ambassador (2022) with Um Hong-gil

== Awards and nominations ==
Year	Award	Category	Nominated work	Result	Ref.
2017	2017 Korea Drama Awards	Hallyu Star Award:	Lovers in Bloom	Won	
