= BM (rapper) =

American rapper (born 1992)

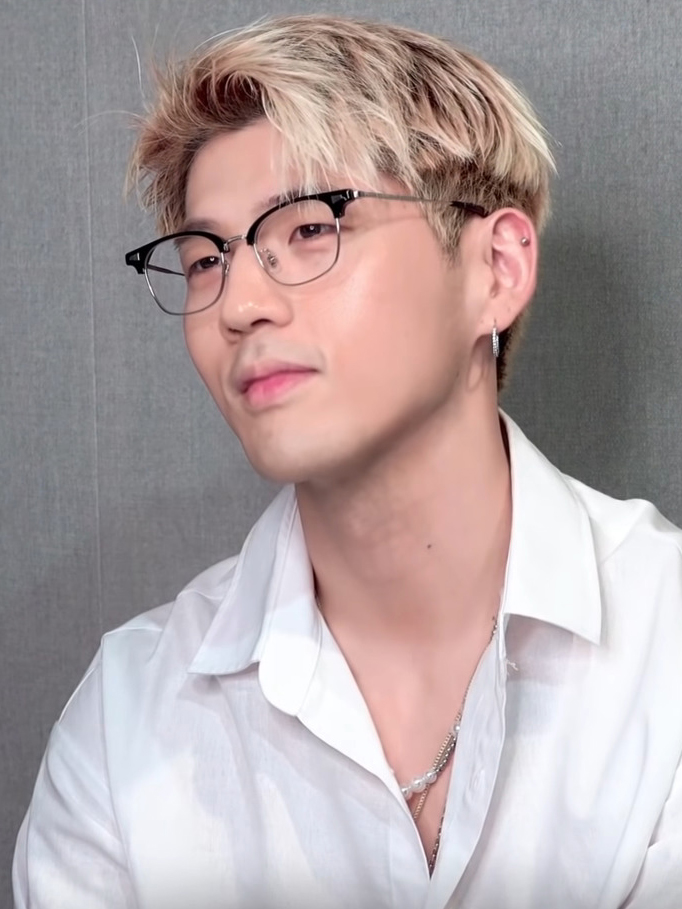
- BM in 2021

Background information
- Also known as: Big Matthew
- Born: Matthew Kim; October 20, 1992 (age 33); Los Angeles, California, U.S
- Genres: K-pop; hip hop
- Occupations: Rapper; songwriter; composer; actor
- Instrument: Vocals
- Years active: 2016–present
- Label: DSP
- Member of: Kard

Matthew Kim (born October 20, 1992), known by his stage name BM or Big Matthew, is an American rapper, songwriter, composer, and actor based in South Korea signed under DSP Media. He is best known as a member of the co-ed group Kard. He made his debut as a solo artist on June 9, 2021, with the single "Broken Me".

== Life and career ==
=== Early life and pre-debut ===
BM was born in Los Angeles, California, on October 20, 1992. BM moved to South Korea in 2011 in order to audition and take part in the first season of the SBS reality competition show K-pop Star. He entered within the top 50 of the competition, before eventually being eliminated. Due to his then poor Korean language skills, he forgot the lyrics during his audition on several occasions. After K-pop Star, he was recruited by DSP Media. He was featured in Goo Hara's song "La La La" from her 2015 debut EP Alohara (Can You Feel It?) and was her dance partner for the music video and live performances of its lead single "Choco Chip Cookies".

=== 2016–2020: Debut with Kard and solo activities ===
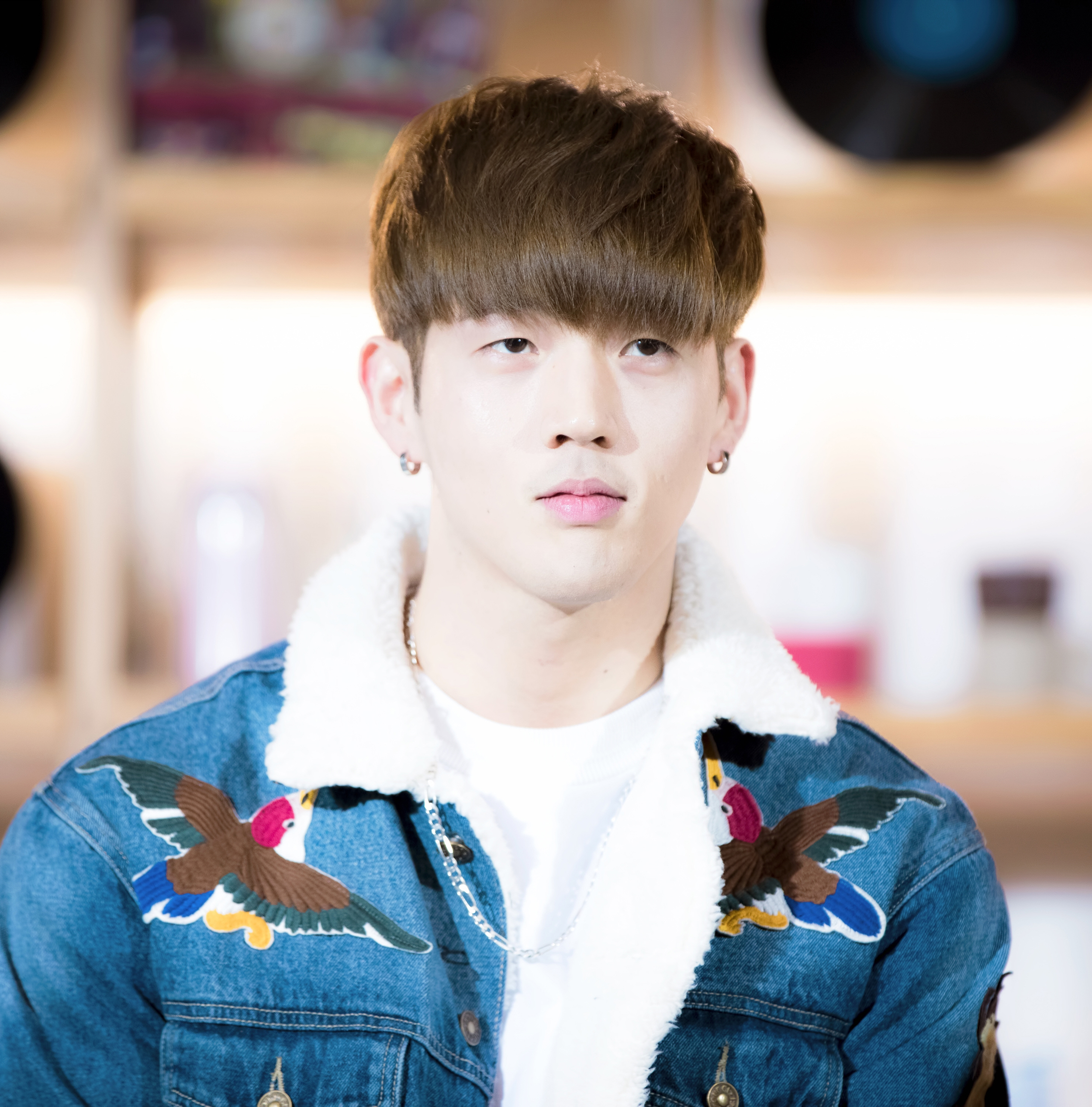
BM during a performance in 2016.

DSP Media first revealed the upcoming debut of its new co-ed group Kard along with its members on December 5, 2016, with a card game-based concept. BM was assigned a role as a "King" card. The group unveiled the first part of its debut project on December 13 with the release of their first single "Oh NaNa", and officially debuted on July 19, 2017, with their first EP Hola Hola.

In November 2018, BM was featured in the eponymous title track for singer Zsun's album I'm On My Wave. In the same month, he also uploaded the self-produced track "Better Myself" on SoundCloud.

On December 6, 2018, he made a guest appearance on the JTBC variety show Shall We Walk Together in celebration of g.o.d's 20th debut anniversary. He appeared alongside Woosung of Snuper and Heo Chan of Victon, wherein they visited and walked through the Santiago pilgrimage route for three days as they made their way towards g.o.d's dormitory.

In May 2019, BM appeared on the magazine cover of Men's Health Korea. He was then confirmed to be joining the lineup for the SBS television series Law Of The Jungle on June 6, appearing alongside several acts including Korean entertainer Kim Byung-man, PENTAGON’s Hongseok, Hong Soo-ah, and Nature’s Saebom. The show began airing a week later on June 13.

In September, he received his first major credits as the primary songwriter, composer, and producer for the single "Dumb Litty". The title of the song was derived from usual slang words used by BM when he lived in Los Angeles. BM had previously taken part in producing Kard's music, initially through writing and composing his rap parts.

In 2020, BM was cast in the Dive Studios variety program HWAITING!, starring alongside Ashley of Ladies' Code, Jae of Day6, Peniel of BTOB, Jamie Park and Amber Liu. The program first premiered on Facebook Watch on February 12. Since July, BM began hosting the DIVE Studios podcast Get Real alongside Peniel of BTOB and Ashley from Ladies' Code. He then featured in the track "Put It On Ya" alongside Korean rapper Nafla as part of Jessi's second EP Nuna which was released on July 30. On October 9, he appeared as an intern in the TBS show Hong Gi-mak Studio.

=== 2021–present: Solo debut with The First Statement ===
BM revealed the first teaser image for his debut solo single "Broken Me" through his Instagram account on April 29, 2021. He has stated that the song is a reflection of his internal struggles, sharing about how the track is about "fighting a war" with oneself. On June 30, DSP Media released a documentary video detailing the behind-the-scenes work of BM for his upcoming single album, The First Statement. BM then collaborated with AleXa when he featured in the music video of her single "Xtra", which was the title track of her album ReviveR released on July 1. The following day, BM released his debut single album The First Statement, with its lead single "13IVI". The First Statement is accompanied the deep house-inspired song "Body Movin'" and the Korean-language version of his debut single, "Broken Me", with BM penning the lyrics of all three tracks and also participating in the songwriting and composition for each song.

On January 21, 2022, BM released his new digital single "Lost in Euphoria".

On August 9, 2022, BM released his second single album Strangers, with its eponymous lead single. Strangers is accompanied the hip hop-inspired song "Bad Intentions", with BM penning the lyrics of all two tracks and also participating in the songwriting and composition for each song.

== Other ventures ==
BM went viral in March 2019 after responding to a fan's question during an Instagram Live regarding his preferred body part in working out, in which he humorously responded by referring to his chest area, eventually sparking a meme known as the "Big Tiddie Committee" after he acknowledged other male idols with a similar physique, such as Monsta X's Shownu, soloist Wonho, NU'EST's Baekho, Seventeen's Mingyu, Pentagon's Hongseok, The Rose's Woosung, among others. After meeting a fan during the Los Angeles stop of Kard's US tour in October 2019 who revealed that she was undergoing chemotherapy for breast cancer, BM began selling "Big Tiddie Gang" merchandise through his apparel brand Staydium, with a share of the proceeds going to breast cancer research and awareness. As of April 2020, BM and Staydium have donated $20,533.75 to the Breast Cancer Research Foundation.

Staydium launched another collaboration to raise funds for a non-profit organization in December 2020, the Healers X Staydium collection. Similar to the "Big Tiddie Gang" merchandise, part of the proceeds from this movement will go towards the non-profit organization #STOMPOUTBULLYING.

BM auditioned for Beef and landed the role of Woosh on the Netflix series. The character is said to be "a former tennis pro running the tennis shop at the country club."

== Discography ==
=== Extended plays ===
Title	Details
Element	Released: May 7, 2024; Label: DSP Media; Formats: Digital download, streaming; Track listing: 1. Embers; 2. Nectar (ft. Jay Park); 3. Loyalty; 4. Motion; 5. Badgirl Badboy (ft.Somin of KARD)
Po:Int	Released: October 20, 2025; Label: DSP Media; Formats: Digital download, streaming; Track listing: 1. Freak (ft. B.I); 2. Ooh; 3. View; 4. Move; 5. Stay Mad; 6. Freak (Inst.)

=== Single albums ===
Title	Details
The First Statement	Released: July 2, 2021; Label: DSP Media; Formats: Digital download, streaming; Track listing: 1. BROKEN ME (Korean Version); 2. 13IVI; 3. Body Movin
Strangers	Released: August 9, 2022; Label: DSP Media; Formats: Digital download, streaming; Track listing: 1. STRANGERS; 2. Bad Intentions
Lowkey	Released: December 7, 2023; Label: DSP Media; Formats: Digital download, streaming; Track listing: 1. Lowkey; 2. ATAP (After The After Party)

=== Singles ===
Title	Year	Peak chart positions	Album
Title	Year	KOR	Album
"Broken Me"	2021	—	The First Statement
"13IVI"	2021	—	The First Statement
"LIE (Lost In Euphoria)"	2022	—	Non-album single
"Strangers"	2022	—	Strangers
"Bad Intentions"	2022	—	Strangers
"Lowkey"	2023	—	Lowkey
"ATAP (After The After Party)"	2023	—	Lowkey
"Nectar" (Feat. Jay Park)	2024	—	Element
"Freak" (Feat. B.I)	2025	—	Po:Int

=== As collaborative artist ===
Title	Other(s) Artist(s)	Year	Peak chart positions	Album
Title	Other(s) Artist(s)	Year	KOR	Album
"Run It Up"	YUNGIN, Bobby of iKON	2024	—	Did You Know? Part 1

=== As featured artist ===
Title	Year	Peak chart positions	Album
Title	Year	KOR	Album
"I'm On My Wave" (Zesun ft. BM)	2016	—	I'm On My Wave
"Put It On Ya" (Jessi ft. BM, Nafla)	2020	—	Nuna

=== Composition credits ===
Year	Song	Album	Artist	Notes	Ref.
2017	"Oh NaNa"	Hola Hola	Kard	Co-written with Nassun and J.Seph	
2017	"Rumor"	Hola Hola	Kard	Co-written with Nassun	
2017	"Hola Hola"	Hola Hola	Kard	Co-written with Nassun, J.Seph, and Big Tone	
2017	"Living Good" (Special Thanks To)	Hola Hola	Kard	Co-written and co-composed with all Kard members; Co-arranged with LEEZ	
2017	"Into You"	You & Me	Kard	Co-written with Nassun and J.Seph	
2017	"Push & Pull"	You & Me	Kard	Co-written with Nassun and J.Seph	
2017	"Because" (지니까)	You & Me	Kard	Co-written with Nassun and J.Seph	
2017	"You in Me"	You & Me	Kard	Co-written with Nassun and J.Seph	
2017	"Trust Me" (BM & Somin version)	You & Me	Kard	Co-written with Nassun	
2017	"Trust Me" (Kard version)	You & Me	Kard	Co-written with Nassun and J.Seph	
2018	"Moonlight"	Ride on the Wind	Kard	Co-written with Nassun, GR8MOON, and J.Seph	
2018	"Ride On The Wind"	Ride on the Wind	Kard	Co-written with Nassun, GR8MOON, and J.Seph	
2018	"Knockin' On My Heaven's Door"	Ride on the Wind	Kard	Co-written with Nassun, GR8MOON, and J.Seph	
2018	"Dímelo"	Ride on the Wind	Kard	Co-written with Park Jung-wook, Kim Jun-yl, Nassun, and J.Seph	
2019	"Bomb Bomb"	Non-album single	Kard	Co-written with 24	
2019	"Dumb Litty"	Red Moon	Kard	Co-written with J.Seph and Versachoi; Co-composed with Versachoi	
2020	"Go Baby"	Red Moon	Kard	Co-written with J.Seph and Versachoi; Co-composed with Versachoi	
2020	"Red Moon"	Red Moon	Kard	Co-written with Kang Eun-jeong	
2020	"Enemy"	Red Moon	Kard	Co-written with Kang Eun-jeong and J.Seph	
2020	"Inferno"	Red Moon	Kard	Co-written with J.Seph and Versachoi; Co-composed with Versachoi	
2021	"Broken Me"	The First Statement	Himself	Co-composed with Isaac Han, GHOSTCHILD LTD, Aaron Kim	
2021	"13IVI"	The First Statement	Himself	Co-composed with Squar	
2021	"Body Movin'"	The First Statement	Himself	Co-composed with Isaac Han, Aaron Kim, GHOSTCHILD LTD	
2022	"Lost in Euphoria"	Non-album single	Himself	Co-composed with Isaac Han, GHOSTCHILD LTD, Yoo Young Lee	
2022	"Break Down"	Re:	Kard	Co-written with EJAE, J.seph, Jeon So-min, Jeon Ji-woo, Co-composed with EJAE, Isaac Han, Aaron Kim, GHOSTCHILD LTD	
2022	"Ring The Alarm"	Re:	Kard	Co-written with Benjmn, Cosmic Girl (RBW), J.seph	
2022	"Good Love"	Re:	Kard	Co-written with AVENUE 52	
2022	"Whip!"	Re:	Kard	Co-written with Minki Kim(RBW), Hyungyu Park, J.seph	
2022	"Strangers"	Strangers	Himself	Co-composed with Isaac Han, Aaron Kim, GHOSTCHILD LTD	
2022	"Bad Intentions"	Strangers	Himself	Co-composed with Isaac Han, GHOSTCHILD LTD	

== Filmography ==
=== Television shows ===
Year	Title	Role	Ref.
2011	K-Pop Star Season 1	Contestant	
2019	Law of the Jungle	Participant	
2026	Beef Season 2	Woosh	
