= Re: (EP) =

EP by Kard
- Released: June 22, 2022
- Genre: Dance
- Length: 18:03
- Language: Korean; English
- Label: DSP Media; Kakao

Kard chronology
| Way with Words (2020) | Re: (2022) |

Singles from Re:
- 1. "Ring The Alarm" Released: June 22, 2022

Re: is the fifth extended play (EP) by South Korean co-ed group Kard. It was released on June 22, 2022, by DSP Media. The EP consists of six tracks, including the lead single, "Ring The Alarm". This marks their first release in about two years since their first single album Way with Words and after J.Seph's return from the military.

== Background and release ==
DSP Media released a statement in May that "Kard are working on their new album after their break during J.Seph's military service". This was Kard's first group release in nearly two years, following their 2020 single album Way with Words. On May 27, a video titled Re:Member revealed that they will be releasing new music in June, after a hiatus of more than a year following J.Seph's mandatory military enlistment. Several interview films were also released and following a small trailer which recaps their journey, the album title was revealed to be Re:. The pre-sales for the EP on different online and physical stores began on June 9, following the album preview. Several teasers were also released, including a release scheduler, several concept images, a music video teaser which reached 1 million views before 24 hours of release, a dance spoiler, and a live highlight clip. The EP was released on June 22, 2022, through several music streaming services.

== Composition ==
The album consists of 6 tracks and they include "Break Down", a self composed track, the title track "Ring The Alarm", a moombahton track, "Good Love", a pop-R&B track, "Whip!" another pop-R&B track with a retro sound and instrumentals of the previous tracks "Break Down" and "Ring The Alarm".

== Promotion ==
A comeback showcase was also held introduce the extended play and communicate with their fans. Mnet and SBS announced that the quartet is set to perform on M Countdown and Inkigayo stages on the opening week of release.

== Commercial performance ==
On South Korean Hanteo Charts, the album recorded 7,895 copies and placed third on the daily charts for June 22, Wednesday, making it the best selling album on the first day of release, septupling since their last release Way with Words which sold a little more than 1000, while on Circle Chart, the album peaked at the twelfth position and sold over 26,800 physical copies, surpassing their previous EP Red Moon.

== Track listing ==
Re: track listing
| No. | Title | Lyrics | Music | Arrangement | Length |
|---|---|---|---|---|---|
| 1. | "Break Down" | Ejae; BM; Isaac Han; Aaron Kim; J. Seph; Somin; Jiwoo; Ghostchild | BM; Ejae; Aaron Kim; Isaac Han; Ghostchild | Isaac Han; Aaron Kim; Ghostchild | 2:54 |
| 2. | "Ring the Alarm" | Benjmn; Cosmic Girl; BM; J.Seph | Benjmn; Kim Do-Hoon; TM; TL | TL; TM; Benjmn | 3:05 |
| 3. | "Good Love" | Avenue 52; BM | Avenue 52; David Anthony Eames | Bangkok | 3:17 |
| 4. | "Whip!" | Minkey; BM; J.Seph; Park Hyun-kyu | Minkey; Park Hyun-kyu | Minkey | 2:48 |
| 5. | "Break Down" (instrumental) | | BM; Ejae; Aaron Kim; Isaac Han; Ghostchild | BM; Ejae; Aaron Kim; Isaac Han; Ghostchild | 2:54 |
| 6. | "Ring the Alarm" (instrumental) | | Benjmn; Kim Do-Hoon; TM; TL | TL; TM; Benjmn | 3:05 |
| Total length: | | | | | 18:03 |

== Charts ==
=== Weekly charts ===
Chart performance for Re:
| Chart (2022) | Peak position |
|---|---|
| South Korean Albums (Gaon) | 12 |

=== Monthly charts ===
Monthly chart performance for Re:
| Chart (2022) | Position |
|---|---|
| South Korean Albums (Circle) | 34 |

== Release history ==
Release history for Re:
| Region | Date | Format | Label |
|---|---|---|---|
| South Korea | June 22, 2022 | CD | DSP Media; Kakao |
| Various | June 22, 2022 | Digital download; streaming | DSP Media; Kakao |
