= Kard (group) =

South Korean co-ed music group

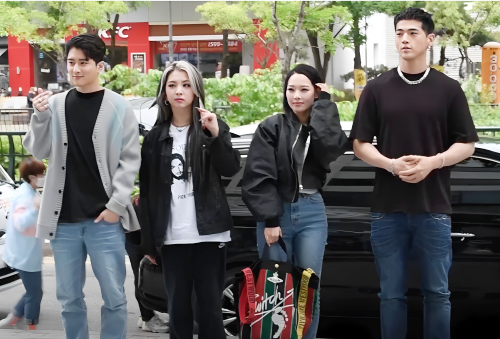
- Kard in May 2020; L–R: J.Seph, Jiwoo, Somin, and BM

Background information
- Also known as: K.A.R.D
- Origin: Seoul, South Korea
- Genres: K-pop; hip hop; EDM; Dancehall; tropical house
- Years active: 2016–2026
- Label: DSP
- Members: J.Seph; BM; Somin; Jiwoo
- Website: kard-official.com

Kard (Korean: 카드, stylized in all caps) is a South Korean co-ed group formed by DSP Media. The group consists of four members: J.Seph, BM, Somin, and Jiwoo. They officially debuted on July 19, 2017, with their extended play Hola Hola.

== History ==
=== Pre-debut ===
Somin debuted in DSP Media's Japanese girl group Puretty in 2012 which later disbanded in 2014. She later joined Kara Project where she competed to become a new member of Kara and finished in second place. In 2015, she debuted as the leader of DSP Media's girl group April but she decided to depart from the group on November 9.

J.Seph trained for five years and BM trained for four and a half under DSP Media with an original plan to debut as a hip-hop duo. Before his debut, BM was featured in Goo Ha-ra's song "La La La" from her 2015 debut EP Alohara (Can You Feel It?) and was also her dance partner for the music video and live performances of its lead single "Choco Chip Cookies".

Jiwoo trained under FNC Entertainment for two years and moved to DSP Media in 2016.

=== 2016–2017: Project singles ===
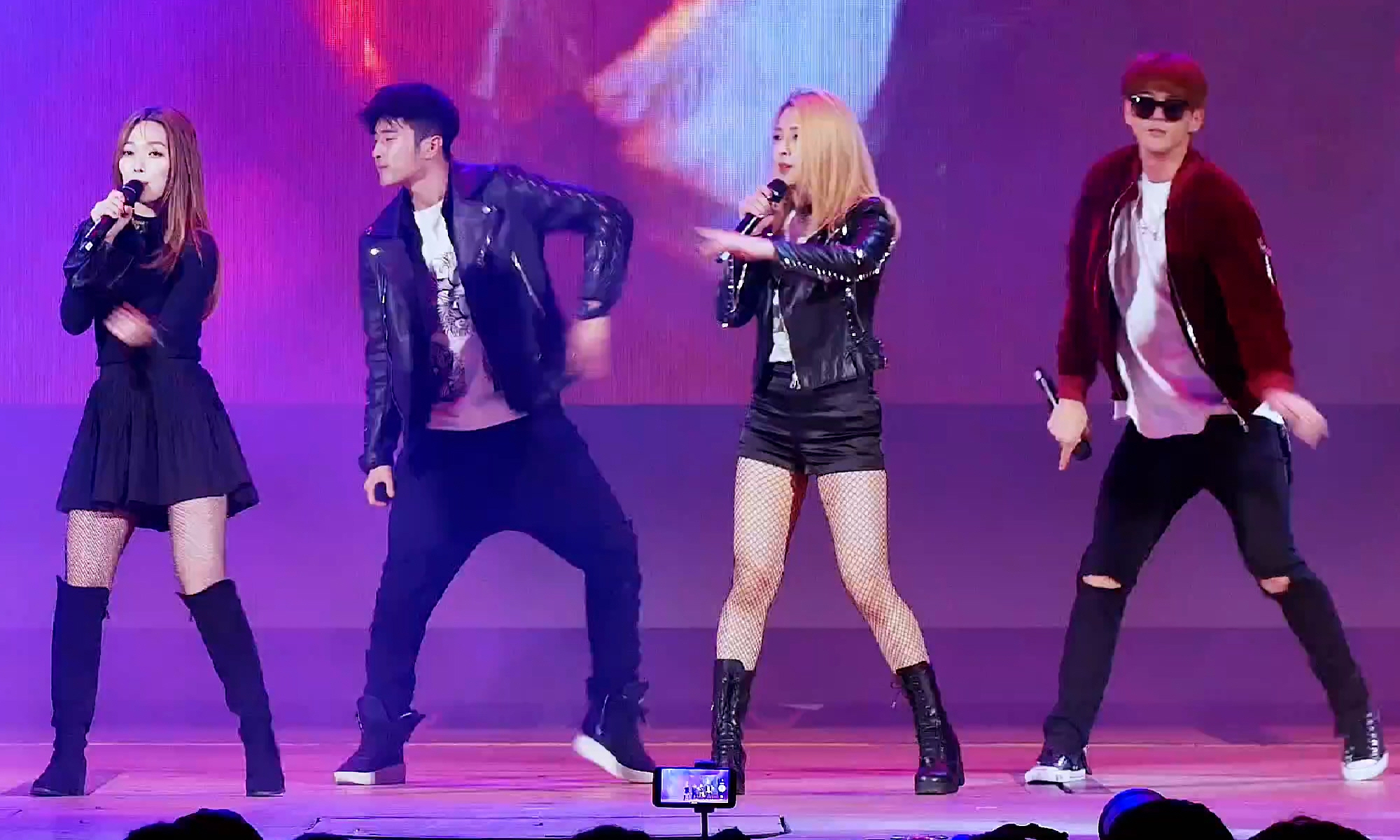
Kard performing "Oh Nana" in 2017

DSP Media first announced the formation of Kard on December 1, 2016, after opening several social media accounts under the group's name. After being revealed in a sequential order, all the members were revealed by December 5, with the label elaborating more on their card-game concept. The group's name is an abbreviation of different "cards" that are assigned to each member: BM is assigned as the "King" card, J.Seph is known as the "Ace" card, Somin is given the "Black JokeR" card, while member Jiwoo is referred to as the "Color JokeR" card. A certain "hiDDen card" was also stated by the agency, but it was not elaborated further in its statement. Then, DSP Media confirmed that the group's first release was slated for December 13.

On December 8, Kard revealed that their first "hiDDen card" member would be their labelmate Hur Young-ji, and further elaborated that Youngji would be active only in the first release of the group's "Kard Project", wherein they will release three project singles each with their own "hidden card" feature before their official debut. The announcement was made by the group's four members including Youngji in a live broadcast on the V-Live app. The following day, the music video teaser for their first project single titled "Oh NaNa" was released.

"Oh NaNa" was released on December 13. The music video for the song accumulated over 1.25 million views in three days. Following the release of the song, Billboard magazine included Kard in its list of "10 Best New K-pop Groups in 2016" ranking at number 8, with the group making it into the list just eight days after starting their pre-debut project. "Oh NaNa" then became the group's first entry into the Billboard World Digital Song Sales chart, with the song peaking at number 5 in its issue dated January 7, 2017 and remaining on the said chart for 8 weeks.

On January 19, 2017, Billboard selected Kard as one of the "Top 5 K-Pop Artists to Watch in 2017", citing the group's mixed-gender setup and their international attention which was seen when the music video for "Oh NaNa" became one of the top-viewed video in the United States for December.

On February 16, Kard released their second project single titled "Don't Recall", at number 22 on the UK Singles Chart, and at number 34th on the Brazilian Song Chart. Six days after the song's release, the music video for "Don't Recall" had accumulated over 6 million views. Similar to its predecessor, "Don't Recall" charted on Billboard's World Digital Song Sales chart and peaked at number 5 in its issue dated March 18, 2017, but remained on the chart longer, charting for 12 weeks. An English version of the song was released by the group on March 1, which marked the group's second "hidden card" release.

On April 21, LG Electronics announced that it has selected the group as their global ambassador for the G6 Smartphone. Following this development, it was revealed that all content for Kard's final project single titled "Rumor", including its music videos, will be produced in collaboration with LG Electronics G6. "Rumor" was then released on April 24, with the song's music video featuring Korean choreographer Z.Sun as the group's third "hidden card" member.

The group then embarked on their first concert tour, known as the 2017 Wild Kard Tour, held in 11 cities covering Canada, the United States, Mexico, and Brazil from May to June 2017. It was reported that all tickets for the concert tour were sold out. In the midst of the group's tour, Kard was featured in their first solo reality series titled "Secret Kard", which depicted the group's experiences during their "Wild Kard" concert tour. The series first premiered on Mnet's M2 YouTube channel on June 19.

=== 2017–2018: Debut and touring ===
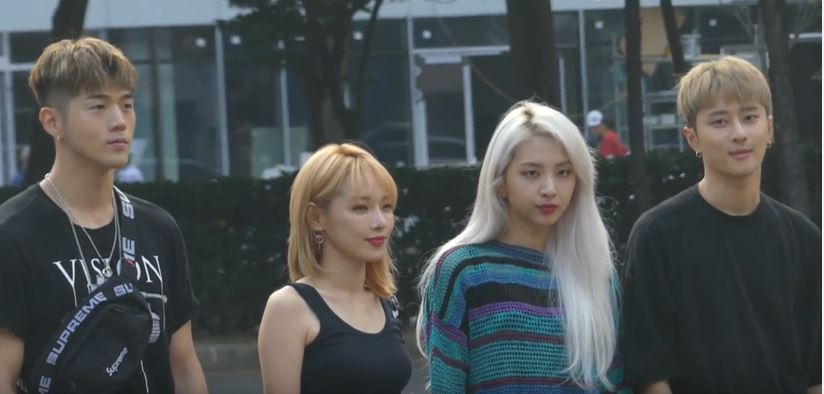
Kard in 2018

Kard made their official debut on July 19, 2017, through the release of their first EP Hola Hola. The six-track EP contained their previous project singles, as well as the title track "Hola Hola". The group held their debut showcase at the Ilji Art Hall in Gangnam-gu, Seoul. The album debuted on several Billboard charts, charting at number 3 on World Albums, at number 25 on Heatseekers Albums, and at number 46 on the Independent Album Chart. The album's eponymous title track also entered the Billboard World Digital Song Sales chart at number 4, while other tracks of the album, "I Can’t Stop" and "Living Good" ranked number 10 and number 12, respectively.

On August 19, Kard performed at the 2017 Summer Sonic Festival, known as one of the world's largest rock festivals, held in Japan. On the next day, the group performed at the second day of the 2017 KCON Festival held at the Staples Center in Los Angeles. Following their performance at KCON, the group then embarked on their second concert tour known as the "2017 Wild Kard Tour PT. 2" which was held from September to October 2017, with five European dates in London, Lisbon, Madrid, Milan, and Rotterdam, and five North American dates in Minneapolis; Washington, D.C.; New York City; Miami; and San Francisco.

The group released their second EP, You & Me, on November 21, with the song "You In Me" serving as the title track. You & Me debuted at number 8 on the Gaon Album Chart on the chart issue dated November 19–25, 2017, and also debuted at number 4 on the US World albums Chart and at number 17 on the US Heatseekers Albums chart, achieving their new peak as a group on the latter chart.

The female members of the group, Somin and Jiwoo, were featured in a special version of the song "Lo Siento", the lead single of Super Junior's album Replay (a repackaged album of their eighth Korean studio album Play). This version is included in the digital version of the album, with the album to be released on April 12, 2018. Somin and Jiwoo joined Super Junior to perform the song on various Korean music programs. Kard then held an Asia-wide tour spanning four countries: Singapore, Taiwan, Hong Kong and the Philippines. Kard also performed at the South By Southwest (SXSW) 2018.

On April 14, 2018, the group met local fans through their 2018 Wild Kard Tour in the Kasablanka Hall in Jakarta, Indonesia. Two meetings were then held in Australia in the city of Melbourne on April 26 and Sydney on the 29th. On July 25, 2018, they made their comeback with their third EP, Ride On the Wind. The EP debuted and peaked at number 7 on the Gaon Album Chart for the week ending July 28, 2018. The EP also debuted and peaked at number 8 on the Billboard World Albums chart.

On August 19, Kard held their first solo concert in South Korea since their debut, completing their "Wild Kard in Seoul" concert held at the YES24 Live Hall in Gwangjin-gu, Seoul.

=== 2019–2021: Red Moon and Way with Words ===
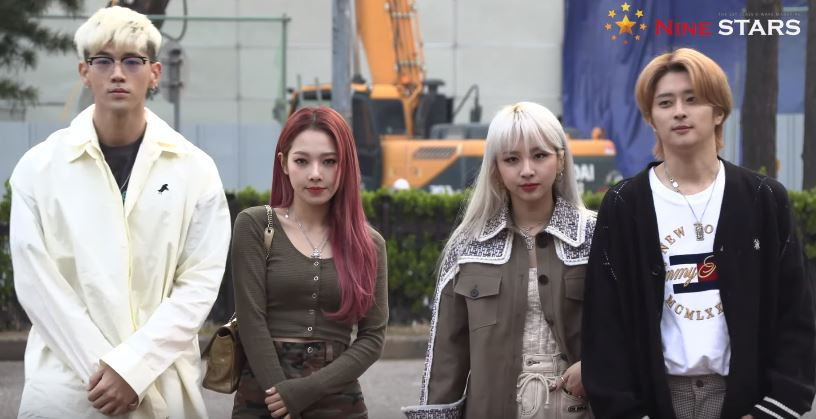
Kard in 2019

On March 27, 2019, they made their comeback with their first digital single "Bomb Bomb". "Bomb Bomb" became the group's fifth top five entry on the Billboard World Digital Song Sales chart, debuting and peaking at number three. A month later, Kard held their second concert in Seoul named as the "2019 Wild Kard in Seoul" at the Mary Hall of Sogang University in Mapo-gu, Seoul on April 27. The following month, Kard performed at the 2019 Dream Concert held at the World Cup Stadium in Sangam-dong, Seoul on May 18.

On July 12 and 14, Kard embarked on their Indian two-city tour known as the "Play Your Kard Right Tour", with the band performing at Delhi's Talkatora Indoor Stadium and at the city of Guwahati.

On September 21, Kard made another comeback with their second digital single, "Dumb Litty". Following the success of the single which peaked at number three on the Billboard World Digital Song Sales chart, Kard debuted on the Billboard Social 50 chart, ranking at number 41 on its tally dated on October 5 as they experienced a 39% increase in Twitter mentions and a 457% increase in YouTube subscribers.

Throughout the month of October, Kard embarked on their "Wild Kard Tour in USA 2019" with five concert dates held in different cities in the United States. The tour wrapped up on October 27 at the Buckhead Theatre in Atlanta. The following month, on November 6, Kard appeared at the Young Hollywood studio in Los Angeles, talking about their comeback song "Dumb Litty", and playing the Mystery Box Challenge game.

On February 12, 2020, Kard released their fourth EP, Red Moon. The EP debuted and peaked at number 10 on the Gaon Album Chart for the week ending February 15, after reporting 1,453 copies sold, before reporting a total of 1,752 copies sold in its first two weeks. Additionally, its eponymous title track reached a peak position of number 8 on the Billboard World Digital Song Sales Chart.

On August 26, 2020, Kard released their first single album Way with Words and their title track "Gunshot". BM wrote, composed, and arranged the title track, with the other members contributing to the album as well. "Gunshot" reached a peak position of number 9 on the Billboard World Digital Song Sales Chart on September 12, and spent a total of three weeks on the chart.

On October 5, J.Seph quietly enlisted for his mandatory military service as an active duty soldier. Kard then continued promoting as a three-piece group, making their first live performance without J.Seph on the second season of KCON's online series KCON:TACT held on October 16–25. BM debuted as the group's first soloist in 2021, releasing his single album The First Statement on July 2.

=== 2022–present: Return with Re:, Where to Now?, and disbandment notice ===
On January 21, 2022, BM released his first solo comeback with the single "Lost in Euphoria."

On April 4, 2022, it was confirmed that J.Seph has been discharged from his military service. However, due to the spread of COVID-19, J.Seph's last vacation was in mid-February, where he did not return to military service and was discharged early.

On May 28, 2022, DSP Media announced that Kard would release a new album in June and resume all activities, marking their first full group release in 22 months. Their fifth EP, Re:, was released on June 22 with the title track "Ring the Alarm".

On July 7, 2022, DSP Media announced that Kard has renewed their contracts with them for three more years.

On March 23, 2023, it was confirmed that Kard would be making their comeback in April 2023 and had recently finished filming their new music video. On August 13, 2024, the group released their seventh mini-album Where to Now? (Pt. 1: Yellow Light).

On June 9, 2025, the group announced that their 8th mini-album, Drift will be released on July 2.

On July 5, 2026, it was announced that Kard would be disbanding following the release of their first studio album Where to Now? (Part.2): Nowhere on July 28, followed by a world tour.

On July 6, 2026, it was announced by the agency that the group will finalize their activities after releasing Where to Now? (Part.2): Nowhere and completing their world tour, concluding their nine-year journey. The group decided not to renew their contracts with DSP again, as their updated agreements were set to expire that year. In a statement to Korea JoongAng Daily, they said they viewed disbandment as a pause, and Somin added that many groups have disbanded and later reunited, which could also happen to them.

== Artistry ==
Kard's brand of K-pop has been described as "undeniably trendy", with their discography focusing on contemporary house and dancehall vibes, which Billboard has referred to as something that is "pulled directly from Top 40 charts". The group's musical style diverges from electropop, hip hop, EDM, and alt-R&B that was known to have been trending in the American music market by the time of their pre-debut. The group was also noted for their reggaetón and moombahton styling that resonated with international K-pop fans, which was stated by Billboard to be one of the primary reasons why they were able to tour throughout North and South America even before releasing their first mini-album. While they are largely inspired by Latin dance music trends, Kard has stated that they are continuously studying other genres to keep showing new sides to their music style. A notable shift in Kard's sonic style was first seen through the release of their single "Dumb Litty", which incorporated dancehall alongside synth, trap, and EDM. Following the release of their fourth EP, Red Moon, member BM has dubbed moombahton as "a symbol of Kard".

The group's nature in their sonic base is apparent in the members' personal musical influences: BM cites American rapper Tupac and J.Cole as his inspiration, J.Seph cites Korean rapper Beenzino, Somin takes inspiration from Tinashe and Ariana Grande, while member Jiwoo cites Beyoncé and Rihanna.

== Public image and reception ==
Mixed-gender groups are considered a rarity in the Korean music industry, with several co-ed acts like Play the Siren, Sunny Hill, and Co-Ed being regarded as unsuccessful. With Kard's debut, Forbes noted that the group was "headed for worldwide success" after quickly building an international presence through their North and South American tour in their pre-debut, which was further expanded following the release of Hola Hola. Billboard magazine has described Kard to be "one of the most successful co-ed K-pop acts to ever exist" which was seen when their debut EP landed at number 3 on the World Albums Chart.

While Kard has risen to international success, especially in South America, they have been criticized for focusing primarily on the international music market. Due to their lack of promotions in their country of origin, a Korean broadcasting station official once told the members of Kard that they were "like a fictional group [to him]". However, the group has stated that they are aiming for further activities in South Korea.

== Members ==
- J.Seph (제이셉)
- BM (비엠)
- Somin (소민)
- Jiwoo (지우)

== Discography ==
=== Studio albums ===
List of studio albums, with selected chart positions and sales
Title	Details	Peak chart positions	Sales
Title	Details	KOR	Sales
Where to Now? (Pt. 2): Nowhere	Released: July 28, 2026; Label: DSP Media; Formats: CD, digital download	16	KOR: 6,000

=== Extended plays ===
List of extended plays, with selected chart positions and sales
Title	Details	Peak chart positions				Sales
Title	Details	KOR	FRA Down	US Heat	US World	Sales
Hola Hola	Released: July 19, 2017; Label: DSP Media; Formats: CD, digital download	2	171	25	3	KOR: 18,343
You & Me	Released: November 21, 2017; Label: DSP Media; Formats: CD, digital download	8	170	17	4	KOR: 12,775
Ride on the Wind	Released: July 25, 2018; Label: DSP Media; Formats: CD, digital download	7	—	—	8	KOR: 7,681
Red Moon	Released: February 12, 2020; Label: DSP Media; Formats: CD, digital download	10	—N/a	—	—	KOR: 6,520
Re:	Released: June 22, 2022; Label: DSP Media; Formats: CD, digital download	12	—N/a	—	—	KOR: 26,813
Icky	Released: May 23, 2023; Label: DSP Media; Formats: CD, digital download	24	—N/a	—	—	KOR: 13,199
Where to Now? (Pt. 1: Yellow Light)	Released: August 13, 2024; Label: DSP Media; Formats: CD, digital download	17	—N/a	—	—	KOR: 6,286
Drift	Released: July 2, 2025; Label: DSP Media; Formats: Digital download	—	—N/a	—	—	
"—" denotes releases that did not chart or were not released in that region.

=== Single albums ===
List of single albums, with selected chart positions and sales
Title	Details	Peak chart positions	Sales
Title	Details	KOR	Sales
Way with Words	Released: August 26, 2020; Label: DSP Media; Formats: CD, digital download	12	KOR: 11,474

=== Singles ===
List of singles, with selected chart positions, showing year released and album name
Title	Year	Peak chart positions			Sales	Album
Title	Year	KOR	FIN Down	US World	Sales	Album
"Oh NaNa" (feat. Hur Young-ji)	2016	—	—	5	—N/a	Hola Hola
"Don't Recall"	2017	—	18	5	—N/a	Hola Hola
"Rumor"	2017	—	—	3	US: 3,000	Hola Hola
"Hola Hola"	2017	76	—	4	KOR: 28,983	Hola Hola
"You in Me"	2017	— (Note: "You in Me" did not enter the Gaon Digital Chart, but appeared at number 98 on the Download component chart.)	—	11	KOR: 12,962	You & Me
"Ride on the Wind"	2018	— (Note: "Ride On the Wind" did not enter the Gaon Digital Chart, but appeared at number 92 on the Download component chart.)	—	19	—N/a	Ride on the Wind
"Bomb Bomb"	2019	—	—	3	—N/a	Non-album single
"Dumb Litty"	2019	—	—	3	—N/a	Red Moon
"Red Moon"	2020	—	—	8	—N/a	Red Moon
"Gunshot"	2020	—	—	9	—N/a	Way with Words
"Ring the Alarm"	2022	— (Note: "Ring the Alarm" did not enter the Gaon Digital Chart, but appeared at number 37 on the Download component chart.)	—	—	—N/a	Re:
"Oh NaNa" (Aster Remix)	2023	—	—	—	—N/a	Kard Remix Project
"Ring the Alarm" (Jeride Remix)	2023	—	—	—	—N/a	Kard Remix Project
"Without You"	2023	— (Note: "Without You" did not enter the Circle Digital Chart, but peaked at number 70 on the Circle Download Chart.)	—	—	—N/a	Icky
"Icky"	2023	— (Note: "Icky" did not enter the Circle Digital Chart, but peaked at number 117 on the Circle Download Chart.)	—	15	—N/a	Icky
"Fireworks"	2023	— (Note: "Fireworks" did not enter the Circle Digital Chart, but peaked at number 172 on the Circle Download Chart.)	—	—	—N/a	Non-album single
"Tell My Momma"	2024	— (Note: "Tell My Momma" did not enter the Circle Digital Chart, but peaked at number 45 on the Circle Download Chart.)	—	—	—N/a	Where To Now? (Part 1. Yellow Light)
"Detox"	2024	— (Note: "Detox" did not enter the Circle Digital Chart, but peaked at number 143 on the Circle Download Chart.)	—	—	—N/a	Non-album single
"Touch"	2025	— (Note: "Touch" did not enter the Circle Digital Chart, but peaked at number 59 on the Circle Download Chart.)	—	—	—N/a	Drift
"Back To Life"	2026	— (Note: "Back To Life" did not enter the Circle Digital Chart, but appeared at number 44 on the Circle Download Chart.)	—	—	—N/a	Where To Now? (Part 2. Nowhere)
"—" denotes releases that did not chart or were not released in that region.

=== Other charted songs ===
Title	Year	Peak chart positions	Album
Title	Year	US World	Album
"I Can't Stop"	2017	10	Hola Hola
"Living Good" (Special thanks to)	2017	12	Hola Hola
"Ah Ee Yah" (ㅏㅣㅑ)	2020	20	Way with Words
"Hold On"	2020	24	Way with Words

=== Soundtrack appearances ===
Title	Year	Album
"Here We Now" (이제 우리)	2017	Newlywed Diary 2 OST
"Wingless Angel" (날개 잃은 천사)	2018	Immortal Songs: Singing the Legend (Lyricist Lee Kun-woo)

=== Album participations ===
Title	Year	Album
"Lo Siento" (Super Junior feat. Kard)	2018	Replay

== Concerts ==
Headlining tours

- Wild Kard Tour (2017–2019)

2017
Date	City	Country	Venue
July 1	São Paulo	Brazil	Tropical Butantã
September 1	London	England	ULU Live
September 3	Lisbon	Portugal	Sala Time Out
September 5	Madrid	Spain	Sala But
September 8	Milan	Italy	Magazzini Generali
September 10	Rotterdam	The Netherlands	Annabel
September 15	Minneapolis	United States	State Theatre
September 17	Washington D.C.	United States	Warner Theatre
September 20	New York City	United States	PlayStation Theater
September 22	Miami	United States	James L. Knight Center
September 27	Valparaiso	Chile	Teatro Municipal
September 29	Concepcion	Chile	Gimnasio Municipal
October 1	La Serena	Chile	Coliseo Municipal
October 4	Buenos Aires	Argentina	Teatro Vorterix
October 6	Lima	Peru	Jockey Club
October 8	San Francisco	United States	The Warfield
2018
Date	City	Country	Venue
January 19	Bangkok	Thailand	Moonstar Studio 1
January 21	Singapore	Singapore	Zepp @ Big Box
February 2	Taipei	Taiwan	ATT Show Box
February 4	Hong Kong	China	KITEC Rottunda 3
February 9	Manila	Philippines	KIA Theatre
April 26	Melbourne	Australia	Melbourne Convention and Exhibition Centre
April 29	Sydney	Australia	UNSW Roundhouse
September 8	Mexico City	Mexico	Auditorio BB
September 11	Bogotá	Colombia	Royal Center
September 13	Santiago	Chile	Teatro Coliseo
September 15	Buenos Aires	Argentina	El Teatro de Flores
September 21	Rio de Janeiro	Brazil	Vivo Rio
September 30	São Paulo	Brazil	Espaço das Américas
2019
Date	City	Country	Venue
April 27	Seoul	South Korea	Mary Hall of Sogang University
October 4	Monterrey	Mexico	Escena
October 6	Guadalajara	Mexico	C3 Stage
October 8	Santiago	Chile	Teatro Coliseo
October 10	Río de Janeiro	Brazil	Vivo Rio
October 11	São Paulo	Brazil	Tom Brasil
October 13	Recife	Brazil	Baile Perfumado
October 15	Porto Alegre	Brazil	Bar Opinião
October 18	Los Angeles	United States	La Mirada Theatre
October 20	Philadelphia	United States	Theater of Living Arts
October 23	Houston	United States	Cullen Performance Hall
October 25	Chicago	United States	Patio Theater
October 27	Atlanta	United States	Buckhead Theatre

- Play Your Kard Right Tour (2019)
- Wild Kard In Brazil, Mexico, Chile, Colombia & USA (2022)
- Playground World Tour (2023–2024)
- Where To Now? Tour (2024–2025)
- Drift World Tour (2025–2026)

Date	City	Country	Venue
2025
July 19	Seoul	South Korea	Yes24 Wanderloch Hall
September 28	Bangkok	Thailand	Lido Connect 3
November 19	Brisbane	Australia	The Triffid
November 20	Melbourne	Australia	170 Russell
November 23	Sydney	Australia	Metro Theatre
December 10	Los Angeles	United States	Orpheum Theatre
December 12	Chicago	United States	Copernicus Center
December 14	New York City	United States	Webster Hall
December 16	San Juan	Puerto Rico	Coca-Cola Music Hall
December 18	Atlanta	United States	Buckhead Theatre
December 20	Dallas	United States	House of Blues
2026
February 21	Taipei	Taiwan	Taipei International Convention Center
June 27	Jakarta	Indonesia	Basket Hall GBK Senayan Jakarta
July 4	Tokyo	Japan	HIKOSEN Theater

- Now Here World Tour (2026)

Date	City	Country	Venue
August 8	Seoul	South Korea	Gavin Art Hall
September 1	Berlin	Germany	Huxleys
September 2	Frankfurt	Germany	Batschikapp
September 4	Brussels	Belgium	La Madeleine
September 6	Lisbon	Portugal	LAV (Lisboa Ao Vivo)
September 9	Barcelona	Spain	Razzmatazz
September 10	Madrid	Spain	Wagon
September 12	Paris	France	Folies Berger
September 13	London	UK	Shepherd’s Bush Empire
September 15	Sofia	Bulgaria	Park Centre Yunak
September 17	Athens	Greece	Universe Multivenue
September 27	Singapore		Sands Theatre
November 29	São Paulo	Brazil	Audio Club

== Videography ==
=== Music videos ===
Year	Title	Director	Ref.
2016	"Oh NaNa"	Insp, Suiko (Koinrush)	
2017	"Don't Recall"	Insp, Suiko (Koinrush)	
2017	"Don't Recall" Hidden ver.	Insp, Suiko (Koinrush)	
2017	"Rumor"	Insp, Suiko (Koinrush)	
2017	"Rumor" Hidden ver.	Insp, Suiko (Koinrush)	
2017	"Hola Hola"	Insp, Suiko (Koinrush)	
2017	"You In Me"	Kim Young-jo & Yoo Seung-woo	
2017	"Trust Me"	Kim Young-jo & Yoo Seung-woo	
2018	"Ride on the Wind"	Kim Young-jo & Yoo Seung-woo	
2018	"Ride on the Wind" Choreography ver.	Kim Young-jo & Yoo Seung-woo	
2018	"Knockin' on My Heaven's Door"; Choreography ver.	Unknown	
2019	"Bomb Bomb"	Hong Wonki (Zanybros)	
2019	"Bomb Bomb" Performance ver.	Unknown	
2019	"Dumb Litty"	Hong Wonki (Zanybros)	
2019	"Dumb Litty" Performance ver. (Black ver.)	Unknown	
2019	"Dumb Litty" Performance ver. (White ver.)	Unknown	
2019	"[prod.BM] BM - Habanero"	Unknown	
2019	"[prod.BM] BM, J.seph - Inferno"	Unknown	
2019	"[prod.BM/Lyric Video] Somin - Backseat (Feat. BM)"	Unknown	
2020	"Red Moon"	Hong Wonki (Zanybros)	
2020	"Red Moon" Performance ver.	Unknown	
2020	"Enemy" Choreography ver.	Unknown	
2020	"Go Baby" Choreography ver.	Unknown	
2020	"Gunshot"	Unknown	
2020	"Gunshot" Performance ver.	Unknown	
2022	"Ring the Alarm"	Unknown	
2022	"Ring the Alarm" Performance ver.	Unknown	
2023	"Without You"	Unknown	
2023	"ICKY"	Unknown	
2024	"Tell My Momma"	Unknown	
2024	"Tell My Momma" Performance ver.	Unknown	
2024	"Tell My Momma"〈Muvie Theater〉 Full ver.	Unknown	
2024	"Spin" Performance ver.	Unknown	
2025	"Touch"	Unknown	
2025	"Touch" Performance ver.	Unknown	

== Awards and nominations ==
Name of the award ceremony, year presented, nominee(s) of the award, award category, and the result of the nomination
Award ceremony	Year	Category	Nominee/work	Result	Ref.
Asia Artist Awards	2017	Rookie of the Year Award – Music	Kard	Won	
Asia Artist Awards	2018	New Wave Award – Music	Kard	Won	
Asia Artist Awards	2022	Best Choice Award – Music	Kard	Won	
Asia Artist Awards	2023	Best Musician Award	Kard	Won	
CJ E&M America Awards	2017	Hottest Rookie	Kard	Won	
Melon Music Awards	2017	Best New Artist	Kard	Nominated	
Seoul Music Awards	2018	New Artist Award	Kard	Nominated	
Seoul Music Awards	2018	Popularity Award	Kard	Nominated	
Seoul Music Awards	2018	Hallyu Special Award	Kard	Nominated	
K Global Heart Dream Awards	2023	K Global Best Co-Ed Group Award	Kard	Won	
Korea-China Management Awards	2019	Asia Rising Star Award	Kard	Won	
Korea First Brand Awards	2020	Top Co-ed Idol	Kard	Won	
MTV Europe Music Awards	2020	Best Korean Artist	Kard	Nominated	
