= Jeon Ji-woo =

South Korean singer and rapper (born 1996)

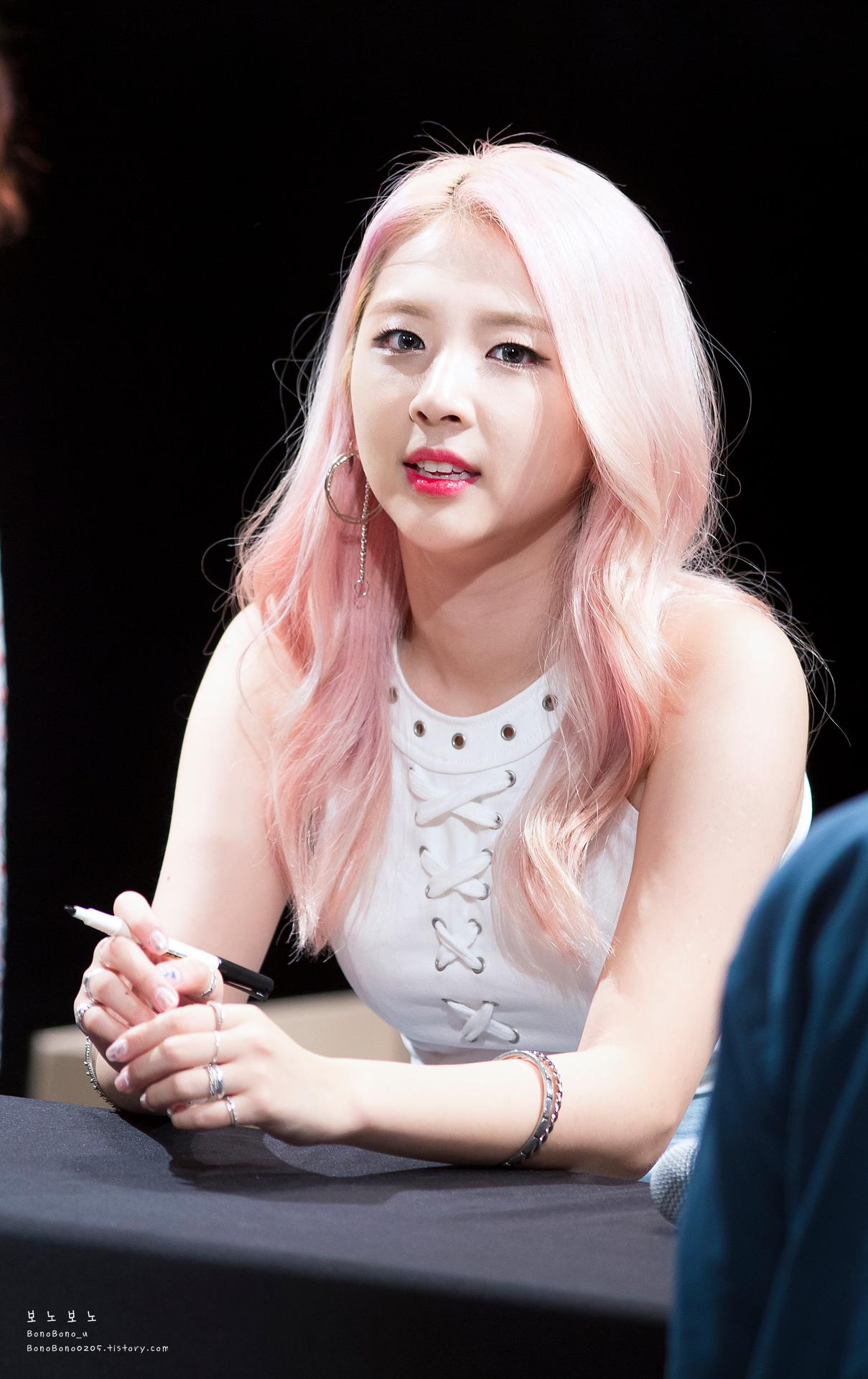
- Jeon in 2017
- Born: October 4, 1996 (age 30); South Korea
- Occupations: Singer; rapper; songwriter
- Musical career
- Genres: K-pop; hip-hop
- Instrument: Vocals
- Years active: 2016–present
- Label: DSP
- Member of: Kard

Korean name
- Hangul: 전지우
- RR: Jeon Jiu
- MR: Chŏn Chiu

Jeon Ji-woo (Korean: 전지우; born October 4, 1996), known by her stage name Jiwoo (지우), is a South Korean singer, rapper and songwriter signed under DSP Media. She is best known as a member of the co-ed group Kard. Jiwoo made her solo debut with the EP (EX)IST, released on February 11, 2026.

== Career ==
=== Pre-debut activities ===
She trained for two years at FNC Entertainment and moved to DSP Media in 2016.

=== 2016–2025: Debut with Kard ===
Jiwoo was revealed as a member of DSP Media's upcoming co-ed group Kard on December 1, 2016, alongside bandmates BM, J.Seph, and Somin. In the group's card-themed concept, she represents the "Color Joker" card. Kard officially debuted on July 19, 2017, with their first EP Hola Hola.

In 2020, Jiwoo appeared as a cast member on the Mnet hip hop competition program Good Girl, alongside artists including Hyoyeon, Cheetah, Ailee, and Lee Young-ji. A review of the show's premiere described the cast as drawing from "established or emerging musicians from across different musical genres", with Jiwoo grouped among the show's "underground rappers" representation from the K-pop sphere.

In December 2021, Jiwoo was announced as part of the lineup for Watcha's music variety show Double Trouble, alongside performers including Lim Seul-ong, Minzy, Choa, and Hyolyn. At the program's press conference, the cast noted that opportunities to perform on stage had been greatly reduced amid the COVID-19 pandemic, and that the show offered a chance to "quench their thirst for stage performances".

In August 2024, Kard released its seventh EP, Where to Now? (Part 1: Yellow Light). Speaking about the group's touring schedule following the release, Jiwoo said: "Our schedule for the second half of this year is already full with tours in the US and Germany. Next year, we will be visiting Latin America".

=== 2026–present: Solo debut with (EX)IST ===
On January 31, 2026, it was announced that Jiwoo would make her solo debut with her first EP, (EX)IST, which was finally released on February 11, 2026. Kard bandmate BM contributed to the production of two of the EP's tracks, "Mutual" and "Dang Dong". Jiwoo solidified her identity as a solo artist on the release by integrating both rap and vocal performance across the EP's five tracks.

Speaking ahead of the EP's release, Jiwoo described the experience of working on her first solo project as both exciting and unfamiliar, noting that the process of presenting herself as a solo artist held great personal significance. She also discussed her songwriting contribution to the track "Lily", explaining that the song was conceived as a message of comfort for moments of self-doubt and loneliness.

== Discography ==
=== Extended plays ===
Title	Album details
(EX)IST	Released: February 11, 2026; Label: DSP Media; Formats: Digital download, streaming; Track listing: 1. "Home Sweet Home"; 2. "Mutual"; 3. "Dang Dong" (feat. BM); 4. "Lily"

=== Singles ===
Title	Year	Peak chart positions	Album
Title	Year	KOR	Album
"Home Sweet Home"	2026	—	(EX)IST
"Mutual"	2026	—	(EX)IST
"Dang Dong" (feat. BM)	2026	—	(EX)IST
"Lily"	2026	—	(EX)IST
"—" denotes releases that did not chart or were not released in that region.

=== Composition credits ===
Year	Song	Album	Artist	Notes	Ref.
2017	"Living Good" (Special Thanks To)	Hola Hola	Kard	Co-written and co-composed with all Kard members	
2026	"Lily"	(EX)IST	Herself		

== Filmography ==
=== Television shows ===
Year	Title	Role	Notes	Ref.
2020	Good Girl	Cast member	Mnet's hip hop competition programme	
2021–2022	Double Trouble	Cast member	Watcha music variety show	
