= Ring the Alarm (Kard song) =

2022 song by South Korean group Kard

Single by Kard

from the EP Re:
- Released: June 22, 2022
- Genre: K-pop; Moombahton
- Length: 3:05
- Label: DSP Media
- Songwriter(s): BENJMN; Cosmic Girl; BM; J. Seph
- Producer(s): BENJMN; Kim Do-Hoon; Lee Hyeon Seung; TM

Kard singles chronology
"Gunshot" (2020)	"Ring the Alarm" (2022)

"Ring the Alarm" is a song by South Korean co-ed group Kard, released as the title track from their fifth extended play, Re: (2022). It was released by DSP Media and distributed by Kakao Entertainment in conjunction with the EP on June 22, 2022. The song was written by BENJMN, Cosmic Girl, BM and J. Seph while BENJMN, Kim Do-Hoon, Lee Hyeon Seung and TM produced the song. "Ring the Alarm" is an Moombahton song with elements of K-pop. Lyrically, the song mainly consists of Kard's comeback after a two-year hiatus. An official music video for the song was released on June 22, 2022.

== Background and release ==
This was their single since reuniting as a full group after J.Seph was discharged from the military in April. The lyrics of the song made reference to this comeback as a group after almost two years. The song was released in conjunction with the EP on June 22, 2022, through several music portals, including MelOn, Spotify, Apple Music and iTunes.

== Composition ==
The title track, 'Ring The Alarm,' is a moombahton song featuring domestic producers Kim Do-hoon, who is well known for producing RBW groups, and Lee Hyun-seung. The song is written in the key of E minor and has a tempo of 100 beats per minute. The mood of 'Let's have fun in this new time' is conveyed by a rhythmic bass sound as well as a synthesizer and guitar sound with a summer vibe.

== Music video ==
On June 19, 2020, Kard released an 18-second long teaser clip of the music video for "Ring the Alarm"; a dance spoiler video was release a day later on June 21; the music video was released three days later on June 22. The three videos were released on the group's official YouTube channel. It garnered 3.77 million views in its first 24 hours, marking a personal best for the group. The video reached 10 million views 2 days after it was released.

The vibrant visual depicts each member performing the song in a different location: Somin in a living room with several aquariums, BM in a gas station, J.Seph in a white living room, and Jiwoo at a fast-food stand. In the chorus, the band declares, "Ring the alarm / Come here and get on the ride quickly / (What you want, what you need, I'll deliver) / Follow the body signal, move it / You'll be mesmerized." Later in the video, the group is seen performing high-energy choreography on a rooftop.

== Credits and personnel ==
Credits adapted from Genius.

- Somin (singer) – vocals
- Jiwoo – vocals
- BM (rapper) – vocals, songwriting
- J.Seph – vocals, songwriting
- BENJMN – production, songwriting
- Kim Do-Hoon – production
- Lee Hyeon Seung – production
- Cosmic Girl – songwriting

== Charts ==
Chart (2022)	Peak position
South Korea (Gaon Digital Chart)	TBA
US World Digital Songs (Billboard)	TBA

== Release history ==
Release history for Ring the Alarm
Region	Date	Format	Label
Various	June 22, 2022	Digital download; streaming	DSP Media; Kakao
