= Ride on the Wind (song) =

Single by Kard

from the EP Ride on the Wind
- Released: July 25, 2018
- Genre: Tropical house
- Length: 2:56
- Label: DSP Media; Kakao M
- Songwriters: Nassun; BM; GR8MOON
- Producers: Nassun; DALGUI; TAEMIN

Kard singles chronology
"You in Me" (2017)	"Ride on the Wind" (2018)	"Bomb Bomb" (2019)

"Ride on the Wind" is a song recorded by South Korean co-ed group Kard. It was released as the title track for their third extended play of the same name (2018). It was released in conjunction with the EP by DSP Media and distributed by Kakao M on July 25, 2018. A music video for the song was also released on July 25.

== Composition ==
The song was written by Nassun, member BM and GR8MOON, and produced by Nassun and DALGUI and TAEMIN.

Billboard described the song as an EDM track that features whistling synths and deep-toned strings, noting that the group continued their upbeat, tropically tinged dance music. It was also highlighted that member J.seph sings for the first time and member Jiwoo was given a prominent rap part.

== Release ==
The song was released in conjunction with the EP on July 25, 2018.

== Commercial performance ==
The song failed to enter the Gaon Digital Chart, but managed to debut and peak at number 92 on the componing Download Chart for its first three days of sales. The song also charted at number 21 on the Gaon Social Chart in its first week and at number 22 in its second week.

The song debuted and peaked at number 19 on the US World Digital Song Sales chart, marking their sixth entry on the chart.

== Music video ==
The music video was released on July 25. The video shows the members enjoying summertime activities, including riding around in a jeep and dancing in the wind. Vibrantly colored sets serve as a backdrop, and the group is seen performing foot-tapping and fist-pumping choreography amid meadows and on the beach.

== Charts ==
Chart (2018)	Peak position
US World Digital Songs (Billboard)	19
