= Ring the Alarm (disambiguation) =

"Ring the Alarm" is a 2006 song by Beyoncé.

Ring the Alarm may also refer to:

- Ring the Alarm (album), a 2004 album by Philly's Most Wanted
- "Ring the Alarm" (Fu-Schnickens song), 1991
- "Ring the Alarm" (Kard song), 2022
- "Ring the Alarm", a 1985 song by Tenor Saw
- "Ring the Alarm", a 2006 song by Keshia Chante from 2U
- "Ring the Alarm", a 2018 song by The Black Eyed Peas
- "Ring the Alarm", a 2017 song by Joey Badass from All-Amerikkkan Badass
