= Somin (singer) =

South Korean singer (born 1996)

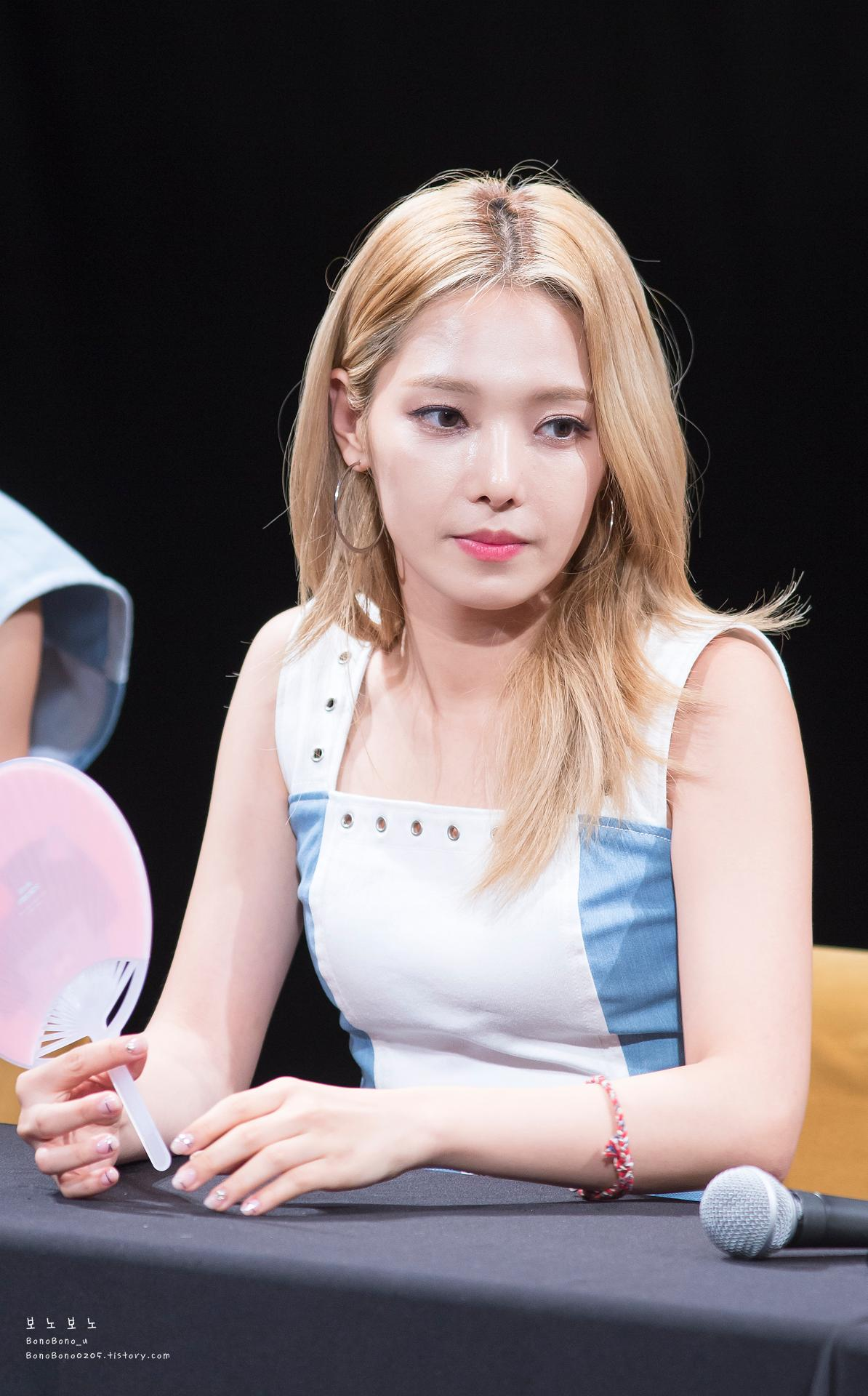
- Somin in 2017
- Born: Jeon So-min; August 22, 1996 (age 30); Seoul, South Korea
- Education: Seokyeong University; Seoul Broadcasting High School
- Occupations: Singer; songwriter; composer
- Musical career
- Genre: K-pop
- Instrument: Vocals
- Years active: 2012–present
- Label: DSP
- Member of: Kard
- Formerly of: Puretty; April

Korean name
- Hangul: 전소민
- RR: Jeon Somin
- MR: Chŏn Somin

Jeon So-min (Korean: 전소민; born August 22, 1996), known professionally as Somin (소민), is a South Korean singer, songwriter, and composer signed under DSP Media. She is a member of the co-ed group Kard, and a former member of South Korean girl groups Puretty and April. Somin made her solo debut with the EP Unveil, released on April 2, 2026.

== Personal life ==
Jeon So-min was born August 22, 1996, in Seongdong District, Seoul, South Korea. She studied at Seokyeong University and Seoul Broadcasting High School.

Somin has two older sisters. Twice member Jeongyeon is also a distant relative of Somin, as she is the niece of Somin's uncle's wife.

Somin opened her own YouTube channel, Minny J, on April 9, 2019, to show herself "not as Kard's Jeon So-min, but a lot of as the person Jeon So-min."

== Career ==
=== 2012–2015: Puretty, KARA Project and April ===
On September 5, 2012, Somin debuted in the girl group Puretty, which was a South Korean group based in Japan. They were planning to debut in South Korea as well. Puretty had their first performance at the 2012 Tokyo Toy Show and sang the song "Cheki Love" which is the theme song for the anime Pretty Rhythm: Dear My Future. The group disbanded in January 2014 without making their Korean debut.

In the same year, Somin, along with fellow Puretty members Yoon Chae-kyung and Cho Shi-yoon, participated in KARA Project, a show which was aimed to find new members for the girl group KARA. Somin reached the grand-finals and finished the show in third place, ultimately losing out to Heo Young-ji.

On August 24, 2015, Somin debuted again as a member and leader of the girl group April. She left the group in November 2015 to focus on her studying.

=== 2016–2025: Debut with Kard ===
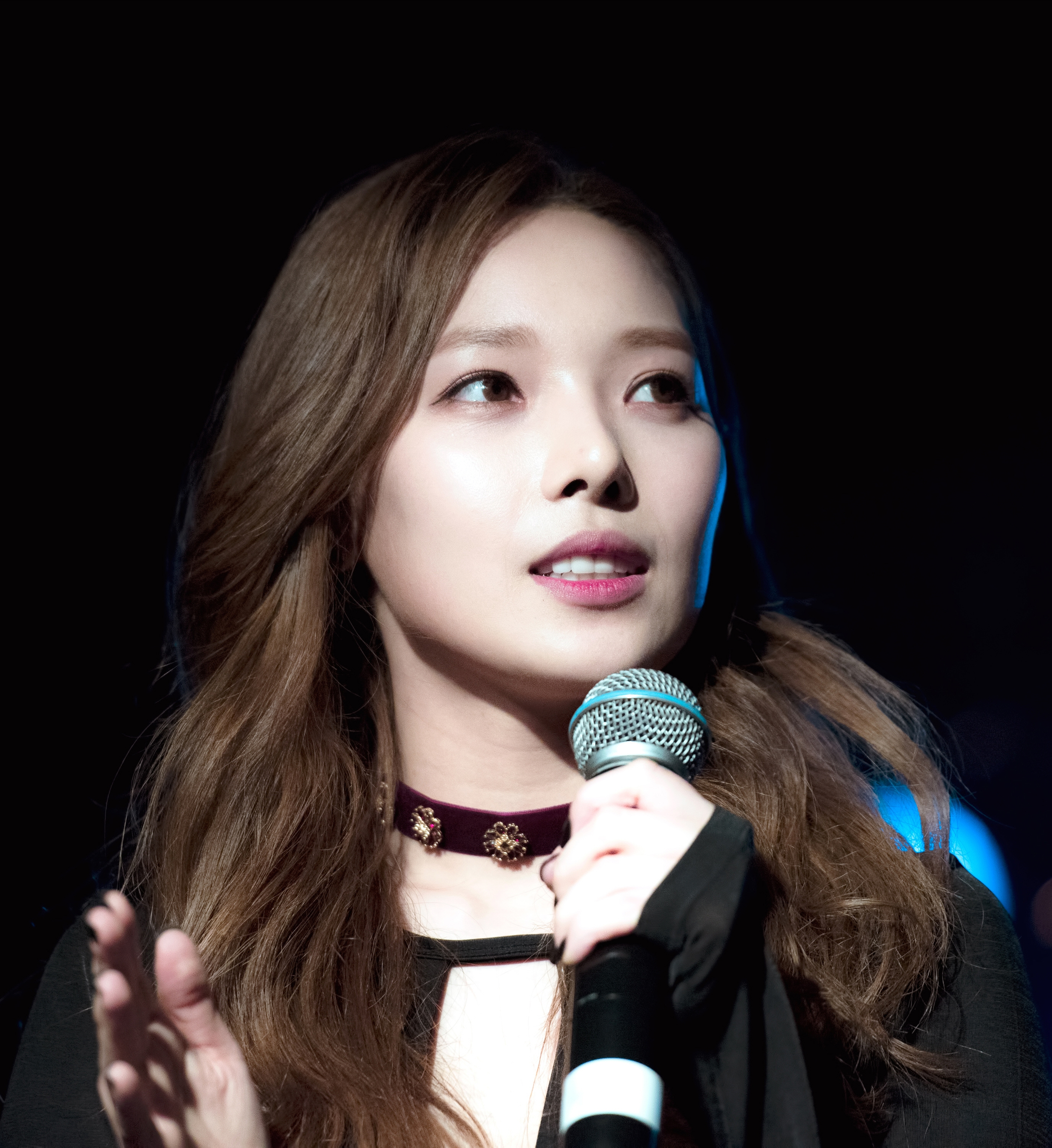
Somin in 2016

In 2016, Somin became a member of the co-ed group Kard. They released three pre-debut singles before debuting on July 19, 2017, with the mini-album Hola Hola.

In 2018, Somin was featured in a special version of Super Junior's "Lo Siento" with her fellow Kard member Jiwoo. She also collaborated with Pentagon's Hui in the song "Swim Good," and they performed together on Mnet's Breakers music show.

In 2019, Somin starred along with CLC's Seungyeon, celebrity stylist Han Hye-yeon, and other models and social media influencers in the beauty-themed show Next Beauty Creator, which airs on cable channel OnStyle. The seven cast members uploaded a new video every Tuesday to their YouTube channel, as they battled to earn the most views and subscribers and win the title "Next Beauty Creator." The winner got the backing of the cable network for their work as a beauty influencer for the period of one year, including collaboration opportunities and media appearances.

=== 2026–present: Solo debut with Unveil ===
On March 23, 2026, DSP Media announced Somin's solo debut with his first EP, titled Unveil. The EP was released on April 2, 2026, accompanied by the music video for its title track, "Backseat".

== Discography ==
=== Extended plays ===
Title	Album details
Unveil	Released: April 2, 2026; Label: DSP Media; Formats: CD, digital download, streaming; Track listing: 1. Backseat; 2. Love Me Like A Fan; 3. Keep It Cute; 4. Got It Like That; 5. Como Yo A Ti; 6. Closure; 7. Backseat (instrumental ver.)

=== Singles ===
Title	Year	Peak chart positions	Album
Title	Year	KOR Down.	Album
"Backseat"	2026	—	Unveil

=== As a featured artist ===
Year	Song	Note	Ref.
2018	"Lo Siento"	Special version	
2018	"Swim Good"	Collaborative song for Mnet's Breakers music show	

== Filmography ==
=== Television shows ===
Year	Title	Network	Role	Note	Ref.
2014	KARA Project	MBC Music	Herself	Contestant	
2014	KARA: Secret Love	DramaCube	Herself	Cameo appearance	
2015	April Episode		Herself	Lead role with April members	
2019	Next Beauty Creator	OnStyle	Herself	Cast member	
