= Kara Project =

2014 South Korean reality TV show

- Genre: Reality
- Written by: Jung Soo-jung; Kim Eun-jung; Kim Hye-jin; Yoo Hye-jin
- Country of origin: South Korea
- Original language: Korean
- No. of episodes: 6

Production
- Executive producer: Park Sang-min
- Producers: Park Jae-bum; Han Dae-hee
- Production locations: Seoul, South Korea
- Camera setup: Multi-camera
- Running time: Tuesday at 18:00 – 19:00 (KST)
- Production companies: DSP Media; MBC Plus Media

Original release
- Network: MBC M
- Release: 27 May – 1 July 2014

Kara Project is a 2014 South Korean reality television program starring the girl group Kara. It aired on MBC M from May 27 – 1 July 2014.

The program centred around the search to find a new member of Kara, following the departure of its members Nicole and Jiyoung. Seven trainees from DSP Media participated in the show, competing to become part of the group. The winner of the competition was Heo Young-ji, who became Kara's new member.

On February 24, 2015, contestant Ahn So-jin was found to have died from apparent suicide one month after DSP ended their contract with her. She had been a trainee for five years before participating in Kara Project.

== Contestants ==
Name		Notes
Romanized	Hangul	Notes
Ahn So-jin	안소진	Former Superstar K1 contestant.
Heo Young-ji	허영지	Currently a soloist under DSP Media and a member of Kara.
Cho Shi-yoon	조시윤	Former Puretty member and Produce 101 contestant.
Yoon Chae-kyung	윤채경	Former Puretty member. Produce 101 contestant. Former member of April.
Jeon So-min	전소민	Former Puretty member, Former April member, Currently a member of K.A.R.D.
Kim Chae-won	김채원	Former member of April.
Son Yoo-ji	손유지	Former member of 3YE.

== Results ==
Name		Ranking
Romanized	Hangul	Ranking
Heo Young-ji	허영지	1st
Ahn So-jin	안소진	2nd
Jeon So-min	전소민	3rd
Kim Chae-won	김채원	4th
Yoon Chae-kyung	윤채경	5th
Cho Shi-yoon	조시윤	6th
Son Yoo-ji	손유지	7th
