= Way with Words =

Music album

Single album by Kard
- Released: August 26, 2020
- Genre: K-hip hop
- Length: 9:42
- Language: Korean
- Label: DSP Media; Kakao M

Kard chronology
Red Moon (2020)	Way with Words (2020)	Re: (2022)

Singles from Way with Words
- 1. "Gunshot" Released: August 26, 2020

Way with Words is the first single album by South Korean co-ed group Kard. It was released on August 26, 2020, by DSP Media and distributed by Kakao M. It consists of three songs with "Gunshot" released as the A-side and "Ah Ee Yah" and "Hold On" as its B-sides.

== Background and release ==
On August 17, 2020, at midnight K.S.T. DSP Media released a teaser poster for the group's upcoming release. The poster has a black and white theme, a sensuous image that expresses a broken heart. It will be the first single album for the group titled Way with Words and will be released on August 26.

On August 18, BM and J.Seph teaser images were released, and a day later, Somin and Jiwoo's images were released through the group's official social media accounts. It was also revealed that the single album will consists of three songs, noting that member BM contributed to the lyrics and production of all of the songs, meanwhile J.Seph also contributed to the lyrics in all of the songs.

The A-side "Gunshot" was performed for the first at the 'Wild Kard - Seoul' online concert on August 22.

Way with Words was released on August 26, 2020, through several music portals, including MelOn and Apple Music.

== Music video ==
A key point dance video for "Gunshot" was released on August 24. A day later, a music video teaser was released. In the video, the strong and heavy sound of "Gunshot" and the charm of the members are melted. In particular, the sensational cuts symbolizing the message of a gunshot, as well as the powerful performance of Kard.

== Track listing ==
No.	Title	Lyrics	Music	Arrangement	Length
1.	"Ah Ee Yah" (ㅏㅣㅑ)	BM; Kyuwon 'Q' Kim (617 Music); J.Seph	BM; Kyuwon 'Q' Kim (617 Music)	Wiidope (617 Music); BM	3:20
2.	"Gunshot"	BM; J.Seph	BM; Kyuwon 'Q' Kim (617 Music)	Wiidope (617 Music); BM	3:01
3.	"Hold On"	BM; J.Seph	Hayley Aitken; Olof Lindskog; 72	Ollipop	3:21
Total length:					9:42

== Charts ==
Chart performance for Way with Words
Chart (2020)	Peak position
South Korean Albums (Gaon)	12
