= Bomb Bomb =

Single by Kard
- Released: March 27, 2019
- Genre: K-pop
- Length: 2:43
- Label: DSP Media; Kakao M
- Songwriters: 24; BM
- Producer: 24

Kard singles chronology
"Ride on the Wind" (2018)	"Bomb Bomb" (2019)	"Dumb Litty" (2019)

"Bomb Bomb" is a song recorded by South Korean co-ed group Kard. It was released by DSP Media and distributed by Kakao M on March 27, 2019, as a digital single. A music video for the song was also released on the same day.

== Composition ==
The song was written by member BM and 24, and the latter also served as producer.

== Background and release ==
On March 18, 2019, it was announced that the group will be returning with a digital single titled "Bomb Bomb" on March 27. A day later, a trailer video was released showing each member in a different scenario. The video reached 600,000 views in three days, and the group's YouTube channel reached 1.8 million subscribers. On March 21, individual concept photos were released.

"Bomb Bomb" was released as a digital single on March 27, 2019, through various music portals, including MelOn and iTunes.

== Commercial performance ==
"Bomb Bomb" topped the iTunes K-pop singles chart in 21 countries including emerging markets such as Brazil, Mexico, France, and Spain, as well as big markets such as the United States and Great Britain. The song also placed at number 20th on iTunes worldwide chart, and also on the iTunes Singles Chart at number 44th in the US and at number 69th in the UK.

The song debuted at number 3 on the US World Digital Song Sales chart, marking their seventh entry on the chart and their fifth Top 5 hit, after "Oh Nana" and "Don't Recall" peaked at number 5, and "Rumor" at number 3, and "Hola Hola" at number 4.

== Charts ==
Chart (2019)	Peak position
US World Digital Songs (Billboard)	3

== Release history ==
Region	Date	Format	Label
South Korea	March 27, 2019	Digital download	DSP Media
Various territories	March 28, 2019	Digital download	DSP Media
