= Ride on the Wind =

- Digital cover

EP by Kard
- Released: July 25, 2018
- Recorded: 2018
- Studio: DSP (Seoul)
- Genres: EDM; trap; reggaeton
- Length: 17:34
- Language: Korean
- Labels: DSP Media; Kakao M
- Producer: Nassun

Kard chronology
You & Me (2017)	Ride on the Wind (2018)	Red Moon (2020)

Singles from KARD
- 1. "Ride on the Wind" Released: July 25, 2018

Ride on the Wind (stylized in all caps) is the third extended play by South Korean co-ed group Kard. It was released on July 25, 2018, by DSP Media and distributed by Kakao M. The EP consists of six tracks, and was supported by the single of the same name.

== Background and release ==
On June 15, 2018, DSP Media confirmed that the group would make a comeback in July with their third mini-album. Later that month, an image teaser was uploaded, with the numbers 725 and 819. The former was revealed to be the release date for the album, July 25. The latter refers to the date of the group's concert in Seoul, August 19.

Individual member video teasers were released between July 11–12, followed by the album's track list on July 13. Concept photos of the members were released from July 14–17. Pre-orders for the album began on July 18, along with a preview for the physical album packaging. On July 19, the group held a Facebook Live for their first anniversary. The next day, a spoiler video featuring member J.Seph was released on YouTube. The album's highlight medley was released July 21, followed by a music video teaser uploaded a day later.

== Promotion ==
=== Singles ===
The title track, "Ride on the Wind", was released alongside the album on July 25. A music video was released the same day.

=== Live promotions ===
Kard held the Wild Kard in Seoul concert on August 19. The group also toured several countries in Latin America in September and Brazil at the end of the month for their respective Wild Kard tours.

== Commercial performance ==
The EP debuted and peaked at number 7 on the Gaon Album Chart for the week ending July 28, 2018. It also debuted and peaked at number 8 on the US World Albums chart for the week ending August 4, 2018. It fell to number 12 in its second week.

The EP was the 30th best-selling album in July 2018 with 7,681 physical copies sold.

== Track listing ==
No.	Title	Lyrics	Music	Arrangement	Length
1.	"INTRO: Humming"		DALGUI; Nassun	DALGUI	1:12
2.	"Moonlight"	Nassun; BM; J.seph; GR8MOON	Nassun; Rich Jang; DALGUI; DONO	Rich Jang; DALGUI	3:19
3.	"Ride on the Wind"	Nassun; BM; GR8MOON	Nassun; DALGUI; TAEMIN	DALGUI	2:56
4.	"Knockin' On My Heaven's Door"	Nassun; BM; J.seph; GR8MOON	COMACOMA; Nassun	COMACOMA; Chad Mad	3:50
5.	"Dímelo"	Park Jung-wook; Kim Jun-yl; Blenn; BM; J.seph	dani; Park Jung-wook	dani; Park Jung-wook; Jung Chan-hee	3:21
6.	"Ride on the Wind" (Inst.)		Nassun; DALGUI; TAEMIN	DALGUI	2:56
Total length:					17:34

== Charts ==
Chart (2018)	Peak position
South Korean Albums (Gaon)	7
US World Albums (Billboard)	8
