= Alohara (Can You Feel It?) =

- Digital cover

EP by Goo Hara
- Released: July 21, 2015
- Recorded: June 2015
- Genre: K-pop
- Length: 21:11
- Labels: DSP Media; LOEN

Singles from Alohara (Can You Feel It?)
- 1. "Choco Chip Cookies" Released: July 14, 2015; 2. "How About Me?" Released: July 21, 2015

Alohara (Can You Feel It?) is the only extended play by South Korean singer Goo Hara, a member of South Korean girl group Kara. It was released on July 21, 2015 under DSP Media and distributed by LOEN Entertainment. The EP reached number 4 on Korea's Gaon Weekly Albums Chart. It is the only major solo release by Hara before her death on November 24, 2019.

== Release and reception ==
On July 7, 2015, it was announced that Hara would be making her solo debut, with a video preview of the second single "How About Me?", released the same day. The album's full tracklist was later revealed on July 13. On July 14, 2015, the album's first single "Choco Chip Cookies", released, featuring rapper Giriboy. The track ranked #21 on Korean music chart.

The second single "How about Me?" was released on July 21, 2015 to promote the mini album.

== Promotion ==
Hara promoted the singles "Choco Chip Cookies" and "How About Me?" on music shows in July and August 2015 on KBS's Music Bank, MBC's Show! Music Core, SBS's Inkigayo and Mnet's M! Countdown.

== Track listing ==
No.	Title	Length
1.	"How About Me? (어때?; Eottae)" (featuring Heo Young-ji)	3:40
2.	"Choco Chip Cookies" (featuring Giriboy)	3:46
3.	"La La La" (featuring Matthew)	3:13
4.	"Hara Goo (하라구)"	3:23
5.	"Rainy Day"	3:26
6.	"Choco Chip Cookies" (Instrumental)	3:46
Total length:		21:11

== Charts ==
Chart	Peak position
Gaon Weekly albums chart	4
Gaon Monthly albums chart	17

== Release history ==
Country	Date	Format	Label
South Korea	July 21, 2015	CD	DSP Entertainment, Loen Entertainment
