= Dumb Litty =

Single by Kard

from the EP Red Moon
- Released: September 22, 2019
- Genre: K-pop; trap
- Length: 3:13
- Songwriter(s): BM; J.seph; Versachoi
- Producer(s): BM; Versachoi

Kard singles chronology
"Bomb Bomb" (2019)	"Dumb Litty" (2019)	"Red Moon" (2020)

Music video
- "Dumb Litty" on YouTube

"Dumb Litty" is a song recorded by South Korean co-ed group Kard. It was released by DSP Media and distributed by Kakao M on September 22, 2019, as their second digital single. It was later included in their fourth extended play Red Moon (2020).

== Composition ==
The song was written by members BM and J.seph alongside Versachoi, who also produced the song with BM. Musically was described as heavy trap with EDM and touches of oriental instruments. Lyrically, is a declaration of partying until dawn.

== Release ==
The song was released as a digital single on September 22, 2019, through various music portals, including MelOn and iTunes.

== Chart performance ==
The song peaked at number 3 on the US World Digital Songs chart on October 5, 2019. This is their sixth top 10 single and tenth entry on the chart.

== Music video ==
The music video was also released on September 22, 2019. In the video, the four members portray two gods each: BM is Thor and Zeus, J.Seph is Ares and Dionysus, Jiwoo is Hera and Athena while Somin is Aphrodite and Chloris. Each of the members are dressed to correspond with their respective roles, for example as the goddess of war Athena, Jiwoo carries a sword, while J.Seph as Dionysus, the god of wine and music, holds a glass of wine as he lies draped over an opulent throne. The video alternates between solo clips of each of the members in their godly avatars before swapping to group shots of KARD, dressed in casual grunge/goth apparel, engage in fast-paced choreography over the chorus.

== Charts ==
Chart (2019)	Peak position
US World Digital Songs (Billboard)	3
