= You & Me (EP) =

- Digital cover

EP by KARD
- Released: November 21, 2017
- Studio: DSP (Seoul)
- Genre: EDM
- Length: 34:23
- Language: Korean
- Label: DSP; LOEN
- Producer: Nassun; DALGWI; Blackpilz

KARD chronology
Hola Hola (2017)	You & Me (2017)	Ride on the Wind (2018)

Singles from You & Me
- 1. "You in Me" Released: November 21, 2017; 2. "Trust Me" Released: December 6, 2017

Music video
- "You In Me" on YouTube; Trust Me on YouTube

You & Me is the second extended play by South Korean co-ed group KARD. It was released on November 21, 2017, by DSP Media and distributed by LOEN Entertainment. The EP consists of nine tracks, including the lead single "You in Me".

The EP debuted at number 8 on the Gaon Album Chart, at number 4 on the US World Albums and at number 17 on the US Heatseekers Albums. It has sold over 11,500 physical copies as of November 2017.

== Background and release ==
On November 6, 2017, the group released an image on their official Twitter account with the caption "2017.11.21 #COMINGUP". A day after, the same image was released again, this time with the words "You & Me, You In Me" written on it.

On November 8, the full track list was revealed. The EP consists of a total of nine tracks, of which only six are available in its digital edition and nine in its physical edition. On November 11, teaser images of each member and the group were released. A day later, the album package was detailed. It consists of a booklet of 76 pages, two types of photocards, a group poster, and a track list sticker designed by member BM, only for pre-orders. On November 18, a highlight medley was released through the group's official YouTube channel, showing a preview of the main six tracks. They also uploaded various videos, showing the behind the scenes of the jacket photos and recording sessions.

The EP was released on November 21 through several music portals, including MelOn and iTunes.

== Promotion ==
=== Singles ===
"You in Me" was released as the lead single in conjunction with the EP on November 21, alongside the music video.

"Trust Me" was released as a promotional single. It was performed live on Music Bank on November 24, as part of their comeback stage. On December 6, the music video was released as a prequel film to the "You In Me" music video.

=== Live performances ===
The group held a comeback showcase on the day of the album release. The group started promoting on music programs, with their first performance being on MBC Music's Show Champion on November 22. They continued on KBS's Music Bank on November 24, MBC's Show! Music Core on November 25 and SBS's Inkigayo on November 26.

== Commercial performance ==
You & Me debuted at number 8 on the Gaon Album Chart, on the chart issue dated November 19–25, 2017. It also debuted at number 4 on the US World Albums chart, and at number 17 on the US Heatseekers Albums chart, on the week ending December 9, 2017, achieving a new peak as a group in the latest chart, after their debut EP peaked at number 25. The EP debuted at number 23 on the Gaon chart for the month of November 2017, with 11,515 physical copies sold.

== Track listing ==
You & Me – Digital download
No.	Title	Lyrics	Music	Arrangement	Length
1.	"Into You"	Nassun; BM; J.seph	Nassun; Blackpillz; e.one; Dono S.Rodriguez	Blackpillz	3:32
2.	"Trust Me" (J.seph & Jiwoo version)	Nassun; J.seph	Nassun; DALGUI	DALGUI	4:22
3.	"Push & Pull"	Nassun; BM; J.seph	Nassun; J-Path; Blackpillz	J-Path; Blackpillz	3:17
4.	"Because" (지니까)	Nassun; BM; J.seph	Nassun; Blackpillz	Blackpillz	3:42
5.	"You in Me"	Nassun; BM; J.seph	Nassun; DALGUI	DALGUI	3:23
6.	"Trust Me" (BM & Somin version)	Nassun; BM	Nassun; DALGUI	DALGUI	4:36
Total length:					22:52

You & Me – Physical edition (bonus tracks)
No.	Title	Lyrics	Music	Arrangement	Length
7.	"Into You" (Inst.)		Nassun; Blackpillz; e.one; Dono S.Rodriguez	Blackpillz	3:32
8.	"You In Me" (Inst.)		Nassun; DALGUI	DALGUI	3:23
9.	"Trust Me" (KARD version)	Nassun; BM; J.seph	Nassun; DALGUI	DALGUI	2:29
Total length:					32:16

== Charts ==
Chart (2017)	Peak position
French Albums (SNEP)	170
South Korean Albums (Gaon)	8
US World Albums (Billboard)	2
US Heatseekers Albums (Billboard)	17

== Release history ==
Region	Date	Format	Label
South Korea	November 21, 2017	Digital download	DSP Media
Various	November 21, 2017	Digital download	DSP Media
South Korea	November 22, 2017	CD	DSP Media
