= Hola Hola (EP) =

- Digital cover

EP by KARD
- Released: July 19, 2017
- Studio: DSP (Seoul)
- Genres: EDM; tropical house
- Length: 21:18
- Labels: DSP; LOEN
- Producers: Nassun; Dalgwi; Big Tone; EJ Show

KARD chronology
Hola Hola (2017)	You & Me (2017)

Singles from KARD
- 1. "Hola Hola" Released: July 19, 2017

Hola Hola is the debut extended play by South Korean co-ed group, KARD. It was released on July 19, 2017, by DSP Media and distributed by LOEN Entertainment. The EP consists of ten songs in its physical release and six songs in its digital release. Both include previous pre-release tracks released under "KARD Project" singles: "Oh Nana", "Don't Recall", and "Rumor".

The EP peaked at number 2 on the Gaon Album Chart and at number 3 on the US World Albums chart. It has sold over 18,300 physical copies as of November 2017.

== Background ==
On June 30, 2017, it was announced that the debut album from the group will be released on July 19, 2017, with no further details. A day later, it was revealed the name as Hola Hola and that it would be an extended play. From July 3 to July 5, individual images of each member were released, starting with members Jiwoo and BM and continuing with J.seph and Somin. On July 6, DSP Media revealed the track list through the group's official Twitter account. The track list consists of six songs, including the three pre-released songs titled as the "KARD Project". On July 10, the first music video teaser for "Hola Hola" was released, featuring the group various locations, including Las Vegas and Los Angeles. Two days later, the format of the album was revealed to include a booklet of 80 pages, two photo cards in two versions and a poster. It was also revealed that the physical copy will include a total of 10 songs and will be released on July 20. On July 13, a preview of the EP songs was released through the group's official YouTube channel. On July 17, a special teaser for the title track was released, showing behind the scenes footage of the music video recording.

The EP was released on July 19, 2017, through several music portals, including MelOn in South Korea, and iTunes for the global market.

== Composition ==
The digital EP consists of six songs, including three pre-debut projects, while the physical copy also comes with four instrumentals. The title track, "Hola Hola", is influenced by tropical house and sounds like "climb up" when read in Korean. "I can't stop" is a remake of the 1992 single by ZAM, a co-ed idol group by DSP Media, mixing in future bass synths to the original song. All members of KARD participated in writing, composing, and the arrangement of "Living Good," in which they expressed their gratitude to fans, family, and friends who supported their debut.

== Promotion ==
=== Singles ===
"Oh NaNa" was released as the first KARD Project single on December 13, 2016, featuring Heo Youngji. A music video for the song was also released on December 13. The song peaked at number 5 on Billboard's World Digital Songs chart.

"Don't Recall" was released as the second KARD Project single on February 16, 2017. The song was also released with an English version. The song debuted at number 5 on World Digital Songs chart.

"Rumor" was released as the third and final KARD Project single on April 24, 2017. The song debuted at number 3 on World Digital Songs chart, selling 3,000 downloads on the week ending May 13, 2017. This is the best song performance by the group.

"Hola Hola" was released in conjunction with the EP on July 19, 2017, as the title track. The first music video teaser was released on July 10, 2017, previewing a few seconds of the song and showing the group in summery scenarios. On July 15, a "key point of dance" video was released. The official music video was also released on July 19. The song debuted at number 76 on the Gaon Digital Chart, on the chart issue dated July 16–22, 2017, - marking the first entry for the group - with 28,983 downloads sold. The song also peaked atop the Gaon Social Chart in the same week.

== Commercial performance ==
Hola Hola debuted at number 6 on the Gaon Album Chart, on the chart issue dated July 16–22, 2017. A week later, the EP peaked at number 2. The EP also debuted at number 3 on the US World Albums chart, and at number 25 on the US Heatseekers Albums chart, on the week ending August 5, 2017.

The EP placed at number 10 on the Gaon Album Chart for the month of July 2017, with 12,962 physical copies sold. It has sold over 18,343 physical copies as of November 2017.

== Track listing ==
Hola Hola – Digital download
No.	Title	Lyrics	Music	Arrangement	Length
1.	"Oh NaNa" (featuring Heo Young-ji)	Nassun; BM; J.seph	Nassun; Dalgwi; Big Tone; EJ Show	Dalgwi	3:26
2.	"Don't Recall"	Nassun; Big Tone; J.seph	Nassun; EJ Show; Big Tone	EJ Show	3:28
3.	"Rumor"	Nassun; BM	Nassun; EJ Show; Big Tone	EJ Show	3:37
4.	"Hola Hola"	Nassun; BM; J.seph; Big Tone	Nassun; DALGUI; Big Tone	DALGUI	3:22
5.	"I Can't Stop" (나는 멈추지 않는다; naneun meomchuji anhneunda)	Cho Jinho	Cho Jinho	DALGUI; Nassun	3:49
6.	"Living Good" (Special thanks to)	BM; J.seph; Jeon Somin; Jeon Jiwoo; LEEZ; Nassun	BM; J.seph; Jeon Somin; Jeon Jiwoo; LEEZ; Nassun	BM; LEEZ	3:35
Total length:					21:25

Hola Hola – Physical edition (bonus tracks)
No.	Title	Music	Arrangement	Length
7.	"Oh NaNa" (Inst.)	Nassun; Dalgwi; Big Tone; EJ Show	Dalgwi	3:26
8.	"Don't Recall" (Inst.)	Nassun; EJ Show; Big Tone	EJ Show	3:28
9.	"Rumor" (Inst.)	Nassun; EJ Show; Big Tone	EJ Show	3:37
10.	"Living Good" (Inst.)	BM; J.seph; Jeon Somin; Jeon Jiwoo; LEEZ; Nassun	BM; LEEZ	3:35
Total length:				35:36

== Charts ==
Chart (2017)	Peak position
French Albums (SNEP)	171
South Korea (Gaon Album Chart)	2
Taiwan's Five Music Weekly Chart	7
US World Albums (Billboard)	3
US Heatseekers Albums (Billboard)	25

== Release history ==
Region	Date	Format	Label
South Korea	July 19, 2017	Digital download	DSP Media, LOEN Entertainment
Worldwide	July 19, 2017	Digital download	DSP Media, LOEN Entertainment
South Korea	July 20, 2017	CD	DSP Media, LOEN Entertainment
