= You in Me =

Single by KARD

from the album You & Me
- Released: November 21, 2017
- Genre: K-pop
- Length: 3:29
- Label: DSP Media; LOEN Entertainment
- Songwriter(s): Nassun; BM; J.seph
- Producer(s): Nassun; DALGUI

KARD singles chronology
"Hola Hola" (2017)	"You in Me" (2017)	"Ride on the Wind" (2018)

Music video
- "You In Me" on YouTube

"You In Me" is a song recorded by South Korean co-ed group KARD for their second extended play, You & Me (2017). The song was released as the EP title track by DSP Media and distributed by LOEN Entertainment, on November 21, 2017.

== Composition ==
The song was written by members BM and J.seph, alongside longtime collaborator Nassun, who also produced the song with DALGUI. The song was described by Billboard's Tamar Herman, as a smooth EDM track containing elements of trop and dancehall, adding that the lyrics were about the desperation of love.

== Chart performance ==
The song failed to enter the Gaon Digital Chart, but entered the componing Download Chart at number 98 with 12,962 downloads sold in its first five days.

The song also peaked at number 11 on the US World Digital Song Sales chart, marking their fifth entry on the chart.

== Music video ==
A music video teaser was released through the group official YouTube channel on November 18 and a day later, a "key point dance" video was also released. The music video was released on November 21. It features members Somin and BM acting as a lowlife couple acting as a foil to the classy pair of members Jiwoo and J.Seph. The storyline unfolds, revealing that the women's unhealthy passion for their partners have created a shocking, Faulkner-esque situation, where each of the women are embracing not lovers but two corpses. Billboard described the video as "haunting", taking the edgy, obsessive nature of its lyrics.

=== Prequel ===
On December 6, a music video for "Trust Me" was released, serving as a prequel film to "You In Me" music video.

== Live performances ==
The group performed the song for the first time on the album's showcase held on November 21. They also used the song to promote the EP on music programs, starting on MBC Music's Show Champion on November 22, continuing on KBS's Music Bank on November 24, MBC's Show! Music Core on November 25 and SBS's Inkigayo on November 26.

== Charts ==
Chart (2017)	Peak position
US World Digital Songs (Billboard)	11
