= Seoul Broadcasting High School =

Seoul Broadcasting High School 서울방송고등학교
- 131 Dongho-ro 5-gil, Seongdong-gu, Seoul; South Korea

Information
- Type: Public
- Motto: 마음을 다하여 푸른꿈 키우자
- Established: 1991
- Principal: Yang Han-seok (양한석)
- Deputy Principal: Yang Seung-jin (양승진)
- Faculty: 76
- Gender: Boys and girls
- School Tree: Ginkgo biloba
- School Flower: Forsythia
- Website: http://www.seb.hs.kr/

Seoul Broadcasting High School (Korean: 서울방송고등학교) is a specialised public high school located in Oksu-dong, Seongdong-gu, Seoul.

== History ==
Seoul Broadcasting High School was founded on October 30, 1991 under the name Dongho Technical High School (동호공업고등학교). The school changed its name to Dongho Information Technical High School (동호정보공업고등학교) in 2001 before changing it to its current Seoul Broadcasting High School on February 29, 2008. Current principal Yang Han-seok was appointed on March 1, 2013 as the school's 9th principal. As of 4 February 2015, there are a total of 7,177 graduates.

== Departments ==
- Broadcasting Video (방송영상과)
- Broadcasting System (방송시스템과)
- Media Contents (미디어콘텐츠과)
- Broadcasting Entertainment (방송연예공과)

== Notable alumni ==
=== 2017 ===
- Dino

=== 2016 ===
- Mingyu
- Seungkwan
- Kang Min-ah

=== 2014 ===
- Baekho
- Kim Jong-hyeon

=== 2013 ===
- Kaeun (After School)
