= Yoon Chae-kyung =

South Korean actress (born 1996)

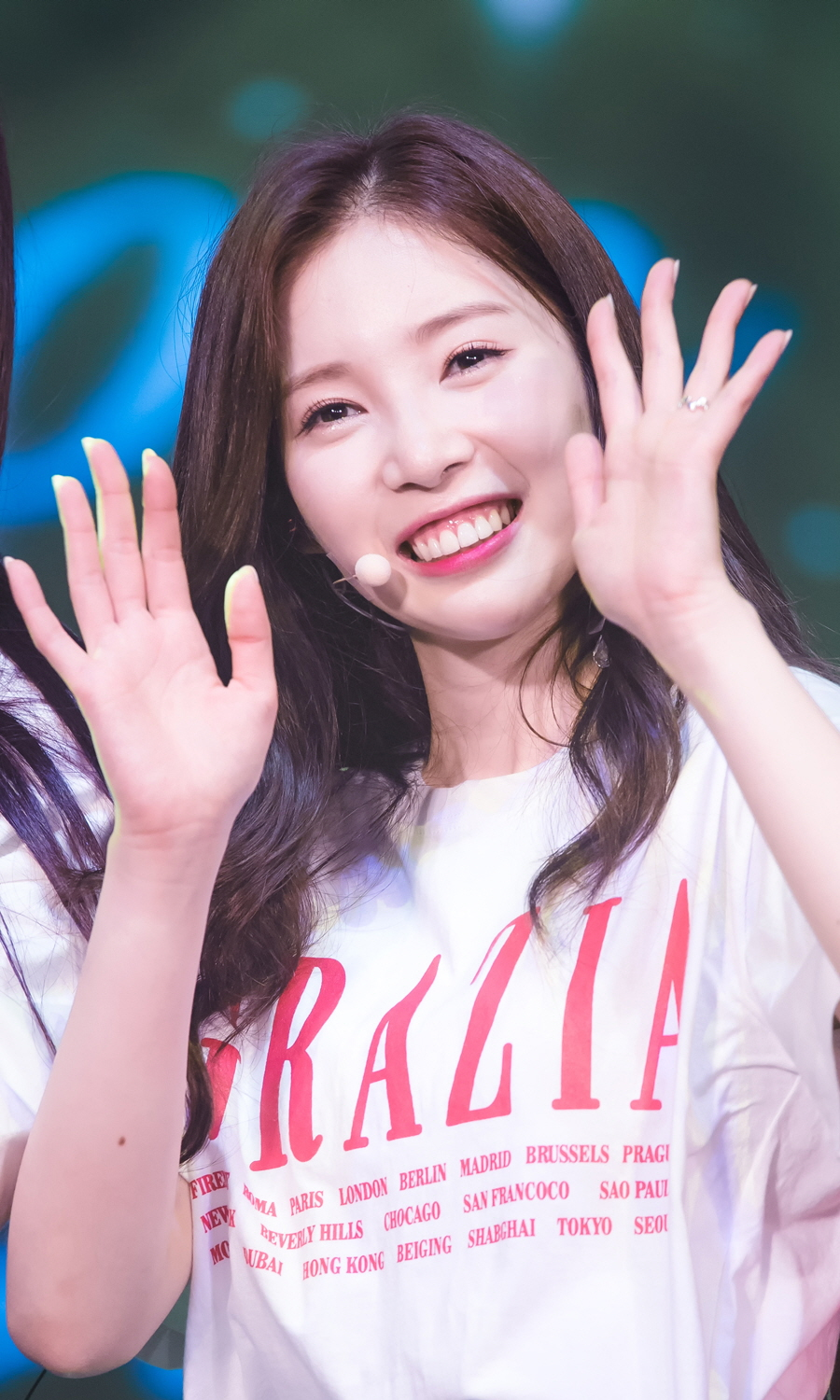
- Yoon in April 2018
- Born: July 7, 1996 (age 30); Incheon, South Korea
- Education: Hanlim Multi Art School
- Occupations: Actress; singer
- Years active: 2012–2014; 2016–present
- Musical career
- Genre: K-pop
- Instrument: Vocals
- Years active: 2012–2014; 2016–2022
- Label: DSP
- Formerly of: Puretty; CIVA; I.B.I; April

Korean name
- Hangul: 윤채경
- Hanja: 尹彩暻
- RR: Yun Chaegyeong
- MR: Yun Ch'aegyŏng

Yoon Chae-kyung (Korean: 윤채경; born July 7, 1996), is a South Korean actress and singer. Yoon began her career with debuted as a member of Puretty under DSP in Japan during 2012 and the group later disbanded in January 2014. Following the disbandment, Yoon appeared as a contestant in the 2014 Kara's reality show for searching a new member Kara Project. She also appeared in the reality show Produce 101 and later in the mockumentary series The God of Music 2 which she became a member of project group C.I.V.A and also joined the fan-made group of Produce 101, I.B.I both respectively in 2016. Yoon later was added as a member of the DSP girl group April in 2016 and participated in group activities until their disbandment in 2022.

== Early life ==
Yoon Chae-kyung was born on July 7, 1996, in Incheon and grew up in Siheung. She graduated from Eungye Middle School and Hanlim Multi Art School.

== Career ==
=== 2012–14: Puretty and Kara Project ===
On September 5, 2012, Chaekyung debuted in the girl group Puretty, which was a South Korean group based in Japan. They were planning to debut in South Korea as well. Puretty had their first performance at the 2012 Tokyo Toy Show and sang the song "Cheki Love" which is the theme song for the anime Pretty Rhythm: Dear My Future. The group disbanded in January 2014 without making their Korean debut.

In mid-2014, Yoon participated in Kara Project, a reality show to competed become new members of the girl group Kara.

=== 2016: Produce 101, C.I.V.A and I.B.I ===
In early 2016, Yoon represented DSP Media on Produce 101, a show where the final 11 contestants formed the girl group I.O.I. In the final episode, she was ranked in 16th place. On May 1, she released a digital single in collaboration with April's Chaewon titled "Clock" (Korean: 시계).

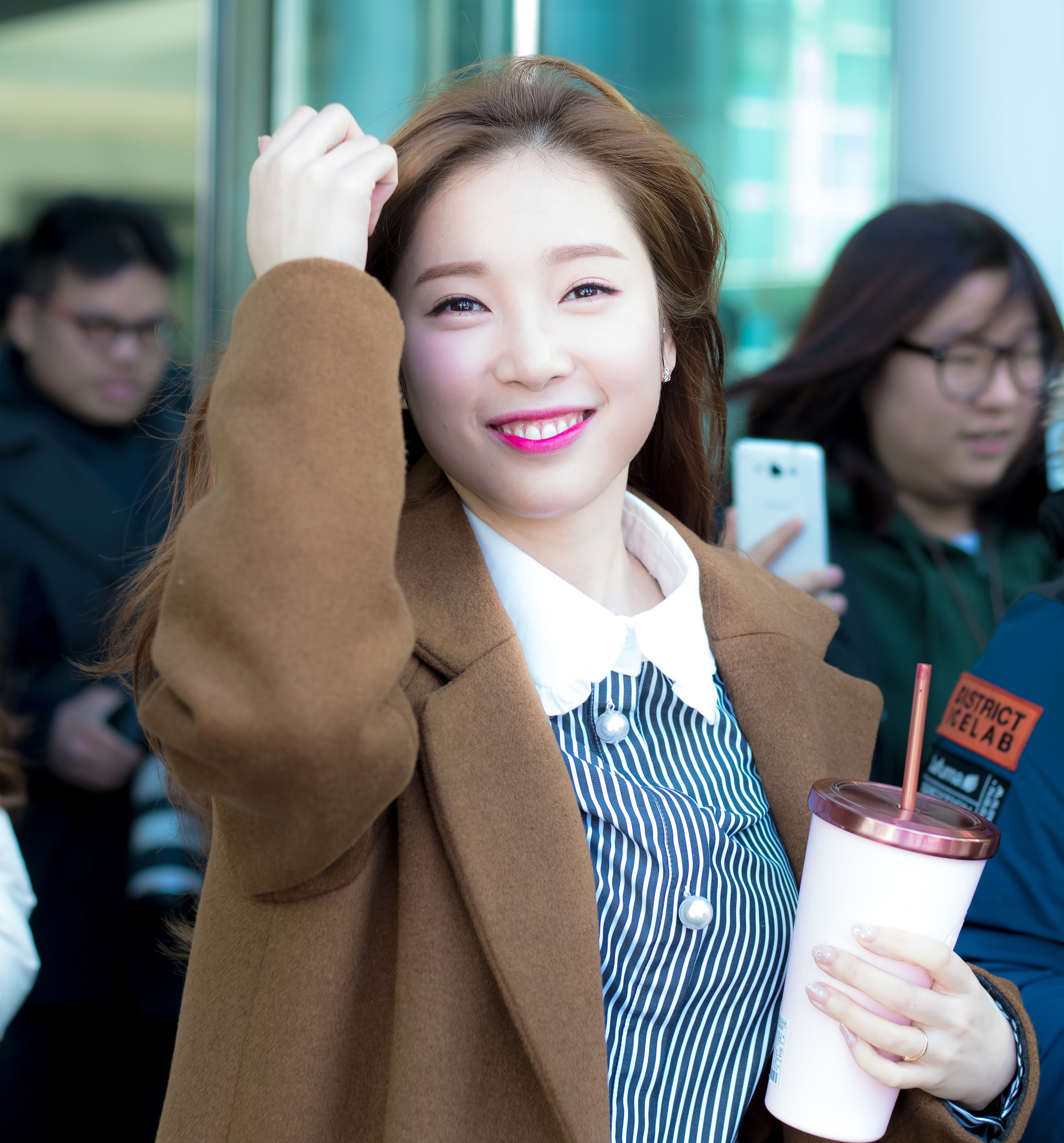
Chae-kyung on January 16, 2017.

In July 2016, she was cast as a trainee in Mnet's mockumentary series The God of Music 2 with a few other Produce 101 contestants and later formed the project girl group, C.I.V.A, which released the song "Why" featuring Miryo.

In August 2016, she joined LOEN Entertainment's project group IBI. The group released the digital single "Molae Molae" (Korean: 몰래몰래) on August 18. On November 11, it was revealed that she would be joining April, following the departure of one of its members.

=== 2017–present: April and acting career ===
Yoon debuted as a member of April with their third EP Prelude on January 4, 2017 The group officially disbanded on January 28, 2022.

In February 2022, Yoon was confirmed as being cast on web-drama Calming Signal, played role of Cha Do-hee.

On April 22, 2022, Yoon decided to end her contract with DSP Media. Later on April 25, 2022, Yoon signed a contract with Management A.M.9.

On November 19, 2023, Yoon starred in the KBS historical drama Korea-Khitan War with played the character Queen Wonhwa.

On March 27, 2025, it was reported that Yoon would not renew her exclusive contract with Management AM9, which was set to expire on April 25. In November 2025, Yoon starred as Lee Na-gyeom in the short-form drama 내가 떠난 뒤 (After I Left) and signed an exclusive contract with PA Entertainment.

In January 2026, Yoon was cast as Maeng Seul-hee in the comedy-thriller short-form drama 브라이덜샤워: 사라진 신부 (Bridal Shower: The Missing Bride). In April 2026, Yoon was cast as Baek Seol-hee in the short-form drama remake, 사랑의 유턴 (Love's U-Turn). In June 2026, EPIM Entertainment listed Yoon among its artists on its official website. In July 2026, PA Entertainment, which had signed Yoon in November 2025, announced that it would cease management operations and begin procedures to close following the death of its CEO. On August 26, 2026, Yoon was reported to have signed an exclusive contract with Yong Entertainment to focus on her acting activities.

== Discography ==
=== Collaborations ===
Title	Year	Peak chart positions	Sales	Album
Title	Year	KOR	Sales	Album
"Clock" (시계) (with Chaewon of April)	2016	— (Note: "Clock" did not enter the Gaon Digital Chart, but peaked at number 166 on the Gaon Download Chart.)	KOR: 10,343	Non-album singles
"Lovesome" (우리 꼭 사귀는 것 같잖아요) (with Voisper)	2019	—	N/A	Non-album singles
"—" denotes a recording that did not chart.

=== Promotional singles ===
Title	Year	Album
"Yellow" (with Nam Tae-hyun, Giant Pink, Kanto)	2018	Non-album singles
"Happy Now" (with Kim Il-joong)	2021	Non-album singles

== Filmography ==
=== Film ===
Year	Title	Role	Ref.
2023	In Dream	Seo Yoon-kyeong	

=== Television series ===
Year	Title	Role	Notes	Ref.
2023–2024	Korea–Khitan War	Queen Wonhwa		
2025	Confidence Queen	Lee Hye-yoon	Cameo (ep. 7–8)	

=== Web series ===
Year	Title	Role	Notes	Ref.
2021	Time to Be Together 1:11	Song Yeo-wool		
2022	Calming Signal	Cha Do-hee		
2025	내가 떠난 뒤 (After I Left)	Lee Na-Gyeom	Short-form drama	
2026	브라이덜샤워: 사라진 신부 (Bridal Shower: The Missing Bride)	Maeng Seul-hee	Short-form drama	
2026	사랑의 유턴 (Love's U-Turn)	Baek Seol-hee	Short-form drama	

=== Television shows ===
Year	Title	Role	Notes	Ref.
2014	Kara Project	Contestant		
2016	Produce 101	Contestant		
2016	The God of Music 2	Cast member		
2016	Plan Man	Cast member	Episode 7–9	
2016	We Will Eat Well	Cast member		
2017	Law of the Jungle	Cast member	Episode 283–287	
2020	Top 10 Student	Panel		
2020	People of Trot	Vice manager		
2021	Jury 24	Cast member		

== Theater ==
Year	Title	Role	Ref.
2021–2022	Accompanying - Life is a picnic	Angel in the underworld	
