= Hur Young-ji =

South Korean singer (born 1994)

- 허영지
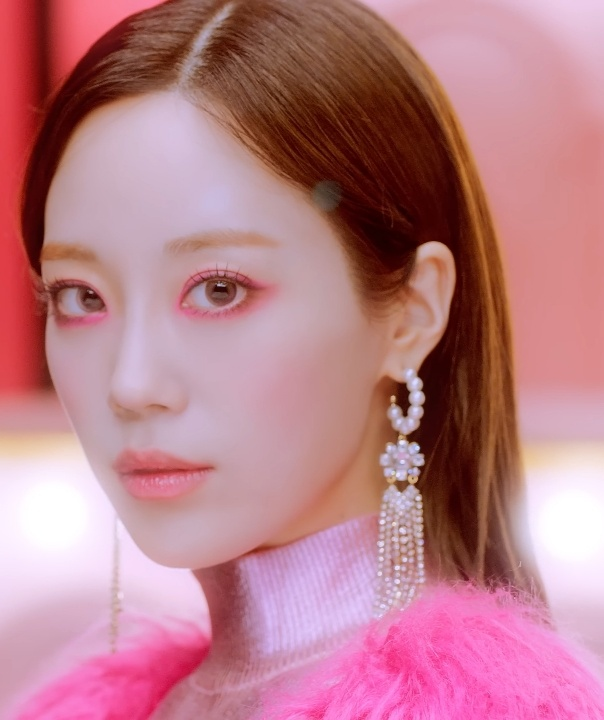
- Hur in 2022
- Born: August 30, 1994 (age 32); Goyang, South Korea
- Other names: Heo Young-ji; Youngji
- Occupations: Singer; actress; entertainer; television personality
- Awards: Full list
- Musical career
- Genre: K-pop
- Instrument: Vocals
- Years active: 2014–present
- Labels: DSP; SM C&C
- Member of: Kara

Korean name
- Hangul: 허영지
- Hanja: 許齡智
- RR: Heo Yeongji
- MR: Hŏ Yŏngji

Hur Young-ji (Korean: 허영지; born August 30, 1994), better known mononymously as Youngji, is a South Korean singer, dancer, entertainer and television personality. She is best known as a member of girl group Kara. In 2023, Hur Young-ji made her official solo debut with the release of the single "L.O.V.E."

== Career ==
=== Pre-debut ===
Hur attended School of Performing Arts Seoul. She was a former trainee at Core Contents Media alongside T-ara's ex-member Areum. She was about to debut in a new girl group but left before the girl group debuted. Later, she became a trainee at KeyEast before becoming a trainee at DSP Media.

=== 2014–2015: Debut with Kara and solo activities ===
In May 2014, after former Kara members Nicole Jung and Kang Ji-young left the group, DSP Media launched a reality TV show called Kara Project which revolved around seven trainees competing to become the new member of the group. Even though she missed 2 live performances due to a leg injury from practice, she grabbed attention from viewers and topped the voting charts.

On July 1, the live voting results commenced on 6:45 pm (KST). Hur Young-ji was proclaimed the winner with a total score of 49,591. After winning the show, she gave a winning speech saying she'll work even harder as a new member of Kara.

In September 2014, Hur was one of the new participants for the second season of the show, Roommate. She was known for her muted laughter, and on the Christmas special of Roommate, it was shown that Hur's family members have similar laughing styles as well. In the interview as a preview for being one of the new cast members for Roommate, she said that many people told her to cover her mouth while laughing, but it was very problematic and now she is more comfortable to laugh without covering her mouth.

When fellow member Goo Hara guested on Episode 9 of Roommate, she shared that she wanted Hur to be chosen as a member of Kara as she has charms that the existing members does not have and Kara feel more youthful with her.

An MBC EVERY1 representative told MBN Star on December 18, 2014, that Hur would join Hitmaker season 2 as a part of a girl group, along with After School's Lizzy, G.NA and 4minute's So-hyun. The group was later named Cham So Nyeo. The group first released their debut song teaser "올해의 주문 (Magic Words)" on February 17, followed by the full song and music video 3 days later, on February 20.

=== 2016–present: Acting career and solo work ===
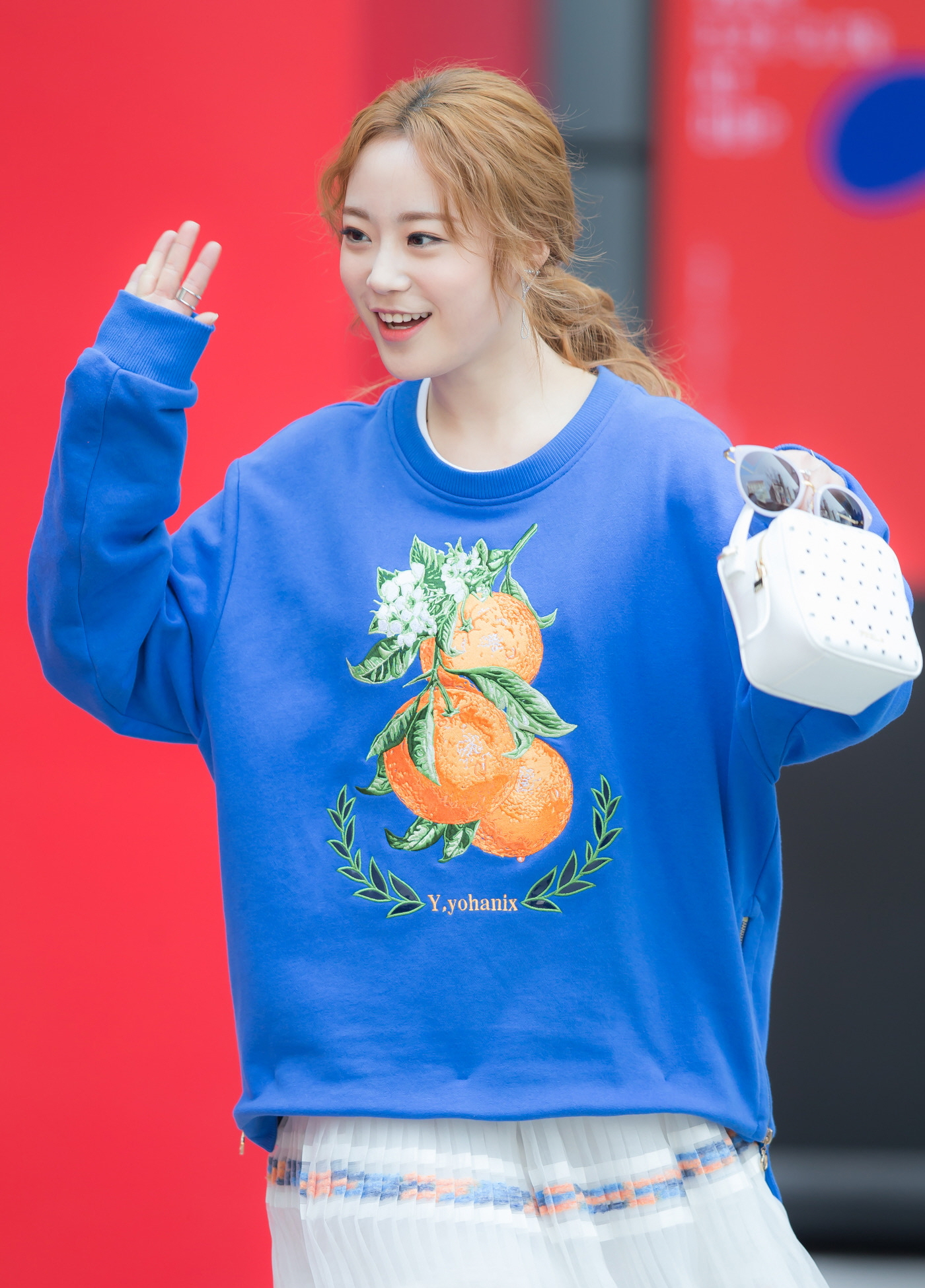
Hur at the 2016 Seoul Fashion Week

On January 15, 2016, DSP Media announced Gyuri, Seungyeon and Hara's departure from the group due to contracts expiring. The company also noted that Hur would continue her music career as a solo artist.

On April 13, Park Gyu-ri stated that the group did not disband and that the members hoped to release new albums in the future.

In May 2016, she was cast in a supporting role in the tvN drama, Another Miss Oh. She was also cast in several television programs, such as MBC's Very Private TV as a cast member, m SBS' War of Vocals - God's Voice as a panelist and EBS' Humanity Busking as a host.

On December 8, 2016, DSP Media revealed Hur as the first hidden member of their new co-ed group K.A.R.D. She promoted with the group for their first project single "OH NA NA", which was released on December 13.

On August 2, 2017, DSP Media confirmed that Hur was preparing for her solo debut in August. Her first single titled Memory Clock was released on August 25.

On December 15, 2017, MCC Entertainment released news article that revealed she will participate on 2nd song of project 'with dog'. The song titled Longing was released on the same day.

In August 2021, Hur renewed her contract with DSP Media.

In September 2023, Hur made her solo debut with first single album Toi Toi Toi, with its title track "L.O.V.E."

On September 5, 2024, Hur parted ways with DSP Media after 10 years.

On September 9, 2024, Hur signed an exclusive contract with SM C&C.

== Discography ==
=== Single albums ===
List of extended plays, with selected chart positions and sales
Title	Details	Peak chart positions	Sales
Title	Details	KOR	Sales
Toi Toi Toi	Released: September 12, 2023 (KOR); Released: December 28, 2023 (JPN); Label: DSP; Formats: CD, digital download; Track listing: 1. "L.O.V.E"; 2. "Focus"; 3. "Climax"	36	KOR: 5,679
"—" denotes items that did not chart or were not released in that region.

=== Singles ===
Title	Year	Peak chart positions	Sales	Album
Title	Year	KOR	Sales	Album
"Memory Clock" (추억시계)	2017	—	—N/a	Non-album single
"Longing" (그리움)	2017	—	—N/a	Together Puppy
"L.O.V.E."	2023	— (Note: "L.O.V.E." did not enter the Circle Digital Chart, but peaked at position 44 on component Circle Download Chart.)	—N/a	Toi Toi Toi
"—" denotes songs that did not chart or were not released in that region.

=== Collaborations ===
Song	Year	Album	Other artist(s)
"Magic Words"	2015	Non-album single	With Lizzy, G.NA and So-hyun as Chamsonyeo
"Peek-A-Boo"	2015	In Love	Duet with Park Gyu-ri
"You're So Yummy"	2015	Tasty 2: Happy Together OST	—N/a
"How About Me?"	2015	Alohara (Can You Feel It?)	Goo Hara feat Young-ji
"Fingertips Love"	2016	"Creating a Healthy Cyber World" Campaign song	With B1A4, BTOB, A-JAX, Oh My Girl, Kassy and April
"Oh NaNa"	2016	"K.A.R.D Project Vol.1"	As K.A.R.D's first hidden member

=== Production credits ===
Year	Artist	Song	Role	Album
2016	AISLE	Happy Magic Candy	Co-Lyricist	Happy Magic Candy
2017	AISLE	SAY YES	Lyricist	Say Yes
2017	Hur Young-ji	Memory Clock	Composer, Lyricist, Arranger	Memory Clock
2022	KARA	Happy Hour	Co-lyricist	MOVE AGAIN

== Filmography ==
=== Film ===
Year	Title	Role	Notes	Ref.
2015	Tasty 2: Happy Together		Korean and Japanese dubbed version	

=== Television series ===
Year	Title	Role	Notes	Ref.
2015	The Alchemist	Oh Young-ji		
2016	Another Miss Oh	Yoon An-na		
2017	Introverted Boss	Actor Hwang Young-kyu's transgender daughter	Cameo (Episode 3)	
2017	Han Yeoreum's Memory	Jung Da-jung		
2018	Are You Human?	entertainer	Cameo (Episode 1)	
2018	The Beauty Inside	Han Se-gye's fan	Cameo (Episode 13)	
2019	At Eighteen	Kim Ji-min		
2021	Park Sungshil's Death Industrial Revolution	Choi Mi-yeon	drama stage	
2021	I Want to Live Roughly	Sonia	Sitcom	

=== Television shows ===
Year	Title	Role	Notes	Ref.
2014	Kara Project	Contestant	Won the show and became a new member of Kara	
2014	The Lord Of The Ratings	MC		
2014–2015	Roommate: Season 2	Fixed cast		
2014–2015	Hitmaker Season 2	Fixed cast	As a member of Chamsonyeo with G.NA, Lizzy, and Sohyun	
2015	A Hard Day	Contestant		
2015	Game of Thrones	Contestant		
2015	Founding Star	Fixed cast	Episode 1–6	
2016	Next Door CEO	Fixed cast	Episode 1–12	
2016	Very Private TV	Fixed cast		
2016	Vocal War: God's Voice	Fixed panelist		
2016	Super Idols	Panelist	Mafia Team	
2016	Hitmaker	Cast	Season 2	
2016	Idol Intern King	Fixed cast	With Qri, Kwon So-hyun, Park Narae, Hyojung, and Han Hyeri	
2016	Humanity Busking	Host		
2017	Strong Girls	Regular cast	With Cao Lu, Luna, Park Bo-ram, and Giant Pink	
2017	Beauty Academy	Fixed MC		
2017	Beauty Summit	Fixed MC		
2017	Time Space Operation F.B.I	Fixed MC	With Lee Soo-kyung, DinDin and Heo Kyung-hwan	
2017	Shadow Singer	Fixed panelist	With Kang Hodong, JR, and others	
2018	I am CEO Season 2	Fixed panelist	With Kim Sook and Boom	
2019–2023	Comedy Big League	Host	with Shin Young-il	
2021	Change Days	Host	with Jang Do-yeon and Yang Se-chan	
2021	Adola School	Teacher	with Son Dong-pyo	
2022	One Tree Table	Cast Member		
2022	Pet Me Pick Me	Host		

=== Web shows ===
Year	Title	Role	Notes	Ref.
2019–2020	Review	Host	2019– April 8, 2020	
2020–present	Latte World	Host		
2021–present	6 Sinug's hometown	Host		
2021–present	Vivalog	Host		
2022	Change Days	Host	Season 2	

== Awards and nominations ==
Name of the award ceremony, year presented, category, nominee of the award, and the result of the nomination
Award ceremony	Year	Category	Nominee / Work	Result	Ref.
Blue Dragon Series Awards	2023	Best New Female Entertainer	Change Days	Nominated	
SBS Entertainment Awards	2014	Show Variety Female Newcomer	Roommate	Nominated	
