= Puretty =

South Korean girl group

- Origin: Seoul, South Korea
- Genres: J-pop
- Years active: 2012–2014
- Labels: DSP Media; Universal Music Japan
- Past members: Yoo Hye-in; Cho Shi-yoon; Yoon Chae-kyung; Jeon So-min; Jeon Jae-eun
- Website: purettyweb.jp

- Puretty
- Hangul: 퓨리티
- Revised Romanization: Pyuriti
- McCune–Reischauer: P'yurit'i

Puretty (Korean: 퓨리티) was a South Korean girl group formed by DSP Media. The group debuted in Japan in 2012 through the anime series Pretty Rhythm: Dear My Future, where fictionalized versions of the members appeared as the secondary cast, and their songs, "Cheki Love" and "Shuwa Shuwa Baby", were used as the series' ending theme songs. Despite plans for them to make their Korean debut, the group disbanded in January 2014, with DSP Media announcing the possibility of its members becoming part of other groups in the future.

== History ==
In January 2012, DSP Media announced that they would be debuting a sister group to Kara and Rainbow. Temporarily nicknamed the DSP Girls, the group revealed plans to debut simultaneously in both Korea and Japan through the 2012 video game and anime Pretty Rhythm: Dear My Future, with fictionalized versions of the members as the secondary cast. Puretty would sometimes feature alongside Prizmmy at the end of each episode of Pretty Rhythm: Dear My Future in a segment called "Pretty Rhythm Studios." In the Korean dub of the series, the members of Puretty had their own live-action segment titled "Charming School at Prism Stone."

Puretty held their first official performance at the Tokyo Toy Show 2012 on 15 June, promoting their debut Japanese single "Cheki Love". In August 2012, they performed at A-Nation. In January 2013, the group released their second single, "Shuwa Shuwa Baby."

== Members ==
- Yoo Hye-in (유혜인)
- Cho Shi-yoon (조시윤)
- Yoon Chae-kyung (윤채경)
- Jeon So-min (전소민)
- Jeon Jae-un (전재은)

== Discography ==
=== Japanese discography ===
==== Singles ====
Year	Information	Track listing	Peak chart positions		Sales
Year	Information	Track listing	JPN Oricon Daily	JPN Oricon Weekly	Sales
2012	"Cheki Love" (チェキ☆ラブ): Released: 5 September 2012; Language: Japanese; Label: Universal Music Japan	Track list CD Track list: 1. "Cheki Love"; 2. "Cheki Love" (Inst.); DVD Track list: 1. "Cheki Love" (Lip Ver.); 2. "Cheki Love" (Main Ver.)	41	66	Japan: 1,399 (Weekly); Japan: 1,802 (Total)
2013	"Shuwa Shuwa Baby" (シュワシュワ BABY): Released: 30 January 2013; Language: Japanese; Label: Universal Music Japan	Track list CD track list: 1. "Shuwa Shuwa BABY"; 2. "Very Very Like U" (ベリベリLike U); 3. "Shuwa Shuwa Baby" (inst.); 4. "Very Very Like U" (inst.); DVD Track list: 1. "シュワシュワ Baby(Shwa Shwa BABY)" (dance ver.); 2. "シュワシュワ Baby(Shwa Shwa BABY)" (main ver.)	62	116	JPN: 1,548 (Total)

== Filmography ==
=== Television ===
Year	Title	Role	Notes
2012	Pretty Rhythm: Dear My Future	Themselves	"Pretty Rhythm Studio" segments; also starred in "Charming School at Prism Stone" segments in Korean dub version
2013	Secret Love	Rainbow	Cameo
