= Red Moon (Kard EP) =

- Digital cover

EP by Kard
- Released: February 12, 2020
- Studio: DSP (Seoul)
- Genre: K-pop; trap
- Length: 14:26
- Language: Korean
- Label: DSP Media; Kakao M

Kard chronology
Dumb Litty (2019)	Red Moon (2020)	Way with Words (2020)

Singles from Red Moon
- 1. "Dumb Litty" Released: September 22, 2019; 2. "Red Moon" Released: February 12, 2020

Music video
- "Red Moon" on YouTube

Red Moon is the fourth extended play by South Korean co-ed group Kard. It was released on February 12, 2020, by DSP Media and distributed by Kakao M. The EP consists of five tracks, including the previously released single "Dumb Litty" and the title track of the same name.

== Release ==
The EP was released on February 12, 2020, through several music portals, including MelOn and Apple Music.

== Commercial performance ==
The EP peaked at number 4 on the Hanteo Daily Chart for its first day sales. It also charted in the top 10 for other two days, registering 1,794 copies sold.

The EP debuted and peaked at number 10 on the Gaon Album Chart for the week ending February 15, after reporting 1,453 copies sold. In its second week it fell to number 37, after reporting 299 copies sold. The EP has sold 1,752 copies in its first two weeks.

== Track listing ==
Red Moon track listing
No.	Title	Lyrics	Music	Arrangement	Length
1.	"Go Baby"	BM; J.seph; Versachoi	BM; Versachoi	BM; Versachoi	3:14
2.	"Red Moon"	Kang Eun-jeong; BM	Olof Lindskog; Gavin Jones; Hayley Aitken; 72	Ollipop	2:52
3.	"Enemy"	Kang Eun-jeong; BM; J.seph	Olof Lindskog; Hayley Aitken; 72	Ollipop	2:55
4.	"Inferno"	BM; J.seph	BM	BM; VERSACHOI	2:12
5.	"Dumb Litty"	BM; J.seph; Versachoi	BM; Versachoi	Versachoi	3:13
Total length:					14:26

== Charts ==
Sales chart performance for Red Moon
Chart (2020)	Peak position
South Korean Albums (Gaon)	10
