= DSP Media =

South Korean entertainment company

- Native name: DSP 미디어
- Formerly: Daesung Enterprise (1991–1999); DSP Entertainment (2000–2006); DSP Enti (2006–2007)
- Type: Private (1991–2021); Subsidiary (since 2021)
- Industry: Entertainment
- Genre: K-pop; R&B; EDM; Hip hop
- Founded: October 1991
- Founder: Lee Ho-yeon
- Headquarters: Room 101, Antilia Jayang, 92 Jayang-ro, Gwangjin-gu, Seoul, South Korea
- Key people: Kim Jin-woo (CEO); Min Myeong-gi (executive producer); Kim Jin-il (head of actors management)
- Parent: RBW (since 2022)
- Website: dspmedia.co.kr

DSP Media (DSP 미디어) is a South Korean entertainment company established in 1991 by Lee Ho-yeon. The company operates as a record label, talent agency, music production company, event management and concert production company, and music publishing house. In January 2022, the company was acquired by RBW.

Current artists include: Kard, Young Posse, Oh My Girl, Lu, Hyojung, Mimi, Baby Blue, Lee Jin-jae and Ahn Ye-eun as well as actors and actresses including: Kim Min, Lee Joong-ok, Lee Ji-hyun, Lee Hyung-hoon, Oh Hye-won, Lee Seo-young, Chung Ye-jin, Yoon Jung-hoon, Kim Chae-won, Ahn Seo-hyun, Seong Tae, Ju Hyun, Han Jei, Hwang Kyung-ha and Kang Dae-hyun.

== History ==
=== 1991–2009: Formation and early success ===
Daesung Enterprise was founded in September 1991 by Lee Ho Yeon to provide entertainment to the public.

In the late 1990s, Daesung Enterprise saw significant success, and with the success of groups like Sechs Kies, formed in 1997, and Fin.K.L., formed in 1998, it was considered one of the top entertainment labels in South Korea, alongside SM Entertainment. Click-B was formed in August 1999.

In February 1999, the company was renamed DSP Entertainment. After merging with Hoshin Textile Company (호신섬유) in March 2006, DSP Entertainment was renamed DSP Enti.

In 2002, Ha Hyun-gon, Yoo Ho-suk and No Min-hyuk of Click-B left DSP.

In 2006, Fin.K.L members departed DSP Media.

In September 2008, DSP Enti was renamed DSP Media.

=== 2010–2020: Change in leadership ===
In March 2010, Lee Ho-yeon suffered a stroke, after which his wife, Choi Mi-kyung began running the company. Lee Ho-yeon was considered a major component of the group's success, which began to see a decline following his retirement from the company due to his stroke. Following Choi becoming president of DSP, several members of the girl group Kara filed a lawsuit to end their contract with DSP.

In August 2015, DSP debuted girl group April, with former member of Puretty, Jeon Somin joined in the line-up and then left the group in November 2015. In October 2016, another former member of Puretty, Yoon Chae-kyung were added as a new member of the group.

On January 15, 2016 KARA officially disbanded following the expiration of Park Gyuri, Han Seungyeon and Goo Hara's contracts, while Heo Youngji remained with DSP as a soloist.

In July 2017, DSP debuted four-member co-ed group Kard, with former member of DSP girl group Puretty and April, Jeon So-min joined in the line-up.

In the early morning of February 14, 2018, Lee Ho Yeon died at the age of 64, after a long battle with an illness.

On January 31, 2020, DSP Media announced the launch of official accounts including Twitter and V Live for their upcoming boy group DSP N, including former X1's member, Son Dong-pyo.

=== 2021–present: Acquisition and business expansion ===
DSP N later debuted as Mirae on March 17, 2021.

On January 26, 2022, it was announced that DSP Media had 39.1% of its shares bought by RBW, which houses idol groups such as Mamamoo, Oneus, Vromance, Onewe and Purple Kiss. DSP Media will be merged into RBW as a subsidiary.

On December 14, 2022, DSP Media announced the acquisition of Goodfellas Entertainment, with their producer Lee Seok-joo, composer Lee Yul-i, singer Lee Jin-jae and duo Baby Blue joining DSP, whereas their CEO Min Myeong-gi also appointment as Lead Producer of DSP.

On May 13, 2023, Soloist Ahn Ye-eun signed with DSP.

On June 1, 2023, DSP was announced to expansions actor management business with acquisitions of actor agency Jikim Entertainment and Urban Works Media, the latter was acquired by RBW in December 2022. Jikim’s former CEO Kim Jin-il would be leading the actors' department under DSP.

On June 22, 2023, DSP Media announced the debut of a new five-member girl group in collaboration with Beats Entertainment around the second half of the year, their first girl group since April (2015). The name of the group, Young Posse, was revealed on July 12. The group first introduced at the RBW 2023 Summer Fes ~Over The Rainbow~ in Seoul on July 16 and eventually debuted on October 18.

In August 2023, actor Kim Min signed with DSP Media. Oh My Girl would switch companies from WM Entertainment to DSP Media in August 2026.

== Affiliated artists ==
=== Recording artists ===
Groups

- Gavy NJ
- Kard
- Young Posse
- Oh My Girl

Duos

- Baby Blue

Soloists

- BM
- J.Seph
- Somin
- Jiwoo
- Son Dong-pyo
- Lee Jin-jae
- Ahn Ye-eun
- Kim Yuna
- OYEON
- H:CODE
- Lee Hyun-seok
- Ravn
- Hyojung
- Mimi

=== Producers & songwriters ===
- Min Myeong-gi (Lead Producer)
- Lee Seok-joo
- Lee Yul-i

=== Actors ===
- Lee Ji-hyun
- Lee Joong-ok
- Lee Hyung-hoon
- Oh Hye-won
- Chung Ye-jin
- Yoon Jung-hoon
- Ahn Seo-hyun
- Lee Seo-young
- Ju Hyeon
- Seong Tae
- Hwang Kyung-ha
- Han Jei
- Kim Chae-won
- Kim Min (2023–present)

== Former artists ==
Recording artists

- ZAM (1992–1995)
- CO CO (1994–1995)
- MUE (1994–1999)
- IDOL (1995–1997)
- Mountain (1996–?)
- Sechs Kies (1997–2000)
- Fin.K.L (1998–2002, 2005)
  - Lee Hyori (1998–2006)
  - Ock Joo-hyun (1998–2006)
  - Lee Jin (1998–2005)
  - Sung Yu-ri (1998–2005)
- Leeds (1999–2000)
- Click-B (1999–2006)
  - Oh Jong-hyuk (1999–2020)
- Shyne (2004–2007)
- SS501 (2005–2010)
- Sunha (2007–2009)
- A'st1 (2008–2009)
- KARA (2007–2016)
  - Kim Sung-hee (2007–2008)
  - Nicole Jung (2007–2014)
  - Kang Ji-young (2008–2014)
  - Park Gyu-ri (2007–2016)
  - Han Seung-yeon (2007–2016)
  - Goo Hara (2008–2016)
  - Heo Young-ji (2014–2024)
- Rainbow (2009–2016, 2019)
- Puretty (2012–2014)
  - Yoo Hye-in (2012–2014)
  - Jeon Jae-eun (2012–2014)
  - Cho Shi-yoon
- Ahn So-jin (2012–2015)
- A-Jax (2012–2019)
  - Sungmin (2012–2016)
  - Jaehyung (2012–2016)
  - Jihu (2012–2016)
- Kasper (2016–2018)
- April (2015–2022)
  - Chaewon (2015–2022)
  - Naeun (2015–2022)
  - Yena (2015–2022)
  - Jinsol (2015–2022)
  - Chaekyung (2012–2022) (Note: In 2012 Yoon Chae-kyung originally debuted with DSP girl group Puretty in Japan before finally disbanding in 2014 and remained with the agency until finally being added as a new member in April 2016.)
  - Rachel (2016–2023) (Note: Rachel's contract has been transferred to RBW, the parent company, in June 2023.)
- Mirae (2021–2024)
  - Lien (2021–2024)
  - Lee Jun-hyuk (2021–2024)
  - Yoo Dou-hyun (2021–2024)
  - Khael (2021–2024)
  - Park Si-young (2021–2024)
  - Jang Yu-bin (2021–2024)

Actors

- Park So-hyun
- Oh Hyun-kyung
- Kim Hyu Soo (1997–?)
- Jung Hye Won (2010–?)
- Park Jong-chan (2013–?)
- Choi Bae-young
- Baek Seungdo
- Song Chan-ik
- Lee Hyun-joo (2015–2021) (Note: In 2015 Lee Hyun-joo debuted with April before left the group in 2016 to pursue acting career and part ways with the agency in 2021.)
- Kang Dae-hyun (2022–2023) (Note: In July 2023, Kang Dae-hyun joined the lineup for RBW's upcoming boy group New ID.)

== Filmography ==
- Emergency Act 19 (Film, 2002)
- Drama Three Leaf Clover (SBS, 2005)
- My girl (SBS, 2005)
- She (SBS, 2006)
- Yeon Gae So Mun (SBS, 2006)
- Surgeon Bong Dal-hee (SBS, 2007)
- Bad couple (SBS, 2007)
- Heartbreak Library (Film, 2008)
- Making the Star (MBC, 2012)
- Kara Project (MBC, 2014)
