= Best Girls =

- Version B Cover

Greatest hits album by Kara
- Released: November 27, 2013
- Recorded: 2008–2013
- Genre: J-pop; K-pop
- Length: 1:32:25
- Language: Japanese; Korean
- Label: Universal Sigma

Kara chronology
Full Bloom (2013)	Best Girls (2013)	Day & Night (2014)

Singles from Best Girls
- 1. "French Kiss" Released: November 27, 2013

Best Girls is the third greatest hits album by South Korean girl group Kara, released on November 27, 2013, in three different editions. French Kiss was released on November 27, 2013, as the only single from the album. The album contains 25 songs in both Japanese and Korean, including hits such as Mister, Jet Coaster Love, and Step. It was the final album to feature former members, Nicole Jung and Kang Jiyoung until their return to the group in 2022.

== Background ==
Information regarding the album was revealed in late October, when Universal Music, and various blogs began to announce it. The album was announced in three different versions: 2CD+2DVD Type A, 2CD+DVD Type B, and 2CD Type C. Type A comes with two CDs with a total of 25 songs. Version B comes with an additional DVD featuring thirty five music videos including the extra bonus close up versions. Finally, type A also includes twenty videos of songs sung by KARA live in concert. Type A lists for ¥8,500, type B for ¥5,500, and type C for ¥2,980.

== Track listing ==
Disc one
No.	Title	Lyrics	Music	Length
1.	"Mister" (ミスター)			3:12
2.	"Jumpin'" (ジャンピン)			2:58
3.	"SOS"			4:42
4.	"Jet Coaster Love" (ジェットコースターラブ)	Natsumi Watanabe, Yu Shimoji	Hwang Seong-je	3:40
5.	"Ima, Okuritai 'Arigatō'" (今、贈りたい「ありがとう」)	S. Isogai	S. Isogai	5:51
6.	"Go Go Summer" (GO GO サマー！)	Y. Shimoji	Han Sang-won, Lee Sang-ho & Kimzart	3:20
7.	"Girls Be Ambitious!" (ガールズ ビー アンビシャス！)	PA-NON	Hwang S.J.	3:36
8.	"Winter Magic" (ウィンターマジック)	Simon Isogai	ArmySlick, M.I.	5:52
9.	"Speed Up" (スピード アップ)	Emyli	Mohombi, Ivar Lisinski, Ninos Hanna, Robert Hanna	3:21
10.	"Girl's Power" (ガールズ パワー)	PA-NON	Han Sang-won	3:57
11.	"Electric Boy" (エレクトリックボーイ)	Line Krogholm, Shalamon Baskin, Mikko Tamminen	Line Krogholm, Shalamon Baskin	3:22
12.	"Bye Bye Happy Days!" (バイバイ ハッピーデイズ)	Simon Isogai	Simon Isogai	4:36
13.	"Thank You Summer Love" (サンキュー サマーラブ)	Yu Shimoji	Takumi Masanori	3:47
14.	"French Kiss" (フレンチキス)			4:16
Total length:				56:30

All tracks are written by Song Soo-yun, Han Jae-ho and Kim Seung-soo, except "Pandora" written by Song Soo-yun, Yue, Han Jae-ho, Kim Seung-soo.

Disc two
No.	Title	Length
1.	"Rock U"	3:34
2.	"Pretty Girl"	3:14
3.	"Honey"	3:40
4.	"Wanna"	3:05
5.	"Mister (미스터)"	3:12
6.	"Lupin (루팡)"	3:10
7.	"Umbrella"	3:24
8.	"Jumping (점핑)"	2:58
9.	"Step"	3:21
10.	"Pandora"	3:11
11.	"Damaged Lady (숙녀가 못 돼)"	3:06
Total length:		35:55

DVD 1: Best Clips
No.	Title	Length
1.	"Rock U" (music video)
2.	"Pretty Girl" (music video)
3.	"Honey" (music video)
4.	"Wanna" (music video)
5.	"Lupin" (music video)
6.	"ミスター (Mister)" (music video)
7.	"ジャンピン (Jumpin')" (music video)
8.	"Jumping" (music video)
9.	"ジェットコースターラブ (Jet Coaster Love)" (music video)
10.	"今、贈りたい「ありがとう」 (Ima, Okurita Arigatou)" (music video)
11.	"GO GO サマー！ (Go Go Summer!)" (music video)
12.	"Step" (music video)
13.	"ウィンターマジック (Winter Magic)" (music video)
14.	"スピード アップ (Speed Up)" (music video)
15.	"ガールズ パワー (Girl's Power)" (music video)
16.	"Pandora" (music video)
17.	"エレクトリックボーイ (Electric Boy)" (music video)
18.	"オリオン (Orion)" (music video)
19.	"バイバイ ハッピーデイズ (Bye Bye Happy Days!)" (music video)
20.	"サンキュー サマーラブ (Thank You Summer Love)" (music video)
21.	"Damaged Lady" (music video)
22.	"フレンチキス (French Kiss)" (music video)

DVD 1: bonus
No.	Title	Length
1.	"ミスター" (Mister; dance shot ver.)
2.	"ジャンピン" (Jumpin'; dance shot ver.)
3.	"ジェットコースターラブ" (Jet Coaster Love; dance shot ver.)
4.	"GO GO サマー！" (Go Go Summer!; dance shot ver.)
5.	"ウィンターマジック" (Winter Magic; close-up ver.)
6.	"スピード アップ" (Speed Up; close-up ver.)
7.	"スピード アップ" (Speed Up; another ver.)
8.	"ガールズ パワー" (Girl's Power; dance shot ver.)
9.	"ガールズ パワー" (Girl's Power close-up ver.)
10.	"エレクトリックボーイ" (Electric Boy; dance shot ver.)
11.	"オリオン" (Orion; close-up ver.)
12.	"バイバイ ハッピーデイズ" (Bye Bye Happy Days!; dance shot ver.)
13.	"サンキュー サマーラブ" (Thank You Summer Love; dance shot ver.)

DVD 2: Best Lives
No.	Title	Length
1.	"Pandora" (from Karasia 2013 Happy New Year In Tokyo Dome)
2.	"スピード アップ" (Speed up; from Karasia 2013 Happy New Year In Tokyo Dome)
3.	"ジャンピン" (Jumpin'; (from Kara 1st Japan Tour 2012 Karasia)
4.	"ドリーミングガール" (Dreaming Girl; from Karasia 2013 Happy New Year In Tokyo Dome)
5.	"アンブレラ" (Umbrella; from Kara 1st Japan Tour 2012 Karasia)
6.	"ガールズ パワー" (Girl Power; from Karasia 2013 Happy New Year In Tokyo Dome)
7.	"キスミー トゥナイト" (Kiss Me Tonight; from Karasia 2013 Happy New Year In Tokyo Dome)
8.	"Pretty Girl" (from kara 1st japan tour 2012 karasia)
9.	"ウィンターマジック" (Winter Magic; from Karasia 2013 Happy New Year In Tokyo Dome)
10.	"オリオン" (Orion; from Karasia 2013 Happy New Year In Tokyo Dome)
11.	"ミッシング" (Missing; from Kara 1st Japan Tour 2012 Karasia)
12.	"今、贈りたい「ありがとう」" (Ima, Okurita Arigatou; from Kara 1st Japan Tour 2012 Karasia)
13.	"Lupin" (from Karasia 2013 Happy New Year In Tokyo Dome)
14.	"Step" (from Kara 1st Japan Tour 2012 Karasia)
15.	"Let It Go" (from Kara 1st Japan Tour 2012 Karasia)
16.	"エレクトリックボーイ" (Electric Boy; from Karasia 2013 Happy New Year In Tokyo Dome)
17.	"GO GO サマー！" (GO GO Summer!; from Karasia 2013 Happy New Year In Tokyo Dome)
18.	"ジェットコースターラブ" (Jet Coaster Love; from Karasia 2013 Happy New Year In Tokyo Dome)
19.	"ミスター" (Mr.; from Kara 1st Japan Tour 2012 Karasia))
20.	"Rock U" (from Karasia 2013 Happy New Year In Tokyo Dome)

== Charts ==
=== Oricon Chart ===
Oricon Chart	Peak	Debut sales	Sales total	Chart run
Daily Singles Chart	4	42,101 (weekly)	65,228+	6 weeks
Weekly Albums Chart	5	42,101 (weekly)	65,228+	6 weeks
Monthly Albums Chart	13	42,101 (weekly)	65,228+	6 weeks
Yearly Albums Chart	126	42,101 (weekly)	65,228+	6 weeks

=== Other charts ===
Chart	Peak position
Billboard Japan Top Albums	4

== Certifications ==
Region	Certification	Certified units/sales
Japan (RIAJ)	Gold	100,000^{^}
^{^} Shipments figures based on certification alone.

== Release history ==
Country	Date	Format	Label
Japan	November 27, 2013	Ringtone	Universal Sigma
Japan	November 27, 2013	CD, Digital download	Universal Sigma
