= Thank You Summer Love =

- Regular Edition cover. L to R: Jiyoung, Seungyeon, Gyuri, Nicole, Hara.

Single by Kara

from the album Fantastic Girls
- B-side: "Hanabi"; "Love Letter"
- Released: July 24, 2013
- Genre: Dance-pop
- Length: 3:47
- Label: Universal Sigma
- Songwriters: Yu Shimoji, Takumi Masanori

Kara Japanese singles chronology
"Bye Bye Happy Days!" (2013)	"Thank You Summer Love" (2013)	"French Kiss" (2013)

"Thank You Summer Love" (サンキュー サマーラブ, Sankyū Samārabu) is the ninth Japanese single by South Korean girl group Kara and the second single from their fourth Japanese album Fantastic Girls. It was released on July 24, 2013 with seven editions. It debuted at number 2 in the Oricon Daily Singles Chart selling 48,479 copies, the group's highest first day sales in the chart.

== Background ==
The single was announced on June 18 by the group's Korean label, DSP Media, with track list and infos about all editions of the single. On June 24, jacket covers of all editions and the bonus track of CD only edition were revealed.

=== Editions ===
- Limited CD+DVD (UMCK-9631): The limited CD+DVD edition includes the CD standard track list and a DVD including music video of "Thank You Summer Love", a dance version and making of it.
- Regular CD only (UMCK-9632): The regular CD only edition includes only the CD single itself. First Press of it includes a bonus Korean track, titled "Love Letter". The song was used as ending theme song for the group's anime Kara The Animation.
- Limited Solo CD+DVD (PDCS-5902 – 5906): The limited solo CD+DVD editions includes the standard CD single track list and a DVD featuring solo shots and making of from the music video of "Thank You Summer Love", one edition per member. These editions of the single were only sold at Universal Music Japan's digital store.

== Composition ==
"Thank You Summer Love" was written by Yu Shimoji, composed by Takumi Masanori and arranged by Masanori and ArmySlick. Yu Shimoji also wrote the group's first summer-themed song "Go Go Summer!". "Hanabi", B-side of the single, was written by Litz, NA.ZU.NA, composed by NA.ZU.NA, PRINCE.YK and arranged by PRINCE.YK and ArmySlick. "Love Letter" was composed and written by Kim Won-hyun.

== Music video ==
A short version of the music video of "Thank You Summer Love" was released on July 19, on Kara's Japan YouTube account, along with a digest of solo versions from the music video. The full music video premiered on the channel Space Shower TV on the same day. The music video show the girls camping. It also shows the members doing different things: Hara and Ji-young playing together, Gyuri looking a postcard, Seung-yeon reading and writing in a book and Nicole cooking. It also includes scenes of the girls performing the song in a white studio with big blue pinwheels on the background. Scenes from the music video of the song "Go Go Summer!" were also shown from a video projector. In the end, during the night, it shows the girls toasting corns in a campfire and watching the fireworks in the sky. The music video was directed by Joo Hee-sun.

== Track listing ==
Limited editions and CD only regular edition:
No.	Title	Lyrics	Music	Arrangement	Length
1.	"Thank You Summer Love" (サンキュー サマーラブ; Sankyū Samārabu)	Yu Shimoji	Takumi Masanori	Takumi Masanori, ArmySlick	3:47
2.	"Hanabi" (Japanese: 花火; "fireworks")	Litz, NA.ZU.NA	NA.ZU.NA, PRINCE.YK	PRINCE.YK, ArmySlick	5:04
3.	"Thank You Summer Love" (instrumental)				3:44
4.	"Hanabi" (instrumental)				5:04
Total length:					17:38

Bonus Track (CD only first press edition):
No.	Title	Lyrics	Music	Arrangement	Length
5.	"Love Letter"	Kim Won-hyun	Kim Won-hyun	Kim Won-hyun	3:38
Total length:					20:06

DVD (limited CD+DVD edition):
No.	Title	Length
1.	"Thank You Summer Love" (music video)
2.	"Thank You Summer Love" (music video – dance version)
3.	"Thank You Summer Love" (music video – making of)

DVD (limited CD+DVD Gyuri edition):
No.	Title	Length
1.	"Thank You Summer Love" (music video – Gyuri version)
2.	"Thank You Summer Love" (music video – making of (Gyuri version))

DVD (limited CD+DVD Seung-yeon edition):
No.	Title	Length
1.	"Thank You Summer Love" (music video – Seung-yeon version)
2.	"Thank You Summer Love" (music video – making of (Seung-yeon version))

DVD (limited CD+DVD Nicole edition):
No.	Title	Length
1.	"Thank You Summer Love" (music video – Nicole version)
2.	"Thank You Summer Love" (music video – making of (Nicole version))

DVD (Limited CD+DVD Hara edition):
No.	Title	Length
1.	"Thank You Summer Love" (music video – Hara version)
2.	"Thank You Summer Love" (music video – making of (Hara version))

DVD (limited CD+DVD Ji-young edition):
No.	Title	Length
1.	"Thank You Summer Love" (music video – Ji-young version)
2.	"Thank You Summer Love" (music video – making of (Ji-young version))

== Chart performance ==
=== Oricon chart ===
Oricon Chart	Peak	Debut sales	Sales total
Daily Singles Chart	2	48,479	75,884+
Weekly Singles Chart	2	69,416	75,884+
Monthly Singles Chart	9	72,609	75,884+
Yearly Singles Chart	97	75,884	75,884+

=== Billboard charts ===
Chart	Peak position
Billboard Japan Hot 100	1
Billboard Japan Hot Singles Sales	1
Billboard Japan Hot Top Airplay	27
Billboard Japan Adult Contemporary Airplay	25

== Release history ==
Country	Date	Format	Label
Japan	July 17, 2013	Ringtone	Universal Sigma
Japan	July 24, 2013	Digital download, CD single	Universal Sigma
