= French Kiss (Kara song) =

- Regular Edition cover

Single by Kara

from the album Best Girls
- B-side: "Girlfriend"
- Released: November 27, 2013
- Genre: Dance-pop
- Length: 4:08
- Label: Universal Sigma
- Songwriter: Shirose
- Producers: Shirose; Heroism; Hikki

Kara Japanese singles chronology
"Thank You Summer Love" (2013)	"French Kiss" (2013)	"Mamma Mia" (2014)

"French Kiss" (フレンチキス, Furenchi Kisu) is the tenth Japanese single by South Korean girl group Kara. It was released on November 27, 2013 with seven editions. It serves as the lead single for their compilation album Best Girls, which was released on the same day. It was the last single to feature members Nicole Jung and Kang Jiyoung, after their departure from the group's Korean agency, DSP Media, on 2014, before their return for the group reunion in 2022.

The title track showcases KARA's vibrant vocals and energetic choreography, creating a lively and entertaining music experience.

== Background ==
The initial rumors about the single's release started in October, when a South Korean digital store put the single and the album Best Girls for pre-order, with the release day stated for November 27. They were later confirmed by the group's Korean label, DSP Media, and by their Japanese label, Universal Sigma, on October 31. With the confirmation, they revealed track lists, jacket covers and prices for both single and album.

=== Editions ===
- Limited CD+DVD (UMCK-9641): The limited CD+DVD edition includes the CD single and a DVD including music video of "French Kiss", a close-up version and making of it.
- Regular CD only (UMCK-5450): The regular CD only edition includes only the CD single itself.
- Limited Solo CD+DVD (PDCS-5907 - 5911): The limited solo CD+DVD editions includes the standard CD single track list and a DVD featuring solo shots and making of from the music video of "French Kiss", one edition per member. These editions of the single were only sold at Universal Music Japan's digital store.

== Composition ==
"French Kiss" was written by Shirose, who also composed the song with Heroism and Hikki. "Girlfriend", b-side of the single, was written by Glory Face, who also composed and arranged the song, and Jam-9. This is the first time that a Japanese single of Kara does not include a bonus track.

== Music video ==
A short version of the music video of "French Kiss" was released in November 12, on Kara's Japan YouTube account. The full version aired in November 15, on the music TV channel M-On!. It was directed by Hong Won-ki.

== Track listing ==
All editions track list
No.	Title	Lyrics	Music	Arrangement	Length
1.	"French Kiss" (フレンチキス; Furenchi Kisu)	Shirose	Shirose; Heroism; Hikki	Shirose; Heroism	4:08
2.	"Girlfriend" (ガールフレンド; Gārufurendo)	Glory Face; Jam-9	Glory Face	Glory Face	3;25
3.	"French Kiss" (instrumental)				4:07
4.	"Girlfriend" (instrumental)				3:25
Total length:					15:03

DVD (limited CD+DVD edition):
No.	Title	Length
1.	"French Kiss" (music video)
2.	"French Kiss" (music video – close–up version)
3.	"French Kiss" (music video – making of)

DVD (limited CD+DVD Gyuri edition):
No.	Title	Length
1.	"French Kiss" (music video – Gyuri version)
2.	"French Kiss" (music video – making of Gyuri version)

DVD (limited CD+DVD Seung-yeon edition):
No.	Title	Length
1.	"French Kiss" (music video – Seung-yeon version)
2.	"French Kiss" (music video – making of Seung-yeon version)

DVD (limited CD+DVD Nicole edition):
No.	Title	Length
1.	"French Kiss" (music video – Nicole version)
2.	"French Kiss" (music video – making of Nicole version)

DVD (limited CD+DVD Hara edition):
No.	Title	Length
1.	"French Kiss" (music video – Hara version)
2.	"French Kiss" (music video – making of Hara version)

DVD (limited CD+DVD Ji-young edition):
No.	Title	Length
1.	"French Kiss" (music video – Ji-young version)
2.	"French Kiss" (music video – making of Ji-young version)

== Chart performance ==
=== Oricon chart ===
Oricon Chart	Peak	Debut sales	Sales total
Daily Singles Chart	4	32,677 (weekly)	35,505+
Weekly Singles Chart	7	32,677 (weekly)	35,505+
Monthly Singles Chart	19	32,677 (weekly)	35,505+
Yearly Singles Chart	206	32,677 (weekly)	35,505+

=== Billboard charts ===
Chart	Peak position
Billboard Japan Hot 100	24
Billboard Japan Hot Singles Sales	9
Billboard Japan Hot Top Airplay	83
Billboard Japan Adult Contemporary Airplay	100

== Release history ==
Country	Date	Format	Label
Japan	November 20, 2013	Ringtone	Universal Sigma
Japan	November 27, 2013	Digital download, CD single	Universal Sigma
