= Fantastic Girls =

- Version B cover

Studio album by Kara
- Released: August 28, 2013
- Recorded: 2013
- Genre: J-pop; dance-pop
- Length: 41:55
- Language: Japanese
- Label: Universal Sigma

Kara chronology
Kara Solo Collection (2012)	Fantastic Girls (2013)	Full Bloom (2013)

Singles from Fantastic Girls
- 1. "Bye Bye Happy Days!" Released: March 27, 2013; 2. "Thank You Summer Love" Released: July 24, 2013

Fantastic Girls is the fourth Japanese studio album and seventh overall studio album release by South Korean girl group Kara on August 28, 2013, by Universal Sigma. This marks their final Japanese album featuring Jung Nicole and Kang Jiyoung.

== Background ==
Details surrounding the album were accidentally leaked by a South Korean music store, who listed the album on their website before Universal Sigma had announced it. On July 29, 2013, Universal Sigma announced that Kara would be releasing a fourth Japanese album in August. It was announced that the album would be released in three editions.

=== Editions ===
Regular CD Only includes the first press edition includes a bonus track, "Happy Happy Love." CD+DVD Type A includes a DVD featuring footage of the group's Japanese fan meeting "Kamilia School," held at Yokohama Arena on June 23, 2013. CD+DVD Type B includes a DVD featuring the group's U-Express live performance on March 2, 2013.

== Singles ==
Two songs from the album were released as singles.

The first single, "Bye Bye Happy Days!", was released on March 27, 2013. The single debuted at number three on Oricon's daily singles chart selling 25,552 physical copies. By the end of the week, the single had risen to the number two spot on the Oricon weekly singles chart and sold a total of 65,588 physical copies. It debuted at number two on the Billboard Japan Hot 100 and Billboard Japan Hot Single sales chart. The single charted for 7 weeks and has currently sold over 78,000 copies in Japan.

The second and final single from the album, "Thank You Summer Love", was released on July 24, 2013. The single debuted at number two on Oricon's daily singles chart selling 48,479 copies, thus becoming the group's highest first day sales for a single. The single maintained its number two position and debuted at number two on the Oricon weekly singles chart selling 69,416 copies. "Thank You Summer Love" also debuted at number one on the Billboard Japan Hot 100 and Billboard Japan Hot Single sales chart, becoming Kara's second number one on both charts.

== Track listing ==
All editions track list
No.	Title	Lyrics	Music	Length
1.	"Thank You Summer Love" (サンキュー サマーラブ)	Yu Shimoji	Takumi Masanori	3:47
2.	"Burn! Burn! Heartbeat" (バーン!バーン!ハートビート)	Faya	Mitsu.J	4:05
3.	"Bye Bye Happy Days!" (バイバイ ハッピーデイズ!)	Simon Isogai	Simon Isogai	4:36
4.	"Rescue Me" (レスキューミー)	Hong Ji-sang, Yu Shimoji	Hong Ji-sang	3:18
5.	"Pop Star"	Satoko Aida	Kim Tesung, Andrew Choi, Kei Kwang Wook Lim	3:16
6.	"Promise" (プロミス)	Shihomi	Jeff Miyahara, Erik Lidbom	4:47
7.	"Endless Night" (エンドレスナイト)	Yuko Ebine	Tomoyuki Tajiri, Naoyuki Honzawa	3:56
8.	"Ichibanni Watashio Dakishimete" (一番にわたしを抱きしめて; Hold Me)	Simon Isogai	Simon Isogai	5:46
9.	"Hanabi" (Japanese: 花火; "Fireworks")	Litz, NA.ZU.NA	NA.ZU.NA, PRINCE.YK	5:06
10.	"My Boy" (マイボーイ)	Kim Won-hyun, Kaori Moriwaka	Kim Won-hyun	3:25
Total length:				41:55

Limited edition type C bonus track
No.	Title	Lyrics	Music	Length
11.	"Happy Happy Love" (ハッピー ハッピー ラブ)	Tatsuji Ueda	Kim Tesung, Cha Cha Malone, Casper	2:57

DVD (limited edition type A)
No.	Title	Length
1.	"Period 1 "Art"" (Kamilia School; Kara Fan Meeting 2013)
2.	"Period 2 "Social Studies"" (Kamilia School; Kara Fan Meeting 2013)
3.	"Classroom Move" (Kamilia School; Kara Fan Meeting 2013)
4.	"Period 3 "Physical Education"" (Kamilia School; Kara Fan Meeting 2013)
5.	"Summary" (Kamilia School; Kara Fan Meeting 2013)
6.	"Mister" (Kamilia School; Kara Fan Meeting 2013)
7.	"Honey" (Kamilia School; Kara Fan Meeting 2013)
8.	"Jet Coaster Love" (Kamilia School; Kara Fan Meeting 2013)
9.	"Ima, Okuritai 'Arigatō" (Kamilia School; Kara Fan Meeting 2013)
10.	"Bye Bye Happy Days!" (Kamilia School; Kara Fan Meeting 2013)
11.	"Step" (Kamilia School; Kara Fan Meeting 2013)

DVD (limited edition type B)
No.	Title	Length
1.	"Mister" (Live from "U-Express Live 2013")
2.	"Jumpin'" (Live from "U-Express Live 2013")
3.	"Bye Bye Happy Days!" (Live from "U-Express Live 2013")
4.	"Orion" (Live from "U-Express Live 2013")
5.	"Jet Coaster Love" (Live from "U-Express Live 2013")
6.	"Go Go Summer!" (Live from "U-Express Live 2013")
7.	"Electric Boy" (Live from "U-Express Live 2013")
8.	"Girl's Power" (Live from "U-Express Live 2013")

== Charts ==
=== Weekly charts ===
Chart (2013)	Peak position
Japanese Albums (Oricon)	3
Japanese Top Album Sales (Billboard)	3

=== Year-end charts ===
Chart (2013)	Position
Japanese Albums (Oricon)	111

== Sales ==
Region	Certification	Certified units/sales
Japan	—	57,041

== Release history ==
Country	Date	Format	Label
Japan	August 21, 2013	Ringtone	Universal Sigma
Japan	August 28, 2013	CD; digital download	Universal Sigma
