= Isogai =

Isogai (written: 磯貝, 磯谷 or 礒貝) is a Japanese surname. Notable people with the surname include:

- Hajime Isogai (磯貝 一, 1871–1947), Japanese judoka
- Hiromitsu Isogai (礒貝 洋光, born 1969), Japanese footballer
- Rensuke Isogai (磯谷 廉介, 1886–1967), Japanese general
- Simon Isogai (磯貝 サイモン, born 1983), Japanese singer and musician
- Yorihide Isogai (磯貝 頼秀, born 1940), Japanese sport wrestler

== Fictional characters ==
- Yūma Isogai (磯貝 悠馬), a character in the manga series Assassination Classroom
- Gendō Isogai (磯谷 ゲンドウ), a character in the anime series Little Battlers Experience WARS

== See also ==
- 8251 Isogai, a Mars-crossing asteroid
