= Love Honey =

Studio album by Ai Otsuka
- Released: April 12, 2017
- Genre: J-pop, electronic music, jazz
- Label: Avex Trax
- Producer: aio; Max Matsuura (exec.)

Ai Otsuka chronology
Love Tricky (2015)	Love Honey (2017)	Ai Am Best, Too (2019)

Singles from Love Honey
- 1. "Hibi, Ikiteireba" Released: July 6, 2016 (digital); 2. "Watashi" Released: February 15, 2017

Love Honey is the eighth studio album by Japanese singer-songwriter Ai Otsuka. It was released on April 12, 2017, through Avex Trax.

== Development and concept ==
For her eighth studio album, Otsuka aimed to create a record that blended the approach of her previous release, Love Tricky (i.e. creating mainly electronic music songs), with the essence of her earlier musical identity (i.e., using her own compositions, as opposed to co-writing). Reflecting on the creative direction, Otsuka explained that she wanted the album to feel “like a nice mix of who I was before and what came out of Love Tricky.” She reunited again with Noboru Abe of Studio Apartment -who had produced Love Tricky- to explore how his sensibilities would influence her music in the role of arranger. “I was curious,” she said, “to see what would happen if I used him as the arranger for my own songs.” The collaboration proved both experimental and fruitful, with Otsuka noting, “It ended up being a nicely balanced blend.” She also described Love Honey as an album that “opened a few new doors” for her creatively, signaling a continued evolution in her sound.

In creating Love Honey, Otsuka approached the album as both a creative and personal reckoning. She described the work as containing “cooler-sounding songs” and reflecting a broader vocal range, while also clarifying her artistic identity: “I feel like I clearly defined the position of the things I have always liked. The songs really showcase what I genuinely love.” At the core of the album was a conscious effort to reconnect with her musical self. “Facing music again required the process of accepting myself,” Otsuka shared, admitting that her artistic spirit had been at risk: “If I didn’t learn to like myself, even my life as an artist might have ended.”

Otsuka's aim on Love Honey was to explore the complexities of womanhood, and serving as a deeper exploration into her own identity as a woman. Commenting on the leading track of the album, "Honey", (Note: Otsuka previously released another song entitled "Honey", which is included on her first album, Love Punch. However, this song's title is originally written in katakana (ハニー) and is completely different to the one included on this record.) Otsuka declared it carries a deeply personal and metaphorical theme on this matter. Otsuka explained that the core of the song revolves around the idea of the womb, and the complex symbolism of welcoming and letting go. She described wanting to capture the feeling of the womb in the song: “I wanted to create a feeling that reflects the essence of the womb... imagining the sticky texture inside.” While she acknowledged that expressing this imagery with words could sound crude, she stressed that it reflects the complexity of the female experience: “In a way, it’s like welcoming a man into the space of the womb, while only the woman’s space is ‘disturbed.’ Yet, she still welcomes it and then sends [the baby] off. I think that is the essence of a woman.” Otsuka also drew inspiration from her experiences as a mother and the observation of women in society. “I have been watching a lot of daytime talk shows recently after sending my child off, and once the ‘housewife’ hour starts, it is full of content for women. Seeing that, I thought, ‘Women are so strong!’ Even if their husbands pass away, women continue to live strongly,” she reflected. She saw these resilient women as connected to the spirit of "Honey", describing them as embodying the strength and endurance she wanted to capture in the song. “Particularly the older generations of women, they really resonate with the theme of "Honey".”

== Release ==
Love Honey is Otsuka's first album in approximately two years since her previous studio effort, Love Tricky.

The album was released in four different formats: CD+Goods, CD+Blu-ray, CD+DVD, and CD only. The CD+Goods version included a fabric spray branded with the same name as the album. This original fragrance was personally produced by Otsuka and had been used to scent venues during her live performances and events since December of the previous year. Due to high demand by fans for it to be made commercially available, the fragrance was officially included as a bundled item with the album release.

The Blu-ray and DVD edition contained the music videos for "Watashi" and "Sakura Hara Hara", as well as live footage from Aio Piano Vol. 4, a special concert held at Billboard Live Tokyo on February 14, 2017.

== Promotion ==
Love Honey was preceded by the singles "Hibi, Ikiteireba" and "Watashi". "Hibi, Ikiteireba" was initially released as a digital single on July 6, 2016, and in 2017 was used as background music on the animation video A Mother’s Patience and Her Happiness (母の辛抱と、幸せと。) which was part of a campaign to prevent elderly accidents by Mazroc, a Japanese company specializing in architectural hardware. "Watashi" was used as theme song for the TV drama Kirawareru Yuki. Both b-sides included on the "Watashi" singles also had commercial endorsements: "Sakura Harahara" was used as theme song for the digital arts event Flowers by Naked 2017 – Risshun, while "Heart Break" was used as a collaboration song with Kit Kat Japan.

Otsuka embarked on her Love Honey Tour in June 2017, in which she held concerts three major cities - Tokyo, Nagoya, and Osaka.

== Track listing ==
All tracks are written by Aio.

Love Honey - CD, digital release
No.	Title	Arranger(s)	Length
1.	"Honey"	Aio; Cap	3:20
2.	"Watashi" (私)	Aio; Cap; Gen Ittetsu (strings)	3:43
3.	"QueeN"	Aio; Cap	4:08
4.	"Tokyo Sanpo" (TOKYO散歩)	Aio; Cap	4:38
5.	"Sakura Hara Hara" (サクラハラハラ)	Aio; Cap	4:29
6.	"Heart Break"	Aio; Cap	4:00
7.	"Monokuro" (モノクロ)	Aio; Masanori Sasaji	4:24
8.	"Make Up"	Aio; Cap	4:24
9.	"FrogFlag"	Aio; Masanori Sasaji	3:56
10.	"Hey! Bear"	Aio; Cap	3:56
11.	"Starter Pistol" (スターターピストル)	Aio; Cap	4:43
12.	"Hibi, Ikiteireba" (日々、生きていれば)	Aio; Masanori Sasaji	4:43
Total length:			51:02

Love Honey - DVD/Blu-ray disc
No.	Title	Length
1.	"Watashi" (Music Clip)
2.	"Sakura Hara Hara" (Music Clip)
3.	"Toaru Fūfu no Naresome" (とある夫婦のなれそめ) (from Aio Piano Vol. 4)
4.	"RounD" (from Aio Piano Vol. 4)
5.	"Ren'ai Shashin" (from Aio Piano Vol. 4)
6.	"Watashi" (from Aio Piano Vol. 4)

== Charts ==
Weekly chart performance for Love Honey
Chart (2017)	Peak position
Japanese Albums (Oricon)	23
Japanese Top Albums Sales (Billboard Japan)	20
