= Full Bloom (Kara album) =

- The digital cover. Clockwise from 1 o'clock : Gyuri, Nicole, Jiyoung, Hara and Seungyeon.

Studio album by Kara
- Released: September 2, 2013
- Recorded: 2013
- Genre: Pop; dance-pop
- Length: 29:27
- Language: Korean
- Label: DSP

Kara chronology
Fantastic Girls (2013)	Full Bloom (2013)	Best Girls (2013)

Singles from Full Bloom
- 1. "Runaway" Released: August 21, 2013; 2. "Damaged Lady" Released: September 2, 2013

Full Bloom is the fourth Korean language studio album and the eighth overall studio album release by South Korean girl group Kara. It was released on September 2, 2013, with the song "Damaged Lady" used as the lead single. The song "Runaway" was released two weeks earlier, on August 21, as a preview for it. It is also the last Korean album to feature members Nicole Jung and Kang Ji-young who departed the group in 2014, though they would rejoin the group in 2022. The album was released one week later after the group's fourth Japanese studio album, Fantastic Girls.

== Background ==
The initial hints of the group's new release in South Korea started appearing in July 2013, when an article of their contract with DSP Media was released. As stated by the label about the contract rumors, ″We're looking optimistically at renewing our contract with Kara. We're keeping various directions in mind, but we're trying to adjust everything optimistically.″ It was also stated that the group would release new material in late August.

On August 11, the label revealed, via Kara's social media accounts, the group's release was scheduled for September. On August 14, it was announced the album's showcase would be held on September 2, at UNIQLO-AX. On August 16, it was revealed the promotional track of the album would be titled "숙녀가 못 돼 ("Damaged Lady", literally, "Can't Be a Lady" in Korean). The title of the song gained attention for being their first promotional track with a Korean title since "맘에 들면 (If U Wanna)", in 2007. They also revealed that "둘 중에 하나 (Runaway) ("Runaway"; literally "One of the Two" in Korean), would be released on August 21 as a preview of the album. On August 22, the title of the album, Full Bloom was released, which makes reference back to the group's debut album, The First Blooming. A preview of the album was revealed on August 29, containing 10–to-15-second previews to all tracks, except the instrumentals.

== Composition and release ==
The album consists of seven tracks and two instrumentals. The promo single, "Runaway", is an acoustic ballad. The lead single, "Damaged Lady", is an uptempo song that features influences from pop-rock and R&B. Full Bloom reached number 1 on the Gaon Album Chart.

"Runaway" was released as a promotional single on August 21, 2013. It was written and composed by Kim Hee-young and Shim Eun-ji, known for working with artists from JYP Entertainment and SM Entertainment. It was included as the first track of the album while the instrumental version of the song was also included as the eight track. The music video for the song was released on August 21, at the same time as the digital release of the song. The music video features some scenes from the Korean TV drama Secret Love, which aired on June 13, 2014. It is two minutes long and plays a shortened version of the song. The group made their first live performance of the song on the game show Quiz on Korea on August 31, 2013. "Runaway" reached number 9 on the Gaon Weekly Singles Chart for digital releases.

The promotional track "Damaged Lady", was written by Song Soo-yun and composed by musical duo Sweetune, composed of Han Jae-ho and Kim Seung-soo. The duo has composed many singles for the group since "Rock U". Group member Nicole stated that it was about a girl who isn't mature enough to handle a break-up in a relationship and that many women can relate to the song. The song was released on September 2, 2013. The song reached number 4 on the Gaon Weekly Singles Chart, and number 9 on Billboard's Korea K-Pop Hot 100.

== Promotion ==
The group held an album showcase on September 2 at UNIQLO-AX Hall to celebrate its release, which was live streamed on Naver.

The TV promotions for the album started on September 5, 2013, on Mnet's music show M! Countdown and at the 2013 Seoul Drama Awards. The group performed "One of the Two (Runaway)" with "Damaged Lady" as part of the group's special first-week promotions.

Former members Nicole Jung and Kang Jiyoung performed "Damaged Lady" with the group for the final time at the 2013 MBC Gayo Daejejeon on December 31, 2013. The group also performed a medley of their past hit singles.

== Critical reception ==
Jeff Benjamin of Billboard K-Town gave the album a mixed review, noting that the rock-edge theme demonstrated by its promotional track "doesn't continue throughout the rest of the album" but complimented the quality of the album's tracks such as "Smoothie", which he felt was the "standout" in the album. He concluded that "there's still room for experimentation in their native South Korea". He complimented the fusion of synth and rock-pop on "Damaged Lady", stating that the group "carves a sonic lane all their own". He also wrote that the music video's concept was "an appropriate visual for a track detailing an unexpectedly break-up and the accompanying frustration."

Cha Yo-rim of The Korea Herald gave the album a negative review, writing that the group was "shedding its cutesy concept for an edgier look" but felt that despite the image change it was a "standard pop affair". She went on to criticize "Damaged Lady", writing that "the voice of each member is difficult to discern" and felt that it was "due to the copious amount of auto-tuning" used not only on the song but also on the entire album. Cha however noted that tracks like "Runaway" and "Follow Me" were the "rare gems" of the album.

== Track listing ==
No.	Title	Length
1.	"Runaway" (둘 중에 하나; "One of the Two")	3:22
2.	"Damaged Lady" (숙녀가 못 돼; "Can't Be A Lady")	3:06
3.	"1+1"	3:36
4.	"In the Game"	3:13
5.	"Follow Me"	3:10
6.	"Smoothie"	3:31
7.	"2Night"	3:06
8.	"Runaway (둘 중에 하나)" (Instrumental)	3:21
9.	"Damaged Lady (숙녀가 못 돼)" (Instrumental)	3:06
Total length:		29:27

== Chart performance ==
Chart	Peak position
South Korea Gaon weekly album chart	1
South Korea Gaon monthly album chart	4
South Korea Gaon yearly album chart	40
Japan Oricon weekly album chart	25

=== Sales and certifications ===
Chart	Amount
Gaon physical sales	46,830
Oricon physical sales	12,809

== Release history ==
Country	Date	Format	Label
South Korea	September 2, 2013	CD, Digital download	DSP Media; LOEN Entertainment
Worldwide	September 2, 2013	Digital download	DSP Media; LOEN Entertainment
Japan	October 23, 2013	CD	Universal Sigma
