= Quiz on Korea =

South Korean TV game show

Quiz on Korea 퀴즈 온 코리아
- Frequency: Annual
- Locations: Finals held in Seoul, South Korea
- Inaugurated: 2012
- Area: Worldwide
- Website: https://www.newearthblockchain.com/quiz/

Quiz on Korea is a South Korean television game show organized as part of an annual international public diplomacy program by the Ministry of Foreign Affairs of the Republic of Korea and KBS television. The quiz tests participants general knowledge of Korea. Quiz on Korea aims to help spread Hallyu, the "Korean Wave".

== Overview ==
Preliminary domestic rounds are held within selected countries and national winners receive an all-expenses-paid trip to Korea to represent their country in the final round in Korea. The representatives are taken on a week-long guided tour around Korea. The final round is filmed at KBS studios in Seoul and broadcast on KBS as a special program for the Chuseok holidays, which generally fall in September or early October. It is also aired by KBS World for some 200 million people in 88 countries around the world to watch. Since its inception the grand prize for the overall winner has been a brand new Hyundai car.

== Eligibility ==
- Foreign nationals who speak Korean and/or English.
- Individuals and his/her immediate families shall not be of Korean nationality or ethnicity.

== Format ==
Three sudden-death multi-choice rounds are held, with the winner of each round progressing to a fourth and final round.

== First Quiz on Korea ==
Twenty three countries were invited to participate to mark anniversaries of diplomatic relations.

List of participating countries
Country	Representative	Displayed name
Austria	Lilith-Isa Samer	릴리트
Azerbaijan	Gunel Nuraddinova	규넬
Bangladesh	Samia Shamim	사미아
Belarus	Alesia Nelep	알레샤
Canada	Marc Lacoste Tremblay	마크
China	Zeng Shibo	수빈
Colombia	Isabel Rincon	이사벨
Costa Rica	Katherine Arburola	케터린
Dominican Republic	Veronica Maria Hernandez Padron	베로니카
Egypt	Nancy Awad Ahmed	낸시
El Salvador	Maria Jose Carranza	마호
Guatemala	Liliana Maribel Arroyo Gramajo	릴리아나
Israel	Nir Roiter	니르
Kazakhstan	Mussabekova Gaukhar	가우하라
Morocco	Rachida Benabbou	라시다
Paraguay	Micaela Moreno	미카
Panama	Marie Diaz-Gomez	마리
Saudi Arabia	Maryam Alseini	마리암
Switzerland	Ulrich Gysel	울리
Tajikistan	Surkhova Farzona	파르조나
United States	Tamar Herman	타마르
Uzbekistan	Erdanova Hulkar	홀카르
Vietnam	Vo thi Lan da	란다

The final was held on August 31, 2012, and was broadcast on KBS1 on September 30 during Chuseok.

The MCs were:

- Shin Dong-yup, a comedian,
- Kim Hong-seong, a KBS announcer,
- Sooyoung, a K-pop star from the girl group Girls' Generation.

Entertainment between rounds was provided by:

- KARA - "Pandora"
- EXO-K - "Mama"

The overall winner of Quiz on Korea was Hulkar Erdonova, a student from Uzbekistan.

== Second Quiz on Korea ==
Thirty countries participated. The final of the second Quiz on Korea was held on August 31, 2013, and was broadcast on KBS 1 on September 19 during Chuseok.

List of participating countries
Country	Representative	Displayed name
Austria	Nicola Hoff	니콜라
Bangladesh	Md Harun Or Rashid	하룬
Belgium	Kurt Jackie Van Vlaenderen	꾸르트
Brazil	Emilly Mie Da Silva Takahashi	에밀리
Cambodia	Buntheng Chheav	분테잉
Canada	Marie Eve Dicaire	마리
Costa Rica	Minor Eduardo Quesada Grosso	마이노르
Dominican Republic	Paloma Roser Martinez Vasquez	팔로마
Egypt	Mahasen Mohamed Gad	마하센
India	Ravi Shankar Choudhary	라비
Indonesia	Ade Triana Lolitasari	룰리
Ireland	Alana Mary Obrien	앨라나
Israel	Mor Abutbul	모르
Jordan	Yasmeen Husamkhale Awwad	야스민
Morocco	Sara Essouar	사라
New Zealand	Michael Christopher Smith	마이클
China	Lili Xie	사려려
Pakistan	Hafiz Muhammad Aslam	아슬람
Paraguay	Gabriel Mercado Melgarejo	가브리엘
South Africa	Hirtenfelder Oliver	올리버
Rwanda	Honore Hirwa	호노르
Slovakia	Hana Ticha	하나
Switzerland	Imran Rashid Hafeez	임란
Tajikistan	Nazira Benazirova	나지라
Turkey	Berkay Paylar	베르카이
Uganda	Clara Kagoya	클레라
United Kingdom	Tirenioluwa Ojurereoluwa	티레니
United States	Steven Luu	스티븐
Uzbekistan	Khilolakhon Kholiddinova	힐롤라
Vietnam	Han Quynh Anh Le	아인

The MCs were:

- Lee Hwi-jae, a comedian,
- Ga Ae-ran, a KBS announcer, and
- Jae Kyung, a K-pop star from the girl group Rainbow.

Entertainment between rounds was provided by:

- Crayon Pop - "Bar Bar Bar" (빠빠빠)
- B.A.P - "Badman"
- KARA - "Runaway"

The overall winner of the second Quiz on Korea was Michael Smith from New Zealand.

== Third Quiz on Korea ==
Twenty-one countries participated. The final of the third Quiz on Korea was held on September 5, 2014, and was broadcast on KBS 1 on September 9 during Chuseok.

List of participating countries
Country	Representative	Displayed name
Mongolia	Bilguun Gantsereg	빌궁
Philippines	Dianne Young	다이앤
Kazakhstan	Akzira Abuova	악지라
Iran	Shaghayegh Vezvaei	샤거옉
New Zealand	Stuart Thomas	스튜어트
UAE	Hessa Alhemein	헤싸
India	Chhavi Sahal	샤비
China	Jianrong Liu	유건용
Guatemala	Evelyn Castellanos	에볼린
Malaysia	Zulhilmi Zamir	줄힐미
Norway	Jarne Byhre	야네
Uruguay	Tania Perez	타니아
Saudi Arabia	Hussah Alzoghaib	후싸
Colombia	Catalina Arias Vanegas	카타리나
United States	Shirley Yeh	셜리
Germany	Hiko Paschke	힐코
Portugal	Joana da Silva	주아나
Bulgaria	Radostina Peycheva	라도스티나
Singapore	Su-mei Tan	진수미
Myanmar	Theint Tun	떼잉
Poland	Monika Olszynska	모니카
