= Orphan Black – 7 Genes =

Japanese television drama

Orphan Black – 7 Genes (Japanese: (オーファン・ブラック～七つの遺伝子～ known internationally as Orphan Black Japan), launched December 2, 2017, on Fuji Television, is a Japanese remake of the BBC America show Orphan Black. It stars South Korean actress and singer Kang Ji-young as Sara Aoyama, a broke and desperate single mother who witnesses the shocking suicide of a woman who looks just like her. The remake was produced by Telepack for Tokai TV under licence from BBC Worldwide.

== Characters ==
- Kang Ji-young as Sara Aoyama/Maoko Shiina
- Ikusaburo Yamazaki as Makio Iwaki
- Shun Nishime as Kaoru Aoyama
- Saori Takizawa as Ayano Kimura
- Koki Okada as Tsuyoshi Kinjou
- Tsutomu Takahashi as Nagase
- Naoto Takenaka as Wakita
- Yumi Asou as Saeko Aoyama
- Rin Shouno as Moe Aoyama
