= Hibi, Ikiteireba =

Single by Ai Otsuka

from the album Love Honey
- Language: Japanese
- Released: July 6, 2016
- Genre: J-pop, jazz
- Length: 4:40
- Label: Avex Trax
- Songwriter: Aio

Ai Otsuka singles chronology
"More More" (2014)	"Hibi, Ikiteireba" (2016)	"Watashi" (2017)

Music video
- "Hibi, Ikiteireba" on YouTube

"Hibi, Ikiteireba" (日々、生きていれば, lit. 'If We Live Each Day') is a song by Japanese singer-songwriter Ai Otsuka. The song was released as a digital single on July 6, 2016, through Avex Trax.

== Background and release ==
"Hibi, Ikiteireba" was performed live for the first time as a piano-accompanied solo during the encore of Otsuka’s anniversary concert Love Is Born: 12th Anniversary 2015 held on September 13, 2015, at Hibiya Open-Air Concert Hall. It became her first song publicly revealed since Love Tricky, Otsuka's seventh studio album released approximately four and a half months prior. Before beginning the song, the artist addressed the audience, sharing the personal and societal context that inspired its creation. She introduced the song by saying, “There have been so many heartbreaking events lately. Each time... I often find myself at a loss for words. Even we, in our daily lives -while struggling, trying our best, slacking off, getting into arguments- we choose to keep on living, and we get through each day somehow. If we live each day, there will of course be sad things, but there will also definitely be happy things. I wrote this song with that in mind. The title is 'Hibi, Ikiteireba'. It is a bit more serious than what I usually go for, but it really reflects what I’ve been feeling lately. If we just keep living, I truly believe something good will come.”

Following the completion of the song’s mix, on April 21, 2016, Otsuka released a full-length video performance of the song on Facebook. Subsequently, the song was released as a digital-only single to commemorate Otsuka’s special concert Aio Piano: Hoshi no Ongakukai held on Tanabata on July 7 and 8 in Achi Village, Nagano Prefecture—a location known for having Japan’s clearest starry skies. It was later included in Otsuka's 8th studio album, Love Honey, released on April 12, 2017.

== Composition and themes ==
"Hibi, Ikiteireba" was written and composed by Otsuka, while its arrangements were in charge of Masanori Sasaji, who created a jazz-influenced band arrangement layered with horns. The song’s lyrics underline the theme of enduring life's complexities and embracing both its beauty and sorrows.

== Promotion ==
Coinciding with the release, a special website for "Hibi, Ikiteireba" was launched, which promoted a social media campaign where users could share personal experiences using the hashtag #HibiIki on Twitter. These posts were added on the site.

In 2017, "Hibi, Ikiteireba" was featured as the theme song for a new flipbook animation entitled Haha no Shinbō to, Shiawase to. (母の辛抱と、幸せと。, lit. 'A Mother's Patience and Her Happiness'), created by Japanese comedian and illustrator Tekken (Takefumi Kurashina). The animation was commissioned by Matsuroku Co., Ltd., a hardware company promoting fall prevention among the elderly.

== Personnel ==
Credits adapted from the liner notes of the Love Honey album.

- Aio (Ai Otsuka) – vocals, songwriting, arrangements
- Masanori Sasaji – piano, arrangements
- Masakuni Takeno – bass clarinet
- Vagabond Suzuki – wood bass
- Gondo Kazuhiko – clarinet
- Osamu Yoshida – clarinet
- Ryoji Ihara – clarinet
- Eijiro Nakagawa – trombone
- Koji Nishimura – trumpet
- Luis Valle – trumpet
- Takaoki Saito – recording, mixing
