= Bye Bye Happy Days! =

- Regular edition cover

Single by Kara

from the album Fantastic Girls
- B-side: "My Boy"; "Beautiful Night"
- Released: March 27, 2013
- Genre: Pop, dance-pop
- Length: 4:36
- Label: Universal Sigma
- Songwriters: Simon Isogai, Kim Won-hyun
- Producers: Simon Isogai, Kim Won-hyun

Kara Japanese singles chronology
"Electric Boy" (2012)	"Bye Bye Happy Days!" (2013)	"Thank You Summer Love" (2013)

"Bye Bye Happy Days!" (バイバイ ハッピーデイズ!, Baibai Happīdeizu!) is the eighth Japanese single by South Korean girl group Kara. It was released on March 27, 2013.

== Editions ==
The single was released in four different editions. All limited editions come with a trading card randomly selected from five kinds.

- CD+DVD Type A: This edition includes the standard track list and a DVD including the music video of the song, a dance version and the making of.
- CD+DVD Type B: This edition includes the standard track list and a DVD featuring the music video of the song "Orion", which was released as the B-side of their previous single "Electric Boy" and later included in their third Japanese album Girls Forever (2012), a close-up version and its making of.
- First Press Limited CD Only: This edition includes a bonus track, "Beautiful Night", which was used as the opening theme song for the group's anime KARA the Animation.
- Regular CD Only: This edition contains the standard track list only.

== Composition ==
The song was written and composed by Simon Isogai, who also composed "Winter Magic", "Ima, Okuritai 'Arigatō'" and "Orion", released by the group, with arrangements by ArmySlick.

The B-side "My Boy" is a Japanese version of the song "Date (My Boy)", released on the group's third Korean album Step. It was written and composed by Kim Won-hyun, and translated in Japanese by Kaori Moriwaka.

"Beautiful Night" is a bonus track of the first press regular edition. It is a Korean song written and composed by Kim Won-hyun. It was used as opening theme song for their anime KARA the Animation.

== Music video ==
A teaser for the music video of "Bye Bye Happy Days!" was released on March 13, 2013 through Kara's official Japanese YouTube page. The full music video was released two days later on the TV channel Space Shower TV Plus.

== Track listing ==
Limited editions and CD only regular edition:
No.	Title	Lyrics	Music	Length
1.	"Bye Bye Happy Days!" (バイバイ ハッピーデイズ!; Baibai Happīdeizu!)	Simon Isogai	Simon Isogai	4:36
2.	"My Boy" (マイボーイ; Mai Bōi)	Kim Won-hyun, Kaori Moriwaka	Kim Won-hyun	3:24
3.	"Bye Bye Happy Days!" (Instrumental)			4:36
4.	"My Boy" (Instrumental)			3:25
Total length:				16:01

Bonus Track (Limited Edition Version C):
No.	Title	Lyrics	Music	Length
5.	"Beautiful Night"	Kim Won-hyun	Kim Won-hyun	3:26
Total length:				19:27

DVD (Limited Edition Type A):
No.	Title	Length
1.	"Bye Bye Happy Days!" (Music video)
2.	"Bye Bye Happy Days!" (Music video - Dance Version)
3.	"Bye Bye Happy Days!" (Music video - Making of)

DVD (Limited Edition Type B):
No.	Title	Length
1.	"Orion" (Music video)
2.	"Orion" (Music video - Close-up Version)
3.	"Orion" (Music video - Making of)

== Chart performance ==
The physical single debuted at the position number three on Oricon's daily chart, selling 25,552 copies in its first day. On the next day, the single climbed to the position number two, selling 12,880 copies. On the third day, the single remained to the position number two, selling 9,265 copies. On the fourth and fifth days the single sold 7,729 and 6,217 copies respectively. With the total of 61,643 copies sold within the first 5 days, the single surpassed the first week sales of "Electric Boy", which sold 57,942 copies in its first week.

=== Oricon chart ===
Oricon Chart	Peak	Debut sales	Sales total
Daily Singles Chart	2	25,552	78,325+
Weekly Singles Chart	2	65,588	78,325+
Monthly Singles Chart	10	72,451	78,325+
Yearly Singles Chart	90	78,325	78,325+

=== Billboard charts ===
Chart	Peak position
Billboard Japan Hot 100	2
Billboard Japan Hot Singles Sales	2
Billboard Japan Hot Top Airplay	7
Billboard Japan Adult Contemporary Airplay	23
