= Simon Isogai =

- Also known as: Isogai Saimon 磯貝 サイモン
- Born: September 20, 1983 (age 42); Kanagawa Prefecture, Japan
- Genres: Rock, Folk
- Occupations: Musician, singer, songwriter
- Years active: 2002–present
- Labels: Victor Entertainment (2006–2011); Hit-o-ride Records (2011–present)
- Website: isogaisimon.net/index.html

Simon Isogai (磯貝 サイモン, Isogai Saimon; born September 20, 1983) is a Japanese singer and musician from Kanagawa Prefecture, Japan. Formerly signed with Victor Entertainment, he has his own independent label, Hit-o-ride Records.

== Biography ==
Isogai's father chose the name "Simon" because he was a fan of Simon & Garfunkel. During junior high school, he often listened to hard rock on Masanori Itō's Rock City (伊藤政則のROCK CITY Itō Masanori no Rock City) and other television programs.

Isogai started performing live shows around his hometown in 2002, and he released an independently created mini-album the following year. He did not have his major debut until November 22, 2006. On his first album, White Room, he self-produced nine of the eleven songs.

He also wrote the music and lyrics to the song "Himitsu" for Arashi's Kazunari Ninomiya.

== Discography ==
=== Singles ===
1. Kimi wa Yukeru (君はゆける You Can Go) (November 22, 2006)
2. Hatsukoi ni Sasagu Uta (初恋に捧ぐ歌 A Song Dedicated to my First Love) (September 26, 2007)
3. Kaerimichi nite (帰り道にて On the Road Home) (January 16, 2008)

=== Albums ===
1. White Room (ホワイトルーム Howaito Rūmu) (February 20, 2008)

== Associated acts ==
- Mai Fukui (Asahi ha Good Day, Tatta Hitori no Mikata)
- Kara (Bye Bye Happy Days!, Winter Magic, Ima, Okuritai 'Arigatō, Orion)
- Kylee (Crazy for You)
- Naoto Inti Raymi (Boku ha Kimi ga, Naitetatte)
- Kazunari Ninomiya (Himitsu)
- Dream (Darling)
