= Wanna (song) =

2009 single by Kara

Single by Kara

from the album Revolution
- Released: July 28, 2009
- Genre: Dance-pop
- Length: 3:05
- Label: DSP Entertainment, M.Net Media
- Songwriter(s): Han Jae-ho, Kim Seung-soo
- Producer(s): Han Jae-ho, Kim Seung-soo

Kara singles chronology
"Honey" (2009)	"Wanna" (2009)	"Mister" (2009)

"Wanna" is a song by South Korean girl group Kara from their second studio album, Revolution (2009). It was released as the album's lead single on July 28, 2009. Various news agencies predicted that it would become their third hit, after "Pretty Girl" and "Honey". Upon release, "Wanna" immediately charted on various digital music charts and went on to become the group's third number-one hit. A month after its release, the song won the "Mutizen Song" award from SBS's Inkigayo music program.

== Composition ==
"Wanna" is a dance-pop song, with strong beats and a fast pace. It was written and composed by Han Jae-ho and Kim Seung-su, the team behind their previous hits "Pretty Girl" and "Honey".

== Promotion ==
The group started their first round of promotions the weekend of July 31 to August 2, 2009, starting with KBS's Music Bank. In an interview after their first performance, the group stated that although it was difficult to present a strong image for the first time, it was exciting for the members overall.

== Music video ==
It was announced that actor Ryu Sang-wuk would be featured in the music video, which was filmed from July 20–21, 2009. The actor plays a man whom the group members stalk. The music video was released on July 29, 2009.

The video begins with Kara in a pink room watching anxiously as Jiyoung makes a phone call to the handsome neighbor next door. Right before she confesses her feelings, he accidentally hangs up on her, leaving her to think he has rejected her. They watch him through a telescope and the guy exits, passing by his pet parrot who utters the word "Kara".

The song starts as the girls break into the guy's house and trashes it, showing cuts of the Kara members dancing in 2 different rooms. Jiyoung finds pictures of herself in the guy's drawer, happily realizing that her feelings are returned. Kara leaves the house just as the guy comes back. Stunned at the mess, he trips and falls over, breaking his ankle. The video ends with Kara visiting him at his house, and Jiyoung draws a love heart on his cast.

== Commercial performance ==
The song performed well on South Korea's digital music charts and received the "Mutizen Song" award from SBS's Inkigayo, which their previous song "Honey" also won. "Wanna" is estimated to have sold at least 2,000,000 downloads in South Korea.
