= Kit Kats in Japan =

Japanese confection variants

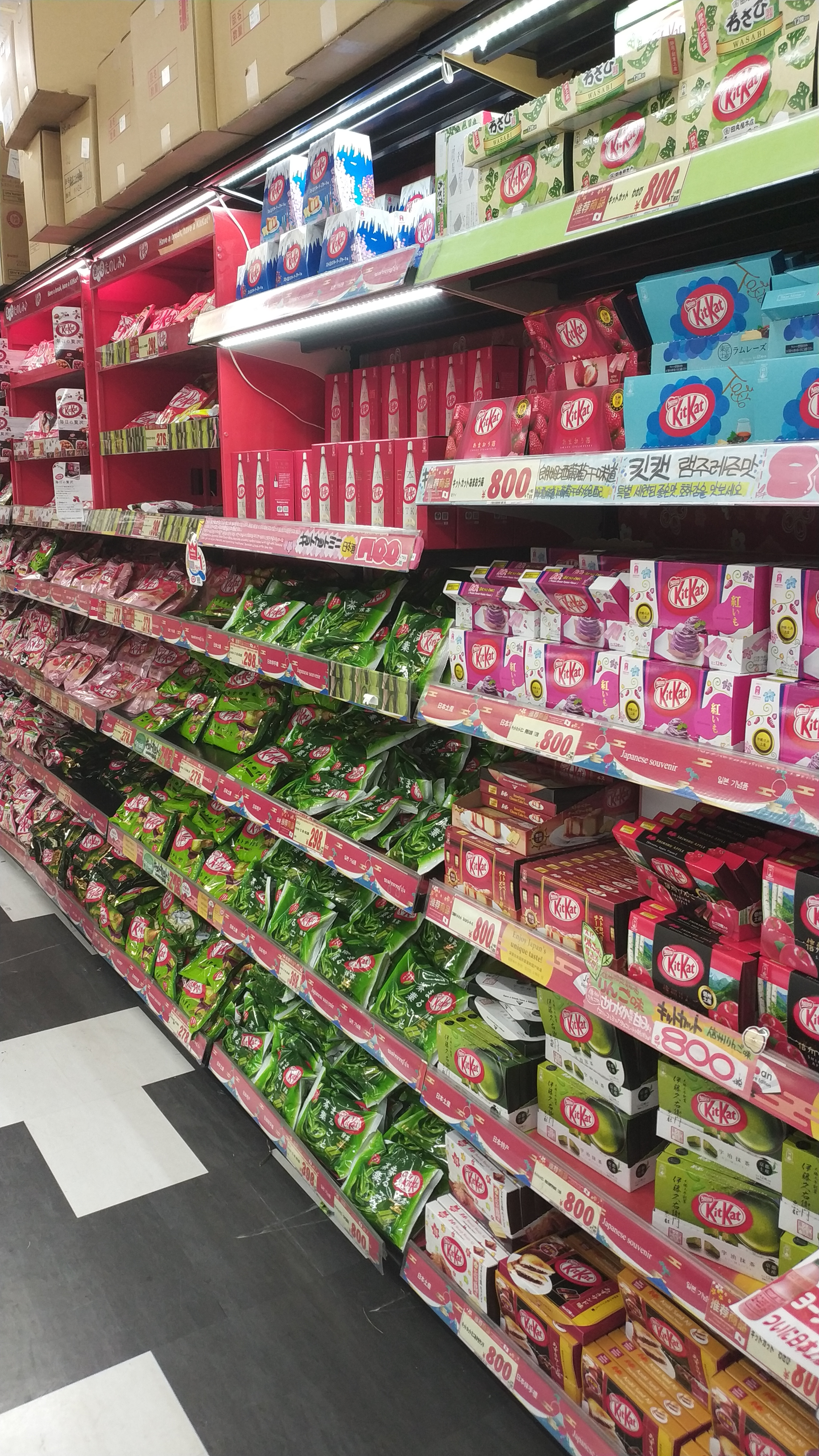
A variety of exclusive Japanese Kit Kat flavors on display in a store in Osaka, Japan.

There have been more than 400 limited-edition seasonal and regional flavors of Kit Kat chocolate bars produced in Japan since 2000, many exclusive to the country. Nestlé, which operates the Kit Kat brand in Japan, reports that the brand overtook Meiji Chocolate as the top-selling confectionery in Japan from 2012 to 2014. The company's marketing campaign, which partnered with Japan Post to sell the bar in 20,000 post offices, won an award in 2010. The campaign encouraged associations of the product's name with the coincidental cognate Kitto Katsu (きっと勝つ), translated as "You will surely win", and could be mailed as a good luck charm for students ahead of university exams.

== History ==
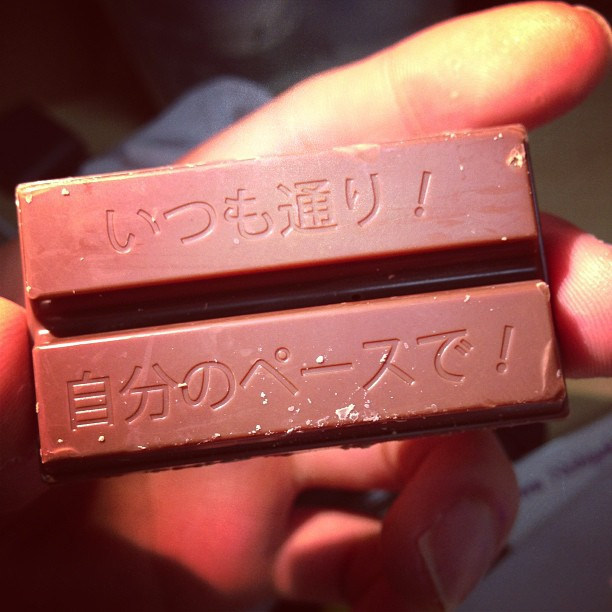
A Japanese edition Kit Kat. The messages translate to "As usual!" (top) and "At your own pace!" (bottom)

Kit Kats were introduced to Japan in 1973 when British confectioner Rowntree's made an agreement with Japanese confectioner and restaurant owner Fujiya. In 2014, they were the top-selling confection in the country. The Kit Kat brand took the number one sales position from Meiji chocolate in 2012, though Meiji remains the leading confection company in Japan overall.

In 2004, the green tea flavor was introduced. Since then, the product has been sold in more than 300 seasonal and regional flavors. The top-selling flavor of the candy bar in 2010 was soy sauce. Nestlé attributes the success of the flavor varieties to the tradition of omiyage, in which regional specialties are brought back for family and co-workers from trips away. The company believes the limited-edition seasonal models create a "scarcity and rarity of value" for customers.

The business model was created to solve a problem the company found in Japanese convenience stores, which frequently rotated items and flavors off of shelves. By producing smaller runs of flavors, the company was better able to control its production costs. It was also economically viable in Japan because there is no initial product fee for listing new products in Japanese convenience stores.

Kit Kats in Japan are produced at Nestlé-owned factories in Himeji and Kasumigaura. The milk chocolate used for Kit Kats is made from whole-milk powder; Nestlé buys most of its cacao beans from West Africa.

== Marketing ==
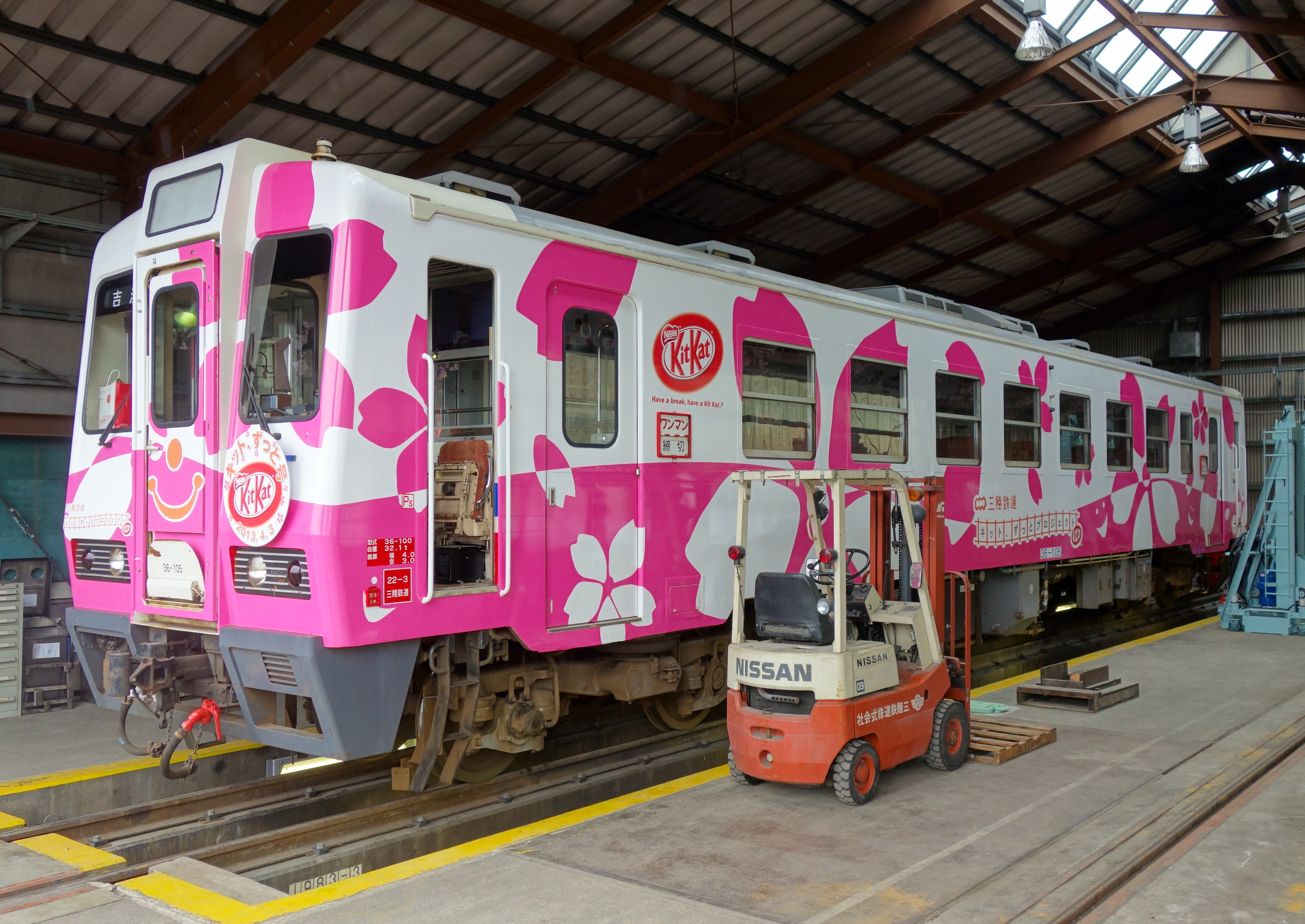
A train car with Kit Kat logos in Japan

Marketing for Kit Kats in Japan is believed to have benefited from the coincidental false cognate with "Kitto Katsu", a phrase meaning "You will surely win" in Japanese. Some market research has shown that the brand is strongly correlated to good luck charms, particularly among students ahead of exams. Kit Kat's "Lucky Charm" advertising campaign in Japan won the Asian Brand Marketing Effectiveness Award in 2005.

Nestlé and the Japan Post launched a campaign in 2009, allowing people to write messages and mail the chocolate bars from 20,000 post offices. The special packages included a space to write a message of encouragement and affix a stamp. The promotional packages were sold out within a month. The campaign won the Media Grand Prix in 2010's Cannes Lions International Advertising Festival.

== Varieties ==
The Kit Kat Chocolatory based in Japan, with recipes designed by chef Yasumasa Takagi, opened in 2014, and had expanded to seven branches by 2015. The company claims it has served more than 1 million customers and earned more than 2 billion yen. These shops sell high-end Kit Kat products such as raspberry-infused dark chocolate, orange-chocolate rum, cherry blossom and green tea. A variety of Takagi's flavors have been introduced as seasonal products, including flavors such as plum, passion fruit, chilli, ginger and kinako soybean powder. In 2016, Nestlé introduced a sake Kit Kat, which combines sake powder with white chocolate.

Some varieties are restricted to a specific region associated with that particular bar. Others are limited-run varieties, with excess supply saved for year-end "happy bag" specials. In 2015, 500 single-finger bitter chocolate bars were sold with gold leaf wrapping for about $16 in high-end retail shops.

Notable varieties include adzuki (red bean), beni imo (purple sweet potato), kuromitsu (brown sugar syrup), matcha (green tea), and soy sauce.

The cafe shop Pronto has introduced croissants incorporating Kit Kats. Pizza chains Napoli no Kama and Strawberry Cones introduced dessert pizzas with bakeable Kit Kat toppings in March 2014.

In October 2018, Nestle opened a Kit Kat store at Namba Station in Osaka.

=== Additional varieties ===
- Apple
- Amazake
- Bakeable custard
- Baked potato
- Banana
- Black tea
- Blueberry cheesecake
- Brown sugar syrup
- Butter
- Café au lait
- Cantaloupe
- Cappuccino
- Caramel macchiato McFlurry
- Cherry
- Cherry blossom green tea latte
- Cherry blossom mochi
- Chestnut
- Chocobanana
- Cinnamon cookie
- Citrus golden blend
- Corn
- Cough Drop
- Crème brûlée
- Double cookie
- Edamame
- European cheese
- Exotic Tokyo
- Fruit parfait
- Ginger ale
- Golden citrus
- Green bean
- Hōjicha
- Hokkaido cheese and chocolate
- Hokkaido melon with mascarpone cheese
- Hokkaido roasted corn
- Hot Japanese chili
- Kinako
- Kobe pudding
- Kuchidoke kakao
- Lemon cheesecake
- Maple
- Melon and cheese
- Miso soup
- Muscat of Alexandria
- Okinawa sweet potato
- Oreo ice cream
- Pear
- Pineapple
- Pumpkin
- Ramune soda
- Raspberry passionfruit
- Red potato
- Rilakkuma hotcake
- Rock salt
- Royal milk tea
- Ruby chocolate
- Sake
- Sakura and Soybean Powder
- Salt and caramel
- Shikuwasa
- Shinshu apple
- Soy flour
- Soy sauce
- Strawberry
- Strawberry cheesecake
- Sugar Butter Tree
- Sweet pudding
- Tokyo Banana
- Triple berry swirl
- Vegetable juice
- Wasabi
- Watermelon
- Yokohama cheesecake
- Yūbari melon
- Yuzu

== See also ==
- Chocolate in Japan
- Meibutsu
- Omiyage
