= Mister (song) =

- Japanese single cover

Single by Kara

from the album Revolution and Girl's Talk
- B-side: "Umbrella" (JP ver.)
- Released: August 15, 2009 (KR); August 11, 2010 (JP)
- Genre: Dance-pop
- Length: 3:12
- Label: DSP; Universal Sigma
- Songwriters: Song Soo-yoon; Natsumi Watanabe; PA-NON
- Producers: Han Jae-ho; Kim Seung-soo

Kara Korean singles chronology
"Wanna" (2009)	"Mister" (2009)	"Lupin" (2010)

Kara Japanese singles chronology
"Mister" (2010)	"Jumping" (2010)

Music video
- "Mister" on YouTube

"Mister" (Hangul: 미스터, Japanese: ミスター) is a song performed by South Korean girl group Kara from their second Korean album, Revolution (2009) and their debut Japanese album, Girl's Talk (2010). It was released as their Japanese debut single on August 11, 2010. It was released in four editions, one includes a DVD, another one is CD with a 28-page photobook, and two CD only editions, first press and regular.

== Background and composition ==
The song was originally from the group's second Korean album Revolution. The group performed this song as a part of their comeback stage special alongside Revolution's lead single, "Wanna", starting on July 31, 2009, beginning with KBS's Music Bank then onto MBC's Show! Music Core and finally on SBS's Inkigayo. After wrapping up their comeback stages to begin promotions for their second full-length Korean album, the song proved to be popular with the viewers due to its "butt dance" that is featured prominently in the choreography; helping the group's Revolution album to perform well on various music charts prompting the group to promote the song more on music programs rather than the actual lead single, "Wanna". Due to the overwhelming response that "Mister" received, the group's overall popularity in South Korea increased, with numerous advertisement requests coming in for the group as they had more advertisements in October 2009 than the previous two years.

=== Japanese version ===
On May 8, 2010, it was announced at a press conference in Akasaka that the group would be making their long-awaited Japanese debut with a Japanese version of the song during summer. On July 15, 2010, Universal Music Japan released the promotional video teaser of "Mister" stating that their single will be released on August 11, 2010. Upon release, their Japanese debut single ranked #5 in the Oricon daily chart.

The group held a surprise performance at Shibuya109 in Tokyo on the same day. Although the event was not officially announced, 3,000 fans who heard the news immediately gathered to watch the group perform. As there was a greater number of people who arrived than expected, their Japanese label, Universal Sigma, had to suspend the concert in 3 minutes when it was supposed to last 30, because the location of the concert was a famous traffic area in Tokyo, and the massive gathering of the crowd could be dangerous for the people's safety. Multiple Japanese news media, including Sankei Sports, has reported this unbelievable event, and confirmed the group's successful debut in Japan.

== Composition ==
The song is about a girl who has a crush on someone, but is too shy to approach him. Because she doesn't know the person very well, she refers him as "Mr." The song is in 4/4 time with the tempo of 126 beats per minute. The key starts at E minor, and transposes up a semitone to F minor on the fourth time the chorus is sung. The track samples the opening chant of Disco Four's "Do It, Do It", but in the official lyrics, it is mistranscribed as "boom it" instead of "do it". The B-side, "Umbrella", is originally from the group's third mini-album, Lupin. The musical arrangement and the lyrics has also been slightly altered. Like for example, the beginning of the song is much more different than the Korean version. However, during the bridge of the song the members can be heard rapping/talking in Korean language.

== Reception ==
Upon release, the group's debut single exceeded expectations as it ranked #5 in the Oricon daily chart. "Mister" was ranked #1 on Japan iTunes as most downloaded video and song. On August 17, 2010, it was announced by Oricon Style that Kara's single debut album "Mister" ranked #5 in the weekly singles making them the first ever Korean girl group to do so. Oricon Style reported the girls’ success as, “First time in 29 years and 8 months since a foreign girl group has entered the top 10 with their debut album.” The song was certified Platinum by the RIAJ for cellphone digital downloads.

== Music video and promotion ==
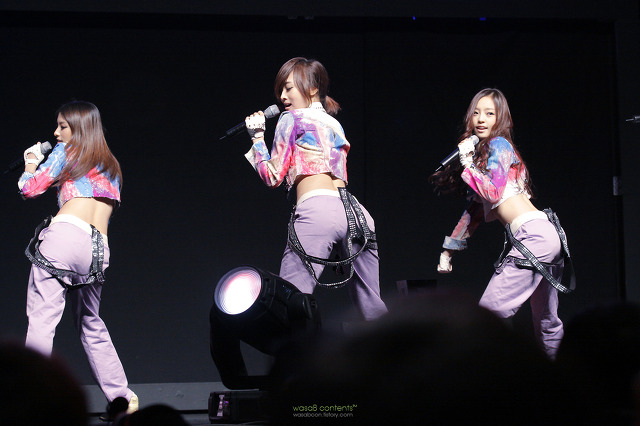
Kara performing the "butt dance" in 2009

On June 19, 2010, it was confirmed by an official from the music video set that they were in the process of filming a promotional video for the song. The full video premiered on July 27, 2010. The girls can be seen in various sets, including a basketball court scene and in the military base, sporting their usual sexy outfits to match with those seen on the single's album covers. They are also seen wearing military outfits during the military base scene. It was the group's first ever and only music video of the song. The video has since been uploaded on DSP Media's YouTube channel on March 7, 2011.

The group performed a short version of the song as a part of their comeback stage special alongside Revolution's lead single, "Wanna", starting on July 31, 2009, beginning with KBS's Music Bank then onto MBC's Show! Music Core and finally on SBS's Inkigayo. The group eventually filmed a live performance of the whole song on August 19, 2009, at MBC's Show! Music Core. Afterwards, the group began promoting the song more on other music programs due to the song's sudden rise of popularity for its popular "butt dance" choreography. The group made their Japanese debut with the single and had their first live performance on TV Asahi's program "Music Station" for the first time on October 15, 2010, showing off the popular "butt dance" to the Japanese audience. In 2011, the group also performed the song as a part of a medley with "Jet Coaster Love" during the 62nd Kōhaku Uta Gassen. They opened the second half of the show wearing red attires.

== In popular culture ==
The song's popular "butt-dance" has been featured on various TV programs and other media outlets in Japan. A parody of it was featured on the popular anime series Naruto Spin-off: Rock Lee and his Ninja Pals - Episode 6 and Doraemon, and on the live action series Kamen Rider Fourze - Episode 3. The song is featured in the international music game, DJ Max Technika 3; both on arcade and PlayStation Vita releases. The song was also included on the Japanese release of the Nintendo Wii video game Just Dance and on the K-pop Dance Festival which is the Korean version of the Just Dance made by Skonec. Many well-known celebrities and actors in Japan have also shown their fondness for the song's dance. Jun Matsumoto, member of popular Japanese boyband Arashi, also attempted to dance to the song during the April 16 episode of his group's variety show Arashi Ni Shiyagare. Child actress Mana Ashida also considers herself a fan of the group and had performed the dance during her March 28 appearance on Shabekuri 007. She was later given a surprise visit by the Kara members during her 7th birthday.

== Impact ==
In 2011, Usen revealed that Mister ranked #18 for the year, based on hit song rankings, song requests, and broadcasts. Japan's karaoke charts also ranked Mister #1 for the months of November and December, revealing Kara's popularity potential in Japan in the coming year. Figure dolls based upon the group wearing the attire they wore during promotions for the single were eventually released in March 2012 in South Korea and Japan. This also made them the first South Korean idol girl group to launch their own toy-brand based on themselves.

On October 31, 2013, "Mister" was revealed to have made the most profit from royalties and copyright revenue in 2012 by the Ministry of Culture, despite being released in 2009. The profits came from digital download sales and royalties from establishments such as karaoke joints. The song was revealed to have made approximately ₩362 million (US$341,000). It was followed by fellow girl group Girls' Generation's "Gee", also released in 2009, which earned approximately ₩359 million (US$338,000). Melon and Rolling Stone ranked "Mister" the 17th and 29th greatest K-pop songs of all time, respectively.

== Track listings ==
Maxi single
No.	Title	Lyrics	Music	Length
1.	"Mister (ミスター)"	Song Soo Yoon, Natsumi Watanabe, PA-NON	Han Jae-Ho, Kim Seung Soo	3:12
2.	"Umbrella (アンブレラ)"	Song Soo Yoon, Natsumi Watanabe	Han Jae-Ho, Kim Seung Soo	3:45
3.	"Mister" (Instrumental)			3:12
4.	"Mister (미스터)" (Bonus Track (Version C)	Song Soo Yoon	Han Jae-Ho, Kim Seung Soo	3:12
Total length:				13:21

DVD (Version A)
No.	Title	Length
1.	"Mister" (Music video)
2.	"Mister" (Music Video - Dance version)
3.	"Mister" (Music Video - Behind the Scenes)

== Charts ==
=== Weekly charts ===
Chart (2010)	Peak position
Japan (Japan Hot 100)	9
Japan (Oricon)	5
Japan (RIAJ Digital Track Chart)	2

=== Year-end charts ===
Chart (2010)	Rank
Japan (Oricon)	67
Japan Adult Contemporary (Billboard)	68

Chart (2011)	Rank
Japan (RIAJ Digital Track Chart)	6

== Sales and certifications ==
Region	Certification	Certified units/sales
Japan (RIAJ) Physical single	Gold	144,856
Japan (RIAJ) Digital single	Million	1,000,000^{*}
Japan (RIAJ) Ringtone	3× Platinum	750,000^{*}
Japan (RIAJ) Full-length ringtone	3× Platinum	750,000^{*}
^{*} Sales figures based on certification alone.

== Release history ==
Country	Date	Format	Label
Japan	August 11, 2010	CD single; digital download	Universal Sigma
Taiwan	August 20, 2010	CD + DVD	Universal Sigma
Indonesia	August 12, 2022	CD + DVD	Universal Sigma
Philippines	November 9, 2022	CD + DVD	Universal Sigma
