= Kang Ji-young =

South Korean singer and actress (born 1994)

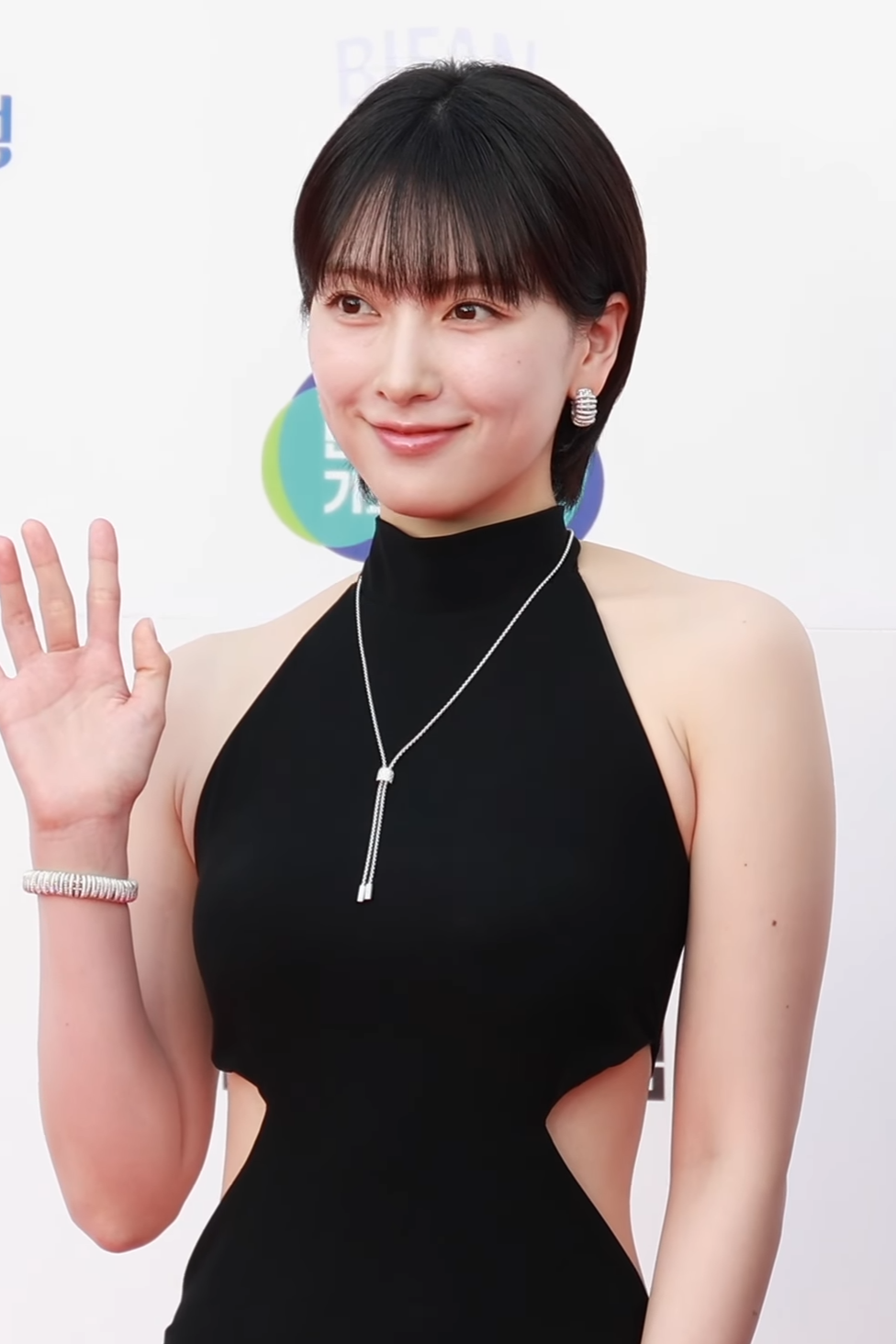
- Kang in July 2025
- Born: January 18, 1994 (age 32); Paju, South Korea
- Other name: JY
- Education: Sungkyunkwan University
- Occupations: Singer; songwriter; actress
- Years active: 2008–present
- Agents: SMG; Sweet Power
- Relatives: Kim Yoon-ji (cousin)
- Musical career
- Genres: K-pop; J-pop
- Instruments: Vocals; guitar
- Labels: DSP; Sony
- Member of: Kara

Korean name
- Hangul: 강지영
- Hanja: 姜知英
- RR: Gang Jiyeong
- MR: Kang Chiyŏng

Kang Ji-young (Korean: 강지영; born January 18, 1994), also known mononymously as Jiyoung (Note: Kang's Japanese-language acting roles are credited mononymously in kanji (知英).) or under the stage name JY, is a South Korean singer, songwriter and actress. At age 14, she rose to fame as a member of the South Korean girl group Kara, joining the group in 2008. Dubbed as "Hallyu Queens", Kara achieved mainstream success across Asia, particularly in Japan where they earned ten top-five singles on the Oricon Singles Chart, and became the first female South Korean act to perform at the Tokyo Dome. Kang left Kara in April 2014, but rejoined for the group's 15th anniversary commemorative album Move Again (2022), and subsequent concert tours (2024–2025).

After leaving Kara, Kang moved to Japan and shifted focus onto her acting career. She achieved recognition for her portrayal of characters in many live-action adaptations of popular manga series, including Yukime in the Nippon TV series Hell Teacher: Jigoku Sensei Nube (2014), Irina Jelavić in the Assassination Classroom films (2015–2016), and Itori in the film Tokyo Ghoul S (2019). She is also known for her lead role in the science-fiction thriller series Orphan Black – 7 Genes (2017–2018). Aside from her Japanese-speaking roles, Kang has appeared in Korean dramas with a lead role in the JTBC series Sweet Munchies (2020), and has since appeared in a number of independent films.

Kang signed with Sony Music Japan as a solo artist in 2015. She released her debut studio album, Many Faces (2017), which spawned two top-ten singles in Japan, "Saigo no Sayonara" and "Suki na Hito ga Iru Koto". The latter was double certified by the Recording Industry Association of Japan (RIAJ). Aside from music and acting, Kang's modeling work has included being an exclusive model for the women's fashion magazine Non-no between 2014 and 2016, and being a global brand ambassador for the confectionery brand Kit Kat.

== Early life and education ==
Kang Ji-young was born on January 18, 1994, in Paju, South Korea. She grew up in a Buddhist household, with two older sisters. At the age of 14, Kang auditioned for DSP Media and was accepted as a trainee in June 2008. She was encouraged to audition by her cousin, actress Kim Yoon-ji, who was also a trainee at the same company at the time. In addition to her native Korean, Kang speaks fluent Japanese, and she has some knowledge of English and Mandarin Chinese.

Kang attended Bongilcheon Middle School in Paju. After moving into a dormitory in Seoul with her fellow Kara members, she transferred to Kwanghee Middle School, and then attended Muhak Girls' High School, graduating in 2012. Following high school, in February 2013 she enrolled at Sungkyunkwan University, majoring in performing arts.

== Career ==
=== 2008–2014: Kara ===
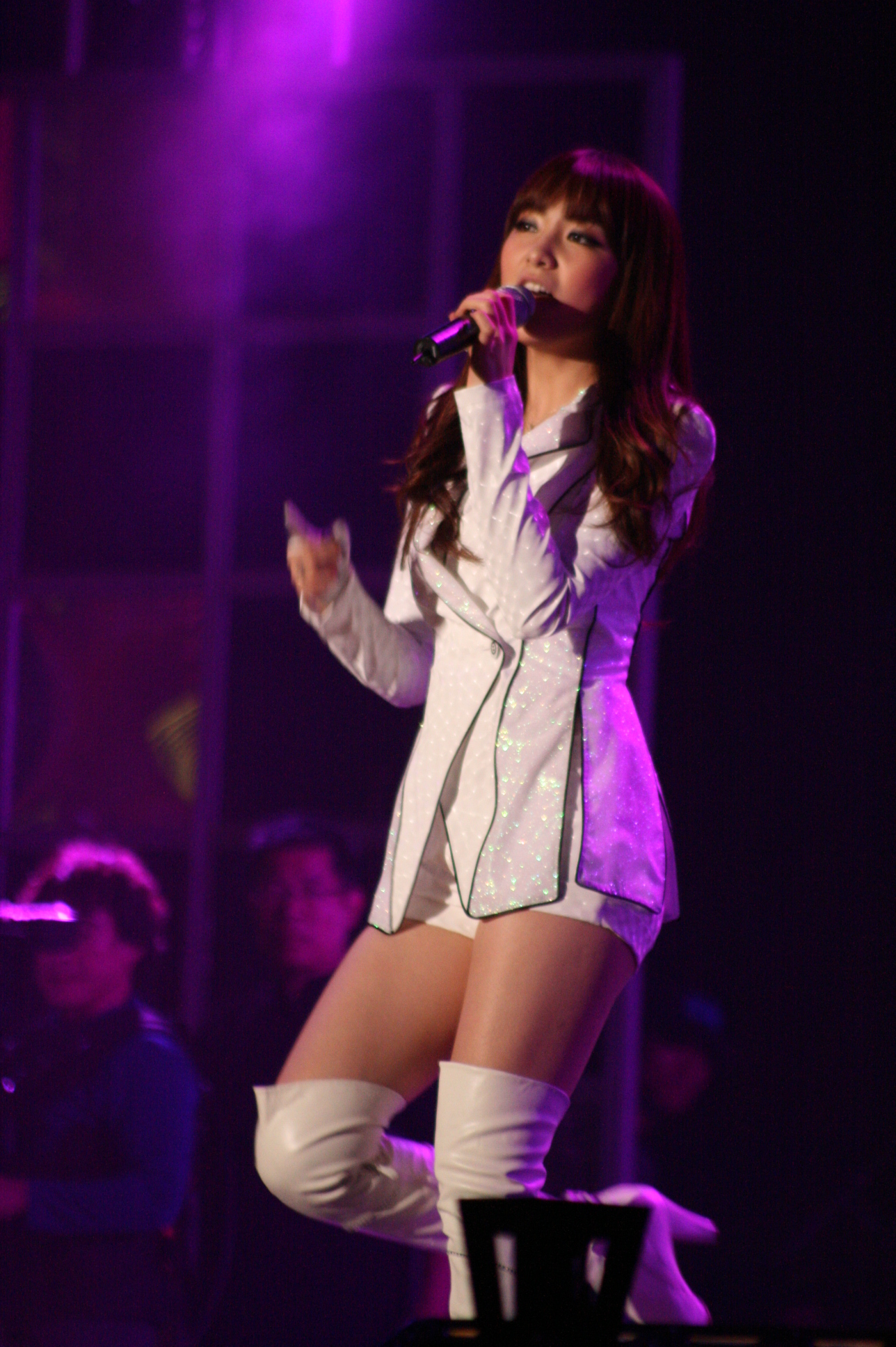
Kang performing at the 2010 Asia Song Festival

After a month of training, Kang joined the girl group Kara in 2008, following the departure of former member Kim Sung-hee. She made her broadcast debut alongside fellow newcomer to the group Goo Hara on July 24, 2008, performing on the music program M Countdown on Mnet. Their mini-album Rock U was released the next day, marking the group's first release as a quintet. Kara gained significant popularity following the release of their hit single "Mister" in 2009. The song was a critical and commercial success domestically, and successfully launched the group's career in Japan. Earning the moniker "Hallyu Queens", the group was included in the Forbes Korea Power Celebrity 40 list as one of the most influential celebrities in South Korea, ranking 4th in 2012, and 13th in 2013. The group became the first female South Korean act to perform at the Tokyo Dome.

In April 2009, Kang was featured on the hip-hop duo Jumper's single "Dazzling" (눈이부셔). In September, she became a fixed guest DJ on the KBS Cool FM radio show Kiss the Radio alongside member Park Gyu-ri. She also joined the MBC Standard FM radio show Stop the Boring Time that same year, hosting the "Tasting Corner" segment. In July 2010, Kang began presenting the MBC Every1 variety show I Love Pets alongside member Han Seung-yeon. That same month, Kang made a guest appearance on the SBS variety program Haha Mong Show, and was later promoted to a series regular in September. However, following allegations that fellow host MC Mong had attempted to evade his mandatory military service, the show was canceled after episode 11, with the rest of the recorded episodes remaining unaired.

In December 2010, Kang was featured on the soundtrack for the drama Big Thing alongside Park Gyu-ri, with the track "My Love". That same month, she released a digital single titled "Merry Love", in collaboration with Supernova's Kim Sung-je. The song was later re-recorded in Japanese and released in Japan on March 23, 2011. In January 2011, Kang announced that she would be terminating her contract with DSP Media alongside members Han Seung-yeon and Nicole Jung, citing that the company forced them to perform against their will, insulted their character and signed various contracts on their behalf without explaining the details; a lawsuit was filed on their behalf. The dispute was amicably resolved between the two parties on April 28, 2011, with the members returning to DSP Media.

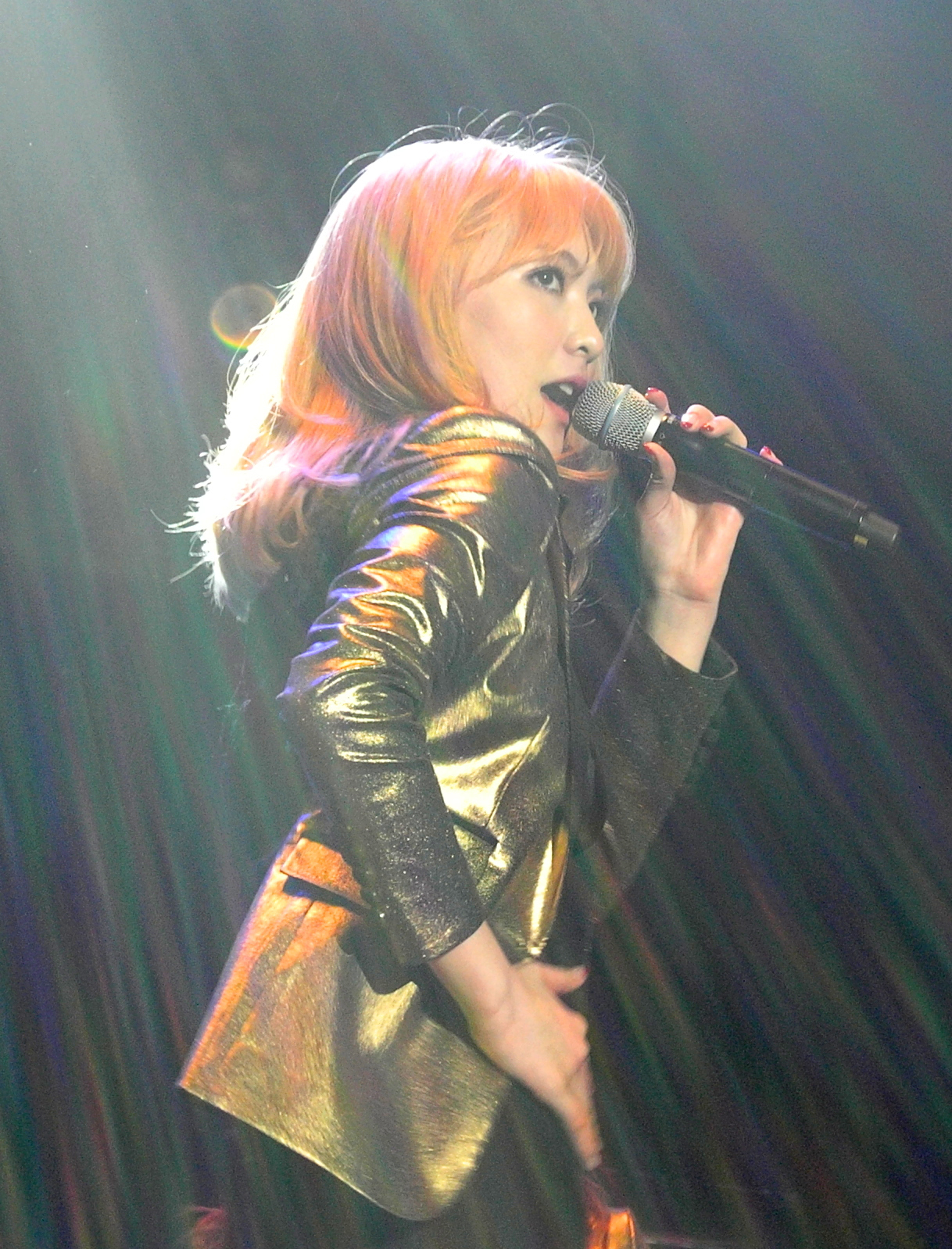
Kang performing at the 2013 DSP Festival

Kang joined the cast of the second season of the KBS reality show Invincible Youth in October 2011. The series premiered on November 11, 2011, and the last episode aired on November 17, 2012. Also in October 2011, Kang was cast as the lead role in the romantic drama series Rainbow Rose. The show was developed as a South Korean and Japanese co-production, and was partially funded by the Korean Film Council. Consisting of 12 episodes, the series premiered in Japan on TV Tokyo on April 13, 2012, and subsequently aired in South Korea on Tooniverse from September 7, 2012. Kang recorded the track "Rainbow Rose", which was used as the show's main theme. The song was later released digitally in South Korea on October 11 of that year.

In September 2012, Kang was cast in the espionage thriller series Iris II: New Generation, but dropped out in January 2013 due to creative differences between the network and Kang's agency. Kang released her solo single "Wanna Do" on November 30, 2012, in support of the compilation album Kara Solo Collection. The music video, co-starring Park Geon-il, was released on the same day. She performed the song on the SBS music program Inkigayo on December 16. As part of the 2012 SBS Gayo Daejeon, an end-of-year music festival, Kang joined fellow idols Sistar's Yoon Bo-ra, 4Minute's Heo Ga-yoon, Secret's Han Sun-hwa and After School's Lizzy, to form the supergroup Mystic White. They performed the charity single "Mermaid Princess" (인어공주) at the festival, and it peaked at number 10 on the Gaon Digital Chart.

On January 15, 2014, Kang announced her departure from Kara, citing a desire to study abroad and focus on her acting career. Following the end of her contract with DSP Media in April 2014, she moved to London to study English. Kang starred opposite Bae Soo-bin in the anthology series Secret Love, which began airing on the cable channel Dramacube on June 13, 2014. The series was directed by Kim Kyu-tae and filmed in May 2013, prior to Kang's departure from the group.

=== 2014–2016: Film and television breakthrough in Japan, and solo Japanese debut ===
While living in London, Kang was approached by the president of the Japanese talent agency, Sweet Power. She signed with the agency as an actress in August 2014, and subsequently moved to Japan. In September, Kang was cast in her first Japanese-language role as Yukime, a yuki-onna who has fallen in love with the main protagonist, in the live-action television adaptation of Hell Teacher: Jigoku Sensei Nube. The show consisted of ten episodes, and premiered on Nippon TV on October 11. For her role as Yukime, Kang was nominated for Best Supporting Actress at the Television Drama Academy Awards, hosted by Kadokawa. That same month, Kang starred in the police procedural television movie Higanbana: Women's Crime File, portraying Kaoruko Nagami, a researcher at the Tokyo Metropolitan Police Department. The movie aired on Nippon TV on October 24.

In 2015, Kang took a supporting role in the science-fiction comedy film Assassination Classroom as Irina Jelavić, a professional hitwoman working undercover as an English teacher. Directed by Eiichirō Hasumi, the film is an adaptation of Yusei Matsui's manga of the same name. Kang was chosen for the role for her ability to speak multiple languages. The film was released on March 21 in Japan, topping the domestic box office in its first weekend, and ultimately grossing a worldwide total of $25 million. The following month, Kang made a cameo appearance in the anime film Detective Conan: Sunflowers of Inferno, voicing the role of a museum guide. In May, Kang was cast in the political comedy drama series Tamiou, based on the novel of the same name by Jun Ikeido. She portrayed college student Erika Murano, the classmate of the prime minister's son Shō Mutō (played by Masaki Suda), and daughter of the leader of the opposition party (played by Masao Kusakari). The series premiered on TV Asahi on July 17, 2015. Kang earned a nomination for Best Supporting Actress at the Television Drama Academy Awards for the role. Kang's final role of the year was in the short film How Is the Sky Over There?, a promotional film for Kit Kats in Japan that premiered on Nestlé Theater's YouTube channel on December 3, 2015. The film was shot between Hong Kong and Japan, and Kang took classes for Mandarin and Cantonese for the role.

Kang signed to Sony Music Japan in December 2015, and announced that she would be resuming her music career under the alias JY. In January 2016, Kang reprised the role of Nagami in Whispers from a Crime Scene, a sequel series to Higanbana: Women's Crime File. She provided the theme song for the series, titled "Saigo no Sayonara" ("The Last Farewell"), which also served as her debut Japanese single. The single was released digitally on February 3 and physically the following month, and peaked at number seven on the Oricon Singles Chart. Her follow-up single "Radio" was also featured in Whispers from a Crime Scene, and marked her first English-language song. Released on March 16, the song was supported by a three-track extended play of the same name, with two of the tracks featuring production and songwriting from British singer MNEK. A music video for "Radio" was released, alongside a video for the B-side track "I'm Just Not Into You". Upon release, "Radio" reached number one on the iTunes Top Pop Songs chart in Japan.

In March 2016, Kang reprised the role of Irina Jelavić in Assassination Classroom: Graduation, the sequel to Assassination Classroom (2015), with Hasumi returning as director. The film received positive reviews and grossed $31.3 million worldwide, becoming the eighth-highest-grossing Japanese film of 2016. Her next role was in the short film Life Is..., portraying Yuna, a photography student living in Kyoto who is tasked with taking a photograph that captures the concept of "umami". The short was directed by Leslie Kee, and premiered on YouTube in June 2016 via Nestlé Theater. The following month, she acted in the anthology film Unrequited Love, playing So-yeon, a South Korean exchange student struggling with their gender identity who falls in love with their roommate.

=== 2016–2018: Many Faces, musical theater, and further acting success ===
Kang released her second Japanese single, and third overall, titled "Suki na Hito ga Iru Koto" ("There's Someone I Like") in August 2016. The music video was filmed in Guam and directed by Mika Ninagawa. The song was used as the main theme for the Fuji TV drama series A Girl & Three Sweethearts, with Kang making a cameo appearance in the final episode. Upon its release, the single reached number one on all 12 major domestic distributors, including iTunes and Recochoku. It went on to peak at number three on the Billboard Japan Hot 100 and number six on the Oricon Singles Chart, becoming her highest-charting single on both charts. The single was certified twice by the Recording Industry Association of Japan (RIAJ), achieving a platinum certification for digital sales, and a gold certification for streaming.

That same year, Kang played the lead role of Charity Hope Valentine in the Tokyo Galaxy Theater production of Sweet Charity, with the musical being directed and translated from English to Japanese by Yukio Ueshima. The production had a limited run from September 23 to October 2, 2016. Kang later starred in the made-for-television detective film Mission Commander Ayaka Goma, which premiered on Fuji TV on October 22, 2016. In November, she made a guest appearance in the TV Asahi medical drama Doctor-X: Surgeon Michiko Daimon, portraying Yuka Nanase, a deaf woman who assists a pianist who is losing his hearing. She studied Japanese Sign Language for the role. Kang released her third and fourth Japanese singles, "Fake" and "Koiwo Shiteitakoto" ("I Was in Love") simultaneously on December 7, 2016. Both singles peaked in the top 25 on the Oricon Singles Chart.

In January 2017, Kang starred in an episode of the Kansai TV anthology series Osaka Loop Line: Part 2. In April, Kang recorded the theme song for the Fuji TV romantic comedy It's All About the Looks, titled "Joshi Modoki" ("Look-alike Girl"), which also served as the lead and final single from her debut solo album, Many Faces. The single performed modestly, and peaked at number 28 on the Billboard Japan Hot 100. Many Faces was released on May 3, containing eight new songs, as well as the previous six singles and the B-side "I'm Just Not Into You", for a total track listing of 15 tracks. In support of the album, Kang embarked on a three-stop tour, performing in Nagoya, Osaka and Tokyo. She also hosted a pop-up costume exhibition at Tower Records in Shibuya, and performed on the AbemaTV music programme Drive Music. Many Faces peaked at number 12 on both the physical and digital Oricon Albums Charts, remaining on both charts for 10 weeks. A direct-to-video concert film of the album was released on September 27.

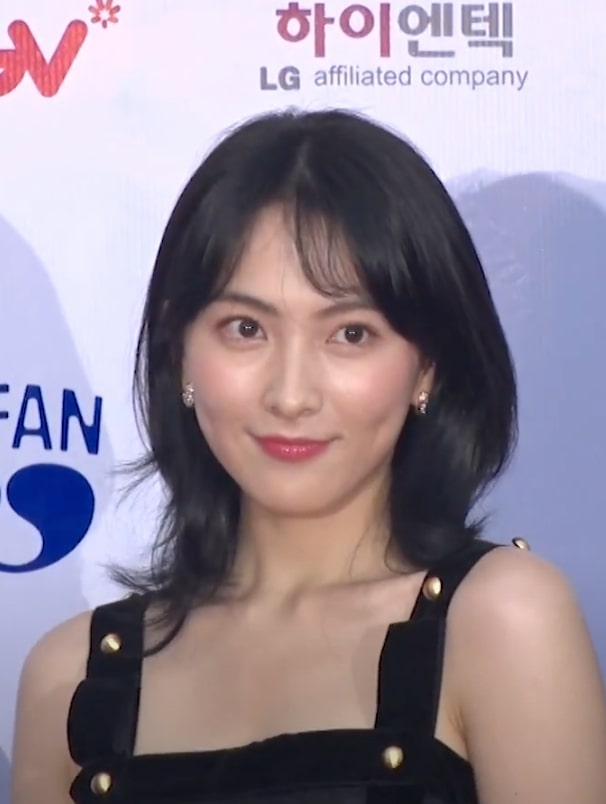
Kang at the 2018 Bucheon International Fantastic Film Festival

=== 2020–present: Return to South Korea, and Kara reunion ===
In February 2022, it is reported that Kang has decided not to renew her contract with KeyEast. On April 6, 2022, it was announced that Kang signed with ELRIS Entertainment.

In July 2022 Kang released Project solo Lucid Dream. For Kara's fifteenth anniversary in 2022, Jiyoung reunited with members Gyuri, Seungyeon, Nicole, and Youngji and released the extended play Move Again. She subsequently embarked on the group's fifth and sixth Karasia tours in 2024 and 2025.

In 2025, Kang served as one of the judges on the reality singing competition program Korea–Japan King of Singers: Japan Round, a Japanese spin-off of the South Korean MBN series Korea–Japan King of Singers. It premiered on Fuji TV on January 16.

== Impact ==
Early in her career, Kang received media attention for her tall height relative to her bandmates and despite her young age, and was affectionately nicknamed "Giant Baby" by the press. In August 2011, Kang was the only Korean artist to be featured on the Count Down TV Top 30 Annual Favourite Female Artist Ranking, placing at number 21. Kang was the third most-tweeted about female celebrity in Japan in 2016. In November 2016, Kang was listed as seventh in a list of the biggest female breakout artists of that year in Japan, compiled by Oricon News.

=== Ambassadorship ===
In September 2022, Kang guest lectured at the Youth Film Experience School located in Seoul's theater district Daehangno, teaching in the singing department. In November 2024, Kang was appointed as the film industry ambassador for the 2025 Seoul Barrier-Free Film Festival, a non-profit organization which produces, screens and distributes films for blind and deaf audiences.

== Other activities ==
=== Modeling and endorsements ===
In October 2011, Kang made her runway debut walking for Lie Sang Bong's S/S 2012 collection at Seoul Fashion Week. She attended Seoul Fashion Week the following year, as a guest for Steve J and Yoni Pare's S/S 2013 collection. In September 2014, Kang was chosen to walk the Reebok runway at the Tokyo Girls Collection F/W 2014 show. That same year, Kang became an exclusive model for women's fashion magazine Non-no, making her first solo cover appearance for its December issue. In March 2016, Kang was appointed as an official ambassador for Mercedes-Benz Fashion Week in Tokyo. Between March and April 2017, Kang's portraits, photographed by Leslie Kee, were featured as part of the Mode/Muse exhibition held at the Parco Museum in Shibuya. Kang modeled at the Kansai Collection S/S 2017 fashion show. In May 2017, she made an appearance at the GirlsAward S/S fashion show, both as a runway model for the Non-no collection, and as a musical guest.

Kang was previously the face of brands Union Bay, Nature Republic, and Karaya. In 2015, she was selected as a global brand ambassador for the confectionery brand Kit Kat. Kang appeared in several Japanese commercials to promote the expansion of the number of Kit Kat Chocolatory stores in the country. She also appeared in tie-in promotional material for the Hong Kong, South Korean and Taiwanese markets, including numerous short films. Since 2022, Kang has been a spokesmodel for the hair care brand Unda Hair. In 2025, she was appointed as a brand ambassador for sportswear company Mizuno. That same year, she was announced as a model for the beauty brand Osaji.

=== Business ventures ===
In July 2025, Kang collaborated with the Nakajima Brewing Company to develop a premium sake brand, Kikyuka.

== Discography ==
=== Studio albums ===
Title	Album details	Peak positions	Sales
Title	Album details	JPN	Sales
Many Faces ~Tamensei~ (Many Faces～多面性～)	Released: May 10, 2017 (JPN); Language: Japanese; Label: Sony Music Records; Format: CD, DVD, digital download	12	JPN: 13,421

=== Extended plays ===
Title	Album details	Peak positions	Sales
Title	Album details	JPN	Sales
Hoshi ga Furu Mae ni (星が降る前に)	Released: March 28, 2018 (JPN); Language: Japanese; Label: Sony Music Records; Format: CD, DVD, digital download	114	—N/a

=== Singles ===
==== As lead artist ====
Title	Year	Peak positions			Sales (Note: Korean single section is a digital sales only by Gaon Music Chart and Japanese single section is a CD single sales by Oricon)	Album
Title	Year	KOR	JPN	JPN Hot	Sales	Album
"Merry Love" (with Kim Sung-je)	2010	—	—	16	—N/a	Non-album singles
"My Love" (with Park Gyu-ri)	2010	—	—	—	—N/a	Daemul OST
"Rainbow Rose"	2012	—	—	—	—N/a	Rainbow Rose OST
"Wanna Do"	2012	100	—	—	KOR: 32,128	Kara Solo Collection
"Radio" (Note: "Radio" was an English digital single with two B-side song. It was released by Sony Music Japan in Japan and international.)	2016	—	—	69	JPN: 8,850 (digital)	Many Faces
"Saigo no Sayonara" (最後のサヨナラ)	2016	—	7	10	JPN: 17,104	Many Faces
"Suki na Hito ga Iru Koto" (好きな人がいること)	2016	—	6	3	JPN: 31,099; RIAJ: Platinum (digital); RIAJ: Platinum (streaming)	Many Faces
"Fake" (フェイク)	2016	—	25	—	JPN: 5,378	Many Faces
"Koiwo Shiteitakoto" (恋をしていたこと)	2016	—	24	—	JPN: 5,547	Many Faces
"Joshi Modoki" (女子モドキ)	2017	—	—	28	—N/a	Many Faces
"Goldmine"	2017	—	—	—	—N/a	Non-album singles
"Secret Crush - Koi Yamerarenai / My ID" (Secret Crush ～恋やめられない～)	2017	—	29	—	—N/a	Non-album singles
"Namida no Riyuu" (涙の理由)	2018	—	—	—	—N/a	Non-album singles
"Lucid Dream"	2022	—	—	—	—N/a	Non-album singles
"—" denotes releases that did not chart or were not released in that region.

==== As featured artist ====
Title	Year	Peak positions		Sales	Album
Title	Year	KOR	KOR Hot	Sales	Album
"Nunibusyeo" (눈이부셔) (Jumper feat. Ji-young)	2009	—	—	—N/a	Non-album singles
"Mermaid Princess" (인어공주) (with Yoon Bo-ra, Lizzy, Han Sun-hwa, Heo Ga-yoon)	2012	10	12	KOR: 257,342	Mystic White
"—" denotes releases that did not chart or were not released in that region.

=== Other appearances ===
Song	Year	Other artists	Album
"Hayangyeoul" (하얀겨울) (Mr.2 cover)	2011	Nicole Jung, Han Seung-yeon	Immortal Song 2: Christmas Special

=== Video albums ===
Title	Album details	Peak positions	Sales
Title	Album details	JPN	Sales
JY 1st LIVE TOUR "Many Faces 2017"	Released: September 27, 2017 (JPN); Language: Japanese; Label: Sony Music Records; Format: Blu-ray	35	—N/a

=== Songwriting credits ===
List of songs, showing year released, artist name, and name of the album
Title	Year	Artist(s)	Album	Composer	Lyricist	Ref.
"Wanna Do"	2012	Herself	Kara Solo Collection	No	Yes	
"Sayonara Watashino Shojyo" (さよなら私の少女; lit. "Farewell, My Girl")	2016	Herself	"Saigo no Sayonara" (single)	No	Yes	
"Suki na Hito ga Iru Koto" (好きな人がいること; lit. "The One I Love is Here")	2016	Herself	Many Faces	No	Yes	
"Hello Mr."	2016	Herself	"Suki na Hito ga Iru Koto" (single)	No	Yes	
"Koiwo Shiteitakoto" (恋をしていたこと; lit. "I Was in Love")	2016	Herself	Many Faces	No	Yes	
"Konomamade" (このままで; lit. "Like This")	2017	Herself	Many Faces	No	Yes	
"Letter"	2017	Herself	Many Faces	No	Yes	
"Secret Crush" (Secret Crush ～恋やめられない～; lit. "Secret Crush – Can't Stop Loving")	2017	Herself	Non-album singles	Yes	Yes	
"Lucid Dream"	2022	Herself	Non-album singles	No	Yes	
"Happy Hour"	2022	Kara	Move Again	No	Yes	
"When I Move"	2022	Kara	Move Again	Yes	Yes	
"Oxygen"	2022	Kara	Move Again	No	Yes	

== Filmography ==
Key
†	Denotes productions that have not yet been released

=== Film ===
Year	Title	Role	Notes	Ref.
2015	Assassination Classroom	Irina Jelavić		
2015	Detective Conan: Sunflowers of Inferno	Museum Guide (voice)		
2015	How Is the Sky Over There?	Ena	Short film	
2016	Assassination Classroom: Graduation	Irina Jelavić		
2016	Life Is...	Yuna	Short film	
2016	Unrequited Love	So-yeon	Segment: "One-sided Love Spiral"	
2017	DC Super Heroes vs. Eagle Talon	Harley Quinn (voice)		
2018	Reon	Reon Takanashi		
2018	Though It Is My Life	Mizuho Kaneshiro		
2018	Yaru Onna: She's a Killer	Aiko		
2019	Tokyo Ghoul S	Itori		
2019	And Life Goes On	Han Yu-ri		
2019	Boom! Sukehira	Ayane Sukehira		
2021	Love and the Grand Tug-of-war	Yeo Ji-hyun		
2023	Love Reset	Sang-ah		
2024	Ginseng Boy	Jenny / Cheon Soon-ja		
2025	I Kill You	Kang Sun-woo / Han Ji-yeon	Theatrical cut version of miniseries	
2025	The First Ride	Sylvia		
2027	The Intertwining	Nanako		

=== Television ===
Year	Title	Role	Notes	Ref.
2008	Here He Comes	School girl	Cameo	
2009	Hero	Herself	Cameo	
2011	Urakara	Ji-young		
2012	Rainbow Rose	Han Yu-ri		
2013	Kara the Animation	Herself (voice)		
2014	Secret Love	Park So-yeol	Episode: "Lilac"	
2014	Hell Teacher: Jigoku Sensei Nube	Yukime		
2014	Higanbana: Women's Crime File	Kaoruko Nagami	Television film	
2015–2016	Tamiou	Erika Murano		
2016	Whispers from a Crime Scene	Kaoruko Nagami		
2016	A Girl & Three Sweethearts	Jun Yoshioka	Episode: "That's All"	
2016	Doctor-X: Surgeon Michiko Daimon	Yuka Nanase	Cameo (season 4, episode 7)	
2016	Mission Commander Ayaka Goma	Sonia	Television film	
2017	Osaka Loop Line: Part 2	Ji-hyun	Episode: "Tsuruhashi Station"	
2017–2018	Orphan Black – 7 Genes	Sara Aoyama / Maoko Shiina / various		
2018	Wish Upon a Star	Himeno	Episode: "One Week Until Fate"	
2019	Your Home Is My Business! Second Attack	Nana Miyadera	Cameo (episode 5)	
2019	And Life Goes On	Han Yu-ri		
2020	Sweet Munchies	Kim Ah-jin		
2022	Let Me Be Your Knight	Nina	2 episodes	
2023	Doctor Cha	Yoo Ji-seon	6 episodes	
2025	I Kill You	Kang Sun-woo / Han Ji-yeon		

=== Web series ===
Year	Title	Role	Ref.
2025	Vampire Tutor	Mi-ho	
2025	Don't Quit, Let's Kiss	Yu-bin	

=== Reality shows ===
Year	Title	Role	Notes	Ref.
2010	I Love Pets	Co-host	With Han Seung-yeon	
2010	Haha Mong Show	Cast member		
2011–2012	Invincible Youth	Cast member	Season 2	
2023	Beauty and Luxury	Co-host	With Park Gyu-ri	
2025	Korea–Japan King of Singers: Japan Round	Judge	Television special	
2025	Korea–Japan Top Ten Show	Guest judge	3 episodes	

=== Radio ===
Year	Title	Role	Station	Notes	Ref.
2009–2010	Kiss the Radio	Fixed guest DJ	KBS Cool FM	With Park Gyu-ri	
2009–2011	Stop the Boring Time	Fixed guest DJ	MBC Standard FM	Segment: "Tasting Corner"	
2015–2017	Jiyoung's Season of Knowledge	Host	Tokyo FM		

== Stage credits ==
Year	Production	Role	Notes	Ref.
2016	Sweet Charity	Charity Hope Valentine	Tokyo Galactic Theater	
2018	Love Letters	Melissa	Sogetsu Art Center	

== Concert tours ==
Headlining

JY 1st Live Tour "Many Faces 2017"
Date	City	Country	Venue
May 13, 2017	Nagoya	Japan	Zepp Nagoya
May 14, 2017	Osaka	Japan	Zepp Namba
May 21, 2017	Tokyo	Japan	Zepp DiverCity

Featured act

- GirlsAward (2017)
- LuckyFes (2024)

== Bibliography ==
Photobooks

- Reborn Me: Jiyoung Story (Kodansha, November 2014) ISBN 978-4-06-219148-7
- Grow Up! (Magazine House, August 2015) ISBN 978-4-8387-2775-9
- Gentle Beauty (Shogakukan, June 2016) ISBN 978-4-09-682221-0
- The First Stage (Tokyo News Service, September 2016) ISBN 978-4-86336-582-7

== Accolades ==
=== Awards and nominations ===
Year presented, name of the award ceremony, category, nominee of the award, and the result of the nomination
Year	Award	Category	Nominated work	Result	Ref.
2012	Mnet 20's Choice Awards	20's Upcoming 20's	Kang Ji-young	Nominated	
2015	Television Drama Academy Awards	Best Supporting Actress	Hell Teacher: Jigoku Sensei Nube	Nominated	
2015	Television Drama Academy Awards	Best Supporting Actress	Tamiou	Nominated	
2016	Television Drama Academy Awards	Best Supporting Actress	Whispers from a Crime Scene	Nominated	
2016	Television Drama Academy Awards	Best Drama Song	"Radio"	Nominated	
2016	Television Drama Academy Awards	Best Drama Song	"Saigo no Sayonara"	Nominated	
2016	Model Press Readers' Choice Awards	Next Artist Award	Kang Ji-young	Won	
2018	Okinawa International Movie Festival	Big Audience Award	Reon	Won	

=== Listicles ===
Year listed, name of publisher, name of listicle, and placement
Year	Publisher	Listicle	Placement	Ref.
2011	Count Down TV	Top 30 Annual Favourite Female Artist Ranking	21st	
2016	Oricon News	Top 10 Female Breakout Artists of 2016	7th	
