= Nicole Jung =

American singer (born 1991)

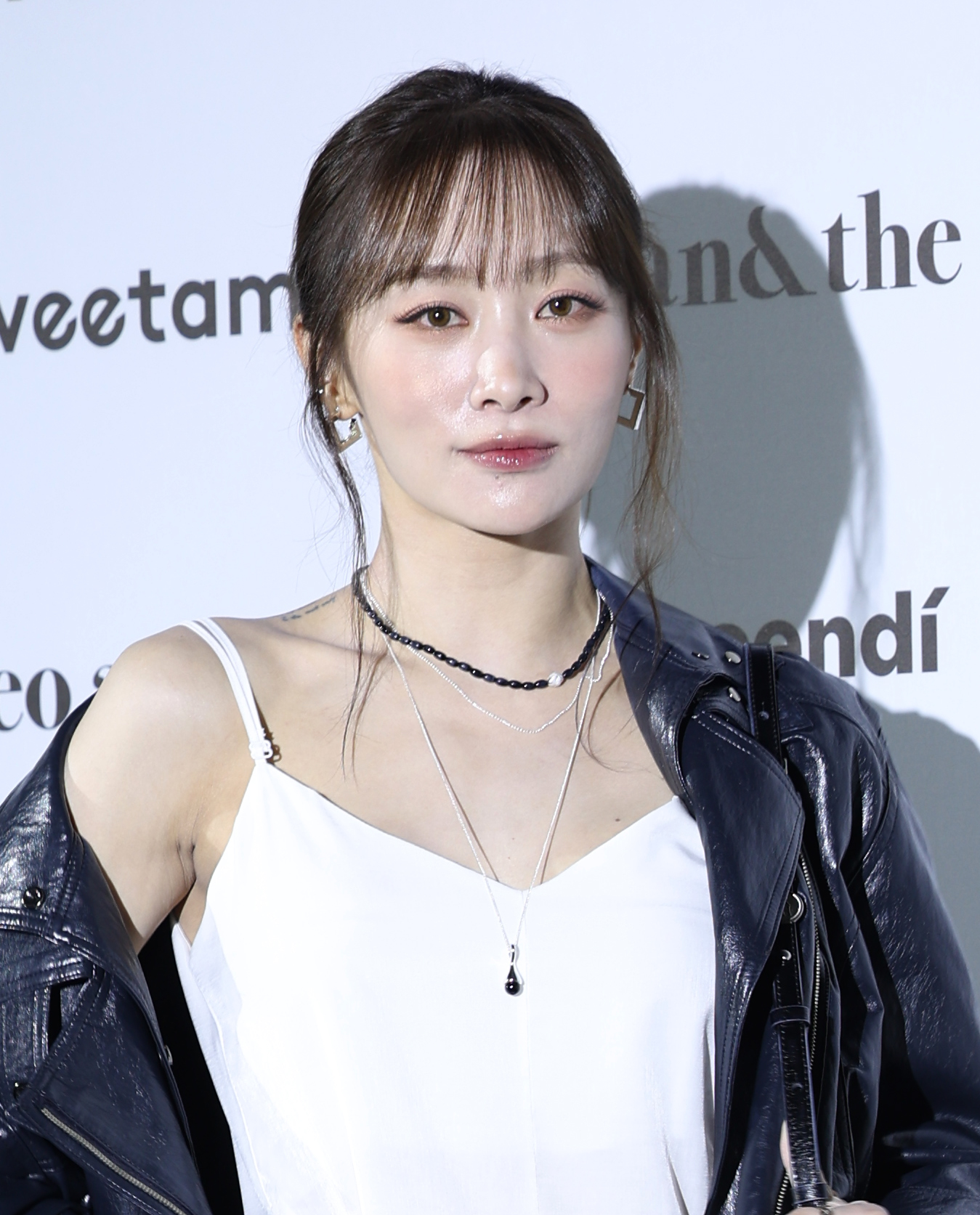
- Jung in 2026
- Born: Nicole Yongju Jung; October 7, 1991 (age 35); Glendale, California, U.S
- Other name: Jung Yong-ju
- Occupation: Singer
- Musical career
- Genre: K-pop
- Instruments: Vocals
- Years active: 2007–present
- Labels: iNKODE; Dreamusic
- Member of: Kara

Korean name
- Hangul: 정용주
- Hanja: 鄭龍珠
- RR: Jeong Yongju
- MR: Chŏng Yongju

Nicole Yongju Jung (Korean: 정용주; born October 7, 1991), referred to as Nicole, is an American singer. She is a member of South Korean girl group Kara. Her solo debut mini album, First Romance, was released on November 19, 2014.

== Early life ==
Jung was born on October 7, 1991 in Glendale, California to Korean parents. She attended Mark Keppel Elementary School and Toll Middle School in Glendale, California. She participated in choir, drill team, played the violin for 4 years and took dance classes. She auditioned for DSP Media by sending a video of her singing an Ivy and Black Eyed Peas song. Jung made the decision to go to South Korea and experienced hardships such as adjusting to the culture and missing her friends. She accepted DSP's offer, her mom moved with her to South Korea and has opened up a Korean BBQ restaurant called "Aura The Grill".

Jung was on a show called "KAIST" which was renamed to "Nicole The Entertainer's Introduction to Veterinary Science" in Konkuk University. The first episode aired on November 12, 2009. She "graduated" from college in January 2010.

== Career ==
=== 2007–2013: Activities with Kara ===
Jung debuted as the youngest member in Kara on March 29, 2007, with their single "Break It", alongside Park Gyuri, Han Seungyeon, and Kim Sunghee. In May, Sunghee departed from the group, and two members were added in July – Goo Hara and Kang Jiyoung.

On December 4, 2008, Kara released their 2nd mini-album "Pretty Girl", and in February 2009 came the follow-up album "Honey"; the latter's title track of the same name became the group's first #1 single on music shows when it topped M! Countdown and The Music Trend. In late July 2009, Kara released their second album named "Revolution". Owing to the popularity of the songs "Wanna" and "Mister", the group's overall popularity increased, and they followed with their third mini-album "Lupin".

In August 2010, Kara officially debuted in Japan with a Japanese version of their 2009 Korean single "Mister". After this, Kara released their fourth mini-album Jumping in South Korea in November 2010.

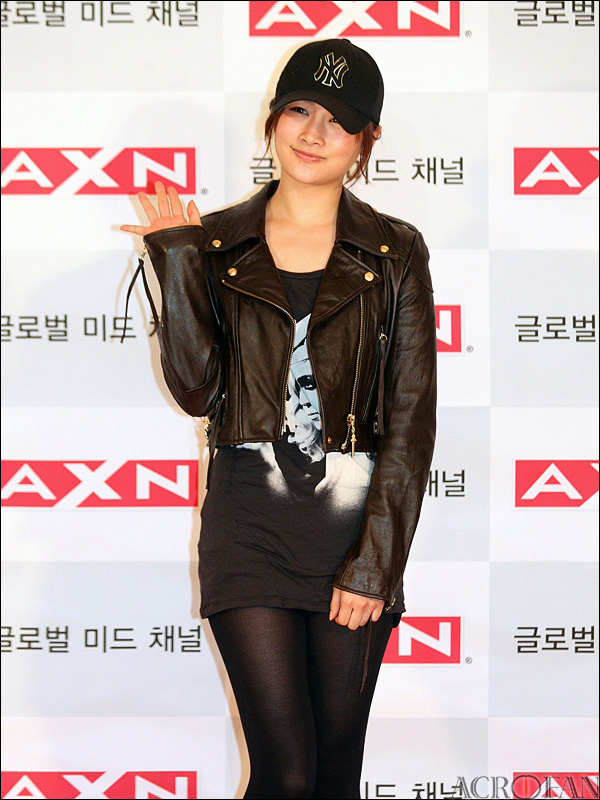
Jung at the AXN launch event in April 2011

On January 19, 2011, Jung announced, alongside fellow members Kang Jiyoung and Han Seung-yeon, that they were terminating their contract with DSP through court. On April 28, 2011, the dispute between DSP Media and Kara's 3 members was officially announced as resolved.

Jung injured her ankle during Kara's first stand-alone concert in Korea, which was held on February 18, 2012. She was performing a solo performance cover of Michael Jackson's "Beat It", when she hurt her ankle while leaving through a lift. After she got hurt, she did limp a little during performances but she still finished the concert. Afterwards in the dressing room, she received acupuncture for her injury. Despite her injury, she still performed on the very next day. Afterwards, Jung's injury was publicly revealed as she was photographed at airports in a wheelchair. Despite her injury, Nicole still hosted SBS "Inkigayo" with a cast on her leg. Owing to the ankle injury, she was unable to perform in group performance choreography during their Speed Up promotion in Japan from March to April 2012.

Kara has released Kara Collection in 2012, both in South Korea and Japan, an album containing each of the girls' solo songs. Jung's song was "Lost", which featured close friend Jinwoon.

Jung performed with the group for the last time at the 2013 MBC Gayo Daejejeon on December 31, 2013. The group performed a medley of their past hit singles along with "Damaged Lady", from the group's fourth album Full Bloom.

=== 2014: First Romance ===
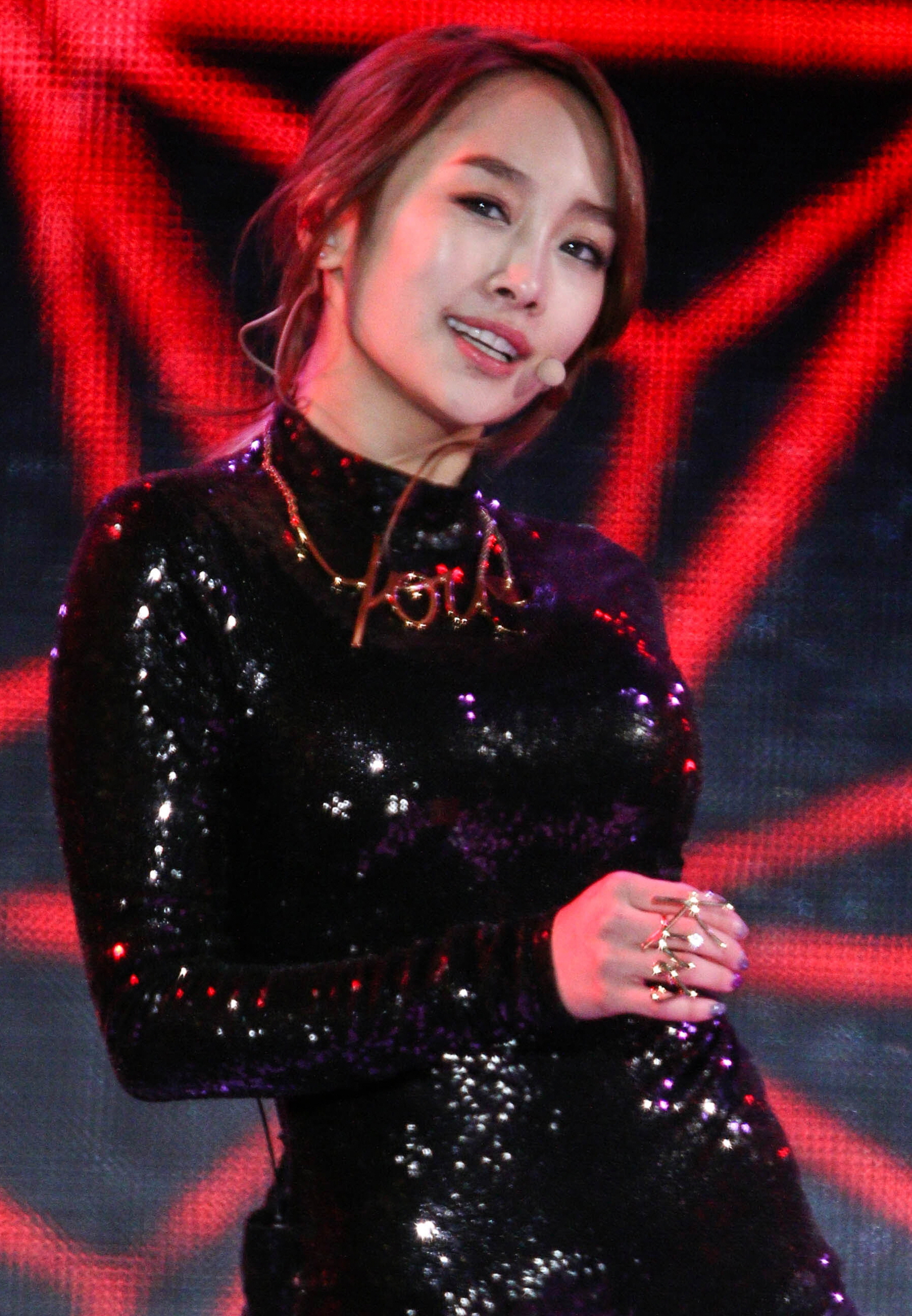
Jung performing at The Show in December 2014

On January 13, 2014, it was announced that Jung would be withdrawing from the group due to the expiration of her contract with DSP Media, and that she would be flying to the States for two months to focus on improving her vocal and dance skills while preparing to make a solo debut.

On October 14, 2014, Jung signed an exclusive contract with B2M Entertainment. The agency revealed, "Following the end of her contract with DSP Media, Nicole is currently preparing for her solo debut after confirming a new agency and completing the contract signing. Nicole's new agency was established by CEO Gil Jong Hwa, who had been with KARA from their debut to their peak. Since their connection under DSP Media, they have maintained close relations with one another."

Jung's solo debut mini album, First Romance was released on November 19, 2014, and the title song MAMA, which was used to promote the mini album. First Romance in November sold 8,754 copies. By the end of 2014, the mini album had sold 10,137 copies.

=== 2015–2022: Japanese debut with "Something Special", Bliss EP, and new agency ===
On April 22, 2015, it was revealed that Jung would debut in Japan on June 24. She performed her debut song before release at the 'KCON 2015 Japan X M! Countdown'. On June 17, she released a short PV of her debut single "Something Special". On June 24, Jung released the PV for "Something Special".

In December 2015, Jung released news that she would be coming back in Japan with her second Japanese single in 2016. It was revealed that the single would be called "Don't Stop" to be released on February 17. On January 16, she released a short PV version of "Don't Stop"

On March 2, 2016, Jung revealed on her Instagram that she would be releasing her first solo Japanese album, titled Bliss on April 27, 2016. The title track from the album is titled "HAPPY", the PV teaser was released on March 31, 2016. She had her first solo concerts titled "2016 Nicole The 1st Live" spanning two days, April 29, 2016, and May 1, 2016. She end her contract with CJ Victor in 2016 & B2M in 2017. She joined Diamond Music for her Japanese promotions.

In 2020, Jung opened a YouTube channel.

=== 2022–present: New agency ===
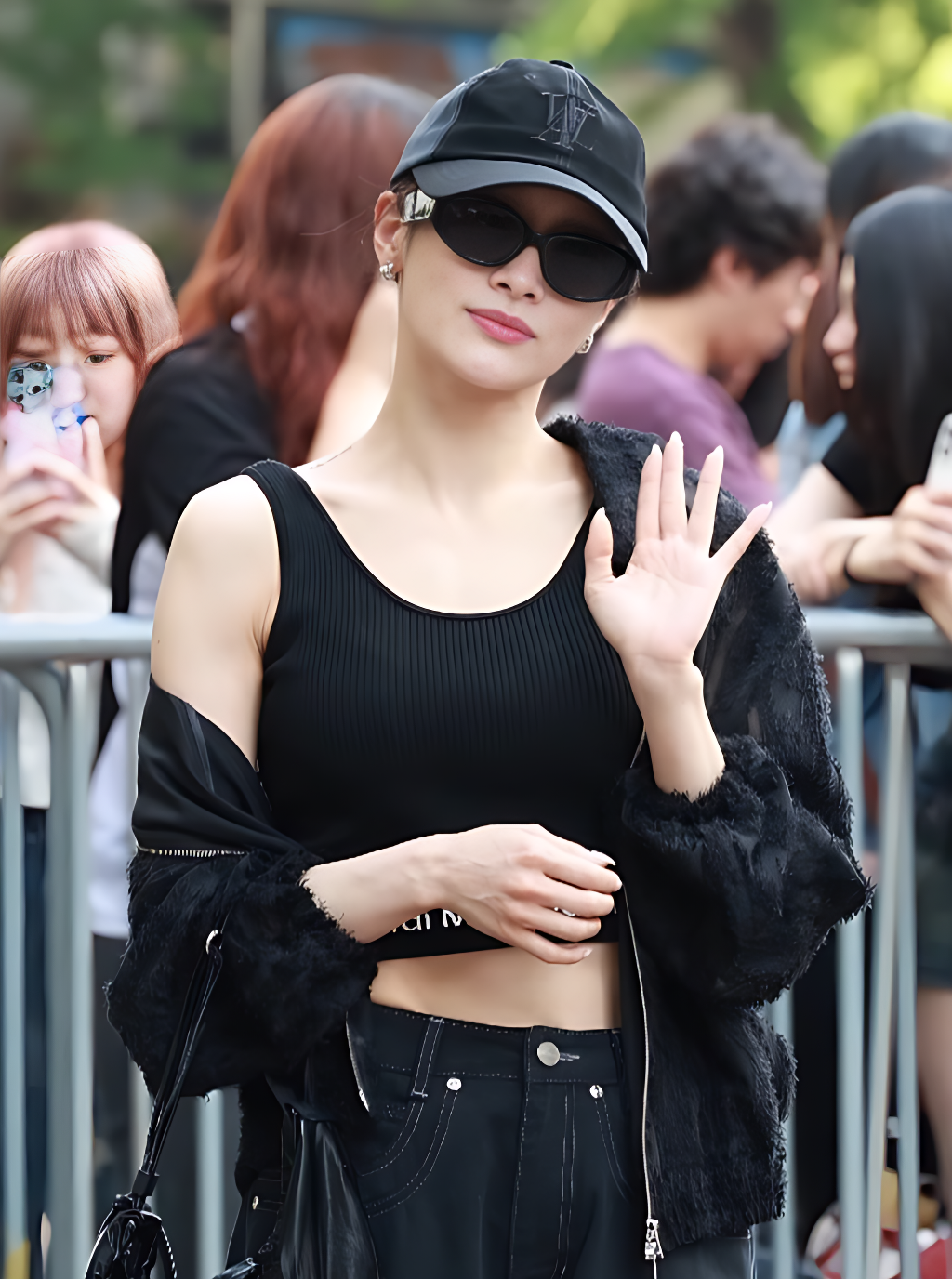
Jung at Music Bank in June 2024

In July 2022, Jung decided to sign with new label JWK Entertainment. It was also announced that she will return with the digital single "You.F.O" on July 27.

In February 2023, the agency will release a new digital single "Mysterious" which released on March 9. On February 18,2025, Jung joined "Inkode" home to artists "Say My Name" and Kim Jaejoong.

=== Solo activities and other works ===
Jung was featured on former DSP Media artist Sunha's first album Fahrenheit in the song "String" (2008). In April 2009, she sang a duet with former Noel member Kang Kyun-seong called "Happy And". In August 2009, she and singer Jay Park became part of historical culture variety show Nodaji, replacing Choi Min-yong and Kim Tae-hyun. The show was eventually cancelled due to low ratings in October 2009.

In September 2009, Jung was featured in numerous live performances of Mighty Mouth's single "Love Class". In July 2010, she sang a duet with Park Myung Soo for his single "Whale" (고래).

Jung was a member of "Dazzling Red", one of the idol project groups for the 2012 SBS Korean Music Festival – The Color of K-Pop concert with fellow idols After School's Nana, 4Minute's Hyuna, Secret's Hyoseong, and SISTAR's Hyorin. Dazzling Red released a single, "This Person", in December 2012.

Jung was invited to the 2013 MTV Video Music Awards Japan (as the only Korean artist invited that year) on June 22, 2013, and performed her solo song "Lost" from Kara Collection.

== Discography ==
=== Studio albums ===
Title	Album details	Peak chart positions	Sales
Title	Album details	JPN	Sales
Bliss	Released: April 27, 2016 (JPN); Label: CJ Victor Entertainment; Formats: CD, digital download	19	JPN: 6,204
"—" denotes releases that did not chart or were not released in that region.

=== Extended plays ===
Title	Album details	Peak chart positions	Sales
Title	Album details	KOR	Sales
First Romance	Released: November 19, 2014 (KOR); Label: B2M Entertainment; Formats: CD, digital download	5	KOR: 10,137
"—" denotes releases that did not chart or were not released in that region.

=== Singles ===
==== As lead artist ====
Title	Year	Peak chart positions			Sales	Album
Title	Year	KOR	JPN	JPN Hot	Sales	Album
Korean
"Lost" (feat. Jeong Jin-woon)	2012	85	—	—	KOR: 58,305	Kara Solo Collection
"Mama"	2014	69	—	—	KOR: 46,167	First Romance
"You.F.O" (Note: "You.F.O" was released physically exclusively in Japan in limited quantities.)	2022	— (Note: "You.F.O" did not enter the Circle Digital Chart, but debuted and peaked at number 101 on the Circle Download Chart.)	71	—	JPN: 390	Non-album singles
"Mysterious"	2023	— (Note: "Mysterious" did not enter the Circle Digital Chart, but debuted and peaked at number 105 on the Circle Download Chart.)	—	—	—N/a	Non-album singles
"5! 6! 7! 8! "	2024	—	—	—	—N/a	Non-album singles
Japanese
"Something Special"	2015	—	8	29	JPN: 12,268	Bliss
"Don't Stop"	2016	—	11	45	JPN: 8,418	Bliss
"Promise"	2019	—	—	—	—N/a	Non-album singles
"Selfish"	2023	—	27	—	JPN: 2,252	Non-album singles
"Gravity"	2023	—	26	—	JPN: 1,317	Non-album singles
English
"Champions (Prod.Tome&Jame)"	2019	—	—	—	—N/a	Non-album single
"—" denotes releases that did not chart or were not released in that region.

==== As featured artist ====
Title	Year	Peak chart position		Sales	Album
Title	Year	KOR	KOR Hot	Sales	Album
"Happy...And" (해피 엔드) (Kang Kyun-sung feat. Nicole)	2009	—	—		Non-album singles
"Gorae" (고래) (Park Myung-soo feat. Nicole)	2010	12	—		Non-album singles
"This Person" (이사람) (with Dazzling Red)	2012	2	6	KOR: 740,936	Non-album singles
"—" denotes releases that did not chart or were not released in that region.

=== Other appearances ===
Year	Title	Other artists	Album
2008	"Kkeun" (끈)	SunHa	Fahrenheit
2010	"Bingeul Bingeul" (빙글 빙글)	No Brain, SeungYeon, Gyuri	MBC Music Travel Lalala Live Vol.11
2011	"Hayangyeoul" (하얀겨울) (Mr.2 cover)	Kang Ji-young, Han Seung-yeon	Immortal Song 2: Christmas Special
2014	"Chalali Binunmul-e" (차라리 비눈물에)	Jung Il-woo	The Night Watchman OST
2020	"SYNERGY" (시너지)		Exos Heroes OST

=== Video albums ===
List of media, with selected chart positions
Title	Album details	Peak chart positions	Sales
Title	Album details	JPN	Sales
NICOLE CONCERT 2019～Summer Wave～	Released: February 12, 2020 (JPN); Label: Diamond Music; Formats: DVD	74	
"—" denotes releases that did not chart or were not released in that region.

== Filmography ==
=== Film ===
Year	Title	Role	Notes
2011	My Way	Press information clerk	Cameo
2013	KARA The Animation	Herself	Japanese dub

=== Television series ===
Year	Title	Notes
2008	The Person Is Coming	Gang of school girls, along with Park Gyu-ri, Goo Ha-ra and Kang Ji-young
2011	Urakara	Nicole
2014	Secret Love	Melly

=== Television shows ===
Year	Title	Notes
2008	Star Golden Bell (Level With Me Season 2)	MC
2010–2011	Heroes	Cast Member
2024	Ride the Wind 2024	Contestant

=== Hosting ===
Year	Title	Role
2011	Inkigayo	MC with Goo Ha-ra and IU
2013	27th Golden Disk Awards	Host with Jung Yong-hwa
2015	2015 International Campus Song Festival (ICSF)	Hosted with Eric Nam
2016	Beauty Station THE SHOW (Online series)	MC with Jeon Hye-bin and Donghyun
2018	Beauvly (Online series)	MC

== Bibliography ==
- Yamauchi Hiroe (June 7, 2019), Nicole First Photobook: hana. (in Japanese) (Softcover ed.), Tokyo: Kodokawa

== Awards and nominations ==
Year	Award	Work	Result
2009	3rd Mnet 20's Choice Award Hot New Variety Star	—N/a	Nominated
2012	Miss and Mister Idol Korea 2012	Miss Korea: 2nd Place	Won
2024	Weibo Music Awards 2024	Best Stage Charisma of the Year	Won
2024	Ride the Wind 2024	Best Stage of the Year	Won
