= 2002 Mnet Music Video Festival =

South Korean music awards ceremony

- Date: November 29, 2002
- Location: Little Angels Arts Center, Seoul, South Korea
- Hosted by: Shin Dong-yup and Kim Jung-eun
- Most awards: BoA (2)
- Most nominations: BoA (3)
- Website: Mnet Asian Music Awards

Television/radio coverage
- Network: Mnet (South Korea); Mnet Japan (Japan)
- Runtime: Approximately 206 minutes

The 2002 Mnet Music Video Festival (MMF) took place on November 29, 2002 at the Little Angels Arts Center in Seoul, South Korea. The show's most awarded artist was BoA who won two out of her three nominations.

== Background ==
The award-giving body continued to use the name "M.net Korean Music Festival" (MKMF) for the fourth consecutive year. It was also the fourth time for the event took place at the Little Angels Arts Center, Seoul, South Korea. The Grand Prize (Daesang) are the Best Popular Music Video Award and Music Video of the Year. Shin Dong-yup replaced him host Cha Tae-hyun.

The theme for the year's event was "Be the Reds!" which was popularized during the 2002 FIFA World Cup. Child actor Yoo Seung-ho presented an award while Japanese rock singer Hyde was the first Japanese to perform on the ceremony.

== Performers ==
Name(s)	Song(s)	Notes
Shin Hae Chul ft. 안흥찬	"The Shouts of Red 2002" (붉은 함성 2002) and "Into the Arena" medley	Special Performance 1 – Opening of the show
Shin Hae Chul ft. Psy	Killer	Special Performance 1 – Opening of the show
Kim Jung-eun ft. Shin Dong-yup for "fake" piano accompaniment	"I Will Always"	First appearance of the main hosts
Wheesung	"Can't I"	Best New Male Artist nominees (medley)
RIch	"The Only Word I Love You"	Best New Male Artist nominees (medley)
Rain	"Bad Guy"	Best New Male Artist nominees (medley)
Wheesung, RIch, and Rain	"End of the Road", "Music Makes Me High"	Best New Male Artist nominees (medley)
Shin Seung-hun	"Your Smile In My Memory", "You Are In The Higher Place Than I Am", "Invisible Love", and "Like the First Feeling"	from The Legend album
Moon Hee-joon	"Alone", "Persia Black Hole"	"Live Revolution – 100% Live Performance"
Expression	Hip Hop Dance	"Friday Night Fever" – 2002 Super Jam Part 2 (medley)
Jo PD ft. Dok2 and Hype	"Fever"	"Friday Night Fever" – 2002 Super Jam Part 2 (medley)
Ha Ri-su	"Angel Eyes"	"Friday Night Fever" – 2002 Super Jam Part 2 (medley)
Lee Soo-young ft. Jo PD	"La La La" remix	"Friday Night Fever" – 2002 Super Jam Part 2 (medley)
Shinhwa	"Wild Eyes", "Lost In Love", "Perfect Man"	"Perfect Man Show"
BoA	"Always", "No.1 (remix)"	"Beat Of Angel"
Lee Seung-hwan	"Live Hero" – Long Live Dream Factory album	"Lee Seung-hwan Special Stage"
Hyde	"Shallow Sleep", "The Cape of Storm"	Special Guest from Japan
BoA	"No.1"	Closing remarks (Most Popular Music Video awardee)

== Presenters ==
2002 Mnet Music Video Festival hosts

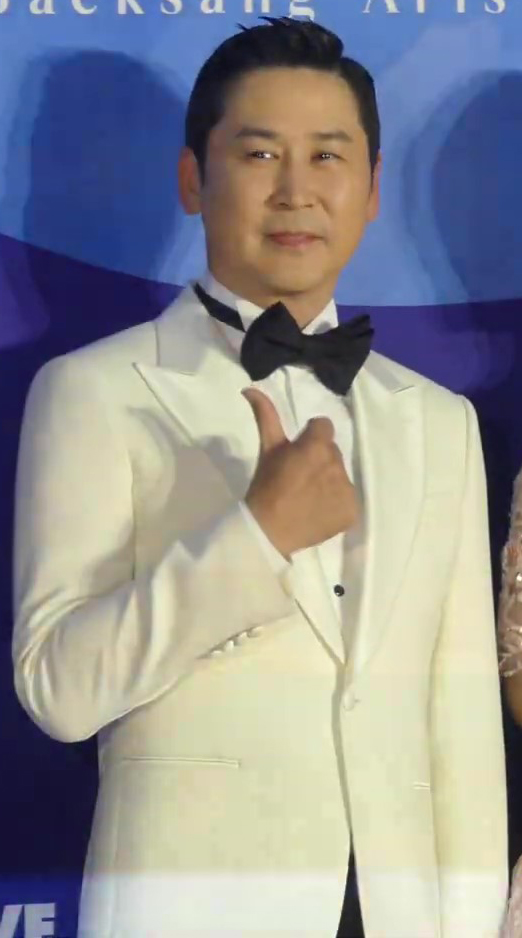
Shin Dong-yup

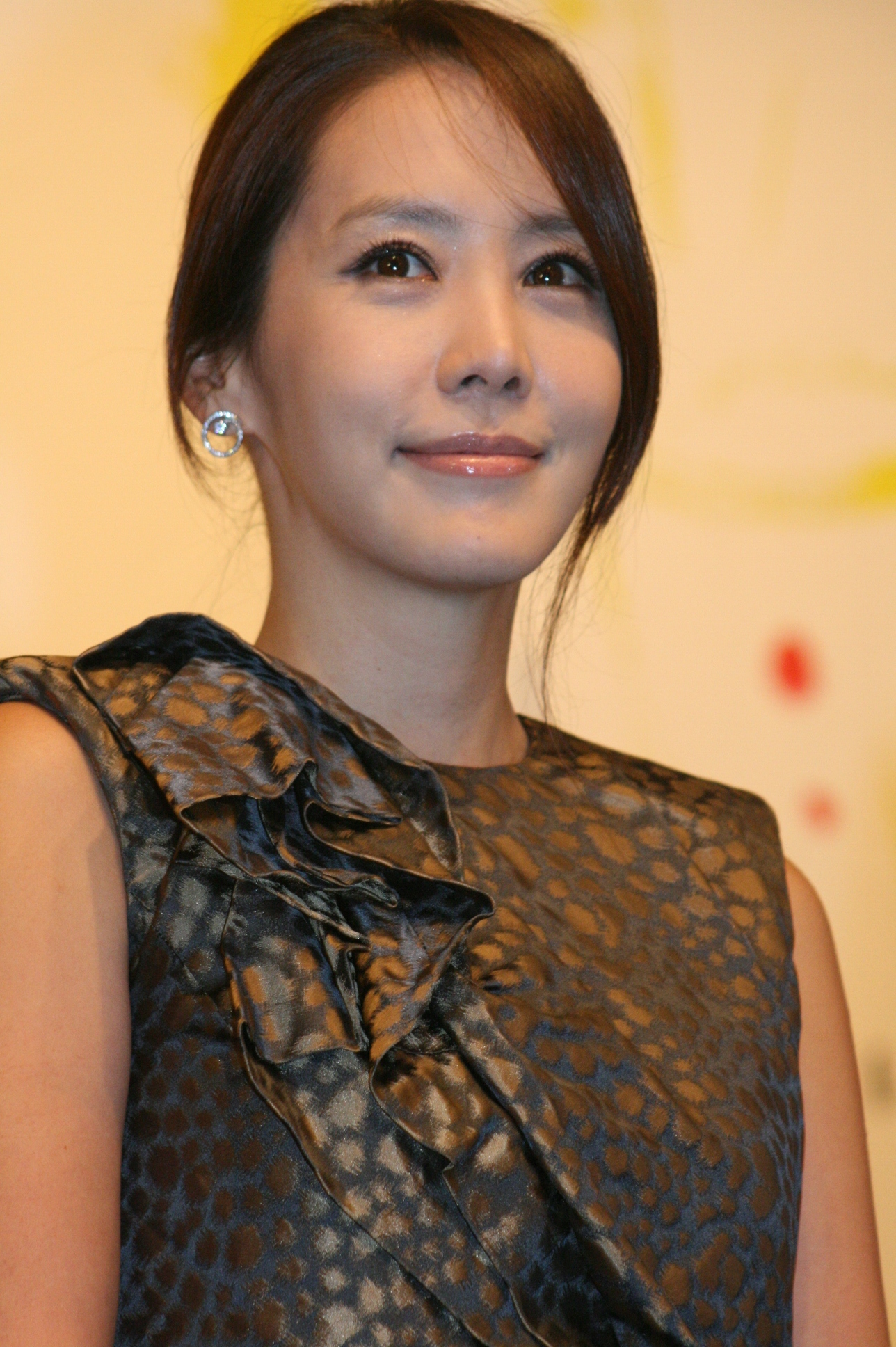
Kim Jung-eun

Name(s)	Role
Shin Dong-yup and Kim Jung-eun	Main hosts of the show
Lee Yu-ri and Sung Si-kyung	Presenters for the award for Best New Male Artist
Oh Seung-heon (오승헌) and Kim Nam-jin	Presenters for the award for Best New Female Artist
Son Tae-young and Kang Byung-kyu	Presenters for the award for Best New Group
Ahn Heung-chan (안흥찬) and Lee Yoon-seok (이윤석)	Presenters for the award for Best Rock Performance
Shin Hye-sung, Son Jeong-min, and Kim Dong-wan	Presenters for the award for Best International Artist
Hwang Jae-hak (황재학)	Presenter for the special award for Mobile Popularity Award
Shin Dong-yup	Introduced the VTR about Shin Seung-hun
Jung Tae-woo and Yuko Fueki	Presenters for the award for Best Mixed Group
Han Eun-jung and Lee Sung-jin (이성진)	Presenters for the award for Best Female Group
Lee Heon-jae (이헌재), Lee Se-eun, and Lee Won-jong	Presenters for the award for Best Male Group
Bak Junwon (박준원) and Lee Sang-yong (이상용)	Presenters for the award for Special Jury Prize
Ahn Byung-kyun (안병균)	Presenter for the special award for Netizen Popularity Award
Yang Mi-ra (양미라) and Rain	Presenters for the award for Best Indie Performance
Kim Yun-kyung (김윤경) and Park Gwang-hyun	Presenters for the award for Best Dance Performance
Shin Ae and Joo Young-hoon	Presenters for the award for Best Ballad Performance
Im Seong-min (임성민) and Lee Jong-won	Presenters for the award for Best R&B Performance
VJ Kim Young-won (김영원)	Best Hip Hop Performance
You Hee-yeol	Narrator for "Music Video Pioneer" – Lee Seung-hwan (VTR)
young Yoo Seung-ho and Kim Jin (김진)	Presenters for the award for Best Female Artist
Jo Yoon-hee and Jung Jae-young	Presenters for the award for Best Male Artist
Hwang Heon-jeong (황헌정) and Park Kwang-su	Presenters for the award for Best Music Video Director
Park Won-se (박원세)	Presenter for the special award for Music Video of the Year

== Winners and nominees ==
=== Selection process ===
During the initial screening, the committee selected the "Best 27" candidates in terms of rank. Both the professional jury and the fans chose their candidates from the nominees. Fans were able to vote online or through a number of downloads from the mobile system. The votes from the fans and the judges were then combined for the winners of each category.

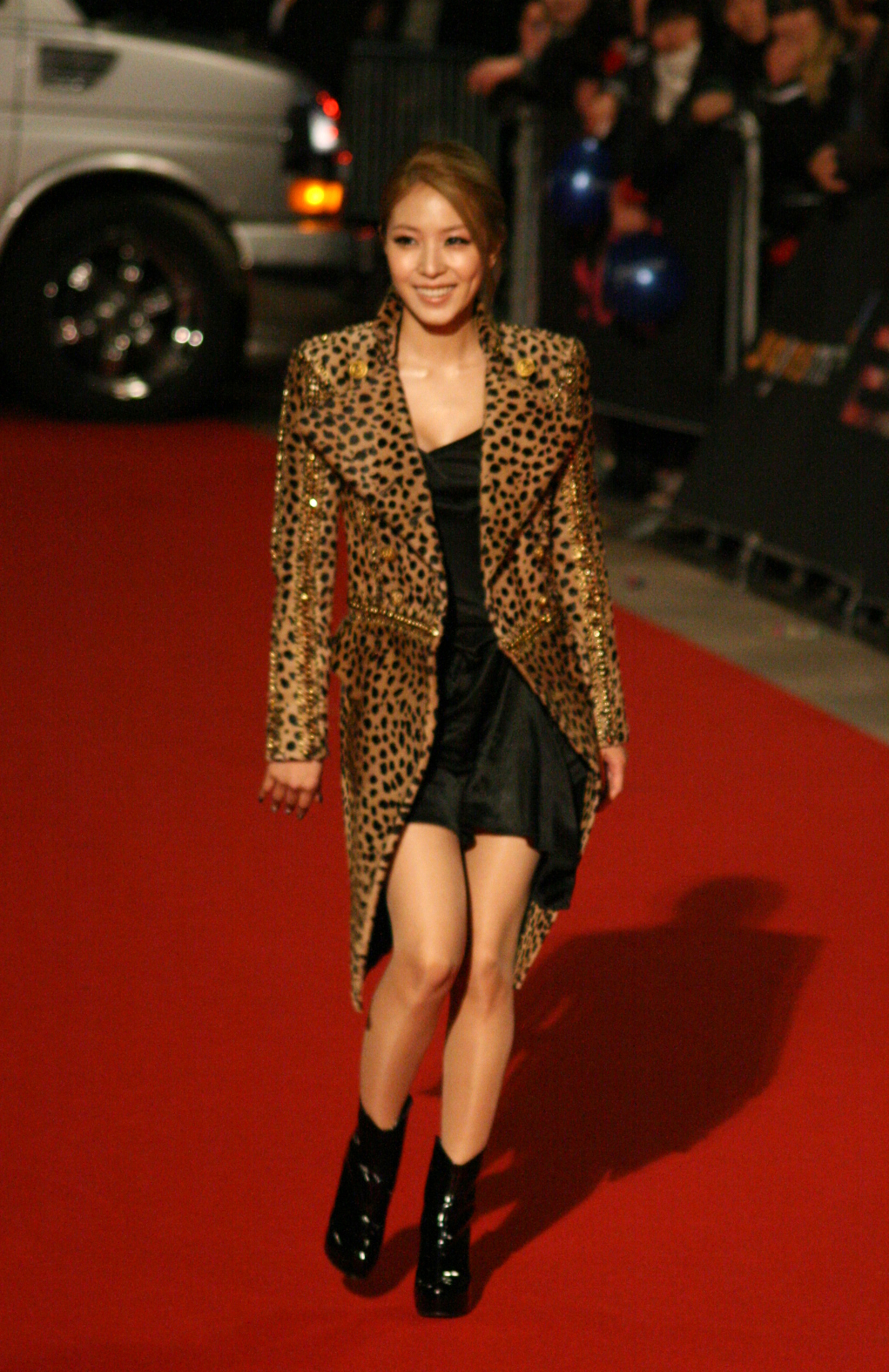
BoA won Most Popular Music Video and Best Dance Performance

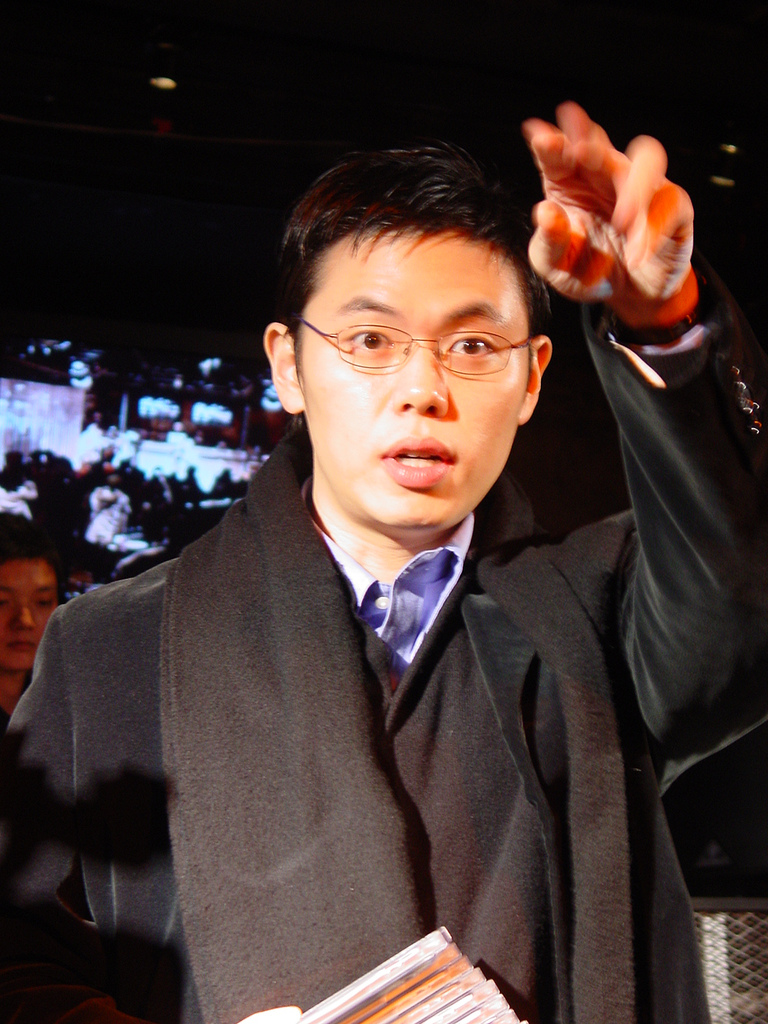
Jo PD won Music Video of the Year

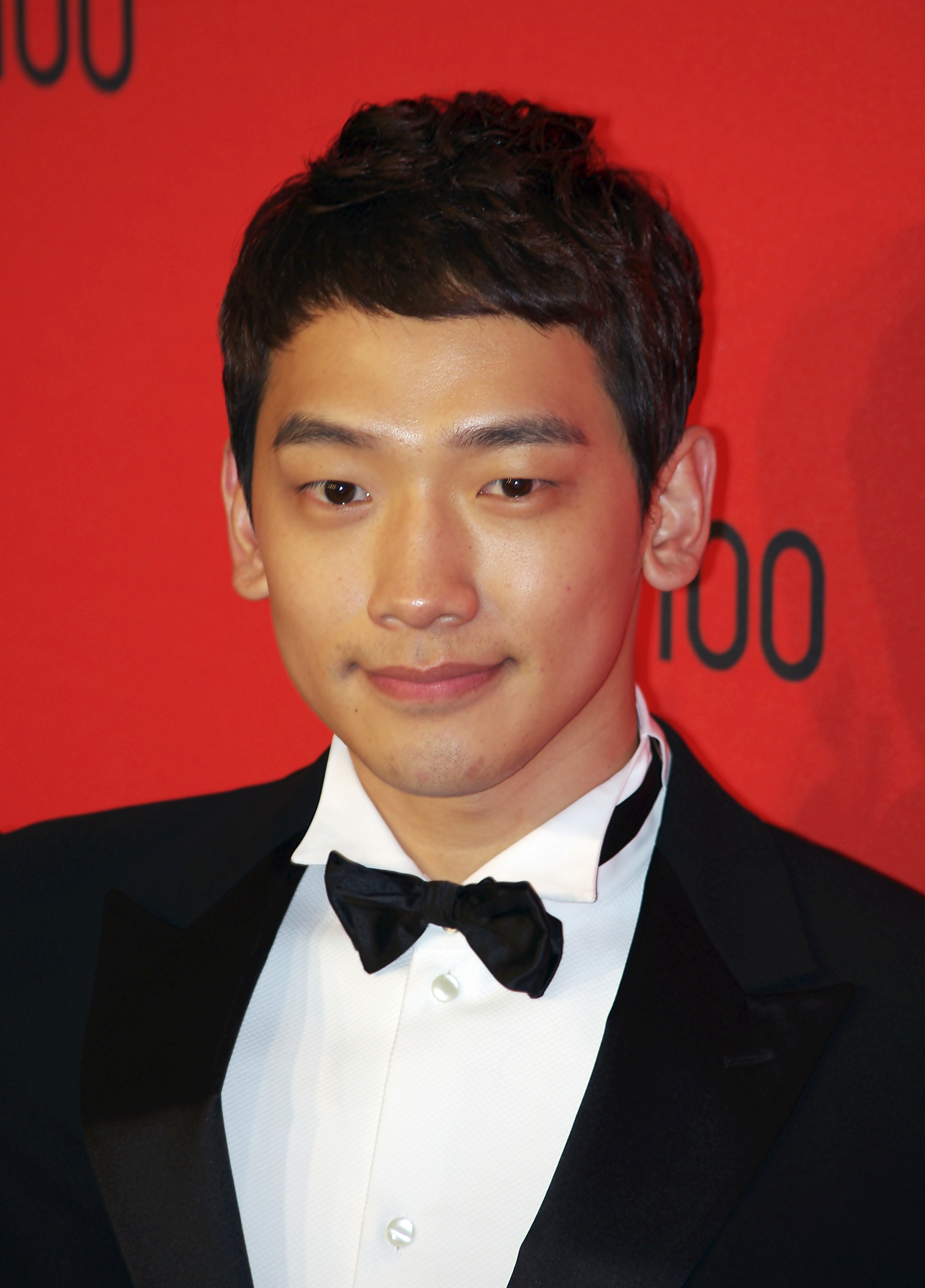
Rain won Best New Male Artist

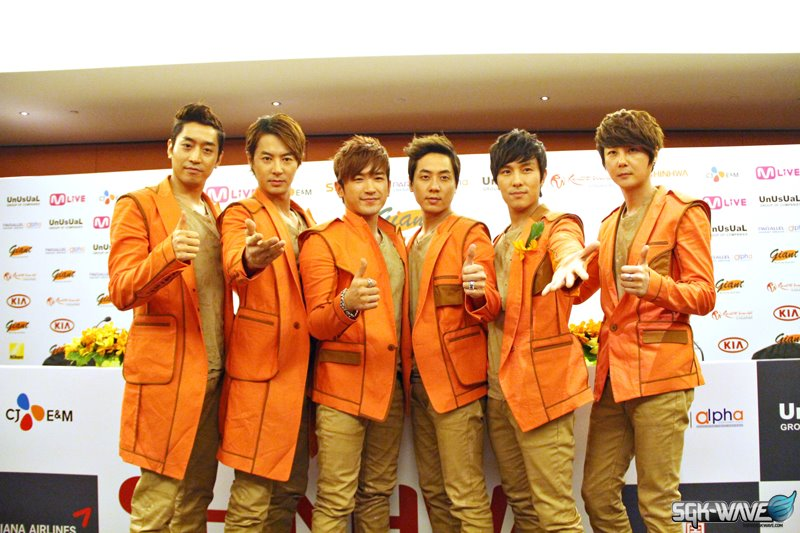
Shinhwa won Best Male Group

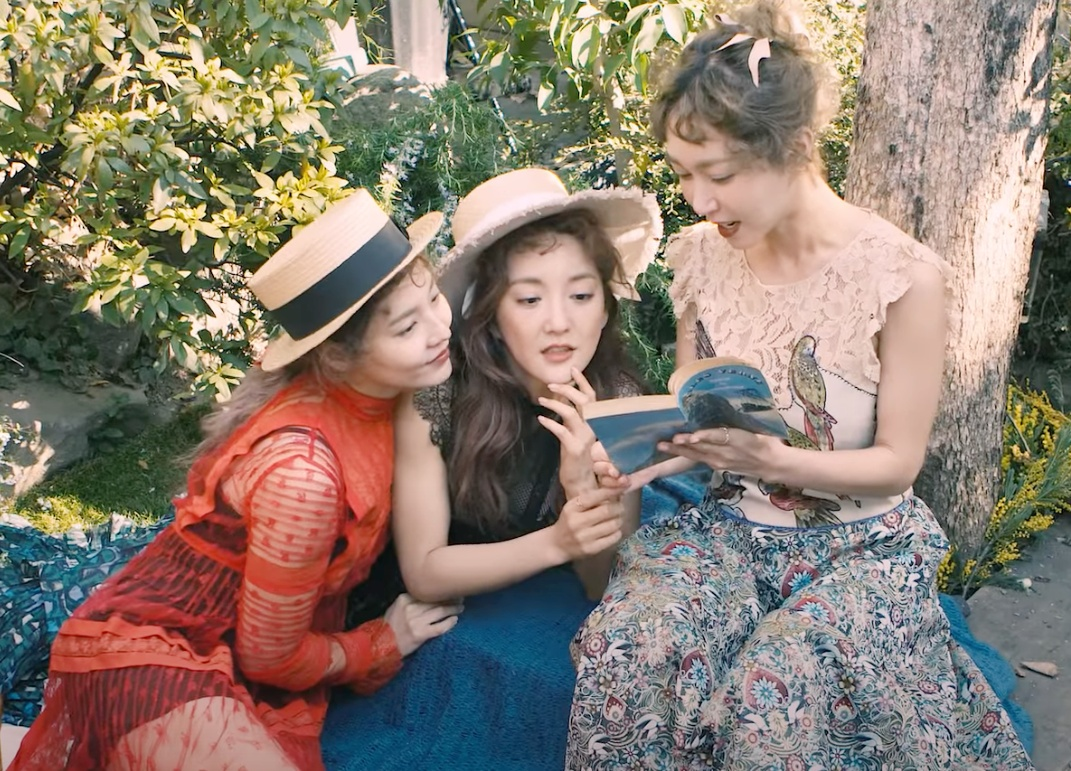
S.E.S. won Best Female Group

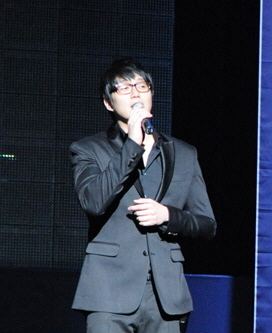
Sung Si-kyung won Best Male Artist

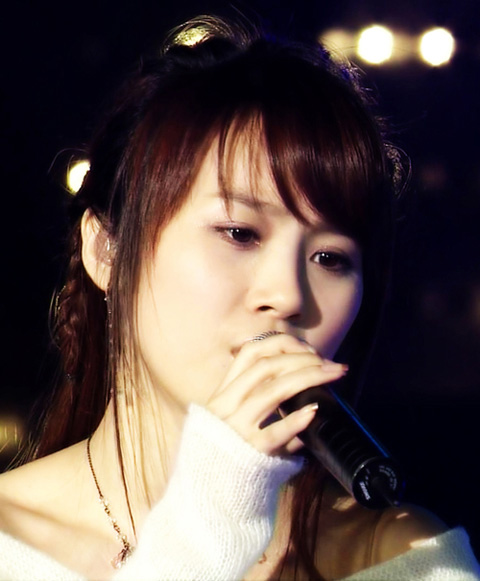
Lee Soo-young won Best Ballad Performance

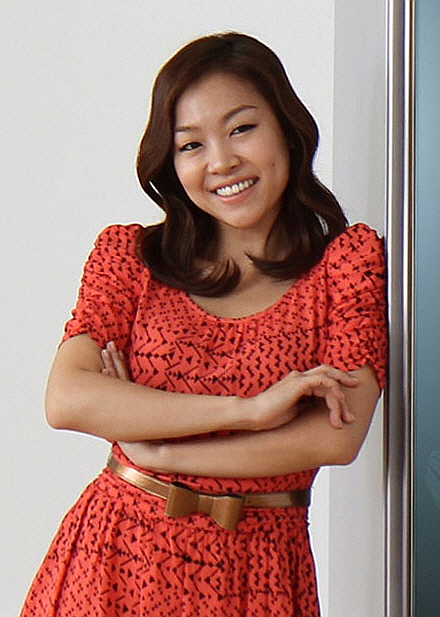
Lena Park won Best R&B Performance

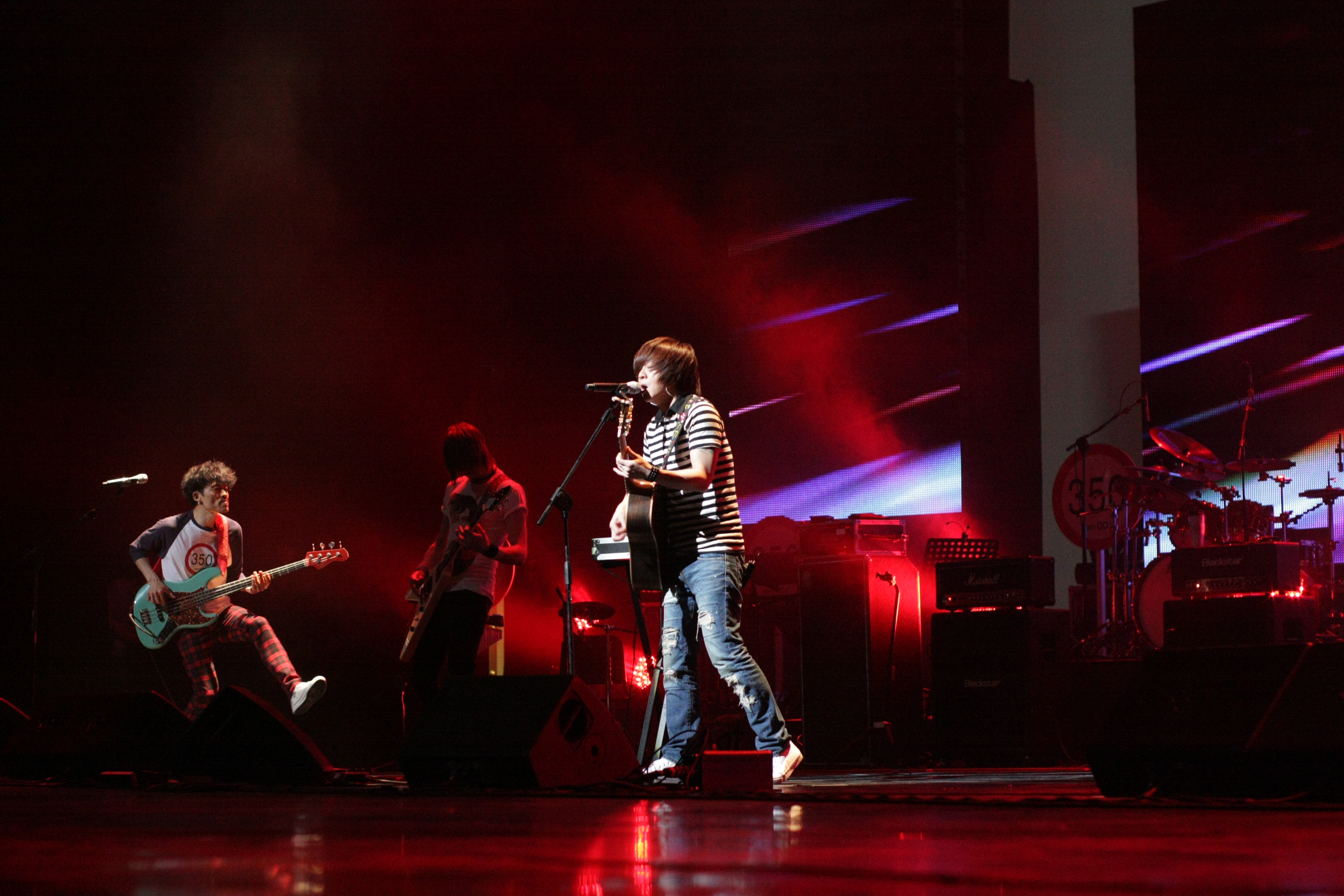
YB won Best Rock Performance

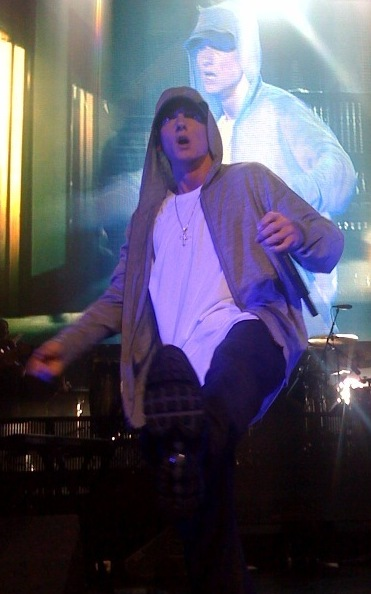
Eminem won Best International Artist

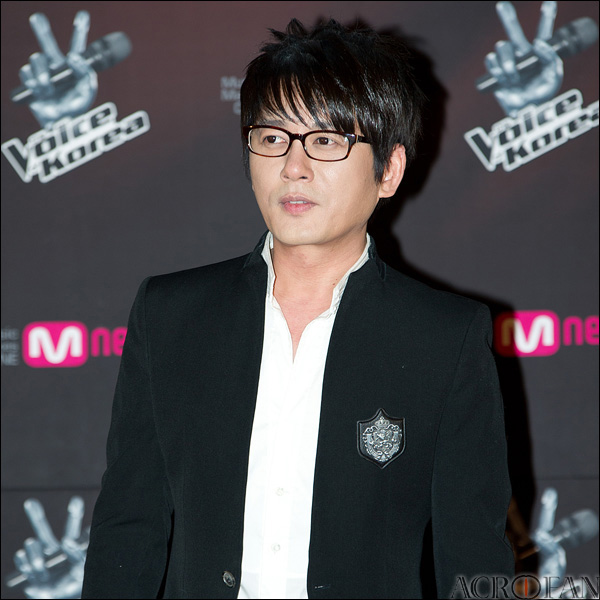
Shin Seung-hun won Special Jury Prize

Winners are listed first and highlighted in boldface.

Most Popular Music Video (Daesang)	Music Video of the Year (Daesang)
**BoA – "No. 1"**	**Cho PD – "My Style"**
Best New Male Artist	Best New Female Artist
**Rain – "Bad Guy"**; The Name – "The Name"; RIch – "Only The Words I Love You"; Sim Tae-yoon – "Mates" (짝); Wheesung – "Can't We"	**Youme – "Love Is Always Thirsty"**; Rinae – "Words Without Goodbye"; Shim Mina – "Answer the Phone"; Park Kyung-lim – "Illusion"; Ann – "Sick Sick Name"
Best New Group	Best Mixed Group
**Black Beat – "In The Sky"**; Turtles – "4 Seasons"; Milk – "Come To Me"; Sugar – "Tell Me Why"; Swi-T – "I'll Be There"	**The Jadu – "We Need To Talk"**; S#arp – "Kiss Me"; YTC – "Road"; Koyote – "Y"; Cool – "Truth"
Best Male Group	Best Female Group
**Shinhwa – "Perfect Man"**; J-Walk – "Suddenly"; jtL – "A Better Day"; g.o.d – "Road"; Click-B – "To Be Continued"	**S.E.S. – "U"**; Baby Vox – "Coincidence"; Chakra – "Come Back"; Jewelry – "Again"; Fin.K.L – "Forever"
Best Male Artist	Best Female Artist
**Sung Si-kyung – "We Make A Good Pair"**; Kangta – "Memories"; Moon Hee-joon – "Generous"; Shin Seung-hun – "If We Can Part Even Though We Love"; Lee Seung-hwan – "Mistake"	**Jang Na-ra – "Sweet Dream"**; Kim Hyun-jung – "Knife"; BoA – "No.1"; Wax – "Please"; Lee Soo-young – "La La La"
Best R&B Performance	Best Rock Performance
**Lena Park – "In Dreams"**; RIch – "I Have A Dream"; Hwayobi – "How is it"; Fly to the Sky – "My Heart"; Wheesung – "Can't We"	**YB – "Love Two"**; Roller Coaster – "Last Scene"; Boohwal – "Never Ending Story"; Jaurim – "That's it"; Cherry Filter – "Sweet Little Cat"
Best Hip Hop Performance	Best Indie Performance
**Leessang – "Rush" (ft. Jung-in)**; 1TYM – "Nasty"; MC Sniper – "BK Love"; Cho PD – "My Style"; Joosuc – "Infinity"	**Trans Fixion – "Come Back to Me"**; 3rd Line Butterfly – "Photosynthesis"; Lazy Bone – "Blue water"; Sugar Donut – "Bookshelf lady"; Johnny Royal – "Regeneration"
Best Dance Performance	Best Ballad Performance
**BoA – "No. 1"**; Kang Sung-hoon – "My Girl"; Shinhwa – "Perfect Man"; Lee Jung-hyun – "Half"; Harisu – "Liar"	**Lee Soo-young – "Lalala"**; Kangta – "Memories"; Park Hyo-shin – "Good Person"; Sung Si-kyung – "You Touched My Heart"; Im Chang-jung – "Sad Monologue"
Special Jury Prize	Best International Artist
**Shin Seung-hun – "If We Can Part Even Though We Love"**; Cho PD – "My Style"; Lee Seung-hwan – "Mistake"; Jang Na-ra – "Sweet Dream"; Byul – "December 32nd"; g.o.d – "Road"	**Eminem – "Without Me"**; Blue – "All Rise"; Britney Spears – "I'm Not a Girl, Not Yet a Woman"; Christina Aguilera – "Dirrty"; Linkin Park – "Points of Authority"; Shakira – "Objection (Tango)"; Stereophonics – "Have a Nice Day"
Best Music Video Director
**Cha Eun-taek**; Go Young-jun; Seo Hyeon-seung; Hong Jong-ho

=== Special awards ===
- Mobile Popularity Award: **Jang Na-ra – ("Sweet Dream")**
- Netizen Popularity Award: **Moon Hee-joon – "Generous" (아낌없이 주는 나무))**
- Music Video Pioneer Award: **Lee Seung-hwan**

== Artists with multiple wins and nominations ==
=== Artist(s) with multiple wins ===
The following artist(s) received two or more wins (excluding the special awards):

Awards	Artist(s)
2	BoA

=== Artist(s) with multiple nominations ===
The following artist(s) received two or more nominations:

Nominations	Artist(s)
3	BoA
2	Cho PD
2	RIch (리치)
2	Wheesung
2	Shinhwa
2	Sung Si-kyung
2	Kangta
2	Lee Soo-young
