= 2003 Mnet Music Video Festival =

- Date: November 27, 2003
- Location: Kyung Hee University, Seoul
- Hosted by: Cha Tae-hyun and Sung Yu-ri
- Most awards: Big Mama (2)
- Most nominations: Big Mama and Lee Hyori (3)
- Website: http://mama.interest.me

Television/radio coverage
- Network: South Korea: Mnet; Japan: Mnet Japan
- Runtime: around 203 minutes

The 2003 Mnet Music Video Festival (MMF) was the fifth of the annual music awards in Seoul, South Korea that took place on November 27, 2003, at the Kyung Hee University.

Leading the nominees were duo Big Mama and solo artist Lee Hyori, with three each. By the end of the ceremony, Big Mama were the only ones to receive two wins, including Music Video of the Year daesang award.

== Background ==
In its fifth year, the award-giving body continued to use the name "M.net Korean Music Festival" (MKMF) and the grand awards (or daesang) were still the Best Popular Music Video and Music Video of the Year. However, the event took place at the Kyung Hee University for the first time. Singer-actor Cha Tae-hyun came back to host the event for the third time, together with Sung Yu-ri.

During this year, the category for Best Indie Performance was discontinued.

== Selection process and judging criteria ==
During the preliminary screening, the committee selected the nominees who released their singles and albums from November 2002 to October 2003. Afterwards, the official website of Mnet was opened so that fans will be able to vote their for candidates. In the same way, the professional juries have chosen from the nominees as well. The votes from both the fans and the judges were combined for the winners of each category.

== Winners and nominees ==
Winners are listed first and highlighted in boldface.

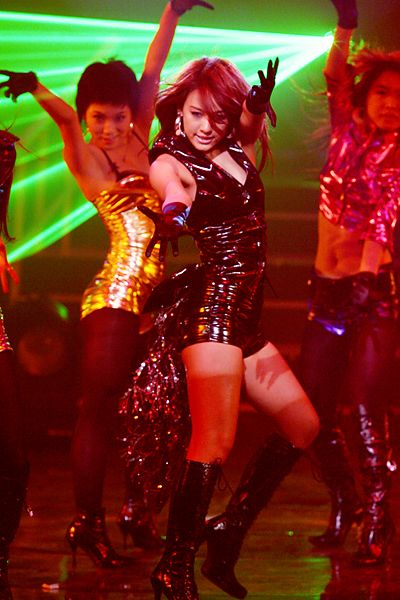
Lee Hyori, Most Popular Music Video

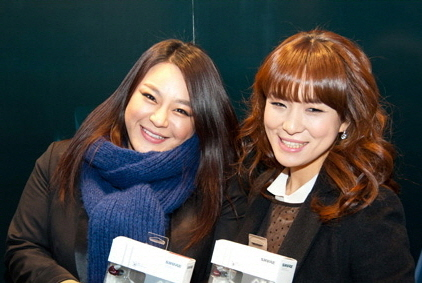
Big Mama, Best New Group and Music Video of the Year

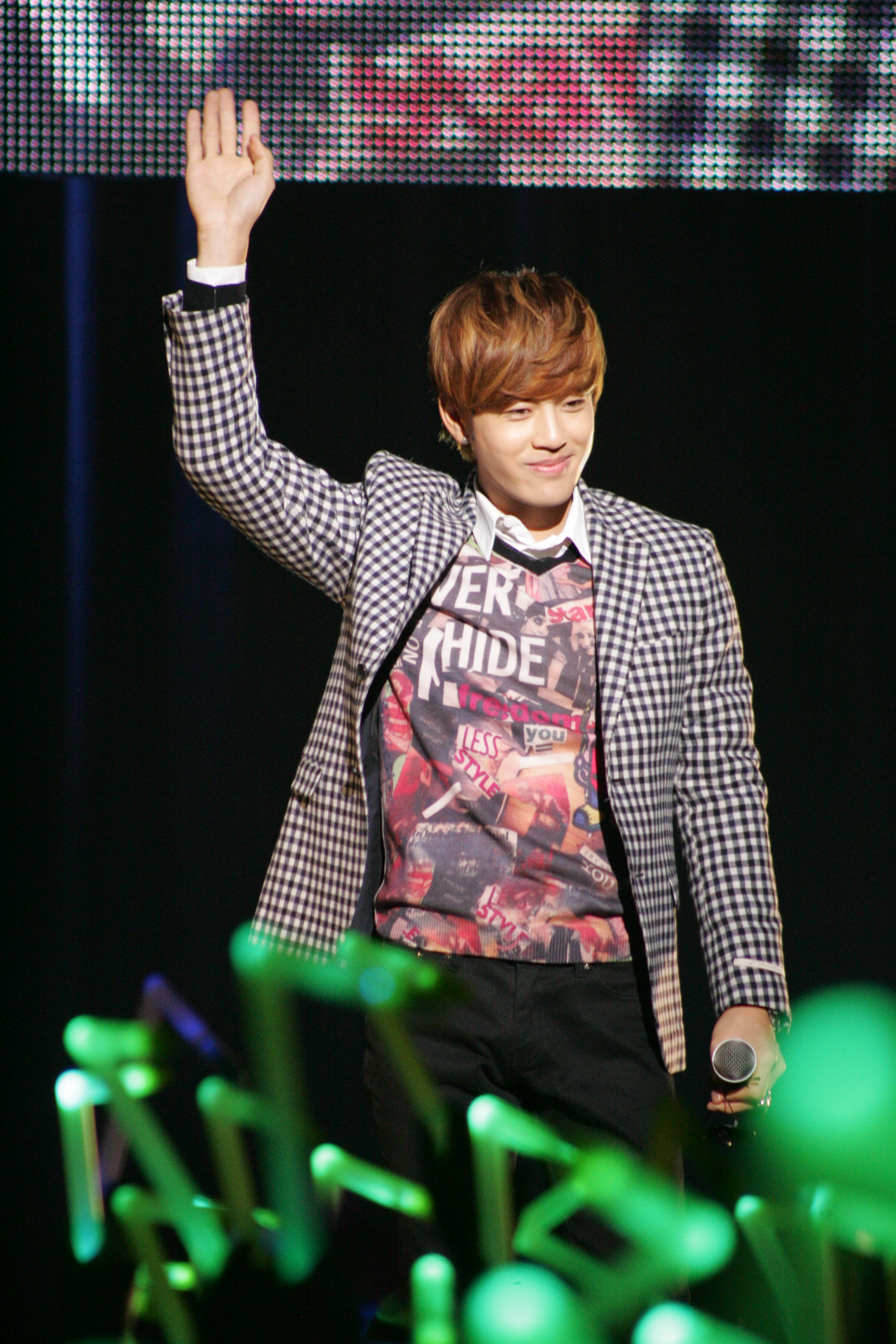
Seven, Best New Male Artist

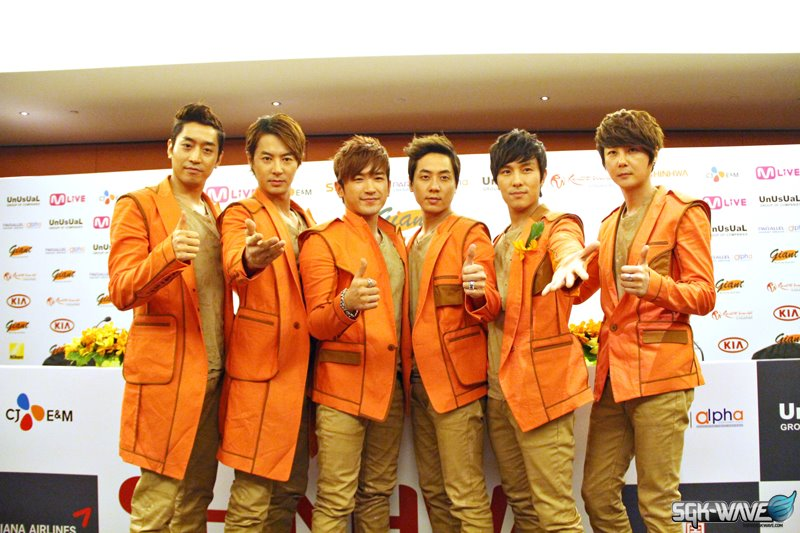
Shinhwa, Best Male Group and Netizen Popularity Award

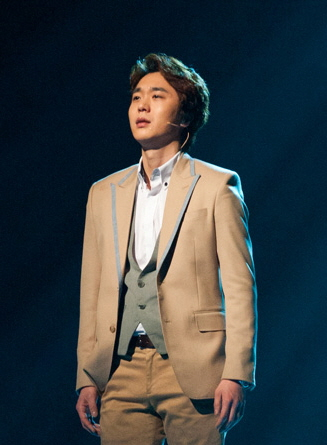
Jo Sungmo, Best Ballad Performance

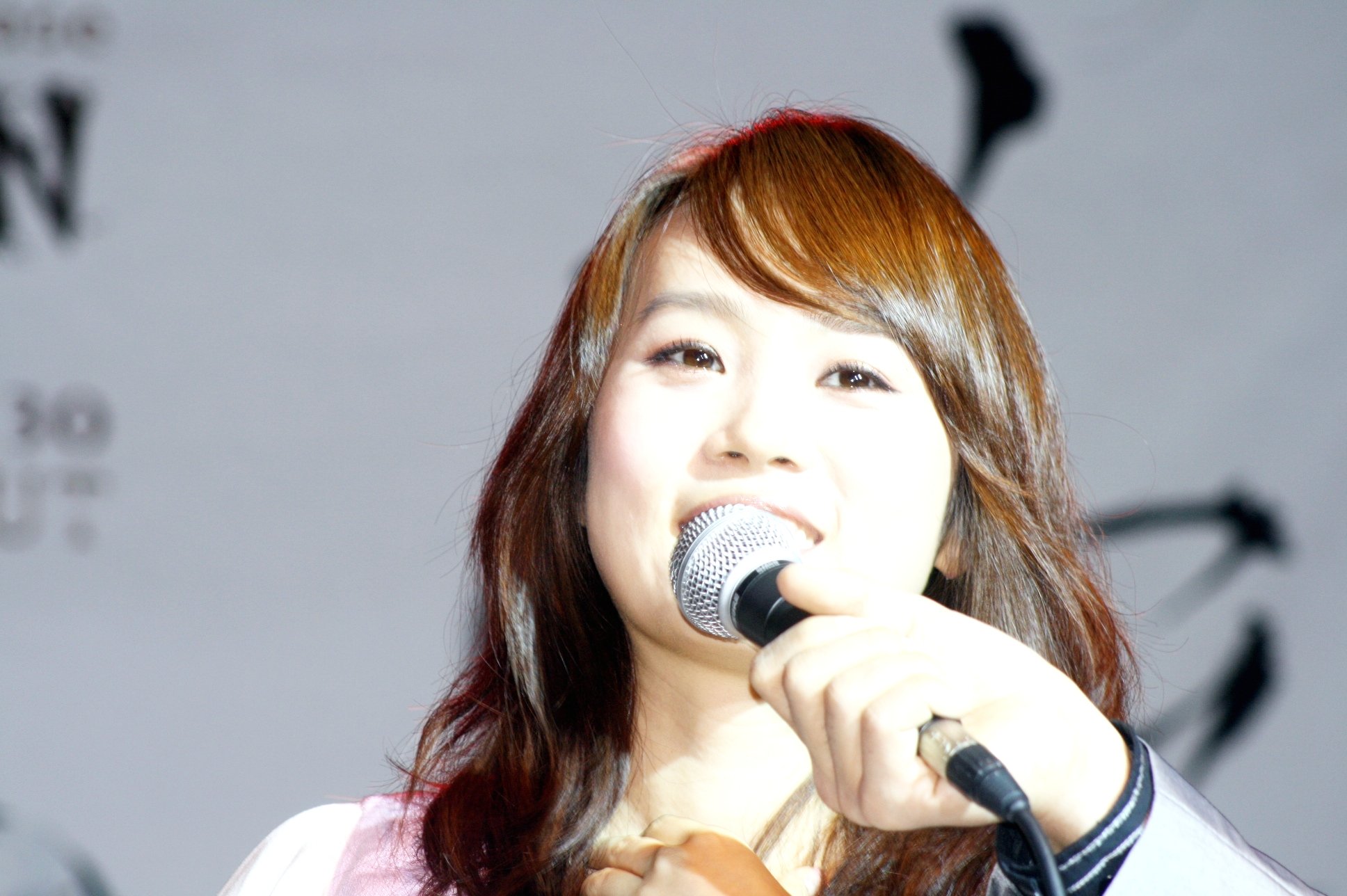
Lee Soo-young, Best Female Artist

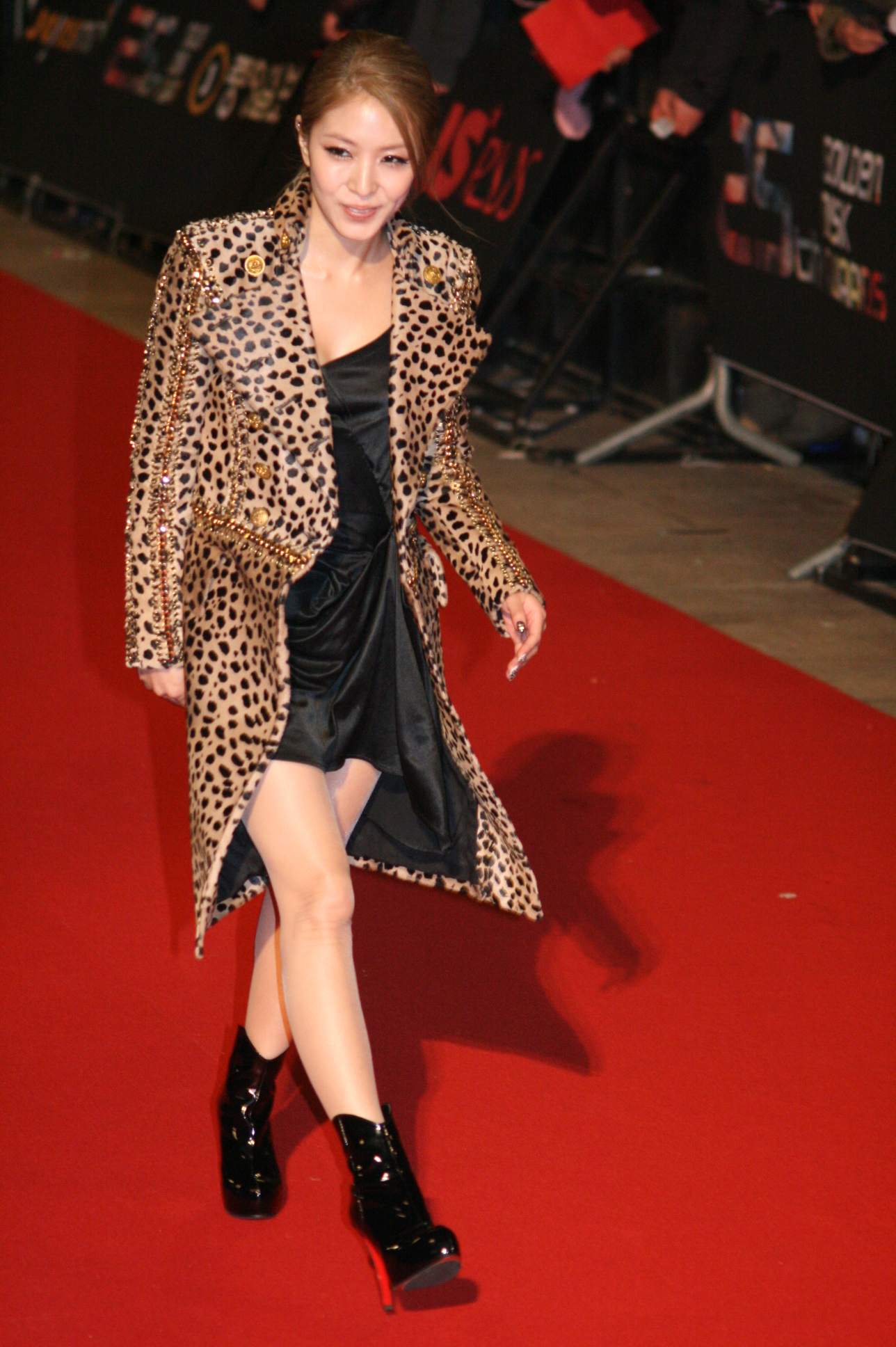
BoA, Most Popular Music Video and Best Dance Performance

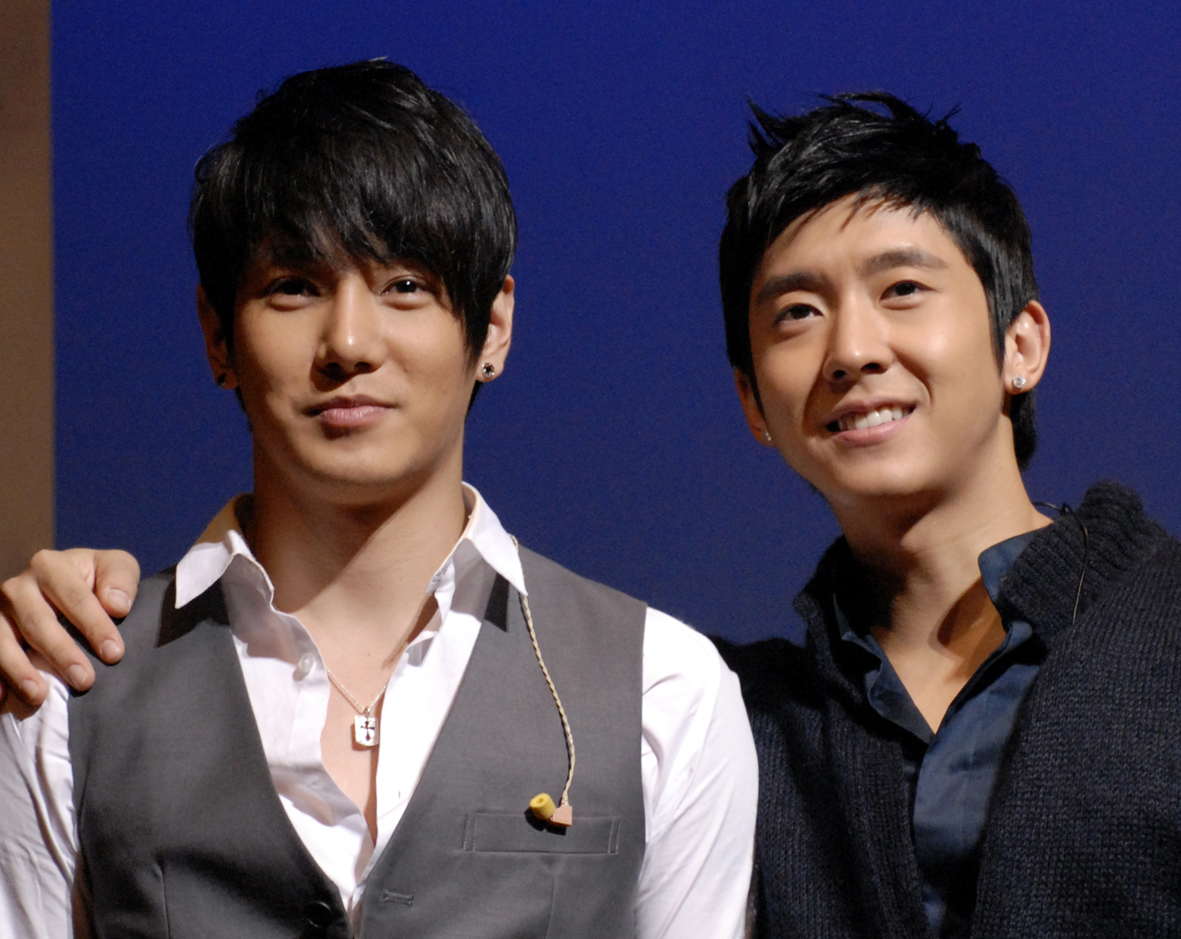
Fly to the Sky, Best R&B Performance

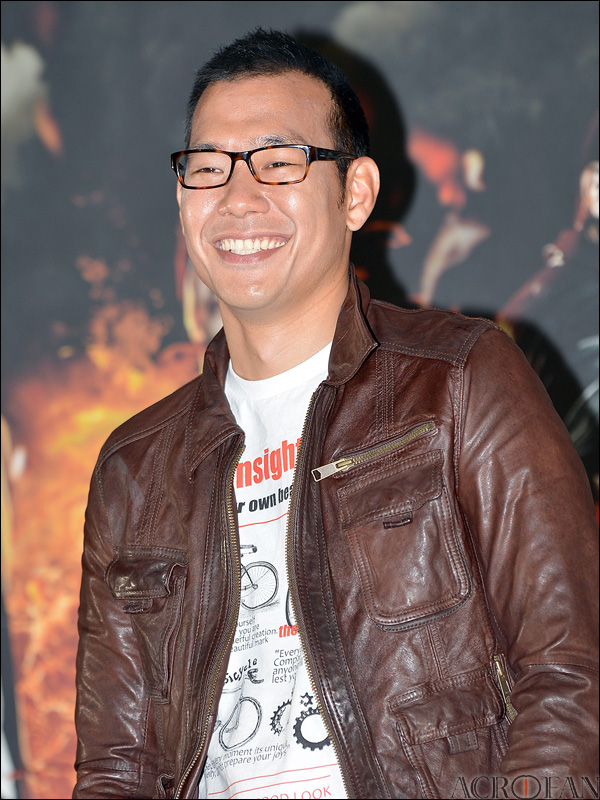
Kim Jin-pyo, Best Hip Hop Performance

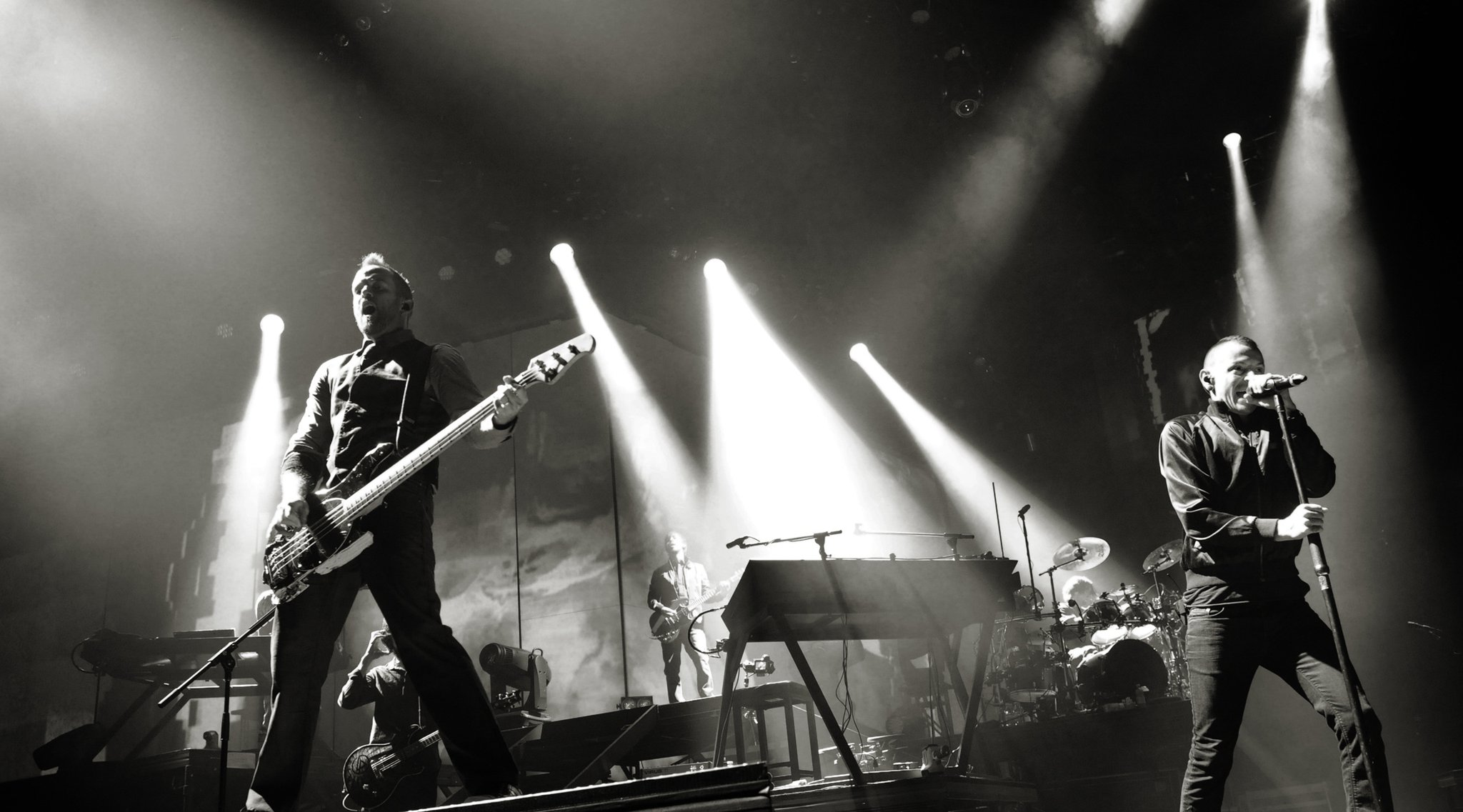
Linkin Park, Best International Artist

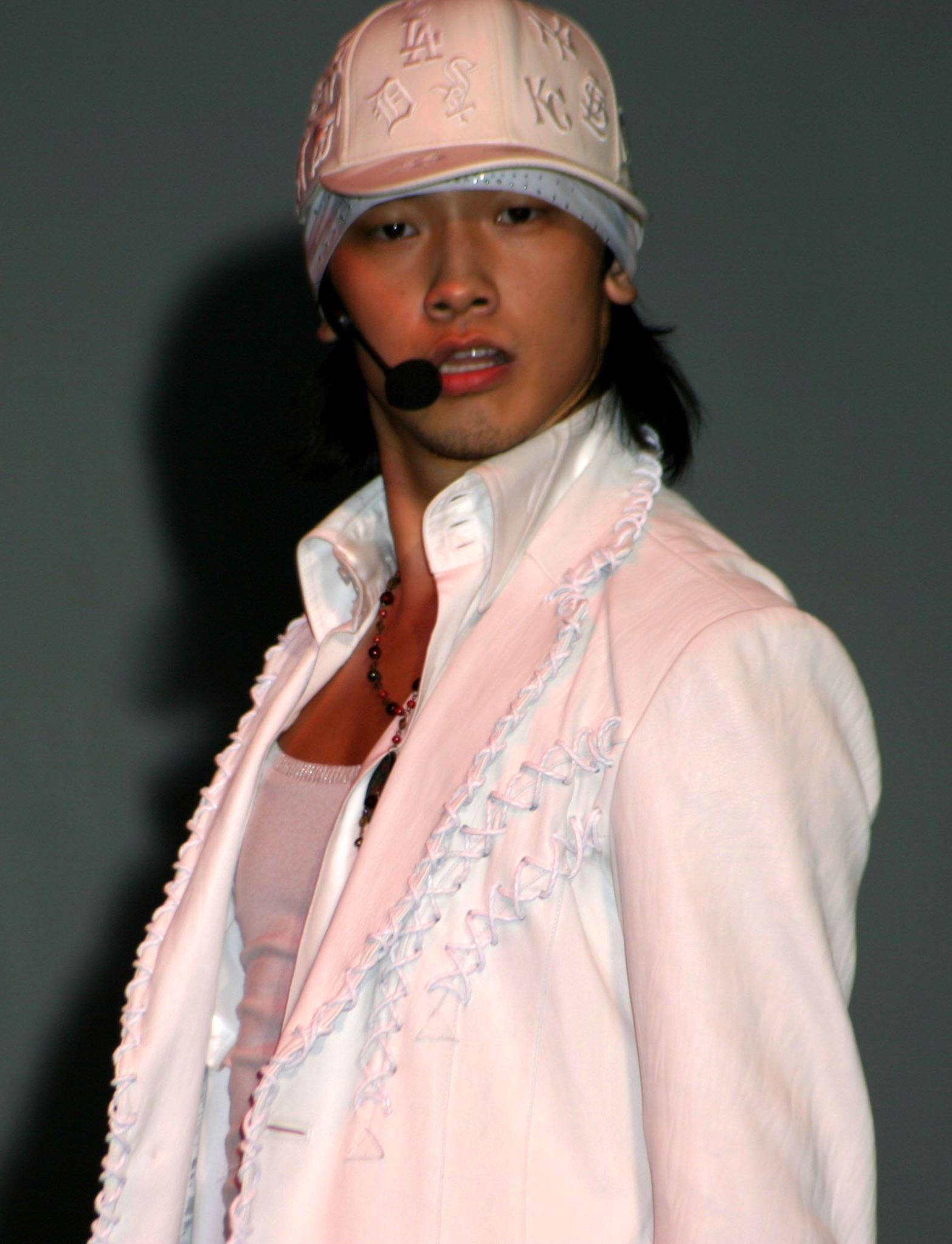
Rain, Mobile Popularity Award

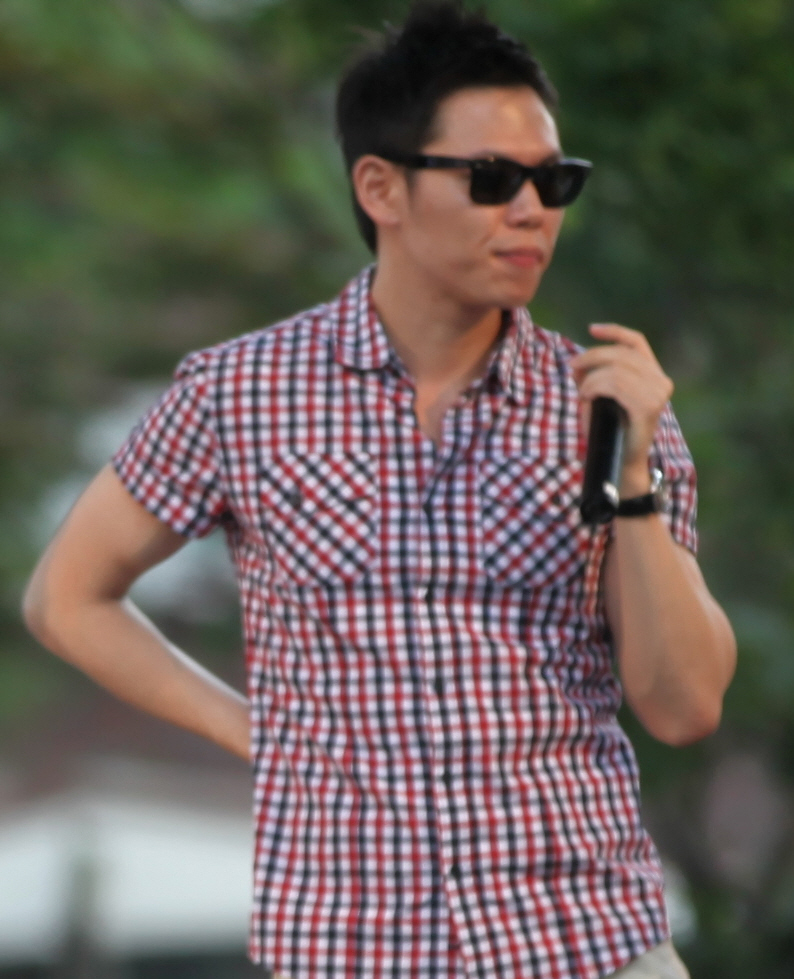
Jo PD, Special Jury Prize

| Most Popular Music Video (daesang) | Music Video of the Year (daesang) |
|---|---|
| **Lee Hyori – "10 Minutes"** | **Big Mama – "Break Away"** |
| Best New Male Artist | Best New Female Artist |
| **Seven – "Come Back to Me"**; Masta Wu – "Bad Boy"; Park Yong-ha – "Tidings"; Tim – "I Love You"; Lee Jung – "Never" | **Maya – "Azalea"**; Gummy – "If You Come Back"; Leeds – "You'll Be Happy"; Lexy – "Grasshopper"; Chae Yeon – "Dangerous Directing" |
| Best New Group | Best Mixed Group |
| **Big Mama – "Break Away"**; Noel – "If It's Love"; The Gold – "Two Years, Two Months"; 2SHAI – "Love Letter"; F-iV – "Girl" | **Koyote – "Emergency"**; Loveholics – "Loveholic"; The Jadu – "Gimbap"; Cherry Filter – "Flying Duck"; Cool – "If You Were Going To Get Married" |
| Best Male Group | Best Female Group |
| **Shinhwa – "Your Wedding"**; g.o.d – "Letter"; S – "I Swear"; N.R.G – "Hit Song"; jtL – "Without Your Love" | **Jewelry – "I Really Like You"**; Baby Vox – "What Should I Do"; Chakra – "To You"; Sugar – "Shine"; As One – "Mr.A-Jo" |
| Best Male Artist | Best Female Artist |
| **Wheesung – "With Me"**; Kim Gun-mo – "Wedding Invitation"; Rain – "How To Avoid The Sun"; Lee Juck – "I Didn't Know That Time"; Jo Sung-mo – "Piano" | **Lee Soo-young – "Solitary"**; Bada – "Music"; BoA – "Atlantis Princess"; Wax – "Relationship"; Lee Hyori – "10 Minutes" |
| Best R&B Performance | Best Rock Performance |
| **Fly To The Sky – "Missing You"**; Brown Eyed Soul – "I Love You"; Big Mama – "Break Away"; Seven – "Once Again"; Wheesung – "With Me" | **Cherry Filter – "Flying Duck"**; Butterfly Effect – "First Love"; Nell – "Stay"; Moon Hee-joon – "My Silent Conflict"; YB – "I'll Get Over You" |
| Best Hip Hop Performance | Best Music Video Director |
| **Kim Jin-pyo – "With a Dogged Spirit"**; Drunken Tiger – "Because I'm A Man"; Leessang – "Leessang Blues"; Eun Ji-won – "Drunken In Melody"; Cho PD – "Secret Diary" ) | **Jang Jae-hyuk** – "My Silent Conflict" (Moon Hee-joon) and "Flower" (Lee Seung-hwan); Seo Hyeon-seung; Park Yeong-jin; Lee Jun-hyeong; Hong Jong-ho |
| Best Dance Performance | Best Ballad Performance |
| **BoA – "Atlantis Princess"**; Kim Hyun-jung – "If This Is The End"; Shinhwa – "Your Wedding"; Lee Hyori – "10 Minutes"; jtL – "Without Your Love" | **Jo Sung-mo – "Piano"**; Kim Bum-soo – "I Miss You"; Ock Joo-hyun – "I"; Lee Soo-young – "Solitary"; Lee Seung-hwan – "Flower" |
Best International Artist
**Linkin Park – "Somewhere I Belong"**; Beyoncé – "Crazy in Love"; Gareth Gates – "Anyone of Us (Stupid Mistake)"; Stacie Orrico – "Stuck"; t.A.T.u. – "All the Things She Said"

Special awards

- Mobile Popularity Award: **Rain – "Ways To Avoid The Sun"**
- Special Jury Prize: **Cho PD – "Secret Diary" (비밀일기)**
- Netizen Popularity Award: **Shinhwa – "Your Wedding**

== Multiple awards ==
=== Artist(s) with multiple wins ===
The following artist(s) received two or more wins (excluding the special awards):

| Awards | Artist(s) |
|---|---|
| 2 | Big Mama |

=== Artist(s) with multiple nominations ===
The following artist(s) received two or more nominations:

| Nominations | Artist(s) |
|---|---|
| 3 | Lee Hyori |
| 3 | Big Mama |
| 2 | Seven |
| 2 | Cherry Filter |
| 2 | Shinhwa |
| 2 | jtL |
| 2 | Wheesung |
| 2 | Jo Sung-mo |
| 2 | Lee Soo-young |
| 2 | BoA |

== Performers and presenters ==
The following individuals and groups, listed in order of appearance, presented awards or performed musical numbers.

=== Performers ===
| Name(s) | Performed | Notes |
|---|---|---|
| DJ DOC | "Pozori", "Street Life", and "Run To You" | Opening of the show |
| Seven | "I Just Wanna Be", 와줘", | Best New Artist |
| Jo Sung-mo | "Piano", "Fly Me to the Moon", and "Can't Stop Loving You" | |
| Lee Hyori | "10 Minutes" | Middle of the show |
| M | "Sweet Girl" | Middle of the show |
| M ft. Lee Hyori | "Hey Girl" | Middle of the show |
| Wheesung | "Gone", "With Me" | "Mr.Real-Slow" |
| Wheesung and Seven | "Luz Control" | "Mr.Real-Slow" |
| Lexy | "Lose Control" | "Mr.Real-Slow" |
| Koo Jun-yup, Jeong Lee, Chae Yeon, Rain, Kang Won-rae (강원래) and Bada | "You're My Life", "Back To Top", "Escape", "I", "Thinking of My Brother" | "Born Again 2003" |
| Rain | "Do You Like That I'm Famous Now", "Ways To Avoid The Sun" | "He's Perfect!" |
| Asoto Union. Dynamic Duo, Eun Ji-won, Jung-in, Movement | "We Don't Stop", "Whistle", "Rush", "Because I'm A Man", "Love Rollercoaster" | "The Musician" |
| Crystal Kay | "Can't Be Stopped" | "Friends Over The Rainbow" |
| Bada | "A Day Of Renew" | "Friends Over The Rainbow" |
| Lee Hyori | "10 Minutes" encore | Closing remarks (Most Popular Music Video awardee) |

=== Presenters ===
| Name(s) | Role |
|---|---|
| Cha Tae-hyun and Sung Yu-ri | Main hosts of the show |
| Rain and Gong Hyo-jin | Presenters for the award for Best New Male Artist |
| Yeo Wook-hwan (여욱환) and Han Ji-min | Presenters for the award for Best New Female Artist |
| Lim Eun-kyung and Eun Ji-won | Presenters for the award for Best New Group |
| Jo Sung-mo and Park Jung-ah | Presenters for the award for Best International Artist |
| Kim Young-ho and Ahn Heung-chan (안흥찬) | Presenters for the award for Best Rock Performance |
| Uhm Jung-hwa and DJ DOC | Presenters for the award for Best Hip Hop Performance |
| Kim Jong-wan (김종완) and Chakra | Presenters for the special award for Mobile Popularity Award |
| Oh Seung-hwan and Yeon Jung-hoon | Presenters for the award for Best Male Group |
| Kwon Min-jung (권민중) and Lee Hyuk-jae | Presenters for the award for Best Female Group |
| Lee Mun-seok (이문석) and Kim Jun-hee (김준희) | Presenters for the award for Best Mixed Group |
| Kim Jung-man (김중만) and Kim Jung-hwa | Presenters for the award for Best Music Video Director |
| Myung Se-bin and 용이감독 | Presenters for the award for Special Jury Prize |
| Ahn Byeong-gyun (안병균) and Jang Shin-young | Presenters for the award for Netizen Popularity Award |
| Gong Hyung-jin and Song Seon-mi | Presenters for the award for Best Dance Performance |
| Ryu Soo-young and Cho Yun-heok (초윤헉) | Presenters for the award for Best Ballad Performance |
| Kim Nam-jeon (김남전) and Han Ji-hye | Presenters for the award for Best R&B Performance |
| Chae Shi-ra and Kim Tae-wook (김태욱) | Presenters for the award for Best Male Artist |
| Kang Ho-dong, Jo Jeong-rin (조정린), and Shin Dong-yup | Presenters for the award for Best Female Artist |
| Kim Sung-eun and Park Jeung-chum (박증츰) | Presenters for the award for Music Video of the Year |
| Han Chae-young and Lee Gang-mok (이강목) | Presenters for the award for Most Popular Music Video |
