= MAMA Awards in the Special Awards Category =

Special music award given by Mnet Asian

MAMA Awards in the Special Awards category
- Country: South Korea
- Presented by: CJ E&M Pictures (Mnet)
- Website: Mnet Asian Music Awards

The following are the Special Awards given by the MAMA Awards.

== Popularity/People's Choice Awards ==
Year^{[I]}	Winner(s)	Song
Mobile Popularity Awards
2002 (4th)	Jang Na-ra	"Sweet Dream"
2003 (5th)	Rain	"How to Avoid the Sun"
2004 (6th)	Gummy	"Memory Loss"
2005 (7th)	TVXQ	"Rising Sun"
2006 (8th)	TVXQ	"'O'-Jung.Ban.Hap."
2007 (9th)	Super Junior	"Don't Don"
2009 (11th)	Super Junior	"Sorry Sorry"
Netizen Popularity Awards
2002 (4th)	Moon Hee-joon	"Generous"
2003 (5th)	Shinhwa	"Your Wedding"
2005 (7th)	Moon Hee-joon	"A Small Village Called Memories"
2006 (8th)	Shinhwa	"Once in a Lifetime"
2007 (9th)	Super Junior	"Don't Don"
2008 (10th)	TVXQ	"Mirotic"
2009 (11th)	Super Junior	"Sorry Sorry"
Digital Popularity Awards
2005 (7th)	MC Mong	"Invincible"
2006 (8th)	SG Wannabe	"Partner for Life"
Overseas Viewers' Awards
2000 (2nd)	Click-B	"화영문"
2001 (3rd)	NRG	"Sorrow"
2004 (6th)	Shinhwa	"Brand New"
2005 (7th)	Kangta	"Mask"
2006 (8th)	Shinhwa	"Once In A Lifetime"
2007 (9th)	Shinhwa	"Once In A Lifetime"
2008 (10th)	TVXQ	"Mirotic"
2009 (11th)	Super Junior	"Sorry Sorry"
2011 (13th)	Super Junior	"Mr. Simple"
Others
2014 (16th)	Infinite (K-pop Fan's Choice - Male)	"Last Romeo"
2014 (16th)	Girls' Generation-TTS (K-pop Fan's Choice - Female)	"Holler"
2015 (17th)	EXO (Sina Weibo Global Fan's Choice - Male)	"Call Me Baby"
2015 (17th)	f(x) (Sina Weibo Global Fan's Choice - Female)	"4 Walls"
2017 (19th)	EXO (Mwave Global Fan's Choice)	"Ko Ko Bop"
2018 (20th)	BTS (Mwave Global Fan's Choice)	"Fake Love"

== Mnet PD's Choice/Judges' Choice ==
Year^{[I]}	Winner(s)	Song
Judges' Choice Awards
2000 (2nd)	Tae Jin-ah	"Love Is Not For Someone"
2001 (3rd)	No Brain	"Go To The Beach"
2002 (4th)	Shin Seung-hun	"If We Can Part Even Though We Love"
2003 (5th)	Jo PD	"Secret Diary"
2004 (6th)	Kim Yoon-ah	"Nocturne"
2005 (7th)	Jo PD	"My Old Story"
2008 (10th)	SG Wannabe	
Mnet PD's Choice Awards
2004 (6th)	Deux	-
2005 (7th)	S.E.S	-
2006 (8th)	TVXQ	-
2007 (9th)	F.T. Island	-
2008 (10th)	Shin Seung-hun	-
2011 (13th)	YB	-
2012 (14th)	B.A.P	-

== Professional/Technical-related Awards ==
Year^{[I]}	Category	Winner(s)	Work
2005 (7th)	Filming Award	Park Sung-il	"Splendor of Youth"
2005 (7th)	Editing Award	Song Geol	"It Must Have Been In Love"
2005 (7th)	Special Effects Award	FX NINE	"My Love Song"
2005 (7th)	Planning Award	Samsung Anycall	Anymotion commercial (with Lee Hyori and Eric Mun)
2006 (8th)	Composition Award	Jo Young Su (조영수)	"Partner for Life" (by SG Wannabe)
2006 (8th)	Lyrics Award	Ahn Young-min (안영민)	"Crazy Love Song" (by SeeYa)
2006 (8th)	Arrangement Award	Ryu Jae Hyun (류재현)	"The Man The Woman" (by Vibe)
2008 (10th)	Composer Award	Kim Jong-wan (Nell)	"기억을 걷는 시간"
2008 (10th)	Lyricist Award	Kim Dong-ryul	"Let's Start Again" ( Nell )
2008 (10th)	Arrangement Award	Tablo	"One" ( Epik High )
2009 (11th)	Best Asian Songwriter Award	Park Jin-young	"Nobody"
2009 (11th)	Lyricist Award	Park Seon-ju	"Love Him"
2009 (11th)	Composer Award	Teddy	"Fire" & " I Don't Care"
2009 (11th)	Arrangement Award	Shinsadong Tiger	"Muzik"
2010 (12th)	Choreographer Award	Kim Hwa-young	
2010 (12th)	Producer Award	Psy	"Cinderella"
2015 (17th)	Best Producer	(South Korea) Park Jin-young; (Vietnam) Phuc Bo; (China) Gao Xiaosong	—N/a
2015 (17th)	Best Engineer	(South Korea) Ko, Hyun-jong; (China) Lupo Groinig; (Japan) Yoshinori Nakayama	—N/a
2015 (17th)	Best Live Entertainment	(South Korea) In Jae-jin; (China) Wu Qun Da; (Thailand) Vit Suthitnavil	—N/a
2016 (18th)	Best Producer	(South Korea) Black Eyed Pilseung	—N/a
2016 (18th)	Best Visual & Art Director	(South Korea) Min Hee-jin	—N/a
2016 (18th)	Best Choreographer	(Thailand) J.Da Apissara Phetruengrong	—N/a
2016 (18th)	Best Promoter	(Japan) Masahiro Hikada	—N/a
2016 (18th)	Best Executive Producer	(South Korea) Bang Si Hyuk	—N/a
2016 (18th)	Best International Producer	(United States) Timbaland	—N/a
2016 (18th)	Best Engineer	(Japan) Tanaka Hironobu	—N/a
2017 (19th)	Best Producer of the Year	(South Korea) Pdogg	—N/a
2017 (19th)	Best Visual & Art Director of the Year	(South Korea) Yang	—N/a
2017 (19th)	Best Choreographer of the Year	(South Korea) Youngjun Choi	—N/a
2017 (19th)	Best Video Director of the Year	(Japan) Atsushi Makino	—N/a
2017 (19th)	Best Engineer of the Year	(Vietnam) Dat Nguyen Minh	—N/a
2017 (19th)	Best Executive of the Year	(United States) George Trivino	—N/a
2017 (19th)	Best Composer of the Year	(Indonesia) Raisa Andriana & Isyana Sarasvati	—N/a
2018 (20th)	Best Engineer of the Year	(Indonesia) LalellmaNino & Java Finger	—N/a
2018 (20th)	Best Composer of the Year	(South Korea) Deanfluenza (Dean)	—N/a
2018 (20th)	Best Producer of the Year	(South Korea) Pdogg	—N/a
2018 (20th)	Best Choreographer of the Year	(South Korea) Son Sung-deuk (BTS)	—N/a
2018 (20th)	Best Art Director of the Year	MU:E (BTS)	—N/a
2018 (20th)	Best Video Director of the Year	(Taiwan) Lo Ging-zim (aMEi)	—N/a
2018 (20th)	Best Executive Producer of the Year	(South Korea) Bang Si Hyuk	—N/a
2019 (21st)	Best Engineer of the Year	(South Korea) Kwon Nam Woo	—N/a
2019 (21st)	Best Composer of the Year	(South Korea) Pdogg	—N/a
2019 (21st)	Best Producer of the Year	(Taiwan) Starr Chen, Howe Chen, RAZOR	—N/a
2019 (21st)	Best Choreographer of the Year	(United Kingdom) Kiel Tutin	—N/a
2019 (21st)	Best Art Director of the Year	(Japan) Yuni Yoshida	—N/a
2019 (21st)	Best Video Director of the Year	(South Korea) Lumpens	—N/a
2019 (21st)	Best Executive Producer of the Year	(South Korea) Bang Si Hyuk	—N/a
2020 (22nd)	Best Engineer of the Year	(South Korea) Gu Jong Pil & Kwon Nam Woo	—N/a
2020 (22nd)	Best Composer of the Year	(Indonesia) Yovie Widianto	—N/a
2020 (22nd)	Best Producer of the Year	(South Korea) Pdogg	—N/a
2020 (22nd)	Best Choreographer of the Year	(Vietnam) Quang Dang	—N/a
2020 (22nd)	Best Art Director of the Year	(South Korea) MU:E	—N/a
2020 (22nd)	Best Video Director of the Year	(South Korea) Lumpens	—N/a
2020 (22nd)	Best Executive Producer of the Year	(South Korea) Bang Si Hyuk	—N/a

== Global awards ==
Year^{[I]}	Winner(s)	Song
Best Global Group
2012 (14th)	Super Junior (Male)	"Sexy, Free & Single"
2012 (14th)	Kara (Female)	"Pandora"
Next Generation Global Star
2013 (15th)	Apink	"NoNoNo"

== Performance Awards ==
Year^{[I]}	Category	Winner(s)
2005 (7th)	Best Video Performer Award	Psy
2009 (11th)	Best World Performance	Lady Gaga
2010 (12th)	Performance Award	Jisan Valley Rock Festival
2012 (14th)	Guardian Angel Worldwide Performer	Big Bang
2013 (15th)	Sony MDR World Wide Performer	Infinite
2013 (15th)	Best Concert Performer	Lee Seung-chul
2015 (17th)	World Performer	BTS
2016 (18th)	World Performer	Seventeen
2017 (19th)	Best Concert Performer	Monsta X
2017 (19th)	World Performer	Got7

== Style in Music ==
Year^{[I]}	Winner(s)
2011 (13th)	Seo In-young
2012 (14th)	Ga-in
2013 (15th)	Sistar
2014 (16th)	Jung Joon-young
2014 (16th)	EXO
2015 (17th)	EXO
2016 (18th)	EXO
2017 (19th)	Sunmi
2017 (19th)	EXO-CBX
2017 (19th)	BTS
2018 (20th)	Monsta X

== Discovery of the Year ==
Year^{[I]}	Winner(s)
2008 (10th)	Galaxy Express
2010 (12th)	10 cm
2013 (15th)	Baechigi
2017 (19th)	NU'EST W
2018 (20th)	Momoland
2020 (22nd)	Ateez

== Best of Next ==
Year	Category	Winner(s)
2016 (18th)	Best of Next Male Artist	Monsta X
2016 (18th)	Best of Next Female Artist	Blackpink
2017 (19th)	Best of Next	Wanna One
2017 (19th)	Best of Next	Kim Chung-ha
2018 (20th)	Best of Next	(G)I-dle
2020 (22nd)	Best of Next	Cravity
2026 (28th)	Best of Next	Rescene

== Others ==
Year^{[I]}	Category	Winner(s)
1999 (1st)	기획상	대한민국/전 리안 - 이채형
2001 (3rd)	Achievement Award	(South Korea) Clon
2002 (4th)	Music Video Pioneer Award	(South Korea) Lee Seung-hwan
2004 (6th)	Blue Award	(South Korea) Moon Hee-joon - "Paper Airplane"
2007 (9th)	MKMF Tribute Award	(South Korea) Insooni
2008 (10th)	10th Year Anniversary Remember Award	(South Korea) H.O.T
2008 (10th)	Music Portal Mnet Award	(South Korea) BIGBANG
2009 (11th)	Hall of Fame Award	(South Korea) Shim Soo-bong
2009 (11th)	Music Portal Mnet Award	(South Korea) 2NE1
2010 (12th)	Adult Music Award	(South Korea) Tae Jin-ah
2010 (12th)	Stylist Award	(South Korea) Yang Seung-ho
2012 (14th)	TVB Choice Award	(Hong Kong) Joey Yung
2012 (14th)	Best LINE Award	(South Korea) Super Junior
2013 (15th)	Red Carpet Special Prize	(South Korea) Lee Jung-hyun
2013 (15th)	Music Makes One Global Ambassador Award	(United States) Stevie Wonder
2014 (16th)	Favorite Music in China	(China) Chopstick Brothers - "Little Apple"
2014 (16th)	The Most Popular Vocalist	(South Korea) IU
2015 (17th)	Worldwide Inspiration Award	(England) Pet Shop Boys
2015 (17th)	iQiYi - Worldwide Favourite Artist	(South Korea) BIGBANG
2016 (18th)	Inspired Achievement	(United States) Quincy Jones
2016 (18th)	iQiYi - Worldwide Favourite Artist	(South Korea) GOT7
2017 (19th)	Inspired Achievement	(Japan) Yasushi Akimoto
2017 (19th)	Worldwide Favorite Artist	(South Korea) Seventeen
2018 (20th)	Inspiration Award	(United States) Janet Jackson
2018 (20th)	'DDP' Best Trend	(South Korea) Wanna One
2018 (20th)	'TikTok' Most Popular Artist	(South Korea) GOT7
2023 (25th)	Favorite International Artist	(Japan) Yoshiki
2024 (26th)	Favourite Global Trending Music	(South Korea) Byeon Woo-seok

== Notes ==
^{^[I]} Each year is linked to the article about the Mnet Asian Music Awards held that year.
