= The Jadu =

South Korean rock band

The Jadu (더 자두)
- Origin: South Korea
- Genres: Rock, pop
- Years active: 2001–2008
- Labels: Manine/ES
- Members: Jadu (자두); Maru (마루)
- Past members: Kang Doo (강두)

The Jadu (더 자두) was a South Korean modern rock band that performed from 2001 to 2008. "Jadu" means "Plum" in Korean. In 2002, Korea Now called The Jadu one of Korea's "most celebrated indie bands."

The band formed in 2001, initially comprising lead Jadu (자두) (real name Kim Deok Eun; 김덕은) and Kang Doo (강두) (real name Song Yong Shik; 송용식). Kang left the band in 2006 to pursue an acting career, and was replaced by Maru (마루).

== Awards ==
The Jadu won a Seoul Music Award for Best Newcomer in 2001; and the Mnet Asian Music Award for Best Coed Group in 2002.

== Discography ==
- Version 0001, released 2001-03-22
- Change Yourself, released 2002-04-02
- Jadu 3, released 2003-05-15
- Jadu 4, released 2005-05-03
- Happy Network, released 2008-04-24

== Awards ==
=== Mnet Asian Music Awards ===
Year	Category	Work	Result
2002	Best Mixed Group	"We Need To Talk" (대화가 필요해)	Won
2003	Best Mixed Group	"Gimbap" (김밥)	Nominated
2005	Best Mixed Group	"Let's Play" (놀자)	Nominated
