= MAMA Award for Best Mixed Group =

Music award category

Mnet Asian Music Award for Best Mixed Group
- Awarded for: Best mixed group of the year
- Country: South Korea
- Presented by: CJ E&M Pictures (Mnet)
- First award: 2000
- Final award: 2009
- Website: Mnet Asian Music Awards

The Mnet Asian Music Award for Best Mixed Group was an award presented annually by CJ E&M Pictures (Mnet) from 2000 to 2009.

It was first awarded on the 2nd Mnet Asian Music Awards ceremony held in 2000; S#arp won the award for their performance in "Great!", and it is given in honor for the mixed group with the most artistic achievement in the music industry. The award continued to be given until the 11th Mnet Asian Music Awards in 2009 wherein 8Eight received the last award for their performance in "Without a Heart".

== Winners and nominees ==
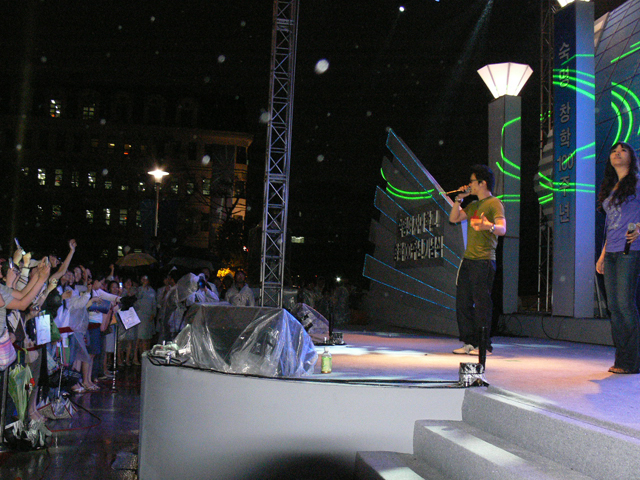
Clazziquai, (2007)

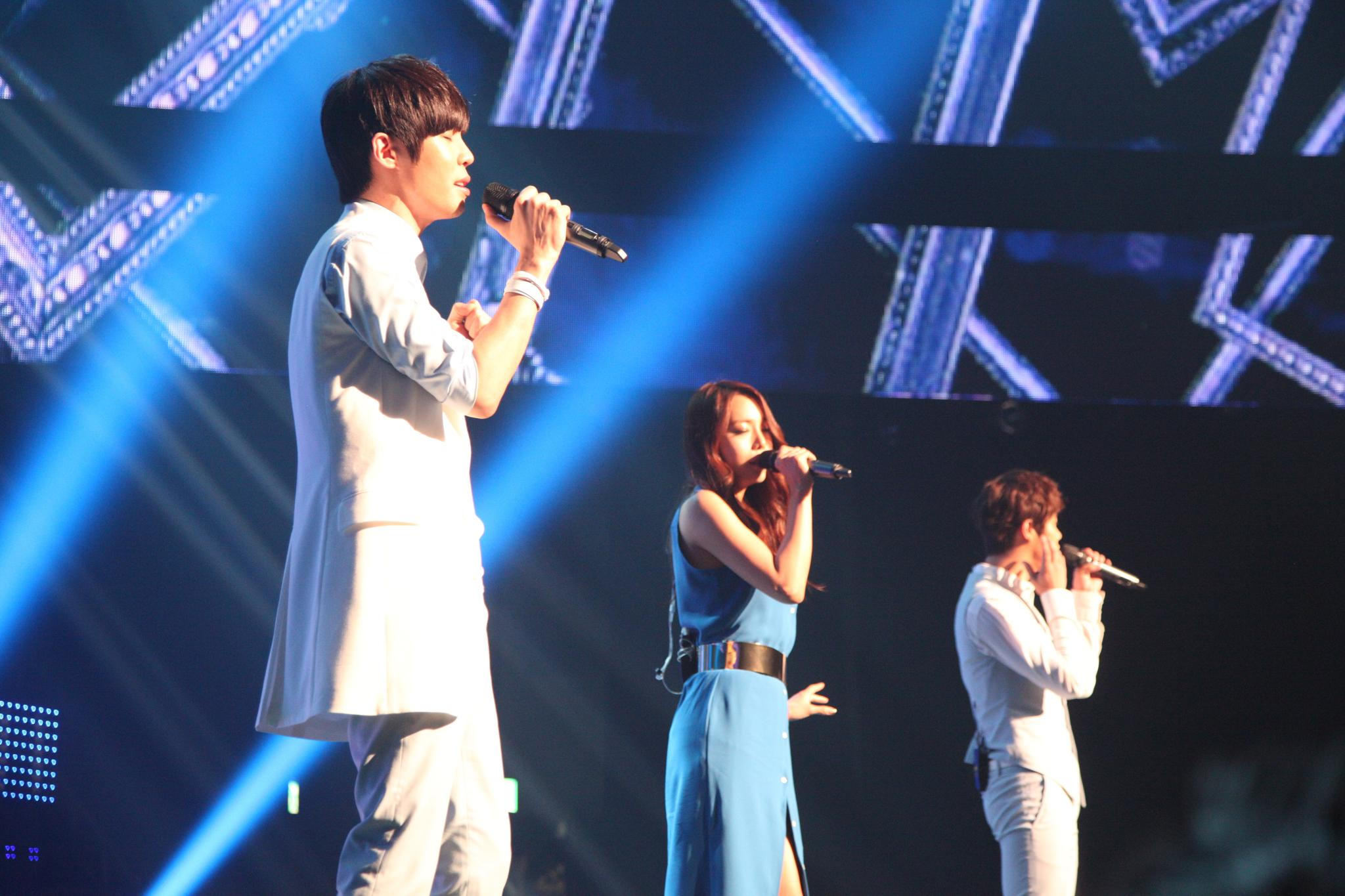
8Eight, (2009)

Year^{[I]}	Winner(s)	Song	Nominee(s)
2000 (2nd)	S#arp	"Great!"	Roo'ra - "A Changing Wind's Song" (풍변기곡); Space A - "Sexy Guy" (섹시한 남자); Koyote - "Passion"; Cool (쿨) - "Understanding Men and Women" (해석남녀)
2001 (3rd)	Koyote	"Paran"	Roo'ra - "Clear Away" (정리); S#arp - "100 Days Prayer" (백일기도); Space A - "Sexy Man" (바람난 남자); Cool - "Jumpo Mambo" (점포맘보)
2002 (4th)	The Jadu	"We Need to Talk"	S#arp - "Kiss Me" (내 입술..따뜻한 커피처럼); YTC - "Road" (길); Koyote - "Y"; Cool - "Truth" (쿨진실)
2003 (5th)	Koyote	"Emergency"	Loveholic - "Loveholic"; The Jadu - "Gimbap" (김밥); Cherry Filter - "Flying Duck"; Cool - "If You Were Going To Get Married"
2004 (6th)	Koyote (Note: Titled as "Best Group" award.)	"Disco King"	Turtles - "Come On"; Loveholic - "Sky"; Jaurim - "Hahaha Song" (하하하쏭); Cool - "Find A Friend" (친구찾기)
2005 (7th)	Koyote	"1, 2, 3, 4"	The Jadu - "Let's Play" (놀자); Rumble Fish - "Smile Again" (으라차차); Cool - "이여 름 Summer"; Clazziquai - "Fill This Night"
2006 (8th)	none		
2007 (9th)	Clazziquai	"Lover Boy"	Turtles - "It's Been A Long Time"; Rumble Fish - "Smile Again"; Cherry Filter - "Feel It"; Typhoon - "Only You"
2008 (10th)	none		
2009 (11th)	8Eight	"Without a Heart"	Roo'ra - "Going Going"; Koyote - "Nonsense" (넌센스); Cool - "Reporting Reporting" (보고보고); Clazziquai - "Love Again"

^{^[I]} Each year is linked to the article about the Mnet Asian Music Awards held that year.

== Multiple awards for Best Mixed Group ==
The following lists the artist(s) who received multiple awards for Best Mixed Group from 2000 to 2009.

Male artist	Record Set	First year awarded	Last year awarded
Koyote	4	2001	2005

== Notes ==
Sources
