= YB (band) =

South Korean rock band

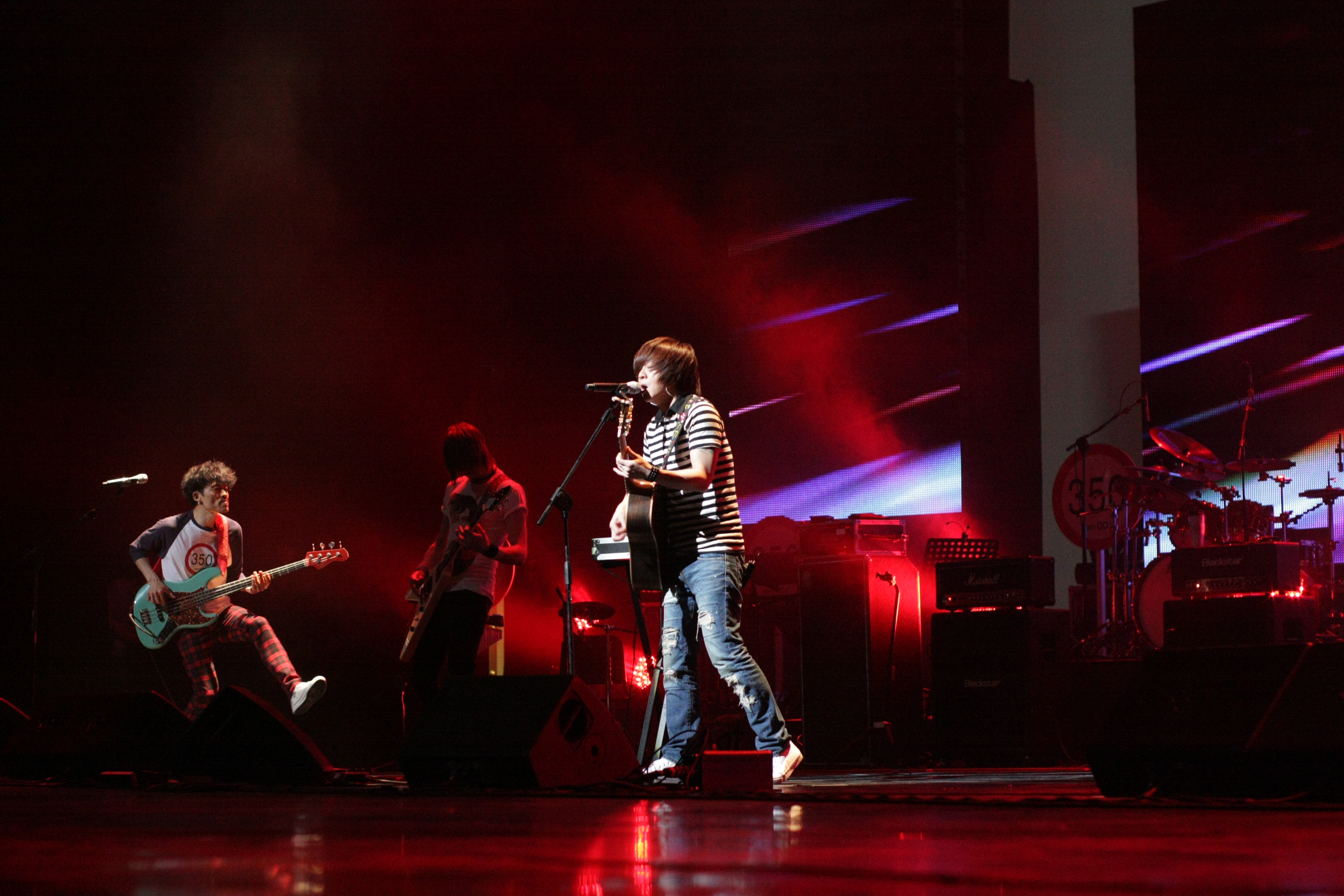

Background information
- Origin: South Korea
- Genres: Rock
- Years active: 1996–present
- Labels: DEE Company; Universal Music Group Korea
- Members: Yoon Do-hyun; Heo Jun; Kim Jin-won; Park Tae-hee
- Past members: Scott Hellowell
- Website: ybrock.com

YB, formerly known as Yoon Do-hyun Band (Korean: 윤도현밴드), is a South Korean rock band. Formed in 1996, the band consists of Yoon Do-hyun (lead vocals, keyboard, guitar), Heo Jun (guitar, keyboard), Kim Jin-won (drums), Park Tae-hee (bass guitar) and Scott Hellowell (guitar). YB rose to popularity during the 2002 World Cup, and once again in 2011 through appearing in the Korean TV show I Am a Singer. They have performed across the world and regularly headline major rock festivals in South Korea.

The band has released nine full-length studio albums and numerous other releases and live albums. Their music style is primarily influenced by classic rock with elements of modern rock, also combined with a contemporary Korean cultural identity. YB is widely known for their explosive and dynamic live performances, and a resonant directness in vocal style and songwriting. YB has won the "Best Music" award from Korea's three main broadcast stations KBS, MBC and SBS, and in 2011 won the "Mnet Specialized Award" at the Mnet Asian Music Awards.

== History ==
=== Formation ===
Yoon Do-hyun debuted as a solo artist with the album In Front of the Post Office in Autumn (가을 우체국 앞에서) in 1994, and following that formed the eponymously named Yoon Do-hyun Band in 1996, with himself on vocals, drummer Kim Jin-won, guitarist Yoo Byung-yeol, and bass guitarist Park Tae-hee. Later that year, Yoon played the lead role in Jungle Story, Kim Hong-joon's film that recounts the rise and fall of a fictitious, underground band. His bandmates also appeared in the film.

The initial lack of success led to Yoon Do-hyun Band almost disbanding in 2000, and guitarist Yoo Byung-yeol left the band and was replaced by Heo Jun.

=== Other successes (2003–2011) ===
YB won the WPMA (World Peace Music Award) in 2003 for their activities in 2002 promoting human rights, and through a concert in North Korea called "Oh Unification Korea". This is the first time a rock band has performed officially in North Korea.

Following YB's rise to being the foremost rock band in Korea, Yoon Do-hyun began to host TV shows such as Yoon Do-hyun's Love Letter (2002-2008) and grow as a celebrity in Korean media. In 2007, YB performed at the SXSW music festival held in Austin Texas, being the first Korean band to do so. YB continued to release various albums and tour extensively within Korea. In 2005 they were the first Korean band to tour Europe, returning to a crowded Trafalgar Square in London in 2008.

In 2009 they embarked on the Warped Tour in the USA. Following a friendship developed from 2005, YB began to include Scott Hellowell from England as a special guest guitarist for concerts in the summer and eventually winter, (2008-2010). This relationship progressed into the band inviting him to become a full-time official band member in 2011. His official induction to the band was later televised in Yoon Do-hyun's MUST music TV show.

=== Continued popularity (2011–present) ===
In 2011, YB joined a cast of seven artists who provided the original line up for MBC's I Am a Singer, a TV show which proved to be a cultural phenomenon in Korea and across Asia that year winning many awards. This led to YB's second wave of huge success, at the same time the show also instated Yoon Do-hyun as its host. As a result of a second rise to major popularity, YB performed in several overseas concerts including China, Japan and America.

YB are regular headliners at many of the biggest Korean rock festivals such as Pentaport and Busan International Rock Festival. YB performed in Pyongyang on April 1, 2018. They contributed a cover of the Metallica song "Sad But True" to the charity tribute album The Metallica Blacklist, released in September 2021.

On September 19, 2024, it was announced that Scott Hellowell would leave the group in October.

== Discography ==
=== Studio albums ===
Title	Album details	Peak chart positions		Sales
Title	Album details	KOR MIAK	KOR Circle	Sales
In Front of the Post Office in Autumn (가을 우체국 앞에서) (released as Yoon Do-hyun solo album)	Released: December 1994; Label: Daeum Entertainment; Format: CD, cassette	—N/a	—N/a	
Yoon Do-hyun 2	Released: March 1997; Label: Daeum Entertainment; Format: CD, cassette	—N/a	—N/a	
Alienation (소외)	Released: June 19, 1998; Label: Daeum Entertainment; Format: CD, cassette	32	—N/a	KOR: 21,365
An Urbanite	Released: June 28, 2001; Label: Daeum Entertainment; Format: CD, cassette	12	—N/a	KOR: 128,579
[YB] Stream	Released: July 24, 2003; Label: Daeum Entertainment; Format: CD, cassette	—	—N/a	
Why Be?	Released: August 10, 2006; Label: Daeum Entertainment; Format: CD, cassette	4	—N/a	KOR: 22,206
Coexistence (공존)	Released: March 24, 2009; Label: Daeum Entertainment; Format: CD, download	—N/a	—N/a	
Reel Impulse	Released: June 25, 2013; Label: Dee Company; Format: CD, download	—N/a	15	KOR: 3,190
Twilight State	Released: October 10, 2019; Label: Dee Company; Format: CD, download	—N/a	44	KOR: 1,553

=== Extended plays ===
Title	EP details	Peak chart positions	Sales
Title	EP details	KOR Circle	Sales
Blue Whale (흰수염고래)	Released: November 24, 2011; Label: Daeum Entertainment; Format: CD, download	20	KOR: 1,687
Remind	Released: October 26, 2016; Label: Daeum Entertainment; Format: CD, download	—	
2018 YB Live in Pyongyang	Released: April 24, 2018; Label: Daeum Entertainment; Format: Download, streaming	—	

=== Live albums ===
- Yoon Do-hyun Band (2000)
- Live Is Life (2002)
- After 10 Years (2007)
- I Bow (2010)

=== Singles ===
- "Nation Anthem (애국가)"
- "2006 World-Cup Cheer Song"
- "Han Ban Do O.S.T - 1178"
- "Tell Me"
- "Taxi Driver O.S.T - SILENCE"

== Awards ==
=== Mnet Asian Music Awards ===
Year	Category	Work	Result
2002	Best Rock Performance	"Love Two"	Won
2003	Best Rock Performance	"I'll Get Over You" (잊을께)	Nominated
2005	Best Male Artist	"It Must Have Been Love" (사랑했나봐)	Nominated
2006	Best Music Video	"Today" (오늘은)	Nominated
2006	Best Rock Performance	"Today" (오늘은)	Nominated
2011	Mnet Specialized Award	—N/a	Won
