= Turtles (South Korean band) =

South Korean hip-hop group

- Origin: South Korea
- Genres: Hip hop
- Years active: 2001–2008; 2011
- Labels: Enter One Music
- Past members: Turtleman; Z-E; Geum Bi; SuBin; Lee Kang

- Turtles
- Hangul: 거북이
- RR: Geobugi
- MR: Kŏbugi

Turtles (Korean: 거북이) was a South Korean hip-hop group which debuted in 2001. The single "Airplane" (bihaengi) from their fourth album topped the KBS chart in September 2006.

The lead singer and rapper of the group, "Turtleman" (born Lim Sung-hoon), died of a heart attack on April 2, 2008; he was found by his manager at his apartment.

On September 4, 2008, the remaining members (Geum Bi and Z-E) announced their official disbandment. On April 2, 2011, the group released "Aigoo", a posthumous single found on Turtleman's computer. On April 18, 2011, they announced they would be returning on April 28, with a new male vocalist and single titled "Protagonist".

== Members ==
- Turtleman (터틀맨, rap and vocals, 2001–2008; his death)
- Z-E (지이, rap and vocals) (2001–2008)
- Geum Bi (금비, vocals) (2001–2008)
- Su Bin (수빈, vocals, 2001)
- Lee Kang (이강, rap and vocals, 2011)

== Discography ==
=== Albums ===
1. Go! Boogie!, 2001
2. Turtles 2, 2003
3. Turtles 3, 2004
4. Buy Turtles, 2006
5. 오방간다 (OhBangGanDa), 2008

=== Singles ===
1. Turtles: Digital Single – Christmas Mix, 2006
2. Turtles: 4.5 – Remake Single, 2007
3. Turtles: Digital Single – 분홍빛 크리스마스, 2007
4. 아이고 (Aigoo), 2011
5. 주인공 (protagonist), 2011

=== Compilations ===
1. Turtles Best, The Land of Turtles, 2006
2. Turtles Special Album, The Unfinished Story, August 14, 2008

== Awards ==
=== Mnet Asian Music Awards ===
| Year | Category | Work | Result |
|---|---|---|---|
| 2002 | Best New Group | "4 Seasons" (사계) | Nominated |
| 2004 | Best Group Video | "Come On" | Nominated |
| 2006 | Best Dance Performance | "Airplane" | Nominated |
| 2007 | Best Mixed Group | "It's Been A Long Time" | Nominated |
