= The Sea (UP song) =

1997 song by UP

Single by UP

from the album Second Birth
- Language: Korean
- Released: April 18, 1997
- Genre: Dance-pop
- Length: 3:46
- Label: Luce Entertainment
- Composer: Jang Yong-jin
- Lyricist: Jang Yong-jin

UP singles chronology
"Ppuyo Ppuyo" (1997)	"The Sea" (1997)	"I Love You" (1997)

"The Sea" (Korean: 바다; RR: Bada) is a song recorded by South Korean co-ed group UP. It was released as the second single from their second studio album Second Birth by Luce Entertainment on April 18, 1997.

== Composition ==
"The Sea" was written and composed by Jang Yong-jin. Musically, it has been described as a dance-pop summer song with addictive melodies and lyrics.

== Commercial performance ==
Despite not receiving any music show award, "The Sea" had been second in line for the award several times on various music shows. "The Sea", along with "Ppuyo Ppuyo" (뿌요뿌요), another single released from the same album, greatly elevated UP's popularity.

== Credits and personnel ==
- UP – vocals
- Jang Yong-jin – lyrics, composition

== Koyote version ==
"The Sea"

Single by Koyote
- Released: July 19, 2020
- Length: 3:17
- Label: KYT Entertainment
- Composers: Jang Yong-jin; Kim Seong-tae
- Lyricists: Jang Yong-jin; Bbaek Ga

Koyote singles chronology
"Hit & Hit" (2020)	"The Sea" (2020)	"AhHa (Oh My Summer)" (2020)

=== Background and release ===
In 2020, on the May 9 episode of comedian Yoo Jae-suk's variety show Hangout with Yoo, Yoo announced plans to form a summer pop group, reminiscence of the 90s. In the episode, he discussed with various legacy singers on the prominence of co-ed groups in the 90s and its decline since then, and had the idea of forming a co-ed dance group. The group, SSAK3, was formally established later that month with members Lee Hyo-ri and Rain, both of whom debuted in the 90s. The presence of Lee and Rain in the group, two of the largest artists of their time, and the group's nostalgic concept, led to a "retro-craze" trend.

Following this trend, the co-ed group Koyote released the dance trot song "Hit & Hit" on June 19, their first release in sixteen months. This was followed-up by the release of a remake of "The Sea" on July 19, further boosting the trend.

=== Track listing ===
- Digital download/streaming
1. "The Sea" – 3:17
2. "The Sea" (instrumental) – 3:17

=== Credits and personnel ===
- Koyote – vocals
- Jang Yong-jin – lyrics, composition
- Bbaek Ga – lyrics
- Kim Seong-tae – arrangement

=== Charts ===
Chart performance for "The Sea" (Koyote version)
Chart (2020)	Peak position
South Korea (Gaon)	102
South Korea (K-pop Hot 100)	47

== Zerobaseone version ==
"The Sea"
- Promotional poster

Song by Zerobaseone

from the EP Cinema Paradise
- Released: August 26, 2024
- Length: 2:40
- Label: WakeOne
- Composers: Jang Yong-jin; El Capitxn; Revin; Vendors (Lois)
- Lyricist: Jang Yong-jin

=== Background and release ===
On July 29, 2024, South Korean boy group Zerobaseone announced their fourth extended play (EP) Cinema Paradise, scheduled for an August release. On August 9, through the release of a motion graphic poster, a remake of "The Sea" was announced as the third track of the EP. The song was released with the EP on August 26.

=== Credits and personnel ===
- Zerobaseone – vocals
- Jang Yong-jin – lyrics, composition
- El Capitxn – arrangement
- Revin – arrangement
- Vendors (Lois) – arrangement

=== Charts ===
Chart performance for "The Sea" (Zerobaseone version)
Chart (2024)	Peak position
South Korea Download (Circle)	8

== Release history ==
Release history for "The Sea"
Region	Date	Format	Artist	Label
Various	April 18, 1997	—N/a	UP	Luce
Various	July 19, 2020	Digital download; streaming	Koyote	KYT
Various	August 26, 2024	Digital download; streaming	Zerobaseone	WakeOne
