= Cherry Filter =

South Korean rock band

Cherry Filter 체리필터
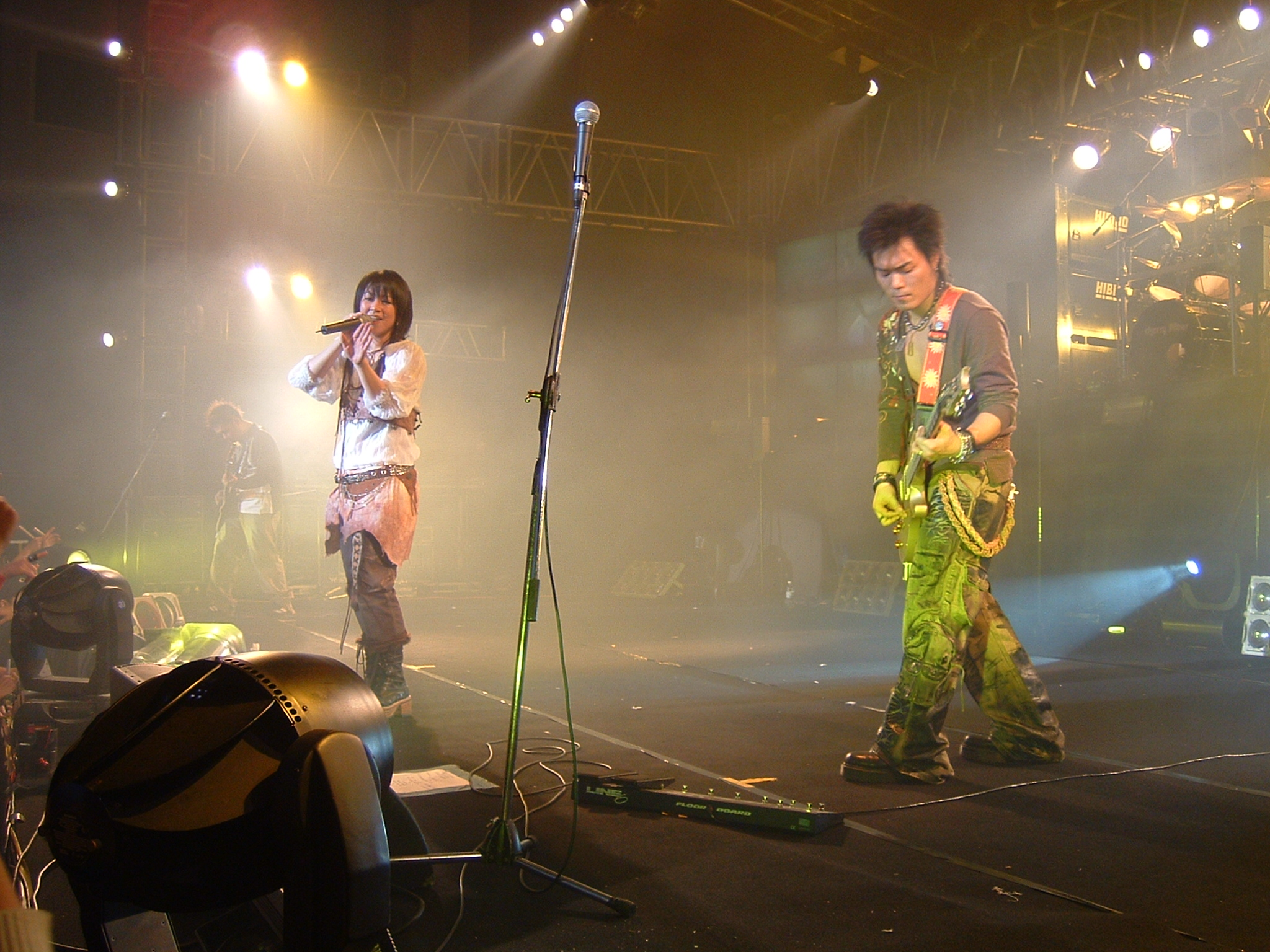

Background information
- Origin: South Korea
- Genre: Alternative rock
- Years active: 1997-present
- Label: Music Farm
- Members: Jijonbo; Yaenhead; Sonstar; Cho Youjeen
- Website: Official Site

Cherry Filter (체리 필터) is a South Korean rock band formed in 1997. Their unique sound - consisting of emotional ballads, punk rock, rave and trance - prevalent in their last two albums has given them fame across South Korea. The song "낭만 고양이" (Nangman Goyang-i, "Romantic Cat") from the album Made In Korea made Cherry Filter famous.

When Cherry Filter was first formed, everyone was curious about the meaning of the name "Cherry Filter". Youjeen stated in an interview, she wanted a name that expressed both femininity and masculinity, a filter representing masculinity and the cherry representing femininity. The band includes Cho Youjeen as the vocalist - who branched off into a solo career for 2 years in Japan, then returned to Cherry Filter - Jojinbo on guitar, Yaenhead on bass, and Sonstar on drums.

== Current members ==
Jung Woo-jin (born April 20, 1976) is the leader and the guitarist of the group. Yungeun (born September 21, 1976) plays the bass. Sonstar (born January 13, 1977) plays the drums and raps in several songs. Youjeen (born July 5, 1977) is Cherry Filter's vocalist.

=== Youjeen ===
In 2001, Youjeen temporarily left Cherry Filter to pursue a solo career in Japan, where she released music with the help of Luna Sea member J and former Foo Fighters guitarist Franz Stahl. She released five singles and two albums over the course of two years. After the release of her second Japanese album BEWITCH, through Teichiku Records, Youjeen ceased activities in the Japanese music scene. She is still active in South Korea as part of Cherry Filter.

In 2022, Youjeen featured on the single "Wild Flower" by RM of BTS, and earned her first entry on a Billboard chart when it debuted at number 83 on the Hot 100 in the United States.

== Discography ==
=== Studio albums ===
- 1 - April 14, 2000: Volume 1 - HEAD-UP
- 2 - August 13, 2002: Volume 2 - Made in Korea
- 3 - September 3, 2003: Volume 3 - The Third Eye
- 4 - July 7, 2006: Volume 4 - Peace 'N' Rock 'N' Roll
- 5 - September 17, 2007: Rewind (Remake cover album)
- 6 - August 27, 2009: Volume 5 - Rock steric

=== Singles ===
- May 24, 2004: Digital single- 너는 나를 지나쳐 (You Passed Me By)
- August 1, 2008: Digital single- Orange Road
- July 7, 2010: Digital single- WM7
- May 11, 2014: Digital single - Andromeda

=== o.s.t ===
- march 10, 2015~ January 6, 2016 : Tobot Op go tobot

=== Indie ===
- 1998 A Pirate Radio [V.A]
- 1999 Open the Door [V.A]

== Awards and nominations ==
Award	Year	Category	Nominated work / nominee	Result	Ref.
Golden Disc Awards	2003	Popularity Award	Cherry Filter	Won	
KBS Music Awards	2003	Singer of the Year	Cherry Filter	Won	
Mnet Asian Music Awards	2003	Best Mixed Group	"Flying Duck"	Nominated	
Mnet Asian Music Awards	2003	Best Rock Performance	"Flying Duck"	Won	
Mnet Asian Music Awards	2006	Best Rock Performance	"Happy Day"	Nominated	
Mnet Asian Music Awards	2007	Best Rock Performance	"Feel It"	Won	
Mnet Asian Music Awards	2007	Best Mixed Group	"Feel It"	Nominated	
MTV Video Music Awards Japan	2008	BuzzAsia from Korea	"Feel It"	Won	
SBS Gayo Daejeon	2002	Rock Award	Cherry Filter	Won	
SBS Gayo Daejeon	2003	Rock Award	Cherry Filter	Won	
Seoul Music Awards	2002	Rock Award	Cherry Filter	Won	
