= Koyote =

South Korean co-ed group

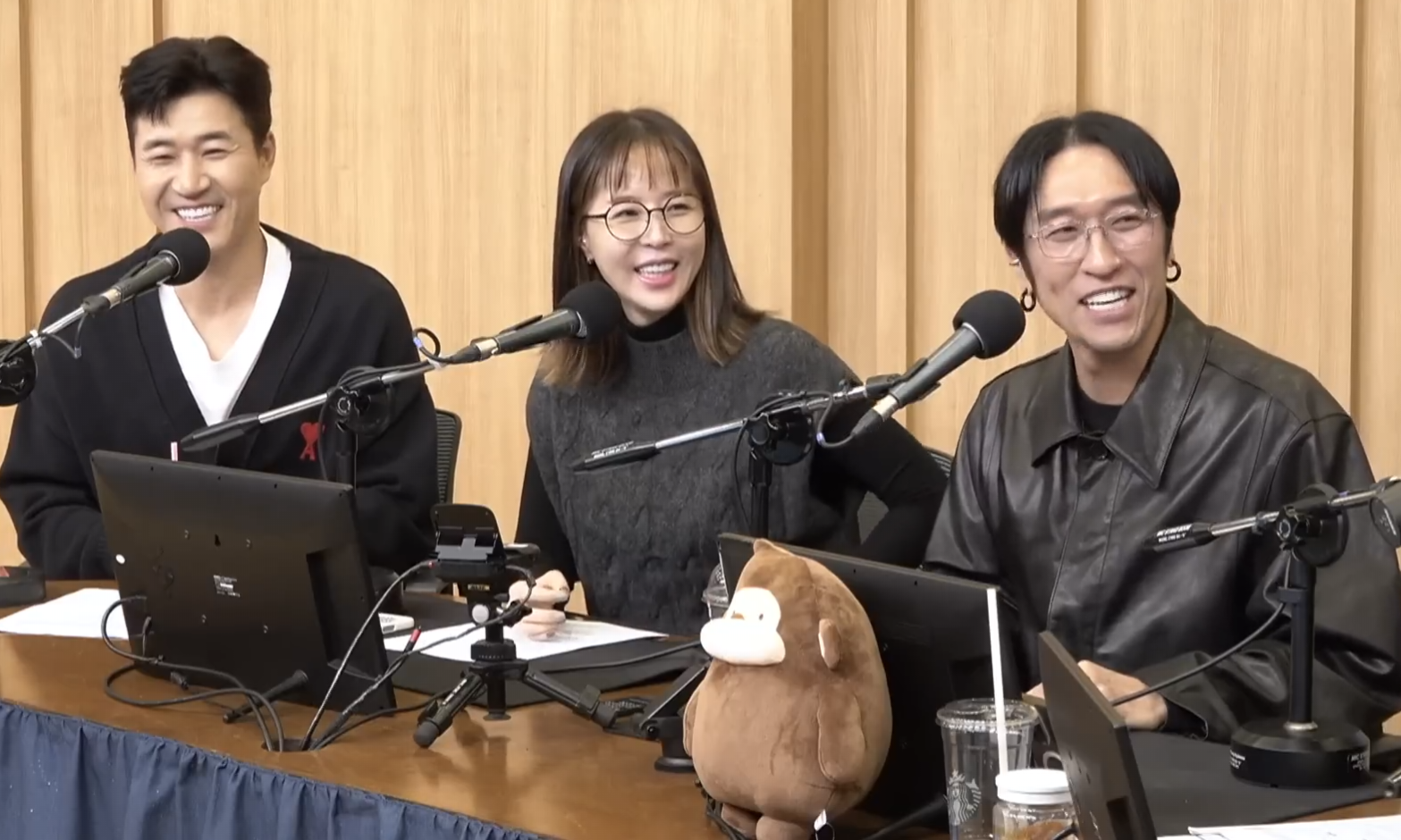
- Koyote in November 2024; L–R: Kim Jong-min, Shin Ji and Bbaek Ga.

Background information
- Also known as: Koyotae; KYT
- Origin: South Korea
- Genres: K-pop; dance; hip hop
- Years active: 1998–present
- Labels: Trifecta Entertainment; Yuri Entertainment; KYT Entertainment; J-G Star
- Members: Kim Jong-min; Shin Ji; Bbaek Ga
- Past members: Cha Seung-min; Kim Goo; Kim Young-wan; Jung Myung-hoon
- Website: http://kytent.co.kr

Koyote (Korean: 코요태; Hanja: 高耀太; RR: Koyotae), also known as KYT, is a South Korean co-ed vocal group consisting of members Kim Jong-min, Shin Ji, and Bbaek Ga. The group, which is known for its signature dance and hip hop sound, debuted in 1998 with hit song "Genuine".

Since its debut, Koyote has released ten studio albums, three extended plays, and numerous singles. The group has won several major awards including five Bonsangs at the Golden Disc Awards, four awards for Best Mixed Group at the Mnet Asian Music Awards, and the Grand Prize at the 2005 KBS Music Awards.

The group has gone through numerous line-up changes over the years, and Shin Ji is the group's only remaining original member.

== History ==
Cha Seung-Min, along with Shin Ji, and Kim Goo, formed Koyote as a 3-member Co-ed group.

=== 1999–2002: Departure of Cha Seung-min, arrest of Kim Goo, and new line-up changes ===
Koyote's first album, "고요태(高耀太)", received positive reviews among its release, and they instantly became well known for their song "Pure Love." They also promoted "Meeting", which was a remake of Im Ki-Hoon's 1995 song, in later 1999. They released their second album, "실연" (also the same name with their title track) in October 1999. Their title track reached up to first place nominee on various music programs, but was blocked off by Steve Yoo. Right after their promotions for "미련" ended, Cha Seung-min left the group to "focus on his studies". The truth is that he was the son of their company's CEO, X-PLUS Media. As he had arguments constantly with his father, he was forced to leave and Koyote eventually had no agency, and were on the verge of disbandment. Composer Joo Young-hoon eventually knew their situation and helped them find a new agency. In November 2000, their song "Passion" became a hit, with their popularity beginning to rise up even further. As Cha Seung-min left the group, Kim Jong-min replaced him as a temporary serve vocalist. They promoted "Disturbance" in January 2001, with various remixes. The song eventually rose up to first place nominee on Music Bank and consecutively won for 2 weeks. They also promoted "Pride" for a week. Right after their promotions ended, Kim Jong-min left the group. He returned in October and became a regular member. In 2002, Kim Goo was arrested during the shooting of one of their videos due to drug use, and was replaced by Kim Young-wan.

=== 2004–present: Bbaek Ga's surgery, Enlistment of Kim Jong-min, and Departure of Jung Myung-hoon ===
In 2004, Jung Myung-hoon left the group to fulfill his mandatory military service, and was replaced by Bbaek Ga. They released Feel Up Doeda, which won the South Korean Daesang for best artist. In 2007, they went on hiatus due to Kim Jong-min and Bbaek Ga needing to fulfill their military services. They returned with 2 members, Kim Jong-min and Shin Ji, with Bbaek Ga being absent due to a brain tumor. They released their 10th studio album Jumpin, with their lead Single "Return". Between 2010 and 2011, Koyote began to release EPs. Their EPs garnered mixed reviews, with Koyote beginning to release non album singles prior to the reviews. In 2015, their single "Stop love" Peaked at number 99 on the Gaon Chart, making that their first single to appear on the chart. Between 2016 and 2018, they hinted at a possible album in 2019, with 2 songs recorded in 2018. After, they went on hiatus until 2019, when their album "Reborn" was released.

== Members ==
=== Current members ===
- Kim Jong-min (김종민) joined in 2000
- Shin Ji (신지) original member
- Bbaek Ga (빽가) joined in 2004

=== Former members ===
- Cha Seung-min (차승민) – left in 2000
- Kim Goo (김구) – kicked out in 2002
- Kim Young-wan (김영완) – temporary rapper in 2002
- Jung Myung-hoon (정명훈) – temporary rapper in 2003

== Discography ==
=== Studio albums ===
Title	Album details	Peak chart positions		Sales	Track listing
Title	Album details	KOR MIAK	KOR Circle	Sales	Track listing
고요태 (高耀太)	Released: January 13, 1999; Label: Doremi Records; Format: CD, cassette, digital download	14	N/A	KOR: 171,197	Track list: 1. Prologue; 2. 순정 (Pure Love); 3. 금지된 사랑 (Forbidden Love); 4. 만남 (Meeting); 5. 약속 (Promise); 6. 편지 (Letter); 7. 그래 (Okay); 8. 기억해 줘 (Please Remember); 9. 내 사랑 전할 수 있다면 (If I Could Send My Love); 10. 순정 (Remix – Miami Version) (Pure Love); 11. 순정 (Instrumental Version) (Pure Love)
실연	Released: November 6, 1999; Label: Doremi Records; Format: CD, cassette, digital download	7	N/A	KOR: 167,304	Track list: 1. Party Party; 2. Touch Me; 3. 실연 (Broken Heart); 4. 미련 (Regret); 5. 가 (Go); 6. 끝없는 사랑 (Endless Love); 7. 옛사랑 (Old Love); 8. 바다의 품에 (In the Ocean's Embrace); 9. Cinema; 10. 유혹 (Temptation); 11. 해진 이 거리 (The Road After Sundown); 12. Party Party (instrumental)
Passion	Released: November 2, 2000; Label: Yedang Entertainment, Daeyoung AV; Format: CD, cassette, digital download	—	N/A	KOR: 486,539	Track list: 1. Rendez Vous; 2. 자존심 (Pride); 3. Passion; 4. Dear My...; 5. 파란 (Disturbance); 6. 변심 (Change); 7. Blue; 8. 약속 (Promise); 9. Happy Birthday; 10. 열정 (Enthusiasm); 11. Passion (Bonus Track Version)
필립 (必立)	Released: March 15, 2002; Label: Yedang Entertainment; Format: CD, cassette, digital download	3	N/A	KOR: 513,244	Track list: 1. 프로필 (Profile); 2. 비몽 (Sad Dream); 3. 애련 (Pity); 4. 운명 (Destiny); 5. Over; 6. Y 7. 데미지 (Damage); 8. Happy Song; 9. 아리랑 목동 (Arirang Mokdong); 10. 웃자 (Let's Smile); 11. Loving You; 12. 환희 (Remake) (Joy); 13. 매듭 (Knot); 14. Over (Remix Version)
비상 (非常)	Released: May 22, 2003; Label: Daeyoung AV, A&G Modes; Format: CD, cassette, digital download	2	N/A	KOR: 293,546	Track list: 1. 남남 (Stranger); 2. 무심 (Inadvertence); 3. 비상 (Emergency); 4. 가 (Go); 5. 애원 (Appeal); 6. Stop; 7. 놀자 (Let's Play); 8. 애심 (Beloving); 9. 슬퍼지는 하루 (Saddening Day); 10. Day; 11. 단념 (Abandonment); 12. All The Time; 13. 체념 (Resignation); 14. 일년반 (One Year And A Half)
Koyote 6	Released: March 26, 2004; Label: HI Entertainment; Format: CD, cassette, digital download	1	N/A	KOR: 295,029	Track list: 1. Line; 2. 불꽃 (Spark); 3. 디스코왕 (Disco King); 4. Drive; 5. Time; 6. Never; 7. Unforgettable; 8. 영웅 (Hero); 9. 어떤남자 (Some Man); 10. Together; 11. 단장 (Heartbreak); 12. 질주 (Dash); 13. 그날 이후 (After That Day); 14. Moon Night; 15. 악담 (Curse); 16. 후애 (After Love); 17. Non-Stop Mix (청바지아가씨, STORM, 이제는)
Rainbow	Released: November 28, 2004; Label: Trifecta Entertainment; Format: CD, cassette, digital download	4	N/A	KOR: 117,732	Track list: 1. Lover; 2. 느리게 걷기 (Walking Slowly); 3. 하얀 동화 (White Fairy Tale); 4. 사랑해요 (I Love You); 5. 빙고 (Bingo); 6. Rush; 7. Hey Shy Boy; 8. 해피 바이러스 (Happy Virus); 9. 이탈 (Break Away); 10. 바보 (Babo); 11. 사랑은 커피향 처럼 (Love is like the Scent of Coffee); 12. 비밀 (Secret); 13. 연습 (Practice); 14. 아자!아자! (2005 YM version) (Aja! Aja!); 15. 캐롤 메들리 Carol Medley (Rudolph Reindeer + Feliz Navidad + White Love)
Feel Up (되다 必(필)UP)	Released: August 30, 2005; Re-released: December 20, 2005; Label: Trifecta Entertainment; Format: CD, cassette, digital download	5	N/A	KOR: 79,396	Track list: 1. Like This; 2. 비는.... 하늘의 눈물 (Rain is.... The Heaven's Tears); 3. 1,2,3,4.; 4. 믿어볼까? (Should I Trust?); 5. 사랑병 (Lovesickness); 6. 상상 (Imagination); 7. 꽁깍지 (Blinded); 8. 버려 (Throw Away); 9. 아파도 (Even If It Hurts); 10. 허리케인 (Hurricane); 11. Tonight; 12. 모르겠어 (I Don't Know); 13. 기억하니 (Do You Remember); 14. Boy Is Mine; 15. 경고 (Caution); 16. Special Angel (생일 축하); Repackage: 1. 하얀 동화 (White Fairy Tale); 2. Rocking Around The Christmas Tree; 3. 1,2,3,4.; 4. 파란 (Disturbance); 5. 비몽 (Sad Dream); 6. Like This; 7. 경고 (Caution); 8. Boy Is Mine; 9. 믿어볼까? (Should I Trust?); 10. 디스코왕 (Disco King)
London Koyote	Released: September 18, 2006; Label: Trifecta Entertainment; Format: CD, cassette, digital download	5	N/A	KOR: 34,383	Track list: 1. I Love Rock & Roll; 2. Play; 3. Sweet; 4. 그 사람은 (That Person); 5. Big Smile; 6. Circle (Donggeurami); 7. 사랑은 변하니 (Does Love Change); 8. 말하지 못한 이야기 (Untold Story); 9. 벽 (Wall); 10. 사랑할수 없어 (I Can't Love); 11. 봐 (Look); 12. 어떤날 (Certain Day); 13. 세레나데 (Serenade); 14. Love...ing; 15. 눈먼사랑 (Blind Love); 16. 기쁨모드 (Happy Mode)
Jumping	Released: May 28, 2009; Label: Trifecta Entertainment; Format: CD, digital download	N/A	N/A		Track list: 1. Intro; 2. 아! 정말; 3. 넌센스(Nonsense); 4. 더!; 5. 정말 나쁜 남자야; 6. 아프고 아파도; 7. GO GO; 8. 너만이; 9. 이브의 경고 (Remake); 10. I’m Sorry (Feat. Woo Jae of Typhoon)
Reborn	Released: February 8, 2019; Label: KYT Entertainment; Format: CD, digital download	N/A	32		Track list: 1. THRILLER; 2. SAD NIGHT; 3. FACT; 4. Genuine; 5. Sad Dream; 6. Entreaty; 7. Meeting; 8. Broken Heart; 9. Our Dream; 10. THRILLER (Instrumental); 11. SAD NIGHT (Instrumental); 12. FACT(Instrumental)

=== Compilation albums ===
Title	Album details	Peak chart positions	Sales	Track listing
Title	Album details	KOR MIAK	Sales	Track listing
History	Released: October 30, 2001; Label: Youngwon Entertainment; Format: CD, digital download	28	KOR: 55,476	Track list Disc 1 – CD: 1. Passion; 2. 순정 (Soon Jung); 3. 만남 (Man Nam); 4. 금지된 사랑 (Geumjiden sarang); 5. 실연 (Shil Yun); 6. 파란 (Paran); 7. 가 (Ga); 8. Cinema; 9. Party Party; 10. Letter; 11. 미련 (Miryon); 12. 유혹 (Yuhog); 13. But; 14. Touch Me; 15. 끝없는 사랑 (Keuteobnun Sarang); 16. 약속 (Yagsog); 17. 순정 (Remix – Miami Version) (Soon Jung); 18. 실연 (Shil Yun); 19. 금지된 사랑 (Geumjiden sarang); Disc 2 – CD (Remix): 1. Letter; 2. But; 3. 순정 (Soon Jung); 4. 만남 (Man Nam); 5. 가 (Ga); 6. 미련 (Miryon); 7. Party Party; 8. 끝없는 사랑 (Keuteobnun Sarang); 9. Touch Me; 10. 파란 (Paran); 11. Cinema; 12. Passion; 13. 실연 (Shil Yun); 14. 유혹 (Yuhog)
The Koyote in Ballad Special: Best Album 2000–2005	Released: March 28, 2006; Label: EMI; Format: CD+DVD, cassette, digital download	10	KOR: 12,398	Track list Disc 1 – CD: 1. 그날이후 (Geunal Ihu); 2. 애원 (Aewon); 3. Y 4. 아파도 (Apado); 5. 사랑해요 (Saranghaeyo); 6. 상상 (Sangsang); 7. 연습 (Yeonseub); 8. Drive; 9. 비는..하늘의 눈물 (Bineun.. Haneure Nunmul); 10. 슬퍼지는 하루 (Sulpuhjinun Haru); 11. Loving You; 12. 기억하니 (Giyeokhani); 13. 후애 (Huae); 14. All The Time; 15. 약속 (Yagsok); 16. 해피 바이러스 (Happy Virus); 17. Dear My; Disc 2 – DVD: 1. 그날이후 (Geunal Ihu); 2. Y 3. 아파도 (Apado); 4. 상상 (Sangsang); 5. 논스톱 (Nonstop)
Dance Best and 9.5	Released: October 11, 2007; Label: Trifecta Entertainment; Format: CD+DVD, digital download	7	KOR: 19,482	Track list CD 1: 1. 사랑공식 (Love Formula); 2. 사랑과 전쟁; 3. 패션; 4. 파란; 5. 열정; 6. 비몽; 7. 애련; 8. 비상; 9. 디스코왕 (Disco King); 10. Together; 11. 불꽃; 12. 빙고; 13. 하얀동화; 14. 느리게 걷기; 15. Like this 16. 1.2.3.4; 17. I Love Rock & Roll; CD 2: 1. Intro; 2. 경고; 3. Moon Night; 4. Time; 5. 믿어볼까?; 6. Lover; 7. 이탈; 8. 허리케인; 9. 동그라미; 10. 기쁨모드; 11. 일년반; 12. 세레나데; 13. Day; 14. 벽 15. Rendez Vous; 16. 사랑이 변하니; 17. 영웅; 18. 남남; 19. Line; 20. 아자!아자!; 21. Unforgettable; 22. Over; 23. 운명; 24. 변심; 25. Stop; 26. Blue; 27. 질주; 28. 놀자; 29. 환희; 30. 애심; 31. 사랑병; 32. Happy Song; 33. 체념; 34. 캐롤메들리 루돌프 사슴코 (Carol Medley: Rudolph the Red Nosed Reindeer); 35. 캐롤메들리 Feliznavidad (Carol Medley: Feliz Navidad); 36. 캐롤메들리 스키장에서; 37. 청바지아가씨; 38. Storm; 39. 이제는; 40. Big Smile

=== Remix albums ===
Title	Album details	Track listing
Koyotae Best Mix	Released: August 31, 2000; Label: Garam Media; Format: CD, digital download	Track list: 1. 실연 (Shil Yun); 2. 미련 (Miryun); 3. 순정 (Soon Jung); 4. 만남 (Man Nam); 5. Party Party; 6. Cinema; 7. 유혹 (Yuhok); 8. 가 (Ga); 9. Touch Me; 10. 금지된 사랑 (Geumjiden sarang); 11. 편지 (Pyunji); 12. 끝없는 사랑 (Keuteobneun sarang); 13. 실연 (Techno Non-Stop Mix); 14. 만남 (Techno Non-Stop Mix); 15. Hot Sugar-Klub Kings (Techno Non-Stop Mix); 16. Headcheck-Nick Skitz (Techno Non-Stop Mix); 17. Cinema (Techno Non-Stop Mix); 18. U Got It-Alex K (Techno Non-Stop Mix); 19. 가 (Techno Non-Stop Mix); 20. 미련 (Techno Non-Stop Mix); 21. Miss America-Nick Skitz (Techno Non-Stop Mix); 22. Party Party (Techno Non-Stop Mix); 23. Lala-London Fiesta (Techno Non-Stop Mix); 24. 순정 (Techno Non-Stop Mix); 25. Pussywhipped-Alex K (Techno Non-Stop Mix)

=== Single albums ===
Title	Details	Peak chart positions	Sales
Title	Details	KOR Circle	Sales
Repeat the Same Words (했던 말 또하고)	Released: January 2, 2012; Label: PK Media; Format: CD, digital download	3	KOR: 2,954
Let's Koyote	Released: October 5, 2022; Label: JG Star, KYT Entertainment; Format: CD, digital download	—	
Call Me	Released: August 6, 2025; Label: JG Star, KYT Entertainment; Format: CD, digital download	—	
"—" denotes releases that did not chart.

=== Extended plays ===
Title	Details	Peak chart positions	Sales	Track listing
Title	Details	KOR	Sales	Track listing
Koyote Ugly	Released: June 10, 2010; Label: LOEN Entertainment; Format: CD, digital download	14		Track list: 1. Lovely (feat. Chun Myung-hoon); 2. 녹턴 (Nocturne: 야상곡); 3. 리턴 (Return); 4. 사랑하긴 했니; 5. Spark; 6. 리턴 (Return) (MR); 7. 사랑하긴 했니 (MR)
Good Good Han Koyote	Released: August 19, 2011; Label: LOEN Entertainment; Format: CD, digital download	13	KOR: 1,541	Track list: 1. 이제와 싫다면; 2. Good Good Time; 3. 우리 사귀자; 4. Let It Try; 5. 이제와 싫다면 (inst.); 6. Good Good Time (inst.)
1999	Released: January 22, 2014; Label: KYT Entertainment; Format: CD, digital download	21	KOR: 911	Track list: 1. 1999; 2. 너까지 왜그래 (What Happened To You); 3. 눈이 내려와 (It's Snowing); 4. 안아줘요 (Hug Me); 5. 이 겨울이 가도 (After Winter (feat. Kal Sowon)); 6. 1999 (inst.)

=== Singles ===
Title	Year	Peak chart position		Album
Title	Year	KOR	KOR Hot	Album
"Genuine" (순정, 纯情)	1999	—	—	Koyote Volume 1
"Meeting" (만남)	1999	—	—	Koyote Volume 1
"Shilyeon" (실연, 失恋)	1999	—	—	Koyotae 2nd
"Miryon" (미련, 迷恋)	1999	—	—	Koyotae 2nd
"Passion"	2000	—	—	Passion
"Paran" (파란, 波澜)	2000	—	—	Passion
"Pride" (자존심, 自尊心)	2000	—	—	Passion
"Sad Dream" (비몽, 悲梦)	2002	—	—	Philip
"Pity" (애련, 哀怜)	2002	—	—	Philip
"Over"	2002	—	—	Philip
"Emergency" (비상, 非常)	2003	—	—	Emergency
"Disco King" (디스코왕)	2004	—	—	Koyote 6
"Bingo" (빙고)	2004	—	—	Rainbow
"1,2,3,4"	2005	—	—	Feel Up
"Paran (Non-Stop Remix)"	2005	—	—	Feel Up
"Wound" (상처, 伤痕)	2006	—	—	Non-album single
"Sangsang" (상상)	2006	—	—	The Koyote in Ballad Special
"I Love Rock & Roll"	2006	—	—	London Koyote
"I Love Rock & Roll (New Remix Ver.)"	2006	—	—	Non-album single
"Bingo" (빙고) (with Typhoon)	2007	—	—	White Story (single)
"Only One" (너만이)	2008	—	—	Non-album single
"Nonsense" (넌센스)	2009	—	—	Jumping
"Oh, Yes!"	2009	—	—	Non-album single
"Do You Even Love Me?" (사랑하긴 했니)	2010	7	—	Koyote Ugly
"Return" (리턴)	2010	6	—	Koyote Ugly
"Jump, Jump, Jump"	2010	52	—	Non-album singles
"White Love" (스키장에서)	2010	70	—	Non-album singles
"Good Good Time"	2011	26	30	Good Good Han Koyote
"Saying What I Said Over and Over Again" (했던 말 또 하고)	2012	16	26	Non-album singles
"I See The Lies" (거짓말도 보여요)	2013	56	61	Non-album singles
"Marry Me"	2013	46	33	Non-album singles
"Hollywood" (feat. Jeong Jun-ha)	2013	21	9	Non-album singles
"After Winter" (이 겨울이 가도) (feat. Kal So-won)	2013	94	—	1999
"Hug Me" (안아줘요)	2013	90	—	1999
"1999"	2014	73	41	1999
"Stop Love" (멈춘사랑)	2015	— (Note: "Stop Love" peaked at number 99 on the domestic Gaon Digital Chart.)	—	Non-album singles
"1024"	2015	—	—	Non-album singles
"Bing Bing"	2016	—	—	Non-album singles
"Poison" (포이즌)	2016	—	—	Singderella Special Song Vol.5
"Entreaty" (애원)	2018	—	—	REborn
"Our Dream" (우리의 꿈)	2018	—	—	REborn
"Fact" (팩트)	2019	— (Note: "Fact" did not enter the Gaon Digital Chart top 200 but appeared at number 132 on the component Download Chart.)	—	REborn
"Hit & Hit" (히트다 히트)	2020	—	—	Non-album singles
"The Sea" (바다)	2020	102	47	Non-album singles
"Ah Ha (Oh My Summer)" (아하 (Oh My Summer))	2020	95	59	Oh My Summer
"Delete" (삭제)	2020	—	—	KoyoteXLindaG
"Odd Imagination" (엉뚱한 상상)	2020	—	—	Non-album singles
"Farewell with that Star" (이별 저 별)	2020	—	—	Non-album singles
"Sea Bird" (바다새)	2021	—	—	Non-album singles
"Go"	2022	181	—	Non-album singles
"—" denotes releases that did not chart or were not released in that region.

=== Other charted songs ===
Title	Year	Peak chart position		Album
Title	Year	KOR	KOR Hot 100	Album
"If You Say You Don't Like It Now" (이제와 싫다면)	2011	20	43	Good Good Han Koyote

=== Collaborations ===
- 코요테 & NRG의 神나는 X-Mas (2 CD), 2001.12 (with N.R.G.)

== Ambassadorship ==
- Public relations ambassador Korea Youth Federation (2023)

== Awards and nominations ==
Year	Award	Category	Nominated work	Result	Ref.
1999	SBS Gayo Daejeon	Rookie Award		Won	
1999	Seoul Music Awards	Rookie Award		Won	
2000	KMTV Korean Music Awards	Bonsang (Main Prize)		Won	
2000	Mnet Music Video Festival	Best Mixed Group	"Passion"	Nominated	
2001	Golden Disc Awards	Bonsang (Main Prize)	"Blue" (파란)	Won	
2001	KBS Music Awards	Bonsang (Main Prize)		Won	
2001	KMTV Korean Music Awards	Bonsang (Main Prize)		Won	
2001	Mnet Music Video Festival	Best Mixed Group	"Blue" (파란)	Won	
2001	SBS Gayo Daejeon	Dance Award		Won	
2002	Golden Disc Awards	Bonsang (Main Prize)	"Sad Dream" (비몽)	Won	
2002	KBS Music Awards	Bonsang (Main Prize)		Won	
2002	KMTV Korean Music Awards	Bonsang (Main Prize)		Won	
2002	Mnet Music Video Festival	Best Mixed Group	"Y"	Nominated	
2002	SBS Gayo Daejeon	Bonsang (Main Prize)		Won	
2002	Seoul Music Awards	Bonsang (Main Prize)		Won	
2003	Golden Disc Awards	Bonsang (Main Prize)	"Emergency" (비상)	Won	
2003	KBS Music Awards	Bonsang (Main Prize)		Won	
2003	KBS Music Awards	Producer's Popularity Award		Won	
2003	KMTV Korean Music Awards	Bonsang (Main Prize)		Won	
2003	MBC Top 10 Singers Song Festival	Top 10 Singer Award	"Emergency" (비상)	Won	
2003	Mnet Music Video Festival	Best Mixed Group	"Emergency" (비상)	Won	
2003	SBS Gayo Daejeon	Bonsang (Main Prize)		Won	
2003	Seoul Music Awards	Bonsang (Main Prize)		Won	
2004	Golden Disc Awards	Bonsang (Main Prize)	"Disco King" (디스코 왕)	Won	
2004	KBS Music Awards	Bonsang (Main Prize)		Won	
2004	MBC Top 10 Singers Song Festival	Top 10 Singer Award	"Disco King" (디스코 왕)	Won	
2004	Mnet Km Music Video Festival	Best Mixed Group	"Disco King" (디스코 왕)	Won	
2004	SBS Gayo Daejeon	Bonsang (Main Prize)		Won	
2004	Seoul Music Awards	Bonsang (Main Prize)		Won	
2005	Golden Disc Awards	Bonsang (Main Prize)	"Bingo"	Won	
2005	KBS Music Awards	Bonsang (Main Prize)	"1, 2, 3, 4"	Won	
2005	Mnet Km Music Video Festival	Best Mixed Group	"1, 2, 3, 4"	Won	
2009	Mnet Asian Music Awards	Best Mixed Group	"Nonsense"	Nominated	
