= List of awards and nominations received by Rain =

Rain
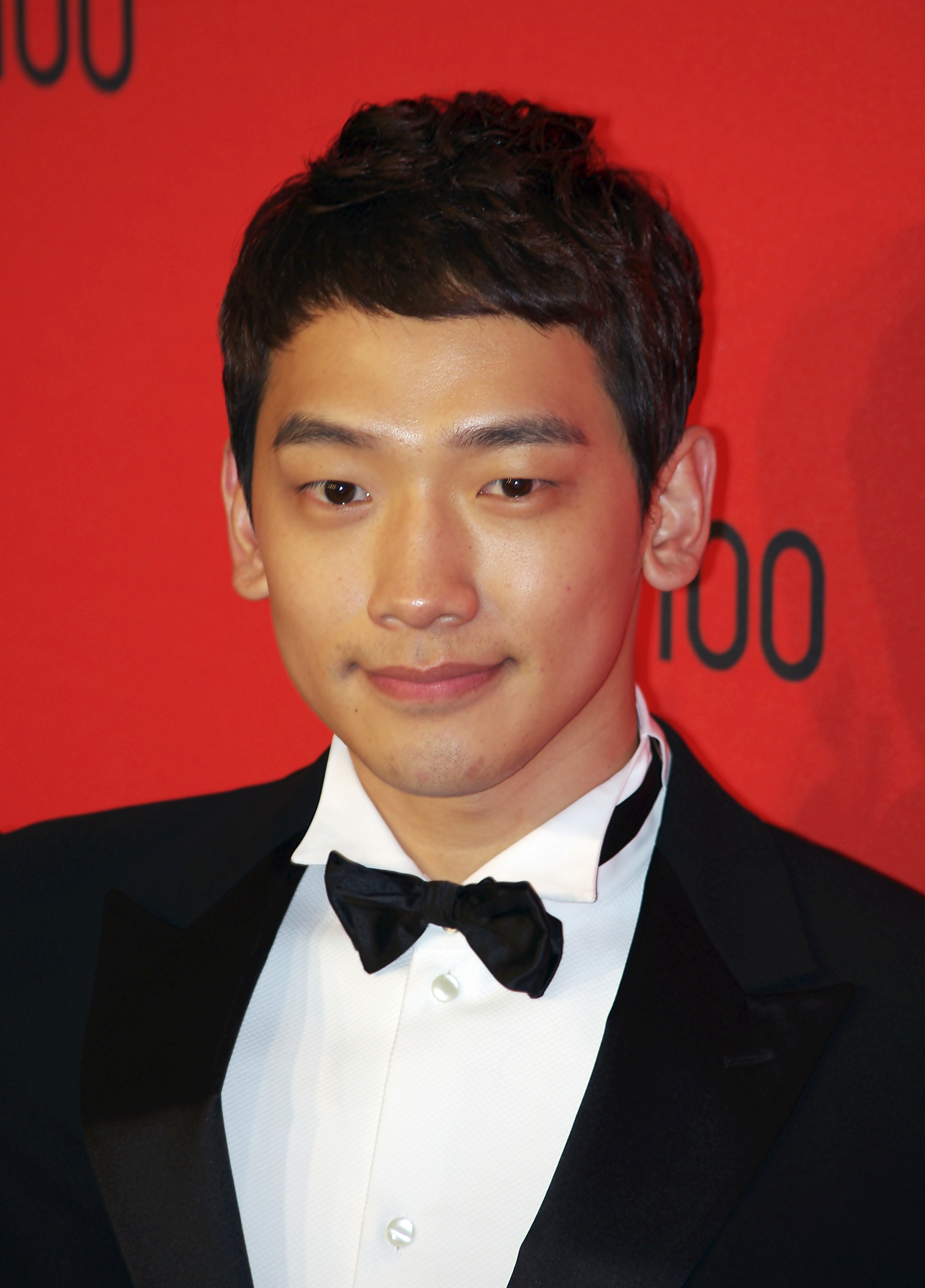
- Rain at the 2011 Time 100 gala.
Awards and nominations
Award	Wins	Nominations

Totals (Note: Certain award groups do not simply award one winner. They acknowledge several different recipients, have runners-up, and have third place. Since this is a specific recognition and is different from losing an award, runner-up mentions are considered wins in this award tally. For simplification and to avoid errors, each award in this list has been presumed to have had a prior nomination.)
- Wins: 63
- Nominations: 92

This is a list of awards and other recognitions earned by South Korean singer and actor Rain.

== Awards and nominations ==
Name of award ceremony, year awarded, category, nominated work, and result
Award ceremony	Year	Category	Nominee / work	Result	Ref.
André Kim Best Star Awards	2004	Star Award	Rain	Won	
Asian Film Awards	2007	Best Actor	I'm a Cyborg, But That's OK	Nominated	
Baeksang Arts Awards	2004	Best New Actor – Television	Sang Doo! Let's Go to School	Nominated	
Baeksang Arts Awards	2004	Most Popular Actor – Television	Sang Doo! Let's Go to School	Won	
Baeksang Arts Awards	2007	Best New Actor – Film	I'm a Cyborg, But That's OK	Won	
Bazaar Men Style People of the Year Awards	2013	Top Asian Entertainer	Rain	Won	
Blue Dragon Film Awards	2007	Best New Actor	I'm a Cyborg, But That's OK	Nominated	
CCTV-MTV Music Awards	2005	Korean Artist of the Year	Rain	Won	
Channel V Thailand Music Video Awards	2005	Top Asian Artist	Rain	Won	
China Music Awards	2015	Most Influential Korean Artist	Rain	Won	
China Urban Fashion Festival	2015	Asian Honor Award	Rain	Won	
CICI Korea Image Awards	2008	Korea Image Stepping Stone Award	Rain	Won	
Golden Disc Awards	2002	Best New Artist	Bad Guy	Won	
Golden Disc Awards	2004	Main Prize (Bonsang)	It's Raining	Won	
Golden Disc Awards	2008	Main Prize (Bonsang)	Rainism	Won	
Grand Bell Awards	2007	Best New Actor	I'm a Cyborg, But That's OK	Nominated	
Grand Bell Awards	2007	Korean Wave Popularity Award	I'm a Cyborg, But That's OK	Won	
Green Planet Movie Awards	2010	Outstanding Asian in Hollywood	Ninja Assassin	Won	
Green Planet Movie Awards	2010	Asian Cultural Ambassador of the Year	Rain	Won	
Green Planet Movie Awards	2010	Best International Entertainer	Rain	Won	
Hito Music Awards	2006	Best Asian Pop Song	"I Do"	Won	
Hito Music Awards	2009	Best Asian Pop Song	"Rainism"	Won	
IFPI Hong Kong Top Sales Music Award	2005	Best Sales Releases, Japanese and Korean	It's Raining	Won	
IFPI Hong Kong Top Sales Music Award	2005	Best Sales Releases, Japanese and Korean	Rainy Day First Live Concert	Won	
IFPI Hong Kong Top Sales Music Award	2007	Best Sales Releases, Japanese and Korean	Rain's World	Won	
KBS Drama Awards	2003	Best New Actor	Sang Doo! Let's Go to School	Won	
KBS Drama Awards	2003	Netizen Award, Actor	Sang Doo! Let's Go to School	Won	
KBS Drama Awards	2003	Popularity Award, Actor	Sang Doo! Let's Go to School	Won	
KBS Drama Awards	2003	Best Couple Award with Gong Hyo-jin	Sang Doo! Let's Go to School	Won	
KBS Drama Awards	2004	Excellence Award, Actor	Full House	Won	
KBS Drama Awards	2004	Best Couple Award with Song Hye-kyo	Full House	Won	
KBS Drama Awards	2004	Netizen Award, Actor	Full House	Won	
KBS Drama Awards	2004	Popularity Award, Actor	Full House	Won	
KBS Drama Awards	2005	Top Excellence Award, Actor	A Love to Kill	Nominated	
KBS Drama Awards	2005	Netizen Award, Actor	A Love to Kill	Won	
KBS Drama Awards	2010	Excellence Award, Actor in a Mid-length Drama	The Fugitive: Plan B	Nominated	
KBS Drama Awards	2010	Best Couple Award with Lee Na-young	The Fugitive: Plan B	Nominated	
KBS Music Awards	2002	Popularity Award – Youth Category	Rain	Won	
KBS Music Awards	2004	Grand Prize	"It's Raining"	Won	
Korea Entertainment Art Awards	2003	New Generation Singer	Rain	Won	
Korean Film Awards	2007	Best New Actor	I'm a Cyborg, But That's OK	Nominated	
KMTV Music Awards	2002	Best New Artist	Rain	Won	
KMTV Music Awards	2003	Male Artist of the Year	Rain	Won	
MBC Drama Awards	2019	Top Excellence Award in a Monday-Tuesday Miniseries	Welcome 2 Life	Nominated	
MBC Drama Awards	2019	Best Couple Award with Lim Ji-yeon	Welcome 2 Life	Nominated	
MBC Gayo Daejejeon	2002	Top 10 Singer (Bonsang)	Rain	Won	
MBC Gayo Daejejeon	2003	Top 10 Singer (Bonsang)	Rain	Won	
MBC Gayo Daejejeon	2004	Top 10 Singer (Bonsang)	Rain	Won	
Mnet Asian Music Awards	2002	Best New Male Artist	"Bad Guy"	Won	
Mnet Asian Music Awards	2003	Mobile Popularity Award	"Ways to Avoid the Sun"	Won	
Mnet Asian Music Awards	2003	Best Male Artist	"Ways to Avoid the Sun"	Nominated	
Mnet Asian Music Awards	2004	Most Popular Music Video (Daesang)	"It's Raining"	Won	
Mnet Asian Music Awards	2004	Best Male Video	"It's Raining"	Nominated	
Mnet Asian Music Awards	2004	Best Dance Video	"It's Raining"	Nominated	
Mnet Asian Music Awards	2005	Best Video Performer	"Me"	Nominated	
Mnet Asian Music Awards	2006	Artist of the Year (Daesang)	Rain	Nominated	
Mnet Asian Music Awards	2006	Album of the Year (Daesang)	Rain's World	Nominated	
Mnet Asian Music Awards	2006	Best Male Artist	"I'm Coming"	Won	
Mnet Asian Music Awards	2006	Best Music Video	"I'm Coming"	Nominated	
Mnet Asian Music Awards	2006	Best Video Performance	"I'm Coming"	Nominated	
Mnet Asian Music Awards	2009	Best Male Solo Artist	Rain	Nominated	
Mnet Asian Music Awards	2010	Best Male Solo Artist	Rain	Nominated	
Mnet Asian Music Awards	2010	Best Solo Dance Performance	"Love Song"	Won	
Mnet Asian Music Awards	2014	Best Male Artist	Rain	Nominated	
Mnet Asian Music Awards	2014	Best Solo Dance Performance	"30 Sexy"	Nominated	
Mnet Asian Music Awards	2020	2020 Visionary	Rain	Won	
Mnet Asian Music Awards	2020	Best Collaboration	"Summer Hate" (with Zico)	Nominated	
MTV Asia Awards	2005	Favorite Korean Artist	Rain	Won	
MTV Asia Music Gala	2016	Best Overseas Artist	Rain	Won	
MTV Movie Awards	2010	Biggest Badass Star	Ninja Assassin	Won	
MTV Video Music Awards Japan	2005	Best Buzz Asia – Korea	"It's Raining"	Won	
QQ Music Awards	2014	Most Influential Overseas Artist	Rain	Won	
SBS Drama Awards	2014	Top Excellence Award, Actor in a Miniseries	My Lovely Girl	Nominated	
SBS Gayo Daejeon	2002	Rookie Award	Rain	Won	
SBS Gayo Daejeon	2003	Main Prize (Bonsang)	Rain	Won	
SBS Gayo Daejeon	2003	Netizen Popularity Award	Rain	Won	
SBS Gayo Daejeon	2004	Main Prize (Bonsang)	Rain	Won	
SBS Gayo Daejeon	2004	Most Popular Award	Rain	Won	
SBS Gayo Daejeon	2006	Main Prize (Bonsang)	Rain	Won	
Seoul Art & Culture Award	2011	World Star Award	Rain	Won	
Seoul Music Awards	2002	Best New Artist	Rain	Won	
Seoul Music Awards	2003	Main Prize (Bonsang)	Rain	Won	
Seoul Music Awards	2004	Main Prize (Bonsang)	Rain	Won	
Sports Korea Awards	2004	Singer of the Year	Rain	Won	
Style Icon Awards	2008	Style Icon of the Year	Rain	Won	
Supersound Festival	2025	Super Global Entertainer	Rain	Won	
Virgin Radio Hitz 40 Award	2005	Best Asian Artist	Rain	Won	
World Music Awards	2014	World's Best Song	"30 Sexy"	Nominated	
World Music Awards	2014	World's Best Music Video	"30 Sexy"	Nominated	
World Music Awards	2014	World's Best Male Artist	Rain	Nominated	
World Music Awards	2014	World's Best Live Act	Rain	Nominated	
World Music Awards	2014	World's Best Entertainer	Rain	Nominated	

== Other accolades ==
=== State and cultural honors ===
Name of country or organization, year awarded, and honor
Country or organization	Year	Honor	Ref.
Asia Society	2019	Entertainment Game Changer	
18th Korea Entertainment Producers Association	2010	Korea Creative Content Agency Merit Award	
45th Korea Savings' Day	2008	Presidential Commendation	

=== Listicles ===
Name of publisher, year listed, name of listicle, and placement
Publisher	Year	Listicle	Ranking	Ref.
Forbes	2009	Korea Power Celebrity 40	8th	
Forbes	2010	Korea Power Celebrity 40	15th	
Forbes	2011	Korea Power Celebrity 40	13th	
Forbes	2012	Korea Power Celebrity 40	38th	
Forbes	2021	Korea Power Celebrity 40	36th	
Mnet	2013	Legend 100 Artists	47th	
Sports Dong-a	2008	100 leaders of the Korean entertainment industry	3rd	
Time	2006	Time 100	Placed	
Time	2011	Time 100	Placed	
