= MAMA Award for Best Male Artist =

Korean television award

MAMA Award for Best Male Solo
- Country: South Korea
- Presented by: CJ E&M Pictures (Mnet)
- First award: 1999
- Currently held by: Yeonjun (2026)

Highlights
- Most awards: Baekhyun, G-Dragon (3)
- Most nominations: Psy (7)
- Website: Mnet Asian Music Awards

The MAMA Award for Best Male Solo (남자 가수상) is an award presented annually by CJ E&M Pictures (Mnet).

It was first awarded at the 1st Mnet Asian Music Awards ceremony held in 1999; Lee Seung-hwan won the award for his song "A Request", and it is given in honor of a male artist with the best performance in the music industry.

== Winners and nominees ==
=== 1990s ===
Year	Winner	Work	Nominees
1999	Lee Seung-hwan	"A Request"	Park Jin-young – "Kiss Me"; Yoo Seung-jun – "Passion"; Jo Sung-mo – "For Your Soul"; K2 – " To Her Lover"

=== 2000s ===
Year	Winner	Work	Nominees
2000	Shin Seung-hun	"The Unwritten Legend"	Seo Taiji – "Ultramania"; Lee Seung-hwan – "Live A Long Long Time"; Jo Sung-mo – "Do You Know"; Hong Kyung-min – "Shaky Friendship"
2001	Kangta	"Polaris"	Moon Hee-joon – "Alone"; Yoo Seung-jun – "Wow"; Im Chang-jung – "Reason To Wait"; Jo Sung-mo – "Goodbye My Love"
2002	Sung Si-kyung	"We Make A Good Pair"	Kangta – "Memories"; Moon Hee-joon – "Generous"; Shin Seung Hun – "If We Can Part Even Though We Love"; Lee Seung-hwan – "Mistake"
2003	Wheesung	"With Me"	Kim Gun-mo – "Wedding Invitation"; Rain – "Ways To Avoid The Sun"; Lee Juck – "I Didn't Know That Time"; Jo Sung-mo – "Piano"
2004	Se7en (Note: Titled as "Best Male Video" award.)	"Passion"	Rain – "It's Raining"; Seo Taiji – "Robot"; MC Mong – "180°"; Wheesung – "Incurable Disease"
2005	Kim Jong-kook	"Standstill"	MC Mong – "Invincible"; YB – "It Must Have Been Love"; Jo Sung-mo – "Mr. Flower"; Wheesung – "Goodbye Luv"
2006	Rain	"I'm Coming"	Psy – "Entertainer"; Seven – "I Know"; Lee Seung-gi – "Hard to Say"; Lee Seung-chul – "Scream"
2007	Lee Seung-gi	"White Lie"	Park Hyo-shin – "Memories Resembles Love"; Shin Hye-sung – "The First Person"; Eru – "Because We Are Two"; Lee Juck – "It's Fortunate"
2008	Seo Taiji	"Moai"	Kim Dong-ryool – "Let's Start Again"; Taeyang – "Look At Me Only"; Toy – "Rockin' On Heaven's Door"; MC Mong – "Disco"
2009	Tiger JK	—N/a	Rain; Lee Seung-chul; G-Dragon; MC Mong

=== 2010s ===
Year	Winner	Nominees
2010	Taeyang	Psy; Rain; Seven; Wheesung
2011	Kim Hyun-joong	Kim Bum-soo; Kim Tae-woo; Sung Si-kyung; Wheesung
2012	G-Dragon	K.Will; Park Jin-young (JYP); Se7en; Psy
2013	G-Dragon	Psy; Lee Seung-gi; Lee Seung-chul; Cho Yong-pil
2014	Taeyang	Roy Kim; Rain; Seo Taiji; Im Chang-jung
2015	Park Jin-young	Zion.T; Kyuhyun; Jung Yong Hwa; Jonghyun
2016	Zico	Park Hyo-shin; Psy; Im Chang-jung; Crush
2017	Zico	Yoon Jong-shin; G-Dragon; Zion.T; Psy
2018	Roy Kim	Dean; Park Hyo-shin; Zico; Hwang Chi Yeul
2019	Baekhyun	Park Hyo-shin; Mino; Taemin; Paul Kim

=== 2020s ===
Year	Winner	Nominees
2020	Baekhyun	Kang Daniel; Park Jin-young; Taemin; Zico
2021	Baekhyun	D.O; Kai; Kang Daniel; Lee Mu-jin
2022	Lim Young-woong	J-Hope; Kang Daniel; Psy; Zico
2023	Jimin	Jung Kook; Lim Young-woong; Parc Jae-jung; Taeyang; V
2024	Jung Kook	Baekhyun; Jimin; Lim Young-woong; Taemin
2025	G-Dragon	Baekhyun; J-Hope; Jin; Mark

== Multiple awards ==
3 wins

- Baekhyun
- G-Dragon

2 wins

- Taeyang
- Zico

== Gallery ==
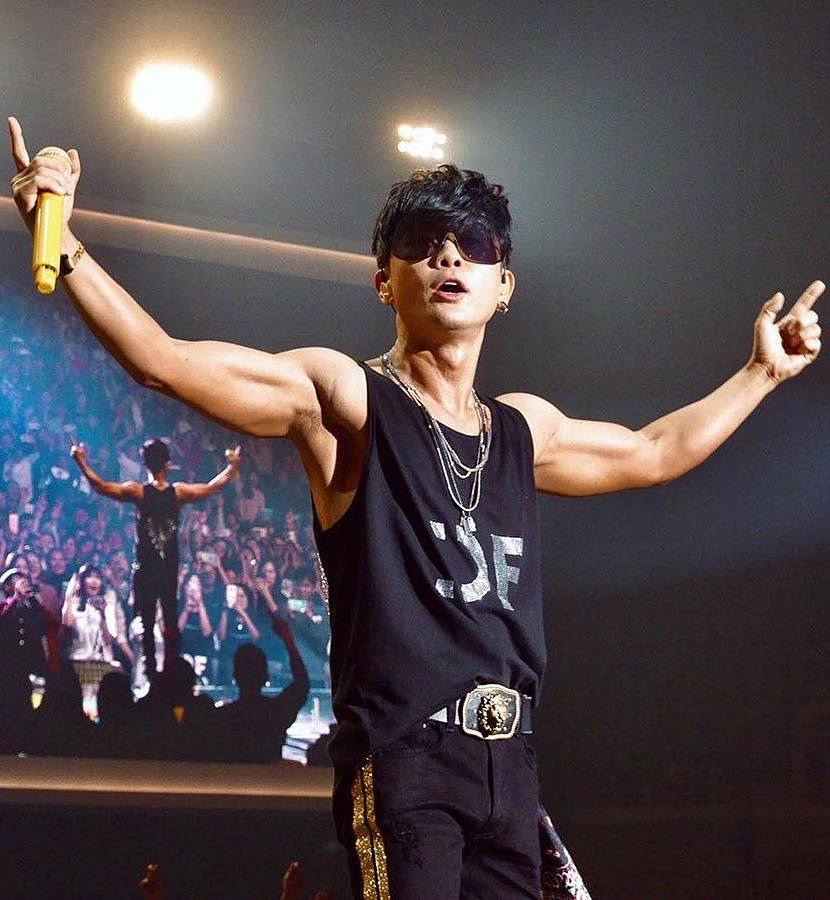
Lee Seung-hwan, (1999)

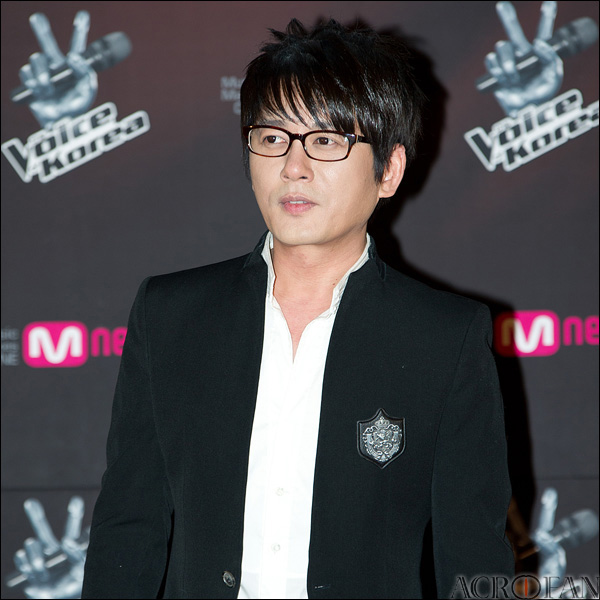
Shin Seung-hun, (2000)

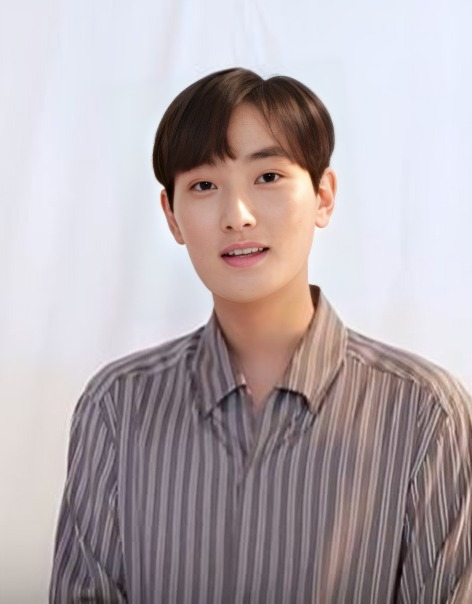
Kangta, (2001)

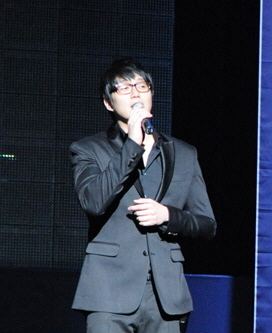
Sung Si-kyung, (2002)

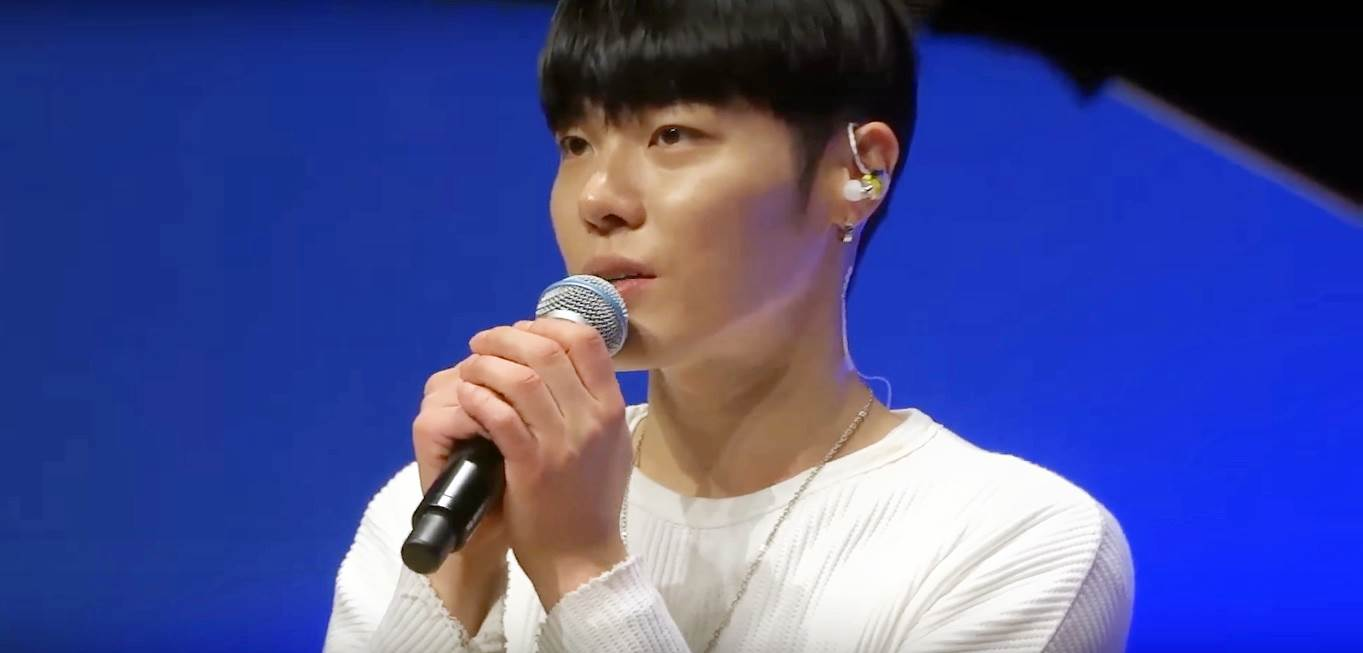
Wheesung, (2003)

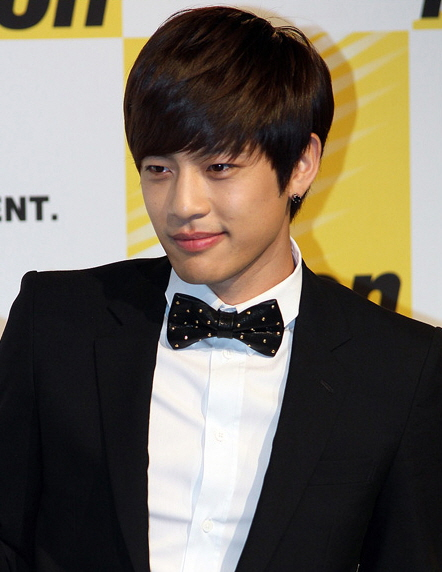
Se7en, (2004)

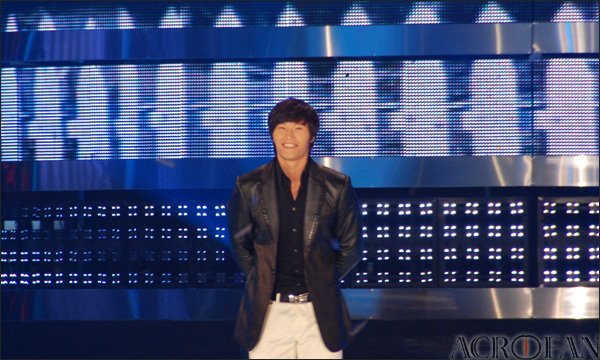
Kim Jong-kook, (2005)

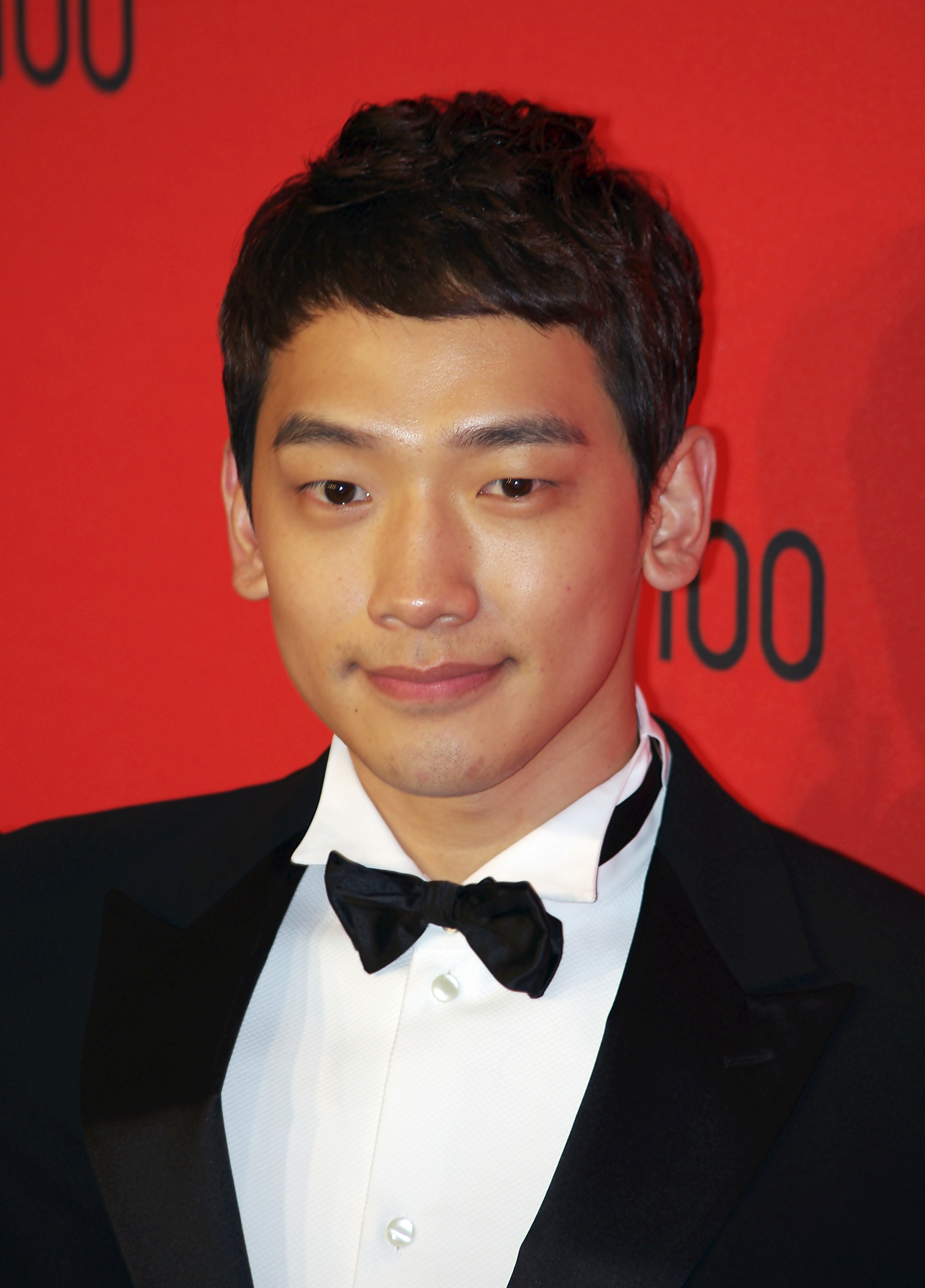
Rain, (2006)

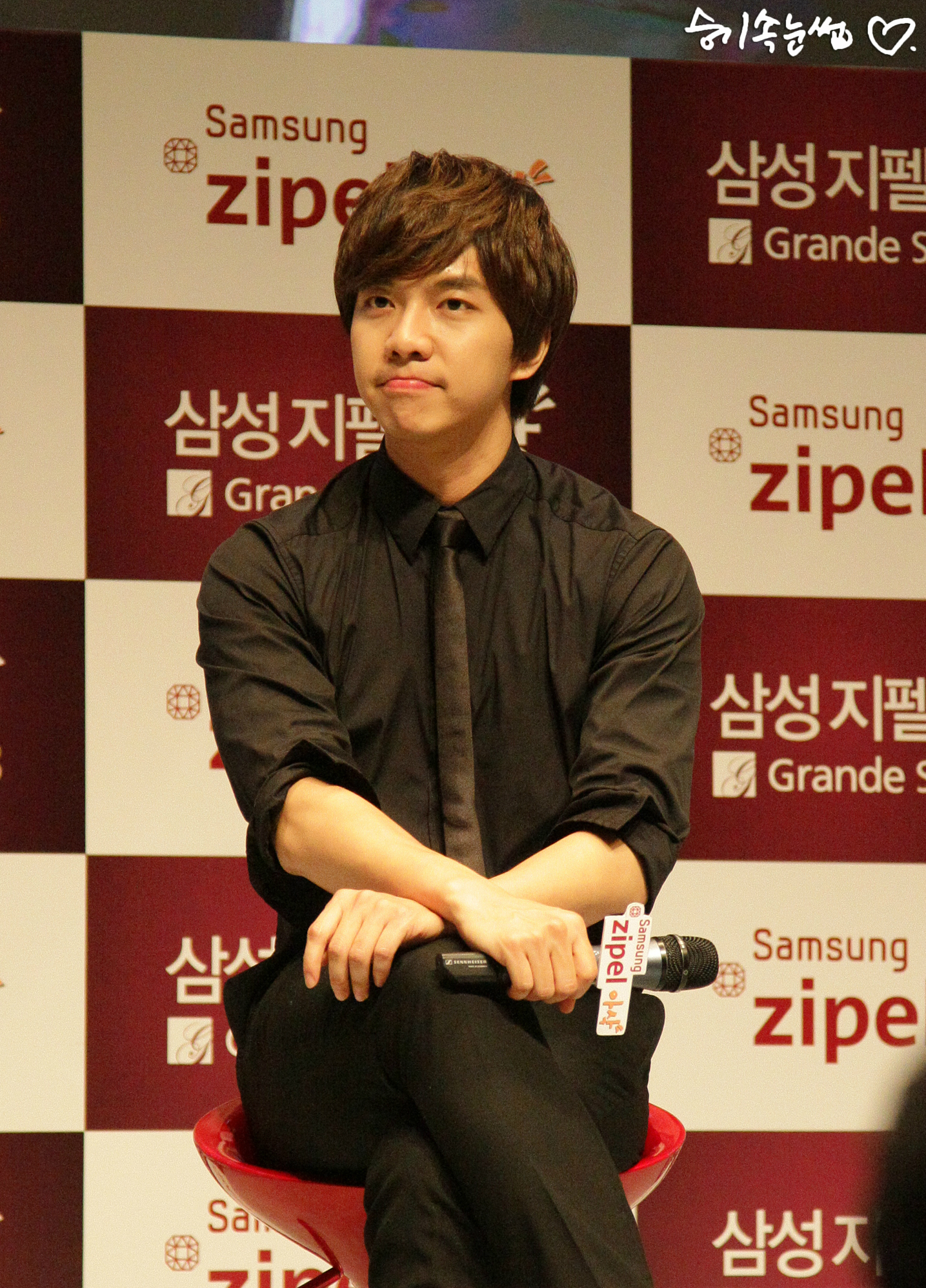
Lee Seung-gi, (2007)

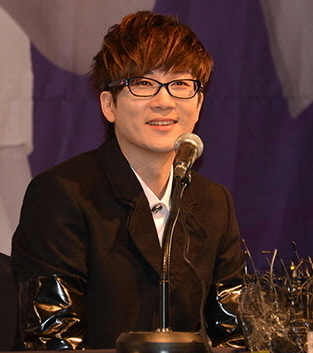
Seo Taiji, (2008)

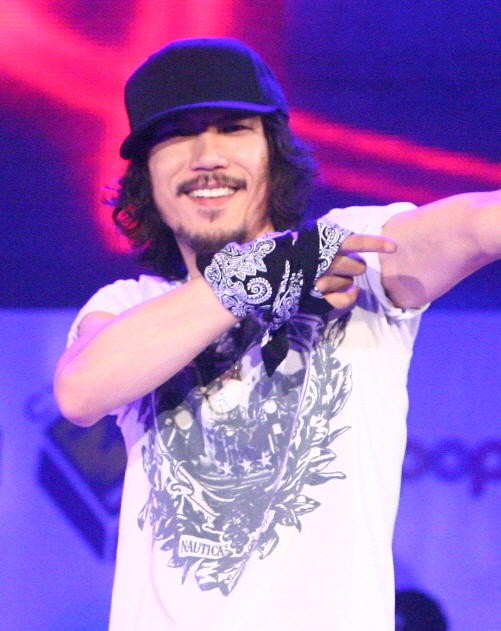
Tiger JK, (2009)

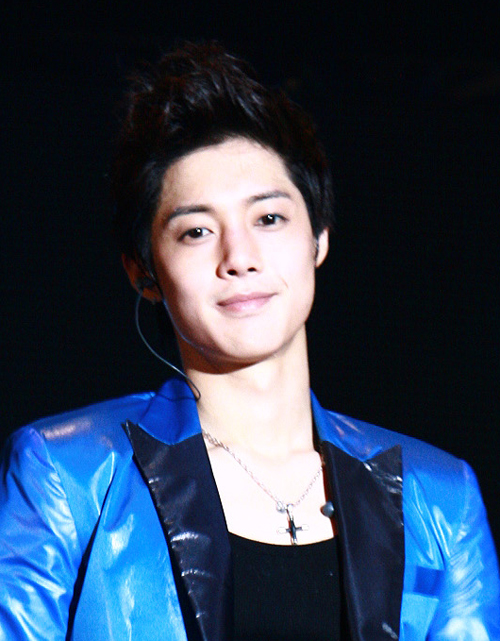
Kim Hyun-joong, (2011)

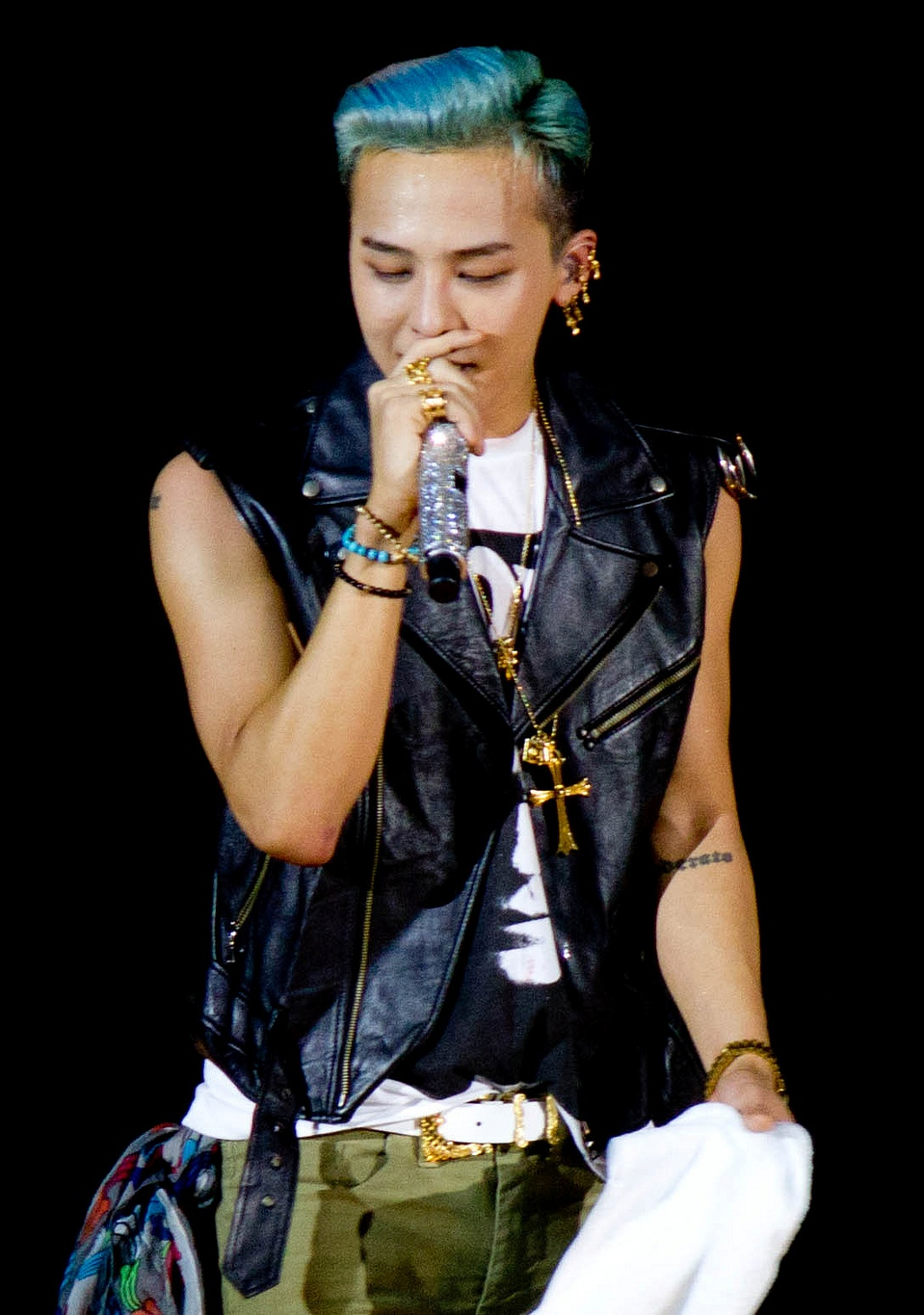
G-Dragon, (2012-13, 2025)

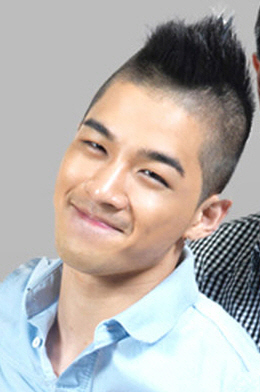
Taeyang, (2010, 14)

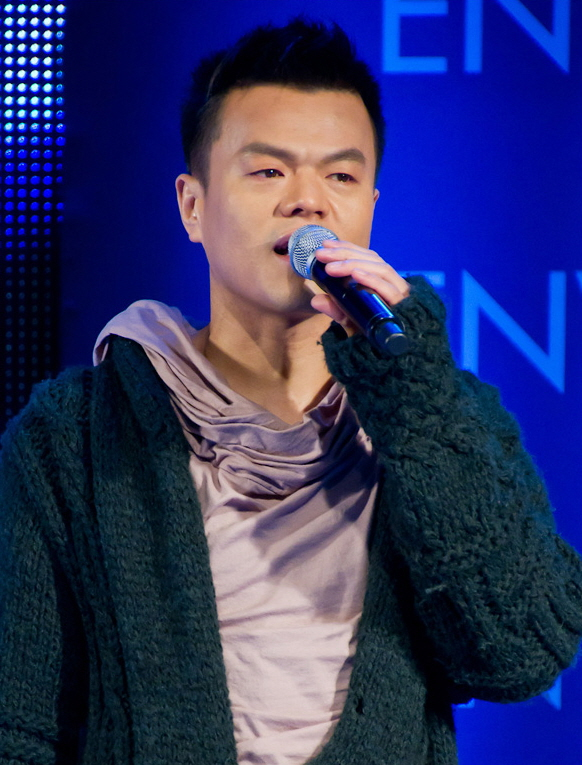
Park Jin-young, (2015)

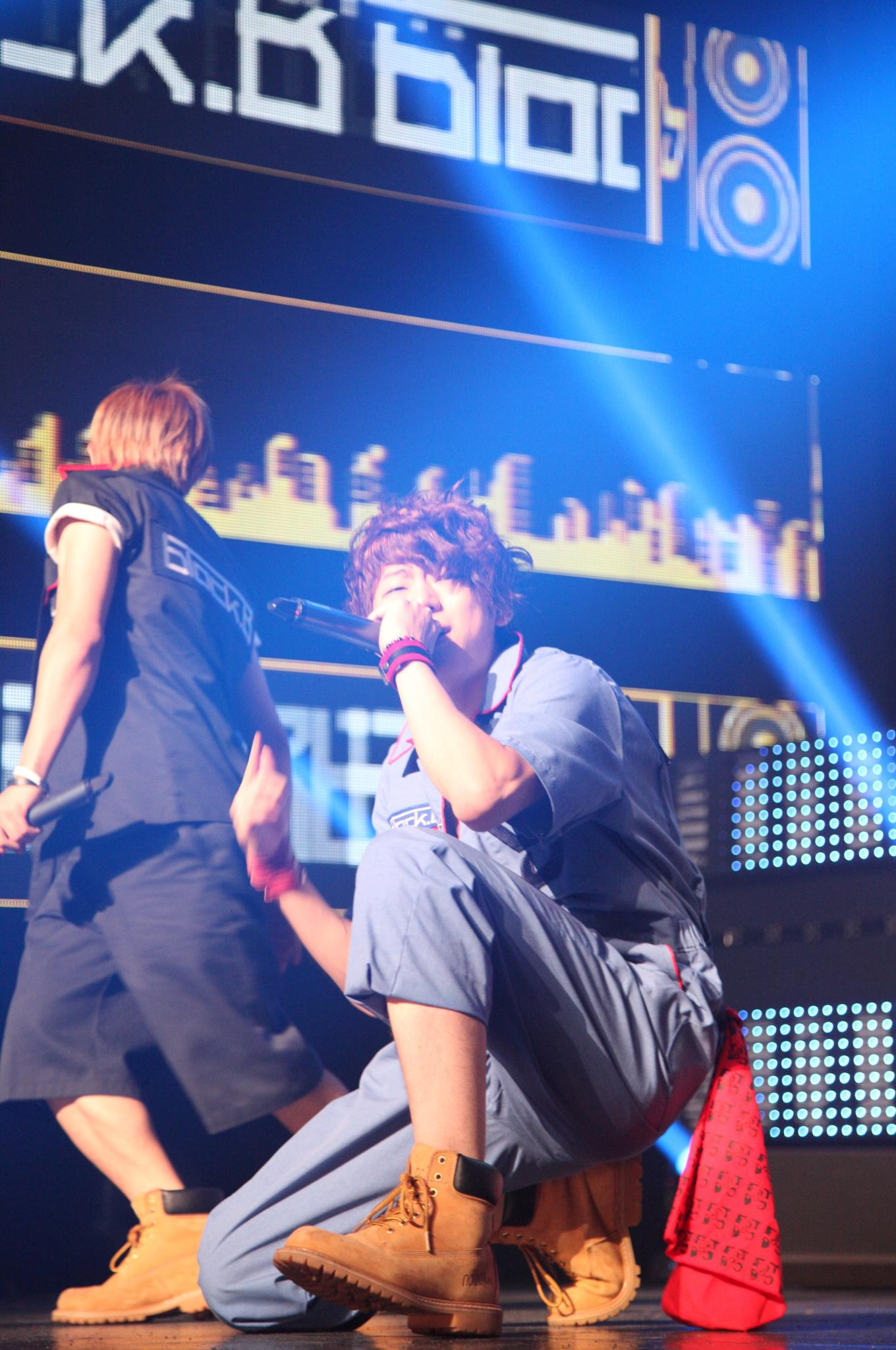
Zico, (2016-17)

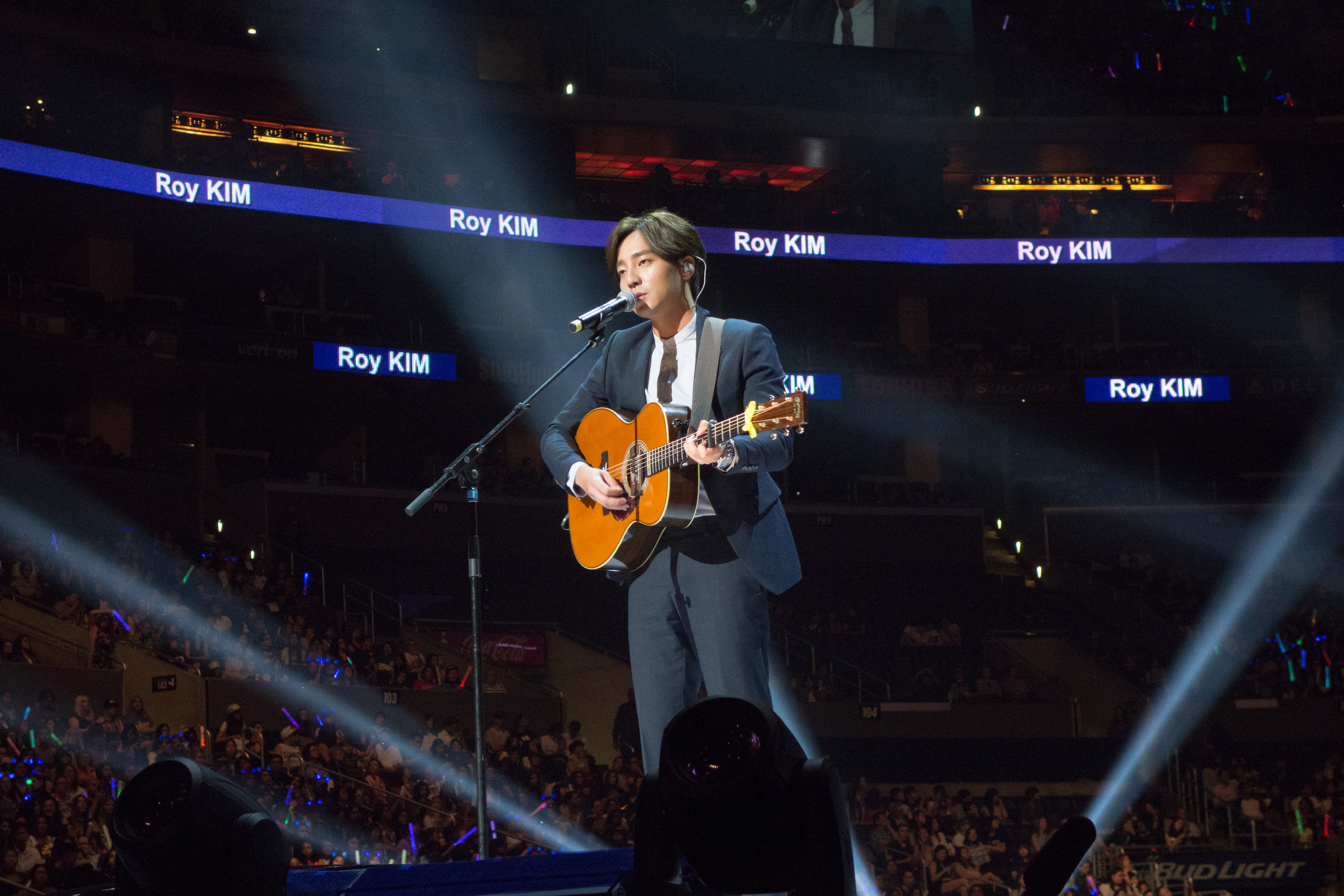
Roy Kim, (2018)

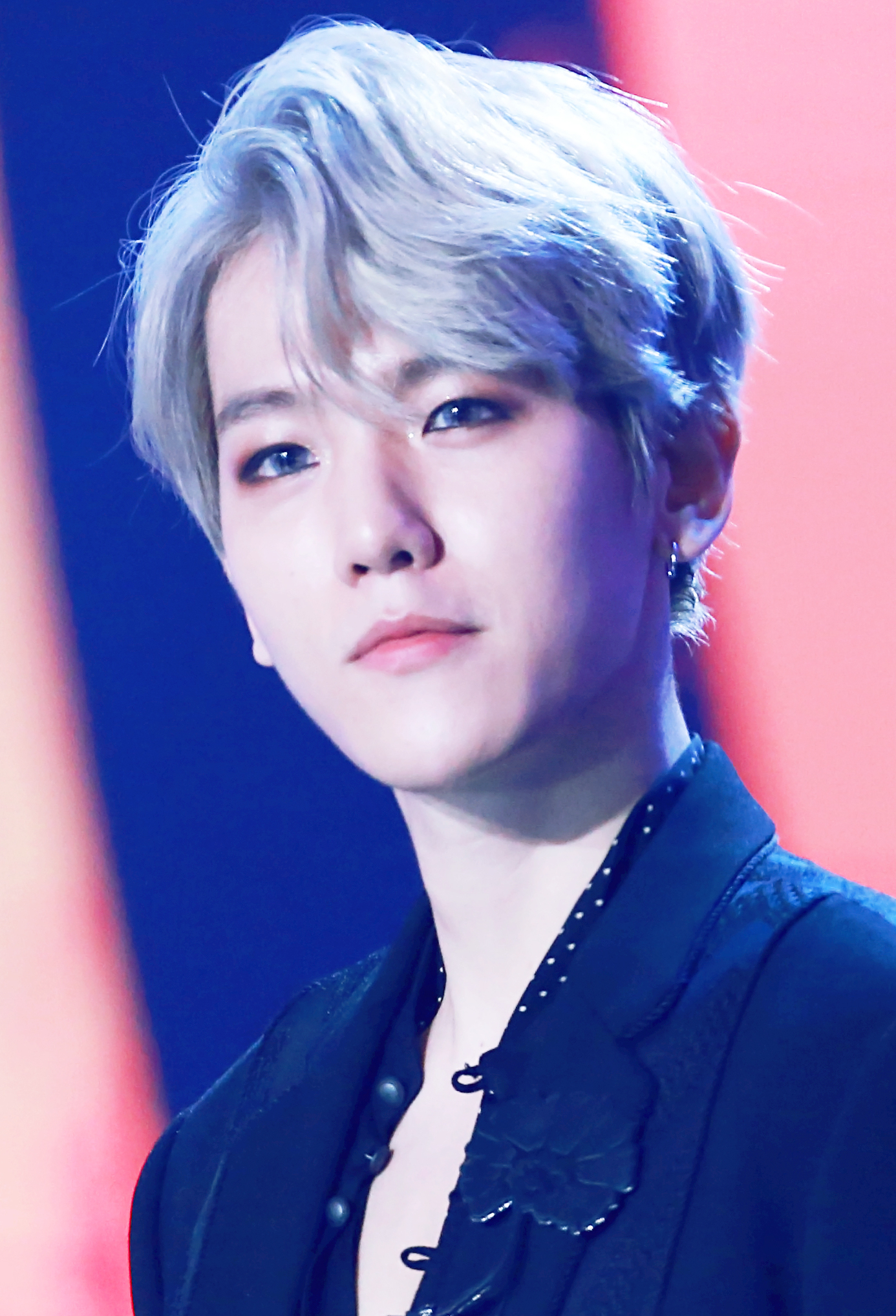
Baekhyun, (2019-21)

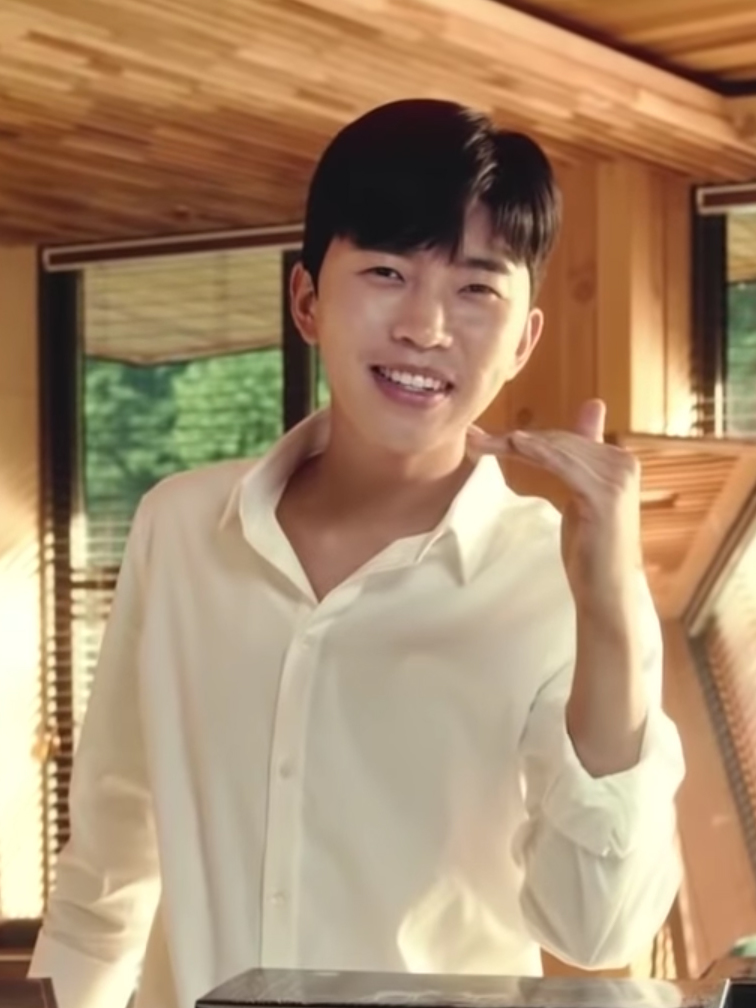
Lim Young-woong, (2022)

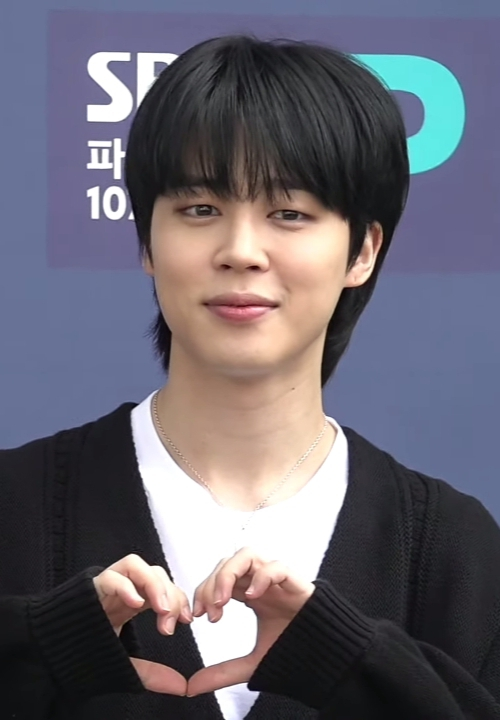
Jimin, (2023)

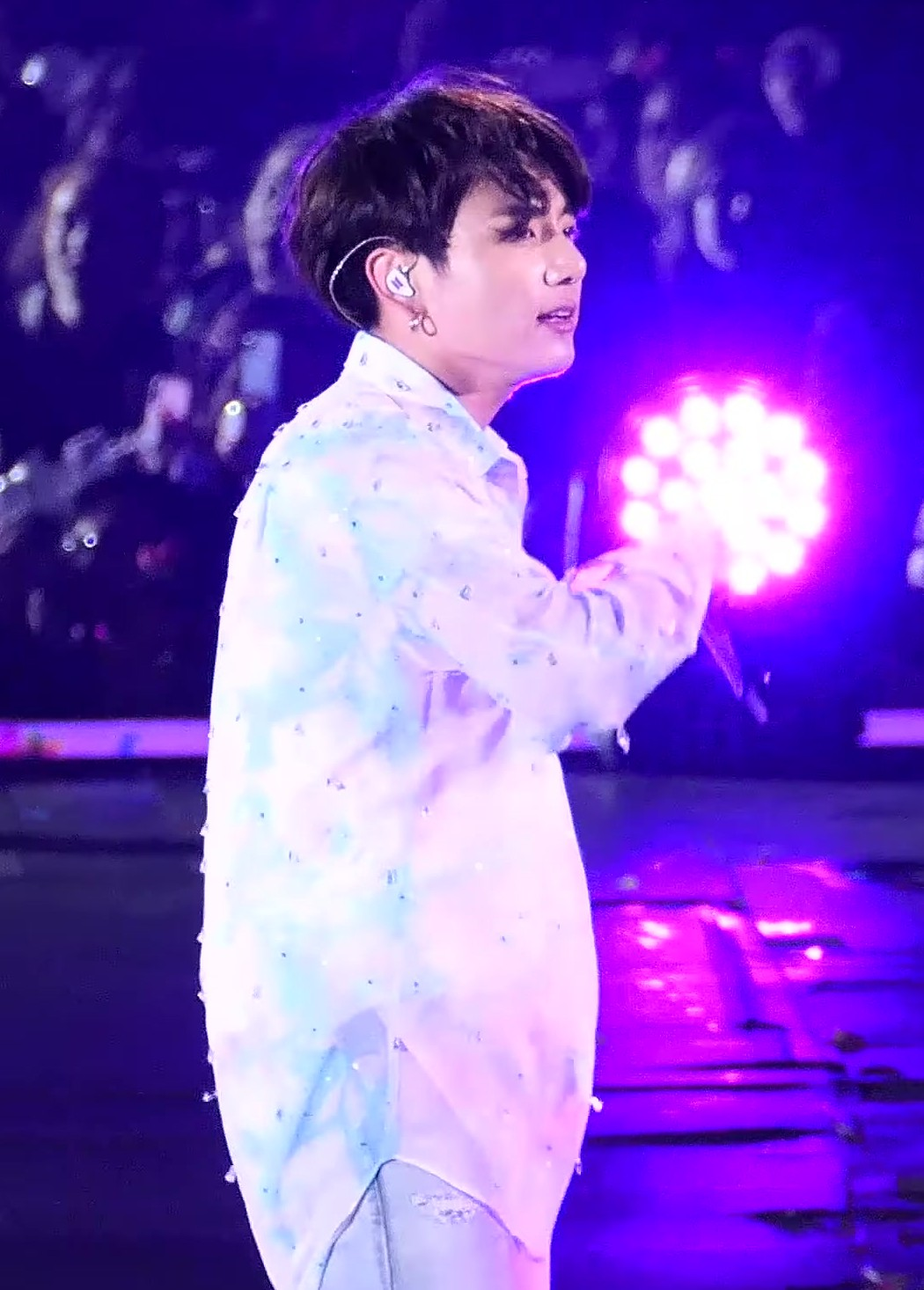
Jung Kook, (2024)

Yeonjun, (2026)
