= I Do =

I Do may refer to:

- "I do", a phrase used in some marriage vows; used by brides and grooms in response to questions posed by either the officiant or the other marriage partner

== Film and TV ==
=== Film ===
- I Do (1921 film), a silent comedic short film starring Harold Lloyd
- I Do (2000 film), a Hong Kong film starring Ella Koon
- I Do (2006 film) (Prête-moi ta main), a French romantic comedy
- I Do (2010 film), a Philippine film starring Enchong Dee & Erich Gonzales
- I Do (2012 American film), an American film directed by Glenn Gaylord
- I Do (2012 Chinese film), a Chinese film directed by Zhou Sun
- I Do (But I Don't), a 2004 TV romantic comedy

=== Television ===
- "I Do (TV series)", a Philippine reality television show on ABS-CBN
- I Do?, a Taiwanese drama series on TVBS Joy Channel
- "I Do" (Glee), a 2013 episode
- "I Do" (Lost), a 2006 episode
- "I Do" (NCIS: New Orleans), a 2015 episode
- "I Do", an episode of ER (season 12)
- "I Do", an episode of Rugrats
- "I Do, I Do", an episode of The New Adventures of Wonder Woman

== Music ==
=== Songs ===
- "I Do" (Arvingarna song)
- "I Do" (Blaque song)
- "I Do" (Cardi B song)
- "I Do" (The Castells song)
- "I Do" (Colbie Caillat song), 2011
- "I Do" (D.O. song), 2023
- "I Do" (Fabrizio Faniello song)
- "I Do" (Fleetwood Mac song)
- "I Do" ((G)I-dle song), 2023
- "I Do" (Gin Wigmore song)
- "I Do" (Jamelia song)
- "I Do" (Jessie James Decker song)
- "I Do" (Jewel song)
- "I Do" (Lisa Loeb song)
- "I Do" (Morgan Evans song)
- "I Do" (Nina Girado song)
- "I Do" (Paul Brandt song)
- "I Do" (Rain song)
- "I Do" (Young Jeezy song)
- "I Do (Cherish You)", a song by Mark Wills, also covered by 98 Degrees
- "I Do (Wanna Get Close to You)", a song by 3LW
- "I Do!!", a song by Toya
- "I Do", a song by Anastacia from Anastacia
- "I Do", a song by Apink from Pink Memory
- "I Do", a song by Chingy from Powerballin'
- "I Do", a song by Edie Brickell & New Bohemians from Shooting Rubberbands at the Stars
- "I Do", a song by Felix Jaehn from I
- "I Do", a song by Ivy Queen from Drama Queen
- "I Do", a song by Jude
- "I Do", a song by Lil Jon from Crunk Rock
- "I Do", a song by The Marvelows
- "I Do", a song by Moka Only from Airport 5
- "I Do", a song by Neil Young and Crazy Horse from their album Colorado
- "I Do", a song by Paul Heaton from The Cross Eyed Rambler
- "I Do", a song by Paul McCartney from "Driving Rain"
- "I Do", a song by Pedro the Lion from Achilles Heel
- "I Do", a song by Placebo from Once More With Feeling
- "I Do", a song by Stray Kids from This & That
- "I Do", a song by Uncle Kracker from No Stranger to Shame
- "I Do", a song by Weezer, a B-side of the single "Hash Pipe"
- "I Do", a song by Westlife from Back Home
- "I Do (Whatcha Say Boo)", a song by Jon B. from Cool Relax

== See also ==
- "I Do Do", an episode of the American TV series 30 Rock
- "iDo", an episode of iCarly
- I Do, I Do (disambiguation)
- "I Do, I Do, I Do, I Do, I Do", a song by the Swedish band ABBA
- I Do Now I Don't, e-commerce website
- Sony Ericsson Idou or Sony Ericsson Satio, a smartphone
- Qubool Hai (disambiguation), "I Do" in Hindi-Urdu
