= Kabul (disambiguation) =

Kabul is the capital city of Afghanistan.

Kabul may also refer to:

== Afghanistan ==
- Kabul Subah, a top-level province of the Mughal empire, roughly covering its part of Afghanistan (and Kashmir until that was split-off)
- Kabul Province, the province of modern Afghanistan where the capital city of Kabul is situated
- Kabul River, the main river in the eastern part of Afghanistan

== Israel ==
- Kabul, Israel, a local council in the North District of Israel
  - Cabul, the biblical city thought to be in the vicinity of the modern town

== TV series ==
- Kabul (TV series), a pan-European 2025 television series about the US withdrawal from Afghanistan

== See also ==
- Kabuliwallah (disambiguation)
- Battle of Kabul (disambiguation)
- Fall of Kabul (disambiguation)
- Kabolabad, a village in Iran
- Qubool Hai (disambiguation)
