= It's Raining (album) =

Studio album by Rain
- Released: October 8, 2004
- Recorded: 2004
- Studio: JYPE Studio (Seoul)
- Genres: K-pop; R&B; hip hop
- Length: 49:20
- Language: Korean
- Label: JYP
- Producers: Park Jin-young; Bang Si-hyuk; Lunchsong Project; Hwang Seong-je; Han Sang-won

Rain chronology
How to Avoid the Sun (2003)	It's Raining (2004)	Eternal Rain (2006)

Alternative cover
- Artwork used for other Asian editions

Singles from It's Raining
- 1. "It's Raining" Released: October 8, 2004; 2. "I Do" Released: October 8, 2004

It's Raining is the third Korean-language studio album by South Korean recording artist Rain, released through JYP Entertainment on October 8, 2004. Two singles were promoted for the album with accompanying music videos and promotions on music programs: the title track "It's Raining" and "I Do". The album was released in several territories throughout Asia in 2005, including Japan, Hong Kong and Taiwan.

Commercially, It's Raining peaked at number three on the monthly MIAK album chart in October 2004. It sold 153,577 copies in South Korea by the end of 2004 and was the 17th best-selling album of the year. The album has since sold over 1,000,000 copies throughout Asia according to the Korea Creative Content Agency. The album and its title track won various awards, including the grand prize at the 2004 Mnet KM Music Video Festival and the 2004 KBS Music Awards.

== Background ==
It's Raining is Rain's consecutive album to have been primarily produced by JYP Entertainment founder Park Jin-young. The singer's agency noted that the record was written and produced with both the domestic and international markets in mind, with Rain's role in the popular drama series Full House earlier in the year having helped boosted the singer's recognition and popularity throughout Asia.

It's Raining was released in South Korea through JYP Entertainment on October 8, 2004. A Japanese edition of the album was released in Japan through King Records on February 16, 2005, with the Japanese version of "I Do" serving as the promotional single for the record. In other territories in Asia, the album was released in Hong Kong on June 24 and in Taiwan on August 17, 2005.

== Singles ==
"It's Raining" is the album's title track and was released as the lead single. It explores a more upbeat, hip-hop influenced sound in contrast to his previous releases. It won the Most Popular Music Video daesang award at the 2004 Mnet KM Music Video Festival and the Grand Prize at the annual KBS Music Awards.

"I Do" was released as a follow-up single to the title track. After the success of "It's Raining", "I Do" exhibited a calmer, up-tempo ballad style. The lyrics talk about how he pledges to be the very best for his lover. Its music video shows Rain running from his messy room (where he films a video of himself singing for his girlfriend) to the streets, passing by many couples. Eventually, he reaches the restaurant where his girlfriend is waiting for him, and plucks flowers out of a nearby flower box for her bouquet before greeting her.

== Commercial performance ==
The first single, "It's Raining", along with the album of the same experienced success throughout Southeast Asia, cementing Rain's position as one of the region's top musical acts. A more upbeat, hip-hop influence was displayed on the single "It's Raining" as well as throughout the album. From 2004 to 2006, the album sold over 200,000 copies in South Korea. For the Japanese release, the album was released with a different cover as well as the making of "It's Raining" music video. It peaked at number 15 on the Oricon Albums Chart in Japan and remained on the chart for seven weeks. It sold 100,000 copies in the country according to the Korea Creative Content Agency, although it did not receive a certification from the RIAJ.

== Promotion and live performances ==
Rain held his first concert tour, titled the Rainy Day Tour. The concert tour held shows in 19 concerts in several countries in Asia and North America. It began at the Olympic Hall in Seoul on January 29, 2005, and continued with concerts in China, Japan and Taiwan. His concert at the Workers' Stadium in Beijing in October 2005 attracted 40,000 people.

To promote the release of the Japanese edition of the album, Rain held a showcase at Shibuya-AX on February 21, 2005. In February 2006, the tour expanded into the United States with two shows at The Theater at Madison Square Garden in New York City, making it the largest concert by a K-pop artist in New York City at the time. The tour ended in Bangkok at the Impact Arena on February 26, 2006.

== Accolades ==
"It's Raining" won seven first place music program awards in South Korea, including three awards on Inkigayo leading to a triple crown. "I Do" also won three first place music program awards, including twice on MBC's Music Camp (previous version of Show! Music Core).

Awards and nominations for It's Raining
Organization	Year	Category	Result	Ref.
Golden Disc Awards	2004	Album Bonsang (Main Prize)	Won	
Golden Disc Awards	2004	Album Daesang (Grand Prize)	Nominated	
Hito Music Awards	2006	Best Asian Pop Song (for "I Do")	Won	
IFPI Hong Kong Sales Awards	2005	Best Japanese & Korean Releases	Won	
MBC Gayo Daejejeon	2004	Top 10 Award (Bonsang)	Won	

== Track listing ==
It's Raining track listing
No.	Title	Lyrics	Music	Length
1.	"하고 싶었던 말" (Words I Wanted To Say; Intro)	Park Jin-young		0:47
2.	"It's Raining"	Park Jin-young	Park Jin-young	3:40
3.	"I Do"	Park Jin-young	Park Jin-young, Bang Si-hyuk	3:45
4.	"지운 얼굴" (Familiar Face)	Bang Si-hyuk, Park Chae-won	Hwang Seong-je	4:09
5.	"11 Days"	Park Jin-young	Park Jin-young	2:57
6.	"Quiz"	Park Jin-young	Park Jin-young, Lunch Song Project	3:42
7.	"My Groove" (featuring Epik High)			4:00
8.	"난" (I; Nan)	Bang Si-hyuk	Bang Si-hyuk	3:19
9.	"Biggest Thing"	Park Jin-young	Park Jin-young	4:00
10.	"Wanna Talk"	Park Jin-young	Park Jin-young, Han Sang-won	3:44
11.	"But I Love You"	Park Jin-young	Park Jin-young	3:19
12.	"찾아요" (I'm Searching; Chajayo)	Park Jin-young	Park Jin-young, Bang Si-hyuk	3:57
13.	"No No No"	Park Min-ah		3:19
14.	"To You"	Park Jin-young, Bang Si-hyuk	Park Jin-young, Lunch Song Project	3:38
15.	"I Love You" (Outro; featuring Noel)	Park Jin-young	Park Jin-young, Lunch Song Project	1:04
Total length:				49:20

== Charts ==
=== Weekly charts ===
Chart (2005)	Peak position
Japanese Albums (Oricon)	15
Taiwanese East Asian Albums (G-Music)	1

=== Monthly charts ===
Chart (2004)	Peak position
South Korean Albums (RIAK)	3

=== Year-end charts ===
Chart (2004)	Position
South Korean Albums (RIAK)	17

== Sales ==
Sales for It’s Raining
Region	Sales amount
China	500,000
Indonesia	50,000
Japan	100,000
South Korea	202,764
Taiwan	70,000
Thailand	150,000

== Release history ==
Region	Date	Format(s)	Label(s)
South Korea	October 8, 2004	CD; cassette; digital download	JYP Entertainment
Japan	February 16, 2005	CD; DVD	King Records
Hong Kong	June 24, 2005	CD; DVD	JYP Entertainment
Taiwan	August 17, 2005	CD	JYP Entertainment
