= Qubool Hai (disambiguation) =

Qubool Hai is a 2012 Indian television series.

Qubool Hai (lit. 'I Accept', transl. I Do in Hindi-Urdu) may also refer to:

- Qubool Hai 2.0, a 2021 Indian web series, sequel to Qubool Hai
- Qubool Hai?, a 2022 Indian television series

== See also ==
- Kabul (disambiguation)
- HAI (disambiguation)
- I Do (disambiguation)
