= Battle of Kabul =

Battle of Kabul may refer to:

- Cophen campaign (327 BC–326 BC), on the Cophen or Kabul River, part of the Indian campaign of Alexander the Great
- Battle of Kabul (709), during the Islamic conquest of Afghanistan
- Siege of Kabul (1504), during the campaigns of Babur
- Stratagem of Kabul (1747), during the campaigns of Ahmad Shah
- Kabul Expedition (1842) (August–October 1842), during the First Anglo-Afghan War
- Siege of the Sherpur Cantonment (December 1879), during the Second Anglo-Afghan War
- During the Afghan Civil War (1928–1929):
  - First Battle of Kabul
  - Second Battle of Kabul
- Operation Storm 333 (December 1979), start of the Soviet-Afghan War
- Fall of Kabul (1992) (April 1992), capture of the city by the Afghan mujahideen
- Battle of Kabul (1992–96), a series of intermittent fighting and sieges in the period between the collapse of the Communist government in 1992 until the Taliban took control of the city in 1996
- Fall of Kabul (2001), when Northern Alliance forces supported by American air power captured the city in 2001
- Fall of Kabul (2021) initiated by the Taliban in August of that year as US forces withdrew from their presence of the prior two decades

== See also ==
- Fall of Kabul (disambiguation)
- Kabul (disambiguation)
