= I Do, I Do =

I Do, I Do may refer to:

- I Do! I Do! (musical), a 1966 musical by Tom Jones and Harvey Schmidt
- I Do, I Do (film), a 2005 Singaporean romantic comedy film
- I Do, I Do (TV series), a 2012 South Korean MBC romantic-comedy television drama
- A 2019 song by Park Bom
- An episode of The Jeffersons

== See also ==
- "I Do Do", an episode of the American TV series 30 Rock
- "I Do, I Do, I Do, I Do", an episode of Eight is Enough
- "I Do, I Do, I Do, I Do, I Do", a song by ABBA
- I Do (disambiguation)
