= Fall of Kabul =

Fall of Kabul may refer to these battles in Kabul, Afghanistan:

- Fall of Kabul (1992), capture of Kabul by rural Afghan coalition and fall of the Democratic Republic of Afghanistan
- Battle of Kabul (1992–1996), the capture of Kabul by the Taliban in 1996
- Fall of Kabul (2001), the capture of Kabul by the Northern Alliance in 2001, as a part of the United States invasion of Afghanistan
- Fall of Kabul (2021), the recapture of Kabul by the Taliban in 2021

== See also ==
- Kabul (disambiguation)
- Battle of Kabul (disambiguation)
