= Kabuliwallah =

Kabuliwallah ("person from Kabul") may refer to:

- Pashtun diaspora in India
- Kabuliwala (short story), an 1892 short story by Rabindranath Tagore
  - Kabuliwala (1957 film), a 1957 Indian Bengali film
  - Kabuliwala (1961 film), a 1961 Indian Hindi film
  - Kabuliwala (2006 film), a Bangladeshi film
  - Kabuliwala (2023 film) a 2023 Indian Bengali film
  - Kabuliwala, part of the television series Stories by Rabindranath Tagore
- Kabooliwala, a 1993 Indian Malayalam comedy-drama film

== See also ==
- Kabul (disambiguation)
- -wallah, suffix in Indic language denoting association
