= I Do (Rain song) =

Single by Rain

from the album It's Raining
- Released: October 8, 2004; February 16, 2005 (Japan)
- Studio: JYPE Studio
- Genre: K-pop; R&B
- Length: 3:45
- Label: JYP; King Records
- Composers: Park Jin-young; Bang Si-hyuk
- Lyricist: Park Jin-young

Rain singles chronology
| "It's Raining" (2004) | "I Do" (2004) | "Nan" (2004) |

Music video
- "I Do" (Korean ver.) on YouTube

"I Do" is a song by South Korean recording artist Rain for his third studio album, It's Raining. It was written and produced by Park Jin-young, with additional composition credits by Bang Si-hyuk. The song was first released as part of It's Raining through JYP Entertainment on October 8, 2004, serving as the record's second single following its title track "It's Raining".

== Background and release ==
After the success of the single "It's Raining", Rain released a much calmer up-tempo ballad entitled, "I Do". The lyrics talk about how he pledges to be the very best for his lover. The single became one of the singer's biggest hits throughout Asia, topping the radio broadcast chart in Thailand and ranking within the top ten in Malaysia.

The Japanese version of "I Do" was released through King Records on February 16, 2005, in support of the Japanese edition of the album. "I Do" was awarded Best Asian Pop Song at the Hito Music Awards in Taiwan in 2006.

== Music video ==
The music video for "I Do" was shot at the Paju Book Complex in Gyeonggi Province. In the music video, Rain moves from his messy room (where he apparently films a video of himself singing for his girlfriend) to the streets, passing by many loving couples. Eventually, he reaches the restaurant where his girl is waiting for him, and plucks flowers out of a nearby flower box for her bouquet before greeting her. There is also a short dance interlude. The Japanese version of the music video was released on February 16, 2005, and was included on the DVD of the Japanese edition of It's Raining.

== Live performances ==
In South Korea, Rain promoted "I Do" on several music programs including Inkigayo and Music Camp. Rain premiered the Japanese version of "I Do" at his Japanese debut showcase at Shibuya-AX on February 21, 2005, which attracted 2,000 people.

== Accolades ==
Awards
| Year | Organization | Award | Result | Ref. |
|---|---|---|---|---|
| 2006 | Hito Music Awards | Best Asian Pop Song | Won | |

Music program awards
| Program | Date |
|---|---|
| Inkigayo | December 26, 2004 |
| Music Camp | January 1, 2005 |
| Music Camp | January 8, 2005 |

== Credits and personnel ==
Credits adapted from the liner notes of It's Raining.

Recording

- Recorded at JYPE Studio, Gangnam-gu, Seoul

Personnel

- Rain – vocals
- Park Jin-young – Korean lyricist, composer, arranger
- Bang Si-hyuk – composer
- Hwang Chan-hee – background vocals

== Release history ==
| Region | Date | Version | Format | Label |
|---|---|---|---|---|
| South Korea | October 8, 2004 | Korean version | Digital download | JYP Entertainment |
| Japan | February 16, 2005 | Japanese version | Digital download | King Records |
