= Park Hyo-shin =

South Korean singer (born 1981)

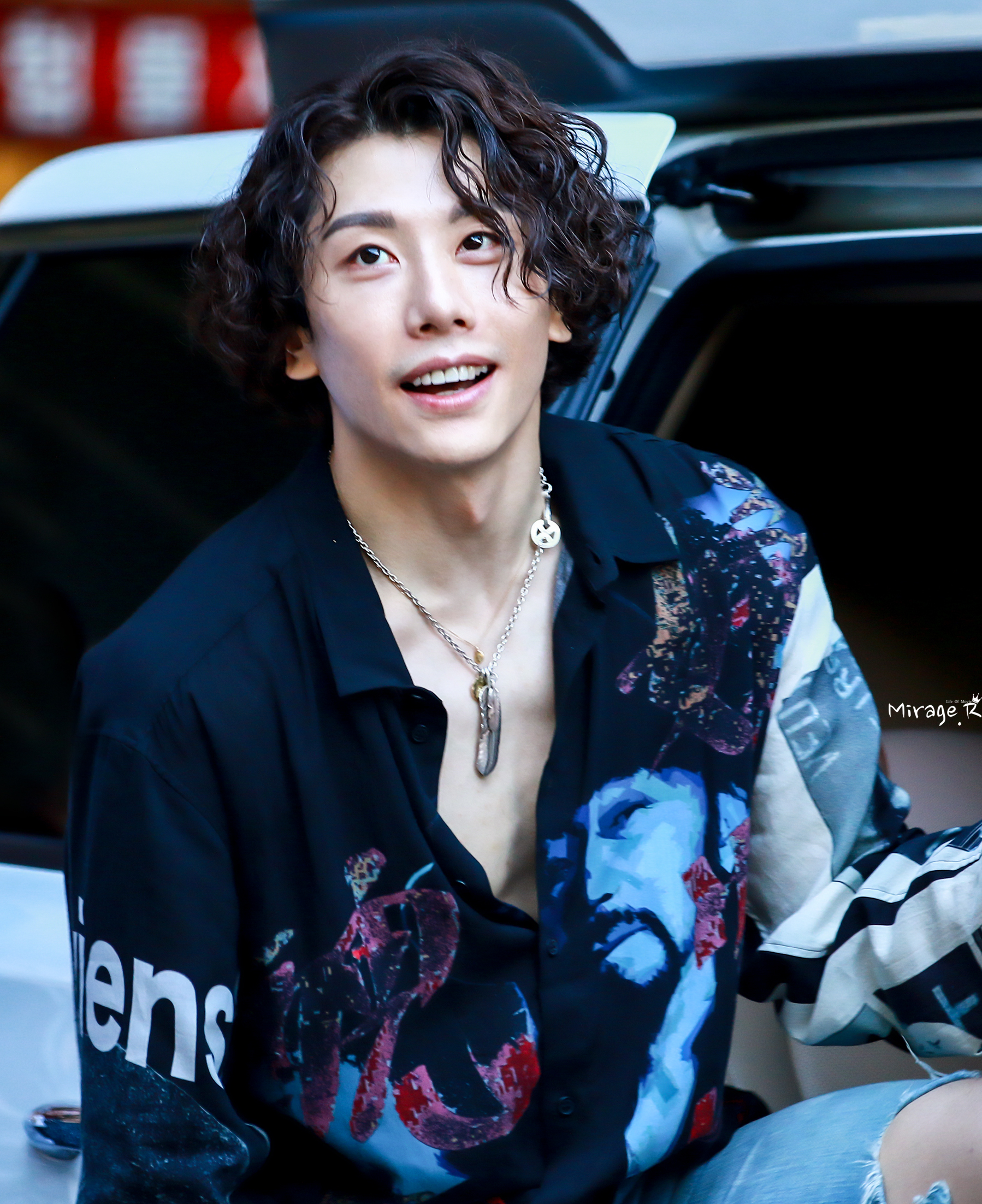
- Park in 2018

Background information
- Born: Park Hyo-shin; September 1, 1981 (age 45); Yesan, South Chungcheong, South Korea
- Genres: Korean ballad; Pop ballad
- Occupations: Singer; musical theatre actor
- Years active: 1999–present
- Label: Herbigharo
- Website: Official website

- Korean name
- Hangul: 박효신
- Hanja: 朴孝信
- RR: Bak Hyosin
- MR: Pak Hyosin

Park Hyo-shin (Korean: 박효신; born September 1, 1981) is a South Korean singer and musical theatre actor. Following his debut as a singer in 1999, Park released numerous hit songs in the 2000s, including "Good Person" (2002), "Snow Flower" (2004) and "Memories Resemble Love" (2007). In the 2010s, he achieved five number-one hits on the Circle Digital Chart, including 2014's "Wild Flower", which has sold 5 million copies, making it one of the best-selling singles in South Korea.

== Early life ==
Park Hyo-shin was born on September 1, 1981, in South Chungcheong Province, South Korea. He discovered his love of singing as a child from singing trot music at his family's restaurant. In high school, Park won prizes at several competitive singing festivals, including the grand prize at the Bucheon Youth Song Festival.

== Career ==
=== 1999–2003: Debut and early success ===
After graduating high school, Park trained to be a singer for over a year. In January 2000, he released his first album, Things I Can't Do For You (해줄 수 없는 일), which includes the lead single of the same name and the follow-up hit single "Fool" (바보). The album sold more than 446,000 copies by the end of the year and garnered Park a win for Best New Artist at the 2000 Golden Disc Awards. That year, Park made his musical theatre debut in the lead role of Rock Hamlet, which premiered in April 2000 at Seoul's Jangchung Gymnasium.

In January 2001, Park released his second album, Second Story, and its lead single, "Far Away" (먼곳에서).

He released his third album,Time Honored Voice, in September 2002. The album's lead single, "Good Person" (좋은 사람), was number one for four weeks on South Korea's Music Box Chart. For the song, Park won bonsang awards at a slew of year-end award shows, including the Golden Disc Awards and Seoul Music Awards.

=== 2004–2010: Drama soundtracks and 10th anniversary ===
Park released his fourth album, Soul Tree, in April 2004. The album topped the Recording Industry Association of Korea's monthly album chart, while the lead single, "Standing There" (그 곳에 서서), ranked number one for three weeks on the Music Box Chart. That November, Park released "Snow Flower" (눈의 꽃), a song for the original soundtrack of the television show I'm Sorry, I Love You. The song, which is a cover of "Yuki no Hana" by Japanese singer Mika Nakashima, was a hit for Park and also reportedly gave a boost to Nakashima's album sales in South Korea.

In June 2005, Park released Neo Classicism, a remake album of hit Korean songs from the 1980s and 1990s. He followed this up with the release of his fifth studio album, The Breeze of Sea, in January 2007. The album's lead single, "Memories Resembles Love" (추억은 사랑을 닮아), debuted in the top ten of weekly South Korean digital song charts and remained at the top of the charts for several months.

He not only participated in his album but was also a singer for many original soundtracks inserted in TV programs and movies. Park sang "Hwashin," or "Flower Letter", for the original soundtrack of the 2008 SBS period drama Iljimae. In 2008, he also participated in Hwang Project as the lead vocal by releasing the song "The Castle of Zoltar," which was quite different from the music that he sang in early stage of his career.

To celebrate the 10th anniversary of his debut, Park held a series of concerts, titled Park Hyo Shin's Gift from October 16 to 18, 2009 at the Olympic Fencing Gymnasium. On May 23, 2009, Park participated in "Green Concert". At the same time, he also worked on his 6th studio album. On September 15, 2009, Park released his 6th album, Gift, Part 1. The song "After Love" made it to number one on the music charts.

=== 2011–2016: Hiatus and comeback ===
Park served 21 months in Yongsan District as an entertainment soldier as part of conscription in South Korea. He finished his service in September 2012.

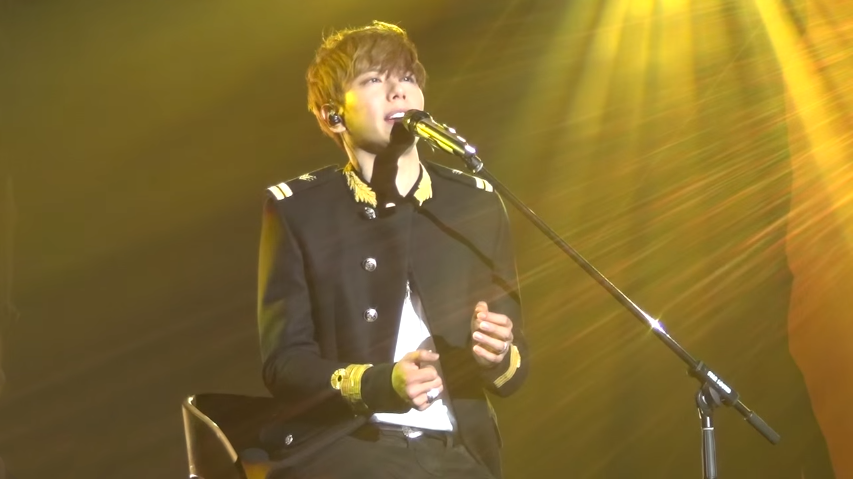
Park performing "Wild Flower" at his 15th anniversary concert in 2014.

After a four-year hiatus, Park released consecutive hit singles, all of which topped local music charts. "Wild Flower" was released in March 2014. The ballad single is about overcoming emotional turmoil through the metaphor of a resilient wildflower. It garnered the first place spot on the K-pop Hot 100, beating out Mr. Chu by Apink. The song remained on the charts long after its release, still placing 70th in March 2016. It was followed by "Happy Together" in November 2014. In April 2015, Park released the digital single "Shine Your Light".

In 2014, Park played Wolfgang Amadeus Mozart in the musical Mozart! at the Sejong Center.

Park's 2008 contract with Jellyfish Entertainment expired in 2016. On August 24, 2016, Park signed with Glove Entertainment. This move was, however, highly controversial, as Park later faced a fraud lawsuit after reportedly taking approximately 400 million KRW worth of gifts after promising to sign an exclusive contract with another company.

Under Glove Entertainment, Park released a new album in October 2016, followed by a concert titled "I Am A Dreamer" from October 8–16, 2016.

=== 2017–2021: Continued musical theatre work ===
Following the release of his 2016 album I Am a Dreamer, Park Hyo Shin shifted his primary focus to musical theatre. During this period, he took on leading roles in large-scale productions, including The Man Who Laughs and Beethoven, further establishing his reputation as a versatile stage performer. While he did not release a full-length studio album during these years, he remained active through performances and select appearances. His absence from the music charts after 2019 coincided with a period of decreased recording activity.

=== 2022–2024: Agency transition and return to recording ===
In 2022, Park Hyo Shin began managing his career under a new agency, Herbigharo, which he reportedly helped establish. This transition marked a new phase in his professional trajectory, granting him greater creative and administrative control. In late 2024, Park released the single "Hero," his first major recording release in several years. The track was positioned as a prelude to his forthcoming eighth studio album and marked a return to songwriting and arrangement involvement. That same year, he featured on the track "Winter Ahead" with BTS member V, drawing renewed attention to his musical collaborations and digital presence.

== Discography ==
- Things I Can't Do For You (1999)
- Second Story (2001)
- Time-Honored Voice (2002)
- Soul Tree (2004)
- The Breeze of Sea (2007)
- Gift, Part 1 (2009)
- Gift, Part 2 (2010)
- I Am a Dreamer (2016)

== Musical theatre ==
Year	Show	Role	Opening venue	Ref.
2000	Rock Hamlet	Hamlet	Jangchung Gymnasium	
2013	Elisabeth	Tod (Death)	Seoul Arts Center	
2014	Mozart!	Mozart	Sejong Center	
2015	Phantom	Erik	Chungmu Art Hall	
2016–2017	Phantom	Erik	Blue Square Samsung Electronics Hall	
2018	The Man Who Laughs	Gwynplaine	Seoul Arts Center	
2022	The Man Who Laughs	Gwynplaine	Sejong Center for the Performing Arts	
2023	Beethoven	Beethoven	Seoul Arts Center Opera House	
2023	Beethoven Season2	Beethoven	Sejong Center	

== Awards and nominations ==
Year	Award	Category	Nominee or nominated work	Result	Ref.
2000	Golden Disc Awards	Best New Artist	"Things I Can't Do For You" (해줄 수 없는 일)	Won	
2000	Mnet Asian Music Awards	Best New Male Artist	"Things I Can't Do For You" (해줄 수 없는 일)	Nominated	
2002	Mnet Asian Music Awards	Best Ballad Performance	"Good Person" (좋은 사람)	Nominated	
2002	Golden Disc Awards	Main Prize (Bonsang)	"Good Person" (좋은 사람)	Won	
2002	Seoul Music Awards	Main Prize (Bonsang)	"Good Person" (좋은 사람)	Won	
2002	KBS Music Awards	Main Prize (Bonsang)	Park Hyo-shin	Won	
2002	SBS Gayo Daejeon	Main Prize (Bonsang)	Park Hyo-shin	Won	
2002	KMTV Korean Music Awards	Singer of the Year (Bonsang)	Park Hyo-shin	Won	
2004	KBS Music Awards	Main Prize (Bonsang)	Park Hyo-shin	Won	
2004	SBS Gayo Daejeon	Main Prize (Bonsang)	Park Hyo-shin	Won	
2004	Seoul Music Awards	Main Prize (Bonsang)	Park Hyo-shin	Won	
2004	Mnet Asian Music Awards	Best Ballad Video	"Standing There" (그 곳에 서서)	Nominated	
2007	Mnet Asian Music Awards	Best Male Artist	"Memories Resemble Love" (추억은 사랑을 닮아)	Nominated	
2009	Cyworld Digital Music Awards	Hall of Fame Award	"Snow Flower" (눈의 꽃)	Won	
2009	Mnet Asian Music Awards	Best Ballad/R&B Performance	"After Love" (사랑한 후에 )	Nominated	
2012	Cable TV Awards	Cable TV Star Award	Consolation Train (위문열차)	Won	
2014	Melon Music Awards	Song of the Year	"Wild Flower" (야생화)	Nominated	
2014	Melon Music Awards	Best Ballad	"Wild Flower" (야생화)	Nominated	
2016	Mnet Asian Music Awards	Best Male Artist	"Breath" (숨)	Nominated	
2017	Melon Music Awards	Stage of the Year	Park Hyo-shin	Won	
2018	Mnet Asian Music Awards	Best Male Artist	"The Sound of Winter" (겨울소리)	Nominated	
2018	Mnet Asian Music Awards	Best Vocal Performance - Solo	"The Sound of Winter" (겨울소리)	Nominated	
2018	Mnet Asian Music Awards	Best OST	"The Day" (그 날) from Mr. Sunshine	Nominated	
2018	Yegreen Musical Awards	Best Actor	The Man Who Laughs (웃는남자)	Won	
2019	Korea Musical Awards	Best Actor	The Man Who Laughs (웃는남자)	Won	
2019	Mnet Asian Music Awards	Best Male Artist	"Goodbye"	Nominated	

== Military honors ==
During his mandatory military service, Park received both the Army Chief of Staff's award and the Minister of National Defense Award.
