= 2004 Mnet KM Music Video Festival =

6th edition of the MAMA Awards held in 2004

- Date: December 4, 2004
- Location: Kyung Hee University, Seoul, South Korea
- Hosted by: Shin Dong-yup and Kim Jung-eun
- Most awards: Shinhwa (2)
- Most nominations: Rain and BoA (3)
- Website: Mnet KM Music Video Festival

Television/radio coverage
- Network: Mnet (South Korea); Mnet Japan (Japan)
- Runtime: Approximately 200 minutes

The 2004 Mnet KM Music Video Festival (MKMF) took place on December 4, 2004 at Kyung Hee University in Seoul, South Korea. The ceremony was hosted by comedian Shin Dong-yup and actress Kim Jung-eun. Soloists Rain and BoA were the most nominated artists with three nominations each, while boyband Shinhwa had the most wins with two.

== Background ==
The award ceremony, previously known as the Mnet Music Video Festival, merged with the KMTV Korean Music Awards and was as Mnet KM Music Video Festival (MKMF). The Grand Prize (Daesang) were the Best Popular Music Video Award and Music Video of the Year. For the second time, the event took place at the Kyung Hee University. Shin Dong-yup and Kim Jung-eun hosted the event. The category of Best OST was introduced for the first time. Three international artists performed in including Jerry Yan, becoming the first Taiwanese singer to perform in the ceremony.

== Performers ==
Artist(s)	Song(s)	Notes
BoA (ft. M-Flo)	"My Name", "Spark", "The Love Bug"	"Beat Of Asia" – Opening of the show
Seven (ft. Jinusean)	"Passion", "Crazy", "Crazy remix"	"7th Street"
Shinhwa	"Brand New", "Red Sunset", "Rain On A Sleepless Night", "Made For Each Other"	"Shinhwa Rewind"
Ock Joo-hyun, Bada, and Mario Lee (리 마리오)	"Let's Get Loud"	"Club Divas"
Cho PD, Insooni, Kim E-Z, Shin Ji	"My Friend"	"Club Divas"
Gummy, Wheesung	"Loss Of Memory", "Incurable Disease", "911"	"Soulmate"
Jerry Yan (ft. Shin Seung-hun)	"One Meter" and "I Believe"	"Best Asia Pop Artist"
TVXQ (ft. BoA and TraxX)	"Magic Castle", "Hug", "Tri-Angle"	Best New Group award
Rain	"Billie Jean", "U Can't Touch This", "It's Raining"	"Rain Time"
Shinhwa, Cho PD, Lee Hyun-do (D.O.)	"Woo-Ri-Neun", "Break Of The Yolk", "Look Back At Me", "Hip Hop Rescue Team"	"Deux Forever... And You Don't Stop" – Deux tribute
Gackt	"December Love Song", "Another World"	"Best Asia Rock Artist"
BoA	"My Name"	Closing remarks (Music Video of the Year awardee)

== Presenters ==
2004 Mnet KM Music Video Festival hosts

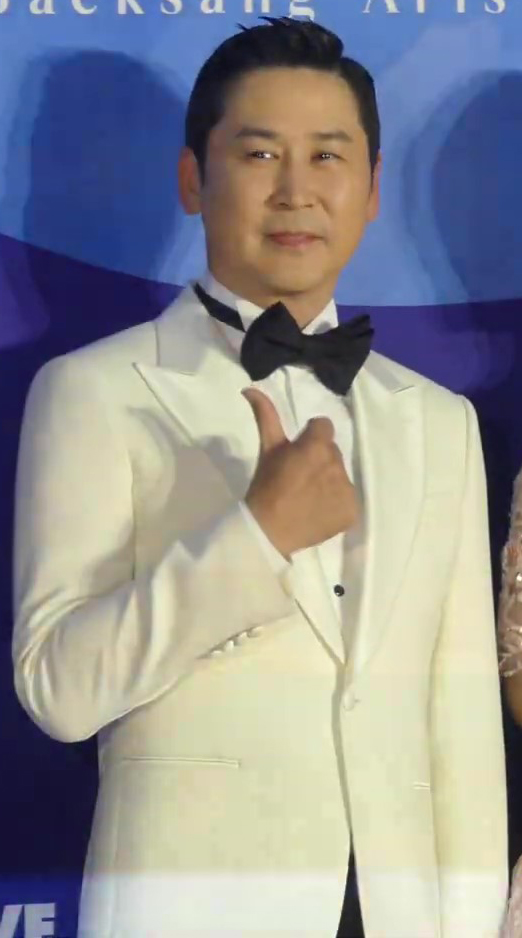
Shin Dong-yup

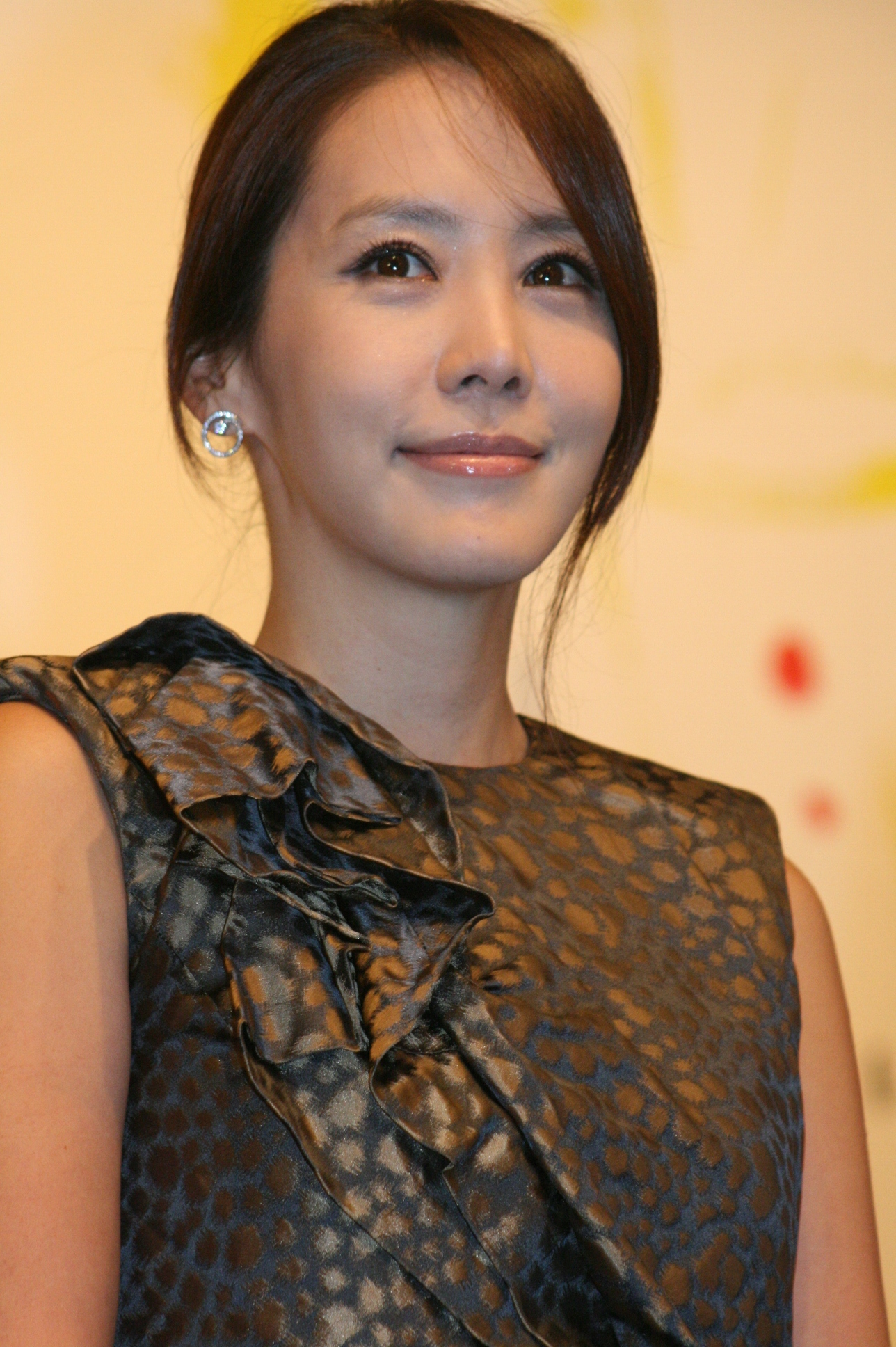
Kim Jung-eun

Name(s)	Role
Shin Dong-yup and Kim Jung-eun	Main hosts of the show
Lee Hyori	Introduced the criteria for judging (VTR)
Lee Se-young and SE7EN	Presenters for the award for Best New Male Video
Jo Jeong-rim (조정린) and Kim Dong-youn (김동윤)	Presenters for the award for Best New Female Video
–	Presenters for the award for Best New Group Video
Kim Diena (김디에나)	Introduced Seven's performance
Lee Wan and Han Ye-seul	Presenters for the award for Best Hip Hop Video
Jo PD	Presenter for the special award for Best Asia Hip Hop Artist
VJ Dr. 노 and Oh Hui-jong (오희종)	Presenters for the special award for Mobile Popularity Award
Kim Sung-soo and Han Eun-jung	Presenters for the award for Best Director
Yi Yeok-jae (이혁재) and Kang Soyoung (강소영)	Presenters for the award for Best Male Group Video
정찬우 Jeong Chan-woo and Kim Tae-kyun	Presenters for the award for Best Female Group Video
Sin-I (신이) and Jeong Jun-ha	Presenters for the award for Best Group Video
Eric Mun and Shin Ae	Presenters for the award for Best OST
Nam Hui-seok (남희석) and Oh Seung-heon (오승환)	Presenters for the award for Best R&B Video
Park Eun-hye	Introduced Jerry Yan's performance
Baek Yoon-sik and Kim Jong-min	Presenters for the award for Blue Award
Soi (소이)	Presenter for the award for Overseas Viewers' Award
Nam Sang-mi and Gong Yoo	Presenters for the award for Best Ballad Video
Han Go-eun and Psy	Presenters for the award for Best Dance Video
Mun Dae-seong (문대성) and Hyun Young	Presenters for the award for Best Rock Video
Kim Min (김민)	Presenter for the special award for Mnet PD's Choice Award
Yum Jung-ah and Ji Jin-hee	Presenters for the award for Best Female Video
Lee Dong-gun and Han Ji-hye	Presenters for the award for Best Male Video
An Heung-chan (안흥찬)	Introduced the performance of Gackt
Song Young-han (송영한)	Presenter for the award for Most Popular Music Video
Park Chan-wook and Moon So-ri	Presented/handed the award for Music Video of the Year
No Jae-myeong (노재명)	Presented/handed the award for Music Video of the Year

== Selection process ==
The following criteria for winners include:

Music preference	30%
Mobile Internet/Viewers' vote	30%
Video professionals and panel of judges	30%
Nominations Selection Committee (consisting of M.net and KMTV Producers)	10%
Total	100%

== Winners and nominees ==
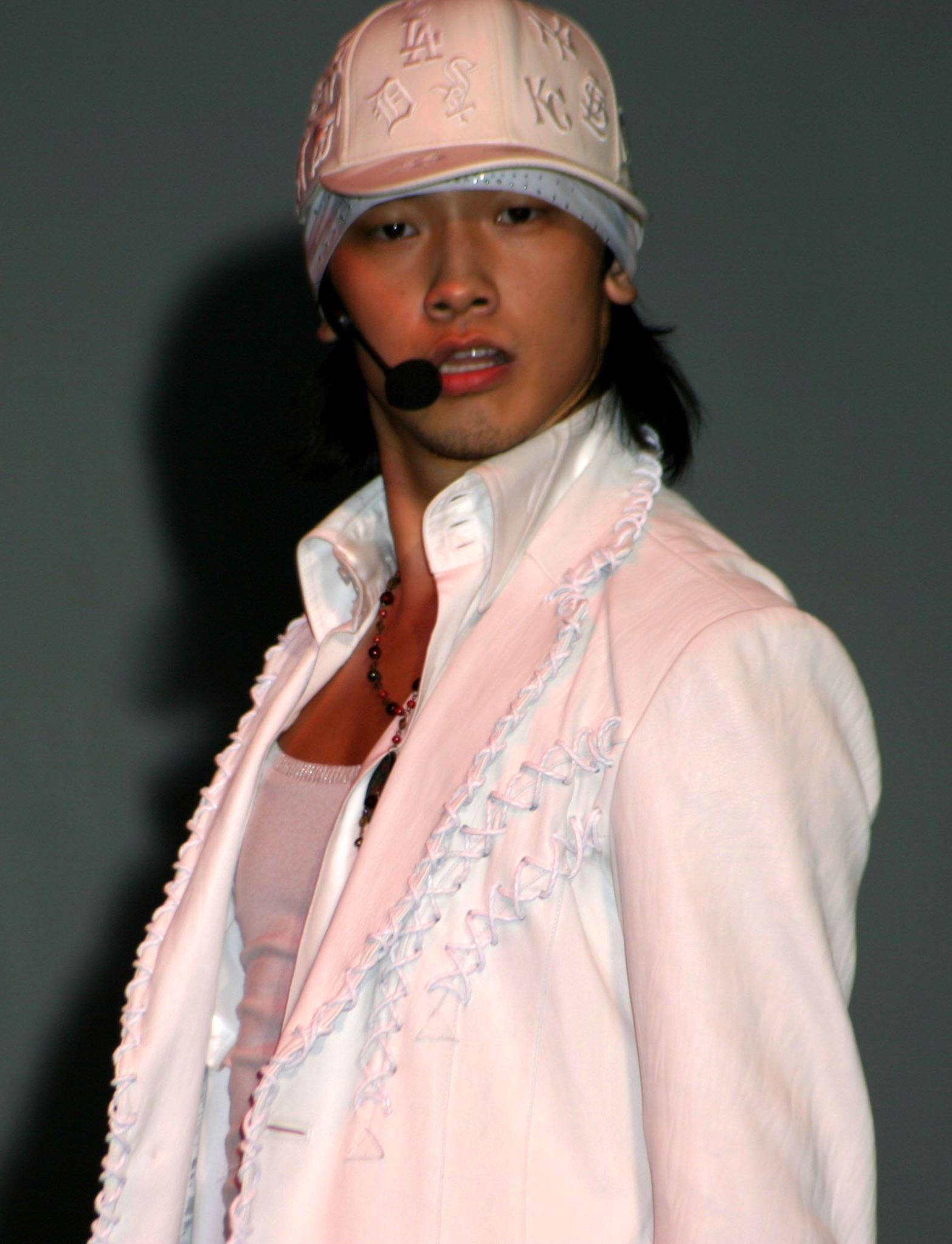
Rain won Most Popular Music Video

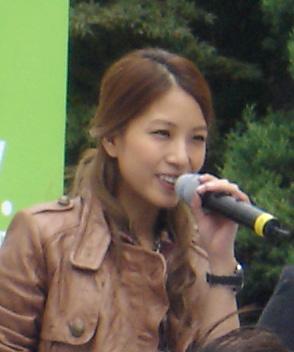
BoA won Music Video of the Year

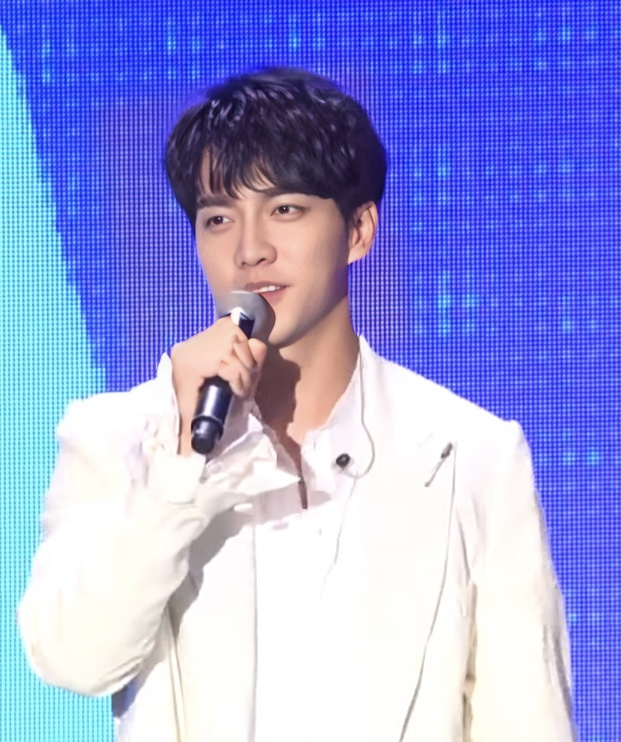
Lee Seung-gi won Best New Male Video

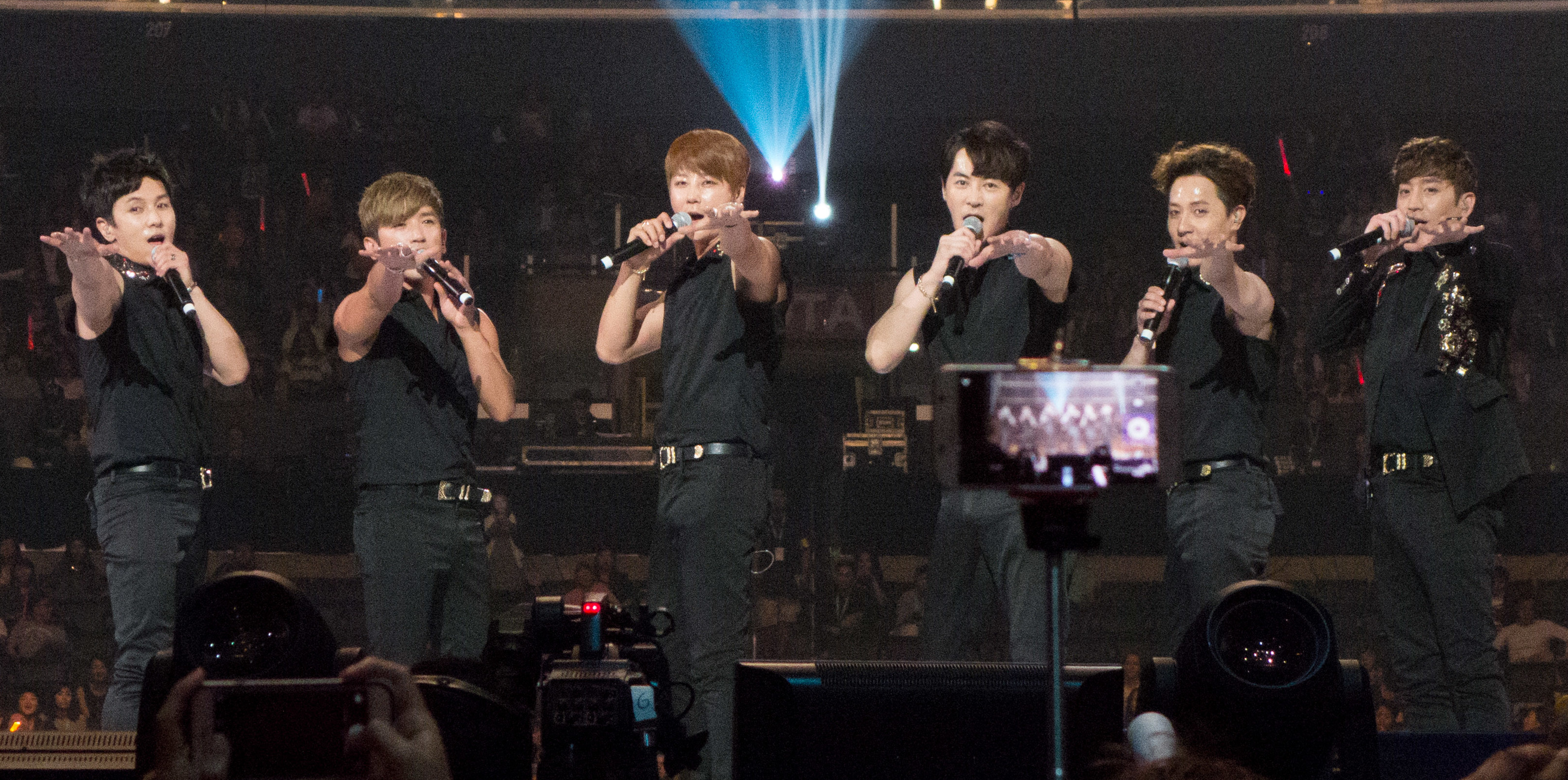
Shinhwa won Best Male Group, Best Dance Video, and Overseas Viewers' Award

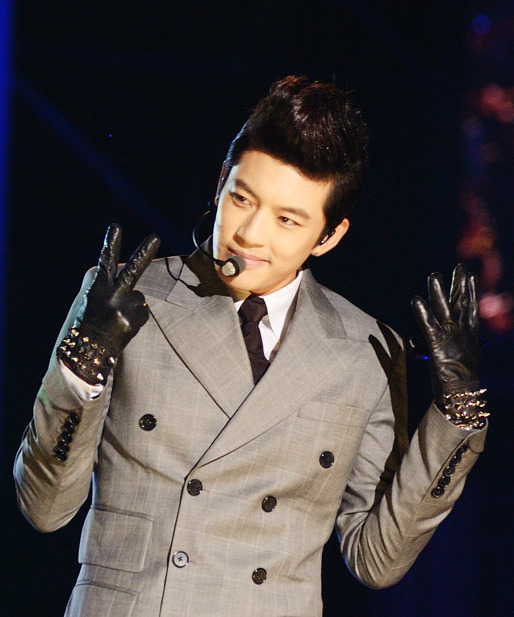
Seven won Best Male Video

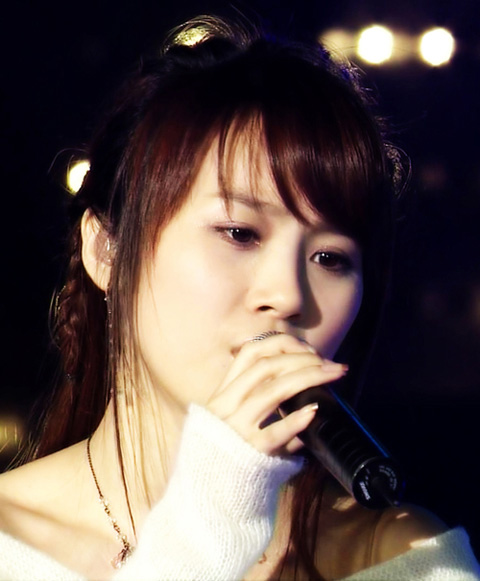
Lee Soo-young won Best Female Video

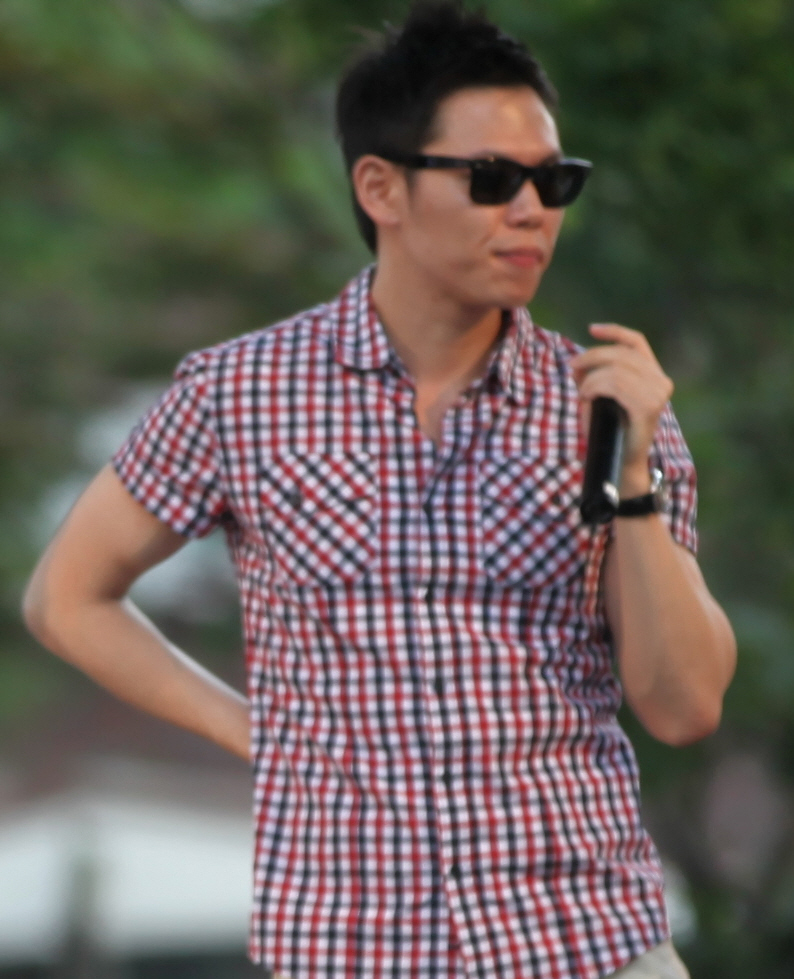
Jo PD won Best Hip Hop Video

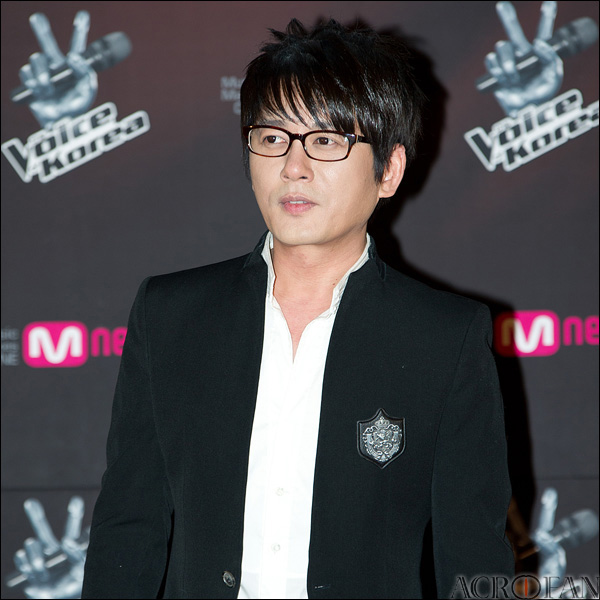
Shin Seung-hun won Best Ballad Video

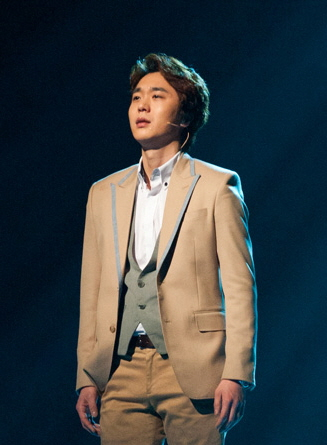
Jo Sungmo won Best OST

Usher won Best International Artist

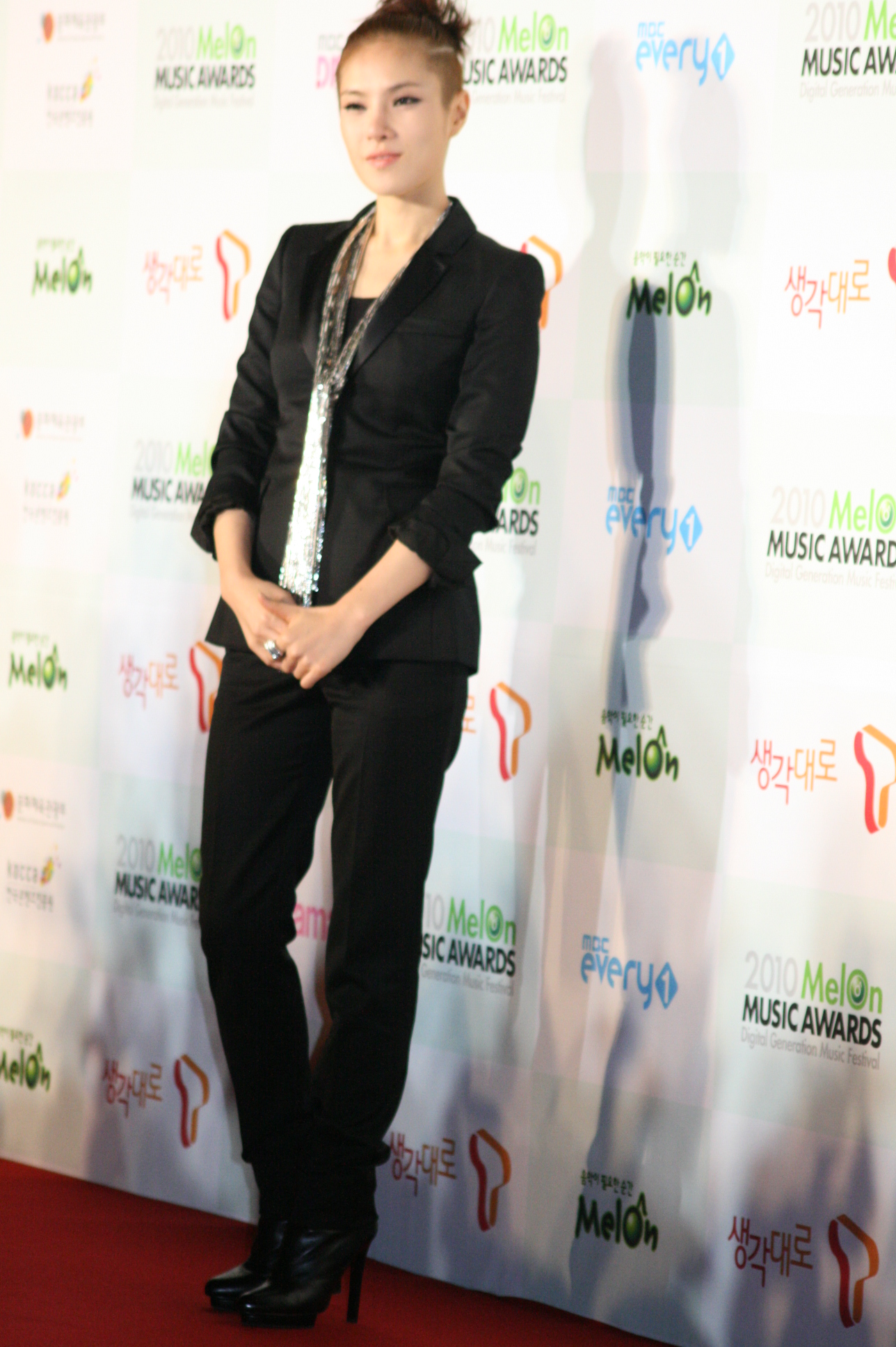
Gummy won Mobile Popularity Award

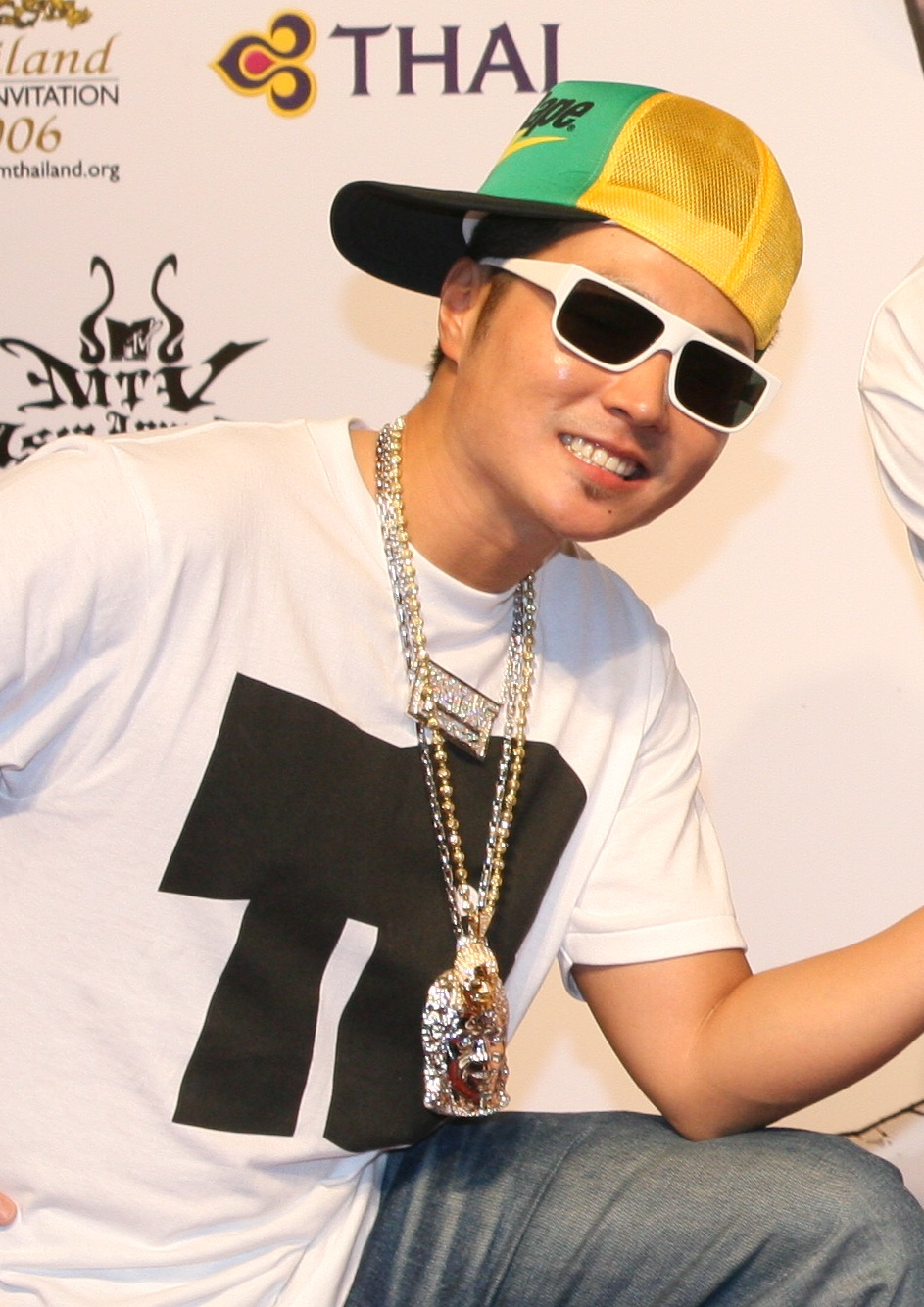
M-Flo won Best Asia Hip Hop Artist

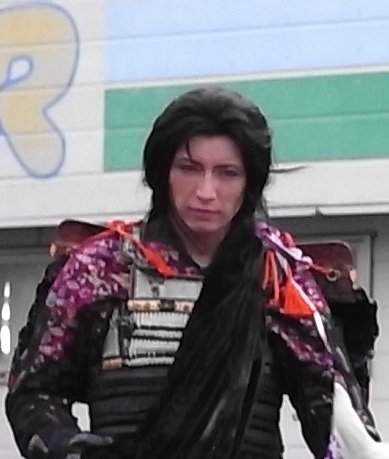
Gackt won Best Asia Rock Artist

Winners are listed first and highlighted in boldface.

Most Popular Music Video (Daesang)	Music Video of the Year (Daesang)
**Rain – "It's Raining"**	**BoA – "My Name"**
Best New Male Video	Best New Female Video
**Lee Seung-gi – "Because You're My Woman"**; Double K – "Nu Skool"; Oh Se-jun – "Memories That End In Me"; KCM – "Black And White Photo"; Tei – "Love Leaves Its Scent"	**Chunja – "Women with Beautiful Mind"**; Daylight – "Angel Song"; Lisa – "Tonight"; Sol Flower – "Kiss The Kids"; Hannah – "Bounce"
Best New Group Video	Best Group Video
**TVXQ – "Hug"**; Buzz – "Monologue"; SG Wannabe – "Timeless"; Wanted- "Reaction"; Clazziquai Project – "Sweety"	**Koyote – "Disco King"**; Turtles – "Come On"; Loveholics – "Sky"; Jaurim – "Hahaha Song"; Cool – "Find A Friend"
Best Male Group Video	Best Female Group Video
**Shinhwa – "Angel"**; DJ DOC – "One Night"; NRG – "Hurray For A Virile Son Of Korea"; MC the Max – "Love Poem"; 1TYM – "Hot"	**Sugar – "Secret"**; Diva – "Hey Boy"; Baby Vox – "Xcstasy"; Cleo – "In&Out"
Best Male Video	Best Female Video
**Seven – "Passion"**; Rain – "It's Raining"; Seo Taiji – "Robot"; MC Mong – "180°"; Wheesung – "Incurable Disease"	**Lee Soo-young – "Whistle to Me"**; Gummy – "Loss Of Memory"; BoA – "My Name"; Eugene – "Windy"; Jang Na-ra – "Is That True?
Best R&B Video	Best Rock Video
**Wheesung – "Incurable Illness"**; Gummy – "Loss Of Memory"; Lyn – "Used To Love"; Vibe – "As I'm Getting Older"; SG Wannabe – "Timeless"	**Seo Taiji – "Live Wire"**; N.E.X.T – "Growing Up"; TraxX – "Paradox"; Moon Hee-joon – "Paper Airplane"; Jaurim – "Hahaha Song"
Best Hip Hop Video	Best Director
**Jo PD – "Friend" (ft. In Sooni)**; Dynamic Duo – "Ring My Bell"; Drunken Tiger – "Liquor Shots"; Epik High – "Peace Day"; MP Allstarz – "Change The Game"	**Cha Eun-taek** – "Timeless", "Because You're My Woman", "When That Day Comes"; Seo Hyeon-seung; Yi Jun-hyeong; Jang Jae-hyuk; Jo Suh-yeon
Best Dance Video	Best Ballad Video
**Shinhwa – "Brand New"**; TVXQ – "The Way U Are"; BoA – "My Name"; Rain – "It's Raining"; Seven – "Passion"	**Shin Seung-hun – "When That Day Comes"**; Kim Jong-kook – "One Man"; Park Hyo-shin – "Standing There"; Lee Soo-young – "Whistle To Me"; Lee Seung-chul – "The Livelong Day"
Best OST	Best International Artist
**Jo Sungmo – "By Your Side" (Lovers in Paris)**; Moon Geun-young – "I Don't Know About Love Yet" (My Little Bride); Lee Seung-chul – "Fate" (Phoenix); Cho Eun – "Can't It Be" (Something Happened in Bali); Han Ye-seul – "You Are Different" (Nonstop 4)	**Usher – "Yeah!"**

=== Special awards ===
- Best Asia Hip Hop Artist: **M-Flo**
- Mobile Popularity Award: **Gummy – "Memory Loss" (기억상실)**
- Judges Choice Awards: **Kim Yoon-ah – "Nocturne" (야상곡)**
- Best Asia Pop Artist: **Jerry Yan**
- Blue Award: **Moon Hee-joon – "Paper Airplane"**
- Overseas Viewers' Award: **Shinhwa – "Brand New"**
- Mnet PD's Choice Award: **Deux** (posthumous award for Kim Sung Jae)
- Best Asia Pop Artist: **Gackt**

== Multiple nominations and awards ==
=== Artist(s) with multiple wins ===
The following artist(s) received two or more wins (excluding the special awards):

Awards	Artist(s)
2	Shinhwa

=== Artist(s) with multiple nominations ===
The following artist(s) received two or more nominations:

Nominations	Artist(s)
3	Rain
3	BoA
2	TVXQ
2	SG Wannabe
2	Jaurim
2	Shinhwa
2	Seven
2	Wheesung
2	Seo Taiji
2	Lee Soo-young
2	Gummy
2	Lee Seung-chul
