= I Do Now I Don't =

E-commerce website marketing previously owned jewelry

- Industry: Jewelry
- Founder: Joshua Opperman; Mara Opperman
- Headquarters: New York City, United States
- Services: Markets previously owned jewelry
- Website: www.idonowidont.com

I Do Now I Don't (also abbreviated IDNID) is an e-commerce website that markets previously owned jewelry, primarily diamond engagement rings, as well as other items such as bridesmaid dresses through fixed-price and auction sales.

== History ==
I Do Now I Don't was founded by Joshua Opperman and his sister Mara in 2007, as a peer-to-peer platform for selling expensive engagement and wedding rings that are no longer wanted. Opperman says he had the idea after returning home one day to find that his fiancée of three months and all of her belongings, aside from the ring, were gone; when he tried to return the ring to the retailer, he received a buyback estimate that was about a third of the purchase price. Jewelry on IDNID is typically priced higher than retailer buyback offers but up to 50% below appraisal value.

One of the earliest entrants in the online secondhand jewelry market, IDNID became successful quickly, in part due to increased sales during the Great Recession. In 2015, the company merged with DELGATTO. About 1.7 million used engagement and wedding rings with a combined retail value of $4.2 billion are offered for sale annually.

IDNID follows a new economic model called the sharing economy, a decentralized model whereby buyers and sellers interact directly with each other, without intermediation by a third party except to facilitate the transaction. IDNID provides a platform for buyers and sellers to connect, along with tools and resources such as escrow funds and third-party authentication services.

The site has received positive mention from e-commerce analysts for its approach to repurposing a pricey commodity that is often considered “taboo”.

I Do Now I Don't has been featured on such programs as The Rachael Ray Show, CNN, The Glenn Beck Show, Wake Up with Whoopi and The Today Show.
