= Bad Guy (album) =

Bad Man

Studio album by Rain
- Released: May 13, 2002
- Recorded: 2001–2002
- Genres: K-pop; R&B
- Length: 38:38
- Label: JYP Entertainment
- Producers: Park Jin-young; Bang Si-hyuk; Bae Jin-ryeol (JR Groove)

Rain chronology
Bad Man (2002)	How To Avoid The Sun (2003)

Singles from Bad Man
- 1. "Bad Man" Released: May 13, 2002; 2. "Handshake" Released: May 13, 2002; 3. "Instead of Saying Goodbye" Released: September 2002

Bad Man (Korean: 나쁜 남자; RR: Nappeun Namja), alternately titled N001, is the debut studio album by South Korean pop and R&B singer Rain, released via JYP Entertainment on May 13, 2002. The album was the 45th best-selling album of the year with over 138,000 copies sold. It won Rain various newcomer awards including at the MAMA Awards, Golden Disc Awards and Seoul Music Awards.

== Commercial performance ==
Commercially, Bad Man achieved moderate levels of success in South Korea in terms of sales, where it debuted at number 19 on the monthly album chart for May 2002 with 20,800 copies sold. It rose to a peak of number 9 in August, with total sales of 68,445 copies since its release. On the year-end chart issue for 2002, Bad Guy ranked as the 45th best-selling album of the year with 138,125 copies in sales. The figure rose to 143,414 copies by January of the following year.

== Accolades ==
Awards and nominations
Year	Ceremony	Category	Result	Ref.
2002	Golden Disc Awards	Best New Artist	Won	
2002	Mnet Music Video Festival	Best New Artist – Male Solo	Won	
2002	Seoul Music Awards	Rookie of the Year	Won	

Music program awards
Song	Program	Date
"Instead of Saying Goodbye"	SBS's Inkigayo	October 6, 2002

== Track listing ==
Bad Man track listing
No.	Title	Lyrics	Music	Length
1.	"Rain" (雨)	Bae Jin-ryeol	Bae Jin-ryeol (JR Groove)	1:44
2.	"Handshake" (악수)	Park Jin-young	Park Jin-young	3:01
3.	"Bad Man" (나쁜 남자)	Park Jin-young	Park Jin-young; Bang Si-hyuk	3:37
4.	"Me" (나)	Park Jin-young	Park Jin-young; Bang Si-hyuk	3:23
5.	"Can't Get Used To It" (익숙치 않아서)	Park Jin-young	Park Jin-young	4:40
6.	"Baby Baby"	Park Jin-young	Park Jin-young; Bae Jin Ryeol	3:44
7.	"Instead of Saying Goodbye" (안녕이란 말 대신)	Park Jin-young	Park Jin-young	3:40
8.	"Like You (feat. Bada)" (너처럼)	Bada	Bang Si-hyuk; Bada	4:17
9.	"Am I Not Good Enough (feat. Hoony Hoon, Huh In-chang)" (나론 안되니)	Park Jin-young; Hoony Hoon	Park Jin-young; Bang Si-hyuk	3:43
10.	"Why" (왜)	Park Jin-young; Kim Gi-jeong; Tina Kim; Lee Hyun-ah; Lee Cho-rong	Park Jin-young	3:09
11.	"What's Love (feat. Danny, Lexy, Byul, and JYP)"	Park Jin-young; Danny Ahn	Danny Ahn	3:40
Total length:				38:38

== Charts ==
=== Monthly charts ===
Chart (August 2002)	Peak position
South Korean Albums (RIAK)	9

=== Year-end charts ===
Chart (2002)	Position
South Korean Albums (RIAK)	45
