= Kabolabad =

Kabolabad كابل اباد
- Village
- Location within Iran
- Coordinates: 39°09′07″N 47°02′54″E
- Country: Iran
- Province: East Azerbaijan
- County: Khoda Afarin
- Bakhsh: Central
- Rural District: Keyvan

Population (2006)
  - Total: 73
- Time zone: UTC+3:30 (IRST)
  - Summer (DST): UTC+4:30 (IRDT)

Kabolabad (Persian: كابل اباد, also Romanized as Kābolābād and Kāblābād; also known as Kābol) is a village in Keyvan Rural District, in the Central District of Khoda Afarin County, East Azerbaijan Province, Iran. At the 2006 census, its population was 73, in 21 families.
