= It's Raining (Rain song) =

Single by Rain

from the album It's Raining
- Released: October 8, 2004
- Recorded: 2004
- Studio: JYPE Studio
- Genre: K-pop
- Length: 3:40
- Label: JYP
- Songwriter: Park Jin-young
- Producers: Park Jin-young; Kwon Tae-eun

Rain singles chronology
"You Already Knew" (2003)	"It's Raining" (2004)	"I Do" (2004)

"It's Raining" is a song by South Korean singer Rain, taken from his third Korean-language studio album of the same name (2004). It was released on October 8, 2004, in conjunction with the album, and was written and produced by Park Jin-young with additional arrangement credits by Kwon Tae-eun. It explores a more upbeat, hip-hop influenced sound in contrast to his previous releases.

Upon its release, the song was met with commercial success, and topped various domestic charts. It won the Most Popular Music Video daesang award at the 2004 Mnet Km Music Video Festival and the Grand Prize at the annual KBS Music Awards.

== Background and composition ==
In an attempt to attract a larger international audience, he changed his name from Bi (meaning 'rain' in Korean) to its English form, Rain. This was also Rain's first single with an English name, rather than a Korean one. The single eventually made its way to the MTV studios in 2006. Its video was played periodically on MTV (USA) to promote Rain’s first ever US concert, Rainy Day, in Madison Square Garden.

Musically, "It's Raining" is a dance song that utilizes hip hop beats and elements of techno. Regarding the meaning of the song's title, it does not mean in the literal sense "It's raining", but rather "Rain is performing", conveying "the thrill and excitement that Rain feels on stage". The song's musical styles was contrasted with his single "How to Avoid the Sun" (2003), which attracted fans with its emotional R&B.

== Reception and impact ==
The song experienced commercial success in South Korea; Billboard said that "Rain rose to prominence as a soloist shortly after he released his first album Bad Guy in 2002 and saw major success with singles like 2004's 'It's Raining' and 2008's 'Rainism.'" Writing for Tidal magazine, Jeff Benjamin regarded it as a key track that represented K-pop's sonic and artistic growth, saying that while the country was still reforming following the Asian financial crisis in the late-1990s, "soloists such as Rain and BoA not only thrived as chart-toppers domestically but also made some of K-pop's first significant moves overseas."

In 2014, music webzine Music Y ranked "It's Raining" number 31 in their list of 120 greatest dance tracks of all-time, writing that "From the breath-taking intro and heart pulsating sound to the bass beats, ...「It's Raining」has been successful in implanting its charisma into the rhythmic composition itself, and has been praised by DJs of the time as a world-class club tune." In 2021, the song was ranked as the 72nd greatest K-pop song of all time by Melon and newspaper Seoul Shinmun, with music critic Kim Young-dae writing that the song "is a representative work that reveals Rain's aspiration and confidence, who began to cross Asia and North America beyond Korea." He noted its simple yet hypnotic repeating groove and the presence of the vocals which draws out the charm of the song.

== Accolades ==
Awards and nominations for "It's Raining"
Year	Organization	Award	Result	Ref.
2004	KBS Music Awards	Grand Prize (Daesang)	Won	
2004	Mnet KM Music Video Festival	Most Popular Music Video (Daesang)	Won	
2004	Mnet KM Music Video Festival	Best Male Video	Nominated	
2004	Mnet KM Music Video Festival	Best Dance Video	Nominated	
2004	Sports Korea Awards	Song of the Year	2nd place	
2005	MTV Video Music Awards Japan	Best Buzz Asia – Korea	Won	

Music program awards
Program	Date
M Countdown	November 4, 2004
M Countdown	November 11, 2004
Inkigayo	November 7, 2004
Inkigayo	November 21, 2004
Inkigayo	November 28, 2004
Music Camp	November 13, 2004
Music Camp	November 20, 2004

== Music video and live performances ==
In the music video for "It's Raining", it opens with motorbikes and helicopters surrounding a trailer truck in the rain. Surrounded by exploding flashes, Rain takes off on stage, leaving behind the DJ's voice shouting "Rain is back!" He is delivered to a night club for a live performance by his entourage, bringing some life to the previously dull atmosphere. Towards the end of the song, rain starts to pour from the ceiling. Parts of the video appear to have been shot in front of fans. On the music video, a voice of a woman is heard saying "Rain, Go Rain!, It's Raining, It's Raining".

Rain performed the song for the first time at the album's showcase event on October 8, 2004 at the Dome Art Hall at Children's Grand Park in Neung-dong, Seoul. He subsequently performed it live on Music Camp for the first time on October 9 and on Inkigayo the next day. On December 4, Rain performed it at the 2004 Mnet Km Music Video Festival, along with cover performances of Michael Jackson's "Billie Jean" and MC Hammer's "U Can't Touch This". On February 3, 2005, Rain made a performance with the song at the MTV Asia Aid 2005 in Bangkok, where he won the award for favorite Korean artist. He further performed the song at the 2008 Mnet Km Music Festival and the 2013 Mnet Asian Music Awards, the latter was his first performance on live television after serving in the military. He also performed it at the 31st Golden Disc Awards on January 14, 2017, along with "Rainism".

== Credits and personnel ==
Credits adapted from the liner notes of It's Raining.

Recording

- Recorded at JYPE Studio, Gangnam-gu, Seoul

Personnel

- Rain – vocals
- Park Jin-young – lyricist, composer, arranger, background vocals
- Kwon Tae-eun – producer
- Kwon Dae-ri – track mixer
- Pat Viala – vocal mixer

== Release history ==
Region	Date	Format	Label
South Korea	October 8, 2004	Digital download	JYP Entertainment
