= Rain 2 =

Studio album by Rain
- Released: October 16, 2003
- Recorded: 2003
- Studio: JYPE Studio (Seoul)
- Genres: Pop; R&B
- Length: 42:37
- Language: Korean
- Label: JYP
- Producers: Park Jin-young; Bang Si-hyuk; Lunchsong Project; JR Groove; Woo Eun-jeung; Kim Do-hoon; Kim Mi-sun

Rain chronology
Bad Guy (2002)	Rain 2 (2003)	It's Raining (2004)

Alternative cover
- Japanese edition cover

Singles from How to Avoid the Sun
- 1. "How to Avoid the Sun" Released: October 16, 2003; 2. "You Already Knew" Released: October 16, 2003

Rain 2 (Korean: 태양을 피하는 방법; RR: Taeyang-eul pihaneun bangbeob), alternately titled How to Avoid the Sun, (Note: Other alternate titles include How to Run From the Sun and Ways to Avoid the Sun) is the second Korean-language studio album by South Korean recording artist Rain, released through JYP Entertainment on October 16, 2003. It spawned two singles: the titular track "How to Avoid the Sun" and "You Already Knew". A R&B and pop album, Rain 2 was primarily written and produced by JYP founder Park Jin-young, Bang Si-hyuk, along with several other contributors.

Commercially, the album peaked at number six on the monthly album charts in South Korea and was the 19th best-selling album of 2003, selling over 127,000 copies. It sold over 166,000 copies by the end of the following year. The title track received seven first place music program awards in South Korea and won a Mobile Popularity Award at the 2003 Mnet Music Video Festival.

== Background and composition ==
Rain 2 (Korean: 태양을 피하는 방법) is also referred to as How to Avoid the Sun or How to Run From the Sun. The single "How to Avoid the Sun" is about a person who still harbors feelings for a previous lover, using the sun as a metaphor to convey how the person is unable to stop thinking about them. The lyrics and music video express how the sun is omnipresent and cannot be avoided even if you hide underground or cover it with the palm of your hand.

== Singles ==
"How to Avoid the Sun" was released as the first single. The single put Rain on the map in Korea, going to number one on the charts. At the time of the album's release, there were two versions of the song: the radio mix, credited as the guitar remix, and the original version. The song lyrics describe feeling a love so strong that it is impossible to run from. The music video was shot in Seoul. In it, you see Rain running from the sun throughout the city, trying his best to avoid it, but always failing.

On the May 10, 2007, episode of the Colbert Report, Stephen Colbert presented his audience with a parody of the "Ways to Avoid the Sun" music video. The parody featured Colbert singing in Korean and mimicking elements from the Rain video including running from the sun and dancing in a parking garage. The video was created in response to Rain topping Colbert in Time's open online poll. "You Already Knew" was released as a promotional single as a follow-up to "How to Avoid the Sun".

== Reception ==
From October 2003 to February 2004, the album sold 166,731 copies in South Korea. In 2021, "How to Avoid the Sun" was ranked at number 62 in Melon and newspaper Seoul Shinmun's list of top 100 K-pop songs of all time, with critic Jung Min-jae praising "Rain's rich emotional performance" and wrote that it was through this work that solidified his career as a singer.

== Accolades ==
Awards and nominations
Year	Organization	Category	Result	Ref.
2003	Mnet Music Video Festival	Mobile Popularity Award	Won	
2003	Mnet Music Video Festival	Best Male Artist	Nominated	
2003	Seoul Music Awards	Main Prize (Bonsang)	Won	

Music program awards for "How to Avoid the Sun"
Program	Date
Inkigayo	November 9, 2003
Inkigayo	November 23, 2003
Inkigayo	November 30, 2003
Music Camp	December 6, 2003
Music Camp	December 13, 2003
Music Camp	December 20, 2003
Music Camp	December 27, 2003

== Promotion and live performances ==
Rain promoted "How to Avoid the Sun" on South Korean music programs such as Music Camp (former version of Show! Music Core) and Music Bank from October 2003 to January 2004. He additionally performed it on Yoon Do-hyun's Love Letter on November 21, at the 2003 Mnet Music Video Festival on November 27, and the 24th Blue Dragon Film Awards on December 11.

== Track listing ==
How to Avoid the Sun track listing
No.	Title	Lyrics	Music	Arrangement	Length
1.	"2003.10.16"	Park Jin-young	Lunchsong Project; Park Jin-young		1:20
2.	"You Already Knew" (알면서)	Park Jin-young	Park Jin-young	Bang Si-hyuk	3:46
3.	"Why Do I Love You Again" (난 또 니가 좋은거야)	Park Jin-young	Park Jin-young	Bang Si-hyuk	3:30
4.	"How Come" (왜 하필)	Woo Eun-jeung	Woo Eun-jeung		3:30
5.	"To Me You Are" (나에게 너는)	Bang Si-hyuk	JR Groove; Bang Si-hyuk		3:43
6.	"Even You" (너마저)	Bang Si-hyuk	Kim Do-hoon	Kim Do-hoon	3:43
7.	"Do You Love Me Or My Fame" (내가 유명해지니 좋니)	Park Jin-young	Park Jin-young; Bang Si-hyuk	Bang Si-hyuk	3:32
8.	"How to Avoid the Sun (Gtr. Remix)" (태양을 피하는 방법)	Park Jin-young	Park Jin-young	Park Jin-young; Lunchsong Project	3:51
9.	"Men are from Mars, Woman are from Venus" (화성에서 온 남자 금성에서 온 여자)	Bang Si-hyuk	Kim Mi-sun	Kim Mi-sun	3:41
10.	"아쉬운 빈 공간" (The Empty Space)	Park Jin-young	Dick	Dick	3:36
11.	"Instead of Saying Goodbye" (안녕이란 말대신 (Remix))	Park Jin-young	Park Jin-young	Yoo Gun-hyung	3:28
12.	"How to Avoid the Sun" (태양을 피하는 방법)	Park Jin-young	Park Jin-young		3:40
13.	"Even When The Sun Rises" (태양이 떠도)	Park Jin-young	Park Jin-young		1:14
Total length:					42:37

== Charts ==
=== Weekly charts ===
Chart (2007)	Peak position
Japanese Albums (Oricon)	12

=== Monthly charts ===
Chart (2003)	Peak position
South Korean Albums (RIAK)	6

=== Year-end charts ===
Chart (2003)	Position
South Korean Albums (RIAK)	19

== Sales ==
Region	Certification	Certified units/sales
South Korea	—	166,731

== Release history ==
Release history for Rain 2
Region	Date	Version	Format(s)	Label	Ref.
South Korea	October 16, 2003	Korean version	CD; cassette	JYP Entertainment	
Japan	April 4, 2007	Japanese edition	CD	King Records	
