= 1999 Mnet Video Music Awards =

1st edition of the MAMA Awards held in 1999

- Date: November 27, 1999
- Location: Little Angels Arts Center, Seoul, South Korea
- Hosted by: Choi Hal-li
- Most awards: H.O.T., Lee Seung-hwan and Lee Jung-hyun (2)
- Most nominations: H.O.T., Lee Seung-hwan (3)
- Website: Mnet Video Music Awards

Television/radio coverage
- Network: Mnet
- Runtime: 100–110 minutes

The 1999 Mnet Video Music Awards aired on November 27, 1999. The inaugural ceremony recognised the best music videos released in South Korea between December 1998 and November 1999. It was hosted by the television music channel Mnet at the Little Angels Arts Center in Seoul. The awards ceremony, which later became known as the MAMA Awards, was the first of its kind to be held in South Korea. Boy band H.O.T. and soloist Lee Seung-hwan were the show's most-awarded artists with three nominations each. H.O.T., Lee Seung-hwan and Lee Jung-hyun had the most wins, receiving two awards each. The ceremony was hosted by Choi Hal-li.

== Background ==
In March 1999, television music channel Mnet announced that they were planning to host the first annual music video awards ceremony in South Korea. Cho Yong-ho, an executive director at Mnet, indicated that they created the ceremony "to promote music videos as the vanguard of the cultural industry and to revitalise the music market." The ceremony was held on November 27, 1999, at the Little Angels Arts Center in Seoul and was presented by Choi Hal-li.

== Performers ==
| Artist(s) | Song(s) | Notes |
|---|---|---|
| Nanta, Kim Dae-hwan, Park Yu-jin | Traditional South Korean music/rhythm, violins | Animal Jam 1: Opening of the show |
| Team | "Farewell" | Best New Group winner |
| Honey Family | "Man's Story – My Way" | Best Hip-Hop Performance winner |
| Jaurim | "Falling Flower" | Best Rock Performance winner |
| Kim Jong-jin, Jeon Tae-kwan, Kim Yeong-seok, Kim Min-ki, Mi-in, Yoon Do-hyun, Daytripper | Band/medley/"Seven Color Rainbow" | Animal Jam 2: Middle of the show |
| Uhm Jung-hwa | "I Don't Know" | Best Female Artist winner |
| Lee Jung-hyun | "Come" | Best New Artist and Best Dance Performance winner |
| H.O.T. | "I Yah!" | Best Group winner |
| Bros | "Win Win" | |

== Presenters ==
| Name(s) | Role |
|---|---|
| Choi Hal-li | Main host |
| Joo Young-hoon and Yoon Son-ha | Presenters of the award for Best New Group |
| Cha Soo-hyun | Interviewer/backstage host |
| Kim Ri-na | Presenter/host/introducer |
| Yoon Do-hyun and Kim Min | Presenters of the award for Best Indie Performance |
| Kim Kwang-han and Hwang In-young | Presenters of the award for Best International Artist |
| S.E.S., Kim Gun-mo, Uhm Jung-hwa, Puff Daddy, Yang Hyun-suk, Nam Hee-suk | VTR greetings |
| Yoon Sang and Kim Hyo-jin | Presenters of the award for Best Ballad Performance |
| DJ Jun-young and DJ Su | DJs of the night |
| Yoo Ji-tae | Presenter of the award for Best Hip-Hop Performance |
| Chang Da-na | Presenter/host/introducer |
| Kim Jong-jin and Jeon Tae-kwan | Presenters of the award for Best Rock Performance |
| Lee Jung-sik and Park Jin-hee | Presenters of the award for Best Male Artist |
| Choi Jung-won and Kim Hyung-suk | Presenters of the award for Best Female Artist |
| Kim Ji-ryong and Han Seung-joo | Presenters of the special award |
| Jeon Ji-na | Gives a sneak peek on how to make a music video |
| Ha Jae-bong and Yu Ji-na | Presenters of the award for Best Music Video Director |
| Kim Young-eon | Introduces the history of music videos from 1997 to 1998 |
| Lee Hwi-jae and Yoo Jae-suk | Presenters of the award for Best New Solo Artist |
| Oh Mi-ran and Lee Mu-young | Presenters of the award for Best Dance Performance |
| Lee Yo-won and Lee Jung-jae | Presenters of the award for Best Group |
| Lee Chan-chan and Lee Eun-jung | Presenters of the award for Best Popular Music Video Award |
| Choi Hee-chun | Presenter of the award for Music Video of the Year |

== Winners and nominees ==
=== Selection process ===
Music videos released between December 1998 and November 1999 were eligible to be nominated. The candidates were shortlisted by Mnet's selection committee and public votes. Five nominees were then selected in each category by fifty voting agents representing viewers and fifty broadcasting industry professionals, based on criteria such as planning, artistry, filming and editing, originality, and popularity. The winners were chosen by ten voting agents and a panel of fifteen experts, including film director Kim Sung-su, pop music critic Lim Jin-mo, and culture critic Ha Jae-bong.

Winners are listed first, highlighted in boldface, and indicated with a double dagger (‡).

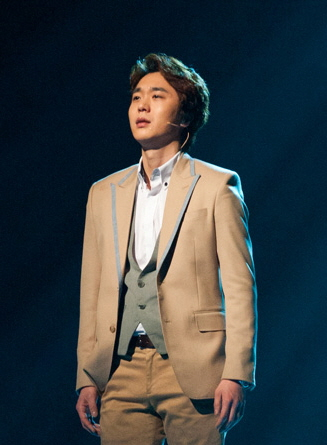
Jo Sungmo won Best Ballad Performance

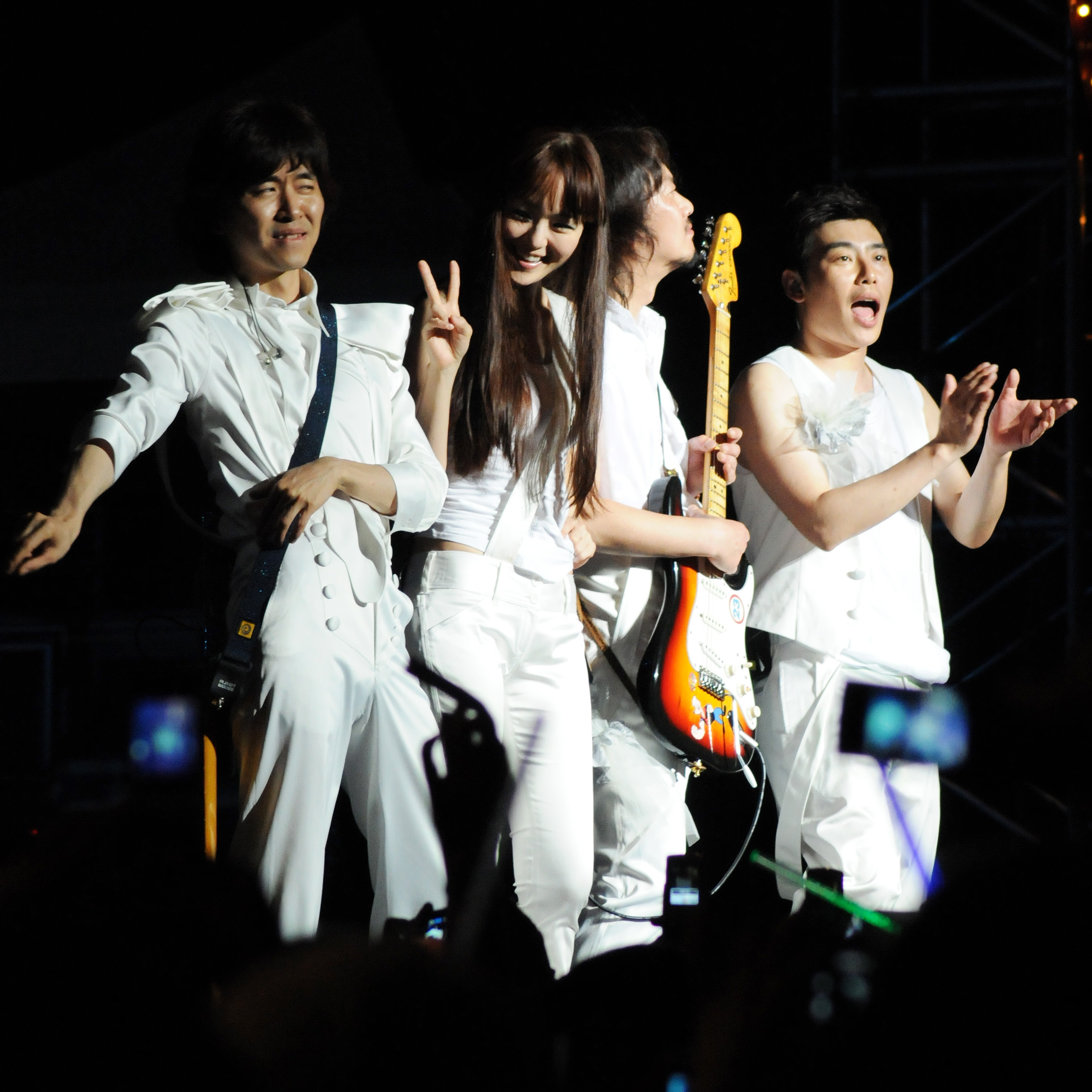
Jaurim won Best Rock Performance

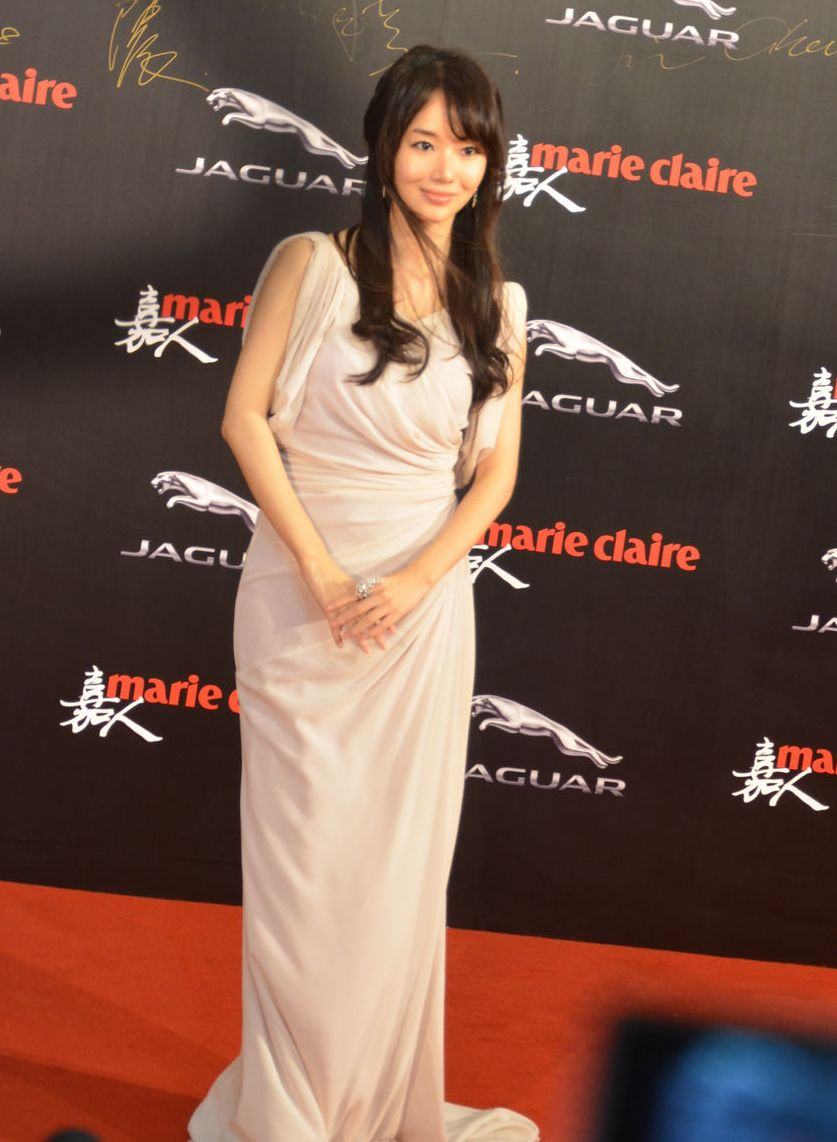
Lee Jung-hyun won Best New Solo Artist and Best Dance Performance

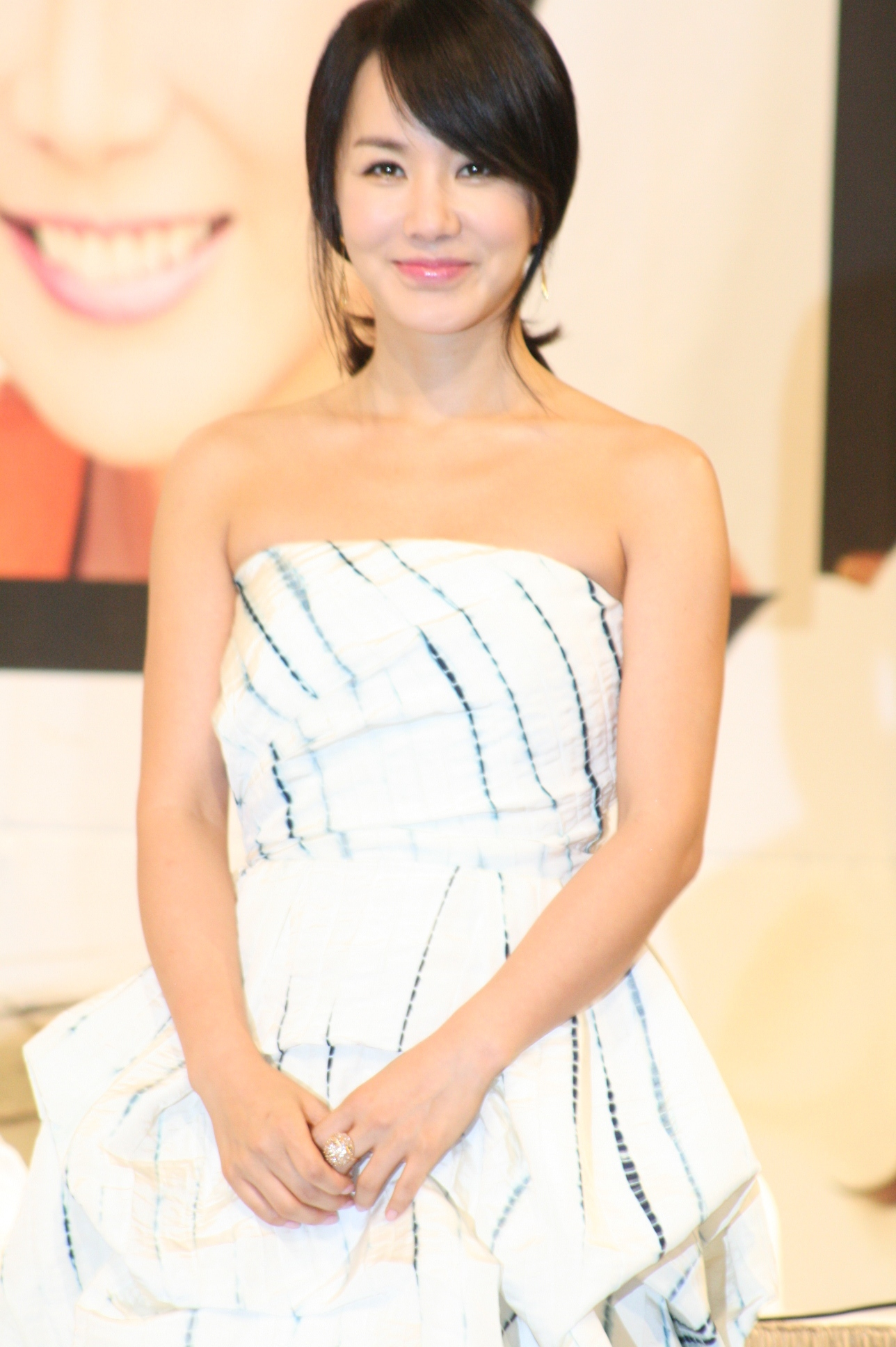
Uhm Jung-hwa won Best Female Artist

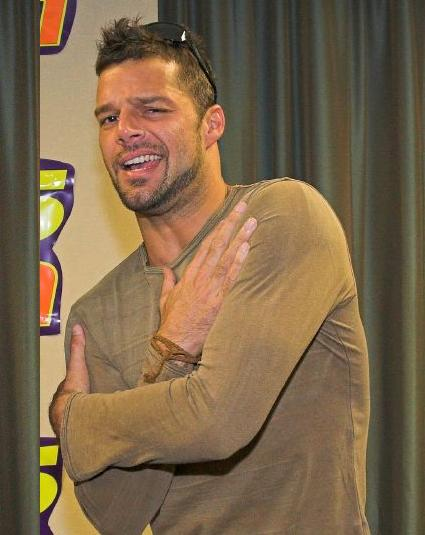
Ricky Martin won Best International Artist

| **Best Popular Music Video** **(Daesang)**: **H.O.T. – "I Yah!"** ‡ | **Music Video of the Year** **(Daesang)**: **Lee Seung-hwan – "A Request"** ‡ |
| **Best New Group**: **Team – "Farewell"** ‡; Voice – "Be Your Own Angel" (너만의 천사가 되어); Yada – "Already Sad Love"; 0–24 – "Freedom" (자유); g.o.d – "To Mother" | **Best New Solo Artist**: **Lee Jung-hyun – "Come"** ‡; Kim Bum-soo – "Promise"; Baek Ji-young – "Choice"; Lee Soo-young – "I Believe"; Cho PD – "Fever" |
| **Best Female Artist**: **Uhm Jung-hwa – "I Don't Know"** ‡; Kwon Jin-won – "Happy Birthday To You"; Lena Park – "A Person in My Dream"; Park Ji-yoon – "I Don't Know Anything"; Yangpa – "Audio" | **Best Male Artist**: **Lee Seung-hwan – "A Request"** ‡; Park Jin-young – "Kiss Me"; Yoo Seung-jun – "Passion"; Jo Sung-mo – "For Your Soul"; K2 – "To her lover" |
| **Best Group**: **H.O.T. – "I Yah!"** ‡; Shinhwa – "T.O.P"; S.E.S. – "I Love You"; Sechs Kies – "Ye Gam"; Fin.K.L – "Forever Love" | **Best Rock Performance**: **Jaurim – "Fall"** ‡; Kim Jong-seo – "Broken Hearted"; Novasonic – "Empire of the Sun"; Delispice – "Running Bicycle"; Red Plus – "Please Come Again Someday" |
| **Best Hip Hop Performance**: **Honey Family – "Man's Story – My Way"** ‡; Drunken Tiger – "Do You Know Hip-Hop"; BROS – "Win Win"; Cho PD – "Fever"; g.o.d – "Dear Mother" | **Best Indie Performance**: **No Brain – "Youth 98"** ‡; Dr. Core 911 – "Sha Sha Funky Shake"; Dalpalan – "Whistle Star Invitation"; Blue Punk Bugs – "Children of Darkness"; Hwang Shin Hye Band – "A Gun" |
| **Best Dance Performance**: **Lee Jung-hyun – "Come"** ‡; Baby V.O.X. – "Get Up"; Uhm Jung-hwa – "I Don't Know"; H.O.T. – "I Yah!"; Clon – "Come To Me" | **Best Ballad Performance**: **Jo Sungmo – "For Your Soul"** ‡; Yoon Jong-shin – "Sendoff"; Lee Seung-hwan – "A Request"; Toy – "Is It Still Beautiful"; Position – "Blue Day" |
| **Best Music Video Director**: **Hong Jong-ho – "I Yah!" by H.O.T.** ‡; Kim Sang-tae – "Men's Story – My Way" by Honey Family; Kim Se-hun – "For Your Soul" by Jo Sungmo; Inhan – "Dear Mother" by g.o.d; Cha Eun-taek – "A Request" by Lee Seung-hwan | **Best International Artist**: **Ricky Martin – "Livin' La Vida Loca"** ‡; Backstreet Boys – "I Want It That Way"; Cher – "Believe"; Geri Halliwell – "Look At Me"; Sting – "Brand New Day"; TLC – "No Scrubs" |

=== Special award ===
- Planning Award – **Lee Chae-hyung**

== Artists with multiple wins and nominations ==
Artists who received multiple awards
| Awards | Artist(s) |
|---|---|
| 2 | H.O.T. |
| 2 | Lee Seung-hwan |
| 2 | Lee Jung-hyun |

Artists who received multiple nominations
| Awards | Artist(s) |
|---|---|
| 3 | H.O.T. |
| 3 | Lee Seung-hwan |
| 2 | g.o.d |
| 2 | Jo Sungmo |
| 2 | Cho PD |
| 2 | Lee Jung-hyun |
| 2 | Uhm Jung-hwa |
