= Mnet Asian Music Awards in the Music Video Awards Category =

Mnet Asian Music Awards in the Music Video Awards category
- Country: South Korea
- Presented by: CJ E&M Pictures (Mnet)
- Website: Mnet Asian Music Awards

The following are the defunct titles in the Music Video Awards Category given by the Mnet Asian Music Awards.

== Most Popular Music Video (daesang) ==
The "Most Popular Music Video" category was a former daesang (or grand prize) award together with the "Music Video of the Year" from 1999 to 2005. Since then, the former was discontinued while the latter was demoted and renamed to "Best Music Video".

Year	Winner(s)	Music video
1999	H.O.T.	"I Yah!"
2000	H.O.T.	"Outside Castle"
2001	g.o.d	"Lie"
2002	BoA	"No. 1"
2003	Lee Hyori	"10 Minutes"
2004	Rain	"It's Raining"
2005	TVXQ	"Rising Sun"

== Music Video Acting ==
Year	Director	Winner(s)
2005	Ryoo Seung-bum	"I'm Not Laughing" by Leessang
2006	Lee Joon-gi (Male category)	"Grace" by Lee Soo-young
2006	Kim Ji-soo (Female category)	"That Man That Woman" by Vibe
2007	Jung Il-woo and Baek Sung-hyun	"오죽했으면" by Goodbye Sadness 구정현

== Music Video Director ==
Year^{[I]}	Director	Music video – Singer(s)	Nominee(s)
1999	Hong Jong-ho	"I Yah!" – H.O.T.	Kim Sang-tae (김상태) – "Men's Story" (님자이야기) by Honey Family; Kim Je-hun (김제훈) – "For Your Soul" by Jo Sungmo; 인한 – "Dear Mother" by g.o.d; Cha Eun-taek (차은택) – "A Request" by Lee Seung-hwan
2000	Gim Sehun (김세훈)		Baek Young-jeon (박영전); Seo Hyeon-seung (서현승); Euntaek (자은택); Hong Jong-ho (홍종호)
2001	Cha Eun-taek (차은택)	"Already One Year" – Brown Eyes	Go Young-jun (고영준); Kim Sehun (김세훈); Seo Hyeon-seung (서현승); Hong Jong-ho (홍종호)
2002	Cha Eun-taek	"If We Can Part Even Though We Love" – Shin Seung-hun	Go Young-jun (고영준); Bak Myeong-cheon (박명천); Seo Hyeon-seung (서현승); Jang Jae-hyeok (장재혁)
2003	Jang Jae-hyuk (장재혁)	"My Silent Conflict" (Moon Hee-joon) and "Flower" (꽃) (Lee Seung-hwan)	Seo Hyeon-seung (서현승); Bak Yeong-jin (박경진); Yi Jun-hyeong (이준형); Hong Jong-ho (홍종호)
2004	Cha Eun-taek (차은택)	"Timeless" (SG Wannabe), "Because You're My Woman" (Lee Seung-gi), "When That Day Comes" (Shin Seung-hun)	Seo Hyeon-seung (서현승); Yi Jun-hyeong (이준형); Jang Jae-hyuk (장재혁); Jo Suh-yeon (조수현)
2005	Seo Hyun-seung	"Goodbye Luv", "Wipe My Tears and Put On Makeup", etc.	Yi Jun-hyeong (이준형); Jang Jae-hyeok (장재혁); Jo Suh-yeon (조수현); Chang (창)
2006	Cha Eun-taek (차은택)	"Entertainer" (Psy), etal.	No nominees announced

== See also ==
- Mnet Asian Music Award for Best Music Video

== Notes ==
^{^[I]} Each year is linked to the article about the Mnet Asian Music Awards held that year.
