= MAMA Award for Best Ballad/R&B Performance =

Music award category

Mnet Asian Music Award for Best Ballad/R&B Performance
- Awarded for: quality ballad/R&B performance
- Country: South Korea
- Presented by: CJ E&M Pictures (Mnet)
- First award: 1999
- Final award: 2009
- Website: Mnet Asian Music Awards

The Mnet Asian Music Award for Best Ballad/R&B Performance was an award presented annually by CJ E&M Pictures (Mnet) from 1999 to 2009.

It was first awarded at the 1st Mnet Asian Music Awards ceremony held in 1999; Jo Sungmo won the award for his ballad performance in "For Your Soul", and it is given in honor for the artist/s with the best ballad performance in the music industry. The next year, the category branched out into two separate categories — Best Ballad Performance and Best R&B Performance. Later in the 10th Mnet Asian Music Awards in 2008, the two categories were joined together once again, and continued to be given until the 11th Mnet Asian Music Awards in 2009 wherein Kim Tae-woo received the last award for his performance in "Love Rain".

== History ==
Key to the colors used below
Category
Best Ballad Performance
Best R&B Performance
Best Ballad/R&B Performance

Year(s)	Best Ballad	Best R&B	Best Ballad/R&B
1999	check		
2000-2007	check	check	
2008-2009			check

== Winners and nominees ==
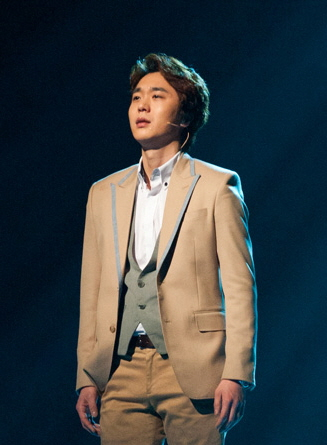
Jo Sungmo, (1999, 2000, 2003)

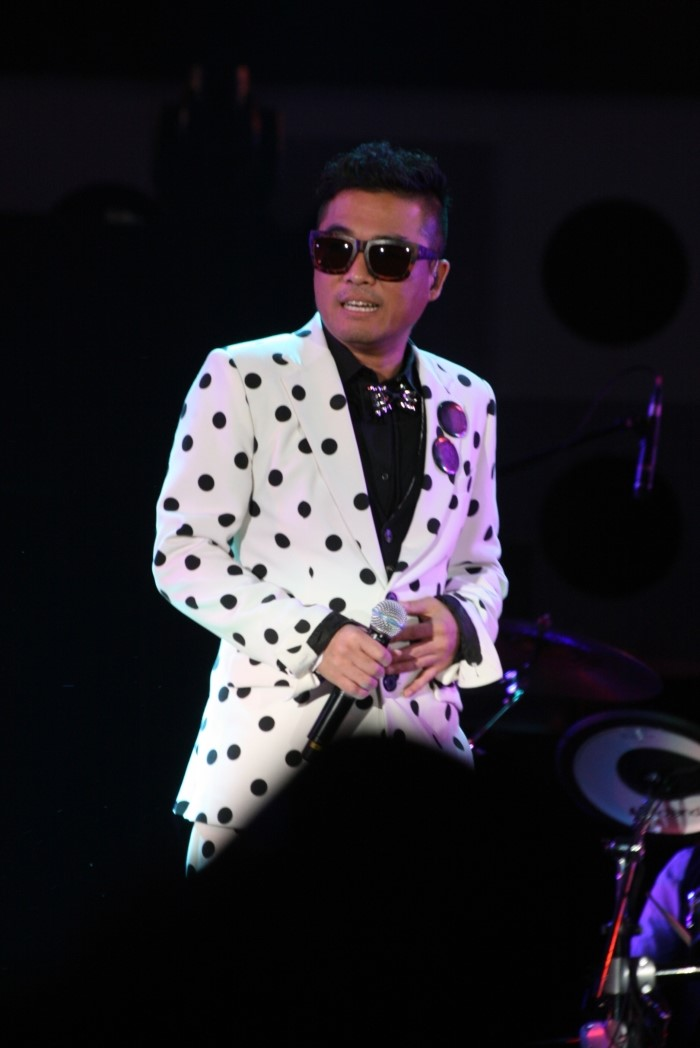
Kim Gun-mo, (2001)

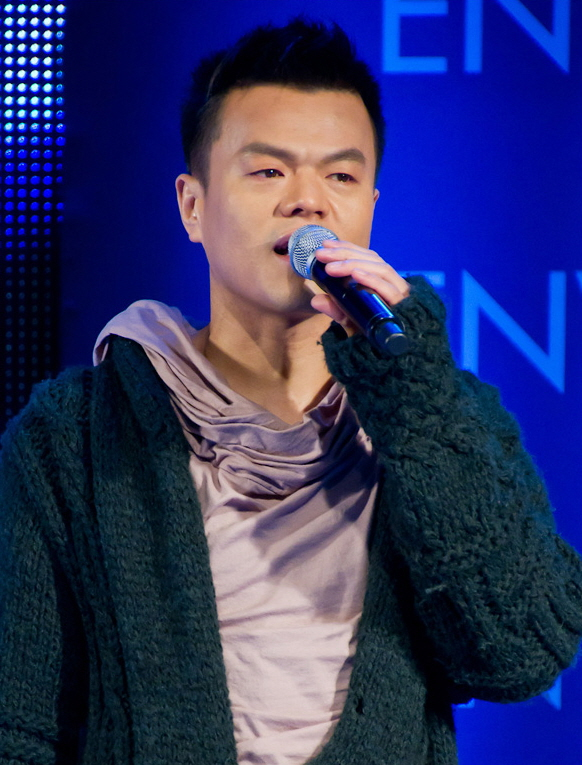
Park Jin-young, (2001)

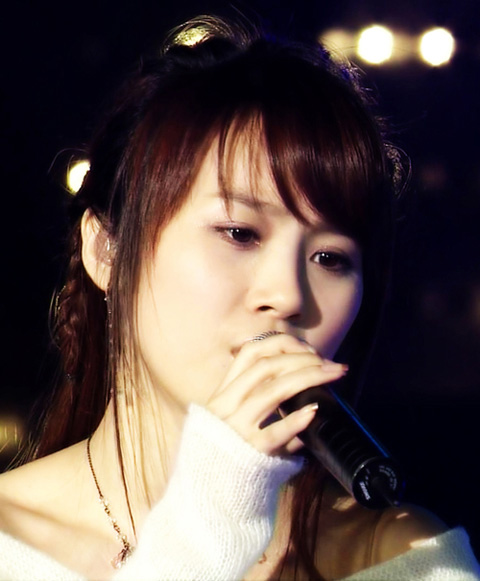
Lee Soo-young, (2002)

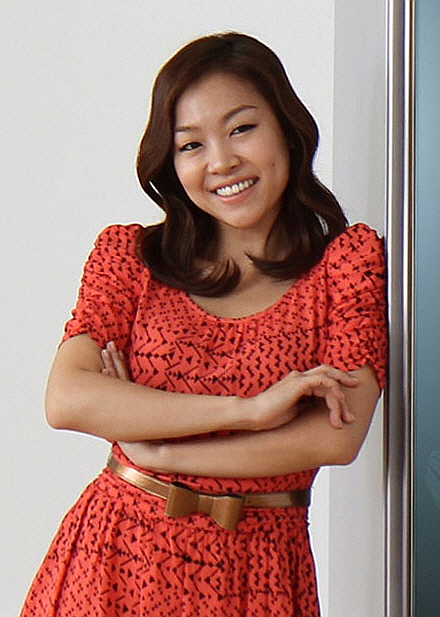
Lena Park, (2002)

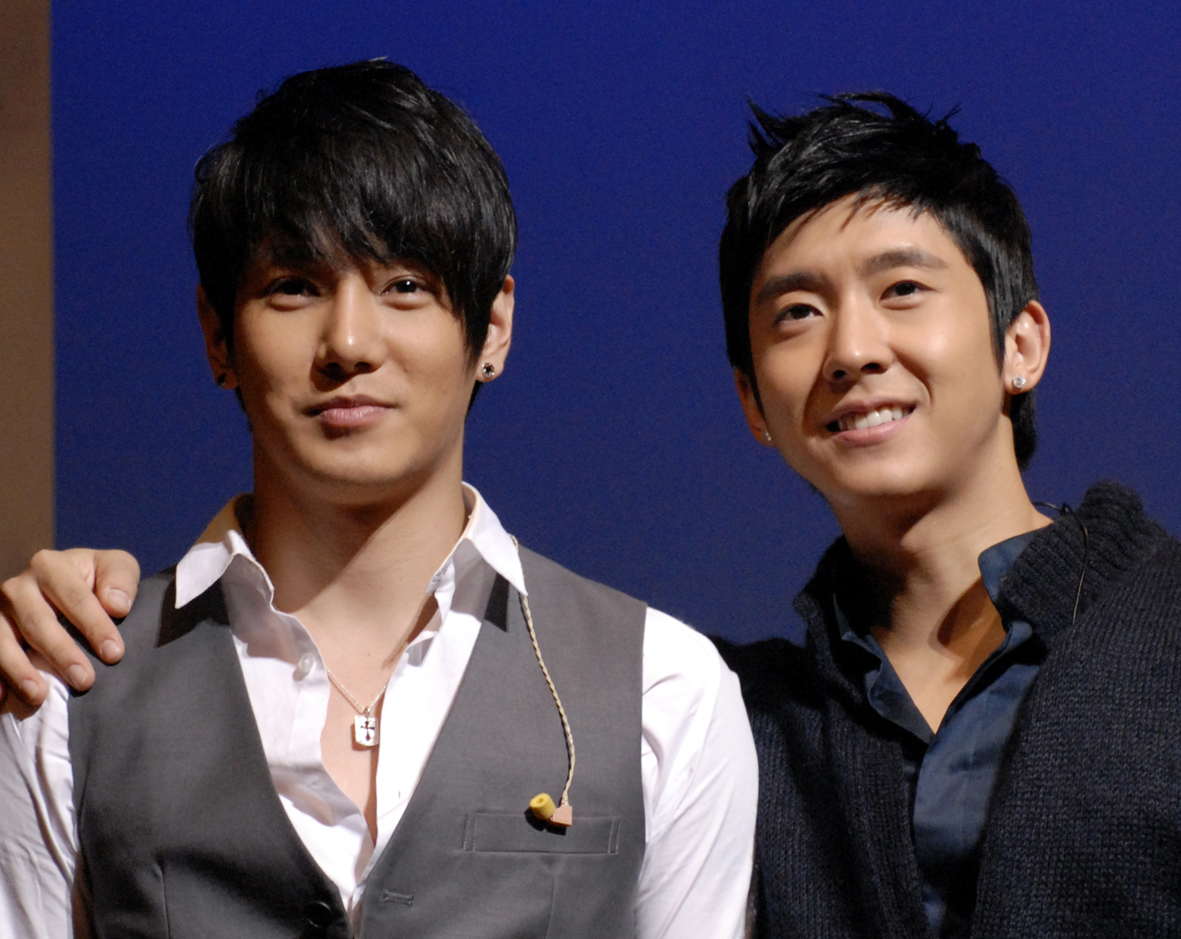
Fly To The Sky, (2003, 2006)

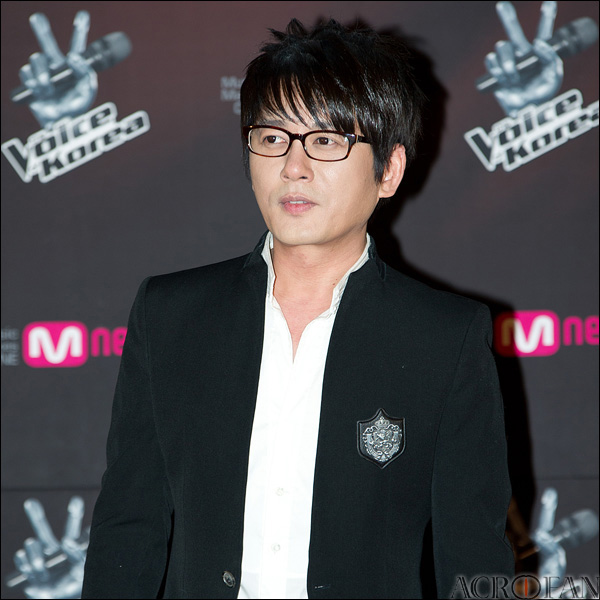
Shin Hye-sung, (2005)

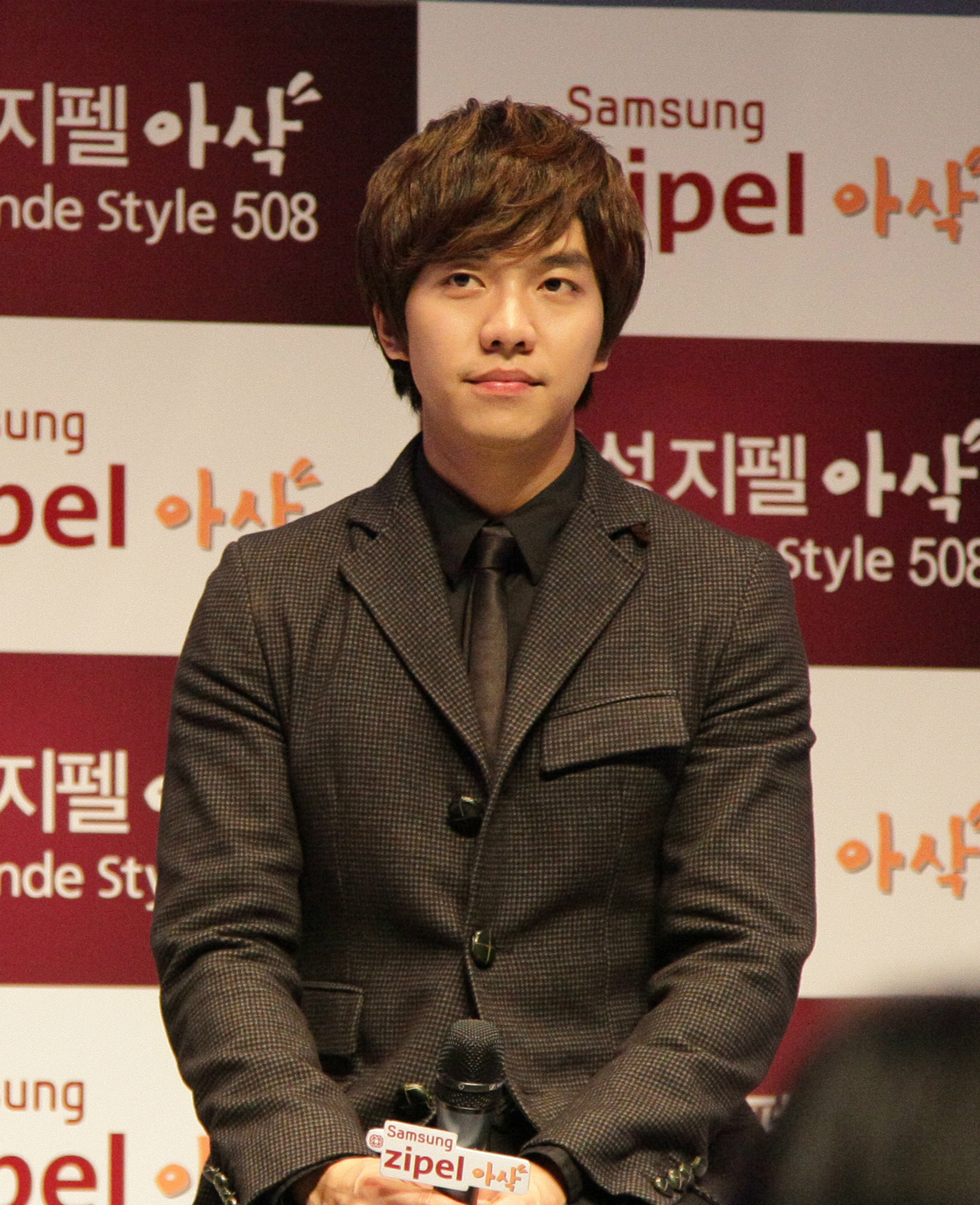
Lee Seung-gi, (2006)

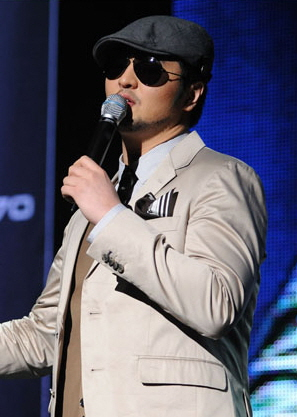
Kim Tae-woo, (2009)

Year^{[I]}	Winner(s)	Song	Nominee(s)
1999 (1st)	Jo Sungmo	"For Your Soul"	Yoon Jong-shin - "배웅"; Lee Seung-hwan - "A Request"; Toy - "여전히 아름다운지"; Position (포지션) - "Blue Day"
2000 (2nd)	Jo Sungmo	"Do You Know"	Shin Seung-hun - "After Separation" (이별그후); Lee Seung-hwan - "Live A Long Long Time" (그대가 그대를); Im Chang-jung - "나의 연인"; 조규만 - "Give You Everything" (다 줄꺼야)
2000 (2nd)	Jinju	"Are You Going"	Fly To The Sky - "Day By Day"; As One - "For You Not To Know" (너만은 모르길); J (제이) - "As Yesterday" (어제처럼); g.o.d - "Since You Left Me" (그대 날 떠난 후로)
2001 (3rd)	Kim Gun-mo	"I'm Sorry"	Kangta - "Polaris"; Lee Ki-chan - "Love Has Left Again" (또 한번 사랑은 가고); Wax - "Fix My Make-up" (화장을 고치고); Position - "I Love You"
2001 (3rd)	Park Jin-young	"I Have a Girlfriend"	Kim Jo-Han (김조한) - "Just Until Today" (오늘까지만); Nineteen Plus One (박화요비) - "Teardrop" (눈물); Brown Eyes - "Already One Year" (벌써 1년); Fly to the Sky - "The Promise" (약속)
2002 (4th)	Lee Soo-young	"Lalala"	Kangta - "Memories" (사랑은 기억보다); Park Hyo-shin - "Good Person" (좋은사람); Sung Si-kyung - "You Touched My Heart" (넌 감동이었어); Im Chang-jung - "Sad Monologue" (슬픈혼잣말)
2002 (4th)	Lena Park	"In Dreams"	RIch - "I Have A Dream" (사랑해 이말밖엔); Hwayobi - "Hwayobi - "Eot-teon Gayo" (어떤가요); Fly to the Sky - "My Heart"; Wheesung - "Can't We"
2003 (5th)	Jo Sungmo	"Piano"	Kim Bum-soo - "I Miss You" (보고싶다); Ock Joo-hyun - "I"; Lee Soo-young - "Solitary" (덩그러니); Lee Seung-hwan - "Flower"
2003 (5th)	Fly To The Sky	"Missing You"	Brown Eyed Soul - "I Love You" (정말 사랑했을까); Big Mama - "Break Away"; Seven - "Once Again" (한번 단 한번); Wheesung - "With Me" (휘성)
2004 (6th)	Shin Seung-hun (Note: Titled as "Best Ballad Video" award.)	"When That Day Comes"	Kim Jong-kook - "One Man" (한 남자); Park Hyo-shin - "Standing There" (그 곳에 서서); Lee Soo-young - "Whistle To Me" (휠릴리); Lee Seung-chul - "The Livelong Day" (긴 하루)
2004 (6th)	Wheesung (Note: Titled as "Best R&B Video" award.)	"Incurable Illness"	Gummy - "Loss Of Memory"; Lyn - "Used To Love"; Vibe - "As I'm Getting Older" (오래오래); SG Wannabe - "Timeless"
2005 (7th)	Shin Hye-sung	"Same Thought"	Kim Jong-kook - "Standstill" (제자리걸음); KCM - "Smile Again"; SG Wannabe - "As We Live" (살다가); Tei - "Love... Is The Only One" (사랑은...하나다)
2005 (7th)	Wheesung	"Goodbye Luv"	Kangta - "Persona"; Gummy - "No" (아니); Naul - "Ear" (귀로); Lena Park - "Day" (날)
2006 (8th)	Lee Seung-gi	"Hard to Say"	Baek Ji-young - "I Won't Love"; Sung Si-kyung - "On The Street"; Lee Soo-young - "Grace"; Ha Dong-kyun - "Please Love Her"
2006 (8th)	Fly To The Sky	"Like a Man"	Vibe - "The Man The Woman"; SeeYa - "Crazy Love Song"; SG Wannabe - "Partner For Life"; Lim Jeong-hee - "Traces"
2007 (9th)	Yangpa	"Love... What Is It"	Kim Dong-wan - "Handkerchief"; Shin Hye-sung - "The First Person"; Lee Ki-chan - "Beautiful Woman"; MC the Max - "Stop My Heart"
2007 (9th)	SG Wannabe (Note: Titled as "Best R&B Soul Award")	"Arirang"	Bobby Kim - "Bluebird"; Wheesung - "Love Is Delicious"; Fly to the Sky - "My Angel"; Yoon Mi-rae - "Have You Forgotten?"
2008 (10th)	Brown Eyes (Note: Titled as "Best Ballad/R&B Award")	"Don't Go Don't Go"	Kim Dong-ryool - "Let's Start Again"; Park Ji-Hyun - During The Days I Want To See You"; Taeyang - "Look At Me Only"; V.O.S - "Beautiful Life"
2009 (11th)	Kim Tae-woo	"Love Rain"	Kim Jong-kook - "Today More Than Yesterday"; Bobby Kim - "Love... That Guy"; Park Hyo-shin - "After Love"; Baek Ji-young - "Like Being Shot By A Bullet"

^{^[I]} Each year is linked to the article about the Mnet Asian Music Awards held that year.

== Multiple awards for Best Ballad/R&B Performance ==
The following lists the artist(s) who received multiple awards for Best Ballad/R&B Performance from 1999 to 2009.

Artist	Record Set	First year awarded	Last year awarded
Jo Sungmo	3	1999	2003
Fly To The Sky	2	2003	2006
Wheesung	2	2004	2005

== Notes ==
Sources
