= Kim Gun-mo =

South Korean singer-songwriter (born 1968)

Kim Gun-Mo
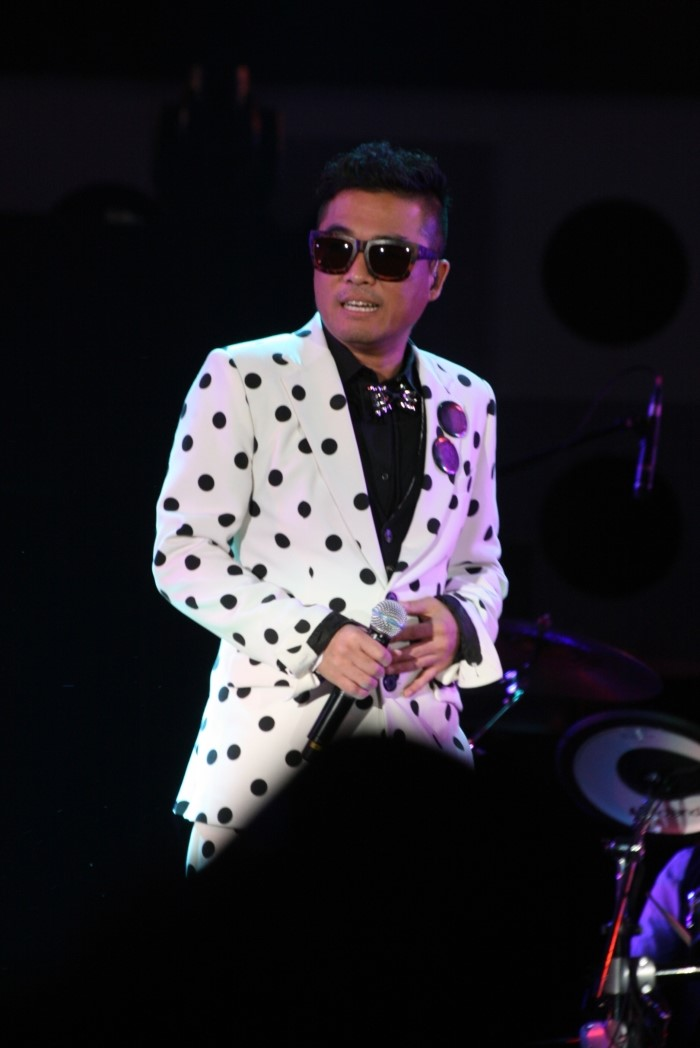
- Kim in 2012

Background information
- Born: January 13, 1968 (age 58)
- Origin: Busan, South Korea
- Genres: K-pop; ballad
- Occupation: Singer-songwriter
- Instruments: Vocals; piano
- Years active: 1992–present

Korean name
- Hangul: 김건모
- Hanja: 金健模
- RR: Gim Geonmo
- MR: Kim Kŏnmo

Kim Gun-mo (Korean: 김건모; born January 13, 1968) is a South Korean singer-songwriter who is considered the country's most successful musical artist of the 1990s. His 1995 album, Wrongful Meeting, previously held the Guinness World Record for the best-selling album of all time in South Korea. Since his debut in 1992, Kim has released 13 full-length albums and has won numerous awards, including Album of the Year at the Golden Disc Awards for three consecutive years from 1994 to 1996. In 2011, he received a presidential commendation from the South Korean government for his contributions to popular culture.

== Early life ==
Kim was born on January 13, 1968, in Busan, South Korea. He was interested in music from a young age and started playing the piano when he was four years old. He attended elementary, middle, and high school in Seoul and graduated from Seoul Institute of the Arts. He served in the South Korean Navy in the late 1980s.

== Career ==
Kim debuted with Kim Gun Mo 1 in 1992, which was followed by his second album Excuse in 1993. His third album Mis-Encounter came out in 1995. In the following year, he released Exchange. As one of the most popular Korean entertainers, Kim holds the record for biggest selling album in Korea with his third studio album, which sold over 3.3 million copies. Kim's albums rank consistently high on Korean music charts; his 8th album, Hestory, was the best-selling album of 2003. His most famous songs include "Excuse", "Mis-Encounter", and "Jjangga". In 2004, he released his 9th album Kim Gun Mo 9 which is reminiscent of his first album. This album was his second restarting point in his music career. In the following year, he came up with Be Like... which was also a huge success in Korea. His most recent work was released in 2008, entitled, Soul Groove.

== Personal life ==
Kim married pianist Jang Ji-yeon in 2019, whom he met through a mutual friend. They later divorced in 2022.

On December 8, 2019, lawyer Kang Yong-suk of the far-right think tank Hover Lab announced that he was representing a woman who alleged that Kim sexually assaulted her. Kim denied the allegation and stated that he would take legal action against Kang. In 2022, the Seoul High Prosecutors' Office dismissed the rape charge against Kim.

== Discography ==
=== Studio albums ===
Title	Album details	Peak chart positions	Sales
Title	Album details	KOR	Sales
Sleepless Rainy Night (잠못드는 밤 비는 내리고)	Released: October 29, 1992; Label: Line Production; Formats: CD, cassette; Track listing: 1. After A Break Up; 2. Sleepless Rainy Night; 3. As Much As I Feel For You; 4. Your Reason; 5. Afternoon Scenery; 6. The Sadness I Feel; 7. Love For You; 8. First Sight; 9. Reminiscence; 10. Sleepless Rainy Night (Club Remix Version); 11. Your Reason (Remix Version); 12. First Sight (Remix Version); 13. Sleepless Rainy Night (Dance Remix Version)	No data*	KOR: 1,000,000
Excuses (핑계)	Released: October 20, 1993; Label: Line Production; Formats: CD, cassette	No data*	KOR: 1,830,000
Wrongful Meeting (잘못된 만남)	Released: January 21, 1995; Label: Line Production; Formats: CD, cassette	No data*	KOR: 3,300,000
Exchange	Released: May 17, 1996; Label: Geoneum; Formats: CD, cassette	No data*	KOR: 1,810,000
Myself	Released: December 1, 1997; Label: Geoneum; Formats: CD, cassette	No data*	KOR: 1,000,000
Growing	Released: November 19, 1999; Label: Geoneum; Formats: CD, cassette	1	KOR: 480,736
Another Days	Released: May 5, 2001; Label: Geoneum; Formats: CD, cassette	1	KOR: 1,376,581
Hestory	Released: February 27, 2003; Label: Geoneum; Formats: CD, cassette	1	KOR: 529,416
Kimgunmo	Released: September 3, 2004; Label: Geoneum; Formats: CD, cassette	—	—N/a
Be Like...	Released: June 16, 2005; Label: Geoneum; Formats: CD, cassette	—	—N/a
Style Album 11: Scarecrow (Style Album 11: 허수아비)	Released: March 15, 2007; Label: Geoneum; Formats: CD, cassette	—	—N/a
Soul Groove	Released: August 7, 2008; Label: Media Line; Formats: CD	7	KOR: 19,876
Autobiography & Best (자서전 & Best)	Released: September 27, 2011; Label: Media Line; Formats: CD, digital download	10	KOR: 5,887
* Chart positions not available prior to 1999. "—"denotes release did not chart.

=== Extended plays ===
Title	Album details	Peak chart positions	Sales
Title	Album details	KOR	Sales
50	Released: November 19, 2016; Label: Music&NEW; Formats: CD, digital download	12	KOR: 14,168

== Filmography ==
=== Variety shows ===
Year	Title	Role
2016–2019	My Ugly Duckling	Himself

== Awards and nominations ==
Name of the award ceremony, year presented, category, nominee of the award, and the result of the nomination
Award ceremony	Year	Category	Nominee / work	Result	Ref.
Golden Disc Awards	1994	Album of the Year	Excuses	Won	
Golden Disc Awards	1995	Album of the Year	Wrongful Encounter	Won	
Golden Disc Awards	1996	Album of the Year	Exchange	Won	
Mnet Asian Music Awards	2001	Best Ballad Performance	"Sorry" (미안해요)	Won	
Mnet Asian Music Awards	2003	Best Male Artist	"Wedding Invitation" (청첩장)	Nominated	
Mnet Asian Music Awards	2011	Best Vocal Solo Performance	"Today is More Sad Than Yesterday"	Nominated	
Seoul Music Awards	1994	Grand Prize	Kim Gun-mo	Won	
Seoul Music Awards	2001	Grand Prize	Kim Gun-mo	Won	

=== State honors ===
Name of country, year given, and name of honor
Country	Year	Honor	Ref.
South Korea (Note: Honors are given at the Korean Popular Culture and Arts Awards, arranged by the Korea Creative Content Agency and hosted by the Ministry of Culture, Sports and Tourism. They are awarded to those who have contributed to the arts and South Korea's pop culture.)	2011	Presidential Commendation	

== See also ==
- List of best-selling albums in South Korea
