= MAMA Award for Best International Artist =

Music award category

Mnet Asian Music Award for Best International Artist (베스트 인터내셔널 아티스트상)
- Awarded for: global recognition of international artist(s)
- Country: South Korea
- Presented by: CJ E&M Pictures (Mnet)
- First award: 1999
- Currently held by: Ed Sheeran (2021)
- Website: Mnet Asian Music Awards

The Mnet Asian Music Award for Best International Artist (베스트 인터내셔널 아티스트상) is an award presented annually by CJ E&M Pictures (Mnet). It was first awarded at the 1st Mnet Asian Music Awards ceremony held in 1999; international artist Ricky Martin won the award, and it is given in honor for the international performers who achieve global recognition in the music industry.

== Winners list ==
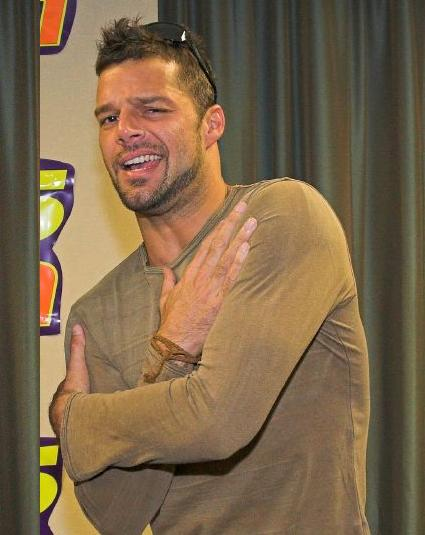
Ricky Martin, First recipient (1999)

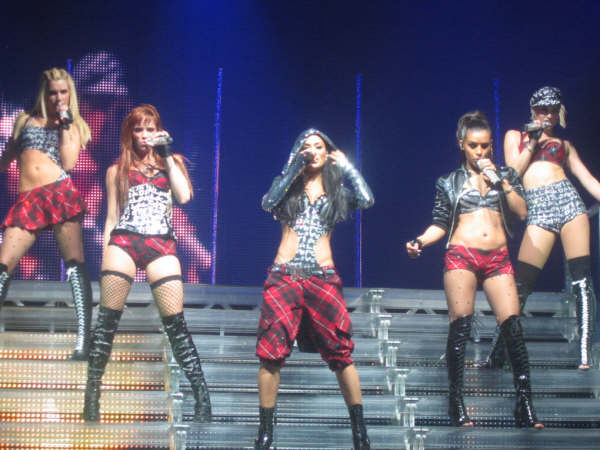
The Pussycat Dolls, 2-time winners (2006-2009)

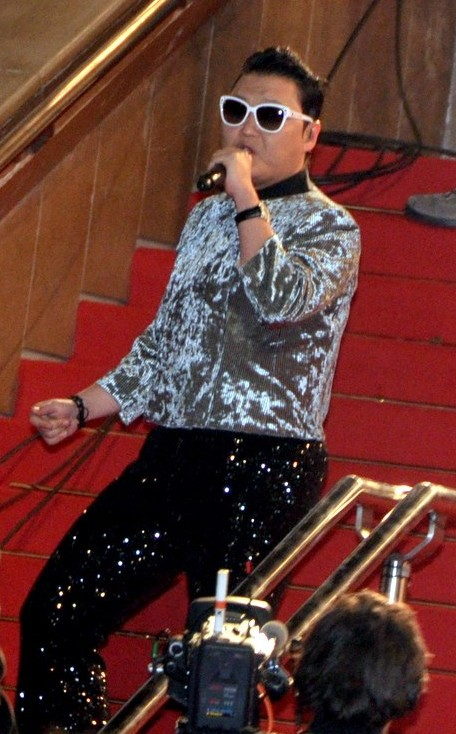
Psy, First South-Korean winner (2012)

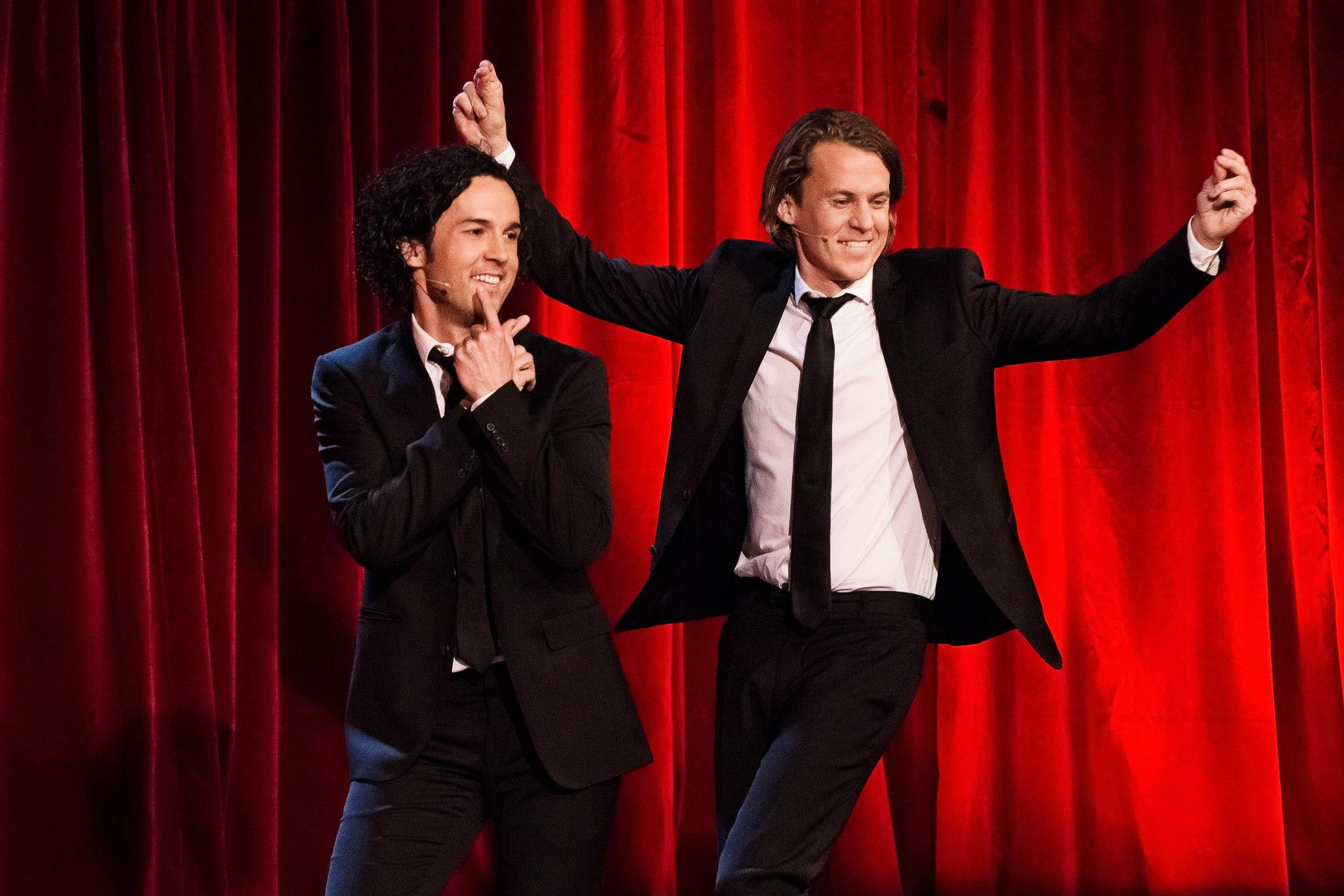
Ylvis, First Norwegian winner (2013)

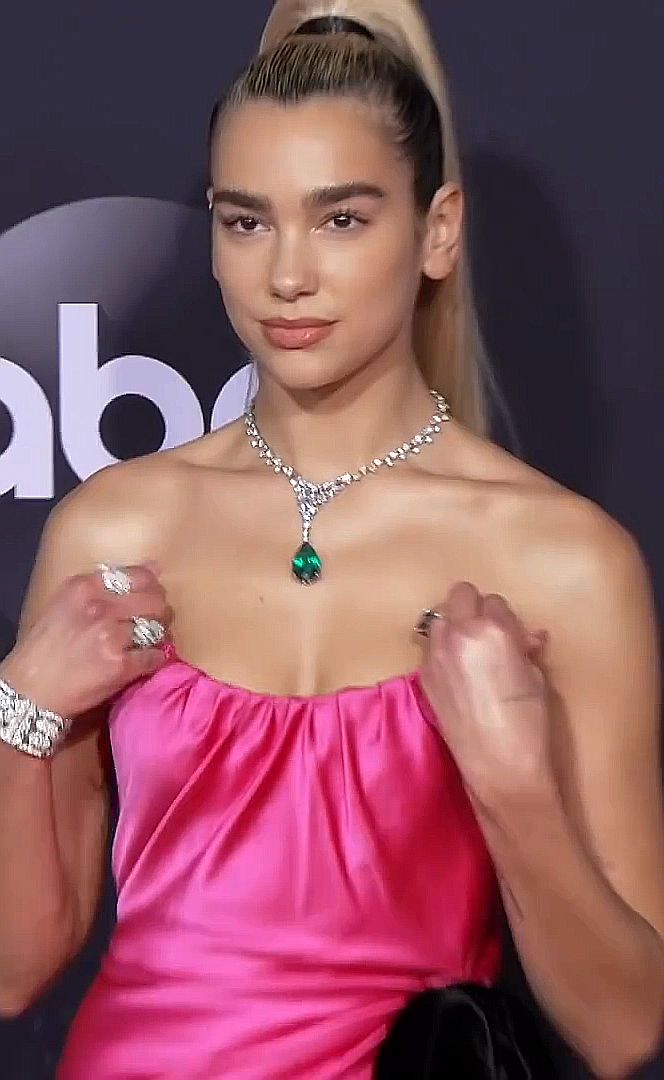
Dua Lipa First UK winner (2019)

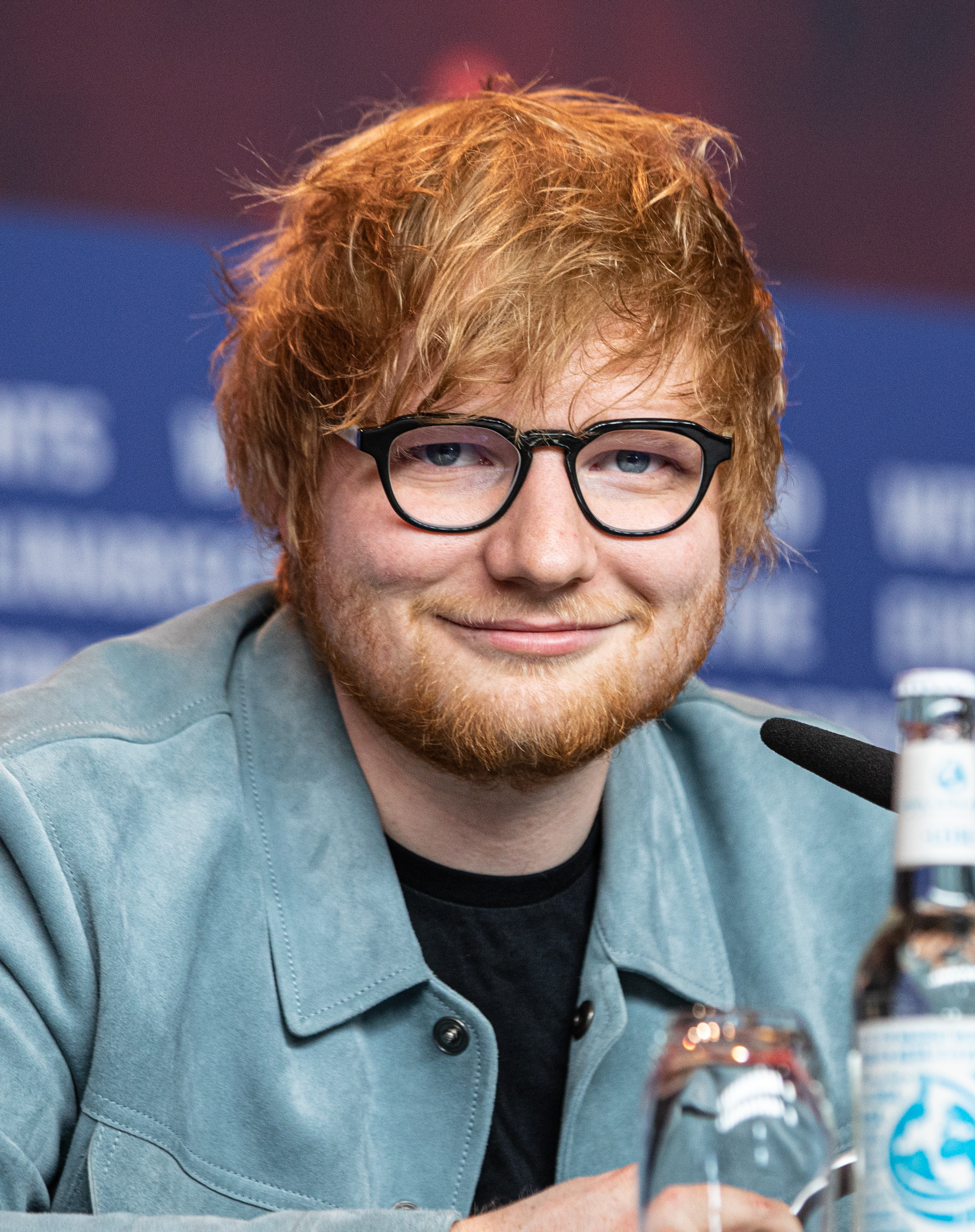
Ed Sheeran 2021 winner

Year^{[I]}	Country	Winner(s) - Song
1999 (1st)	Puerto Rico	Ricky Martin - "Livin' La Vida Loca"
1999 (1st)	Nominees: Backstreet Boys - "I Want It That Way" (United States); Cher - "Believe" (United States); Geri Halliwell - "Look At Me" (England); Sting - "Brand New Day" (England); TLC - "No Scrubs" (United States)	
2000 (2nd)	USA	Britney Spears - "Oops!... I Did It Again"
2000 (2nd)	(Note: The winner was unannounced during the event, but was acknowledged through MKMF's official website.)	
2001 (3rd)	USA	*NSYNC - "Pop"
2001 (3rd)	Nominees: Bosson - "One in a Million" (Sweden); Brian McKnight - "Love of My Life" (United States); M2M - "Everything" (Norway); Mariah Carey - "Loverboy" (United States); Michael Jackson - "You Rock My World" (United States); Westlife - "Uptown Girl" (Republic of Ireland)	
2002 (4th)	USA	Eminem - "Without Me"
2002 (4th)	Nominees: Blue - "All Rise" (England); Britney Spears - "I'm Not a Girl, Not Yet a Woman" (United States); Christina Aguilera - "Dirrty" (United States); Linkin Park - "Points of Authority" (United States); Shakira - "Objection (Tango)" (Colombia); Stereophonics - "Have a Nice Day" (Wales)	
2003 (5th)	USA	Linkin Park - "Somewhere I Belong"
2003 (5th)	Nominees: Beyoncé - "Crazy in Love" (United States); Gareth Gates - "Anyone of Us (Stupid Mistake)" (England); Stacie Orrico - "Stuck" (United States); t.A.T.u. - "All the Things She Said" (Russia)	
2004 (6th)	USA	Usher - "Yeah!"
2005 (7th)	USA	The Black Eyed Peas - "Don't Lie"
2006 (8th)	USA	The Pussycat Dolls - "Buttons"
2009 (11th)	USA	The Pussycat Dolls
2010 (12th)	USA	Far East Movement
2012 (14th)	South Korea	Psy - "Gangnam Style"
2013 (15th)	Norway	Ylvis - "What Does the Fox Say?"
2014 (16th)	USA	John Legend - "All of Me"
2019 (21st)	UK	Dua Lipa - "Don't Start Now"
2021 (23rd)	UK	Ed Sheeran - "Bad Habits"

^{^[I]} Each year is linked to the article about the Mnet Asian Music Awards held that year.

== Multiple awards for International Artist ==
As of 2014, only one artist received the title two or more times.

Female artist	Record Set	First year awarded	Recent year awarded
The Pussycat Dolls	2	2006	2009
