= MAMA Award for Best Music Video =

Korean music video award

Mnet Asian Music Award for Best Music Video
- Awarded for: Quality short form music videos
- Country: South Korea
- Presented by: CJ E&M Pictures (Mnet)
- First award: 1999
- Currently held by: Jennie – "Zen" (2025)

Highlights
- Most wins: BTS (5)
- Most nominations: BTS (6)
- Website: Official website

The Mnet Asian Music Award for Best Music Video (Korean: 뮤직비디오 작품상; RR: Myujigbidio jagpumsang) is an award presented annually by CJ E&M (Mnet) at the Mnet Asian Music Awards. The event was launched in 1999 as the Mnet Video Music Awards and was primarily a music video-centered awards ceremony, modeled after the MTV Video Music Awards. From its inaugural ceremony up until the 2005 awards, the category was officially titled Music Video of the Year and consisted of one of the two daesang (or most prestigious) prizes, alongside the Most Popular Music Video category. In 2006, the event underwent an overhaul; the daesang status of the category was removed, and it was retitled as "Best Music Video". Meanwhile, the Most Popular Music Video category was discontinued.

In 1999, the inaugural Mnet Asian Music Award for Best Music Video was presented to Lee Seung-hwan for the video "A Request". In 2005, the video for "Isolated Ones! Left Foot Forward!" by Drunken Tiger was the final recipient of the Music Video of the Year daesang before its rebranding the following year. Since then, five artists have received the accolade more than once; among them, BTS holds the distinction for the most wins in the category, winning for five consecutive years between 2017 and 2021. BTS, in addition, has received the most nominations in the category with six.

== Winners and nominees ==
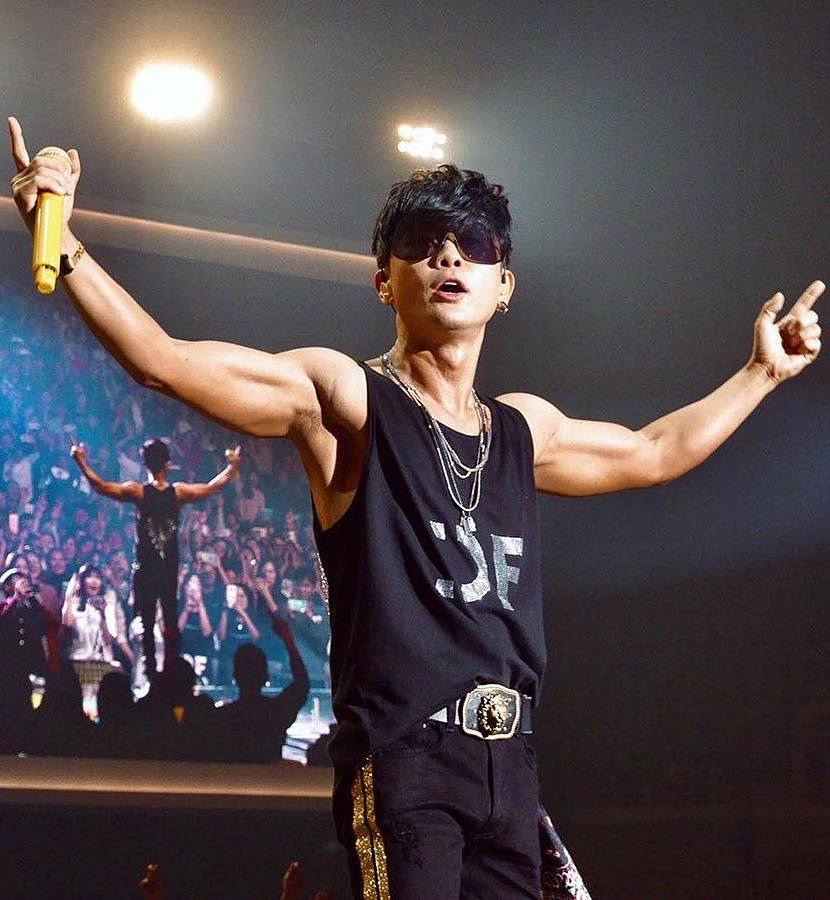
Lee Seung-hwan was the award's first recipient in 1999 for "A Request".

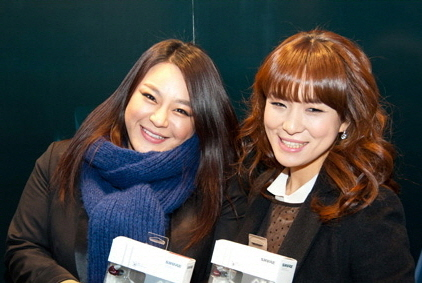
Big Mama won the award for "Break Away" in 2003.

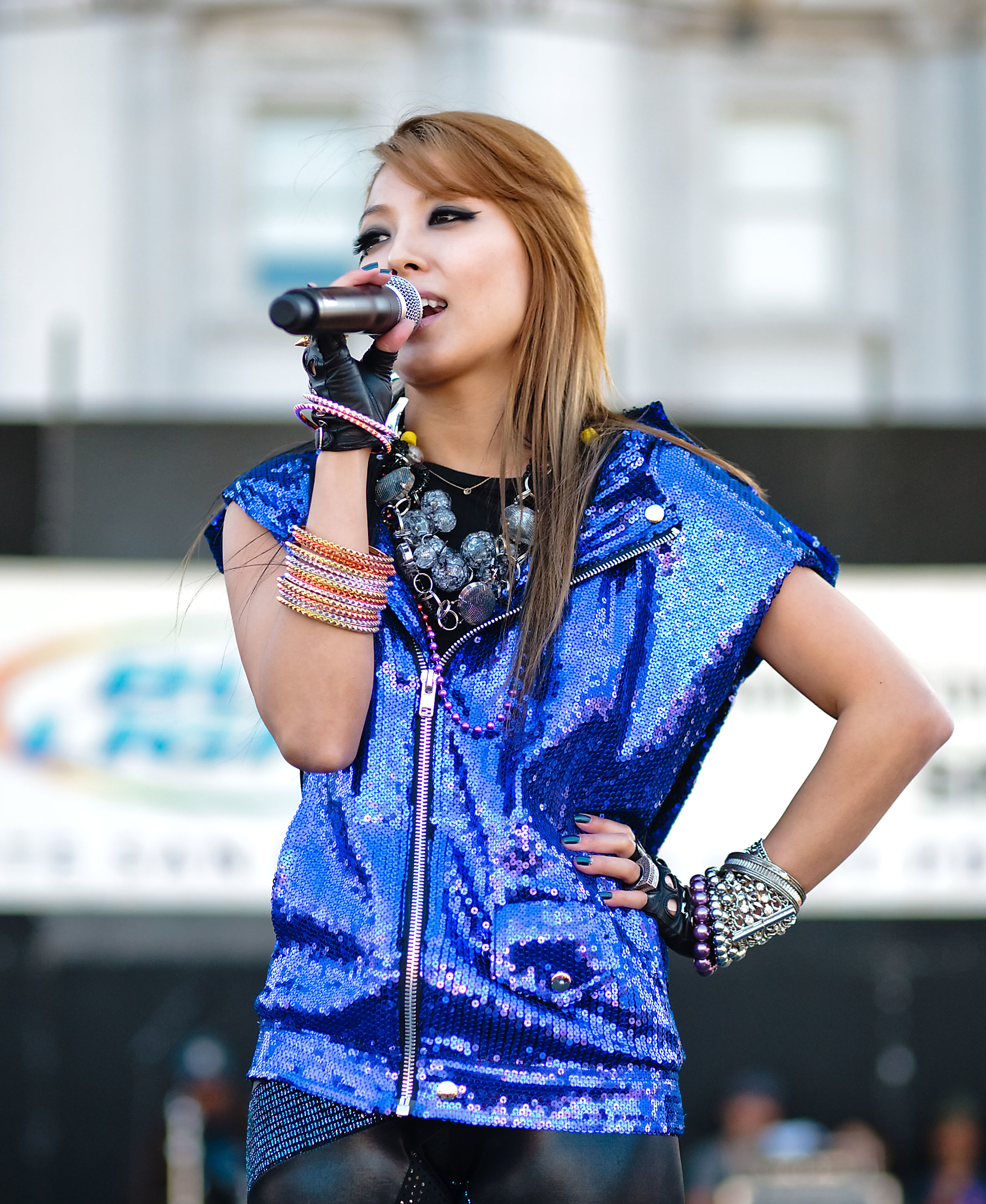
BoA received the award for "My Name" in 2004.

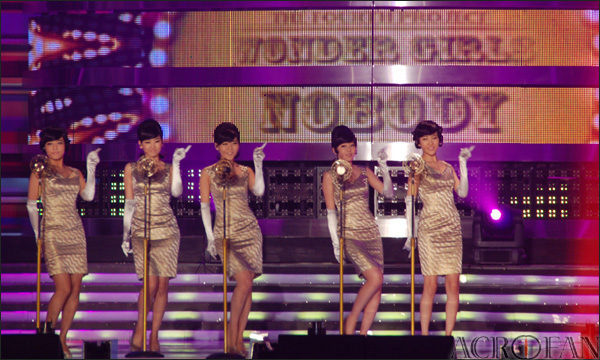
Wonder Girls won the award for "Nobody" in 2008.

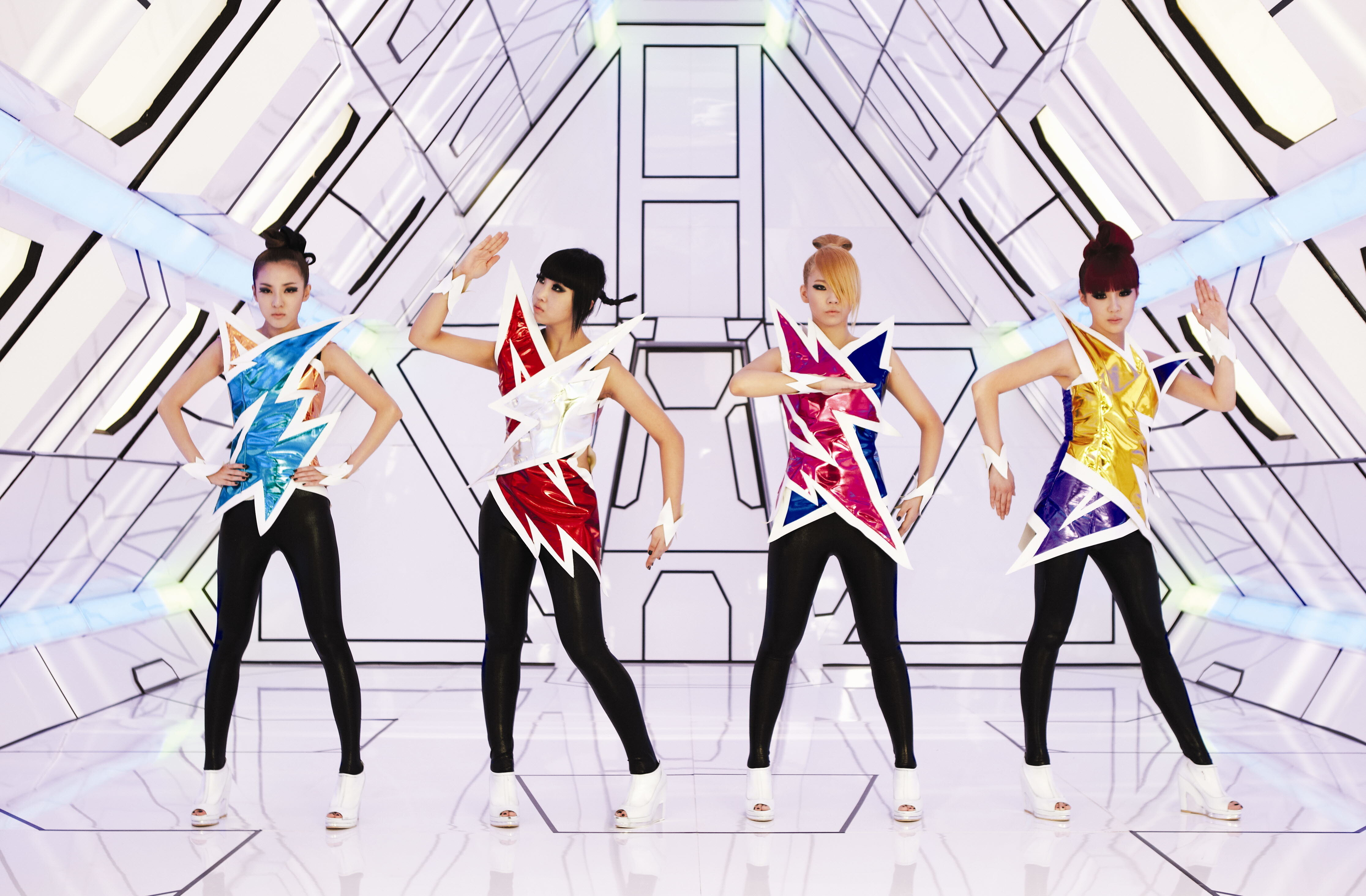
2NE1 received the 2009 and 2010 awards for "Fire" and "Can't Nobody", respectively.

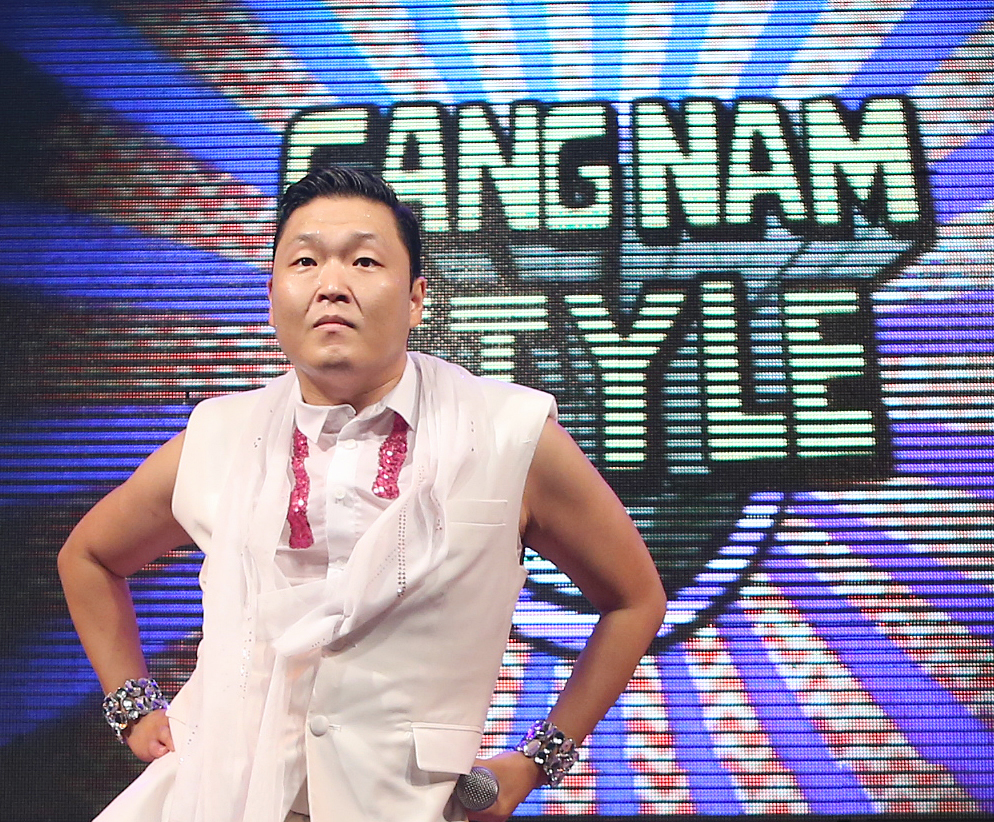
Psy received the award in 2006 for "Entertainer" and 2012 for "Gangnam Style".

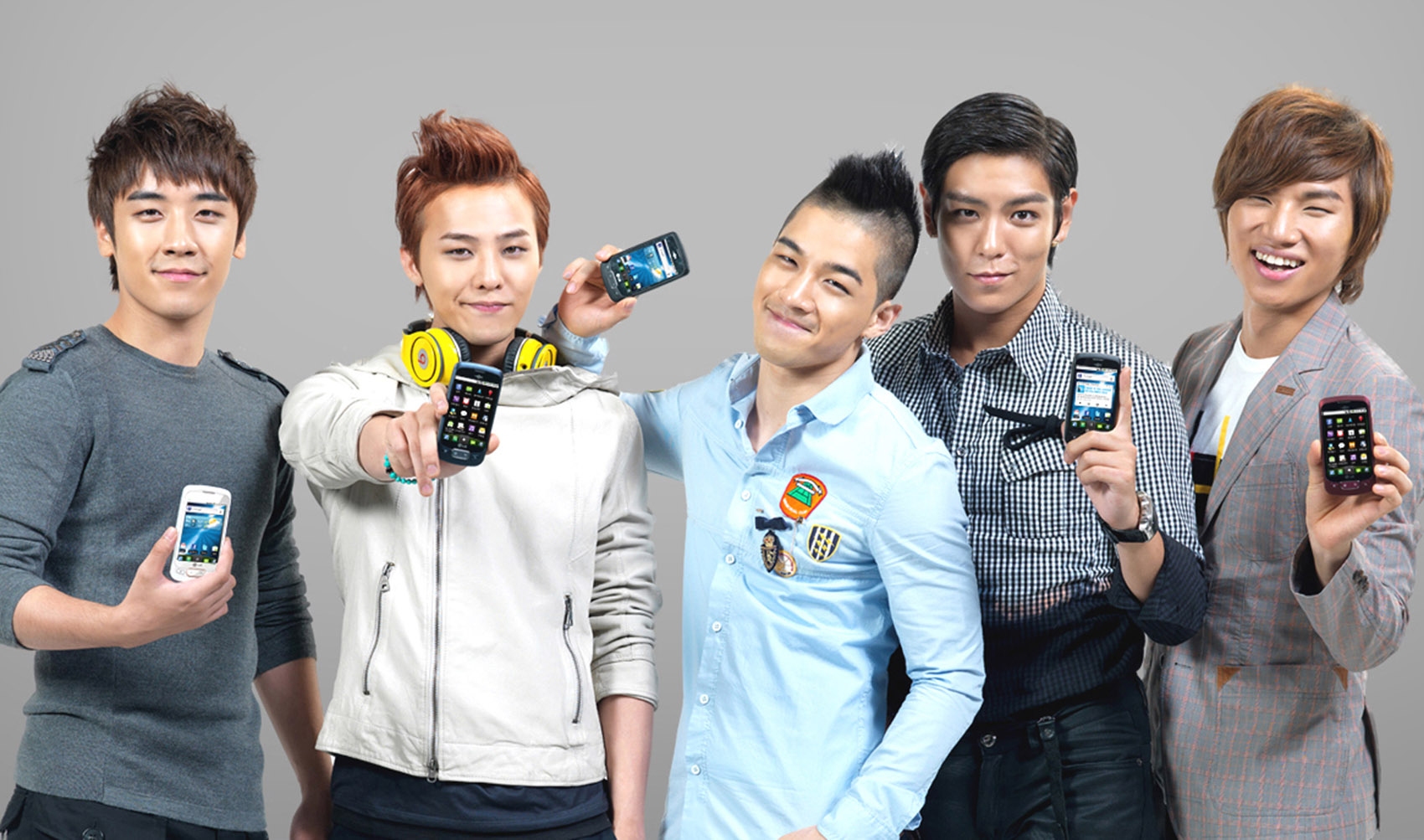
Two-time award winner BigBang, who won for "Love Song" (2011) and "Bae Bae" (2015)

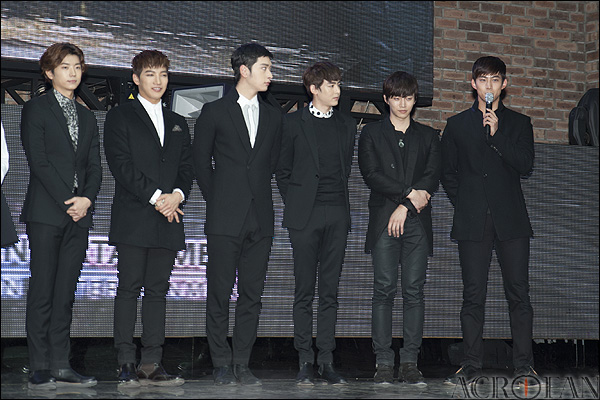
2PM won the award for "Go Crazy!" in 2014.

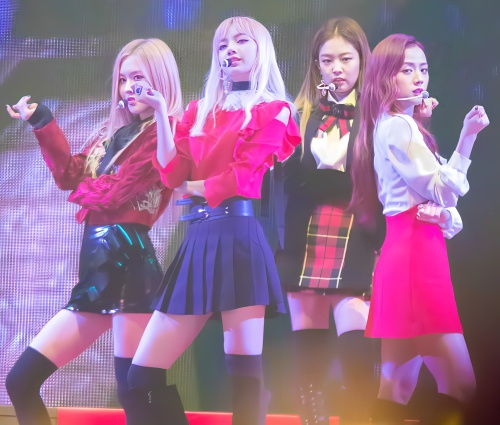
Blackpink won the 2016 award for "Whistle" and the 2022 award for "Pink Venom". Members Jisoo and Jennie won the 2023 award for "Flower" and the 2025 award for "Zen" respectively.

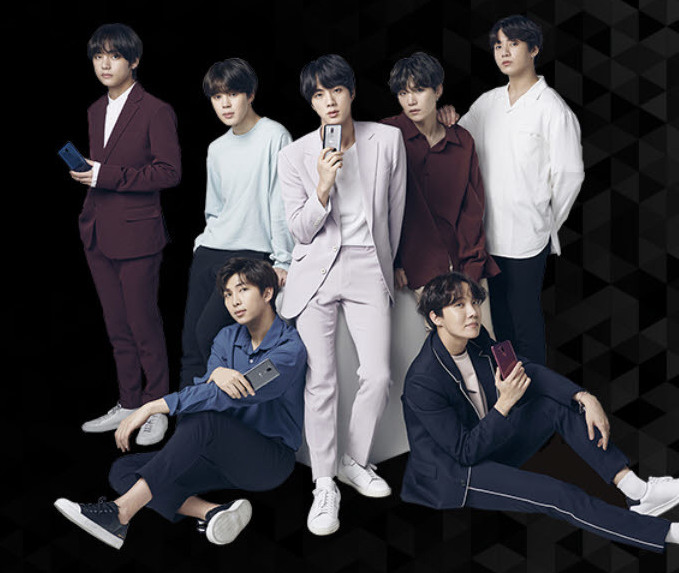
BTS has received the award for five consecutive years from 2017 to 2021.

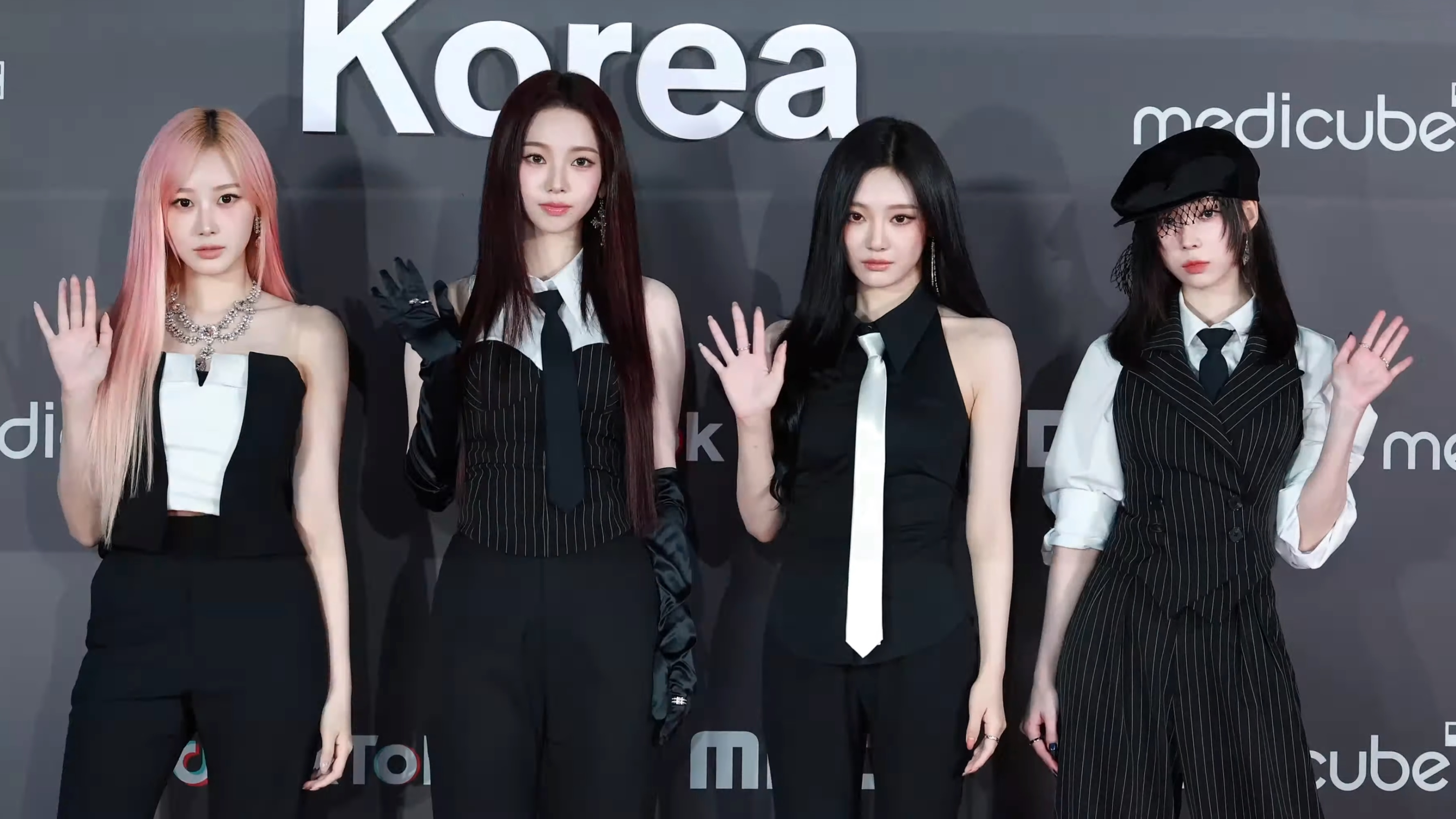
Aespa won the 2024 award for "Armageddon".

=== Music Video of the Year (daesang) ===
From 1999–2005, the category was titled "Music Video of the Year" and was one of the ceremony's two daesang prizes. The event went through several name changes during this time period: "Mnet Video Music Awards" (1999), "Mnet Music Video Festival" (2000–2003), and "Mnet KM Music Video Festival" (2004–2005). No list of nominees was made available for the former daesang during the course of its existence.

List of "Music Video of the Year" (daesang) winners
Year (Note: Each year is linked to the article about the annual ceremony held that year.)	Winner(s)	Music video	Ref.
1999 (1st)	Lee Seung-hwan	"A Request"	
2000 (2nd)	Jo Sungmo	"Do You Know"	
2001 (3rd)	Wax	"Fix My Makeup"	
2002 (4th)	Cho PD	"My Style"	
2003 (5th)	Big Mama	"Break Away"	
2004 (6th)	BoA	"My Name"	
2005 (7th)	Drunken Tiger	"Isolated Ones! Left Foot Forward!"	

=== Best Music Video ===
Starting in 2006, the former category's daesang status was dropped and it was instead retitled "Best Music Video". From 2006 to 2008, the event was renamed the "Mnet KM Music Festival" (MKMF). From 2009 onwards, it has been officially called the "Mnet Asian Music Awards" (MAMA).

List of "Best Music Video" winners and nominees
Year	Winner(s)	Music video	Nominee(s)	Ref.
2006 (8th)	Psy	"Entertainer"	Dynamic Duo – "Go Back"; Vibe – "The Man The Woman"; Rain – "I'm Coming"; YB – "Today"	
2007 (9th)	Dynamic Duo	"Attendance Check"	Kim Sa-rang – "Consolation"; Leessang – "Ballerino" (featuring Ali); Miro Band – "Mama"; Dynamic Duo – "Complex"	
2008 (10th)	Wonder Girls	"Nobody"	Dynamic Duo – "Solo"; Uhm Jung-hwa – "Disco" (featuring T.O.P); Epik High – "One" (featuring Ji Sun); Taeyang – "Prayer"	
2009 (11th)	2NE1	"Fire"	Dienji – "Step 2 Me"; Leessang – "Girl Who Can't Break Up, Boy Who Can't Leave" (featuring Jung Min); Bada – "Mad" featuring Untouchable; Seo Taiji – "Juliet"	
2010 (12th)	2NE1	"Can't Nobody"	Epik High – "Run"; UV – "Sorry I Can't Be Cool"; Gain – "Irreversible"; Taeyang – "I'll Be There"	
2011 (13th)	BigBang	"Love Song"	Brown Eyed Girls – "Sixth Sense"; Kiha & The Faces – "Just Know Each Other"; Sunny Hill – "Midnight Circus"; UV – "Itaewon Freedom"	
2012 (14th)	Psy	"Gangnam Style"	BigBang – "Monster"; Gain – "Bloom"; Infinite – "The Chaser"; Naul – "Memory Of The Wind"	
2013 (15th)	G-Dragon	"Coup d'Etat"	Busker Busker – "First Love"; Cho Yong-pil – "Bounce"; Lee Seung-chul – "My Love"; Psy – "Gentleman"	
2014 (16th)	2PM	"Go Crazy!"	Block B – "Jackpot"; Seo Taiji – "Sogyeokdong"; Girls' Generation-TTS – "Holler"; Teen Top – "Missing"	
2015 (17th)	BigBang	"Bae Bae"	f(x) – "4 Walls"; Shinee – "Married to the Music"; Wonder Girls – "I Feel You"; Infinite – "Bad"	
2016 (18th)	Blackpink	"Whistle"	Dean – "Bonnie & Clyde"; Gain – "Carnival (The Last Day)"; BTS – "Blood Sweat & Tears"; Wonder Girls – "Why So Lonely"	
2017 (19th)	BTS	"Spring Day"	Exo – "Power"; Twice – "Signal"; Wanna One – "Energetic"; Seventeen – "Don't Wanna Cry"	
2018 (20th)	BTS	"Idol"	Blackpink – "Ddu-Du Ddu-Du"; Twice – "What Is Love?"; Wanna One – "Beautiful"; Shinee – "Good Evening"	
2019 (21st)	BTS	"Boy with Luv" (feat. Halsey)	No nominees announced	
2020 (22nd)	BTS	"Dynamite"	No nominees announced	
2021 (23rd)	BTS	"Butter"	No nominees announced	
2022 (24th)	Blackpink	"Pink Venom"	No nominees announced	
2023 (25th)	Jisoo	"Flower"	(G)I-dle – "Queencard"; Ive – "I Am"; Jungkook – "Seven" (featuring Latto); Seventeen – "Super"; Stray Kids – "S-Class"	
2024 (26th)	Aespa	"Armageddon"	IU – "Love Wins All"; Ive – "Heya"; K.Will – "No Sad Song for My Broken Heart"; Seventeen – "Maestro"	
2025 (27th)	Jennie	"Zen"	Aespa – "Dirty Work"; AllDay Project – "Famous"; Blackpink – "Jump"; Lee Chan-hyuk – "Vivid LaLa Love"	

== Artists with multiple wins ==
5 wins

- BTS

2 wins

- BigBang
- Psy
- 2NE1
- Blackpink

== Artists with multiple nominations ==
6 nominations

- BTS

4 nominations

- Blackpink
- Dynamic Duo

3 nominations

- BigBang
- Gain
- Psy
- Seventeen
- Wonder Girls

2 nominations

- 2NE1
- Aespa
- Epik High
- Infinite
- Leessang
- Seo Taiji
- Shinee
- Taeyang
- Twice
- UV
- Wanna One
