= Be Like... =

Studio album by Kim Gun-mo
- Released: June 17, 2005
- Genres: R&B; soul; blues
- Producers: Choi Jun-young; Kim Gun-mo

Kim Gun-mo chronology
Kimgunmo. 9 (2004)	Be Like... (2005)	Style Album 11 (2007)

Be Like... is the tenth studio album by South Korean singer Kim Gun-mo. It was released on June 17, 2005.

== Background ==
Kim Gun-mo debuted in 1992 with the album Sleepless Rainy Night, and became known as a "hit maker" through his albums' consecutive successes. In late 2003, Kim had announced that he would stop appearing on TV and only promote his ninth album through live concerts. However, the album performed worse than his other albums commercially, with under 100,000 copies sold. During his rest period, he watched the film Ray, a biography of American musician Ray Charles, and was touched by subtitles that read, "Over the next 40 years, he went on to have many hit songs." Kim Gun-mo stated to The Chosun Ilbo in 2005, "Not just Ray Charles, but dozens of foreign R&B and soul musicians write and sing songs for 40 years, 50 years, even until they die, and I thought, 'Have I become this lazy just over 10 years...'". In March 2005, Kim announced he would return to TV with his tenth album, which was to release around April or May.

== Release and promotion ==
Be Like was originally set to release in April or May, according to an article from March 2005. On May 23, 2005, two songs from the album were pre-released to several music sites, where users were given a chance to vote for which song they thought would succeed. Through the process, "We Are Strangers Now" and "The Moon of Seoul" were chosen as the album's lead singles. From June 17 to 18, Kim held a concert commemorating the release of Be Like, the funds from which were to be donated to help visually impaired children. His first TV appearance after the album's release was on M Countdown, on June 23, 2005. In September, it was announced that "Toe" would serve as the follow-up song to "We Are Strangers Now" and "The Moon of Seoul".

=== Music videos ===
The music video for "The Moon of Seoul" was released online and to television on June 16, 2005. Shot in Gangnam, it features Ahn Jae-wook, who had previously appeared in the video for Kim Gun-mo's "I'm Sorry", and Seo Jin-ho, who had starred along Ahn in various movies. An Ju-hee appeared in the video for "We Are Strangers Now", while weather presenter Ahn Hye-kyeong made a cameo in "Some Days After", which also starred actress Song Li-woo.

== Critical reception ==
Be Like received mixed reception from various critics. Writing for the webzine IZM in 2004, Shin Hye-rim acknowledged the attempted change in style, but opined that those attempts did not fit with its other, more standard numbers, which made it feel unfinished. Baek Seung-chan of the Kyunghyang Shinmun additionally opined that the two lead singles were not fit for the position, and that Kim's songs "had not broken away from 90s nightclub music". Conversely, music critic Seong Jin-woo wrote that there was an effort to distinctify the release from his other output, but that his "wit remains" in regards to songs like "We Are Strangers Now". In 2016, HiphopLE selected it as one of the 50 best Korean R&B albums from the 1990s and 2000s; Shim Eun-bo stated that Be Like was "convincing in saying that it was influenced by Ray Charles", and highlighted "We Are Strangers Now" with its "brass band composition, swing rhythm, and scat".

== Track listing ==
All lyrics are written by Choi Jun-young, except where noted.

No.	Title	Music	Length
1.	"We Are Strangers Now" (남이야)	Choi Jun-young	3:47
2.	"The Moon of Seoul" (서울의 달)	Kim Gun-mo	3:41
3.	"Habit" (습관)	PJ	3:47
4.	"Toe" (발가락)	Im Ki-hoon	4:09
5.	"Toad" (두꺼비)	Kim Gun-mo	3:59
6.	"Some Days After" (하루, 이틀, 사흘, 나흘)	Hwang Chan-hui	3:45
7.	"Love Me" (내게도 사랑이; Ham Joong-ah)	Ham Joong-ah	3:40
8.	"Free Life" (대충 살아요)	Kim Gun-mo	3:04
9.	"Wandering" (방랑; Kim Jin-man)	Im Ki-hoon	3:54
10.	"I Feel Good"	Im Ki-hoon	4:09
