= Jo Sung-mo =

South Korean singer

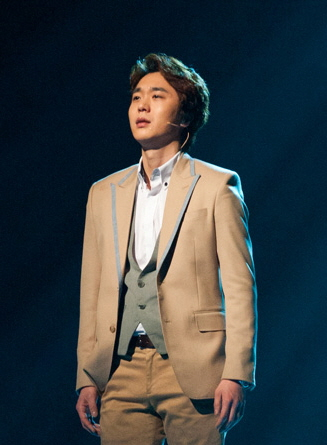
- Jo in 2012

Background information
- Born: March 11, 1977 (age 49)
- Origin: South Korea
- Genre: Pop ballad
- Occupation: Singer
- Years active: 1998–present

Korean name
- Hangul: 조성모
- Hanja: 曺誠模
- RR: Jo Seongmo
- MR: Cho Sŏngmo

Jo Sung-mo (Korean: 조성모; born March 11, 1977) is a South Korean pop ballad singer. He debuted in 1998 with the album To Heaven, and went on to release several of the all-time best-selling albums in South Korea.

== Biography ==
Jo Sung Mo was born in Seoul in 1977.

Shortly after high school, he was part of a dance group called 4004 (also called 4Angels). The dance group never had an official debut before disbanding.

Jo Sung Mo debuted in September 1998. He chose an unconventional method of releasing no information about the album or himself featuring actors (Lee Byeong Heon and Kim Ha Neul) in his debut instead of personally appearing in the video. It became known as the "mysterious concept".

His gamble paid off, and he became widely popular. Listed as one of the top sellers of Korean albums of all time, he earned the title "Crown Prince of Ballads".

Jo Sung Mo entered mandatory enlistment on March 30, 2006, and completed his service on May 23, 2008.

Jo Sung Mo got married in 2010 to former model and designer, Goo Min Ji. They met in 2007 and dated for 3 years prior. They had their first child, a boy, on October 26, 2015.

His fan club goes by the name Sungmo Maria.

== Controversy ==
In 2015, Jo was taken to court over breech of contract and substandard performances for his 2014–2015 concert tour. He was originally agreed to hold 18 concerts, but he stopped after 16 due to a discrepancy with the performance agency over money. On October 25, 2015, the Seoul Central District Court ruled against Jo and ordered him to pay 100 million won ($890,000 US) to the production house.

== Discography ==
=== Studio albums ===
Title	Album details	Peak chart positions	Sales
Title	Album details	KOR	Sales
To Heaven	Released: September 4, 1998; Label: GM (지엠); Formats: CD, cassette	4	KOR: 775,126+
For Your Soul	Released: September 1, 1999; Label: GM; Formats: CD, cassette	1	KOR: 2,047,152+
Classic	Released: January 26, 2000; Label: GM; Formats: CD, cassette	2	KOR: 1,599,111+
Let Me Love	Released: September 1, 2000; Label: GM; Formats: CD, cassette	1	KOR: 2,042,096+
No More Love	Released: September 9, 2001; Label: GM; Formats: CD, cassette	1	KOR: 979,697
A Singer (歌人)	Released: March 10, 2003; Warner Music Korea; Label: Formats: CD, cassette	1	KOR: 374,572
My First	Released: February 2, 2005; Label: Warner Music Korea; Formats: CD, cassette	5	KOR: 155,523+
Classic 1+1 Grand Featuring	Released: November 8, 2005; Label: Heaven Entertainment; Formats: CD, cassette	1	KOR: 53,657+
Second Half	Released: April 9, 2009	—N/a*	—N/a*
*2009 data not available.

=== Compilation albums ===
Title	Album details	Peak chart positions	Sales
Title	Album details	KOR	Sales
Don't Forget To Remember	Released: October 10, 2002; Label: GM; Formats: CD, cassette	8	KOR: 97,771+
The Essential Jo Sung Mo	Released: June 25, 2014; Label: CJ E & M Music; Formats: CD, digital download	9	KOR: 1,929+

=== Extended plays ===
Title	Album details	Peak chart positions	Sales
Title	Album details	KOR	Sales
Meet Brave	Released: August 11, 2010; Label: CJ E & M Music; Formats: CD, digital download	3	—N/a*
Wind of Change	Released: March 24, 2014; Label: Synnara Music; Formats: CD, digital download	9	KOR: 2,200+
*2010 sales data not available.

== Filmography ==
=== Television ===
Year	Program name	Notes/Ref.
2009	Let's Go! Dream Team Season 2	Cast member
2012–13	The Last Audition of My Live	Singing competition judge
2013	Hidden Singer 2	Guest singer
2014	Final Adventure	Cast member
2015	Persevere, Goo Hae-Ra	Cameo
2016	Fantastic Duo	Guest singer

=== Film ===
- Taegukgi (2004) as a soldier of the North Korean People's Army (Cameo)

== Awards and nominations ==
=== Golden Disc Awards ===
Year	Category	Nominated work	Result	Ref.
1999	Album Grand Prize	For Your Soul	Won	
1999	Album Main Prize	For Your Soul	Won	
2000	Album Grand Prize	Let Me Love	Won	
2000	Album Main Prize	Let Me Love	Won	
2003	Album Grand Prize	A Singer	Won	
2003	Album Main Prize	A Singer	Won	
2005	Album Main Prize	My First	Won	

=== KBS Music Awards ===
Year	Category	Nominated work	Result	Ref.
1999	Best Song Award	"For Your Soul"	Won	

=== Mnet Asian Music Awards ===
Year	Category	Nominated work	Result	Ref.
1999	Best Ballad Performance	"For Your Soul"	Won	
1999	Best Male Artist	"For Your Soul"	Nominated	
2000	Music Video of the Year	"Do You Know"	Won	
2000	Best Male Artist	"Do You Know"	Nominated	
2000	Best Ballad Performance	"Do You Know"	Won	
2001	Best Male Artist	"Goodbye My Love"	Nominated	
2003	Best Male Artist	"Piano"	Nominated	
2003	Best Ballad Performance	"Piano"	Won	
2004	Best OST	"By Your Side" (Lovers in Paris OST)	Won	
2005	Best Male Artist	"Mr. Flower"	Nominated	

=== Seoul Music Awards ===
Year	Category	Nominated work	Result	Ref.
1998	New Artist Award	Not applicable	Won	
1999	Grand Prize	For Your Soul	Won	
1999	Main Prize	For Your Soul	Won	
2000	Grand Prize	Let Me Love	Won	
2000	Main Prize	Let Me Love	Won	

== See also ==
- List of best-selling albums in South Korea
