= MAMA Awards =

South Korean music awards

- Current: 2026 MAMA Awards
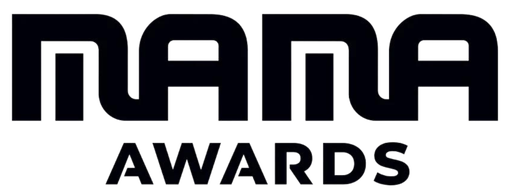
- Awarded for: Outstanding achievements in the K-pop and Asian music industry.
- Country: South Korea; Macau; Singapore; Hong Kong; Vietnam; Japan; United States
- Presented by: CJ ENM Entertainment Division (Mnet)
- First award: November 27, 1999; 26 years ago
- Website: Official website

Television/radio coverage
- Network: Mnet, across CJ ENM channels and other international networks

The MAMA Awards (Korean: 마마 어워즈, formerly Mnet Asian Music Awards) is a major music awards ceremony presented annually by entertainment company CJ ENM. First held in South Korea, the majority of prizes have been won by K-pop artists, although there are other Asian artists winning in various award categories, such as for Best Asian Artist and other professional-related awards.

The awards ceremony was first held in Seoul in 1999, being aired on Mnet. MAMA has also been held in various Asian countries and cities outside of South Korea since 2010 and now airs internationally online beyond Asia.

== History ==
The event was launched in 1999 as a music video awards ceremony, modeled after the MTV Video Music Awards, called the Mnet Music Video Festival. It merged with the KMTV Korean Music Awards in 2004 and was renamed the Mnet KM Music Video Festival. By the mid-2000s, the awards ceremony had attracted some international interest due to the spread of Hallyu, and it aired in China and Japan in 2008.

Mnet Asian Music Awards logo

In 2009, the event was renamed the Mnet Asian Music Awards (MAMA) to reflect its expansion outside of South Korea. In 2010, MAMA was held in Macau, marking the first time it was held outside of South Korea. The following year, in 2011, MAMA was held in Singapore, and was then held in Hong Kong from 2012 to 2017. In 2017, the awards ceremony was expanded to four nights, and parts of the event were held in Vietnam and Japan, in addition to Hong Kong. In 2018, MAMA had three parts and was held in three countries; South Korea hosted the MAMA for the first time in nine years, together with Japan and Hong Kong. In 2020, MAMA was held online only and took place in South Korea only due to the COVID-19 pandemic.

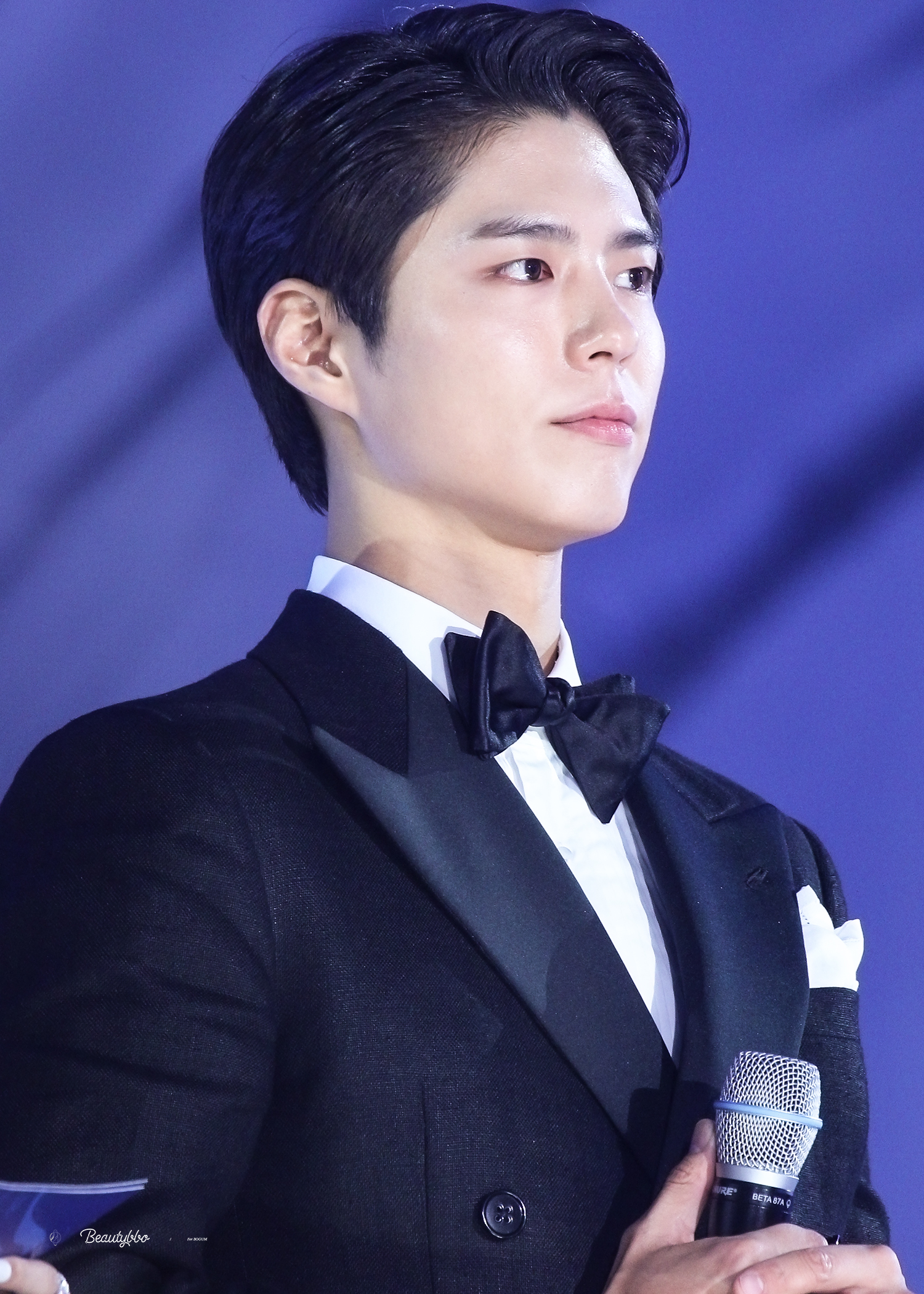
As of 2025, actor and singer Park Bo-gum has hosted the show seven times, including the 2024 awards in the United States — the first ceremony held outside of Asia

On July 20, 2021, it was reported by Ilgan Sports that the 2021 Mnet Asian Music Awards was undergoing discussion for the event to be held in Hong Kong despite the ongoing pandemic and travel restrictions. On August 23, 2022, CJ E&M announced that the event would be rebranded as simply the "MAMA Awards" going forward.

Actor and singer Park Bo-gum first hosted the show in 2017 and has hosted in 2018 and 2019. He returned to host from 2022 to 2025 and has been with the MAMA Awards through its rebranding and first foray into the United States. He has also hosted in Japan's three major domes: Nagoya, Osaka, and Tokyo Dome.

=== Timeline ===
- Mnet Video Music Awards (1999)
- Mnet Music Video Festival (2000–2003)
- Mnet KM Music Video Festival (2004–2005)
- Mnet KM Music Festival (2006–2008)
- Mnet Asian Music Awards (2009–2021)
- MAMA Awards (2022–present)

== List of ceremonies ==
=== As Mnet Video Music Awards ===
Year	Date	City	Venue	Host(s)
1999	November 27	Seoul	Universal Arts Center	Choi Hal-li

=== As Mnet Music Video Festival (MMF) ===
Year	Date	City	Venue	Host(s)
2000	November 24	Seoul	Universal Arts Center	Cha Tae-hyun and Kim Hyun-joo
2001	November 23	Seoul	Universal Arts Center	Cha Tae-hyun and Song Hye-kyo
2002	November 29	Seoul	Universal Arts Center	Shin Dong-yup and Kim Jung-eun
2003	November 27	Seoul	Kyung Hee University	Cha Tae-hyun and Sung Yu-ri

=== As Mnet KM Music Video Festival (MKMF) ===
Year	Date	City	Venue	Host(s)
2004	December 4	Seoul	Kyung Hee University	Shin Dong-yup and Kim Jung-eun
2005	November 27	Seoul	Olympic Gymnastics Arena	Shin Dong-yup and Kim Ah-joong

=== As Mnet KM Music Festival (MKMF) ===
Year	Date	City	Venue	Host(s)
2006	November 25	Seoul	Olympic Gymnastics Arena	Shin Dong-yup and Kim Ok-bin
2007	November 17	Seoul	Seoul Sports Complex	Shin Dong-yup and Lee Da-hae
2008	November 15	Seoul	Seoul Sports Complex	Rain

=== As Mnet Asian Music Awards (MAMA) ===
Year	Date	City	Venue	Host(s)
2009	November 21	Seoul	Seoul Sports Complex	Tiger JK
2010	November 28	Macau	Cotai Arena, The Venetian Macao	None
2011	November 29	Singapore	Singapore Indoor Stadium	Lee Byung-hun
2012	November 30	Hong Kong	Hong Kong Convention and Exhibition Centre	Song Joong-ki
2013	November 22	Hong Kong	AsiaWorld–Arena	Lee Seung-gi
2014	December 3	Hong Kong	AsiaWorld–Arena	Song Seung-heon
2015	December 2	Hong Kong	AsiaWorld–Arena	Psy
2016	December 2	Hong Kong	AsiaWorld–Arena	Lee Byung-hun
2017	November 25	Ho Chi Minh City	Hoa Binh Theatre	Thu Minh
2017	November 29	Yokohama	Yokohama Arena	Park Bo-gum
2017	November 30	Hong Kong	W Hong Kong	None
2017	December 1	Hong Kong	AsiaWorld–Arena	Song Joong-ki
2018	December 10	Seoul	Dongdaemun Design Plaza	Jung Hae-in
2018	December 12	Saitama	Saitama Super Arena	Park Bo-gum
2018	December 14	Hong Kong	AsiaWorld–Arena	Song Joong-ki
2019	December 4	Nagoya	Nagoya Dome	Park Bo-gum
2020	December 6	Paju	CJ E&M Contents World	Song Joong-ki
2021	December 11	Paju	CJ E&M Contents World	Lee Hyori

=== As MAMA Awards ===
Year	Date	City	Venue	Host(s)
2022	November 29–30	Osaka	Kyocera Dome	Jeon Somi and Park Bo-gum
2023	November 28–29	Tokyo	Tokyo Dome	Jeon Somi and Park Bo-gum
2024	November 21	Los Angeles	Dolby Theatre	Park Bo-gum
2024	November 22	Osaka	Kyocera Dome	Karina, Sung Han-bin, Rei, Yoshi
2024	November 23	Osaka	Kyocera Dome	Kim Tae-ri
2025	November 28–29	Hong Kong	Kai Tak Stadium	Park Bo-gum, Kim Hye-soo
2026	November 20–21	Osaka	Kyocera Dome	Park Bo-gum

== Award categories ==
=== Grand Prize ===
The four Grand Prize (Daesang):

- Artist of the Year
- Album of the Year
- Song of the Year
- Fan's Choice of the Year (since 2024, was known as Worldwide Icon of the Year from 2018 to 2023)

=== Competitive awards ===
Unless otherwise noted, each award category was introduced in 1999.

- Best Male Artist
- Best Female Artist
- Best Male Group (since 2000, was known as Best Group in 1999)
- Best Female Group (since 2000)
- Best New Artist
- Best Dance Performance
- Best Band Performance
- Best Rap Performance
- Best Vocal Performance (since 2010)
- Best Collaboration (2010, 2012, 2014–2017, 2019–present)
- Best OST (2004–2006, 2008–2009, 2011–2014, 2016–present)
- Best Music Video (since 2006)
- Best Choreography (since 2024)

=== Special awards ===
These awards have been given once or occasionally.

- Best International Artist (1999–2006, 2009–2010, 2012–2014, 2019, 2021)
- Best Asian Artist (since 2004)
- Other special awards

=== Discontinued awards ===
- Music Video of the Year (1999–2005)
  (former daesang award and currently Best Music Video since 2006)
- Best Popular Music Video (1999–2005)
  (former daesang award)
- Best Music Video Performance (2005–2007)
- Best Music Video Director (1999–2006)
- Best Mixed Group (2000–2009)
- Best Ballad Performance (1999–2009)
- Best R&B Performance (2000–2007)
- Best Indie Performance (1999–2002)
- Best House & Electronic Performance (2007–2009)
- Best Trot Performance (2009)
- Best Digital Single (2010)
- Best Unit (2018)

== Most wins ==
=== Grand Prize ===
The following lists the artist(s) who received two or more Grand Prize (Daesang) as of 2025.
(Includes Artist of the Year, Album of the Year, Song of the Year, and Worldwide Icon of the Year)

Record set	Artist(s)	First year awarded	Recent year awarded (Note: Artists with the most awards and the most recent year awarded are listed first.)
23	BTS	2016	2026
6	Exo	2013	2017
5	Big Bang	2008	2015
4	2NE1	2009	2011
3	Super Junior	2007	2012
3	Twice	2016	2018
3	Seventeen	2023	2024
3	G-Dragon	2009	2025
2	H.O.T.	1999	2000
2	BoA	2002	2004
2	SG Wannabe	2006	2006
2	TVXQ	2005	2008
2	NewJeans	2023	2023

=== Most awarded overall ===
Record set	Artist(s)
57	BTS
24	Seventeen
19	Twice
16	Exo
13	Big Bang
13	Super Junior
12	IU
12	Aespa
11	Blackpink
11	TVXQ
10	2NE1
10	Psy
10	Shinhwa

== Controversies ==
=== Boycotting incidents ===
In 2007, Lee Min-woo and Shin Hye-sung from the group Shinhwa canceled their appearance at the event one hour before the awards ceremony began. Shin later said they left because they did not trust the event to fairly select winners.

In 2009, entertainment companies Inwoo Production and SM Entertainment boycotted the 2009 awards ceremony with none of their artists attending. Both companies said the reason for their boycott was that they questioned the fairness of the voting process. In particular, SM Entertainment said that Girls' Generation had held the #1 spot on a music chart for nine consecutive weeks, but the group never won first place on Mnet's weekly M Countdown music show. The company also criticized a mobile poll which required participants to pay money in order to vote. In 2010, SM Entertainment artists also did not attend the year's awards ceremony.

=== Voter fraud ===
Prior to the 2017 awards ceremony, Mnet found that some fans had cast fraudulent votes through the use of bots. As a result, Mnet temporarily halted voting, then nullified all fraudulent votes, blocked relevant IP addresses, and deleted relevant user accounts.

== Broadcasting ==
The ceremony broadcasts live worldwide via Mnet, TVING, tvN Asia, Mnet Japan, Mnet Smart+, other CJ ENM channels, and YouTube through Mnet K-POP, Mnet TV, M2, and KCON channels.

Other broadcasters that also broadcast the event includes au Smart Pass, Far EasTone Mobile Circle app & friDay Video, MeWATCH, tonton, FPT Play, JOOX, ViuTV, Channel U, TV5, Smart Livestream, Indosiar, and Vidio.
