= Lee Soo-young =

South Korean singer (born 1979)

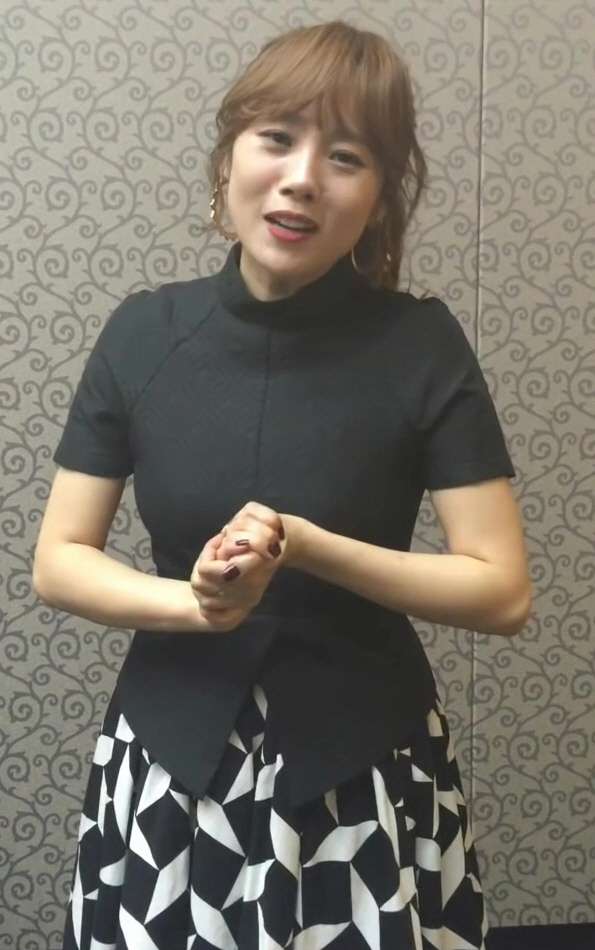
- Lee in 2015

Background information
- Born: Lee Ji-yeon; April 12, 1979 (age 47); Bongcheon-dong, Gwanak District, Seoul, South Korea
- Genres: K-pop; ballad
- Occupation: Singer
- Years active: 1999–present
- Label: New Era Project
- Spouse: Unknown (m. 2010)

Korean name
- Hangul: 이지연
- Hanja: 李知姸
- RR: I Jiyeon
- MR: I Chiyŏn

Stage name
- Hangul: 이수영
- Hanja: 李秀英
- RR: I Suyeong
- MR: I Suyŏng

Lee Soo-young (Korean: 이수영; born Lee Ji-yeon, 이지연on April 12, 1979) is a South Korean ballad singer. She debuted in 1999 with the hit album, I Believe, and quickly gained popularity due to her strong singing skills. During the mid-2000s, Lee was one of South Korea's best-selling singers, selling more than 700,000 albums in 2004 alone despite a recession in the music industry at the time.

== Career ==
In 2001, she sang the official Korean version of the Final Fantasy X song "Suteki Da Ne" in Korean, titled "얼마나 좋을까" ("Eolmana Joheulkka").

She released her seventh album, Grace, on January 21, 2006. It performed very well, able to shoot straight to the top of the charts. The popularity of the album led to a limited edition (repackage) release of Grace, of which only 30,000 copies were produced.

Lee has performed the new song written by her titled "Lavender" from her new album at the wedding ceremony of her close friend, Park Kyung-lim, Kim Yoo-mi, Seo Min-jung.

== Personal life ==
Lee married her boyfriend of one year in October 2010. They have one son, who was born in July 2011.

== Discography ==
=== Studio albums ===
Title	Album details	Peak chart positions	Sales
Title	Album details	KOR	Sales
I Believe	Released: November 12, 1999; Label: Yiga Entertainment; Format: CD, cassette	8	KOR: 169,748
Never Again	Released: February 8, 2001; Label: Yiga Entertainment; Format: CD, cassette	32	KOR: 178,990
Made In Winter	Released: December 11, 2001; Label: Yiga Entertainment; Format: CD, cassette	7	KOR: 263,917
My Stay In Sendai	Released: September 11, 2002; Label: Yiga Entertainment; Format: CD, cassette	4	KOR: 504,656
This Time	Released: August 21, 2003; Label: Sony Music; Format: CD, cassette	3	KOR: 435,904
The Colors Of My Life	Released: September 10, 2004; Label: Yiga Entertainment; Format: CD, cassette	1	KOR: 343,724
Grace	Released: January 20, 2006; Label: Recode Entertainment; Format: CD, cassette	1	KOR: 212,191
Set It Down (내려놓음)	Released: September 12, 2007; Label: Have Entertainment; Format: CD, cassette	2	KOR: 64,115
Dazzle	Released: October 15, 2009; Label: KT Music; Format: CD, digital download	—	—N/a
Sory	Released: May 17, 2022; Label: New Era Project; Format: CD, digital download	78	—N/a
* Data not available for 2009.

=== Live and compilation albums ===
Title	Album details	Peak chart positions	Sales
Title	Album details	KOR	Sales
Thank Her (그녀에게 감사해요) live album	Released: September 17, 2001; Label: Yiga Entertainment; Format: CD, cassette	34	KOR: 16,886
Sweet Holiday in Lombok compilation album	Released: January 23, 2003; Label: Yiga Entertainment; Format: CD, cassette	3	KOR: 227,636
Classic: The Remake Album cover album	Released: January 12, 2004; Label: Yiga Entertainment; Format: CD, cassette	2	KOR: 380,868
As Time Goes By compilation album	Released: January 13, 2005; Label: Yiga Entertainment; Format: CD, cassette	—	—N/a
An Autumn Day Japanese compilation album	Released: October 20, 2005; Label: Fantom Entertainment; Format: CD, cassette	7	KOR: 44,361
Classic: The 2nd Remake Album cover album	Released: March 28, 2013; Label: Cornerstone; Format: CD, digital download	—	—N/a
White Heart Baekgu (하얀마음 백구) with Jang Sook Hee, original soundtrack album	Released: December 7, 2016; Label: Hollywood Manor; Format: CD, digital download	—	—N/a
"—" denotes releases that did not chart or were not released in that region.

=== Extended plays ===
- Once (Released: November 13, 2008)

=== Singles ===
Title	Year	Album
"I Believe"	1999	I Believe
"Goodbye My Love"	1999	I Believe
"Never Again"	2001	Never Again
"Goodbye As I Pass You By" (스치듯 안녕)	2001	Never Again
"And I Love You" (그리고 사랑해)	2001	Made in Winter
"I'd Rather" (차라리)	2001	Made in Winter
"Lalala" (라라라)	2002	My Stay In Sendai
"Debt" (빚)	2002	My Stay In Sendai
"Solitary" (덩그러니)	2003	This Time
"Still Biting My Lips" (여전히 입술을 깨물죠)	2003	This Time
"Whistling" (휠릴리)	2004	The Colors of My Life
"Andante"	2004	The Colors of My Life
"Grace"	2006	Grace
"Cold" (시린)	2006	Grace
"Bobbed Hair" (단발머리)	2007	Set It Down
"Don't Know Men" (남자를 모르고)	2007	Set It Down
"What Love Is" (무슨 사랑이 그래요) (with Baek Chan of 8Eight)	2008	Non-album single
"Woman Like This" (이런 여자)	2008	Once
"Jiulkkeoya" (지울꺼야)	2009	Non-album single
"Don't Call My Name" (내 이름 부르지마)	2009	Dazzle
"Find Me" (날 찾아)	2020	Non-album single
"Sore" (덧)	2022	Sory
"Uranus" (천왕성)	2022	Sory

=== Soundtrack appearances ===
Title	Year	Peak chart positions	Album
Title	Year	KOR	Album
"A Love to Kill" (이 죽일 놈의 사랑)	2005	—	A Love to Kill OST
"Crazy For You" (사랑에 미치다)	2007	—	Crazy For You OST
"Fox" (여우랍니다)	2009	—	Queen of Housewives OST
"Time, Please Slow Down" (시간아 제발...천천히 가줘)	2010	64	The Great Merchant OST
"The Road That Only We Know" (우리 둘만 아는 길)	2012	55	Man from the Equator OST
"Tears Fall Because I Miss You" (그리워서 눈물나서)	2012	73	Phantom OST
"Nice Girl" (착한 여자)	2012	27	The Innocent Man OST
"Will It Reach You" (닿을 수 있나요)	2013	45	Jang Ok-jung, Living by Love OST
"Love in Memory 2" (러브 인 메모리 2)	2014	98	Love in Memory 2 OST
"Can't Love You" (사랑 못해)	2019	—	My Only One OST
"Shine Bright" (찬란하게 빛날 거예요)	2020	—	Kkondae Intern OST
"The Look of Time" (시간의 표정)	2022	—	Never Give Up OST
"—" denotes releases that did not chart or were not released in that region.

== Filmography ==
=== TV series ===
- The Accidental Couple (KBS2, 2009) as Jo Seung-eun

=== Film ===
- The Quiz Show Scandal (2010) as the radio singer

=== Variety show ===
Year	Network	Title	Role	Notes/Ref.
2021	B tv Cable	Healing Mountain Lodge 2	Host	
2021	MBN	Chosun Panstar	judge	
2020	JTBC	Two Yoo Project Sugar Man 3	Contestant	Episode 13 (2020.02.28)
2016	SBS TV	Fantastic Duo	Contestant	Episodes 11 & 12 (2016.06.26 & 2016.07.03)
2015	MBC	King of Mask Singer	Contestant	Episode 37 and 38 (with the stage name "The Goddess of Beauty Aphrodite Playing A Harp")
2015	KBS2	1 vs. 100	Contestant	2015.11.24
2014	KBS World	Immortal Songs: Singing the Legend	Contestant	2014.08.09
2013	JTBC	Hidden Singer	Contestant	Episode 5 - Season 1 (2013.03.30)
2009	KBS2	Happy Together	Guest	Episode 105 - Season 3 (2009.07.16)
2006	SBS	X-Man	Guest	Episode 118 to 126

== Awards and nominations ==
Award ceremony	Year	Category	Nominee/work	Result	Ref.
Golden Disc Awards	2002	Album Bonsang	My Stay in Sendai	Won	
Golden Disc Awards	2003	Album Bonsang	This Time	Won	
Golden Disc Awards	2004	Album of the Year (Daesang)	The Colors Of My Life	Won	
Golden Disc Awards	2004	Album Bonsang	The Colors Of My Life	Won	
Mnet Music Video Festival	1999	Best New Solo Artist	"I Believe"	Nominated	
Mnet Music Video Festival	2002	Best Ballad Performance	"Lalala"	Won	
Mnet Music Video Festival	2002	Best Female Artist	"Lalala"	Nominated	
Mnet Music Video Festival	2003	Best Female Artist	"Solitary"	Won	
Mnet Music Video Festival	2003	Best Ballad Performance	"Solitary"	Nominated	
Mnet Music Video Festival	2004	Best Female Video	"Whistle to Me"	Won	
Mnet Music Video Festival	2004	Best Ballad Video	"Whistle to Me"	Nominated	
Mnet Music Video Festival	2004	Best Female Artist	"Grace"	Nominated	
Mnet Music Video Festival	2004	Best Ballad Performance	"Grace"	Nominated	
MBC Top 10 Singers Festival	2002	Top 10 Singer Award (Bonsang)	Lee Soo-young	Won	
MBC Top 10 Singers Festival	2003	Grand Prize (Daesang)	"Solitary"	Won	
MBC Top 10 Singers Festival	2003	Top 10 Singer Award (Bonsang)	Lee Soo-young	Won	
MBC Top 10 Singers Festival	2004	Grand Prize (Daesang)	"Whistle to Me"	Won	
MBC Top 10 Singers Festival	2004	Top 10 Singer Award (Bonsang)	Lee Soo-young	Won	
SBS Gayo Daejeon	2002	Main Prize (Bonsang)	Lee Soo-young	Won	
SBS Gayo Daejeon	2003	Main Prize (Bonsang)	Lee Soo-young	Won	
SBS Gayo Daejeon	2004	Main Prize (Bonsang)	Lee Soo-young	Won	
Seoul Music Awards	2002	Main Prize (Bonsang)	Lee Soo-young	Won	
Seoul Music Awards	2004	Main Prize (Bonsang)	Lee Soo-young	Won	
