= Universal Arts Center =

Auditorium in Seoul, South Korea

Universal Arts Center (Korean: 유니버설아트센터), is a performing arts venue in Seoul, South Korea, established in 1981. It was formerly known as Little Angels Arts Center. Universal Ballet performs their ballets there.
