= Lee Seung-hwan =

South Korean singer

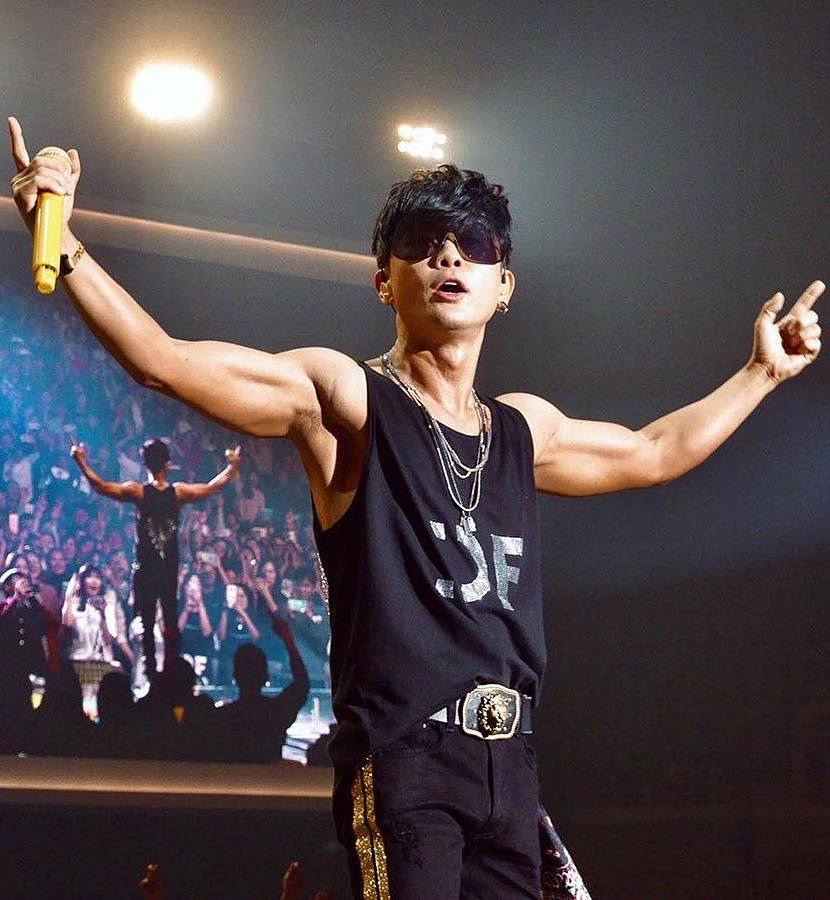
- Lee in 2019 No Enemy Legend Tour

Background information
- Born: December 13, 1965 (age 60)
- Origin: Busan, South Korea
- Genres: Pop ballad, rock
- Occupations: Singer-songwriter; record producer
- Years active: 1989–present
- Label: Dream Factory
- Website: df.co.kr

Korean name
- Hangul: 이승환
- Hanja: 李承桓
- RR: I Seunghwan
- MR: I Sŭnghwan

Lee in 2007

Lee Seung-hwan (Korean: 이승환; born December 13, 1965) is a South Korean singer and record producer known as the country's "King of Live Performances" for his frequent solo concerts. Lee debuted in 1989 as a pop ballad singer and later incorporated rock elements into his music. He has released numerous hit songs and is the president and founder of South Korean entertainment agency Dream Factory.

== Personal life ==
Lee was born in Busan, South Korea, and attended Whimoon High School in Seoul.

He was married to actress Chae Rim from 2003 until their divorce in 2006.

== Career ==
Lee has released more than 10 different singles, albums and EPs that reached number one. This commercial success was repeated in South Korea; his own company, Dream Factory, estimated that he has sold over 10 million records, including singles. Lee is a first musician as a president of his company. His debut album, "...B.C 603" propelled him to stardom on October 15, 1989. He won the New Artist's Gold Disc in 1991. He has held more 1000 solo concerts and those concerts have been contributed to develop Korea pop-culture.

"Chakage Salja (Korean: 착하게 살자; lit, Let's Live a Good Life)" is a fund-raising concert which Lee hosts every year. Part of the money raised goes to Korean Childhood Leukemia Foundation.

== Activism ==
Lee supported protests calling for the impeachment of President Yoon Suk Yeol over his declaration of martial law in December 2024. Lee has called members of the People Power Party “accomplices to rebellion” for boycotting the impeachment vote in the National Assembly on 7 December. He has also donated 12.13 million won ($8,468) to a civic group organizing pro-impeachment candlelight rallies and has rewrote some of his songs for impeachment-themed rallies.

== Discography ==
=== Studio albums ===
Title	Album details	Peak chart positions		Sales
Title	Album details	KOR RIAK	KOR Gaon	Sales
B.C 603	Released: October 15, 1989; Label: Seorabeol Record Co.; Format: CD, cassette	—N/a	—N/a	—N/a
Always	Released: July 15, 1991; Label: Woori Management; Format: CD, cassette	—N/a	—N/a	—N/a
My Story	Released: September 1, 1993; Label: Dream Factory; Format: CD, cassette	—N/a	—N/a	—N/a
Human	Released: June 1, 1995; Label: Dream Factory; Format: CD, cassette	—N/a	—N/a	—N/a
Cycle	Released: January 1, 1997; Label: Dream Factory; Format: CD, cassette	—N/a	—N/a	—N/a
The War in Life	Released: March 2, 1999; Label: Dream Factory; Format: CD, cassette	2	—N/a	KOR: 404,430
Egg: Sunny Side Up	Released: December 14, 2001; Label: Dream Factory; Format: CD, cassette	3	—N/a	KOR: 278,574
Karma	Released: October 8, 2004; Label: Dream Factory; Format: CD, cassette	4	—N/a	KOR: 97,427
Hwantastic	Released: November 10, 2006; Label: Dream Factory; Format: CD	2	—N/a	KOR: 51,758
Dreamizer	Released: May 26, 2010; Label: Dream Factory; Format: CD, digital download	—N/a	1	KOR: 18,371
Fall To Fly Part 1 (Fall To Fly 前)	Released: March 26, 2014; Label: Dream Factory; Format: CD, digital download	—N/a	2	KOR: 26,165
Fall To Fly Part 2 (Fall To Fly 後)	Released: October 15, 2019; Label: Dream Factory; Format: CD, digital download	—N/a	11	KOR: 7,965

=== Extended plays ===
Title	Album details	Peak chart positions	Sales
Title	Album details	KOR Gaon	Sales
3+3	Released: October 1, 2015; Label: Dream Factory; Format: CD, digital download	5	KOR: 9,217

== Filmography ==
=== Television shows ===
Year	Title	Network	Role	Notes	Ref.
2022	Youth Star	Channel A	Youth mentor	—N/a	

== Awards and nominations ==
=== Golden Disc Awards ===
Year	Category	Nominated work	Result	Ref.
1991	Main Prize	"My Heart Will Be With You"	Won	
1992	Main Prize	"Heart For One" with Oh Tae-ho	Won	
1993	Main Prize	"To Me"	Won	

=== Mnet Asian Music Awards ===
Year	Category	Nominated work	Result	Ref.
1999	Best Male Artist	"A Request"	Won	
1999	Music Video of the Year	"A Request"	Won	
1999	Best Ballad Performance	"A Request"	Nominated	
2000	Best Male Artist	"Live A Long Long Time"	Nominated	
2000	Best Ballad Performance	"Live A Long Long Time"	Nominated	
2002	Best Male Artist	"Mistake" (잘못)	Nominated	
2002	Special Jury Prize	"Mistake" (잘못)	Nominated	
2002	Music Video Pioneer Award	—N/a	Won	
2003	Best Ballad Performance	"Flower"	Nominated	
