= List of awards and nominations received by Infinite =

Infinite awards and nominations
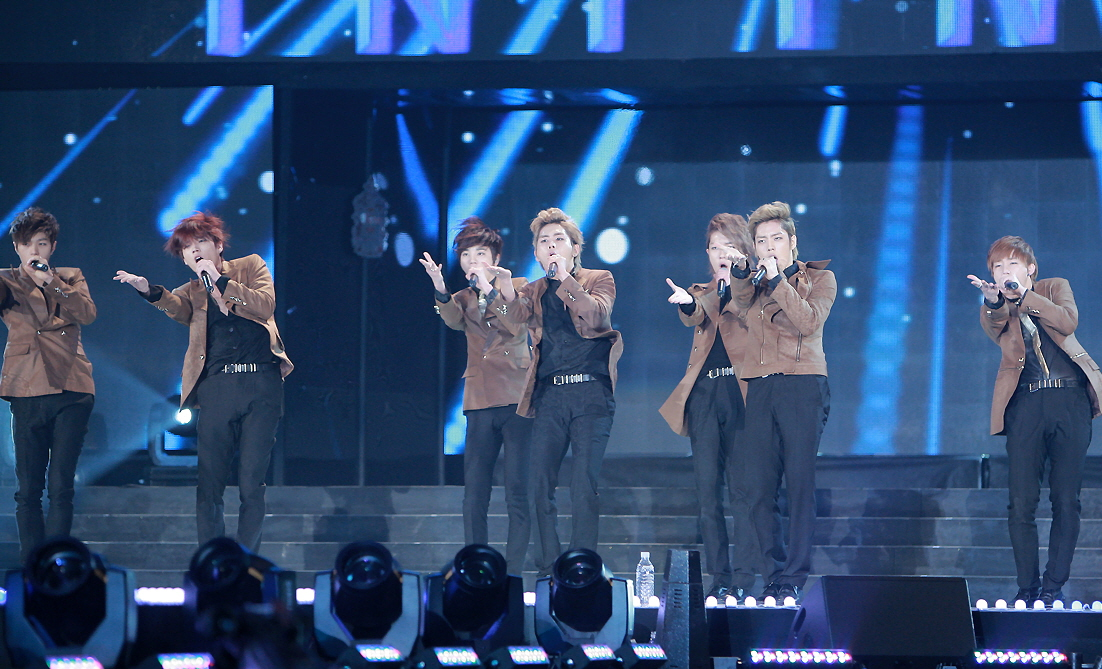
- Infinite in 2012
Awards and nominations
Award	Wins	Nominations
Gaon Chart Music Awards	1	2
Golden Disc Awards	7	13
Korean Music Awards	2	4
Melon Music Awards	1	3
Mnet 20's Choice Awards	1	2
Mnet Asian Music Awards	4	19
Seoul Music Awards	3	7
Other awards	15	18

Totals (Note: Certain award groups do not simply award one winner. They acknowledge several different recipients, have runners-up, and have third place. Since this is a specific recognition and is different from losing an award, runner-up mentions are considered wins in this award tally. For simplification and to avoid errors, each award in this list has been presumed to have had a prior nomination.)
- Wins: 33
- Nominations: 67

This is a list of awards and nominations received by Infinite, a South Korean boy group that debuted on 9 June 2010 under Woollim Entertainment.

== Awards and nominations ==
Name of the award ceremony, year presented, category, nominee(s) of the award, and the result of the nomination
Award ceremony	Year	Category	Nominee / work	Result	Ref.
Asia Artist Awards	2016	Most Popular Artists (Singer) – Top 50	Infinite	10th	
Gaon Chart Music Awards	2016	Album of the Year – 3rd Quarter	Reality	Nominated	
Gaon Chart Music Awards	2017	Hot Performance Artist	Infinite	Won	
Golden Disc Awards	2012	Disc Bonsang Award	Over the Top	Won	
Golden Disc Awards	2012	Most Popular Artist Award	Infinite	Nominated	
Golden Disc Awards	2012	MSN Most Popular Artist Award	Infinite	Nominated	
Golden Disc Awards	2012	Hallyu Icon Award	Infinite	Won	
Golden Disc Awards	2013	Disc Bonsang Award	Infinitize	Won	
Golden Disc Awards	2013	Best Group Performance	Infinite	Won	
Golden Disc Awards	2014	Disc Bonsang Award	New Challenge	Won	
Golden Disc Awards	2014	Popularity Award	Infinite	Nominated	
Golden Disc Awards	2015	Disc Bonsang Award	Season 2	Won	
Golden Disc Awards	2016	Disc Bonsang Award	Reality	Nominated	
Golden Disc Awards	2017	Disc Bonsang Award	Infinite Only	Won	
Golden Disc Awards	2019	Popularity Award	Infinite	Nominated	
Golden Disc Awards	2019	NetEase Most Popular K-pop Star	Infinite	Nominated	
iQiyi All Star Carnival	2015	Best Asia Performing Group	Infinite	Won	
iQiyi All Star Carnival	2015	Best Music Award of the Year	Infinite	Won	
Korea Cable TV Awards	2016	Best Singer	Infinite	Won	
Korean Culture Entertainment Awards	2010	New Generation Popular Music Teen Singer Award	Infinite	Won	
Korean Music Awards	2012	Best Dance & Electronic Song	"Be Mine"	Nominated	
Korean Music Awards	2012	Group Musician of the Year by Netizens	Infinite	Won	
Korean Music Awards	2015	Best Dance & Electronic Album	Season 2	Nominated	
Korean Music Awards	2015	Group Musician of the Year by Netizens	Infinite	Won	
Melon Music Awards	2011	Top 10 Artist	Infinite	Nominated	
Melon Music Awards	2012	Top 10 Artist	Infinite	Won	
Melon Music Awards	2012	Artist of the Year	Infinite	Nominated	
Mnet 20's Choice Awards	2013	Best Global Touring Artist	Infinite	Won	
Mnet 20's Choice Awards	2013	20's Mwave Global Star	Infinite	Nominated	
Mnet Asian Music Awards	2010	Best New Male Artist Award	Infinite	Nominated	
Mnet Asian Music Awards	2011	Song of the Year	"Be Mine"	Nominated	
Mnet Asian Music Awards	2011	Best Dance Performance by a Male Group	"Be Mine"	Nominated	
Mnet Asian Music Awards	2012	Song of the Year	"The Chaser"	Nominated	
Mnet Asian Music Awards	2012	Best Music Video	"The Chaser"	Nominated	
Mnet Asian Music Awards	2012	Best Dance Performance by a Male Group	"The Chaser"	Nominated	
Mnet Asian Music Awards	2013	Best Male Group	Infinite	Won	
Mnet Asian Music Awards	2013	Best Dance Performance – Male Group	"Man In Love"	Nominated	
Mnet Asian Music Awards	2013	Sony MDR World Wide Performer	Infinite	Won	
Mnet Asian Music Awards	2014	Best Dance Performance – Male Group	"Last Romeo"	Won	
Mnet Asian Music Awards	2014	K-pop Fan's Choice - Male	Infinite	Won	
Mnet Asian Music Awards	2014	BC – UnionPay Album of the Year	Season 2	Nominated	
Mnet Asian Music Awards	2014	Song of the Year	"Last Romeo"	Nominated	
Mnet Asian Music Awards	2015	Best Dance Performance - Male Group	Infinite	Nominated	
Mnet Asian Music Awards	2015	Best Collaboration & Unit	Infinite H	Nominated	
Mnet Asian Music Awards	2015	Best Music Video	"Bad"	Nominated	
Mnet Asian Music Awards	2015	UnionPay Song of the Year	"Bad"	Nominated	
Mnet Asian Music Awards	2016	Best Male Group	Infinite	Nominated	
Mnet Asian Music Awards	2016	HotelsCombined Artist of the Year	Infinite	Nominated	
The Night of Stars-Korea Top Star Awards	2016	Top Singer Award	Infinite	Won	
OBS Idol Stars Awards	2011	Idol Growth No.1	Infinite	Won	
Republic of Korea Entertainment Art Awards	2015	Best Male Group	Infinite	Won	
Republic of Korea National Assembly Awards	2013	Popular Music of the Year	Infinite	Won	
SBS Gayo Daejeon	2014	Best Performance Chosen by Viewers	Infinite	Won	
SBS Gayo Daejeon	2014	Top 10 Award	Infinite	Won	
SBS MTV Best of the Best Awards	2012	Best Dance Music Video	"The Chaser"	Won	
SBS MTV Best of the Best Awards	2013	Best Unit	Infinite H	Won	
SBS MTV Best of the Best Awards	2013	Best Male Group	Infinite	Nominated	
SBS MTV Best of the Best Awards	2014	Best Male Group	Infinite	Nominated	
Seoul Foreign Correspondents' Club (SFCC) PR Awards	2011	Performance Group	Infinite	Won	
Seoul Music Awards	2010	Popularity Award	Infinite	Nominated	
Seoul Music Awards	2011	Bonsang Award	Infinite	Nominated	
Seoul Music Awards	2011	Popularity Award	Infinite	Nominated	
Seoul Music Awards	2014	Bonsang Award	Infinite	Won	
Seoul Music Awards	2014	Popularity Award	Infinite	Nominated	
Seoul Music Awards	2015	Bonsang Award	Infinite	Won	
Seoul Music Awards	2015	Special Hallyu Award	Infinite	Won	
V Live Awards	2017	Global Artist Top 10	Infinite	Won	

== Listicles ==
Name of publisher, year listed, name of listicle, and placement
Publisher	Year	Listicle	Placement	Ref.
The Dong-a Ilbo	2016	Best male artists according to experts	7th	
Forbes	2013	Korea Power Celebrity	20th	
Forbes	2014	Korea Power Celebrity	18th	
