= List of awards and nominations received by 2AM =

This is a list of awards and nominations received by South Korean boy band 2AM.

== Awards and nominations ==
=== Golden Disc Awards ===
| Year | Category | Recipient | Result |
|---|---|---|---|
| 2010 | Digital Daesang | "Can't Let You Go Even If I Die" | Won |
| 2010 | Digital Bonsang | "Can't Let You Go Even If I Die" | Won |
| 2012 | Digital Music Award | "I Wonder If You Hurt Like Me" | Nominated |
| 2012 | Popularity award | "F.Scott Fitzgerald's Way Of Love" | Nominated |

=== Seoul Music Awards ===
| Year | Category | Recipient | Result |
|---|---|---|---|
| 2011 | Bonsang | "Can’t Let You Go Even If I Die" | Won |
| 2011 | R&B Ballad Award | "Can’t Let You Go Even If I Die" | Won |
| 2013 | Bonsang | "I Wonder If You Hurt Like Me" | Nominated |

=== Mnet Asian Music Awards ===
| Year | Category | Recipient | Result |
|---|---|---|---|
| 2008 | Best New Male Artist | "This Song" | Nominated |
| 2010 | Song of the Year | "Can't Let You Go Even If I Die" | Nominated |
| 2010 | Album of the Year | "Can't Let You Go Even If I Die" | Nominated |
| 2010 | Artist of the Year | "Can't Let You Go Even If I Die" | Nominated |
| 2010 | Best Male Group | "Can't Let You Go Even If I Die" | Nominated |
| 2010 | Best Vocal Performance – Group | "Can't Let You Go Even If I Die" | Won |
| 2011 | Song of the Year | "You Wouldn't Answer My Calls" | Nominated |
| 2011 | Best Vocal Performance – Group | "You Wouldn't Answer My Calls" | Nominated |
| 2012 | Song of the Year | "I Wonder If You Hurt Like Me" | Nominated |
| 2012 | Best Vocal Performance – Group | "I Wonder If You Hurt Like Me" | Nominated |
| 2013 | Best Vocal Performance - Male | "One Spring Day" | Nominated |

=== Melon Music Awards ===
| Year | Category | Recipient | Result |
|---|---|---|---|
| 2010 | "'Song of the Year"' | "Can't Let You Go Even If I Die" | Won |
| 2010 | Album of the Year | "Can't Let You Go Even If I Die" | Nominated |
| 2010 | Top 10 Artists of the Year | "Can't Let You Go Even If I Die" | Won |
| 2010 | Hot Trend Song Award | "You Wouldn't Answer My Calls" | Nominated |
| 2012 | R&B/Ballad | "I Wonder If You Hurt Like Me" | Nominated |

=== KCEA Awards ===
| Year | Category | Recipient | Result |
|---|---|---|---|
| 2012 | Best Male Vocalist | "I Wonder If You Hurt Like Me" | Nominated |

=== Other awards ===
| Year | Award |
|---|---|
| 2008 | Cyworld Digital Music Awards: Rookie of the Month (July); Asia Song Festival: Rookie Award; Selected by Ministry of Culture, Sports and Tourism: Rookie of the Month (September) |
| 2010 | Cyworld Digital Music Awards: Song of the Month (February) ("Can't Let You Go Even If I Die"); Gaon Chart Grand Opening Awards: Ringtone Awards ("Can't Let You Go Even If I Die"; 2010 Korean National Assembly Daesang Awards: Popular Music(101220); MBC Entertainment Awards: Special Singer (2AM)(101229); 2010 MNET 20's Choice (20 Most Fluential Stars)(100826); 2010 Dosirak Best Music - Best K-pop Song “Can’t Let You Go Even If I Die”; 2010 Dosirak Best Music - Song of the Year “Can’t Let You Go Even If I Die”; 2010 Nickelodeon Korea Kids' Choice Awards: Favorite Male Singer |
| 2011 | 2010 Cyworld Digital Music Awards: Song of the Year ("Can't Let You Go Even If I Die"); 5th Mnet 20's Choice Awards : Pocari Sweat Hot Balance Star |

== Rankings ==
Name of publisher, year listed, name of listicle, and placement
| Publisher | Year | List | Placement | Ref. |
|---|---|---|---|---|
| Forbes | 2011 | Korea Power Celebrity | 8th | |
