= MAMA Award for Best Asian Artist =

Music award category

- Awarded for: Best artist from each country and region (East & Southeast Asia)
- Country: South Korea
- Presented by: CJ E&M Pictures (Mnet)
- First award: 2004
- Website: Official website

The MAMA Award for Best Asian Artist is an award presented by Mnet and CJ E&M Pictures at the annual South Korean-based MAMA Awards. It was first awarded at the 2004 Mnet KM Music Video Festival ceremony with genre specific categories. Artists from mainly East and Southeast Asia have received the awards, and it is given in honor of artist(s) with the best performance in the music industry in their respective countries or region.

== Best Asian Artist Award ==
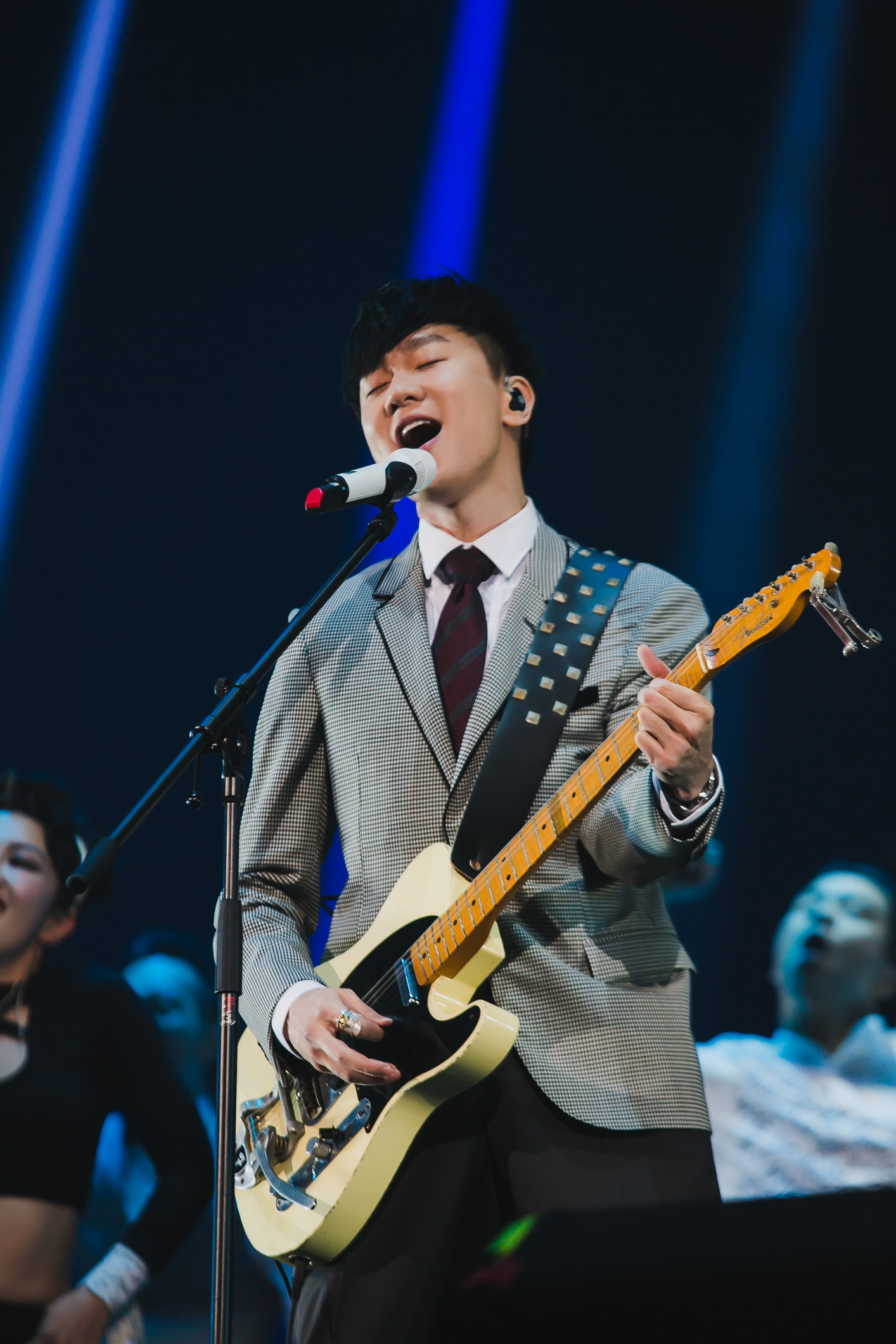
Singaporean singer JJ Lin has received the Best Asian Artist award 3 times

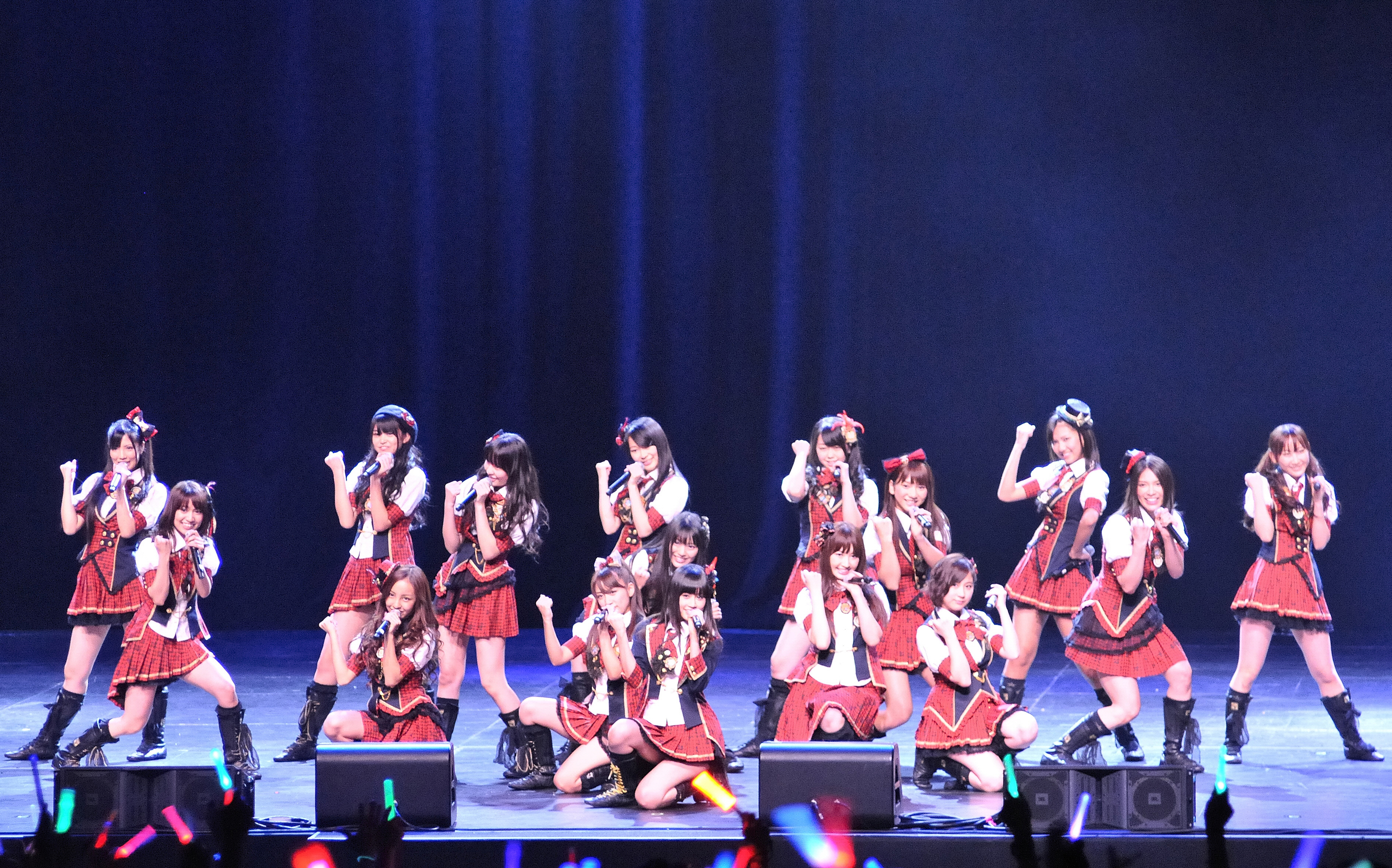
Japanese idol group AKB48 has received the Best Asian Artist award 3 times

Year	Winner	Nationality
2010	Jason Zhang	China
2011	Jane Zhang	China
2012	Leehom Wang (Note: Wang received the overall Best Asian Artist Award.)	Taiwan
2012	My Tam	Vietnam
2012	AKB48	Japan
2012	Taufik Batisah	Singapore
2012	Li Yuchun	China
2012	Sarah Geronimo	Philippines
2012	Agnes Monica	Indonesia
2013	Derrick Hoh	Singapore
2013	Kyary Pamyu Pamyu	Japan
2013	Aaron Kwok	Hong Kong
2013	Thu Minh	Vietnam
2013	ToR+ Saksit	Thailand
2013	SM*SH	Indonesia
2014 (Note: Titled "Artist of the Year" by Region.)	Hồ Quỳnh Hương	Vietnam
2014	Eason Chan	Hong Kong
2014	Thaitanium	Thailand
2014	JJ Lin	Singapore
2014	Leo Ieiri	Japan
2014	Raisa	Indonesia
2015	Jolin Tsai	Taiwan
2015	Potato	Thailand
2015	RAN	Indonesia
2015	Stefanie Sun	Singapore
2015	AKB48	Japan
2015	Dong Nhi	Vietnam
2016	Getsunova	Thailand
2016	Noo Phuoc Thinh	Vietnam
2016	Isyana Sarasvati	Indonesia
2016	JJ Lin	Singapore
2016	Sekai no Owari	Japan
2016	Hua Chenyu	China
2017	Agnez Mo	Indonesia
2017	Lula	Thailand
2017	Aisyah Aziz	Singapore
2017	Tóc Tiên	Vietnam
2017	Karen Mok (Note: Mok received the Best Asian Artist Mandarin Award.)	Hong Kong
2017	AKB48	Japan
2018	Afgan	Indonesia
2018	Da Pump	Japan
2018	JJ Lin	Singapore
2018	Huong Tram	Vietnam
2018	Peck Palitchoke	Thailand
2019	Andmesh Kamaleng	Indonesia
2019	Aimyon	Japan
2019	Li Ronghao	China
2019	Hoàng Thùy Linh	Vietnam
2019	Nont Tanont	Thailand
2020	Rizky Febian	Indonesia
2020	Official Hige Dandism	Japan
2020	G.E.M.	Hong Kong
2020	Binz	Vietnam
2020	Ink Waruntorn	Thailand
2021	Anneth Delliecia	Indonesia
2021	JO1	Japan
2021	Accusefive	Taiwan
2021	Quân A.P	Vietnam
2021	Tilly Birds	Thailand

== Best New Asian Artist ==
Year	Winner	Nationality
2008	Khalil Fong	Hong Kong
2010	My Tam	Vietnam
2011	Vision Wei	China
2011	Aziatix	United States
2012	Exo (K+M)	South Korea
2012	Natthew	Thailand
2012	TimeZ	China
2017	NCT 127	South Korea
2018	Marion Jola	Indonesia
2018	Hiragana Keyakizaka46	Japan
2018	Dean Ting	China
2018	Orange	Vietnam
2018	The Toys	Thailand
2018	Iz*One	South Korea
2019	Stephanie Poetri	Indonesia
2019	King Gnu	Japan
2019	WayV	China
2019	K-ICM & Jack	Vietnam
2019	Wanyai	Thailand
2019	OSN	Taiwan
2020	Tiara Andini	Indonesia
2020	Fujii Kaze, JO1	Japan
2020	Amee	Vietnam
2020	Milli	Thailand
2020	Chih Siou	Taiwan
2021	Lyodra	Indonesia
2021	Ado	Japan
2021	Anson Lo	Hong Kong
2021	Sprite X Guygeegee	Thailand
2021	Hoàng Duyên	Vietnam

== Genre-specific ==
Year	Winner	Nationality	Genre
2004	F4	Taiwan	Pop
2004	Gackt	Japan	Rock
2004	M-Flo	Japan	Hip Hop
2006	W-inds	Japan	Rock
2010	Perfume	Japan	Pop
2010	Chemistry	Japan	R&B

== Others ==
Year	Category	Winner	Nationality
2009	Asia Recommended Award (Japan)	AKB48	Japan
2009	Asia Recommended Award (China)	Lollipop	Taiwan
2009	Best Asia Star Award	TVXQ	South Korea
2010	The Shilla Duty Free Asian Wave Award	2PM – "I'll Be Back"	South Korea
2011	Hottest Asian Artist	Koda Kumi	Japan
2015	Next Generation Asian Artist	Monsta X	South Korea
2017	Vietnamese Breakout Artist with Close-Up	Sơn Tùng M-TP	Vietnam
2018	Favorite Dance Artist (Japan)	Bullet Train	Japan

== Notes ==
^{^[I]} Each year is linked to the article about the Mnet Asian Music Awards held that year.
