= 2010 Mnet Asian Music Awards =

Music award ceremony in South Korea

- Date: November 28, 2010
- Venue: The Venetian Macao, Macau, China
- Most awards: 2NE1 (4)
- Most nominations: 2NE1 (6)
- Website: Mnet Asian Music Awards

Television/radio coverage
- Runtime: Approximately 190 minutes

The 2010 Mnet Asian Music Awards took place on November 28, 2010, at The Venetian Macao in Macau, China. It is the first ceremony to take place outside of South Korea with approximately 10,000 people attending the show. 2NE1 won the most awards, winning four out of their six nominations, including Artist of the Year and Album of the Year.

== Background ==
The ceremony marked the twelfth edition of the annual music awards. The ceremony's slogan was "One Asia". It was broadcast live in China, Japan, Hong Kong and Southeast Asia through various channels, as well as in the United States and Canada.

Artists Taeyang, DJ Doc, Gummy, Rain, Hot Potato, Far East Movement, Perfume, I Me, and Chemistry all won awards during the televised broadcast. Recorded videos of international artists were shown including Lam Tun, Ho Gu Hua, Hong Ying, Pam Tan, Keri Hilson, and will.i.am. CNBLUE, 2AM, Jo Kwon, Gain also won awards but were not shown on broadcast due to their absence.

== Performers ==
The following individuals and groups, listed in order of appearance, performed musical numbers at the ceremony.

Name(s)	Performed	Notes	Ref.
Tiger JK, Styliztik Jones, Zeebra, Roscoe Umali, DJ Jhig + Tasha	"Jet Pack", "Monster"		
Miss A	"Bad Girl Good Girl", "Breathe"	Best New Female Artist awardee	
Superstar K2's John Park, Jang Jae-in and Kang Seung-Yoon	"Without You", "Sick Enough to Die", "Scatter", "You and I", "Then Then Then"	Best Digital Single nominee songs	
Jason Zhang	"It's Love"		
2PM	"Again & Again", "I Hate You", "Without U", "Tired of Waiting", "Only You", "Heartbeat", "I'll Be Back"		
I Me, Perfume	"Aiayiya", "Nee", "Chocolate Disco"		
DJ DOC	"Bounce With Me", "Shake It"	Performed upon receiving the Best Rap Performance award	
Gummy ft. Jason Zhang	"Because of You", "The Moon Represents My Heart"		
2NE1	"Clap Your Hands", "Try to Follow Me", "Can't Nobody"		
Huh Gak	"This Is the Moment"		
Taeyang, T.O.P, G-Dragon	"Break Down", "I Need a Girl", "Turn It Up", "Knock Out", "Hallelujah"		
Chemistry	"A Better Tomorrow", "Pieces Of Dream"		
Far East Movement	"Girls On The Dance Floor", "Like a G6"	Best International Artist awardee	
Wonder Girls	"So Hot", "2 Different Tears", "Nobody"		

== Presenters ==
- 2NE1 – presented Best New Female Artist
- Miss Korea's Jung So-ra, Chang Hyung-jin, Ha Yun-jong – presented Best Dance Performance by a Male Group
- Eugene – presented Best New Asian Artist Award
- Woo Man-so – presented Best Digital Single
- John Park, Jang Jae-in, Kang Seung-Yoon – introduced presenter Zhang Jie
- Son Ho (손호영) and Kim Jung-min (김정민) – presented Asian Pop Artist
- Kim Jongju and Choo Hyunhee – presented Best Female Group
- Miss A – introduced presenters I Me and Perfume
- Cho Yeo-jeong – presented Best Male Solo Artist
- Yoon Jong-shin and Seo Hyo-rim – presented Best Rap Performance
- Song Joong-ki – presented Best Solo Vocal Performance and Best Asian Artist
- Oh Ji-ho and So Yoo-jin – presented Best Male Group and Best Solo Dance Performance
- UV – presented Best Band Performance
- Kim Dong-wook – presented Best Dance Performance by a Female Group
- Lam Tun, Ho Gu Hua, Hong Ying, Pam Tan, Keri Hilson, will.i.am – VTR Greetings
- Ok Taecyeon, Nichkhun, Song Jong-min – presented Best International Artist
- Yoon Jong-shin – introduced Huh Gak
- Kim Jung-eun – speech
- Kim Kang-woo – presented Best R&B Asian Artist
- Hanni and Shilla Duty Free CEO – presented The Shilla Duty Free Asian Wave Award
- Jun Jeong Myeong and Kim Hyun Jung – presented Best Music Video
- Joo Jin-mo – presented Artist of the Year
- Yoon Eun-hye – presented Album of the Year
- Hong Jongmin and Kim Jung-eun – presented Song of the Year

== Winners and nominees ==
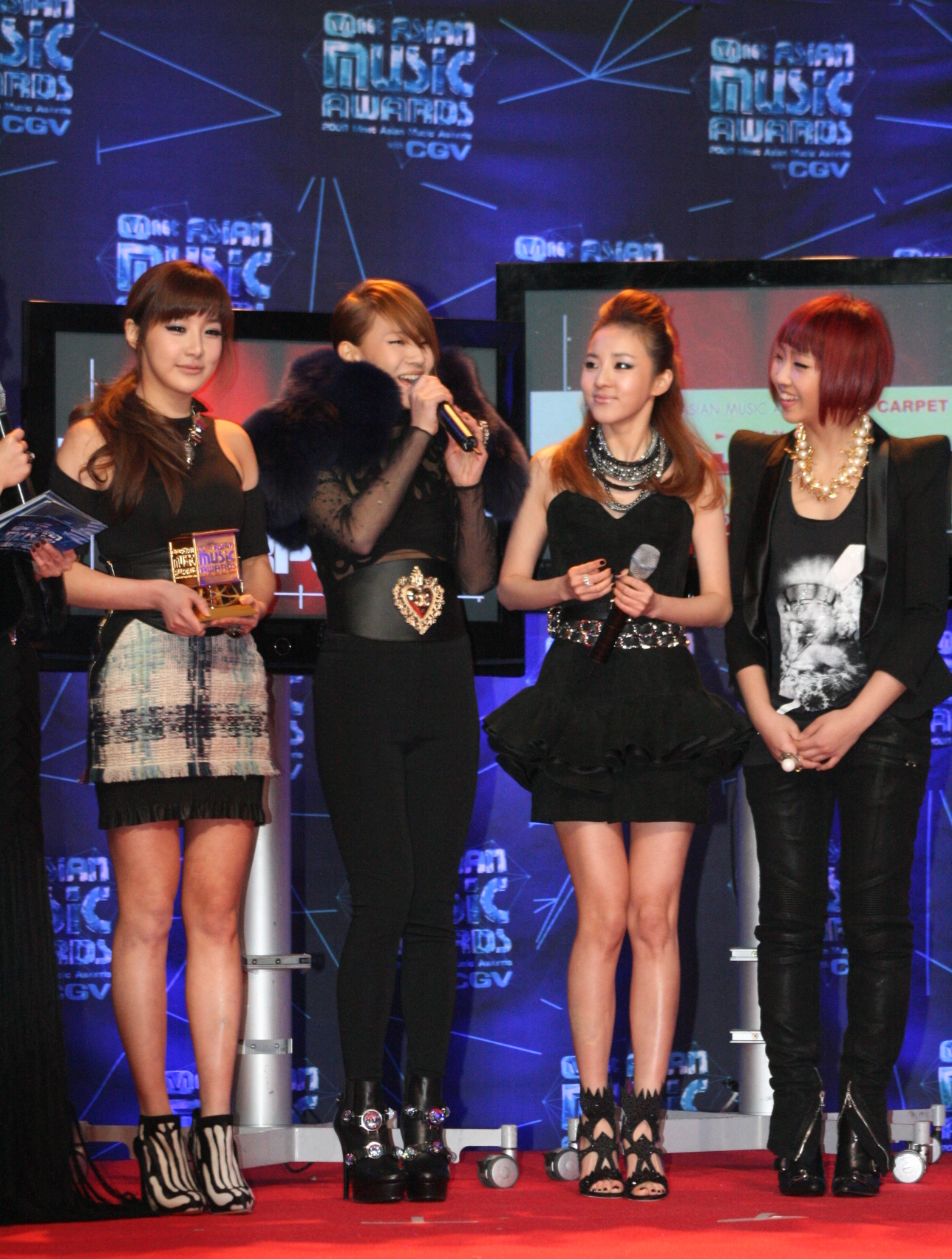
2NE1 won multiple awards including Artist of the Year and Album of the Year

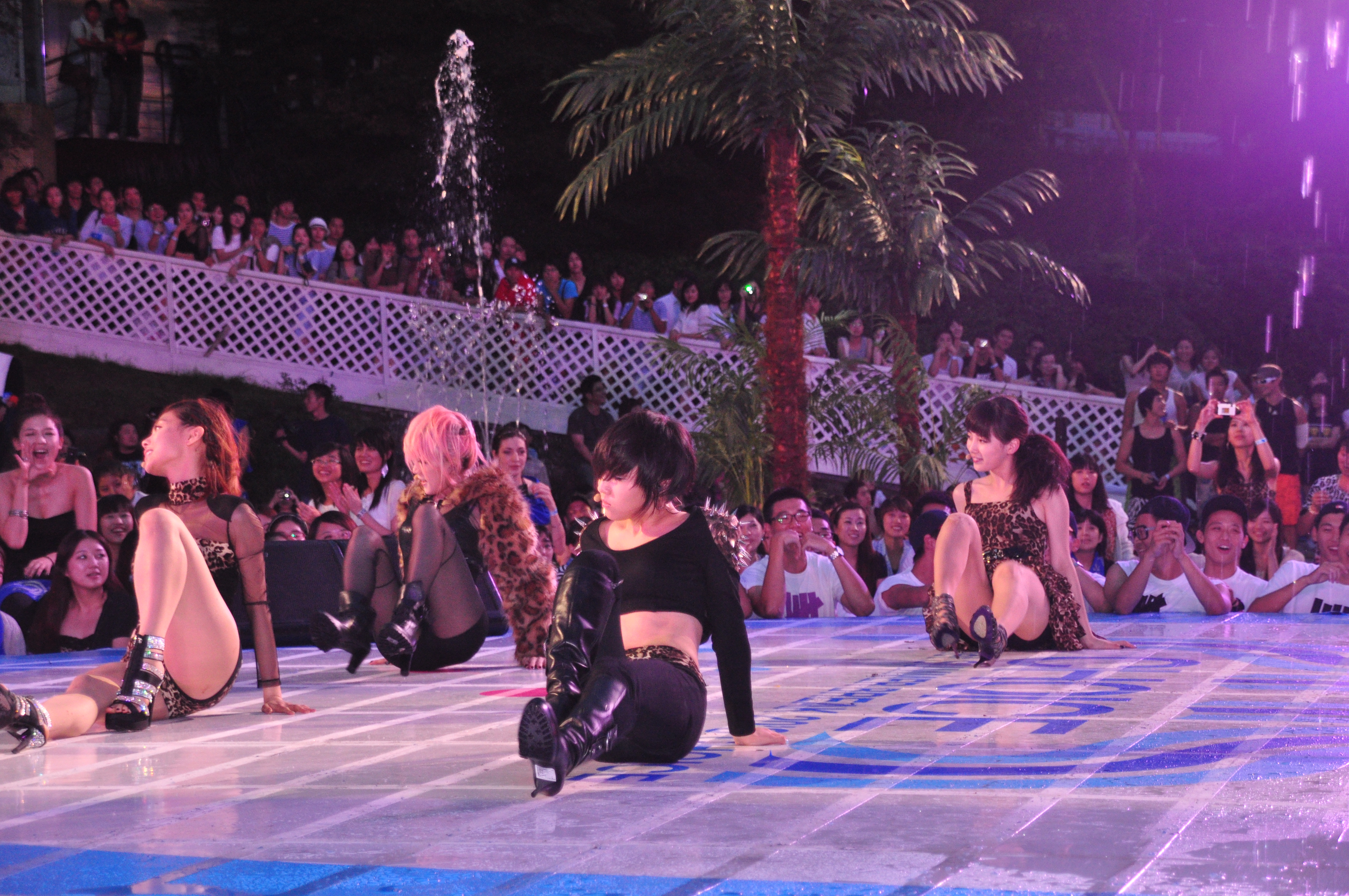
Miss A won multiple awards including Song of the Year

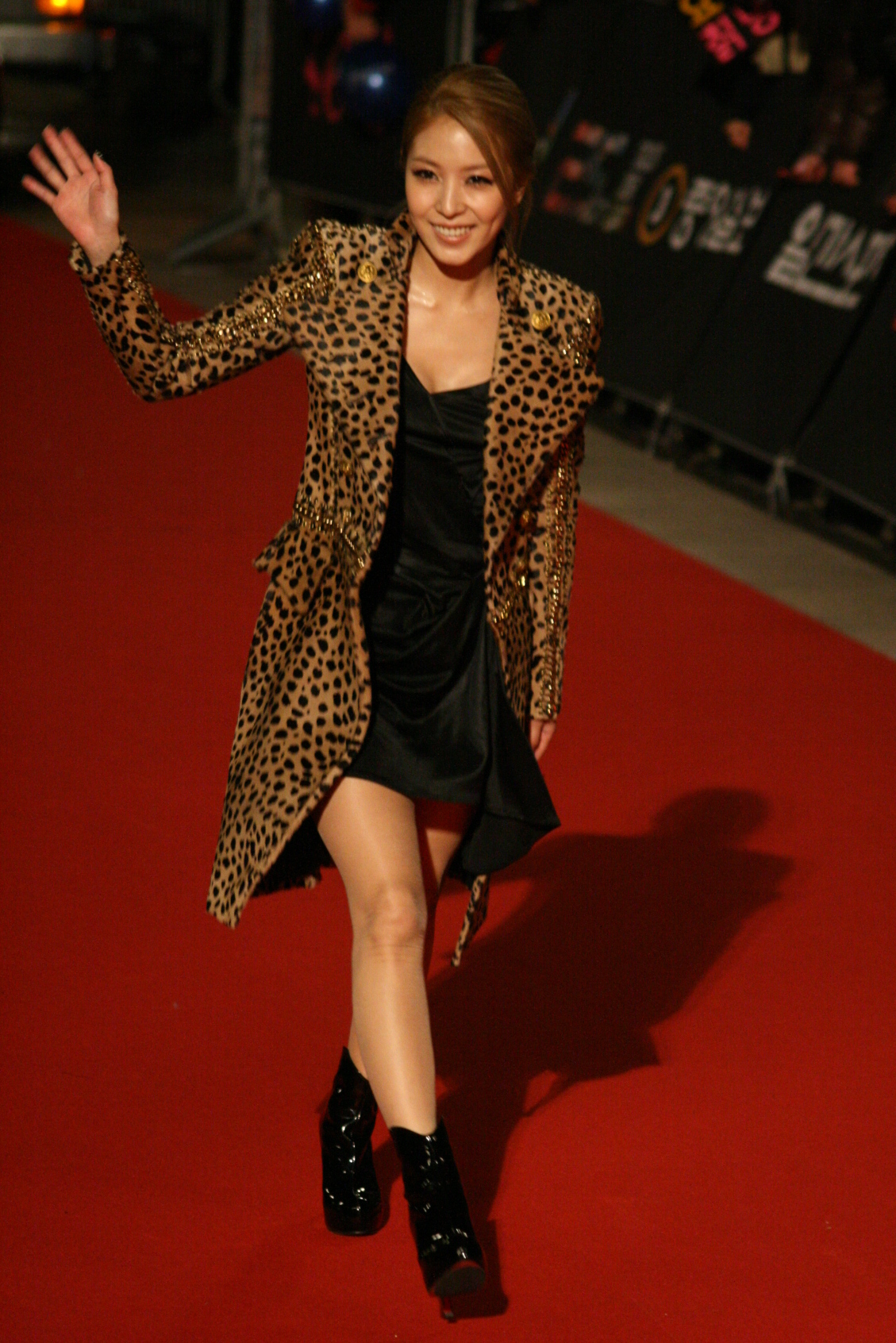
BoA won Best Female Solo Artist

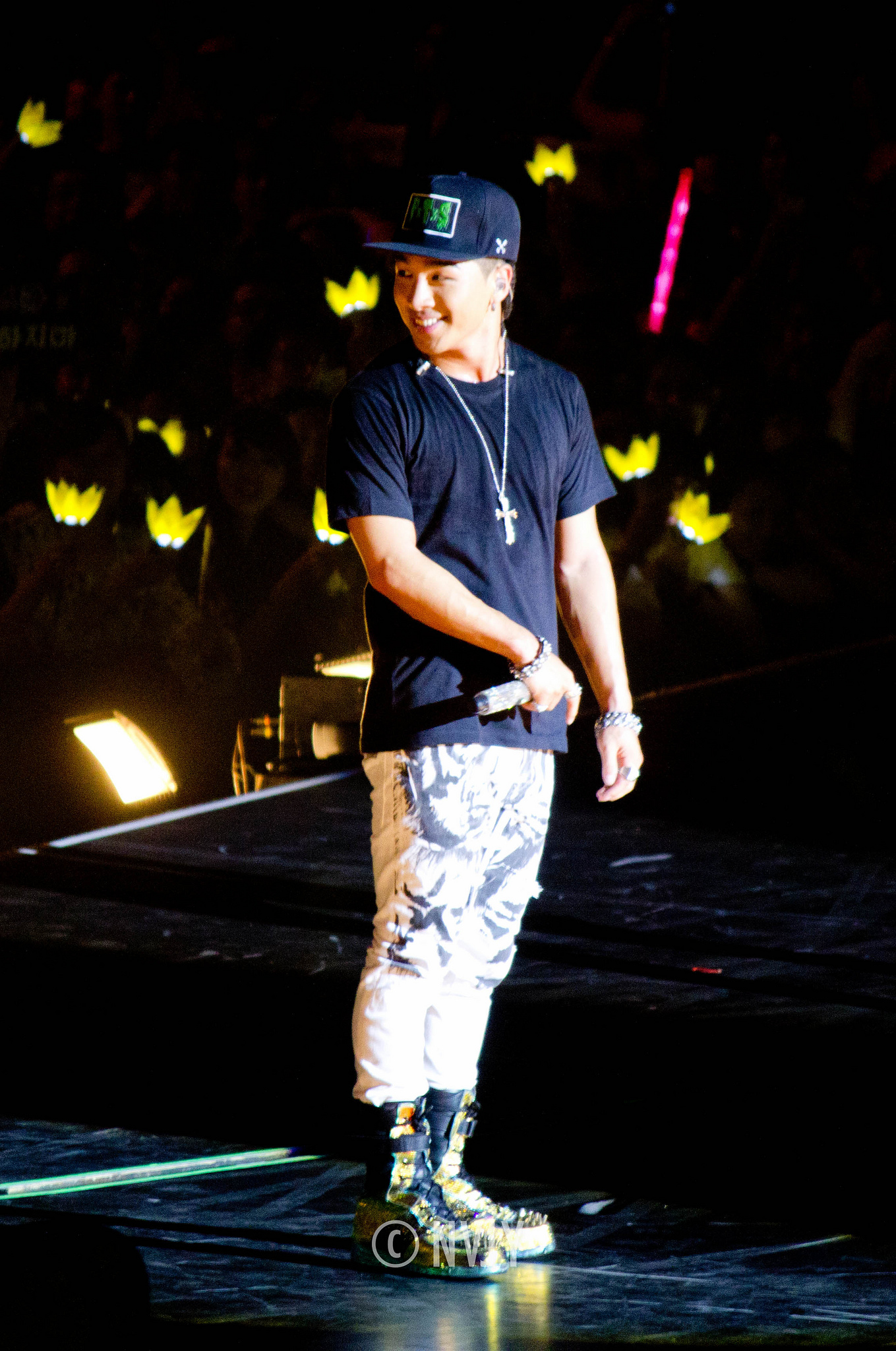
Taeyang won Best Male Solo Artist

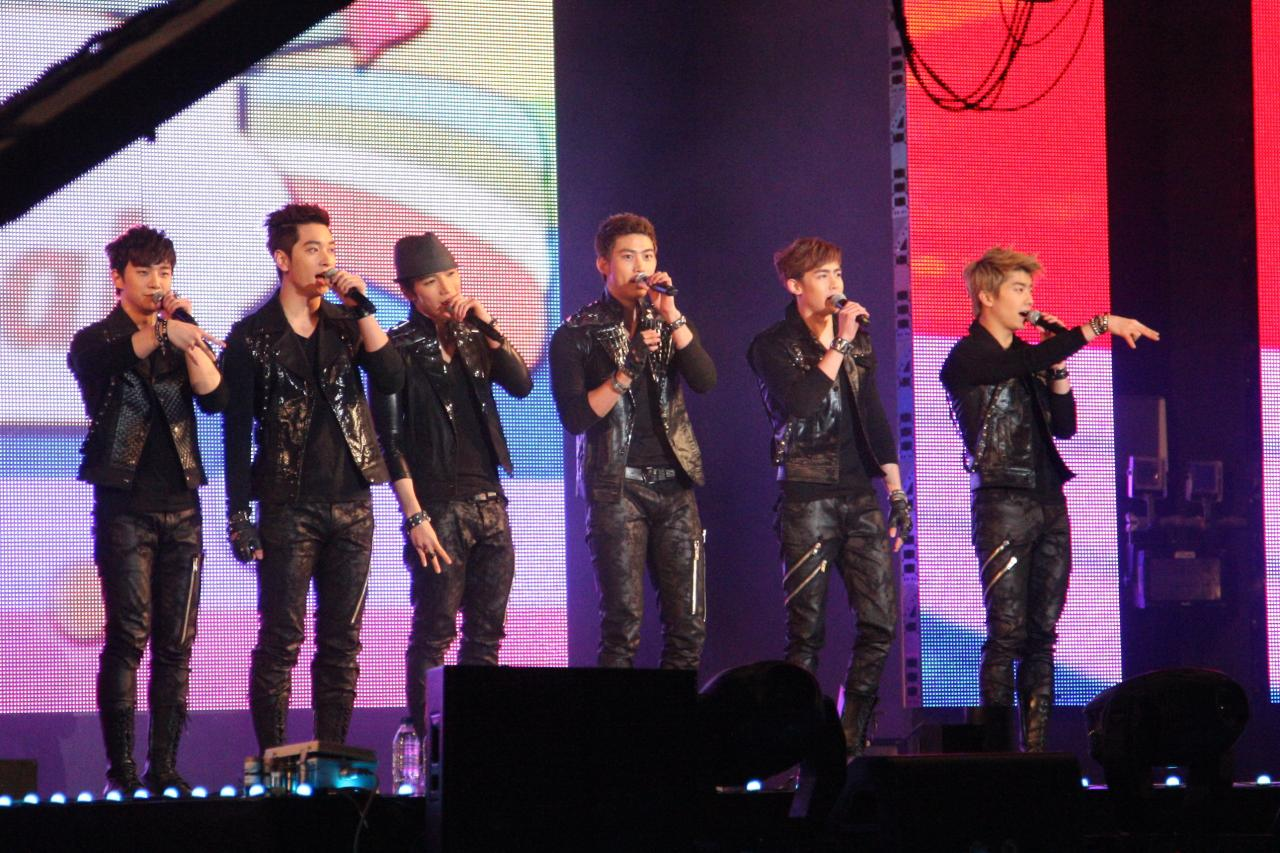
2PM won Best Male Group and Dance Performance Male Group

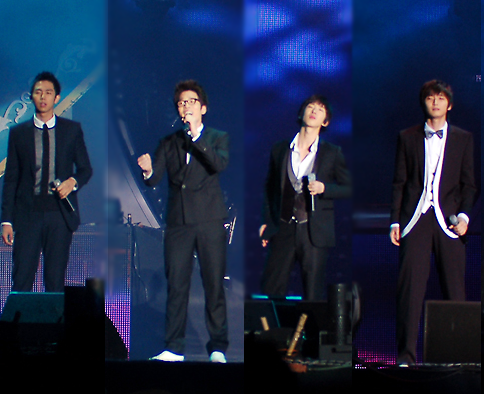
2AM won Best Group Vocal Performance Group

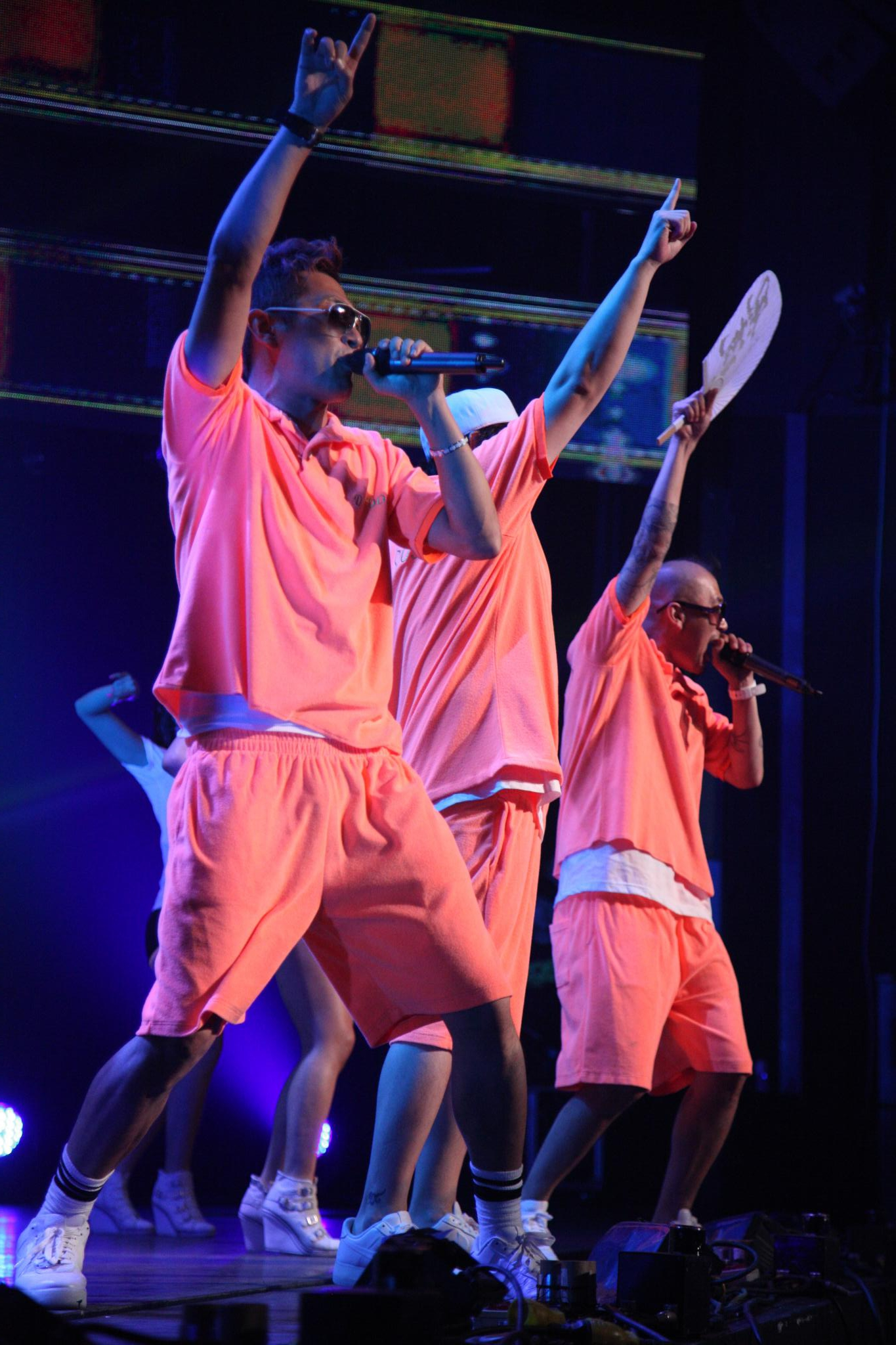
DJ DOC won Best Rap Performance

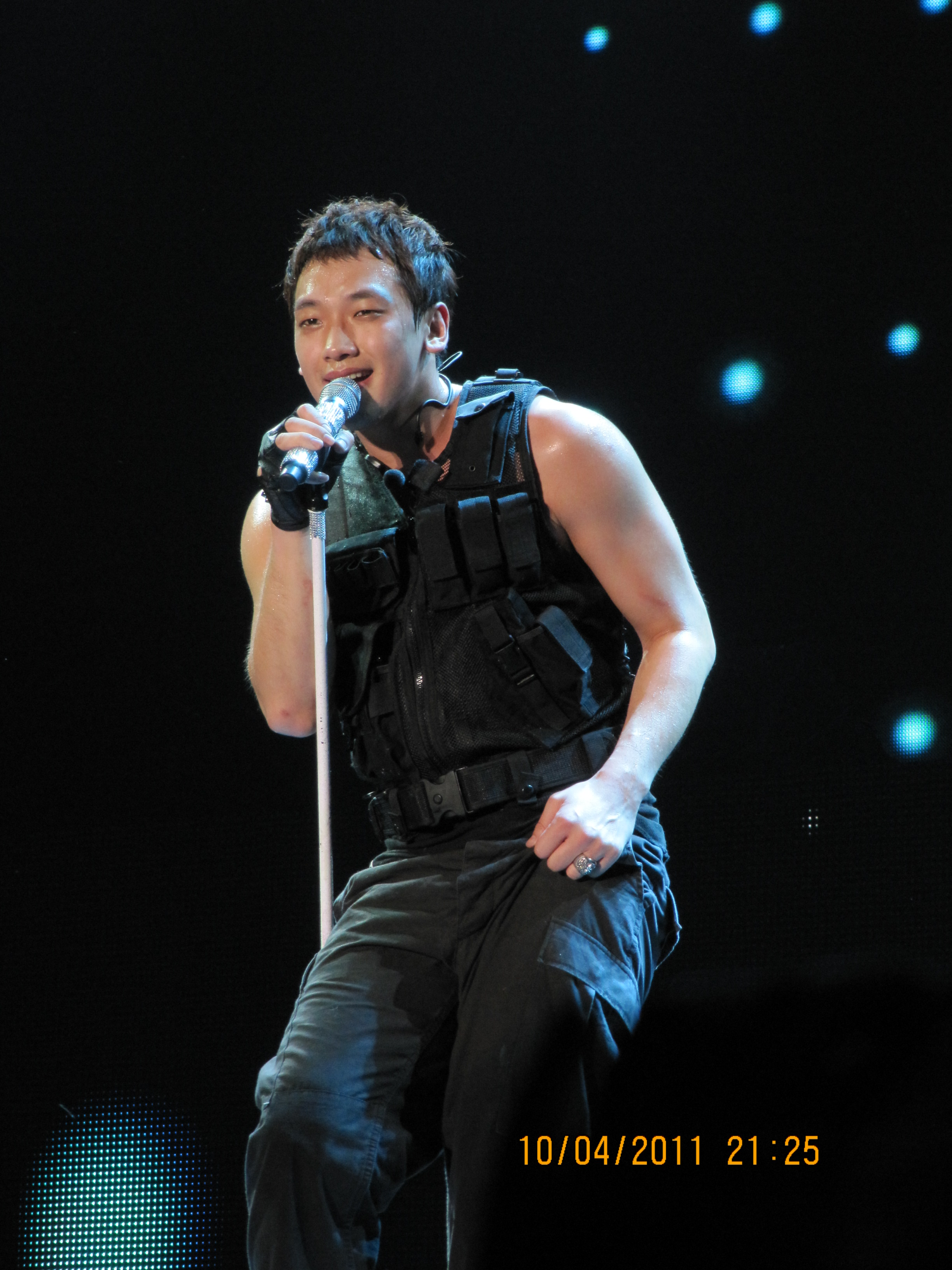
Rain won Best Dance Performance Solo

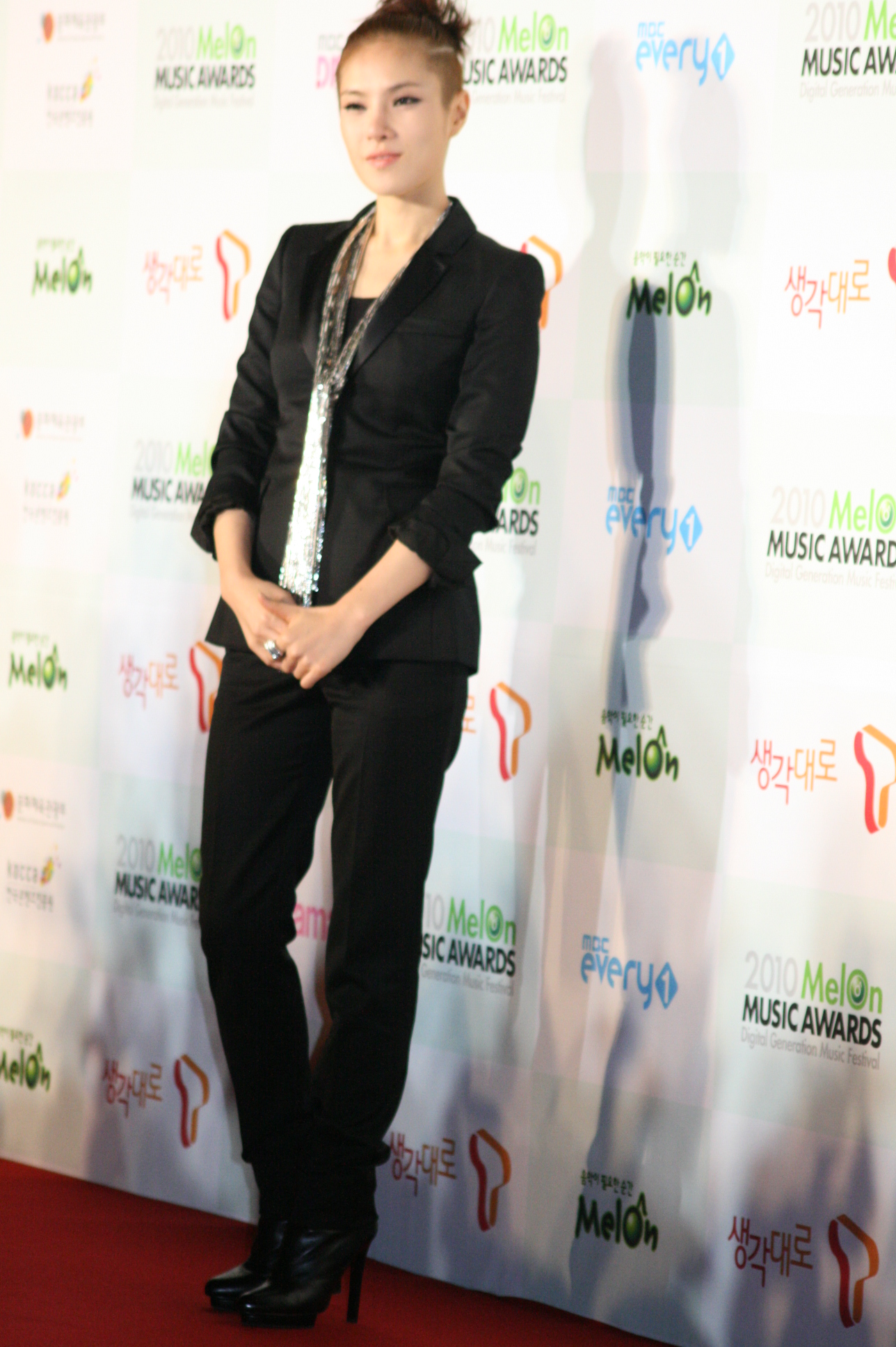
Gummy won Best Vocal Performance Solo

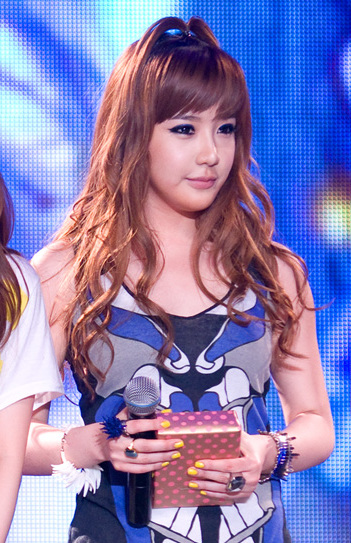
Park Bom won Best Digital Single

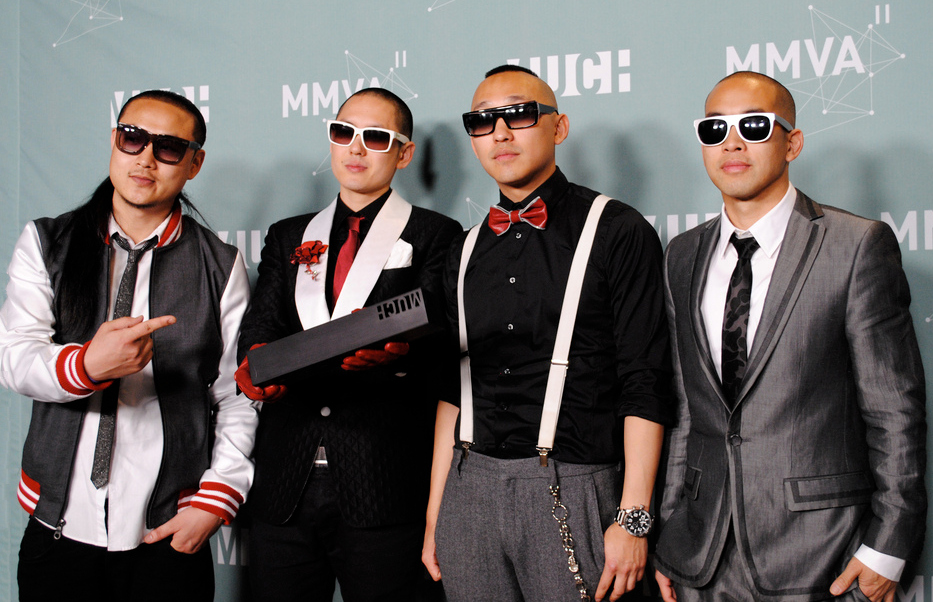
Far East Movement won Best International Artist

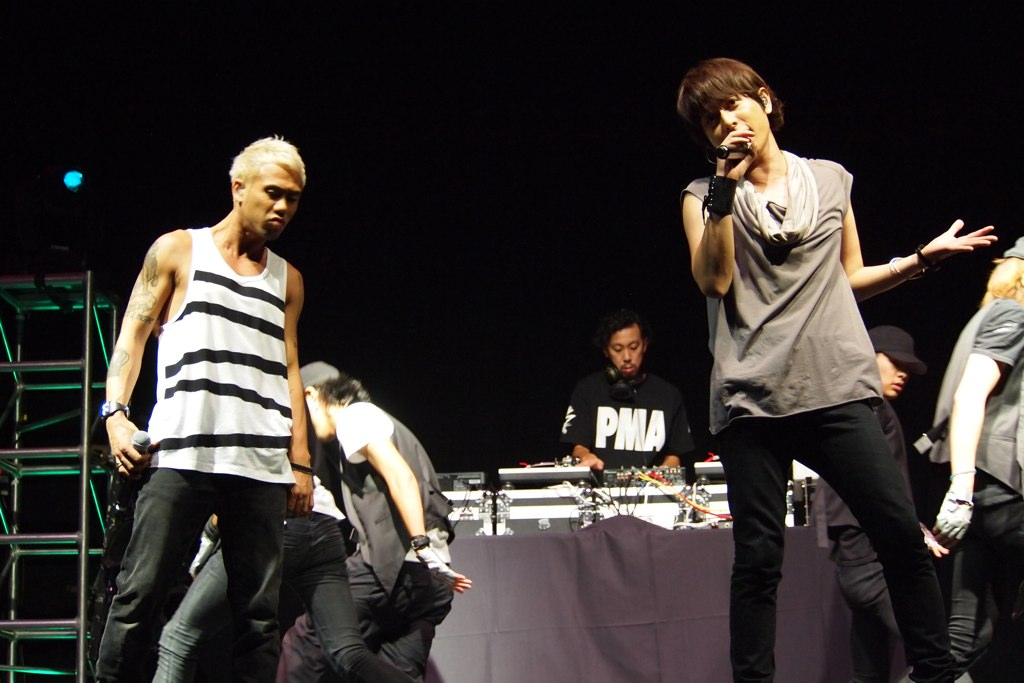
Chemistry won Best R&B Asian Artist

Winners are listed first and highlighted in boldface.

Song of the Year (Daesang)	Album of the Year (Daesang)
**Miss A – "Bad Girl Good Girl"**; 2AM – "Can't Let You Go Even If I Die"; 2NE1 – "Can't Nobody"; 2PM – "I'll Be Back"; DJ DOC – "I Am Who I Am"	**2NE1 – To Anyone**; 2AM – Can't Let You Go Even If I Die; BoA – Hurricane Venus; Super Junior – Bonamana; Taeyang – Solar
Artist of the Year (Daesang)	Best Music Video
**2NE1**; 2AM; 2PM; Miss A; Girls' Generation	**2NE1 – "Can't Nobody"**; Epik High – "Run"; UV – "Sorry I Can't Be Cool"; Gain – "Irreversible"; Taeyang – "I'll Be There"
Best New Female Artist	Best New Male Artist
**Miss A**; G.NA; Nine Muses; Rainbow; Sistar	**CNBLUE**; Infinite; Seo In-guk; Teen Top; ZE:A
Best Male Group	Best Female Group
**2PM**; 2AM; Beast; MBLAQ; Super Junior	**2NE1**; 4Minute; Girls' Generation; Kara; T-ara
Best Male Solo Artist	Best Female Solo Artist
**Taeyang**; PSY; Rain; Seven; Wheesung	**BoA**; Gummy; Lee Hyori; Seo In-Young; Son Dambi
Best Dance Performance (Male Group)	Best Dance Performance (Female Group)
**2PM – "I'll Be Back"**; Beast – "Shock"; MBLAQ – "Y"; Shinee – "Lucifer"; Super Junior – "Bonamana"	**Miss A – "Bad Girl Good Girl"**; 2NE1 – "Can't Nobody"; 4Minute – "Huh"; Secret – "Magic"; T-ara – "Bo Peep Bo Peep"
Best Dance Performance (Solo)	Best Collaboration
**Rain – "Love Song"**; Hyuna – "Change" (featuring Yong Jun-hyung); Lee Hyori – "Chitty Chitty Bang Bang" (featuring Ceejay); Narsha – "Bbi Ri Bba Bba"; Taeyang – "I'll Be There"	**Gain and Jo Kwon – "I Happen to Love You"**; Homme – "I Was Able to Eat Well"; IU and Lim Seul-ong – "Nagging"; IU and Sung Si-kyung – "It's You"; Jeong Yeob and Seo Young Eun – "Spiteful Words"
Best Rap Performance	Best Band Performance
**DJ DOC – "I'm Like This"**; Epik High – "Run"; Outsider – "Outsider"; Supreme Team – "Dang Dang Dang"; UV – "Sorry I'm Not Cool"	**Hot Potato – "Propose"**; Boohwal – "What Love Is"; CNBLUE – "Love"; F.T. Island – "Love Love Love"; TransFixion – "The Shouts of Reds"
Best Vocal Performance (Solo)	Best Vocal Performance (Group)
**Gummy – "As a Man"**; Jung-in – "I Hate You"; K.Will – "Miss, Miss and Miss"; Seo In-young – "Written as Love, Sung as Pain"; Wheesung – "I Thought of Marriage"	**2AM – "Can't Let You Go Even If I Die"**; 4Men – "I Can't"; 8Eight – "Farewell is Coming"; Davichi – "Stop the Time"; Vibe – "Please Come Back Again"
The Shilla Duty Free Asian Wave Award	Best Digital Single
**2PM – "I'll Be Back"**; 4Minute – "Huh"; CNBLUE – "Love"; Girls' Generation – "Oh!"; Kara – "Lupin"	**Park Bom – "You and I"**; Jeong Yeob – "Without You"; MC Mong – "Sick Enough to Die" (featuring Mellow); Monday Kiz – "Scatter"; Supreme Team – "Then Then Then" (featuring Youngjun)

Special awards

- Best New Asian Artist Award: **I Me – "Aiayiya"**
- Asian Pop Artist: **Perfume – "Chocolate Disco"**
- Best Asian Artist: **Jason Zhang – "It's Love"**
- Best R&B Asian Artist: **Chemistry – "Pieces Of Dream"**
- Best International Artist: **Far East Movement – "Like a G6"**
- Choreographer Award: **Kim Hwa-young**
- Producer Award: **Psy**
- Adult Music Award: **Tae Jin-ah**
- Stylist Award: **Yang Seung-ho**
- Performance Award: **Jisan Valley Rock Festival**

== Multiple awards ==
=== Artist(s) with multiple wins ===
The following artist(s) received two or more wins (excluding the special awards):

Awards	Artist(s)
4	2NE1
3	Miss A
2	2PM

=== Artist(s) with multiple nominations ===
The following artist(s) received more than two nominations:

Nominations	Artist(s)
6	2NE1
5	2AM
4	Miss A
4	2PM
4	Taeyang
3	Super Junior

== Criticism ==
SM Entertainment boycotted the 2010 Mnet Asian Music Awards, as they did in 2009, due to issues with fairness and employing a "no show, no award" policy where the winner must attend the ceremonies.

In addition, Mnet came under criticism due to the date and location of the awards. It was the first Mnet Asian Music Awards to take place outside of South Korea. They also aired on a Sunday, which means performers had to choose between SBS's The Music Trend show or the awards ceremony.

== Broadcast ==
- South Korea: Mnet
- Cambodia: MyTV
- China: SMG, Channel V Mainland China
- Hongkong: TVB J2, TVBM
- Japan: Mnet Japan, Music On! TV (replay)
- Singapore: Channel U
- Southeast Asia: tvN Asia, Star World, Channel V Asia
- Taiwan: Dong Feng
- Thailand: Bang Channel
- Vietnam: YAN TV
