= I Me =

Chinese girl group

i Me
- Origin: China
- Genres: Mandopop
- Years active: 2010–2013
- Labels: DOREMI MUSIC (2010–2012); EE-Media (2010–2012); True Fantasia (2010–2012)
- Past members: Mocika; Mikan; Niki; Sara; Haley

I Me (stylized i Me) is a multinational girl group from China whose members are Mocika (李媛希), Niki (易易紫), and Mikan (刘美含) from China; Haley (沈泫京) from South Korea; and Sara (那琳) from Thailand. I Me debuted on May 27, 2010. By the year 2012 they released their first Thai single "Help me!" and entered into Academy Fantasia season 7 and season 8. I Me later disbanded in 2013.

== Members ==
=== The "girl next door" – Mocika Lee ===
Li Yuan-Xi (李媛希), also known as Mocika, a girl born on February 10, 1990, in Sichuan, China, is a student from Sichuan University of Electronic Technology. During predebut, Mocika was a former contestant in the Chinese singing competition Super Girl in 2009. She is responsible for the midbass in i Me. She is the leader in both singing and dancing in this group.

=== The lovely princess – Mikan Liu ===
Liu Mei-Han (刘美含), also known as Mikan, was born on April 9, 1991, in Shenzhen, China. She studied in the Japanese Language Department of Beijing Foreign Studies University. During predebut, Mikan was a former contestant in the Chinese singing competition Super Girl in 2009. She is the visual of i ME.

=== The sexy bobbed girl---Niki Yi ===
Yi Yi-Zi (易易紫), also known as Niki, a girl born on November 8, 1987, in Sichuan, China. During predebut, Niki was a former contestant in the Chinese singing competition Super Girl in 2009. She is good at dancing and rap, and she is the only bobbed girl in the group.

=== The enthusiastic cat – Sara Hohler ===
Nalintara Hohler (นลินธารา โฮเลอร์), also known as Nalin or Sara, is a Thai-German member. She was born in Chiang Mai, Thailand and graduated from Thammasat University. During predebut, Sara was a former contestant in the Thai singing competition Academy Fantasia season 3.Before being selected into i Me, she was part of the Thai girl group G2G (Girlz to Go) along with contestants from AF2, AF3, and AF4. Now, she is the vice vocals of i Me.

=== The cool beauty---Haley Shim ===
Shim Hyun-Kyung (심현경), also known as Haley, is a South Korean girl, who was born on October 5, 1988, in Puchon, South Korea. She was an SM trainee for 10 years before being selected into i Me. Haley is responsible for the high-pitched parts in i Me.

== Awards ==
- 2010/08/21 7th Music King Awards (劲歌王·金曲金榜), i Me won the "Most Promising New Group" award.
- 2010/11/28 The 12th Mnet Asian Music Awards, i Me won the Best Asian New Artist award.
- 2010/12/19 3rd New Billboard Music Festival (音乐风云榜新人盛典), i Me won "The Year's Most Fashionable Artist" award.

== Discography ==
=== EPs ===
- (2010) Aiyiya (哎咿呀)

=== Singles ===
- (2010) "The Limits of Friendship (友情的界限)", from the original soundtrack of Meteor Shower 2
- (2012) "Honey Honey", from the original soundtrack of Half a Fairy Tale
- (2012) "Help Me!"

== Filmography ==
=== Movies ===
- Magic to Win (开心魔法)

=== Dramas ===
- Hello Summer (夏日甜心)
- I, Another (世界上另一个我)
- Half a Fairy Tale (童话二分之一)
