= MAMA Award for Artist of the Year =

Korean music award

- Awarded for: Best individual/group of the year
- Country: South Korea
- Presented by: CJ E&M (Mnet)
- First award: 2006
- Currently held by: G-Dragon (2025)
- Website: Mnet Asian Music Awards

The MAMA Award for Artist of the Year (올해의 가수상) is a daesang (or grand prize) award presented by CJ E&M (Mnet) at the annual MAMA Awards. It was first awarded at the event's 8th ceremony held in 2006; the five-member boyband group TVXQ won the award, and it is given in honor for artists with artistic achievement, technical proficiency and overall excellence in the music industry.

== Winners and nominees ==
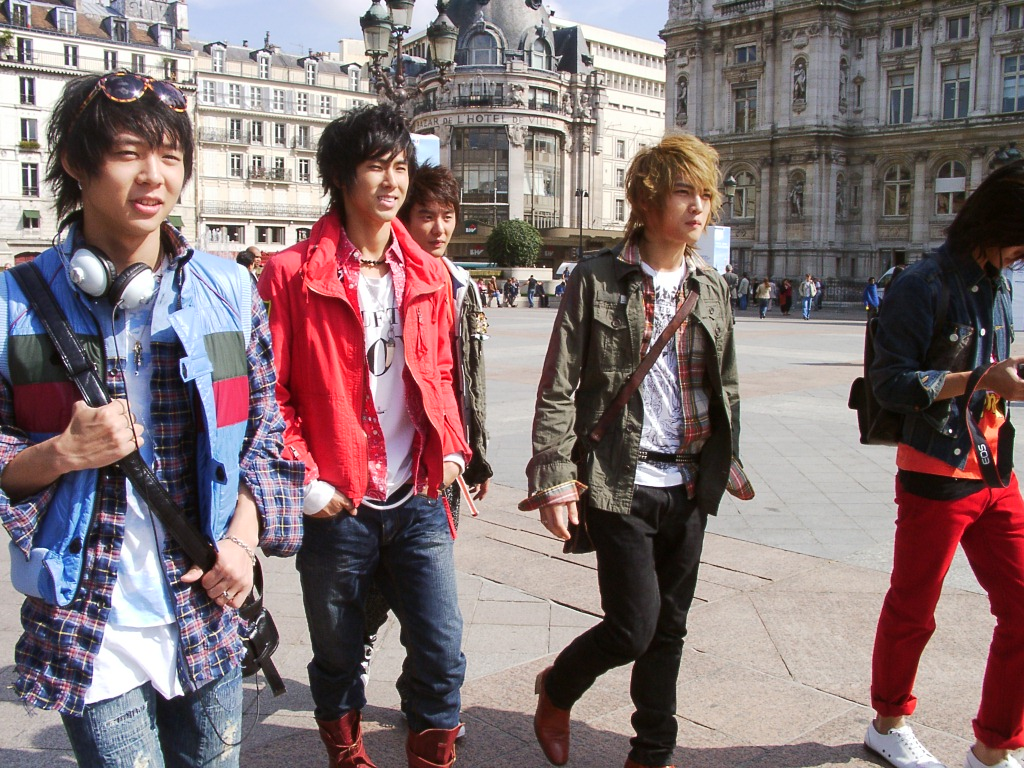
TVXQ (2006)

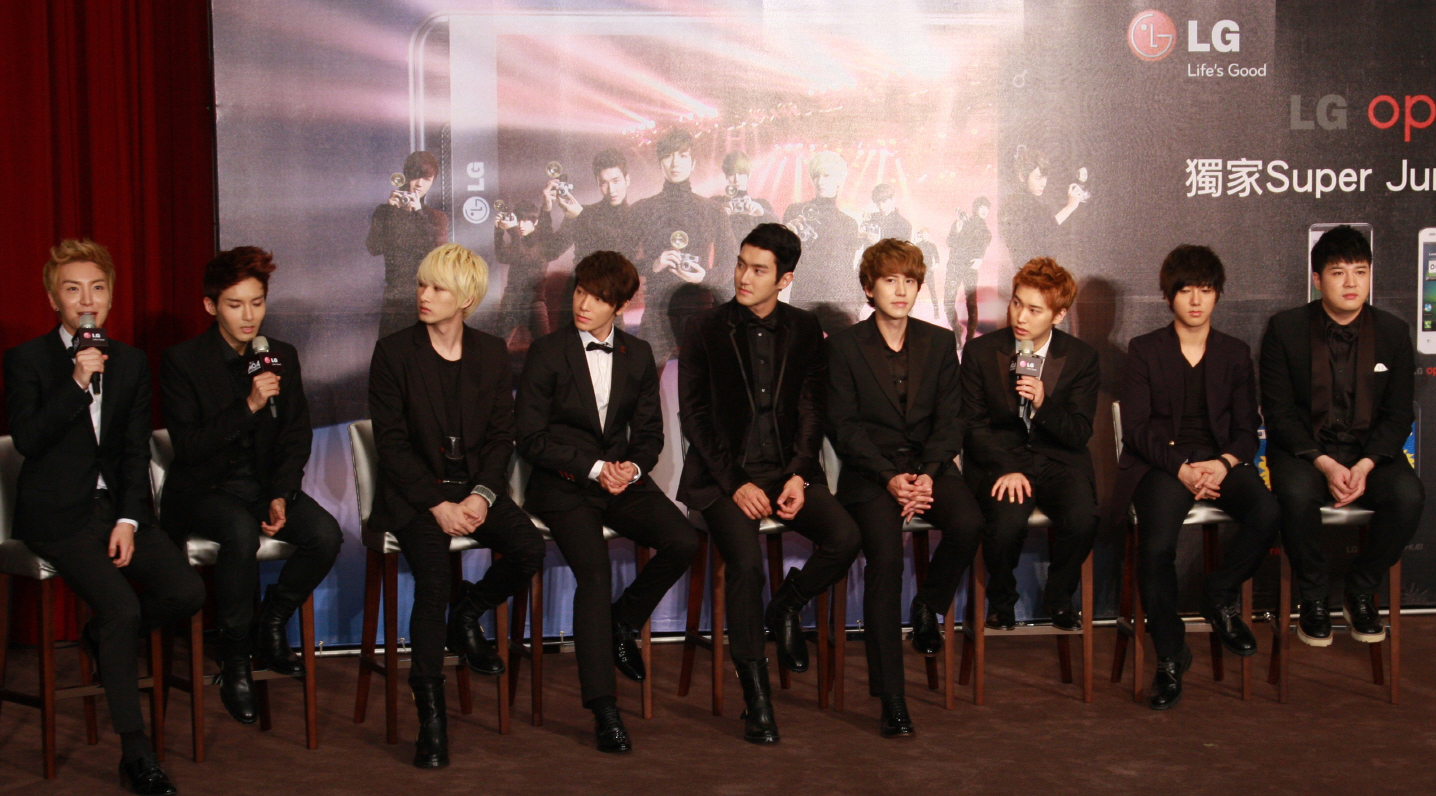
Super Junior (2007)

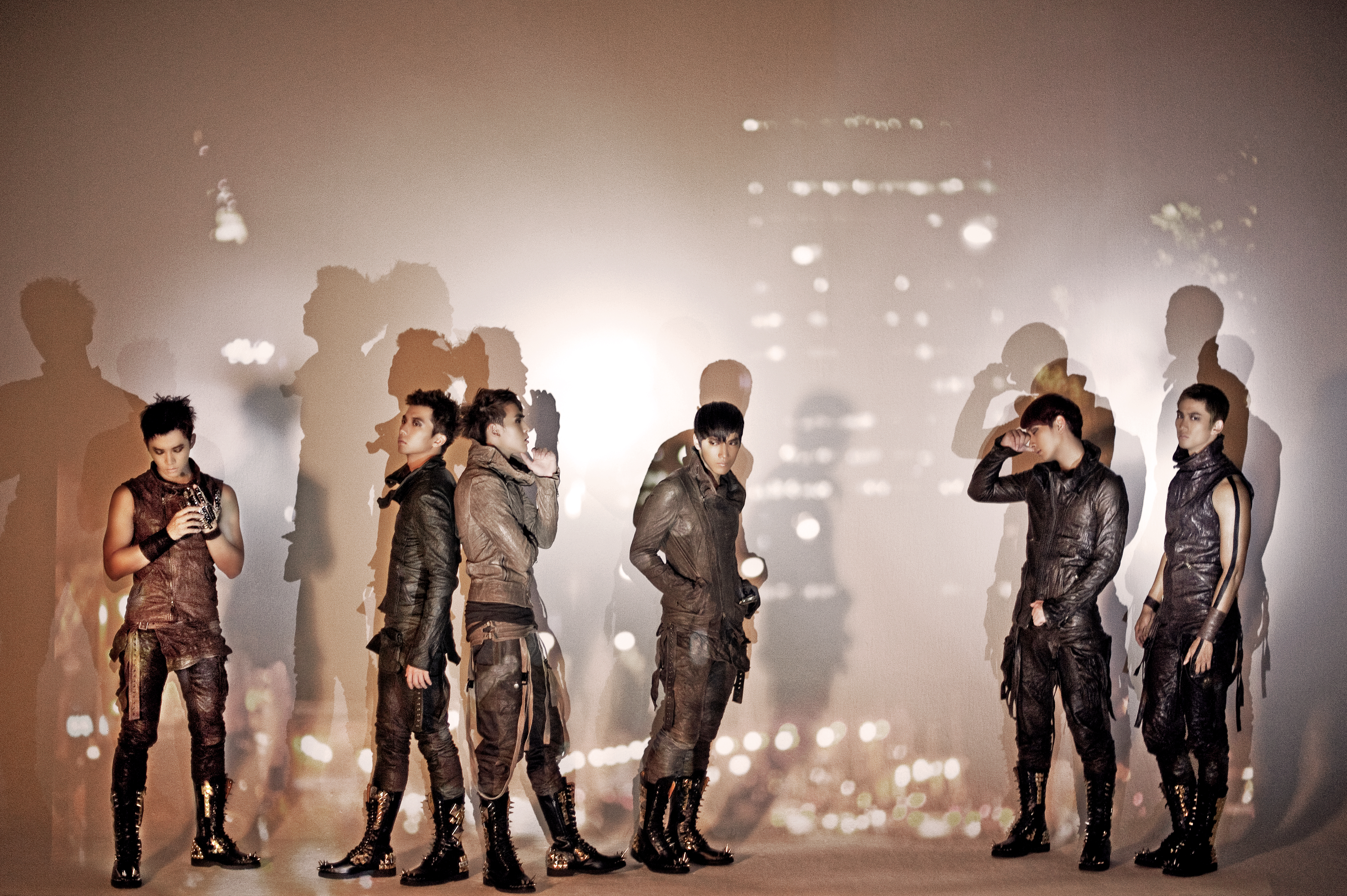
2PM (2009)

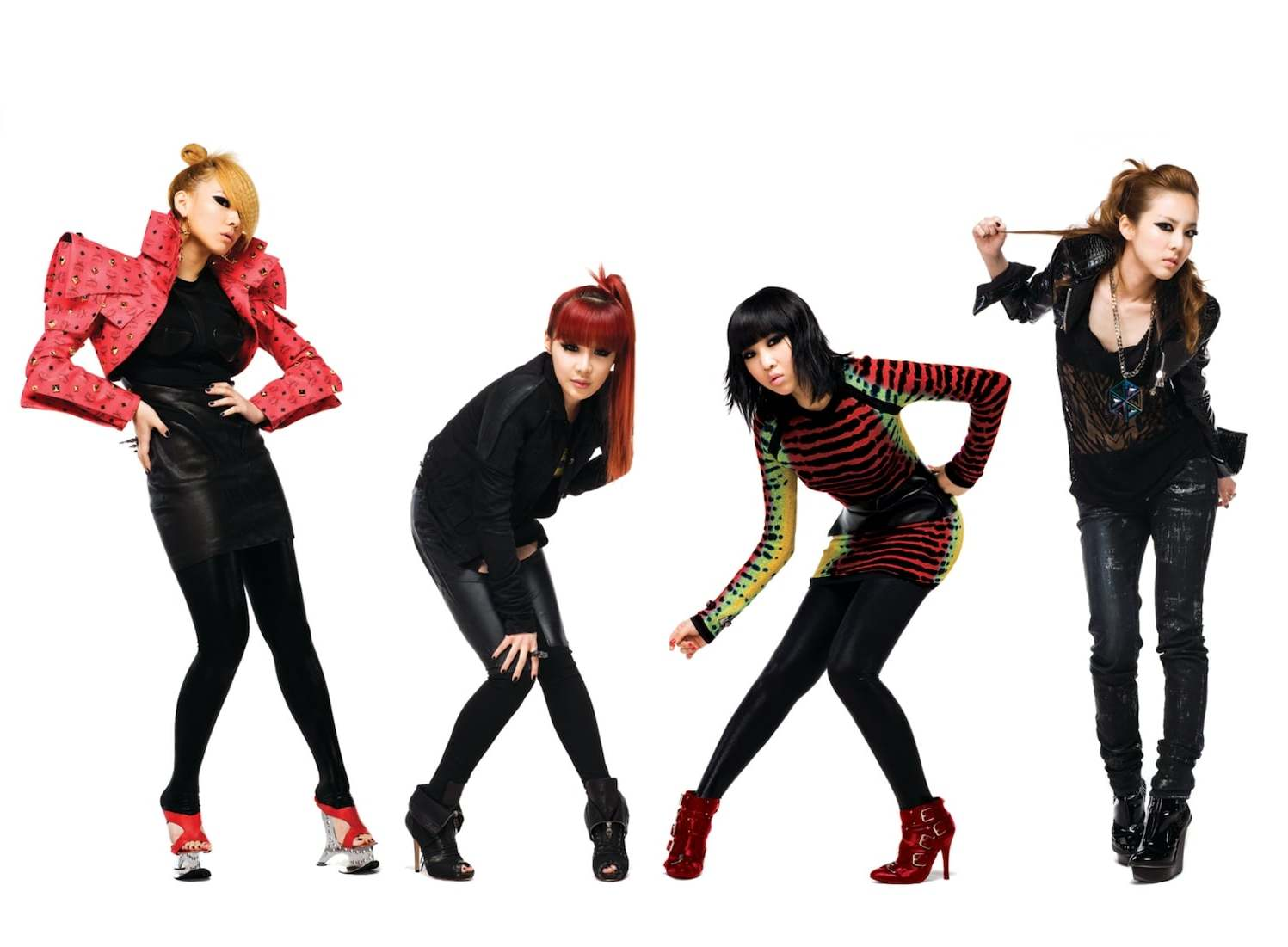
2NE1 (2010)

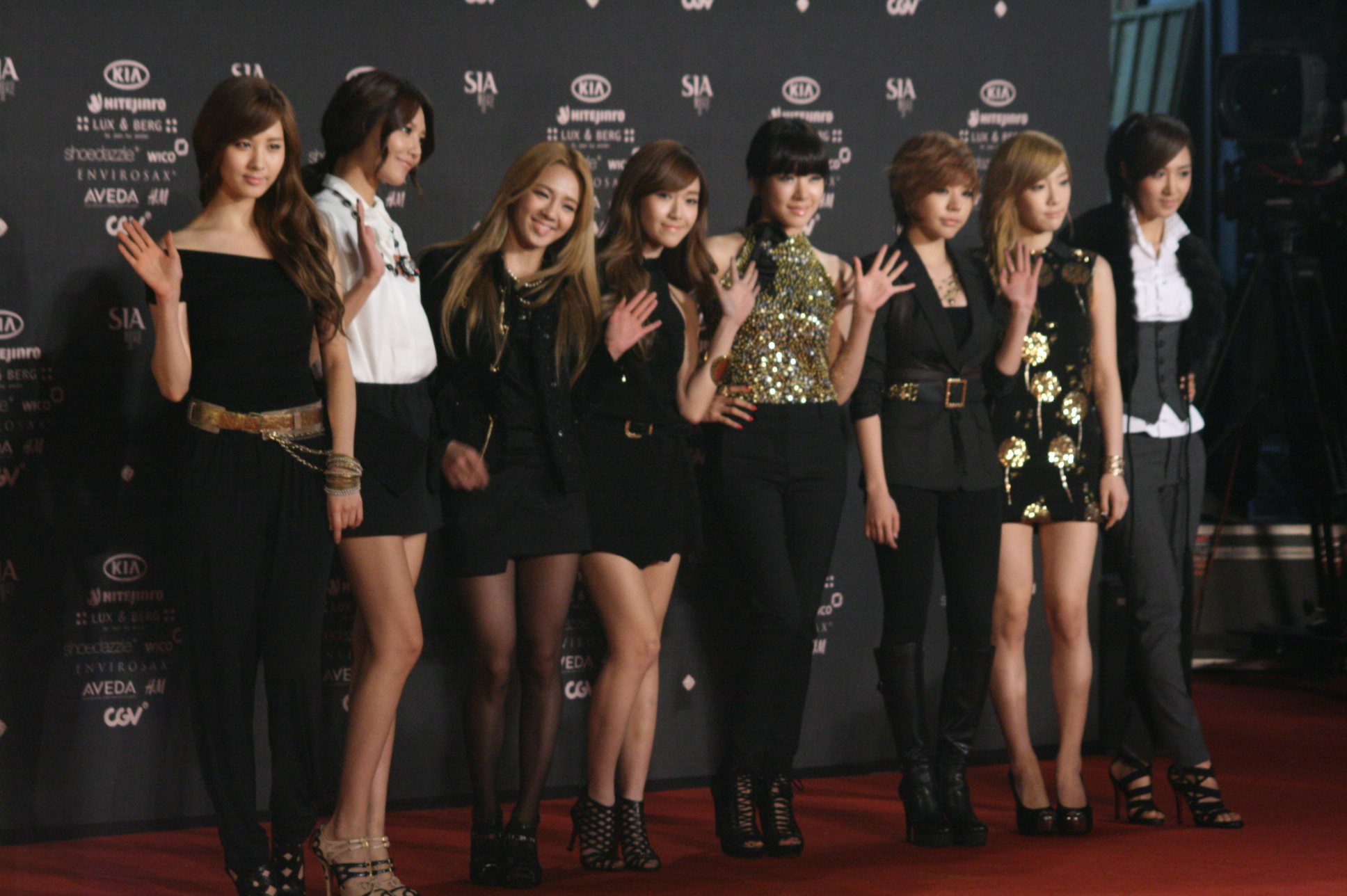
Girls' Generation (2011)

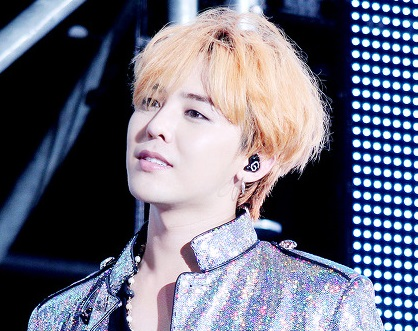
G-Dragon (2013, 2025)

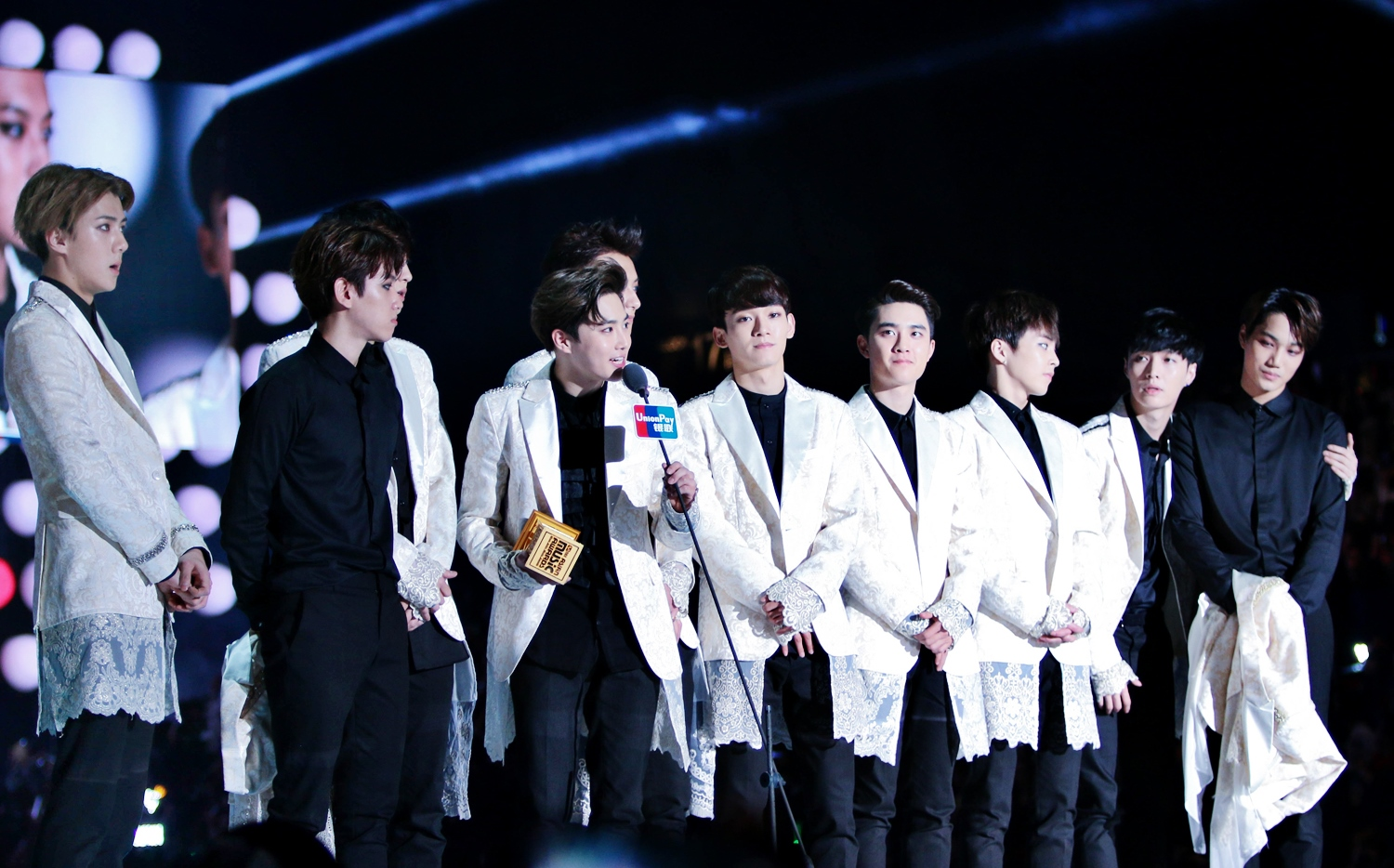
Exo (2014)

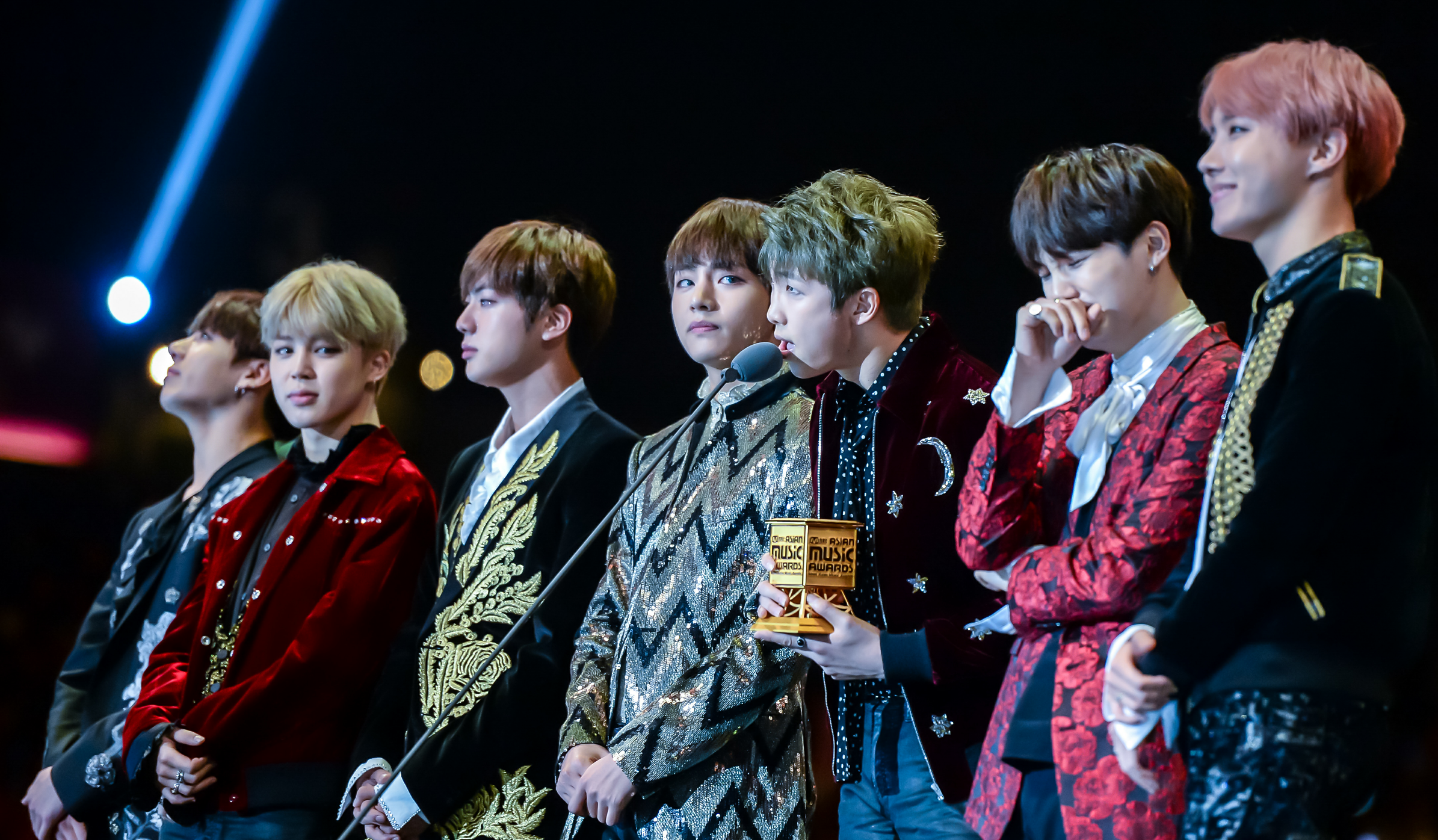
BTS (2016–22)

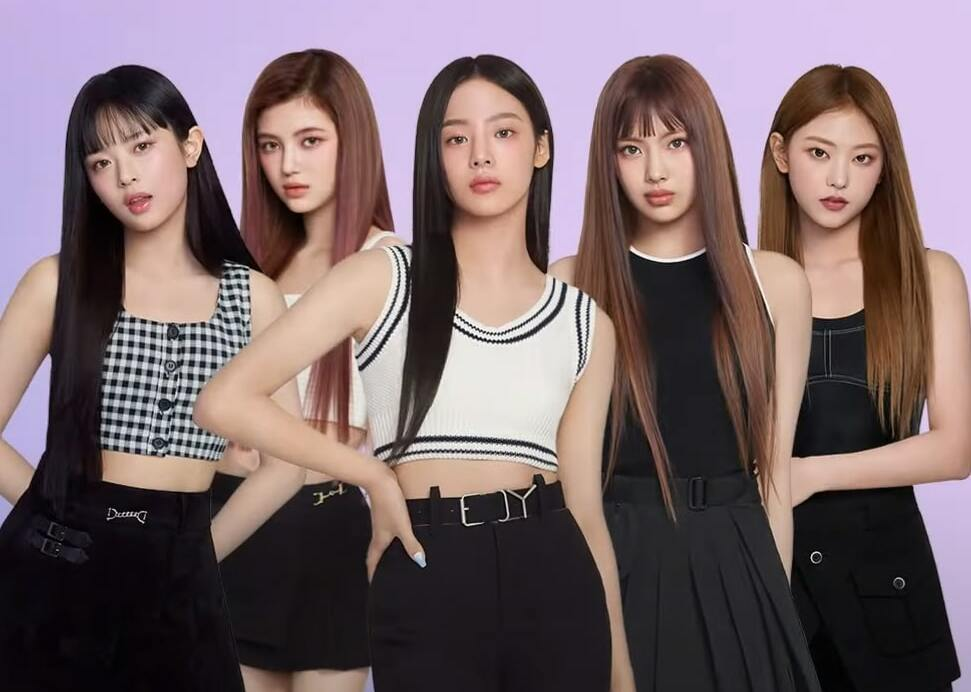
NewJeans (2023)

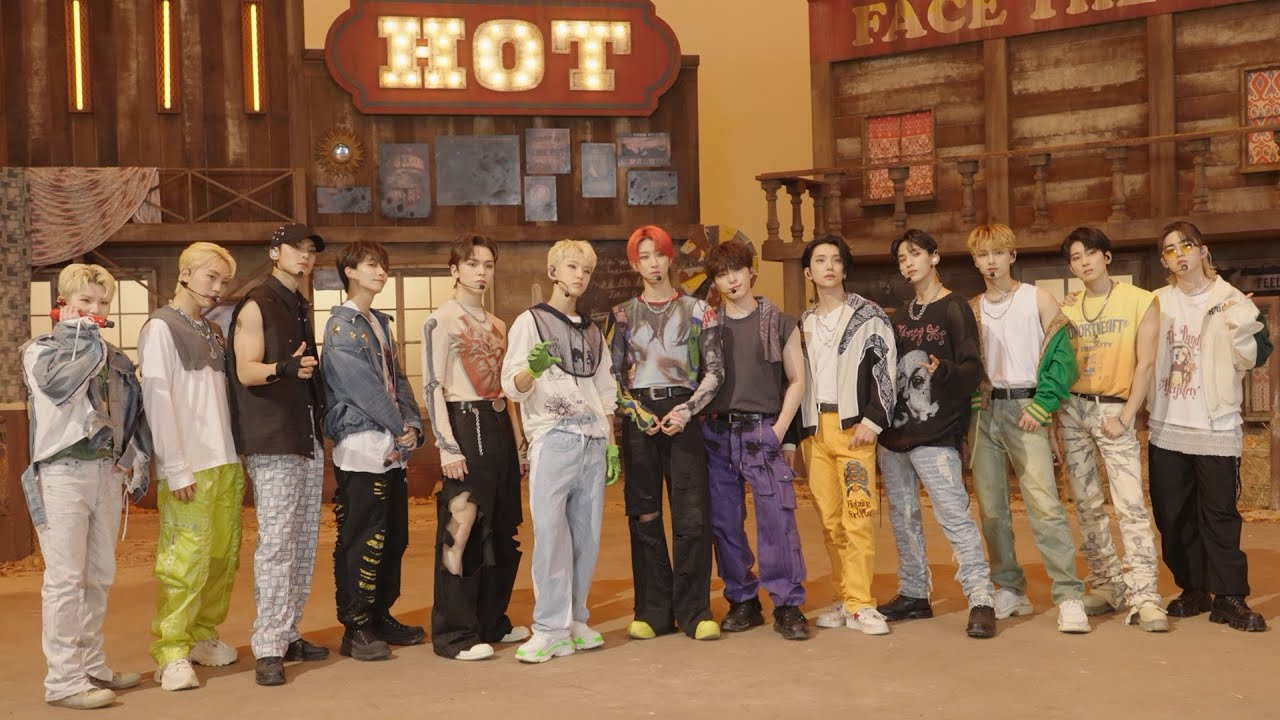
Seventeen (2024)

Winners are listed first and highlighted in bold.

=== 2000s ===
Year^{[I]}	Artist
2006	**TVXQ**
2006	Baek Ji-young
2006	Buzz
2006	Rain
2006	SG Wannabe
2007	**Super Junior**
2007	BigBang
2007	SG Wannabe
2007	Wonder Girls
2007	Yangpa
2008	**BigBang**
2008	Lee Hyori
2008	Seo Taiji
2008	TVXQ
2008	Wonder Girls
2009	**2PM**
2009	Shortlisted nominees not announced

=== 2010s ===
Year^{[I]}	Artist
2010	**2NE1**
2010	2AM
2010	2PM
2010	Girls' Generation
2010	Miss A
2011	**Girls' Generation**
2011	2NE1
2011	Beast
2011	BigBang
2011	IU
2012	**BigBang**
2012	Busker Busker
2012	Psy
2012	Sistar
2012	Super Junior
2013	**G-Dragon**
2013	Cho Yong-pil
2013	Exo
2013	Girls' Generation
2013	Psy
2014	**Exo**
2014	2NE1
2014	Girls' Generation
2014	IU
2014	Taeyang
2015	**BigBang**
2015	Exo
2015	Girls' Generation
2015	Shinee
2015	Zion.T
2016	**BTS**
2016	Exo
2016	GFriend
2016	Taeyeon
2016	Twice
2017	**BTS**
2017	Exo
2017	IU
2017	Twice
2017	Wanna One
2018	**BTS**
2018	Blackpink
2018	Mamamoo
2018	Twice
2018	Wanna One
2019	**BTS**
2019	Blackpink
2019	Chungha
2019	Exo
2019	Twice

=== 2020s ===
Year^{[I]}	Artist
2020	**BTS**
2020	Blackpink
2020	Exo
2020	IU
2020	Twice
2021	**BTS**
2021	Aespa
2021	IU
2021	NCT 127
2021	Oh My Girl
2022	**BTS**
2022	(G)I-dle
2022	Blackpink
2022	Ive
2022	Stray Kids
2023	**NewJeans**
2023	Ive
2023	NCT Dream
2023	Seventeen
2023	Stray Kids
2024	**Seventeen**
2024	Aespa
2024	Jungkook
2024	NewJeans
2024	Stray Kids
2025	**G-Dragon**
2025	Aespa
2025	Jennie
2025	Rosé
2025	Seventeen

^{^[I]} Each year is linked to the article about the Mnet Asian Music Awards held that year.

== Artists with multiple wins ==
Throughout the history of MAMA Awards only 3 recipients received the award more than once. BTS are the only artist to receive the award for consecutive years.

7 wins

- BTS

3 wins

- BigBang

2 wins

- G-Dragon

== Artists with multiple nominations ==
7 nominations

- BTS (Note: Additionally, 2024 nominee Jungkook is also a member of BTS)
- Exo

5 nominations

- Big Bang
- Girls' Generation (Note: Additionally, 2016 nominee Taeyeon is also a member of Girls' Generation)
- IU
- Twice

4 nominations

- Blackpink (Note: Additionally, 2025 nominees Jennie and Rosé are also members of Blackpink)

3 nominations

- 2NE1
- Aespa
- Seventeen
- Stray Kids

2 nominations

- 2PM
- G-Dragon
- Ive
- Psy
- NewJeans
- SG Wannabe
- Super Junior
- TVXQ
- Wanna One
- Wonder Girls

Note: Shortlisted nominations only
