= 2011 Mnet Asian Music Awards =

Music award

- Date: November 29, 2011
- Venue: Singapore Indoor Stadium, Singapore
- Hosted by: Lee Byung-hun
- Most awards: Super Junior, Girls' Generation, 2NE1, Baek Ji-young (2)
- Most nominations: 2NE1 (3)

Television/radio coverage
- Networks
- South Korea: Mnet; Japan: Mnet Japan, Music On! TV; Southeast Asia: tvN Asia; Thailand: Bang Channel
- Runtime: Approx. 210 minutes

The 2011 Mnet Asian Music Awards took place on November 29, 2011, at Singapore Indoor Stadium in Singapore. The ceremony was the second Mnet Asian Music Awards to occur outside of South Korea, the first being in 2010 when the ceremony took place in Macau, China. The 2011 award show was attended by over 10,000 people.

Super Junior won three awards, the most of the night, including Album of the Year for Mr. Simple, Best Male Group, and the special Singapore's Choice Award. Girls' Generation, 2NE1, and Baek Ji-young each won two awards.

== Background ==
The event marked the thirteenth of the annual music awards. With its slogan "Music Makes One", MAMA was broadcast live in China, Japan, Hong Kong and Southeast Asia through various channels, as well as in the US and Canada. It was co-hosted by Singapore broadcaster MediaCorp.

Artists Kim Hyun Joong, Beast, Miss A, Hyuna, Leessang, Koda Kumi, Vision Wei, Aziatix, Jane Zhang, and Seo In Young all won awards during the televised broadcast. On the other hand, Big Bang, CN Blue, and IU also won awards, but were not able to attend the ceremony. In total, there were twenty-five awards, including awards not given out during the broadcast of the awards ceremony. International artists are also seen with their greetings on screen including Namcha, Sodagreen, Nicholas Teo, Leo Ku, Natthew, Kwon Sang-woo, Jackie Chan, Quincy Jones, Joey Yung, Golf, Penny Tai, Eason Chan, Lollipop F, and Derrick Hoh.

== Performers ==
Name(s)	Performed	Notes
YB (Yoon Do Hyun Band), Dynamic Duo, Simon D, Sue Son	"It Burns"	"Music Makes One" (Opening Act)
Lang Lang and Beast, Trouble Maker	"Moonlight Sonata", "Trouble Maker", "Fiction"	"Moonlight Sonata"
Kumi Koda	"Ai no Uta", "V.I.P.", "Bling Bling Bling"	"Muse" (Hottest Asian Artist Award Recipient)
Miss A and Vision Wei	"Good Bye Baby", "Po Xiao", "Kung Fu Fighting"	"Asian Movement"
will.i.am and apl.de.ap ft. CL	"The Hardest Ever", "We Can Be Anything", "Where Is the Love?"	"will.i.am In MAMA" & "Heal Asia In Music"
Ulala Session	"Open Arms" & "Step By Step", "Sorry Sorry", "Ring Ding Dong", and "With You" Remix	
Jane Zhang	"I Believe"	"Super Voice Of China" (Best Asian Artist Recipient)
Kim Hyun-joong ft. Bae Suzy	"Lucky Guy"	"Love In Singapore"
Superstar K3 finalists	Acoustic set: "Shy Boy", "The Boys", "Good Bye Baby", "I Am the Best", "Mirror Mirror", "Roly-Poly"	(Best Dance Performance By A Female Group Nominees' Songs)
Girls' Generation	"The Boys" Korean and English versions	"Girls Become The Goddesses"
Super Junior	"Superman", "Mr. Simple", and "Sorry, Sorry"	"Mr. Super Clone"
2NE1	"Lonely" and "I Am the Best"	"Break Myself"
Snoop Dogg and Dr. Dre	"Drop It Like It's Hot" and "The Next Episode"	"Legendary Hip-Hop Stage"
DJ Koo	"Music Makes One"	(Finale)

== Presenters ==
2011 Mnet Asian Music Awards host

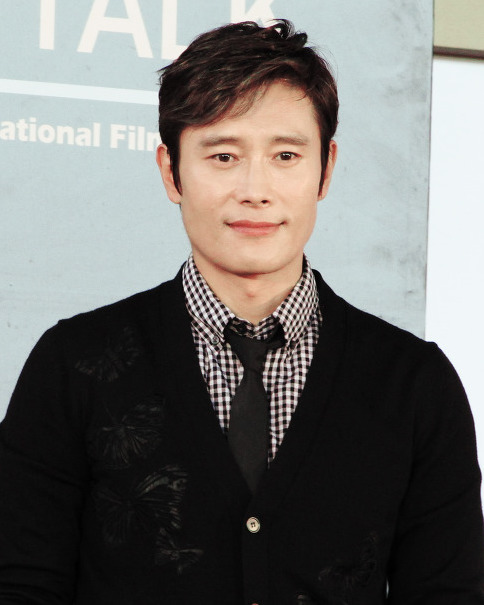
Lee Byung-hun

- Lee Byung-hun – welcome Address
- Miss A – presented Best New Male Artists
- Park Si-yeon – presented Best New Female Artists
- Dick Lee and Kit Chan – introduced performers Lang Lang and Beast, Singapore's Choice Award
- Song Seung-heon – introduced performer Koda Kumi and presented her with the Hottest Asian Artist Award
- Gong Hyung-jin and Fann Wong – presented Best New Asian Solo Artist and Best New Asian Group Artist
- Yura – Host/Entertainer
- Kim Sung-soo and Yoon Seung-ah – presented Best OST and Best Rap Performance
- Dynamic Duo, Yong Jun-hyung, and Yoon Doo-joon – introduced performers will.i.am and apl.de.ap of Black Eyed Peas
- Lee Byung-hun – introduced performers Ulala Session of Superstar K3
- Kim Soo-hyun and Nam Gyu-ri – presented Best Male Solo Artist and Best Female Solo Artist
- Song Joong-ki – introduced performer Jane Zhang and presented her with the Best Asian Artist Award
- Oh Ji-ho – presented Style in Music Award
- PK and Chrissa of Mnet America – Host/Entertainer
- Lang Lang and Park Si-yeon – presented Best Dance Performance - Male Group, introduced the Superstar K Finalists as performers and presented Best Dance Performance - Female Group
- Park Si-hoo and Kim Min-hee – presented Best Vocal Group Performance
- DJ Koo and Kang So-ra – presented Best Dance Performance - Solo
- Baek Ji-yeon – presented Mnet Specialized Award
- Bae Soo-bin and Han Chae-young – presented Best Male Group and Best Female Group
- Lee Byung-hun – introduced performers Snoop Dogg and Dr. Dre
- Ji Sung and Han Hyo-joo – presented Song of the Year
- Go Soo and Yoon Eun-hye – presented Artist of the Year
- Kim Hee-sun – presented Album of the Year

== Winners and nominees ==
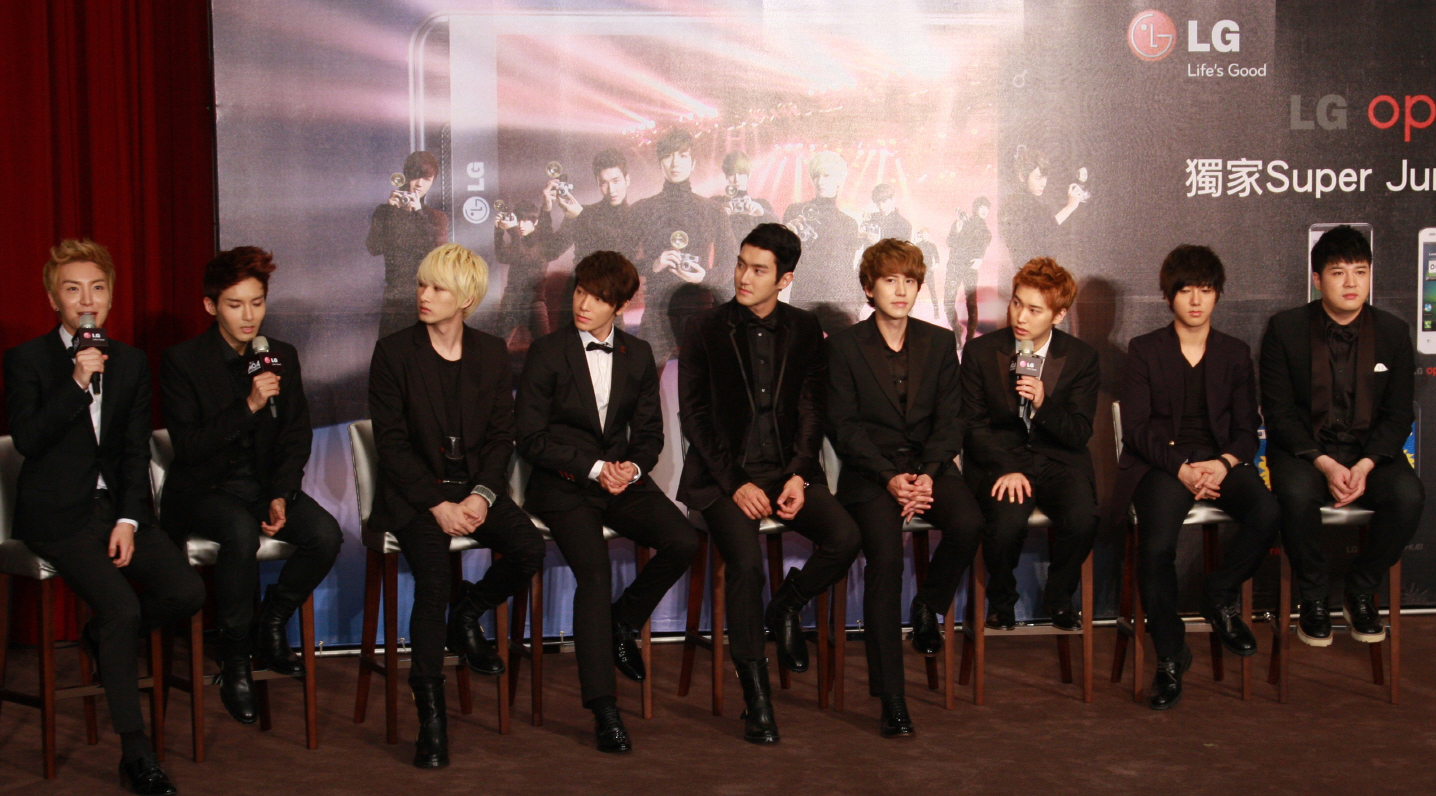
Super Junior, Won several awards including the Album of the Year

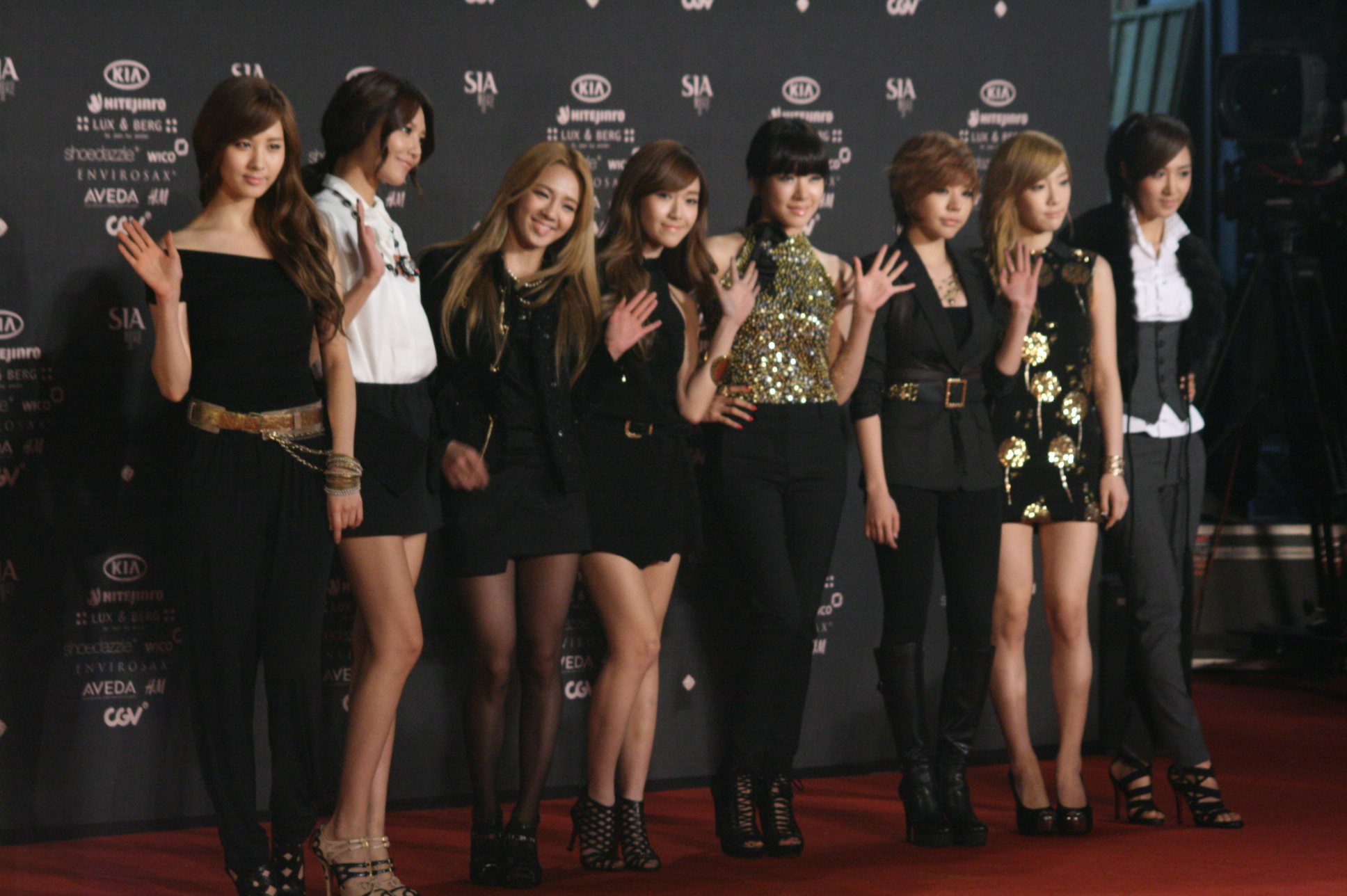
Girls' Generation, Artist of the Year and Best Female Group

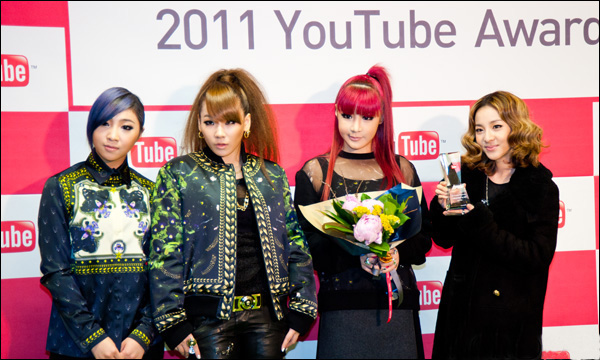
2NE1, Song of the Year and Best Vocal Performance – Group

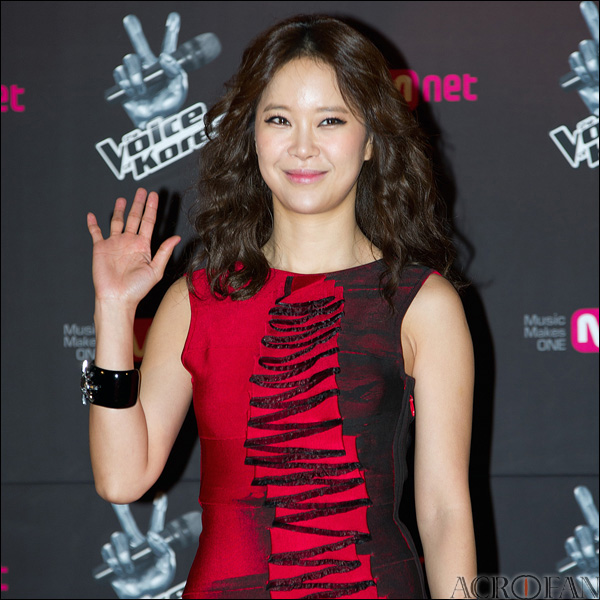
Baek Ji-young, Best Female Solo Artist and Best OST

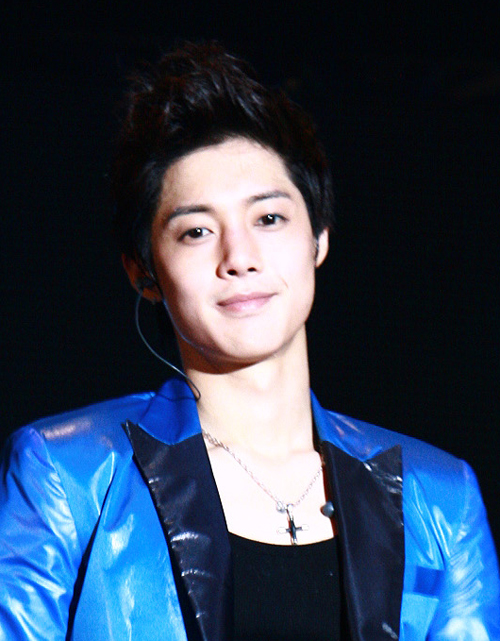
Kim Hyun-joong, Best Male Solo Artist

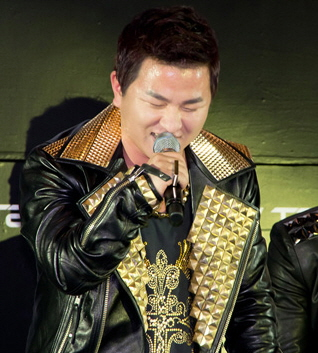
Huh Gak, Best New Male Artist

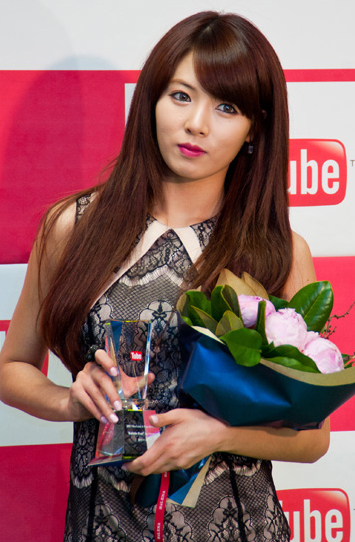
Hyuna, Best Dance Performance – Solo

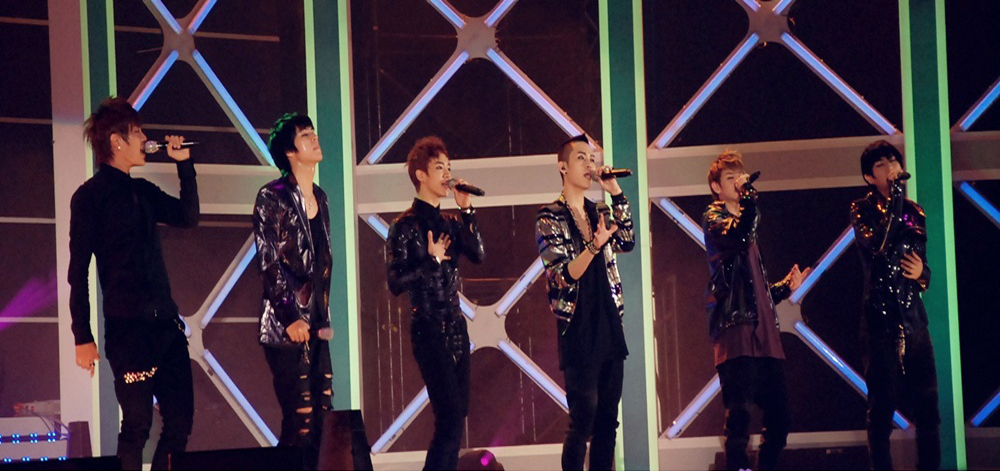
Beast, Best Dance Performance – Male Group

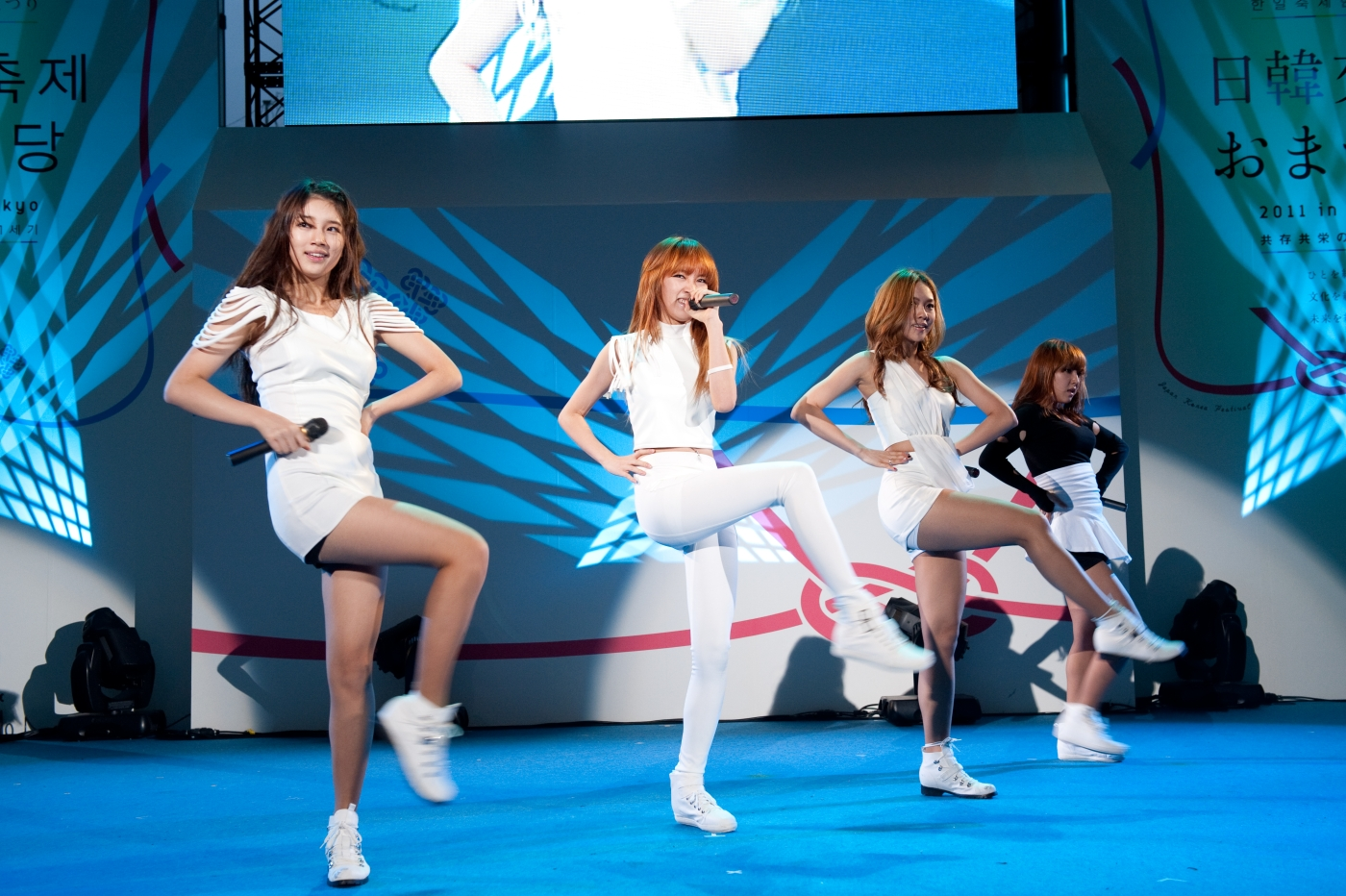
Miss A, Best Dance Performance – Female Group

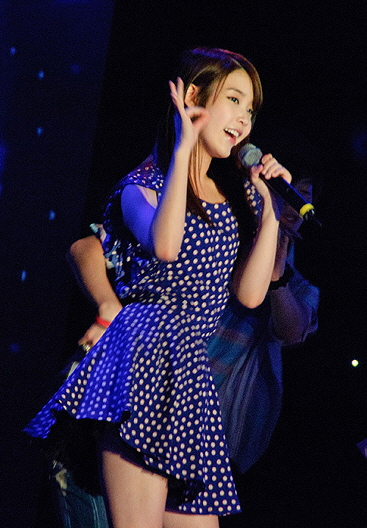
IU, Best Vocal Performance – Solo

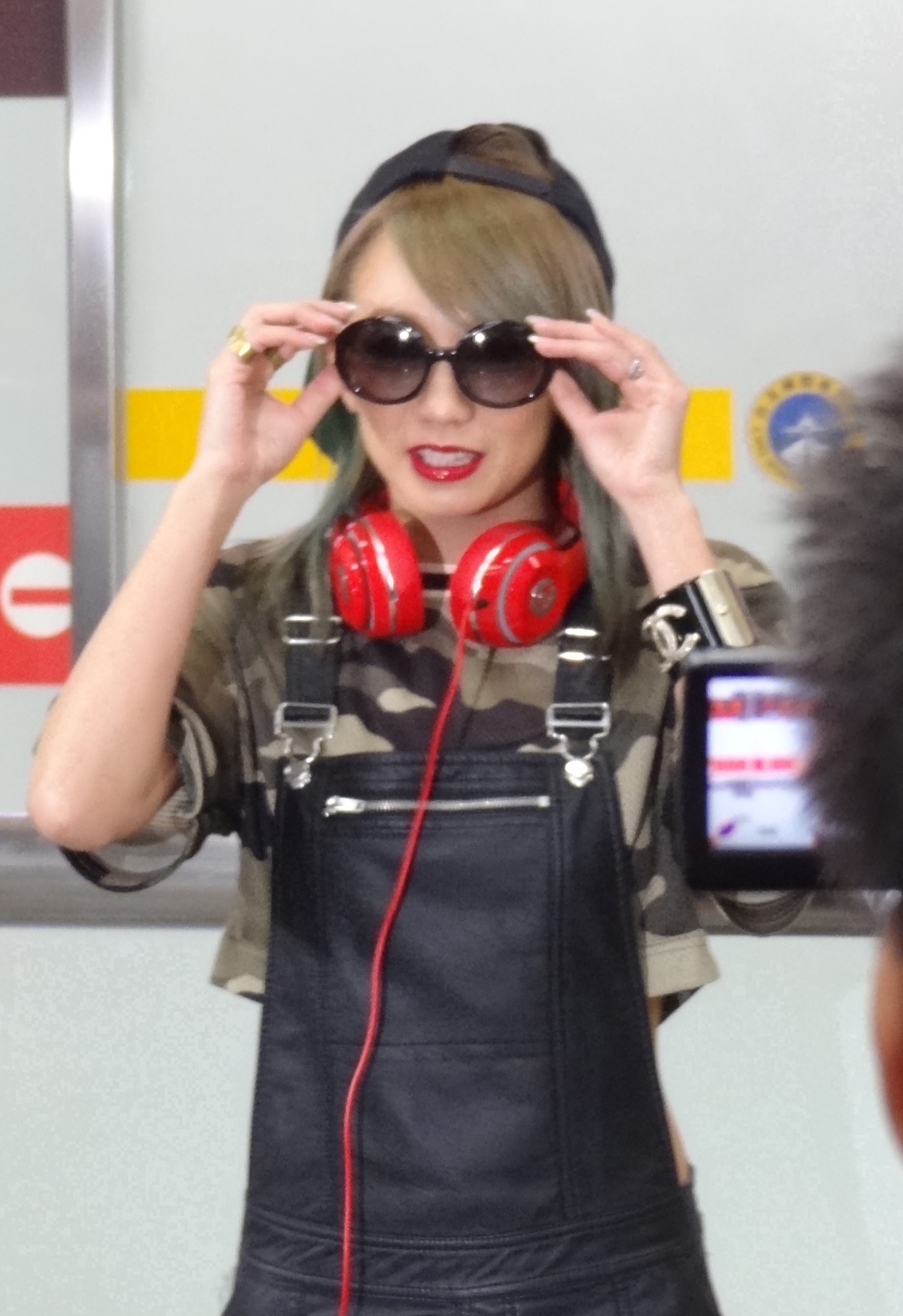
Koda Kumi, Hottest Asian Artist Award

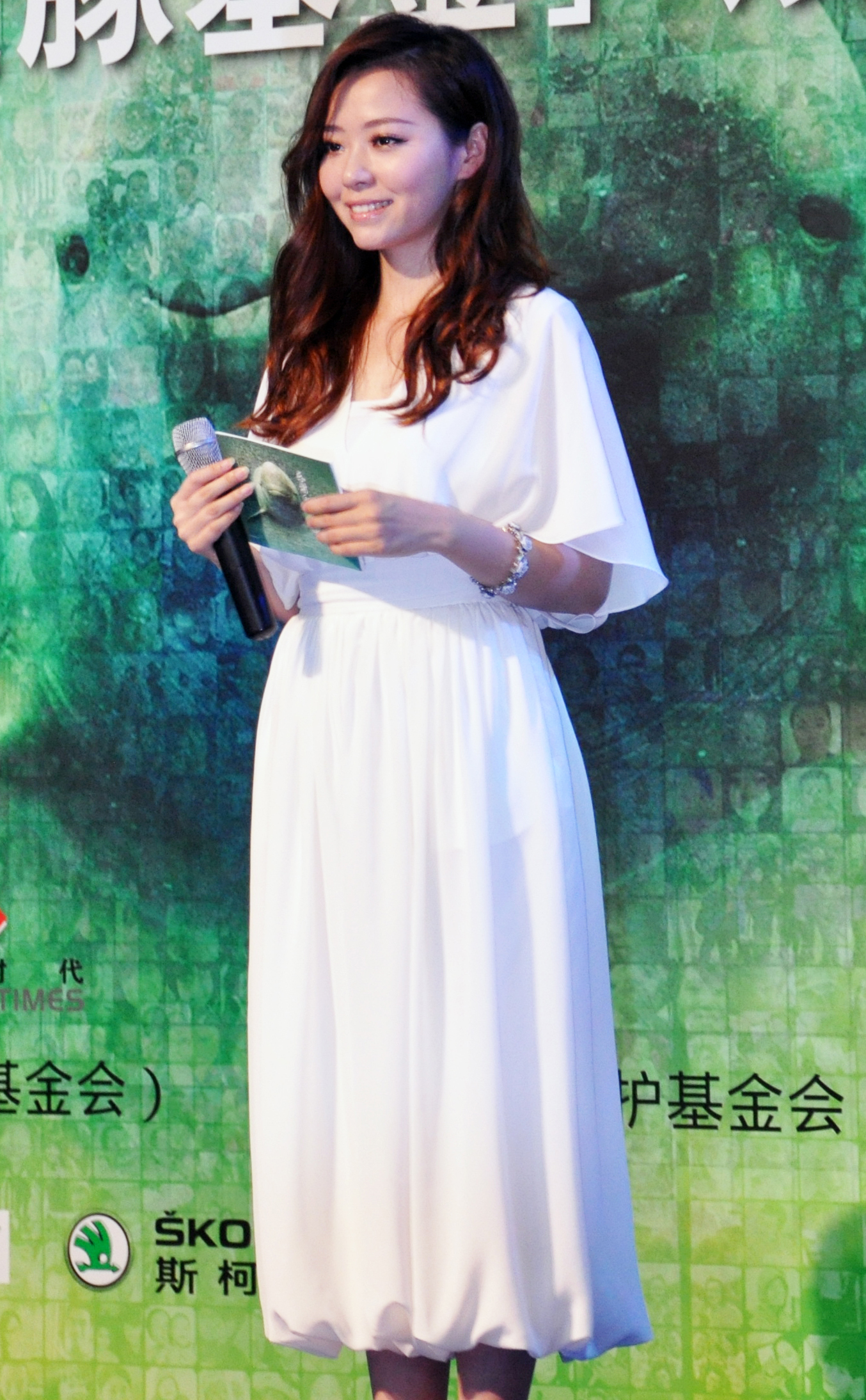
Jane Zhang, Best Asian Artist

Winners are listed first and highlighted in boldface.

Song of the Year (daesang)	Album of the Year (daesang)
**2NE1 – "I Am the Best"**; Leessang – "Turned off the TV"; Baek Ji-young – "That Woman"; Beast – "Fiction"; IU – "Good Day"	**Super Junior – Mr. Simple**; TVXQ – Keep Your Head Down; Big Bang – Tonight; Girls' Generation – The Boys; 2NE1 – 2NE1 2nd Mini Album
Artist of the Year (daesang)	Best Music Video
**Girls' Generation**; Beast; Big Bang; IU; 2NE1	**Big Bang – "Love Song"**; Brown Eyed Girls – "Sixth Sense"; Kiha & The Faces – "Just Know Each Other"; Sunny Hill – "Midnight Circus"; UV – "Itaewon Freedom"
Best Male Solo Artist	Best Female Solo Artist
**Kim Hyun-joong**; Kim Bum-soo; Kim Tae-woo; Sung Si-kyung; Wheesung	**Baek Ji-young**; Kim Wan-sun; Seo In-young; IU; G.NA
Best Male Group	Best Female Group
**Super Junior**; TVXQ; Beast; Big Bang; 2PM	**Girls' Generation**; Brown Eyed Girls; KARA; 2NE1; f(x)
Best Vocal Performance – Group	Best Vocal Performance – Solo
**2NE1 – "Lonely"**; Davichi – "Don't Say Goodbye"; SISTAR19 – "Ma Boy"; 2AM – "You Wouldn't Answer My Calls"; 4Men – "Once While Living"	**IU – "Good Day"**; Huh Gak – "Hello"; K.Will – "My Heart Beating"; Kim Gun-mo – "Today is More Sad Than Yesterday"; Lee Hyun – "You are the Best of My Life"
Best Dance Performance – Male Group	Best Dance Performance – Female Group
**Beast – "Fiction"**; TVXQ – "Keep Your Head Down"; Big Bang – "Tonight"; Super Junior – "Mr. Simple"; MBLAQ – "Mona Lisa"; Infinite – "Be Mine"	**Miss A – "Good Bye Baby"**; Girls' Generation – "The Boys"; Secret – "Shy Boy"; T-ara – "Roly-Poly"; 4Minute – "Mirror Mirror"; 2NE1 – "I Am the Best"
Best Dance Performance – Solo	Best Band Performance
**Hyuna – "Bubble Pop!"**; Kim Hyun-joong – "Break Down"; Jay Park – "Abandoned"; Jang Woo-hyuk – "Time is (L)over"; G.NA – "Black And White"	**CNBLUE** – **"Intuition"**; F.T. Island – "Hello Hello"; Kiha & The Faces – "Just Know Each Other"; Jaurim – "Idol"; YB – "Find the guy that dreams take away"
Best OST	Best Rap Performance
**Baek Ji-young – "That Woman" (Secret Garden)**; IU – "Someday" (Dream High); Yim Jae-bum – "Love" (City Hunter); Taeyeon – "I Love You" (Athena: Goddess of War); Huh Gak – "Please Don't Forget Me" (The Greatest Love)	**Leessang – "Turn Off The TV"**; Mighty Mouth – "Tok Tok"; Clover – "La Vida Loca"; Tablo – "Bad"; Simon D – "Cheerz"
Best New Male Artists	Best New Female Artists
**Huh Gak**; Kim Ji-soo; Boyfriend; N-Train; B1A4	**Apink**; Dal★Shabet; Brave Girls; Jaein Jang; Han Groo

Special awards

- Singapore's Choice Award: **Super Junior**
- Hottest Asian Artist Award: **Koda Kumi**
- Best New Asian Solo Artist: **Vision Wei**
- Best New Asian Group Artist: **Aziatix**
- Best Asian Artist: **Jane Zhang**
- Style in Music Award: **Seo In-young**
- Mnet Specialized Award: **YB (Yoon Do Hyun Band)**

== Multiple awards ==
=== Artist(s) with multiple wins ===
The following artist(s) received two or more wins (excluding the special awards):

Awards	Artist(s)
2	Super Junior
2	Girls' Generation
2	2NE1
2	Baek Ji-young

=== Artist(s) with multiple nominations ===
The following artist(s) received more than two nominations:

Nominations	Artist(s)
6	2NE1
5	Big Bang
5	IU
4	Girls' Generation
4	Beast
3	Super Junior
3	TVXQ
3	Baek Ji-young
3	Huh Gak

== Presenters and performers ==
The following individuals and groups, listed in order of appearance, presented awards or performed musical numbers.
