= Lee Hyori discography =

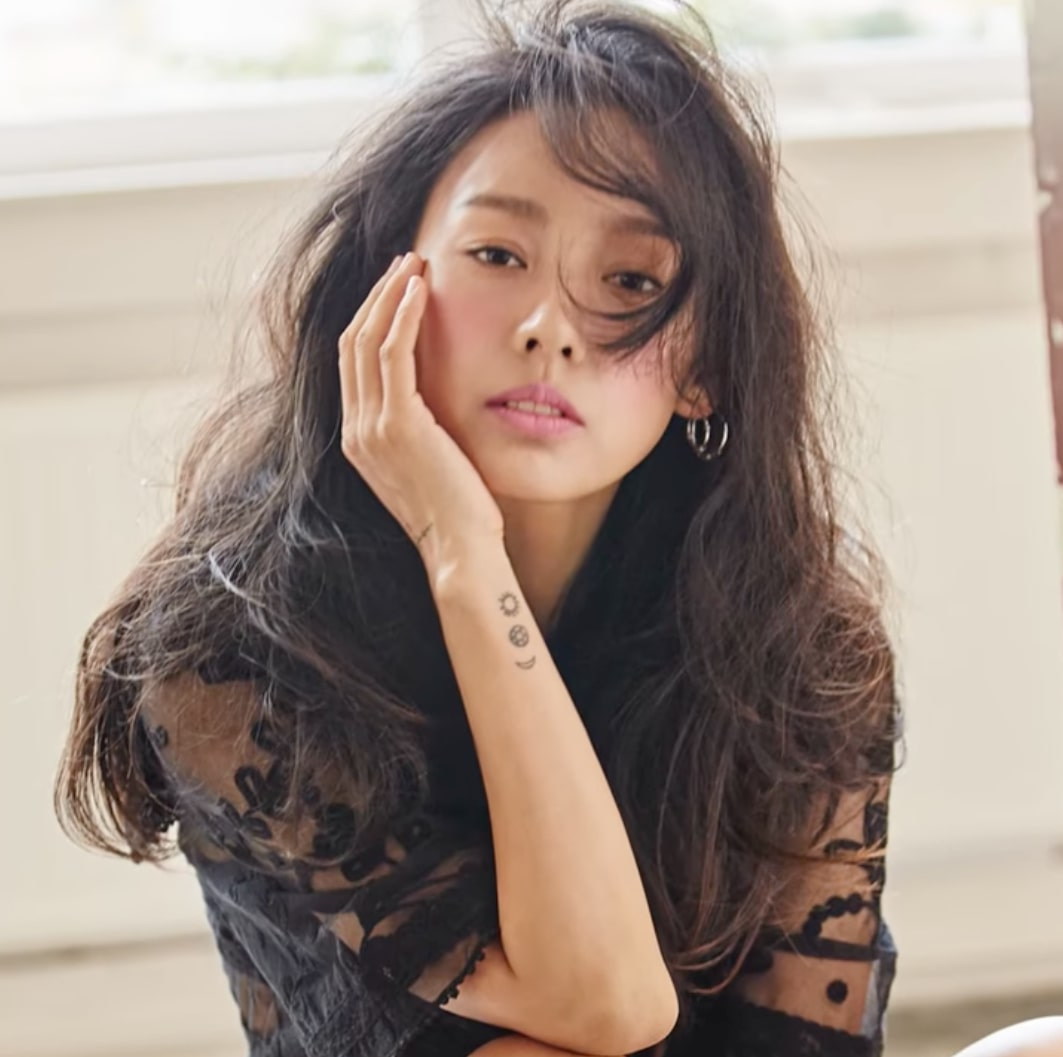
- Lee in 2017
- Studio albums: 6
- Singles: 24
- Music videos: 19

The discography of Lee Hyori consists of six studio albums and twenty-four singles. Since breaking away from Fin.K.L in 2003, Lee has sold over 400,000 albums and seven million digital singles in South Korea.

== Studio albums ==
| Title | Details | Peak chart positions | | Sales |
| Title | Details | KOR MIAK | KOR Gaon | Sales |
|---|---|---|---|---|
| Stylish... | Released: August 13, 2003; Label: DSP Media; Format: CD, digital download | 3 | — | KOR: 170,000 |
| Dark Angel | Released: February 9, 2006; Label: DSP Media; Format: Cassette, CD, digital download | — | — | KOR: 100,000 |
| It's Hyorish | Released: July 15, 2008; Label: Mnet Media; Format: CD, digital download | 1 | — | KOR: 100,000 |
| H-Logic | Released: April 8, 2010; Label: B2M Entertainment; Format: CD, digital download | — | 15 | KOR: 31,756 |
| Monochrome | Released: May 21, 2013; Label: B2M Entertainment; Format: CD, digital download | — | 4 | KOR: 16,868 |
| Black | Released: July 4, 2017; Label: Kiwi Media Group; Format: CD, digital download | — | 9 | KOR: 3,792 |

== Singles ==
| Title | Year | Peak chart positions | | Sales | Album |
| Title | Year | KOR (Note: The Gaon Digital Chart was launched in 2010.) | KOR Hot | Sales | Album |
|---|---|---|---|---|---|
| "10 Minutes" | 2003 | — | — | | Stylish... |
| "Hey Girl" | 2003 | — | — | | Stylish... |
| "Remember Me" | 2003 | — | — | | Stylish... |
| "Get Ya!" | 2006 | — | — | | Dark Angel |
| "Shall We Dance?" | 2006 | — | — | | Dark Angel |
| "Straight Up" | 2006 | — | — | | Dark Angel |
| "Toc Toc Toc" (톡톡톡) | 2007 | 1 (Note: Peaked at number 1 on the monthly MIAK album chart for March 2007.) | — | KOR: 31,048 (phy.) | If in Love... Like Them: OST |
| "Cat on the Roof" (지붕 위의 고양이) | 2008 | — | — | | Off the Record: Lee Hyori: OST |
| "U-Go-Girl" (featuring Nassun) | 2008 | 1 | — | | It's Hyorish |
| "Hey Mr. Big" | 2008 | — | — | | It's Hyorish |
| "Swing" (그네) (featuring Gary of Leessang) | 2010 | 1 | — | KOR: 1,180,000 | H-Logic |
| "Chitty Chitty Bang Bang" (featuring Ceejay of Freshboyz) | 2010 | 1 | — | KOR: 2,054,000 | H-Logic |
| "Please Stay Behind" (남아 주세요) | 2011 | 86 | — | KOR: 91,000 | Non-album singles |
| "Remember" (기억해) | 2011 | 82 | — | KOR: 151,000 | Non-album singles |
| "Miss Korea" (미스코리아) | 2013 | 1 | 3 | KOR: 1,030,000 | Monochrome |
| "Bad Girls" | 2013 | 1 | 1 | KOR: 911,000 | Monochrome |
| "Don't Cry" | 2014 | 36 | — | KOR: 60,000 | I Need Romance 3 OST |
| "Seoul" | 2017 | 21 | — | KOR: 126,000 | Black |
| "Black" | 2017 | 26 | — | KOR: 68,000 | Black |
| "Do the Dance" | 2021 | — | — | | 2021 MAMA Special Album |
| "I'm Happy From Today" (오늘부터 행복한 나) (featuring Lee Sang-soon) | 2022 | — | — | | Two Track Project' Vol.3 |
| "Don't Forget Me" ('날 잊지 말아요) | 2022 | — | — | | Coco Sooni OST |
| "Hoodie e Banbaji" | 2023 | 130 | — | | Non-album single |
"—" denotes releases that did not chart or were not released in that region. "*" denotes that chart did not exist at the time of release.

=== Promotional singles ===
| Title | Year | Album |
|---|---|---|
| "Anymotion" (featuring Eric Mun) | 2005 | Non-album singles |
| "Anyclub" (featuring Teddy Park & Kim Ji-eun) | 2005 | Non-album singles |
| "Anystar" (featuring Lee Joon-gi) | 2006 | Non-album singles |
| "Pretty" (이뻐요) (featuring Yoon Gun) | 2009 | Non-album singles |
| "As Long as I Love You" (featuring Will Pan) | 2009 | Non-album singles |

== Other charted songs ==
| Title | Year | Peak chart positions | | Sales | Album |
| Title | Year | KOR | KOR Hot | Sales | Album |
|---|---|---|---|---|---|
| "Bring It Back" (featuring Bekah and Jeon Ji-yoon) | 2010 | 5 | —N/a | —N/a | H-Logic |
| "How Did We Get" (featuring Daesung) | 2010 | 8 | —N/a | —N/a | H-Logic |
| "I'm Back" | 2010 | 11 | —N/a | —N/a | H-Logic |
| "Love Sign" (featuring Sangchu of Mighty Mouth) | 2010 | 13 | —N/a | —N/a | H-Logic |
| "Highlight" (featuring Bizzy) | 2010 | 15 | —N/a | —N/a | H-Logic |
| "Scandal" | 2010 | 16 | —N/a | —N/a | H-Logic |
| "Get 2 Know" (featuring Double K) | 2010 | 17 | —N/a | —N/a | H-Logic |
| "Feel the Same" | 2010 | 19 | —N/a | —N/a | H-Logic |
| "Memory" (featuring Bizzy) | 2010 | 23 | —N/a | —N/a | H-Logic |
| "100 Percent" | 2010 | 26 | —N/a | —N/a | H-Logic |
| "Want Me Back" | 2010 | 27 | —N/a | —N/a | H-Logic |
| "So Cold" | 2010 | 28 | —N/a | —N/a | H-Logic |
| "Love Radar" (featuring Beenzino of Jazzyfact) | 2013 | 27 | 19 | KOR: 168,000 | Monochrome |
| "Amor Mio" (Duet with Bak Ji-yong of Honey G) | 2013 | 49 | 36 | KOR: 103,000 | Monochrome |
| "Holly Jolly Bus" (featuring Soonshim the Dog) | 2013 | 53 | 54 | KOR: 83,000 | Monochrome |
| "I Hate Myself" | 2013 | 68 | 67 | KOR: 58,000 | Monochrome |
| "Going Crazy" (featuring Ahn Young-mi) | 2013 | 69 | 74 | KOR: 60,000 | Monochrome |
| "Special" | 2013 | 80 | 76 | KOR: 52,000 | Monochrome |
| "Bounced Checks of Love" | 2013 | 86 | 89 | KOR: 50,000 | Monochrome |
| "Full Moon" | 2013 | 87 | 99 | KOR: 51,000 | Monochrome |
| "Trust Me" | 2013 | 90 | 100 | KOR: 48,000 | Monochrome |
| "Somebody" | 2013 | 98 | — | KOR: 46,000 | Monochrome |
| "Wouldn't Ask You" | 2013 | 110 | — | KOR: 43,000 | Monochrome |
| "Show Show Show" | 2013 | 113 | — | KOR: 43,000 | Monochrome |
| "Better Together" | 2013 | 122 | — | KOR: 41,000 | Monochrome |
| "Oars" | 2013 | 125 | — | KOR: 39,000 | Monochrome |
"—" denotes releases that did not chart or were not released in that region.

== Music videos ==
| Title | Year | Director |
|---|---|---|
| "10 Minutes" | 2003 | Seo Hyeon-seung |
| "Hey Girl" | 2003 | —N/a |
| "Anymotion" | 2005 | Cha Eun-taek |
| "Anyclub" | 2005 | Cha Eun-taek |
| "Get Ya!" | 2006 | Cha Eun-taek |
| "Shall We Dance?" | 2006 | Seo Hyeon-seung |
| "Straight Up" | 2006 | —N/a |
| "Anystar" | 2006 | Cha Eun-taek |
| "Toc Toc Toc" | 2007 | Cha Eun-taek |
| "U-Go-Girl" | 2008 | Cha Eun-taek |
| "Hey Mr. Big" | 2008 | Seo Hyeon-seung |
| "As Long as I Love You" | 2009 | —N/a |
| "Swing" | 2010 | Cha Eun-taek |
| "Chitty Chitty Bang Bang" | 2010 | Cha Eun-taek |
| "Miss Korea" | 2013 | Cha Eun-taek |
| "Bad Girls" | 2013 | Cha Eun-taek |
| "Amor Mio" | 2013 | —N/a |
| "Going Crazy" | 2013 | —N/a |
| "Seoul" | 2017 | Lumpens |
| "Black" | 2017 | Lumpens |
