= List of awards and nominations received by Lee Hyori =

Lee Hyori awards and nominations
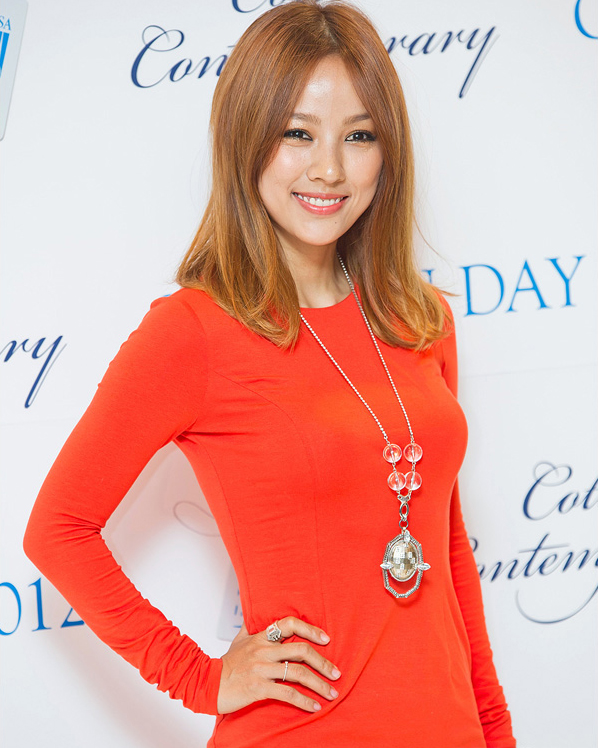
- Lee in 2012
Awards and nominations
Award	Wins	Nominations

Totals (Note: Certain award groups do not simply award one winner. They acknowledge several different recipients, have runners-up, and have third place. Since this is a specific recognition and is different from losing an award, runner-up mentions are considered wins in this award tally. For simplification and to avoid errors, each award in this list has been presumed to have had a prior nomination.)
- Wins: 36
- Nominations: 53

This is a list of awards and nominations received by South Korean singer Lee Hyori.

== Awards and nominations ==
Name of award ceremony, year presented, award category, nominee of award, and result of nomination
Award ceremony	Year	Category	Nominee / work	Result	Ref.
Blue Dragon Series Awards	2022	Best Female Entertainer	Seoul Check-in	Nominated	
Dong-A.com's Pick	2020	Always Superstar Award	Lee Hyori	Won	
Golden Disc Awards	2003	Grand Prize (Daesang)	Stylish...E	Nominated	
Golden Disc Awards	2003	Main Prize (Bonsang)	Stylish...E	Won	
KBS Entertainment Awards	2002	Best Newcomer (Variety)	Lee Hyori	Won	
KBS Music Awards	2003	Grand Prize (Daesang)	"10 Minutes"	Won	
KBS Music Awards	2003	Main Prize (Bonsang)	"10 Minutes"	Won	
KMTV Music Awards	2003	Artist of the Year	Lee Hyori	Won	
Korea Advertise Festival	2003	Netizen Best Female Model	Lee Hyori	Won	
Korea Advertise Festival	2007	Netizen Best Female Model	Lee Hyori	Won	
Korean Music Arts Festival	2003	Best Female Singer Star	Lee Hyori	Won	
MBC Entertainment Awards	2020	Best Couple Award (with Yoo Jae-suk)	Hangout with Yoo	Won	
MBC Entertainment Awards	2020	Best Couple Award (with Bi-ryong)	Hangout with Yoo	Nominated	
MBC Entertainment Awards	2020	Top Excellence Award in Music/Talk Category – Female	Hangout with Yoo	Won	
MBC Music Awards	2003	Main Prize (Bonsang)	Lee Hyori	Won	
Mnet Asian Music Awards	2003	Most Popular Music Video (Daesang)	"10 Minutes"	Won	
Mnet Asian Music Awards	2003	Best Dance Performance	"10 Minutes"	Nominated	
Mnet Asian Music Awards	2003	Best Female Artist	"10 Minutes"	Nominated	
Mnet Asian Music Awards	2006	Best Female Artist	"Shall We Dance?"	Nominated	
Mnet Asian Music Awards	2007	Best Female Artist	"Toc Toc Toc"	Nominated	
Mnet Asian Music Awards	2008	Best Female Artist	"U-Go-Girl"	Won	
Mnet Asian Music Awards	2008	Best Dance Performance	"U-Go-Girl"	Won	
Mnet Asian Music Awards	2008	Song of the Year	"U-Go-Girl"	Nominated	
Mnet Asian Music Awards	2008	Artist of the Year	Lee Hyori	Nominated	
Mnet Asian Music Awards	2010	Best Dance Performance – Solo	"Chitty Chitty Bang Bang" (ft. Ceejay)	Nominated	
Mnet Asian Music Awards	2010	Best Female Artist	Lee Hyori	Nominated	
Mnet Asian Music Awards	2013	Best Female Artist	Lee Hyori	Won	
Mnet Asian Music Awards	2013	Best Dance Performance – Female Solo	"Bad Girls"	Nominated	
Mnet Asian Music Awards	2017	Best Dance Performance – Female Solo	"Black"	Nominated	
Mnet Asian Music Awards	2017	Song of the Year	"Black"	Longlisted	
Mnet 20's Choice Awards	2007	Hot Style Icon	Lee Hyori	Won	
Mnet 20's Choice Awards	2008	Hot Style Icon	Lee Hyori	Won	
Mnet 20's Choice Awards	2008	Hot Performance Musician	Lee Hyori	Won	
Mnet 20's Choice Awards	2009	Hot Style Icon	Lee Hyori	Won	
Mnet 20's Choice Awards	2009	Hot Multitainer	Lee Hyori	Won	
Mnet 20's Choice Awards	2009	Hot Body	Lee Hyori	Won	
Mnet 20's Choice Awards	2012	20's Social Artist	Lee Hyori	Won	
Mnet 20's Choice Awards	2013	20's Style	Lee Hyori	Nominated	
Mnet 20's Choice Awards	2013	Blue Carpet Popularity Award	Lee Hyori	Won	
Mnet 20's Choice Awards	2013	20's Online Music	"Bad Girls"	Nominated	
Mnet 20's Choice Awards	2013	20's Voice	Lee Hyori	Nominated	
Mnet 20's Choice Awards	2013	Icon of 20's	Lee Hyori	Won	
SBS Entertainment Awards	2008	Grand Prize (Daesang)	Change, Family Outing	Nominated	
SBS Entertainment Awards	2009	Grand Prize (Daesang) (with Yoo Jae-suk)	Family Outing	Won	
SBS Entertainment Awards	2009	Netizen Best Popular Award	Family Outing	Won	
SBS Entertainment Awards	2009	Best Teamwork Award	Family Outing	Won	
SBS Entertainment Awards	2010	SBS 20th Anniversary Entertainment Top 10 Star Award	Lee Hyori	Won	
SBS Music Awards	2003	Main Prize (Bonsang)	Lee Hyori	Won	
SBS Music Awards	2003	Grand Prize (Daesang)	Lee Hyori	Won	
Seoul Music Awards	2003	Grand Prize (Daesang)	Lee Hyori	Won	
Seoul Music Awards	2003	Main Prize (Bonsang)	Lee Hyori	Won	
Seoul Arts & Culture Award	2010	Best Pop Artist	Lee Hyori	Won	
Ulsan MBC Entertainment Awards	2003	Best Female Singer	Lee Hyori	Won	
Ulsan MBC Entertainment Awards	2003	Female Best Dresser	Lee Hyori	Won	

== Other accolades ==
=== State and cultural honors ===
Name of country or organization, year given, and name of honor or award
Country or organization	Year	Honor/Award	Ref.
Korea Green Foundation	2011	People Who Made the World Brighter Award	

=== Listicles ===
Name of publisher, year listed, name of listicle, and placement
Publisher	Year	List	Ranking	Ref.
Forbes	2009	Korea Power Celebrity 40	4th	
Forbes	2010	Korea Power Celebrity 40	8th	
Forbes	2011	Korea Power Celebrity 40	11th	
Forbes	2012	Korea Power Celebrity 40	36th	
Forbes	2018	Korea Power Celebrity 40	20th	
Forbes	2021	Korea Power Celebrity 40	33rd	
Golden Disc Awards	2025	Golden Disc Powerhouse 40	Placed	
IZM	2025	The 25 Greatest Musicians of the first 25 Years of the 21st Century	Placed	
Mnet	2013	Legend 100 Artists	42nd	
