= U-Go-Girl =

Single by Lee Hyori

from the album It's Hyorish
- Language: Korean
- Released: July 12, 2008
- Recorded: 2008
- Genre: Dance-pop
- Length: 3:09
- Label: Mnet Media
- Songwriter: E-Tribe
- Producer: E-Tribe

Lee Hyori singles chronology
"Cat on the Roof" (2008)	"U-Go-Girl" (2008)	"Hey Mr. Big" (2008)

Music video
- "U-Go-Girl" on YouTube

"U-Go-Girl" is a song by South Korean recording artist Lee Hyori, featuring rapper Nassun. It was first made available to digital outlets in South Korea a three days prior to the release of her third studio album, It's Hyorish, on July 12, 2008. A dance-pop number with hip hop influences, "U-Go-Girl" was written and produced by songwriting duo E-Tribe, who would later compose Girls' Generation's "Gee" (2009) and Miss A's "Hush" (2013). "U-Go-Girl" was made available via Mnet.com along with the second title track "Hey, Mr. Big" as one of the pre-releases.

== Background ==
Lee's third studio album along with its two title tracks were unveiled on July 9, 2008, and was originally intended to be released a week later on July 16. The album marked Lee's first album since Dark Angel in 2006. Mnet Media initially planned to pre-release five of the upcoming album's songs, including "U-Go-Girl" and "Hey, Mr. Big", on July 14. After several of the album's songs were illegally leaked to YouTube, however, Mnet Media pushed up the release of "U-Go-Girl" to July 12, 2008. The full album was released a day earlier than intended, on July 15.

== Composition and promotion ==
"U-Go-Girl" is a hip-hop dance number with its lyrical content directed towards her female fans, featuring lyrics that loosely translate to "don't be shy, show yourself boldly". Lee appeared and promoted the single on several South Korean music programs, including Music Bank, Show! Music Core, and Inkigayo. In December 2008, Lee performed the song at her first solo concert titled Lee Hyori the Invincible at the Jamsil Indoor Stadium.

== Accolades ==
Awards and nominations for "U-Go-Girl"
Year	Award-giving body	Category	Result	Ref.
2008	Mnet KM Music Festival	Best Female Artist	Won	
2008	Mnet KM Music Festival	Best Dance Performance	Won	
2008	Mnet KM Music Festival	Song of the Year	Nominated	

Music program awards
Program	Date	Ref.
Inkigayo	July 27, 2008	
Inkigayo	August 3, 2008	
Inkigayo	August 10, 2008	
M Countdown	July 31, 2008	
M Countdown	August 14, 2008	
M Countdown	August 21, 2008	
Music Bank	August 1, 2008	
Music Bank	August 8, 2008	
Music Bank	August 15, 2008	

== Music video ==
The music video for "U-Go-Girl" was shot during the first week of July 2008. An official from Mnet said that the video's concept would be "fit for the summer mood." Upon the video's release, however, it was met with controversy as Lee, who wore a nurse outfit in the video, was accused of representing nurses as a sexual object. Several scenes in the video was also criticized for resembling Christina Aguilera's work. The music video was soon re-uploaded and the controversial scenes were deleted.

== Covers ==
The song has been covered various times by other K-pop artists. Girls' Generation covered "U-Go-Girl" on the 200th episode special of Show Music Core on February 20, 2010. In 2015, the song was performed by Nayeon, Chaeryeong, Mina, and Jeongyeon during the girl group survival show Sixteen; while the show's final lineup, who formed the girl group Twice, performed the same song at the 2016 MBC Korean Music Festival on December 31, 2016. Seventeen also performed a cover of the song at the 2016 SBS Gayo Daejeon, while (G)I-dle covered it on a Show! Music Core special stage on August 11, 2018. Everglow performed a cover of the song for CON:nected Live in 2020, while Itzy's Yuna performed the song at the 2022 KBS Song Festival on December 16.
