= It's Hyorish =

Studio album by Lee Hyori
- Released: July 15, 2008
- Recorded: 2008
- Studio: BL Studio; Good Studio; Momo Studio; Studio192; Sponge Studio
- Genre: K-pop
- Length: 45:45
- Language: Korean
- Label: Mnet Media

Lee Hyori chronology
Dark Angel (2006)	It's Hyorish (2008)	H-Logic (2010)

Singles from It's Hyorish
- 1. "U-Go-Girl" Released: July 12, 2008; 2. "Hey Mr. Big" Released: July 12, 2008

It's Hyorish is the third studio album by South Korean recording artist Lee Hyori, released by Mnet Media on July 15, 2008. The album contains 13 tracks, including the singles "U-Go-Girl" and "Hey Mr. Big". It explores a variety of musical styles–including hip-hop, eurodance, and electronica, with songwriting contributions by Kim Eana, Wheesung, and E-Tribe, amongst others.

The album was a commercial success in South Korea, it received over 60,000 pre-orders ten days before the official release. It achieved the number one position on the monthly MIAK album chart for the month of July, making it her first number-one album. It was the country's best-selling album of 2008 by a female solo artist, and has since sold over 100,000 copies.

== Background and release ==
On July 9, 2008, the name of Lee's then-upcoming third studio album along with its two title tracks were unveiled, slated for release on July 16. The album marked Lee's first album in 2 years and 5 months, since February 2006's Dark Angel. The album was produced in two physical formats: a regular CD version and a limited edition LP version. The limited edition's album jacket was printed in the size of an LP record while the CD itself was arranged in a way that hid behind the LP. It additionally contained a photobook with more than 60 photos taken in Hawaii. The limited edition of the album received more than 60,000 pre-orders; however, only 10,000 copies were made available to distributors.

Mnet initially planned to pre-release five of the upcoming album's songs, including the two title tracks, on July 14. However, some of the album's tracks were illegally leaked to YouTube, and so the pre-releases were instead released two days earlier, on July 12. The full album was released a day earlier than intended, on July 15.

== Singles and promotion ==
"U-Go-Girl" was released as the primary single from album; it was made available via Mnet.com along with the second title track as one of the pre-releases. The song is a hip-hop dance number with its lyrical content directed towards her female fans, featuring lyrics that loosely translate to "don't be shy, show yourself boldly". Lee promoted the song with televised live performances on several South Korean music programs, including Music Bank, Show! Music Core, and Inkigayo.

Its accompanying music video was filmed in Namyangju during the first week of July. An official from Mnet said that the video's concept would be "fit for the summer mood." Upon the video's release, however, it was met with controversy as Lee, who wore a nurse outfit in the video, was accused of representing nurses as a sexual object. Several scenes in the video was also criticized for resembling Christina Aguilera's work. The music video was soon re-uploaded and the controversial scenes were deleted.

"Hey Mr. Big" is the second single from the album. It is a dance number that infuses eurodance rhythms into a electronica sound. Promotions for the song began in late-August as a follow-up to "U-Go-Girl". In contrast to the cheerful charm of the first single, "Hey Mr. Big" was described as a song that radiates sexy, lively, provocative, and sensual charms.

== Critical reception ==
Reviewing for webzine IZM, Lee Dae-hwa wrote that the album saw an improvement in musicality compared to Dark Angel, and said that a more sincere and candid story about Lee unraveled through several songs, particularly through "Lee Hyori the Invincible", "A Barbershop Daughter" and "Don't Cry". However, he criticized her vocals in the track "Unusual" and the rap part in the latter half of "U-Go-Girl". In a panel of 35 music critics organized by Seoul Shinmun and Melon, the single "U-Go-Girl" was ranked at number 41 in their list of top 100 best K-pop songs of all-time. Music critic Seong Hyo-sun praised the song's composition and empowering theme, as well as Lee's positioning as the narrator of the song rather than an object to be seen by someone else.

=== Accolades ===
"U-Go-Girl" won nine first place music program awards in South Korea, making it her most awarded single. "Hey Mr. Big" additionally won two music program awards on Inkigayo, ranking first on September 28 and October 5, 2008. At the 2008 Mnet KM Music Festival, "U-Go-Girl" won Best Dance Performance and led Lee to win Best Female Artist.

== Commercial performance ==
Commercially, It's Hyorish experienced success domestically. It received more than 60,000 pre-orders ten days before the album's release. In the month of July 2008, the album ranked number one on the monthly MIAK album chart, selling 45,267 copies. It marked her first number-one album of her career and second overall; her physical single "Toc Toc Toc" previously topped the chart in March 2007. In the final MIAK chart issue released in September 2008, it was reported that the album had sold 62,863 copies in the country. It was the best-selling album among all female solo singers that year, selling 100,000 copies by 2010.

== Concert ==
=== The First Concert: Lee Hyori the Invincible ===
To commemorate the 10th anniversary of her debut, Lee Hyori held her first solo concert titled "The First Concert: Lee Hyori the Invincible" (Korean: 천하무적 이효리). The concert was held in support of the album at the Jamsil Indoor Stadium in Seoul. Only one performance was initially planned, however, all seats for the first show were sold out within days. With more than a month left, one additional show was added due to popular demand. At the concert, T-shirts designed by Lee herself were given to each member of the audience. During the performance of "U-Go-Girl", Nassun and several male backup dancers threw polaroid photos of Lee Hyori into the crowd.

Date	City	Country	Venue	Attendance
December 19, 2008	Seoul	South Korea	Jamsil Indoor Stadium	8,000
December 20, 2008	Seoul	South Korea	Jamsil Indoor Stadium	—

== Track listing ==
CD/Digital download
No.	Title	Lyrics	Music	Length
1.	"Lee Hyori the Invincible" (천하무적 이효리; Cheonhamujeok Ihyori)	Kim Eana	Kim Do-hyun	3:30
2.	"Lesson"	Cha Eun-taek, Wheesung	Park Geun-tae	3:34
3.	"U-Go-Girl" (featuring Nassun)	E-Tribe	E-Tribe	3:09
4.	"Photo Album" (사진첩; Sajincheop)	Bak Chang-hyun, Annie. K	Kim Do-hyun	3:59
5.	"A Barbershop's Daughter" (이발소 집 딸; Ibalso Jip Ttal)	Lee Hyori	YC-Shandi K	3:17
6.	"Don't Cry"	Lee Hyori	KZ1, KZ2	4:03
7.	"Do You Think It'll Be Okay?" (괜찮아질까요?; Gwaenchanajilkkayo?, featuring Bigtone)	Lee Hyori, Bigtone	Kim Do-hyun	3:53
8.	"Sexy Boy" (featuring Wheesung)	Wheesung	YC-Subzero	3:07
9.	"Red Car" (빨간 자동차; Bbalgan Jadongcha, featuring Kim Gun-mo)	Ahn Yeong-min	YC-Subzero	3:02
10.	"Hey Mr. Big"	Wheesung	Park Geun-tae	3:12
11.	"P.P.P (Punky Punky Party)" (featuring Nassun)	E-Tribe	E-Tribe	3:59
12.	"My Life" (Foreign song)	MayBee	Kim Do-hyun	3:46
13.	"Unusual" (featuring Seo Jung-hwan)	Yoon Sa-ra, Seo Jung-hwan	Mad Soul Child	3:14
Total length:				45:45

== Charts ==
=== Monthly charts ===
Chart (2008)	Peak position
South Korean Albums (RIAK)	1

== Sales ==
Region	Certification	Certified units/sales
South Korea	—	100,000
