= Dark Angel (Lee Hyori album) =

Studio album by Lee Hyori
- Released: February 9, 2006
- Recorded: 2005–2006
- Genre: Dance-pop; R&B
- Length: 46:41
- Language: Korean
- Label: DSP; Mnet Media

Lee Hyori chronology
Stylish (2003)	Dark Angel (2006)	It's Hyorish (2008)

Singles from Dark Angel
- 1. "Get Ya'" Released: February 9, 2006; 2. "Shall We Dance?" Released: February 9, 2006; 3. "Straight Up" Released: February 9, 2006; 4. "Dark Angel" Released: February 9, 2006

Dark Angel is the second studio album by South Korean singer Lee Hyori. It was released on February 9, 2006. The album features singles "Get Ya'", "Shall We Dance?", and a cover of the Chanté Moore single, "Straight Up". It is notable for the plagiarism controversy regarding her first single, "Get Ya'", which was accused of copying Britney Spears's single "Do Somethin'" (2005).

== Plagiarism accusations ==
The first single from her album, "Get Ya'" was accused of plagiarizing Britney Spears's "Do Somethin'," as proposed by the composer of the American pop star's song. After the news started to spread, Lee and her record company announced that promotion of the single would be quickly halted, and that she would have a short break from activities in order to promote her follow-up singles "Shall We Dance?" and "Dark Angel". This was the last single of the album to be promoted by Lee, although "Straight Up" was released as the next single from the album.

== Critical reception ==
Professional ratings
Review scores
Source	Rating
IZM	(negative)

Lee Dae-hwa of music webzine IZM gave the album a negative review. Coupled with its plagiarism allegations, Lee criticized the album's composition and cohesiveness.

== Accolades ==
Music program awards for "Get Ya'"
Program	Date
Inkigayo	March 12, 2006
Inkigayo	March 19, 2006
M Countdown	March 16, 2006

== Track listing ==
No.	Title	Lyrics	Music	Length
1.	"Get Ya'"	MayBee	Kim Do-hyun	3:34
2.	"Depth" (깊이; Gipi)	Yoon Sa-ra	Mad Soul Child	3:15
3.	"Straight Up"	MayBee	Cynthia Loving, Jermaine Dupri, Bryan Cox	3:35
4.	"Dark Angel"	MayBee	Kim Do-hyun	3:51
5.	"Dear Boy"	Han Sang-won, Lee Dong-su	Han Sang-won	3:25
6.	"Winter Gaze" (겨울 시선; Gyeowul Shiseon)	Yoon Kyeong	Lee Byeong-jun	3:26
7.	"Closer"	Lee Hyori	DMA	3:28
8.	"Stealing a Glance [M.A.R.S. Remix]" (훔쳐보기; Humchyeobogi)	Lazy	Shin In-su	4:26
9.	"Shall We Dance?"	MayBee	Kim Do-hyun	3:02
10.	"Slave" (노예; Noye)	E-Tribe	E-Tribe	2:53
11.	"E.M.M.M (Eenie, Meenie, Minie, Moe)"	Lee Hyori	Ignite	3:38
12.	"2 Faces"	Lee Byeong-jun	Lee Byeong-jun	3:36
13.	"Last Goodbye" (마지막 인사; Majimak Insa)	Yoon Yeong-jun	Yoon Yeong-jun	4:32
Total length:				46:41

== Sales ==
Region	Sales amount
South Korea	100,000
