= Jeon Ji-yoon =

South Korean singer (born 1990)

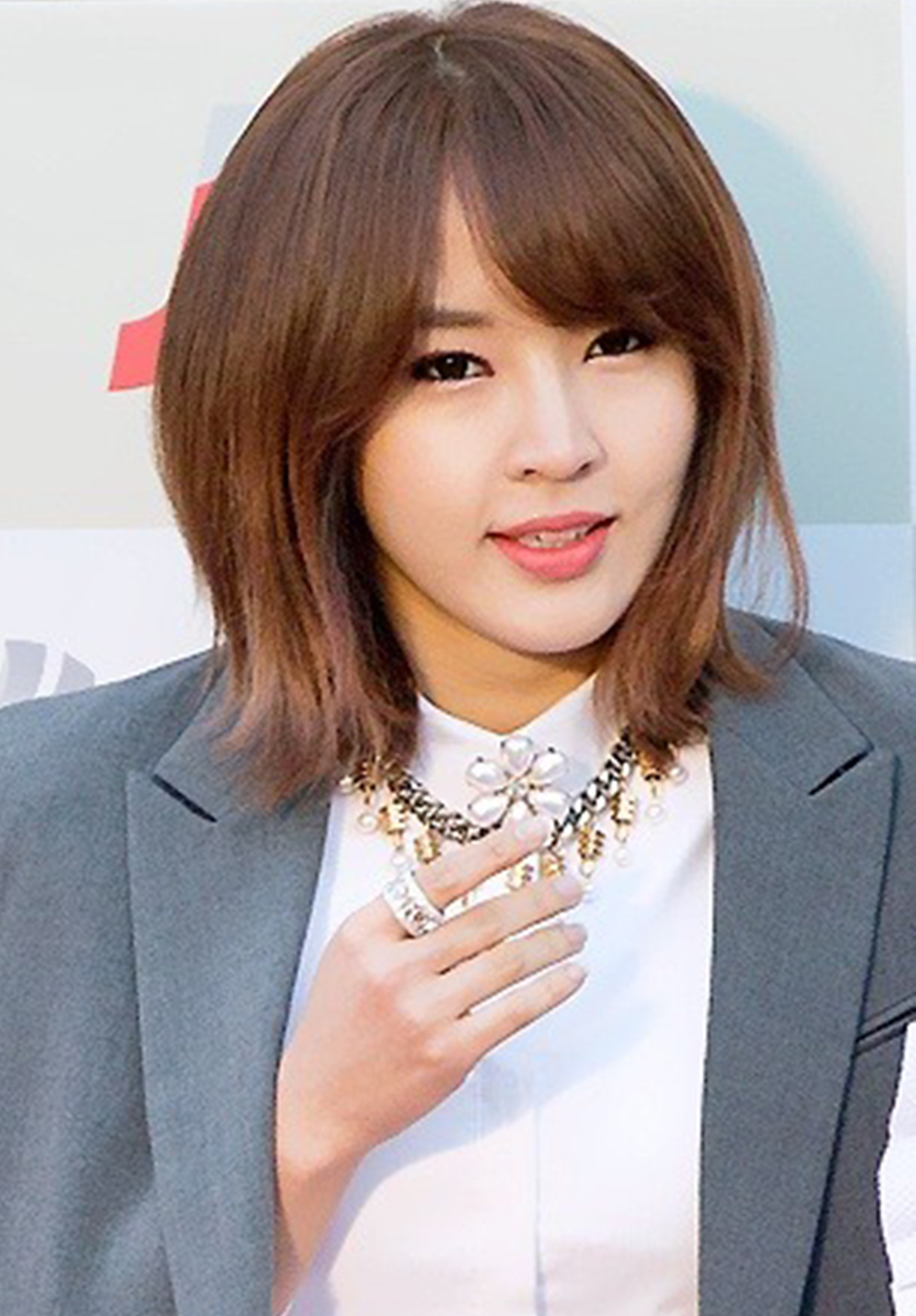
- Jeon at the 2014 Gaon Chart K-pop Awards
- Born: Jeon Ji-yoon; October 15, 1990 (age 36); Suwon, South Korea
- Other name: Jenyer
- Education: Kyung Hee University
- Occupations: Singer; rapper; songwriter
- Musical career
- Genre: K-pop
- Instrument: Vocals
- Years active: 2009–present
- Labels: Cube; JS E&M; Jenyer Production; Artsro
- Member of: Prsnt
- Formerly of: 4Minute; 2Yoon; United Cube

Korean name
- Hangul: 전지윤
- Hanja: 田祉潤
- RR: Jeon Jiyun
- MR: Chŏn Chiyun

Jeon Ji-yoon (Korean: 전지윤; born October 15, 1990), professionally known as Jiyoon or Jenyer, is a South Korean singer, rapper, and songwriter known for her work as a former member of South Korean girl group 4Minute. She debuted as a solo artist on November 2, 2016, under the stage name Jenyer, with the release of her debut digital single, "I Do".

== Early life ==
Jeon Ji-yoon was born on October 15, 1990 in Suwon, South Korea. She graduated from Byeongjeom High School and is currently attending Kyung Hee University, majoring in Post Modern Music.

== Career ==
=== 2009–2012: 4Minute and solo activities ===
Jiyoon was chosen as a member of 4Minute in 2009. The five-member girl group officially debuted on June 18, 2009 with their debut single "Hot Issue" on M! Countdown. On October 15, 2009, she was a featured artist in Woo Yi-kyung's album Look at Me with the song "Look at Me". On April 13, 2010, she was a featured artist in Lee Hyo-ri's fourth album H-Logic with the song "Bring It Back" together with After School's Bekah. She sang in the soundtrack of MBC's My Princess, with the song "Oasis", released on February 7, 2011. She was also featured in Hyuna's album Bubble Pop! in the song "Downtown". The album was released on July 5, 2011.

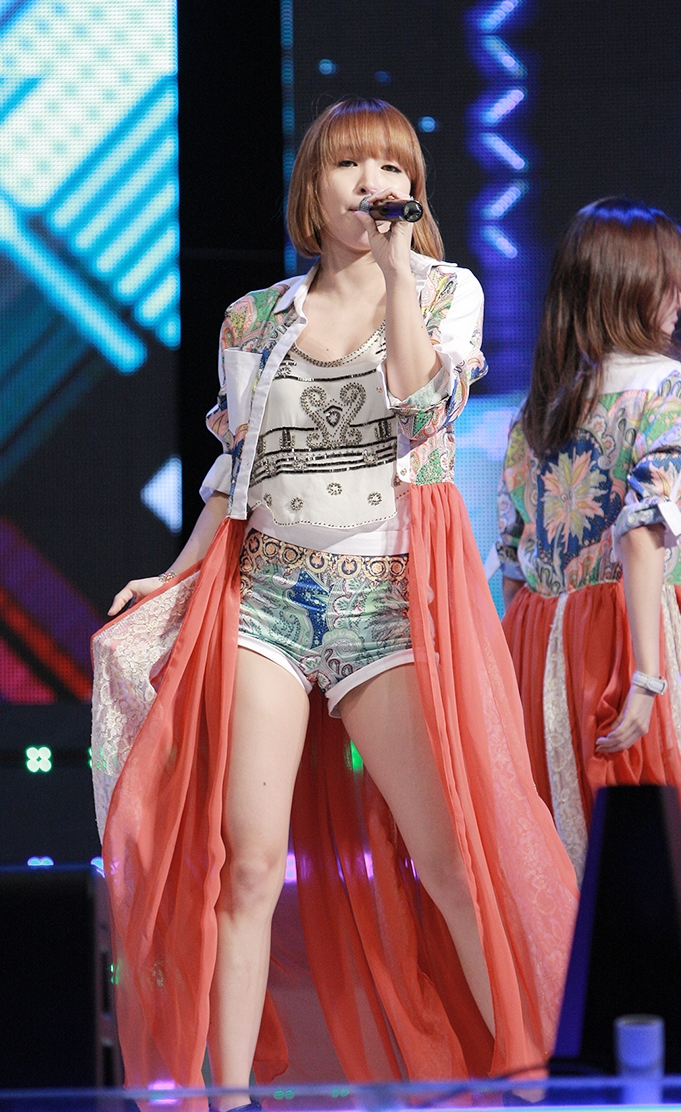
Jeon performing at Paju in 2012

Ji-yoon joined KBS's Immortal Songs 2 in June 2011 as a replacement of Song Ji Eun of Secret due to their Japanese promotions. "I felt that her vocals were more charming than [4Minute's] main vocalist Gayoon," the producer of the show said. On the show, professionals sing competitively and are judged by a studio audience of 200. She sang "We Meet Again" in an episode broadcast on July 15. And joining on KBS's Immortal Songs 2, she won together with DJ Koo with the song "I (Nan)" originally by Clon against Super Junior's Kyuhyun and Son Ho-young.

=== 2013–2016: 2Yoon and 4Minute's disbandment ===
Jiyoon and her bandmate Gayoon had formed a subgroup called 2Yoon in 2013. They released their debut EP "Harvest Moon" with lead single "24/7" on 17 January 2013. The sub-group officially debuted on January 17 on M Countdown. In September 2014, it was revealed that Ji-yoon will making her acting debut with the web drama Dreaming CEO.

On September 24, 2015, it was revealed that Jiyoon will join Unpretty Rapstar Season 2. During Unpretty Rapstar, Jiyoon released a solo song featuring Jung Il-hoon called "This Ain't Me" during the semifinals. On 13 June 2016, Cube Entertainment announced that 4Minute decided to disband and the members, excluding HyunA, were still in discussion on whether they will renew their contracts. On 15 June 2016, Cube Entertainment official announced that Jihyun, Gayoon, Jiyoon and Sohyun's contracts had expired and they decided not to renew their contracts.

=== 2016–present: Label change and Day and Night ===
On August 8, 2016, Jiyoon has signed an exclusive contract with JS E&M, which also houses artists such as actors Seo Ha-joon, Byun Jung-soo, Yang Mi-ra and Chun Jung-myung, as well as South Korean girl group Tren-D. The agency announced her solo debut plans and actively support her from music to acting and also on variety shows, citing her as having "unlimited potential". On August 31, 2016, Jiyoon is reported hard at work preparing for a digital single album release in October. Despite being a singer, her new agency confirmed she will also be active in upcoming dramas and broadcasts.

Jiyoon debuted as a solo artist on November 2, 2016 by the stage name "Jenyer", with the single album Day and Night. The title song "I Do" and its music video were released on the same day. Jiyoon didn't promote her new single on music shows. On March 23, 2017, she released the collaboration single "Cliché" with Samuel Seo. The accompanying music video was released the same day. On April 10, 2017, Jiyoon showed support and attended the movie premiere for "Daddy You, Daughter Me" in which Heo Gayoon, the former groupmate of Jiyoon, made her acting debut. Since 2019, she's also the vocalist of the band Prsnt with DJ Allzwell and producer mOnSteR nO.9.

== Discography ==
=== Extended plays ===
Title	Album details
The Moment I Loved	Released: May 4, 2019; Label: Jenyer Production; Format: Digital download; Track listing: 1. "Illusion" (환상); 2. "Analog"; 3. "Because I Can Not Decide" (그건 내가 정할 수가 없는 거라서); 4. "Like the First Time" (처음처럼) (Bonus Track)

=== Single albums ===
Title	Album details
Day and Night (낮 and 밤)	Released: November 2, 2016; Label: JS E&M, LOEN Entertainment; Format: Digital download; Track listing: 1. "I Do" (내가 해); 2. "Magnet" (자석) (feat. Olltii)
Bad	Released: August 24, 2020; Label: Artsro Entertainment, Kakao M; Format: Digital download; Track listing: 1. "To This Which the World All Are Bad" (세상 모든 나쁜 이들에게); 2. "Bad" (feat. KIMMUSEUM)

=== Singles ===
Title	Year	Album
"Soulmate" (소울메이트) (with DickPunks)	2014	Non-album singles
"I Do"	2016	Day and Night
"Cliché" (with Samuel Seo)	2017	Non-album singles
"Hello" (저기요) (featuring Kisum)	2017	Non-album singles
"Because"	2018	Non-album singles
"Bus"	2018	Non-album singles
"Shower" (샤워)	2018	Non-album singles
"Illusion"	2019	The Moment I Loved
"Bad" (featuring KIMMUSEUM)	2020	Bad
"Soop" (featuring Gayoon)	2021	Non-album singles

=== Soundtrack appearances ===
Year	Title	Song	Notes
2011	MBC My Princess OST	"Oasis" (오아시스)	—N/a
2012	My Love By My Side OST	"Between Love and Friendship" (사랑과 우정사이)	original song by Pinocchio (피노키오)
2013	Love For Ten - Generation of Youth OST	"Only You"	with Son Ji-hyun
2015	Unpretty Rapstar 2	"This Ain't Me" (바꾸지 마)	with Jung Il-hoon
2017	The Guardians OST	"AMEN"	with Damiano
2017	The Guardians OST	"Taken"	with DAVII
2017	King of Mask Singer OST Part. 131	"Beautiful Goodbye" (아름다운 이별)	with Kim Won-joo (4Men), original song by Kim Gun-mo
2020	Hanging On! OST	"Don't lose your mind" (놓지마 정신줄)	—N/a

=== Other appearances ===
Year	Album	Song	Notes
2009	Look at Me	"Look at Me" (나만 봐)	Woo Yi-kyung feat. Jiyoon
2010	H-Logic	"Bring It Back"	Lee Hyo-ri feat. Jiyoon & Bekah
2011	Bubble Pop!	"Downtown"	HyunA feat. Jiyoon
2012	Solbi Is An Ottogi (솔비는 오뚜기)	"Ottogi" (오뚜기)	Sol B feat. Jiyoon
2014	4Minute World	"I'll Tell You" (알려 줄게)	with Jihyun & Sohyun
2014	SBS Hallyu Dream Concert 2014	"Moonlight Silla (Rock Ver.)"	with Heo Young-ji, Song Ji-eun, DickPunks and Park So-yeon

== Filmography ==
=== Film ===
Year	Title	Role	Notes
2015	A Time to Leave	Yoon-so	Lead role

=== Television series ===
Year	Title	Role	Notes
2014	Dreaming CEO	Kkoom Yi	Lead role

=== Television shows ===
Year	Title	Role
2011	Immortal Songs 2	Contestant
2015	Unpretty Rapstar 2	Contestant
2017	King of Mask Singer	Contestant

=== Musical theatre ===
Year	Title	Role
2012–2013	My Love by My Side	Bok-hee
