= H-Logic =

Studio album by Lee Hyori
- Released: April 12, 2010
- Recorded: 2009–2010
- Genre: K-pop; hip hop
- Length: 50:06
- Language: Korean
- Label: Mnet Media; B2M

Lee Hyori chronology
It's Hyorish (2008)	H-Logic (2010)	Monochrome (2013)

Singles from H-Logic
- 1. "Swing" Released: April 1, 2010; 2. "Chitty Chitty Bang Bang" Released: April 8, 2010

H-Logic is the fourth studio album by South Korean singer Lee Hyori. It was released on April 12, 2010. The album has 14 tracks, including collaborations with Daesung from Big Bang, Jiyoon from 4Minute, Bekah from After School, Gary from Leessang, and Sangchu from Mighty Mouth. The singer worked also with E-Tribe, the team behind "U-Go-Girl", the lead single from her previous album.

The album sold 31,756 copies in 2010, making it the 46th best-selling Korean album in 2010. The promotions ended after the outputs of the two singles "Bring It Back" and "How Did We Get". Following the album’s release, seven tracks from the album were revealed to be plagiarized by Bahnus. After the controversy, Lee took a temporary hiatus until 2013.

== Release ==
Lee’s comeback made their return with their fourth studio album, the titled album was called H-Logic which would be shortly released on April 12, 2010, the album’s showcase would be in it.

== Singles ==
Lee performed "Swing" in the music video as their first single with Gary of Leessang. The music video for the second single "Chitty Chitty Bang Bang" was released on April 7, 2011.

== Accolades ==
"Chitty Chitty Bang Bang" received a nomination for Best Dance Performance – Solo at the 2010 Mnet Asian Music Awards, but lost to Rain's "Love Song".

Music program awards for "Chitty Chitty Bang Bang"
Program	Date	Ref.
M Countdown	April 22, 2010	
Inkigayo	April 25, 2010	
Inkigayo	May 2, 2010	
Inkigayo	May 9, 2010	

== Plagiarism ==
Seven of the songs in the album, which were produced by Bahnus, were plagiarized.

== Track listing ==
CD/Digital download
No.	Title	Lyrics	Music	Length
1.	"I'm Back"	Ceejay, Killme	(Note: Found to be plagiarized by Bahnus. The original song was called So Insane by Lil Precious.)	3:41
2.	"Love Sign" (featuring Sangchu of Mighty Mouth)		Jamie Norris, Nick Scapa	3:27
3.	"Chitty Chitty Bang Bang" (featuring Ceejay of Freshboyz)	Lee Hyori	Ryan Jhun, Antwann Frost, Ronald Frost, Anitral Terrell, Denzil "iDR" Remedios, Kim Ji-woong, Kibwe Luke	3:24
4.	"Feel the Same"	Han Ji-seon	Jeong Ho-hyeon (Note: The song was found to be plagiarized by composer Bahnus. The original song was Feel the same by Melanie Durrant.)	2:58
5.	"Bring It Back" (featuring Bekah of After School, and Jeon Ji-yoon of 4Minute)	Dr.fe	(Note: The song was found to be plagiarized by Bahnus. The original song was called Boy, Bring it Back by Cookie Coture.)	3:14
6.	"Highlight" (featuring Bizzy)	Tae-moo	(Note: The song was found to be plagiarized by Bahnus.It is unclear however what song was plagiarized.)	3:39
7.	"Swing" (그네; Geune, featuring Gary of Leessang)	Gary	(Note: Found to be plagiarized by Bahnus. The original song was a greek song called "To treno fevgi stis okto" composed by Mikis Theodorakis.)	4:20
8.	"Scandal"	Kim Ji-hyang	Ryan Jhun, Sharif "Reefa" Slater	3:28
9.	"100 Percent"	Brian Kim	Ryan Jhun, Antwann Frost, Ronald Frost, Brande Kelley	3:39
10.	"Want Me Back"	Lee Dong-eun	Ryan Jhun, Antwann Frost, Ronald Frost, Lauren Seymour	3:23
11.	"How Did We Get" (featuring Daesung of Big Bang)	Lee Sol-i	Jeong Ho-hyeon (Note: The music was found to be plagiarized by Bahnus. The original song was called How did we by Jason Derulo.)	3:46
12.	"So Cold"	Killme	Sasha Payne	3:24
13.	"Get 2 Know" (featuring Double K)		Jean T. Na	4:19
14.	"Memory" (featuring Bizzy)	Bak Hae-in	(Note: The music wad found to be plagiarized by Bahnus. The original song was called Alphabet Song by Second Person.)	3:24
Total length:				50:06

== Charts ==
=== Weekly charts ===
Chart (2010)	Peak position
South Korean Albums (Circle)	15

=== Monthly charts ===
Chart (2010)	Peak position
South Korean Albums (Circle)	34

=== Year-end charts ===
Chart (2010)	Position
South Korean Albums (Gaon)	46

== Release history ==
Region	Date	Format(s)	Label
South Korea	April 8, 2010	CD, digital download, streaming	B2M Entertainment
Worldwide	April 12, 2010	Digital download	B2M Entertainment
