= Stylish... =

Studio album by Lee Hyori
- Released: August 13, 2003
- Recorded: 2003
- Studio: Booming Studio; T Studio; Sam Studio; A Studio; Meca Studio; BT Sound Studio
- Genre: Pop; R&B
- Length: 54:51
- Language: Korean
- Label: DSP; CJ E&M

Lee Hyori chronology
Stylish... (2003)	Dark Angel (2006)

Singles from Stylish
- 1. "10 Minutes" Released: August 13, 2003; 2. "Hey Girl" Released: August 13, 2003; 3. "Remember Me" Released: August 13, 2003

Stylish... is the debut solo studio album by South Korean recording artist Lee Hyori. It marked her solo debut since becoming a member of girl group Fin.K.L in 1998. The album was released through DSP Media on August 13, 2003, and was distributed by CJ E&M Music. It is primarily a pop and R&B record containing influences from hip-hop, featuring songwriting contributions from various musicians including Rhymer, MayBee, Won Tae-yeon, Yoon Il-sang, and Lee Hyun-do of Deux.

Upon release, the album saw commercial success and catapulted Lee to superstar status in the country; papers even dubbed her popularity the "Hyori Syndrome". "10 Minutes" won various prominent awards at domestic award shows, including the Grand Prize (daesang) at both the KBS Music Awards and SBS Gayo Daejeon, as well as the Most Popular Music Video at the Mnet Music Video Festival. By 2006, the album had sold over 170,000 copies.

Stylish... featured "10 Minutes", "Hey Girl", and "Remember Me" as its singles, each with its own music video. Rolling Stone characterized the "10 Minutes" video as a choreography-filled visual that "showcased the country to Western pop's trends". Lee appeared and performed on various South Korean music programs to promote the album, including Music Camp and Inkigayo, with "10 Minutes" ranking at number one on the charts of these programs for several weeks.

== Background ==
Lee became well known in South Korea as a member of girl group Fin.K.L, who made their debut under DSP Media in May 1998 with the album Blue Rain. However, the group's activities began to slow down following the release of their fourth studio album Forever in March 2002. The members of Fin.K.L began exploring individual activities beginning in 2003, thus putting group activities in a temporary hiatus. Lee embarked solo career with the release of her debut studio album Stylish... on August 13, 2003, spawning the lead single "10 Minutes".

== Singles ==
The first lead track, "10 Minutes", is a R&B and hip hop number. It was composed by Kim Do-hyun who also composed "That's Right" from Shinhwa's 11th album The Classic in 2013. The song's lyrics were penned by MayBee, with the lyrical content conveying how Lee can seduce a man in only ten minutes. The lyrics were originally for a song by hip hop group People Crew, but were instead given to Lee Hyori. Upon its release, the music video was banned by SBS from public broadcast due to its "erotic" choreography.

"Hey Girl" featuring Rhymer was the follow-up single; the video was banned on some networks due to its sexual imagery, although Lee said that it was the same as her first video and therefore she did not see why this had to be banned. The single was not performed as frequently as the first one, and promotions for the album were completed soon after. Originally, "Eve, Sleeping in Paradise" was intended to serve as the second single for the album. A music video for the third single, "Remember Me", was also released.

== Reception ==
In 2021, "10 Minutes" was ranked the 16th best K-pop song of all-time by Melon and Seoul Shinmun. Rolling Stone ranked the single "10 Minutes" number 24 in their list of the 100 greatest Korean pop songs all time, remarking how she became "an inescapable presence in Korea around the release of her solo debut." The publication compared the song to the music of Aaliyah and Jennifer Lopez, describing it as a "groovy, synth-fueled R&B-pop perfection" and a "change from the cutesy music she performed with Fin.K.L". The music video for "10 Minutes" won the Most Popular Music Video (daesang) at the 2003 Mnet Music Video Festival.

Commercially, the album was reportedly in such high demand that 70,000 copies were pre-ordered. The album's success allowed Lee to become the highest-paid female artist in South Korea at the time. It debuted at number three on the RIAK monthly chart for August 2003, selling 79,361 copies in the first month of its release. It sold 144,182 copies by the end of 2003, making it the 15th best-selling record of the year in South Korea. It sold an additional 9,408 copies in 2004 according to the RIAK charts. At the 18th Golden Disc Awards, the record was one of the Album Bonsang (main prize) winners and was nominated for the Album Daesang (grand prize). It has old over 170,000 copies in 2006.

== Track listing ==
Track listing for Stylish...
No.	Title	Lyrics	Music	Length
1.	"Prologue (Drum & Bass)"	Lee Hyori	Lee Hyori	1:48
2.	"One Two Three N'Four"	Kim Yeong-a	Kim Do-hyun	3:56
3.	"Like a Fool (Sadness)" (바보처럼; Babocheoreom)	Hong Ji-yoo	John K	3:54
4.	"10 Minutes"	MayBee	Kim Do-hyun	3:54
5.	"Ice" (얼음; Eoleum)	Won Tae-yeon	Yoon Il-sang	3:40
6.	"Eve, Sleeping in Paradise" (이브, 낙원에 잠들다; Ibeu, Nakwone Jamdeulda)	Kim Yeong-a	The Jun	3:50
7.	"Remember Me"	MayBee	Kim Geon-woo	3:59
8.	"Like Today" (오늘따라; Oneulttara)	Jo Gyu-man	Jo Gyu-man	4:42
9.	"Do Me"	Lee Hyun-do	Lee Hyun-do	3:45
10.	"Hey Girl"	Lee Hyori feat. Rhymer	Kim Do-hyun	3:59
11.	"Erase" (지워 버려; Jiwo Beoryeo)	Kim Ji-woong	Kim Ji-woong	4:07
12.	"A Jazz Bar" (어느 재즈바; Eneu Jaejeuba)	Han Jin-woo	Ahn Jeong-hoon	4:11
13.	"Only One"	Lee Hyori	Ryu Hyeong-seop	3:51
14.	"I'm Sorry (Ghost)" (미안해요; Mianhaeyo)	Lee Hyori	Ahn Jeong-hoon	5:15
Total length:				54:51

== Credits and personnel ==
Credits adapted from album liner notes

Musicians

- Lee Hyori – vocals, chorus
- Yoon Il-sang – acoustic/electronic piano, chorus
- Jo Gyu-man – acoustic/electronic piano, chorus
- John+K – acoustic/electronic piano
- Mad SoulChild – acoustic/electronic piano
- Kim Ji-woong – acoustic/electronic piano
- Lee Geun-hyung – acoustic guitar, electric guitar
- Hong Jun-ho – acoustic guitar, electric guitar
- Ryu Hyeong-seop – acoustic guitar, electric guitar
- Ahn Jung-hoon – acoustic guitar, electric guitar, harmonica
- Huh Jae-hyuk – bass guitar
- Lee Seon-ah and seven others (Note: Kang Seon-ju, Park Mi-hyun, Lee Jung-hyun, Kim In-seon, Kim Ji-sook, Lee Ji-yeon, Jo Hyun) – first violin
- Lee Jang-woo and seven others (Note: Son Tae-hee, Seon Woo-hyun, Kim Min-jung, Yoon Hyun-ji, Cha Hyun-ah, Lee Hyun-young, Kim Hye-jin) – second violin
- Ahn Ji-woo, Kim Hye-sun, Park Geun-suk, Oh Hye-min, Ha Ji-hyun – viola
- Hong Mi-jeong, Um Jeong-hee, Ko Hyeon-jeong – cello
- Kim Da-young, Kim Hyuna, Lee Ji-eun, Soul-trip, Kim Hyo-su – chorus
- Choi Jae-hwa (DJ Rex) – scratch

Production and design

- Lee Hyori – production
- Ahn Jung-hoon – production
- Lee Ho-yeon (DSP Entertainment) – executive producer
- Kim Do-hyeon and eight others (Note: Yoon Il-sang, Lee Chang-ui, Kim Ji-woong, Lee Hyun-do, Mad SoulChild, Jo Kyu-man, Bae Young-jun, Kim Seok-chan) – computer programming
- Park In-young, Kim Ji-woong – string arrangement
- Jeong Moo-kyung and nine others (Note: Ha Jung-su, Kim Young-sik, Kim Dong-hee, Choi Jae-young, Kim Hae-goo, Kim Gyun-jung, Choi Young-ui, Han Jae-eung, Kim Moon-hye) – recording
- Im Chang-deok, Ko Seung-wook, Park Byeong-jun, Han Jong-jin, Jo Jun-seong, Jeong Doo-seok – mixing
- Choi Hyo-young (Sonic Korea) – mastering
- Gugram Design – design, artwork
- Yoon Woo-taek – photography
- Jeong Bo-yoon, Jang Hyo-jin, Park Mi-ra – stylist
- Myungjin Art – printing

== Charts ==
=== Monthly charts ===
Chart (2003)	Peak position
South Korean Albums (RIAK)	3

=== Yearly charts ===
Chart (2003)	Position
South Korean Albums (RIAK)	15

== Sales ==
Region	Certification	Certified units/sales
South Korea	—	153,590
