= 10 Minutes (Lee Hyori song) =

Single by Lee Hyori

from the album Stylish...
- Released: August 13, 2003
- Recorded: 2003
- Genre: Bubblegum pop; R&B; hip hop
- Length: 3:54
- Label: DSP; CJ E&M
- Songwriter: MayBee
- Producer: Kim Do-hyun

Lee Hyori singles chronology
"10 Minutes" (2003)	"Hey Girl" (2003)

Music video
- "10 Minutes" on YouTube

"10 Minutes" is the debut single by South Korean recording artist Lee Hyori. It is taken from her debut studio album Stylish..., which was released through DSP Media and CJ E&M on August 13, 2003. A R&B and hip hop number, "10 Minutes" was written by MayBee with production handled by Kim Do-hyun. Following its release, the song became a commercial hit in South Korea and spurred numerous musical and fashion trends at the time—its popularity gave way to what domestic media dubbed as the "Hyori Syndrome".

The accompanying music video for "10 Minutes" was directed by Seo Hyun-seung; it was initially banned from broadcast by SBS, which judged its choreography to be too erotic. Lee promoted the song with live performances on various South Korean music programs throughout August and September, including Music Camp and Inkigayo. The song received multiple accolades at year-end award shows, including Most Popular Music Video at the 2003 Mnet Music Video Festival and the Grand Prize at the annual KBS Music Awards.

== Background and composition ==
"10 Minutes" – Lee Hyori
A sample of "10 Minutes", a hip hop and dance track that lyrically revolves around the theme of seductiveness.

Lee Hyori became well known in South Korea as a member of girl group Fin.K.L, who debuted in 1998 under DSP Media. The group released their final studio album, Forever, in March 2002. The album reached number two on the MIAK monthly album chart and sold over 250,000 copies. Beginning in 2003, the members began exploring individual activities, thus putting group activities in a temporary hiatus. Lee Hyori embarked on a solo career with the release of her debut studio album Stylish..., which spawned the lead single "10 Minutes".

"10 Minutes" is a hip hop-inspired dance-pop song, written by MayBee and composed by Kim Do-hyun. Im Jin-mo of IZM wrote that the song had a "sensuous rhythm", while Rolling Stone compared it to the music of Aaliyah and Jennifer Lopez, describing it as "groovy, synth-fueled R&B-pop". Lyrically, it depicts the singer seducing a man who already has a partner, asserting that she can make him hers in 10 minutes. The lyrics were originally for a song by hip hop group People Crew, but were instead given to Lee Hyori.

== Promotion ==
=== Music video ===
The accompanying music video was directed by Seo Hyun-seung, and shows Lee attracting a man who eventually leaves the woman he is interested in for the singer. The singer H appeared as the man whom Lee Hyori seduces, while Epik High also made a brief cameo. Upon the video's release, television network SBS banned it from public broadcast due to dance moves resembling sex, which SBS judged inappropriate for television. A re-edited version of the video with the scenes removed was soon sent to the network and was made available for broadcast. The video was well received—in an internet survey ranking the 100 best Korean music videos conducted by MTV Korea in July 2004, "10 Minutes" ranked at number three.

=== Live performances ===
To promote "10 Minutes" and Stylish..., Lee made appearances at various live concerts and weekly music programs following its release. On August 16, Lee made her first performance as a solo artist since Fin.K.L at the 2003 Star Ting Concert, where she performed "10 Minutes" and "One Two Three N'Four", despite a recording mishap. The following day, she made her live television debut with both songs on the music program Inkigayo; she continued to promote the song on different music programs throughout August and September. On November 27, she performed the song live at the 2003 Mnet Music Video Festival, where she was the most nominated act of the night. At the 2008 Mnet KM Music Festival, Lee and boy group Big Bang performed together a medley of their songs, which included parts of "10 Minutes".

== Awards ==
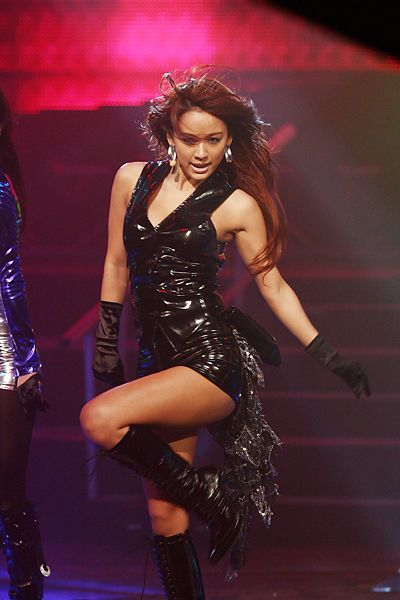
The song's popularity led to what South Korean media called the "Hyori Syndrome".

"10 Minutes" won numerous accolades, including the Most Popular Music Video daesang at the 2003 Mnet Music Video Festival and the Grand Prize at the annual KBS Music Awards. It won the Grand Prize at the 2003 SBS Gayo Daejeon.

Awards for "10 Minutes"
Year	Organization	Award	Result	Ref.
2003	KBS Music Awards	Grand Prize (Daesang)	Won	
2003	KBS Music Awards	Main Prize (Bonsang)	Won	
2003	Mnet Music Video Festival	Most Popular Music Video (Daesang)	Won	
2003	Mnet Music Video Festival	Best Female Artist	Nominated	
2003	Mnet Music Video Festival	Best Dance Performance	Nominated	
2003	SBS Gayo Daejeon	Grand Prize (Daesang)	Won	

Music program awards
Program	Date
Music Camp	September 6, 2003
Music Camp	September 20, 2003
Music Camp	September 27, 2003
Inkigayo	September 7, 2003
Inkigayo	September 14, 2003
Inkigayo	September 21, 2003

== In popular culture and covers ==
In 2024, "10 Minutes" experienced a resurgence on TikTok, igniting a Y2K aesthetics trend known as the "10 Minutes Challenge".

Various K-pop artists have performed covers of the song, including Twice's Nayeon, Momo and Jihyo, Loossemble, Everglow, Class:y, Ichillin', Laboum, and a joint performance from Kard's Jiwoo and CLC's Yeeun. Itzy's Yeji, Ryujin, and Chaeryoung, Riize, and Cha Eun-woo additionally covered the song on The Seasons: Lee Hyori's Red Carpet, hosted by Lee herself, in 2024.

== Cultural impact ==
Lee's solo debut with "10 Minutes" has been noted by publications as the mark of her transition to a primarily sexual image. The Korea Herald noted how the track led to a wave of interest that came to be known as "Hyori Syndrome", leading her to be dubbed the "sexy queen of K-pop". Writing about the effect of the "Hyori Syndrome" in the industry, an editor from Beautytap said that "the flirty images of K-pop girl groups today can be credited in large part to Hyori pushing the limits"; "Hyori rocked racy outfits, danced provocatively in her videos, and didn't seem afraid to push the limits of what was considered 'acceptable sex appeal' at the time in Korea." A reporter from domestic media outlet Star News wrote that since "10 Minutes" in 2003, Lee created a boom in the industry among women of all ages, and became a trendsetter in the South Korean fashion world.

Having appeared on the front page of newspapers 891 times after the release of "10 Minutes", Lee set a Guinness World Record at the time for the highest number of front-page newspaper appearances. In 2007, The Korea Times named Lee one of 10 Influential Women on the Cultural Scene since 1950, saying that "the Lee Hyori syndrome spread around the country" after the release of "10 Minutes", leading to her becoming a fashion icon and the highest-paid female singer in Korea at that point. Marie Claire included the song in their list of 35 essential K-pop songs, writing that "it was so popular that 2003 was nicknamed 'The Year of Hyori' in Korean media." In a panel of 35 music critics organized by Seoul Shinmun and Melon, "10 Minutes" was ranked the 16th greatest K-pop song of all-time; music critic Subtle said that the song yielded major influence on female idols, which still showed years after its initial release. Rolling Stone ranked "10 Minutes" number 24 in their list of the 100 greatest Korean pop songs all time, remarking how she became "an inescapable presence in Korea around the release of her solo debut."
