= MayBee =

South Korean singer (born 1979)

- Born: Kim Eun-ji; September 10, 1979 (age 47); South Korea
- Genres: K-pop, R&B
- Occupations: Singer; songwriter; actress; radio presenter
- Years active: 2001–present
- Labels: Mnet Media; Blue Bridge
- Spouse: Yoon Sang-hyun (m. 2015)

Korean name
- Hangul: 김은지
- RR: Gim Eunji
- MR: Kim Ŭnji

Kim Eun-ji (Korean: 김은지; born 10 September 1979), better known as MayBee (메이비), is a South Korean singer, lyricist, actress and radio presenter. She hosted KBS Cool FM's Pump Up the Volume radio show from 2006 to 2010.

== Personal life ==
MayBee married actor Yoon Sang-hyun on February 8, 2015. The couple became engaged in November 2014 after eight months of dating.

== Discography ==
=== Studio albums ===
Title	Album details	Peak chart positions	Sales
Title	Album details	KOR	Sales
A Letter From Abell 1689	Release date: April 6, 2006; Label: Mnet Media; Format: CD, cassette; Track listing: 1. 2046; 2. 미열; 3. 숨 4. 다소; 5. 내사랑 무덤까지; 6. I Wish...; 7. Candy; 8. 잘가; 9. 어제; 10. 좋은 사람 만나요; 11. 늦잠; 12. Love²; 13. 해바라기; 14. A Letter From Abell 1689	—	—N/a
Luv Cloud	Release date: October 4, 2007; Label: Mnet Media; Format: CD; Track listing: 1. Blue Bridge; 2. 엉엉 울었어; 3. 못난이; 4. 미치도록; 5. 아침 10시; 6. 툭 7. 그 사람; 8. 샤랄라 숑 9. Day Dream; 10. Go Maybee; 11. 그대와 마지막 춤을; 12. 못난이 (classic ver.); 13. 미치도록 (rock ver.); 14. Happy Virus	24	KOR: 4,693
"—" denotes release did not chart.

=== Singles ===
Title	Year	Peak chart positions	Album
Title	Year	KOR	Album
"Honjanmal" (혼잣말)	2004	—N/a	Non-album single
"Big Smile" (다소)	2006	—N/a	A Letter From Abell 1689
"Ugly" (못난이)	2008	—N/a	Luv Cloud
"Eojjeom joa" (어쩜 좋아)	2008	—N/a	Eyes On Me single album
"Raiya" (라이야)	2008	—N/a	Non-album singles
"Goodbye Valentine"	2011	36	Non-album singles
"Mille Feuille"	2013	—	3 Women In Inotia
"Are You Well?" (잘 지내니) feat. Nuck	2013	26	Non-album singles
"Tomorrow" (내일도 맑음)	2013	69	Non-album singles
"Odd Eye"	2013	—	Non-album singles
"Cool Down" (식다) with J'Kyun	2014	—	Non-album singles
"Balsam Red" (봉숭아 물들다) with Yoon Sang-hyun	2015	—	Non-album singles
"—" denotes release did not chart.

== Songwriting credits ==
Below is a list of MayBee's lyric-writing credits for songs by other artists. All information is from the Korea Music Copyright Association online database. MayBee's writer ID is W0436200.

Year	Artist	Title
2001	Rich	"Break Up"
2001	Rich	"It's Alright"
2002	Bobo	"Predicted Break-up" (예감했던이별)
2002	Harisu	"Happy My Life"
2002	Harisu	"Red"
2002	Lee Ki-chan	"I Yeon" (이연)
2002	People Crew	"Love Scene"
2003	Jang Na-ra	"My Boy"
2003	Lee Hyori	"10 Minutes"
2003	Lee Hyori	"Remember Me"
2003	M	"For You"
2003	M	"Chag Gag" (착각)
2004	Harisu	"Foxy Lady"
2004	Kim Jong-kook	"Forgiveness" (용서)
2004	Kim Jong-kook	"Addiction" (중독)
2004	Kim Jong-kook	"Only One Day" (하루만)
2004	MC Mong	"My Memory in 1995"
2005	Fin.K.L	"Butterfly"
2005	Jeon Hye-bin	"Pinky"
2005	Lyn	"Naughty Girl"
2005	One Two	"Memories"
2005	Woo Soo	"3.14 (Circle Ratio)"
2005	Woo Soo	"Seub Gwan"
2006	Fly to the Sky	"Hot and Cold"
2006	Lee Hyori	"Get Ya"
2007	M. Street	"How Do I"
2007	M.A.C	"Like A Star"
2008	MC Mong feat. Yangpa	"Cloud Nine"
2009	Ayana	"Hanabi" (하나비)
2009	Clara	"OH3"
2009	M.A.C	"Melody"
2010	Big Mama	"Rainbow Dream"
2010	Kim Jin-pyo feat. K.Will	"Don't Say Anything" (아무 말도 하지마)
2011	Youngjun	"Pray"
2012	Apink	"Cat" (고양이)
2013	So Ji-sub feat. Mellow	"Eraser"
2014	Takers	"Wish You Call Me Oppa"

== Filmography ==
=== Television ===
- Pink Lipstick – Park Jung-hee

== Awards and nominations ==
Year	Award	Category	Nominated work	Result	Ref.
2006	Mnet Asian Music Awards	Best New Artist	"Big Smile" (다소)	Nominated	
