= MAMA Award for Best Female Artist =

Award presented annually by CJ E&M Pictures (Mnet)

- Country: South Korea
- Presented by: CJ E&M Pictures (Mnet)
- First award: 1999
- Currently held by: Rosé (2025)

Highlights
- Most awards: IU (6)
- Most nominations: IU (11)
- Website: Mnet Asian Music Awards

The MAMA Award for Best Female Artist (여자 가수상) is an award presented annually by CJ E&M Pictures (Mnet).

It was first awarded at the 1st Mnet Asian Music Awards ceremony held in 1999; Uhm Jung-hwa won the award for her song "I Don't Know", and it is given in honor of a female artist with the best performance in the music industry.

== Winners and nominees ==
=== 1990s ===
Year	Winner	Work	Nominees
1999	Uhm Jung-hwa	"I Don't Know"	Kim Jin-won – "Happy Birthday To You"; Lena Park – "A Person in My Dream"; Park Ji-yoon – "I Do Not Know Anything"; Yangpa – "Adios"

=== 2000s ===
Year	Winner	Work	Nominees
2000	Park Ji-yoon	"Coming of Age Ceremony"	Kim Hyun-jung – "Are You Really"; Baek Ji-young – "Sad Salsa"; Uhm Jung-hwa – "Cross"; Lee Jung-hyun – "Peace"
2001	Kim Hyun-jung	"You Who Left"	Yangpa – "Special Night"; Uhm Jung-hwa – "Crack"; J – "The Saddest Words"; T – "As Time Goes By"
2002	Jang Na-ra	"Sweet Dream"	Kim Hyun-jung – "Knife"; BoA – "No. 1"; Wax – "Please"; Lee Soo-young – "La La La"
2003	Lee Soo-young	"Solitary"	Bada – "Music"; BoA – "Atlantis Princess"; Wax – "Relationship"; Lee Hyori – "10 Minutes"
2004	Lee Soo-young	"Whistle to Me"	Gummy – "Loss Of Memory"; BoA – "My Name"; Eugene – "Windy"; Jang Na-ra – "Is That True?
2005	BoA	"Girls on Top"	Gummy – "No"; Lexy – "Tears"; Jang Yoon-jeong – "Really!"; Chae Yeon – "Two Of Us"
2006	Baek Ji-young	"I Won't Love"	Bada – "V.I.P"; Park Jung-ah – "Yeah"; Lee Soo-young – "Grace"; Lee Hyori – "Shall We Dance?"
2007	Ivy	"Sonata of Temptation"	Baek Ji-young – "I Only Need One Love"; Yangpa – "Love... What Is It?"; Lee Hyori – "Toc Toc Toc"; Chae Yeon – "My Love"
2008	Lee Hyori	"U-Go-Girl"	Gummy – "I'm Sorry" ft. T.O.P; Seo In-young – "Cinderella"; Uhm Jung-hwa – "Disco" ft. T.O.P; Younha – "Telepathy"
2009	Baek Ji-young	—N/a	Bada; Son Dam-bi; Younha; Chae Yeon

=== 2010s ===
Year	Winner	Nominees
2010	BoA	Gummy; Son Dam-bi; Seo In-young; Lee Hyori
2011	Baek Ji-young	Kim Wan-sun; Seo In-young; IU; G.NA
2012	IU	Baek Ji-young; BoA; Ga-in; G.NA
2013	Lee Hyori	Ailee; Baek Ji-young; IU; Sunmi
2014	IU	Sunmi; Ailee; Hyuna; Hyolyn
2015	Taeyeon	BoA; IU; Ailee; Hyuna
2016	Taeyeon	Ailee; Baek Ayeon; Lee Hi; Jeong Eunji
2017	IU	Sunmi; Suzy; Taeyeon; Heize
2018	Sunmi	IU; Chungha; Taeyeon; Heize
2019	Chungha	Jennie; Taeyeon; Heize; Hwasa

=== 2020s ===
Year	Winner	Nominees
2020	IU	Sunmi; Chungha; Taeyeon; Hwasa
2021	IU	Heize; Lisa; Rosé; Taeyeon
2022	Nayeon	Taeyeon; IU; Miyeon; Seulgi
2023	Jisoo	Hwasa; Jeon Somi; Jihyo; Lee Chae-yeon; Choi Ye-na
2024	IU	Jennie; Nayeon; Taeyeon; Yuqi
2025	Rosé	Jennie; Jisoo; Taeyeon; Yuqi

== Multiple awards ==
6 wins

- IU

3 wins

- Baek Ji-young

2 wins

- Lee Hyori
- BoA
- Lee Soo-young
- Taeyeon

^{^[I]} Each year is linked to the article about the Mnet Asian Music Awards held that year.

== Gallery ==
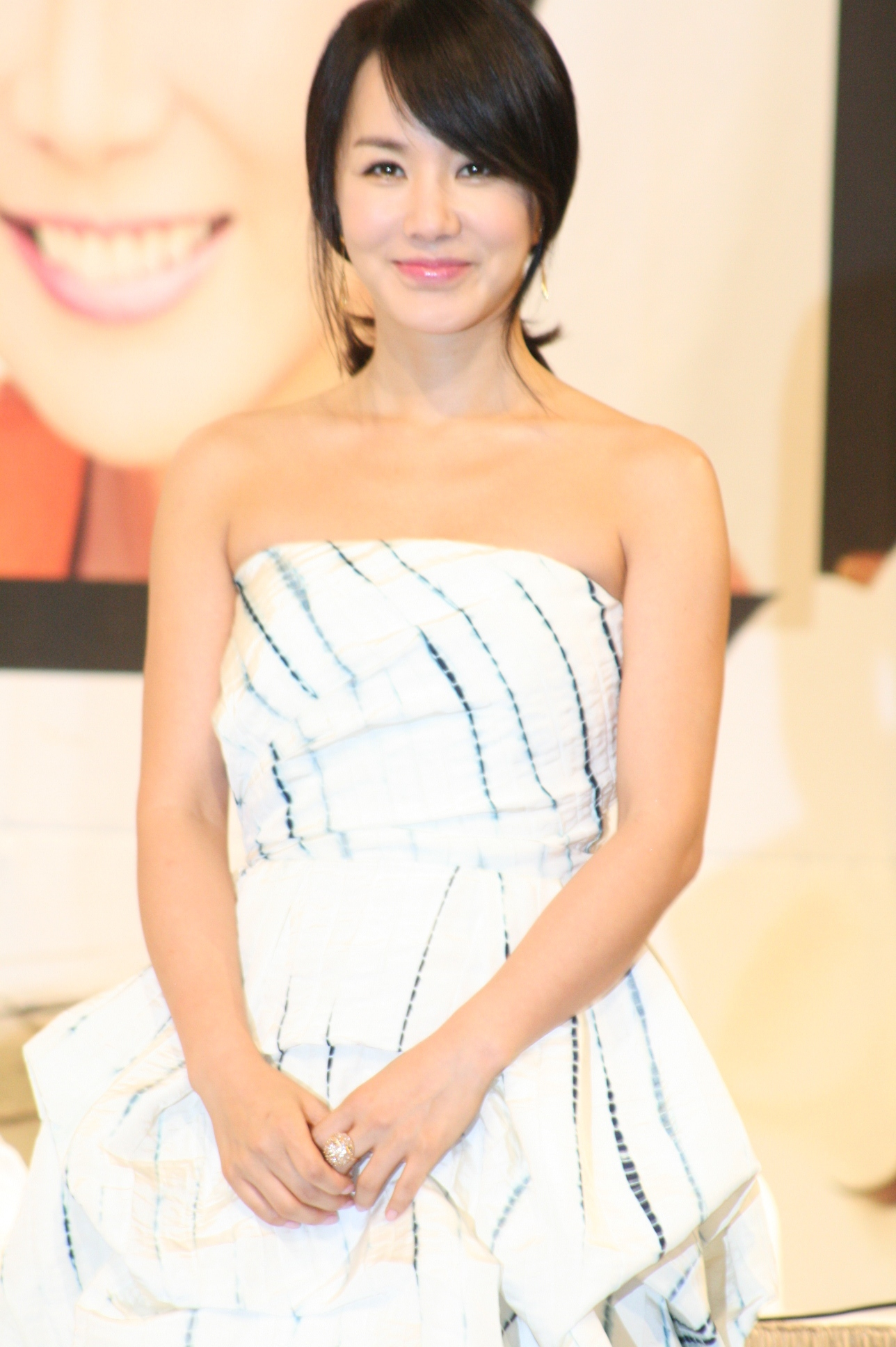
Uhm Jung-hwa (1999)

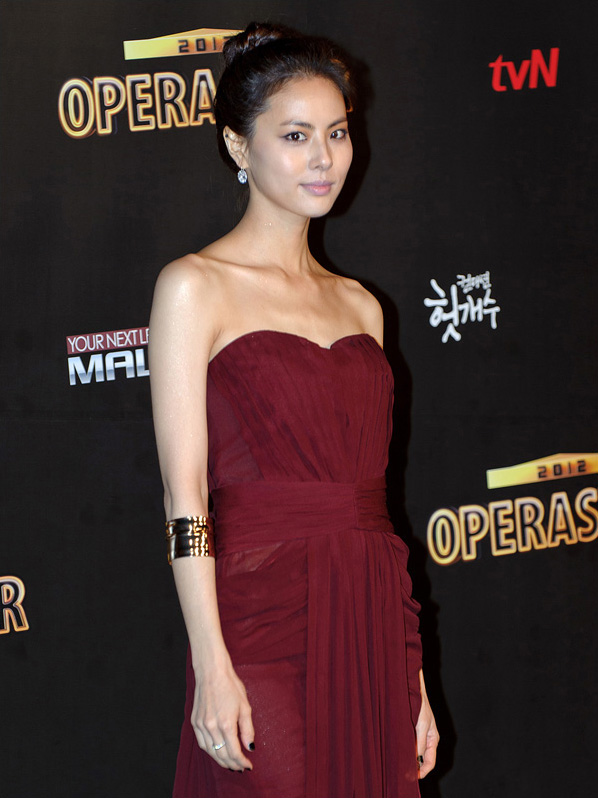
Park Ji-yoon (2000)

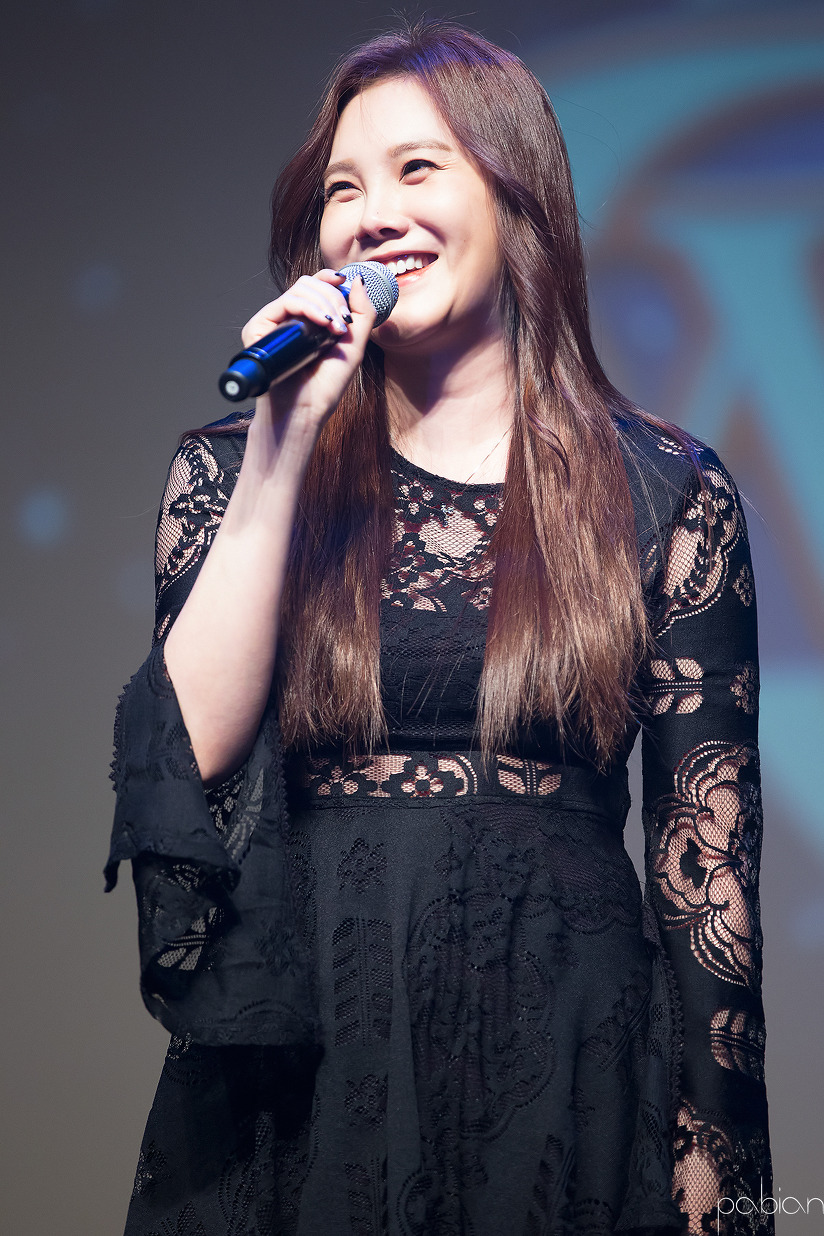
Kim Hyun-jung (2001)

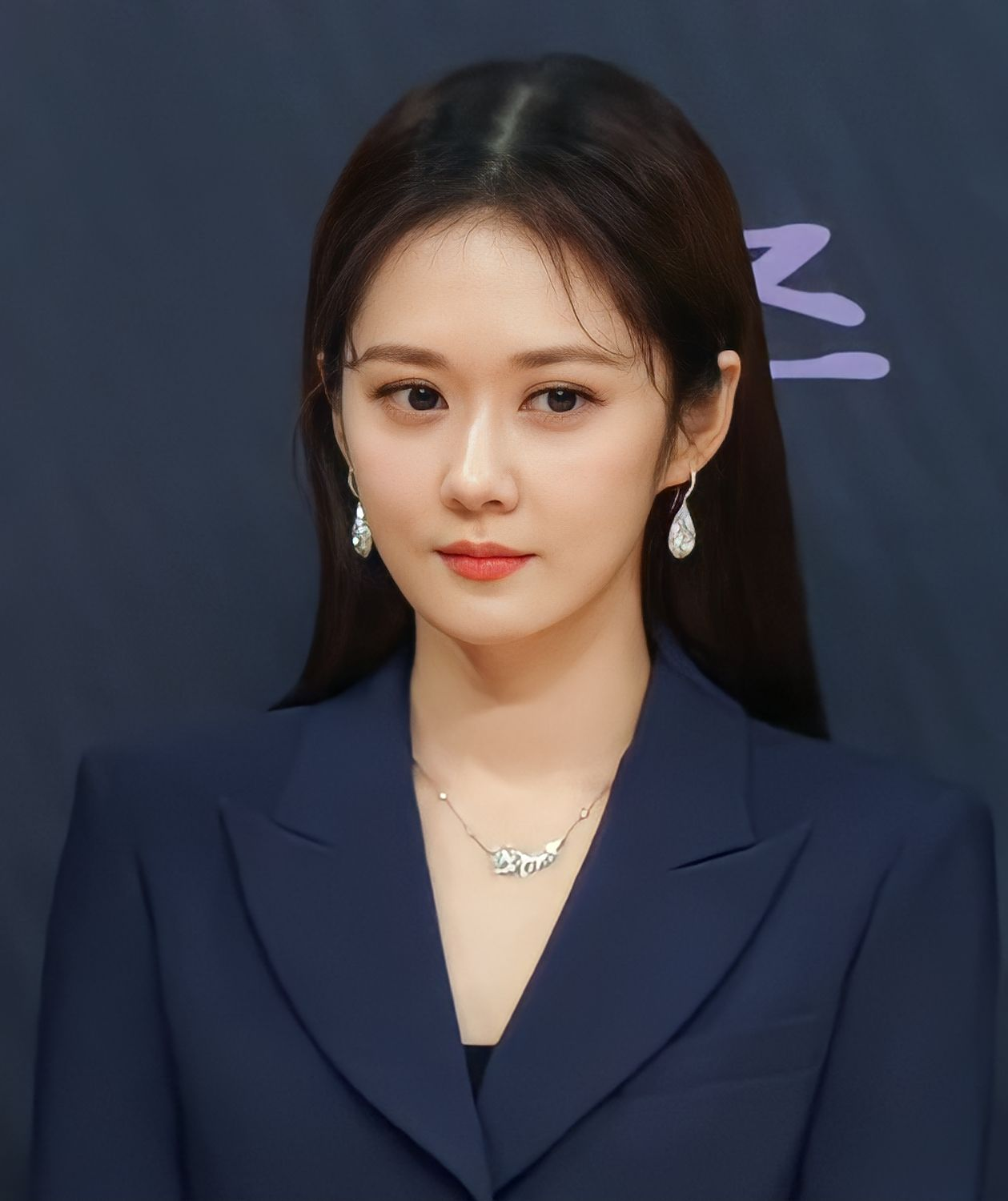
Jang Na-ra (2002)

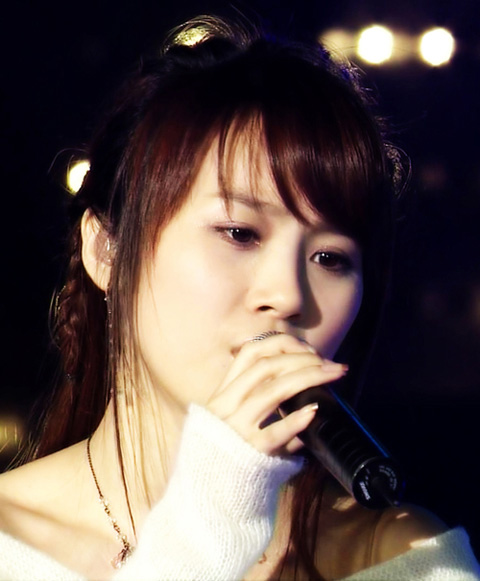
Lee Soo-young (2003–04)

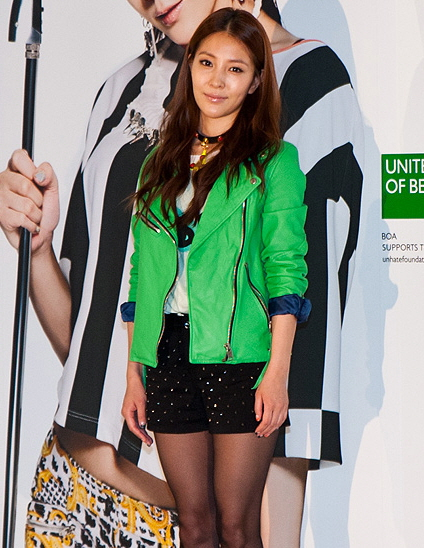
BoA (2005, 2010)

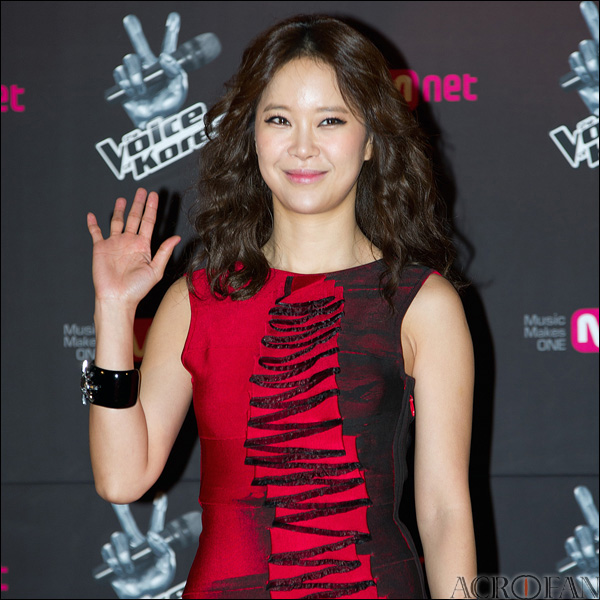
Baek Ji-young (2006, 2009, 2011)

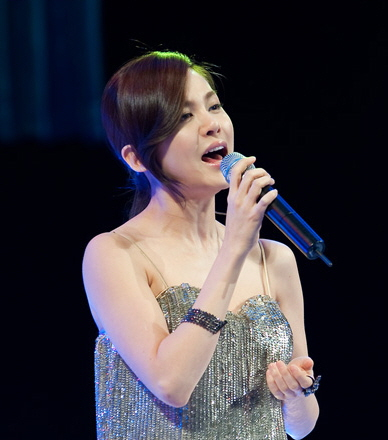
Ivy (2007)

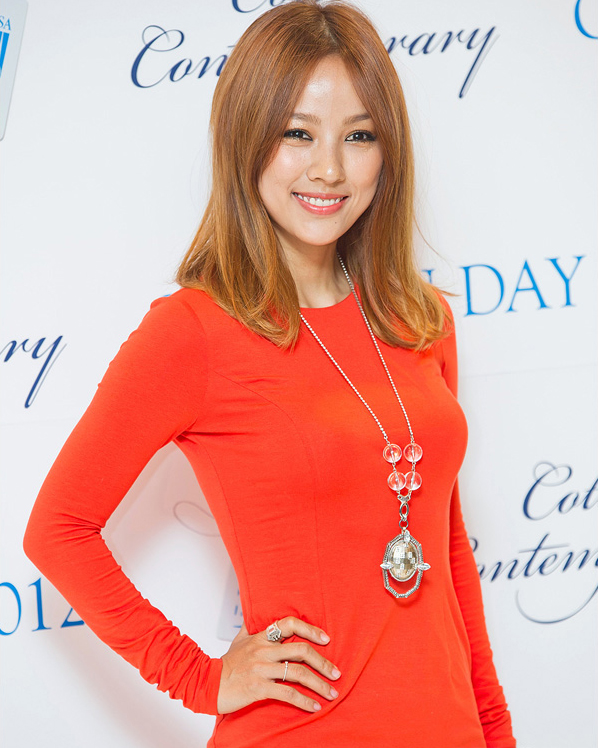
Lee Hyori (2008, 2013)

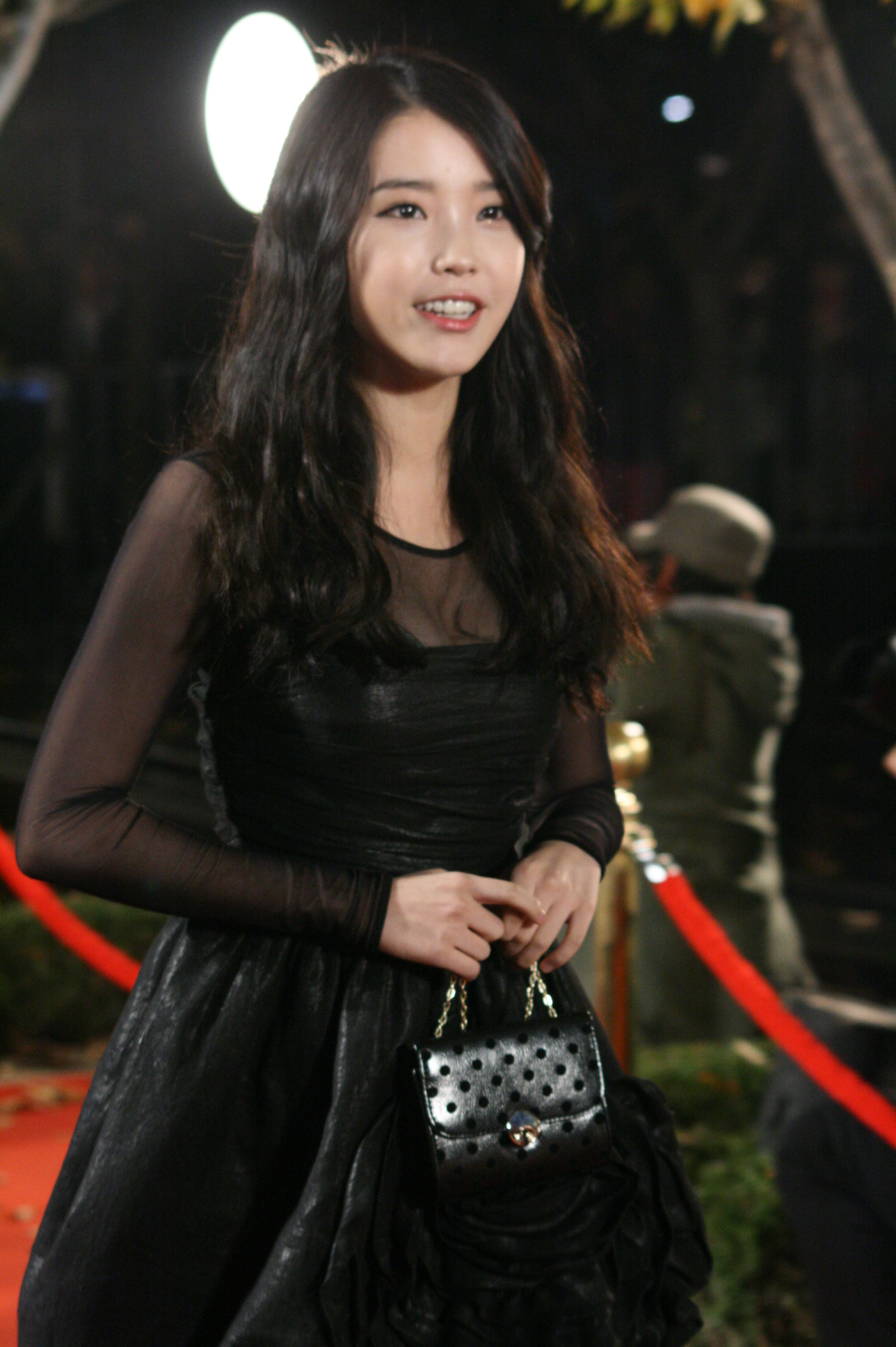
IU, (2012, 2014, 2017, 2020–21, 2024)

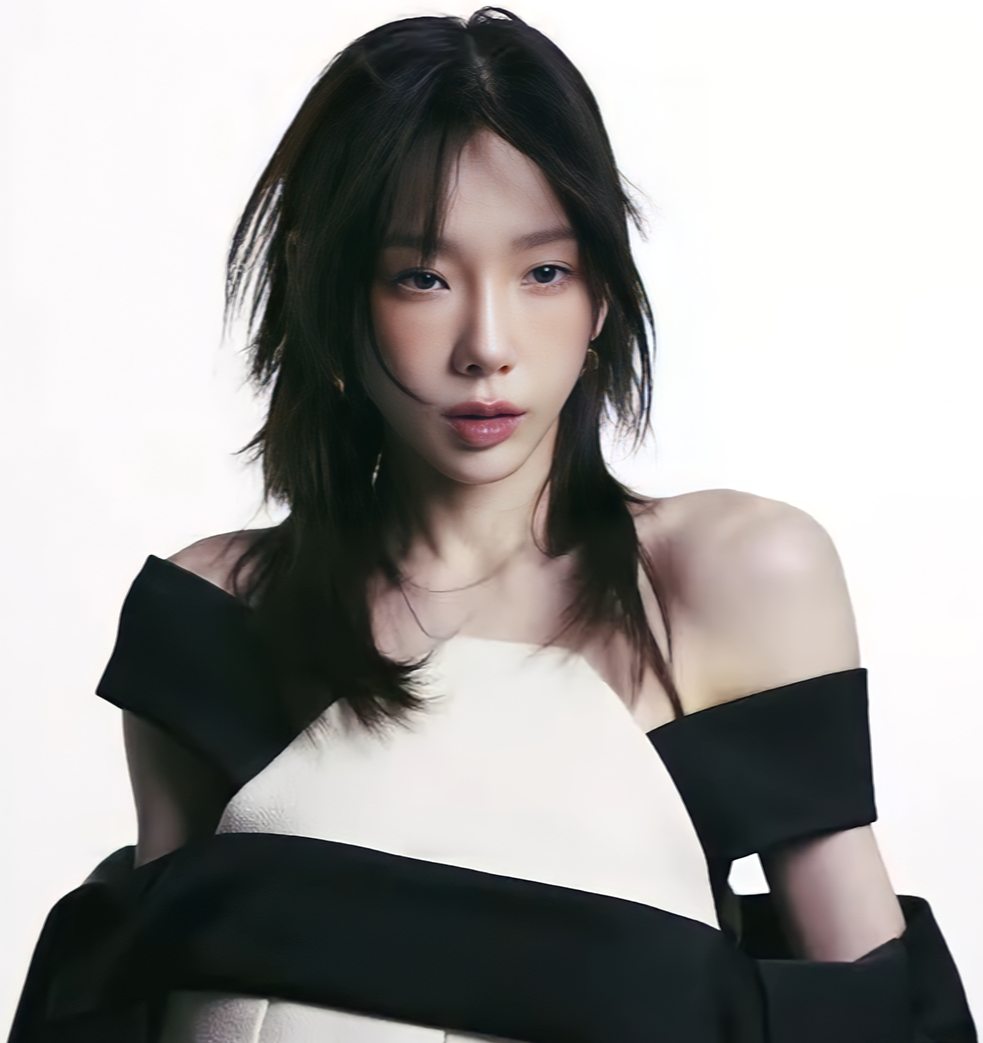
Taeyeon (2015–16)

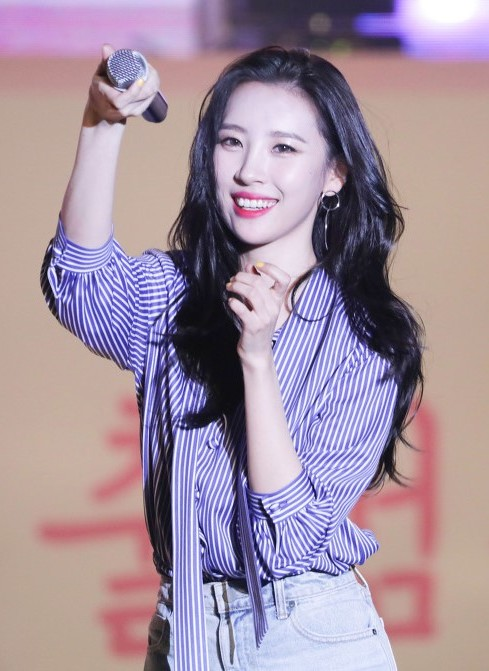
Sunmi (2018)

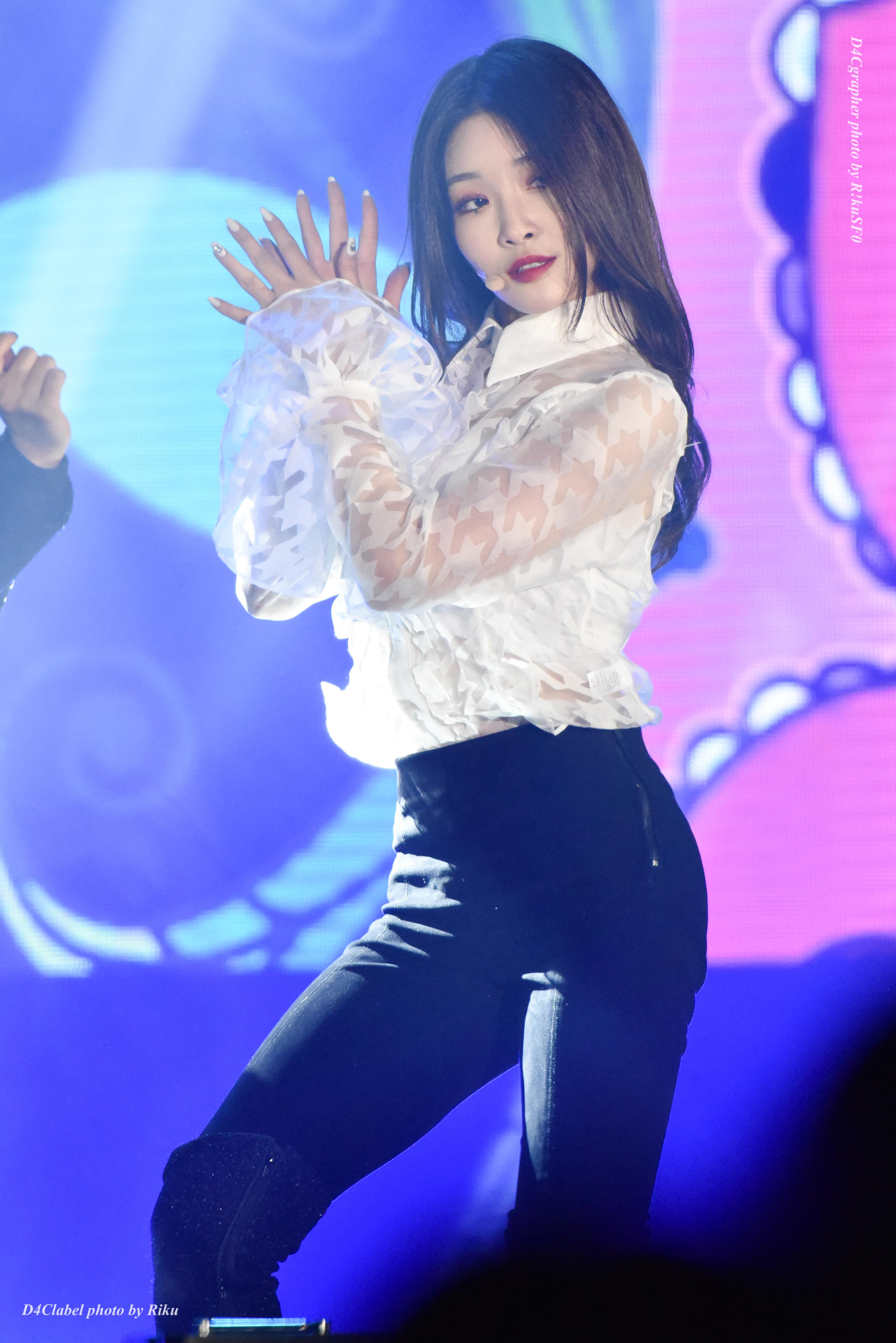
Chungha (2019)

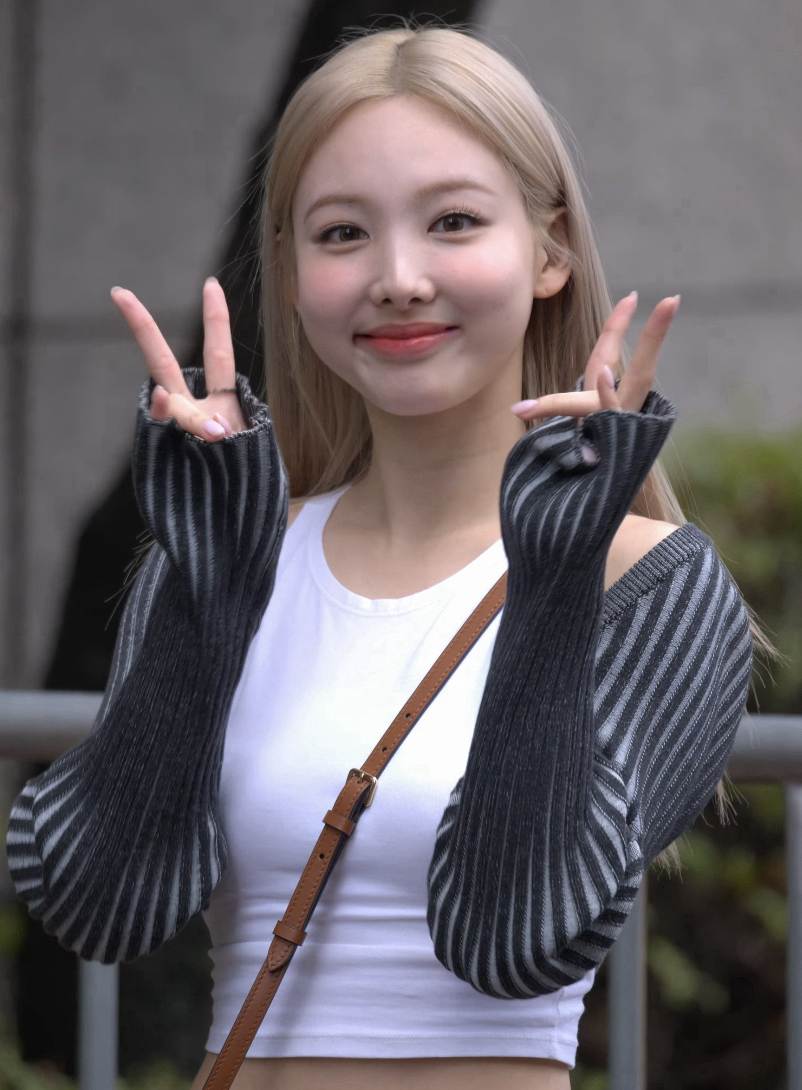
Nayeon (2022)

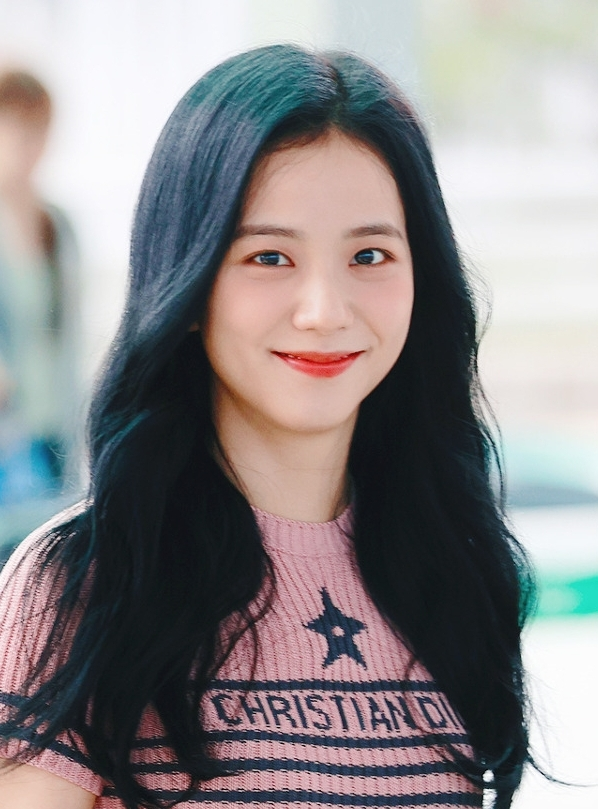
Jisoo (2023)

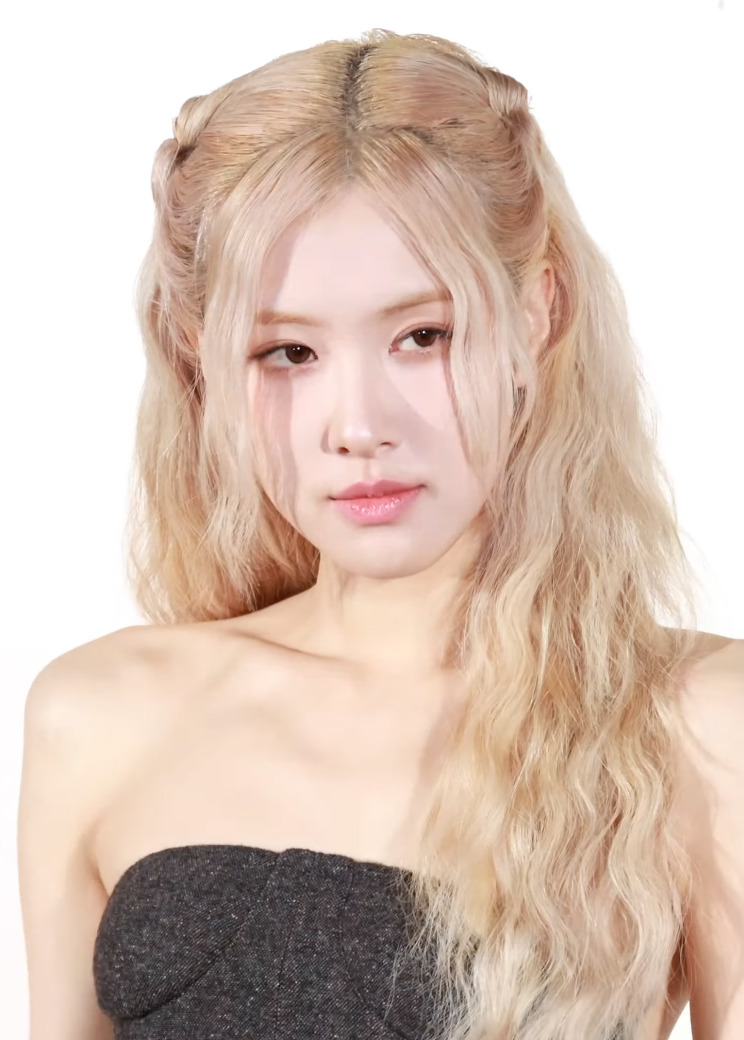
Rosé (2025)

== See also ==
- List of music awards honoring women
