= Lee Hyori =

South Korean singer (born 1979)

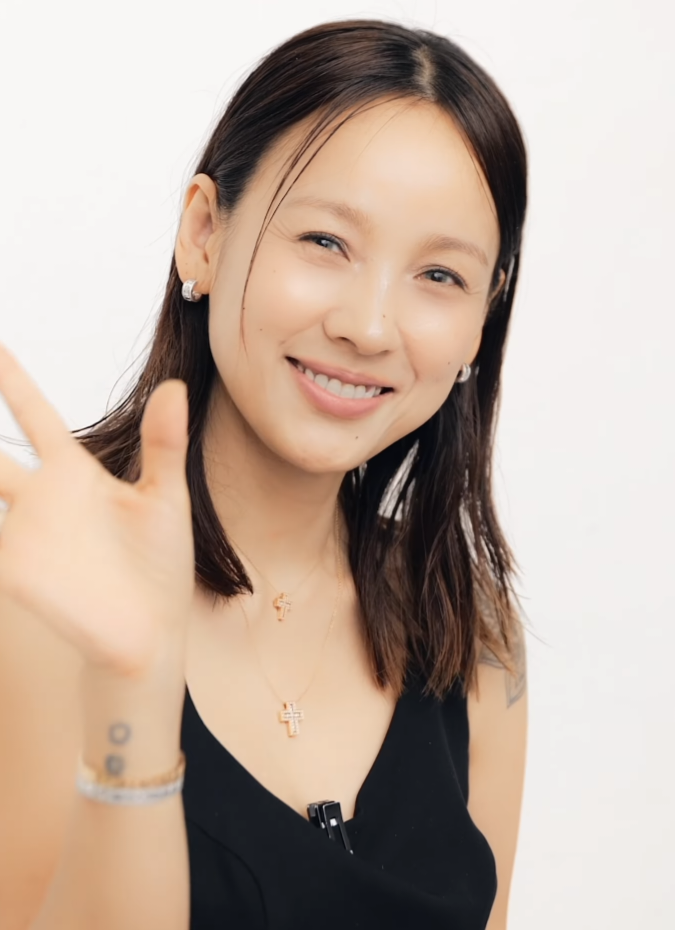
- Lee in May 2025
- Born: May 10, 1979 (age 47); Cheongwon, South Korea
- Other names: Linda.G; Lee Chun Ok
- Occupations: Singer; television personality; actress
- Agent: Antenna
- Spouse: Lee Sang-soon (m. 2013)
- Musical career
- Genres: K-pop; R&B
- Instrument: Vocals
- Years active: 1998–present
- Labels: DSP; Mnet Media; B2M; Kiwi Media
- Member of: Fin.K.L
- Formerly of: SSAK3; Refund Sisters

Korean name
- Hangul: 이효리
- Hanja: 李孝利
- RR: I Hyori
- MR: I Hyori

Lee Hyori (Korean: 이효리; born May 10, 1979) is a South Korean singer and television personality. She debuted as a member of group Fin.K.L in 1998, which became one of the most popular girl groups in South Korea during the late 1990s and early 2000s. Aside from Fin.K.L, she has also participated in several project groups, including the Refund Sisters and SSAK3 in 2020.

Lee made her solo debut in August 2003 with the release of Stylish.... The album sold over 150,000 copies and spawned the hit single "10 Minutes". The song received widespread recognition in South Korea and led Lee to win numerous grand prizes (daesangs) at domestic year-end award ceremonies, including at the KBS Music Awards, SBS Gayo Daejeon, Mnet Music Video Festival, and the Seoul Music Awards. Her significant popularity in South Korea at the time was dubbed the "Hyori Syndrome" by Korean media, with some also deeming 2003 "the year of Hyori".

Lee's sophomore studio album, Dark Angel (2006), spawned several singles including "Get Ya!". The album was a critical failure, however, with "Get Ya!" receiving accusations of plagiarism. Her third studio album, It's Hyorish (2008), was better received critically and became the best-selling album by a female soloist in 2008. Its single, "U-Go-Girl", ranked atop the music program charts for multiple weeks. Lee once again faced plagiarism accusations with her next album, H-Logic (2010), when composer Bahnus was found to have plagiarized seven of the album's tracks. She subsequently took a temporarily hiatus from the entertainment industry, and became a spokesperson for various causes such as animal rights.

On television, Lee was dubbed the "Nation's Fairy" during her days on variety show Family Outing, and received the Grand Prize at the 2009 SBS Entertainment Awards for the program (alongside Yoo Jae-suk). In 2006, Lee became the highest-paid female singer in South Korea when she signed a contract with Mnet Media. The Korea Times named Lee one of the top 10 Most Influential Women on the Cultural Scene since 1950. Mnet ranked her number 42 in their Legend 100 Artists list in 2013.

== Biography ==
=== 1979–1997: Early life ===
Lee was born on May 10, 1979 in Osong-ri, Cheongwon County, North Chungcheong Province, South Korea, as the youngest of three daughters. Lee grew up impoverished, in a barbershop of about 8 pyeong (approximately 285 square feet). After being expelled from middle school once, Lee worked part-time at a restaurant and was scouted by an agency and cast by the manager of H.O.T.. Lee was discovered while taking sticker pictures with her friends. She prepared for a girl group debut while living as a trainee of SM Entertainment before eventually debuting as the leader of Fin.K.L.

=== 1998–2002: Career beginnings in Fin.K.L ===
Lee began her career as part of South Korean pop girl group Fin.K.L. As the eldest member, she was the leader of the group. She was the last member to join Fin.K.L, just before their debut in January 1998. Fin.K.L debuted officially on May 22, 1998, with their first single "Blue Rain". The second release from their debut album, "To My Boyfriend", became the first of their multiple number one hits. Fin.K.L became one of the most popular and successful South Korean pop groups of all-time, rivaling fellow popular girl group S.E.S.

=== 2003–2005: Stylish... ===
A year after Fin.K.L's fourth studio album Forever, her solo debut album was released in August 2003, entitled Stylish.... The lead single "10 Minutes" became one of her signature hits and the singer nearly swept the daesangs, the most prestigious South Korean music award, winning more than seven of them, including three of the four most prestigious daesangs. Stylish... sold 144,182 copies in South Korea alone, according to the Music Industry Association of Korea in 2003. Her popularity in her various activities eventually was dubbed as the "Hyori Syndrome" in South Korea, and the Korean Media nicknamed 2003 "The Year of Hyori" as she was rarely out of the news all year. She won numerous awards for "10 Minutes" at the end of the year, including Most Popular Music Video (daesang) at the 2003 Mnet Music Video Festival, and the grand prizes and the SBS Gayo Daejeon and KBS Music Awards.

In January 2005, Lee made her acting debut in the SBS TV series Three Leaf Clover, starring opposite Ryu Jin, Kim Jung-hwa, Kim Kang-woo, and Lee Hoon. However, the 16-episode drama received low ratings (less than 10%) and Lee was criticized for her acting, with viewers saying she was miscast as a downtrodden but cheerful steel mill worker. On August 8, 2005, she co-hosted the annual Korean Music Festival for the second year running.

In 2025, she appeared in an ad for Anycall opposite Jo Myung-Ae, a North Korean dancer. It was the first time a North Korean appeared in a South Korean ad.

=== 2006–2007: Signing with Mnet and Dark Angel ===
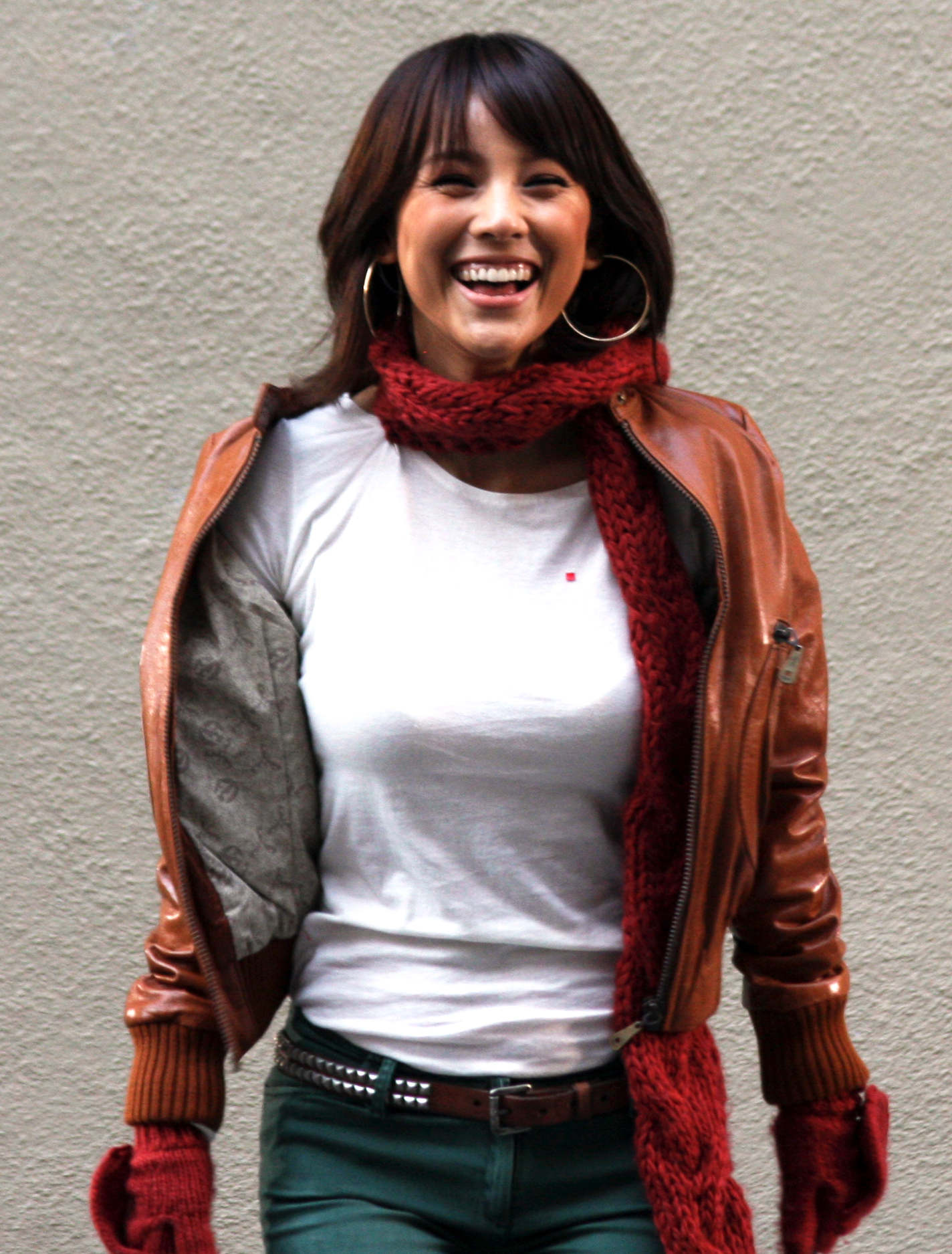
Lee in 2007

In February 2006, Lee released her follow-up album, Dark Angel. The first single, "Get Ya!", was accused of being plagiarized by the songwriters of Britney Spears' single "Do Somethin'". It was reported that Lee had signed a three-year contract with Mnet Entertainment (currently Stone Music Entertainment) for ₩2.2 billion, becoming the highest-paid female singer in South Korea (approx. US$2.2 million per year).

Despite the failure of her previous drama Three Leaf Clover, in 2007, Lee starred opposite Lee Dong-gun in the mini-drama If in Love... Like Them. Although originally announced as being only one episode long, it aired for four episodes on Mnet. An edited two-episode version of the drama also ran on SBS. During filming, part of a roof Lee was standing on collapsed. Only her foot fell through, but reportedly the fall might have been fatal if co-star Lee Dong-gun had not rescued her.

In February 2007, Lee announced her new digital single which would essentially be the soundtrack to If in Love... Like Them. She performed all three main tracks from the single on Inkigayo on February 25, 2007. The lead song was "Toc Toc Toc" (톡톡톡; Toktoktok). Despite the single's genre being R&B, Lee began to sing more ballads afterwards, slowly moving away from her "sexy superstar" image. The single, although initially given a digital-only release, was given a limited retail release of only 30,000 copies. It was released on March 6, 2007, and in addition to the three tracks found in the digital single, it included a reworked version of "Toc Toc Toc." It was the best-selling album for that month, selling 27,845 copies.

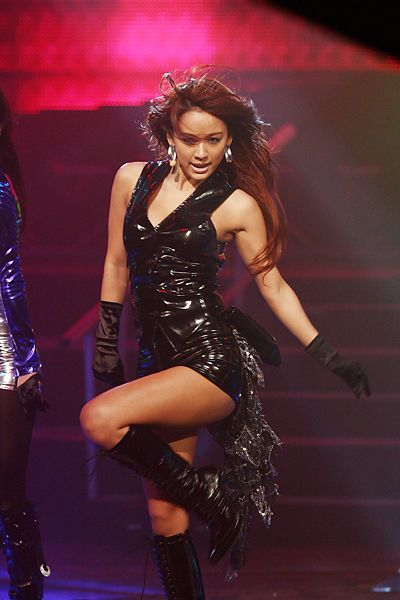
Lee performing on February 25, 2007

Although her single was commercially successful, her drama was heavily penalized for violating advertising guidelines, as If in Love... Like Them had several instances of overt product placement, in addition to using Lee's songs in the soundtrack. The Korean Broadcasting Committee ruled that the drama should not be aired in South Korea again, and that the network must apologize to its viewers.

Lee also did promotions in Japan when Japanese network Fuji TV aired If in Love... Like Them, where Lee was given the same VIP treatment offered to other international stars. The drama was broadcast on CS Fuji, a smaller satellite channel that Fuji TV owned.

=== 2008–2009: TV hosting and It's Hyorish ===
During breaks in her solo music career, Lee also hosted various television programs, including Time Machine and Happy Together, which she co-hosted with Yoo Jae-suk in 2006. On April 8, 2008, she joined KBS's Sang Sang Plus as a co-host alongside Country Kkokko members Shin Jung-hwan and Tak Jae-hoon. She was one of the original co-hosts of Change, a show on SBS's Good Sunday line-up, before leaving in early July. She is also a former cast member of the variety show Family Outing, appearing in only the first season. Mnet ran a 12-episode show called Off the Record: Lee Hyori, which documented Lee's life on-set for three months; the show's purpose was to lessen the gap between the singer and her fans/anti-fans by letting them see that she is just another human being like everyone.

Her third studio album, It's Hyorish, was released on July 14, 2008. "U-Go-Girl", the first single from the album, peaked at number 1 on online and offline charts, including various television music shows. On December 20, 2008, Lee held her first solo concert Lee Hyori the Invincible at the Jamsil Arena. Upon release, tickets to the concert sold out in five minutes. In November 2009, her contract with Mnet Media was set to expire. Lee planned to sign a contract with Gil Entertainment (currently B2M Entertainment) and work with Gil Jong-hwa, Fin.K.L's co-manager who had worked with the group since its debut. However, her 2010 album was released under the label of Mnet Media.

=== 2010–2015: H-Logic, Album plagiarism controversy and Monochrome ===
Almost two years after her previous album, Lee returned with H-Logic on April 12, 2010. The album has 14 tracks, including collaborations with Daesung from Big Bang, Jeon Ji-yoon from 4Minute, Bekah from After School, Gary from Leessang, and Sangchu from Mighty Mouth. The singer worked also with E-Tribe, the team behind "U-Go-Girl", the lead single from her previous album. A music video was released for "Swing" (그네; Geune), featuring Gary from Leessang, on March 31, 2010. The lead single "Chitty Chitty Bang Bang" and its music video were released soon after. The self-penned song, which features Ceejay (from Freshboyz), was released the same day as her album. She won two Mutizen Song awards on The Music Trend for her lead single within two weeks.

Soon after the release of the album H-Logic, seven of its songs, composed by Bahnus, were accused of plagiarism (among the allegedly plagiarized songs was "Bring It Back," performed by Canadian girl group Cookie Couture). On June 21, 2010, Lee admitted that the plagiarism accusations against her album were true, saying she had been "deceived"; she temporarily stopped all her activities as a singer and suspended her TV appearances.

While on hiatus, Lee began to grow as a cultural influence. She wrote online columns for vernacular newspapers such as The Hankyoreh that mixed her thoughts on life and career with social commentary, and was well reviewed for her simple prose, humor and intelligence. She also became an increasing presence in the civic community, emerging as one of the country's most high-profile animals rights activists. In 2011, Lee released two charity songs for donation to animal shelters, "Please Stay Behind" (남아 주세요; Nama juseyo) and "Remember" (기억해; Gieokhae).

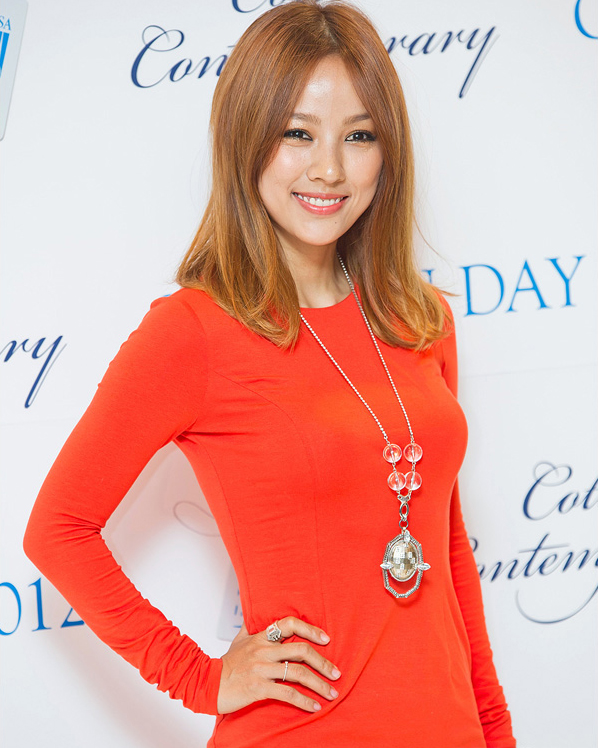
Lee in 2012

Beginning March 4, 2012, she and singer-songwriter/pianist Jung Jae-hyung hosted the music show Jung Jae-hyung & Lee Hyori's You and I on SBS. The show aired its final episode on October 14, 2012, ending its ten-month run due to low ratings. After her comeback was pushed back several times throughout 2012, it was announced that Lee would return to the stage with her fifth full-length album in May 2013. Five video teasers were released on YouTube on April 23, 2013. On May 6, 2013, she released her pre-release track for the album, titled "Miss Korea" (미스코리아). Lee herself wrote and composed the sophisticated retro-jazz song (it was arranged by her then-boyfriend, guitarist Lee Sang-soon), and the full-version music video released on the same day was a black-and-white video depicting Lee as a circa 1950s-type glamorous Miss Korea pageant crown holder. She personally selected 30 non-celebrity women "with love and respect for themselves" who she saw as the genuine Miss Korea's to perform the song with her on stage at the 2013 SBS Gayo Daejeon televised concert.

Her fifth studio album, Monochrome, was released on May 21, 2013. Lee wrote the lyrics for eight of the 16 tracks on the album, and reportedly used a full band instead of using electronically generated sounds for the songs. Upon its release, eight tracks were ranked in the top 10 on Bugs, Olleh and Naver Music, while its lead track, "Bad Girls" topped the charts on Melon, Naver, Olleh and Bugs. She performed "Bad Girls" as part of a highly praised collaboration stage at the 2013 SBS Gayo Daejeon televised concert along with CL from girl group 2NE1, who had also released a bad girl themed song that year called The Baddest Female. On April 2, 2014, SBS announced she and actress Moon So-ri would host a talk show Magic Eye. The show started filming in April. Due to low ratings, the show aired its final episode on November 18, 2014.

=== 2015–2017: Black ===
In February 2015, Lee's representatives announced that her contract with B2M Entertainment had expired in 2013. In May 2015, Lee announced that she closed her blog as well as her Twitter account. Along with shutting down her social media, she stopped all of her television activities. In October of that year, Lee's representative told media outlets that she would be taking a 2-year hiatus from her entertainment career, "in order to have time for herself." In October 2016, Lee hinted at working on new music. In November, it was confirmed that Lee had signed with Kiwi Media Group with a new album due in 2017. In December, Lee made a return to social media with posts on Instagram.

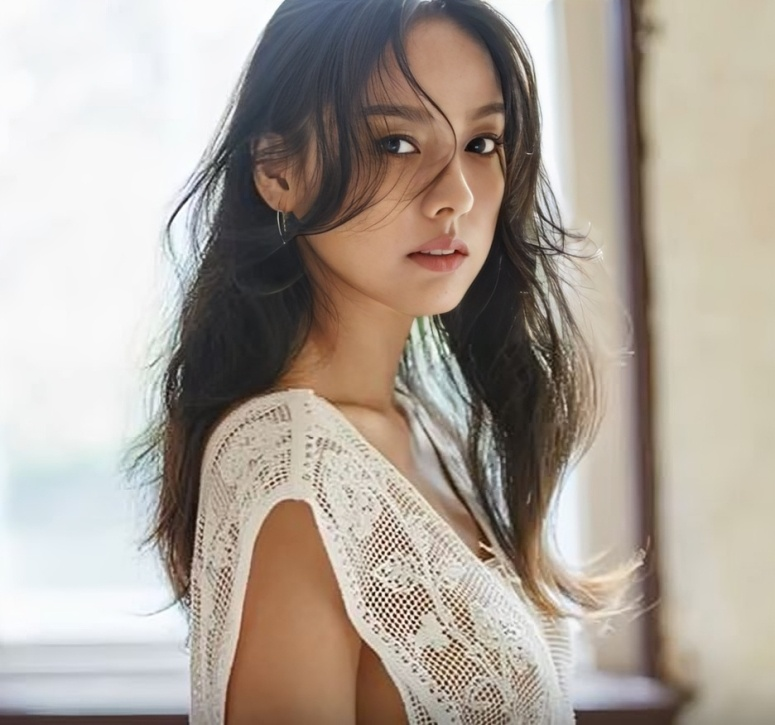
Lee in 2017

In January 2017, Kiwi Media Group's CEO Kim Hyung Suk revealed on MBC's Video Star that Lee was taking on the bulk of the responsibility for her new album as executive producer while working with him and "10 Minutes" songwriter Kim Dong Hyun. In April 2017, it was announced that Lee would be starring with her husband in a new variety show entitled Hyori's Homestay.

In June, Lee's agency confirmed her comeback for early July as she prepared to film a music video for the single. Later the same month, her agency announced that singer-songwriter Lee Juck would be featured on one of the tracks. A few days later, Lee released a teaser image and video teaser for the album's pre-release track "Seoul". The self-composed electro-R&B song was released on June 28, 2017, alongside the music video featuring the contrasting visuals of Seoul and Jeju Island. The album's tracklist was revealed along with a series of visual teasers for the album a few days before the album's release. On July 4, 2017, her sixth studio album, Black, was released alongside the rustic-themed official music video for the title track. The mature, experimental sound started with Monochrome continues as Lee wrote eight and composed nine of the ten album tracks.

=== 2017–present: Reality show, SSAK3 and Refund Sisters ===
Lee and her husband, Lee Sang-soon, turned their house in Jeju Island into a guest house to film Hyori's Homestay. In season 1, IU joins the show as an employee. In season 2, the employee position was replaced by YoonA, also in this season Park Bo-gum came to work as a temporary employee. In 2019, Lee reunited with Fin.K.L in a new reality show "Camping Club".

On May 15, 2020, Lee announced that she had signed a contract with ESteem Entertainment. Through MBC's Hangout with Yoo, she, under the stage name Linda G, founded the summer project co-ed trio named SSAK3 with Rain and Yoo Jae-suk. They released a debut single "Beach Again" on July 18, 2020 and officially debuted on July 25 with a debut stage on Music Core. SSAK3 is a special summer project, and they announced that all proceeds from their songs and promotions will be donated to communities in need. The single peaked at number one on the Gaon Digital Chart.

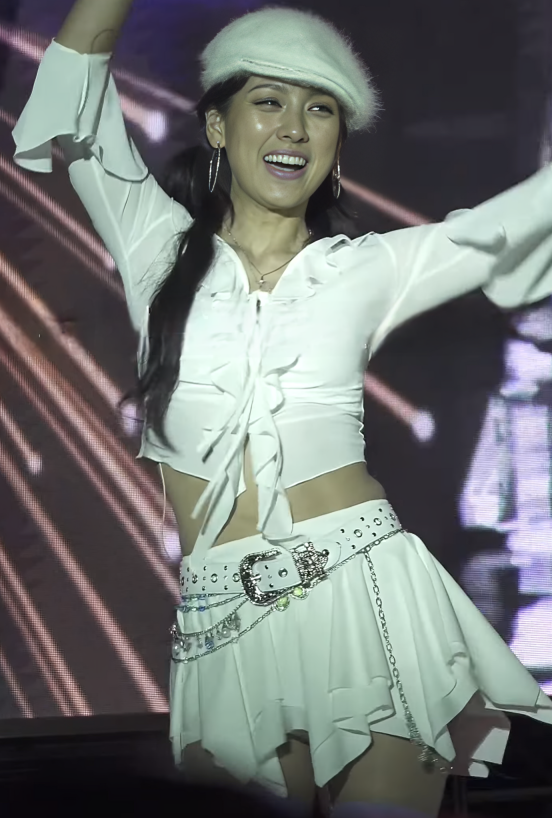
Lee at a university festival in 2023

After SSAK3 project, Hangout with Yoo programme has a spin-off from Lee naming Uhm Jung-hwa, Jessi and Hwasa as the members she wanted in her dream girl group during the SSAK3 segment. The four women formed another girl group named Refund Sisters with Yoo Jae-suk as a producer. They released a debut single "Don't Touch Me" on October 10, 2020, which also peaked at number one in South Korea.

On October 13, 2021, it was announced that Lee will be hosting the 2021 Mnet Asian Music Awards on December 11, 2021, making her the first woman to host the show solo.

In February 2023, Lee signed with Antenna. In March 2023, it was revealed that Lee would be a part of Dancing Queens on the Road, a twelve-episode television variety show aired on tvN, along with Kim Wan-sun, Uhm Jung-Hwa, BoA and Hwasa. On October 12, 2023, Lee released the single "Hoodie E Banbaji", her first in six years.

In January 2024, Lee began hosting the fourth season of the talk show The Seasons—titled The Seasons: Lee Hyori's Red Carpet. On May 7, Lee is joined by her mother in a reality show called "Mom, Will You Go on a Trip with Me?" where they go on a trip for the first time. On September 5, Antenna announced that after more than 10 years of living in Jeju, Hyori and her husband has moved to Seoul and be more active in their career.

== Artistry and image ==
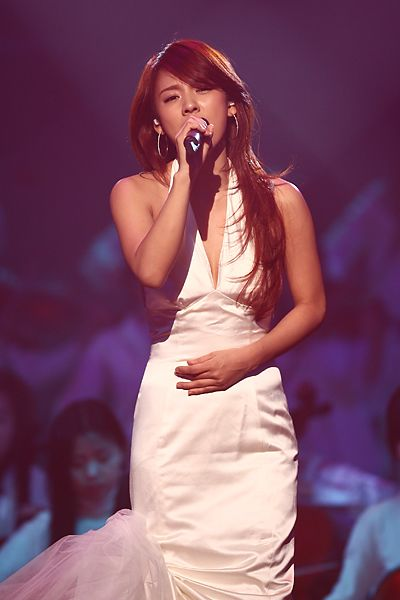
Lee performing in 2007

After the disbandment of Fin.K.L., Lee's style has been categorized as urban pop and dance-pop. With the release of H-Logic, Lee began to experiment with her sound by incorporating hip-hop into her music. Later releases have been influenced by country, blues, disco, folk and rock music. At the beginning of her solo career, Lee would sometimes write or co-write material for her albums alongside other songwriters. Later in her career, she began self-composing and producing much of her own material. Thematically, Lee's songs have ranged from love and heartbreak to empowerment to social commentary with a female perspective.

Lee's vocal range can be classified in the mezzo-soprano range. In spite of her sexy image, she has been recognized for her emotional delivery in songs like "Swing" and "Amor Mio". Lee has been criticized for her vocal ability, which she responded with "I think everyone thinks differently, so they can think so. Before, I felt like I was hiding behind the instruments. It felt uncomfortable otherwise. But starting from a point, I started liking my voice. Since I like it, it didn't really matter what other people thought." Lee has been influenced by fellow Korean singer Uhm Jung-hwa.

=== Image ===
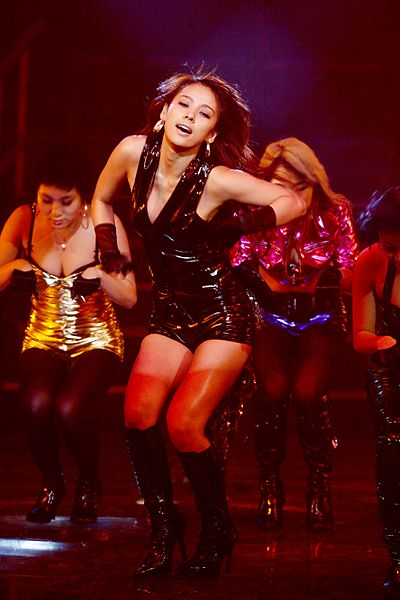
Lee is regarded as a sex symbol in South Korea.

As a member of Fin K.L, Lee became known for her sex appeal. This image has allowed Lee to lend her face and image to advertising for various company endorsement deals, and in 2005 she was chosen in a consumer survey as the female entertainer with the strongest brand power. In late 2003, Lee signed an advertising contract with Samsung, for which she would make three musical commercials and songs for their Anycall cell phones, which became some of her most prominent commercials. The first commercial and song, "Anymotion", was released in early 2005, featuring Eric Mun from Shinhwa. In early 2006, the follow-up commercial "Anyclub" featuring Teddy Park from 1TYM was released in two parts; the music video starred Eric Mun and actor Kwon Sang-woo. The songs from the commercials served as singles for Lee in between her albums. The final commercial was released in December 2006, titled "Anystar" and differed from the first two in that it featured mostly dialogue. The commercial starred actor Lee Joon-gi and YG Family trainee Park Bom (2NE1). Her contract with Samsung ended in December 2007.

For five years, Lee was the model for Lotte Liquor, making her its longest-serving endorser. According to Lotte, the market share of the company's soju brand rose from 11 to 15 percent while Lee modeled for it. Her contract ended in November 2012.

In 2007, she starred in a commercial with Jessica Alba for South Korean cosmetics company Ĭsa Knox, which was shot in Vancouver, British Columbia, Canada. Lee also modeled for cosmetics company Biotherm (her contract ended in February 2007), and Black Bean Therapy, a health drink. She then signed with KB Card, and has starred in commercials along with Rain. She was a model for Calvin Klein Jeans, modeling for the "Pure Calvin" Collection. She was also briefly featured in a 2010 Adidas commercial. Over the years, Lee has appeared in music videos for artists like Davichi and Leessang.

During an episode of Hangout with Yoo, Lee Hyori was brainstorming stage names for the project group Refund Sisters. During this conversation she said, "How about a Chinese name, since we could go global? How about 'Mao'?" In response to this, Chinese viewers of the show expressed their discontent as the name was reminiscent of Mao Zedong.

== Impact ==
Lee has appeared on the Forbes Korea Power Celebrity 40 multiple times throughout her career, including placing within the top 15 in 2009–2011. She has been cited as an inspiration or influence by numerous artists, including Kara, Blackpink's Jennie, Jeon Somi, Chungha, Jessica Jung, Dalshabet, Nada, Cherry Bullet's Jiwon, Oh My Girl's Jiho, Laboum's Solbin, Elris' Sohee, Jung Eun-chae, Jin Se-yeon, and Huh Chan-mi.

== Other activities ==
=== Activism ===
Lee has been recognized as one of South Korea's leading socialtainers for her charity work and raising her voice for social causes. She adheres to a pescetarian diet according to her personal ethics and health beliefs and is an advocate for animal welfare and animal rights. In 2012, she published Closer, a photo-essay book that focuses on her everyday life with her dog Soonshim whom Lee adopted from an animal shelter. In the book, Lee wrote her thoughts on animal rights and animal shelters, as well as her sentiments toward wearing animal fur. She has given money to shelters along with taking in stray and abused animals. Her work in animal activism has led her to interviewing Jane Goodall.

When SsangYong Motor laid off workers in December 2014, Lee gave public support of the workers via Twitter, announcing that she wanted to see the new car Tivoli sell well so they would be hired again, adding that, if it happened, she would dance in front of the car in a bikini. During the 2012 presidential elections, Lee encouraged her fans to vote through a series of tweets and re-tweets. This drew both admiration and annoyance from others on social media. In a June 2012 poll by Panelnow, Lee was listed as one of "the socialtainers that best represents Korea" alongside broadcaster Kim Je-dong, singer Kim Jang-hoon, and actress Kim Yeo-jin.

== Personal life ==
She married musician Lee Sang-soon, guitarist of rock band Roller Coaster, on September 1, 2013 at their vacation home on Mt. Halla in Jeju Island. Both of them are members of an animal rights group and began dating after they collaborated in July 2011 on a song that Lee recorded to support animal shelters. In 2021, South China Morning Post estimated her net worth to be around US$30–40 million. In 2024, Lee Hyori and her husband Lee Sang-soon moved to Pyeongchang-dong, Seoul. The detached house in Pyeongchang-dong where the couple resides is reportedly worth approximately ₩6 billion. Lee Hyori also opened a yoga studio on Yeonhui-ro in Seodaemun District, Seoul, where she meets with students.

== Discography ==
- Stylish... (2003)
- Dark Angel (2006)
- It's Hyorish (2008)
- H-Logic (2010)
- Monochrome (2013)
- Black (2017)

== Concerts and tours ==
- The First Concert: Lee Hyori the Invincible (2008)

== Filmography ==
=== Television ===
Year	Title	Role	Notes
1997	The Generation of Sensibility	One of the disorderly students	Pre-debut
2001–2003	Happy Together	Host	
2002–2003	Time Machine	Host	
2003	Fort Boyard	Host	
2005	Three Leaf Clover	Kang Jin-a	
2006–2007	Happy Together Friends	Host	
2007	If in Love... Like Them	Lee Na	
2008	Off the Record: Lee Hyori	Main cast	Reality show
2008	On Air	Herself	Cameo role (Episode 1)
2008	Sang Sang Plus	Host	
2008	Change	Host	
2008–2010	Family Outing	Main cast	
2009	Superstar K	Judge	
2012	Jung Jae-hyung & Lee Hyori's You and I	Host	
2012	Golden 12	Herself	Reality show
2012	Reply 1997	Herself	Cameo appearance through archive footage (Episode 12)
2013	2HYORI SHOW	Herself	Comeback special for Monochrome
2013	Lee Hyori's X Sister	Main cast	Reality show
2013	Korea's Next Top Model	Special Judge	
2013	Our Sole Earth	Herself	Featured with Lee Sang-soon (Episode "Instant Wedding")
2014	Magic Eye	Host	
2014	Our Sole Earth	Interviewee	Episode "Your Winter Coat, Alpaca and Raccoon"
2015	Take Care of My Dad	Narrator	Voice only
2017	Hyori's Homestay	Main cast	Reality show
2018	Hyori's Homestay 2	Main cast	Reality show
2019	Camping Club	Main cast	Reality show
2020	Hangout with Yoo	Regular cast	Episode 42, 45–56 (SSAK3 (Linda G)); Episode 57–69 (Refund Sisters (Cheon Ok))
2020	Face ID	Host	Episode 1–7
2021	The Hungry and the Hairy	Herself	Episode 1, 10
2022	Canada Check-in	Cast	
2023	Dancing Queens on the Road	Cast Member	
2024	The Seasons: Lee Hyori's Red Carpet	Host	Season 4 host
2024	Mom, Will You Go on a Trip with Me?	Herself	Reality show
2026	Mongle Counseling Center	Main cast	with husband Lee Sang-soon

=== Web shows ===
Year	Title	Role	Ref.
2022	Seoul Check-in	Cast	

=== Film ===
Year	Title	Role	Notes
2002	Emergency Act 19	Herself (as a member of Fin.K.L)	Cameo
2012	Dancing Queen	Superstar K judge	Cameo
2018	The Spy Gone North	Herself	Cameo
2022	A Glimpse at Lee Hyori	Lee Hyori	TVING Short Film

=== Hosting ===
Year	Title	Ref.
2021	2021 Mnet Asian Music Awards	

=== Video games ===
Year	Title	Role	Notes
2000	Tony Hawk's Pro Skater 2	Herself	South Korean PC version

== Bibliography ==
- Lee Hyori (2012). 가까이 – 효리와 순심이가 시작하는 이야기 [Closer – The Story Begun by Hyori and Soonshim] (in Korean). Bookhouse. ISBN 978-89-56-05594-7.

== Awards and nominations ==
Awards and achievements
Preceded by BoA	14th Seoul Music Awards – Daesang Award; 2003	Succeeded by Shinhwa
Preceded by Jang Na-ra	KBS Song Festival – Daesang Award; 2003	Succeeded by Rain
Preceded by Ivy	10th Mnet Asian Music Awards – Best Female Solo Artist; 2008	Succeeded by Baek Ji-young
Preceded by Lee Min-woo	10th Mnet Asian Music Awards – Best Dance Music; 2008	Succeeded by Rain
