= No Brain =

South Korean punk rock band

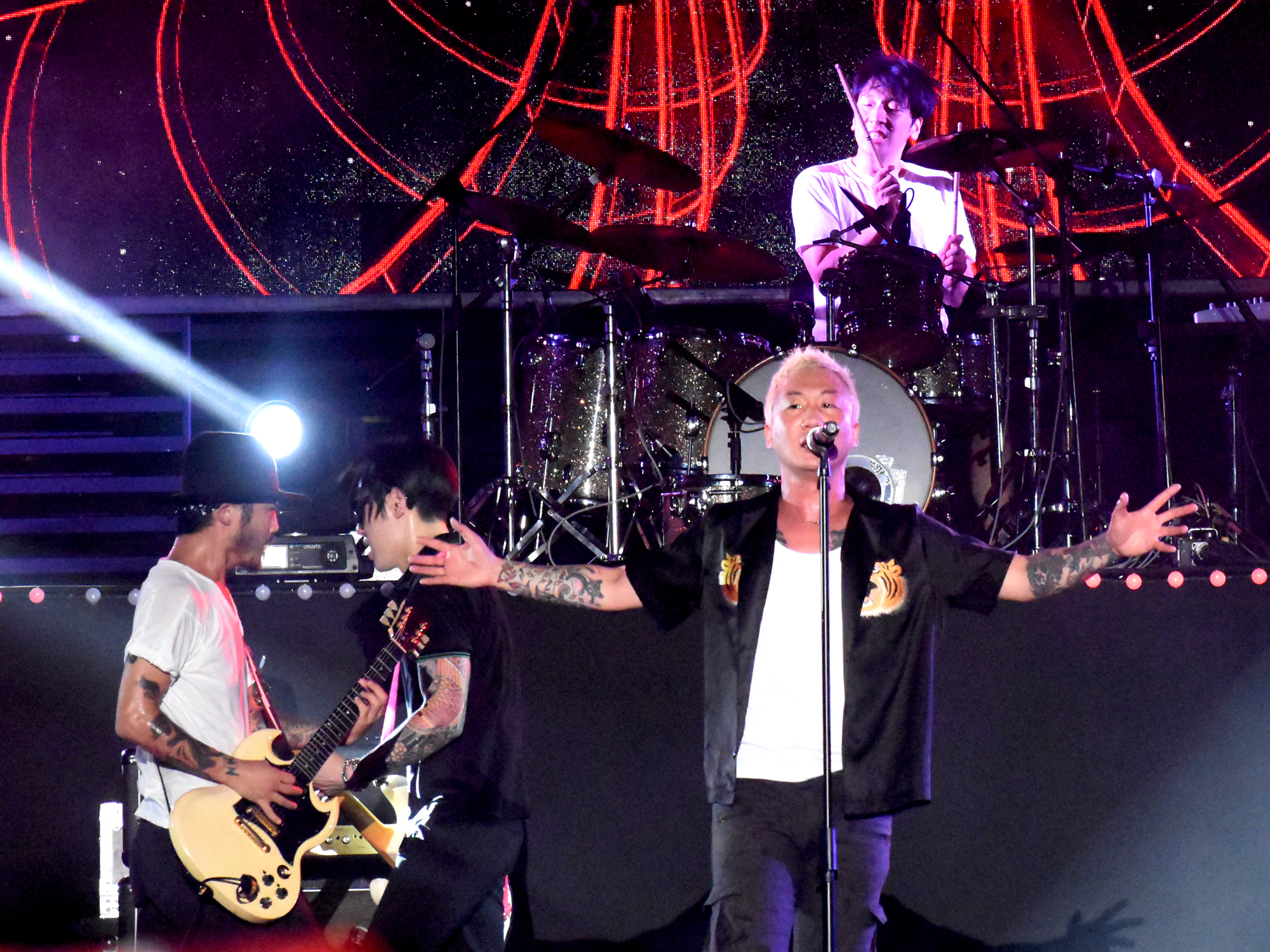
- No Brain at the Busan Sea Festival, August 2018

Background information
- Origin: Seoul, South Korea
- Genre: Punk rock
- Years active: 1997–present
- Labels: Drug Records, Munhwa Sagidan, Cujo, Sire Records
- Members: Bulldaegal; VOVO; BBogle; Hyoonga
- Past members: Cha Seung-woo
- Website: http://nobrainpunk.com

No Brain (Korean: 노브레인; Hanja: 怒브레인; lit. 'Angry Brain') is a South Korean punk rock band widely considered one of the godfathers of the Korean punk scene. Originally part of Korea's homegrown underground punk movement, known as Chosun Punk, in recent years the group has enjoyed mainstream success both with their music and their emerging acting and hosting careers. Their name comes from their desire for concert-goers to leave their rational minds at the venue doors.

== History ==
The group formed in 1996 in a small club in Hongdae (an artistic district of Seoul). They are part of the first generation of indie bands in Korea, along with Crying Nut. Their first album, Our Nation Volume 2, was a split album with the group Weeper. They also contributed a cover of "Lithium" to the Nirvana tribute album Smells Like Nirvana, and several tracks to the Korean punk compilation Here We Stand.

In 1999, they left Drug Records, establishing their own label, Munwha Sagidan. They only printed 5000 copies of their first release, the EP Youth 98, and all were sold out.

In 2000, bassist Jeong Jaehwan left the group in order to carry out his mandatory military service, but the group pressed on without him. The same year, the band dubbed itself the anti-Seo Taiji band and held a live event to commemorate the occasion.

April 2001 found the group releasing a song-for-song cover of the Sex Pistols album Never Mind The Bollocks Here's The Sex Pistols, dubbed Never Mind The Sex Pistols Here's The No Brain. Several months later, the group released the album Viva No Brain. The group then performed at the 2001 Fuji Rock Festival in Japan. The group created something of international incident when Lee Sung Woo, the lead singer of the group, ripped up the Rising Sun Flag while singing the Korean national anthem, in order to criticize the distortion of history on war crimes of the Japanese Empire inside Japanese history textbooks.

The band contributed a track to the Red Devils 2002 World Cup album. The band also embarked on a national club tour in Korea and a tour of Japan. That same year, Cha Seung-woo left the group. The group recruited Jeong Minjun, formerly of the bands Real Sshang Noms and Samchung, and recorded the album Goodbye, Mary Poppins which was released in June 2003. This 3rd album was a big change and challenge for No Brain, beginning the band's second era. Overall, this album was a turning point for the band.

In 2006 they appeared in the film Radio Star, portraying a garage band named East River.

In 2007, No Brain sold the rights to their song "넌 내게 반했어" (You have a crush on me) to be used by the presidential campaign for Lee Myung-bak with the substituted title "이번엔 이명박" (This time Lee Myung-bak). Although No Brain did not endorse Lee's presidential campaign, they faced much backlash from fans. The reaction was especially exasperated due to the fact that, in 2005, Lee – at the time the Mayor of Seoul – had previously called for a blacklist of independent musicians.

In 2013, No Brain performed at SXSW. They toured North America as part of the Seoulsonic 2K13 tour funded by KOCCA alongside Goonam and Lowdown 30, performing in Rhode Island, New York, and California, as well as Toronto, Canada for Canadian Music Week (CMW). Their performance at CMW was seen by record producer Seymour Stein. Surprised by his interest, the band invited him to their next performance in Brooklyn. The show was delayed for two hours, and the 71-year-old Stein fell asleep, only to be woken up when their performance began. No Brain signed a recording contract with Stein to release an album on Sire Records. Stein visited No Brain in Korea for the Seoul International Music Fair (Mu:Con). The album, produced by Julian Raymond, is set to be their first English album.

The same year, No Brain also headlined the V-Rox Festival in Vladivostok, Russia.

== Band members ==
- Bulldaegal (이성우; Lee Sung-woo) – vocals
- VOVO (정민준; Jeong Min-jun) – guitar
- BBogle (정우용; Jeong Woo-yong) – bass guitar
- Hyoonga (황현성; Hwang Hyun-seong) – drums

== Awards and honors ==
- 2008 Korean Music Awards - Netizens Choice: Rock Artist of the Year
- 2007 Korean Music Awards - Band of the Year
- 2007 Korean Music Awards - Rock Song of the Year - Nominee
- 2005 Ministry of Patriots and Veterans Affairs - Culture Award
- 2001 Mnet Asian Music Awards Professional Judges Special
- Nominated: 2001 Mnet Asian Music Awards - Best Indie Performance - "Go To The Beach" (해변으로 가요)
- Nominated: 2000 Mnet Asian Music Awards - Best Indie Performance - "Songs for the Rioters" (청년폭도맹진가)
- 1999 MTV International Viewer's Choice Award - Korea - Nominee

== Discography ==
- Here We Stand (Asian punk compilation) 1997, All System Fail
- Smells Like Nirvana 1997, Drug Records
- Our Nation 2 1998, Drug Records split with Weeper
- Youth 98 1999, Munwha Sagidan
- Songs for the Rioters 2000, Cujo/Munwha Sagidan/Pony Canyon Korea
- Never Mind the Sex Pistols. Here's the No Brain 2001, Cujo, Munwha Sagidan
- Viva No Brain 2001, Cujo/Munwha Sagidan
- Christmas Punk compilation, 2001, Cujo/Munwha Sagidan
- Munwha Sagidan Compilation 2002, Cujo/Munwha Sagidan
- Dreams Come True, compilation with Crying Nut, YB, etc. 2002, Red Devils/Jave
- The Blue Hearts Super Tribute tribute compilation to Japanese band The Blue Hearts
- Goodbye, Mary Poppins 2003, Cujo
- Stand Up Again 2004, Rockstar Music
- Songs to be sung again 2005, Egg Music/Ministry of Patriots' & Veterans' Affairs
- Boys, Be Ambitious 2005, Rockstar Music
- Shout out, Korea! 2005, Rockstar Music
- That is Youth 2007, Rockstar Music
- Dragon Fighter 2007, Rockstar Music for the TV show Seoul Martial Arts
- Absolutely Summer 2009, Rockstar Music
- We Wish You a Merry Christmas digital single, 2009, Rockstar Music
- Soldiers of Korea single for World Cup 2010, Rockstar Music
- High Tension 2011, Rockstar Music
- Super High Tension, 2013, Roxtamuzik & Live
- 96 [2014], split album with Crying Nut
- Brainless 2016, Roxtamuzik & Live
- 20, 20th Anniversary, 2016, Roxtamuzik & Live
- 직진, 2019, Roxtamuzik & Live
