= 7th Issue =

Studio album by Seo Taiji
- Released: January 27, 2004
- Recorded: Sound City
- Genres: Pop punk, alternative rock, post-hardcore, emo, nu metal
- Length: 33:35
- Label: Seo Taiji Company
- Producer: Seo Taiji

Seo Taiji chronology
Ultramania (2000)	7th Issue (2004)	Atomos (2009)

7th Issue is the third studio album by the Korean musician Seo Taiji and his seventh counting the four albums released by Seo Taiji and Boys. The album was a commercial success as the best-selling album of the year in South Korea, with 482,066 copies sold, it did not reach the heights of his previous two. "Live Wire" won the 2004 Mnet Asian Music Award for Best Rock Performance.

== Background ==
Seo explained that because he is curious and wants to try many styles of music, the style on 7th Issue is "sensitive-core, which is hardcore that stresses the melodies. I wanted to bring out the sensitive side, and in particular, I expressed people's pain". The songs touch on social issues, such as sexual discrimination, the music industry and stalkers.

Instead of performing every instrument himself like he did on his previous two albums, Seo the enlisted Japanese musicians J (Luna Sea), K.A.Z and I.N.A (both from hide with Spread Beaver) to contribute to the album among others. The guitarist Top and the drummer Heff Holter continued as part of his backing band for several years. Strings on the song "0 (Zero)" were arranged and conducted by Takayuki Hattori (Face Music). Many of Seo's fans have noted that the whole CD sounds like one very long song. This is because most of the songs are written in dropped C tuning with similar chord structures.

== Songs ==
"Heffy End" is essentially a sad love song where a woman obsessively stalks and confines her lover. Although the title might indicate a bit of irony, and Seo justifies their deviated love from the norm by using purposely misspelled "Heffy". Also of note is that the name of the album's drummer is Heff Holter.

"Nothing" begins with a man's voice mocking about women's rights in Korea. The voice comments that sexism is becoming an issue because of such things as women rights campaigns, but he disagrees with the efforts that women put it that women are placed at higher level than men in (Korean) society. However, Seo has put this as sarcasm, or to reflect what most men are thinking in South Korea.

"Victim" is a song about female discrimination. The song caused controversy, being banned by the Munhwa Broadcasting Corporation.

"Live Wire" is a song celebrating musical freedom. Seo hails to his fans "You feel me? Here I come to show you love", referring to his steadfast devotion to music. The lyrics contain many poetic devices; the overall motif is the feeling of rock.

"Robot" tells a story about a boy, or Seo himself, who is destroyed by the cruelty that exists in the current overly digitalized society. After he has stopped checking his height on the doorway with his mother, he feels that his emotions are gone and can only think "illogically"; where the metaphor "logical" Seo's view is things that are emotional and analogical, as his fans can easily catch from his previous works.

"October 4th" represents a shift in his usual heavy-metal style. Expressed in numerical form, the date October 4 could be written as 10–04. Without the hyphen, this becomes the number 1004, or, in Korean: "천사" (chun-sa, where chun is thousand and sa is four); that spelling and pronunciation of 1,004 (천사) is identical to the Korean word meaning "angel." The song is lightly driven by two guitars, one playing chords at complex rhythms and the other plays a repetitive (yet catchy) melody line. It later makes a transition into a full ensemble with heavy percussion and a bass guitar. The pensive lyrics tell the story of a man whose mind is flooded with memories of a lost love. He still regrets having lost her but acknowledges that she is "like a fox" (in the Korean culture, someone who is like a fox is sly and deceitful). In the end, he enjoys holding on to the memories and watches his former lover from afar, commenting how she's more beautiful than ever.

The title "F.M Business" stands for "Fucked up Music Business" as the lyric suggests. The song "lampoons Korea's highly commercial music industry" and Seo's "frustration with having to return to a dirty business that he left because of his doubts about it."

Seo makes various accusations regarding the current direction Korean pop music is heading. In the early 1990s, Seo introduced the concept of "American" music, such as hip-hop and rock. His ideology makes him detest the current trend in the Korean music scene. According to Seo, idol groups (aka "boybands") were born for the sole purpose of making profit out of music. While he admits making the same mistake in the past, he is more concerned with asking musicians to take a look at themselves ("You and me... why are we face to face here? For the selling my soul & music? For the making of money?").

"0" is a symphonic rock piece that spans five minutes and thirty seconds, the longest song on the album. Unlike the other songs, which follow a simple formula with guitar chords and a memorable melody line, 0 (Zero) consists of a noticeably more complex composition. A demanding song that showcases Seo's mastery of music-writing as well as endurance when performed live, it features distortion guitars as well as clean guitar riffs during the vocals and harmonizing part. Strings were arranged by Takayuki Hattori of Face Music.

== Reception ==
Professional ratings
Review scores
Source	Rating
AllMusic	link

7th Issue was a commercial success, selling 482,066 copies. Although South Korea's best-selling album of the year, it did not match the heights of Seo's previous two.

"Live Wire" won the 2004 Mnet Asian Music Award for Best Rock Performance.

== Track listing ==
All tracks are written by Seo Taiji.

No.	Title	Length
1.	"Intro"	1:01
2.	"Heffy End"	3:22
3.	"Nothing"	0:17
4.	"Victim"	3:30
5.	"DB"	0:36
6.	"Live Wire"	3:53
7.	"Robot" (로보트)	5:01
8.	"Down"	0:24
9.	"October 4" (10월 4일)	3:43
10.	"F.M Business"	4:02
11.	"0 (Zero)"	5:31
12.	"Outro"	2:09

15th Anniversary Edition (2007)/ Remaster (2009)
No.	Title	Length
13.	"Watchout"	3:16
14.	"Intro: For Zero Tour ('04 Zero Live)"	1:04
15.	"F.M Business ('04 Zero Live)"	4:19
16.	"Victim ('04 Zero Live)"	4:01
17.	"Heffy End ('04 Zero Live)"	3:23
18.	"Robot ('04 Zero Live)" (로보트 ('04 Zero Live))	5:30
19.	"October 4 ('04 Zero Live)" (10월 4일 ('04 Zero Live))	3:58
20.	"Live Wire ('04 Zero Live)"	4:31
21.	"Zero ('04 Zero Live)"	5:36
22.	"Outro ('04 Zero Live)"	2:26

== Personnel ==
- Seo Taiji − vocals, guitar, bass guitar, arrangement, computer programming, digital editing, mixing, producing, executive producing
- Top − guitar, arrangement
- K.A.Z − guitar
- J − bass guitar on "Robot"
- Heff Holter − drums
- I.N.A − arrangement, computer programming, digital editing
- Takayuki Hattori − string arrangement and conducting on "0 (Zero)"
- Josh Wilbur − recording, mixing
- Teruaki Kitagawa − string recording
- Eric Westfall − guitar reamped
