= Ultramania =

Studio album by Seo Taiji
- Released: September 8, 2000
- Genres: Nu metal, rap metal
- Length: 31:51
- Label: Bando Eumban
- Producer: Seo Taiji

Seo Taiji chronology
Seo Tai Ji (1998)	Ultramania (2000)	7th Issue (2004)

Ultramania is the second studio album by Korean musician Seo Taiji. Although it is the second solo album by Seo, some refer to it as his sixth counting the four albums released by Seo Taiji and Boys. The album, with its nu metal sound, has sold over a million copies, making it one of the best-selling albums in South Korea. Ultramania spawned three number-one singles, "Ultramania", "Feel the Soul" and "Internet War".

A remaster was released in 2009 with upgraded audio clarity, although the skits ("Lego", "Plagiarism", "Item") have been cut on the Reissue

In 2025, Graham Hartmann of Metal Injection included the album in his list of "10 Extremely Underrated Metal Albums From The 2000s".

== Background ==
Ultramania saw Seo Taiji resume musical activities in Korea for the first time since his retirement and the end of Seo Taiji and Boys in January 1996. Although he released Seo Tai Ji in 1998, he remained hidden and stayed in the United States. On his decision to end retirement and the fear of public opinion on his return, Seo said he thought it over many times and that it was not an easy decision to make. Awaiting his return, over a thousand fans waited at Kimpo International Airport in August 2000, with 900 policemen dispatched to control the chaos.

Seo held his "comeback" concert on September 9, 2000, at the Fencing Stadium within the Olympic Park to 6,000 fans. The album was released just one day earlier, with wholesalers estimating 800,000 to 900,000 copies sold in just two days.

He released the album's first single, "Ultramania", which quickly went to number one on the music charts. "Internet War" was soon to follow, also hitting number one. The final song on the album includes a hidden track; a rock version of "Neoege" originally from Seo Taiji and Boys' second album.

Most songs from Ultramania were re-recorded and released on the 2003 6th Album Re-recording & ETPFEST Live compilation.

== Reception ==
Ultramania sold over 1.4 million copies. After Seo signed a deal to exclusively appear on Seoul Broadcasting System, its competitors Korean Broadcasting System and Munhwa Broadcasting Corporation left the musician off their music charts.

In 2000, the song "Ultramania" won the Mnet Asian Music Award for Best Band Performance.

Music critic Im Jin-mo said "Seo's new music is much more aggressive than before. It even shows signs of arrogance. It doesn't meet the traditional standard of popularity and commercialism. In a way, he seems to be making an 'independence declaration at a personal level."

== Track listing ==
All tracks are written by Seo Taiji.

No.	Title	Length
1.	"Item" (아이템)	0:38
2.	"Tank" (탱크)	4:10
3.	"Orange" (오렌지)	3:53
4.	"Internet War" (인터넷 전쟁)	4:41
5.	"Plagiarism" (표절)	0:28
6.	"Feel the Soul" (대경성)	4:10
7.	"Lego" (레고)	0:44
8.	"Ultramania" (울트라맨이야)	3:25
9.	"Do You Remember?" (ㄱ나니)	4:58
10.	"To You (Hidden Track)" (너에게)	1:41
Total length:		31:51

Remastered/Reissue 2009
No.	Title	Length
1.	"Orange"	3:52
2.	"Internet War"	4:37
3.	"Feel The Soul"	3:59
4.	"Ultramania"	3:26
5.	"Do You Remember"	4:49
6.	"Tank"	4:12
7.	"To You ('02 Remake)" ([Re-Recorded Version])	2:10
8.	"Come Back Home ('02 Remake)" (Featuring [Uncredited] Masta Wu)	4:43
9.	"Ultramania (Live 2001)"	4:28
10.	"Internet War (Live 2004)"	4:43
11.	"Feel The Soul (2003 Remix)"	4:14
12.	"Internet War (2003 Remix)"	4:58
Total length:		49:52

== Personnel ==
- Seo Taiji - vocals, all instruments, recording, producing
- DJ Babu - scratching
- Jason Robert - recording, mixing
