= Brown Eyes (band) =

South Korean singing duo

- Origin: South Korea
- Genres: K-pop, R&B
- Instrument: Vocals
- Years active: 2001–2002, 2008; 2019-present
- Members: Yoon Gun; Naul

Brown Eyes (Korean: 브라운아이즈) was a South Korean singing duo that debuted in 2001. They are considered one of South Korea's most important R&B groups, given their immense commercial success.

== History ==
Despite having no television appearances, Brown Eyes managed to have record sales of 640,000 and 618,026 for their first and second albums, respectively.

In May 2002, Brown Eyes performed the Korean version of the Official Anthem along with Lena Park for the 2002 FIFA World Cup held in South Korea and Japan.

In the midst of their popularity, Brown Eyes announced their official disbandment in April 2003. However, after five years, they got back together for a third album Two Things Needed For The Same Purpose And 5 Objects in 2008.

== Members ==
=== Yoon Gun ===
After leaving Brown Eyes in 2003, Yoon Gun went solo and released a self-titled album that same year. Yoon Gun has also branched out to do collaborations with artists such as Seohyun of Girls' Generation and Hyori. In 2012, Yoon Gun joined Sony Music and released his solo album "Far East 2 Bricklane" on October 18. He replaced PSY as a judge on the 4th season of Superstar K as PSY was unable to continue due to promotional activities abroad.

=== Naul ===
In 2003 after the disbandment of Brown Eyes, Naul formed a separate group Brown Eyed Soul with three other members Jungyup, Young Jun, and Sang Hoon.

== Discography ==
=== Studio albums ===
Title	Album details	Peak chart positions	Sales
Title	Album details	KOR	Sales
Brown Eyes	Released: June 7, 2001; Label: Stone Music Entertainment; Format: CD, cassette; Track listing: 1. Intro; 2. 벌써 일년; 3. Love Is Over (feat. Seo Jeong-hwan); 4. 너에게 들려 주고싶은 두 번째 이야기; 5. 그녀가 나를 보네 (feat. Hwayobi); 6. With Coffee; 7. Piano Nocturn (벌써 일년); 8. 희망; 9. Blues Guitar; 10. 하얀나비; 11. 언제나 그랬죠; 12. Brown City; 13. No Day But Today; 14. Song Of The Rain (feat. Tommy Kim); 15. 벌써 일년 (Inst.); 16. 그녀가 나를 보네 (Inst.)	3	KOR: 710,359
Reason 4 Breathing?	Releases: November 26, 2002; Label: Stone Music Entertainment; Format: CD, cassette; Track listing: 1. Intro; 2. 점점; 3. 비오는 압구정; 4. 떠나지마; 5. Brown City 2; 6. 사랑 (I Wanna Fall In Love With You); 7. Piano Cavationa (점점); 8. True Luv; 9. For You; 10. 환상; 11. 그래도 되겠니; 12. Interlude; 13. Miss You...; 14. ...오후; 15. 이별송; 16. 점점 (Inst.); 17. For You (Inst.)	1	KOR: 763,898
Two Things Needed for the Same Purpose and 5 Objects	Released: June 19, 2008; Label: Stone Music Entertainment; Format: CD; Track listing: 1. Your Eyes; 2. 가지마 가지마; 3. Like A Flame; 4. 이 순간 이대로; 5. 너 때문에; 6. Let's Get Down; 7. Summer Passion; 8. Piano Nocturn (가지마 가지마); 9. Don't You Worry; 10. 사랑을 말해요; 11. Let It Go; 12. 한걸음; 13. 루아흐; 14. 가지마 가지마 (Inst.)	6	KOR: 100,406

== Awards ==
=== Mnet Asian Music Awards ===
Year	Category	Work	Result
2001	Best New Group	Brown Eyes	Won
2008	Album of the Year	Two Things Needed For The Same Purpose And 5 Objects	Nominated
2008	Best Ballad/R&B Performance	"Don't Go Don't Go"	Won
