= ETPFEST =

2001–2009 South Korean music festival

ETP Festival
- Genre: Rock, Alternative rock, Indie rock, Dance, World music, Punk rock, Electronic music, Folk music.
- Dates: August 15, 2009
- Locations: Seoul, South Korea
- Years active: 2001 - (suspended)
- Founders: Seo Tai Ji
- Website: www.etpfest.com

ETP Fest or ETP Festival was one of the biggest rock music festivals in South Korea founded by rock singer Seo Taiji. ETP stands for Eerie Taiji People.

== Performances ==
=== 2001 ===
The first ETPfest's line up included Seo Tai Ji band.

=== 2002 ===
The line up included Seo Tai Ji band and Tommy Lee of Mötley Crüe.

=== 2004 ===
The line up included Seo Tai Ji band, Hoobastank, Zebrahead, PE'Z, and Pia.

=== 2008 ===
Friday, August 14	Saturday, August 15
Clazziquai Project; Crying Nut; Daishi Dance; Dr. Core 911; Epik High; Schizo; Shinichi Osawa (Mondo Grosso); Sugar Donut; Sunday Brunch; Swimmin Fish; Transfixion	Death Cab For Cutie; Diablo (Korean band); Dragon Ash; Marilyn Manson; Maximum The Hormone; Monkey Majik; Pia; Seo Tai Ji; The Used; Vanilla Unity; Yamaarashi

=== 2009 ===
The line up included : Nine Inch Nails, Limp Bizkit, Keane, Seo Tai Ji (via band website), GUMX, Pia, Boom Boom Satellites and Fade.

== See also ==
- List of music festivals in South Korea
