= Jaurim =

South Korean alternative rock band

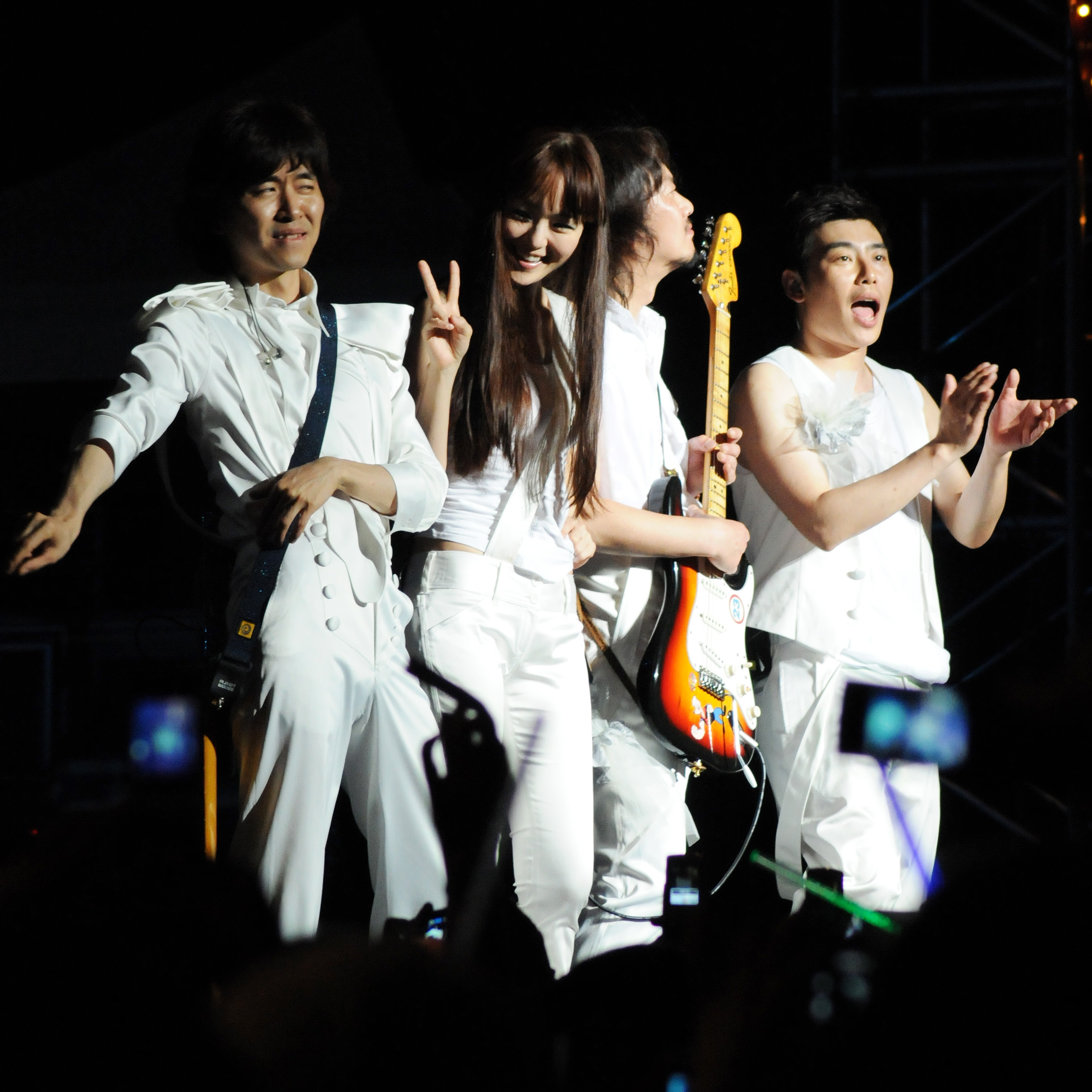

Background information
- Origin: Seoul, South Korea
- Genre: Alternative rock
- Years active: 1997–present
- Labels: Sound Holic, Interpark Music
- Members: Kim Yoon-ah; Kim Jin-man; Lee Sun-kyu
- Past members: Goo Tae-hoon
- Website: www.jaurim.com

Jaurim (Korean: 자우림; Hanja: 紫雨林 meaning "Purple Rainforest") is a rock band from Seoul, South Korea. They had performed in the indie scene in 1993. The band's initial name was Full Count. They changed the band's name to Jaurim in 1997 and became major with their first released single 'Hey Hey Hey' (an original soundtrack of 꽃을 든 남자, A Man who is holding Flowers). They have released ten full-length albums, three unofficial albums, two original soundtrack singles, one original soundtrack EP (which was released as a digital single), and one concert album. Their ninth full-length album, 'Goodbye, Grief' (part of their "25 Waiting for 21 Project"), was released on October 14, 2013. The band is praised for their arrangements, and their singer, Kim Yoon-ah, is often praised for her singing abilities and lyrics.

Their drummer, Goo Tae-hoon, has run a major live club in Korea, 'Soundholic', since 2003; as well as the record label of the same name. In 2017, their twentieth year, Goo Tae-hoon announced his departure from the band, though whether it is an ultimate withdrawal or temporary hiatus is unknown.

== Members ==
- Kim Yuna (김윤아) – vocal, guitar, keyboard, songwriter
- Kim Jin-man (김진만) – bass, guitar
- Lee Sun-kyu (이선규) – guitar, vocals

=== Former members ===
- Goo Tae-hoon (구태훈) – drums, percussion

== Discography ==
=== Studio albums ===
Title	Album details	Peak chart positions	Sales
Title	Album details	KOR	Sales
Korean
Purple Heart	Released: November 22, 1997; Label: Nanjang Music; Format: CD, cassette; Track listing: 1. 밀랍천사; 2. 파애; 3. 일탈; 4. 욕 5. 격주 코믹스; 6. 안녕, 미미; 7. 애인 발견!!!; 8. 이틀 전에 죽은 그녀와의 채팅은; 9. 어른 아이; 10. 마론인형; 11. 예뻐; 12. Violent Violet	No data	No data
Lover (戀人)(연인)	Released: November 20, 1998; Label: DMR, Saehan Media; Format: CD, cassette; Track listing: 1. 연인 (戀人) 3/3; 2. 미안해 널 미워해; 3. 김가만세 (金家萬歲); 4. 낙화 (落花); 5. 연인 (戀人) 2/3 (Lover); 6. 동두천 Charlie; 7. 이런데서 주무시면 얼어죽어요; 8. 그래, 제길, 나 이렇게 살았어; 9. 숨은그림찾기; 10. 연인 (戀人) 1/3 (Queen); 11. 하늘로 가는 상자; 12. 아파; 13. 알아; 14. 연인 (戀人) 3/3 (Angel)	18	KOR: 146,245+
B-Sides (B定規作業)(비정규작업)	Released: October 27, 1999; Label: Nanjang Music; Format: CD, cassette	13	KOR: 80,655+
The Wonderland	Released: July 4, 2000; Label: Nanjang Music, Dreambeat; Format: CD, cassette; Track listing: 1. 미쓰코리아; 2. 매직 카펫 라이드; 3. 뱀 4. 새 5. 오렌지 마말레이드; 6. Summerday Blues; 7. www.사이버디지탈.com 8. 꿈의 택배편; 9. 벌레; 10. 그녀와 단둘이; 11. 적루 (赤淚); 12. 마왕	48	KOR: 205,856+
04	Released: September 6, 2002; Label: Nanjang Music; Format: CD, cassette; Track listing: 1. #1; 2. 우리를 위해 기도해 주세요; 3. Hey Guyz; 4. Vlad; 5. Good Morning; 6. 벨벳소로우; 7. 팬이야; 8. 르샤마지끄; 9. 수사반장; 10. only one 11. 望鄕(망향); 12. 無言歌(무언가); 13. 11	20	KOR: 176,547+
All You Need is Love	Released: October 16, 2004; Label: T Entertainment; Format: CD, cassette; Track listing: 1. Luv Pill; 2. 하하하쏭; 3. 사랑의 병원으로 놀러 오세요; 4. I Saw Him; 5. 거지; 6. 曠野; 7. 우리에게 내일은 없다; 8. 惡夢; 9. 실리콘밸리; 10. 파트너; 11. 17171771; 12. Social Life; 13. Truth	5	KOR: 98,426+
Ode to Youth (靑春禮瓚)	Released: October 1, 2005; Label: T Entertainment; Format: CD, cassette; Track listing: 1. Another Day In Paradise; 2. Girl, You'll Be A Woman Soon; 3. Starman; 4. Angel; 5. Take A Bow; 6. Social Life; 7. 누구라도 그러하듯이; 8. Gloomy Sunday; 9. Penny Royal Tea; 10. Lover's Rock; 11. Summertime; 12. Even Flow; 13. 새 14. Goodbye To Romance; 15. 청춘예찬(靑春倪瓚)	5	KOR: 33,809+
Ashes to Ashes	Released: October 20, 2006; Label: T Entertainment; Format: CD, cassette; Track listing: 1. Seoul Blues; 2. Loving Memory; 3. Jester Song; 4. You and Me; 5. Summer Slumber; 6. 죽은 자들의 무도회; 7. Beautiful Girl; 8. Over And Over Again I Think Of You; 9. 6월 이야기; 10. 위로; 11. Old Man; 12. Blue Devils; 13. Good Boy; 14. OH, MAMA!; 15. 샤이닝	8	KOR: 27,367+
Ruby Sapphire Diamond	Released: June 9, 2008; Label: Mnet Media; Format: CD; Track listing: 1. Oh, Honey!; 2. 幸福한 王子; 3. Something Good; 4. Drops; 5. 20세기 소년소녀; 6. 반딧불; 7. Carnival Amour; 8. Love Rock'n Roll; 9. 27; 10. 옛날; 11. The Devil; 12. Poor Tom; 13. Blue Marble	5	KOR: 26,117+
Conspiracy Theory (陰謀論)(음모론)	Released: August 18, 2011; Label: Soundholic Entertainment; Format: CD, digital download; Track listing: 1. HAPPY DAY; 2. IDOL; 3. EV1; 4. 꿈에; 5. PEEP SHOW; 6. RED RAIN; 7. 혼자가 아니야; 8. 답답; 9. from:me@iwaswrong.com to:you@aremy.net 10. 피터의 노래; 11. Snowdrop	—	—N/a
Goodbye, Grief	Released: October 14, 2013; Label: Soundholic Entertainment; Format: CD, digital download; Track listing: 1. Anna; 2. Dear Mother; 3. 님아; 4. 템퍼스트; 5. I Feel Good; 6. 스물다섯, 스물하나; 7. 무지개; 8. Dancing Star; 9. 전하고 싶은 말 10. 이카루스; 11. 슬픔이여 이제 안녕	3	KOR: 17,831+
Jaurim	Released: June 22, 2018; Label: Interpark Entertainment; Format: CD, digital download; Track listing: 1. 狂犬時代; 2. 아는 아이; 3. Sleeping Beauty; 4. 있지; 5. 영원히 영원히; 6. Give Me One Reason; 7. Psycho Heaven; 8. Other One’s Eye; 9. Over the Rainbow; 10. XOXO	17	KOR: 3,682+
Love Forever	Released: November 26, 2021; Label: Interpark Entertainment; Format: CD, digital download	56	
Life!	Released: November 9, 2025; Label: Interpark Entertainment; Format: CD, digital download; Track listing: 1. Life!; 2. My Girl; 3. Vampire; 4. Karma; 5. Stars; 6. Let It Die; 7. Jugend; 8. Athena; 9. Bacchus; 10. Coaltar Heart	69	KOR: 1,153
Japanese
#1	Released: June 18, 2003; Label: Nippon Columbia; Format: CD; Track listing: 1. Hey Guyz (Korean Ver.) (ヘイガイズ); 2. Vlad (ブラッド); 3. Please Pray For Us (プリーズ・プレイ・フォー・アス); 4. Good Morning (グッド・モーニング); 5. Only One (オンリー・ワン); 6. 마론 인형 (マロン人形); 7. 오렌지 마말레이드 (オレンジ・マーマレード); 8. Hey, Hey, Hey (ヘイ・ヘイ・ヘイ); 9. Waxing Helena (ワキシング・ヘレナ); 10. 부장형사 (部長刑事); 11. 망향 (望郷); 12. 1; 13. Hey Guyz (Japanese Ver.) (ヘイ・ガイズ)	—	—N/a
"—" denotes album did not chart or was not released in that region.

=== Compilation and live albums ===
Title	Album details	Peak chart positions	Sales
Title	Album details	KOR	Sales
True live album	Released: June 1, 2001; Label: Nanjang Music; Format: CD, cassette	—	—N/a
Best A/W Collection	Released: November 17, 2009; Label: Loen Entertainment; Format: CD	No data	No data
Best S/S Collection	Released: April 13, 2010; Label: Barunson; Format: CD, digital download	—	—N/a
"—" denotes album did not chart.

=== Extended plays ===
Title	Album details	Peak chart positions	Sales
Title	Album details	KOR	Sales
Untitled Records (제목 없는 음반)	Released: September 29, 2009; Label: Love Engineering; Format: CD	No data	No data
HOLA!	Released: July 3, 2020; Label: Interpark Entertainment; Format: CD, digital download	No data	No data

=== Singles ===
Title	Year	Peak chart positions	Sales	Album
Title	Year	KOR	Sales	Album
As lead artist
"Loving Memory"	2007	No data	No data	Ashes to Ashes
"EV1"	2011	45		Conspiracy Theory
"Idol"	2011	37		Conspiracy Theory
"Icarus" (이카루스)	2013	47		Goodbye, Grief
"Twenty Five, Twenty One" (스물다섯, 스물하나)	2013	6		Goodbye, Grief
"XOXO"	2017	—	—N/a	Jaurim
Soundtrack appearances
"Phrygia" (프리지아)	2007	No data	No data	The Wonder Years OST
"Carnival Amour"	2008	No data	No data	Antique OST
"Something Good"	2008	No data	No data	Antique OST
"Boating Song" (뱃노래)	2010	—	—N/a	The Great Merchant OST
Other charted songs
"Anna"	2013	90		Goodbye, Grief
"Bye Say Goodbye" (슬픔이여 이제 안녕)	2013	93		Goodbye, Grief
"—" denotes song did not chart.

== Awards and nominations ==
Name of the award ceremony, year presented, category, nominee of the award, and the result of the nomination
Award ceremony	Year	Category	Nominated work	Result	Ref.
Golden Disc Awards	2002	Best Rock Award	"팬이야"	Won	
Golden Disc Awards	2004	Best Rock Award	"Hahaha Song" (하하하쏭)	Won	
Golden Disc Awards	2008	Album Bonsang	Ruby Sapphire Diamond	Nominated	
Golden Disc Awards	2008	Best Rock Award	"Carnival Amour"	Nominated	
Golden Disc Awards	2008	Popularity Award	Jaurim	Nominated	
KMTV Korean Music Awards	2002	Bonsang	Jaurim	Won	
MBC Plus X Genie Music Awards	2018	Song of the Year	"For Ever and Ever"	Nominated	
MBC Plus X Genie Music Awards	2018	Band Music Award	"For Ever and Ever"	Nominated	
MBC Plus X Genie Music Awards	2018	Genie Music Popularity Award	Jaurim	Nominated	
Mnet Asian Music Awards	1999	Best Rock Performance	"Falling Flower" (낙화)	Won	
Mnet Asian Music Awards	2000	Best Rock Performance	"Snake" (뱀)	Nominated	
Mnet Asian Music Awards	2001	Best Rock Performance	"Goodbye, Grief" (파애)	Won	
Mnet Asian Music Awards	2002	Best Rock Performance	"팬이야"	Nominated	
Mnet Asian Music Awards	2004	Best Rock Performance	"Hahaha Song" (하하하쏭)	Nominated	
Mnet Asian Music Awards	2004	Best Group Video	"Hahaha Song" (하하하쏭)	Nominated	
Mnet Asian Music Awards	2005	Best Rock Performance	"Splendor Of Youth" (청춘예찬)	Nominated	
Mnet Asian Music Awards	2008	Best Rock Performance	"Carnival Amour"	Nominated	
Mnet Asian Music Awards	2011	Best Band Performance	"Idol"	Nominated	
Mnet Asian Music Awards	2013	Best Band Performance	"Twenty Five, Twenty One"	Nominated	

=== State honors ===
Name of country, year given, and name of honor
Country	Year	Honor Or Award	Ref.
South Korea (Note: Honors are given at the Korean Popular Culture and Arts Awards, arranged by the Korea Creative Content Agency and hosted by the Ministry of Culture, Sports and Tourism. They are awarded to those who have contributed to the arts and South Korea's pop culture.)	2022	Prime Minister's Commendation	
