= Songs for the Rioters =

Studio album by No Brain
- Released: July 7, 2000
- Studio: MKII Studio
- Genre: Punk rock, garage rock
- Length: 72:16
- Label: Pony Canyon Korea, Moonhwa Sagidan

No Brain chronology
Songs for the Rioters (2000)	Viva No Brain (2001)

Songs for the Rioters (Korean: 청년폭도맹진가; RR: Cheongnyeonpokdomaengjinga) is the debut studio album by South Korean punk rock band No Brain. The album was released on 7 July 2000. The album was considered by many media as the best album in the history of Korean punk rock.

== Background ==
No Brain was formed in 1996 at the live club Drug and they gained their popularity by performing at numerous live clubs in Hongdae in the late 1990s. They created their own label Moonhwa Sagidan, and released an EP Youth 98 (청춘 98) in 1998. They took a short break after the EP's release, as Cha Seung-woo joined the military, and produced their first studio album.

== Critical reception ==
Han Yooseon of IZM reviewed "With music created by fusion of various sounds, No Brain shows the possibility of rock music that can be somewhat flexible while expanding their musical range." Music Y's Jeonjainhyeong said, "The provocation of rhythm guitar, built on the solid foundation of the album's blues, is praised not only for attitude but also for music.," and the album ranked No. 10 on webzine's Best 100 album.

== Track listing ==
CD 1-The Rough Fight (난투편)
No.	Title	Length
1.	"Getting Dark" ("날이 저문다")	4:36
2.	"The National Anthem" ("애국가")	0:59
3.	"Songs for the Rioters" ("청년폭도맹진가")	4:26
4.	"TV Party" ("티브이 파티")	2:42
5.	"Motherfuckers" ("호로자식들")	1:33
6.	"Teenage Politics" ("십대 정치")	6:54
7.	"Viva Korea" ("Viva 대한민국")	4:33
8.	"Scum Gangs" ("잡놈패거리")	3:15
9.	"Seoul, 1998" ("98년 서울")	3:01
10.	"Punk Rider of Passion" ("정열의 펑크라이더")	3:02

CD 2-Adoration of Youth (청춘예찬편)
No.	Title	Length
1.	"Youth with Anger" ("성난 젊음")	3:14
2.	"Please" ("제발 나를")	5:08
3.	"A Lack of Vitality" ("생기 없는 모습")	3:47
4.	"Know Yourself" ("너 자신을 알라")	3:47
5.	"Anywhere in This Land" ("이 땅 어디엔들")	4:16
6.	"The Sea Man" ("바다 사나이")	3:36
7.	"Youth is a Flame" ("청춘은 불꽃이어라")	3:53
8.	"Electronic Punk Remix Medley" ("전자펑크 리믹스메들리")	9:34
