= Wax (singer) =

South Korean singer (born 1972)

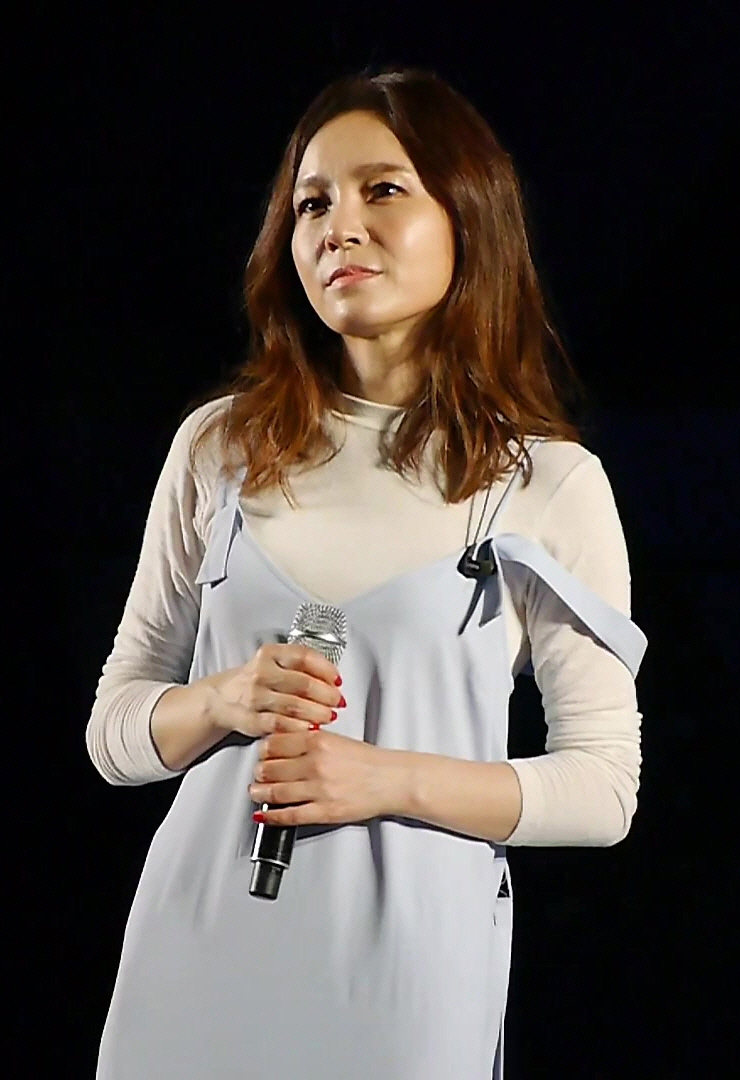
- Wax in January 2020

Background information
- Born: Cho Hye-ri; May 31, 1972 (age 53); Seoul, South Korea
- Genres: K-pop; R&B; Ballad
- Occupation: Singer
- Years active: 1998–present
- Formerly of: DOG

- Wax
- Hangul: 조혜리
- Hanja: 趙慧莉
- RR: Jo Hyeri
- MR: Cho Hyeri

Cho Hye-ri (Korean: 조혜리; born May 31, 1972), better known by her stage name Wax (왁스), is a South Korean pop singer. She debuted in 1998 as the lead vocalist of the rock band DOG. She released her first solo album, The Diary of Mom, in 2000. Wax made her acting debut in 2007 with a main role in the musical Fixing My Makeup, the plot of which is based on her hit song of the same name.

== Biography ==
Wax was born Cho Hye-ri on May 31, 1972. She graduated from the Department of Postmodern Music at Kyung Hee University. Although she has been professionally active since 1998, her personal life has been mostly veiled from the public.

== Career ==
Her debut as a singer was as lead vocalist of the band Dog in 1998. The band only released one album, DOG-1st. The title track of the album was "Kyung Ah's Day", and the album also included nine other songs. After Dog disbanded, she made her solo debut with the stage name Wax in 2000. Her debut album as a soloist was Vol. 1: The Diary of Mom, with a debut song called "Oppa", a cover version (without the suggestive lyrics) of Cyndi Lauper's "She Bop". As of 2012, she has released nine full-length albums and nine other albums. In addition, she has released songs for the original soundtracks of several dramas.

In 2007, Wax made her debut as a musical actress. She was cast as the main actress for the musical Fixing My Makeup, which had a plot based on her song of the same name.

== Discography ==
=== Studio albums ===
Title	Album details	Peak chart positions	Sales
Title	Album details	KOR	Sales
The Diary of Mom (엄마의 일기)	Released: November 13, 2000; Label: J-Entercom; Formats: CD, cassette	7	KOR: 103,225+
Fixing My Makeup (화장을 고치고)	Released: August 9, 2001; Label: Daeyeong A/V; Formats: CD, cassette	3	KOR: 702,443+
Please (부탁해요)	Released: July 5, 2002; Label: Daeyeong A/V; Formats: CD, cassette	2	KOR: 603,173+
Relation (관계)	Released: September 18, 2003; Label: J-Entercom; Formats: CD, cassette	11	KOR:149,530+
Goodbye	Released: November 2, 2005; Label: Yedang Entertainment; Formats: CD, cassette	—	—N/a
Because All Love is Like That (사랑은 다 그런거니까)	Released: December 1, 2006; Label: Yedang Entertainment; Formats: CD, cassette	—	—N/a
Women Live Off Love (여자는 사랑을 먹고)	Released: January 10, 2008; Label: Vitamin Entertainment; Formats: CD, cassette	35	KOR: 1,265+
Always You	Released: July 2, 2009; Label: Vitamin Entertainment; Formats: CD, cassette	No data	No data
Fall In...	Released: December 9, 2010; Label: Warner Music; Formats: CD, digital download	4	No data
Now And Forever	Released: December 4, 2012; Label: Warner Music; Formats: CD, digital download	14	No data
"—" denotes album did not chart.

=== OST and Singles ===
Date	Track	Title(s)
2009.08.26	Can't Cry (울면 안돼)	Non-Album Single
2010.10.29	Two Women (두 여자)	Love, In Between (두 여자) OST
2011.02.25	Heart Is Empty (가슴이 뻥 뚫려)	Digital Single
2011.03.30	Lucky	Single
2012.01.03	I Love You (사랑한다)	Lights and Shadows (빛과 그림자) OST Part 2
2012.03.30	Stay Crying (울고도 남아서)	Dummy Mommy (바보엄마) OST Part 1
2012.10.30	The Teardrops Are Falling (떨어진다 눈물이)	Missing You (보고싶다) OST Part 1
2013.07.18	Dear Love (사랑아)	The Blade and Petal (칼과 꽃) OST Part 1
2013.11.19	Love Wind (사랑 바람)	Empress Ki (기황후) OST Part 2
2014.01.09	Coin Laundry (사랑한 적도 없는)	Non-Album Single
2015.10.08	Not My Mind (내 맘 같지 않아)	Non-Album Single
2015.11.20	Wind Watch (바람시계) (feat. BtoB's Ilhoon)	Digital Single Vol.2
2016.01.24	Tears I Just Cry (그냥 눈물이 나)	My Mom (엄마) OST Part 4
2016.07.13	Just One Shot (딱 한잔만)	Non-Album Single (with SSJ (서사장))
2016.11.01	You Are You Are You Are (너를 너를 너를)	Non-Album Single
2019.06.16	It's Cold Like Winter (겨울인 듯 추워)	Non-Album Single
2021.08.26	I miss you and miss you (그립고 그립다'를 발매한다)	Non-Album Single

=== Compilations ===
Year	Title
2004	Wax Best of Best – Best Day & Night
2004	The Selection Of Wax

=== Remake ===
Year	Title
2010	Unplugged Side A (리메이크 앨범)
2010	Unplugged Side B (리메이크 앨범)

=== Overseas ===
Year	Title
2002	02 (Overseas Version)

== Awards and nominations ==
Award	Year	Category	Nominated work	Result
Golden Disc Awards	2001	Album Bonsang	Fixing My Makeup	Won
Golden Disc Awards	2002	Album Bonsang	Please	Won
Golden Disc Awards	2003	Album Bonsang	Relation	Won
KBS Music Awards	2001	Singer of the Year (Bonsang)	—N/a	Won
KBS Music Awards	2002	Singer of the Year (Bonsang)	—N/a	Won
KBS Music Awards	2003	Singer of the Year (Bonsang)	—N/a	Won
MAMA Awards	2001	Best New Artist	"Oppa"	Won
MAMA Awards	2001	Music Video of the Year (Daesang)	"Fixing My Makeup"	Won
MAMA Awards	2001	Best Ballad Performance	"Fixing My Makeup"	Nominated
MAMA Awards	2002	Best Female Artist	"Please" (부탁해요)	Nominated
MAMA Awards	2003	Best Female Artist	"Relation" (관계)	Nominated
SBS Gayo Daejeon	2001	Bonsang	—N/a	Won
SBS Gayo Daejeon	2002	Bonsang	—N/a	Won
SBS Gayo Daejeon	2003	Ballad Award	—N/a	Won

== See also ==
- K-pop
- Korean rock
