= 2008 Mnet KM Music Festival =

- Date: November 15, 2008
- Location: Seoul Sports Complex, Seoul, South Korea
- Hosted by: Rain
- Most awards: Wonder Girls (3)
- Most nominations: TVXQ, Epik High, Wonder Girls (5)
- Website: Mnet Asian Music Awards

Television/radio coverage
- Network: South Korea: Mnet; Japan: Mnet Japan
- Runtime: around 195 minutes

The 2008 Mnet KM Music Festival (MKMF) was the tenth of the annual music awards in Seoul, South Korea that took place on November 15, 2008, at the Seoul Sports Complex.

Leading the nominees were boy groups TVXQ and Epik High, and girl group Wonder Girls with 5 nominations each. By the end of the ceremony, Wonder Girls won the most wins and became the first artist/performer to receive 3 wins, which included one daesang award. It was followed by Big Bang and Lee Hyori with 2 each.

== Background ==
The award ceremony was held for the tenth consecutive time, which was held at the Seoul Olympic Stadium for the second time. For the first time, however, singer-actor Rain was the only one to host the event. The official slogan used was "My Dream, My Music, My Way, My MKMF".

Before revealing the Best New Male Artist winner, an intermission number from the boy group nominees was performed, resembling the performance by the then new girl group nominees during the ninth ceremony held last year. Together with ex-H.O.T. member Moon Hee-joon, the boy groups performed the debut singles of the past Best New Group winners including Super Junior, SS501, TVXQ, g.o.d, and Shinhwa.

During its 10th anniversary, Clon made an appearance once again to say a little speech during their experiences. Additionally, the first on screen kiss between Lee Hyori and T.O.P happened during their performance that their skit made headlines later on.

== Performers ==
The following individuals and groups, listed in order of appearance, performed musical numbers at the ceremony.

Name(s)	Performed	Notes
Lee Min-ki	"My Way"	My MKMF #1: My Way
2PM, U-Kiss, Shinee, 2AM, Mighty Mouth, Moon Hee-joon	"U", "Warning", "Rising Sun", "Lie", "Brand New", "Warrior's Descendant" Rock ver. and "The Fighting Sprit"	My MKMF #3: Something HOT
Brown Eyed Girls, Jewelry, Jaurim	"How Come", "One More Time", "Magic Carpet Ride"	My MKMF #3: Girl's Got Reloaded
SG Wannabe, Shin Seung-hun	"La La La", "Even After A Long While"	Intermission number after the former received the 'Hallyu Singers by the Japanese Press' recognition and before the latter received the 'Mnet PD's Choice Award'
Wonder Girls ft. 2PM	"Nobody" Tango ver. and disco ver.	My MKMF #4: Secret Party
Big Bang ft. Lee Hyori	"Look At Me Only", "Lie", "Haru Haru", "U Go-Girl" remix, "Look At Me Hyori", "10 Minutes"	My MKMF #5: Scandalous
Hong Hyun (홍현아), Epik High, Kim Chang-wan band	"Redemption", "One", "Right Dudu Dada", "Naughty Boy"	My MKMF #6: Rescue
Khalil Fong and Chae Yeon	"Ai Ai Ai"《愛愛愛》 Chinese ver.	
TVXQ	"The Way U Are", "Rising Sun", "'O'-Jung.Ban.Hap.", "Purple Line", "Hug", "Wrong Number", "Mirotic"	My MKMF #7: My Addiction
Rain	"My Way", "It's Raining", "Only You", "Don't Stop", "Rainism"	My MKMF #8: 2098 Still Raining

== Winners and nominees ==
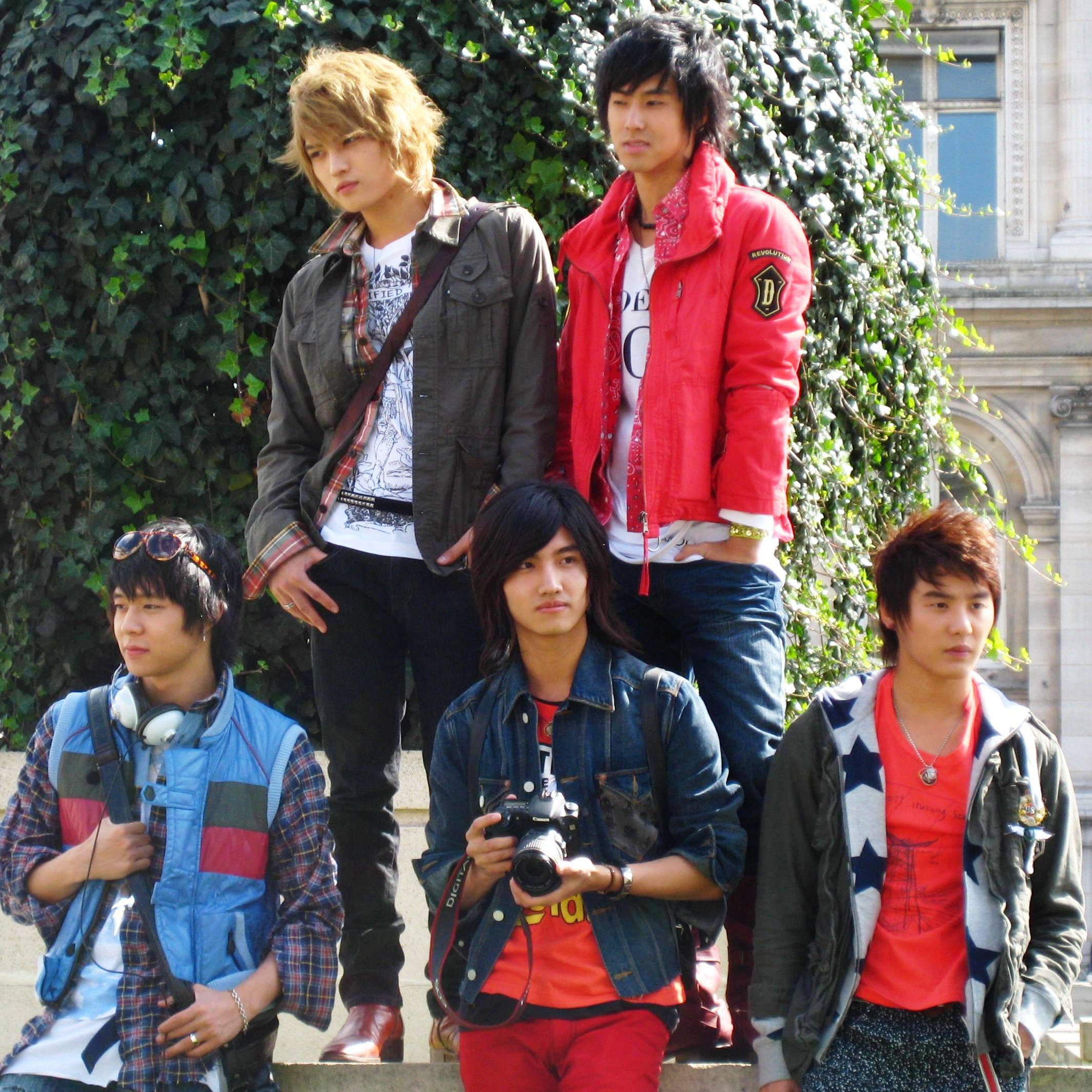
TVXQ, Album of the Year

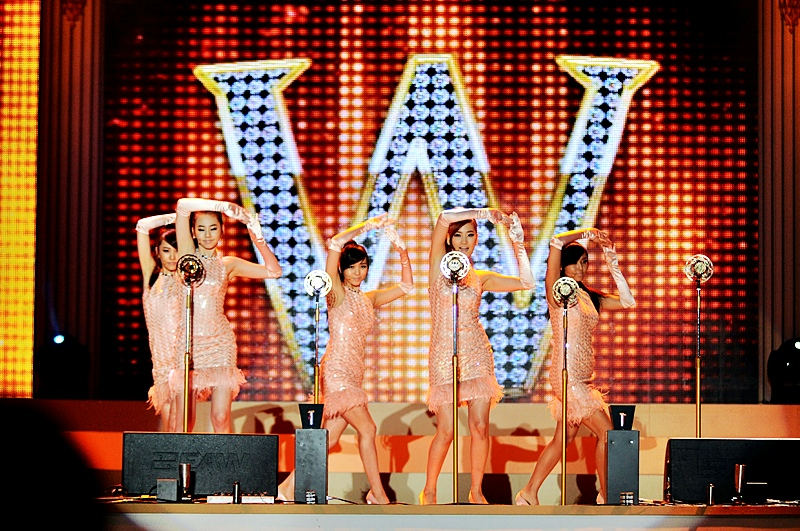
Wonder Girls, Song of the Year, Best Music Video, and Best Female Group

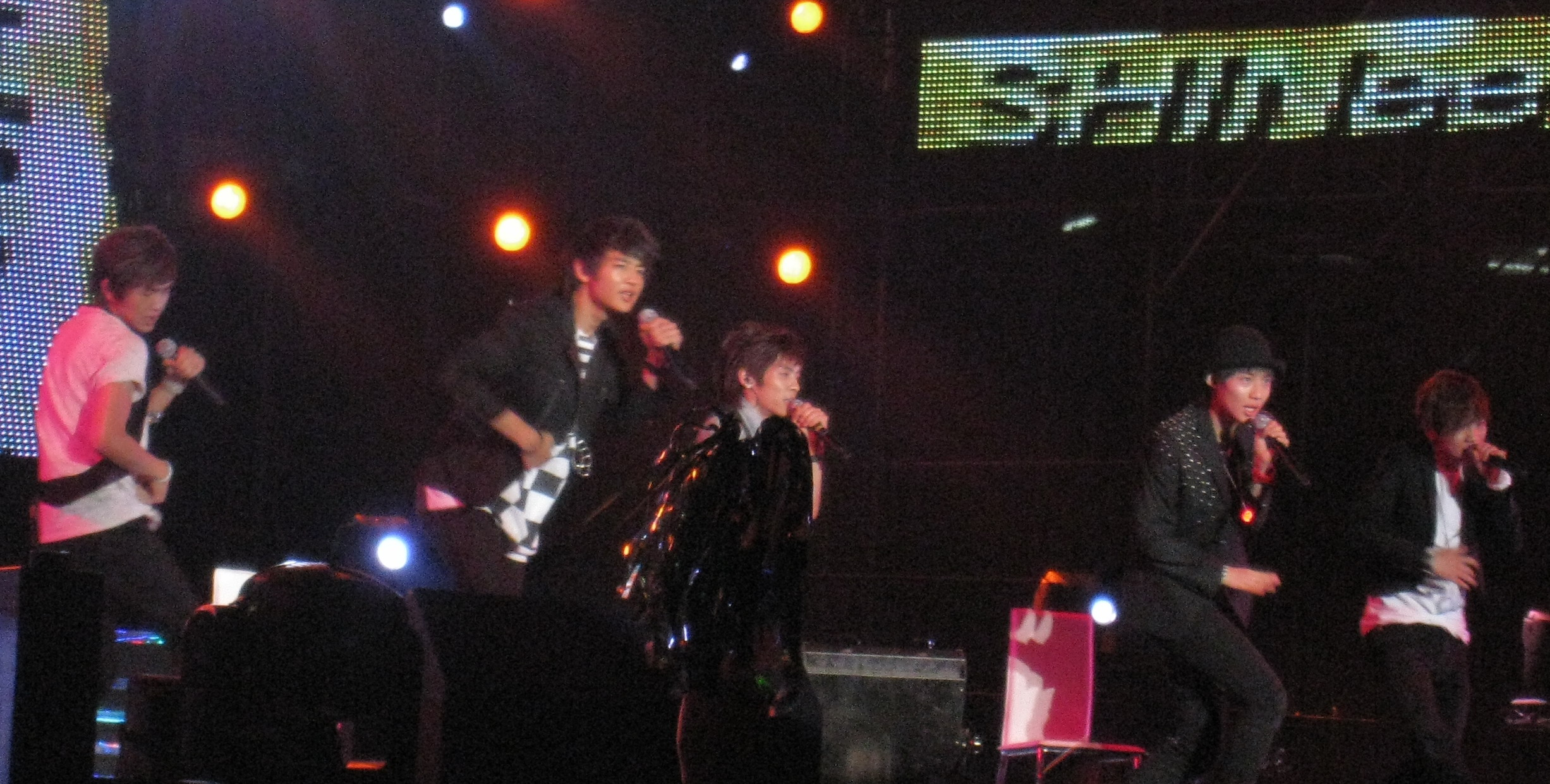
Shinee, Best New Male Artist

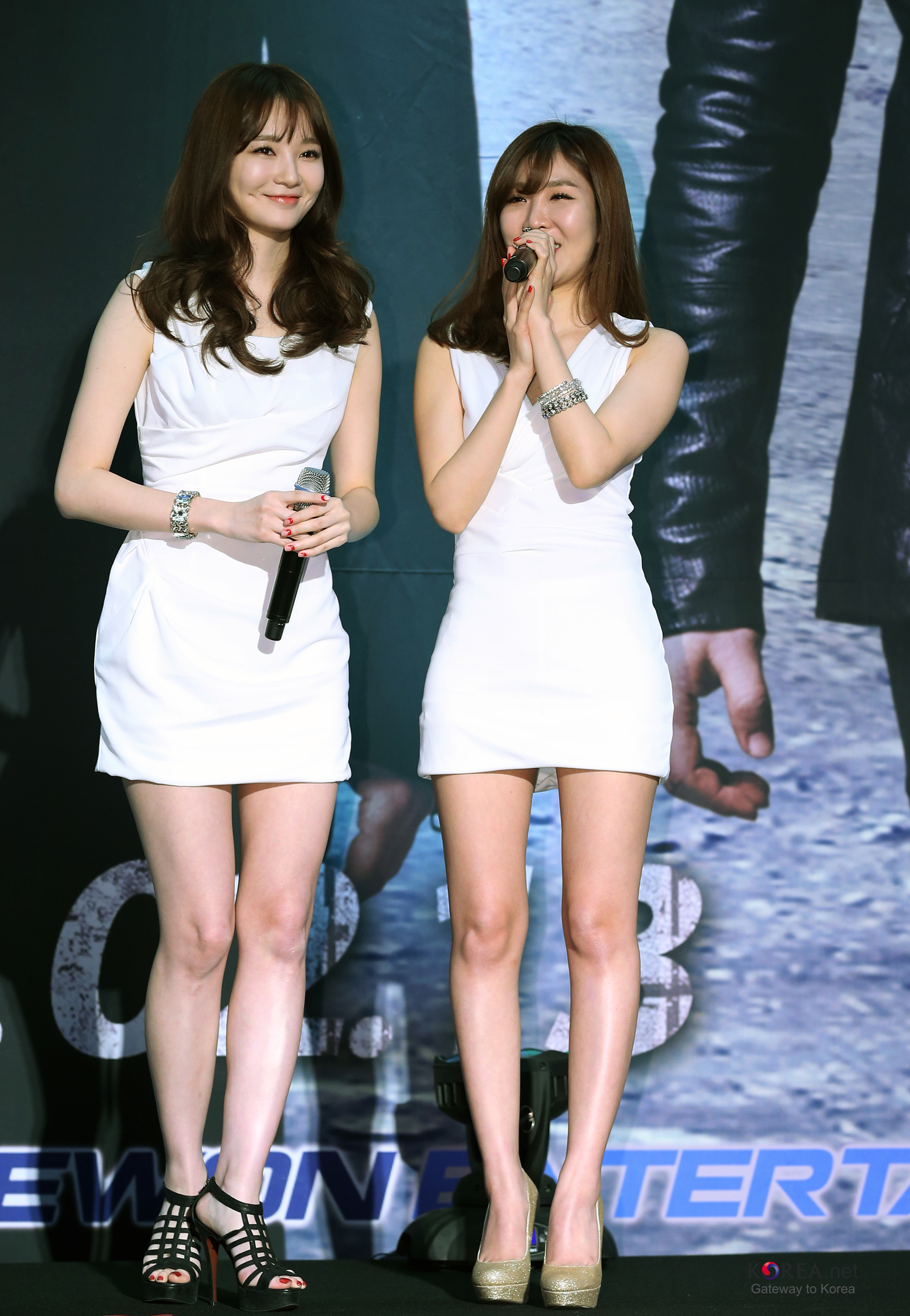
Davichi, Best New Female Artist

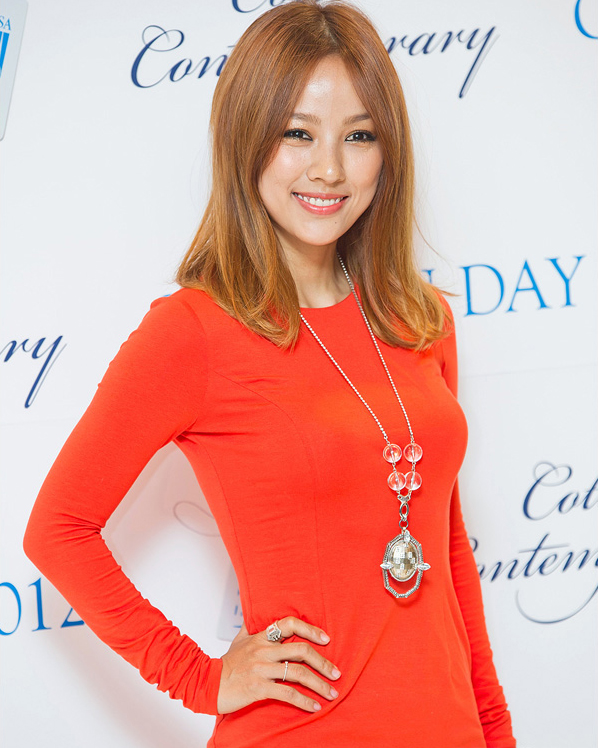
Lee Hyori, Best Dance Performance

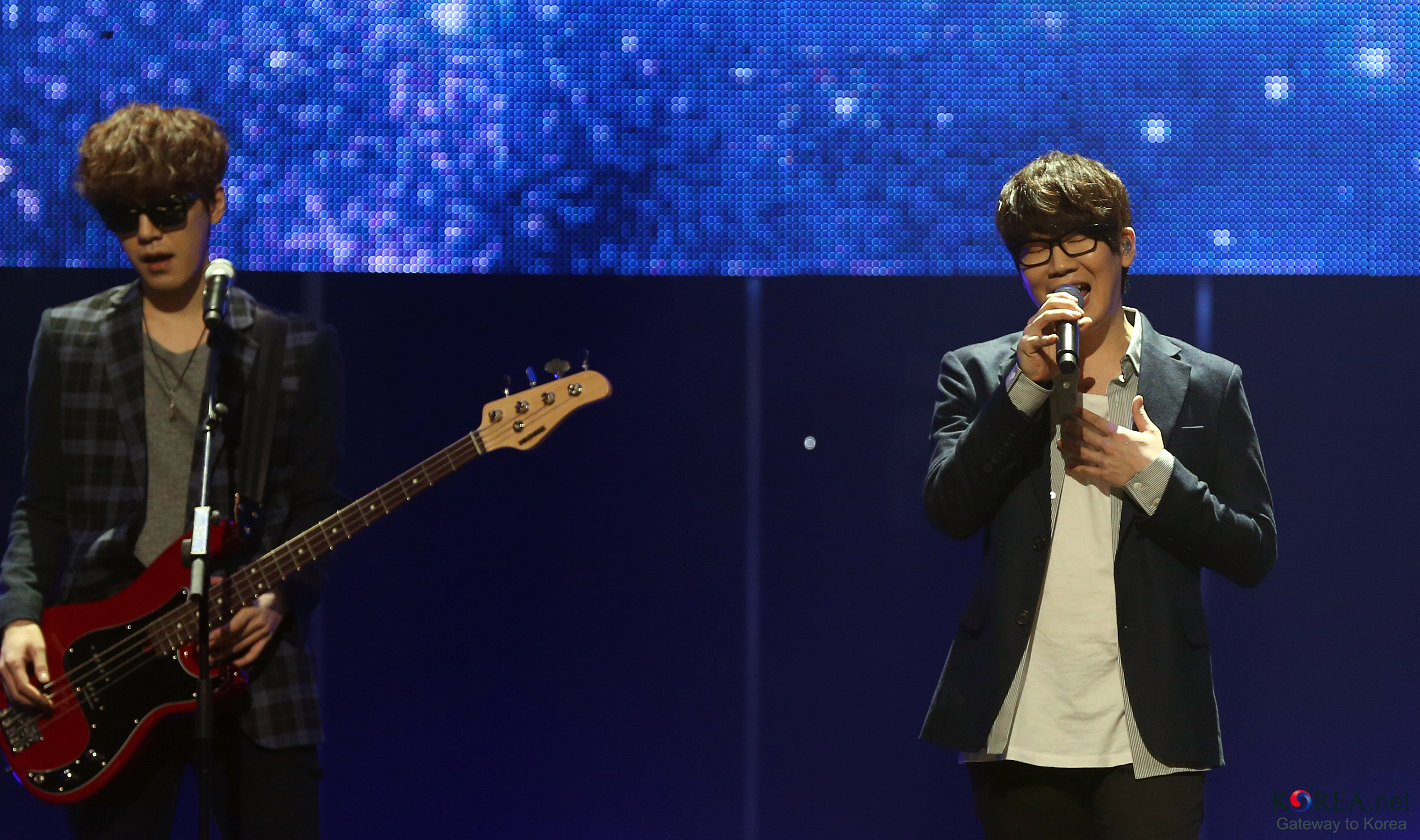
Nell, Best Rock Performance

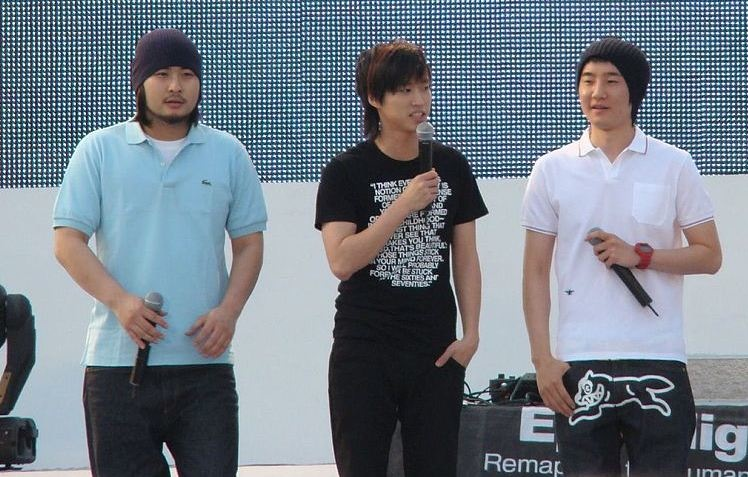
Epik High, Best Hip Hop Performance

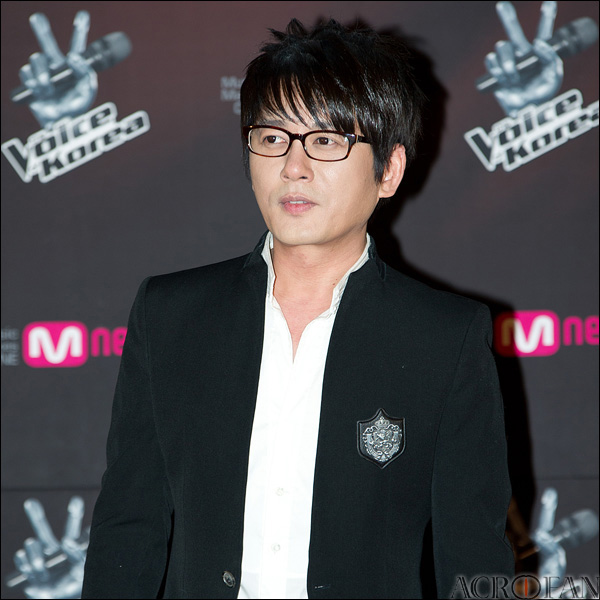
Shin Seung-hun, Mnet PD's Choice Awardee

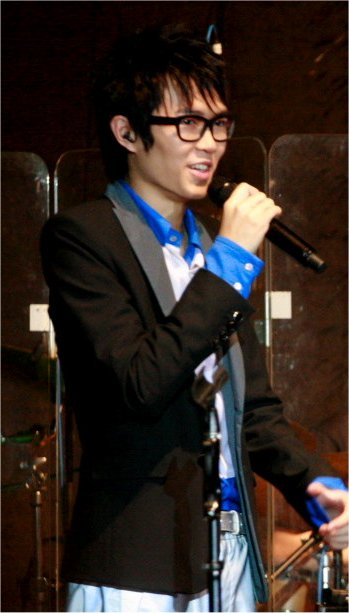
Khalil Fong, Best New Asian Artist

Winners are listed first and highlighted in boldface.

Album of the Year (daesang)	Artist of the Year (daesang)
**TVXQ – Mirotic**; Kim Dong-ryool – Monologue; Brown Eyes – Two Things Needed For The Same Purpose And 5 Objects; Epik High – Pieces, Part One; Toy – Thank You	**Big Bang**; TVXQ; Seo Taiji; Wonder Girls; Lee Hyori
Song of the Year (daesang)	Best Music Video
**Wonder Girls – "Nobody"**; TVXQ – "Mirotic"; Big Bang – "Haru Haru"; Epik High – "One"; Lee Hyori – "U-Go-Girl"	**Wonder Girls – "Nobody"**; Dynamic Duo – "Solo"; Uhm Jung-hwa – "Disco" ft. T.O.P; Epik High – "One" (ft. Ji Sun); Taeyang – "Prayer"
Best New Male Artist	Best New Female Artist
**Shinee – "Replay"**; 2PM – "10 Out of 10"; 2AM – "This Song"; Mighty Mouth – "I Love You" ft. JJ; U-Kiss – "I'm Not A Kid"	**Davichi – "I Love You Even Though I Hate You"**; Moon Ji-eun – "The Fox Song"; Sunha – "Chantey Chantey"; Lee Hyun-ji – "Kiss Me Kiss Me"; Joo – "Because Of A Man"
Best Male Group	Best Female Group
**Big Bang – "Haru Haru"**; TVXQ – "Mirotic"; Epik High – "One" (ft. Ji Sun); F.T. Island – "After Love"; SG Wannabe – "La La La"	**Wonder Girls – "Nobody"**; Brown Eyed Girls – "Love"; Girls' Generation – "Kissing You"; SeeYa – "Hot Girl"; Jewelry – "One More Time"
Best House & Electronic	Best Dance Performance
**Jewelry – "One More Time"**; Gummy – "I'm Sorry" ft. T.O.P; Brown Eyed Girls – "Love"; Big Bang – "Haru Haru"; Uhm Jung-hwa – "Disco" ft. T.O.P	**Lee Hyori – "U-Go-Girl"**; TVXQ – "Mirotic"; Girls' Generation – "Kissing You"; Super Junior-H – "Cooking Cooking"; Wonder Girls – "Nobody"
Best Male Artist	Best Female Artist
**Seo Taiji – "Moai"**; Kim Dong-ryool – "Let's Start Again"; Taeyang – "Only Look at Me"; Toy – "Hot Goodbye"; MC Mong – "Circus"	**Lee Hyori – "U-Go-Girl"**; Gummy – "I'm Sorry" ft. T.O.P; Seo In-young – "Cinderella"; Uhm Jung-hwa – "Disco" ft. T.O.P; Younha – "Telepathy"
Best Ballad/R&B Performance	Best Rock Performance
**Brown Eyes – "Don't Go Don't Go"**; Kim Dong-ryool – "Let's Start Again"; Park Ji-Hyun – During The Days I Want To See You"; Taeyang – "Only Look at Me"; V.O.S – "Beautiful Life"	**Nell – "Time To Walk Memories"**; Moon Hee-joon – "Obsession"; Seo Taiji – "Moai"; Jaurim – "Carnival Amour"; TransFixion – "Radio"
Best Hip Hop Performance	Best OST
**Epik High – "One" (ft. Ji Sun)**; Dynamic Duo – "Solo" ft. Alex; Mighty Mouth – "Energy"; Eun Ji-won – "Adios"; MC Mong – "Circus"	**Kim Jong-wook and SG Wannabe – "Fate Reverse" (East of Eden)**; Kim Taeyeon – "If" (Hong Gil-dong); Yoo Seung-chan – "I Love You" (Mom's Dead Upset); Tei – "Time Of Dreams" (Gourmet); F.T. Island – "One Word" (On Air)

Special awards

- Auction Netizen Popularity Award – **TVXQ – "Mirotic"**
- Hallyu Singers by the Japanese Press – **SG Wannabe**
- Mnet PD's Choice Award – **Shin Seung-hun**
- Discovery of the Year Award - **Galaxy Express**
- MKMF 10th Anniversary Commemorative – **H.O.T.** (received by Moon Hee-joon)
- Overseas Viewers' Award – **TVXQ – "Mirotic"**
- Best New Asian Artist – **Khalil Fong**
- Composer Award: **Kim Jong-wan** – "Time to walk memories" (기억을 걷는 시간) (Nell)
- Lyricist Award: **Kim Dong-ryul** – "Let's Start Again"
- Arrangement Award: **Tablo** – "One"
- Music Portal Mnet Award: **Big Bang**

== Multiple awards ==
=== Artist(s) with multiple wins ===
The following artist(s) received two or more wins (excluding the special awards):

Awards	Artist(s)
3	Wonder Girls
2	Big Bang
2	Lee Hyori

=== Artist(s) with multiple nominations ===
The following artist(s) received more than two nominations:

Nominations	Artist(s)
5	TVXQ
5	Epik High
5	Wonder Girls
4	Big Bang
4	Lee Hyori
3	Kim Dong-ryool
3	Seo Taiji
3	Uhm Jung-hwa
3	Taeyang

== Presenters ==
- Rain – Main host of the show
- Shin Dong-wook and Yoon Ji-min – Presenters of the award for Best New Female Artist
- Ryu Deok-hwan and Wonder Girls – Presenters of the award for Best New Male Artist
- Baek Ji-young and Byeon Jin-seob (변진섭) – Presenters of the award for Best Ballad/R&B Award
- 박주만 and Jae Young-jeon (전재영) – Presenters of the award for Auction Netizen Popularity Award
- Kim Hyun-soo (김현수) and Hong Soo-ah (홍수아) – Presenters of the award for Best Dance Performance
- Ahn Hye-Kyung and Sung Chun Hwang (황성철) – Presenters of the award for Best OST
- 정민실 (Japan Radio DJ) – Presenter of the special award for Hallyu Singers by the Japanese Press
- Kim Shin-young – Presenter of the award for Best House & Electronic
- Leessang and Hong Seo-beom (홍서범) – Presenters of the award for Best Hip Hop Performance
- Heocham (허참) and Joo – Presenters of the award for Best Rock Performance
- Lee Jin-wook and Yoon So-yi – Presenters of the award for Best Male Artist
- Jeon Hye-bin and Tae Jin-ah – Presenters of the award for Best Female Artist
- Shinee – Handed in the award for 10th Year Anniversary Remember Award
- Sean (션) and his son No Harang (노하랑) – Introduced the next performers (My MKMF #5)
- Go Eun-ah and Lee Wan – Go Eun-ah and Lee Wan
- Yoon So-yi, Chae Yeon, and 주이 – Presenters of the award for Best New Asian Artist
- Park Tae-hwan – Presenter of the award for Best Female Group
- Yoon Jin-seo and Lee Chun-hee – Presenters of the award for Best Male Group
- (Lee Gisang (이기상) and Choe Halli (최할리)) Jin-hie Park and Lee Ki-woo – Presenters of the award for Best Music Video
- Bom Yeoreum Gaeul Kyeoul – Presenters of the award for Song of the Year
- Shin Seung-hun – Presenter of the award for Artist of the Year
- Kim Chang-wan – Presenter of the award for Album of the Year
