= 2001 Mnet Music Video Festival =

3rd edition of the MAMA Awards held in 2001

- Date: November 23, 2001
- Location: Little Angels Arts Center, Seoul, South Korea
- Hosted by: Cha Tae-hyun and Song Hye-kyo
- Most awards: Wax (2)
- Most nominations: Wax (3)
- Website: Mnet Music Video Festival

Television/radio coverage
- Network: Mnet (South Korea); Mnet Japan (Japan)
- Runtime: Approximately 196 minutes

The 2001 Mnet Music Video Festival (MMF) took place on November 23, 2001 at the Little Angels Arts Center in Seoul, South Korea. The ceremony was hosted by actor-singer Cha Tae-hyun and actress Song Hye-kyo. The show's most-awarded artist was Wax who won two awards out of her three nominations.

== Background ==
The award-giving body continued to use the name M.net Korean Music Festival (MKMF) for the third time. It was also the third time for the event to take place at the Little Angels Arts Center, Seoul, South Korea. Actor and singer Cha Tae-hyun hosted the event for the second consecutive year. The Grand Prize (Daesang) were the Best Popular Music Video Award and Music Video of the Year.

== Performers ==
Artist(s)	Song(s)	Notes
The Rocky Horror Show, Hong Rok-gi (홍록기), Kim Rae-yeon (김래연), Kim Rae-hui (김래희), Yoon Hee-seok, Moon Jeong-hee	Time Warp Korean ver. and Sweet Transvestite Korean ver. medley	Special Performance 1 – Opening of the show
Wax	"Wanna Fall In Love" and "Fix My Make-up"	Best New Female Artist winner
Kim Hyun-jung	"You Who Left" (떠난 너)	
g.o.d (with Park Jin-young)	"Lies" (거짓말)	Produced by Park Jin-young; Special Performance 2 – Middle of the show
Lee Ki-chan (with Park Jin-young)	"Love Has Left Me Again" (또 한번 사랑은 가고)	Produced by Park Jin-young; Special Performance 2 – Middle of the show
Park Jin-young	"I Have A Girlfriend" (난 여자가 있는데)	Produced by Park Jin-young; Special Performance 2 – Middle of the show
Angel's Chorus (Dana, Yuri, Joanne & Rottyful Sky)	"Lullaby" and "Baby One More Time"	
Click-B	"For You (A Letter)", "Break It", "Undefeatable"	
Shinhwa	"Wild Eyes", "Hey Come On"	
Kim Gun-mo	"Sleepless Rainy Night", "First Impression", "When White Snow Falls", "Speed", "Love Is Gone", "Nightmare", "Boomerang", "One Flew Over The Cuckoo's Nest"	Special Performance 3
Kangta	"Polaris", "I Like Rainy Days Like Today", "My Life"	Best Male Artist winner
M2M	"Everything"	
g.o.d	"Lie"	Most Popular Music Video

== Presenters ==
2001 Mnet Music Video Festival hosts

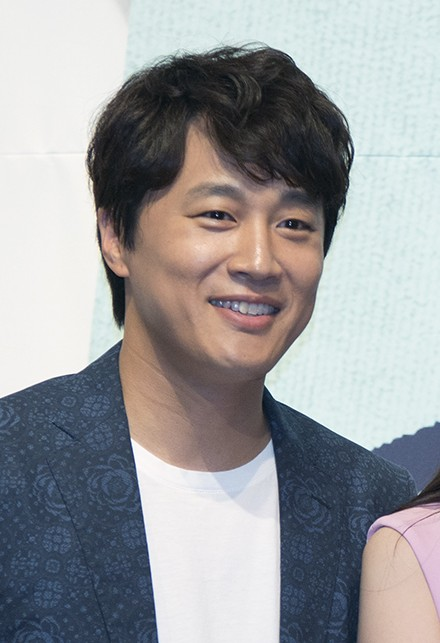
Cha Tae-hyun

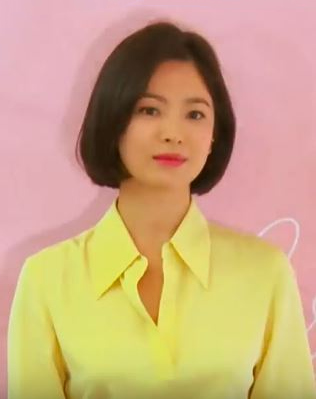
Song Hye-kyo

Name(s)	Role
Cha Tae-hyun and Song Hye-kyo	Main hosts of the show
Yoon Chan (윤찬) and Shin Min-a	Presenters for the award for Best New Male Artist
Kim Gyu-ri and Yoon Tae-young	Presenters for the award for Best New Female Artist
Kang Byeong-gyu (강병규) and S.E.S.	Presenters for the award for Best New Group
Uhm Jung-hwa and Lee Hyun-do (이현도) (with his dog – "Hammer")	Presenters for the award for Best Hip-hop Performance
Moon Cheon-sik (문천식) and Go Yeong-hwan (고영환)	Presenters for the award for Best Indie Performance
Kang Seong-beom (강성범) – 연변총각	Korean Hallyu Wave Report (VTR)
Kang Seong-beom (강성범), Kim Ga-yeon, and Sim Hyeon-seop (심현섭)	Presenters for the award for Asian Viewer's Request Award
Kim Jung-hwa and Hong Rok-gi (홍록기)	Presenters for the award for Best Dance Performance
Joong Su-geun (정수근) and Byun Jung-soo	Presenters for the award for Best R&B Performance
Son Jeong-min (손정민) and g.o.d	Presenters for the award for Best International Artist
Kim Hye-soo	Presenter for the Achievement Award
Gang Heon (강헌) and 김규흰	Presenters for the award for Professional Judges Special
Lee Sung-jin, Kim Yeong-cheol, Lee Jae-soo, Kim Jong-min, Sung Si-kyung, Kim Bo-kyung, Lee Na-young, Kim Hyun-chul, and more	Actors of Music Videos X-Files (VTR)
Yoo Seung-jun and Park Ye-jin	Presenters for the award for Best Female Artist
Go Soo and Kim Hyo-jin	Presenters for the award for Best Male Artist
Yu Oh-seong and 괵경택	Presenters for the award for Best Rock Performance
Lee Chun-soo and Kim Chae-yeon (김채연)	Presenters for the award for Best Ballad Performance
Kim Gook-jin and Lee Seung-yeon	Presenters for the award for Best Music Video Director
Joo Young-hoon and Han Go-eun	Presenters for the award for Best Mixed Group
Kim Gun-mo and Kim Min (김민)	Presenters for the award for Best Female Group
Nam Hin-seok (남힌석) and Lee Hyeon-kyung (이현경)	Presenters for the award for Best Male Group
Cha Tae-hyun and Song Hye-kyo (hosts)	Announced Best Music Video daesang award
Cha Tae-hyun and Song Hye-kyo (hosts)	Announced Most Popular Music Video daesang award

== Winners and nominees ==
=== Selection process ===
During the initial screening, fans added their candidates through the award's official website. The Mnet producers and the Nominee Selection Committee then choose the nominees. The official website was opened to the voters from Korea and Japan afterwards. In addition, professional judges have also chosen from the nominees. The votes from the fans and the judges were combined for the winners of each category.

Winners are listed first and highlighted in boldface.

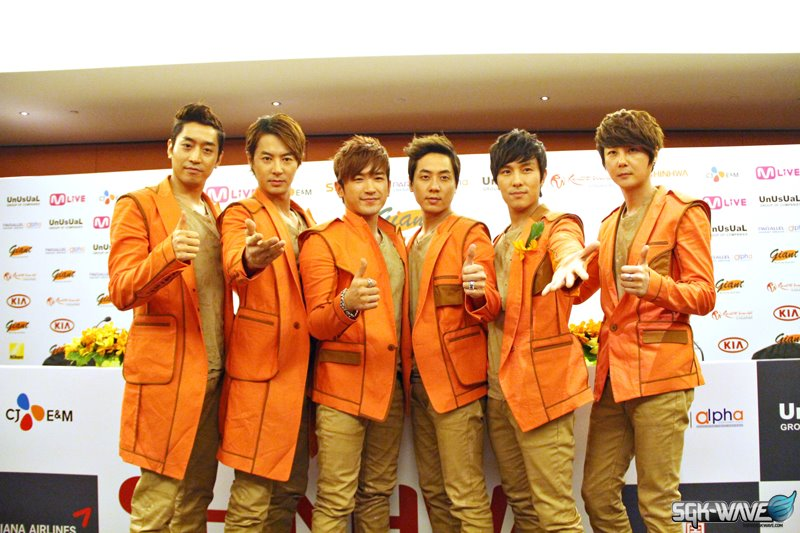
Shinhwa won Best Male Group

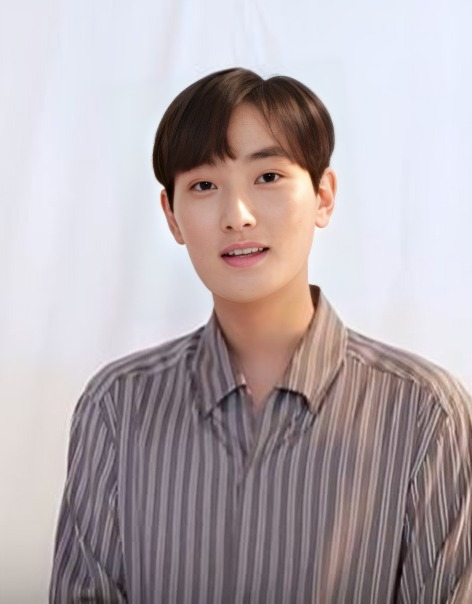
Kangta won Best Male Artist

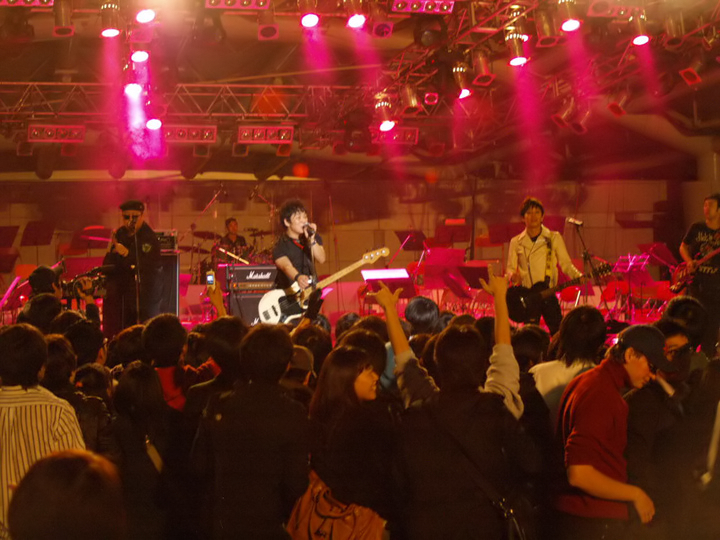
Crying Nut won Best Indie Performer

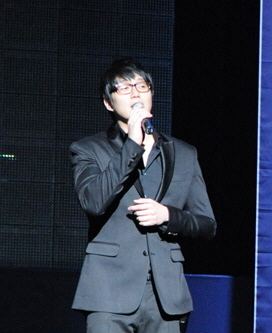
Sung Si-kyung won Best New Male Artist

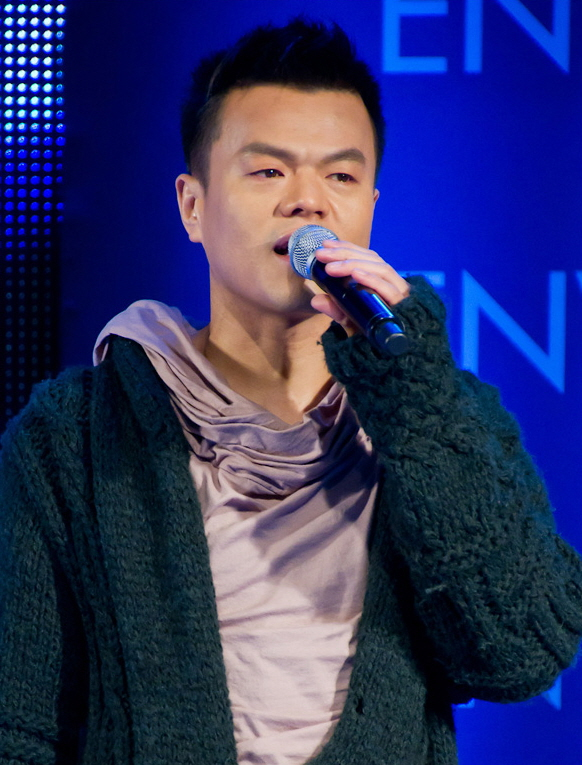
Park Jin-young won Best R&B Performer

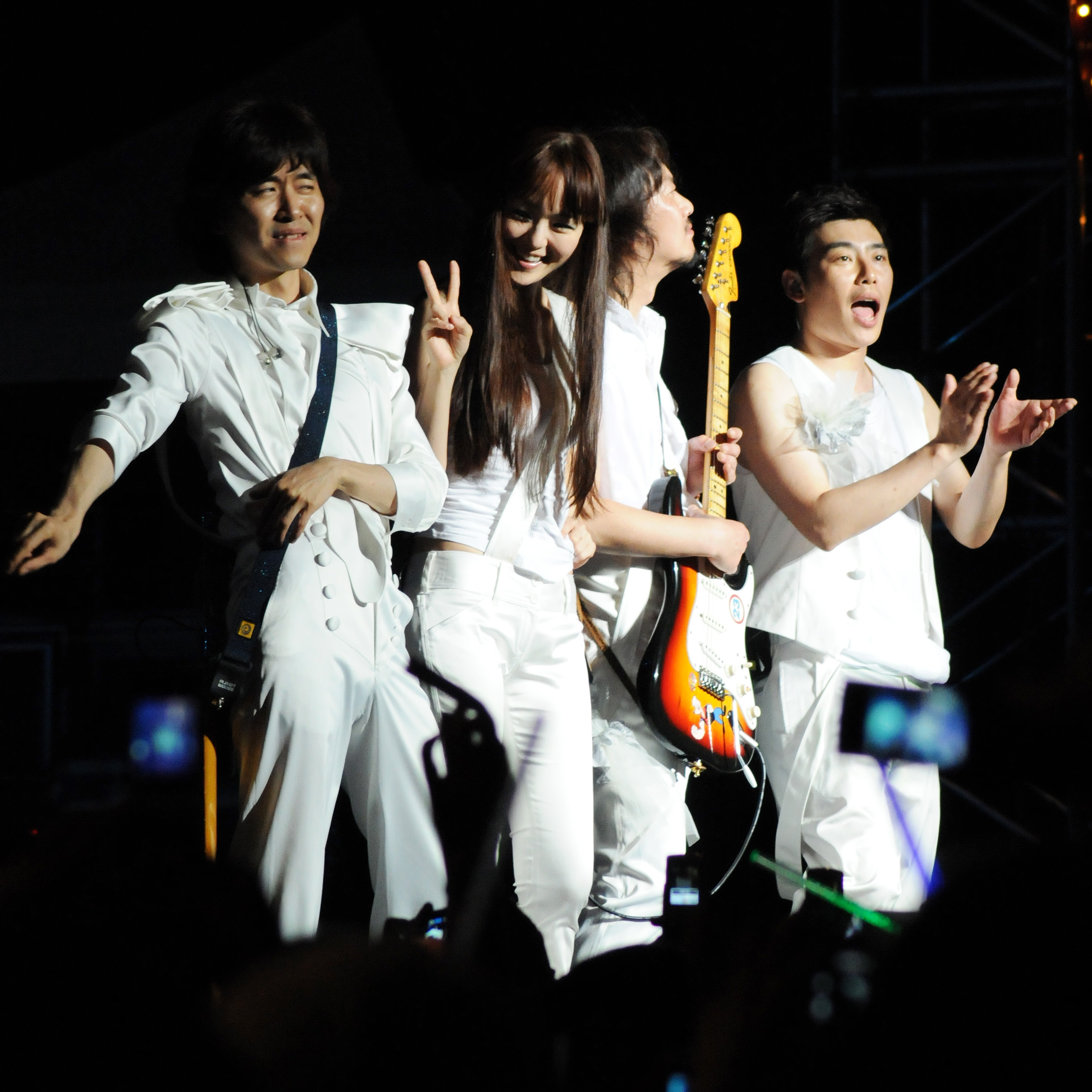
Jaurim won Best Rock Performer

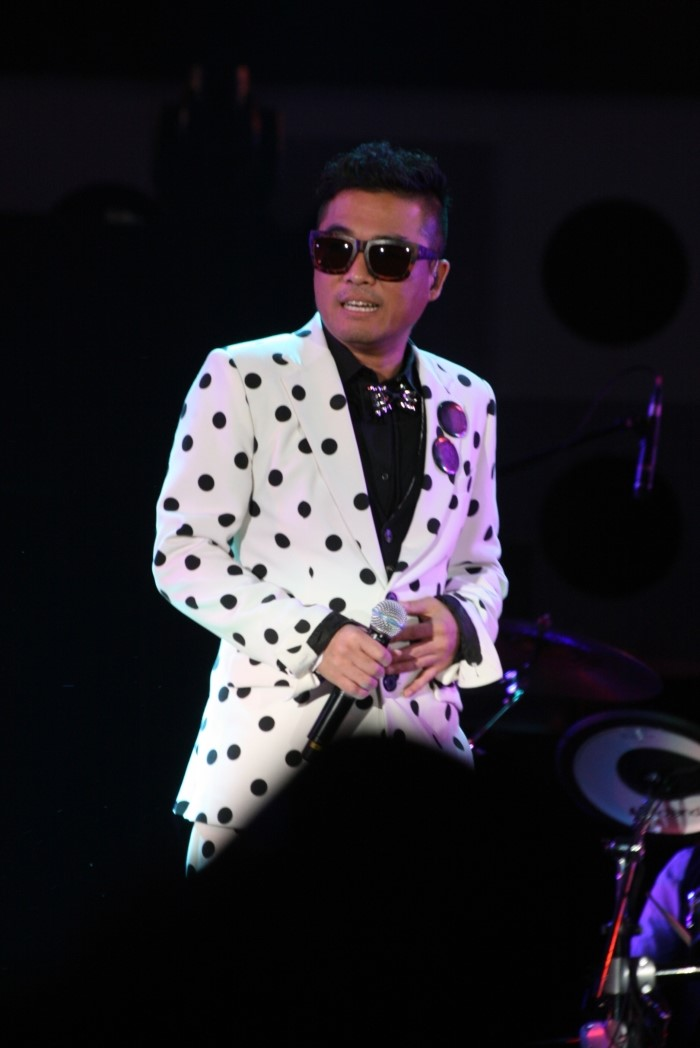
Kim Gun-mo won Best Ballad Performer

Most Popular Music Video (Daesang)	Music Video of the Year (Daesang)
**g.o.d – "Lies"**	**Wax – "Fix My Makeup"**
Best New Male Artist	Best New Female Artist
**Sung Si-kyung – "Like The First Time"**; Psy – "Bird"; Yang Dong-geun – "Guri Bang Bang"; Cha Tae-hyun – "I Love You"; Perry – "Storm"	**Wax – "Oppa"**; Dana – "Until The End of the World"; Yuri – "Sad Soul"; Joanne – "First Love"; Rottyful Sky – "Gotta Be Kidding"; Harisu – "Temptation"
Best New Group	Best Mixed Group
**Brown Eyes – "Already One Year" (벌써 1년)"**; D.BACE – "Everything To You" (모든것을 너에게); X-Large – "You"; The Jadu – "Goodbye"; To-Ya – "Look"	**Koyote – "Paran"**; Roo'ra – "Clear Away" (정리); S#arp – "100 Days Prayer" (백일기도); Space A – "Sexy Man" (바람난 남자); Cool – "Jumpo Mambo" (점포맘보)
Best Male Group	Best Female Group
**Shinhwa – "Wild Eyes"**; UN – "Pado" (파도); Jinusean- "A-Yo"; g.o.d – "Lie" (거짓말); Click-B – "Undefeatable" (백전무패)	**S.E.S. – "Just In Love" (꿈을 모아서)**; Diva – "Perfect!"; Baby Vox – "Game Over"; As One – "I'm Fine" (천만에요); Fin.K.L – "You Will Never Know" (당신은 모르실거야)
Best Male Artist	Best Female Artist
**Kangta – "Polaris"**; Moon Hee-joon – "Alone"; Yoo Seung-jun – "Wow"; Im Chang-jung – "Why wait" (기다리는 이유); Jo Sung-mo – "Goodbye My Love"	**Kim Hyun-jung – "You Who Left" (떠난 너)**; Yangpa – "Special Night"; Uhm Jung-hwa – "Crack" (틈); J – "The Saddest Words" (가장 슬픈 말); T – "As Time Goes By" (시간이 흐른 뒤)
Best R&B Performance	Best Rock Performance
**Park Jin-young – "I Have a Girlfriend"**; Johan Kim – "Just Until Today" (오늘까지만); Park Hwayobi (박화요비) – "Teardrop" (눈물); Brown Eyes – "Already One Year" (벌써 1년); Fly to the Sky – "The Promise" (약속)	**Jaurim – "Goodbye Grief" (파애)**; Kim Kyung-ho – "Sacrifice" (희생); Roller Coaster – "Love Virus" (러브 바이러스); Seomoon Tak – "All You Need Is Love" (사미인곡); Eve – "I'll Be There"
Best Hip Hop Performance	Best Indie Performance
**Drunken Tiger – "Good Life"**; CB Mass – "Real"; Yoon Hui-jung (윤희중) – "My Life"; Joosuc – "Last Man Standing"; Jinusean – "A-yo"	**Crying Nut – "Deep in the Night"**; Line 3 Butterfly (3호선 버터 플라이) – "The Only Thing To Walk" (걷기만 해); No Brain – "Go To The Beach" (해변으로 가요); Rotten Apple – "Someone"; All Lies Band – "Superman" (초인술퍼맨)
Best Dance Performance	Best Ballad Performance
**Yoo Seung-jun – "Wow"**; Kim Hyun-jung – "You Who Left" (떠난 너); Shinhwa – "Wild Eyes"; S.E.S. – "Just In Love" (꿈을 모아서); Hong Kyung-min – "Take It" (가져가)	**Kim Gun-mo – "Sorry" (미안해요)**; Kangta – "Polaris"; Lee Ki-chan – "Love Has Left Again" (또 한번 사랑은 가고); Wax – "Fix My Make-up" (화장을 고치고); Position – "I Love You"
Special Jury Prize	Best International Artist
**No Brain – "Go To The Beach" (해변으로 가요)**; As One – "You're Welcome" (천만에요); Rotten Apple – "Someone"; Lee Ki-chan – "Love Has Left Again" (또 한번 사랑은 가고)	**N'Sync – "Pop"**; Bosson – "One in a Million"; Brian McKnight – "Love of My Life"; M2M – "Everything"; Mariah Carey – "Loverboy"; Michael Jackson – "You Rock My World"; Westlife – "Uptown Girl"
Best Music Video Director
**Cha Eun-taek**; Go Young-jun; Kim Se-hun; Seo Hyeon-seung; Hong Jong-ho

=== Special awards ===
- Asian Viewer's Request Award: **NRG – "Sorrow" (비)**
- Achievement Award: **Clon**

== Multiple nominations and awards ==
=== Artist(s) with multiple wins ===
The following artist(s) received two or more wins (excluding the special awards):

Awards	Artist(s)
2	Wax

=== Artist(s) with multiple nominations ===
The following artist(s) received two or more nominations:

Nominations	Artist(s)
3	Wax
2	g.o.d
2	Brown Eyes
2	Shinhwa
2	S.E.S.
2	Yoo Seung-jun
2	Kim Hyun-jung
2	Jinusean
2	Kangta
