= Seo Tai Ji (album) =

Studio album by Seo Taiji
- Released: July 7, 1998
- Studio: Techno T Studio
- Genre: Alternative rock, nu metal
- Length: 28:06
- Label: Samsung Music
- Producer: Seo Taiji

Seo Taiji chronology
Seo Tai Ji (1998)	Ultramania (2000)

Seo Tai Ji is the debut studio album by Korean musician Seo Taiji, released in 1998. Although it is the first solo album by Seo, some refer to it as his fifth following the four albums released by Seo Taiji and Boys. The musician created the album entirely by himself, including playing every instrument and producing it. The album was released in 1998 while Seo lived in the United States and, with no promotion, it sold over 1.3 million units, making it one of the best-selling albums in South Korea.

== Background ==
After having made the decision to disband Seo Taiji and Boys himself while recording their fourth album, Seo also announced he was retiring in January 1996. He moved to the United States and lived in obscurity. With no promotion, he released his first solo album in Korea on July 7, 1998. He would remain in the United States until August 2000, corresponding with the release of his next album Ultramania.

For Seo Tai Ji, Bando Eumban signed Seo to a one-year, $1.43 million contract, with record distribution by Samsung Music. Unusually, Seo did not appear in any promotional content for the album, such as TV or music videos. He created the album entirely by himself, including producing, executive producing, and recording it. He did not design the packaging though.

Music videos without the musician were made for "Take One," "Take Two," and "Take Five."

== Track listing ==
All tracks are written by Seo Taiji

No.	Title	Length
1.	"Maya"	0:25
2.	"Take One"	4:17
3.	"Take Two"	3:59
4.	"Radio"	0:23
5.	"Take Three"	4:32
6.	"Take Four"	3:28
7.	"Lord"	0:24
8.	"Take Five"	4:17
9.	"Take Six"	2:58
Total length:		28:06

15th Anniversary Edition (2007)
No.	Title	Length
10.	"Take Two ('04 Zero Live)"	4:21
11.	"Take Four ('04 Zero Live)"	3:49
12.	"Take Six ('04 Zero Live)"	3:04
13.	"Take Five ('04 Zero Live)"	4:23

== Personnel ==
- Seo Taiji − vocals, guitar, bass, keyboard, samples, scratch, arrangement
- Design − Lee Dong Il, Park Sung Kyu, Park Jong Bum, Song Sang Keun, and Jung Joo Seok
