= Seo Taiji =

South Korean singer and musician (born 1972)

- 서태지
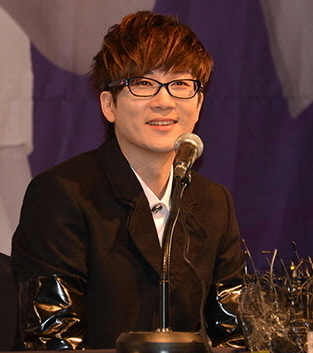
- Seo Taiji on October 20, 2014
- Born: Jeong Hyeon-cheol; February 21, 1972 (age 54); Seoul, South Korea
- Occupations: Singer-songwriter; musician; record producer
- Years active: 1989–1996; 1998–present
- Spouses: Lee Ji-ah (m. 1997; div. 2006); Lee Eun-sung (m. 2013)
- Children: 1
- Musical career
- Genres: K-pop; nu metal; alternative rock; rap rock; hip hop; new jack swing
- Instruments: Vocals; guitar; bass guitar
- Label: Seo Taiji Company; Bando Eumban
- Formerly of: Sinawe; Seo Taiji and Boys

Korean name
- Hangul: 정현철
- Hanja: 鄭鉉哲
- RR: Jeong Hyeoncheol
- MR: Chŏng Hyŏnch'ŏl

Stage name
- Hangul: 서태지
- Hanja: 徐太志
- RR: Seo Taeji
- MR: Sŏ T'aeji
- Website: seotaiji.com

Signature
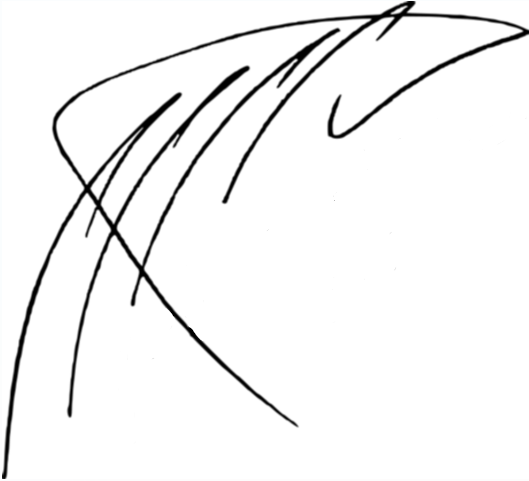

Jeong Hyeon-cheol (Korean: 정현철; born February 21, 1972), better known as Seo Taiji or Seo Tae-ji (서태지), is a South Korean singer, musician, songwriter and record producer. After dropping out of high school to pursue a music career, he rose to become one of the most prominent and influential cultural icons in South Korea, with many referring to him as "the President of Culture".

Following a brief stint in the heavy metal band Sinawe, Taiji formed Seo Taiji and Boys in 1991 with whom he found immediate success. Their style of music, dance, fashion, and self-presentation resonated with the young generation—termed the sinsedae, "new generation." They incorporated elements of popular musical genres from the West and contributed considerably larger to Korean pop culture and Korean pop's development in the 1990s. His songs addressed social and political concerns of the youth including the stressful and stifling system of education in Korea, and the rage of youth in the face of poor social and economic outlook. Widespread youth backlash to government suppression of the social commentary in his music became a catalyst for the abolishment of censorship of Korean popular music lyrics. His career paved the way for free expression in Korean pop music. Although he initially announced retirement upon disbanding the group in 1996, Taiji released his first solo album two years later and continued his successful career.

== Biography ==
=== Early career with Sinawe ===
At an early age, Jeong Hyeon-cheol had a fascination with music. At 14, he participated in several amateur rock bands. He took the stage name of "Seo Taiji" at age 17, when he was recruited into the heavy metal band Sinawe as bass guitarist by Shin Daechul. He chose to drop out of school because he felt that continuing to be enrolled in school would not be useful in pursuing a career in music.

=== Seo Taiji and Boys: 1992–1996 ===
Seo Taiji and Boys was a seminal South Korean boy band. Although also including Yang Hyun-suk and Lee Juno, Taiji was the leader and main songwriter and began his signature of mixing many different genres of music. They had several controversies with songs and lyrics, but became the first modern highly successful band in the South Korean music industry. The popularity of their music marked a departure from the trot style of music that previously dominated Korea's popular music scene.

=== Solo career: 1998–present ===
==== 1998: Seo Tai Ji ====
Two years after Seo Taiji and Boys' retirement, Taiji resumed his career as a musician and solo act, which has been and continues to be successful. He sought to return to his true roots and perform rock music. Without any appearances or activity in South Korea, he released an album with a couple of music videos in 1998. There was some controversy over his sudden reversal of retirement, but his first Solo album Seo Tai Ji sold more than a million copies, even without any promotion in Korea. His first solo work included heavy metal and nu metal songs, but the main genre was still alternative rock. Although it was his first solo work, fans refer to it as his 5th album.

==== 2000–2004: Ultramania and 7th Issue ====
In 2000, he returned to South Korea after a four-year absence. On the day of his arrival at the Kimpo International Airport in Seoul, the entire airport had been crowded by thousands of fans and media trying to get the first look at Seo Taiji.

He released the album Ultramania which consisted of nu metal and Hardcore punk. His solo act had an effect on many South Korean boy bands such as H.O.T. and caused them to decline in popularity. His songs "Internet War" and "Ultramania" were the biggest hits of the year. After the first ETPFEST in 2001, which he founded during his comeback, Taiji was presented with hide of X Japan's Fernandes MG-360S guitar, which is yellow with pink hearts, by hide's parents and his brother, Hiroshi, to celebrate the success of ETPFEST and the first hide showcase tribute ever at a Korean rock festival.

Seo Taiji maintained his nu metal sound in his third solo album, 7th Issue. However, unlike Ultramania, 7th Issue was recorded mostly on a dropped C tuning, which gave the effect of the album sounding like one long song. Nevertheless, it had no problem attracting attention to a wide range of audiences. 7th Issue's catchy rock tune made his fans call it "punk rock". Also, he obviously added Drum and Bass sound into his several songs, so that it proved him to be a favorable electronica musician (skills he learned from producing the "Seo Taiji and Boys" albums). J from Luna Sea also participated in the making of this album as the bassist. His song "Live Wire" was a good hit succeeding the vivacity of "Ultramania". "Robot" deals with his youth and anguish, while the song "F.M.Business" acrimoniously criticize the issues of and the commercialized music business and the artist exploitation from greedy corporate record labels. He also touches on the issue of abortion along with sexism and sexual assault with the song, "Victim". His record sale was reduced to a half million due to on-line downloading services, but was still the highest selling record of 2004 in South Korea. Taiji proved himself to be a musician in top popularity for more than a decade. After being active up to 2005, he once again suddenly disappeared out of the spotlight.

==== 2008–2009: 8th Atomos ====
Seo returned to South Korea after a long absence, and revealed his latest single "Moai". It was the first release of Seo Taiji's ambitious 3-part "mystery project", which was followed by another single, "Bermuda Triangle" which was put up as a digital single. The third part, Atomos Part Secret, was released on March 10. He had a promotion called "Missing Taiji", where there were false rumors that Taiji went missing, only to return on the "Wormhole" concert day. In his single "Moai", Taiji reinvents his sound, and introduces a new experimental style he calls "nature pound". "Moai" draws inspiration from the mysterious statues of Easter Island which had long fascinated him since his childhood. He performed at the 2008 ETPFEST which he spearheaded to promote his comeback alongside bands such as The Used, Dragon Ash, Death Cab for Cutie and Marilyn Manson.

Seo also put together "The Great Seotaiji Symphony" with Tolga Kashif and the Royal Philharmonic Orchestra to perform his old hits and new songs presented in an entirely new form, combining rock and classical music. The main concert was held at the Seoul World Cup Stadium. After the main concert, there were complaints about the sound quality not being delivered to the second and third floors at the further ends of the stadium and to make up for this mistake, another encore performance (same setlist) was held in December at a closed/indoor venue, Jamsil Gymnasium upgraded with better sound systems.

Seo's second single, following Atomos Part Moai, called Atomos Part Secret was released on March 10, 2009. It is the same date as the arrival of the Mars Reconnaissance Orbiter (MRO) to Mars in 2006. Taiji also held a concert promoting his second single on March 14 and 15. Tickets for the concert, cryptically titled Wormhole, sold out in just 20 minutes.

Seo's 15th anniversary album consisted of most of his works so far, re-recorded and re-mastered but it was released in a limited edition with only 15,000 copies available, each with unique serial numbers. Serial numbers #1–15 were purchased by Seotaiji himself. He kept No. 1 for himself, gave No. 2 and No. 3 to his old time friends Lee Juno and Yang Hyun Suk, and the rest to his close friends. Since the re-recorded and re-mastered songs were only available for the limited anniversary album and not all the fans were able to purchase it, he decided to re-release all the albums with the containing the new versions. On April 3, the first two Seo Taiji and Boys Albums were rereleased. Taiji will rerelease all 7 of his albums, from Nan Arayo! to 7th Issue. On May 25, the 3rd and 4th Seo Taiji and Boys albums were rereleased.

On June 13, Seo held a nationwide tour named "The Möbius". The first of the concerts was held in Seoul, Korea with Indie rock musician The Black Skirts as the opening act for the tour's Seoul show.The tour has ended, but a repeat performance was given 2 months after the finish. ETPFEST 2009 was also held with guest groups such as NIN, Limp Bizkit, Keane, Fade, Boom Boom Satellites, Pia and GUMX.

==== 2014–present: Quiet Night and 25th anniversary ====
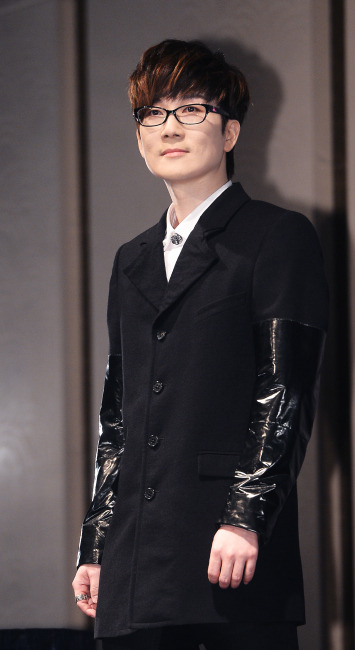
Seo on the day of Quiet Night's release

In 2013, Seo Taiji announced that he had been working on a new album. The first single from the new album, "Sogyeokdong", was released in October 2014. The single was released in two parts: first part, a collaboration with IU, was released October 2, and the second part on October 10. The album, Quiet Night, was released on October 20.

In April 2017 it was announced that Seo Taiji was assembling a group of modern K-Pop acts to cover songs from his past to celebrate the 25th anniversary of his debut with Seo Taiji and Boys. The first act announced for the project was BTS, with other acts including Urban Zakapa and Younha. The first single from this project, a cover of "Come Back Home" (from Seo Taiji and Boys IV) recorded by BTS, was released with a music video on July 5, 2017. The next song, a cover of "Moai" (from Atomos), was released on July 11, performed by Urban Zakapa.

== Personal life ==
On April 21, 2011, Sports Seoul broke the story (later confirmed by numerous media outlets) that Seo Taiji had secretly married actress Lee Ji-ah (real name Kim Sang-eun) from October 12, 1997, until August 9, 2006. Their union was kept secret because both Seo and Lee notoriously kept their personal lives hidden from the media. The couple first met in 1993, and after Seo temporarily retired in 1996, they got married in 1997 and lived in Atlanta and Arizona, until Seo's return to Korea in June 2000. They were separated since the return. Lee filed for divorce in the U.S. in 2006, citing both lifestyle and personality differences. According to Seo, the divorce was finalized in 2006, which Lee disputed, stating it had been 2009. In January 2011, Lee sued Seo for ₩5 billion of her share of matrimonial properties and ₩500 million in alimony, and court papers caused their relationship to go public in April. Seo's estimated worth at the time was reported between ₩40–50 billion ($35–44 million US). After a six-month lawsuit, an out-of-court settlement was reached on the alimony and division of assets in July 2011. In August 2014, Seo released a statement denying several of Lee's claims about their marriage when she made a guest appearance on the talk show Healing Camp, Aren't You Happy.

Seo married actress Lee Eun-sung, with whom he shares a sixteen-year age gap, on June 26, 2013, at Seo's newly built home in affluent Pyeongchang-dong in northern Seoul (he used to live in Yeonhui-dong), with only family members present. They met in 2008 when Lee appeared in the music video for "Bermuda Triangle" (on Seo's eighth album), and began dating in late 2009. Their first child, a daughter, was born on August 27, 2014.

== Seo Taiji Band ==
Although Taiji now works as a "solo" artist, the following musicians consistently play with him during tours, studio recordings, and music videos. Some of them belong to other bands, but they participated in recording and performances for a short period of time.:

- Top (Ahn Seong-hoon) – lead guitar
- Rock (Choi Chang-rok) – rhythm guitar
- Sang Uk (Monkey) – bass
- Heff "The Machine" Holter – drums
- Christopher "DJ Babu" Oroc - turntables for Seo's 6th album
- Kim Seok-jung (김석중) – keyboards/programming/samples/arrangement for Seo's 8th album
- Kang Joon-hyung (강준형) – bass for Seo's 8th and 9th albums. He normally works with the band "A'ccel in a story".
- Choi Hyun-jin (최현진) – drums for Seo's 8th and 9th albums. He normally works with the band "Vassline"
- Doc Skim (닥스킴) – keyboards for Seo's 9th album

== Discography ==
=== Studio albums ===
Title	Album details	Peak chart positions	Sales
Title	Album details	KOR	Sales
Seo Tai Ji	Released: July 7, 1998; Label: Samsung Music; Formats: CD, cassette	—	KOR: 1,133,736
Ultramania	Released: September 8, 2000; Label: Bando Records; Formats: CD, cassette	—	KOR: 1,300,000
7th Issue	Released: January 27, 2004; Label: Seo Taiji Company; Formats: CD, cassette	1	KOR: 482,066
8th Atomos	Released: July 1, 2009; Label: Seo Taiji Company; Formats: CD, cassette, streaming	—	KOR: 66,000
Quiet Night	Released: October 20, 2014; Label: Seo Taiji Company; Formats: CD, streaming	2	KOR: 42,705

=== Live releases ===
- Seotaiji Band Live Album 2000/2001 (2001)
- 6th Album Re-recording & ETPFEST Live (2003)
- Seotaiji Live Tour Zero '04 (2005)
- The Great Seotaiji Symphony (2009)
- 2009 Seotaiji Band Live Tour [The Möbius] (2010)

=== Singles and EPs ===
- Feel the Soul (2001, Single) (Japan-exclusive)
- 8th Atomos Part Moai (2008, EP)
- 8th Atomos Part Secret (2009, EP)

=== DVD ===
- Seo Taiji Live Tour '2000–2001: The Taiji Speaks (2001)
- Seo Taiji Live Tour Zero '04 DVD + Art Book (2004)
- 2004 Seo Taiji Record of the 7th (2005)
- The Shedding Bird: Seo Taiji Company DVD + Art Book (2005)
- The Great 2008 Seotaiji Symphony with Tolga Kashif & Royal Philharmonic (2010)
- Seotaiji Live Tour: The Möbius (2011)
- ETP Festival 08 09 Seo Taiji (2013)

=== Blu-ray ===
- The Great 2008 Seotaiji Symphony with Tolga Kashif & Royal Philharmonic (2010)
- Atomos: The Film (2011)
- Seotaiji Live Tour: The Möbius (2011)
- Seo Taiji Record of The 8th 398 (2012)

=== Box sets ===
- [&] Seotaiji 15th Anniversary Album Box Set (2007)

== Accolades ==
=== Awards and nominations ===
List of awards and nominations received by Seo Taiji
Award ceremony	Year	Category	Nominee / work	Result	Ref.
Mnet Asian Music Awards	2000	Best Rock Performance	"Ultramania"	Nominated	
Mnet Asian Music Awards	2000	Best Male Artist	"Ultramania"	Won	
Mnet Asian Music Awards	2004	Best Male Video	"Robot"	Nominated	
Mnet Asian Music Awards	2004	Best Rock Video	"Live Wire"	Won	
Mnet Asian Music Awards	2008	Best Male Artist	"Moai"	Won	
Mnet Asian Music Awards	2008	Best Rock Performance	"Moai"	Nominated	
Mnet Asian Music Awards	2008	Artist of the Year	Seo Taiji	Nominated	
Mnet Asian Music Awards	2009	Best Music Video	"Juliet"	Nominated	
Mnet Asian Music Awards	2009	Best Rock Performance	"Juliet"	Nominated	
Mnet Asian Music Awards	2014	Best Rock Performance	"Christmalo.win"	Nominated	
Mnet Asian Music Awards	2014	Best Music Video	"Christmalo.win"	Nominated	
Mnet Asian Music Awards	2014	Best Male Artist	"Christmalo.win"	Nominated	

=== Listicles ===
Name of publisher, year listed, name of listicle, and placement
Publisher	Year	Listicle	Placement	Ref.
Golden Disc Awards	2025	Golden Disc Powerhouse 40	Placed	
