= MAMA Award for Best Band Performance =

Award

Mnet Asian Music Award for Best Band Performance
- Awarded for: Quality band performances
- Country: South Korea
- Presented by: CJ E&M Pictures (Mnet)
- First award: 1999
- Currently held by: Day6 – "Maybe Tomorrow" (2025)
- Website: Mnet Asian Music Awards

The Mnet Asian Music Award for Best Band Performance (베스트 밴드 퍼포먼스) is an award presented annually by CJ E&M Pictures (Mnet). It was first awarded at the 1st Mnet Asian Music Awards ceremony held in 1999; the band Jaurim won the award for their song "Fall", and it is given in honor for the band with the most artistic achievement in band performances in the music industry.

The category was originally named "Best Rock Performance" from 1999 to 2009. Since then, it has changed to "Best Band Performance".

== Winners and nominees ==
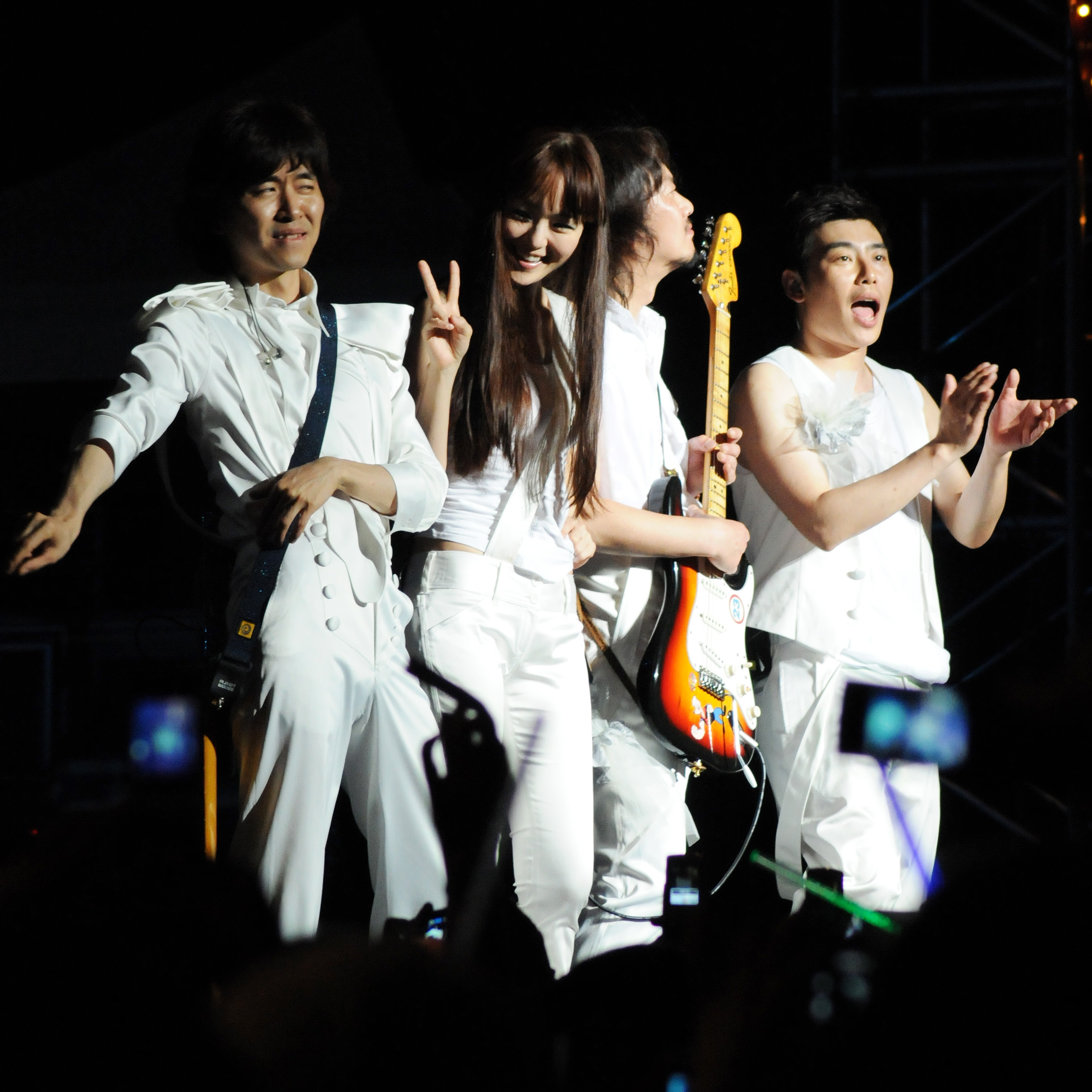
Jaurim, (1999, 2001)

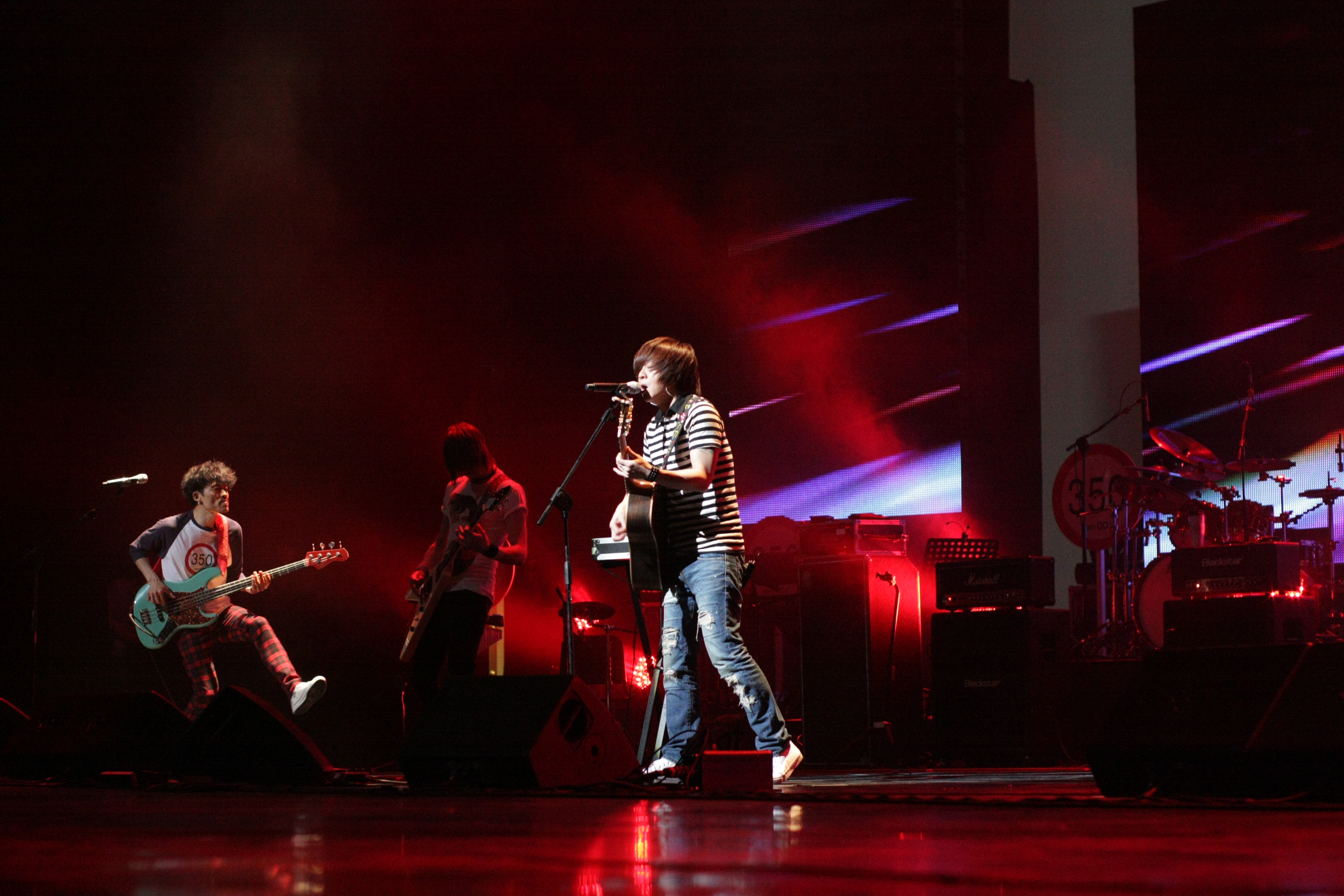
YB, (2002)

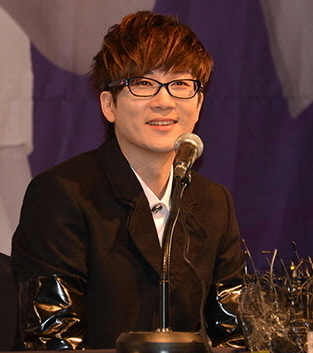
Seo Taiji, (2000, 2004)

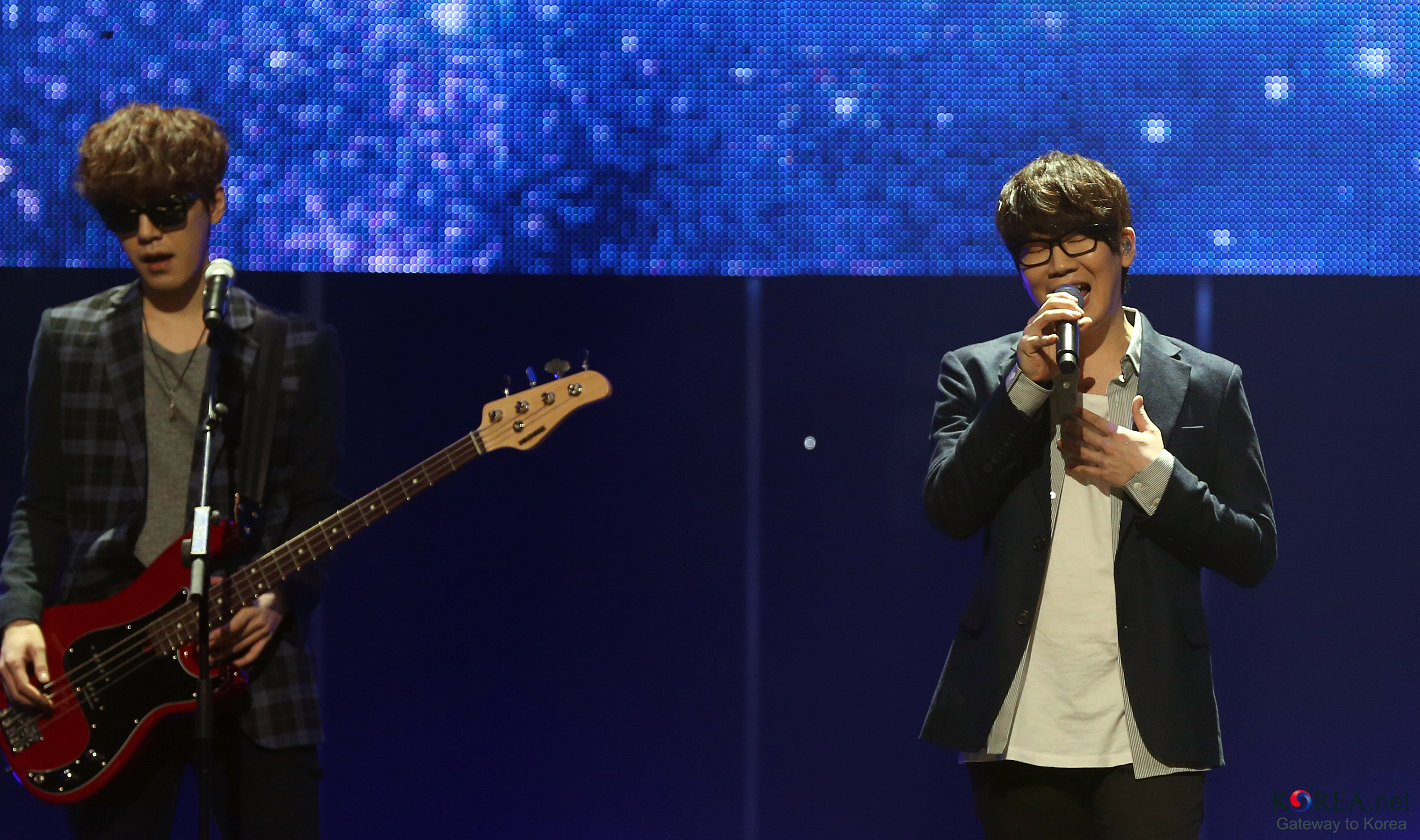
Nell, (2008)

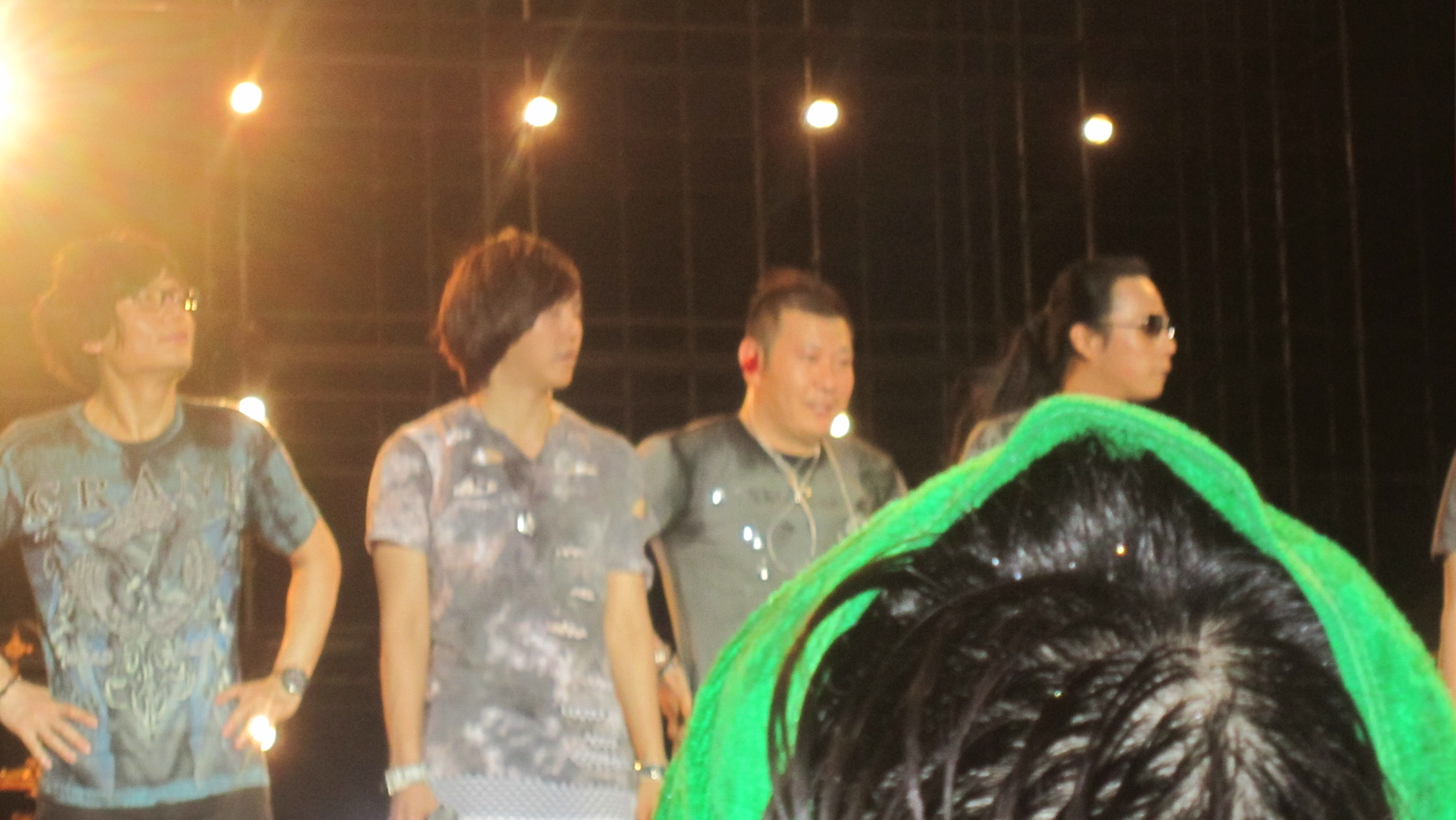
Boohwal, (2009)

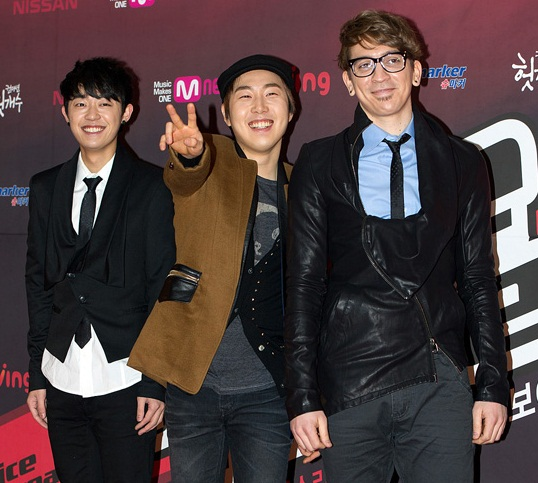
Busker Busker, (2012–13)

| Year^{[I]} | Performing artist(s) | Work | Nominees |
Best Rock Performance
| 1999 | Jaurim | "Fall (낙화)" | Kim Jong-seo - "Broken Hearted"; Novasonic - "Empire of the Sun"; Delispice - "Running bicycle (달려라 자전거)"; Red Plus - "Please Come Again Someday" (언젠가한번꼭한번) |
| 2000 | Seo Taiji | "Ultramania" | Kim Kyung-ho (김경호) - "Wine" (와인); Novasonic (노바소닉) - "Slam"; Delispice - "News About Cats & Birds (고양이와 새에 관한 신설)"; Jaurim - "Snake" (뱀) |
| 2001 | Jaurim | "Goodbye Grief" (파애) | Kim Kyung-ho - "Sacrifice" (희생); Roller Coaster - "Love Virus" (러브 바이러스); Seo Moon-tak - "All You Need Is Love" (사미인곡); Eve - "I'll Be There" |
| 2002 | YB | "Love Two" | Roller Coaster (를러코스터) - "Last Scene"; Boohwal - "Never Ending Story"; Jaurim - "That's it (삔이야)"; Cherry Filter - "Sweet Little Cat" (낭만고양이) |
| 2003 | Cherry Filter | "Flying Duck" | Butterfly Effect (나비효과) - "First Love" (첫사랑); Nell - "Stay"; Moon Hee-joon - "My Silent Conflict" (G 선상의 아리아); YB - "I'll Get Over You" (잊을께) |
| 2004 | Seo Taiji (Note: Titled as "Best Rock Video" award.) | "Live Wire" | N.E.X.T - "Growing Up"; TRAX - "Paradox"; Moon Hee-joon - "Paper Airplane"; Jaurim - "Hahaha Song" (하하하쏭) |
| 2005 | Buzz | "Coward" | Nell - "Thank You"; Moon Hee-joon - "A Small Village Called Memories"; YB - "It Must Have Been Love" (사랑했나봐); Jaurim - "Splendor Of Youth" (청춘예찬) |
| 2006 | Buzz | "You Don't Know Man" | Nell - "Losing My Mind" (마음을 잃다); Rumble Fish - "I Go"; YB - "Today" (오늘은); Cherry Filter - "Happy Day" |
| 2007 | Cherry Filter | "Feel It" | No Brain - "That Is Youth"; TransFixion - "Get Show"; Pia - "Black Fish Swim"; Nell - "It's Okay" |
| 2008 | Nell | "Time To Walk Memories" | Moon Hee-joon - "Obsession"; Seo Taiji - "Moai"; Jaurim - "Carnival Amour"; TransFixion - "Radio" |
| 2009 | Boohwal | "Thought" | Seo Taiji - "Juliet"; Kiha & The Faces - "Living Without Incidents"; Cherry Filter - "Pianissismo"; F.T. Island - "I Wish" |
Best Band Performance
| 2010 | Hot Potato | "Confession" | CNBLUE - "Love"; F.T. Island - "Love Love Love"; Boohwal - "Love Is"; TransFixion - "Shouts of Reds" |
| 2011 | CNBLUE | "Intuition" | Jaurim - "IDOL"; Kiha & The Faces - "Just Know Each Other"; F.T. Island - "Hello Hello"; YB - "Find the Dream Breaker" |
| 2012 | Busker Busker | "Cherry Blossom Ending" | 10cm - "Fine Thank You and You"; CNBLUE - "Hey You"; F.T. Island - "Severely"; Nell - "The Day Before" |
| 2013 | Busker Busker | "Love, At First" | Nell - "Ocean of Light"; DickPunks - "Viva Primavera"; Jaurim - "Twenty Five, Twenty One"; CNBLUE - "I'm Sorry" |
| 2014 | CNBLUE | "Can't Stop" | F.T. Island - "Madly"; Nell - "Four Times Around The Sun"; Seo Taiji - "Christmalo.win"; Jung Joon-young - "Teenager" |
| 2015 | CNBLUE | "Cinderella" | F.T. Island - "Pray"; Nell - "Green Nocturne"; JJY Band - "OMG"; Hyukoh - "Comes and Goes" |
| 2016 | CNBLUE | "You're So Fine" | 10cm – "What The Spring??"; DAY6 – "Letting Go"; FTISLAND – "Take Me Now"; Guckkasten – "Pulse" |
| 2017 | Hyukoh | "TOMBOY" | Day6 – "I Smile"; Buzz – "The Love"; CNBLUE – "Between Us"; F.T. Island – "Wind" |
| 2018 | Hyukoh | "Love Ya!" | Day6 – "Shoot Me"; Guckkasten – "Stranger"; Kiha & The Faces – "Cho Shim"; F.T. Island – "Summer Night's Dream" |
| 2019 | Jannabi | "For Lovers who Hesitate" | Day6 – "Time of Our Life"; M.C the MAX – "After you've Gone"; Nell – "Let's Part"; N.Flying – "Rooftop" |
| 2020 | Day6 | "Zombie" | M.C the Max - "Bloom"; N.Flying - "Oh Really!"; Leenalchi - "Tiger Is Coming"; Hyukoh - "Help" |
| 2021 | Jannabi | "A Thought on an Autumn Night" | 10cm – "Sleepless in Seoul"; CNBLUE – "Then, Now and Forever"; Day6 – "You Make Me"; N.Flying – "Moonshot" |
| 2022 | Xdinary Heroes | "Happy Death Day" | Jannabi – "Grippin' the Green"; Jaurim – "Stay with Me"; Lucy – "Play"; The Black Skirts – "My Little Lambs" |
| 2023 | No award given | | |
| 2024 | QWER | "T.B.H" | Day6 – "Welcome to the Show"; Hyukoh & Sunset Rollercoaster – "Young Man"; Lucy – "The Knight Who Can't Die and the Silk Cradle"; N.Flying – "Into You" |
| 2025 | Day6 | "Maybe Tomorrow" | CNBLUE - "A Sleepless Night"; N.Flying - "Everlasting"; QWER - "Dear"; Xdinary Heroes - "Beautiful Life" |

^{^[I]} Each year is linked to the article about the Mnet Asian Music Awards held that year.

== Multiple awards for Best Band Performance ==
As of 2025, eight (8) artists received the title two or more times.

| Artist(s) | Record Set | First year awarded | Recent year awarded |
|---|---|---|---|
| CNBLUE | 4 | 2011 | 2016 |
| Jaurim | 2 | 1999 | 2001 |
| Seo Taiji | 2 | 2000 | 2004 |
| Buzz | 2 | 2005 | 2006 |
| Cherry Filter | 2 | 2003 | 2007 |
| Busker Busker | 2 | 2012 | 2013 |
| Hyukoh | 2 | 2017 | 2018 |
| Jannabi | 2 | 2019 | 2021 |
| Day6 | 2 | 2020 | 2025 |
