= B2M Entertainment discography =

This is a complete list of albums released under B2M Entertainment. It is organized by year of release date and in chronological order.

== 2010 ==
Released	Title	Artist	Format	Language
April 12	H-Logic	Lee Hyori	CD, Digital Download	Korean

== 2011 ==
Released	Title	Artist	Format	Language
May 12	Let It Go	Heo Youngsaeng	CD, Digital Download	Korean
September 9	Turn Me On	Kim Kyujong	CD, Digital Download	Korean

== 2012 ==
Released	Title	Artist	Format	Language
February 8	Russian Roulette	Spica	CD, Digital Download	Korean
March 29	Painkiller	Spica	CD, Digital Download	Korean
May 22	Solo	Heo Youngsaeng	CD, Digital Download	Korean
July 18	Meet Me Again	Kim Kyujong	CD, Digital Download	Korean
September 19	Overjoyed	Heo Youngsaeng	CD, Digital Download	Japanese
September 19	I'll Be There	Spica	Digital Download	Korean
November 21	Lonely	Spica	CD, Digital Download	Korean

== 2013 ==
Released	Title	Artist	Format	Language
January 23	Cloud 9	Eric Nam	CD, Digital Download	Korean
March 13	Life	Heo Youngsaeng	CD, Digital Download	Korean
May 21	Monochrome	Lee Hyori	CD, Digital Download	Korean
July 3	Memories to You	Heo Youngsaeng	CD, Digital Download	Japanese
August 28	Tonight	Spica	Digital Download	Korean
October 16	She	Heo Youngsaeng	CD, Digital Download	Korean
October 17	Crazy Girl	Kim Bohyung	Digital Download	Korean

== 2014 ==
Released	Title	Artist	Format	Language
January 27	You Don't Love Me	Spica	Digital Download	Korean
April 7	Ooh, Ooh	Eric Nam	Digital Download	Korean
August 7	I Did It	Spica	Digital Download	English
September 12	Give Your Love	Spica.S	Digital Download	Korean
November 5	Ghost	Spica	Digital Download	Korean
November 19	First Romance	Nicole Jung	CD, Digital Download	Korean
December 10	Melt My Heart	Eric Nam	Digital Download	Korean

== 2015 ==
Released	Title	Artist	Format	Language
March 5	I'm Ok	Eric Nam	Digital Download	Korean
August 19	The Voice	SG Wannabe	CD, Digital Download	Korean
December 16	D-Make	Davichi	Digital Download	Korean

== 2016 ==
Released	Title	Artist	Format	Language
March 24	Interview	Eric Nam	CD, Digital Download	Korean
July 15	Can't Help Myself	Eric Nam ft. Loco	Digital Download	Korean
August 25	Secret Time	Spica	Digital Download	Korean
October 13	50 x Half	Davichi	CD, Digital Download	Korean
