= Girl Spirit =

- Promotional poster
- Genre: Reality competition
- Presented by: Jo Se-ho; Kim Sung-kyu (Infinite)
- Country of origin: South Korea
- Original language: Korean
- No. of seasons: 1
- No. of episodes: 11

Production
- Producer: Ma Gun-young
- Running time: 80–120 minutes

Original release
- Network: JTBC
- Release: July 19 – September 27, 2016

Girl Spirit (Korean: 걸스피릿) is a South Korean reality television singing competition that premiered on cable network JTBC on July 19, 2016. The aim of the show is to highlight the talents of the vocalists of twelve lesser-known girl groups that debuted in recent years. It airs every Tuesday at 22:50 (KST).

The contestants are ranked at the end of every episode based on their performances, and their scores will be accumulated over the course of twelve weeks to determine the top four contestants, two from each team. Each week select contestants' songs will be released digitally. The winner will receive a brand new car and the runner-up will get a family vacation to Saipan; both the winner's and the runner-up's final songs will also be released digitally.

== Format ==
Girl Spirit centers around twelve girl group vocalists who have yet to achieve mainstream success. Five "gurus" will judge their performances every week, as well as give them advice. In addition to the gurus, the contestants' performances will also be judged by 100 "listeners" – men and women who are studying music and have dreams of becoming singers themselves – for a total of 105 maximum points. Starting with episode two, the contestants' scores will be accumulated to determine the top 2 from each team, and the other team will also be judging the performances, making the maximum score 111.

There are two separate rounds in every episode. During the first round, each of the gurus, listeners, and opposite team members will have a device which they will use to cast their vote for the contestants whose performances they liked. After the last contestant performs, round two begins and the listeners must vote for the contestant they felt gave the best performance. The weekly rank is determined by the second round of votes. The contestant who comes in first place then chooses the order in which the members of that team will perform on their next episode.

The contestants are given a different theme for every performance. As an "unstated rule," contestants may perform a "pop song" (English language song), as well as have a "wild card" (featured artist) in a performance only once throughout the competition.

== Gurus ==
- Tak Jae-hoon
- Jang Woo-hyuk (H.O.T.)
- Chun Myung-hoon (NRG)
- Lee Ji-hye (S#arp)
- Seo In-young (Jewelry)

== Contestants ==
=== Team A ===
Contestant	Group	Debut Year	Featuring	Pop Song
Kei	Lovelyz	2014	Ep.9	
Min-jae	Sonamoo	2014	Ep.4	
Oh Seung-hee	CLC	2015	Ep.9	
Hyun Seung-hee	Oh My Girl	2015	EP.9	EP.11
Da-won	WJSN	2016	Ep.4	
Sung-yeon	Pristin	2016		Ep.9

=== Team B ===
Contestant	Group	Debut Year	Featuring	Pop Song
Bo-hyung	Spica	2012	Ep.5	Ep.11
Hye-mi	Fiestar	2012	Ep.10	
So-jung	Ladies' Code	2013		
Uji	Bestie	2013		Ep.3
So-yeon	Laboum	2014	Ep.10	Ep.10
Jin-sol	April	2015	Ep 10	

== Episodes ==
=== Episode 1: Preliminaries ===
- The twelve contestants were introduced in order of debut, starting with Bo-hyung, who debuted with Spica in January 2012, and ending with Sung-yeon, who debuted with Pledis Girlz in June 2016. Each contestant performed a song with their group followed by a solo song.
  - Voters: 105

Performances and round one results
Contestant	Order	Group song	Individual song (Original artist)	Score
Bo-hyung	1	"Tonight"	"Lonely Night" (Boohwal)	67
Hye-mi	2	"Apple Pie"	"If I Were You" (2NE1)	53
So-jung	3	"Galaxy"	"Don't Be Shy" (Primary)	72
Uji	4	"Excuse Me"	"8282" (Davichi)	78
So-yeon	5	"Journey to Atlantis"	"Where U At" (Taeyang)	40
Kei	6	"Destiny"	"Friday" (IU)	63
Min-jae	7	"I Like U Too Much"	"Nice to Meet You" (EX)	43
Oh Seung-hee	8	"No Oh Oh"	"I Will Survive" (Jinju)	50
Hyun Seung-hee	9	"Windy Day"	"Dream Girl" (Shinee)	86
Jin-sol	10	"Tinkerbell"	"Hey" (IU)	35
Da-won	11	"MoMoMo"	"Music Is My Life" (Lim Jeong-hee)	59
Sung-yeon	12	"We"	"In Dreams" (Lena Park)	68

Round two results
1. Hyun Seung-hee
2. Bo-hyung

=== Episodes 2 and 3: Fight Song ===
- Theme: Songs that inspired the competitors to pursue their dream of becoming singers or helped them during difficult times
  - Voters: 111

Team A performances and round one results
Contestant	Order	Song	Original artist	Score
Da-won	1	"Way to Go!"	Girls' Generation	83
Kei	2	"Atlantis Princess"	BoA	88
Oh Seung-hee	3	"Like a Fool"	Ivy	65
Min-jae	4	"Shout to Myself"	Maya	90
Hyun Seung-hee	5	"A Goose's Dream"	Insooni	87
Sung-yeon	6	"Just a Feeling"	S.E.S.	81

Team B performances and round one results
Contestant	Order	Song	Original artist	Score
Uji	1	"I Have Nothing"	Whitney Houston	102
Jin-sol	2	"Flying Duck"	Cherry Filter	81
So-jung	3	"1, 2, 3, 4"	Lee Hi	75
Hye-mi	4	"Hush"	Miss A	68
Bo-hyung	5	"The Unwritten Legend"	Shin Seung-hun	99
So-yeon	6	"Lady Camellia"	Lee Mi-ja	83

Round two results

Team A:

1. Min-jae
2. Kei
3. Hyun Seung-hee

Team B:

1. Uji
2. Bo-hyung
3. So-jung (tie)
  So-yeon (tie)

=== Episodes 4 and 5: Popular Songs ===
- Theme: Songs that were popular in the first half of the year
  - Voters: 111

Team A performances and round one results
Contestant	Order	Song	Original artist	Score
Da-won	1	"You're the Best" (Note: Featuring Cosmic Girls bandmate and I.O.I member Yeon-jung)	Mamamoo	94
Sung-yeon	2	"Memory of the Wind"	Na-ul	63
Hyun Seung-hee	3	"Cheer Up"	Twice	94
Oh Seung-hee	4	"Bang Bang Bang" (Note: Remixed with "Bang Bang" by Jessie J, Ariana Grande and Nicki Minaj)	Big Bang	68
Min-jae	5	"I" (Note: Featuring Sleepy)	Kim Tae-yeon	65
Kei	6	"Wild Flower"	Park Hyo-shin	90

Team B performances and round one results
Contestant	Order	Song	Original artist	Score
Bo-hyung	1	"Across the Universe" (Note: Featuring Flowsik)	Baek Ye-rin	104
So-yeon	2	"Wi Ing Wi Ing"	Hyukoh	63
Uji	3	"Love Me Right"	Exo	108
Hye-mi	4	"Rough"	GFriend	49
Jin-sol	5	"Woo Ah"	Crush	61
So-jung	6	"I Don't Love You"	Urban Zakapa	107

Round two results

Team A:

1. Hyun Seung-hee
2. Kei
3. Da-won

Team B:

1. So-jung
2. Bo-hyung (tie)
  Uji (tie)

=== Episode 6: Military Special ===
- Theme: Capturing the hearts of military men
  The contestants were paired up to perform for 400 soldiers. The duos consisted of one member from each team, with the possibility of having up to two other members of both groups join them.
  - Voters: 405

Performances and round one results
Contestants (Team name)	Order	Guest performers	Song(s)	Original artist(s)	Score
So-yeon & Min-jae (Presidents of the Military)	1	Laboum: ZN and Yul-hee; Sonamoo: Na-hyun and Eui-jin	"Heart Attack"	AOA	257
Bo-hyung & Oh Seung-hee (Daughters)	2	none	"Mom"	Ra.D	308
Uji & Kei (Bevelyz)	3	Bestie: Da-hye and Hye-yeon; Lovelyz: Ye-in and Su-jeong	"Twinkle" "Something"	Girls' Generation-TTS; Girl's Day	359
Hye-mi & Sung-yeon (Fiple)	4	Fiestar: Jei and Yezi; Pristin: Eunwoo and Roa	"Pick Me"	I.O.I	185
Jin-sol & Da-won (Unbeatably Innocent & Sexy)	5	April: Chae-won and Na-eun; Cosmic Girls: Exy and Cheng Xiao	"Touch My Body" "Mister"	Sistar; Kara	256
So-jung & Hyun Seung-hee (Oh My Lady)	6	Ladies' Code: Ashley and Zuny; Oh My Girl: YooA and Mimi	"24 Hours" "NoNoNo"	Sunmi; Apink	379

Round two results
1. So-jung & Hyun Seung-hee
2. Uji & Kei
3. Bo-hyung & Oh Seung-hee

=== Episodes 7 and 8: Legendary Songs ===
- Theme: Collaborating with legendary singers
  The gurus did not vote as they all collaborated with one of the contestants.
  - Voters: 106

Team A performances and round one results
Contestant	Order	Song(s)	Original artist(s)	Score
Sung-yeon (Note: Featuring S#arp's Lee Ji-hye, S#arp's Jang Seok-hyun and DinDin)	1	"100 Days Prayer"	S#arp	91
Da-won (Note: Featuring Clon's DJ Koo)	2	"Kung Ddari Sha Bah Rah"	Clon	86
Da-won	2	"Choryeon"	Clon	86
Da-won	2	"Nan"	Clon	86
Hyun Seung-hee (Note: Featuring Roo'ra's Chae Ri-na)	3	"Maybe I Love You"	Girl Friends	88
Hyun Seung-hee	3	"Lover"	Roo'ra	88
Oh Seung-hee (Note: Featuring NRG's Chun Myung-hoon and NRG's Noh Yoo-min)	4	"Hit Song"	NRG	80
Kei (Note: Featuring Country Kko kko's Tak Jae-hoon)	5	"Kiss"	Country Kko kko	102
Min-jae (Note: Featuring Cho PD)	6	"Friend"	Cho PD feat. Insooni	90

Team B performances and round one results
Contestant	Order	Song	Original artist	Score
Bo-hyung (Note: Featuring Hyun Jin-young)	1	"You in my Vague Memory"	Hyun Jin-young	97
Hye-mi (Note: Featuring Jewelry's Seo In-young)	2	"Goodbye Romance"	Seo In-young	90
Hye-mi	2	"One More Time"	Jewelry	90
So-yeon (Note: Featuring Brown Eyed Girls' JeA)	3	"A Midsummer Night's Dream"	Brown Eyed Girls	92
Uji (Note: Featuring H.O.T.'s Jang Woo-hyuk)	4	"Candy"	H.O.T.	92
Jin-sol (Note: Featuring Baby V.O.X.'s Lee Hee-jin & Snuper's Se-bin)	5	"Coincidence"	Baby V.O.X	81
So-jung (Note: Featuring 2AM's Chang-min)	6	"You Wouldn't Answer My Calls"	2AM	94

Round two results

Team A:

1. Kei
2. Hyun Seung-hee
3. Sung-yeon

Team B:

1. Bo-hyung
2. So-jung (tie)
  So-yeon (tie)

=== Episode 9 and 10: Thank You Song - Enter The Top 4 ===
- Theme:
  - Voters: 200

Team A performances and round one results
Contestant	Order	Song	Original artist	Score
Da-won	1	"Yanghwa Bridge"	Zion.T	158
Min-jae	2	"Mt. Chilgap"	Joo Byung Seon	148
Hyun Seung-hee	3	"Walking With" (Note: Featuring B1A4's Sandeul)	Kim Dong-ryool	148
Oh Seung-hee	4	"All for You" (Note: Featuring Sam Kim)	Seo In-guk & Jung Eun-ji	123
Kei	5	"As You Live"	Cha Ji-yeon	168
Sung-yeon	6	"Desperado"	Eagles	152

Team B performances and round one results
Contestant	Order	Song	Original artist	Score
Bo-hyung	1	"Friend"	Ahn Jae-wook	187
So-yeon	2	"A Moment Like This" (Note: Featuring The Ray)	Kelly Clarkson	152
Jin-sol	3	"Thanks" (Note: Featuring V.O.S's Choi Hyun-Joon)	Kim Dong-ryool	145
So-jung	4	"Bae Bae"	Big Bang	149
Hye-mi	5	"Etude of Memories" (Note: Featuring Jung Seung-hwan)	Jeon Ram Hui	149
Uji	6	"Road"	g.o.d	172

Round two results

Team A:

1. Kei (Lovelyz)
2. Da-won (Cosmic Girls)
3. Hyun Seung-hee (Oh My Girl)

Team B:

1. Bohyung (Spica)
2. Uji (BESTie)
3. Soyeon (Laboum)

=== Episode 11 : Final - Top 5 ===
Round 1
Contestant	Order	Song	Original artist	Score
Bo-hyung	1	"Caution"	Tashannie	84
Uji	2	"U-Go-Girl"	Lee Hyori	78
Kei	3	"Western Sky"	Lee Seung-chul	70
Hyun Seung-hee	4	"I Want You Back"	The Jackson 5	79
Hyun Seung-hee	4	"Billie Jean"	Michael Jackson	79
Hyun Seung-hee	4	"Man in the Mirror"	Michael Jackson	79
So-jung	5	"One's Way Back"	Park Seon Joo	80

Round 2
Contestant	Order	Song	Original artist	Score †
Bo-hyung	1	"Who You Are"	Jessie J	89
Uji	2	"For 1000 Days"	Lee Seung-hwan	≤ 81
Kei	3	"Deviation"	Jaurim	≤ 89
Hyun Seung-hee	4	"If You Come Into my Heart"	Jo Deok Bae	81
Hyun Seung-hee	4	"Rum Pum Pum Pum"	f(x)	81
Hyun Seung-hee	4	"Abracadabra"	Brown Eyed Girls	81
Hyun Seung-hee	4	"Happiness"	Red Velvet	81
Hyun Seung-hee	4	"Russian Roulette"	Red Velvet	81
So-jung	5	"Heeya"	Lee Seung-chul	≤ 79

Final results
1. Bohyung (Spica)
2. Hyun Seung-hee (Oh My Girl)

† The combined points totals for Rounds 1 and 2 of the final episode were revealed for only the top two finishers; the winner received 173 points and the runner-up received 160, meaning the algebraic upper limit for the other three finalists is ≤159 points.

== Music ==
- "Idol Vocal League - Girl Spirit Episode 02"
1. "Shout to Myself" (Min-jae) – 3:16
2. "Atlantis Princess" (Kei) – 4:04
3. "Don't Be Shy" (So-jung) – 2:13
- "Idol Vocal League - Girl Spirit Episode 03"
1. "I Have Nothing" (Uji) – 4:09
2. "The Unwritten Legend" (Bo-hyung) – 3:30
3. "Lady Camellia" (So-yeon) – 3:42
- "Idol Vocal League - Girl Spirit Episode 04"
1. "Cheer Up" (Hyun Seung-hee) – 4:22
2. "You're the Best" (Da-won ft. Yeon-jung) – 3:48
- "Idol Vocal League - Girl Spirit Episode 05"
1. "I Don't Love You" (So-jung) – 4:40
2. "Across the Universe" (Bo-hyung ft. Flowsik) – 4:14
3. "Woo Ah" (Jin-sol) – 3:24
- "Idol Vocal League - Girl Spirit Episode 06"
1. "24 Hours + NoNoNo" (So-jung and Hyun Seung-hee) – 4:47
2. "Twinkle + Something" (Uji and Kei) – 4:14
3. "Mom" (Bo-hyung and Oh Seung-hee) – 3:52
- "Idol Vocal League - Girl Spirit Episode 07"
1. "Kiss" (Tak Jae-hoon and Kei) – 4:52
2. "Maybe I Love You + Lover" (Chae Ri-na and Hyun Seung-hee) – 5:44
3. "100 Days Prayer" (Lee Ji-hye and Sung-yeon) – 3:55
- "Idol Vocal League - Girl Spirit Episode 08"
1. "A Midsummer Night's Dream" (So-yeon and JeA) – 3:47
2. "Goodbye Romance" (Hye-mi and Seo In-young) – 3:09
- "Idol Vocal League - Girl Spirit Episode 09"
1. "As You Live" (Kei) – 5:48
2. "Desperado" (Sung-yeon) – 3:55
3. "Mt. Chilgap" (Min-jae) – 3:47
- "Idol Vocal League - Girl Spirit Episode 10"
1. "Friend" (Bo-hyung) – 4:32
2. "Road" (Uji) – 4:24
3. "A Moment Like This" (So-yeon ft. The Ray) – 3:55
- "Idol Vocal League - Girl Spirit Episode 11"
1. "Caution" (Bo-hyung) – 4:02
2. "Who You Are" (Bo-hyung) – 4:26
3. "One's Way Back" (So-jung) – 4:52
4. "Deviation" (Kei) – 4:31
5. "U-Go-Girl" (Uji) – 3:40

== Ratings ==
In the table below, the blue numbers represent the lowest ratings and the red numbers represent the highest ratings.

Episode #	Original broadcast date	AGB Nielsen Nationwide Ratings
1	July 19, 2016	1.386%
2	July 26, 2016	1.069%
3	August 2, 2016	1.187%
4	August 9, 2016	0.994%
5	August 16, 2016	0.730%
6	August 23, 2016	1.026%
7	August 30, 2016	0.920%
8	September 6, 2016	1.014%
9	September 13, 2016	0.793%
10	September 20, 2016	0.670%
11	September 27, 2016	0.937%
