= Turn Me On (Kim Kyu-jong EP) =

- Turn Me On cover

EP by Kim Kyu-jong
- Released: 27 September 2011
- Genres: K-pop, R&B, Dance
- Language: Korean
- Labels: LOEN Entertainment; Warner Music Taiwan
- Producer: B2M Entertainment

Kim Kyu-jong chronology
Turn Me On (2011)	Meet Me Again (2012)

Music video
- "Yesterday" on YouTube "Yesterday Dance Version" on YouTube

Turn Me On is the Korean solo mini album debut of Kim Kyu-jong of South Korean boy band SS501. It was released on September 27, 2011 under B2M Entertainment and distributed by LOEN Entertainment. On October 28, the album was also released in Taiwan by Warner Music Taiwan.

== Background and development ==
Following the other four members of SS501, Kim was the last to debut as a solo artist after he left his former agency DSP Media in October 2010. While the other members released their own solo albums in the early 2011 one by one, Kim was concentrating on his acting career. Since their last album Destination in 2010, the only time that Kim got active in music was during his and Heo Young-saeng's Kyu Jong & Young Saeng Story joint fan meeting in Seoul and other countries across Asia. Kim was also featured in Heo's debut solo album Let It Go in the song "Rainy Heart", though he was not seen in the music video.

On September 19, B2M Entertainment announced Kim Kyu-jong music comeback with the release of his own solo album. During this time, Kim had been busy with his Goong musical, a spin-off of the Korean television drama of the same title, at the Kyoto Minami-za, Japan. Nevertheless, Kim participated in the album's concept and song production. On the same day, photo teasers for his upcoming album were released.

On September 22, a 34-second video teaser of his titular single "Yesterday" was released through B2M Entertainment's official YouTube account. The story-line of the video involves Kim's unpleasant relationship with a woman.

== Release and promotion ==
Five days after the video teaser's release, the agency officially released Turn Me On album and the music video for Kim's lead single "Yesterday" through its official YouTube channel on September 27. The album was also released in Taiwan by Warner Music Taiwan later on October 28. It comes with two versions: Limited Edition and Deluxe Edition with a bonus DVD.

The album contains five songs including the mid tempo dance lead track "Yesterday" (부제: 어제보다 슬픈 오늘...), a high tempo dance track "My Love" featuring rap by fellow member Heo Young Saeng, and R&B track of "Get Ya' Luv" with an acoustic version of it. The overall album was co-produced by Taewan and Han Sang Won, who also participated with SS501's "U R Man".

For the music video, the video features Yang Jiwon, a member of the pre-debut girl-group of the same company called Spica. On October 24, B2M Entertainment released a dance version of "Yesterday" uploaded onto their official YouTube account. The video features the dance of the single, emphasizing its suspender dance move.

It's thanks to people. I realized that there are still many people who care about me. I made the decision to work really hard thanks to people to whom I feel really thankful towards. I used to complain when I had many things to do, but now I try to enjoy it.

The album debuted at number three on Gaon Album Chart for the week starting on September 25, 2011. It then reaches the tenth and eighty-second spots on the Monthly and Yearly Charts respectively.

Two days after the release of his mini album, Kim Kyu-jong revealed during an interview that he almost quit the music industry. Despite that his disposition was generally considered cheerful, he said that he was disheartened by the words and actions of others. Nevertheless, he continued performing after receiving encouragement from his fans and friends, particularly his label-mate and fellow member Heo Young-saeng. Being the last SS501 to release a solo album, Kim stated that he tried not to feel pressured, and decided to work at his own pace.

=== Music shows ===
Kim Kyu-jong had his first comeback stage on September 29 on Mnet's M!Countdown, performing his lead single "Yesterday". He also performed on KBS' Music Bank and SBS' Inkigayo.

== Artwork ==
An example of Kim Kyu-jong's photo teasers.

On September 19, Kim Kyu-jong released photo teasers of him for his upcoming album. The photos (e.g. image on the right) show Kim Kyu-jong in a heavy white make-up with white-dyed hair before a white background. Initially, mixed reaction from the crowd and various online communities were heard and seen, from curiosity to criticisms. B2M Entertainment stated during his pre-release album: "Kim Kyu Jong participated in the concept meetings and song production himself to show a new image never seen before in his new album. The photos from his album revealed today also reflect this strong will."

On September 29, two days after the album release, Kim Kyu-jong said that the photos would get the attention of people whether their reactions are positive or negative. In addition, he said that the reason why he dressed as a woman represents two things: breaking-off from the inside to show his own colors on the outside and; putting one's own image to the person he or she likes. For the latter, he particularly mentioned the struggles of women in grooming their outer appearances to look good. Despite his initial plans of looking like a woman, however, he stated that he looked more of a transvestite. Regarding the cover art, he wanted to make sure the look was different than anything he had done during SS501 days. He explained:

Even though it would be great to hear many nice words about it but getting away from that, I thought that I should do something that I have never done before, and it attracted many people's attention on it... Even then, I think they will say 'What's this?' when they see the photo. Besides cursing over the photo, I am thankful simply that they found and saw the photo.

== Track listing ==
No.	Title	Lyrics	Music	Length
1.	"No More Yes"	Kim Tae-wan, HAN	Kim Tae-wan, 251, high J	3:24
2.	"Yesterday"	Lee Ji-eun, Han Sang-won	Han Sang-won	3:28
3.	"My Love" (Ft. Heo Young-saeng (YS))	Kim Tae-wan	Jimmy Richard, Joleen Belle, Joachim Svare, Kim Hansen	3:21
4.	"Get Ya' Luv"	Kim Tae-wan, HAN	Kim Tae-wan, 251	3:19
5.	"Get Ya' Luv" (Acoustic Version)	Kim Tae-wan, HAN	Kim Tae-wan, 251	2:50

Taiwan CD+DVD Deluxe Edition: Bonus DVD
No.	Title	Length
1.	"Interview"
2.	"Speed Quiz"

== Music videos ==
- "Yesterday"
- "Yesterday dance version"

== Release history ==
Country	Date	Distributing label	Format
South Korea	27 September 2011	B2M Entertainment; LOEN Entertainment	CD
Worldwide	27 September 2011	B2M Entertainment	digital download
Taiwan	28 October 2011	Warner Music Taiwan	Limited Edition (CD)
Taiwan	28 October 2011	Warner Music Taiwan	Deluxe Edition (CD+DVD)

== Charts ==
Chart	Country	Period	Peak position	Notes/Ref
Gaon Single Chart	South Korea	25 September - 1 October 2011	53	"Yesterday"
Gaon Weekly Album Chart	South Korea	25 September - 1 October 2011	3	
Gaon Monthly Album Chart	South Korea	September	10	12,826 copies
Gaon Yearly Chart	South Korea	2011	85	18,735 copies
G-Music Combo Chart	Taiwan	Week 44 (28 October - 3 November 2011)	6	1.49% sales
G-Music J-Pop/K-Pop Chart	Taiwan	Week 44 (28 October - 3 November 2011)	1	11.82% sales
Five Music J-Pop/K-Pop Chart	Taiwan	Week 44 (28 October - 3 November 2011)	2	8.59% sales
