= Miss Korea (disambiguation) =

Miss Korea is a South Korean beauty pageant.

Miss Korea may also refer to:

- "Miss Korea" (Lee Hyori song), 2013
- Miss Korea (TV series), a South Korean television series
