= You Don't Love Me =

You Don't Love Me may refer to:

- "You Don't Love Me (True)", a song by Louis Cottrell Jr. with Don Albert and Lloyd Glenn
- "You Don't Love Me" (Willie Cobbs song), 1960
- "You Don't Love Me" (The Kooks song), 2006
- "You Don't Love Me" (Spica song), 2014
- "You Don't Love Me", a song by Stephanie McIntosh from Tightrope
- "You Don't Love Me (No, No, No)", a song by Dawn Penn; first version in 1967 then re-recorded in 1994
- "You Don't Love Me" (Sickotoy song), 2019
