= Honey G =

Honey G may refer to:

- Honey G (rapper), English rapper and The X Factor contestant
- Honey G (band), South Korean boy band
