= Soul People =

Soul People may also refer to:

- Soul People (album), 1965 album by Sonny Stitt With Booker Ervin and Don Patterson
- Soul People (band), South Korean vocal group formed in 2012
