= Seo Ji-young =

South Korean singer (born 1981)

- Born: June 2, 1981 (age 45)
- Genre: K-pop
- Occupation: Singer
- Years active: 1998–2007
- Formerly of: Sharp

Korean name
- Hangul: 서지영
- Hanja: 徐智英
- RR: Seo Jiyeong
- MR: Sŏ Chiyŏng

Seo Ji-young (Korean: 서지영; born June 2, 1981) is a South Korean former singer. She was formerly a member of pop group Sharp. The group released six albums before their breakup in 2002, attributed to the scandal resulting from discovery of bullying by Seo of fellow female member Lee Ji-hye.

She is daughter of Seo Guk-hwan and his wife Jo Eun-joo. Her father is the 19th president of Yonsei University, and Minister of Land, Infrastructure and Transport during President Park Geun-hye's administration (2013–17). Her paternal grandfather, from the large Seo family of Dalseong, was Seo Jeon-chul (1924–2010), 20th Minister of National Defense of South Korea, and president of the Korea Baseball Association.

Sharp was a group that was created by member Seo Jiyoung's influential family, who at the time was one of the wealthiest in the industry.

As a solo artist, she has released two albums, with her last one released in January 2007. Her singles include "Stay in Me" and "Hey Boy".

Seo is married to financier Kim Kyung-gu, who is five years her senior. More than one thousand guests attended their wedding on November 10, 2011, at the Shilla Hotel in Seoul, South Korea.

== Discography ==
=== Sharp albums ===
- the sharp (1998)
- the sharp +2 (1999)
- The Four Letter Word Love (2000)
- 4ever Feel So Good (2001)
- Flat Album (2001)
- Style (2002)

=== Solo albums ===
- Listen to My Heart (2005)
- Different This Time (2007)

=== Music videos ===
- "Stay in Me"
- "Hey Boy"
- "Fatigued"

== Filmography ==
=== TV appearance ===
- X-man (SBS)
- Real Romance: Love Letter (SBS)
- I'm Sorry, I Love You (KBS, 2004)
