= Meet Me Again =

- Meet Me Again cover

EP by Kim Kyu-jong
- Released: 18 July 2012
- Genre: K-pop
- Length: 14:37
- Language: Korean
- Label: LOEN Entertainment; Warner Music Taiwan
- Producer: B2M Entertainment

Kim Kyu-jong chronology
Turn Me On (2011)	Meet Me Again (2012)

Music video
- "My Precious One" on YouTube

Meet Me Again is the second Korean solo mini album of Kim Kyu-jong of South Korean boy band SS501. It was released as a limited edition on July 18, 2012, by B2M Entertainment and distributed by LOEN Entertainment. The album was released in Taiwan by Warner Music Taiwan on August 17, 2012, with a bonus DVD.

== Background and development ==
On June 1, Kim Kyu-jong wrote a letter to his fans about his plans to enlist early. Later on the same day, B2M Entertainment verified Kim's initial announcement that he will be fulfilling his mandatory military service starting in July. The agency's representative stated: "He could've postponed the date, but he decided that it would be better to serve his duties first and then continue promoting with that out of the way. He'll serve well and stay healthy so that he'll come back as a better person after his release." The next day, the company announced Kim's exact date and place for his enlistment. He would be heading to Jeonju on July 23 for a four-week army training.

Two days after the first announcement, he held his farewell fanmeeting Thank U ThanKYU with Triple S on June 3 at the Yonsei University in Sinchon-dong, Seoul. This marked his last official activity before his enlistment in July, as well as the first time in over two years that the five members of SS501 had gathered together. It was reported that the four other members fixed their schedules to attend the event. In particular, Heo Young-saeng rushed there after his "Crying" live performance on Inkigayo, while Kim Hyun Joong went there straight ahead after his fan meeting overseas. During the fan meeting, Kim sang his pre-release track "Thank You".

Before enlisting, however, Kim would be releasing a special album to his fans. The album would be his second mini-album after Turn Me On in 2011. The upcoming album Meet Me Again would be a dedication towards his fans. The title speaks for itself; it is his way of saying to wait for him and meet him again in two years, which he previously stated in his letter on June 1.

== Album release and enlistment ==
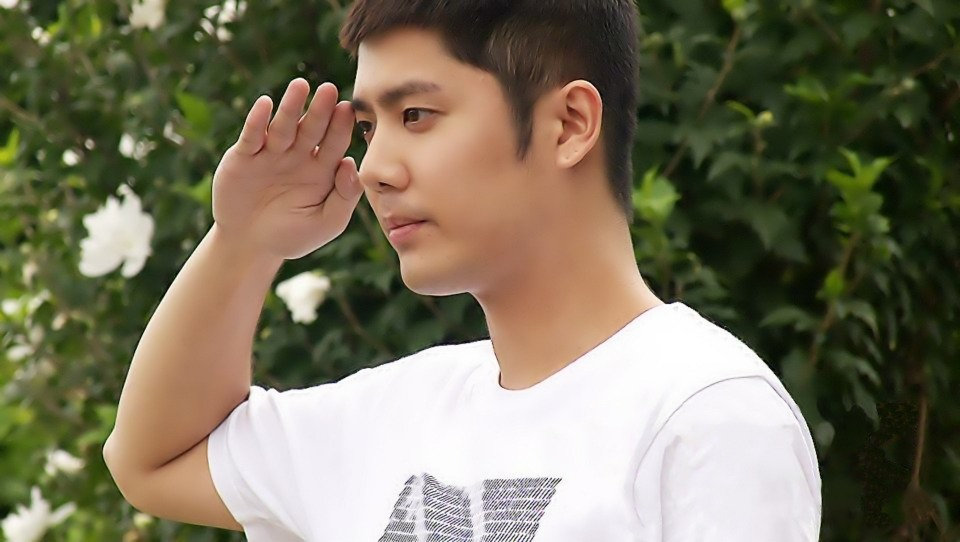
Kim Kyu Jong in Jeonju, North Jeolla Province on July 23, 2012, five days after Meet Me Again release.

On July 18, Kim released a limited edition mini-album Meet Me Again dedicated to his fans. It features three tracks including "Thank You" composed by Kim, himself and "One Luv", a duet with Mighty Mouth's Shorry J, composed by Tae Wan Kim a.k.a. C-Luv. Along with the album, a three-minute music video of "My Precious One" was also uploaded on B2M Entertainment's official YouTube account.

As said earlier, Kim's last official activity was held during his farewell fanmeeting on June 3. Due to limited of time until the enlistment day, Kim was not able to promote his album and perform his songs. Despite its lack of promotions, however, the album peaked at #5 at Gaon Weekly Album Chart starting on July 15 to 21.

On July 23, Kim reported to the recruit training center of the 35th division in Jeonju, North Jeolla Province for four weeks of basic training. He was originally exempted because he had a hepatitis B carrier, but due to a change in conscription law, he was eligible to serve the non-active duty as a public service worker. He was the first member of SS501 to enlist.

== Tracks ==
The tracks of Kim Kyu-jong's album can be seen as his gratitude and love towards his fans. The lead single of his album entitled "My Precious Person" is about him missing his 'precious person' after separating, while "One Luv" speaks about his mutual feelings towards his fans. In the same way, "Thank You", which features his solo fanclub "ThanKYU", was penned by himself to show his gratefulness towards his fans.

=== Track listing ===
No.	Title	Lyrics	Music	Arrangement	Length
1.	"My Precious Person" (소중한 사람)	Kim Tae-wan, Kim Kyu-jong	Kim Tae-wan, Kwon Sung-min	Kwon Sung-min	03:29
2.	"One Luv" (Duet with Taewan a.k.a. C-Luv, Ft. Shorry J)	Kim Tae-wan	Kim Taw-wan, Stay Tuned A, B	Stay Tuned A, B	03:18
3.	"고마워 (Thank You)" (Ft. ThanKYU)	Kim Kyu-jong	Kim Kyu-jong, Kim Tae-wan	Kim Tae-wan, Yoon Sang-jo	04:19
4.	"소중한 사람 (Precious Person)" (Instrumental)		Kim Tae-wan, Kwon Sung-min	Kwon Sung-min	03:29
Total length:					14:37

Taiwan CD+DVD Edition: Bonus DVD
No.	Title	Length
1.	"소중한 사람 (Precious Person) MV"
2.	"Kyu-jong before joining the military"
3.	"A special visit"

== Music video ==
The music video for "My Precious One" was uploaded to YouTube on July 18, 2012. The three-minute, 33-second video was filmed outdoors in a summer day.

In the video, shoots of Kim singing and strolling around the area appear. It is inferred that he was with someone, though the person with him is not shown in the camera. Other parts of the person's body, such as the hands and feet, are shown sometimes to act out the scenes. He constantly looks in front of the camera as well to talk to the person. At one point, he is seen dancing the steps of SS501's previous songs such as "Warning", "A Song Calling for You", and "UR Man", bringing back the memories of him with SS501.

The last scene shows Kim sitting on the bench as he gazes through the camera; both the song title and his name in Korean are superimposed in the background.

== Release history ==
Country	Date	Distributing label	Format
South Korea	July 18, 2012	B2M Entertainment; LOEN Entertainment	CD
Worldwide	July 18, 2012	B2M Entertainment	digital download
Taiwan	August 17, 2012	Warner Music Taiwan	CD+DVD

== Charts ==
Chart	Country	Peak position
Gaon Weekly Album Chart	South Korea	5
Gaon Monthly Album Chart	South Korea	16
G-Music Combo Chart	Taiwan	18
G-Music J-Pop Chart	Taiwan	3
Five Music J-Pop/K-Pop Chart	Taiwan	3
