= Monochrome (Lee Hyori album) =

Studio album by Lee Hyori
- Released: May 21, 2013
- Recorded: 2011–2013
- Genre: K-pop
- Length: 55:28
- Language: Korean
- Label: B2M; CJ E&M
- Producer: Lee Hyori; Kim Ji-woong

Lee Hyori chronology
H-Logic (2010)	Monochrome (2013)	Black (2017)

Singles from Monochrome
- 1. "Miss Korea" Released: May 6, 2013; 2. "Bad Girls" Released: May 21, 2013

Monochrome (stylized in all caps) is the fifth studio album by South Korean singer-songwriter Lee Hyori. It was released on May 21, 2013, by B2M Entertainment and distributed by CJ E&M Music. The album, which has an analogue sound and retro feel, departs from her previous style of music. It is her first full-length release after a three-year hiatus since H-Logic (2010).

Unlike her previous work, Lee collaborated with foreign composers such as Norwegian songwriting team Dsign Music, who previously composed Girls' Generation's "Tell Me Your Wish (Genie)" and "I Got a Boy". She also worked with blues musician Kim Tae-chun, and her then-boyfriend Lee Sang-soon for the new record. (Note: They married on September 1, 2013.) Beenzino, a member of hip-hop duo Jazzyfact, Bak Ji-yong from vocal trio Honey G, comedian Ahn Young-mi, and Lee's companion dog Soonshim participated on the album as featured artists.

The album sold about 17,000 physical copies and 2.75 million digital tracks in 2013, making it the 79th best-selling Korean album of that year. (Note: Sales for both normal and special limited editions are combined.) Lee bounced back as a musician thanks to the album's success, winning the award for Best Female Artist at 2013 Mnet Asian Music Awards.

== Background ==
Lee's comeback was pushed back multiple times throughout 2012, until it was finally announced that she would return to the stage with her fifth studio album in May 2013. While recording, many rumors floated around on what the album would sound like. Lee rejected the rumors when she tweeted and urged people "not to be deceived by any of fake information about the album", on February 7, 2013. Two days later, she posted on her official fan club, asking fans "not to be bored even if there would be more than 10 tracks in her new album". Lee stated that she felt the "greed" to create an album with weighty quality.

Unlike her previous work, it was reported that she collaborated with foreign composers for the new record. According to an official from B2M Entertainment, Lee's agency, Monochrome will contain a number of acoustic and easy listening songs instead of her previous style of electronic pop music. However, the official also stated that the singer has made an effort to reach the nexus between her and the listeners by choosing a dance tune with a powerful group choreography as the title track of her album.

== Release ==
On May 9, it was announced that the singer's fifth full-length album would be titled Monochrome, and its album cover was unveiled. Beginning on the same day, a normal edition and a special limited edition of the album were available for pre-order. Limited to 5,000 copies, the latter features a 156-page photo book, and was all sold out. Monochrome contains a total of sixteen tracks, including the lead single "Bad Girls", the self-composed hit "Miss Korea", and "Show Show Show", a cover of "No No No" originally performed by German pop trio Monrose.

Monochrome was released both digitally and physically on May 21, 2013. The album peaked at number four on the Gaon Albums Chart. As of September 2025, Monochrome has sold about 17,000 copies in South Korea, with the sales of both editions combined.

=== Teasers ===
Vogue Korea announced that Lee would introduce her new song through "Show Girl", a fashion music video of her recent photo shoot with the magazine on April 19, 2013. With the concept of a circus show girl, she donned several sexy outfits in the middle of nowhere, surrounded by abandoned circus sets and props. "Show Girl" was sequentially released on the first of May via Vogue Korea's iPad app, the magazine's website, and then its YouTube channel. According to Lee's agency, the background music for the video was titled "Show Show Show" (Korean: 쇼쇼쇼; RR: Shoshosho), which is a cover of Monrose's "No No No".

Lee Hyori uploaded a photo via her official Twitter on April 22, 2013, with the sentence "I used to be the sweetest girl ever... 'til I found out being the baddest girl was better" superimposed onto it. Five video teasers were released for the album through B2M Entertainment's YouTube channel at noon the following day. Under the theme of "What Are You Doing, Hyori?" (뭐 하니? 효리; Mwo Hani? Hyori), the series of teasers featured footage from Lee's daily life, and recording sessions and photo shoots for Monochrome, with the sound of brass instruments played as background music.

== Singles ==
=== "Miss Korea" ===
A music video teaser for "Miss Korea" (미스코리아; Miseukoria), a pre-release single from the album, was unveiled on May 2, 2013. The video directed by South Korean music video director Cha Eun-taek, and the single itself was released four days later. The self-composed song contains the message of comfort and hope, comparing all women to Miss Korea, as the end of the song follows, "Are others' eyes that important? / Does it feel like it's your fault when something goes bad? / No, it's not like that, come here / It'll be okay, you're a Miss Korea". The lyrics was later donated to the Hangang Bridge, as part of "the Bridge of Life" project promoted by Samsung Life Insurance.

Upon its release, "Miss Korea" debuted at number one on both the Gaon Singles and Download Charts. It peaked at number three on the Billboard Korea K-Pop Hot 100 for the week of May 25, 2013. As of September 2025, "Miss Korea" has sold about a million digital copies in South Korea. Lee personally selected 30 non-celebrity women "with love and respect for themselves" who she saw as the genuine "Miss Korea"s, to perform the song together on stage at the 2013 SBS Gayo Daejeon televised concert. Jessica Jung, former member of girl group Girls' Generation, covered this song at the concert SM Town Week Girls' Generation – Märchen Fantasy.

=== "Bad Girls" ===
The album's lead single "Bad Girls" is a dance tune only consisted of acoustic band sound. Lee's self-written lyrics depicts the reality, in which confident women are considered "bad". CJ E&M Music, the distributor of the album, released a video teaser for the track on May 15, 2013. As a parody of SBS's current affair program The Its Know, the teaser stimulates curiosity through narrations such as "Why did Lee Hyori become a bad girl?" and "From now on, we're going to unleash the truth about her". Lee spoofs Sharon Stone's interrogation scene from the 1992 film Basic Instinct. According to the singer's agency, two versions of the music video, a story-centered one and a choreography-centered one, would be released. The former features cameo appearances from designer Yoni P, Gil of Leessang, model Jang Yoon-ju, Spica member Ju-hyun, and actress Kim Seul-gi. The latter was released on May 23, 2013.

"Bad Girls" went straight to number one on both the Gaon Singles and Download Charts in the first week of June 2013, as the album's pre-release single did. It also topped the Billboard Korea K-Pop Hot 100 for the week of June 8, 2013, becoming her first song to reach the chart's pole position, a week after debuting at number 25. This song won the first place on televised K-pop music shows like SBS's The Music Trend, KBS's Music Bank, MBC Music's Show Champion, and Mnet's M! Countdown, from June 2 to 13. As of September 2025, "Bad Girls" has sold about 900,000 digital copies in South Korea. Lee performed "Bad Girls" as part of a highly praised collaboration stage at the 2013 SBS Gayo Daejeon televised concert, along with CL from girl group 2NE1, who had also released a bad girl themed song that year called "The Baddest Female".

== Promotion ==
Lee held a special comeback show titled 2Hyori Show at the Ilsan KINTEX on May 14, 2013, performing her brand-new songs including "Bad Girls", "Full Moon", "Wouldn't Ask You", and "Bounced Checks of Love". The show was recorded in private, and aired through the cable channel Mnet on May 22, 2013. The show was also broadcast on OnStyle, KMTV, tvN, O'live TV, and StoryOn the same day, simultaneously.

Lee began promoting her comeback album on various music programs, starting on the May 24, 2013, broadcast of KBS's Music Bank. Along with the lead single, she promoted "Miss Korea" on Music Bank and MBC Music's Show Champion, "Holly Jolly Bus" on MBC's Music Core and Mnet's M! Countdown, and "Full Moon" on SBS's Inkigayo for her comeback stages, respectively. She performed "Full Moon" also on MBC's Dancing with the Stars. On KBS's You Hee-yeol's Sketchbook, Lee performed the two lead singles and "Show Show Show", along with her previous hits "10 Minutes", "Chitty Chitty Bang Bang", and "U-Go-Girl". The singer wrapped up promotions for Monochrome, performing a rock-arranged version of the title track, with featured artists Ahn Young-mi and Kim Seul-gi, at 2013 Mnet 20's Choice Awards.

== Awards and nominations ==
Awards and nominations
Year	Award	Category	Nominee	Result
2013	Melon Music Awards	Music Video Award	"Miss Korea"	Nominated
2013	Mnet 20's Choice Awards	20's Online Music	"Bad Girls"	Nominated
2013	Mnet Asian Music Awards	Best Dance Performance – Female Solo	"Bad Girls"	Nominated

Music program awards for "Bad Girls"
Program	Date	Ref.
Inkigayo	June 2, 2013	
Music Bank	June 7, 2013	
Show Champion	June 12, 2013	
M Countdown	June 13, 2013	

== Track listing ==
CD/Digital download
No.	Title	Lyrics	Music	Length
1.	"Holly Jolly Bus" (featuring Soonshim the Dog)	Lee Hyori	Mads Hauge, Phil Thornalley	3:05
2.	"Miss Korea" (미스코리아; Miseukoria)	Lee Hyori	Lee Hyori	3:55
3.	"Love Radar" (featuring Beenzino of Jazzyfact)	Brian Kim	Christian Vinten, Gabriella Jangfeldt, Peter Wennerberg	4:07
4.	"Bad Girls"	Lee Hyori	Nermin Harambasic, Robin Jenssen, Ronny Vidar Svendsen, Anne Judith Wik, Chris Young	3:27
5.	"I Hate Myself" (내가 미워요; Naega Miwoyo)	Lee Hyori, Min Dong-sook	Hauge, Thornalley	3:28
6.	"Bounced Checks of Love" (사랑의 부도수표; Sarangui Budosupyo)	Kim Tae-chun	Kim Tae-chun	2:29
7.	"Full Moon"	Lee Seung-yun	Lee Seung-yun	3:11
8.	"Trust Me"	Min Dong-sook	Nermin Harambasic, Robin Jenssen, Ronny Vidar Svendsen, Anne Judith Wik	3:19
9.	"Special"	Kim Mi-jin	Nermin Harambasic, Robin Jenssen, Ronny Vidar Svendsen, Anne Judith Wik, Kyosti Anton Salokorpi	3:40
10.	"Amor Mio" (duet with Park Ji-yong of Honey G)	Lee Hyori	Nermin Harambasic, Robin Jenssen, Ronny Vidar Svendsen, Anne Judith Wik, Salokorpi, Eirik Johansen, Thomas Henriksen, Hayley Aitken	4:00
11.	"Somebody" (누군가; Nugunga)	Jo Dong-hee	Jaakko Salovaara, Matti Mikkola, Joanna Wang	3:34
12.	"Wouldn't Ask You" (묻지 않을게요; Mudji Anheulgeyo)	Kim Tae-chun	Kim Tae-chun	2:25
13.	"Going Crazy" (미쳐; Michyeo, featuring Ahn Young-mi)	Lee Hyori	Nermin Harambasic, Robin Jenssen, Ronny Vidar Svendsen, Anne Judith Wik, Salokorpi	3:35
14.	"Show Show Show" (쇼쇼쇼; Shyoshyoshyo)	Lee Hyori	Raph Schillebeeckx, Sanne Putseys	3:38
15.	"Better Together"	Lee Hyori	Mats Valentin-Berntoft, Hayley Penne	3:50
16.	"Oars" (노; No)	Lee Kyu-ho	Nermin Harambasic, Robin Jenssen, Ronny Vidar Svendsen, Anne Judith Wik, Salokorpi	3:45
Total length:				55:28

Notes

- "Wouldn't Ask You" was originally composed by blues musician Kim Tae-chun, although never officially released. The song was later given as a gift to Lee Hyori, with some foul words at the end of the lyrics, "I wouldn't ask you why you left me / I wouldn't curse at you and call you a b**** / I wouldn't curse at you and call you a c*** / I wouldn't ask you why you left me", excluded.
- The lyrics of "Oars" includes "Ieodosana" (Korean: 이어도사나), an old sea shanty which the haenyeos in Jeju Island sing when they go out to work.

== Credits and personnel ==
Credits for Monochrome adapted from album liner notes.

- Lee Hyori – vocals, songwriter, music producer
- Soonshim the Dog – featured artist
- Mads Louis Hauge – songwriter
- Phil Thornalley – songwriter
- Jang Seok-beom – harmonica
- Kim Bo-a – background vocals
- Lee Sang-soon – arrangement, guitar
- Min Jae-hyeon – bass
- Bak Yong-jun – keyboard
- Shin Seok-cheol – drums
- Beenzino – featured artist
- Brian Kim – songwriter
- Christian Vinten – songwriter
- Gabriella Jangfeldt – songwriter
- Peter Lars Kristian Wennerberg – songwriter
- Jeong Jin-wook – keyboard
- Nermin Harambasic – songwriter
- Robin Jenssen – songwriter
- Ronny Vidar Svendsen – songwriter
- Anne Judith Wik – songwriter
- Chris Young – songwriter
- Min Dong-sook – songwriter
- Kim Tae-chun – songwriter, arrangement, guitar
- Oh Jae-young – bass
- Lee Won-seok – drums
- Kim Min-gyu – recording engineer
- Lee Seung-yun – songwriter, arrangement
- Lee Sang-tae – bass
- Jo Yong-chan – drums, tambourine
- Lee Seong-hwan – recording engineer
- Ahn Tae-bong – recording engineer
- Kim Mi-jin – songwriter
- Kyosti Anton Salokorpi – songwriter
- Bak Ji-yong – featured artist, piano
- Eirik Johansen – songwriter
- Thomas Henriksen – songwriter
- Hayley Aitken – songwriter
- Jo Dong-hee – songwriter
- Jaakko Salovaara – songwriter
- Matti Mikkola – songwriter
- Joanna Wang – songwriter
- Ahn Young-mi – featured artist
- Raph Schillebeeckx – songwriter
- Sanne Putseys – songwriter
- Mats Valentin-Berntoft – songwriter
- Hayley Penne – songwriter
- Lee Kyu-ho – songwriter
- Kim Ji-woong – co-producer
- Bae Young-jun – music editing, arrangement
- Heo Eun-sook – music editing, recording engineer
- Choi Ja-yeon – music editing
- Lee Geun-seop – director of production and management
- Jeon Hyeong-jin – director of production and management
- Joo Cha-woong – artist management, promotion
- Jeong Cheon-young – artist management, promotion
- Son Seung-woo – artist management, promotion
- Bak Mi-ran – public relation, publicity
- Kim So-young – planning, development
- Shin Ji-seon – planning, development
- Kim Gyu-sang – choreography director
- Kim Yong-deok – choreography director
- Kim Jin-cheol – choreography director
- Go Min-ae – vocal director, background vocals
- Jo Jun-seong – mixing engineer
- Jeon Hoon – mastering engineer
- Da-young Jenna Lee – mastering coordinator
- Choi Da-hae – publishing, copyright clearance
- Bak So-young – publishing, copyright clearance
- Jeong Hyo-won – publishing, copyright clearance
- Hwang Eun-kyeong – publishing, copyright clearance
- Kim Rae-hyeong – publishing, copyright clearance
- Cha Eun-taek – music video director
- Jeong Bo-yoon – style director
- Jeong Seol – stylist
- Lee Ji-hye – stylist
- Bak Bo-ra – assistant stylist
- Choi Won-kyeong – assistant stylist
- Han Ji-seon – hair stylist
- Jo Mi-yeon – assistant hair stylist
- Hong Seong-hee – makeup
- Hong Jang-hyeon – design director, photographer
- Ryu Kyeong-yoon – assistant photographer
- Choi Jun-ho – assistant photographer
- Kim Min-seon – prop stylist
- Jang Won-seok – digital retoucher
- Ock Min-a – digital retoucher
- Go Joo-yeon – artwork, design
- Jeong Gyu-cheol – printing
- Kang Min-ho – printing
- Gil Jong-hwa – executive producer
- B2M Entertainment – executive producer

== Charts ==
=== Weekly charts ===
Chart (2013)	Peak position
South Korean Albums (Gaon)	4

=== Monthly charts ===
Chart (2013)	Peak position
South Korean Albums (Gaon)	9

=== Year-end charts ===
Chart (2013)	Position
South Korean Albums (Gaon)	84

== Sales ==
Region	Certification	Certified units/sales
South Korea	—	17,000

== Release history ==
Region	Date	Format	Edition	Label
South Korea	May 21, 2013	CD, digital download	Normal edition	B2M Entertainment, CJ E&M Music
South Korea	May 24, 2013	CD	Special limited edition	B2M Entertainment, CJ E&M Music
Worldwide	May 21, 2013	Digital download	Standard edition	B2M Entertainment, CJ E&M Music

== See also ==
- List of Korea K-Pop Hot 100 number-one singles
- List of number-one hits of 2013 (South Korea)
