= She (EP) =

- She album cover

EP by Heo Young-saeng
- Released: October 16, 2013
- Genre: K-pop
- Language: Korean
- Producer: B2M Entertainment; CJ E&M

Heo Young-saeng chronology
Life (2013)	She (2013)

Music video
- "Weak Child" on YouTube

She is Heo Young-saeng's fourth Korean EP. It is released on October 16, 2013 under B2M Entertainment. She marks the last album release of Heo before his enlistment on October 31, 2013.

The album contains five songs including an introduction track and an instrumental version of its title track, "Weak Child".

== Background and development ==
On July 3, 2013, Heo Young-saeng released his last Japanese album, Memories to You, as a parting gift for his Japanese fans before his enlistment date. Later on, B2M announced on September 18 that Heo might have his first concert in Korea on October 26. Seven days later, it was announced that Heo will release his new album next month, October, and will join the army the following month after his said concert. Further details were released after nine days saying that Heo's concert is confirmed and hinting his enlistment date as well, saying that the exact enlist date and recruit training center have not been confirmed yet.

On October 3, B2M officially announced Heo's enlistment details through his official website. They confirmed that he will be enlisted on October 31 at 2pm at Nonsan Korean Army Training Center. He is to be enlisted as a conscripted policeman after passing in late July. It is also said that he has been preparing for the military after receiving the draft notice. He is the second member of SS501 to be enlisted.

Finally on October 7, B2M once again announced Heo's last album release on October 16 before his enlistment. Heo Young saeng also gives a teaser about his upcoming music video through Twitter with the tweet: "Coming soon..." and a photo of himself on a forest or park. Hours later, B2M released more photos through his official website.

== Release and promotion ==
On October 7, online CD websites released a pre-order version of She special album. The album contains five tracks about a man's regrets and painful memories for a past lover. A week after, B2M released a 36-second teaser for his title track, "몸이 약한 아이" (Weak Child) featuring Japanese actress Fujii Mina through YouTube. The teaser evokes strong emotions as Heo Young-saeng delivers a soulful song while showing scenes of his past love. Finally at exactly 12 midnight of October 16, B2M released the full music video of it through its official YouTube account. In less than thirty minutes after its release, however, the video has had technical problems as stated by B2M, thus it was removed from the website. It was re-uploaded by B2M after less than two hours later, nevertheless.

There was a fansigning event held on October 20, 7pm at KT Ole Square. On October 26, Heo had his first concert in Seoul entitled "2013 Heo Young Saeng Seoul Concert 0513 My Story". This concert marks the first time that all five members of SS501 appeared together on one stage after their solo careers. It also marks their first time to perform together as a group again after three years, as seen at the UNIQLO AX Hall. Lastly, the concert is also his last performance before he goes to the army on October 31.

=== Music Shows ===
Heo Young Saeng performed only once in KBS' Music Bank on October 25, singing his single, "Weak Child".

== Track listing ==
No.	Title	Lyrics	Music	Arrangement	Length
1.	"Fall Recipe" (가을 길목)				0:36
2.	"Whew.." (휴..)	Sweetune			3:27
3.	"Weak Child" (몸이 약한 아이)	Sweetune	Han Jae-ho, Kim Seung-soo, YUE	YUE, Hong Seung-hyun	3:34
4.	"Not the End of the Story" (못 다한 이야기)	Sweetune			3:14
5.	"Weak Child inst." (몸이 약한 아이 Inst.)		Han Jae-ho, Kim Seung-soo, YUE		3:34

== Music videos ==
- "Weak Child"

== Release history ==
Country	Date	Distributing label	Format
South Korea	October 16, 2013	B2M Entertainment; CJ E&M	CD
Worldwide	October 16, 2013	B2M Entertainment	Digital download

== Charts ==
Weekly Charts

Chart	Country	Period	Peak position	Notes
Gaon Digital Charts	South Korea	13–19 October 2013	134	"She" download - 1,045,656
Gaon Streaming Charts	South Korea	13–19 October 2013	190	"She" download - 191,840
Gaon Download Charts	South Korea	13–19 October 2013	123	"She" download - 18,063
Gaon BGM Charts	South Korea	13–19 October 2013	80	
Gaon Album Charts	South Korea	13–19 October 2013	5	

Monthly Charts

Chart	Country	Period	Peak position	Notes
Gaon Album Charts	South Korea	October 2013	17	
