= Yang Ji-won (singer) =

South Korean singer and actress (born 1988)

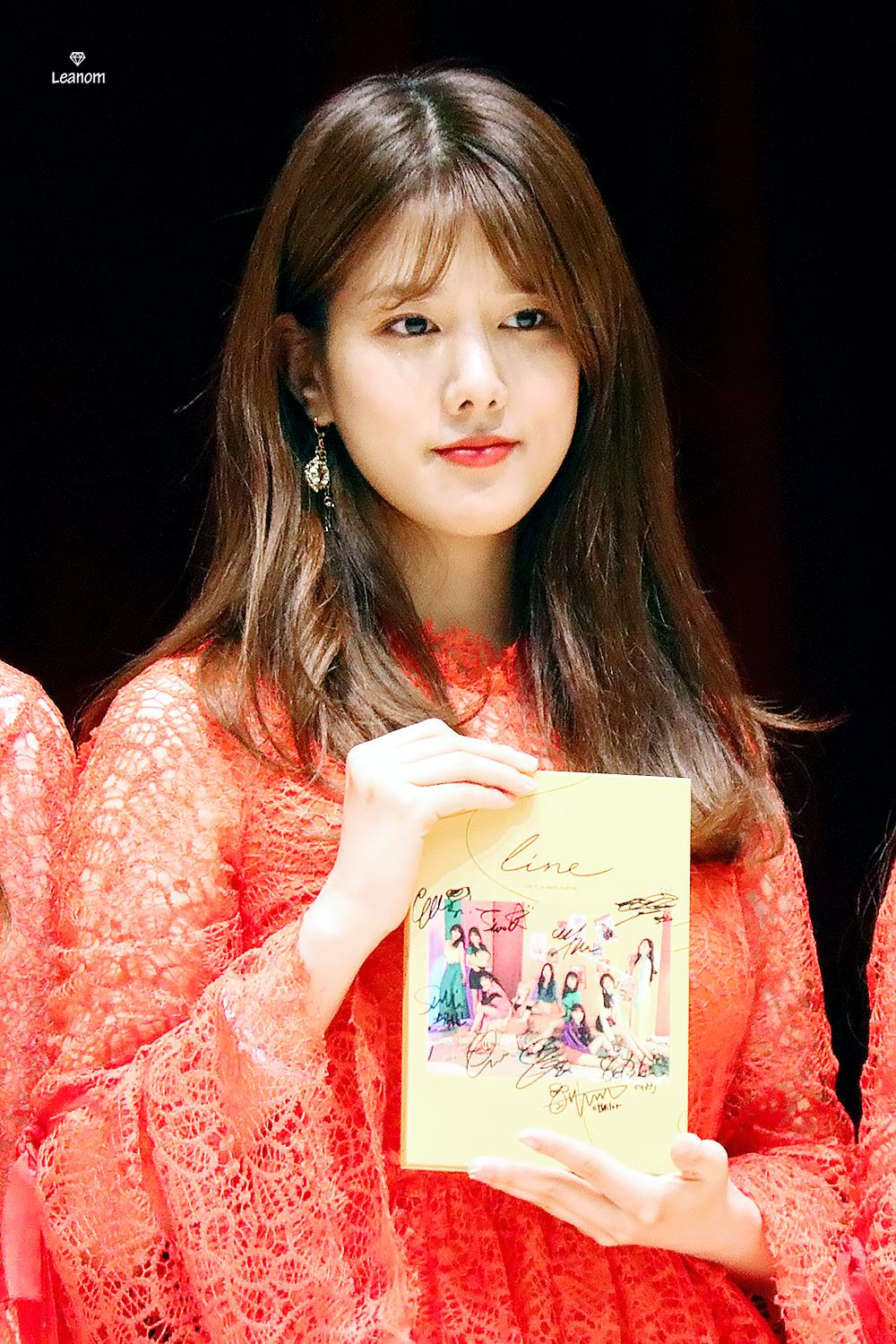
- Yang in 2018
- Born: April 5, 1988 (age 38); Seoul, South Korea
- Education: Dongguk University, Department of Theatre and Film
- Occupations: Singer; actress
- Years active: 2008–present
- Spouse: Yang Joon-mo (m. 2026)
- Musical career
- Genre: K-pop
- Instrument: Vocals
- Years active: 2007–present
- Labels: Mnet Media; CJ E&M; B2M; ASA Music LLC; PocketDol Studio; CL& Company
- Formerly of: T-ara; Spica; Uni.T

Korean name
- Hangul: 양지원
- RR: Yang Jiwon
- MR: Yang Chiwŏn

Yang Ji-won (Korean: 양지원; born April 5, 1988) is a South Korean singer and actress. She is a former member of T-ara, Spica and Uni.T, and made her solo debut in 2020 with the single "Towards the Sun".

Initially slated to debut as a member of Five Girls and then T-ara, Yang made her debut as a member of Spica in 2012. After the group disbanded in 2017, she debuted as a member of UNI.T a year later after participating in The Unit: Idol Rebooting Project and ranking sixth in the final episode.

== Early life and education ==
Yang was born on April 5, 1988, in Seoul, South Korea. However, she grew up in Jeonju. She graduated from Poongmoon Girls' High School and subsequently from the Department of Theatre and Film at Dongguk University.

== Career ==
=== 2007–2011: Pre-debut, Five Girls, T-ara ===
Yang was originally set to debut as part of the five-member group Five Girls under Good Entertainment alongside Yubin, Uee, Jun Hyo-seong, and G.NA. In 2007, they starred in an MTV reality show Diary of Five Girls. However, due to the company's financial issues, the group never debuted.

She then trained under Mnet media and was part of the original T-ara lineup with Jiae, Eunjung, Hyomin, and Jiyeon, the latter three eventually debuting with the group. Yang left alongside Jiae in June 2009, with Mnet Media citing differences in music style. She continued working as an actress and idol.

=== 2012–2018: Spica, The Unit: Idol Rebooting Project, UNI.T ===
On January 10, 2012, Spica released their first digital single "Doggedly". In February, Yang formally debuted as a member of Spica with the release of the EP Russian Roulette.

In September 2014, Yang debuted as part of Spica subunit Spica.S (Spica Special).

On August 11, 2015, she took part in the kids' musical program The Fairies in My Arms with MBLAQ's Mir and GFriend's SinB.

On February 6, 2017, CJ E&M announced the group's disbandment. After the group disbanded, she earned a living by selling green juice.

In July 2017, KBS announced their new survival show that would create two nine-member groups, one male and one female, among idols who had already debuted. Starting October 28, Yang appeared in The Unit: Idol Rebooting Project. She maintained a top 9 rank throughout the show and ranked sixth in the final episode, thus making it into UNI.T.

On April 28, 2018, it was announced that UNI.T would be making their debut on May 17. However, their debut was pushed back to May 18. Yang debuted as a member of UNI.T with the EP Line and the title track "No More". On October 12, the group had their last Music Bank performance after which they held their last fanmeeting; they subsequently disbanded.

=== 2020–present: Solo debut ===
On May 8, 2020, Yang made her solo debut under CL& Company, with her first single "Towards the Sun". She appeared in the television series Unpredictable Family as Jeong Hye-yoon, the biological mother of Shin Ga-ram. Her contract with CL& Company ended in March 2024.

== Personal life ==
On the July 31, 2018 episode of Video Star, Yang revealed that she had a non-celebrity boyfriend.

On August 24, 2026, Yang announced on her personal Instagram account that she will marry actor Yang Joon-mo and that she is expecting their first child.

== Discography ==
=== Soundtrack appearances ===
Title	Year	Peak chart positions	Album
Title	Year	KOR	Album
"Might Gonna" with Jo Jung-suk, Kim Ji-won	2012	—	What's Up OST
"If It Were Me"	2014	—	God's Gift: 14 Days OST
"—" denotes releases that did not chart or were not released in that region.

== Filmography ==
=== Film ===
Year	Title	Role	Notes
2008	Death Bell	Min Hye-young	

=== Television series ===
Year	Title	Role	Notes/Ref.
2011–2012	What's Up	Yang Ji-eun	Main
2015	Divorce Lawyer in Love	Yoo Hye-rin	
2015	Larva and Friends in My Arms	Yo Reu-jeong	
2017	Go Back	Cameo	
2022	Game of Witches	Jin Sun-mi	
2024	Unpredictable Family	Jeong Hye-yoon	

=== Television shows ===
Year	Title	Role	Notes
2007	Diary of Five Girls	Herself	
2017–2018	The Unit: Idol Rebooting Project	Contestant	Finished sixth
2018	King of Mask Singer	Contestant; "Gatsby's First Love, the Great Daisy"	Ep. 147
2020	Sea of Orders (Korean: 주문 바다요)		

=== Web dramas ===
Year	Title	Role	Notes
2018	We Break Up Every Time But We Love Again		

=== Music video appearances ===
Year	Song title	Artist	Ref.
2011	"Yesterday"	Kim Kyu-jong	
2011	"I'll Be There"	Boyfriend	
2011	"Bad Guy"	No Gi-tae (feat. H-Eugene)	
2013	"Shower of Tears"	Baechigi (feat. Ailee)	
