= Life (EP) =

- Life cover

EP by Heo Young-saeng
- Released: March 14, 2013
- Genre: K-pop, dance
- Language: Korean
- Label: CJ E&M
- Producer: B2M Entertainment

Heo Young-saeng chronology
Solo (2012)	Life (2013)	She (2013)

Music video
- "The Art of Seduction" on YouTube

Life is the third Korean extended play (EP) of South Korean singer Heo Young-saeng. It was released on March 14, 2013 under B2M Entertainment and distributed by CJ E&M.

The album contains four songs and an instrumental version of the lead song "The Art of Seduction" (aka "How To Get Girls").

== Background and development ==
On February 18, 2013, almost a year since South Korean singer Heo Young-saeng's last mini-album Solo, B2M Entertainment posted the words: "next B2M artist .... HEO YOUNG SAENG Coming soon!" onto their Twitter account, announcing Heo's upcoming album. After their initial announcement, the agency started giving updates and schedules for the album Life. B2M Entertainment also reported that besides an upbeat song for his upcoming title track, Heo's next recording would be more colorful or brighter than his last.

An 18-second music video teaser was uploaded on YouTube on March 6: it shows an obsessive fangirl inside a dark room full of images of Heo. She frantically draws his portrait on a piece of paper while police sirens and thunder are heard in the background. The teaser was later revealed to be the opening scene prior to the main music video. It was followed by the release of the music video's second teaser two days later: using the instrumental version of "Life" as its background song, the 20-second video is composed of various close-ups of Heo and the fangirl's facial expressions first, and later reveals him to be imprisoned inside a cage. In addition, a preview of the album jacket and five different concept photos were posted days before the release of the EP.

== Release and promotion ==
Heo Young-saeng officially released his third mini album Life on March 14. The three-minute and forty-three-second music video of its title track entitled "The Art of Seduction" was also uploaded on YouTube on the same day. The funky, retro dance lead song was produced by Sweet Tune's Han Jaeho and Kim Seung-soo, while the accompanying music video features Choi Ji-yeon as the obsessive blonde-haired girl, as well as a cameo of Seo Ji-seok as the policeman at the end of the video.

It was no coincidence that the music video was released during White Day as Heo said: "The event itself is the comeback." On White Day, men are supposed to give something back to women who gave them gifts on Valentine's Day, In the same way, the idea behind "The Art of Seduction" is that Heo approaches women and gives himself to them. While the lyrics talk about a man aggressively seducing ladies, the music video is the complete opposite in that Heo is shown held captive by a delusional fan.

As part of the promotions, Heo appeared in various TV shows and segments including MBC Radio's Shim Shim Ta Pa (or Stop the Boring Time) with DJ Shindong, Episode 33 of Mnet America's Jjang, and We Got Married Global Edition as a guest star of Lee Hongki. He also performed on May 3, 2013 during the MBC Korea China Friendship Concert.

=== Music shows ===
Heo Young-saeng held his comeback performance on Mnet's M Countdown on March 14, performing "The Art of Seduction" live. He continued his promotions on M Countdown for the next few weeks, as well as performing in other South Korean weekly music programs including MBC's Show! Music Core, SBS's Inkigayo, and KBS's Music Bank.

== Artwork ==
Vivid and playful colors surrounding Heo Young-saeng

A day or two before the mini album's scheduled release, Heo Young-saeng posted photo teasers of himself through B2M Entertainment's Twitter account. On March 12 and 13, five different photo releases (for example, the image on the right) showed Heo's "big transformation through his new look: Orange colored hair, colorful style and a smile with confidence." His playful appearance was evident in each picture: bright shades such as blue, white, orange, red, and yellow were used as background colors; the clothes he wore were vividly colored; and additional props such as a big chocolate bar, chips, and a fat cat were included.

According to B2M Entertainment, these concept photos were produced to visualize the idea of a new, transformed Heo. This was particularly shown through his musical style and image. The five images also represented different styles or music genres of the songs included in his mini-album. In addition, Heo's wearing of retro-style clothing indicated the funky, retro-dance-music genre of his title track, "The Art of Seduction".

== Chart performance ==
The album peaked at number one on Gaon Album Chart during the first week of its release starting on March 10, 2013, and remained among the top 100 albums for two weeks. It eventually landed at number 8 on the Gaon Monthly Album Charts for March 2013.

The single "The Art of Seduction" was at number 41 on Gaon Single Chart for the first week of its release and landed at number 94 on the Gaon Monthly Single Charts.

== Post-release ==
Several months after his Korean mini-album release, Heo Young-saeng announced his plans to enlist in the army to fulfil his conscription requirements. Heo released his last Japanese album Memories to You and Korean mini-album She on July 3 and October 7, respectively, before enlisting. He also held his first concert in Seoul entitled 2013 Heo Young Saeng Seoul Concert 0513 My Story with the attendance of all the members of SS501 at the UNIQLO AX Hall. He enlisted on October 31, 2013 as a conscripted policeman after he passed the army test in late July.

== Track listing ==
No.	Title	Lyrics	Music	Arrangement	Length
1.	"Life"	Han Jaeho, Kim Seung-soo, Song Sooyun	Han Jaeho, Kim Seung-soo (Sweet Tune)	Han Jaeho, Kim Seung-soo, Hong Sung-hyun	3:20
2.	"The Art of Seduction" (작업의 정석)	Han Jaeho, Kim Seung-soo	Han Jaeho, Kim Seung-soo	Han Jaeho, Kim Seung-soo, Hong Sung-hyun	3:07
3.	"That's Me" (그게 나야)	Chung Hanjong	Lee Jong Hyung		3:31
4.	"Know It All" (알아 다)	Song Soo Yun	Lee Juhan, G-High		3:39
5.	"The Art of Seduction" (Instrumental)		Han Jaeho, Kim Seung-soo	Han Jaeho, Kim Seung-soo, Hong Sung-hyun	3:07
Total length:					16:46

== Music videos ==
- "The Art of Seduction"

== Release history ==
Country	Date	Distributing label	Format
South Korea	March 14, 2013	B2M Entertainment; CJ E&M	CD
Worldwide	March 14, 2013	B2M Entertainment	Digital download

== Charts ==
=== Album charts ===
Chart	Country	Peak position	Notes/Ref
Gaon Weekly Album Chart	South Korea	1	
Gaon Monthly Album Chart	South Korea	8	11,892 copies
Five Music J-Pop/K-Pop Chart	Taiwan	9	1.55% sales

=== Single charts ===
Chart (Gaon)	Country	Peak	Notes/Ref
Weekly Single Chart	South Korea	41	"The Art of Seduction"
Weekly Monthly Chart	South Korea	94	"The Art of Seduction"
Weekly Download Chart	South Korea	50	"The Art of Seduction" - 33,650
Weekly Streaming Chart	South Korea	56	"The Art of Seduction" - 346,273
