= Lonely (Spica EP) =

EP by Spica
- Released: November 21, 2012
- Recorded: 2012
- Genre: K-pop; dance-pop; R&B
- Length: 18:25
- Language: Korean
- Label: B2M Entertainment
- Producer: Sweetune

Spica chronology
Russian Roulette (2012)	Lonely (2012)

Singles from Lonely
- 1. "Lonely" Released: November 21, 2012

Lonely is the second extended play by South Korean girl group Spica. It was released on November 21, 2012 by B2M Entertainment. The song of the same name was used as the title track for the album.

== Track listing ==
Track list
No.	Title	Lyrics	Music	Length
1.	"Lonely"	Song Su-yoon	Sweetune	3:26
2.	"With You"	Kim Boa	Kim Boa	3:41
3.	"That Night" (그날 밤)	Kim Bohyung	Kim Bohyung	3:40
4.	"Since You're Out of My Life"	Ryan S. Jhun, Kim Jin-hee, Ring	Annet Artani, Dane Deviller, Sean Hosein, Ryan S. Jhun	4:13
5.	"Lonely (Instrumental)"		Sweetune	3:25
Total length:				18:25

== Charts ==
Country	Chart	Peak position
South Korea (Gaon Music Chart)	Weekly albums chart	8
South Korea (Gaon Music Chart)	Monthly albums chart	36

== Sales ==
Chart	Amount
Gaon physical sales	2,113
