= Black (Lee Hyori album) =

Studio album by Lee Hyori
- Released: July 4, 2017
- Recorded: 2016–17
- Genre: K-pop
- Language: Korean
- Labels: Kiwi Media Group; LOEN
- Producer: Lee Hyori

Lee Hyori chronology
Monochrome (2013)	Black (2017)

Singles from Black
- 1. "Seoul" Released: June 28, 2017; 2. "Black" Released: July 4, 2017; 3. "White Snake" Released: July 5, 2017

Black is the sixth studio album by South Korean singer-songwriter Lee Hyori. It was released on July 4, 2017, by Kiwi Media Group and distributed by LOEN Entertainment. It is her first full-length after a four-year hiatus since Monochrome (2013). It comes after the expiration of her contract with B2M Entertainment and signing with Kim Hyung Suk's Kiwi Media Group. As of March 2026, this is her recent studio album.

This album continues the progress started with Monochrome with Lee veering from her early pop sound for more mature, experimental sound. Lee contributed self-composed songs while fully producing the album for the first time. Hyori worked alongside "10 Minutes" producer Kim Do Hyun while writing eight and composing nine of the ten album tracks. In this album, Lee decided to focus more on storytelling and revealing a more personal side without compromising her sexy image. It contains a total of ten tracks, including the pre-release "Seoul" and lead single title track.

== Background ==
In May 2015, Lee announced that she closed her blog as well as her Twitter account. Along with shutting down her social media, she stopped all of her television activities. In October of that year, Lee's representative told media outlets that she would be taking a 2-year hiatus from her entertainment career "in order to have time for herself."

Rumblings of Lee's return began in August 2016 but was confirmed when she did a photoshoot and spoke to Marie Claire Korea in October 2016. Lee signed a contract with Kiwi Media Group and began planning her comeback. Her plans interfered with her attendance of the 2016 Mnet Asian Music Awards as she concentrated on the album's production. After deleting all her social media, Hyori returned with a new Instagram account.

After signing exclusively with Kiwi Media, it was revealed that CEO Kim Hyung Suk and "10 Minutes" songwriter Kim Dong Hyun were working on the album with Hyori. In January 2017, Kim revealed on MBC's Video Star that Lee was taking on the bulk of the responsibility for her new album as executive producer. Her agency announced that singer-songwriter Lee Juck would be featured on one of the tracks.

== Release ==
On June 25, the album's tracklist reveal was then shortly followed. The day of the album's release Hyori gave a press conference and album showcase speaking her life, her image and new album before a selected group of journalists. Black was released physically and digitally on July 4, 2017.

=== Teasers ===
On June 25, Kiwi Media released a teaser image via Twitter for the album's pre-release track with a release date of June 28, 2017.

On June 30, Hyori released a teaser called Black Art Film No. 1 with release date and time of 6 pm on July 4, 2017. Later the same day, more teaser images for the album featuring a rustic theme were released. A second film teaser was released on July 1. On July 2, a third film teaser was released.

== Singles ==
=== "Seoul" ===
A day after Kiwi Media released a teaser image for the song, Lee released a video teaser for the song. The official music video was released alongside the digital single on June 28. On June 30, a "making of" video was released by K-Tune Collective. The self-composed song speaks of the love-hate relationship with South Korea's capital personifying a loved one. with lyrics "I turned and look far away, yeah/ But when I close my eyes, I remember/ I look back when longing washes over me, yeah/ But it's too late to go back."

Upon its release, "Seoul" debuted at number twenty-one on the Gaon Singles Chart and number twelve on Download Charts. As of November 2026, "Seoul" has sold 100,000 digital copies in South Korea.

=== "Black" ===
On July 2, Hyori released a video teaser in line with the album's rustic theme for the title track. Another video teaser was released on July 3. The music video premiered the same day of the album's release. The song is a reflective composition about Lee going back to her pre-debut self and feeling more comfortable in her skin.

Upon its release, "Black" debuted at number twenty-six on the Gaon Singles Chart and number twelve on the Download Charts.

=== "White Snake" ===
On July 5, Hyori performed and promoted "White Snake" as the third single of the album.

== Promotion ==
JTBC confirmed on April 19 that Lee along with husband Lee Sang-soon would star in their own variety program entitled Hyori's Homestay. The show follows the couple along with staff member singer IU run a bed and breakfast out of their marital home while interacting with other celebrities and ordinary citizens. This will make Lee's return to the variety arena since Lee Hyori's X Sister. The series began airing June 25.

Along with her own variety show, Hyori made the rounds of other variety shows. She appeared on the June 17 and 24 episodes of MBC's Infinite Challenge having filmed with the cast and crew on June 8. In the episodes, Lee spoke about her life outside the spotlight and demonstrated her dance and yoga skills. On June 22, Radio Star's official Twitter account announced that Lee along with Chae Ri-na, Kahi, and Brown Eyed Girls' Narsha would film an episode on June 28, which on July 5 with "tough girls". Lee appeared on the June 29 and July 6 episodes of Happy Together 3. SBS announced that Lee would be the first guest on Park Jin-young's new talk show Party People.

Hyori did an exclusive interview with JTBC's Newsroom anchor Sohn Seok-hee on June 29 talking about her new show, new album and life outside the spotlight.

On July 5, Lee performed on her first music show in four years through MBC's Show Champion. She performed the title track on all the music shows along with "Seoul" on Show! Music Core and Inkigayo and "White Snake" on Show Champion and Music Bank.

During her album showcase, she announced plans to promote for only a week through music shows and participate in Yoo Hee Yeol's Sketchbook.

== Track listing ==
No.	Title	Lyrics	Music	Arrangement	Length
1.	"Seoul" (featuring Killagramz)	Lee Hyori, Killagramz	Lee Hyori, Kim Do-hyun	Kim Do-hyun	4:07
2.	"Black"	Lee Hyori	Lee Hyori, Kim Do-hyun	Kim Do-hyun	4:16
3.	"White Snake" (featuring Los)	Lee Hyori, Los	Lee Hyori, Kim Do-hyun	Kim Do-hyun	3:37
4.	"Unknown Track" (featuring Absint)	Lee Hyori, Absint	Kim Do-hyun, Kim Ju-hyun	Kim Do-hyun	3:23
5.	"Love Me" (featuring Killagramz)	Lee Hyori, Killagramz	Lee Hyori, Kim Do-hyun	Kim Do-hyun	4:23
6.	"Rain Fall" (비야내려)	Lee Hyori	Kim Do-hyun	Yoon Woo-seok	3:04
7.	"Mute"	Kim Eana	Lee Hyori, Kim Do-hyun	Kim Do-hyun	3:22
8.	"Pretty"	Lee Hyori	Lee Hyori	Lee Hyori	4:34
9.	"What Doesn't Change" (변하지않는건) (featuring Los)	Lee Hyori, Los	Lee Hyori, Kim Do-hyun	Kim Do-hyun	3:23
10.	"Diamond" (다이아몬드) (duet with Lee Juck)	Lee Hyori	Lee Hyori	Lee Hyori	4:27
11.	"Seoul (Inst.)"		Lee Hyori, Kim Do-hyun	Kim Do-hyun	4:05
12.	"Black (Inst.)"		Lee Hyori, Kim Do-hyun	Kim Do-hyun	4:16
Total length:					47:04

== Credit and personnel ==
Credits for Black adapted from album liner notes.

- Lee Hyori – vocals, songwriter, arrangement, music producer, composer
- Kim Do-hyun – songwriter, arrangement, music producer, composer
- Kim Eana – songwriter
- Kim Ju-hyun – composer
- Yoo Woo-seok – arrangement
- Killagramz – featured artist, songwriter
- Los – featured artist, songwriter
- Absint – featured artist, songwriter
- Lee Juck – featured artist
- Kim Hyun-ah- background vocals
- Go Shin-jae – bass
- Kim Hyun-seok – executive producer
- Jung Dong-yoon – percussion
- Kim Hyung-suk – executive producer, piano
- Go Tae-young – guitar
- Yoo Yong-min – conductor, arrangement
- Yoong Strings – strings
- Han Won-jung – vocal producer
- Chris Gehringer – mastering engineer
- Kim Han-goo – mixing engineer
- Park Hyuk – mixing engineer
- Jo Jung-hyun – record engineer
- Jung Ho-jin – record engineer
- Kim Gab-su – record engineer
- Lee Kyung-soo – record engineer
- Park Sun-young – record engineer

== Charts ==
Chart (2017)	Peak position
South Korean Albums (Gaon)	9

== Release history ==
Region	Date	Format	Label
South Korea	July 4, 2017	CD, digital download	Kiwi Media Group, LOEN Entertainment
Various	July 4, 2017	Digital download	Kiwi Media Group, LOEN Entertainment
