= Kim Bo-hyung =

South Korean singer and musical actress (born 1989)

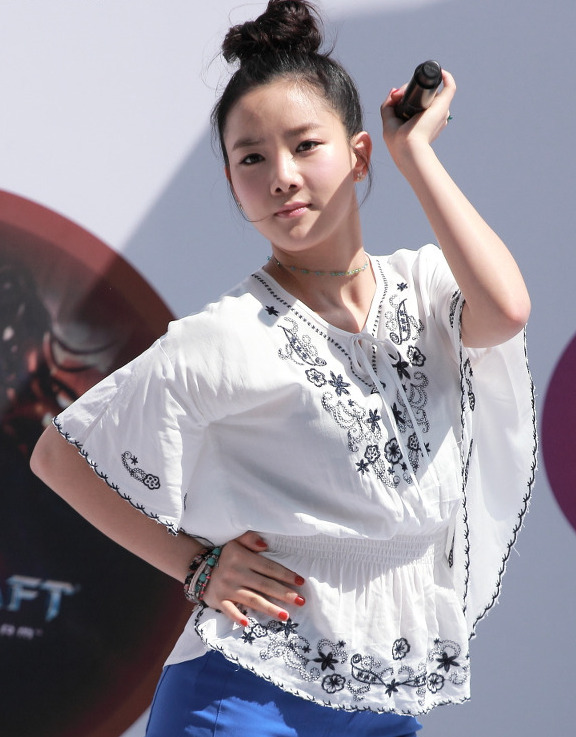
- Kim performing in 2013
- Born: March 31, 1989 (age 37)
- Other name: Ru.B (루비)
- Occupations: Singer; musical actress
- Spouse: Unknown (m. 2024)
- Musical career
- Years active: 2012–present
- Labels: B2M; CJ E&M; Ara-Line; T Cask
- Member of: Keembo; Uptown
- Formerly of: Spica

Korean name
- Hangul: 김보형
- RR: Gim Bohyeong
- MR: Kim Pohyŏng

Kim Bo-hyung (Korean: 김보형; born March 31, 1989) is a South Korean singer and musical actress. She debuted as a member of Spica in 2012 and made her solo debut with "Crazy Girl" in 2013. In 2016, Kim appeared on King of Mask Singer, where she was a finalist for the 26th Generation Mask King, and JTBC's contest program Girl Spirit, which she won. She later formed the duo Keembo in 2020 with fellow Spica member Kim Bo-a following Spica's disbandment in 2017. Kim made her Broadway debut in the 2022 musical KPOP.

== Career ==
=== 2008–2017: Debut in Spica, solo debut ===
Starting in 2008, Kim was a trainee at YG Entertainment for two years. She trained with the 2NE1 members and was considered for the group, but ultimately did not debut with them. In 2012, she made her debut as a member of Spica under B2M Entertainment, the agency of Lee Hyori, with the single "Doggedly" released on January 10. Kim made her solo debut in October 2013 with "Crazy Girl"; Lee participated in its composition and production. Kim appeared on Mnet's 100 Seconds War in 2014, becoming the second winner of the program following Kim Kyung-ho. She made her debut in the Spica subunit Spica.S (Spica Special) with "Give Your Love" in September. In 2015, Kim featured on "Can't Sleep" by rapper Flowsik.

In 2016, Kim released the main theme song "Our Story" for the series Piped Piper, as well as "Miss You" for the soundtrack of The Royal Gambler. She also appeared on King of Mask Singer as Space Agent Number Seven and competed to become the 26th Generation Mask King; she reached the final. Later that year Kim appeared on JTBC's Girl Spirit, winning the contest program and receiving a new car. The program highlighted twelve female idol vocalists from lesser-known groups. While on the program, she collaborated with Flowsik. In November, she released "Today" for the soundtrack of the series The K2. Later that month she was confirmed to be a cast member of Cross Country, where the cast drives to California and communicates with foreign artists through music. The show began broadcasting in February 2017. She also participated in the soundtrack for the series with cast members Park Ye-eun, Suran, and Kang Han-na. CJ E&M announced Spica's disbandment on February 6, 2017.

=== 2018–present: Debut in Keembo, Broadway debut ===
In 2018, Kim released two singles: "Flash Me" and "Because of You". On February 27, 2019, she released the single "Howl Howl" as the single album A Bird Flutters Away. "Howl Howl" depicts the journey of a baby bird learning how to fly. In June, she released the song "Stay" for the soundtrack of the series Abyss. "Beautiful" was released as a single in July. In December, she released "In My Shadow" for Black Dog: Being A Teacher.

In 2020, Kim and fellow former Spica member Kim Bo-a formed the duo Keembo, named for the two shared syllables of their names. They made their debut under Ara-Line on April 10 with the single "Thank You, Anyway". On June 1, she released "Like the Stars and the Moon" for Born Again.

In 2021, she featured on "Arkanoid" by Kim Jung Woo of the band Toxic. The song is named for the video game Arkanoid, and features 8-bit synth and drums.

Kim made her Broadway debut in the musical KPOP in 2022. Among several K-pop idols in the cast, Kim portrayed Tiny of the fictional K-pop girl group Rtmis. The musical made its Broadway debut at Circle in the Square Theatre, and closed two weeks into its run. Kim, with the stage name Ru.B, joined the hip-hop group Uptown under T Cask as a guest vocalist for their 25th anniversary best-of album Back II Analog in December 2023.

== Personal life ==
Kim was born on March 31, 1989. She has a bachelor's degree from Dongduk Women's University. In June 2024, she married a non-celebrity at the Hotel Shilla in Seoul. Her wedding was attended by the former Spica members as well as Park Jin-young, who sang a duet with her husband.

== Discography ==
=== Singles ===
==== As lead artist ====
Title	Year	Peak chart positions	Album
Title	Year	KOR	Album
"Crazy Girl" (내가 미친년이야)	2013	—	Non-album singles
"Flash Me"	2018	—	Non-album singles
"Because of You"	2018	—	Non-album singles
"Howl Howl" (훨훨)	2019	—	A Bird Flutters Away
"Beautiful" (아름다워)	2019	—	Non-album single
"—" denotes releases that did not chart or were not released in that region.

==== As featured artist ====
Title	Year	Peak chart positions	Album
Title	Year	KOR	Album
"Can't Sleep" (Flowsik feat. Kim Bo-hyung)	2015	—	Yah, Nuh
"Arkanoid" (Kim Jung Woo feat. Kim Bo-hyung)	2021	—	Non-album single
"—" denotes releases that did not chart or were not released in that region.

==== Soundtrack appearances ====
Title	Year	Peak chart positions	Album
Title	Year	KOR	Album
"Our Story"	2016	—	Piped Piper OST
"Miss You" (그리워)	2016	—	The Royal Gambler OST
"Today" (오늘도)	2016	—	The K2 OST
"Cross Country" (with Ha:tfelt and Suran)	2017	—	Cross Country OST
"Stay"	2019	—	Abyss OST
"In My Shadow" (그림자)	2019	—	Black Dog: Being A Teacher OST
"Like the Stars and the Moon" (별과 달처럼)	2020	—	Born Again OST
"—" denotes releases that did not chart or were not released in that region.

=== Songwriting credits ===
All credits are adapted from the Korea Music Copyright Association unless stated otherwise.

Year	Artist	Song	Album	Lyrics	Music
Year	Artist	Song	Album	Credited	Credited
2012	Spica	"Diary"	Russian Roulette	Yes	Yes
2012	Spica	"That Night"	Lonely	Yes	Yes
2017	Kim Bo-hyung	"Like a Child"	Cross Country OST Part.2	Yes	Yes
2017	Ha:tfelt, Suran, Kim Bo-hyung	"Cross Country"	Cross Country OST Part.4	Yes	Yes
2018	Kim Bo-hyung	"Flash Me"	—N/a	No	Yes
2018	Kim Bo-hyung	"Because of You"	—N/a	Yes	Yes
2019	Kim Bo-hyung	"Howl Howl"	A Bird Flutters Away	Yes	Yes
2019	Kim Bo-hyung	"Beautiful"	—N/a	Yes	Yes
2020	Keembo	"Thank You Anyway"	Scandalous	Yes	Yes
2020	Keembo	"Scandalous"	Scandalous	Yes	Yes
2020	Keembo	"99 (Gu Gu)"	99 (Gu Gu)	Yes	Yes
2020	Keembo	"Cloud 9"	99 (Gu Gu)	Yes	Yes
2020	Keembo	"Scene"	—N/a	Yes	No
2021	Keembo	"Love Me 4 Me"	—N/a	Yes	Yes
2021	Keembo	"Inside"	Scandal	Yes	Yes
2021	Keembo	"Voodoo"	Scandal	Yes	Yes
2021	Keembo	"Reflection"	Scandal	Yes	Yes
2021	Keembo	"Whatever"	—N/a	No	Yes

== Filmography ==
=== Television series ===
Year	Title	Role	Notes	Ref.
2014	100 Seconds War	Herself	Second winner	
2016	King of Mask Singer	Space Agent Number Seven	Finalist for 26th Generation Mask King	
2016	Girl Spirit	Herself	Winner	
2017	Cross Country	Herself		

=== Theater ===
Year	Title	Role	Notes	Ref.
2022	KPOP	Tiny	Off-Broadway	
