= Sharp (South Korean band) =

South Korean pop group

- Also known as: S#arp
- Origin: South Korea
- Genres: K-pop, pop, dance-pop
- Years active: 1998–2002
- Labels: World Music Entertainment; SM Entertainment; Warner Music Korea
- Past members: Lee Ji-hye; Seo Ji-young; Jang Seok-hyun; John Kim; Oh Hee-jong; Chris; Sori

Sharp (stylized as S#arp; Korean: 샵) was a South Korean co-ed pop vocal group that was active from 1998 to 2002.

The group initially consisted of Lee Ji-hye, Seo Ji-young, Jang Seok-hyun, John Kim and Oh Hee-jong. Chris was introduced as a guest member during this time. John and Hee-jong left the group after the release of the group's first album, The S#arp, in 1998. New member Sori and Chris officially joined the group in 1999 for the second album, The S#arp+2. Sori later left the group, and Sharp went on to release the albums, The Four Letter World Love (2000), 4ever Feel So Good (2001), Flat Album (2001), and Style (2002). The group disbanded in 2002, reportedly as a result of ongoing conflict between Ji-hye and Ji-young, including verbal and physical assault.

== Members ==
=== Final lineup ===
- Jang Seok-hyun – leader (1999–2002), rapper (1998–2002)
- Lee Ji-hye – vocalist (1998–2002)
- Seo Ji-young – rapper, vocalist (1998–2002)
- Chris – rapper (1999–2002)

=== Other past members ===
- John Kim – leader, rapper (1998–1999)
- Oh Hee-jong – rapper (1998–1999)
- Sori – rapper (1999–2000)

== Discography ==
=== Studio albums ===
Title	Album details	Peak chart positions	Sales
Title	Album details	KOR	Sales
The S#arp	Released: November 17, 1998; Label: World Music Entertainment; Formats: CD, cassette	15	KOR: 83,047
The S#arp+2	Released: October 4, 1999; Label: World Music Entertainment; Formats: CD, cassette	4	KOR: 195,908
The Four Letter Word Love	Released: August 12, 2000; Label: World Music Entertainment; Formats: CD, cassette	3	KOR: 170,894
4ever Feel So Good	Released: February 20, 2001; Label: World Music Entertainment; Formats: CD, cassette	5	KOR: 214,049
Flat Album	Released: November 5, 2001; Label: World Music Entertainment; Formats: CD, cassette	2	KOR: 194,671
Style	Released: September 6, 2002; Label: World Music Entertainment; Formats: CD, cassette	5	KOR: 137,785

=== Compilation albums ===
Title	Album details	Peak chart positions	Sales
Title	Album details	KOR	Sales
Smart & Smooth	Released: January 24, 2003; Label: World Music Entertainment; Formats: CD, cassette	19	KOR: 17,848

== Awards ==
=== Mnet Asian Music Awards ===
Year	Category	Work	Result
2000	Best Mixed Group	"Great!" (잘됐어)	Won
2001	Best Mixed Group	"100 Days Prayer" (백일기도)	Nominated
2002	Best Mixed Group	"Kiss Me" (내 입술..따뜻한 커피처럼)	Nominated
