= Lee Ji-hye =

South Korean singer and actress (born 1980)

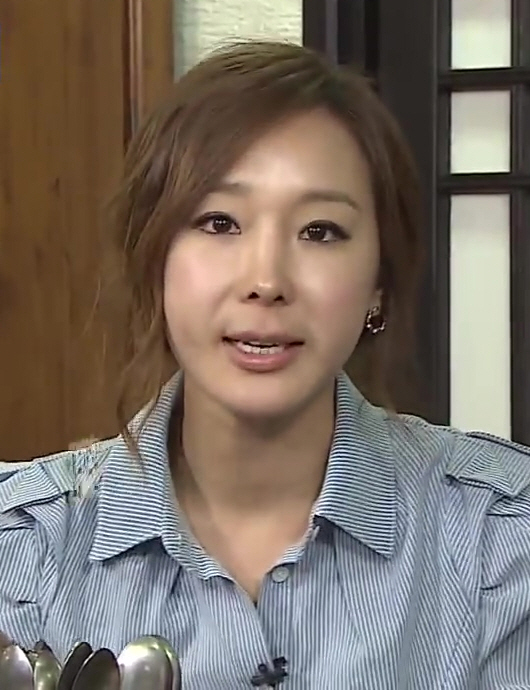

Background information
- Born: January 11, 1980 (age 45); Sindang-dong, Jung District, Seoul, South Korea
- Genres: Dance-pop
- Occupations: Singer, actress, MC
- Years active: 1998–present
- Formerly of: Sharp
- Spouse: Moon Jae-wan (m. 2017)

Korean name
- Hangul: 이지혜
- RR: I Jihye
- MR: I Chihye

Lee Ji-hye (Korean: 이지혜; born January 11, 1980) is a South Korean singer and actress. She was a member of the pop group Sharp. The group released six albums before their breakup in 2002, attributed to the feud between Lee and fellow female member Seo Ji-young due to bullying from the latter. As a solo artist, she has released several singles and a studio album, She was a cast member of the variety show Infinite Girls Season 2.

== Personal life ==
She has been married to Moon Jae-wan since September 18, 2017. She and her husband run a YouTube channel called "Attention Seeking Unnie You Don't Hate". Their first child, a daughter, was born in 2017; a second daughter was born on December 24, 2021.

In September 2022, she donated 50 million won to the Rom Khiao Children Foundation, together with her husband.

== Discography ==
=== Studio albums ===
Title	Album details	Peak chart positions	Sales
Title	Album details	KOR	Sales
Without You (그대 없이 난)	Released: May 4, 2005; Label: G Company; Formats: CD, cassette	20	KOR: 4,175

=== Singles ===
Title	Year	Peak chart positions		Sales	Album
Title	Year	KOR RIAK	KOR Gaon	Sales	Album
"Love Me Love Me"	2006	46	—	KOR: 1,184 (physical)	Special Single #+1
"Tears, Please Stop" (눈물아 제발 멈춰줘) feat. Jed of D.Bace	2010	—	66	—	Lost single album
"Just Because of Love" (사랑 하나때문에) feat. PK Heman	2010	—	71	—	Lost single album
"Rocket Power"	2011	—	—	—	Non-album singles
"Love Me Love Me" (Remix)	2014	—	—	—	Non-album singles
"True Love" (아니 그거 말고) feat. Coffee Boy	2015	—	—	—	Non-album singles
"For You" (나의 너에게)	2018	—	—	—	Non-album singles
"—" denotes release did not chart.

== Filmography ==
=== Television show ===
Year	Title	Role	Notes	Ref.
2021–2023	Divorced Singles	Host	Season 1–4	
2021	Free Doctor	Main Host	with Oh Sang-jin and Kim So-young	
2022	Mother Was Pretty	Host		
2022	Four Like	Host		
2022	Attack on Grandma	Special MC		
2022–present	Welcome, First Time Living in Korea	Host		
2022–present	Burning Trotman	Judge		

=== Web shows ===
Year	Title	Role	Ref.
2022	Scene Catchers	Host	
