= Tonight (Spica song) =

- Digital cover

Single by Spica
- Released: August 28, 2013
- Recorded: 2013
- Genre: K-pop, dance-pop
- Length: 3:43
- Label: B2M Entertainment
- Songwriter(s): Lee Hyori, Kim Boa
- Producer(s): Nermin Harambasic, Anne Judith Wik, GoodWill & MGI

Spica singles chronology
"Lonely" (2012)	"Tonight" (2013)	"You Don't Love Me" (2014)

Music video
- "Tonight" on YouTube

"Tonight" is the third digital single released by South Korean pop band Spica. It was released on August 28, 2013 under B2M Entertainment with distribution through CJ E&M Music and Live.

== Production ==
The preparation and creation of the song was the main subject of the reality television show "Lee Hyori X Unnie" on OnStyle Entertainment Channel. In the show, Lee Hyori, a long-established pop star and company colleague, provides counsel to the group, which had struggled to establish success as a group, on making decisions on every detail of a music single promotion, including song-writing, media relations, and styling. Lee Sang Soon, Lee Hyori's partner, was heavily featured on the show and lent his background vocals in the recording.

The song's lyrics were co-written with Lee Hyori and member, Kim Boa, with the original composition being completed by member and associates of Dsign Music.

== Release ==
On August 22, 2014, the teaser for the single and music video were released. The group members appeared in 1st Look Magazine with Lee Hyori to promote the release.

On August 28, 2014 (KST), the digital single, physical single and music video were made available to the public. The video was directed by Lumpens

== Reception ==
In its first week of release, the song peaked at #10 on Gaon Music Chart, which tracks the success of South Korean music, and was eight on the weekly online download rankings with 102,297 paid downloads from August 28–31 It would fail to make the top 100 digital singles of 2013.

SPICA would perform on "comeback stages", which moved Lee Hyori to tears, but didn’t win on KBS Music Bank, MBC Music Core, SBS Inkigayo, and Mnet M! Countdown.

The single continued a streak of limited success but did result in a top 10 single for the group. Both the song and music video did receive positive critical press, with a particular emphasis on the vocal quality of the recording and the colorful imagery of the video. One writer remarked on the competing themes: "Even though Spica's intent was probably to be liberating, it was still problematic because it detracted from the theme of innocent fun and instead felt dangerously close to voyeurism."
