= Russian Roulette (Spica EP) =

EP by Spica
- Released: February 8, 2012
- Recorded: 2011–2012
- Genre: K-pop; dance-pop; R&B
- Length: 20:25
- Label: B2M Entertainment

Spica chronology
Russian Roulette (2012)	Lonely (2012)

Singles from Russian Roulette
- 1. "Doggedly" Released: January 10, 2012; 2. "Russian Roulette" Released: February 8, 2012

Repackage cover for Painkiller

Singles from Painkiller
- 1. "Painkiller" Released: March 14, 2012

Russian Roulette is the first extended play and debut major release from South Korean girl group Spica. It was released on February 8, 2012 with the song of same name as the promotional song. The EP was re-released on March 29, 2012 with the name Painkiller. The song of same name was used to promote the re-release.

== Background ==
After releasing "Doggedly" as a prologue single, on January 31, 2012, B2M Entertainment officially announced that the group would have their formal debut with a mini-album, titled Russian Roulette. On February 2, a teaser video of the music video of "Russian Roulette" was released on B2M Entertainment's YouTube account. On the following days, more photos of the music video and concept of the mini album were released. The teaser caught the attention of the public due to the girls playing Russian roulette on a table. The music video was released one week after, on February 8, same day of mini-album's release. On the same day, B2M entertainment revealed more details of the members. After promoting "Russian Roulette", B2M Entertainment announced the re-release of the mini-album under the title Painkiller, with the song of the same name being the promotional song. The agency revealed some photos of the concept on March 26.

== Composition ==
"Russian Roulette", title song of the mini-album of same name, was written by Song Sooyoon and produced by Han Jaeho and Kim Seungsoo (also known as Sweetune). They are also known for producing songs for the groups Kara, f(x), Rainbow, SS501, Nine Muses, Infinite and more. "Painkiller", re-release's title song, was written by Kim Jinhee with Ring and composed by Ryan Jhun, David D.A Doman and WillIam David Porter. Ryan Hyun also produced other songs of the mini-album, such as "Hwa (Fire)" and "Up N Down". "Hwa (Fire)" was written by the group's leader Kim Bo Ah. "Diary" was written and produced by the member Kim Bohyung.

== Promotion ==
The group debuted on February 9, on Mnet's show M! Countdown. They also promoted the song "Russian Roulette" on the shows Music Bank, Music Core, Inkigayo, Music on Top and K-Pop Con. Promotions of "Russian Roulette" ended on March 11, on SBS' Inkigayo. On March 29, the group returned promoting the EP with the song "Painkiller" on M! Countdown. All promotions ended on April 22, on SBS' Inkigayo.

== Music video ==
Russian Roulette

On February 2, a teaser video of the music video of "Russian Roulette" was released on B2M Entertainment's YouTube account. The music video was released one week after, on February 8, same day of mini-album's release. In the music video, the girls are playing Russian roulette on a table with one lighted candle under. The girls also perform the song in 3 different studios. In the end, the member Juhyun got shot by the revolver and the candle under the table was cleared.

Painkiller A teaser of the video of "Painkiller" was released on March 24 on B2M Entertainment's YouTube account. The full music video was released on March 29, along with the mini-album re-release. In the music video, the girls performing the song in an empty street and also in a studio with black background. Also appears some solo shots of the girls on the empty street and under a white background with some incandescent lamps. In the end of the video, when Juhyun turns her head to the camera, the camera got some electrical defect and broke off alone, then the camera drops to the floor, interrupting its connection. The video ends with the name of the group (SPICA) and the song's name (Painkiller) appearing in a black screen.

== Controversy ==
During the promotions of "Russian Roulette", it was warned by the TV company MBC to change some parts of the lyrics of the song, since the original was deemed for broadcast. It was stated by the group's company, B2M Entertainment, explained that the lyrics in the track did not meet MBC broadcast standards. The parts in question were related to the desperate situation of the females in the video, and how a line about "holding one's breath" could be negatively interpreted as promoting suicide. In order to promote the song on Music Core, B2M Entertainment, Spica and the writers changed some parts of the song's lyrics.

== Track listing ==
Russian Roulette track listing
No.	Title	Lyrics	Music	Arrangement	Length
1.	"Anger" (Korean: 화; Hwa. Chinese: 火)	Kim Boa	Ryan Jhun, Antwann Frost, Brande Kelley	Ryan Jhun, Antwann Frost, Brande Kelley	3:03
2.	"Up N Down"	Kim Jinhee, Ring	Ryan Jhun, J Read Fasse, Nicolas Scapa, Michale John Dewey Hancock	Ryan Jhun, J Read Fasse, Nicolas Scapa, Michale John Dewey Hancock	3:31
3.	"Russian Roulette" (러시안룰렛; Reosian Rullet)	Song Sooyoon	Han Jaeho, Kim Seungsoo	Han Jaeho, Kim Seungsoo, Hong Seunghyun	3:30
4.	"No More"	Kim Jinhee, Ring	Ryan Jhun, Amanshia Nunoo, Drew Scalercio, David D.A. Doman	Ryan Jhun, Amanshia Nunoo, Drew Scalercio, David D.A. Doman	3:17
5.	"Diary" (일기장; Ilgijang)	Kim Bohyung	Kim Bohyung	Kim Bohyung	3:48
6.	"Doggedly" (독하게; Dokhage)	Gruzio	Gruzio	Yi Jihyun, Gruzio	3:18
Total length:					20:25

Painkiller track listing
No.	Title	Lyrics	Music	Arrangement	Length
1.	"Painkiller"	Kim Jinhee, Ring, Roberto Horns	Ryan Jhun, David D.A. Doman, William Porter Jr.	Ryan Jhun, David D.A. Doman, Roberto Horns	4:14
2.	"Anger" (Korean: 화; Chinese: 火)	Kim Boa	Ryan Jhun, Antwann Frost, Brande Kelley	Ryan Jhun, Antwann Frost, Brande Kelley	3:03
3.	"Up N Down"	Kim Jinhee, Ring	Ryan Jhun, J Read Fasse, Nicolas Scapa, Michale John Dewey Hancock	Ryan Jhun, J Read Fasse, Nicolas Scapa, Michale John Dewey Hancock	3:31
4.	"Russian Roulette" (러시안룰렛; Reosian Rullet)	Song Sooyoon	Han Jaeho, Kim Seungsoo	Han Jaeho, Kim Seungsoo, Hong Seunghyun	3:30
5.	"No More"	Kim Jinhee, Ring	Ryan Jhun, Amanshia Nunoo, Drew Scalercio, David D.A. Doman	Ryan Jhun, Amanshia Nunoo, Drew Scalercio, David D.A. Doman	3:17
6.	"Diary" (일기장; Ilgijang)	Kim Bohyung	Kim Bohyung	Kim Bohyung	3:48
7.	"Doggedly" (독하게; Dokhage)	Gruzio	Gruzio	Yi Jihyun, Gruzio	3:18
8.	"Painkiller" (Instrumental)		Ryan Jhun, David D.A. Doman, WillIam David Porter	Ryan Jhun, David D.A. Doman, WillIam David Porter	4:14
Total length:					29:04

== Charts ==
=== Russian Roulette ===
==== Album ====
Chart	Peak position
Gaon Weekly album chart	46
Gaon Monthly album chart	36

==== Sales and certifications ====
Chart	Amount
Gaon physical sales	2,500+

=== Painkiller ===
==== Album chart ====
Chart	Peak position
Gaon Weekly album chart	12
Gaon Monthly album chart	35

==== Sales and certifications ====
Chart	Amount
Gaon physical sales	2,350+

== Release history ==
Country	Date	Format	Label
South Korea	February 8, 2012	Digital download, CD	B2M Entertainment LOEN Entertainment
South Korea	March 29, 2012 (Painkiller)	Digital download, CD	B2M Entertainment LOEN Entertainment
