= You Don't Love Me (Spica song) =

- Digital song cover

Single by Spica
- Released: January 27, 2014
- Recorded: 2013
- Genre: K-pop; dance-pop
- Length: 4:01
- Label: B2M Entertainment
- Songwriters: Lee Hyori; Kim Boa
- Producer: Lee Hyori

Spica singles chronology
"Tonight" (2013)	"You Don't Love Me" (2014)	"I Did It" (2014)

Music video
- "You Don't Love Me" on YouTube

"You Don't Love Me" is the fourth digital single released by South Korean pop band Spica. It was released on January 27, 2014, under B2M Entertainment with distribution through CJ E&M Music and Live.

== Production ==
The single followed their August 2013 "Tonight", as well as their feature as the subject of the reality television show "Lee Hyori X Unnie". The song is a continuation of that relationship between artist and company colleague Lee Hyori. The song's lyrics were co-written with Lee Hyori and member, Kim Boa, with the original composition being completed by Lee Hyori. It marked the first single in which Lee Hyori compose, write and produce a song for Spica. The song is arranged by Kim Do-Hyun.

Although a December 2013 release was scheduled, many lyrics were edited and re-recorded due to potential censorship.

== Release ==
On January 23, 2014, B2M released a statement announcing the digital single to be released on the 27th. with a video teaser uploaded the same day.

On 27 January (KST), the digital single, physical single and music video were made available to the public. The video was directed by Lumpens, who had previously directed their video for Tonight, and was rated 15+.

On February 6, 2014, the group released a behind-the-scenes video revealing a sample of the comical dance scenes in the music video.

== Reception ==
As of February 6, 2014, the single has peaked at #16 on the Gaon Music Chart, which tracks the success of South Korean music. On the February 10th episode of Ingikayo, a weekly music competition, the single placed third, further denying the group their first win on a weekly music show. The song was also performed at Show! Music Core on February 2, at M! Countdown on February 6, at Arirang Radio on February 4, at The Show All About Kpop on February 4, at Show Champion on February 5, and at Music Bank on February 7.

Despite the limited financial success, the single was well received by fans and press. MTV remarked on the influence of American soul music on both the musical and visual style of the single. Other reviewers praised the vocal execution by the group members and the lighthearted social commentary on the objectification of women.
