= Spica (group) =

South Korean girl group

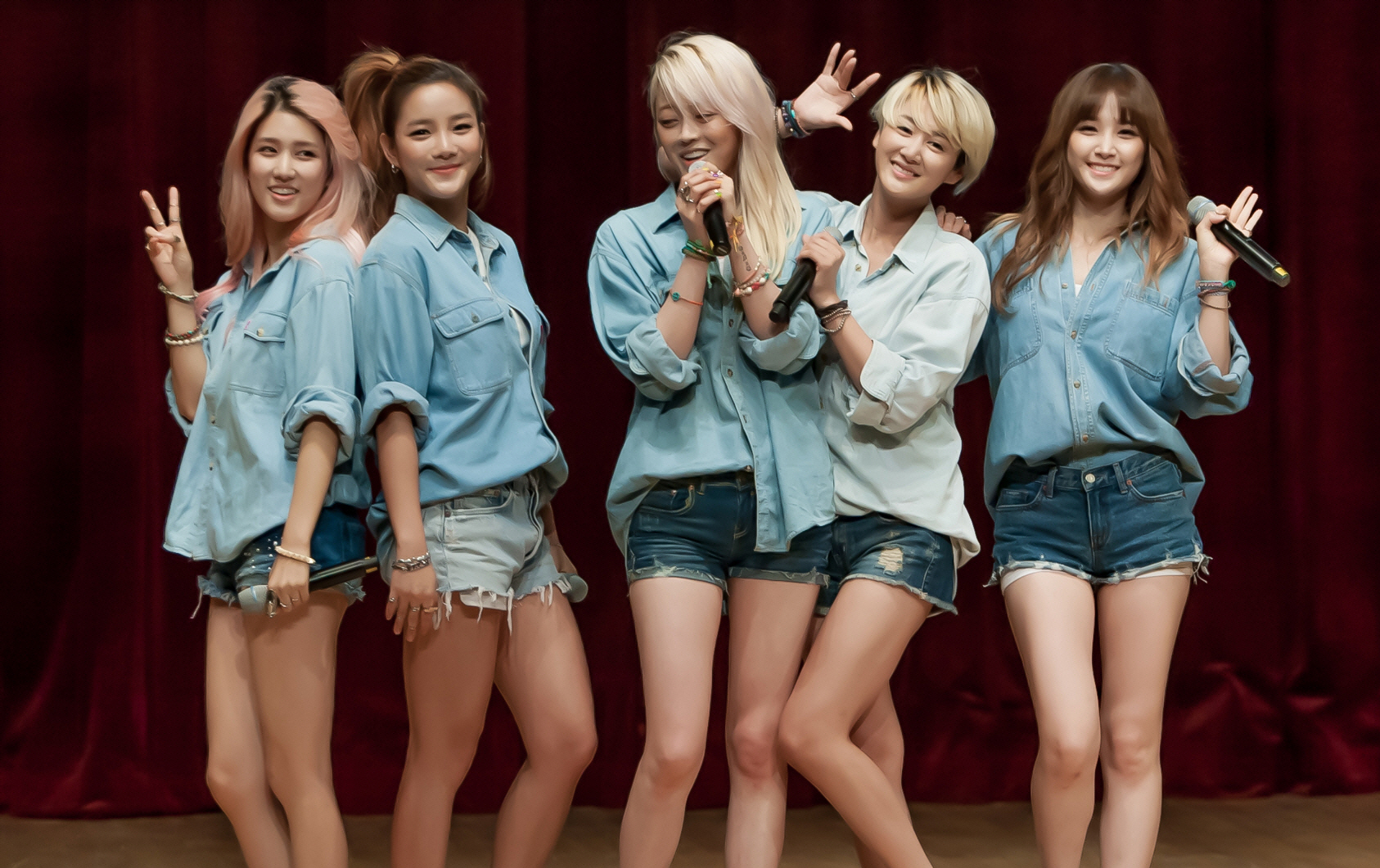
- Spica on September 27, 2013 (L-R) Jiwon, Bohyung, Boa, Sihyun, Narae

Background information
- Origin: Seoul, South Korea
- Genres: K-pop; R&B; dance
- Years active: 2012–2017
- Labels: CJ E&M; B2M; ASA Music LLC
- Spinoffs: Spica.S
- Past members: Kim Bo-a; Park Si-hyun; Park Na-rae; Yang Ji-won; Kim Bo-hyung

Spica (Korean: 스피카, stylized as SPICA) was a South Korean girl group formed in 2012 under B2M Entertainment. The group consists of Kim Bo-a, Park Si-hyun, Park Na-rae, Yang Ji-won and Kim Bo-hyung. Their pre-debut single "Doggedly" was released on January 10, 2012, followed by their debut mini-album, Russian Roulette, on February 8, 2012. After five years of group activities, they officially disbanded on February 6, 2017, though Bohyung has confirmed a possible reunion in the future.

== History ==
=== 2012: Debut and further releases ===
In the beginning of 2012, B2M Entertainment announced that they would debut a girl group. Their name is a reference to Spica, the brightest star in the constellation of Virgo. On January 10, 2012, the group released their first digital single, "Doggedly" (독하게; also translated "Potently"). The music video sparked high interest, as their fellow label-mate Lee Hyori made an appearance.

On January 31, B2M Entertainment announced that the group would have their formal debut with a mini-album, titled Russian Roulette. The full-length music video was released on February 7. Promotions for "Russian Roulette" began two days later on M! Countdown. The lyrics of the song were later modified in order to meet MBC's broadcasting standards. The group released a repackaged extended play entitled Painkiller on March 29, promoting the title track of the same name.

Spica returned with their second EP titled Lonely on November 21, promoting the title track of the same name. They worked again with Sweetune, who also produced "Russian Roulette". The group first promoted the song on Music Bank on November 23 and held the "goodbye performance" on January 6 on Inkigayo. Other songs on the album are "With You", written by Kim Bo-a, "That Night" (그날 밤), written by Kim Bo-hyung, and "Since You're Out of My Life". The album peaked at number 8 on Gaon's weekly album chart, selling 2,113 physical copies.

=== 2013–2014: Digital singles and US debut ===
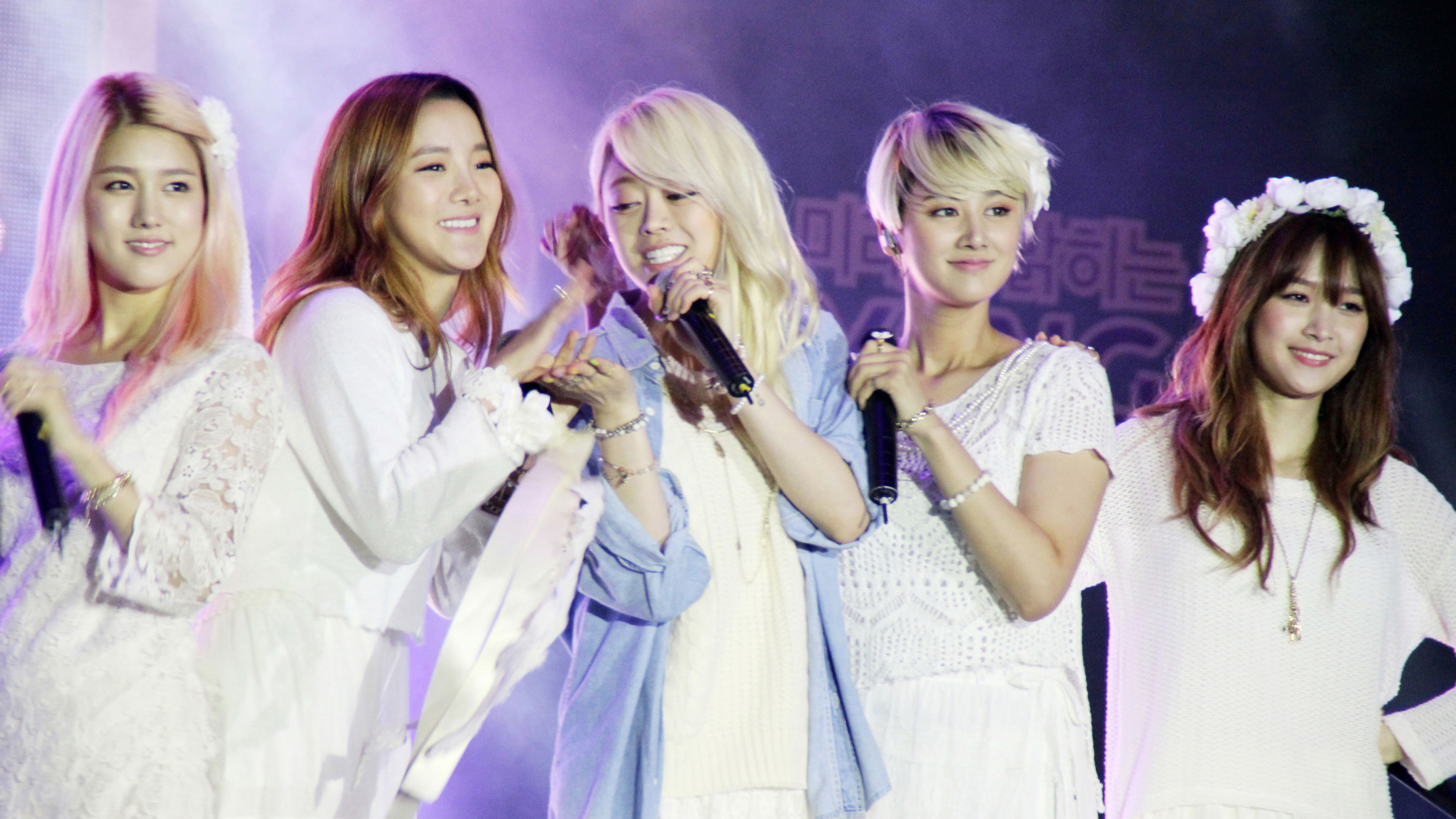
Spica performing at the 2013 Yangju Cotton Festival

In the summer of 2013, Spica was the subject of OnStyle's TV show Lee Hyori X Unnie in which they sought and received guidance from the former Fin.K.L member, Lee Hyori. The show was shot following Lee Hyori's promotion period for Monochrome and culminated in the band's comeback in August. On August 27, B2M Entertainment released a digital single, "Tonight", along with a music video which Lee Hyori and her husband, Lee Sangsun, collaborated and produced. Tonight's lyrics are written by Boa and Lee Hyori, and the original song was written by Dsign Music. On August 30 Spica had their comeback performance at Music Bank and made Lee Hyori cry for them. With this single, the group was able to reach the top 10 in the Gaon Music Chart for the week of August 25–31, ranking tenth overall and eighth on the Downloads Chart with 102,297 downloads.

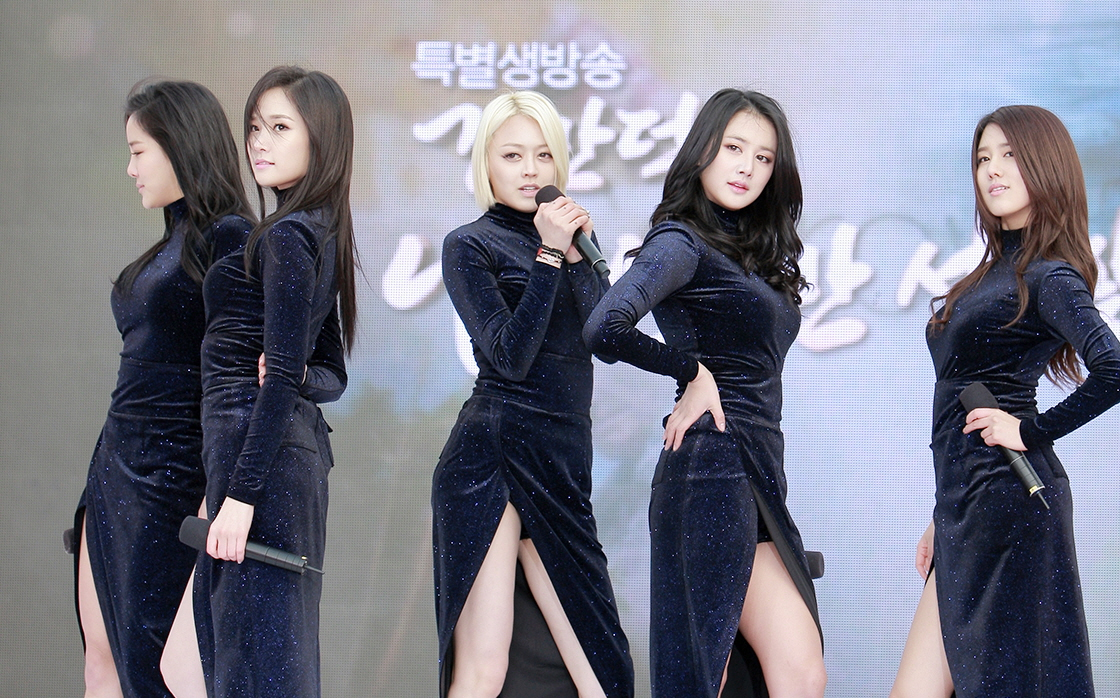
Spica in the Seoul Square on February 13, 2014

On January 26, 2014, Spica released "You Don't Love Me", a single musically and visually influenced by soul music of the 1960s. The song is a continuation of their relationship with the Lee Hyori and her production team, with the lyrics co-written by Kim Bo-a and Lee Hyori. Spica also released a song for the original soundtrack of the Korean drama A Witch's Love called "Witch's Diary."

In August, Spica partnered with Billboard to release their first English-language single. The single, "I Did It", was produced by Oliver Goldstein, Cory Enemy and Daniel Merlot. The song and its music video were released August 6, and the group made their U.S. debut performance at KCON. Ryan Book of The Music Times said the song "takes a very Beyoncé attitude, expressing themes of female empowerment with pop music".

In November 5, the entire group released the digital single "Ghost", produced by Sweetune. The music video was directed by Lee Sa-gang and featured scenes of the group during the 2014 Spring/Summer Seoul Fashion Week at Dongdaemun Design Plaza.

=== 2015–2017: Last activities and disbandment ===
In 2015, member Park Si-hyun and Cao Lu (former Fiestar member) collaborated on The Secret Weapon and performed Uhm Junghwa's "Invitation".

In March 2015, Spica provide the song "Because of You" for the Super Daddy Yeol OST.

In December 2015, Spica signed an exclusive contract with CJ E&M. On March 25, Spica attended KCON Abu Dhabi along with other artists. In February 2016, it was reported that Spica would release a new mini-album in April 2016, but the album was delayed and was never released.

Member Bo-hyung became one of the contestants on JTBC singing competition show Girl Spirit, that aims to highlight the main vocalists of lesser-known girl groups. The first episode premiered on July 19, 2016. She eventually won the competition.

On August 25, 2016, Spica made their first comeback after a two-years hiatus with the release of a digital single titled Secret Time. Following that, they hold their first Japanese showcase on December 4 at the same year at The Tokyo Astro Hall. The group did a cover of Utada Hikaru's "Flavor of Life" specially for the showcase. They also performed a five-member version of Spica.S's "Give Your Love"

On February 6, 2017, CJ E&M announced that the group had disbanded, and the members would be going their separate ways. On February 8, 2017, the group posted a letter on Instagram, confirming that they would return again in the future.

== Former members ==
- Park Si-hyun (박시현)
- Kim Bo-a (김보아)
- Park Na-rae (박나래)
- Yang Ji-won (양지원)
- Kim Bo-hyung (김보형)

== Subgroup Spica.S ==
In September 2014, B2M Entertainment formed a subgroup of Spica named Spica.S (Spica Special). The subgroup is composed of four members: Park Si-hyun, Park Na-rae, Yang Ji-won, and Kim Bo-hyung. On September 11, 2014, the subgroup released their debut single, "Give Your Love" produced by Brave Brothers.

== Discography ==
=== Extended plays ===
Title	Album details	Peak chart positions	Sales
Title	Album details	KOR	Sales
Russian Roulette	Released: February 8, 2012; Label: B2M Entertainment, LOEN Entertainment; Format: CD, digital download	46	KOR: 2,326
Russian Roulette	Re-released: March 29, 2012 (Painkiller); Label: B2M Entertainment, LOEN Entertainment; Format: CD, digital download	12	KOR: 2,284
Lonely	Released: November 21, 2012; Label: B2M Entertainment, LOEN Entertainment; Format: CD, digital download	8	KOR: 2,113

=== Singles ===
Title	Year	Peak chart positions		Sales (digital download)	Album
Title	Year	KOR	Billboard K-Pop	Sales (digital download)	Album
Korean
"Doggedly (독하게)"	2012	50	57	KOR: 204,391	Russian Roulette
"Russian Roulette (러시안 롤렛)"	2012	36	39	KOR: 611,004	Russian Roulette
"Painkiller"	2012	60	65	KOR: 120,494	Painkiller
"I'll Be There"	2012	42	45	KOR: 344,634	Non-album single
"Lonely"	2012	38	50	KOR: 196,648	Lonely
"Tonight"	2013	10	9	KOR: 355,134	Non-album singles
"You Don’t Love Me"	2014	16	19	KOR: 381,912	Non-album singles
"Give Your Love" (Subgroup: Spica.S)	2014	92	—	KOR: 46,055	Non-album singles
"Ghost"	2014	59	—	KOR: 33,391	Non-album singles
"Secret Time"	2016	117	—	KOR: 15,349	Non-album singles
English
"I Did It"	2014	—	—		Non-album single
Spica.S (sub-unit)
"Give Your Love"	2014	—	—		Non-album single

=== Soundtrack appearances ===
Title	Year	Peak chart positions	Sales (Digital download)	Album
Title	Year	KOR	Sales (Digital download)	Album
"Your Dance" (feat. Space Cowboy)	2013	—		Dancing 9 OST
"A Witch's Diary"	2014	50	KOR: 47,512	A Witch's Love OST
"Because of You"	2015	57	KOR: 40,413	Super Daddy Yeol OST
"—" denotes releases that did not chart or were not released in that region.

== Videography ==
=== Music videos ===
Title	Year	Director(s)
Korean
"Doggedly"	2012	Kim Chol
"Russian Roulette"	2012	Chul K
"Painkiller"	2012	Eun You Kim
"I'll Be There"	2012	Eun You Kim
"Lonely"	2012	Eun You Kim
"Tonight"	2013	Lumpens
"You Don’t Love Me"	2014	Lee Won-joo (Lumpens)
"Give Your Love" (Subgroup: Spica.S)	2014	Kim Seoun-guk (Lumpens)
"Ghost"	2014	Lee Sa-gang
"Secret Time"	2016	Go Yoo-jeong (Lumpens)
English
"I Did It"	2014	Michael Laburt

== Awards and nominations ==
=== Mnet Asian Music Awards ===
Year	Nominee / work	Award	Result
2012	Spica	Best New Female Artist	Nominated
