= Soul People (band) =

South Korean male vocal group

- Origin: South Korea
- Genres: K-pop
- Years active: 2012–present
- Labels: Chungchun Music, CJ E&M
- Members: Bae Jae-hyun; Park Ji-yong; Kwon Tae-hyun

Soul People (Korean: 소울사람들), formerly known as Honey G (Korean: 허니지), is a South Korean male vocal group formed in 2012. Their members consist of Bae Jae-hyun, Park Ji-yong and Kwon Tae-hyun. Soul People released their first album, 1st Album on August 22, 2013.

== Discography ==
=== Studio albums ===
| Title | Album details | Peak chart positions | Sales |
| Title | Album details | KOR | Sales |
|---|---|---|---|
| 1st Album | Released: August 22, 2013; Label: Chungchun Music; Formats: CD, digital download; Track listing: 1. 허니지 비긴즈; 2. 그대 (My Love); 3. 넌 내꺼야 (She's Mine); 4. 바보야 (Baboya); 5. 늑대; 6. 열대야; 7. 술이 그립다; 8. 배고파; 9. 결혼하는 날 10. 무드송 | 44 | KOR: 1,570 |

=== Singles ===
| Title | Year | Peak chart positions | Sales | Album |
| Title | Year | KOR | Sales | Album |
|---|---|---|---|---|
| "My Love" (그대) | 2013 | 35 | KOR: 52,839 | 1st Album |
| "Baboya" (바보야) | 2013 | 33 | KOR: 91,235 | 1st Album |
| "Don't Wanna Be Your Friend" (편해지지 않아) | 2016 | — | —N/a | Non-album singles |
| "Healing You" (힐링유) | 2017 | — | —N/a | Non-album singles |
| "Be Your Light" (빛이되어) | 2018 | — | —N/a | Non-album singles |
| "Love Never Lies" | 2019 | — | —N/a | Non-album singles |
| "Starlight" | 2019 | — | —N/a | Non-album singles |
| "OK" (ㅇㅋ) feat. Park Daye | 2019 | — | —N/a | Non-album singles |
"—" denotes release did not chart.

== Filmography ==
=== TV series ===
| Date | Title | Role | Network |
|---|---|---|---|
| 2012 | Superstar K4 | Themselves | Mnet |
