= B2M Entertainment =

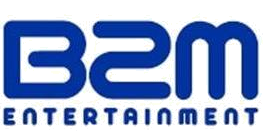
- Founded: 2010
- Founder: Gil Jong-hwa
- Defunct: June 30, 2017; 7 years ago
- Status: Inactive
- Genre: K-pop; Dance; R&B
- Country of origin: South Korea
- Location: 612-29, Banpo-4-dong, Seocho-gu, Seoul

B2M Entertainment (Korean: B2M 엔터테인먼트) was a South Korean record label founded in 2010 by Gil Jong-hwa.

== History ==
B2M Entertainment was originally founded as Gil Entertainment. The company changed its name to B2M Entertainment right after Lee Hyori joined it. The company was founded in 2010 by Gil Jong-hwa, who formerly worked for DSP Media and handled the management of several artists, including Sechs Kies, Fin.K.L, SS501 and Kara.

Fin.K.L's former member Lee Hyori joined B2M Entertainment in early 2010 to work with Gil Jong-hwa, who had been Fin.K.L's co-manager and had worked with the group since its debut. SS501's Heo Young-Saeng and Kim Kyu-Jong joined B2M Entertainment in the same year.

B2M Entertainment formed the five-member girl group Spica in January 2012. Eric Nam joined B2M Entertainment in September 2012 after finishing in the top 5 on the Korean TV show 'Star Audition: Birth of a Great Star - Season 2' and made his official debut on January 23, 2013.

In September 2014, B2M Entertainment formed Spica's first sub-unit group "Spica.S" (Spica Special), consisting of 4 members: Park Si-Hyun, Park Narae, Yang Jiwon, and Kim Bohyung, while Kim Boa was to debut as a solo artist. Following this, Nicole Jung joined B2M Entertainment eight months after leaving KARA and made her official solo debut on November 19, 2014.

In July 2015, B2M Entertainment formed a strategic alliance with CJ E&M Music subsidiary MMO Entertainment (now Wake One Entertainment). In November 2016, Eric Nam, Spica, and co-managed artists from CJ E&M, SG Wannabe and Davichi transferred to CJ E&M label MMO Entertainment, while Nicole Jung stayed with B2M Entertainment. In April 2017, B2M Entertainment former trainees was introduced as MMO Entertainment trainees in Produce 101 season 2. On June 30, 2017, B2M officially shut down. Founder Gil Jong-hwa later began working as an executive producer of Stone Music Entertainment.

== Former artists ==
- Lee Hyori (2010–2013)
- Heo Young Saeng (2010–2015)
- Kim Kyu Jong (2010–2016)
- Spica (2012–2017)
- Nicole Jung (2014–2017)
