= Cleo (group) =

South Korean girl group

- Also known as: 클레오
- Origin: Seoul, South Korea
- Genres: K-pop
- Years active: 1999–2005 • 2023–present
- Label: Doremi Media StarMade Entertainment
- Members: Chae Eunjung Kim Dajeong Gu Dokyung
- Past members: Kim Hana; Park Yeeun; Han Hyunjung; Jung Yebin; Dini

Cleo (Korean: 클레오) is a three-member South Korean girl group, debuted in May 1, 1999. The name of the group Cleo is the acronym of Come Listen EveryOne. They were one of the original Korean idol girl groups and were active at the same time as Fin.K.L and S.E.S. and other prominent and known groups like Baby V.O.X.,Diva, and Chakra. Although they weren't as popular or talked about as those mentioned above, they were usually mentioned alongside groups like T.T.Ma, M.I.L.K., and Papaya.

Their debut song, "Good Time", from their first studio album, was very successful. The group's second album, released in 2000, was also successful and included the songs "Ready For Love", "Always in My Heart", and "Mosun" (모순; lit. "Contradiction"). Cleo's third album, which included the song "Triple", was released in 2001. Their fourth album was released in 2003, included the tracks "Donghwa" (동화; lit. "Fairy Tale") and "S.P.Y". Their fifth album, Rising Again, was released in 2004 and included the song "In and Out". The group disbanded in 2005.

In November 2011, the three original members reunited to appear on an episode of SBS Plus' Comeback Show Top 10. In June 2016, Jung Ye-bin (now using her real name, Gong Seo-young), Chae Eun-jung, and Kim Ha-na appeared on Two Yoo Project Sugar Man, performing "Good Time".

In October 2023, Member Chae Eun Jung announced their comeback after 17 years.

== "Good Time" ==
Before their debut, the initial concept of the group was an R&B trio. However, the CEO of their agency decided to switch to a fairy concept after considering the trend of girl groups at the time. They changed their debut song to "Good Time" and directed the concept to be more fairy-like.

Despite Chae Eun-jung being the center of the group since their debut, the actual leader and center of the group was Park Ye-eun. Park Ye-eun had a lot of connections in the music industry and directly cast Chae Eun-jung on the street before adding Kim Ha-na to the group through an audition.

The title track of their first album was "Good Time", a catchy song that became very popular among female students in grades 1 to 9 who were born between 1982 and 1989, after Fin.K.L, S.E.S., and Baby Vox. Despite its upbeat melody, the lyrics were quite explicit at the time, saying that they wanted to spend the night with someone but needed their parents' permission.

During their first album activities, they managed to secure a considerable number of fans, especially among female students, and their fan base was rare among girl groups at that time. There were other groups that debuted around the same time with a similar concept to Cleo, but most of them failed shortly after, while Cleo unexpectedly succeeded with their first album, paving the way for their second album.

== Line-up change and second album ==
After finishing their first album activities with the song "Only When You Love Me (니가 나를 꼭 사랑할때만)," Park Ye-eun left the group, and they recruited Han Hyun-jung as a new member for their second album. It seems they judged that they couldn't survive with just the innocence of the girl concept from their first album, so they immediately shifted their concept towards a mature and sexy direction for their second album.

== "Ready For Love" ==
The second album era of Cleo is considered the best period in the group's history, and it is a memorable activity that secured popularity and recognition among the public in the 2010s. It was from the second album "Ready For Love" that the positions of the members were established. The early 2000s mark the peak of Cleo's heyday, and a substantial amount of material from the second album era is available on YouTube.

The biggest feature of the second album was the emergence of Kim Hana. However, some fans were disappointed that they abandoned the innocent concept too quickly. From this album, Cleo transformed from an idol group aiming for popularity to a mature and sexy group, and the fandom also gradually transformed into a male-dominated fandom. However, female fans still showed considerable support.

Chae Eun-jung, who was already the most popular member since the first album and ranked high in the popularity ranking of girl group members, transformed her innocent image from the first album to a mature image by dyeing her hair blonde for "Ready For Love." However, since her image as cute was too strong from the first album and she had many male fans, her efforts to change her image were only accepted as a cute deviation by the fandom. In the end, she achieved half of her success, but her blonde hair made a deep impression that her name automatically brings up blonde hair in people's minds.

Han Hyun-jung, the new member who joined to replace Park Ye-eun, had a strikingly pretty appearance, unique falsetto singing style, and decent dance skills. However, surprisingly, her contribution to the album activity was not as significant as expected. However, her strength was her facial expressions and solo gestures on stage, which made her stand out from other members.

"Ready For Love" is a fast-paced Euro dance song that helped make Cleo a popular girl group in the early 2000s. In fact, this song is highly regarded among both Cleo's core fans and those who later became fans, and is often considered their best song. It received a lot of attention and even made it to the top of the charts on terrestrial TV. Despite being active during a time when many top singers were also active, Cleo managed to achieve a high ranking on the charts, which proves that they could have achieved even higher success if the timing had been better.

The song is known for its lively and catchy melody and easy-to-remember lyrics, and was one of the most popular songs for school trips at the time, along with "Good Time" from their first album. This activity marked the beginning of Cleo's heyday, as they maintained steady popularity even during the comebacks of larger girl groups. Their fandom grew significantly, and they were second only to the rookie group Chakra among second-tier girl groups at the time. However, unlike Chakra, Cleo did not have any special ties to commercial endorsements.

=== "Ready For Love" Wardrobe Malfunction ===
There was a broadcasting accident during their performance on SBS Inkigayo. Chae Eun-jung's top kept slipping down and could have caused a major problem if not for her quick thinking. She managed to cover herself with one hand while continuing the dance, and even showed off a special performance at the end, receiving praise from fans for her professionalism. This incident became a talking point among fans. The choreography for "Ready For Love" was more powerful and challenging than the static choreography of their first album.

== "Mosun" (Irony) ==
The second title track "Mosun" (Irony) (lit. "Contradiction") was a song inspired by the Latin music trend that was popular worldwide at the time. As the follow-up activities did well, the group gained momentum. However, there were concerns from the public about trying to transform from a lively image to a sexy one, as it overlapped with Baek Ji-young, who was also active in Latin dance music at the time. Nevertheless, the group succeeded in gaining independent popularity alongside Baek Ji-young. For those who became fans with their second album, "Ready for Love" is also considered a fan favorite song.

"Ready for Love" is a highly popular song that formed a major part of Cleo's discography alongside "Contradiction." However, the song included in the album and the music video and broadcast performance songs were quite different. The album version is closer to a dance song with inserted Latin music elements and a similar beat, but without Han Hyun-jung's chorus part. The remix version used in the music video and broadcast performances is more upbeat and features a passionate sound similar to carnival music. The remix version's quality is so excellent that most people, whether Cleo fans or not, prefer it upon first hearing it. The parts were also redistributed, giving Han Hyun-jung an equal share of the chorus part.

== "Always In My Heart" ==
The third follow-up song, "Always In My Heart," is a track from Cleo's second album, even though they didn't promote it as much as their energetic and fast-paced songs. It's a medium-tempo song where the three members' vocals blend in perfectly.

Although the song was not edited for cable TV broadcasts, it was heavily edited for terrestrial TV broadcasts, which upset some fans who couldn't understand why such a great song was treated unfairly. During their promotions for this song, the members' hairstyles changed, becoming similar to those in their third album's jacket photos, indicating that they were already preparing for their third album.

Their second album firmly established Cleo's image and contributed greatly to their success, with appropriate sales and popularity that remained relevant even in the 2010s. Despite having a sizable fandom, they were overshadowed by other girl groups with larger fan bases like Fin.K.L, S.E.S., and Baby Vox. Nevertheless, Cleo's name was still mentioned among male students who debated about which girl group was the best.

== "Triple" and "Sok 속" ==
The popularity and recognition of the group started to decline after their third album, which was released in 2001. The title track of their third album, "Triple," was a techno dance song with high-pitched vocals and a fast beat. The group aimed to transform their image from their previous playful style to a more mature and sexy image.

However, at that time, dance songs were becoming less popular and ballads were taking over. Additionally, the atmosphere of their third album was darker than their previous album, and many of the songs were overly hyped and did not gain much popularity. Their attempt to appeal with a sexy concept for their follow-up song, "Sok (속)," also did not receive much response.

The originally planned title track was "Crazy Love," which was in line with their first and second albums and was a song the members liked. However, the decision was made to go with "Triple" as the title track, probably with the club market in mind. This decision backfired, and the song did not gain much public popularity, although it was somewhat popular in clubs.

Overall, their third album tried different styles, including ballads, Indian music, and Eurodance, but some songs were criticized for not meeting expectations, and the melodies were confusing and difficult to adapt to for fans who were used to their previous upbeat melodies.

Fans who had high expectations for their third album, especially after the success of their second album, were disappointed. The album's quality was not up to par, and their performances on TV shows were also disappointing. However, the group's loyal fan base remained, and the album did not cause them to lose many fans.

During their third album promotion, MBC Music Camp was cancelled due to the YeonJeHup labor dispute and they were unable to perform live because the show switched to a pre-recorded format. When promoting their title track "Triple", their appearances were cancelled, and when they moved on to their follow-up track "Sok", they had to switch to a pre-recorded format. They were also unable to perform on Music Bank during their third album promotion, and other singers who performed songs with difficult choreography or high notes were also unable to appear on Music Camp. Some singers even had to change their concept for their live performances.

== "Fairy Tale" ==
Two years after their third album release, Cleo released their fourth studio album in 2003. The album was initially released using the unfamiliar concept of digital singles before the album was released. This strategy was successful, and the digital singles were highly praised and sold out, allowing them to successfully release the fourth album.

The title song, "Fairy Tale," was sung from the perspective of a girlfriend who sang about her boyfriend's infidelity. The lyrics and melody matched well with the feelings of many couples, making it a highly popular song among female students. It even entered the ranking system called Take 7, which replaced the discontinued ranking system of SBS Inkigayo.

During that time, "Fairy Tale" was a popular song that girls sang at karaoke or added to their backgrounds on websites like Cyworld. This song showed new potential for Cleo, as it was a popular song that remained among first-generation girl groups.

The fourth album was an effort to reproduce the glory of the second album, and the members had significantly improved their skills. During this period, they performed live for the first time since their debut, and their variety show activities were also active.

=== Chae Eun-jung's departure ===
After the fourth album activities ended, original member Chae Eun-jung left the group. Her departure was a significant loss for the group because she was the face of Cleo and had the highest popularity. After Chae Eun-jung left, only Kim Ha-na, the last original member, remained.

== New member change, "In & Out" and disbandment ==
After the departure of Chae Eun-jung, the group recruited a new member named Jung Ye-bin (Gong Seo-young) and released their fifth studio album 'Rising Again' in 2004 with the title track 'In & Out.' The album did not sell well due to a lack of promotion by the agency, which was not up to par with the other rising groups at the time.

Ultimately, the group's 5th album ended without any significant activities, and they disappeared into obscurity two years later in 2006 but it was said that they have disbanded in 2005.

== Post-disbandment activities ==
In 2011, the group announced their comeback through the program "Comeback Show Top 10" on SBS Plus. The returning members were the original members Kim Ha-na, Chae Eun-jung, and Park Ye-eun.

In 2014, while appearing on the MBC variety show "Sebakwi (세바퀴)," Jung Ye-bin (Gong Seo-young) mentioned the group's failed album and revealed that they had planned to release a 6th album but decided to disband to pursue other paths.

In 2016, Cleo members Kim Hana, Chae Eun-jung, and Gong Seo-yeong appeared as the Hee-yeol team on the show "Two Yoo Project Sugar Man." In the show, Kim Ha-na revealed that after disbandment, she had fun and eventually got married. While Chae Eun-jung went to Hong Kong and became a member of a group called Girls' Kingdom along with Japanese model Anna Kubo. Gong Seo-young is now a sports anchorwoman and has also appeared in various Korean dramas. Han Hyun-jung had some personal issues that made it difficult for her to appear, and Park Ye-eun was someone who always preferred a regular person's life.

In addition to the Sugar Song "Good Time," other songs such as "Ready For Love," "Contradiction," and "Fairy Tale" were mentioned throughout the broadcast, and a medley of hit songs was performed. Overall, compared to other girl groups active at the same time, their popularity wasn't significantly higher, but their awareness was deeply ingrained in the public's mind, even after more than 10 years, making them a group that continued to be popular.

During the show, Kim Hana and Chae Eun-jung reminisced about how they fought a lot during their team activities because they were sensitive to each other, but they didn't have any big fights. They remembered how they fought over trivial things like clothing choices and tiring schedules. Gong Seo-yeong, who was a successor member, also said that neither of the older members ever scolded her, but they were both intimidating, which made them burst out laughing.

When asked if they would come back again as CLEO, Kim Hana said no.

Interestingly, Chae Eun-jung's stage name, as well as the group name Cleo, were actually created by the original member Park Ye-eun.

== Comeback after 17 years - "NEW CLEO" ==
On October 12, 2023, Chae Eunjung announced, through their Instagram account, the reformation of CLEO. She revealed the two new members, Dini and Dokyung as fourth generation members.

On September 2, 2024, after almost a year, CLEO released their first digital single, "You're Mine". It is the group's first release in 17 years.

On July 29, 2025, the group officially introduces their new member, Kim Dajeong, replacing Dini. Dajeong is a former member and the leader of girl group, Hashtag.

== Achievements and other accolades ==
Cleo's achievements include reaching the 10th spot on the SBS Inkigayo chart in the first week of July 1999, and the 11th spot on the MBC Music Camp chart.

In 2000, Cleo was nominated as the Best Female Group during the 2000 Mnet Music Video Festival with their song, "Contradiction." Fin.K.L won with "Now."

In 2004, Cleo's 'In & Out' video was nominated alongside Hey Boy by Diva, Xcstasy by Baby Vox, and Secret by Sugar for the Mnet KM Music Video Festival's Best Female Group Video, which was won by Sugar.

== Members ==
- Kim Ha-na (김하나) (Leader, Lead Vocalist, Rap)
- Park Ye-eun (박예은)
- Chae Eun-jung (채은정) (Main Vocalist, Main Dancer)
- Han Hyun-jung (한현정) (Lead Vocalist)
- Jung Ye-bin (정예빈)

2023 - present

- Dini (디니)
- Dokyung (도영)
- Chae Eun-jung (채은정) (Original member)
- Kim Dajeong (김다정)

== Discography ==
=== Studio albums ===
Title	Album details	Peak chart positions	Sales
Title	Album details	KOR (Note: The Recording Industry Association of Korea (RIAK) tracked physical album, EP, and singles sales and released a consolidated sales and ranking chart monthly from January 1999 to September 2008. It did not track digital-only sales.)	Sales
Cleo	Released: March 3, 1999; Label: Doremi; Format: CD, cassette	25	KOR: 32,899
Good Time	Released: March 20, 2000; Label: Doremi; Format: CD, cassette	22	KOR: 48,420
Crazy Love	Released: July 7, 2001; Label: Doremi; Format: CD, cassette	— (Note: The RIAK chart for July 2001 was not archived)	
Surprise Party	Released: March 18, 2003; Label: Gaonix; Format: CD, cassette	14	KOR: 24,291
Rising Again	Released: July 10, 2004; Label: EMI Records; Format: CD, cassette	45	KOR: 2,432

=== Music videos ===
Title	Year
"Good Time"	1999
"Ready For Love"	2000
"Always in My Heart"	2000
"Mosun" (모순; lit. "Contradiction")	2000
"Triple"	2001
"Donghwa" (동화; lit. "Fairy Tale")	2003
"In and Out"	2004
"You're Mine"	2024
