= Now (Fin.K.L album) =

Studio album by Fin.K.L
- Released: October 6, 2000
- Recorded: 2000
- Genres: K-pop; dance-pop
- Length: 49:54
- Language: Korean
- Label: DSP Media

Fin.K.L chronology
| White (1999) | Now (2000) | Forever (2002) |

Singles from Now
- 1. "Now" Released: October 6, 2000; 2. "Feel Your Love" Released: October 6, 2000

Now is the third studio album by South Korean girl group Fin.K.L, released through DSP Media on October 6, 2000. The album spawned two singles that were promoted with live performances on music programs: the title track "Now" and "Feel Your Love".

== Reception ==
The album experienced commercial success in South Korea, where it peaked at number 2 on the monthly MIAK album chart for October 2000 with initial sales of 386,329 copies. The album sold over 412,000 copies by the end of 2000, making it the 19th best-selling album of the year and the fourth best-selling album by a female artist in South Korea during 2000.

== Promotion and live performances ==
On October 8, 2000, Fin.K.L made their comeback stage on SBS's Inkigayo, where they performed "Eternal Love", "Feel Your Love", and "Now". They received their first music show win for "Now" on KBS's Music Bank on November 2. At the 2000 Mnet Music Video Festival, they performed "Eternal Love" and "Now".

== Covers ==
On April 4, 2009, Wonder Girls released a remake of "Now" along with an accompanying music video, which served as a CF for KT Tech's mobile phone brand Ever. Several girl groups have performed covers of "Now" on several South Korean music programs, such as 4Minute, Kara, T-ara, Girls' Generation, Dreamcatcher, Mamamoo, Secret, Twice, Girl's Day, Fromis 9, Rainbow, Sistar, and Fiestar. In 2024, boy group Oneus released a cover of "Now".

== Accolades ==
Fin.K.L won several awards with Now, including Album Bonsang at the annual Golden Disc Awards and Best Female Group at the 2000 Mnet Music Video Festival.

Awards and nominations
| Year | Organization | Category | Result | Ref. |
|---|---|---|---|---|
| 2000 | Golden Disc Awards | Album Bonsang (Main Prize) | Won | |
| 2000 | Golden Disc Awards | Album Daesang (Grand Prize) | Nominated | |
| 2000 | Mnet Music Video Festival | Best Dance Performance (for "Now") | Nominated | |
| 2000 | Mnet Music Video Festival | Best Female Group | Won | |
| 2000 | Seoul Music Awards | Bonsang (Main Prize) | Won | |

Music program awards for "Now"
| Program | Date |
|---|---|
| Music Bank | November 2, 2000 |
| Music Camp | November 18, 2000 |
| Inkigayo | November 12, 2000 |
| Inkigayo | November 19, 2000 |
| Inkigayo | November 26, 2000 |

== Track listing ==
Now track listing
| No. | Title | Lyrics | Music | Arrangement | Length |
|---|---|---|---|---|---|
| 1. | "Now" | Hong Ji-yu | Kim Jin-kwon | Kim Jin-kwon | 3:31 |
| 2. | "Feel Your Love" | Yoo Yoo-jin | Shin In-soo | Kim Seung-hyun | 3:38 |
| 3. | "Eternal Love" | Choi Hee-jin | Shin In-soo | Lee Jeong-gyu | 4:04 |
| 4. | "My Love" | Lee Hee-seung | Ahn Jung-hoon | Ahn Jung-hoon | 4:00 |
| 5. | "Waiting For" (어떤 기다림) | Yang Jae-sun | Ahn Jung-hoon | Ahn Jung-hoon | 3:55 |
| 6. | "One Fine Day" | Kim Young-ah, Kim Sang-dae | Kim Kwon-won | Kim Kwon-won | 3:44 |
| 7. | "Foundation of Love" (연애의 기초) | Kim Young-ah | Park Geun-tae | Park Geun-tae | 3:47 |
| 8. | "First Kiss" (첫키스) | Jeon Jin-hwan | Jeon Jun-gyu | Jeon Jun-gyu | 3:35 |
| 9. | "Pure Love" | Kim Young-ah | Park Hae-moon | Park Hae-un | 3:53 |
| 10. | "I Love School" (나만의 비밀) | Lee Seung-ho, Joe | Jehwanju | Jehwanju | 3:37 |
| 11. | "Sting..." | Cho Eun-chee | Kim Hye-ji | Kim Seung-hyun | 3:47 |
| 12. | "Remember Me" (날 기억해줘요) | Jung Seong-yun | Jung Seong-yun | Bae Hee-kyung | 4:18 |
| 13. | "Dear Man" | Ock Joo-hyun | Hwang Hye-jung | Hwang Hye-jung | 4:05 |
| Total length: | | | | | 49:54 |

== Charts and sales ==
=== Monthly charts ===
| Chart (2000) | Peak position |
|---|---|
| South Korean Albums (MIAK) | 2 |

=== Yearly charts ===
| Chart (2000) | Position |
|---|---|
| South Korean Albums (MIAK) | 19 |

=== Sales ===
| Region | Sales |
|---|---|
| South Korea | 412,686 |
