= Forever (Fin.K.L album) =

Studio album by Fin.K.L
- Released: March 8, 2002
- Recorded: 2001–2002
- Genres: K-pop; R&B
- Length: 1:15:00
- Language: Korean
- Label: DSP Media

Fin.K.L chronology
| Melodies & Memories (2001) | Forever (2002) | Forever Fin.K.L (2005) |

Singles from Forever
- 1. "Forever" Released: March 8, 2002; 2. "Don't Go Away" Released: March 8, 2002

Forever (Korean: 영원; RR: Yeongwon; lit. 'Eternity') is the fourth studio album by South Korean girl group Fin.K.L, released through DSP Media on March 8, 2002. The album spawned two singles that were promoted with live performances on music programs: the title track "Forever" and "Don't Go Away".

== Reception ==
Forever saw commercial success in South Korea upon its release, peaking at number 2 on the monthly MIAK album chart for March 2002 with monthly sales of 252,139 copies. The album sold over 261,000 copies by the end of 2002, ranking as the 19th best-selling album of the year according to MIAK. At the 2002 Mnet Music Video Festival, Fin.K.L received a nomination for Best Female Group with "Forever", but lost to S.E.S.'s "U".

== Accolades ==
Music program awards for "Forever"
| Program | Date |
|---|---|
| Inkigayo | March 31, 2002 |
| Inkigayo | April 7, 2002 |
| Inkigayo | April 14, 2002 |
| Music Camp | April 13, 2002 |

== Tracklist ==
Forever track listing
| No. | Title | Lyrics | Music | Hòa âm | Length |
|---|---|---|---|---|---|
| 1. | "Good Bye" | Ock Joo-hyun | Ryu Eun-mi | Ryu Eun-mi | 3:44 |
| 2. | "Forever" (영원, Eternity) | Lee Hyori | Yoo Jeong-yeon | Yoo Jeong-yeon | 4:19 |
| 3. | "Changer" | Sung Yuri | Hwang Se-jun | Hwang Se-jun | 3:54 |
| 4. | "If You're Like Me" (나와 같다면) | Ock Joo-hyun | Shim Sang-won | Shim Sang-won | 3:46 |
| 5. | "Never" | Yoon Sar-ah | Ahn Jung-hoon | Kim Ji-woong | 3:37 |
| 6. | "Happy" | Kim Young-ah | Jeon Jun-gyu | Jeon Jun-gyu | 3:21 |
| 7. | "Fortune" (For 春) | Cheon Jeong-ah, Ock Joo-hyun | Han Jae-ho, Kim Seung-soo | Han Jae-ho, Kim Seung-soo | 4:15 |
| 8. | "You're My Boy" | Cho Eun-hee | Lee Hyun-seung | Lee Hyun-seung | 3:50 |
| 9. | "Bell" | Kim Young-ah | Ma Kyung-sik | Ko Dong-hoon | 4:03 |
| 10. | "So For Your Love" | Choi Heejin | Sypher Muzik | Sypher Muzik | 4:26 |
| 11. | "I'm Inside of You" (그대 안의 나) | Lee Hyori, Cho Kyu-man | Cho Kyu-man | Jo Hyeon-seok | 4:30 |
| 12. | "The Saddest Thing in the World" (세상에서 가장 슬픈 일) | Jung Seongyun | Jung Seongyun | Baek Heekyung | 5:03 |
| 13. | "Don't Go Away" | Jung Yeon-jun | Jung Yeon-jun | Jung Yeon-jun | 4:05 |
| 14. | "Rejection" (외면) | Lee Jin, Hur In-chang | Lee Hyunseung | Lee Hyunseung | 3:33 |
| 15. | "One More Time" | Kim Taeyoon | Kim Jinhun | Kim Jinhun | 3:52 |
| Total length: | | | | | 60:15 |

== Charts and sales ==
=== Monthly charts ===
| Chart (2002) | Peak position |
|---|---|
| South Korean Albums (MIAK) | 2 |

=== Yearly charts ===
| Chart (2002) | Position |
|---|---|
| South Korean Albums (RIAK) | 19 |

=== Sales ===
| Region | Sales |
|---|---|
| South Korea (RIAK) | 261,518 |
