= StarMax =

StarMax may refer to:

- Motorola StarMax, Apple Macintosh clones
- Starmax, a South Korean DVD distributor
