= White (Fin.K.L album) =

Studio album by Fin.K.L
- Released: May 12, 1999
- Studio: Gwanghwamun Studio (Seoul)
- Genres: K-pop; dance-pop
- Length: 49:48
- Language: Korean
- Label: DSP Media

Fin.K.L chronology
Blue Rain (1998)	White (1999)	Special (1999)

Singles from White
- 1. "Eternal Love" Released: May 12, 1999; 2. "Pride" Released: May 12, 1999

White is the second studio album by South Korean girl group Fin.K.L, released through DSP Media on May 12, 1999. The album spawned two singles that were promoted with music videos and live performances on music programs: "Eternal Love" and "Pride".

== Reception ==
The album was commercially successful in South Korea, where it peaked at number 1 on the monthly MIAK album chart for May 1999 with sales of 472,660 copies. The album sold nearly 594,000 copies by the end of the year. Fin.K.L won several awards with White, including the grand prizes at the Golden Disc Awards, Seoul Music Awards, and SBS Gayo Daejeon.

== Accolades ==
Awards and nominations
Year	Organization	Category	Result	Ref.
1999	Golden Disc Awards	Album Bonsang (Main Prize)	Won	
1999	Golden Disc Awards	Album Daesang (Grand Prize)	Nominated	
1999	SBS Gayo Daejeon	Main Prize (Bonsang)	Won	
1999	SBS Gayo Daejeon	Grand Prize (Daesang) (for "Eternal Love")	Won	

Music program awards
Song	Program	Date
"Eternal Love"	Music Bank	May 25, 1999
"Eternal Love"	Music Bank	June 1, 1999
"Eternal Love"	Inkigayo	June 13, 1999
"Eternal Love"	Inkigayo	June 20, 1999
"Eternal Love"	Inkigayo	June 27, 1999
"Pride"	Inkigayo	August 1, 1999

== Promotion and live performances ==
=== 1999 Fin.K.L First Live Concert ===
Fin.K.L held their first solo concert at the Olympic Fencing Gymnasium in Seoul on August 4, 1999. A live album recording of the concert was released by DSP on October 1, 1999.

Date	City	Country	Venue
August 4, 1999	Seoul	South Korea	Olympic Fencing Gymnasium

== Track listing ==
Vol. 2 White track listing
No.	Title	Lyrics	Music	Arrangement	Length
1.	"Eternal Love" (영원한 사랑; Yeongwonhan Salang)	Kim Young-ah	Joo Tae-young	Jo Seong-jin, Joo Tae-young	4:09
2.	"Waiting For You"	Kim Young-ah	Mario Bolden	Lee Jong-pil	4:11
3.	"The Beginning"	Yoo Yoo-jin	Shin In-soo	Kim Seung-hyun	4:20
4.	"Fairytale in a Drawer" (서랍속의 동화; Seolabsogui Donghwa)	Kim Young-ah	Ma Kyung-sik	Lee Jong-pil	4:15
5.	"Oh! Boy"	Kim Young-ah	Kim Seok-chan	Jeon Jun-kyu	3:59
6.	"I'm Right Now"	Kim Hyeji	Kim Hyeji	Song Bum, Kim Hyeji	3:56
7.	"So We" (그래서 우린; Geulaeseo Ulin)	Ock Joo-hyun	Kim Seok-chan	Jeon Jun-kyu	4:06
8.	"Pride" (자존심; Jajonsim)	Kim Young-ah	Park Hae-Wun	Park Hae-Wun	4:05
9.	"Still in Love"	Lee Hyori	Mario Bolden	Jeon Jun-kyu	4:20
10.	"Kiss Me? Alright!"	Kim Young-ah	Oh Ji-hoon	Oh Ji-hoon	3:47
11.	"Glass" (유리; Yuri)	Lee Jin	Sung Yuri	Sung Yuri, Lee Jong-pil	3:52
12.	"My Prayer" (나의 기도; Naui Gido (Ock Joo-hyun, Lee Hyori duet))	Bae Jeong-eun	Bae Jeong-eun	Bae Jeong-eun	4:47
Total length:					49:48

== Credits and personnel ==
Credits are adapted from the album liner notes.

Fin.K.L.

- Lee Hyori – leader, lead vocal, chorus
- Sung Yu-ri – sub vocal, chorus
- Lee Jin – sub vocal, chorus
- Ock Joo-hyun – main vocal, chorus

Session

- Shin Hyeon-kwon – bass guitar
- Geun-hyung Lee, Sam Lee – guitar
- Kang Yoon-gi – drums
- Jeon Jun-gyu, Bae Jeong-eun – keyboard instrument
- Hyunmin Lee, Sehee Kim, Jiyoung Lee – cello
- Moon Seo-young, Moon Soo-hyung, Eom Se-hee, Lee Hwa-young, Choi Seong-hee, Han Su-hye – violin
- Terrence Stith – rap
- Mario Bolden, Shin In-soo, Kim Hyun-ah, Shin Yuna, Moon Ji-hwan, Kim Seok-chan, Vision Choir, Gloria Choir, Chan and Gong Choir, Park Hae-un – chorus

Staff

- Byeon Seong-bok – producer, recording (Gwanghwamun Studio), mixing
- Seunghwan Lee – string arrangement
- Mario Bolden – chorus arrangement
- Jinho Baek – mixing, recording (Gwanghwamun Studio)
- An Jeong-seon (Gwanghwamun Studio) – recording
- Min Gwang-myeong, Seo Jin-ho – assistive technology
- Sang-hwan Seo, Hyo-young Choi (Sonic Korea) – mastering
- Soohyung Shim – design
- Fair Hall – choreography
- Wootaek Yoon – photography
- Gil Jong-hwa, Shim Byeong-cheol, Yoo Seong-sik – management
- Hoyeon Lee (DSP Media) – executive producer

== Charts and sales ==
=== Monthly charts ===
Chart (1999)	Peak position
South Korean Albums (MIAK)	1

=== Sales ===
Region	Sales
South Korea (MIAK)	593,816
