= Eternal Love (Fin.K.L song) =

Single by Fin.K.L

from the album White
- Language: Korean
- Released: May 13, 1999
- Recorded: 1999
- Genre: K-pop
- Length: 4:09
- Label: DSP
- Songwriter: Kim Young-ah
- Producers: Joo Tae-young; Jo Seong-jin

Fin.K.L singles chronology
"Ruby" (1998)	"Eternal Love" (1999)	"Pride" (1999)

Music video
- "Eternal Love" on YouTube

"Eternal Love" (Korean: 영원한 사랑; RR: Yeongwonhan Salang) is a song recorded by South Korean girl group Fin.K.L for their second studio album, White (1999). It was written by Kim Young-ah, while production and arrangement was handled by Joo Tae-young and Jo Seong-jin. It was made available as part of White on May 13, 1999, serving as the primary single from the album. Upon its release, "Eternal Love" experienced success in South Korea and won various music program awards. This song is a cover of The Carpenters' "For All We Know."

== Background and promotion ==
"Eternal Love" serves as one of the singles off of Fin.K.L's second Korean studio album White, which was released through DSP Media, then known as Daesung Entertainment, on May 13, 1999. The group subsequently began promotions on weekly music programs, where they received their first music show win on Music Bank on May 25. It topped Music Bank for two weeks in a row in addition to three consecutive weeks on Inkigayo.

== Reception and impact ==
In 2014, South Korean music webzine Music Y including the song in their list of 120 Best Dance Songs of All Time, highlighting the popularity of the group member's pure and soft image as it attracted the attention of boys throughout the country. In a 2016 survey conducted by The Dong-a Ilbo involving 2,000 people, "Eternal Love" was voted the sixth best female idol song released in the past 20 years; Fin.K.L additionally ranked second in the vote for favorite female artists in the survey. The song was ranked the 57th greatest K-pop song of all time by Melon and Seoul Shinmun; music critic and Kakao M director Kwon Seok-jeong said that Fin.K.L established the "fairy" concept among K-pop girl groups with "Eternal Love", and that the song, its costumes, and choreography constituted "the perfect trinity". Kwon added that the "fairy" image became the most widely imitated concept among junior girl groups over the next decade before the rise in popularity of "girl crush".

== Awards ==
Awards and nominations
Year	Organization	Award	Result	Ref.
1999	Mnet Video Music Awards	Best Group	Nominated	
1999	KMTV Korean Music Awards	Best Female Group	Won	

Music program awards
Program	Date	Ref.
KBS2's Music Bank	May 25, 1999	
KBS2's Music Bank	June 1, 1999	
SBS's Inkigayo	June 13, 1999	
SBS's Inkigayo	June 20, 1999	
SBS's Inkigayo	June 27, 1999	
