= To My Boyfriend =

Single by Fin.K.L

from the album Blue Rain
- Language: Korean
- Released: May 20, 1998
- Recorded: 1998
- Genre: Bubblegum pop
- Length: 3:57
- Label: DSP
- Songwriter(s): Kim Young-ah
- Producer(s): Kim Seok-chan; Jeon Jun-gyu

Fin.K.L singles chronology
"Blue Rain" (1998)	"To My Boyfriend" (1998)	"Ruby" (1998)

Music video
- "To My Boyfriend" on YouTube

"To My Boyfriend" (Korean: 내 남자친구에게; RR: Nae namja chingu aegae) is a song performed by South Korean girl group Fin.K.L, released on May 20, 1998, as part of the group's debut studio album Blue Rain by DSP Media. Stylistically, "To My Boyfriend" is a summer-themed dance and bubblegum pop song that lyrically resembles that of a love letter written towards the members' romantic interests.

== Background and release ==
"To My Boyfriend"
"To My Boyfriend" is an upbeat summer-themed dance track that lyrically resembles a love letter.

Fin.K.L's debut studio album Blue Rain spawned the singles "Blue Rain", "To My Boyfriend", and "Ruby". The album was met with commercial success in South Korea, where it sold over 231,000 copies by August 1998. The song's accompanying music video was included in the group's compilation DVD album Forever 1998-2005 Music & Story, which was made available on November 18, 2005.

== Reception ==
"To My Boyfriend" was positively received domestically following its release. It became a popular mobile phone ringtone in the years after, particularly around Valentines Day. "To My Boyfriend" was named one of the top 100 K-pop Masterpieces of all time by a panel of 35 Korean music experts in a collaboration with Melon and newspaper Seoul Shinmun in 2021. Critic Lee Kyu-tak contrasted the song's "exciting beats, sweet melody, and cute lyrics" with the group's "calmly toned-down costumes and stages" presented in their debut track "Blue Rain", and said that the concept shown in "To My Boyfriend" perhaps suited the group's image better. Lee added that "The non-exaggerated cute and lively images that Fin.K.L showed in 'To My Boyfriend' had a great influence on later K-pop girl groups", which is why, "along with S.E.S., Fin.K.L are remembered in K-pop history."

== Accolades ==
"To My Boyfriend" achieved the top positions on the programs Inkigayo and Music Bank for two weeks each in September. The song additionally ranked number one on KMTV's cable music program Show! Music Tank for three non-consecutive weeks.

Music program awards
Program	Date
Inkigayo	September 6, 1998
Inkigayo	September 13, 1998
Music Bank	September 22, 1998
Music Bank	September 29, 1998

== Cover performances ==
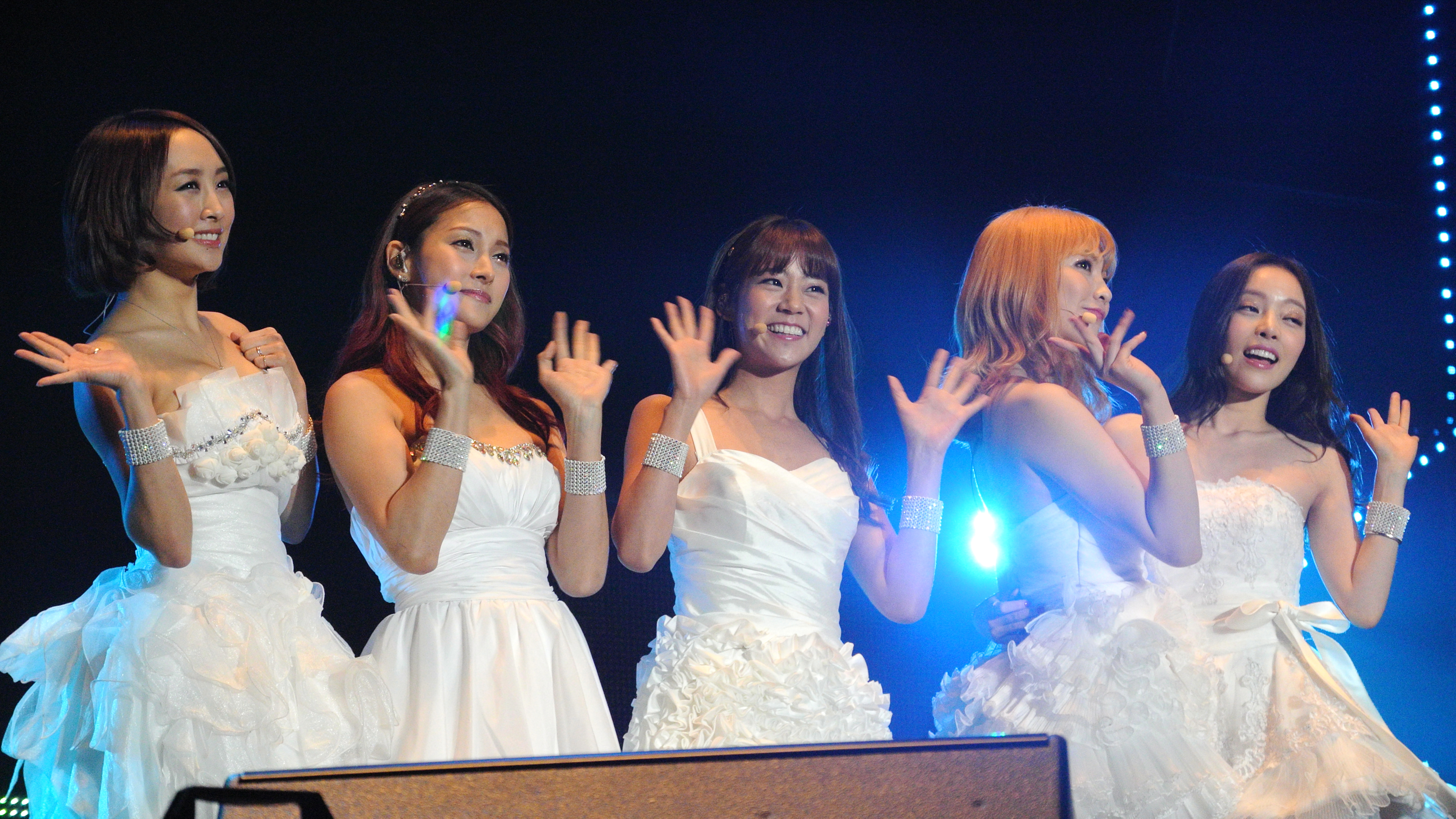
Kara at the 2013 DSP Festival, where they performed "To My Boyfriend" with labelmate Rainbow.

The song has been covered by numerous artists since its release in 1998. Taiwanese singer Yuki Hsu covered the song in her third studio album The Angel (1999), which included multiple covers of South Korean songs. The tracks "I Can’t Cry" and "Call Me" were adaptions of Fin.K.L's "Ruby" and "To My Boyfriend", respectively. Boy group SS501, also managed under DSP, performed a cover of the song at their December 27, 2006 concert at the COEX, where they appeared in similar schoolgirl uniforms Fin.K.L wore for promotions in 1998. Girl groups Wonder Girls and Kara additionally covered the song at the 2007 KBS Song Festival and 2012 MBC Gayo Daejejeon, respectively. On August 8, 2009, T-ara performed the song on SBS's Inkigayo to show off their cute and lively charm through the song.

At the DSP Festival held on December 14, 2013, Kara and Rainbow teamed up and performed a cover of "To My Boyfriend". On music programs, Lovelyz performed it on Music Bank's Christmas Special in 2015 and GFriend performed a special stage on the March 3, 2016 broadcast of M Countdown. At the MBC Gayo Daejejeon at the end of that year, Hani, Seolhyun, and Tzuyu covered the track while sporting pink checkered skirts. Weeekly additionally covered it on M Countdown on July 23, 2020, a month after their debut.
