= Blue Rain (album) =

Studio album by Fin.K.L
- Released: May 20, 1998
- Genres: K-pop; dance-pop
- Length: 42:10
- Language: Korean
- Label: DSP Media

Fin.K.L chronology
Blue Rain (1998)	White (1999)

Singles from Blue Rain
- 1. "Blue Rain" Released: May 20, 1998; 2. "To My Boyfriend" Released: May 20, 1998; 3. "Ruby" Released: May 20, 1998

Blue Rain is the debut studio album by South Korean girl group Fin.K.L, released through DSP Media on May 20, 1998. The album spawned three singles: "Blue Rain", "To My Boyfriend" and "Ruby".

== Background and reception ==
Fin.K.L debuted under DSP Media with the release of their studio album Blue Rain on May 20, 1998. Three singles were spawned from the album, including the title track "Blue Rain", "To My Boyfriend", and "Ruby". According to MIAK, Blue Rain was the 10th best-selling album from March to September 1998, selling over 231,000 copies. It has since sold over 291,000 copies in total.

== Accolades ==
Fin.K.L won the rookie of the year award at the Golden Disc Awards and Main Prize (Bonsang) at the Seoul Music Awards with Blue Rain.

Music program awards
Song	Program	Date
"To My Boyfriend"	Inkigayo	September 6, 1998
"To My Boyfriend"	Inkigayo	September 13, 1998
"To My Boyfriend"	Music Bank	September 22, 1998
"To My Boyfriend"	Music Bank	September 29, 1998
"Ruby"	Music Bank	October 13, 1998
"Ruby"	Music Bank	November 3, 1998
"Ruby"	Music Camp	October 31, 1998
"Ruby"	Inkigayo	November 15, 1998

== Track listing ==
Blue Rain track listing
No.	Title	Lyrics	Music	Arrangement	Length
1.	"Blue Rain"	Lee Seung-ho	Shin In-soo	Jeon Jun-gyu	4:21
2.	"Scent of Love" (사랑의 향기; Salangui Hyanggi)	Lee Seung-ho	Kim Seok-chan	Jeon Jun-gyu	4:11
3.	"Shadow"	Kim Tae-hee		Park Jae-sung	4:07
4.	"Ruby: Sad Tear" (루비: 슬픈눈물; Rubi: Seulpeunnunmul)	Lee Jae-kyung	Choi Jun-young	Choi Jun-young	4:12
5.	"Scribbling" (낙서; Nagseo; lit. 'Doodle')	Ock Joo-hyun	Moon Young-bae	Lee Jong-pil	3:43
6.	"To My Boyfriend" (내 남자 친구에게; Nae Namja Chingu Aegae)	Kim Young-ah	Kim Seok-chan, Jeon Jun-kyu	Kim Seok-chan, Jeon Jun-kyu	3:59
7.	"Temptation" (유혹; Yuhog)	Lee Jae-kyung	Lee Chang-woo	Lee Chang-woo	3:29
8.	"Wink" (윙크; Wingkeu)	Lee Jae-kyung	Shin Jae-hong	Shin Jae-hong	3:25
9.	"Happy Promise" (행복한 약속; Haengboghan Yagsog)	Lee Seung-ho	Ma Kyeong-sik	Lee Jong-pil	3:37
10.	"Go" (가)	Kim Young-ah	Lee Seung-hee, Park Geun-tae	Lee Seung-hee	3:35
11.	"Blue Day" (블루데이; Beulludei (Ock Joo-hyun, Lee Hyori duet))	Lee Jaekyung	Shin Jaehong	Shin Jaehong	3:38
Total length:					42:10

== Charts ==
Chart (1998)	Peak position
South Korean Albums (MIAK)	10

== Sales ==
Region	Sales amount
South Korea	291,905
