= 2000 Mnet Music Video Festival =

- Date: November 24, 2000
- Location: Little Angels Arts Center, Seoul, South Korea
- Hosted by: Cha Tae-hyun and Kim Hyun-joo
- Most awards: Jo Sung-mo (2)
- Most nominations: H.O.T., Jo Sung-mo (3)
- Website: Mnet Asian Music Awards

Television/radio coverage
- Network: South Korea: Mnet; Japan: Mnet Japan
- Runtime: around 160 minutes

The 2000 Mnet Music Video Festival (MMF) was the second of the annual music awards in Seoul, South Korea that took place on November 24, 2000, at the Little Angels Arts Center.

Leading the nominees were boyband H.O.T. and solo artist Jo Sung-mo, with three each. By the end of the ceremony, Jo Sung-mo received the most awards with two wins, including the "Music Video of the Year" daesang award. The boy-band group H.O.T. received only one award, though they received the daesang award for "Best Popular Music Video".

== Background ==
The award-giving body continued to be named as "M.net Korean Music Festival" (MKMF) for the second time. During this time, four more categories were added including the Best R&B Performance. The Best New Artist and Best Group were given to two recipients each since the awards for male and female recipients were separated. In addition, the Best Group branched out further to give a separate award for the Best Mixed Group. Furthermore, the event also featured Westlife, the first international artist to perform live. The grand awards (or daesang) were still the Best Popular Music Video and Music Video of the Year, without the nominees.

== Nomination process ==
The Nominee Selection Committee had an initial screening to choose for the nominees who released songs or albums from November 1999 to October 2000. The official website was then opened on November 2 for voting. In addition, professional judges have also chosen from the nominees based on its criteria: planning, song quality, artistry, and popularity.

== Winners and nominees ==
Winners are listed first and highlighted in boldface.

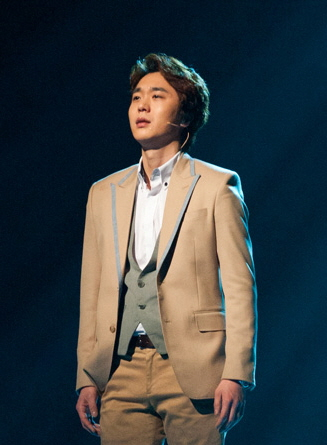
Jo Sungmo, Best Music Video and Best Ballad Performance

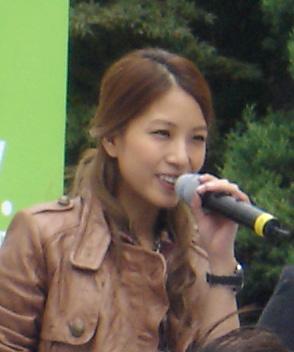
BoA, Best New Female Artist

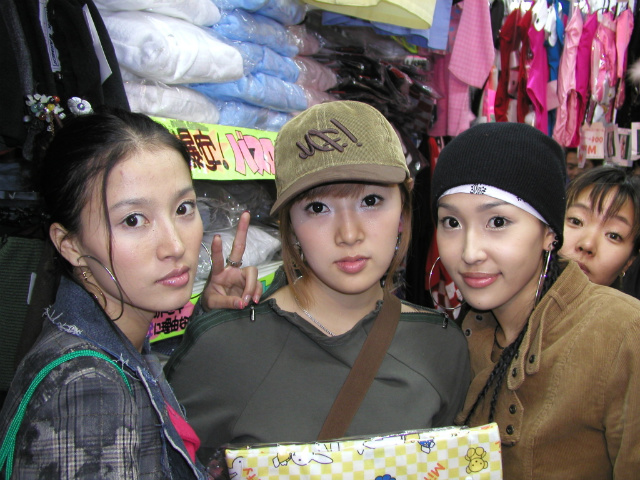
Chakra, Best New Group

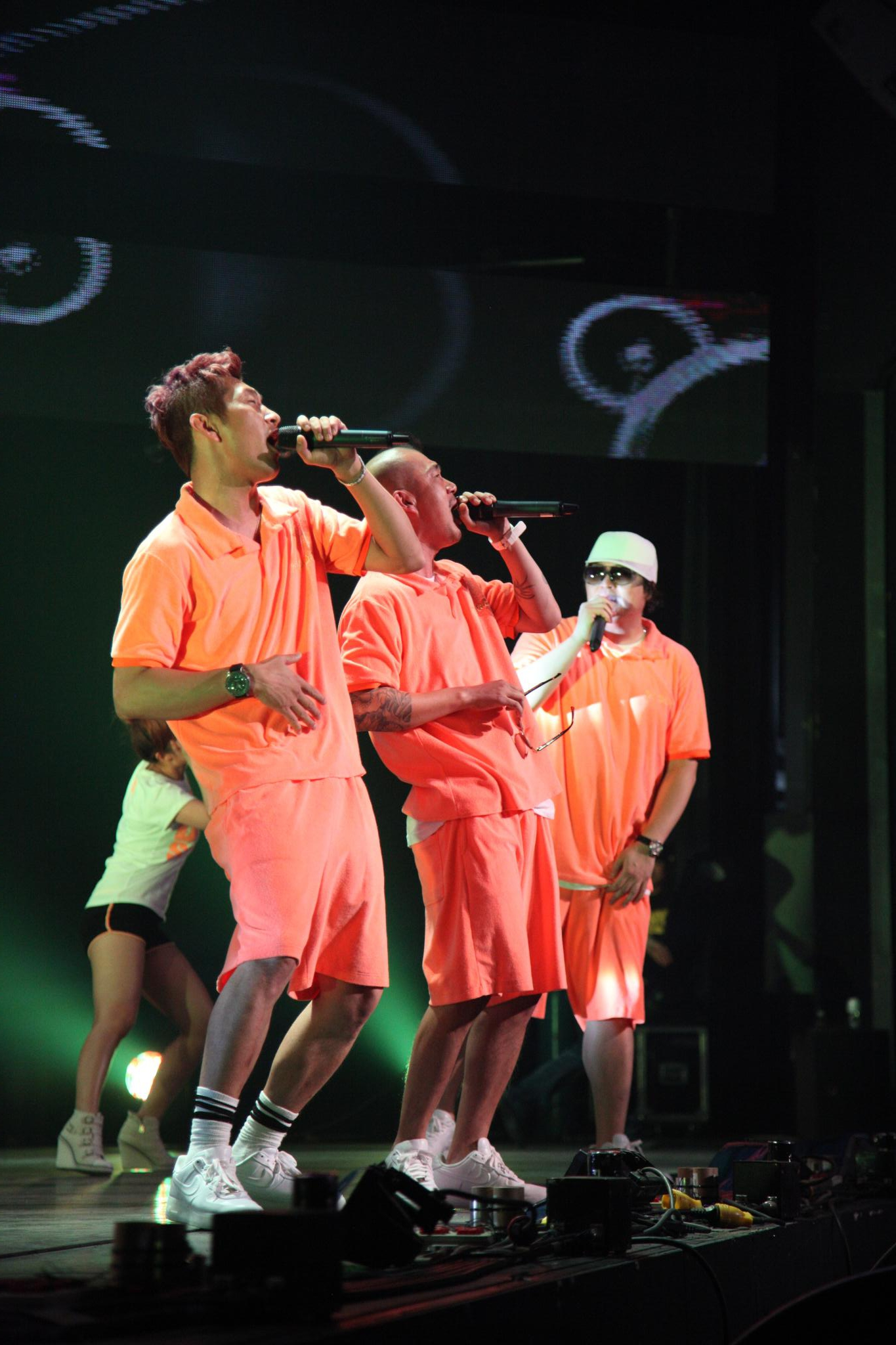
DJ DOC, Best Hip-Hop Performance

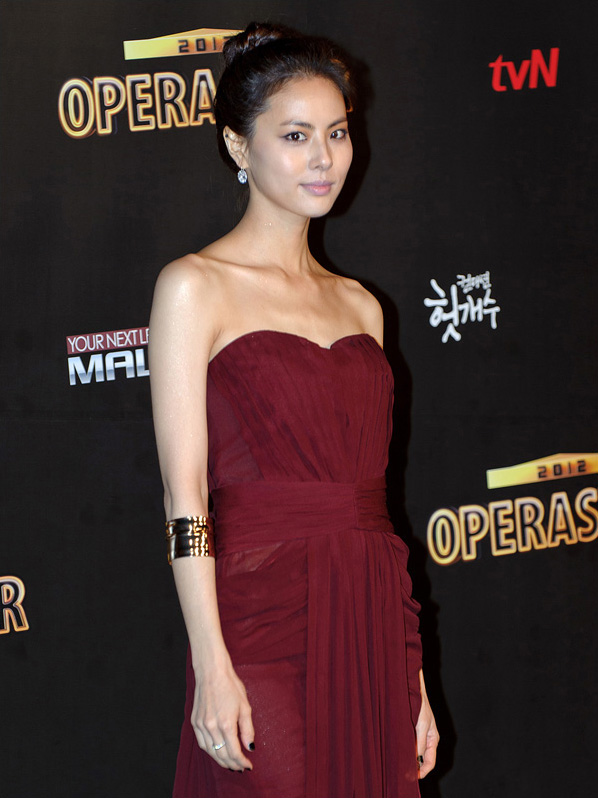
Park Ji-yoon, Best Female Artist

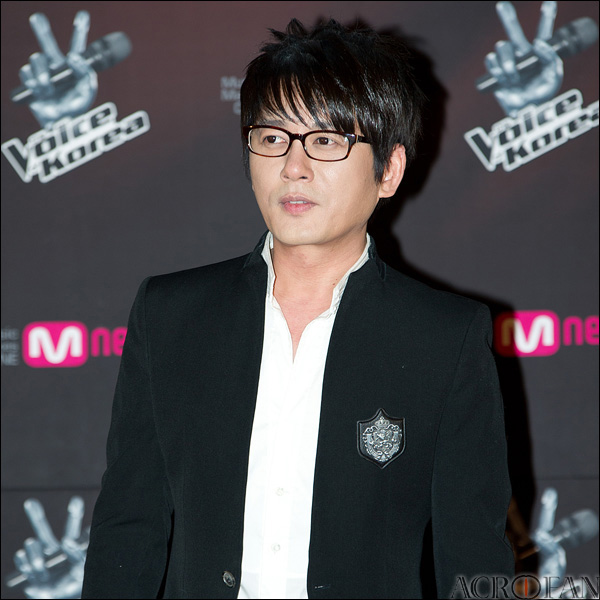
Shin Seung-hun, Best Male Artist

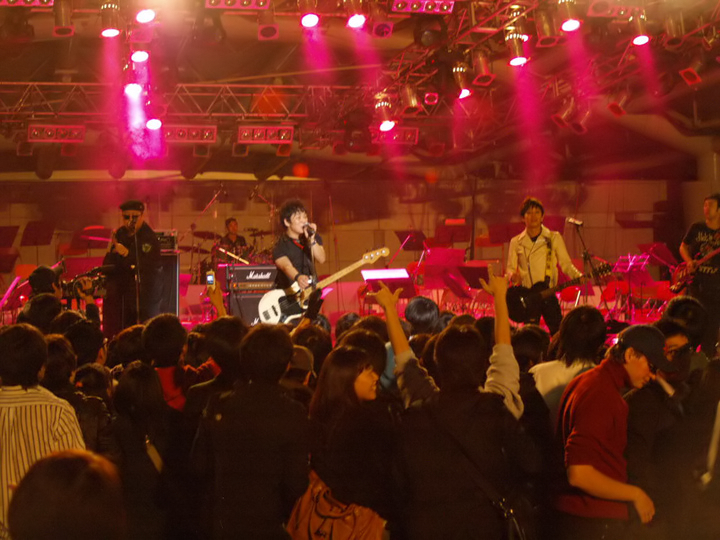
Crying Nut, Best Indie Performance

Best Popular Music Video (daesang)	Music Video of the Year (daesang)
**H.O.T. – "Outside Castle"**	**Jo Sung-mo – "Do You Know"**
Best New Female Artist	Best New Male Artist
**BoA – "ID; Peace B"**; Kim Su-jin – "Ending"; Park Hwayobi – "Lie"; Suzanne – "Shadow"; Chae Na-ri – "Return to The Letter"	**Choi Jin-young / Sky – "Forever"**; Kim Sa-rang – "Mojorida"; Kim Sung-jim – "Commitment"; Park Hyo-shin – "Things I Can't Do For You"; Wave – "Damage"; TJ – "Hey Girl"
Best New Group	Best Mixed Group
**Chakra – "Han (Come A Come)"**; UN – "Voice Mail"; TG – "Love Tonight"; Papaya – "Listen To Me"; Fly to the Sky – "Day By Day"	**S#arp – "Great!"**; Roo'ra – "A Changing Wind's Song"; Space A – "Sexy Guy"; Koyote – "Passion"; Cool – "Understanding Men and Women"
Best Male Group	Best Female Group
**g.o.d – "Love And Memory"**; DJ DOC – "Run To You"; H.O.T. – "Outside Castle"; Clon – "The First Love"; Turbo – "Tonight"	**Fin.K.L – "Now"**; Baby Vox – "Why"; S.E.S. – "Twilight Zone"; 0–24 – "Blind Faith"; Cleo – "Irony"
Best Female Artist	Best Male Artist
**Park Ji-yoon – "Coming of Age Ceremony"**; Kim Hyun-jung – "Are You Really"; Baek Ji-young – "Sad Salsa"; Uhm Jung-hwa – "Cross"; Lee Jung-hyun – "Peace"	**Shin Seung-hun – "The Unwritten Legend"**; Seo Taiji – "Ultramania"; Lee Seung-hwan – "Live A Long Long Time"; Jo Sung-mo – "Do You Know"; Hong Kyung-min – "Shaky Friendship"
Best R&B Performance	Best Rock Performance
**Jinju – "Are You Going?"**; Fly to the Sky – "Day By Day"; As One – "For You Not To Know"; J – "As Yesterday"; g.o.d – "Since You Left Me"	**Seo Taiji – "Ultramania"**; Kim Kyung-ho – "Wine"; Novasonic – "Slam"; Delispice – "News about cats and birds"; Jaurim – "Snake"
Best Hip Hop Performance	Best Indie Performance
**DJ DOC – "DOC Blues"**; 2000 Korea – "Emergency"; 1TYM – "One Love"; Lee Hyun-do – "Pierrot"; Cho PD – "Forget Me 2"	**Crying Nut – "Circus Magic"**; No Brain – "Songs for the Rioters"; Dr. Core 911 – "Rain"; Lazy Bone – "Blue water"; MP Hip-Hop All Stars – "Second"
Best Dance Performance	Best Ballad Performance
**Clon – "The First Love"**; Park Ji-yoon – "Coming of Age Ceremony"; Shinhwa – "Only One"; H.O.T. – "Outside Castle"; Yoo Seung-jun – "Vision"; Fin.K.L – "Now"	**Jo Sung-mo – "Do You Know"**; Shin Seung-hun – "After Separation"; Lee Seung-hwan – "Live A Long Long Time"; Im Chang-jung – "My lover"; Cho Kyu-man – "Give You Everything"
Best Music Video Director
**Kim Se-hun**; Baek Myung-jeon; Seo Hyeon-seung; Cha Eun-taek; Hong Jong-ho

Special awards

- Best International Artist: **Britney Spears – "Oops!... I Did It Again"** (Note: The winner was unannounced during the event, but was acknowledged through MKMF's official website.)
- M.net Japan Viewer's Choice Award: Click-B ("화영문")
- Judges' Choice Award: Tae Jin-ah ("Love Is Not For Someone")

== Multiple awards ==
=== Artist(s) with multiple wins ===
The following artist(s) received two or more wins (excluding the special awards):

Awards	Artist(s)
2	Jo Sung-mo

=== Artist(s) with multiple nominations ===
The following artist(s) received two or more nominations:

Awards	Artist(s)
3	Jo Sung-mo
3	H.O.T.
2
2	Fly to the Sky
2	Lee Seung-hwan
2	Fin.K.L
2	DJ DOC
2	Clon
2	Park Ji-yoon
2	Shin Seung-hun
2	Seo Taiji
2	g.o.d

== Performers and presenters ==
The following individuals and groups, listed in order of appearance, presented awards or performed musical numbers.

=== Performers ===
Name(s)	Performed	Notes
DJ James Jhig, DJ Wreckx, B-Boys	DJ performance	Special Performance 1 – Opening of the show
Ha Hwi-dong (고릴라), 주석, 디기리 (Honey Family), Gaeko (CB Mass), Tiger JK (Drunken Tiger), 리오 (Ill Skillz), 허인상 (X-Teen), Hoony Hoon, 윤힌중, Tyfoon, Lee Ha-neul (DJ DOC), Day 1 (뿜빠이)	Rap medley	Special Performance 1 – Opening of the show
Friends (안무, 지영하, Kim Young-wan)	Dance	Special Performance 1 – Opening of the show
Chakra	"One" (한)	Best New Group winner
Shin Seung-hun	"The Unwritten Legend", "After Separation", and "Mother"	Best Male Artist winner
g.o.d	"Dear Mother", "Love and Memory", and "Lies"	Best Male Group winner
Sobangcha	"G.Cafe (G카페)", "어젯밤 이야기", and "위선"	Special Performance 2
Fin.K.L	"Eternal Love" and "Now"	Best Female Group winner
Uhm Jung-hwa	"Crack", "Escape"	
Westlife	"My Love", "I Lay My Love on You"	First international artist guest/performer
Yoo Seung-jun	"Wish You Could Find"	
Jo Sung-mo	"Do You Know"	Music Video of the Year (daesang)/ Encore

=== Presenters ===
Name(s)	Role
Cha Tae-hyun and Kim Hyun-joo	Main hosts of the show
Kim Sun-a and Kim Jong-un (김정은)	Presenters of the award for Best New Male Artist
Joo Young-hoon and Kwon Min-jung (권민중)	Presenters of the award for Best New Female Artist
g.o.d	Presenters of the award for Best New Group
Jaurim	Presenters of the award for Best Rock Performance
Yeom Kyung-wan (염경환), Lee Je-ni (이제니), Ji Sang-ryeol	Presenters of the award for Best Dance Performance
Han Chae-young and 이경섭	Presenters of the award for Best Ballad Performance
Lee Seung-hwan and Cha Eun-taek (차은택)	Presenters of the award for Best Female Group
Sobangcha	Presenters of the award for Best Male Group
Yang Joon-hyuk and Uhm Jung-hwa	Presenters of the award for Best Mixed Group
Oh Ji-ho and Chae Si-ah	Presenters of the award for Best Hip Hop Performance
Park Yong-jin (박용진) and Kim Sang-kyung	Presenters of the award for Best Indie Performance
Jo Sung-mo and Shin Dong-yup	Presenters of the award for Best R&B Performance
–	Interviewer in the crowd
–	Presenters of the award for Best Male Artist
Shin Seung-hun and –	Presenters of the award for Best Female Artist
Kim Hyung-suk and –	Presenters of the award for Best Music Video Director
