= Diva (South Korean group) =

South Korean hip-hop group

DIVA
- Origin: South Korea
- Genres: K-pop; R&B; hip hop
- Occupation: Singers
- Years active: 1997–2005
- Labels: Cream Records; Zam Entertainment; Kiss Entertainment
- Past members: Vicky; Ji Ni; Lee Min Kyoung; Chae Ri-na

DIVA (Korean: 디바) was a South Korean hip-hop girl group that debuted in 1997 with members Chae Ri-na, Vicky, and Ji Ni. After the release of the group's first two albums, Funky Diva (1997) and Snappy Diva (1998), Ji Ni left the group and was replaced by new member Lee Min Kyoung. After the release of the group's third album Millennium (1999), Chae Ri-na left the group and Ji Ni re-joined. DIVA went on to release the albums Naughty Diva (2000), Perfect (2001), Luxury Diva (2002), Renaissance (2004), and Only Diva (2005) before disbanding in 2005.

== History ==
=== 1997–1999: Debut with Funky Diva, Snappy Diva, Millenium, Dream and line-up changes ===
DIVA debuted with their first album titled Funky Diva in 1997 and their singles there was Yeah and Drama of December. Their single "Yeah (그래)" was popular in Korea peaking at number 5 at music charts. Their album sold about 270,000 copies.

DIVA released their second album titled Snappy Diva in the summer of 1998 with singles titled "Why (왜 불러)" and "Joy (기쁨)" Their single Why (do you call me)? was very popular, peaking at number 1 at music charts and was later remade by the girl group C.I.V.A, in 2016. Their single Joy was also popular. Their second album sold over 240,000 copies.

In early 1999 they released their English Album titled Dream in Taiwan with the single I'll Get Your Love and was popular in Taiwan selling over 30,000 copies. However, after their promotions in Taiwan, Ji Ni left and Lee Min Kyoung was added. On July 8th 1999, DIVA released their third album titled Millenium with singles "Yo Yo (고리)" and "Feel It". Their single Yo Yo peaked at number 3 in music charts and was also popular. Their third album sold over 100,000 copies.

=== 2000–2002: Naughty Diva, Perfect! and Luxury Diva ===
DIVA released their fourth album titled Naughty Diva in 2000, with the singles "Up & Down" and "In This Winter (이 겨울에)". DIVA still remained popular even though popular member and leader Chae Rina left the group. Their album sold 112,788 copies., they followed their single "Crazy" on music shows as their promotional single.

DIVA released their fifth album titled Perfect! in 2001 with singles "Perfect! (딱이야)" and "DVD". Perfect! peaked at #6 in music charts. The album sold 69,069+ copies in 2001.

DIVA released their sixth album, a feat achieved by few girl groups in Korea, titled Luxury Diva which saw DIVA change their styles with luxurious and dark concepts. Their singles where Lust in the Wind and Action. Their album was less popular than their last 5 albums with Action peaking only at number 14 in music charts. The album sold about 46,840 copies.

=== 2003–2005: Best, Renaissance, Only Diva and disbandment ===
DIVA released their first compilation album in 2003 titled Best compiling their popular singles during their active times in Korea from 1997 to 2002. The album sold about 20,000 copies.

DIVA released their seventh album titled Renaissance with singles Hey Boy and Amoremio. Their single Hey Boy peaked at number 11 and their seventh album sold about 17,797 copies.

DIVA released their eighth and final album before disbandment titled Only Diva with singles Smile and My Style. Their music video for Smile was filmed in China. This album sold 20,000 copies in Korea. After their promotions, DIVA announced their disbandment to focus on solo activities.

== Discography ==
=== Studio albums ===
Title	Album details	Peak chart positions	Sales
Title	Album details	KOR	Sales
Funky Diva	Released: August 29, 1997; Label: Woongjin Music; Format: CD, cassette	No data	No data
Snappy Diva	Released: April 22, 1998; Label: Cream Records; Format: CD, cassette	No data	KOR: 231,032
Millennium	Released: July 8, 1999; Label: Cream Records; Format: CD, cassette	3	KOR: 153,864
Naughty Diva	Released: November 8, 2000; Label: Cream Records; Format: CD, cassette	7	KOR: 112,788
Perfect! (딱이야!)	Released: August 16, 2001; Label: Universal Music Korea, Jam Entertainment; Format: CD, cassette	12	KOR: 69,069
Luxury Diva	Released: September 1, 2002; Label: BMG Korea, Jam Entertainment, Kiss Entertainment; Format: CD, cassette	46*	KOR: 46,840
Renaissance	Released: January 26, 2004; Label: BMG Korea, C&C Media, BM Entertainment; Format: CD, cassette	31	KOR: 6,330
Only Diva	Released: August 26, 2005; Label: EMI Korea, IO Music, C&C Media, BM Entertainment; Format: CD, cassette	27	KOR: 4,241
* September 2002 data is not available. The peak chart position for Luxury Diva is from October 2002.

=== English albums ===
- Dream (1999)

=== Compilation albums ===
- Best World (2003)

== Awards and nominations ==
Year	Award	Category	Nominated work	Result	Ref.
1997	Golden Disc Awards	Popularity Award	"Yeah" (그래)	Won	
2001	Mnet Asian Music Awards	Best Female Group	"Perfect!"	Nominated	
2004	Mnet Asian Music Awards	Best Female Group Video	"Hey Boy"	Nominated	
2005	Mnet Asian Music Awards	Best Female Group	"Smile" (웃어요)	Nominated	
