= Fin.K.L =

South Korean girl group

- Left to right: Sung Yu-ri, Ock Joo-hyun, Lee Jin, Lee Hyori

Background information
- Origin: South Korea
- Genres: K-pop; R&B
- Years active: 1998–2002; 2005; 2019; 2026–present
- Labels: DSP; Gemstone E&M
- Members: Lee Hyori; Ock Joo-hyun; Lee Jin; Sung Yu-ri
- Website: Finkl.dspenter.com (archived on July 11, 2006)

Fin.K.L (Korean: 핑클) is a South Korean girl group formed by DSP Media in 1998 consisting of members Lee Hyori, Ock Joo-hyun, Lee Jin, and Sung Yu-ri. Fin.K.L was one of the most popular K-pop groups of the late 1990s and early 2000s, alongside rival girl group S.E.S. The group cemented their popularity in South Korea with the release the songs "To My Boyfriend" in 1998, "Eternal Love" in 1999, and "Now" in 2000.

The group released four full-length albums: Blue Rain (1998), White (1999), Now (2000), and Forever (2002). They won several major awards including New Artist of the Year at the 1998 Golden Disc Awards, the Grand Prize at the 1999 Seoul Music Awards, and Best Female Group at the 2000 Mnet Music Video Festival.

Fin.K.L became inactive after releasing the single, "FinKL", in 2005. However, Fin.K.L reunited on a variety show in July 2019 and released Fin.K.L Best Album, including a new song titled "Just Like the Song That Remains" on September 22.

On September 21, 2026, Gemstone E&M announced that four members will have decided to resume activities as Fin.KL after 21 years.

== Name ==
Their name stands for Fin Killing Liberty, and was intended to mean that the group stood against "the oppression of all freedom" (fin means "end" in Spanish and French). The group's name was selected by a poll of young people by the record company before the group's inception. This is the reason for the lack of clear meaning in Fin.K.L's English name, for the Korean name was selected first.

== History ==
=== 1998: Formation and debut ===
The first member to be discovered for Fin.K.L was its main vocalist, Ock Joo-hyun. She was discovered through a radio singing contest, which she won by singing Mariah Carey's 1993 hit "Hero". Ock told her friend Lee Jin about this group and encouraged her to join; Lee was selected after singing Eco's "Blessed Me" (Korean: 행복한 나를) for her audition. The next member to be selected was Sung Yu-ri, who was discovered while on a school field trip. As for the fourth member, Annie Lee (who formed Tashannie with Yoon Mi-rae) was accepted, but decided to depart after a few months. Lee Hyori, who was found while in a mall taking sticker pictures with friends, was brought into the group.

Fin.K.L debuted in 1998 with its first album Blue Rain. The trend of late 1990s K-pop was to have groups sing cute, catchy music, as evidenced by the success of SM Entertainment groups S.E.S. and H.O.T. In contrast, Fin.K.L's initial strength was in R&B ballads led by Ock's vocals; this was shown by their first single "Blue Rain". Fin.K.L's next hit "To My Boyfriend" (Korean: 내 남자친구에게) was a more typical pop song and followed popular conventions at the time. (Yuki Hsu, a Taiwanese singer, sang a remake version of "To My Boyfriend" not long after the song's success in South Korea.) They capped off their first album activities with a third single, "Ruby" (Korean: 루비), which was a ballad about a lost love, and giving that love up for the good of everyone involved. The group also created a music video for a fourth single called “Shadow” (which was eventually just left as a video and not promoted).

=== 1999: White and S.P.E.C.I.A.L ===
Fin.K.L released a follow-up album on May 13, 1999, with White. Two hit songs from this album were "Eternal Love" (Korean: 영원한 사랑) and "Pride (Korean: 자존심). Their second album had less of a focus on ballads, although the slow R&B song "Waiting for You" was performed occasionally. Also, Fin.K.L began limiting their music videos to one or two per album; a video was never made for "Waiting for You". Like their first, this album was very successful, selling almost 700,000 copies.

The group released a "decimalized" or "half" album (which usually signifies either a limited or special release, such as a cover album or a themed record). Their first "half" album was released on November 24, 1999, and their two most famous songs from this album were "To My Prince" (Korean: 나의 왕자님께), a ballad, and "White" (Korean: 화이트), a seasonal pop song. S.P.E.C.I.A.L also contained a remake version of "Like an Indian Doll" (Korean: 인디언 인형처럼), a popular song sung by Na-mi (나미) in 1989. No music videos were made in support of the album's release. The album sold in excess of 340,000 copies.

Because of its release date, Fin.K.L created a "winter" theme for their performances and dressed in wintry outfits to promote "White". To complete the theme, they often had fake snow falling during their "White" performances; however, this created a problem in that the snow was quite slippery, causing members and back-up dancers to slip and even occasionally fall. Due to the limited release of the album, Fin.K.L has a shorter promotion schedule. However, both of these 1999 albums helped Fin.K.L win a daesang (Korean for 'grand prize') at the end of the year.

=== 2000–2001: Now and Melodies & Memories ===
Fin.K.L's third album Now, released on October 6, 2000, emphasized the physical maturity of Fin.K.L members. Unlike the previous catchy tunes and cute outfits, Fin.K.L members were dressed in semi-formal attire for performances for the hit single "Now" (the album's title song). "Feel Your Love", their follow-up single, had their members in school uniforms that signified transformation to womanhood. Only "Now" was promoted with a music video and a busy performance schedule; the second single was relatively ignored. The album sold over 400,000 copies.

The group released their second "half" album on April 13, 2001, 6 months after their last album. Melodies & Memories was a special album consisting of remakes of Korean hits from the 80s and 90s. Instead of targeting their main fanbase of teenage listeners, this album appealed to adults in their 20s and 30s by arousing nostalgia. Singles from this album include Lee Ye-rin's "Always Like This Moment" (Korean: 늘 지금처럼), and Hye Eun-yi's 1981 single "You Wouldn't Know" (Korean: 당신은 모르실 거야). Like their third album, Memories & Melodies only had one music video promoting the album (the one for "You Wouldn't Know"). However, much effort went into this video, as it recreated scenes from four popular movies for each of the members, including scenes from Pretty Woman. Sales at the end of 2001 totaled 259,259 copies.

In 2000, they also recorded "True Love" for a South Korean drama, All About Eve.

=== 2002: Forever ===
Their last studio album so far was released in the spring of 2002. The first single, "Forever" (Korean: 영원), is a pop ballad about waiting forever for a lost love. This was accompanied by a video depicting four tragic stories mainly about the loss of innocence: Sung portrays a masseuse, Ock a sick florist, Lee Jin a frustrated artist who eventually kills herself, and Lee Hyori as a boxer who loses a finger. This song became very popular, although it was not as heavily promoted as their other lead singles. Their second single, "Don't Go Away", was chosen by the fans via the group's website, because it was felt that Fin.K.L had not had an upbeat single for a while. However, this single was promoted for a short time before being abruptly dropped. By the end of 2002, the album sold 261,518 copies.

=== 2003–2006: Solo activities, "FinKL" and disbandment ===
Fin.K.L decided to go their separate ways, although not officially breaking up. Lee Hyori and Ock have since released solo albums, while Lee Jin and Sung have acted in dramas and hosted various shows. At the end of 2005, the group made a comeback and released "FinKL", a digital single that had 4 songs (including the title track) and a music video. However, due to lack of promotion (as the group did not perform on the various music shows), the single failed to chart. Instead of ignoring the single, though, they have since released a special Fin.K.L Forever set that had two DVDs (one with their music videos and the other with various performances) and a photobook that also had the "FinKL" single in CD form.

They have continued to work in the entertainment industry and stay in the public eye. Sung has continued acting, starting with the drama Bad Girls (Korean: 나쁜 여자들) and receiving positive attention in 2003 for Thousand Years of Love (Korean: 천년지애). Sung also played the lead roles in the dramas My Platoon Leader (Korean: 막상막하) and First Love of a Royal Prince (Korean: 황태자의 첫사랑). She was also in the drama series, One Fine Day (Korean: 어느 멋진 날) and The Snow Queen (Korean: 눈의 여왕), she received high praise and won awards for both performances in 2006. Sung also starred as Heo Yi-nok in the drama Hong Gil-dong (Korean: 쾌도 홍길동) co-starring Kang Ji-hwan and won a Best Couple award. Lee Jin has also worked in television, hosting various shows and even joining a popular comedy show for a season. Both Sung and Lee Jin won "Best Actress" in their respective categories (drama and comedy) at the end-of-year awards in 2002. Lee Jin has also debuted in the South Korean film industry and has tried to distance herself from her Fin.K.L image.

After her solo album "Nan..." in 2003, due to significant weight loss, Ock became very popular in 2004. She debuted as a musical actress in 2005 in "Aida", and after initial struggles has since went on to become one of the highest profile musical actresses in Korea with ticketing power rivaling her male counterparts, having starred in the Korean-language adaptations of Rebecca, Elisabeth, The Count of Monte Cristo, Wicked, Sweeney Todd, Chicago, original musical Mata Hari, and many more. Her third and last studio album, Remind, came out in 2007, she has since released OSTs and independent ballads. Lee Hyori, though, has been the standout solo member, releasing her first solo album in 2003 which catapulted her to the top of the charts and won her many advertising contracts. However, she encountered controversy on her second album's lead song "Get Ya!", because it had elements that were very similar to Britney Spears's "Do Somethin'". Although she moved on to her second single "Shall We Dance?", promotional activities were quickly stopped. Her 2007 single "Toc Toc Toc", released in March 2007, reached #1 on the Music Industry Association of South Korea's monthly charts.

By the fall of 2006, all the members of Fin.K.L had left DSP Entertainment and signed on with different companies. Although there was continued speculation on the status of the group, Fin.K.L never officially disbanded.

=== 2008–2019: Reunions and Camping Club ===
Fin.K.L reunited and performed together on December 19, 2008, during a concert by Lee Hyori. In September 2010, Ock became the host of the KBS Cool FM music program Gayo Plaza (가요광장). Her program began airing on September 20, 2010, and her first guests were Lee Hyori, Lee Jin, and Sung as members of Fin.K.L.

In May 2019, a Fin.K.L reunion variety show was announced to air on JTBC. The television series, Camping Club, featured the Fin.K.L members reuniting and traveling around the country; the show premiered on July 14. On September 22, 2019, the group released a single, "Just Like the Song That Remains" (남아있는 노래처럼), marking their first release since 2005.

=== 2026–present: Resumption of group activities ===
On September 21, 2026, Gemstone E&M announced that the members will resume full-group activities under their own name for the first time in 21 years. The agency added that it will not be a one-off reunion, but a new beginning as a group. On November 18, the group opened their official social media and shared the new profile photos.

== Discography ==
=== Studio albums ===
Title	Album details	Peak chart positions	Sales
Title	Album details	KOR RIAK	Sales
Blue Rain	Released: May 20, 1998; Label: DSP Media; Formats: CD, cassette	—	KOR: 291,905
White	Released: May 12, 1999; Label: DSP Media; Formats: CD, cassette	1	KOR: 593,816
Now	Released: October 6, 2000; Label: DSP Media; Formats: CD, cassette	2	KOR: 412,686
Forever	Released: March 8, 2002; Label: DSP Media; Formats: CD, cassette	2	KOR: 261,518

==== Special albums ====
Title	Album details	Peak chart positions	Sales
Title	Album details	KOR RIAK	Sales
Special	Released: November 24, 1999; Label: DSP Media; Formats: CD, cassette; Track listings: 1. "To My Prince" (나의 왕자님께); 2. "Time of Mask" (가면의 시간); 3. "White" (화이트); 4. "Blind Love"; 5. "Without You" (기도); 6. "Rose" (로즈); 7. "To My Friend" (숨겨진 그림자); 8. "Just a Little Bit" (아주 잠시만); 9. "Addiction" (중독); 10. "Tonight"; 11. "Your Memories" (너의 기억); 12. "Maybe"; 13. "Like an Indian Doll" (인디언 인형처럼)	2	KOR: 346,646
Melodies & Memories	Released: April 13, 2001; Label: DSP Media; Formats: CD, cassette; Track listings: 1. "Behind You" (너의 뒤에서); 2. "Always Like This Moment" (늘 지금처럼); 3. "You Wouldn't Know" (당신은 모르실 거야); 4. "Eyes" (눈동자); 5. "Jealousy" (질투); 6. "If You Give Your Heart for Me" (너의 마음을 내게 준다면); 7. "One More Time" (한 번만 더); 8. "Something Nostalgic" (어떤 그리움); 9. "Scent in Time" (시간 속의 향기); 10. "Looks" (보이네); 11. "Love Is Like Fragile Glass" (사랑은 유리 같은 것); 12. "Though You're Laughing Like a Doll" (그대는 인형처럼 웃고 있지만)	2	KOR: 252,127

=== Compilation albums ===
Title	Album details	Peak chart positions
Title	Album details	KOR
Fin.K.L Best Album	Released: August 18, 2019; Label: DSP Media; Formats: CD, digital download; Track listings: 1. "Blue Rain"; 2. "To My Boyfriend" (내 남자친구에게); 3. "Waiting for You"; 4. "Eternal Love" (영원한 사랑); 5. "Ruby" (루비(淚悲):(슬픈 눈물)); 6. "White" (화이트); 7. "Now"; 8. "Pride" (자존심); 9. "Forever" (영원); 10. "I In You" (그대안의 나)	31

=== Video albums ===
Title	Album details
1999 Fin.K.L First Live Concert	Released: October 1, 1999; Label: DSP Media; Formats: CD, VCD; Track listings: 1. Opening / "Eternal Love" (영원한 사랑); 2. "Waiting For You"; 3. "Oh! Boy"; 4. "The Magic Castle" (마법의 성); 5. "My Prayer" (나의 기도); 6. "Ruby" (루비); 7. "Shadow"; 8. "Go" (가); 9. Opening Part.2 / "Blue Rain" (블루레인); 10. "Scent Of Love" (사랑의 향기); 11. "Still In Love"; 12. "Glass" (유리 ) 13. "Fairytale in the Drawer" (서랍 속의 동화); 14. "Kiss Me? Alright!"; 15. "Pride" (자존심 ) 16. "The Beginning"; 17. "To My Boyfriend" (내 남자친구에게)
2000 Fin.K.L Second Live Concert	Released: May 31, 2000; Label: DSP Media; Formats: CD, VCD

=== Single albums ===
Title	Album details
Forever Fin.K.L	Released: October 26, 2005; Label: DSP Media; Formats: CD, digital download; Track listing: 1. "Butterfly"; 2. "Fin.K.L"; 3. "I'm Crazy About You"

=== Singles ===
Title	Year	Peak chart positions	Album
Title	Year	KOR	Album
"Blue Rain"	1998	—	Blue Rain
"To My Boyfriend" (내 남자친구에게)	1998	—	Blue Rain
"Ruby" (루비)	1998	—	Blue Rain
"Eternal Love" (영원한 사랑)	1999	—	White
"Pride" (자존심)	1999	—	White
"To My Prince" (나의 왕자님께)	1999	—	Special
"White" (화이트)	1999	—	Special
"Now"	2000	—	Now
"Feel This Love"	2000	—	Now
"Always Like This Moment"	2001	—	Melodies & Memories
"You Wouldn't Know"	2001	—	Melodies & Memories
"Forever" (영원)	2002	—	Forever
"Don't Go Away"	2002	—	Forever
"FinKL"	2005	—	Forever Fin.K.L
"Just Like the Song That Remains" (남아있는 노래처럼)	2019	60	Non-album single
Chart positions were not available for singles prior to 2010.

== Awards and nominations ==
Year presented, name of the award ceremony, award category, nominated work and the result of the nomination
Award	Year	Category	Nominated work	Result	Ref.
Golden Disc Awards	1998	Rookie of the Year Award	Blue Rain	Won	
Golden Disc Awards	1999	Main Prize (Album Bonsang)	White	Won	
Golden Disc Awards	1999	Grand Prize (Album Daesang)	White	Nominated	
Golden Disc Awards	2000	Main Prize (Album Bonsang)	Now	Won	
Golden Disc Awards	2000	Grand Prize (Album Daesang)	Now	Nominated	
KBS Music Awards	1998	Best Singer Award (Bonsang)	Fin.K.L	Won	
KBS Music Awards	1999	Best Singer Award (Bonsang)	Fin.K.L	Won	
KBS Music Awards	2000	Best Singer Award (Bonsang)	Fin.K.L	Won	
KBS Music Awards	2001	Best Singer Award (Bonsang)	Fin.K.L	Won	
KMTV Korean Music Awards	1998	Best New Artist (Group)	Fin.K.L	Won	
KMTV Korean Music Awards	1998	Popular Singer Award	Fin.K.L	Won	
KMTV Korean Music Awards	1999	Best Female Group	"Eternal Love"	Won	
KMTV Korean Music Awards	2000	Main Prize (Bonsang)	Fin.K.L	Won	
KMTV Korean Music Awards	2001	Main Prize (Bonsang)	Fin.K.L	Won	
MAMA Awards	1999	Best Group	"Eternal Love"	Nominated	
MAMA Awards	2000	Best Female Group	"Now"	Won	
MAMA Awards	2000	Best Dance Performance	"Now"	Nominated	
MAMA Awards	2001	Best Female Group	"You Will Never Know"	Nominated	
MAMA Awards	2002	Best Female Group	"Forever"	Nominated	
MAMA Awards	2005	Best Female Group	"FinKL"	Nominated	
MBC Top 10 Singers Song Festival	1998	Popular Singer Award (Bonsang)	Fin.K.L	Won	
MBC Top 10 Singers Song Festival	1999	Popular Singer Award (Bonsang)	Fin.K.L	Won	
MBC Top 10 Singers Song Festival	2000	Popular Singer Award (Bonsang)	Fin.K.L	Won	
MBC Top 10 Singers Song Festival	2001	Popular Singer Award (Bonsang)	Fin.K.L	Won	
SBS Gayo Daejeon	1998	Main Prize (Bonsang)	Fin.K.L	Won	
SBS Gayo Daejeon	1999	Grand Prize (Daesang)	Fin.K.L	Won	
SBS Gayo Daejeon	1999	Main Prize (Bonsang)	Fin.K.L	Won	
SBS Gayo Daejeon	2000	Main Prize (Bonsang)	Fin.K.L	Won	
SBS Gayo Daejeon	2001	Most Popular Award	Fin.K.L	Won	
Seoul Music Awards	1998	Main Award (Bonsang)	Blue Rain	Won	
Seoul Music Awards	1999	Grand Award (Daesang)	White	Won	
Seoul Music Awards	1999	Main Award (Bonsang)	White	Won	
Seoul Music Awards	2000	Main Award (Bonsang)	Now	Won	

== See also ==
- List of best-selling girl groups
- Fin.K.L at IMDb
