= Lee Jin =

South Korean actress (born 1980)

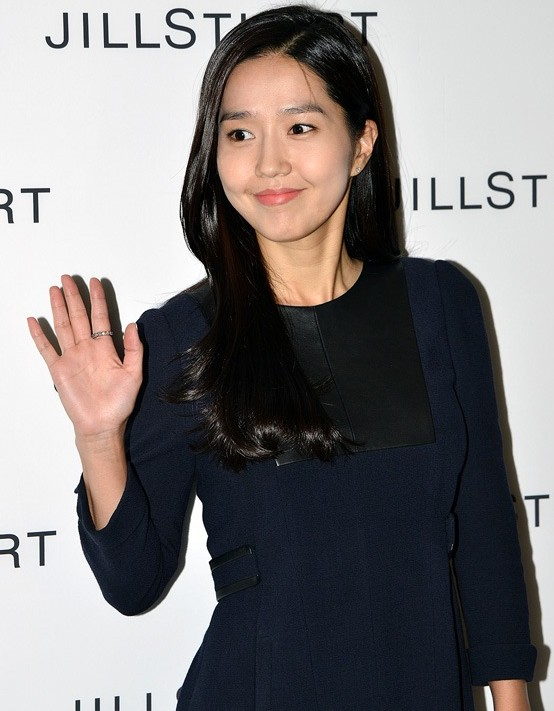
- Lee in 2012
- Born: March 21, 1980 (age 46); Seoul, South Korea
- Education: Kyonggi University
- Occupations: Singer, actress
- Years active: 1998–present
- Agent: King Kong by Starship
- Spouse: Unknown (m. 2016)
- Musical career
- Genre: K-Pop
- Instruments: Vocal
- Years active: 1998–2002 • 2019–present
- Label: DSP Media
- Member of: Fin.K.L

Korean name
- Hangul: 이진
- Hanja: 李眞
- RR: I Jin
- MR: I Chin

Lee Jin (Korean: 이진; born March 21, 1980) is a South Korean singer and actress. She made her entertainment debut as a member of the K-pop girl group Fin.K.L, along with Lee Hyori, Ock Joo-hyun, and Sung Yu-ri. After Fin.K.L came to an unofficial end in 2002, Lee became an actress.

== Career ==
Lee Jin joined Fin.K.L after her friend Ock Joo-hyun—the first member to be selected for the group—introduced her to the casting director selecting the group's members. She sang Eco's "Heng Bok Han Na Reul" and was immediately selected to be in the group.

In 2002, the members from the girl group started solo activities. Lee had long expressed her interest in acting, before her debut she was in MBC's Police People. Subsequently, she starred in the popular sitcom Nonstop.

In 2005, Lee joined the variety program X-Man. On the show, Lee signalled that she had grown into a "lady" from her Fin.K.L teenage days via a change in her hairstyle and clothes. In X-Man, she became known for her stiff dance steps, so she had to create new stiff dance steps for the intro dance segment in each episode. She was also known for being the show's ulzzang ("best/pretty face"), having been chosen by many of the male guests to be their partner in the couple game.

In 2010, Lee also appeared in Heroes where 12 artists competed in games to garner the popular title or will fall into the unpopular group. In this program, she showed her nice and warm-hearted personality.

== Filmography ==
=== Television dramas ===
- Nonstop 3 (MBC, 2002–2003)
- Banjun Drama (MBC, 2005) (with Andy of Shinhwa)
- Best Theater "Accident Prone Area" (MBC, 2006)
- Her Cerebral Hemorrhage Story (MBC, 2006)
- The King and I (SBS, 2007–2008)
- New Wise Mother, Good Wife (MBC, 2007, cameo)
- Hometown of Legends "Returning Lady" (KBS2, 2008)
- Soul (MBC, 2009)
- Jejungwon (SBS, 2010)
- Glory Jane (KBS2, 2011)
- The Great Seer (SBS, 2012)
- The Secret of Birth (SBS, 2013)
- Shining Romance (MBC, 2013–2014)
- Immutable Law of First Love (Naver TV Cast, 2015)

=== Film ===
- Too Fragile to Be Loved (2009)

=== Variety shows ===
- Beauty Center (SBS, 2002–2003)
- Declaration of Freedom! Today is Saturday – A Good Transportation Day (KBS, 2003)
- Show! Power Video (KBS, 2003–2005)
- X-Man (SBS, 2005)
- Millionaire's Bag (ETN, 2008)
- Heroes (SBS, 2010)
- Camping Club (JTBC, 2019)

== Video game appearance ==
Lee is a playable character in the video game Tony Hawk's Pro Skater 2 (only in the South Korean PC version).

== Personal life ==
Lee got married in Hawaii on February 20, 2016.
