= MAMA Award for Best Female Group =

Award presented by CJ E&M Pictures (Mnet)

- Awarded for: Best female group of the year
- Country: South Korea
- Presented by: CJ E&M Pictures (Mnet)
- First award: 2000
- Currently held by: Aespa (2025)

Highlights
- Most awards: Twice (4)
- Most nominations: Twice (10)
- Website: Mnet Asian Music Awards

The MAMA Award for Best Female Group (여자 그룹상) is an award presented annually by CJ E&M Pictures (Mnet). It was first awarded at the 2nd Mnet Asian Music Awards ceremony held in 2000, although two female groups were included in the nominees for the Best Male Group in 1999; the band Fin.K.L won the award for their song "Now", and it is given in honor for the female group with the most artistic achievement in the music industry.

== Winners and nominees ==
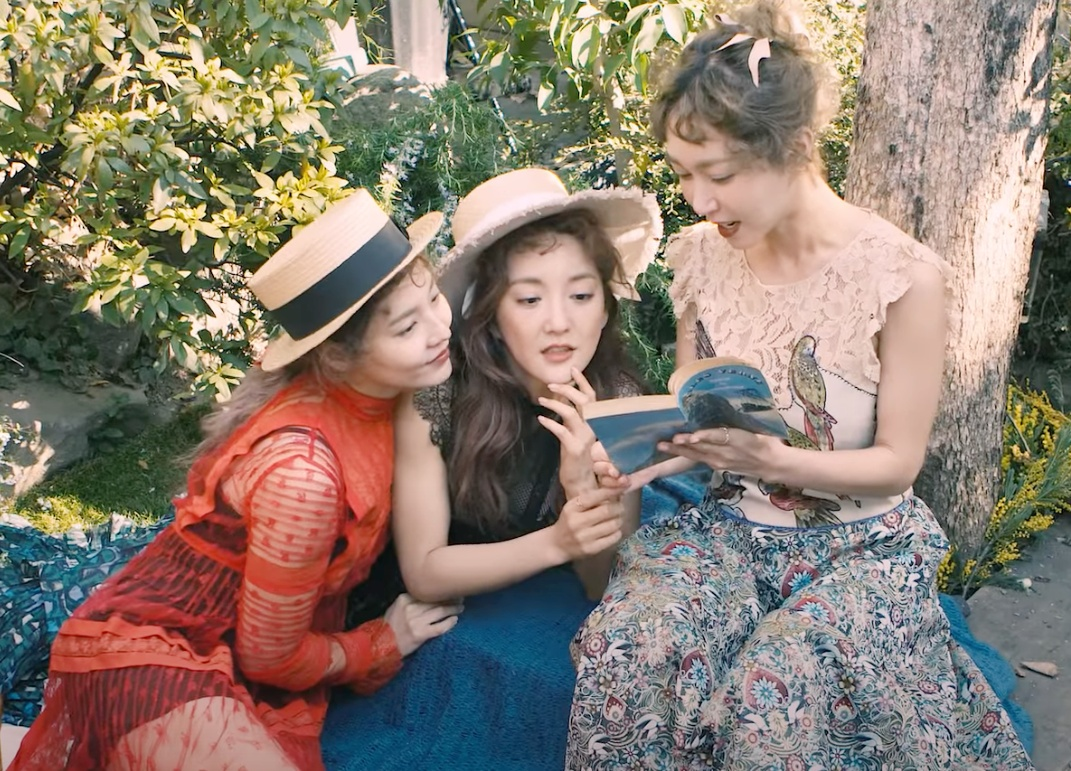
S.E.S (2001–02)

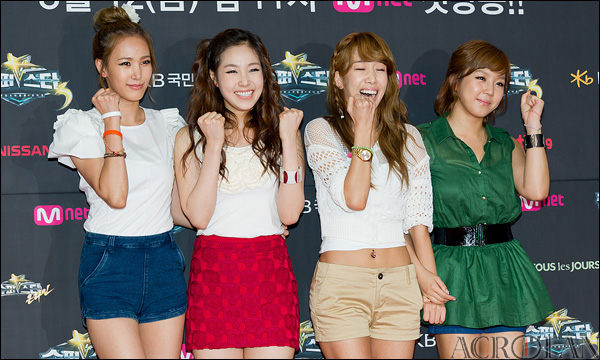
Jewelry (2003, 2005)

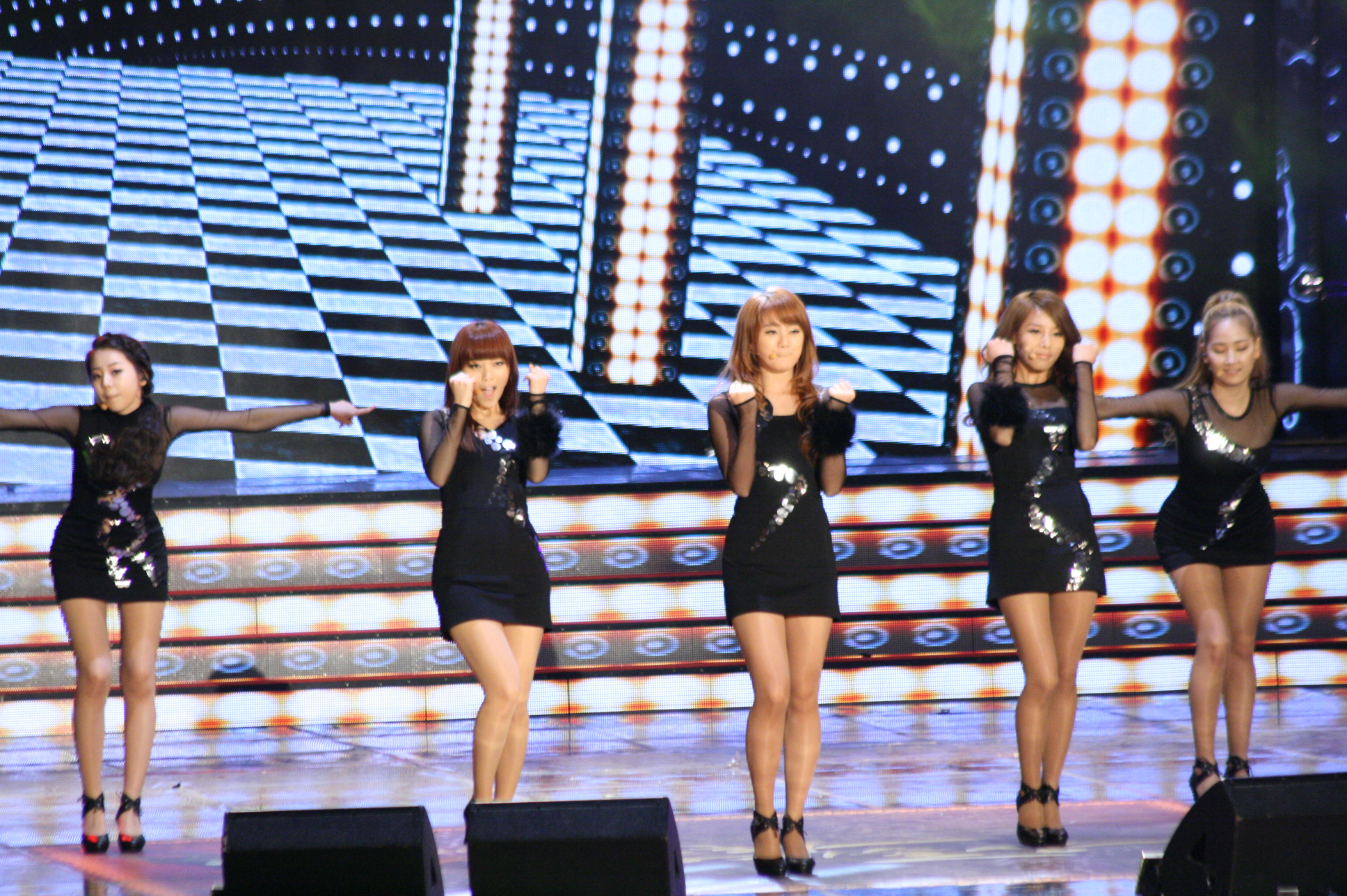
Wonder Girls (2008)

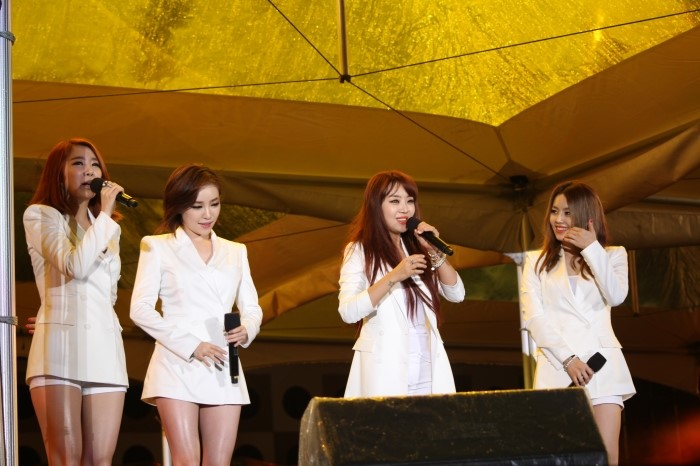
Brown Eyed Girls (2009)

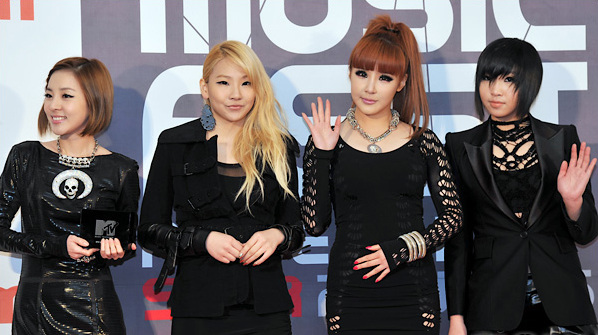
2NE1 (2010)

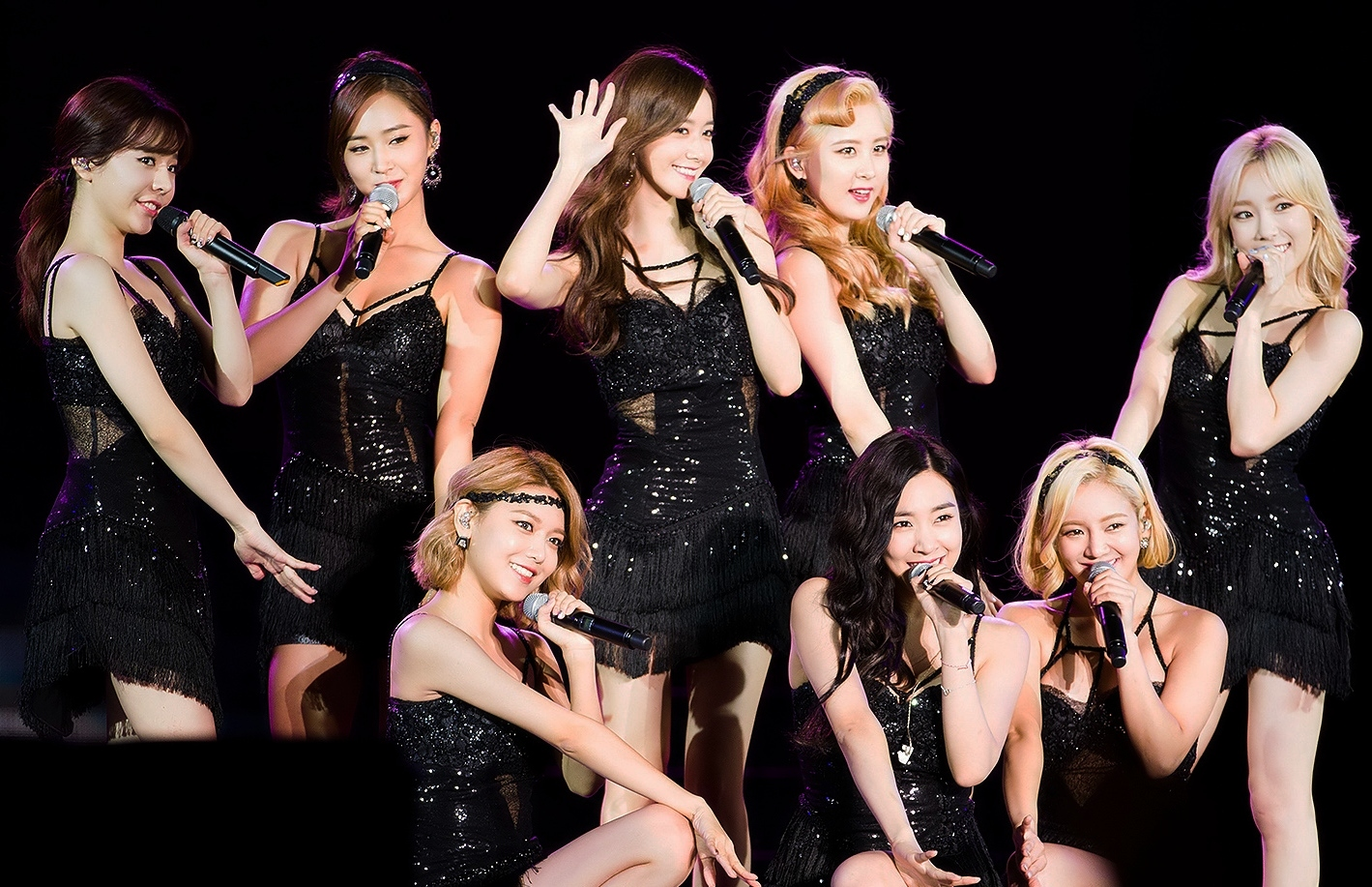
Girls' Generation (2011, 2013, 2015)

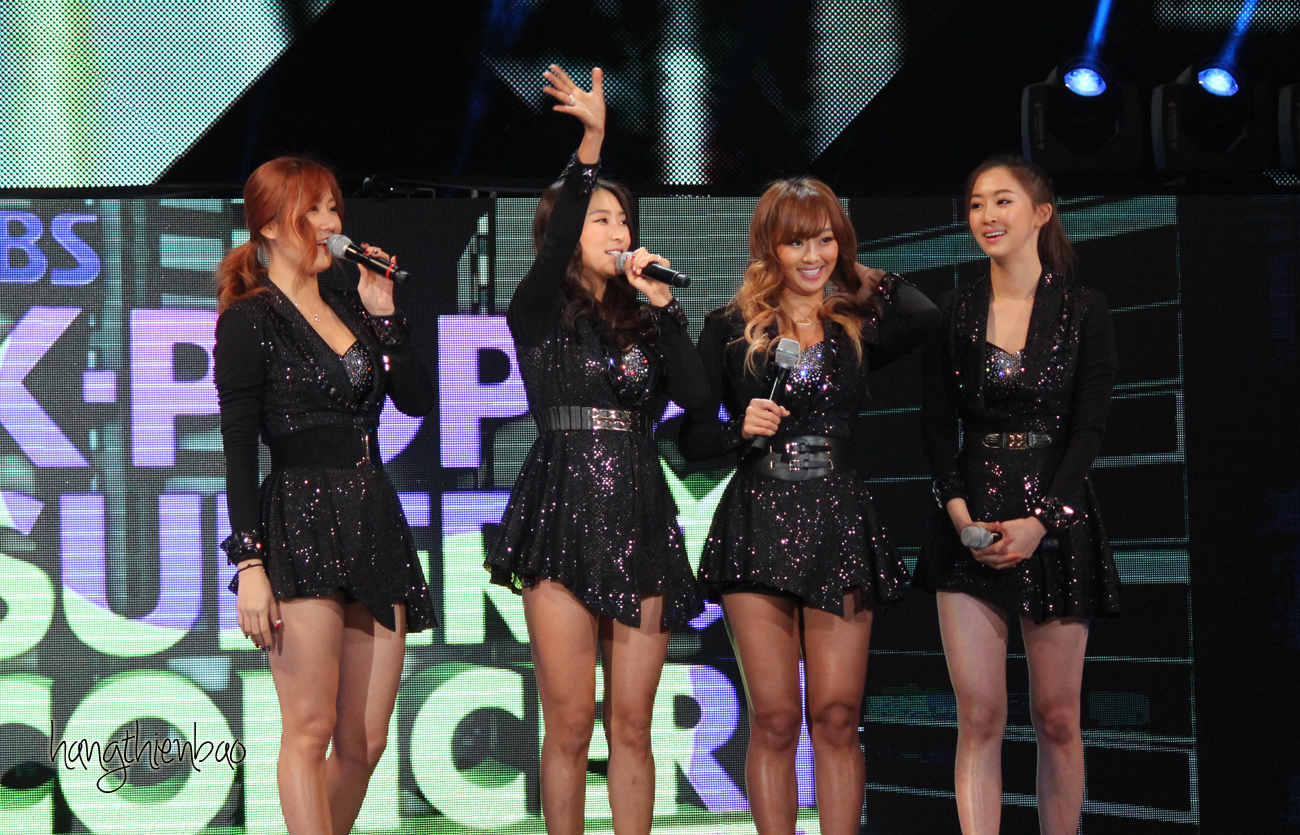
Sistar (2012, 2014)

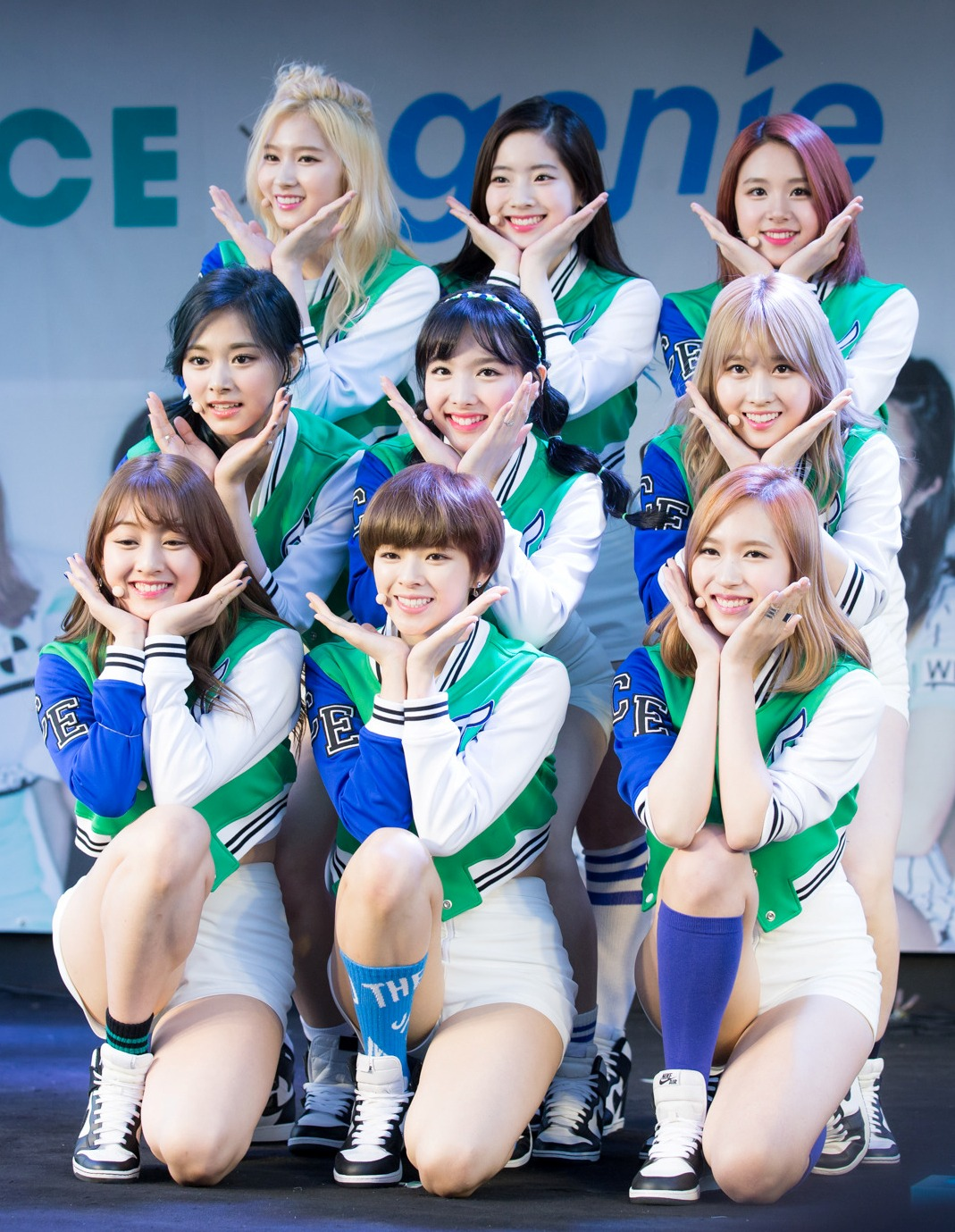
Twice (2016, 2018–19, 2021)

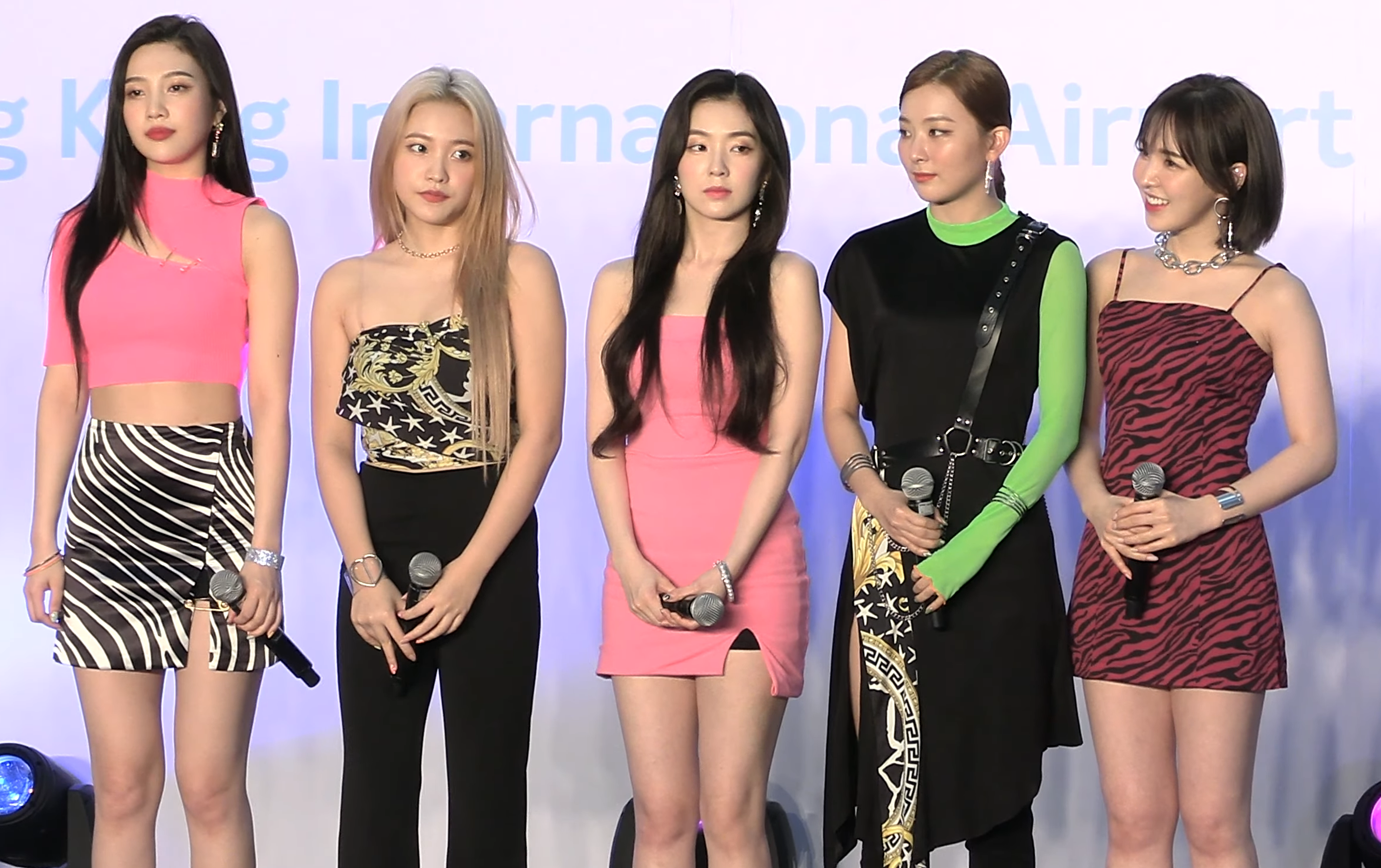
Red Velvet (2017)

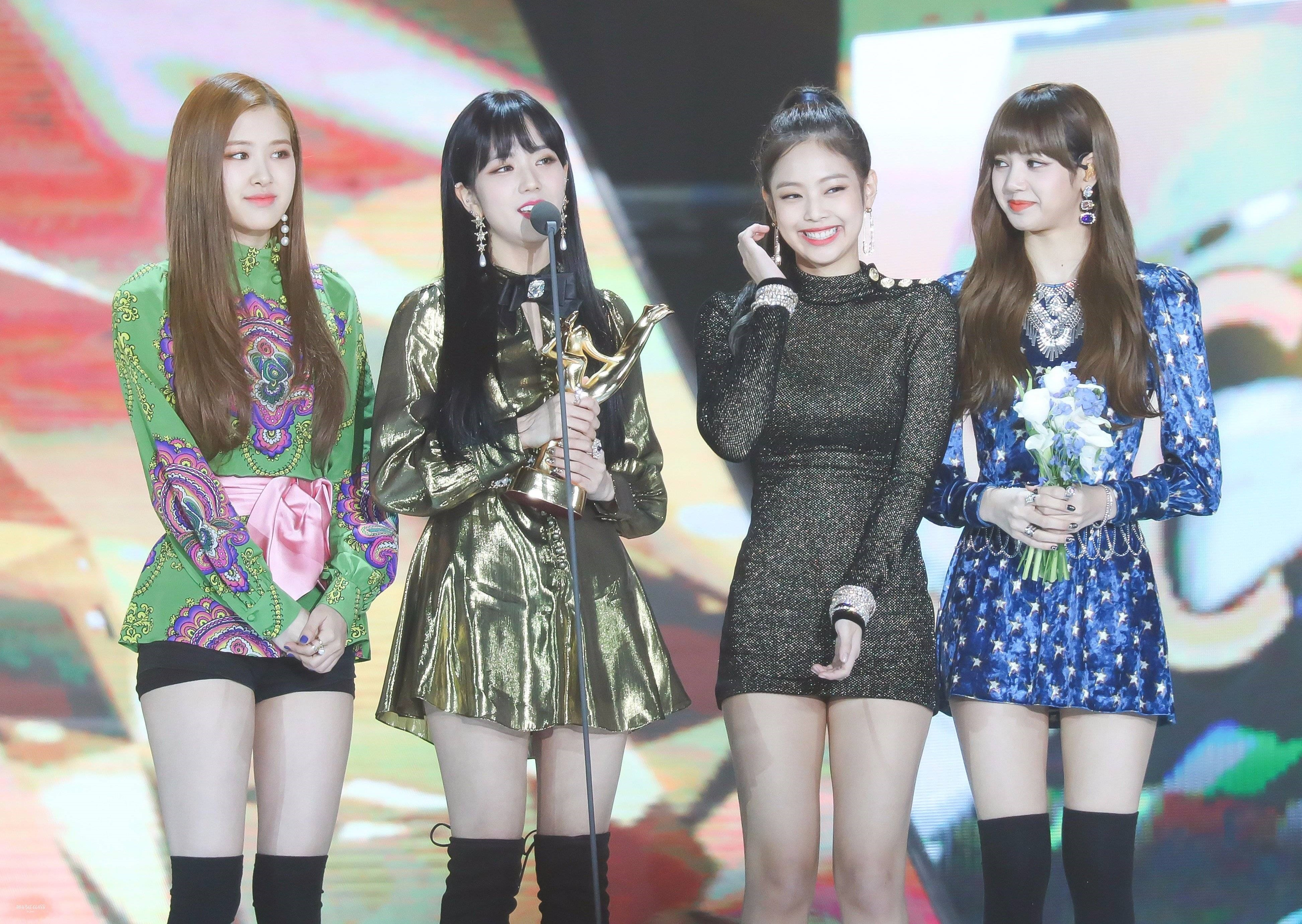
Blackpink (2020, 2022)

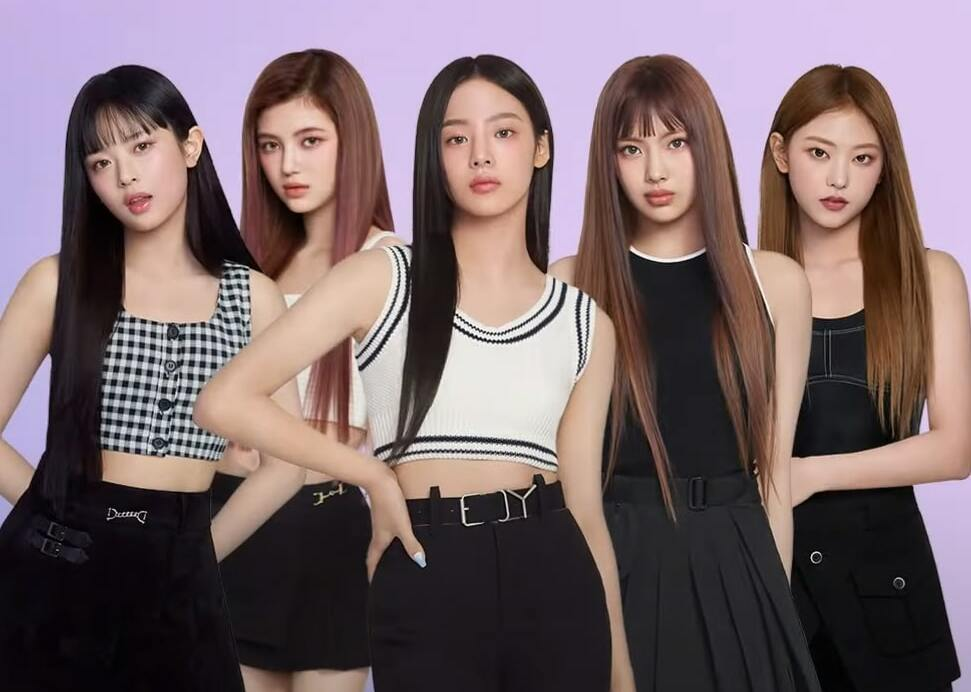
NewJeans (2023)

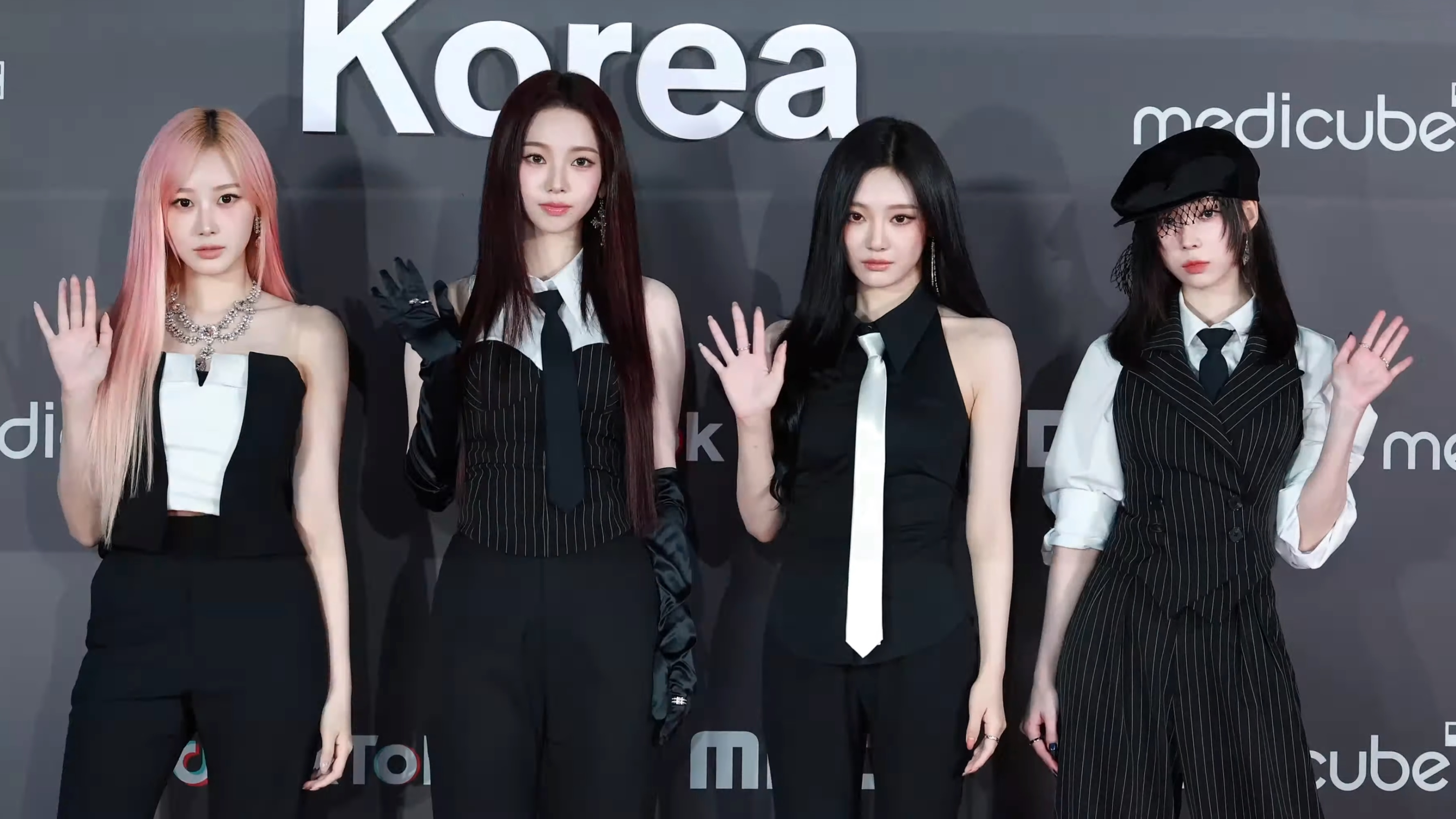
Aespa (2024-25)

=== 2000s ===
| Year | Winner | Work | Nominees |
|---|---|---|---|
| 2000 | Fin.K.L | "Now" | O-24 – "Blind Faith"; Baby Vox – "Why"; Cleo – "Irony" (모순); S.E.S. – "Twilight Zone" |
| 2001 | S.E.S. | "Just In Love" (꿈을 모아서) | As One – "I'm Fine" (천만에요); Baby Vox – "Game Over"; Diva – "Perfect!"; Fin.K.L – "You Will Never Know" (당신은 모르실거야) |
| 2002 | S.E.S. | "U" | Baby Vox – "Coincidence" (우연); Chakra – "Forever" (영원); Fin.K.L – "Come Back" (돌아와); Jewelry – "Again" |
| 2003 | Jewelry | "I Really Like You" (니가 참 좋아) | As One – "Mr.A-Jo"; Baby Vox – "What Should I Do" (나 어떡해); Chakra – "To You" (난 너에게); Sugar – "Shine" |
| 2004 | Sugar (Note: Titled "Best Female Group Video" award.) | "Secret" | Baby Vox – "Xcstasy"; Cleo – "In & Out"; Diva – "Hey Boy" |
| 2005 | Jewelry | "Super Star" | Big Mama – "Women" (여자); Diva – "Smile" (웃어요); Fin.K.L – "Fin.K.L" (핑클); Sugar – "Wise Farewell" |
| 2006 | None (Note: It was titled as "Best Group", and all nominees (including the winning group) were male groups.) | | |
| 2007 | SeeYa | "Love Greeting" | Big Mama – "Betrayal"; Brown Eyed Girls – "Oasis"; LPG – "The Princess Of The Sea"; The Grace – "One More Time Ok?" |
| 2008 | Wonder Girls | "Nobody" | Brown Eyed Girls – "L.O.V.E"; Girls' Generation – "Kissing You"; Jewelry – "One More Time"; SeeYa – "Hot Girl" |
| 2009 | Brown Eyed Girls | —N/a | Davichi; Girls' Generation; Jewelry; Kara |

=== 2010s ===
| Year | Winner | Nominees |
|---|---|---|
| 2010 | 2NE1 | 4Minute; Girls' Generation; Kara; T-ara |
| 2011 | Girls' Generation | 2NE1; Brown Eyed Girls; f(x); Kara |
| 2012 | Sistar | 2NE1; Girls' Generation-TTS; Kara; T-ara |
| 2013 | Girls' Generation | 2NE1; 4Minute; f(x); Sistar |
| 2014 | Sistar | 2NE1; Apink; Girl's Day; Girls' Generation |
| 2015 | Girls' Generation | AOA; Apink; Miss A; Sistar; Wonder Girls |
| 2016 | Twice | GFriend; Mamamoo; Red Velvet; Wonder Girls |
| 2017 | Red Velvet | Blackpink; GFriend; Mamamoo; Twice |
| 2018 | Twice | Blackpink; GFriend; Mamamoo; Momoland; Red Velvet |
| 2019 | Twice | Blackpink; GFriend; Iz*One; Mamamoo; Red Velvet |

=== 2020s ===
| Year | Winner | Nominees |
|---|---|---|
| 2020 | Blackpink | Iz*One; Mamamoo; Oh My Girl; Red Velvet; Twice |
| 2021 | Twice | (G)I-dle; Brave Girls; Itzy; Oh My Girl; Red Velvet |
| 2022 | Blackpink | (G)I-dle; Aespa; Itzy; Red Velvet; Twice |
| 2023 | NewJeans | (G)I-dle; Aespa; Ive; Le Sserafim; Twice |
| 2024 | Aespa | (G)I-dle; Ive; Le Sserafim; NewJeans; Twice |
| 2025 | Aespa | Babymonster; I-dle; Ive; Le Sserafim; Twice |

== Multiple awards ==
4 wins

- Twice

3 wins

- Girls' Generation

2 wins

- Sistar
- Jewelry
- S.E.S.
- Blackpink
- Aespa

== See also ==
- List of music awards honoring women
