= Starmax =

South Korean DVD distributor

Starmax is a South Korean DVD distributor specifically for the Korean market; their films are often encoded for Region 3 and the extras typically do not feature English-language subtitles. Variety called them "one of the biggest video distribution companies in [South Korea]." They were spun off of Samsung in 1984, and they were purchased by The Omega Group, a Japanese company, in 1999. They announced a merger with Gaonix in 2002.
