= Kim Hyun-joong discography =

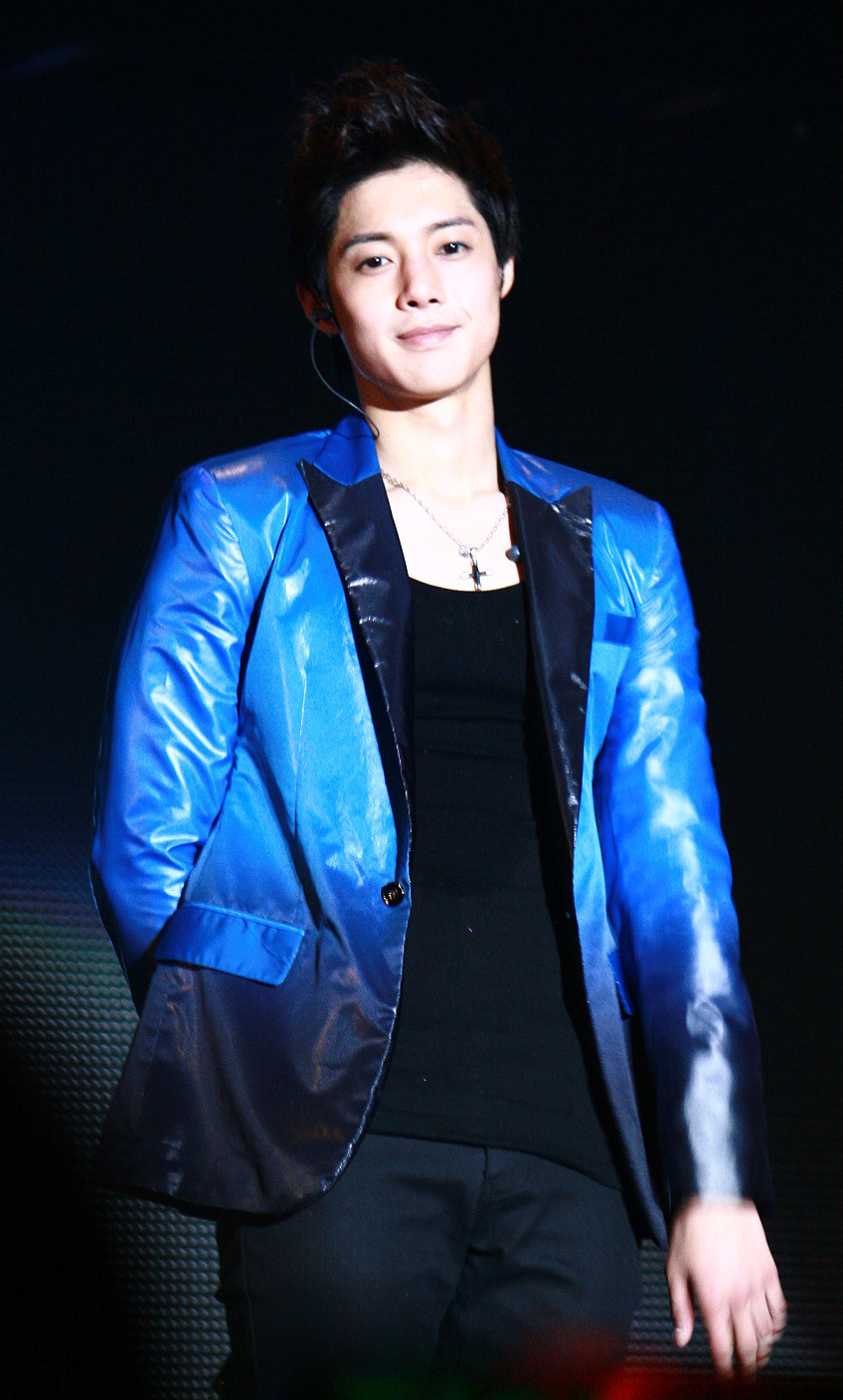
- Kim Hyun-joong during SS501 concert in Hong Kong, 2009
- Studio albums: 6
- EPs: 5
- Soundtrack albums: 7
- Singles: 14
- Video albums: 10
- Music videos: 28

During 2005–2010, Kim has had two solo songs from SS501 albums: "Rize Up" from Kokoro, and "Please Be Nice to Me" from SS501 Solo Collection. In 2008, he released "Thank You" digital single, a theme song from We Got Married and was also included in SS501 mini album Find. In 2009, he contributed two soundtracks from Boys Over Flowers including the acoustic version of "Because I'm Stupid"" and "A Thing Called Happiness". He, then released a DVD entitled Goodbye Yoon Ji-hoo, marking the end of his character role in Boys Over Flowers, and coming back as the leader of SS501. In 2010, he contributed "One More Time" from his drama Playful Kiss.

On June 7, 2011, Kim released his solo debut mini album, Break Down, exceeding 70,000 pre-ordered copies in just 10 days. It peaked at number one on Gaon Weekly Album Chart and was the best-selling album for June on Gaon Monthly Album Chart with 100,433 copies sold. It also topped the Japanese Oricon chart in the International Imported Album category and was a certified platinum in Taiwan, due to which Warner Music Taiwan CEO Chen Ze Shan handed Kim a platinum record in a press conference held in Taiwan. "Break Down" was the first-place winner for two consecutive weeks on Mnet's M Countdown music show as well as on KBS's Music Bank. His second mini album Lucky debuted at number 5 on Billboard's World Chart and topped the Gaon Chart again, garnering the highest selling album on the Hanteo Album Sales Chart for the month of October.

On January 25, 2012, Kim released his first Japanese single "Kiss Kiss / Lucky Guy", which consists of Japanese versions of songs from his two Korean mini albums and one original Japanese song. Both singles reached the highest record in a day for any overseas artist in Japan. Two weeks after its release, the single reached its Gold status in Japan for selling 121,547 copies. His First Impact Concert DVD sold 16,000 copies in its first week of release, taking the number one spot for the Overall DVD Chart. This is the first time a Korean artist has taken the number one spot, and a second time a foreign artist has taken the number one spot on the charts. Two months after the DVD release, Kim released his second Japanese single "Heat" on July 4. The single took over Japan Oricon's Daily and Weekly Charts, with 140,000 copies sold on its first day and a total of 183,000 copies for its first week. The album also placed third for Oricon singles monthly chart for the month of July, selling 196,850 copies and beating DBSK's Android album with 171,554 copies. Ultimately, Kim received a Gold certificate again for his "Heat" single. His first full length Japanese album entitled Unlimited topped the Oricon Daily Album Charts, and both the Tower Records' Weekly Album Charts for Shibuya branch and overall Weekly Album Chart upon its release. The album has been certified Gold by the Recording Industry Association of Japan (RIAJ) after selling more than 100,000 units to retailers.

His third Japanese single "Tonight" topped the Oricon Daily charts with 101,818 copies sold, and taking the number two spot by the end of the week. The album received Gold certificate for selling more than one million copies on June. On the other hand, his third Korean mini album Round 3 topped Gaon Weekly Charts, the Billboard World Albums chart, and the Oricon Imported Albums Chart.

== Studio albums ==
List of studio albums, with selected details, chart positions and sales
Title	Details	Peak chart positions			Sales
Title	Details	KOR	JPN	TWN East Asia	Sales
Unlimited	Released: December 12, 2012 (JPN); Label: Delicious Deli Records/Universal Music Japan; Format: CD, digital download	—	3	2	JPN: 100,000 (Gold)
Imademo	Released: February 11, 2015 (JPN); Label: Delicious Deli/Universal Music Japan; Format: CD, digital download	—	3	—	JPN: 100,000 (Gold)
New Way	Released: February 4, 2019 (KOR); Label: Henecia Music; Format: CD, digital download	9	120	—	KOR: 9,593
The Moon, The Sun and Your Song (月と太陽と君の歌)	Released: February 5, 2020 (JPN); Label: Henecia Music; Format: CD, digital download	—	4	—	
A Bell of Blessing	Released: October 19, 2020 (KOR); Label: Henecia Music; Format: CD, digital download	14	—	—	
Love Universe	Released: July 24, 2024; Label: Discovery Next; Format: CD, digital download	—	20	—	
"—" denotes releases that did not chart.

== Extended plays ==
List of studio albums, with selected details, chart positions and sales
Title	Details	Peak chart positions				Sales
Title	Details	KOR	JPN	TWN East Asia	US World	Sales
Break Down	Released: June 7, 2011 (KOR); Label: KeyEast; Format: CD, digital download	1	—	1	—	KOR: 114,642
Lucky	Released: October 11, 2011 (KOR); Label: KeyEast; Format: CD, digital download	1	4	—	5	KOR: 101,705
Round 3	Released: July 22, 2013 (KOR); Label: KeyEast; Format: CD, digital download	2	1	—	1	KOR: 111,776
Timing	Released: July 11, 2014 (KOR); Label: KeyEast; Format: CD, digital download	3	—	—	—	KOR: 33,329
Haze	Released: November 29, 2017 (KOR); Label: KeyEast; Format: Digital download	—	—	—	—	
"—" denotes releases that did not chart.

== Singles ==
List of singles, with selected chart positions
Title	Year	Peak chart positions			Sales (Note: Korean sales are for digital downloads, while Japanese sales are for physical, unless otherwise noted.)	Certifications	Album
Title	Year	KOR	JPN	TWN East Asia	Sales	Certifications	Album
Korean
"Please" (제발)	2011	29	—	—		—N/a	Break Down
"Break Down" (feat. Double K)	2011	15	—	—		—N/a	Break Down
"Kiss Kiss"	2011	65	—	—		—N/a	Break Down
"Lucky Guy"	2011	24	—	—		—N/a	Lucky
"Marry Me"	2011	55	—	—		—N/a	Non-album singles
"The Reason I Live" (나 살아있는 건)	2013	—	—	—		—N/a	Non-album singles
"Unbreakable" (feat. Jay Park)	2013	90	—	—		—N/a	Round 3
"Your Story" (feat. Dok2)	2013	15	—	—		—N/a	Round 3
"His Habit" (feat. Lim Kim & Kanto)	2014	—	—	—		—N/a	Timing
"Beauty Beauty"	2014	—	—	—		—N/a	Timing
"Haze"	2017	—	—	—		—N/a	Haze
"Why"	2019	—	—	—		—N/a	New Way
"The Smile in Wine" (포장마차에서)	2019	—	—	—		—N/a	Salt (single album)
"A Bell of Blessing"	2020	—	—	—		—N/a	A Bell of Blessing
"Cage"	2024	—	—	—		—N/a	Non-album singles
Japanese
"Kiss Kiss / Lucky Guy"	2012	—	2	5	JPN: 121,547	RIAJ: Gold (physical)	Unlimited
"Heat"	2012	—	1	2	JPN: 202,672	RIAJ: Gold (physical)	Unlimited
"Tonight"	2013	—	2	—	JPN: 250,000	RIAJ: Platinum (physical)	Imademo
"Hot Sun"	2014	—	1	1	JPN: 100,000	RIAJ: Gold (physical)	Imademo
"Kazaguruma Re:Wind" (風車 Re:Wind)	2017	—	3	—	JPN: 32,307		Non-album single
"Take My Hand"	2018	—	4	—	JPN: 44,500		The Moon, The Sun and Your Song
"Wait For Me"	2018	—	4	—	JPN: 20,228		The Moon, The Sun and Your Song
"This Is Love"	2019	—	8	—			The Moon, The Sun and Your Song
"Song for a Dreamer"	2022	—	10	—	JPN: 5,914		Non-album singles
"Hana Michi" (花路)	2023	—	9	—	JPN: 9,506		Non-album singles
"—" denotes releases that did not chart.

== Soundtrack contributions ==
Title	Year	Peak chart positions		Album
Title	Year	KOR	JPN	Album
"Because I'm Stupid (Acoustic Ver.)" (내 머리가 나빠서)	2009	—	—	Boys Over Flowers Luxury Edition OST
"A Thing Called Happiness" (행복이란)	2009	—	—	Boys Over Flowers F4 Special Edition OST
"One More Time"	2010	78	—	Playful Kiss OST
"If You're Like Me" (그대도 나와 같다면)	2012	86	—	The Wedding Scheme OST
"When Today Passes" (오늘이 지나면)	2014	—	—	Inspiring Generation OST
"Living Because ～僕が生きているのは～ / Timing"	2014	—	23	City Conquest OST
"Just For My Love"	2018	—	—	When Time Stopped OST
"Pure Love"	2019	—	—	One Page Love OST
"—" denotes releases that did not chart.

== Videography ==
=== Music videos ===
Song	Year
"제발 (Please)"	2011
"Break Down"	2011
"Kiss Kiss"	2011
"Lucky Guy"	2011
"Marry Me"	2011
"Marry You"	2011
"Kiss Kiss" (Japanese Ver.)	2012
"Lucky Guy" (Japanese Ver.)	2012
"Heat"	2012
"Let's Party"	2012
"Your Story"	2012
"Save Today"	2012
"君だけを消せなくて"	2013
"Cappuccino"	2013
"Tonight"	2013
"Unbreakable"	2013
"Your Story" Kor. version	2013
"Hot Sun"	2014
"Beauty Beauty"	2014
"Imademo"	2015
"Re:Wind Kazaguruma"	2017
"Take My Hand"	2018
"Wait For Me"	2018
"Why"	2019
"Four Seasons"	2019
"This is Love"	2019
"The Smile in Wine"	2019
"Moon, Sun and Your Song"	2020

=== Video albums ===
Title	Details	Peak chart positions
Title	Details	JPN
Good-Bye Yoon Ji-hoo (SS501のリーダー、キム・ヒョンジュン Good-Bye ユン・ジフ)	Released: December 18, 2009 (JPN); Label: SBS Contents Hub; Format: DVD	36
Ready, Action!: Kim Hyun Joong in Spain	Released: September 3, 2010 (JPN); Label: SBS Contents Hub; Format: DVD	60
1st Premium DVD & Photo Book "The First Love Story"	Released: October 29, 2010 (JPN); Label: KJ-net; Format: DVD	60
First Impact	Released: May 16, 2012 (JPN); Label: Universal Music Japan; Format: DVD	1
K-Pop Star Conquering The World (キム・ヒョンジュン 完全密着ドキュメント24時 ～K-POP スタ ー 世界を魅了する～)	Released: December 25, 2012 (JPN); Label: Universal Music Japan; Format: DVD	19
Kim Hyun Joong Premium Live "Tonight"	Released: December 25, 2013 (JPN); Label: Universal Music Japan; Format: DVD	12
2014 Kim Hyun Joong World Tour "夢幻" in Seoul	Released: December 22, 2014 (JPN); Label: Universal Music Japan; Format: DVD	13
Kim Hyun Joong Japan Tour 2015 "Gemini"	Released: December 16, 2015 (JPN); Label: Universal Music Japan; Format: DVD	7
Kim Hyun Joong Japan Tour 2017 "Inner Core"	Released: December 20, 2017 (JPN); Label: Universal Music Japan; Format: DVD	16
Kim Hyun Joong Japan Tour 2018 "Take My Hand"	Released: June 6, 2019 (JPN); Label: Discovery Entertainment; Format: DVD	15

== Songwriting credits ==
Song	Year	Details	Credits	Ref.
"Green Peas"	2009	Album: Rebirth; Language: Korean	Lyrics (with SS501)	
"Do You Like That"	2011	Album: Lucky; Language: Korean	Lyrics	
"Haze"	2017	Album: Haze EP; Language: Korean	Lyrics	
"Take My Hand"	2018	Single; Language: Japanese	Lyrics, composition, arrangement	
"Wait For Me"	2018	Single; Language: Japanese	Lyrics, composition, arrangement	
"New Way"	2019	Language: Korean	Lyrics, composition, arrangement	
"This is Love"	2019	Language: Japanese	Lyrics, composition, arrangement	
"Salt"	2019	Language: Korean	Lyrics, composition, arrangement	
"Moon, Sun and Your Song"	2020	Language: Japanese	Lyrics, composition, arrangement	

== See also ==
- SS501 discography
- Heo Young-saeng discography
- Kim Kyu-jong discography
- Park Jung-min discography
- Kim Hyung-jun discography
