= Heo Young-saeng discography =

South Korean musician discography

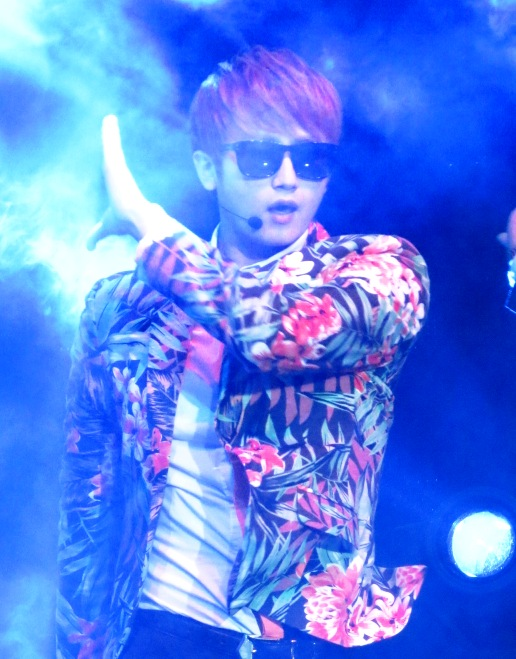
- Heo Young-saeng during his joint Fan Meeting tour in Mexico, 2013
- Studio albums: 2
- EPs: 4
- Soundtrack albums: 6
- Singles: 9
- Video albums: 5
- Music videos: 6
- Promotional singles: -

South Korean singer and main vocalist of SS501, Heo Young-saeng has released two studio albums, four EPs, six singles, six soundtrack contribution songs, two collaboration songs, and five DVDs.

During 2005–2010, Heo had three solo songs from SS501 albums: "Hajimete Miru Sora Datta" from Kokoro, "Is It Love?" from U R Man, and "Nameless Memory" from SS501 Solo Collection. In 2009, he contributed songs to the soundtracks for Friend, Our Legend and Will It Snow for Christmas? named "I Erase Tears" and "I Love You.. I'm Sorry.." respectively.

Heo Young-saeng's solo debut mini album, Let It Go, was released on May 12, 2011, and features "Park Joo Hyun", the main rapper of girl group Spica, on the music video, and Kim Kyu Jong and Hyuna on "Rainy Love" and "Let It Go" tracks respectively. The album peaked at number one on Gaon's album chart for the week starting on May 8, 2011. He was also featured in Kim Kyu-jong's song, "My Love" from Turn Me On album.

In 2012, Heo released his second mini-album entitled Solo in May, participating in the album's planning and production. He also went to Japan to release his first Japanese album entitled Overjoyed on September 19 under on the Pony Canyon Japan label.Overjoyed entered the Japanese Oricon weekly album charts at #29.

In 2013, Heo collaborated with Lee Jung Bong on a duet named "Goodbye My Love". He then released his third mini album Life on March 13. Before enlisting in October 2013, Heo first released two more albums, Memories To You in Japan on July 3, and She special album in Korea on October 16. The two albums were his parting gesture to his fans before his military duties.

== Studio albums ==
Year	Title	Album details	Peak positions		Sales and Certifications
Year	Title	Album details	KOR	JPN	Sales and Certifications
Japanese
2012	Overjoyed	Released: September 19, 2012; Label: Pony Canyon	—	29	
2013	Memories to You	Released: July 3, 2013; Label: Pony Canyon	—	31	
"—" denotes releases that did not chart or were not released in that region.

== Extended plays ==
Year	Title	Details	Peak positions		Sales and Certifications
Year	Title	Details	KOR	JPN	Sales and Certifications
Korean
2011	Let It Go	Released: May 12, 2011; Label: B2M Entertainment	1	—	KOR: 32,078
2012	SOLO	Released: May 22, 2012; Label: B2M Entertainment	4	—	KOR: 17,547
2013	Life	Released: March 14, 2013; Label: B2M Entertainment	1	—	KOR: 11,892
2013	She	Released: October 16, 2013; Label: B2M Entertainment	5	—	KOR: 8,192
2019	Moment	Released: June 8, 2019; Label: KQ Entertainment	24	—	
"—" denotes releases that did not chart or were not released in that region.

== Singles ==
Year	Title	Peak positions		Sales and Certifications	Album
Year	Title	KOR	JPN	Sales and Certifications	Album
Korean
2008	"Is It Love?" (사랑인거죠)	—	—		U R Man
2009	"이름없는 기억" (Nameless Memory)	—	—		SS501 Solo Collection
2011	"Let It Go" (ft. Hyuna)	19	—		Let It Go
2011	"Rainy Heart" (ft. Kim Kyu-jong)	—	—		Let It Go
2012	"Crying"	39	—		SOLO
2013	"Art of Seduction"	41	—		Life
2013	"Weak Child"	—	—		She
2018	"지구가 멸망해도 (Feat. 매드클라운)"				Dream;Fly
2021	"Mi Casa Su Casa"				
Japanese
2007	"Hajimete Miru Sora Datta" (はじめて見る空だった)	—	—		Kokoro (Limited Edition B, Young-saeng Ver.)
2012	"1.2.3"	—	—		Overjoyed
2018	"After The Rain"	—	—		JAPAN 1st SINGLE
"—" denotes releases that did not chart or were not released in that region.

=== As featured artist ===
Year	Title	Peak positions		Sales and Certifications	Album
Year	Title	KOR	JPN	Sales and Certifications	Album
2011	"My Love" (Kim Kyu-jong ft. Heo Young-saeng)	—	—		Turn Me On
2013	"Goodbye My Love" (Lee Jung Bong ft. Heo Young-saeng)	—	—		러브 샤랄랄라
"—" denotes releases that did not chart or were not released in that region.

== Soundtrack contributions ==
Year	Title	Peak positions		Album
Year	Title	KOR	JPN	Album
2009	"눈물을 지워가" (I Erase Tears)	—	—	Friend, Our Legend
2009	"사랑해요..미안해요.." (I Love You.. I'm Sorry..)	—	—	Will It Snow for Christmas? OST
2011	"슬픈 노래는" (Sad Song)	97	—	Protect the Boss OST
2011	"입술에 맺힌 말" (The Words On My Lips)	—	—	Kimchi Family OST
2012	"Love Song"	—	—	I Need a Fairy OST
2012	"바라본다" (Gazing)	—	—	Rascal Sons OST
2016	'I can not forget'		—	Blow Breeze OST
2016	'너는 나니까 (Only You)'		—	Ugly Miss Young-ae OST
2017	"버 티 고 있 지 만" (I'm standing but)	—	—	One Step
2017	"바라보기" (Looking)		—	The Emperor: Owner of the Mask
2017	"—" denotes releases that did not chart or were not released in that region.			

== Video albums ==
Year	Title	Details	Peak positions		Sales and Certifications	Track listing
Year	Title	Details	KOR	JPN	Sales and Certifications	Track listing
2011	Heo Young-saeng & Kim Kyu-jong 1st Private DVD "Summer and Love"	Release Date: March 25, 2011 (Japan); Format: 2DVD, photobook	—	236	-	—N/a
2011	Heo Young-saeng & Kim Kyu-jong 1st Private DVD & Photo Book "Summer and Love" Release Memorial Fan Meeting Event	Release Date: April 15, 2011 (Japan); Format: 1DVD, photobook; Running Time: 90 min.; Event: Fan Meeting at Shibuya C.C. Lemon Hall on January 22, 2011	—	213	-	—N/a
2011	First Solo Story	Release Date: September 21, 2011 (Japan); September 30, 2011 (Korea); Format: 2DVD, photobook, photo cards; Running Time: 114 min. (Korea Ver.), 126 min. (Japan Ver.)	—	119	-	Track listing Korea Ver. Disc 1 - 78 min.: 1. "Let It Go" story; 1. Teaser Ver.; 2. Music Video Full Ver.; 3. Making Film; 4. Special Angles 1 - Close-Up Ver.; 5. Special Angles 2 - Dance Ver.; 6. Special Angles 3 - Director's Ver.; 2. "Rainy Heart" story; 1. Music Video Full Ver.; 2. Making Film; 3. Special Angles 1 - Close-Up Ver.; 4. Special Angles 2 - How To Make "Rainy Heart" Music Video; 5. Music Video On Air Ver.; Disc 2 - 36 min.: 1. Heo Young-saeng story; 1. Interview; 2. Bonus story; 1. NG Collection; 2. Staff Credit; Japan Ver. Disc 1 - 78 min.: 1. "Let It Go" story; 1. Teaser Ver.; 2. Music Video Full Ver.; 3. Making Film; 4. Special Angles 1 - Close-Up Ver.; 5. Special Angles 2 - Dance Ver.; 6. Special Angles 3 - Director's Ver.; 2. "Rainy Heart" story; 1. Music Video Full Ver.; 2. Making Film; 3. Special Angles 1 - Close-Up Ver.; 4. Special Angles 2 - How To Make "Rainy Heart" Music Video; 5. Music Video On Air Ver.; Disc 2 - 48 min.: 1. Interview, Special Letter; 2. Photo Slide Show; 3. NG Collection; 4. Staff Credit
2012	Heo Young-saeng & Kim Kyu-jong Young Saeng + Kyu Jong's 1st Story in Tokyo - Y.E.S & ThanKYU Japan	Release Date: September 19, 2012 (Japan); Format: 2DVD, photobook; Running Time: 180 min.; Event: Fan Meeting on November 4, 2011	—	—	-	Track listing Disc 1: 1. Young Saeng + Kyu Jong 1st Party in Tokyo; Disc 2: 1. Making Film 1 - Young Saeng; 2. Making Film 2 - Kyu Jong; 3. Find Your Moment (High-Five event)
2013	Heo Young Saeng Concert 2012 - Overjoyed	Release Date: February 20, 2013 (Japan); Format: 2DVD, photobook; Running Time: 120 min.; Event: Concert at Shibuya-AX on September 22, 2012	—	43	-	Track listing Disc 1: 1. "1.2.3"; 2. "DraMagic!"; 3. "Let It Go"; 4. "Crying"; 5. "イルムオムヌンキオック"; 6. "Find" (Rock ver.); 7. "Intimidated"; 8. "Out The Club"; 9. "True Tears"; 10. "とぎれた夜をつないで"; 11. "Maria"; 12. "Love Ya"; 13. SS501 medley ("Kokoro" / "Distance~君とのキョリ" / "LIVE!" / "LUCKY DAYS"); 14. "All My Love"; 15. "Beautiful"; 16. "Dream On"; 17. "Hello Mello"; Disc 2 (bonus): 1. Talk show and after-sales 2. Making/shooting of "Over joyed" jacket
2014	CONCERT 2013 - OMOIDE WO KIMI NI-JAPAN	Release Date: January 29, 2014 (Japan); Format: 2DVD	—	43	-	Track listing Disc 1: 1. "INTRO"; 2. "Let It Go"; 3. "Crying"; 4. "Rainy Heart"; 5. "Intimidated"; 6. "1.2.3"; 7. "DraMagic!"; 8. "The Art of Seduction"; 9. "Know It All"; 10. ."Hajimete Miru Sora Datta"; 11. ."Is It Love?" acoustic ver.; 12. "Mermaid..."; 13. "Starry Sky"; 14. "Because I'm Stupid"; 15. "Find"; 16. "SS501 medley" 17. "All My Love"; 18. "Always You and I"; 19. "Coward"; 20. "Hello Mello"; Disc 2: 1. Bonus video

== Videography ==
=== Music videos ===
Year	Song	Director	Length
2011	"Let It Go"		3:49
2011	"Rainy Heart"		3:41
2012	"Crying"	Moon Seung-joo (문성주)	4:09
2012	"1.2.3"	Moon Min Ju	4:15
2013	"The Art Of Seduction"	Kim Eun-yu (김은유)	3:43
2013	"Weak Child"		3:55
2018	"지구가 멸망해도"		4:11

== Others ==
=== Production credits ===
Year	Song	Artist	Role	Album
2008	"Is It Love"	SS501	composer	U R Man
2009	"Green Peas"	SS501	co-lyricist (with SS501)	Rebirth
2010	"Until Forever"	SS501	lyricist	Destination
2011	"Out The Club"	himself	lyricist	Let It Go
2011	"Rainy Heart"	himself	lyricist	Let It Go
2011	"I'm Broken"	himself	lyricist	Let It Go
2012	"Crying"	himself	lyricist	Solo
2016	"21 Gram"	Double S 301	lyricist	Eternal 5
2016	"Shining Star"	Double S 301	lyricist (with Double S 301)	Estreno
2016	"Remove"	Double S 301	lyricist, composer, arranger	Eternal 0 & Eternal 1
2016	"Luv With U"	Double S 301	lyricist, composer, arranger	Eternal 0 & Eternal 1
2016	"Only our memories" (僕らだけの想い出)	Double S 301	lyricist	S

=== Concerts/Major Fan meetings ===
The following is an incomplete list of Heo Young-saeng's concerts, major fan meetings, and tours.

Year	Concert title	Details
2010	Kyu Jong & Young Saeng Story In Seoul	Place: Korea, Hong Kong, Japan...; Start date: December 4, 2010
2012	1st Solo Concert in Japan	Venue: Shibuya-AX in Tokyo - September 22; ZEPP Namba in Osaka - September 24
2013	2nd Solo Concert in Japan	Venue: Zepp, Tokyo - July 11
2013	First South and Latin America fanmeeting	Cities: Lima, Mexico City, Arequipa; Date: August 17, 20, 24
2013	2013 Heo Young Saeng Seoul Concert 0513 My Story	Date: October 20, 7pm; Venue: UNIQLO AX Hall in Seoul
2015	Heo Young Saeng: Hello Again	Place: Korea, Japan; Venue: SungShin Women University (KR), Tokyo (JP); Date: August 29 (KR), September 30 (JP)

== See also ==
- SS501 discography
- Kim Hyun-joong discography
- Kim Kyu-jong discography
- Park Jung-min discography
- Kim Hyung-jun discography
