= Kisser =

A kisser is one who kisses.

Kisser or Kissers may also refer to:

- Kisser (surname)
- Kissers is a term used for the Followers of Christ church and its members
- Kissers and Killers is an album name from The Choir (alternative rock band)
- slang for Mouth or Face

== See also ==
- The Kiss (disambiguation)
- Kiss Kiss (disambiguation)
