= Steven Lee (music producer) =

- Origin: Cypress, California, United States
- Genres: Pop; pop rock; R&B; urban contemporary; soul; alternative dance; hip hop; J-pop; K-pop
- Occupations: Record producer; songwriter
- Instruments: Keyboard; guitar; programming
- Years active: 2001–present
- Label: Studio NES/Self-published

Steven Lee is an American music producer, songwriter, and instrumentalist. He studied music & theory in California State University, Los Angeles, and began a career in music songwriting and production after he won "Star Search" as a music producer at Studio56. He was also recognized as USA Songwriting Competition finalist in the dance music category in 2004. His latest production and songwriting work includes the single "In Memories" for the Avengers: Age of Ultron soundtrack. Lee has produced and written for many Asian acts, including Arashi, KAT-TUN, Namie Amuro, TVXQ, Exo, Hey! Say! JUMP, Kis-My-Ft2, BoA, SS501, Super Junior, Shinee, Girls' Generation, V6, Sexy Zone, Kim Hyun Joong, Tomohisa Yamashita, Wheesung, B1A4, F.T. Island, Yuma Nakayama, E-girls, Da-iCE, Got7, A.B.C-Z and WEST.. He has also produced and written for many international acts, including US5, Ian Thomas, Lena Katina (t.A.T.u), After Romeo, The United and Varsity Fanclub. He also composed "Secret Garden", "Remember Me", and "Nonstop" for Oh My Girl.

== Selected awards and certifications ==
- 2005 The Japan Gold Disc Award - "Summary of Johnny's World Music DVD" - Gold
- 2005 The Japan Gold Disc Award - "Kaizokuban Music DVD" - Platinum
- 2006 The Japan Gold Disc Award - "Kaizokuban Music DVD" - Best Music DVD of the Year
- 2006 The Japan Gold Disc Award - "Best of KAT-TUN" - Triple Platinum
- 2006 The Japan Gold Disc Award - "Best of KAT-TUN" - Best 10 Albums of the Year
- 2006 The Japan Gold Disc Award - "V6-Good Day!" - Gold
- 2007 The Japan Gold Disc Award - "Real Face Live DVD" - Platinum
- 2007 The Japan Gold Disc Award - "Real Face Live DVD" - Best Music DVD of the Year
- 2007 The Japan Gold Disc Award - "Ultra Music Power" - Platinum
- 2007 The Japan Gold Disc Award - "Ultra Music Power" - Best 10 Singles of the Year
- 2008 The Japan Gold Disc Award - Hey! Say! JUMP Debut & First Concert Ikinari! in Tokyo Dome (2008) DVD" - Gold
- 2008 The Japan Gold Disc Award - "KAT-TUN III - Queens of Pirates" - Platinum
- 2009 The Japan Gold Disc Award - "KAT-TUN Live Tour 2008 Queen of Pirates DVD" - Gold
- 2009 The Japan Gold Disc Award - "Break the Records - by you & for you-" - Platinum
- 2009 KBS TV Music Bank Korea - "Love Like This" K-Chart No.1 - 2 Weeks (09.11.13)
- 2009 SBS TV Inkigayo Korea - "Love Like This" - No.1 "Mutizen Song" (09.11.22)
- 2009 The Japan Gold Disc Award - "Hey! Say! Jump-ing Tour '08-'09 DVD" - Gold (2X)
- 2009 The Japan Gold Disc Award - "KAT-TUN Live Break the Records DVD" - Gold
- 2010 KBS TV Musicbank Korea - "Love Ya" Song No.1 Single of the Week "Mutizen Song" (10.06.11)
- 2010 The Japan Gold Disc Award - "No More Pain" - Gold (2X)
- 2010 The Japan Gold Disc Award - "Jump NO.1" - Gold (2X)
- 2010 The Japan Gold Disc Award - ｢ありがとう｣～世界のどこにいても～ - Gold
- 2011 The Japan Gold Disc Award - "KAT-TUN -NO MORE PAIИ- WORLD TOUR 2010 DVD" - Gold (4X)
- 2011 The Japan Gold Disc Award - "SUMMARY 2010 DVD" - Gold (2X)
- 2011 M-Net M Countdown Korea - "Break Down" K-Chart No.1 - 2weeks (11.06.13)
- 2011 KBS TV Music Bank Korea - "Break Down" No,1 Single of the Week - 2 Weeks (11.06.17)
- 2011 The Japan Gold Disc Award - "KIS-MY-FT2 - The 1st Single - Everybody Go" - Platinum (2X)
- 2011 KBS TV Music Bank Korea - "Lucky Guy" Music Bank - No,1 Single of the Week (11.10.21)
- 2011 The Japan Gold Disc Award - "KIS-MY-FT2 - Everybody Go at 横浜アリーナ DVD" - Gold (3X)
- 2011 The Japan Gold Disc Award - "Kis-My-Ftに逢えるde Show vol.3 at 国立代々木競技場第一体育館" - Gold
- 2012 The Japan Gold Disc Award - Shinee - "The First" - Gold
- 2012 The Japan Gold Disc Award - Kim Hyun Joong "Kiss Kiss / Lucky Guy" - Gold (4X)
- 2012 The Japan Gold Disc Award - "KIS-MY-FT2 - The 1st Album - Kis-My-1st" - Platinum (3X)
- 2012 The Japan Gold Disc Award - "Hey! Say! Jump" - 2nd Album "Jump World" - Gold
- 2012 The Japan Gold Disc Award - "KIS-MY-FT2 - DVD - Kis-My-Mint" - Gold (6X)
- 2012 The Japan Gold Disc Award - Kim Hyun Joong "Heat" - Gold (2X)
- 2013 The Japan Gold Disc Award - Sexy Zone 1st Album "one SEXY Zone" - Gold (3X)
- 2013 The Japan Gold Disc Award - Kim Hyun Joong "Unlimited" - Gold (9X)
- 2013 The Japan Gold Disc Award - "KIS-MY-FT2 - The 2nd Album - Goodいくぜ!" - Platinum (2X)
- 2013 The Japan Gold Disc Award - Kim Hyun Joong 3rd Single "Tonight" - Gold
- 2013 The Japan Gold Disc Award - "Hey! Say! Jump" - "10th Single" - Platinum
- 2013 The Japan Gold Disc Award - Amuro Namie "Feel" - Platinum
- 2013 The Japan Gold Disc Award - KAT-TUN "1st Mini Album" - Gold (3X)
- 2013 The Japan Gold Disc Award - Shinee - "Boys Meet U" - Gold
- 2014 The Japan Gold Disc Award - Girls' Generation "Love & Peace" - Gold
- 2014 The Japan Gold Disc Award - KIS-MY-FT2 "Snow Dome no yakusoku DVD" - Gold (4X)
- 2014 The Japan Gold Disc Award - Sexy Zone - 2nd Album "Sexy Second" - Gold
- 2014 The Japan Gold Disc Award - TVXQ - "Tree" - Platinum (2X)
- 2014 The Japan Gold Disc Award - Amuro Namie - DVD "Feel Tour" - Gold (2X)
- 2014 The Japan Gold Disc Award - KAT-TUN - "come Here" - Gold
- 2014 The Japan Gold Disc Award - Girls' Generation "The Best" - Gold
- 2014 The Japan Gold Disc Award - TVXQ - "2014 Tree Tour DVD/Blu-ray" - Gold (3X)
- 2014 The Japan Gold Disc Award - Johnnys West - "ジパング・おおきに大作戦/夢を抱きしめて" - Gold
- 2014 The Japan Gold Disc Award - Sexy Zone - "男 never give up" - Gold
- 2014 The Japan Gold Disc Award - Arashi - "The Digitalian" - Platinum (3X)

== Original songs (released) ==
| Artist | Song (Title) | Label | Credit | Release |
|---|---|---|---|---|
| Enomoto Atsuko | To Rainbow | Avex, Japan | Songwriter | September 15, 2004 |
| KAT-TUN | Never Again | Johnny's Entertainment, Japan | Songwriter | April 19, 2005 |
| Biyuden | Aimaimi Mind (曖昧ミMIND) | Up-Front Works, Japan | Songwriter | May 25, 2005 |
| W | Miss Love Tantei (Missラブ探偵) | Up-Front Works, Japan | Songwriter | September 7, 2005 |
| TVXQ | Your Love Is All I Need (작은고백) | SM Entertainment, Korea | Lyricist | September 14, 2005 |
| Tomiko Van (Do As Infinity) | Farewell | Avex Trax, Japan | Songwriter | March 29, 2006 |
| V6 (Coming Century) | Justice | Johnny's Entertainment / Avex Trax, Japan | Songwriter | June 14, 2006 |
| Johnny's Jr (Kitayama Hiromitsu) | Chikara (チカラ) | Johnny's Entertainment, Japan | Songwriter | October, 2006 |
| Park Yong Ha | Close | Pony Canyon, Japan | Songwriter | January 1, 2007 |
| Johnny's Jr | Until the End | Johnny's Entertainment, Japan | Songwriter | September, 2007 |
| Hey! Say! 7 | Days | Johnny's Entertainment, Japan | Songwriter | August, 2007 |
| Hey! Say! JUMP | Star Time | Johnny's Entertainment, Japan | Songwriter | November 14, 2008 |
| Takizawa Hideaki (Tackey & Tsubasa) | Your Love | Johnny's Entertainment / Avex Trax, Japan | Songwriter | January 23, 2008 |
| Hey! Say! JUMP (Kota Yabu) | My Everything | Johnny's Entertainment, Japan | Producer, Songwriter, Lyricist, Arranger, Engineer | April, 2008 |
| KAT-TUN | Hell, No | Johnny's Entertainment, Japan | Producer, Songwriter, Arranger, Engineer | June 4, 2008 |
| SS501 | The ONE | DSP Entertainment, Korea | Lyricist, Vocal Director | November 24, 2008 |
| SS501 | Want It | DSP Entertainment, Korea | Lyricist, Vocal Director | November 24, 2008 |
| US5 | Out Of Time | Sony BMG, Germany | Songwriter | February 9, 2009 |
| US5 | The One | Sony BMG, Germany | Songwriter | February 9, 2009 |
| Aikawa Nanase | Goodbye Yesterday | Avex Trax, Japan | Songwriter | February 19, 2009 |
| Super Junior | Sorry, Sorry | SM Entertainment, Korea | English Vocal Production | March 13, 2009 |
| Super Junior | Why I Like You (니가좋은이유) | SM Entertainment, Korea | English Vocal Production | March 13, 2009 |
| SS501 | The ONE (Remix) | DSP Entertainment, Japan | Lyricist, Re-mixer | March 25, 2009 |
| KAT-TUN | Sadistic Love | Johnny's Entertainment, Japan | Songwriter | April 29, 2009 |
| Super Junior | Love Disease (사랑이죽는병) | SM Entertainment, Korea | Publishing | May 15, 2009 |
| Kis-My-Ft2 | Hair | Johnny's Entertainment, Japan | Songwriter | July 11, 2009 |
| Hey! Say! JUMP | To the top | Johnny's Entertainment, Japan | Songwriter | July 23, 2009 |
| SS501 | CRAZY 4 U | DSP Entertainment, Korea | Producer, Songwriter, Vocal director, Keyboard & programming, Mixing | August 1, 2009 |
| SS501 | Only One Day (하루만) | DSP Entertainment, Korea | Producer, Songwriter, Vocal director, Keyboard & programming | August 1, 2009 |
| SS501 | Love Like This | DSP Entertainment, Korea | Producer, Songwriter, Keyboard & programming, Director | August 1, 2009 |
| SS501 | Green Peas (완.두.콩) | DSP Entertainment, Korea | Producer, Music, Arrangement, Director | August 1, 2009 |
| Hey! Say! JUMP (Hikaru Yaotome) | 1000 Light | Johnny's Entertainment, Japan | Songwriter | August 3, 2009 |
| Wheesung | Over U | Pop-up Entertainment, Korea | Producer, Songwriter, Keyboard, Programming | October 10, 2009 |
| Wheesung | ALONE | Pop-up Entertainment, Korea | Producer, Songwriter, Keyboard, Programming | October 10, 2009 |
| Wheesung | One Kiss | Pop-up Entertainment, Korea | Producer, Songwriter, Keyboard, Programming | October 10, 2009 |
| SS501 | Wasteland | DSP Entertainment, Korea | Producer, Songwriter, Keyboard & programming, Director | October 20, 2009 |
| SS501 | Obsess (중독) | DSP Entertainment, Korea | Producer, Songwriter, Keyboard & programming, Director | October 20, 2009 |
| f(x) | Step by Me | SM Entertainment, Korea | Publishing | November 9, 2009 |
| Hey! Say! JUMP (Hey! Say! Best) | Score | Johnny's Entertainment, Japan | Songwriter, Producer | March, 2010 |
| Lee Hyori | Get 2 Know | M-Net, Korea | Publishing | April 14, 2010 |
| KAT-TUN | Fall Down | Johnny's Entertainment, Japan | Songwriter, Co-arranger, Keyboards | May 12, 2010 |
| SS501 | Let Me Be The One | DSP Entertainment, Korea | Producer, Songwriter, Programming, Vocal Director | May 24, 2010 |
| SS501 | Love Ya | DSP Entertainment, Korea | Producer, Songwriter, Keyboards, Programming, Vocal Director | May 24, 2010 |
| SS501 | Until Forever (영원토록) | DSP Entertainment, Korea | Publishing, Vocal Director | May 24, 2010 |
| SS501 | Let Me Be The One (Acoustic Version) | DSP Entertainment, Korea | Producer, Songwriter, Programming, Vocal Director, Mixing | May 24, 2010 |
| KAT-TUN | N.M.P. (No More Pain) | Johnny's Entertainment, Japan | Producer, Songwriter, Keyboard, Programming | June 16, 2010 |
| KAT-TUN | Right Now | Johnny's Entertainment, Japan | Producer, Songwriter, Keyboard, Programming | June 16, 2010 |
| Hey! Say! JUMP | Thank You | Johnny's Entertainment, Japan | Songwriter | July 7, 2010 |
| Shinee | Obsession (욕) | SM Entertainment, Korea | Publishing | July 19, 2010 |
| Shinee | Shout Out (악) | SM Entertainment, Korea | Producer, Songwriter, Keyboards & programming | July 19, 2010 |
| 4Minute | Superstar | M-Net, Korea | Publishing | July 19, 2010 |
| Varsity Fanclub | Forgotten | USA | Producer, Songwriter, Keyboards, Programming | August, 2010 |
| Varsity Fanclub | Love Like This | USA | Producer, Songwriter, Keyboards, Programming | August, 2010 |
| Girls' Generation | 내잘못이죠 (Mistake) | SM Entertainment, Korea | Publishing | October 27, 2010 |
| Hey! Say! JUMP | Arigatou (｢ありがとう｣～世界のどこにいても～) | Johnny's Entertainment, Japan | Producer, Songwriter, Keyboards, Programming | Dec 15, 2010 |
| Takizawa Hideaki (Tackey & Tsubasa) | 僕のカケラ | Johnny's Entertainment, Japan | Songwriter | January 1, 2011 |
| Takizawa Hideaki (Tackey & Tsubasa) | Let Me Be | Johnny's Entertainment, Japan | Producer, Songwriter, Keyboards, Programming | January 1, 2011 |
| Rainbow | So Cool | DSP Entertainment, Korea | Producer, Songwriter, Vocal Director | April 7, 2011 |
| Rainbow | To Me (내게로..) | DSP Entertainment, Korea | Additional Engineering | April 7, 2011 |
| Heo Young-saeng | Out the Club | B2M Entertainment, Korea | Producer, Songwriter, Keyboards, Programming, Vocal Director | May 12, 2011 |
| Heo Young-saeng | Rainy Heart | B2M Entertainment, Korea | Producer, Songwriter, Keyboards, Programming, Chorus, Vocal Director | May 12, 2011 |
| Heo Young-saeng | I'm Broken | B2M Entertainment, Korea | Producer, Songwriter, Vocal Director | May 12, 2011 |
| Kim Hyun-joong | Intro (Let Me Go) | Keyeast, Korea | Producer, Songwriter, Keyboards, Programming, Chorus, Vocal Director | June 8, 2011 |
| Kim Hyun-joong | Break Down | Keyeast, Korea | Producer, Songwriter, Keyboards, Programming, Chorus, Vocal Director | June 8, 2011 |
| Kim Hyun-joong | Please (제발) | Keyeast, Korea | Producer, Songwriter, Keyboards, Guitar, Programming, Vocal Director | June 8, 2011 |
| Kim Hyun-joong | Kiss Kiss | Keyeast, Korea | Producer, Songwriter, Keyboards, Programming, Vocal Director | June 8, 2011 |
| Kim Hyun-joong | Yes I Will | Keyeast, Korea | Producer, Songwriter, Keyboards, Programming, Vocal Director | June 8, 2011 |
| Ian Thomas | Kiss Kiss | ARS Entertainment/Universal Belgium | Songwriter | July, 2011 |
| Kis-My-Ft2 | S.O.Kiss | Johnny's Entertainment, Japan | Songwriter | August 10, 2011 |
| Kis-My-Ft2 | Kiss For U | Johnny's Entertainment, Japan | Producer, Songwriter, Keyboards, Programming | August 10, 2011 |
| Chocolat | 신드롬 (Symdrome) | Paramount, Korea | Publishing | August 17, 2011 |
| Kim Hyun-joong | Lucky Guy | Keyeast, Korea | Producer, Songwriter, Keyboards, Programming | October 11, 2011 |
| Kim Hyun-joong | U | Keyeast, Korea | Producer, Songwriter, Keyboards, Programming | October 11, 2011 |
| Kim Hyun-joong | Do You Like That | Keyeast, Korea | Producer, Songwriter, Keyboards, Programming | October 11, 2011 |
| Kim Hyun-joong | Smile | Keyeast, Korea | Lyricist, Vocal Production | October 11, 2011 |
| Girls' Generation | 봄날 (How Great Is Your Love) | SM Entertainment, Korea | Publishing | October 19, 2011 |
| Shinee | BETTER | EMI Japan | Producer, Songwriter, Keyboards & programming | Dec 07, 2011 |
| Shinee | Start | EMI Japan | Publishing | Dec 07, 2011 |
| Chocolat | 하루만더 | Paramount, Korea | Publishing | Dec 15, 2011 |
| Chocolat | 싫어싫어 | Paramount, Korea | Publishing | Dec 15, 2011 |
| Chocolat | 너만을 보고 너만을 그리는 | Paramount, Korea | Publishing | Dec 15, 2011 |
| Kim Hyun-joong | Marry Me | Keyeast, Korea | Producer, Songwriter, Keyboards, Programming | Dec 15, 2011 |
| Kim Hyun-joong | Marry You | Keyeast, Korea | Producer, Songwriter, Keyboards, Programming | Dec 15, 2011 |
| Lee Joon-gi | The Rain | IMX, Japan | Producer, Songwriter, Keyboards, Programming, Chorus, Additional Mix, Mastering | March 16, 2012 |
| Kis-My-Ft2 | Tell Me Why | Johnny's Entertainment, Japan | Songwriter | March 28, 2012 |
| Kis-My-Ft2 | Good Night | Johnny's Entertainment, Japan | Songwriter | March 28, 2012 |
| Kis-My-Ft2 | Take Over | Johnny's Entertainment, Japan | Producer, Songwriter, Keyboards, Programming | March 28, 2012 |
| A-Jax | Never Let Go (너밖에 몰라서) | DSP Entertainment, Korea | Producer, Songwriter, Keyboards, Programming, Vocal Director | May 15, 2012 |
| Heo Young-saeng | Crying | B2M Entertainment, Korea | Producer, Songwriter, Keyboards, Programming, Vocal Director | May 22, 2012 |
| Heo Young-saeng | Maria (눈물나무) | B2M Entertainment, Korea | Producer, Songwriter, Keyboards, Programming, Vocal Director | May 22, 2012 |
| Heo Young-saeng | Hello Mello (Only Love) | B2M Entertainment, Korea | Producer, Songwriter, Keyboards, Programming, Vocal Director | May 22, 2012 |
| A-Jax | One 4 U | DSP Entertainment, Korea | Producer, Songwriter, Keyboards, Programming, Vocal Director | June 1, 2012 |
| Kim Hyun-joong | Let's Party | Universal, Japan | Producer, Songwriter, Keyboards, Programming | July 4, 2012 |
| A-Jax | Hot Game | DSP Entertainment, Korea | Producer, Songwriter, Vocal Director | July 12, 2012 |
| Sexy Zone | Teleportation | Johnny's Entertainment, Japan | Songwriter | August 22, 2012 |
| Sexy Zone | Rouge | Johnny's Entertainment, Japan | Songwriter | August 22, 2012 |
| Heo Young-saeng | Hello Mello (Japanese Ver) | Pony Canyon, Japan | Songwriter | September 19, 2012 |
| Heo Young-saeng | Crying (Japanese Ver) | Pony Canyon, Japan | Producer, Songwriter, Keyboards, Programming | September 19, 2012 |
| Heo Young-saeng | Vacation | Pony Canyon, Japan | Producer, Songwriter, Keyboards, Programming | September 19, 2012 |
| Heo Young-saeng | Beautiful | Pony Canyon, Japan | Publishing | September 19, 2012 |
| Heo Young-saeng | Timeless Love | Pony Canyon, Japan | Publishing | September 19, 2012 |
| B1A4 | Empty Mind | Pony Canyon, Japan | Producer, Songwriter, Keyboards, Programming | October 24, 2012 |
| A-Jax | ホットゲーム (Hot Game) | Universal, Japan | Producer, Songwriter | October 31, 2012 |
| Sexy Zone | 君と… Milky way | Johnny's Entertainment, Japan | Songwriter | November 7, 2012 |
| A-Jax | 잡을테면 잡아봐 | DSP Entertainment, Korea | Producer, Songwriter, Keyboard, Programming | November 15, 2012 |
| A-Jax | Your Song (너의노래) | DSP Entertainment, Korea | Producer, Songwriter, Keyboard, Programming | November 15, 2012 |
| Kim Hyun-joong | Your Story | Universal, Japan | Songwriter, Director | December 12, 2012 |
| Kim Hyun-joong | Save Today | Universal, Japan | Songwriter, Director | December 12, 2012 |
| Kim Hyun-joong | I'm Yours | Universal, Japan | Producer, Songwriter, Keyboards, Programming | December 12, 2012 |
| Shinee | 1000年、ずっとそばにいて… | EMI Japan | Producer, Songwriter, Keyboards, Programming | December 12, 2012 |
| FTIsland | Come Into My Dream | Warner Music, Japan | Producer, Songwriter, Keyboards, Programming | March 27, 2013 |
| Kis-My-Ft2 | Black and White | Johnny's Entertainment, Japan | Producer, Songwriter, Keyboards, Programming | March 27, 2013 |
| Kis-My-Ft2 | xLunaSx | Johnny's Entertainment, Japan | Songwriter | March 27, 2013 |
| Kim Hyun-joong | Cappuccino | Universal, Japan | Producer, Songwriter | June 5, 2013 |
| Shinee | Breaking News | EMI Japan | Producer, Songwriter, Keyboards & programming | June 26, 2013 |
| Shinee | Burning Up! | EMI Japan | Producer, Songwriter, Keyboards & programming | June 26, 2013 |
| Hey! Say! JUMP | New Hope〜こんなに僕らはひとつ | Johnny's Entertainment, Japan | Songwriter | June 26, 2013 |
| Namie Amuro | Supernatural Love | Avex, Japan | Producer, Songwriter, Keyboards & programming, Mix | July 10, 2013 |
| Kim Hyun-joong | Unbreakable (Feat. Jay Park) | KeyEast, Korea | Producer, Songwriter, Lyricist, Keyboards & programming, Korean percussions | July 18, 2013 |
| Kim Hyun-joong | Your Story (Feat. Dok2) | KeyEast, Korea | Producer, Songwriter, Keyboards & programming | July 29, 2013 |
| Kim Hyun-joong | Let's Party (Korean Ver) | KeyEast, Korea | Producer, Songwriter, Keyboards & programming | July 29, 2013 |
| Exo | XOXO (Kiss&Hugs) | SM Entertainment, Korea | Producer, Songwriter | August 5, 2013 |
| Kis-My-Ft2 | Diamond Honey | Johnny's Entertainment, Japan | Producer, Songwriter, Keyboards & programming | August 14, 2013 |
| Kis-My-Ft2 / Musical "Dream Boys JET" | Survivor | Johnny's Entertainment, Japan | Producer, Songwriter, Keyboards | September 6, 2013 |
| Namie Amuro | Neonlight Lipstick | Avex, Japan | Producer, Songwriter, Keyboards & programming | October 2, 2013 |
| KAT-TUN | Gimme Luv | Johnny's Entertainment, Japan | Producer, Songwriter, Keyboards & programming | November 27, 2013 |
| KAT-TUN | Fire and Ice | Johnny's Entertainment, Japan | Producer, Songwriter, Keyboards & programming | November 27, 2013 |
| KAT-TUN | 4U | Johnny's Entertainment, Japan | Songwriter | November 27, 2013 |
| Girls' Generation | Flyers | Universal, Japan | Songwriter | December 11, 2013 |
| Sexy Zone | そばにいるよ (Sobani Iruyo) | Johnny's Entertainment, Japan | Songwriter | February 19, 2014 |
| TVXQ | 信じるまま (Shinjiru Mama) | Avex Trax, Japan | Producer, Songwriter, Keyboards, Programming | March 5, 2014 |
| TVXQ | Crazy Crazy Crazy | Avex Trax, Japan | Producer, Songwriter, Keyboards, Programming | March 5, 2014 |
| Yuma Nakayama | High Five | Johnny's Entertainment, Japan | Songwriter | April 2, 2014 |
| The United | Come On! Come On! ~ Happy With Smile~ | Farm Records, Japan | Producer, Songwriter, Programming, Mix | April 2, 2014 |
| Johnnys WEST | Vivid | Johnny's Entertainment, Japan | Songwriter | October 8, 2014 |
| KAT-TUN | My Secret | Johnny's Entertainment, Japan | Songwriter | June 4, 2014 |
| Kim Hyun-joong | Hot Sun | Universal, Japan | Producer, Songwriter, Keyboards, Programming | June 18, 2014 |
| Kim Hyun-joong | B.I.N.G.O | Universal, Japan | Producer, Songwriter, Keyboards, Programming | June 18, 2014 |
| Kim Hyun-joong | Good-Bye | Universal, Japan | Producer, Songwriter, Guitar, Programming | June 18, 2014 |
| Shinee | Lucky Star | EMI Japan | Songwriter | June 25, 2014 |
| Bee Shuffle | Boom Boom Crazy | Digital Adventure Japan | Producer, Songwriter, Keyboards, Programming | July 9, 2014 |
| ABC-Z | 僕らのこたえ～Here We Go～ | Johnny's Entertainment, Japan | Producer, Songwriter, Keyboards | July 9, 2014 |
| BoA | Masayume Chasing | Avex Japan | Producer, Songwriter, Keyboards, Programming | July 23, 2014 |
| Yamashita Tomohisa | Mysterious | Johnny's Entertainment, Japan | Songwriter | August 20, 2014 |
| TVXQ | OVER | Avex Trax, Japan | Songwriter | August 27, 2014 |
| Da-iCE | ハッシュ ハッシュ (Hush Hush) | Universal, Japan | Songwriter | August 27, 2014 |
| Shinee | Downtown Baby | EMI Japan | Producer, Songwriter, Keyboards, Programming | September 24, 2014 |
| Shinee | Picasso | EMI Japan | Songwriter | September 24, 2014 |
| Sexy Zone | It's Going Down | Johnny's Entertainment, Japan | Songwriter | October 1, 2014 |
| Johnnys WEST | Can't Stop | Johnny's Entertainment, Japan | Songwriter | October 8, 2014 |
| Anna Tsuchiya | Lucifer | Avex Trax, Japan | Songwriter | October 22, 2014 |
| Arashi | Tell Me Why | Johnny's Entertainment, Japan | Songwriter | October 22, 2014 |
| ZhouMi | Without You | SM Entertainment, Korea | Songwriter | October 31, 2014 |
| Giselle 4 | Love-A-Dub | Universal, Japan | Songwriter | November 5, 2014 |
| Lena Katina (t.A.T.u) | Something I Said | Lena Katina | Producer, Songwriter, Programming, Keyboards | November 18, 2014 |
| Taeyeon | Rescue Me | SM Entertainment, Korea | Producer | November 2, 2017 |

== Selected discography (CDs, DVDs, performances and TV shows) ==
| Album / Name | Artist(s) | Label | Role/Credit | Date | Chart# |
|---|---|---|---|---|---|
| Rainbow Mini Album | Enomoto Atsuko | Avex, Japan | Songwriter | September 15, 2004 | - |
| Summary of Johnny's World | NEWS, KAT-TUN & Johnny's Jr | Johnny's Entertainment, Japan | Songwriter, Lyricist | April 19, 2005 | No.1 Oricon Japan DVD Chart Gold |
| Kaizokuban DVD | KAT-TUN | Johnny's Entertainment, Japan | Songwriter, Lyricist | May 3, 2005 | Gold Disc Award Japan "Best Music DVD of the Year" No.1 Oricon Japan DVD Chart / Platinum |
| Ajisai Ai Ai Monogatari | Biyuden | Up-front Works, Japan | Songwriter | May 25, 2005 | Top 10 Oricon Japan Single Chart |
| V-U-Densetsu | Biyuden | Up-front Works, Japan | Songwriter | August 17, 2005 | Top 10 Oricon Japan DVD Chart |
| W (Double You) | Miss Love Tantei | Up-front Works, Japan | Songwriter | September 7, 2005 | Top 10 Oricon Japan Single Chart |
| W (Double You) | Miss Love Tantei Music DVD (Single-V) | Up-front Works, Japan | Songwriter | September 14, 2005 | #1 Oricon Japan DVD Chart |
| TVXQ (Tohoshinki) | Rising Sun Album | SM Entertainment | Lyricist | September 14, 2005 | #1 Korea |
| SBS TV Animation "Origami Warriors" Ending Theme Song | TVXQ | SM Entertainment, Korea | Lyricist | September, 2005 | - |
| W (Double You) & Berryz Kobo | High Score DVD | Up-front Works, Japan | Songwriter | November 9, 2005 | #1 Oricon Japan DVD Chart |
| Hello Project | Petit Best6 | Up-front Works, Japan | Songwriter | December 21, 2005 | Top 20 Oricon Japan Album & DVD Chart |
| V-U-Densetsu II | Biyuden | Up-front Works, Japan | Songwriter | February 15, 2006 | #1 Oricon Japan DVD Chart |
| Best of KAT-TUN | KAT-TUN | Johnny's Entertainment, Japan | Songwriter, Lyricist | March 22, 2006 | Gold Disc Award 2006 "Best 10 Albums of the Year" |
| Farewell | Van Tomiko | Avex Trax, Japan | Songwriter, Lyricist | March 29, 2006 | Top 10 Oricon Japan Album Chart |
| Good Day! | V6 (Coming Century) | Johnny's Entertainment, Avex Trax, Japan | Songwriter | June 14, 2006 | #1 Oricon Single Chart / Gold |
| NHK TV Japan Animation "Samurai 7" Opening Theme Song | Coming Century | Johnny's Entertainment, Avex Trax, Japan | Songwriter | June 2006 | - |
| Yeah! Album "Fly Away" | Park Jung Ah | Star Empire / CJ Music, Korea | Publisher | August 25, 2006 | Top 5 Album Korea |
| Bokunopagewomekureba (僕の頁をめくれば) | Park Yong Ha | Pony Canyon, Japan | Songwriter, Lyricist | January 1, 2007 | #2 Oricon Single Chart |
| Yong Ha's Melody | Park Yong Ha | Pony Canyon, Japan | Songwriter | March 21, 2007 | Top 40 Oricon Japan Album Chart |
| Johnny's Jr. Odaiba Con 07 | Johnny's Jr | Johnny's Entertainment, Japan | Songwriter, Lyricist | July, 2007 | - |
| Live of KAT-TUN "Real Face" DVD | KAT-TUN | Johnny's Entertainment, Japan | Songwriter, Lyricist | April 11, 2007 | #1 Oricon Japan DVD Chart / Platinum |
| Horizon | Field of view Yuya Asaoka | Tokuma Communication, Japan | Songwriter | April 25, 2007 | |
| Johnny's Jr. Hey Say 07 in Yokohama Arena Con | Hey! Say! 7 | Johnny's Entertainment, Japan | Songwriter | September, 2007 | - |
| Dream Boys DVD | Kazuya Kamenashi & Koki Tanaka | Johnny's Entertainment, Japan | Songwriter, Lyricist | February 27, 2008 | #3 Oricon Japan DVD Chart |
| V-U-Densetsu IV | Biyuden | Up-Front Works, Japan | Songwriter | September 17, 2008 | #6 Oricon Japan DVD Chart |
| Ultra Music Power | Hey! Say! JUMP | Johnny's Entertainment, Japan | Songwriter | November 14, 2007 | #1 Oricon Japan Sincle Chart / Platinum |
| Ikinari in Tokyo Dome DVD | Hey! Say! JUMP | Johnny's Entertainment, Japan | Songwriter | April 30, 2008 | #1 Oricon Japan DVD Chart / Gold |
| Hey! Say! JUMP Spring Con 08 | Hey! Say! JUMP | Johnny's Entertainment, Japan | Producer, Songwriter, Lyricist, Arranger, Engineer | February, 2008 | - |
| One! History of Tackey Musical DVD | Hideaki Takizawa (Tackey & Tsubasa) | Johnny's Entertainment, Japan | Songwriter, Lyricist | January 23, 2008 | #1 Oricon Japan DVD Chart |
| Queen of Pirates | KAT-TUN | Johnny's Entertainment, Japan | Producer, Songwriter, Arranger, Engineer | April 30, 2008 | #1 Oricon Japan Album Chart / Platinum |
| Summary of Johnny's World 2008 | Hey! Say! JUMP | Johnny's Entertainment, Japan | Producer, Songwriter, Lyricist, Engineer | June 30, 2008 | - |
| Nanaseno hi (Day of Nanase) | Aikawa Nanase | Avex Trax, Japan | Songwriter | July 7, 2008 | - |
| Kansai Jr. Con 08 | Johnny's Jr | Johnny's Entertainment, Japan | Songwriter, Lyricist | August 20, 2008 | - |
| First Concert of KIS-MY-FT2 & A.B.C.-Z in Yokohama Arena | Johnny's Jr | Johnny's Entertainment, Japan | Songwriter | September, 2008 | - |
| Rainism | Rain | J-Tune Entertainment, Korea | Audio Production Director | October 15, 2008 | #1 Album Korea |
| SS501 Special Album - U R Man | SS501 | DSP Entertainment, Korea | Lyricist, Vocal Director | November 24, 2008 | #1 Album Korea |
| KAT-TUN Live Tour 2008 Queen of Pirates DVD | KAT-TUN | Johnny's Entertainment, Japan | Producer, Songwriter, Arranger | January 1, 2009 | #1 Oricon Japan DVD Chart / Gold |
| REBORN | Aikawa Nanase | Avex Trax, Japan | Songwriter | February 19, 2009 | - |
| BOYS ARE BACK - Japan Premium | US5 | NBC Entertainment, Japan | Songwriter | February 9, 2009 | Top 20 Germany |
| The 3rd Album - Sorry, Sorry | Super Junior | SM Entertainment, Korea | Songwriter | March 13, 2009 | #1 Album of the Year |
| 2009 Spring Concert Hey! Say! 7 | Hey! Say! 7 | Johnny's Entertainment, Japan | Songwriter | March, 2009 | - |
| Break the Records - by you & for you | KAT-TUN | Johnny's Entertainment, Japan | Songwriter | April 29, 2009 | #1 Oricon Japan Album Chart / Platinum |
| Hey! Say! JUMPTour '08-'09 DVD | Hey! Say! JUMP | Johnny's Entertainment, Japan | Producer, Songwriter, Lyricist | April 29, 2009 | #1 Oricon Japan DVD Chart / GOLD |
| PLAYZONE 2009 Musical | KIS-MY-FT2 | Johnny's Entertainment, Japan | Songwriter, Lyricist | July, 2009 | - |
| Hey! Say! JUMP Summer Con Ten Goku | Hey! Say! JUMP | Johnny's Entertainment, Japan | Songwriter, Lyricist | July, 2009 | |
| Wheesung 6th Album, Vocolate | Wheesung | Popup Entertainment, Korea | Producer, Songwriter, Keyboard, Programmer | October 10, 2009 | Top 5 Album Korea |
| SS501 Mini Album, Rebirth | SS501 | DSP Entertainment, Korea | Album Producer | October 20, 2009 | #1 Korea Single Chart |
| F(x) 1st Single, Chu~ | F(x) | SM Entertainment, Korea | Publishing | November 9, 2009 | Top 5 Album Korea |
| Playzone 2009 DVD | Kis-my-ft2 | Johnny's Entertainment, Japan | Songwriter | December 2, 2009 | #1 Oricon Japan DVD Chart |
| Live Break the Records | KAT-TUN | Johnny's Entertainment, Japan | Songwriter | December 16, 2009 | #1 Oricon Japan DVD Chart / GOLD |
| She Loves Me (Musical) | Yabu Kota (Hey! Say! JUMP) | Johnny's Entertainment, Japan | Songwriter | December 29, 2009 | - |
| Back to the Basic | Rain | J-Tune Entertainment, Korea | Audio Production Director | April 1, 2010 | #1 Korea Album Chart |
| H-Logic | Lee Hyori | M-Net Media, Korea | Publishing | April 14, 2010 | #1 Korea Album Chart |
| SS501 Mini Album, Destination | SS501 | DSP Entertainment, Korea | Producer, Songwriter | May 24, 2010 | #1 Korea Single Chart |
| No More Pain | KAT-TUN | Johnny's Entertainment, Japan | Songwriter, Producer, Keyboard & programming | June 16, 2010 | #1 Oricon Japan Album Chart / Platinum |
| JUMP NO.1 | Hey! Say! JUMP | Johnny's Entertainment, Japan | Songwriter | July 7, 2010 | #1 Oricon Japan Album Chart / Platinum |
| The 2nd Album - Lucifer | Shinee | SM Entertainment, Korea | Producer, Songwriter, Keyboard, Programming, Publishing | July 19, 2010 | #1 Album Korea |
| Superstar (Digital Single) | 4Minute | Mnet, Korea | Publishing | July 19, 2010 | Mnet TV "Superstar K" Theme song |
| Dekotomo DX TV CM | KAT-TUN | Johnny's Entertainment, Japan | Songwriter, Producer, Keyboard & programming | July 2010 | Japanese cellphone「デコとも★DX」 TV commercial |
| 훗 (Hoot) 3rd Mini Album | 소녀시대, [Girls' Generation(少女時代)] | SM Entertainment, Korea | Publishing | October 27, 2010 | #1 Album Korea |
| ｢ありがとう｣～世界のどこにいても～ | Hey! Say! JUMP | Johnny's Entertainment, Japan | Producer, Songwriter, Keyboards, Programming | December 15, 2010 | #1 Oricon Japan / Gold |
| No More Pain - World Big Tour DVD | KAT-TUN | Johnny's Entertainment, Japan | Producer, Songwriter, Keyboard & programming | December 2010 | #1 Oricon Japan Album Chart / Gold |
| SUMMARY 2010 DVD | Hey! Say! JUMP | Johnny's Entertainment, Japan | Songwriter | January 2011 | #1 Oricon Japan DVD Chart |
| Rainbow the 2nd Mini Album | Rainbow | DSP Entertainment, Korea | Producer, Songwriter, Vocal Director | April 7, 2011 | Top 5 Album Korea |
| Let It Go | Heo Young Saeng (허영생) | B2M Entertainment, Korea | Producer, Songwriter, Keyboards, Programming, Vocal Director | May 12, 2011 | #1 Album Korea |
| Break Down | Kim Hyun Joong (김현중) | Keyeast, Korea | Producer, Songwriter, Keyboards, Guitar, Programming, Chorus, Vocal Director | June 8, 2011 | #1 Korea Single/Album, Platinum Taiwan/#1 Japan Oricon International |
| 新春 滝沢革命 (Takizawa Revolution) | Takizawa Hideaki | Johnny's Entertainment, Japan | Producer, Songwriter, Composer, Keyboards, Programming | June 8, 2011 | #1 Oricon DVD Japan |
| More Than A Game | Ian Thomas | Universal Belgium | Songwriter | July, 2011 | #8 Album Belgium |
| Everybody Go | Kis-My-Ft2 | Johnny's Entertainment, Japan | Songwriter, Producer, Keyboards, Programming | August 10, 2011 | #1 Oricon Single Chart / Platinum |
| Symdrome (1st Single) | Chocolat | Paramount, Korea | Publishing | August 17, 2011 | - |
| 1st Solo Story DVD | Heo Young Saeng (허영생) | B2M Entertainment, Korea | Songwriter, Producer, Keyboards, Programming, Vocal Director | September 28, 2011 | - |
| Lucky | Kim Hyun Joong (김현중) | Keyeast, Korea | Producer, Songwriter, Keyboards, Programming, Vocal Director | October 11, 2011 | #1 Korea Single/Album/ #1 Japan Oricon International |
| Kis-My-Ftに逢えるde Show vol.3 | Kis-My-Ft2 | Johnny's Entertainment, Japan | Songwriter | October 26, 2011 | #2 Oricon Japan DVD Chart / Gold |
| Everybody Go at 横浜アリーナ | Kis-My-Ft2 | Johnny's Entertainment, Japan | Producer, Songwriter, Keyboards, Programming | October 26, 2011 | #1 Oricon Japan DVD Chart / Gold |
| The Boys 3rd Album | 소녀시대, [Girls' Generation(少女時代)] | SM Entertainment, Korea | Publishing | October 19, 2011 | #1 Album Korea, #2 Album Japan |
| The First | SHINee | EMI Japan | Producer, Songwriter, Keyboard, Programming, Publishing | December 7, 2011 | #4 Oricon Japan, GOLD |
| The 1st Mini Album 'I Like It' | Chocolat | Paramount, Korea | Publishing | December 15, 2011 | - |
| Marry Me / Marry You | Kim Hyun Joong (김현중) | Keyeast, Korea | Producer, Songwriterr, Keyboards, Programming, Director | December 15, 2011 | - |
| Kiss Kiss / Lucky Guy (1st Japanese Single) | Kim Hyun Joong (김현중) | Universal, Japan | Producer, Songwriter, Keyboards, Programming, Director | January 25, 2012 | #2 Oricon Japan, GOLD |
| J. Burney | ジェイ・バーニー | Urbanville, Japan | Producer, Songwriter | Feb 25, 2012 | iTunes Japan Top 30 |
| Summary 2011 in Done | Hey! Say! JUMP | Johnny's Entertainment, Japan | Producer, Songwriter, Keyboards, Programming | December 15, 2011 | #1 Oricon DVD Japan |
| Deucer | イ・ジュンギ | IMX, Japan | Producer, Songwriter, Keyboards, Programming, Mix, Mastering | March 16, 2012 | Top10 Japan |
| Kis-My-1st | Kis-My-Ft2 | Johnny's Entertainment, Japan | Producer, Songwriter, Keyboards, Programming | March 28, 2012 | #1 Oricon Japan Album Chart / Platinum |
| 너밖에 몰라서 Digital Single | A-Jax | DSP Entertainment, Korea | Producer, Songwriter, Keyboards, Programming, Vocal Director | May, 2012 | Top 10 Korea |
| SOLO | Heo Young Saeng (허영생) | B2M Entertainment, Korea | Producer, Songwriter, Keyboards, Programming, Vocal Director | May 22, 2012 | Top 5 Album Korea |
| ONE 4 U Digital Single | A-Jax | DSP Entertainment, Korea | Producer, Songwriter, Keyboards, Programming, Vocal Director | June 1, 2012 | - |
| Jump World | Hey! Say! JUMP | Johnny's Entertainment, Japan | Producer, Songwriter, Keyboards, Programming | June 6, 2012 | #1 Oricon Japan Album Chart / Gold |
| Kis-My-Mint | Kis-My-Ft2 | Johnny's Entertainment, Japan | Producer, Songwriter, Keyboards, Programming | June 26, 2012 | #1 Oricon Japan DVD Chart / Gold |
| Kiss Kiss / Lucky Guy (1st Japanese Single) | Kim Hyun Joong (김현중) | Universal, Japan | Producer, Songwriter, Keyboards, Programming | July 4, 2012 | #1 Oricon Japan, GOLD |
| Coming Back! in Japan | イ・ジュンギ | IMX, Japan | Producer, Songwriter, Keyboards, Programming | July 7, 2012 | Top10 DVD Japan |
| Hot Game Digital Single | A-Jax | DSP Entertainment, Korea | Producer, Songwriter, Vocal Director | July 12, 2012 | Top 20 Korea |
| ABC-Z and Sexy Zone ~ Summary | Sexy Zone | Johnny's Entertainment, Japan | Songwriter | August 18, 2012 | - |
| Overjoyed | Heo Young Saeng (허영생) | Pony Canyon, Japan | Producer, Songwriter, Keyboards, Programming | September 19, 2012 | - |
| 1st Japanese Album | B1A4 | Pony Canyon, Japan | Producer, Songwriter, Keyboards, Programming | October 24, 2012 | Top5 Album Japan |
| 2nd Japanese Single | A-Jax | Universal, Japan | Producer, Songwriter | October 31, 2012 | - |
| Jump World 2012 | Hey! Say! JUMP | Johnny's Entertainment, Japan | Producer, Songwriter, Keyboards, Programming | November 7, 2012 | #1 Oricon Japan DVD Chart |
| 1st Album one SEXY Zone | Sexy Zone | Johnny's Entertainment, Japan | Songwriter | November 14, 2012 | #1 Oricon Japan Album Chart / Gold |
| 1st Mini Album "2MYX" | A-Jax | DSP Entertainment, Korea | Producer, Songwriter, Keyboards, Programming | November 15, 2012 | - |
| The First Tour DVD | Shinee | EMI Japan | Producer, Songwriter, Keyboard, Programming, Publishing | December 12, 2012 | - |
| Unlimited | Kim Hyun Joong | Universal Japan | Producer, Songwriter, Keyboard, Programming | December 12, 2012 | #3 Oricon Japan Album Chart / GOLD |
| 1000年、ずっとそばにいて… | Shinee | EMI Japan | Producer, Songwriter, Keyboard, Programming | December 12, 2012 | #3 Oricon Japan Single Chart |
| Johnny's Dome Theatre ~ Summary 2012~ | Sexy Zone | Johnny's Entertainment, Japan | Songwriter | Feb 13, 2012 | #1 Oricon Japan Blu-ray Chart / #2 DVD Chart |
| JG Style | イ・ジュンギ | IMX, Japan | Producer, Songwriter, Keyboards, Programming | Feb 14, 2013 | |
| Over joyed Concert DVD | Heo Young Saeng (허영생) | Pony Canyon, Japan | Producer, Songwriter, Keyboards, Programming | Feb 22, 2013 | |
| 10th Single | F.T.Island | Warner Music, Japan | Producer, Songwriter, Arranger, Keyboards, Programming | Mar 27, 2013 | #5 Oricon Japan Single Chart |
| 2nd Album | Kis-My-Ft2 | Johnny's Entertainment, Japan | Producer, Songwriter, Keyboards, Programming | Mar 27, 2013 | #1 Oricon Japan Album Chart / Platinum |
| Boys Meet U | Shinee | EMI Japan | Producer, Songwriter, Keyboard, Programming | June 26, 2013 | #2 Oricon Japan Album Chart |
| Come On A My House | Hey! Say! JUMP | Johnny's Entertainment, Japan | Songwriter | June 26, 2013 | #1 Oricon Japan Single Chart / Gold |
| Feel | Namie Amuro | Avex, Japan | Producer, Songwriter, Keyboards & programming, Mix | July 10, 2013 | #1 Oricon Japan Album Chart / Platinum |
| Round 3 | Kim Hyun Joong | KeyEast, Korea | Producer, Songwriter, Director, Keyboard, Programming, Percussions | July 22, 2013 | #1 in Billboard World Chart / #1 in 8 countries in Asia |
| XOXO | Exo | SM Entertainment, Koea | Producer, Songwriter | August 4, 2013 | #1 Selling Album of the Year Korea |
| 8th Single | Kis-My-Ft2 | Johnny's Entertainment, Japan | Producer, Songwriter, Keyboards, Programming | August 14, 2013 | #1 Oricon Japan Single Chart / Platinum |
| The Single Collection | F.T.Island | Warner Music, Japan | Producer, Songwriter, Arranger, Keyboards, Programming | September 8, 2013 | Top 10 Album Japan |
| Neonlight Lipstick (Digital Single) | Namie Amuro | Avex, Japan | Producer, Songwriter, Keyboards & programming | October 9, 2013 | #1 Japan Single Download Chart |
| Jump Tour 2013 DVD | Hey! Say! JUMP | Johnny's Entertainment, Japan | Producer, Songwriter, Keyboards & programming | November 13, 2013 | #1 Oricon Japan DVD Chart |
| 1st Mini Album Kusabi | KAT-TUN | Johnny's Entertainment, Japan | Producer, Songwriter, Keyboards & programming | November 27, 2013 | #1 Oricon Japan Album Chart / Gold |
| 3rd Album Love & Peace | 소녀시대, [Girls' Generation(少女時代)] | Universal, Japan | Songwriter | December 11, 2013 | #1 Oricon Japan Album Chart / Gold |
| Tsuki | Namie Amuro | Avex, Japan | Producer, Songwriter, Keyboards & programming | January 29, 2014 | #3 Oricon Japan Single Chart |
| Snow Dome no yakusoku DVD | Kis-My-Ft2 | Johnny's Entertainment, Japan | Producer, Songwriter, Keyboards, Programming | January 29, 2014 | #1 Oricon Japan DVD Chart / Gold |
| Sexy Second | Sexy Zone | Johnny's Entertainment, Japan | Songwriter | Feb 19, 2014 | #1 Oricon Japan Album Chart / Gold |
| Feel Tour DVD/Blu-ray | Namie Amuro | Avex, Japan | Producer, Songwriter, Keyboards & programming | Feb 26, 2014 | #1 Oricon DVD/Blu-ray Chart / Gold |
| TVXQ (Tohoshinki) | Tree | Avex Trax, Japan | Producer, Songwriter | March 5, 2014 | #2 World Chart / #1 Oricon Japan Album Chart / Platinum |
| Nakayama Yuma | High Five | Johnny's Entertainment, Japan | Songwriter | April 2, 2014 | #3 Oricon Japan Single Chart |
| Japan Arena Tour Shinee World 2013: Boys Meet U DVD | Shinee | EMI Japan | Producer, Songwriter, Keyboard, Programming | April 2, 2014 | #2 Oricon Japan DVD Chart |
| Come On! Come On! (Digital Single) | The United | Farm Records, Japan | Producer, Songwriter, Keyboard, Programming, Mix | April 2, 2014 | #1 FM Radio Chart (Japan) |
| Countdown 2013 | KAT-TUN | Johnny's Entertainment, Japan | Producer, Songwriter, Keyboards & programming | May 14, 2014 | #1 Oricon Japan DVD Chart |
| In Fact | KAT-TUN | Johnny's Entertainment, Japan | Songwriter, Keyboards | June 4, 2014 | #1 Oricon Japan Single Chart, GOLD |
| Hot Sun | Kim Hyun Joong | Universal, Japan | Producer, Songwriter, Director, Keyboard, Guitar, Programming | June 18, 2014 | #1 Oricon Japan Single Chart, GOLD |
| Lucky Star | Shinee | EMI Japan | Songwriter | June 25, 2014 | #3 Oricon Japan Single Chart |
| グイグイグイ↑↑↑ | Bee Shuffle | Digital Adventure, Japan | Producer, Songwriter, Keyboard, Programming | July 9, 2014 | #5 Oricon Japan Single Chart |
| Legend Story | A.B.C-Z | Johnny's Entertainment, Japan | Producer, Songwriter, Keyboard | July 9, 2014 | #1 Oricon Japan DVD Chart |
| Masayume Chasing | BoA | Avex, Japan | Producer, Songwriter, Keyboard, Programming | July 23, 2014 | Top 10 Japan |
| Timing | Kim Hyun Joong | KeyEast, Korea | Album Producer | July 11, 2014 | #1 Album Korea |
| The Best | Girls' Generation | Universal, Japan | Songwriter | July 23, 2014 | #1 Oricon Japan |
| Spring Tour Sexy Second | Sexy Zone | Johnny's Entertainment, Japan | Songwriter | August 12, 2014 | #1 Oricon Japan DVD Chart |
| Mini Album "Asobi" | Yamashita Tomohisa | Warner Music, Japan | Songwriter | August 20, 2014 | #2 Oricon Japan |
| Tree Live Tour 2014 | TVXQ (Tohoshinki) | Avex Trax, Japan | Producer, Songwriter | August 27, 2014 | #1 Oricon Japan DVD Chart |
| ハッシュ ハッシュ | Da-iCE | Universal, Japan | Producer, Songwriter | August 27, 2014 | #3 Oricon Japan Single Chart |
| Who's Back? | BoA | Avex, Japan | Producer, Songwriter, Keyboard, Programming | September 3, 2014 | Top 10 Album, Japan |
| Best Collection Vol.1 | SS501 | Pony Canyon, Japan | Producer, Songwriter, Keyboard, Programming, Chorus | September 3, 2014 | Top 10 Album, Japan |
| 男never give up | Sexy Zone | Johnny's Entertainment, Japan | Songwriter | October 1, 2014 | - |
| I'm Your Boy | Shinee | EMI Japan | Producer, Songwriter, Keyboards, Programming | September 24, 2014 | #1 Album Oricon Japan |
| Fight Back | Da-iCE | Universal, Japan | Producer, Songwriter | October 15, 2014 | #3 Album Oricon Japan |
| Lucifer | Anna Tsuchiya | AVEX, Japan | Songwriter | October 22, 2014 | - |
| The Digitalian | Arashi | Johnny's Entertainment, Japan | Songwriter | October 22, 2014 | #1 Album Oricon Japan |
| Rewind | ZhouMi | SM Entertainment, Korea | Songwriter | October 31, 2014 | - |
| Love-A-Dub | Giselle4 | Universal, Japan | Songwriter | November 5, 2014 | - |
| This Is Who I Am | Lena Katina | Katina Music Inc, USA | Producer, Songwriter, Keyboard, Programming | November 18, 2014 | - |

== Produced Albums (Album Producer) ==
- SS501 Mini Album "Rebirth" - #1 Single ("Love Like This") & Album in Korea, Platinum in Taiwan
- SS501 Mini Album "De5tination" - #1 Single ("Love Ya") & Album in Korea, Platinum in Taiwan
- Kim Hyun Joong Mini Album "Break Down" - #1 Single ("Break Down") & Album in Korea, Platinum in Taiwan
- Kim Hyun Joong Mini Album "Lucky" - #1 Single ("Lucky Guy") & Album in Korea, Platinum in Taiwan
- Kim Hyun Joong Digital Single "Please"
- Kim Hyun Joong Digital Single "Marry Me"
- A-Jax Digital Single "One 4 U"
- A-Jax Digital Single "Hot Game"
- A-Jax Mini Album "2MYX"
- Kim Hyun Joong 1st Japanese Single Kiss Kiss/Lucky Guy - #2 Japan, Gold Certified
- Kim Hyun Joong 2nd Japanese Single Heat - #1 in Japan, Gold Certified
- Kim Hyun Joong 1st Japanese Album "Unlimited" - #1 in Japan, Gold Certified
- Heo Young Saeng 1st Mini Album "Let It Go" - #2 Album in Korea
- Heo Young Saeng 2nd Mini Album "Solo" - Top 10 Album in Korea
- Kim Hyun Joong 1st Live DVD/Blu-ray "1st Impact" - #1 DVD in Japan
- Kim Hyun Joong 3rd Japanese Single "Tonight" - #2 in Japan, Gold Certified
- Kim Hyun Joong Mini Album "Round 3" - #1 Album in Korea, #1 Billboards World Album Chart
- Kim Hyun Joong 2nd Live DVD/Blu-ray "Tonight Premium Live"
- Kim Hyun Joong Mini Album "Timing" - #1 Album in Korea
