= Lucky Guy =

Lucky Guy may refer to:

- Lucky Guy (play), a 2013 Broadway play by Nora Ephron; her final work
- Lucky Guy (musical), a 2011 Off Broadway musical comedy by Willard Beckham
- "Lucky Guy" (Dieter Bohlen song), a 1985 song by Modern Talking from The 1st Album
- "Lucky Guy" (Kim Hyun-joong song), 2012
- The Lucky Guy, a 1998 Hong Kong comedy film
