= Overjoyed (Heo Young-saeng album) =

2012 studio album by Heo Young-saeng

- "Normal edition" cover

Studio album by Heo Young-saeng
- Released: September 19, 2012
- Recorded: W Sound; Sweetune
- Genre: J-pop
- Length: 42:55
- Label: Pony Canyon Japan
- Producers: B2M Entertainment; Mitsuo Shimano (Pony Canyon Japan)

Heo Young-saeng chronology
Overjoyed (2012)	Memories To You (2013)

Music video
- "1.2.3" on YouTube

Overjoyed is a studio album by Heo Young-saeng. His first album to be produced for a Japanese audience, it was released by Pony Canyon on September 19, 2012. The full-length album consists of eleven tracks, including Japanese versions of three songs originally sung in Korean. Heo has also released a DVD titled Heo Young Saeng Concert 2012 – Overjoyed which was recorded live. The album entered the Oricon Albums Charts at number 29.

== Background and development ==
After debuting as a solo artist with the release of Let It Go in 2011, Heo Young-saeng focused on his career in South Korea. However, in the same year he stayed in Japan for a couple of weeks for his debut musical performance in The Three Musketeers. Heo later released his second minialbum in South Korea on May 22, 2012. Titled Solo, it peaked at number 4 on the Gaon Weekly Album Charts.

Later that year, Heo announced he would be releasing an album in Japan. Known for his gentle, ballad-like songs, Overjoyed would mark a change in his genre by leaning towards rock. Heo previously mentioned that he enjoyed light rock music, but did not have the chance to include it in his last album. He had only performed a rock adaptation of "Find" during SS501's Persona concert in 2008.

On August 19, 2012, Pony Canyon announced in commemoration of Overjoyed that Heo would perform at the Shibuya-AX, Tokyo, on September 22, and at Zepp Namba, Osaka, on September 24. These events would include a talk show immediately following the concerts in celebration of the album's release. A month afterward, Pony Canyon uploaded a 45-second teaser of Heo's lead track "1.2.3" on YouTube, on September 17. In addition, a launch exhibition was held from September 18 to 24 at Tower Records Shibuya's lounge to promote the album.

== Release and promotion ==
Four months after the release of his mini-album in South Korea, Heo released Overjoyed on September 19, 2012. His first full-length Japanese studio album, it entered the Oricon Albums Charts at number 29 on the first week of its release. In the same week, Pony Canyon uploaded a four-minute music video of "1.2.3" on YouTube. Following the release of the album, Heo made his first live performance in Japan; 1st Solo Concert in Japan was held two days after the release of Overjoyed. Held from September 22 and 24, Heo sang numerous songs from Overjoyed, as well as the rock version of "Find" and a medley of SS501 songs.

A talk show was held after the concert; borrowing from the lead track, 123 people from the audience who had purchased the album were invited on the show. When asked how "1.2.3" was written and produced, Heo expressed his admiration of Avril Lavigne and how she inspired his music, stating: "The lead track was created as an upbeat, rock song, letting the listeners to be able to enjoy and dance with it. In part, it was also chosen because I wanted to do a song similar to [Lavigne's] musical genre". (Note: Paraphrased from the Japanese language: 「盛り上がることができて楽しめて、笑えるような曲をやりたかったので。アヴリル・ラヴィーンさんのようなジャンルの曲をいつかやりたいと思っていて、それが叶ったのが"1.2.3"という曲です」)

== Track listing ==
"Normal edition"
No.	Title	Lyrics	Music	Arrangement	Length
1.	"DraMagic!"	Shoko Fujibayashi	David Amber, Amanda Droste	David Amber, Amanda Droste	03:44
2.	"Vacation"	MEG.ME	Steven Lee, Mark Smith, Daniel Nitt	Steven Lee, Mark Smith	03:44
3.	"1.2.3"	Goro Matsui	Anthony Mazza, Shida Kaviani	Joey Carbone, Anthony Mazza	03:45
4.	"Beautiful"	kenko-p	Paul Drew, Greig Watts, Pete Barringer	Paul Drew, Greig Watts, Pete Barringer	04:54
5.	"True Tears"	Goro Matsui	Kim Won	Kim Won	03:48
6.	"Crying" (Japanese version)	Japanese: Shoko Fujibayashi; Original: Heo Young-saeng, Kim Tae-wan	Steven Lee	Steven Lee	04:11
7.	"Let It Go" (Japanese version)	Japanese: Shoko Fujibayashi; Original: Han Jae-ho, Song Soo-yoon	Han Jae-ho, Kim Seung-soo	Han Jae-ho, Kim Seung-soo, Hong Seung-hyun	03:22
8.	"Dream On"	Goro Matsui	Fredrik Samsson, Mai, Stefan Ekstedt, Magnus Sjölander	Kazuhiko Meda	04:15
9.	"とぎれた夜をつないで (Connect The Broken Night)"	Goro Matsui	Aren Chen, David Yao	Joey Carbone, Anthony Mazza	04:41
10.	"Timeless Love"	Shoko Fujibayashi	Paul Drew, Greig Watts, Pete Barringer	Paul Drew, Greig Watts, Pete Barringer	04:25
11.	"Hello Mello" (Japanese version)	Japanese: MEG.ME; Original: Lee Seung-jae	Steven Lee	Akiyuki Tateyama	04:06
Total length:					42:55

"Limited edition" DVD
No.	Title	Length
1.	"1.2.3" (MV + Making Of)

== Music videos ==
- "1.2.3"

== Release history ==
Country	Date	Label	Format
Japan	September 19, 2012	Pony Canyon	CD ("normal edition")
Japan	September 19, 2012	Pony Canyon	CD and DVD ("limited edition")

== DVD ==
Heo Young Saeng Concert 2012 – Overjoyed
- Heo Young-saeng's DVD cover

Video by Heo Young-saeng
- Released: February 20, 2013
- Recorded: 2012
- Genre: J-pop
- Length: 120 minutes
- Label: Pony Canyon Japan

Heo Young Saeng Concert 2012 – Overjoyed is the fifth DVD by South Korean solo male artist, Heo Young-saeng. The two-disc live DVD was released the next year on February 20, 2013. It features his performance at Shibuya-AX Osaka on September 22, 2012, and a photobook. The DVD album peaked at 43 at the Oricon DVD Charts.

=== Track listing ===
- Disc 1:
1. "1.2.3"
2. "DraMagic!"
3. "Let It Go"
4. "Crying"
5. "イルムオムヌンキオック"
6. "Find" (Rock ver.)
7. "Intimidated"
8. "Out The Club"
9. "True Tears"
10. "とぎれた夜をつないで"
11. "Maria"
12. "Love Ya"
13. SS501 medley ("Kokoro" / "Distance~君とのキョリ" / "LIVE!" / "LUCKY DAYS")
14. "All My Love"
15. "Beautiful"
16. "Dream On"
17. "Hello Mello"
- Bonus disc 2:
1. Talk show and after-sales
2. Making and shooting of Overjoyed jacket

== Charts ==
Chart	Country	Peak
Oricon Weekly Albums Chart	Japan	29
Oricon DVD Chart	Japan	43
