= Kiss Kiss Kiss =

Kiss Kiss Kiss may refer to:

- "Kiss Kiss Kiss" (Ami Suzuki song), 2009
- "Kiss Kiss Kiss" (Beni song), 2009
- "Kiss! Kiss! Kiss!" (Buono song), 2008
- "Kiss Kiss Kiss" (KAT-TUN song), 2015
- "Kiss Kiss Kiss" (Yoko Ono song), 1980
- Kiss Kiss Kiss, a group that performed at the Montreux Jazz Festival 2010
- Kiss×Kiss×Kiss, a Japanese web drama starring Saaya Irie

== See also ==
- Kiss (disambiguation)
- Kiss Kiss (disambiguation)
