= Kiss Kiss =

Kiss Kiss may refer to:

== Books ==
- Kiss Kiss (book), a collection of short stories by Roald Dahl

== Music ==
- Kiss Kiss (band), an American indie rock band
- Kiss Kiss (Japanese group), a Japanese girl group
- "Kiss Kiss" (Chris Brown song)
- "Kiss Kiss" (Kim Hyun-joong song)
- "Kiss Kiss" (Ladies' Code song)
- "Kiss Kiss" (Madeline Merlo song)
- "Kiss Kiss", a song by Machine Gun Kelly from Tickets to My Downfall
- "Kiss Kiss", a song by Prince Royce from Soy el Mismo
- "Kiss, Kiss", a song by Yeah Yeah Yeahs from Is Is
- "Şımarık", or "Kiss Kiss", a Turkish-language song by Tarkan covered by Stella Soleil and Holly Valance

== See also ==
- Kiss (disambiguation)
- Kiss Kiss Bang Bang (disambiguation)
- Kiss Kiss Kiss (disambiguation)
- Kiss x Kiss, a manga series by Chitose Yagami
- Kiss-Kiss, a brand of candy produced by Fazer
- "Doctor Kiss Kiss", a song by 5000 Volts
