= Unlimited (Kim Hyun-joong album) =

- Normal Edition cover

Studio album by Kim Hyun-joong
- Released: December 12, 2012
- Genre: J-pop
- Label: Delicious Deli Records; Universal Music Japan
- Producer: Steven Lee

Kim Hyun-joong chronology
| Unlimited (2012) | Imademo (2015) |

Singles from Unlimited
- 1. "Kiss Kiss / Lucky Guy" Released: January 25, 2012; 2. "Heat" Released: July 4, 2012

Unlimited is Kim Hyun-joong's first full Japanese length studio album. It was released on December 12, 2012 and consists of 14 tracks, including most of his songs from his previous two Japanese singles KISS KISS / Lucky Guy and HEAT. The album was created in different versions – the Normal version with the original 14 songs and two Limited editions, which include a DVD, each featuring a different music video and its making of.

On November 27, Universal Music Japan released an album teaser video on their official YouTube channel, which includes a preview of the music video for "Your Story". "Your Story" was released as digital download on December 5, a week ahead of the release of the album.

== Track listing ==
=== Normal Edition ===
| No. | Title | Lyrics | Music | Arrangement | Length |
|---|---|---|---|---|---|
| 1. | "Save Today" | Steven Lee, Sean Alexander, Jimmy Richard | Steven Lee, Sean Alexander, Jimmy Richard | Kim Sun-il (DAYBREAK), Alex (DOWNHELL), Yang Hye-seung (PIA) | 03:59 |
| 2. | "Let's Party" | Kim Ji-hyang | Steven Lee, Jimmy Richard | Steven Lee | 03:41 |
| 3. | "U" (Jap. Ver.) | Rina Moon | Steven Lee, Drew R. Scott | Steven Lee | 03:37 |
| 4. | "Kiss Kiss" (Jap. Ver.) | Rina Moon | Steven Lee, Drew R. Scott, Sean Alexander | Steven Lee | 03:44 |
| 5. | "I'm Yours" | Steven Lee, Jimmy Richard, TC Carter | Steven Lee, Jimmy Richard, TC Carter | Steven Lee | 03:24 |
| 6. | "Your Story" | Steven Lee, Jimmy Richard, Rina Moon | Steven Lee, Jimmy Richard | Kim Sun-il (DAYBREAK) | 04:23 |
| 7. | "僕は君のもの" (I'm Your Man) (Jap. Ver.) | | Kim Chang-rock | Kim Chang-rock | 04:19 |
| 8. | "Marry You" (Jap. Ver.) | | Steven Lee, Yannis Constantinou, Kim Bergseth | | 03:43 |
| 9. | "Lucky Guy" (Jap. Ver.) | Rina Moon | Steven Lee | Steven Lee | 03:43 |
| 10. | "Break Down (Ft. Double K)" (Jap. Ver.) | Rina Moon | Steven Lee | Steven Lee | 03:31 |
| 11. | "Heat" | Koshi Inaba | Tak Matsumoto | Hideyuki Terachi | 04:05 |
| 12. | "Your Story" (Inst.) | | | | 04:24 |
| 13. | "Save Today" (Inst.) | | | | 03:58 |
| 14. | "I'm Yours" (Inst.) | | | | 03:24 |

=== Limited Editions A and B ===
| No. | Title | Lyrics | Music | Arrangement | Length |
|---|---|---|---|---|---|
| 1. | "Save Today" | Steven Lee, Sean Alexander, Jimmy Richard | Steven Lee, Sean Alexander, Jimmy Richard | Kim Sun-il (DAYBREAK), Alex (DOWNHELL), Yang Hye-seung (PIA) | 03:59 |
| 2. | "Let's Party" | Kim Ji-hyang | Steven Lee, Jimmy Richard | Steven Lee | 03:41 |
| 3. | "U" (Jap. Ver.) | Rina Moon | Steven Lee, Drew R. Scott | Steven Lee | 03:37 |
| 4. | "Kiss Kiss" (Jap. Ver.) | Rina Moon | Steven Lee, Drew R. Scott, Sean Alexander | Steven Lee | 03:44 |
| 5. | "I'm Yours" | Steven Lee, Jimmy Richard, TC Carter | Steven Lee, Jimmy Richard, TC Carter | Steven Lee | 03:24 |
| 6. | "Your Story" | Steven Lee, Jimmy Richard, Rina Moon | Steven Lee, Jimmy Richard | Kim Sun-il (DAYBREAK) | 04:23 |
| 7. | "僕は君のもの" (I'm Your Man) (Jap. Ver.) | | Kim Chang-rock | Kim Chang-rock | 04:19 |
| 8. | "Marry Me" (Jap. Ver.) | | Steven Lee, Yannis Constantinou, Kim Bergseth | | 03:43 |
| 9. | "Lucky Guy" (Jap. Ver.) | Rina Moon | Steven Lee | Steven Lee | 03:43 |
| 10. | "Break Down (Ft. Double K)" (Jap. Ver.) | Rina Moon | Steven Lee | Steven Lee | 03:31 |
| 11. | "Heat" | Koshi Inaba | Tak Matsumoto | Hideyuki Terachi | 04:05 |
| 12. | "Your Story" (Inst.) | | | | 04:24 |
| 13. | "Save Today" (Inst.) | | | | 03:58 |
| 14. | "I'm Yours" (Inst.) | | | | 03:24 |

Jacket A, Limited Edition: DVD
| No. | Title | Length |
|---|---|---|
| 1. | "Your Story" (MV + Making Of) |

Jacket B, Limited Edition: DVD
| No. | Title | Length |
|---|---|---|
| 1. | "Save Today" (MV + Making Of) |

== Music videos ==
- "Your Story"
- "Save Today"
- "Let's Party"

== Release history ==
| Country | Date | Label | Format |
|---|---|---|---|
| Japan | December 12, 2012 | Delicious Deli Records | CD (Normal Edition) |
| Japan | December 12, 2012 | Delicious Deli Records | CD+DVD (Limited Edition A) |
| Japan | December 12, 2012 | Delicious Deli Records | CD+DVD (Limited Edition B) |

== Charts ==
| Chart | Country | Period | Peak |
|---|---|---|---|
| Oricon Daily Album Chart | Japan | December 11, 2012 | #1 |
| Oricon Weekly Album Chart | Japan | December 10–16, 2012 | #3 |
| Oricon Western Album Chart | Japan | December 10–16, 2012 | #1 |
| Oricon Yearly Album Chart | Japan | 2013 | #79 |
