= Heat (Kim Hyun-joong song) =

"HEAT"
- Jacket E, Normal Edition cover

Single by Kim Hyun-joong

from the album Unlimited
- Released: July 4, 2012
- Genre: J-pop, Pop rock
- Label: Delicious Deli Records; Universal Music Japan
- Songwriters: Koshi Inaba and Tak Matsumoto (B'z)
- Producers: Steven Lee; Taewan a.k.a. C-Luv

Kim Hyun-joong singles chronology
"Kiss Kiss / Lucky Guy" (2012)	"HEAT" (2012)	"Tonight" (2013)

HEAT is Kim Hyun-joong's second Japanese single. There are five available versions of this single, three of which include the song "Let's Party" in addition to the CD's title track "Heat".

For "Heat" Kim Hyun-joong collaborated with Japanese rock duo B'z.

Although there are music videos for both, "Heat" and "Let's Party", the latter song was not promoted on TV programs.

The songs will be featured on Kim Hyun-joong's upcoming Japanese album Unlimited.

Heat reached #31 on Oricon's Yearly Single Chart, having sold 202,672 copies.

== Track listing ==
=== Jackets A, B (both Limited Editions) and E (Normal Edition) ===
CD
No.	Title	Lyrics	Music	Arrangement	Length
1.	"Heat"	Koshi Inaba	Tak Matsumoto		04:10
2.	"Let's Party"	Kim Ji-hyang	Steven Lee, Jimmy Richard	Steven Lee	03:46
3.	"Heat" (TV Mix)		Tak Matsumoto		04:10
4.	"Let's Party" (TV Mix)		Steven Lee, Jimmy Richard	Steven Lee	03:43

Jacket A (Ltd. Ed.): Bonus DVD
No.	Title	Length
1.	"Heat MV"

Jacket B (Ltd. Ed.): Bonus DVD
No.	Title	Length
1.	"Let's Party MV"

=== Jackets C and D (both Limited Editions) ===
CD
No.	Title	Lyrics	Music	Length
1.	"Heat"	Koshi Inaba	Tak Matsumoto	04:10
2.	"Heat" (TV Mix)		Tak Matsumoto	04:10

== Music videos ==
- "Heat"
- "Let's Party"

== Release history ==
Country	Date	Label	Format
Japan	July 4, 2012	Delicious Deli Records	CD (Normal Edition)
Japan	July 4, 2012	Delicious Deli Records	CD+DVD (Limited Edition A)
Japan	July 4, 2012	Delicious Deli Records	CD+DVD (Limited Edition B)
Japan	July 4, 2012	Delicious Deli Records	CD (Limited Edition C)
Japan	July 4, 2012	Delicious Deli Records	CD (Limited Edition D)

== Promotion ==
=== TV programs ===
- NHK Music Japan: "Heat" (2012/7/1)
- Fuji TV Non Stop: "Heat" (2012/7/4)
- NTV Happy Music: "Heat" (2012/7/6)
- Fuji TV Hey! Hey! Hey! Music Champ: "Heat" (2012/8/20)

=== Guerilla performances ===
- Tokyo (Odaiba Diver City): "Let's Party" (2012/7/4)
- Nagoya (Sunshine Sakae, Central Park, Oasis 21): "Let's Party" (2012/7/8)

== Charts ==
Chart	Country	Period	Peak
Oricon Weekly Single Chart	Japan	Week of July 2–8	#1
Oricon Monthly Single Chart	Japan	July 2012	#3
Oricon Yearly Single Chart	Japan	2012	#31
Five Music J-Pop/K-Pop Chart	Taiwan	Week 29 (July 13–19)	#2
G-Music Combo Chart	Taiwan	Week 28 (July 13–19)	#7
G-Music J-Pop Chart	Taiwan	Week 28 (July 13–19)	#2
