= Let It Go (EP) =

- Let It Go cover

EP by Heo Young-saeng
- Released: May 12, 2011
- Genre: K-pop, R&B, Dance
- Length: 17:36
- Language: Korean
- Label: LOEN Entertainment; Warner Music Taiwan
- Producer: B2M Entertainment

Heo Young-saeng chronology
Let It Go (2011)	Solo (2012)

Music video
- "Let It Go" on YouTube "Rainy Heart" on YouTube

Let It Go is the solo mini album debut of South Korean singer Heo Young-saeng of boy band SS501. The EP of Korean-language songs was released on May 12, 2011 under B2M Entertainment and distributed by LOEN Entertainment. The album was released in Taiwan on July 1, 2011 under Warner Music Taiwan.

== Background and development ==
Heo Young-saeng left SS501's former agency, DSP Media, in mid-2010 and signed with B2M Entertainment in October 2010, together with bandmate Kim Kyu-jong, to embark on his solo career. Both singers then held a joint fan meeting called Kyu Jong & Young Saeng Story In Seoul on December 4, which continued in Hong Kong, Japan, and other countries in Asia. During this tour, they both mentioned their plans to release their respective solo albums the following year.

Following Park Jung-min and Kim Hyung-jun of SS501, Heo was the third to debut as a solo artist after leaving his former agency in 2010. In April, B2M Entertainment announced that Heo's album release would be delayed due to an injury he sustained on his right hand during a dance practice. His plan to officially debut on April 28 and appear in his first solo performance on Mnet's M Countdown the same day was also postponed. Similarly, he appeared on SBS' Running Man only briefly instead of guest-starring on the show on May 8, 2011.

While still recovering from his injury, Heo decided to release a mini album on May 12. On May 4, B2M uploaded a 25-second music video teaser of Heo's upcoming title track, "Let It Go", on YouTube. A photo teaser was also released, showing a pale-colored image of Heo wearing a white polo shirt and black tie, using a motion blur to give the impression of movement.

== Release and promotion ==
"There is no success if you settle for stereotypes (in music genre)" — Heo Young-saeng (Note: Based on the Korean language: "고정관념에 안주하면 성공은 없다")

On May 12, 2011, one week after the music video teaser release, Heo Young-saeng officially released his debut solo mini album, Let It Go. A 3-minute, 47-second music video of his dance song "Let It Go" was uploaded on YouTube the same day. Heo personally chose the mid-tempo dance song "Let It Go" as the title track for his debut album. As the main vocalist of SS501, he mostly sings ballads, and wanted to challenge himself and try new genres. The title track features Hyuna's rap, but new artist Park Ju-hyun (who was later revealed to be debuting as a Spica member under the same agency) was the one who appeared in the official music video and who performed Hyuna's rap parts on stage during Heo's live performances. Production costs for the music video, which filmed in Namyangju, reportedly reached USD$100,000.

Heo began promoting the album in South Korea right after its release. He did his first live performance on May 13 on KBS' Music Bank, followed by a May 19 appearance on Mnet's M Countdown, singing the tracks "Let It Go" and "Out The Club". He continued his promotional tour in South Korea until his last live performance on June 17 on KBS' Music Bank, in which he experienced a technical difficulty with his microphone in the beginning of his performance. A week later, he uploaded the 3-minute, 41-second music video of "Rainy Heart" on YouTube.

During this time, Heo signed with Warner Music Taiwan, along with Kim Hyun-joong, another SS501 band member who had recently debuted as a solo artist with the release of Break Down. Heo then scheduled promotional tours in Taiwan with the release of his mini album in that country under the Warner label. He also appeared in Japan in November alongside Kim Kyu-jong, who released a solo mini-album debut titled Turn Me On in September. Both Heo and Kim performed their respective songs on Mnet Japan's JJ Studio, accompanied by Kim Tae-woo.

== Chart performance ==
Let It Go peaked at number one on Gaon Album Chart during the first week of its release, starting on May 8, 2011, and reached 45th on Gaon Yearly Album Charts for 2011.

The "Let It Go" single landed at number 31 on Gaon Single Chart during the first week of its release, starting on May 8, and rose to 19th place in its second week. The single remained among the top 100 singles for nine weeks.

== Tracks ==
The album contains four songs and an instrumental version of the title track, "Let It Go". Produced by the Sweetune team, the album features rap by Hyuna of girl group 4Minute, Tae Wan, and Kim Kyu-jong of SS501. The mid-tempo dance track, which describes men's and women's different feelings, is composed by SweetTune's team and written by Song Soo-yoon. The other three songs, including the fast-paced "Out The Club" and "I'm Broken", and the R&B track "Rainy Heart", were written by Heo.

=== Track listing ===
No.	Title	Lyrics	Music	Length
1.	"Out The Club" (Ft. Tae Wan)	Heo Young-saeng (Korean lyrics)	Steven Lee, Drew Ryan Scott, Sean Alexander	3:22
2.	"Let It Go" (Ft. Hyuna)	Song Soo-yoon	Han Jae-ho, Kim Seung-soo	3:20
3.	"Rainy Heart" (Ft. Kim Kyu-jong)	Heo Young-saeng	Steven Lee	3:46
4.	"I'm Broken"	Song Soo-yoon, Heo Young-saeng (Korean lyrics)	Steven Lee, Sean Alexander, Jimmy Burney, John Ho	3:50
5.	"Let It Go" (Instrumental)			3:18
Total length:				17:36

Taiwan CD+DVD Edition: Bonus DVD
No.	Title	Length
1.	"Talk Time"
2.	"Speed Quiz"

== Music videos ==
- "Let It Go"
- "Rainy Heart"

== Release history ==
Country	Date	Distributing label	Format
Worldwide	May 12, 2011	B2M Entertainment	Digital download
South Korea	May 12, 2011	B2M Entertainment; LOEN Entertainment	CD
Taiwan	July 1, 2011	Warner Music Taiwan	CD
Taiwan	July 1, 2011	Warner Music Taiwan	CD+DVD

== Charts ==
Album charts

Chart	Country	Peak position	Notes/Ref
Gaon Weekly Album Chart	South Korea	1	
Gaon Monthly Album Chart	South Korea	3	24,079 copies
Gaon Yearly Chart	South Korea	45	32,078 copies
G-Music Combo Chart	Taiwan	5	2.8% sales
G-Music J-Pop/K-Pop Chart	Taiwan	2	10.49% sales
Five Music J-Pop/K-Pop Chart	Taiwan	3	6.04% sales

Singles charts

Chart	Country	Peak position	Notes/Ref
Gaon Weekly Singles Chart	South Korea	19	"Let It Go"
Gaon Weekly Download Chart	South Korea	21	"Let It Go"
Gaon Monthly Singles Chart	South Korea	38	"Let It Go"
