= Destination (EP) =

- Rebith album cover - normal edition

EP by SS501
- Released: May 24, 2010
- Genre: K-pop, R&B, Dance
- Length: 22:51
- Language: Korean
- Label: DSP Media
- Producer: Steven Lee

SS501 chronology
| Rebirth (2009) | Destination (2010) | Set it Off (2026) |

Music video
- "Love Ya" on YouTube "Let Me Be The One" on YouTube

Destination is South Korean boy band SS501's eight Korean mini-album released on May 24, 2010 by DSP Media. This was also their last mini-album before their contract's expiration.

After wrapping up their 1st Asia Tour Persona, SS501 made preparations for their new mini-album Destination right away. Once again, they collaborated with American producers Steven Lee and Ken Lewis who worked on their Rebirth album, as well as Grammy-winning mix engineer Kevin KD Davis, producing another world-class pop album with four new songs.

The lead track, "Love Ya" was composed by Steven Lee, a grand and emotional mid-tempo song with heavy beats, accompanied by an orchestra and blended with a piano melody. The album also features the R&B track "Let Me Be The One", the dance song "Crazy 4 U" which was first heard and performed during their tour, and the Eurobeat-style pop track "Forever" written by Heo Young-saeng.

Their first win for the lead track, "Love Ya", was on KBS's Music Bank, on June 11. On June 18, DSP announced that SS501 would end their "Love Ya" promotions due to the expiration of their contract on June 7, 2010, five years after since their debut.

== Track listing ==
| No. | Title | Lyrics | Music | Arrangement | Length |
|---|---|---|---|---|---|
| 1. | "Let Me Be The One (그게 나라고..)" | Lee Seung-jae | Steven Lee, Sean Alexander, Andre Mieux | Steven Lee, Sean Alexander, Andre Mieux | 04:03 |
| 2. | "Love Ya" | Lee Seung-jae | Steven Lee | Steven Lee | 03:23 |
| 3. | "Crazy 4 U" | Lee Seung-jae | Steven Lee | Steven Lee | 03:41 |
| 4. | "영원토록" (Until Forever) | Heo Young-saeng | Freakchild, Christian Weber, Paul Drew, Greig Watts, Pete Barringer | Paul Drew, Greig Watts, Pete Barringer | 04:56 |
| 5. | "Let Me Be The One (그게 나라고..)" (Acoustic Ver.) | Lee Seung-jae | Steven Lee, Sean Alexander, Andre Mieux | Steven Lee | 04:05 |
| 6. | "Love Ya" (Inst.) | | Steven Lee | Steven Lee | 03:23 |
| Total length: | | | | | 22:51 |

Japan version Limited Edition - DVD
| No. | Title | Length |
|---|---|---|
| 1. | "Love Ya" (music video) |
| 2. | "Let Me Be The One" (music video) |

Taiwan version Limited Edition Version B+SS501 file folder B+5 Photocards
| No. | Title | Length |
|---|---|---|
| 1. | "Love Ya" (music video) |
| 2. | "Love Ya" (music video teaser) |

== Music videos ==
- "Love Ya"
- "Let Me Be The One"

== Release history ==
| Country | Date | Distributing label | Format |
|---|---|---|---|
| South Korea | May 24, 2010 | DSP Media | CD |
| South Korea | June 2010 | DSP Media | CD + Photobook |
| Japan | August 2010 | DSP Media | Limited Edition CD+DVD |
| Taiwan | June 2010 | DSP Media | Limited Edition Version A |
| Taiwan | June 2010 | DSP Media | Limited Edition Version B |

== Charts ==
| Country | Chart | Peak position | Ref |
|---|---|---|---|
| South Korea | Gaon Weekly Chart | 1 | |
