= Round 3 =

Kim Hyun-joong's third Korean mini-album

- Round 3 album cover

EP by Kim Hyun-joong
- Released: July 22, 2013
- Genre: K-pop
- Language: Korean
- Label: KeyEast
- Producer: Steven Lee

Kim Hyun-joong chronology
Lucky (2011)	Round 3 (2013)	Timing (2014)

Music video
- "Unbreakable" on YouTube
- "Your Story" on YouTube

Round 3 is Kim Hyun-joong's third Korean mini-album, which was released on July 22, 2013.

== Background and development ==
Two days after the "2013 KHJ Show - Party People" fanmeeting in Seoul, Korea, KeyEast stated that Kim would be releasing his third mini-album Round 3 on July 22. Before its release, they pre-released three photo teasers: the first photo teaser shows his back muscles with Korean traditional pattern tattoos, the second photo teaser shows his intense gaze downwards with a tattoo on his neck, and finally the third photo teaser shows him staring at the camera with intense gaze, but the focus is on his torso, which is covered with a clearer tattoo, particularly a Korean goblin, emphasizing the mix of tradition and modern sounds. Jay Park and Dok2 participated in the lyric-making as well as featuring in the songs "Unbreakable" and "Your Story" respectively. In addition, both songs were created by Steven Lee, who produced Kim's previous Korean and Japanese albums. Also, "Unbreakable" was choreographed by Lyle Beniga and directed by Hong Won-ki, while "Your Story" was choreographed by Keone Madrid and directed by Jo Soo-hyun.

== Release and promotion ==
On July 15, KeyEast announced that Kim Hyun Joong's new song and music video "Unbreakable" would be released on July 18 at 12 noon prior to the release of the album. Four days later, the "Your Story" MV teaser was released on July 22, together with its other tracks.

== Track listing ==
No.	Title	Lyrics	Music	Arrangement	Length
1.	"Unbreakable (ft. Jay Park)"	Lee Seung Jae, Jay Park	Steven Lee, Goldfingerz, Drew Ryan Scott	Steven Lee, Goldfingerz	3:26
2.	"Your Story (ft. Dok2)"	Dok2	Steven Lee, Drew Ryan Scott	Steven Lee	3:57
3.	"예전처럼" (As Before)		Gen Rubin, Jean T. Na, Mary J. Blige		4:09
4.	"Gentleman"	Jeanie	Marli Harwood, Kasper Larsen, Ole Brodersen, Rasmus Thude		3:12
5.	"I'm Yours"		Steven Lee, Drew Ryan Scott, TC Carter	Steven Lee	3:29
6.	"Let's Party"	Kim Ji Hyang	Steven Lee, Drew Ryan Scott	Steven Lee	3:45
Total length:					22:41

== Music videos ==
- Unbreakable (ft. Jay Park)
- Your Story (ft. Dok2)

== Release history ==
Country	Date	Distributing label	Format
South Korea	July 22, 2013	KeyEast; CJ E&M MUSIC	Digital download

== Charts ==
Chart	Country	Period	Peak position	Notes
Hanteo Weekly Charts	South Korea	12–18 August 2013	4	
Gaon Single Chart	South Korea	21–27 July 2013	14	"Your Story"
Gaon Weekly Album Chart	South Korea	28 July - 3 August 2013	2	
Gaon Monthly Album Chart	South Korea	July 2013	8	56,152
Gaon Monthly Album Chart	South Korea	August 2013	6	103,383
Gaon Monthly Album Chart	South Korea	September 2013	15	113,204
Gaon Yearly Charts	South Korea	2013	20	111,776
Billboard World Album Charts	Global	4–10 August 2013	1	
Oricon Imported Album Charts	Japan	21 August	1	
