= Memories to You =

2013 album by Heo Young-saeng

Memories To You
- Memories To You (normal edition)

Studio album by Heo Young-saeng
- Released: July 3, 2013
- Genre: J-pop
- Length: 43:26
- Label: Pony Canyon

Heo Young-saeng chronology
| Overjoyed (2012) | Memories To You (2013) |

Memories To You is Heo Young-Saeng's second Japanese full-length studio album, which was released on July 3, 2013 under Pony Canyon Japan. It consists of mostly renditions of his and SS501 past songs but also includes two new songs, totaling to ten tracks.

== Background and development ==
After releasing and promoting his third mini album Life in South Korea, Heo Young-saeng left to Japan for his Summer Snow musical. From June until the end of May, he played the role of Tachibana Seiji, a young doctor who has a one-sided love to his patient, Katase Yuki. In May, B2M Entertainment announced Heo's plan to enlist by the end of 2013 for his mandatory military service in November. He was found to be fit for active duty by the Office of Military Manpower Administration after his check-up, and he was just waiting for his draft notice. Further information about his enlistment had not been decided yet.

In June, Heo announced that he will be releasing his second Japanese album, as well as his scheduled concert. Tickets were pre-released on May 27, together with "Summer Snow" musical ticket sales.

Most of the songs in the album are rearrangements and covers of his and SS501's former recorded songs as part of his "memories", as it is meant to be his parting gift for his Japanese fans before his enlistment. He stated: "I want to share the past memories with my fans, and that's also how the title came to be." (Note: Paraphrased from the Japanese language: 「ファンの皆さんと今までの想い出となる時間を共有したいと、ヨン セン自らが選曲し、タイトルを付けました」) The album consists of music covers that were recorded by SS501 in Japan including "All My Love", "Mermaid..." and "Again" (Japanese version), as well his first recorded solo song entitled "First Sky I've Ever Seen" from SS501's debut single in Japan, Kokoro, in 2007.

== Release and promotion ==
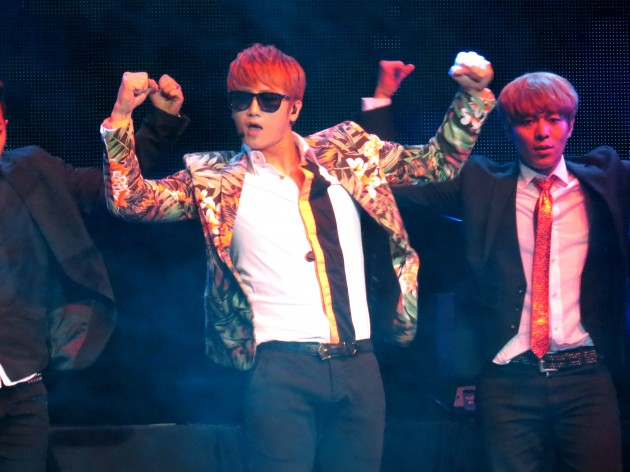
Heo Young-saeng performing during his fanmeeting held on August 20, 2013 at the Metropolitan Theatre in Mexico City.

Almost a year since his last Japanese album release, Heo Young Saeng released his second full-length Japanese studio album Memories To You on July 3, 2013. The album entered the Oricon Daily Charts at 13, and reached 31 at Oricon Albums Chart for the first week of its release.

Heo Young-saeng held a panel exhibition on July 2 to July 8, 2013 at Tower Records Shibuya to promote his album. He then appeared at Zepp Tokyo for his concert starting at 7pm entitled "Heo Young Saeng Concert 2013" on July 11, around ten months since his last Japanese stage appearance. He performed the tracks of his album, singing the tracks from his past solo albums first, and he later performed a SSS01 medley towards the end of the concert. Before performing SS501's 2007 a cappella song titled "All My Love", he said: "There are only two new songs included in the album because, instead, it is mostly full of memories that you can look back anytime," (Note: Paraphrased from the Japanese language: 「今回のアルバムにはもう一度歌いたい歌を収録しました。新曲は2曲だけですが、これまでの時間を振り返ることのできる想い出あふれるアルバムです」) pertaining to his past songs he recreated.

Starting on August 17, Heo had his first fanmeeting tour in South and Latin America together with co-member Park Jung-min. The tour originally consisted of four stops but B2M Entertainment later announced that Heo's fanmeeting in Saeng Quito, Ecuador and Arequipa, Peru on August 22 and August 24 respectively were cancelled due to lack of time and preparation. Fanmeetings in Lima, Peru and Mexico on August 17 and August 20, respectively, were held as originally planned, and an encore in Lima, Peru on August 24 was added later on.

Heo released his last album She on October 16 before enlisting on October 31, 2013 as a conscripted policeman.

== Track listing ==
| No. | Title | Lyrics | Music | {{{extra_column}}} | Length |
|---|---|---|---|---|---|
| 1. | "Always You and I" (いつでも僕は君といる) | Goro Matsui | Toshiaki Matsumoto | | 5:05 |
| 2. | "Starry Sky" (ホシゾラ (Hoshizora)) | Yoshiyasu Ichikawa (KABUKI) | Taichi Nakamura (KABUKI) | | 5:00 |
| 3. | "Mermaid…" | Asami Yamamoto | Taiyo Yamazawa | 武藤星児 | 4:36 |
| 4. | "Again" | Shin-U | Hwang Seong Je (BJJ) | | 3:47 |
| 5. | ""Is It Love?" acoustic ver." (愛なのでしょ) | Heo Young-saeng (Korean) | Heo Young-saeng | | 3:54 |
| 6. | "Connect the Broken Night 2013" (とぎれた夜をつないで 2013) | Goro Matsui | Aren Chen, David Yao | | 4:42 |
| 7. | "Dream On 2013" | Goro Matsui | Fredrik Samsson, 麻衣, Stefan Ekstedt, Magnus Sjolander | | 4:19 |
| 8. | "Everything You" | Matthew Gerrard, Kurt Schneider, Max Schneider, IkutaMachine | Matthew Gerrard, Kurt Schneider, Max Schneider, IkutaMachine | | 3:54 |
| 9. | "All My Love" | Goro Matsui | Atsushi Tago | | 4:29 |
| 10. | "First Sky I've Ever Seen memorial ver." (はじめて見る空だった (Hajimete Miru Sora Datta)) | Yuriko Mori | Hiroki Mizukami | | 5:00 |
| Total length: | | | | | 43:26 |

Limited Edition: Bonus DVD
| No. | Title | Length |
|---|---|---|
| 1. | "Making of video recording (includes photoshoot and more)" |

== Release history ==
| Country | Date | Label | Format |
|---|---|---|---|
| Japan | July 3, 2013 | Pony Canyon; B2M Entertainment | digital download |
| Japan | July 3, 2013 | Pony Canyon | CD |
| Japan | July 3, 2013 | Pony Canyon | CD+DVD (Limited Edition) |

== DVD ==
CONCERT 2013 – OMOIDE WO KIMI NI-JAPAN
- Heo Young-saeng's DVD cover

Video by Heo Young-saeng
- Released: January 29, 2014
- Recorded: 2013
- Genre: J-pop
- Length: 130 minutes
- Label: Pony Canyon Japan

CONCERT 2013 – OMOIDE WO KIMI NI-JAPAN is the sixth DVD by South Korean solo male artist, Heo Young-saeng. Following Heo's Japan concert three months ago, Heo announced on October 21, 2013 through his Japanese website that he will be releasing a DVD version of the same title with the said concert.

The two-disc live DVD was released the next year on January 29, 2014. It features his performance at Zepp Tokyo on July 11, 2013. The DVD album peaked at 43 at the Oricon DVD Charts.

=== Track listing ===
- Disc 1:
1. "INTRO"
2. "Let It Go"
3. "Crying"
4. "Rainy Heart"
5. "Intimidated"
6. "1.2.3"
7. "DraMagic!"
8. "The Art of Seduction"
9. "Know It All"
10. ."Hajimete Miru Sora Datta"
11. ."Is It Love?" acoustic ver.
12. "Mermaid..."
13. "Starry Sky"
14. "Because I'm Stupid"
15. "Find"
16. "SS501 medley"
17. "All My Love"
18. "Always You and I"
19. "Coward"
20. "Hello Mello"
- Disc 2:
1. Bonus video

== Charts ==
| Chart | Country | Peak |
|---|---|---|
| Oricon Albums Chart | Japan | 31 |
| Oricon DVD Charts | Japan | 43 |
