= Chocolat (group) =

South Korean girl group

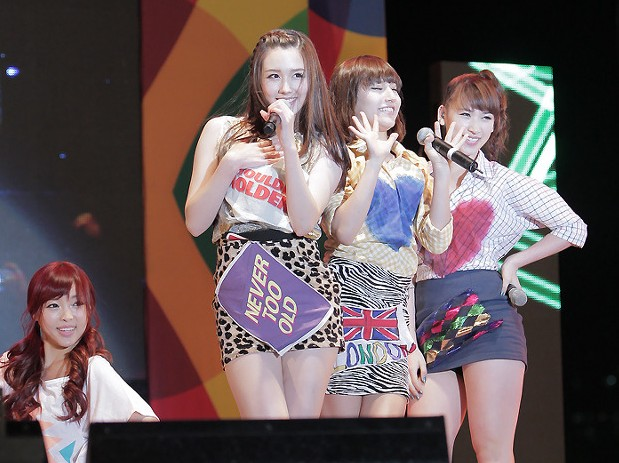
- Chocolat in 2011. Left to right: Min Soa, Tia, Melanie and Juliane (Jaeyoon not pictured).

Background information
- Origin: Seoul, South Korea
- Genres: K-pop; electropop; R&B
- Years active: 2011–2017
- Labels: HBO Music Entertainment; Warner Music
- Past members: Jaeyoon; Min Soa; Juliane; Tia; Melanie
- Website: cafe.daum.net/realchocolat

Chocolat (Korean: 쇼콜라), commonly stylized as ChoColat, was a South Korean girl group created by HBO Music in 2011. The group's name stems from the idea that each member is reminiscent of a different type of chocolate. The name of the group was initially going to be "Chocolate", but there was already a group with that name, so HBO Music decided to use the French word chocolat instead. The group consists of a total of five former members: Jaeyoon, Min Soa, Juliane, Tia and Melanie. The group became inactive in 2013. After four-year of hiatus with a little group activity, Melanie confirmed in an interview that the group members' contracts had concluded in February 2017 and the group had disbanded.

== Career ==
=== 2011: Debut and I Like It ===
On August 2, 2011, Chocolat was revealed to the public by Paramount Music as the first mixed race group to debut in South Korea. Prior to their debut, their music had been described as electronic club music, a mix of the disco of T-ara's "Roly-Poly" and the club sounds of 2NE1's "I Am The Best". They have also said their role models are from girl group 2NE1.

The song "I Like It" was brought to the group at the last-minute by the Paramount's president, thinking that it better represented the group's image. At this point, the band had already recorded seven songs and were rehearsing another song for their debut. At first, the song was not well-liked, but public reception made them more comfortable with it.

The music video for "Syndrome" was released on August 16, prior to the release of the digital single. Following the digital release of the single on August 17, Chocolat had their debut performance on Mnet's M! Countdown on August 18, 2011, later performing on August 19, 2011 on KBS Music Bank, on August 20, 2011 on MBC Music Core and finally a week later on SBS Inkigayo, on September 4, 2011. The song peaked at number 68 on the Gaon Weekly Digital Singles Chart and was written by British songwriter group DWB (Paul Drew, Greig Watts, Pete Barringer). Before the debut, the group also had a cameo in the film Mr. Idol as "Korea's best group".

Later in the year, it was revealed that the group would be returning with an extended play in December. Promotions for "I Like It" began on December 3, 2011 at the music show K-pop Con. Due to severe illness, member Jaeyoon was unable to attend recording sessions for the title track and therefore had to miss the "I Like It" promotional period altogether. The EP contains a total of five songs, including the title track "I Like It", which is work of Girls' Generation's Genie's songwriters Anne Judith Wik, Robin Jenssen, Ronny Svendsen and Nermin Harambašić. Writer team DWB, having previously composed their debut single, composed the EP's track "In a Heartbeat" (너만을 보고 너만을 그리는) and "World Domination" (싫어 싫어). The EP was released on December 15, 2011, including their title track "I Like It", an English version of the single, and three other tracks, likely to have been amongst the seven previously recorded songs the group had prior to debuting. The EP reached 63 on the Gaon Weekly Albums Chart, while the title track went to number 81 on the digital singles chart.

=== 2012: Endorsements and One More Day ===
On January 5, it was announced that Chocolat had been chosen as new models for NBA Korea. On January 21, through Twitter, member Tia announced that they wouldn't be going back home to celebrate the Korean New Year and would instead spend the holiday practicing for promotions for their follow-up single "One More Day". The track, from their I Like It EP, was penned by Korean-American songwriters Jenny Hyun and Jean T. Na, and was originally sung as a demo by Hyun and titled "Same Thing To Her". The first performance for "One More Day" was broadcast through KBS's Music Bank on February 3. The music video was then released on February 9, 2012, alongside the physical and digital single album, which included the title track, a B-side song titled "Get Up", as well as instrumentals of both songs. The music video shows the members performing a chair dance contrasting with the storyline involving the girls capturing the man who's deceived them and punishing him for what he's done. The single reached number 83 on the Gaon Weekly Digital Singles Chart.

=== 2013: "Black Tinkerbell" and Lori's introduction ===
On May 29, it was confirmed that Chocolat would be releasing new material in June. A week earlier the members had been reported to have been filming their upcoming music video for their comeback. The group has since been a four-membered unit, as their former main vocalist Jaeyoon continued her absence from activities. The new single, "Black Tinkerbell", is about the love of Peter Pan's fairy, Tinkerbell, who stays by his side although he has found a love of his own, Wendy. The track was composed by Kim Euisung, a member of the group Bring The Noiz, who was inspired to write the song for Chocolat after hearing people compare them to fairies. The song took almost two years to be written, and the recording took six months to be perfected. The single also includes a B-side, "All Night Long", composed by the DWB songwriting team.

On June 5, Chocolat performed a preview of "Black Tinkerbell" for the first time on Arirang TV's Afterschool Club. After a one-year-and-three-month hiatus, the group released the single and its music video on June 11, 2013 in South Korea. The first performance for "Black Tinkerbell" was broadcast through KBS's Music Show! Champion on June 13, followed by Music Bank on June 14. "Black Tinkerbell" reached number 81 on the Gaon charts.

In October 2013, through a radio program on Arirang Radio, Lori confirmed that she was officially the new member of the group. She had previously appeared as an actress (Wendy) in the MV for "Black Tinkerbell" and during her time as a trainee she was supposed to debut with ChoColat, but due to her studies and college conflicts she couldn't.

=== 2017: Tia’s departure and disbandment ===
After a four-year hiatus on February 3, 2017, Tia officially announced her departure from the group. On April 14, 2017, Melanie did an interview with the website 'Kpopalypse' when she confirmed that the groups' contracts had officially concluded as of February 2017 saying that "It was a long time coming. I mean a really long time coming, I wanna say maybe since the beginning of the group, I saw it coming". She also said that she has not kept in contact with Soa or Tia, but has contacted Juliane as they've gotten closer.

== Members ==
=== Former members ===
- Soa (소아) (2011-2017)
- Juliane (줄리앤) (2011-2017)
- Tia (티아) (2011-2017)
- Melanie (멜라니) (2011-2017)
- Jaeyoon (제윤) (2011)

=== Temporary member ===
- Lori Thomas (로리) (2013-2014) joined the group in October 2013.

== Discography ==
Chocolat discography
- Extended plays: 1
- Singles: 4
- Music videos: 3

=== Extended plays ===
Title	Details	Peak chart positions	Sales
Title	Details	KOR	Sales
I Like It	Released: December 15, 2011; Label: Warner Music; Format: CD, Digital download; Language: Korean and English; Track listing: 1. I Like It; 2. 하루만 더 (Same Thing to Her); 3. 싫어 싫어 (World Domination); 4. 너만을 보고 너만을 그리는 (In a Heartbeat); 5. I Like It (English Ver.)	22	KOR: 1,347+

=== Digital singles ===
Year	Title	Peak chart positions	Sales (Digital download)	Album
Year	Title	KOR Gaon	Sales (Digital download)	Album
2011	"Syndrome"	68	184,335+	ChoColat First Single Album
2011	"I Like It"	81	156,260+	I Like It, The First Mini-Album
2012	"One More Day"	83	113,873+	I Like It, The First Mini-Album
2013	"Black Tinkerbell"	81	50,350+	Third Single Album
"—" denotes releases that did not chart or were not released in that region.

=== Videography ===
Year	Music video	Length
2011	"Syndrome"	3:35
2012	"One More Day"	3:40
2013	"Black Tinkerbell"	3:30

== Filmography ==
- 2011: "Mr 아이돌 (Idol)" (cameo)

== Awards and nominations ==
Year	Event	Award	Nominated work	Result
2011	Seoul Success Awards	Rookie of the Year	Chocolat	Won
2011	MTV Best Of the Best	Hot Debut Star	Chocolat	Nominated
