= Kiss Kiss / Lucky Guy =

"KISS KISS / Lucky Guy"
- Normal Edition cover

Single by Kim Hyun-joong

from the album Unlimited
- Released: January 25, 2012
- Genre: J-pop
- Label: Delicious Deli Records; Universal Music Japan
- Songwriters: Kiss Kiss: Rina Moon, Steven Lee, Drew R. Scott, Sean Alexander; Lucky Guy: Rina Moon, Steven Lee
- Producer: Steven Lee

Kim Hyun-joong singles chronology
"Marry Me / Marry You" (2011)	"KISS KISS / Lucky Guy" (2012)	"Heat" (2012)

KISS KISS / Lucky Guy is Kim Hyun-joong's first Japanese single. It mostly consists of Japanese versions of previously released Korean songs from his mini albums Break Down and Lucky. The only original Japanese song is "Hohoemi No Chikara" (Japanese: ほほえみのちから), which is featured on one of the three available editions.

Kim Hyun-joong promoted "Kiss Kiss" (Japanese Ver.) on TV programs and released music videos for the aforementioned song and "Lucky Guy" (Japanese Ver.).

Some of the songs will be featured on Kim Hyun-joong's upcoming Japanese album Unlimited.

KISS KISS / Lucky Guy reached #61 on Oricon's Yearly Single Chart, having sold 121,547 copies.

== Track listing ==
=== Normal Edition ===
CD
No.	Title	Lyrics	Music	Arrangement	Length
1.	"Kiss Kiss" (Japanese Ver.)	Rina Moon	Steven Lee, Drew R. Scott, Sean Alexander	Steven Lee	03:45
2.	"Lucky Guy" (Japanese Ver.)	Rina Moon	Steven Lee	Steven Lee	03:21
3.	"Break Down [Ft. Double K]" (Japanese Ver.)	Rina Moon	Steven Lee	Steven Lee	03:32
4.	"ほほえみのちから" (Hohoemi No Chikara)	Tetsuya Komuro	Tetsuya Komuro	Kim Chang-rock	04:27
5.	"Kiss Kiss" (Japanese Ver.) (Instrumental)		Steven Lee, Drew R. Scott, Sean Alexander	Steven Lee	03:44
6.	"Lucky Guy" (Japanese Ver.) (Instrumental)		Steven Lee	Steven Lee	03:20
7.	"Break Down [Ft. Double K]" (Japanese Ver.) (Instrumental)		Steven Lee	Steven Lee

=== Limited Edition Type A ===
CD
No.	Title	Lyrics	Music	Arrangement	Length
1.	"Kiss Kiss" (Japanese Ver.)	Rina Moon	Steven Lee, Drew R. Scott, Sean Alexander	Steven Lee	03:45
2.	"Lucky Guy" (Japanese Ver.)	Rina Moon	Steven Lee	Steven Lee	03:21
3.	"U" (Japanese Ver.)	Rina Moon	Steven Lee, Drew R. Scott	Steven Lee	03:39
4.	"Kiss Kiss" (Japanese Ver.) (Instrumental)		Steven Lee, Drew R. Scott, Sean Alexander	Steven Lee	03:44
5.	"Lucky Guy" (Japanese Ver.) (Instrumental)		Steven Lee	Steven Lee	03:20
6.	"U" (Japanese Ver.) (Instrumental)		Steven Lee, Drew R. Scott	Steven Lee	03:39

DVD
No.	Title	Length
1.	"Kiss Kiss MV" (Japanese Ver.)
2.	"Kiss Kiss MV" (Korean Ver.)

=== Limited Edition Type B ===
CD
No.	Title	Lyrics	Music	Arrangement	Length
1.	"Kiss Kiss" (Japanese Ver.)	Rina Moon	Steven Lee, Drew R. Scott, Sean Alexander	Steven Lee	03:45
2.	"Lucky Guy" (Japanese Ver.)	Rina Moon	Steven Lee	Steven Lee	03:21
3.	"Break Down [Ft. Double K]" (Japanese Ver.)	Rina Moon	Steven Lee	Steven Lee	03:32
4.	"Kiss Kiss" (Japanese Ver.) (Instrumental)		Steven Lee, Drew R. Scott, Sean Alexander	Steven Lee	03:44
5.	"Lucky Guy" (Japanese Ver.) (Instrumental)		Steven Lee	Steven Lee	03:32
6.	"Break Down [Ft. Double K]" (Japanese Ver.) (Instrumental)		Steven Lee	Steven Lee	03:32

DVD
No.	Title	Length
1.	"Lucky Guy MV" (Korean Ver.)
2.	"Break Down MV" (Korean Ver.)

== Music videos ==
- "Kiss Kiss (Japanese Ver.)"
- "Lucky Guy (Japanese Ver.)"

== Release history ==
Country	Date	Label	Format
Japan	January 25, 2012	Delicious Deli Records	CD (Normal Edition)
Japan	January 25, 2012	Delicious Deli Records	CD+DVD (Limited Edition A)
Japan	January 25, 2012	Delicious Deli Records	CD+DVD (Limited Edition B)

== Promotion ==
=== TV programs ===
- TV Asahi Music Station: "Kiss Kiss" (2012/1/27)
- NHK Music Japan: "Kiss Kiss" (2012/1/29)

== Charts ==
Chart	Country	Period	Peak
Oricon Weekly Single Chart	Japan	Week of 2012-02-06	#2
Oricon Monthly Single Chart	Japan	January 2012	#4
Oricon Yearly Single Chart	Japan	2012	#61
G-Music J-Pop Chart	Taiwan	Week 8 (Feb. 24 - Mar. 1)	#5
