= Kisser (surname) =

Kisser is a German surname. Notable people with the surname include:

- Andreas Kisser (born 1968), Brazilian guitar player, songwriter, and producer

== See also ==
- Isser (name)
- Kiser
