= Solo (EP) =

SOLO
- Solo cover

EP by Heo Young-saeng
- Released: May 22, 2012
- Genre: K-pop, Medium pop, RnB
- Language: Korean
- Label: LOEN Entertainment; Warner Music Taiwan
- Producer: B2M Entertainment

Heo Young-saeng chronology
Let It Go (2011)	SOLO (2012)	Life (2013)

Music video
- "Crying" on YouTube

Solo (stylized as SOLO) is the second Korean EP of South Korean singer Heo Young-saeng. It was released on May 22, 2012 under B2M Entertainment and distributed by LOEN Entertainment The album was later released in Taiwan on August 24, 2012 under Warner Music Taiwan.

== Background and development ==
After the release of his debut solo album Let It Go in May 2011, Heo turned to acting. He made his musical debut in The Three Musketeers in November 2011 and made his first drama appearance on KBS's daily sitcom I Need A Fairy (or Sent From Heaven) in February 2012. He also contributed to that drama's original soundtrack with the release of "Love Song".

In the midst of the sitcom, B2M Entertainment started announcing Heo's upcoming album release via Twitter. It announced his comeback with the tweet: "He is Back D-DAY 13", and another one stating: "120522 YS 2nd mini album [SOLO] release...R U Ready??", accompanied by a photo of Heo. Both tweets were posted on May 9. B2M continued updating fans by posting image teasers of Heo Young-saeng on Twitter. A 31-second music video teaser was then uploaded on YouTube on May 17, showing Heo dancing and accompanied by snippets of the song.

Heo's agency announced that Heo had participated in the planning, concept, and production for the upcoming EP. His personal friend Steven Lee, who worked with SS501 to create songs such as "Love Ya" and "Love Like This" for their albums, produced four out of the five songs on SOLO.

== Release and promotion ==
"K-Pop these days is full of idols... but I think male solo singers are particularly rare. I want to work hard to strengthen male solo artists, and be a help to juniors preparing solo ventures. I want to be a sunbae that shows his juniors how to push forward." — Heo Young-saeng

SOLO was officially released on May 22, 2012. The four-minute and nine-second music video of the title track, "Crying", was uploaded to YouTube the same day. Filming of the music video took place overseas, using a helicopter camera to shoot the wide panorama.

The medium-tempo pop and R&B song "Crying" was composed by Steven Lee, with lyrics by Heo. The song describes a man's undying love for his past lover despite their broken relationship. Heo mentioned that he liked to do light rock music, but he did not have the chance to include it in the album.

Heo returned to the stage on KBS' Music Bank, performing "Crying" live on June 1. He performed the track on other South Korean weekly music programs, including SBS' Inkigayo and Mnet's M Countdown.

== Chart performance ==
The album peaked at number four on Gaon Album Chart during the first week of its release starting on May 20, 2012, and remained among the top 100 albums for two months. It eventually landed at 82 on the Gaon Yearly Album Charts for 2012. The single "Crying" landed at 39 on Gaon Single Chart for the first week of its release and ranked among the top 100 singles for two weeks.

== Track listing ==
No.	Title	Lyrics	Music	Arrangement	Length
1.	"Intimidated"	Kim Tae-wan	Brent Pascke, Gabe Lopez, Jimmy Richard	Tae Wan a.k.a. C-Luv	03:00
2.	"Crying" (크라잉; Keuraing)	Heo Young-saeng, Kim Tae-wan	Steven Lee	Steven Lee	04:09
3.	"Maria [눈물나무]"	Ha Won	Steven Lee	Steven Lee, Park Se-hyun	05:21
4.	"Hello Mello [Only Love]"	Lee Seung-jae	Steven Lee	Steven Lee	04:06
5.	"Crying" (Instrumental)		Steven Lee	Steven Lee	04:09

Taiwan CD+DVD Edition: Bonus DVD
No.	Title	Length
1.	"Crying MV"
2.	"Solo Teaser"
3.	"Exclusive footage"
4.	"A special visit"

== Music videos ==
- "Crying"

== Release history ==
Country	Date	Distributing label	Format
Worldwide	May 22, 2012	B2M Entertainment; LOEN Entertainment	Digital download
South Korea	May 22, 2012	B2M Entertainment; LOEN Entertainment	CD
Taiwan	August 24, 2012	Warner Music Taiwan	CD
Taiwan	August 24, 2012	Warner Music Taiwan	CD+DVD

== Charts ==
Album charts

Chart	Country	Peak position	Notes/Ref
Gaon Weekly Album Chart	South Korea	4	
Gaon Monthly Album Chart	South Korea	11	16,701 copies
Gaon Yearly Charts	South Korea	82	17,547
Five Music J-Pop/K-Pop Chart	Taiwan	11	1.61% sales
G-Music Combo Chart	Taiwan	20	0.46% sales

Single charts

Chart	Country	Peak position	Notes/Ref
Gaon Weekly Single Chart	South Korea	39	"Crying"
Gaon Weekly Download Chart	South Korea	35	"Crying" - 82,276
Gaon Weekly Streaming Chart	South Korea	56	"Crying" - 544,749
