= Lucky (Kim Hyun-joong EP) =

- Normal Edition cover

EP by Kim Hyun-joong
- Released: October 11, 2011
- Genre: K-pop, R&B, Dance
- Language: Korean
- Label: KeyEast (Korea); Warner Music Taiwan (Taiwan)
- Producer: Steven Lee

Kim Hyun-joong chronology
Break Down (2011)	Lucky (2011)	Round 3 (2013)

Music video
- "Lucky Guy" on YouTube

Lucky is the second Korean solo mini album of Kim Hyun-joong of South Korean boy band SS501. It was released on 11 October 2011 under KeyEast Entertainment. A Limited Edition was released on 14 November 2011. The album was released in Taiwan on 18 November 2011, by Warner Music Taiwan.

The album peaked at number one on Gaon Album Chart for the week starting on 9 June 2011 and debut at number five on Billboard's World Chart for the week of 29 October 2011. It also top the import albums category in Japan's Oricon weekly chart.

Kim promoted the album by performing the title track "Lucky Guy", for which he released a music video, and "Do You Like That".

== Track listing ==
No.	Title	Lyrics	Music	Arrangement	Length
1.	"Do You Like That"	Joy Factory, Kim Hyun-joong	Steven Lee, Drew R. Scott, Sean Alexander	Steven Lee, Drew R. Scott, Sean Alexander	2:17
2.	"Lucky Guy"	Kim Tae-wan, Kim Chang-rock	Steven Lee	Steven Lee	3:20
3.	"웃어요 (Smile)"	Lee Seung-jae	James Burney II, PK	James Burney II, PK	3:01
4.	"나는 네 남자야" (I'm Your Man)	Kim Chang-rock	Kim Chang-rock	Kim Chang-rock	4:18
5.	"U"	Joy Factory	Steven Lee, Drew R. Scott	Steven Lee	3:38
6.	"Lucky Guy" (Instrumental)		Steven Lee	Steven Lee	3:20

== Release history ==
Region	Date	Distributing label	Format
South Korea	11 October 2011	KeyEast	CD
South Korea	14 November 2011	KeyEast	Limited Edition
Taiwan	18 November 2011	Warner Music Taiwan	CD
Indonesia	18 December 2011	Warner Music Indonesia	CD

== Charts ==
Chart	Country	Period	Peak position	Notes/Ref
Gaon Single Chart	South Korea	9–15 October 2011	#24	"Lucky Guy"
Gaon Weekly Album Chart	South Korea	9–15 October 2011	#1	
Gaon Monthly Album Chart	South Korea	October	#2	94,784 copies
Gaon Yearly Chart	South Korea	2011	#10	101,705 copies
Billboard World Chart	USA	29 October - 4 November 2011	#5	
