= Break Down (EP) =

- Normal Edition cover

EP by Kim Hyun-joong
- Released: June 7, 2011
- Genre: K-pop, R&B, Dance
- Language: Korean
- Label: KeyEast (Korea); Warner Music Taiwan (Taiwan)
- Producer: Steven Lee

Kim Hyun-joong chronology
Break Down (2011)	Lucky (2011)

Music video
- "Break Down" on YouTube "Please" on YouTube "Kiss Kiss" on YouTube

Break Down is the debut Korean solo mini album of Kim Hyun-joong of South Korean boy band SS501. It was released on 7 June 2011 under KeyEast Entertainment. A Limited Edition was released on 23 June 2011, with a bonus DVD with music videos and behind-the-scene footages. The album was released in Taiwan by Warner Music Taiwan in two versions: Regular and Commemorate Editions.

== Background ==
Kim's songs were produced by Steven Lee, who had composed SS501's hits "Love Like This" and "Love Ya". The title track "Break Down" is a high energy dance track featuring Double K. Another track, "Please" is a R&B heavy second lead track.

== Promotions ==
For the album, Kim promoted the high tempo dance lead track "Break Down" featuring Double K, the R&B track "제발 (Please)" and the light tempo pop song "Kiss Kiss". He had also released music videos for these three songs.

== Reception ==
The album exceeded 70,000 pre-ordered copies in 10 days. It peaked at number one on Gaon Weekly Album Chart for the week starting 5 June 2011 and was the best-selling album for June on Gaon Monthly Album Chart with 100,433 sales. It also topped the Oricon chart in Japan in the International Imported Album category for the first week of July.

The album's title track "Break Down" was the first-place winner for two consecutive weeks on Mnet's M Countdown music show, for 16 and 23 June 2011; and also won for two consecutive weeks on KBS's Music Bank.

It is also certified platinum in Taiwan and Kim was presented with a platinum record by Warner Music Taiwan CEO Chen Ze Shan in a press conference held in Taiwan.

== Track listing ==
No.	Title	Lyrics	Music	Arrangement	Length
1.	"Intro (Let Me Go)"	Lee Seung-jae	Steven Lee	Steven Lee	1:43
2.	"Break Down [Ft. Double K]"	Joy Factory	Steven Lee	Steven Lee	3:31
3.	"제발 (Please)"	Joy Factory	Steven Lee, Drew R. Scott, Sean Alexander, Jimmy Burney, Greg Watton	Steven Lee	3:31
4.	"Kiss Kiss"	Lee Seung-jae	Steven Lee, Drew R. Scott, Sean Alexander	Steven Lee	3:44
5.	"Yes I Will"	Joy Factory	Steven Lee, Drew R. Scott, Sean Alexander	Steven Lee, Drew R. Scott, Sean Alexander	3:26
6.	"제발 (Please)" (Instrumental)		Steven Lee, Drew R. Scott, Sean Alexander, Jimmy Burney, Greg Watton	Steven Lee	3:31

DVD (Limited Edition only)
No.	Title	Length
1.	"Making Film"
2.	"Break Down MV"
3.	"제발 (Please) MV"

== Release history ==
Country	Date	Distributing label	Format
South Korea	7 June 2011	KeyEast	CD
South Korea	23 June 2011	KeyEast	Limited Edition (CD+DVD)
Taiwan	1 July 2011	Warner Music Taiwan	CD
Taiwan	12 August 2011	Warner Music Taiwan	Commemorate Edition (CD+poster)

== Charts ==
Chart	Country	Period	Peak position	Notes/Ref
Gaon Single Chart	South Korea	5 -11 June 2011	18	"Break Down"
Gaon Weekly Album Chart	South Korea	5 -11 June 2011	1	
Gaon Monthly Album Chart	South Korea	June	1	100,433 copies
Gaon Yearly Chart	South Korea	2011	9	114,642 copies
G-Music Combo Chart	Taiwan	Week 27 (1 - 7 July 2011)	3	6.81% sales
G-Music J-Pop/K-Pop Chart	Taiwan	Week 27 (1 - 7 July 2011)	1	25.56% sales
Five Music J-Pop/K-Pop Chart	Taiwan	Week 27 (1 - 7 July 2011)	1	13.61% sales
