= Kim Kyu-jong discography =

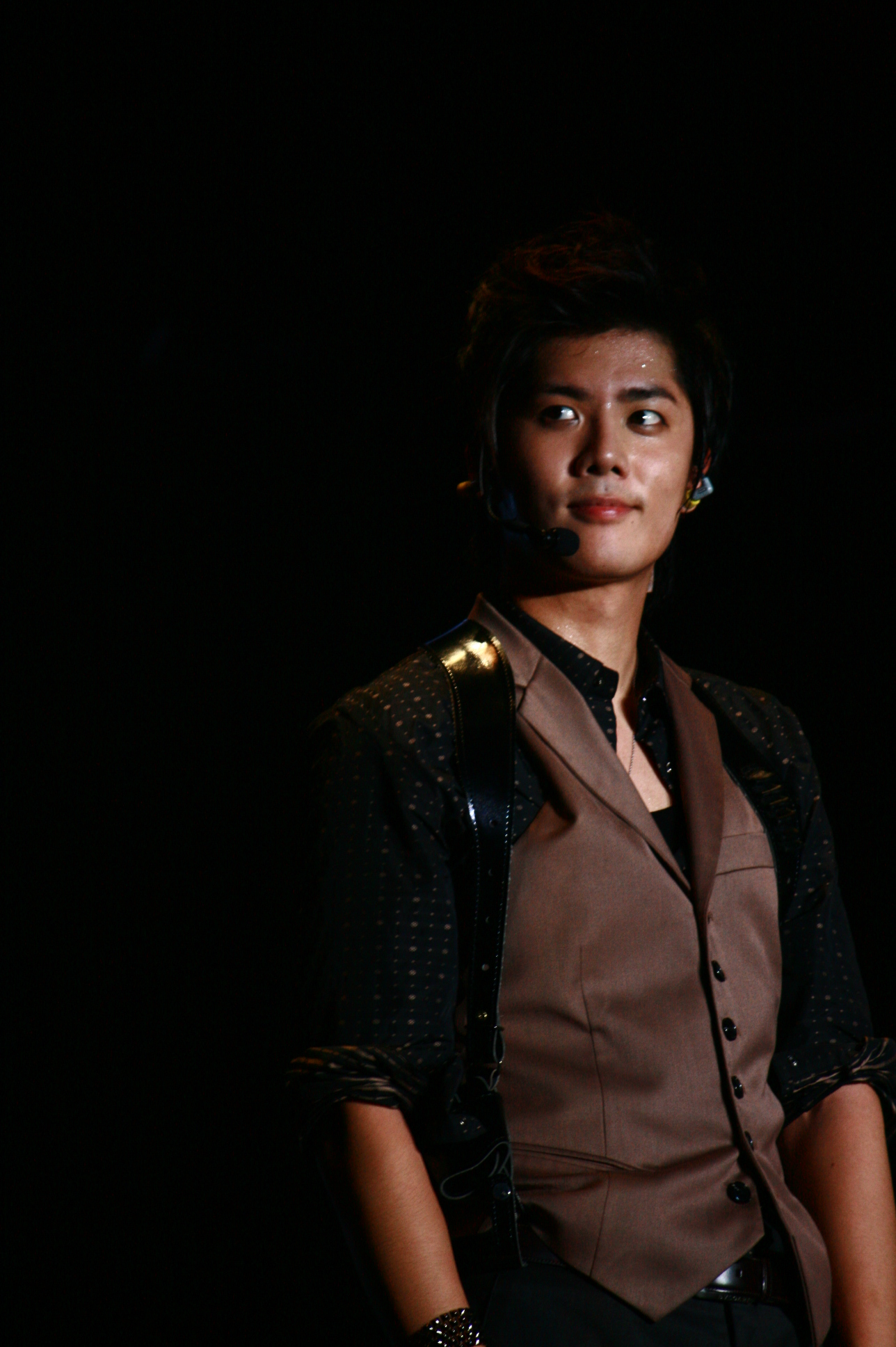
- Kim Kyu-jong at SS501 Persona Concert 2009 in Hong Kong
- Studio albums: 0
- EPs: 2
- Soundtrack albums: 7
- Singles: 6
- Video albums: 5
- Music videos: 4
- Collaborations: 3

South Korean singer and member of SS501, Kim Kyu-jong has released 2 EPs, 5 singles, 6 soundtrack contribution songs, 1 collaboration song, and 5 DVDs.

During 2005-2010, Kim has had three solo songs from SS501 albums: "Hikari" from Kokoro, "Never Let You Go" from U R Man, and "Wuss Up" from SS501 Solo Collection. In 2009, he contributed a soundtrack from Bad Girl OST named "Lonely Girl" with Kim Hyung-jun.

On September 27, 2011 he released his debut solo mini album, Turn Me On with "Yesterday" as its title track. It also features rap by fellow member Heo Young-saeng in dance track "My Love", and Yang Jiwon of Spica in Yesterday music video. The teaser video for "Yesterday" was released on September 22.

On July 18, Kim released a limited edition mini-album Meet Me Again dedicated to his fans before his enlistment. It features three tracks including "Thank You" composed by Kim, himself and "One Luv", a duet with Mighty Mouth's Shorry J, composed by Tae Wan Kim a.k.a. C-Luv.

== Extended plays ==
Year	Title	Details	Peak positions		Sales and Certifications
Year	Title	Details	KOR	JPN	Sales and Certifications
Korean
2011	Turn Me On	Release Date: September 27, 2011; Format: Mini Album Vol.1	3	—	KOR: 18,735
2012	Meet Me Again	Release Date: July 18, 2012; Format: Mini Album Vol.2	5	—	KOR: 9,987
2018	Play in Nature	Release Date: April 19, 2018; Format: Mini Album Vol.3	3	—	—
"—" denotes releases that did not chart or were not released in that region.

== Singles ==
Year	Title	Peak positions		Sales and Certifications	Album
Year	Title	KOR	JPN	Sales and Certifications	Album
Korean
2008	"Never Let You Go"	—	—	-	U R Man
2009	"Wuss Up"	—	—	-	SS501 Solo Collection
2011	"Yesterday"	53	—	-	Turn Me On
2012	"My Precious One"	—	—	-	Meet Me Again
2017	"Hello, Spring" (안녕, 봄)	—	—	-	Play in Nature Part.1 SPRING
2017	"Hug Me"	—	—	-	Play in Nature Part.2 FOREST
2017	"Melt" (녹는 중)	—	—	-	Play in Nature Part.3 SNOW FLAKE
2020	"O.K. - Why are you OK? (feat. Heo Young Saeng)"	—	—	-	
Japanese
2007	"光" (Hikari)	—	—	-	Kokoro (Limited Edition C, Kyu-jong Ver.)
2015	"Drawing Love"	—	34	-	—N/a
"—" denotes releases that did not chart or were not released in that region.

=== As featured artist ===
Year	Title	Peak positions		Sales and Certifications	Album
Year	Title	KOR	JPN	Sales and Certifications	Album
2011	"Rainy Heart" (Heo Young-saeng ft. Kim Kyu-jong)	—	—	-	Let It Go
2015	"Relation Breakup" (Dandi ft. Kim Kyu-jong)	—	—	-	"Relation Breakup"
2015	"Love Timing" (Bobby Moon ft. Kim Kyu-jong and Seulgi)	—	—	-	"Love Timing"
"—" denotes releases that did not chart or were not released in that region.

== Soundtrack contributions ==
Year	Title	Peak positions		Album
Year	Title	KOR	JPN	Album
2009	"악녀일기 리턴즈" (Lonely Girl) with Kim Hyung-jun	—	—	Bad Girl Diary OST
2010	"Confession"	—	—	Superstar OST
2011	"Perhaps Love"	—	—	Goong: Musical OST
2011	"I Want Freedom, Freedom"	—	—	Goong: Musical OST
2011	"ありがとう" (Thank You)	—	—	Goong: Musical OST
2011	"今からお前は"	—	—	Goong: Musical OST
2014	"In Your Days" (with Eric Nam)	—	—	SOS Please Help Me OST

== Video albums ==
Year	Title	Details	Peak positions		Sales and Certifications	Track listing	Ref
Year	Title	Details	KOR	JPN	Sales and Certifications	Track listing	Ref
2011	Heo Young-saeng & Kim Kyu-jong Summer and Love	Release Date: March 25, 2011 (Japan); Format: 2DVD, photobook 1st Private DVD "Summer and Love"	—	236	-	—N/a	
2011	Heo Young-saeng & Kim Kyu-jong 1st Private DVD & Photo Book "Summer and Love" Release Memorial Fan Meeting Event	Release Date: April 15, 2011 (Japan); Format: 1DVD, photobook; Length: 90 min.; Event: Fan Meeting at Shibuya C.C. Lemon Hall on January 22, 2011	—	213	-	—N/a	
2011	Musical GOONG in KYOTO Special DVD	Release Date: December 16, 2011 (Japan); Format: 2DVD	—	—	-	—N/a	
2011	The First Step	Release Date: December 21, 2011 (Japan); December 28, 2011 (Korea); Format: 2DVD	—	—	-	Track listing Japan Edition Disc 1: Yesterday MV: 1. Teaser; 2. Full Version; 3. Making of 4. Special Angle 1 (Close-up ver.); 5. Special Angle 2 (Dance black set ver.); 6. Special Angle 3 (Dance white ver.); 7. Special Angle 4 (Director's story ver.); 8. Special Angle 5 (Image ver.); 9. Special Angle 6 (Multi angles black ver.); 10. Special Angle 7 (Multi angles white ver.); Disc 2: 1. Special letter 2. Interview; 3. Special photo slide show 4. Special smile 5. Staff credits; Korea Edition Disc 1: Yesterday MV: 1. Teaser; 2. Full Version; 3. Making of 4. Special Angle 1 (Close-up ver.); 5. Special Angle 2 (Dance black set ver.); 6. Special Angle 3 (Dance white ver.); 7. Special Angle 4 (Director's story ver.); 8. Special Angle 5 (Image ver.); 9. Special Angle 6 (Multi angles black ver.); 10. Special Angle 7 (Multi angles white ver.); Disc 2: 1. Interview; 2. Special smile 3. Staff credits	
2012	Heo Young-saeng & Kim Kyu-jong Young Saeng + Kyu Jong's 1st Story in Tokyo - Y.E.S & ThanKYU Japan	Release Date: September 19, 2012 (Japan); Format: 2DVD, photobook; Length: 180 min.; Event: Fan Meeting	—	—	-	Track listing Disc 1: 1. Young Saeng + Kyu Jong 1st Party in Tokyo; Disc 2: 1. Making Film 1 - Young Saeng; 2. Making Film 2 - Kju Jong; 3. Find Your Moment (High-Five event)	
"—" denotes releases that did not chart or were not released in that region.

== Videography ==
=== Music videos ===
Year	Song	Director	Length
2011	"Yesterday"		4:19
2011	"Yesterday (Dance Version)"		3:32
2012	"소중한 사람" (My Precious One)	Moon Sang Joo (문성주)	3:33
2015	"Drawing Love"		

== Others ==
=== Production credits ===
Year	Song	Artist	Role	Album
2008	"Never Let You Go"	himself	lyricist	U R Man
2009	"Green Peas"	SS501	co-lyricist with SS501	Rebirth
2012	"My Precious One"	himself	co-lyricist	Meet Me Again
2012	"Thank You"	himself	lyricist and co-composer	Meet Me Again

=== Concerts/Major Fan meetings ===
The following is an incomplete list of Kim Kyu-jong's concerts, major fanmeetings, and tours.

Year	Concert title	Details	Ref.
2010	Kyu Jong & Young Saeng Story In Seoul	Place: Korea, Hong Kong, Japan...; Start date: December 4, 2010	
2012	Thank U ThanKYU with Triple S	Venue: Yonsei University in Sinchon-dong, Seoul; Date: June 3, 2012	
2018	KIM KYU JONG CONCERT IN JAPAN 2018〈THE COLOR OF US〉	Venue: Yamano Hall in Tokyo, Japan; Start date: October 8, 2018	

== See also ==
- SS501 discography
- Kim Hyun-joong discography
- Heo Young-saeng discography
- Park Jung-min discography
- Kim Hyung-jun discography
