= Heo Young-saeng =

South Korean entertainer and vocalist

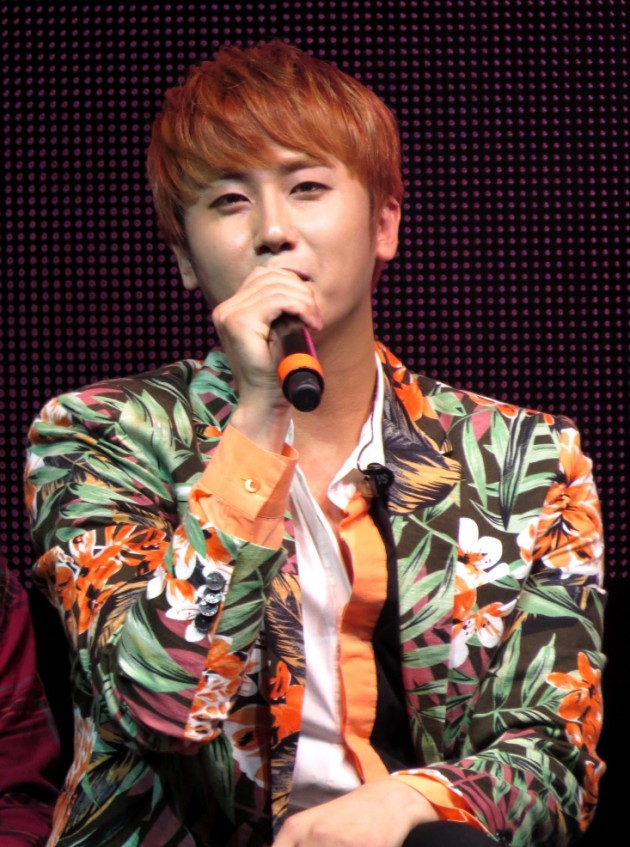
- Heo at a fan meeting in 2013

Background information
- Born: November 3, 1986 (age 40); Gochang County, Jeollabuk-do, South Korea
- Origin: South Korea
- Genres: K-pop; J-pop; ballad; dance; R&B
- Occupations: Singer; actor
- Instrument: Piano
- Years active: 2005–present
- Labels: KQ Entertainment; CI Entertainment; B2M Entertainment; DSP Media; Warner Music; Pony Canyon Japan
- Member of: SS501; Double S 301; Five O One
- Website: Official Website (JP)

Korean name
- Hangul: 허영생
- RR: Heo Yeongsaeng
- MR: Hŏ Yŏngsaeng

Heo Young-saeng (Korean: 허영생; born: November 3, 1986) is a South Korean entertainer. He is the vocalist of the boy band SS501. He's also the leader of Double S 301. In 2010, Heo left DSP Media, who managed him as part of SS501, and moved to B2M Entertainment, with bandmate Kim Kyu-jong, to pursue his solo career. His debut album as a soloist entitled Let It Go was released in May 2011. He then released several albums more in Korea and Japan, with the hit tracks "Crying", "The Art of Seduction", "Weak Child", and "1.2.3", among others. In 2012, Heo played his first acting role in KBS2's sitcom I Need A Fairy.

Heo has performed in musicals as well: he debuted in The Three Musketeers, playing the role of D'Artagnan during 2011, and appeared in 2013, the Summer Snow musical.

On October 31, 2013, Heo started his mandatory, 21-month military service as a police officer. He completed his military service on July 30, 2015. He also joined CI Entertainment.

In December 2015, Heo returned to theater to play the role of Han Min-ho in the musical Haru. It's together with Kim Hyung-jun. Also, it served as the musical comeback of Heo after 21-month of hiatus due to military service.

In January 2016, Heo reunited with Kim Kyu-jong and Kim Hyung-jun and grouped as Double S 301. CI Entertainment released a photo teaser for their comeback. The group released an album entitled Eternal 5 on February 16, 2016, followed by a Japanese album entitled Eternal S on April 20, 2016.

== Early life ==
Heo Young-Saeng was born on November 3, 1986, in Gochang County Jeollabuk-do, South Korea as the only child of his family. He graduated from Hyundai High School and Dong Seoul University. He started as a trainee at SM Entertainment for about 2.5 years. He then joined DSP Media, formerly known as DSP Entertainment and trained for 3 months before debuting. He debuted as a member of SS501 on June 8, 2005.

== Career ==
=== 2005–2009: SS501 debut ===
Heo debuted as a member of SS501 on June 8, 2005, along with their debut album, Warning. Their second mini album, Snow Prince, was released in late 2005, five months after their debut. During this time, the band established their official fan club name, "Triple S", and its color, pearl green. The group earned instant popularity and won many rookie awards following their debut.

Heo hosted SS501's radio program SS501's Youngstreet on SBS along with fellow member Park Jung-min from May 1 to August 21, 2006. He was forced to leave the program due to a throat condition that required laryngeal surgery, and bandmate Kim Kyu-jong took over as DJ.

SS501 soon promoted their first studio album S.T 01 Now. In late 2007, they expanded their activities in the Japanese market to challenge themselves outside Korea with the release of their Japanese single Kokoro, along with the establishment of "Triple S Japan". The single debuted at number 5. They had two more successful releases in Japan entitled Distance and SS501 The band received the Newcomer Award by Japan Gold Disc Award in January 2008; this was the first time Korean artists had received this award.

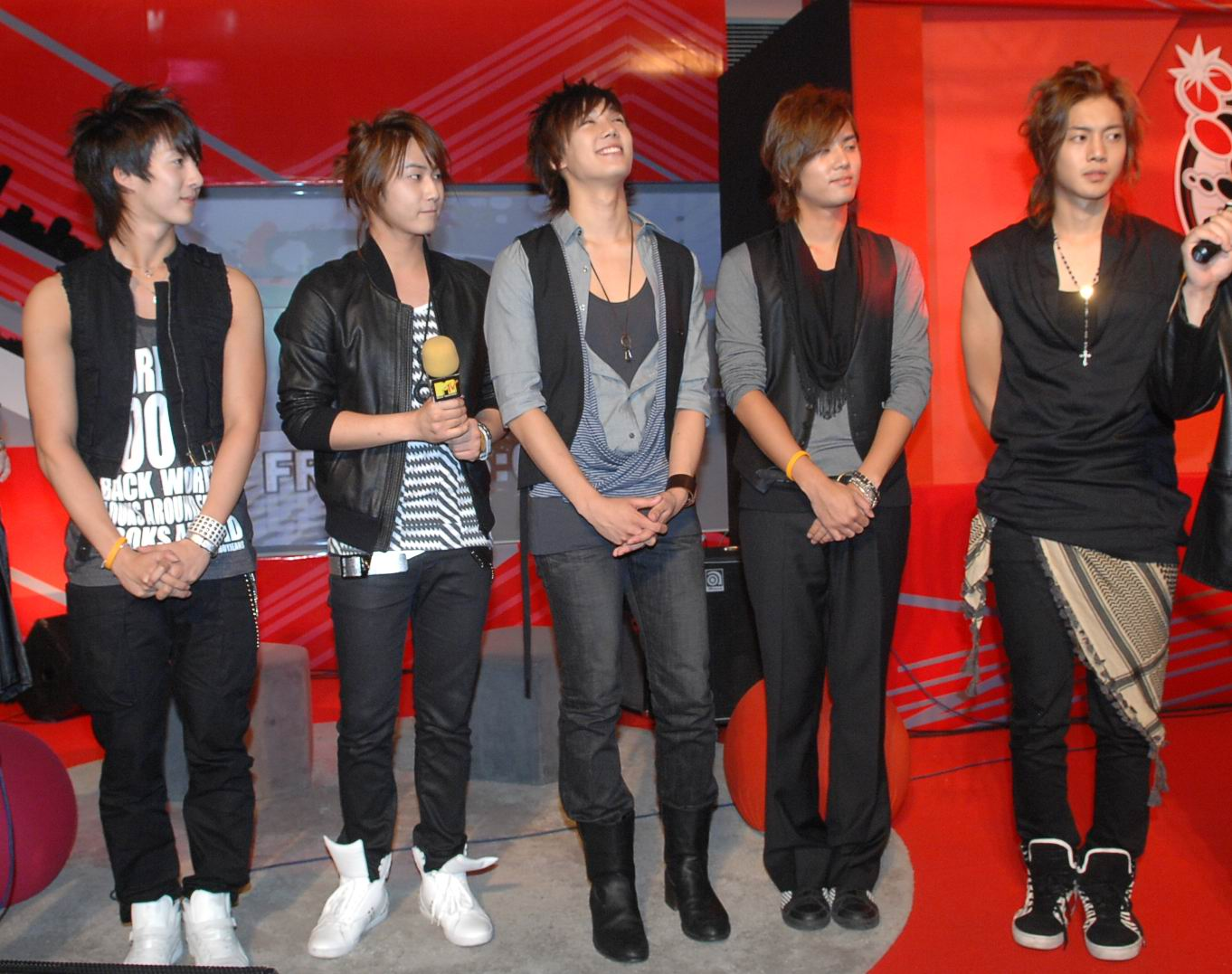
SS501 at My Style My MTV on stage (2008)

Having built their foundation as artists in Japan and Korea, SS501 continued to release singles and albums in both Korea and Japan, such as Deja Vu in Korea and Lucky Days in Japan, both released in 2008. However, they stopped their activities as a group for a period of time as Park Jung-Min and Kim Hyun-Joong were given solo projects for the Grease musical and the Boys Over Flowers series, respectively. Nevertheless, the three remaining members, with Heo as lead singer, continued to tour, dubbed as the SS501 Project Group. They released a project album named U R Man in November 2008, with the high-tempo dance title track "UR Man". They also contributed to the Boys Over Flowers soundtrack with "내 머리가 나빠서" (Because I'm Stupid), and appeared as a cameo in episode four, performing their track, "U R Man". The track won Song of the Month for February at the 32nd Cyworld Digital Music Awards on March 28, 2009. as well as the Best OST of the year during the 2009 Mnet Asian Music Awards.

In 2009–2010, SS501 released All My Love, Solo Collection, Rebirth, and Destination consecutively before their contracts ended. Heo wrote his solo track "사랑인거죠" (Is it Love?) by himself, which made him the first SS501 member to compose and write the lyrics of the song. "사랑인거죠" (Is it Love?) was written during SS501's activities in Japan in 2007, as well as the lyrics for his part of "완.두.콩." (Green Peas), a song written for their fans. Moreover, Heo composed "영원토록" (Until Forever), which was originally a wedding song, but since he felt sad whenever he heard the song, he did not give it a wedding-themed title.

In 2009, Heo started contributing soundtracks to television dramas, which includes "눈물을 지워가" (I Erase Tears) from Friend, Our Legend and "사랑해요..미안해요.." (I Love You.. I'm Sorry..) from Will It Snow for Christmas?.

=== 2010–2012: Leaving DSP Media, solo and acting debut ===
In June 2010, upon the expiration of SS501's contract with DSP Media, Heo along with fellow band member Kim Kyu Jong, signed with B2M Entertainment, the agency of former DSP Media songstress Lee Hyori, to embark on his solo career.

He was scheduled to launch his solo singing career on April 28, 2011, but had to postpone because he pulled the ligaments on his right hand during a dance practice. He was also scheduled to guest star on SBS's Good Sunday variety show Running Man, on May 8, 2011, but due to his injury, he appeared only briefly to hand out a mission.

Heo's solo debut mini album, Let It Go, was released on May 12, 2011, which features Spica's Park Ju-hyun on the music video, and Kim Kyu Jong and Hyuna on "Rainy Love" and "Let It Go" tracks respectively. The album peaked at number one on Gaon's album chart for the week starting on May 8.

On November 9, 2011, Heo, along with other Korean and Japanese artists, performed at the Seoul Tokyo Music Festival 2011 at the Saitama Super Arena, Japan. At the same time, Heo made his musical debut in The Three Musketeers, playing the role of D'Artagnan from November 3 to December 18.

In February 2012, KBS confirmed that Heo would be part of KBS2's daily sitcom called I Need A Fairy (also known as Sent From Heaven), playing the role Heo Young Saeng/ Kaki. A month later, he released a soundtrack of the said drama entitled "Love Song".

On May 9, 2012, B2M Entertainment officially announced via Twitter that Heo, himself, participated in the planning process and production of his new mini album Solo. As an artist, he wanted to go from being an idol to co-producing his work, especially since he had participated in the making of this album. The music video teaser was released on May 18, 2012.

Heo released his first Japanese album entitled Overjoyed in Japan on September 19, 2012, under Pony Canyon Japan. It consists of eight songs, including three Japanese versions of songs from his previous Korean mini albums. Overjoyed entered the Japanese Oricon weekly album charts at No. 29.

=== 2013–2014: Summer Snow musical, music expansion and military service ===
Together with Bada, Bobby Kim, and Jeon Soo-kyung, Heo was invited to be a guest judge on MBC's Birth of A Great Star 3 in January. He was also invited to do a collaboration with Lee Jung Bong later on. They produced a duet song named "Goodbye My Love", which was released on January 31. During this time, he was already preparing for his upcoming third mini album. His company also confirmed through their website on February 14 that Heo was to join the cast of Summer Snow musical, originated from a Japanese Drama, to be held in April in Osaka, Japan, and at the end of May to June in Tokyo, Japan. They had a press conference on February 20 held in Tokyo.

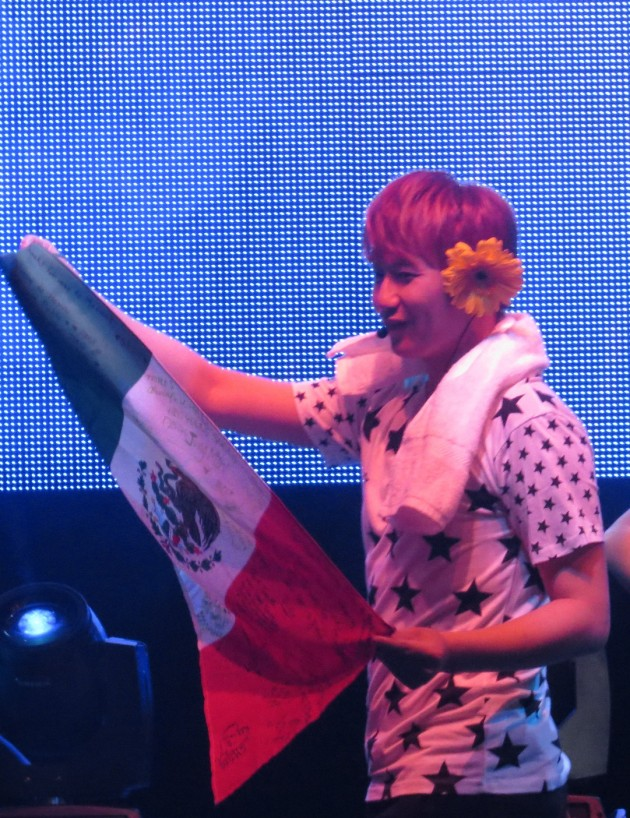
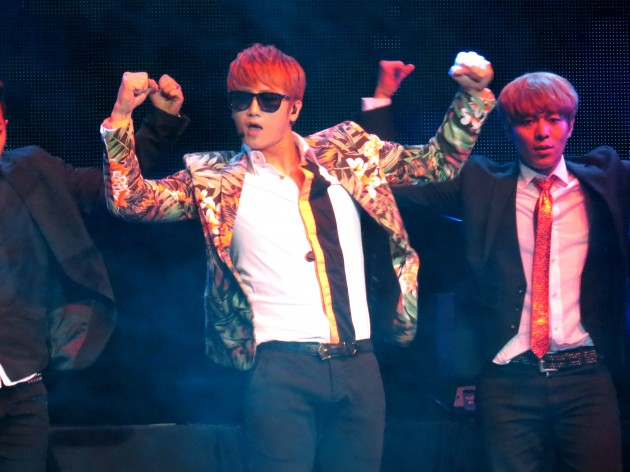
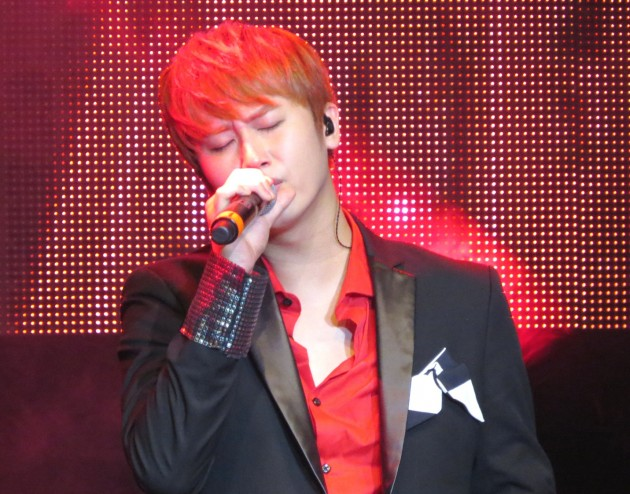
Heo's selected performances during his joint Fanmeeting tour in Mexico (2013)

On March 18, he released his third mini album Life containing four songs, including his music video entitled "The Art of Seduction". After his album promotions, he left to Japan and started his Summer Snow musical. He played the role of Tachibana Seiji, a young doctor who has a one-sided love to his patient, Katase Yuki.

On May 29, news was spreading that Heo planned to enlist for his mandatory military service in November. According to one of B2M Entertainment's representatives, he planned to enlist by the end of 2013 upon receiving a draft notice. At the time, he already completed the checkup, and was found to be fit for active duty by the Office of Military Manpower Administration.

During SS501's eight anniversary, Heo, along with the SS501 members posted one video of them celebrating and greeting their fans onto each of their own official YouTube accounts. Kim Hyun Joong was not able to be in the video at that time because he was filming for his variety show, Barefooted Friends.

During early June, Heo's Japan official website released tracks and information for his upcoming second Japanese album entitled Memories To You, which was released on July 3. The title is said to be Heo's memories shared with his fans. The album mainly consists of SS501 cover songs and rearranged tracks from his past albums, but there are also two new songs included. In addition, Heo's first solo composed song entitled "First Sky I've Ever Seen" (はじめて見る空だった), originally from Kokoro album, is also included in the album, totaling up to ten songs. A concert was held in Zepp Tokyo on July 11.

Heo performed during the Lotte Family Festival 2013, together with the other 28 performers in Seoul. He performed during the second day of the festival on September 14, which was largely devoted to K-drama popular original soundtracks. In particular, he sang "Because I'm Stupid" from Boys Over Flowers original soundtrack, which won several awards back in 2009.

On October 3, B2M officially announced Heo's enlistment details through his official website. They confirmed that he would officially enlist on October 31 at 2 pm at Nonsan Korean Army Training Center. Four days later, B2M once again announced Heo was to release his last album release on October 16, before joining the army the following month after his first concert in Korea. At the same time, Yesasia released a pre-order version of She special album. The album contains five tracks about a man's regrets and painful memories for a past lover, and his single, "Weak Child", featured Japanese actress Fujii Mina.

On October 26, Heo had his first and farewell concert in Seoul entitled "2013 Heo Young-saeng Seoul Concert 0513 My Story" held at the UNIQLO AX Hall. The event marked the first time that all five members of SS501 appeared together on one stage onscreen and performed together as a group again after three years. On the side note, his fans from all over the world had donated a total of 1.23 tons of rice, 200 eggs, and 2,400 coal briquettes to be given to a Heo's chosen charity.

Heo is the second member of SS501 to be enlisted after Kim Kyu-jong. He was enlisted as a conscripted policeman for about twenty-one months after passing in late July, which he has been preparing for after receiving the draft notice. During his training, he became one of the leaders of the troop while enjoying his army life with his unit members, as told by his handwritten letter to his fans.

=== 2015–present: Military discharge, departure from B2M, Haru, and Double S 301 ===
On July 30, 2015, Heo completed his military service and was officially discharged. He made his exit quietly through a private discharge ceremony without holding any special events or meeting with the press. It was also reported that the singer has officially signed an exclusive contract with CI Entertainment, also home to Kim Dong Wan and fellow SS501 member Kim Hyung-jun. CEO of CI ENT shared that Heo Young Saeng will actively begin promotions in singing as well as acting in the near future.

According to CI ENT, "We are very pleased and honored that yesterday's (August 4) ticket open for Heo Young-saeng's fan meeting sold out. Heo Young Saeng is working hard to repay the fans who have a lot of interest and support for Heo Young Saeng's first activity after being discharged from the army, so please have a lot of anticipation for Heo Young Saeng's fan meeting on August 29."

Itt was reported that Heo was in negotiations with CI Entertainment as early as June 2015, during his enlistment. The agency told Newsen, "We're currently positively meeting with Heo Young-saeng regarding his contract. Around the time of his discharge, the decision on his contract is expected to come out. The company is actively recruiting and Heo Young Saeng is said to be positively looking over it. If the contract does get signed, we plan on support Heo Young Saeng in all aspects from singing to acting."

Heo together with Kim Hyung-jun were cast in the musical Haru. They performed the musical at the Meijijao Theater in Tokyo Japan from December 13 to the 25th featuring Kim Hyung-jun and Heo as Kang Young-won and Han Min-ho respectively.

In January 2016, Heo reunited with Kim Kyu-jong and Kim Hyung-jun and grouped as "Double S 301". While, Hyun Joong and Jung Min were inactive at the time due to military service duty, CI Entertainment released a photo teaser for their comeback. On January 20, 2016, CI Entertainment revealed second photo teaser and announced release date for album "ETERNAL 5". The album released on February 16, 2016. The group held a concert at BLUE SQUARE Samsung Card Hall on March 19 and 20, 2016 entitled "2016 Double S 301 CONCERT〈U R MAN IS BACK〉IN SEOUL".

Following the Double S 301 Korean debut, they are debuted in Japan with an album entitled Eternal S, followed by a concert in Tokyo and Osaka, Japan. Particularly in Tokyo Dome City Hall and Orix Theater on April 25 and 27 respectively. 4 months after their Korean debut, the group released a special album Estreno for SS501's 11th anniversary since debut.

In June 2016, Heo started to participate in MBC's Duet Song Festival with Lee Jeong-Hyuk. The Duo won during their first performance covering TVXQ's Mirotic. After his win was announced, Heo said, "This is the first time I've won No. 1 in anything in six years." Heo continue to participate in various show just like King of Mask Singer and Singing Battle – Victory.

In Dec 2016, prior to Double S 301's comeback activities, Heo rose gained popularity from singing the song, 'I cannot forget' in the OST for 'Blow Breeze', on MBC Weekend Drama, released on December 3, 2016.

== Discography ==
Solo work

- Overjoyed (2012)
- Memories to You (2013)

== Filmography ==
=== Television series ===
| Year | Title | Network | Role | Notes |
|---|---|---|---|---|
| 2005 | Nonstop 5 | MBC | | Episode 207 |
| 2005 | M! Countdown | Mnet | MC | |
| 2008 | Boys Over Flowers | KBS2 | | Episode 4 |
| 2012 | I Need a Fairy | KBS2 | | Episodes 23–100 |
| 2013 | Star Audition – The Great Birth 3 | MBC | Mentor | Season 3, episode 12 |
| 2016 | Duet Song Festival | MBC | Contestant | Episodes 12–15 |
| 2016 | King of Mask Singer | MBC | Contestant | Episodes 73–74 |

=== Musical theater ===
- 2011: The Three Musketeers – as D'Artagnan (November 3 – December 18)
- 2013: Summer Snow Musical – as Tachibana Seiji (May 31 – June 14)
- 2015: Musical Haru – as Han Minho (December 13–25)
- 2017 – 2018: All Shook Up – as Elvis (November 24 – February 10)

=== Radio DJ ===
- May – August 21, 2008: SBS Power FM – SS501's Young Street (Korean: SS501의 영스트리트)

== Bibliography ==
- August 2011: Photo Message Book
- December 2011: Heo Young-saeng & Kim Kyu-jong – 2012 Double Attraction (Limited Edition with DVD)
- December 2012: 2013 Desk Calendar (with Making DVD)
- August 2013: Eternal Life

== Awards ==
| Year | Award | Category | Result |
|---|---|---|---|
| 2012 | 1st Korea Practice Awards | Culture and Arts Practice Award | Won |
