= Kim Hyung-jun =

South Korean entertainer and rapper

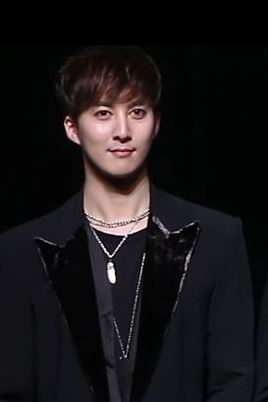
- Kim on December 8, 2016
- Born: 김형준 (金亨俊); August 3, 1987 (age 39); Seoul, South Korea
- Education: Kyonggi University
- Occupations: Singer; DJ; MC; actor
- Musical career
- Genres: K-pop; J-pop; dance; R&B
- Instruments: Piano; guitar
- Years active: 2005–present
- Labels: DSP Media; S-Plus Entertainment; CI Entertainment; Avex Trax JP
- Member of: SS501, Double S 301

Korean name
- Hangul: 김형준
- Hanja: 金亨俊
- RR: Gim Hyeongjun
- MR: Kim Hyŏngjun

Kim Hyung-jun (Korean: 김형준; born August 3, 1987) is a South Korean entertainer, lead rapper and youngest member of boyband SS501 and SS301. In 2010, Kim left DSP Media, who managed him as part of SS501, and joined S-Plus Entertainment as a solo artist. He made his debut as a soloist in March 2011 with mini album My Girl, and musical debut in Caffeine. In 2012, Kim starred on his first main lead role as Kang-min in KBS Drama's My Shining Girl, followed by SBS Plus's Late Blossom as Jung Min-chae in the same year. At the end of the year, Kim received the Rising Star Award for his role in Late Blossom by the K-Drama Star Awards.

== Early life ==
Kim Hyung-jun was born on August 3, 1987, in Seoul, South Korea. His family consists of his parents and a little brother named Kim Kibum, who was a former member of U-KISS and Xing, and currently a soloist.

Kim studied in the Department of Information and Communication at Kyonggi University, a school affiliated with Dongguk University Teacher's College High School with fellow SS501 member Park Jung-min.

== Career ==
=== 2005–2009: SS501 Debut ===
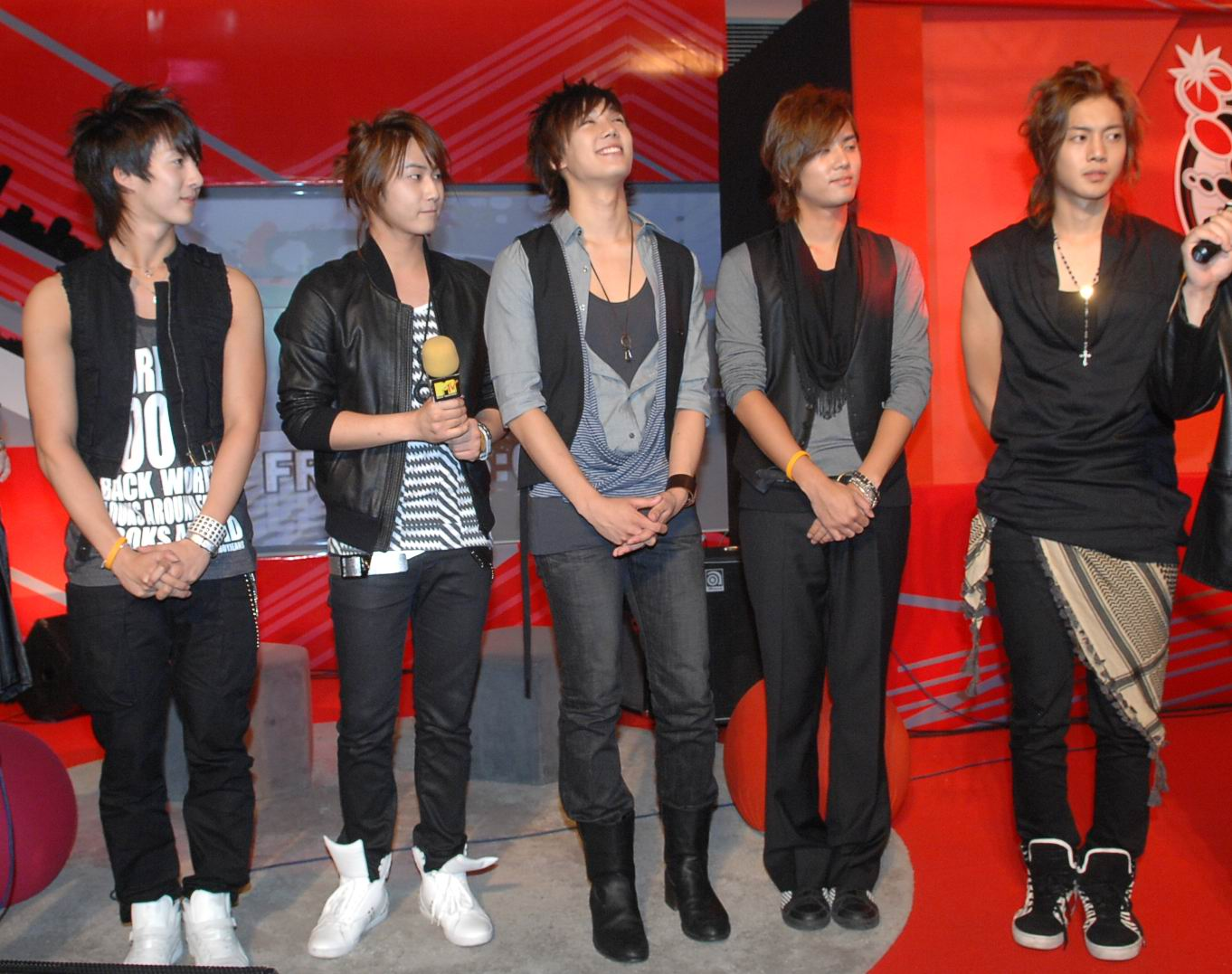
SS501 at My Style My MTV on stage (2008)

Kim Hyung-jun debuted as a youngest member of SS501 on June 8, 2005, along with their debut album entitled Warning. Their second mini album, Snow Prince was released in late 2005, five months after their debut. During this time, they also established their official fan club name, "Triple S", and its color, pearl green. The group earned popularity right away as they won many rookie awards after their debut.

Kim, along with the members of SS501 (except for Heo Young Saeng, who was recovering from the surgery), lent their voices to the Korean version of 2006 animated film Pi's Story.

SS501 soon promoted their first studio album S.T 01 Now. In late 2007, they expanded their activities in the Japanese market to challenge themselves outside Korea with the release of their Japanese single Kokoro, along with the establishment of "Triple S Japan". After the single debuted at No. 5, they had 2 more successful releases in Japan entitled Distance and SS501. Within one year in Japan, they received the Newcomer Award by Japan Gold Disc Award in January 2008; this was the first time for Korean artists to receive this award.

Having built their foundation as artists in Japan and Korea, they continually released singles and albums back-and-forth such as Deja Vu in South Korea and Lucky Days in Japan, both released in 2008. However, they stopped their activities as a group for a period of time as Park Jung-Min and Kim Hyun-Joong were given solo projects for Grease musical and Boys Over Flowers series respectively. Nevertheless, the three remaining members, with Heo as the leader, continued to promote, dubbed as the SS501 Project Group. They released a project album named U R Man in November 2008, with high tempo dance title track "UR Man". They also contributed to the Boys Over Flowers soundtrack with "내 머리가 나빠서" (Because I'm Stupid), and appeared as a cameo in episode four, performing their track, "U R Man". The track won Song of the Month for February at the 32nd Cyworld Digital Music Awards on March 28, 2009. as well as the Best OST of the year during the 2009 Mnet Asian Music Awards.

In 2009–2010, SS501 released All My Love, Solo Collection, Rebirth, and Destination consecutively before their contracts ended. During this time, Kim started writing lyrics along with his brother Kibum, which includes "Want It", "The One", and "I Am" from UR Man album, and "Hey G" from SS501 Solo Collection. He also wrote the lyrics for the song "Obsess" and his part of "완.두.콩." (Green Peas), a song written for their fans, released in their album Rebirth in 2009.

=== 2010–2012: Leaving DSP Media, My Girl and Escape albums, musical and acting career ===
In June 2010, upon the expiration of SS501's contract with DSP Media, he signed with S-Plus Entertainment in August 2010, to embark on his solo career. S-Plus Entertainment stated that SS501's activities are top priority in his contract and that they have not disbanded. In December, Kim and his younger brother Kibum launched 'HnB company', which stands for 'Happy n Bright'. It is a character design brand with its first product named PiroPiro, a bear with dark circles under its eyes, representing tired office workers and those who feel the strain of work.

In January 2011, Kim signed with Avex Entertainment for his Japanese activities. On March 8, 2011, Kim finally released his debut solo mini album My Girl with music videos for the two lead tracks "oH! aH!" and "Girl", in which Park Jung-min visited him during the music video shoot for the latter. A Japanese version was released on April 6, 2011, with two bonus tracks of Japanese versions of the two lead tracks. In June, Kim performed with other Korean artists in the Fantastic K-POP Concert in Jakarta, followed by concert in Singapore and in Hong Kong to promote his mini album.

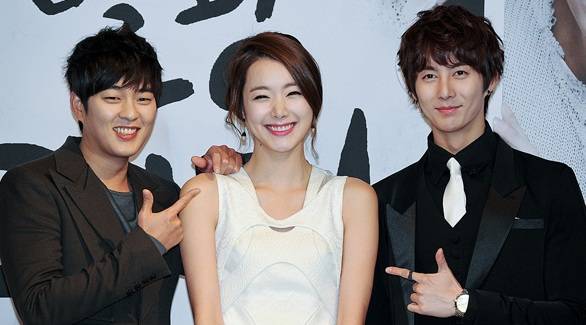
Kim (right) with Glowing She main casts during a press conference on January 4, 2012

In October 2011, Kim made his theater debut in the romantic comedy musical Caffeine, where he played as a barista. After his acting debut in Black City, Kim starred on his first main lead role in KBS Drama's romantic comedy series, My Shining Girl in March. He played Kang-Min's character, a top star in the Korean entertainment business who is a bit temperamental; charming but rude and attempts to transform from a singer into an actor. His acting career was followed by SBS Plus's Late Blossom in the same year. The drama is based on a popular comic by Kang Full that has already been turned into a movie, which tells the love story between the elderly, and is SBS Plus' first feature-length drama to be produced in-house. Kim played the character Jung Min-chae, a smart public service officer.

In July, he released his second mini album entitled Escape with its single "Sorry, I'm Sorry". The album includes five songs, and a 25-minute drama MV starring Kang Ji-hwan, Lee Ki-woo, and himself. He, then, held his first solo live tour ‘2012 1st Story in Japan' in April and '2012 2nd Story in Japan' in August consecutively.

In November, he was cast in Rough Play (An Actor is an Actor) with Lee Joon, a film written and produced by Kim Ki-duk. When December came, he became active in attending several award shows and music festivals, including the 2012 Thailand Korea Friendship Festival and 2012 Malaysia Model Festival Awards where he met the world famous designer Jimmy Choo. He also receives his first award in the 2012 K-Drama Star Awards where he was given the Rising Star Award for Late Blossom drama.

=== 2013–present: Kim Hyung Jun "The First", South America tours ===
In early 2013, Kim attended the 2013 Asian Model Awards where he received the Fashionista Award on the evening of January 15 at the Olympic Hall in Seoul Olympic Park.

In February, it was announced that Kim would be having his very first solo concert in South Korea to commemorate his 2nd anniversary since his solo debut in 2011. Ticket sales were pre-released on February 12. Kim Hyung Jun "The First", the name of the concert, was held on March 9 at the Woori Art Hall at the Olympic Park, organized by SPLUS Entertainment and managed by SH Creative Works. Kim showed his capabilities as a solo artist during the concert. The concert showcased various music genres and performances with live band performances for all of his songs, which created a lively-filled stage. It also showcased his more matured musicality which he gained from both his acting career and musical development. This includes his guitar skills, which he played live for the first time. At the same time, one of the groups of his former label, A-jax of DSP Media performed on stage, and his fellow SS501 member, Kim Kyu Jong even got up on stage with him at the end of the concert.

On March 17, he attended another charity event, SPD Charity Show 2013 in Singapore, being one of the representatives of Korea. He, then, came back on television screens, as he has been cast in MBC drama's Gold, Appear! (‘I Summon You, Gold!‘), premiered on April 6. He plays the role of Han Ji Hye's younger brother Mong Gyu, an unemployed post-graduate with cute charms and a carefree attitude.

On May 1, it was reported that he is planning to be enlisted in the military next year, 2014. During this time, he was busy preparing for his 'Who Am I' live tour concert in Nagoya and Tokyo at the end of May and early June. The Japanese live concert was held on March 29 to April 7, six concerts in total that went through cities such as Osaka, Nagoya, and Tokyo.

During SS501's eight anniversary, Kim, along with the SS501 members posted one video of them celebrating and greeting their fans onto each of their own official YouTube accounts. Kim Hyun Joong was not able to be in the video at that time because he had a shooting in his variety show, Barefooted Friends. However, Kim Hyun Joong still talked about their anniversary during his Korea fanmeeting entitled 2013 KHJ Show – Party People, held at the same day of their anniversary.

Kim became a Lotte JTB advertising model in June. To celebrate, he had a "2013 Kim Hyung Jun birthday party tour" exclusively for Japanese fans. Lotte JTB's official reason for choosing him is that: "He always has a bright and healthy image and has a positive influence as a singer and actor both domestically and aboard. His image blends in well with Lotte JTB's of high-quality travel and culture-oriented healthy image."

Kim attended Heo Young-saeng's first and farewell concert in Seoul entitled 2013 Heo Young Saeng Seoul Concert 0513 My Story on October 26 at the UNIQLO AX Hall. This time, all of the SS501 members appeared together on one stage and performed together as one group again after three years. They sang their self-written song dedicated to their fans, "Green Peas", and their a cappella version of the song, "In the Still of the Night".

On August 13, Kim released a special digital single with Sunny Hill's Kota entitled "Always Love You", with a release of a video teaser on August 8. The song is an acoustic medium R&B produced by Kim, while the music video has an innocent love story theme, filmed on Hanseo University' airfield, and capturing 'beautiful sights' in the sky. Kim held fan events and love showcase for the Japanese release of the song at Shibuya Public Hall, Tokyo on the October 21 and 22. The single ranked 9th on Oricon's Top 10 Charts.

On September 25, Kim has been chosen as the lead actor in KSB's Melody of Love. His role, Taekyung, is the leader of a drama troupe and musical director. Kim also attended the red carpet of the 2013 Busan International Film Festival for his movie, Rough Play.

During early 2014, Kim headed to South America starting on January 10 for his first solo concert in the continent, which included press interviews, charity events, and fan meetings with thousands of fans in Peru, Chile, and Bolivia. Right after, Kim held his second solo concert in Korea entitled He, His Story on February 8 at Yonsei University, celebrating three years since his debut as a soloist.

On the afternoon of October 9, Kim departed for Japan for his Japanese tour. Kim planned to kick off his '2014 LIVE TOUR – Endless Story' on the 10th and perform a total of 7 concerts in Tokyo, Nagoya, and Osaka until November 28.

== Popularity and impact ==
SS501 is one of the artists who made a big impact to K-Pop's international success. An international website, Allkpop, pointed out:

"[T]hey were able to kick the door down and paved the road to the Japanese market that many of the current idol groups enjoy today..."

Furthermore, SS501 also influenced the Korean word maknae ("youngest member") in Japan. It is common in K-Pop bands to include their positions in their group such as the leader and main vocalist whenever they introduce themselves; in Japan, the word is often associated with Kim Hyung-jun.

In January 2014, Kim headed to South America and performed in Peru, Chile, and Bolivia, marking him as the first K-pop idol to perform in the latter. The tour proved his popularity in the continent as both fans and the press media followed him everywhere he went, causing traffic on the road and calling of police to maintain safety. Fans were also seen pitching their tents outside the concert venue for days before the actual concert.

== Philanthropy ==
Kim is active in promoting and campaigning for humanity.

In 2011, Kim donated three tons of rice to the Seoul Youth Center and gave presents to the families in need. It became an annual event as he donated three tons of rice to 2012 7th Annual Love Santa Claus Celebration in the same center once again. He dressed up as Santa Claus on December 21 to give rice and presents; In 2013, however, he did not have a chance to personally attend because of his busy schedule. Nevertheless, he prepared a video message and donated two tons of rice and presents for low-income children.

In 2012, he joined If Love Earth, take Action campaign by Wisdomforfuture, in which they promote taking action to save the Earth. Other notable artists include BAP and Rainbow.

He became the Korean Representative during the SPD Charity Show 2013, which was held to help those with physical disabilities. Stars from across Asia took part to raise funds through their performances and all proceeds were donated to Singapore's Society for the Physically Disabled (SPD). He promoted a campaign in PuppyMam Dog Station magazine for adopting a pet instead of buying one.

In 2014, Kim did the Ice Bucket Challenge, an activity involving dumping a bucket of ice water on one's head or donating to the ALS Association in the United States.

== Discography ==
=== Korean ===
Mini albums

- My Girl (2011)
- Escape (2012)
- AM to PM (2017)

=== Japanese ===
EPs/Singles

- Long Night (2011)
- Be With You (2015)

== Filmography ==
=== Film ===
Year	Title	Hangul	Role
2006	Pi's Story	파이 스토리	Voice (Korea Version) – Pisces or Pi (Main Role)
2013	Rough Play (An Actor is an Actor)	배우는 배우다	Kong Myung

=== Television series ===
Year	Title	Original title	Role	Network	Genre
2005	Nonstop 5	논스톱 5	Cameo Ep.207	MBC	Sitcom
2007	Hotelier	ホテリアー	Cameo Ep.7 (with SS501)	TV Asahi	Japanese drama
2008	Spotlight	스포트라이트	Cameo (with SS501)	MBC	Drama
2008	Boys Over Flowers	꽃보다 남자	Cameo Ep.4 (with Heo Young-saeng and Kim Kyu-jong)	KBS2	Drama
2011	Pianissimo (DVD title: Super Star)	피아니시모	Dong-wook (Ep. "Black City")	TrendE	Mini drama
2012	My Shining Girl	자체발광 그녀	Kang-min	KBS Drama	Drama
2012	Late Blossom	그대를 사랑합니다	Jung Min-chae	SBS Plus	Drama
2013	Pots of Gold		Jung Mong-gyu	MBC	Drama
2013	Melody of Love	사랑은 노래를 타고	Han Tae Kyung	KBS1	Drama

=== Television shows ===
Year	Title	Hangul	Episodes	Network
2008	We Got Married Season 1	우리 결혼했어요	recurring guest	MBC
2009	Double HJ in Date with Park Kyung-lim		2 Episodes	
2009	Haptic Mission		cameo	Samsung Anycall promotion
2010	Hyung-jun Becomes a Progamer	형준, 프로게이머 되다	January 27 to March 31	MBC game
2011	Hyung-jun Forms a Game Team / Becomes a Progamer season 2	형준, 프로게이머 되다 Season 2	from January 21	MBC game

=== MC ===
Year	Title	Network	Date
2005	M! Countdown with Park Jung-min	Mnet	June 9 to October 13
2006	Hello Chat	Mnet	May 1, 2006, to June 5, 2006)
2008	Ch 27 알부라리 (Albrary Ch 27)	Mnet	March 16 to 31
2009	The M! with Sunny	MTV	February 13 to August 17
2009	식신원정대 (God of Cookery Expedition)	MBC DramaNet	June 5 to July 31
2009	출발! 녹색황금 (Green Gold)	SBS	September 14 to October 19
2010	오밤중의 아이들 (Midnight Idols)	MBC	September 30 to November 5
2011	Mnet Wide News with Lee Sol	Mnet	June 22 to December 9

=== Musical theater ===
- 2010–11: Cafe-in (Korean: 카페인) – November 24 to January 24
- 2022: Sleuth (추적) – Milo Tindle; October 21 to December 31
- 2023: My Mother (친정엄마) – Mi-young's husband and Bong-ran's son-in-law

=== Radio DJ ===
- 2009: SBS Power FM – Kim Hyung-jun's Music High (Korean: 김형준의 뮤직하이)

== Awards and nominations ==
Year	Award	Category	Nominated work	Result
2010	MBC game	Honorary ProGamer Certificate		Received
2012	1st K-Drama Star Awards	Rising Star Award	My Shining Girl, Late Blossom	Won
2013	8th Asia Model Awards	Fashionista Award		Won
2013	KBS Drama Awards	Netizen's Award, actor	Melody of Love	Nominated
