= Kim Kyu-jong =

South Korean entertainer (born 1987)

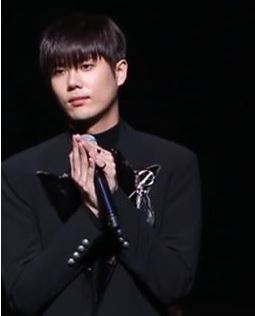
- Kim in December 2016

Background information
- Born: February 24, 1987 (age 39); Jeonju, North Jeolla Province, South Korea
- Genres: K-pop, J-pop, Dance, R&B
- Occupations: Singer; dancer; DJ; MC; actor; model
- Instrument: Vocals
- Years active: 2005–present
- Label: Connectome Entertainment
- Member of: SS501; Five O One
- Website: kyu-jong.com

Korean name
- Hangul: 김규종
- Hanja: 金奎鐘
- RR: Gim Gyujong
- MR: Kim Kyujong

Kim Kyu-jong (Korean: 김규종; born February 24, 1987) is a South Korean entertainer, actor, and a member of boyband SS501. He made his musical debut in Goong: Musical, playing the lead role of Lee Shin, and debut as a solo artist in September 2011 with his mini album Turn Me On.

== Early life ==
Kim Kyu Jong was born on February 24, 1987, in Jeonju, North Jeolla Province, South Korea. His family consists of his parents and a younger sister, Kim Eun-ah.

He studied at Baekje Arts College, and applied music.

== Career ==
=== 2005-2009: SS501 Debut ===
Kim Kyu Jong debuted as a member of SS501 on June 8, 2005, along with their debut album entitled Warning. Their second mini album, Snow Prince was released in late 2005, five months after their debut. During this time, they already established their official fan club name, "Triple S", and its color, pearl green. The group earned popularity right away as they won many rookie awards after their debut.

He started his acting career with a role in Mnet hip-hop music drama Break on May 11, 2006. Kim, along with the members of SS501, except for Heo Young-Saeng who was recovering from surgery, lent their voices to the Korean version of the 2006 animated film Pi's Story.

On August 21, 2006, when fellow member Heo Young-Saeng left the radio programme SS501's Youngstreet on Seoul Broadcasting System (SBS) due to a throat condition requiring laryngeal surgery, he took over being the DJ, and continued to host the programme with fellow member Park Jung-min.

SS501 soon promoted their first studio album S.T 01 Now. In late 2007, they expanded their activities in the Japanese market to challenge themselves outside Korea with the release of their Japanese single Kokoro, along with the establishment of "Triple S Japan". After the single debuted at #5, they had 2 more successful releases in Japan entitled Distance and SS501. In around one year in Japan, they received the Newcomer Award by Japan Gold Disc Award in January 2008; this was the first time for Korean artists to receive this award.

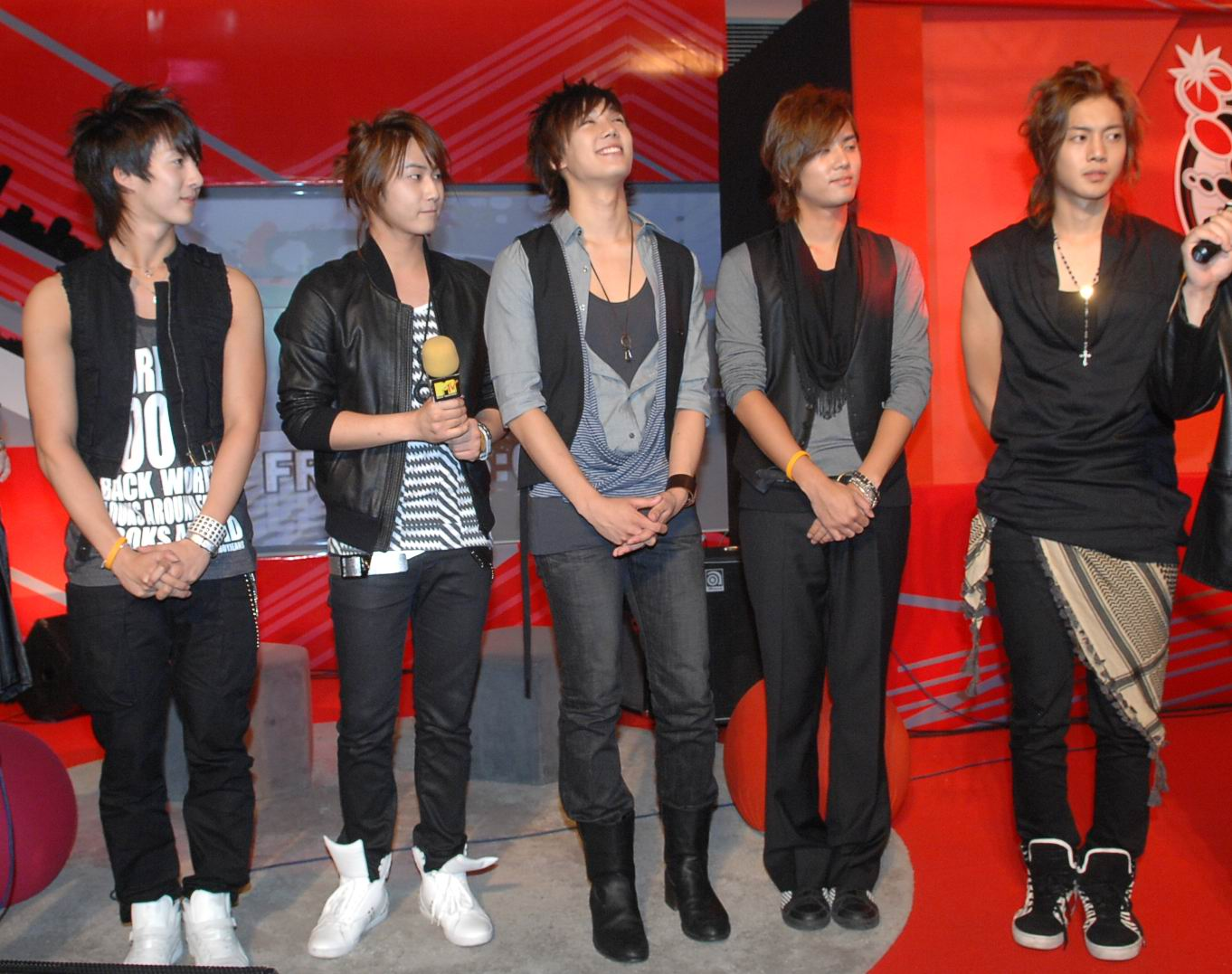
SS501 at My Style My MTV on stage (2008)

Having built their foundation as artists in both countries, they continually released singles and albums back-and-forth such as Deja Vu in Korea and Lucky Days in Japan, both released in 2008. However, they stopped their activities as a group for a period of time as Park Jung-Min and Kim Hyun-Joong were given solo projects for Grease musical and Boys Over Flowers series respectively. Yet, the three remaining members, with Heo as the leader, continued to promote, dubbed as the SS501 Project Group. They released a project album named U R Man in November 2008, with high tempo dance title track "UR Man". They also contributed to the Boys Over Flowers soundtrack with "내 머리가 나빠서" (Because I'm Stupid), and appeared as a cameo in episode four, performing their track "U R Man". The track won Song of the Month for February at the 32nd Cyworld Digital Music Awards on March 28, 2009, as well as the Best OST of the year during the 2009 Mnet Asian Music Awards.

On November 21, 2008, Kim joined as one of the regular hosts on MBC's God Of Cookery Expedition. In 2009-2010, SS501 released All My Love, Solo Collection, Rebirth, and Destination consecutively before their contracts ended. Kim wrote the lyrics for his solo track, "Never Let You Go", as well as the lyrics for his part of "완.두.콩." (Green Peas), a song written for their fans.

=== 2010-2011: Leaving DSP Media and solo debut ===
In June 2010, upon the expiration of SS501's contract with DSP Media, Kim along with fellow band member Heo, signed with B2M Entertainment, the agency of former DSP Media singer Lee Hyori, to embark on his solo career. Later on, Kim and Heo held a joint fan meeting, Kyu Jong & Young Saeng Story In Seoul on December 4, which continued in Hong Kong, Japan and countries across Asia.

Kim made his musical theatre debut in Goong: Musical (뮤지컬 궁), a spin-off of the television drama, in Korea. He took over the role of male lead Lee Shin, from U-Know Yunho of TVXQ. He performed this musical at Minami-za in Kyoto, Japan from June 11 to July 1, and subsequently in Seoul, Korea in September 2011.

On September 27, 2011, he released his debut solo mini album, Turn Me On with "Yesterday" as its title track It features a rap part by Heo Young-saeng in the dance track "My Love", and Yang Jiwon of Spica in the Yesterday music video. The teaser video for "Yesterday" was released on September 22.

In October 2011, Kim Kyu Jong was cast in the 36-part weekend drama, Saving Madame Go Bong Shil on cable channel CSTV. He played an aspiring musical actor named Nicky to mark his acting debut. On November 9, 2011, he performed along with other Korean and Japanese artists at the Seoul Tokyo Music Festival 2011 at Saitama Super Arena, Japan.

=== 2012-2013: "Meet Me Again" Album and Military duty ===
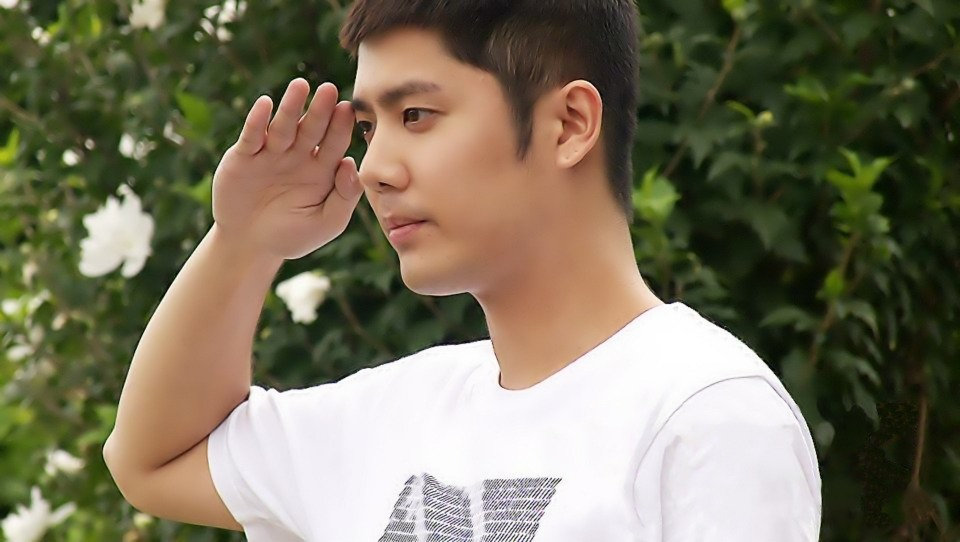
Kim saluting at Jeonju, North Jeolla Province on July 23, 2012

In June 2012, it was announced that Kim is to fulfill his mandatory military service in July. On June 3, he held his farewell fan meeting, Thank U ThanKYU with Triple S at Yonsei University in Sinchon-dong, Seoul. This marks his last official activity before his enlistment in July, as well as the first time in over two years that the five members of SS501 have gathered together. On July 23, Kim reported to the recruit training center of the 35th division in Jeonju, North Jeolla Province for four weeks of basic training. They further explained that he was originally exempted because he had a hepatitis B carrier. Since a change in conscription law, however, he was eligible to serve non-active duty as a public service worker.

On July 18, Kim released a limited edition mini-album Meet Me Again dedicated to his fans. It features three tracks including "Thank You" composed by Kim, himself and "One Luv", a duet with Mighty Mouth's Shorry J, composed by Tae Wan Kim aka C-Luv.

On March 9, Kim spent his free time attending Kim Hyung Jun's 1st solo concert, The First at the Woori Art Hall, Olympic Park, Seoul. He even went up to the stage with Kim Hyung Jun and bowed together, marking the end of the concert.

During SS501's eighth anniversary, Kim, along with the SS501 members posted one video of them celebrating and greeting their fans on each of their own official YouTube accounts. Kim Hyun Joong was not able to be in the video at that time because he had a shooting in his variety show, Barefooted Friends. However, Kim Hyun Joong still talked about their anniversary during his Korea fan meeting entitled 2013 KHJ Show - Party People, held on the same day of their anniversary.

Kim attended Heo Young-saeng's first and farewell concert in Seoul entitled 2013 Heo Young Saeng Seoul Concert 0513 My Story on October 26 at the UNIQLO AX Hall. This time, all of the SS501 members appeared together on one stage and performed together as one group again after three years. They sang their self-written song dedicated to their fans, "Green Peas", and their a cappella version of the song, "In the Still of the Night".

=== 2014-present: Military discharge, drama and musical comeback ===
On July 22, 2014, exactly two years after being enlisted in the army, Kim Kyu Jong was officially discharged from his duties. At around 9:30 to 10 am, he arrived at the military manpower office in Jeonbuk, Jeonju, and he was welcomed by the fans and press who waited for hours. Kim came back as part of KBSN's special project drama ‘S.O.S Please Save Me’ for the role of Park JungJun. Following this, he was cast at the 20th anniversary musical performance “Singin’ in the Rain for the role of DongHyun.

== Personal life ==
During the time when Kim was still serving in the military service, updates about him were only known through his friends' Twitter updates and his personal handwritten letters to his fans to show his love and appreciation. To further show his acknowledgement towards his fans, it was revealed that he joined ThanKYU's (name of his fanclub) various donation activities. On February 1, Kyu Jong sent 14 woven hats that he and his mother had personally weaved during his spare time.

== Philanthropy ==
Kim is active in donating to share his achievements to the people in need, as well as his fanclub, ThanKYU.

In 2011, Kim volunteered for a welfare activity at an animal shelter together with Heo and Lee Hyori. In the same year, Kim also donated 620 kg of rice on the "Dreame rice flower basket" company to be given to his hometown in DeokJin-gu to help the families there. He also became an ambassador of "Heart Heart Foundation", preparing food for needy children under the Warm Meals campaign and participating in the sharing/charity performance of Heart Heart Orchestra

In February 2013, Kim personally weaved hats with the help of his mother during his free time in the army. He was touched by his fans' various donation activities that he helped them weaved some, particularly 14 hats.

== Discography ==
=== EPs ===
- Turn Me On (2011)
- Meet Me Again (2012)
- Play in Nature (2018)

== Filmography ==
=== Film ===
Year	Title	Hangul	Role	Notes	Ref.
2006	Pi's Story	파이 스토리		Voice (Korea Version)	
2021	There Is an Alien Here	이 안에 외계인이 있다	Baek Ma-tan		

=== Television series ===
Year	Title	Original title	Role	Network	Notes	Ref.
2005	Nonstop 5	논스톱 5		MBC	Cameo Ep.207	
2006	Break			Mnet		
2007	Hotelier	ホテリアー	Cameo Ep.7 (with SS501)	TV Asahi	Japanese drama	
2008	Spotlight	스포트라이트		MBC	Cameo (with SS501)	
2008	Boys Over Flowers	꽃보다 남자		KBS2	Cameo Ep.4 (with Heo Young-saeng and Kim Hyung-jun)	
2009	SETI (Searching for Extra-Terrestrial Intelligence)	세티	Ho-sik	Daum	Sitcom	
2011	Pianissimo	피아니시모	Jun-su	TrendE	(Ep. "Never Ending Love")	
2011	Saving Madame Go Bong Shil	고봉실 여사 구하기	Nicky	TV Chosun		
2014	SOS Please Save Me	S.O.S 나를 구해줘	Park Jung Joon	KBS N		
2019	Different Dreams	이몽	Sung Jun Su	MBC		

=== Web drama ===
Year	Title	Role	Network	Ref.
2015	Start Love	Oh Hee-min	Naver TV Cast	
2015	28 Faces of the Moon	Kang Woo	Aura Media	

=== Variety shows ===
Year	Title	Role/Date	Network	Genre
2005	M! Countdown	MC	Mnet	Music Television Program
2008	We Got Married Season 1	recurring guest	MBC	Reality Variety Show
2008	God of Cookery Expedition	Host, November 21, 2008, to May 1, 2009	MBC	Variety Show

=== Musical theater ===
- 2011: Goong: Musical - as Lee Shin
- 2015: Singin' in the Rain - as DongHyun

=== Radio DJ ===
- from August 21, 2006: SBS Power FM - SS501's Young Street (Korean: SS501의 영스트리트)

== Bibliography ==
- December 2011: Heo Young-saeng & Kim Kyu-jong - 2012 Double Attraction (Limited Edition with DVD)
- April 2012: Photo Message Book
