= Kyonggi University =

Private higher education institution in South Korea

Coordinates: 37°18′1.7″N 127°2′9″E

- 경기대학교
- Established: 1947; 79 years ago
- President: Lee Youn Kou (이윤규)
- Location: Suwon, Gyeonggi Province; Seoul, South Korea
- Website: www.kyonggi.ac.kr

Korean name
- Hangul: 경기대학교
- Hanja: 京畿大學校
- RR: Gyeonggi daehakgyo
- MR: Kyŏnggi taehakkyo

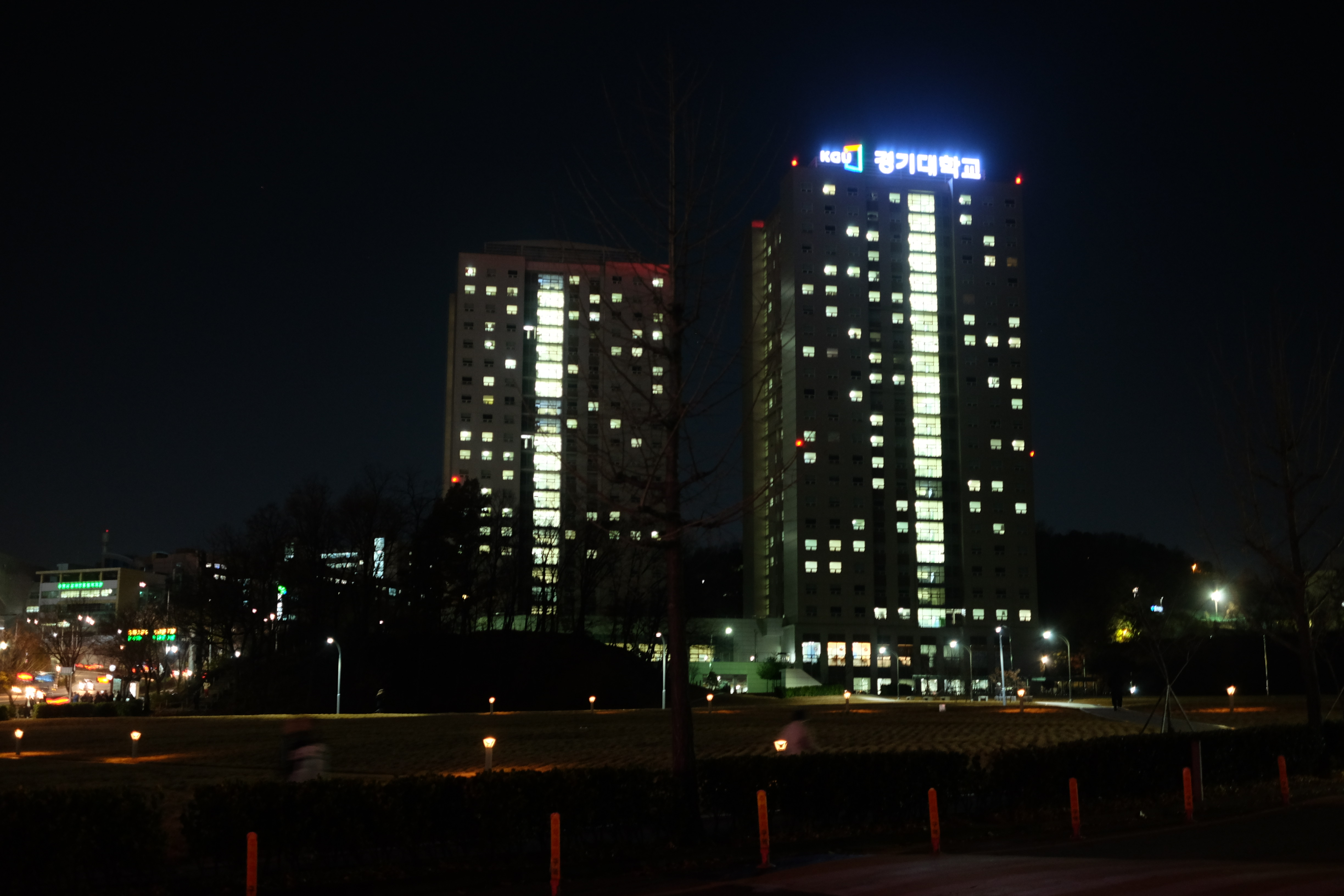
Kyonggi University at night

Kyonggi University (KGU; Korean: 경기대학교) is a private university in South Korea that was established in 1947. Originally established as a school in Seoul, it was eventually expanded and upgraded to a college and then a university. There are two campuses: the main campus in Suwon, Gyeonggi-do, and the Seoul campus in Seodaemun District. It has over 17,000 undergraduate and postgraduate students in the two campuses.

KGU has 11 colleges containing 63 programs of study and 12 graduate schools. Kyonggi University's education and research focuses on Tourism, Hospitality, Arts and Design, Business, International Studies, Environmental Engineering, and Architectural Engineering. KGU teaches some of its courses in English.

KGU has established partnership with 152 universities in 31 countries. KGU has a Korean language program. Over 650 international students study at KGU.

== History ==
Founder: Son Sang-kyo

- 1947 - Choyang Kindergarten Teacher's School
- 1957 - Kyonggi Institute
- 1964 - Kyonggi College, Seoul
- 1979 - Suwon Campus opened
- 1984 - Kyonggi College upgraded to Kyonggi University

== Departments ==
=== Undergraduate schools ===
- College of Humanities
- College of Social Sciences
- College of Law
- College of Economic and Administration
- College of Tourism Sciences
- College of Natural Sciences
- College of Engineering
- Kyonggi International College
- College of Arts
- College of Physical Sciences

=== Graduate schools ===
- Graduate School of Alternative Medicine
- Graduate School of Arts
- Graduate School of Education
- Graduate School of Engineering
- Graduate School of Hallyu
- Graduate School of Political Studies
- Graduate School of Public Administration Welfare Counseling
- Graduate School of Service Business School
- Graduate School of Tourism

== Notable alumni ==
- Cha Tae-hyun, actor
- Chae Young-in, actress
- Chun Woo-hee, actress
- Go Na-eun, actress and singer (Papaya)
- Han Jin, model
- Hwang Youn-joo, volleyball player
- Jo Sung-mo, singer
- Ju Ji-hoon, actor
- Kim Hyun-joong, actor and singer (SS501)
- Kim Hyung-jun, actor and singer (SS501 and Double S 301)
- Kim Keon Hee, businesswoman, the former First Lady of South Korea
- Kim Seung-soo, actor
- Kwon Hwa Woon, actor
- Lee Jin, actress and singer (Fin.K.L)
- Lee Tae-gon, actor
- Lee Won-jong, actor
- Nam Sang-ji, actor
- Park Jung-min, actor and singer (SS501)
- Shim Eun-jin, actress and singer (Baby V.O.X)
- Song Seung-heon, actor
- Yoon Hae-young, actress
- Yoon Ji-on, actor
- Yoon Shi-yoon, actor
- Yoon Sun-woo, actor
- Jun Jin, host and singer (Shinhwa)

== Notable faculty ==
- Park Neung-hoo, professor of social welfare, President Moon Jae-in's first Minister of Health and Welfare
- Soo Jung Lee, professor of forensic psychology
- Sung Deuk Hahm, Executive Vice President of the Seoul Campus; Naun professor of political science and law
