= CI Entertainment =

South Korean record label

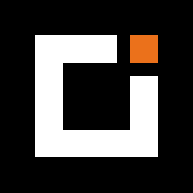
- Genre: K-pop
- Founded: August 8, 2014
- Founder: Lee Jae-young
- Headquarters: South Korea, Seoul
- Subsidiaries: C9 Entertainment (2018–present)

CI Entertainment is a South Korean record label created by Lee Jae-young in 2014. In March 2015, CI merged with actress management company "Secret society entertainment" which was managing actress Jeon So-min at the time. In June 2015, the company hosted an audition to recruit new talents. In 2018, it was announced that the company acquired 100% of the stakes of C9 Entertainment. The agency currently manages K-Pop artists such as Double S 301 and Jun Jin.

== Artists ==
=== Duos ===
- Take (2015–present)

=== Sub-units ===
- Double S 301

=== Soloists ===
- Lee Young-hyun
- Hyungjun (SS501)
- To-day(오늘)
- Jun Jin (co-managed by shinhwa company)

=== Actors and actresses ===
- Baek Seung Ryeol
- Choi Woo Ri
- Min Kyung Jin
- Jang Eun A

== Former artists ==
- Kim Dong-wan (2014-2018) (co-managed by Shinhwa Company)
- Double S 301
  - Youngsaeng (2015-2017)
  - Kyujong (2015-2018)
