= Find (SS501 EP) =

- Find album cover - normal edition

EP by SS501
- Released: July 24, 2008
- Genre: K-pop, R&B, Dance
- Language: Korean
- Label: DSP Media

SS501 chronology
Deja Vu (2008)	Find (2008)	U R Man (2008)

Find (파인드) is South Korean boy band SS501's fourth Korean mini-album. It was released after their Japanese maxi single, "Lucky Days".

The album consists of three songs, instrumental versions of the two songs, and an intro. In addition, the album includes the original and acoustic version of Kim Hyun-joong's first solo track, "Thank You" (고맙다).

Two songs in the album, "You are my heaven" and "Thank You", became theme songs of MBC's reality TV show, We Got Married, in which Kim Hyun-joong was part of the show with Hwangbo.

== Track listing ==
No.	Title	Lyrics	Length
1.	"너와 숨쉬다" (Breathing For You Intro)
2.	"넌나의천국" (You Are My Heaven)
3.	"Find"	Han Jae Ho, Kim Seung Soo
4.	"고맙다" (Thank You - Kim Hyun-joong solo)
5.	"넌나의천국" (You Are My Heaven [Inst.])
6.	"Find" ([Inst.])	Han Jae Ho, Kim Seung Soo
7.	"사랑해X5" (I Love You X 5)
8.	"고맙다" (Thank You [Acoustic Ver.] - Kim Hyun-joong solo)

== Music Videos ==
- "Find"
- "You Are My Heaven"
