= Double S 301 =

South Korean boy group

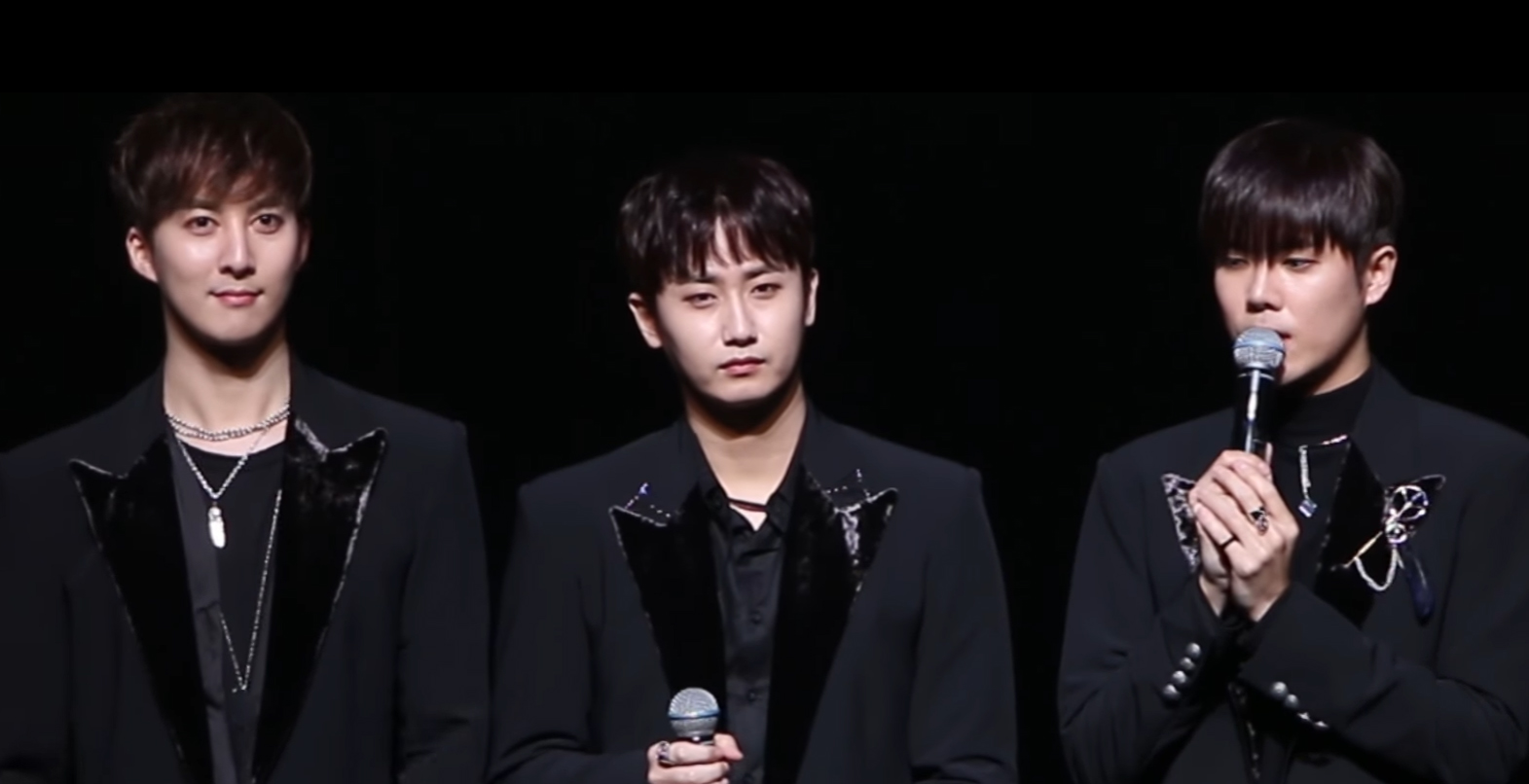
- Double S 301 in showcase 081216

Background information
- Also known as: SS301; SS501 Special Project Group
- Origin: Seoul, South Korea
- Genres: K-pop; J-pop
- Years active: 2016–2017
- Labels: DSP; CI
- Spinoff of: SS501
- Members: Heo Young-saeng; Kim Kyu-jong; Kim Hyung-jun
- Website: Official Website (JP)

Double S 301 (SS301) is a subgroup of the South Korean boy band SS501. It is composed of three SS501 members: Heo Young-saeng, Kim Kyu-jong and Kim Hyung-jun. Double S 301 made their unofficial debut under DSP Media in 2008 with the EP, "UR Man," as "SS501 Special Project Group" in the absence of SS501 members, Kim Hyun-joong and Park Jung-min. In 2015, the three members signed under CI Entertainment, who rebranded the group as Double S 301 before releasing their official debut album, Eternal 5, the following year. Member Hyungjun enlisted for mandatory military service in 2017, temporarily putting the group on hiatus. On December 29, 2018, he was officially discharged from the military, though the group has not returned since 2017.

== History ==
=== Formation ===
In 2008, both Park Jung Min and Kim Hyun Joong were given solo projects for the Grease musical and the Boys Over Flowers series, respectively. Nevertheless, the three remaining members, with Heo as the leader, continued to tour, dubbed as the SS501 Project Group. They released a project album named U R Man in November 2008, with the high-tempo dance title track "UR Man". They also contributed to the Boys Over Flowers soundtrack with "내 머리가 나빠서" (Because I'm Stupid), and appeared as a cameo in episode four, performing their track, "U R Man". The track won Song of the Month for February at the 32nd Cyworld Digital Music Awards on March 28, 2009. as well as the Best OST of the year during the 2009 Mnet Asian Music Awards.

=== 2016: Official debut as 'Double S 301', anniversary album, and tour ===
In August 2015, B2M Entertainment told MyDaily “Kim Hyung Jun, Heo Young Saeng, Kim Kyu Jong are in discussion of making a comeback as a trio sub-unit. Even though plans are not finalized yet, the members are very determined and our side is also very supportive of it.” Heo also confirmed the comeback during his 'Hello Again' fan meeting. At the time, both Hyun Joong and Jung Min were unable to participate due to their military enlistments.

On January 20, 2016, CI Entertainment said “Finally Double S 301 will make a comeback. It is a long-awaited comeback so the members’ anticipation and passion for the preparation of this album is tremendous. You can look forward to Double S 301’s new fresh look, we hope that fans can support Double S 301 for their upcoming comeback.” 'Double S 301' is the transcribed pronunciation of SS501, altered to represent the group's member loss. Also, it's a nod to SS501's Official fanclub, Triple S.

The group was set to have a concert at BLUE SQUARE Samsung Card Hall on March 19 and 20, 2016 entitled "2016 Double S 301 CONCERT〈U R MAN IS BACK〉IN SEOUL".

This marked the first major event held by SS501 since their departure from DSP Media in 2010, and their 2013 concert.

Double S 301 held its comeback showcase at Art Hall of Lotte Card Art Center on February 15 at 8pm KST, and released their official debut mini-album ETERNAL 5 on the following day. The tickets for the said concert were sold out 3 mins upon release.

Following their Korean debut, the group made their Japanese debut with "'Eternal S", followed by a concert in Tokyo and Osaka, Japan. Particularly in Tokyo Dome City Hall and Orix Theater on April 25 and 27 respectively.

In May 2016, to celebrate the group's 11th anniversary, CI Ent announced thru Twitter that Double S 301 would return with a special album.

The special album 'ESTRENO' was released on June 9, with the first comeback stage on June 8. The word means 'debut' in Spanish, which alludes to the album coming out on SS501's 11th debut anniversary.

After 6 months on hiatus, the group returned with their 2nd mini album 'Eternal 0' and 'Eternal 1' in December 2016, thus completing the "Eternal" series.

=== 2017-2018: Hyung-jun's enlistment and Unison Volume 1 ===
In February 2017, Hyung-jun began his mandatory military enlistment and is expected to return in 2019.

On June 8, Double S 301 returned with their single, Unison Volume 1, to mark SS501's 12th anniversary.

On December 29, 2018, Hyungjun was discharged from his military duty.

== Discography ==
=== Extended plays ===
Title	Album details	Peak chart positions		Sales
Title	Album details	KOR	JPN	Sales
U R Man	Released: November 21, 2008; Label: DSP Media	3	—	
Eternal 5	Released: February 16, 2016; Label: CI Entertainment, Interpark Music; Track listing: 1. Dirty Love; 2. Pain; 3. 21Gram; 4. Saxophone; 5. Sorry I’m Busy (바빠서 미안해); 6. Pain (instrumental version); 7. 21Gram (instrumental version)	2	—	KOR: 14,240+
Eternal 0 & Eternal 1	Released: December 9, 2016; Label: CI Entertainment, Interpark Music; Track listing: 1. Remove; 2. La La La; 3. My You; 4. Luv With U 5. Universe (나의)	3	—	

=== Special albums ===
Title	Album details	Peak chart positions		Sales
Title	Album details	KOR	JPN	Sales
Estreno	Released: June 9, 2016; Label: Cl Entertainment, Interpark Music; Track listing: 1. Ah-Ha (아하); 2. Shining Star; 3. Ah-Ha (아하) (instrumental version); 4. Shining Star (instrumental version)	3	—	KOR: 8,820+
Unison No.1	Released: June 8, 2017; Label: CI Entertainment, Interpark Music; Track listing: 1. Hello Mello (Korean Ver.); 2. Hello Mello (instrumental version)	—	—	

=== Japanese albums ===
Title	Album details	Peak chart positions		Sales
Title	Album details	KOR	JPN	Sales
U R Man	Released: March 25, 2009; Label: DSP Media	—N/a	—	
Eternal S	Released: April 20, 2016; Label: CI Entertainment, Pony Canyon; Track listing: 1. Bad Dimension; 2. Fraction; 3. From Dusk To Dawn; 4. Let Me Know; 5. Never Ending Dream	—N/a	12	JPN: 6,751+
S	Released: December 21, 2016; Label: CI Entertainment, Pony Canyon; Track listing: 1. Only our memories (僕らだけの想い出); 2. My Universe; 3. Luv with U 4. Remove; 5. Shining Star	—N/a	26	JPN: 5,014+
Unison No.1	Released: June 28, 2017; Label: CI Entertainment, Pony Canyon; Track listing: 1. Hello Mello; 2. Summer Love; 3. Long Night; 4. Hello Mello (instrumental version)	—N/a	63	

== Concerts and Showcase ==
- "Double S 301 CONCERT〈U R MAN IS BACK〉IN SEOUL" (March 19–20, 2016)
- "Double S 301 KCON IN UAE" ( March 25, 2016/Abu Dhabi)
- "Double S 301 CONCERT〈U R MAN IS BACK〉IN JAPAN" (April 25, 2016/Tokyo )
- "Double S 301 CONCERT〈U R MAN IS BACK〉IN JAPAN" (April 27, 2016/Osaka )
