= Soo Jung Lee =

South Korean forensic psychologist

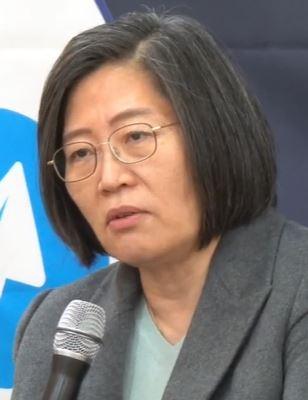
- Born: 1964 (age 61–62)
- Citizenship: South Korea
- Occupations: Forensic Psychologist and Forensic Psychology Professor

Soo Jung Lee (Korean: 이수정; born 1964) is a South Korean forensic psychologist, professor of forensic psychology at Kyonggi University in Seoul, and part of the country's first generation of criminal profilers. She has been named part of the BBC's list of 100 inspiring and influential women from around the world for 2019, in the leadership category. Lee has worked numerous high-profile murder cases and believes stalking is what leads to more serious crimes. As a result of this, she helped introduce an anti-stalking bill now passed in South Korea.

She was previously a member of the Supreme Court's Sentencing Commission, the Supreme Prosecutors' Office's sexual violence task force, and the National Police Agency's reform committee. She has since written seven books and given advice on the popular Korean TV program Unanswered Questions. In November 2021, she became the co-chairman for the election campaign committee for the People Power party. The decision for Lee's inclusion in the party was done without the approval of Lee Jun-seok, the party leader at the time.
