= SS501 Solo Collection =

- SS501 Solo Collection album cover

EP by SS501
- Released: July 21, 2009
- Genre: K-pop, R&B, Dance
- Length: 23:04
- Language: Korean
- Label: DSP Media

SS501 chronology
All My Love (2008)	SS501 Solo Collection (2009)	Rebirth (2009)

SS501 Collection is South Korean boy band SS501's sixth Korean mini-album released on July 21, 2009 by DSP Media.

This was the first album to release after the return of Kim Hyun-joong (participating in Boys Over Flowers during previous album promotions,) and Park Jung-min (who was previously participating in musical, Grease.) and SS501's project group and unit album, U R Man,

The album consists of a solo tracks for each member that showcase each member's individual talents and charisma: Kim Hyun-joong's edgy R&B dance track "Please Be Nice To Me"; Heo Young-saeng's self-written ballad song "Nameless Memory"; Kim Kyu-jong's light and energetic urban pop song "Wuss Up" featuring Taewan a.k.a. C-Luv & Star Trak; Park Jung-min's mid-tempo ballad "If You Cannot" featuring Ji-sun; and Kim Hyung-jun's sexy dance-song "Hey G". Aside from solo songs, the album also included the group song "I Won't Be A Coward" at the end, which was previously included on the Japan Version of U R Man album. Moreover, SS501 shot a sensational 20-minute blockbuster-style music video that brings the songs and members together for a thrilling musical story in which Kim Hyun-joong, Park Jung-min, and Kim Kyu-jong play rival killers.

In August 2009, SS501 released a limited and deluxe version of the album in Taiwan.

== Track listing ==
No.	Title	Lyrics	Music	Arrangement	Length
1.	"제발 잘해줘" (Please, Be Nice To Me)	Hwang Seong-je (BJJ)	Hwang Seong-je (BJJ)		03:53
2.	"이름없는 기억" (Nameless Memory)	Heo Young-saeng	Park Se-hyun	Star Trak	04:24
3.	"Wuss Up"	Tae-wan a.k.a. C-LUV	Tae-wan a.k.a. C-LUV		03:03
4.	"하면은 안돼" (If You Cannot)	Park Jung-min	Han Jae-ho, Kim Seung-su	Han Jae-ho, Kim Seung-su	04:30
5.	"Hey G"	Kim Hyung-jun (H&B)	Kim Hyung-jun (H&B)		03:37
6.	"비겁하지 않겠어" (I Won't Be A Coward)	Han Sang-won	Han Sang-won	Han Sang-won	03:17
Total length:					23:04

Limited Edition DVD - Taiwanese version
No.	Title	Length
1.	"Chinese-subtitled DVD of SS501's Music Video Drama, "殺手輓歌""
2.	""Please Be Good To Me" video teaser" (Kim Hyun-joong's solo)
3.	""Nameless Memory" video teaser" (Heo Young-saeng's solo)
4.	""Wuss Up" video teaser" (Kim Kyu-jong's solo)
5.	""If You Cannot" video teaser" (Park Jung-min's solo)
6.	""Hey G" video teaser" (Kim Hyung-jun's solo)
7.	"All SS501 members' video teaser"

== Release history ==
Country	Date	Distributing label	Format
South Korea	July 21, 2009	DSP Media	CD
Taiwan	August 2009	DSP Media	Limited Edition CD+DVD
Taiwan	August 2009	DSP Media	Deluxe Edition CD
