= Take (band) =

South Korean band

- Origin: Seoul, South Korea
- Genres: Ballad; dance
- Years active: 2003–present
- Labels: CI Entertainment; Sedona Media; Blue Entertainment
- Members: Shin Seung-hee; Jang Sung-jae
- Past members: Kim Do-wan; Lee Min-hyuk; Nathan Lee

Take (Korean: 테이크) is a South Korean duo formed by Blue Entertainment in 2003. They debuted on April 17, 2003, with 1 Story.

== Members ==
=== Current ===
- Shin Seung-hee (신승희)
- Jang Sung-jae (장성재)

=== Former ===
- Kim Do-wan (김도완)
- Lee Min-hyuk (이민혁)
- Nathan Lee (Lee Seung-hyun; 이승현)

== Discography ==
=== Studio albums ===
Title	Album details	Peak chart positions	Sales
Title	Album details	KOR	Sales
1 Story	Released: April 17, 2003; Label: Blue Entertainment, CJ E&M; Formats: CD, digital download	—	—
Take Part.1	Released: May 12, 2015; Label: CI Entertainment, LOEN Entertainment; Formats: CD, digital download	35	KOR: 406
Take Part.2	Released: July 6, 2017; Label: CI Entertainment, NHN Entertainment; Formats: CD, digital download	47	—

=== Extended plays ===
Title	Album details
To Girls	Released: June 2, 2005; Label: KT Music; Formats: CD, digital download

=== Single albums ===
Title	Album details
Take It All	Released: November 30, 2006; Label: Sedona Media, KingPin; Formats: CD, digital download

Singles

Title	Year	Peak chart positions	Sales (DL)	Album
Title	Year	KOR	Sales (DL)	Album
"Baby Baby" (베이비 베이비)	2003	—	—	Non-album singles
"One Spring Day" (어느 봄날에)	2015	58	KOR: 58,458	Take Part.1
"Rainy Day"	2015	—	—	Non-album singles
"Why"	2016	—	—	Non-album singles
"Heaven" (천국)	2016	—	—	Non-album singles
"Good-Bye" (이별이란 거, 이렇게 쉬울 줄 알았더라면...)	2016	—	—	Non-album singles
"Walk" (왈칵)	2016	—	—	Non-album singles
"—" denotes releases that did not chart.
