= SS501 =

South Korean boy band

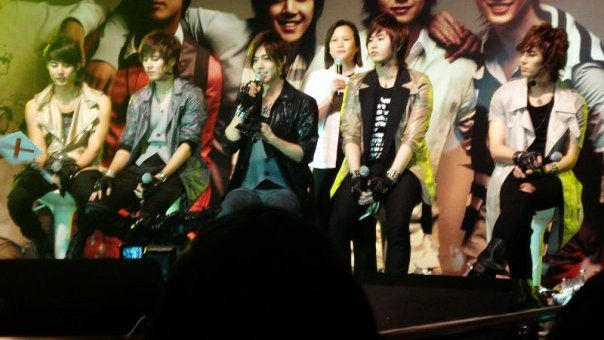
- SS501 during a fanmeeting in Hong Kong (2009); From L to R: Kim Hyung-jun, Kim Kyu-jong, Kim Hyun-joong, Heo Young-saeng, Park Jung-min

Background information
- Also known as: Double-S 501
- Origin: South Korea
- Genres: K-pop; J-pop; dance; R&B
- Years active: 2005–2010; 2016—2017 (Note: Double S 301); 2025–present (Note: As FIVE O ONE)
- Labels: DSP; Pony Canyon (Japan); Warner Taiwan; Henecia
- Spinoffs: Double S 301
- Members: Kim Hyun-joong; Heo Young-saeng; Kim Kyu-jong
- Past members: Park Jung-min; Kim Hyung-jun

SS501 (currently promoting as Five O One) is a South Korean boy band that was formed under the management of DSP Media. The group debuted on June 8, 2005, with five members: Kim Hyun-joong, Heo Young-saeng, Kim Kyu-jong, Park Jung-min and Kim Hyung-jun. They debuted in 2005 with the EP Warning, which included their first number one song, "Never Again". In 2007, SS501 entered the Japanese market with the maxi single Kokoro, which debuted at number five on the Oricon chart. The following year, in 2008, they became the first South Korean artists to win the award for Best New Artist at the Japan Gold Disc Awards. SS501 has released two studio albums and seven EPs in Korean, and two studio albums and three EPs in Japanese.

In 2010, all five members of the group left DSP Media to pursue solo careers, though leader Kim Hyunjoong confirmed they would not be disbanding. In 2016 members Heo Young-saeng, Kim Kyu-jong, and Kim Hyun-jung reunited under the name Double S 301, to release a comeback. After 9 years of SS501-related inactivity, Kim Hyun-joong, Heo Young-saeng and Kim Kyu-jong reunited in 2025 to celebrate SS501's 20th anniversary as Five O One.

== Etymology ==
The name of the band is a combination of letters and numbers that have special meaning. The first “S” stands for "superstar", the second “S” is an abbreviation for "singer", and the combination of 5, 0, and 1 symbolizes "five members united as one forever".

== History ==
=== Pre-debut ===
Before debuting with SS501, most of the members had some experience in the entertainment world.

Kim Hyun-joong was initially about to debut in a five-member group which included Han Yeon of B2Y (now disbanded) who was to be the leader and Kim would be the youngest member. During 2001 and 2002, while working as a waiter in a family restaurant located at Jamsil-dong, Kim was introduced to a new set up management company CEO. While the group underwent training together, they were asked by their company to debut in China as a Hallyu project group but they rejected the offer and disbanded.

Heo Young-saeng started as a trainee at SM Entertainment for about 2.5 years. He then joined DSP Media (formerly known as DSP Entertainment) and trained for three months before debuting as a member of SS501. According to his father, if he had stayed with SM Entertainment as a trainee, he would probably have debuted with Super Junior.

Park Jung-min was once a commercial model for condoms. When he was 13, he was scouted by an agency and was accepted by both DSP Media and S.M. Entertainment. At that time, SM Entertainment told him that they were preparing a new group but the group consisted of many members. According to Park, this was probably Super Junior since he saw them rehearsing too.

Kim Hyung-jun appeared on Ock Joo-hyun's music video, "Catch" in 2004. He was also the first one to be included in SS501 which means he had the longest training period.

In addition, SS501 has had their first variety show before they officially debuted entitled SS501 M!Pick by MNET. It documented their pre-debut days and the three months after their debut.

=== 2005–06: Debut ===
SS501 debuted on June 8, 2005 along with their first EP, Kyeonggo (Korean: "경고", "Warning");. Their second mini album, Snow Prince was released in late 2005, five months after their debut. The group earned popularity right away as they won many rookie awards after their debut.

The group was inactive in Korea for most of 2006, although they had their first fan meeting in Japan in April of that year. The reason was due to Heo Young Saeng's throat condition, which required a surgery, thus resulting in a need for time to fully recover. In mid-2006, they held their first successful concert, "Step Up Concert" in Osaka, Japan. In late 2006, they returned to Korea in order to promote their first studio album, which was released on November 10 entitled S.T 01 Now. Singles from the album included "Unlock" and "Four Chance". Alongside promoting the album on various variety and music shows, they also filmed a show on MNet, which was called SS501 SOS. The group (excepting Heo Young Saeng, who was recovering from the surgery) also lent their voices for the 2006 animated movie Pi's Story.

=== 2007–08: Breakthrough success, Japanese debut, Boys Over Flowers, and sub-unit ===
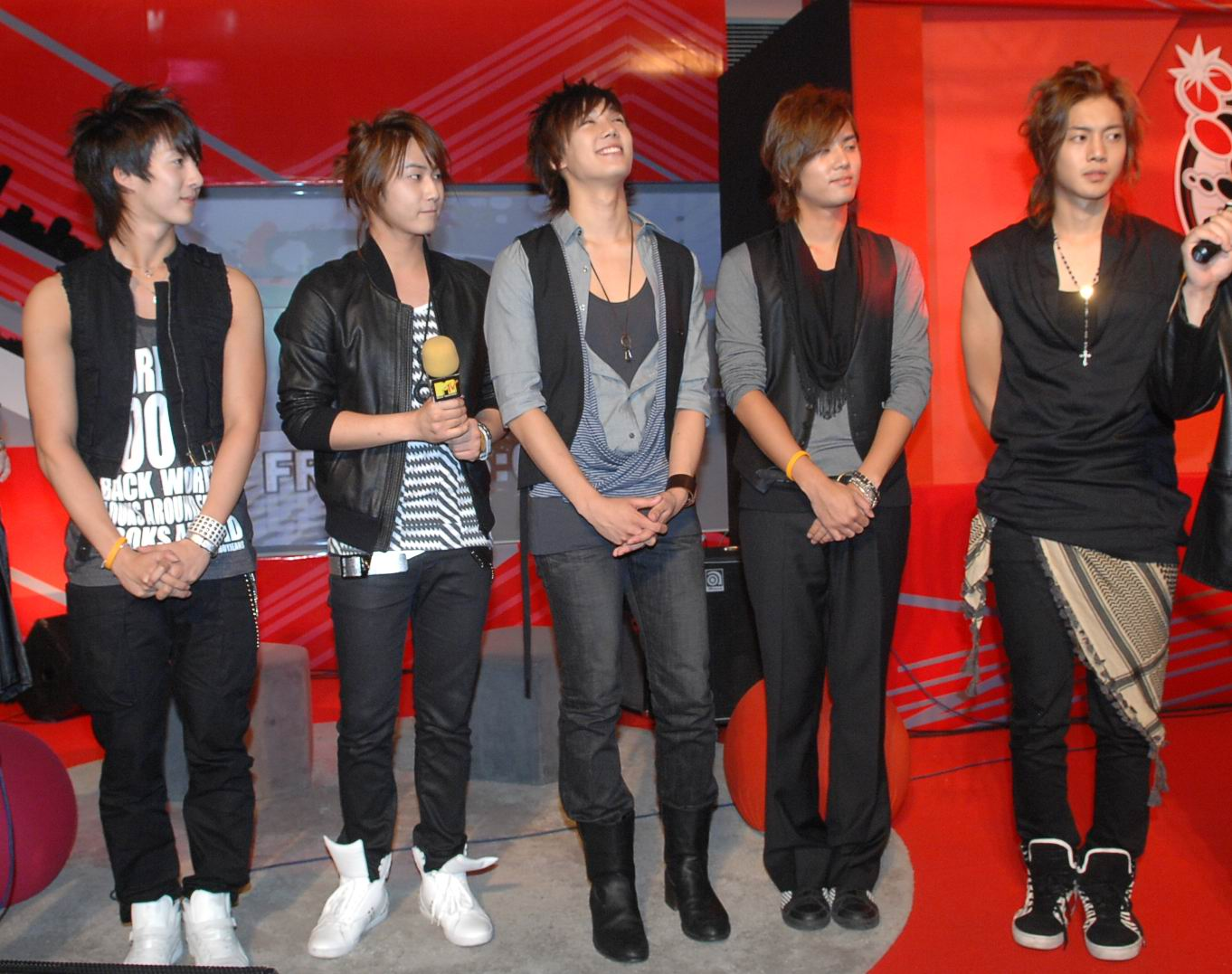
SS501 at My Style My MTV on stage (2008)

Later in 2007, the group debuted in the Japanese market to further spread their activities and challenge themselves outside Korea. The group at this time released their Japanese single Kokoro, alongside multiple versions, including one with all members and five featuring each member individually. The single debuted at the 5th spot on the Oricon chart, and moved to 3rd spot the next day. It was also chosen as an ending theme song for an anime entitled Blue Dragon.

SS501 appeared in the Japanese drama Hotelier as a cameo seen in episode seven. Later in September, SS501 released their second single in Japan entitled Distance. Finally in October 24, a month later, a full album was released with their self-titled album, SS501. SS501 also received the "Newcomer Award" by Japan Gold Disc Award in January 2008; this was the first time for Korean artists to receive this award.

SS501 returned to Korea with their single Deja Vu, which was released on March 13, 2008. The title track was the first song to be promoted, and they began their comeback on music channel M.Net's M Countdown. After their success with their single "Deja Vu", they began to promote their second single, "A Song Calling for You". They performed their Goodbye Stage on Music Bank in June 2008, to return to Japanese activities. Their third Japanese single was released on June 18, 2008 entitled Lucky Days. Then, for a short period of time, they return in Korea and released a mini album entitled, Find.

On October 4, the group represented Korea to perform at the Seoul World Cup Stadium, and received the Best Asian Artist Award at the 5th Asia Song Festival, organised by Korea Foundation for International Culture Exchange.

On October 2, 2008, Kim Hyun-joong was cast for his first lead-acting role as 'Yoon Ji-hoo' in the Korean version of Hana Yori Dango, named Boys Over Flowers, a role for which he won the "Most Popular Actor Award" at the Seoul International Drama Awards 2009 and the "Popularity Award" at the 45th Baeksang Arts Awards. The series was broadcast on KBS during the first half of 2009. During this time, around early 2009, Park Jung-min was also cast for his musical debut in Grease as "Danny Park", where he received the award "Best New Musical Talent" by the Golden Ticket Awards. While both Kim and Park were busy with their schedules, the remaining three members formed 'SS501 Project Group' with Heo Young-saeng as the leader. The 'Project Group' was initially to be named after their fan club 'Triple S', however before the sub-unit group debut it was decided to retain 'SS501' name out of respect to the absent members. They released a project album named U R Man in November 2008, with a high tempo dance track "U R Man", which the three remaining SS501 members promoted by themselves, with the exception of some special performances that included all five band members. The project group also performed "U R Man" in episode four of Boys Over Flowers, where they appeared for a cameo performance. Moreover, they contributed to the Boys Over Flowers soundtrack with "내 머리가 나빠서" (Because I'm Stupid) track, in which they received multiple awards such as "Song of the Month (February)", "Best OST Award", and "Best TV Drama Song of the Year" just to name a few.

=== 2009–10: EPs, first Asian tour, leaving DSP Media ===
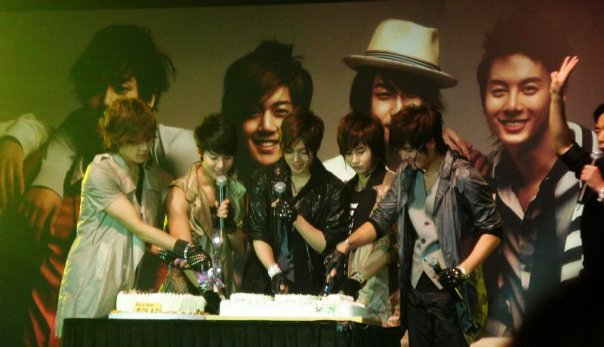
SS501 during a fan meeting in Hong Kong (2009)

SS501 released their official second Japanese studio album, All My Love, on May 13, 2009. Although they were doing a cappella performances during their past years, it was their first time to record and include an a cappella title track to their album, "All My Love". A promotional tour was held in Japan in support of the album.

On July 21, 2009, they released their sixth EP, Solo Collection, which consisted of the individual members' songs. It also includes a mini-drama starring SS501, particularly Kim Hyun-joong and Park Jung-min. In August 2009, they embarked on their 1st Asia Tour Persona, with two concerts in Seoul. It was followed by fifteen concerts in Japan, Taiwan, Hong Kong, Thailand, China, Malaysia, and Singapore.

The group's seventh EP Rebirth was released in two parts: in a limited and a full edition. The former was released on October 20, and the latter on October 22. SS501 promoted the album with the single "Love Like This", a track collaborated by Steven Lee, Sean Alexander, and Drew Ryan Scott. The single was also sung by Varsity Fanclub, Scott's group, in English lyrics with the same title single, which was released later in 2010.

In 2010, SS501 continued their 1st Asia Tour Persona concert in Thailand before holding their final encore concert, on February 27, in Seoul to conclude the tour. Although the release of a new EP was planned for May 1, 2010 (a nod towards "501" in the group's name, or as they call it "501" day), the date was pushed back in order to "add finishing touches". They performed at the 2010 Dream Concert later that month. Because Kim Hyun-joong was still recovering from a previous injury, they sang two ballads instead of the rumored comeback track.

Their last EP before the contract's expiration, entitled Destination, was released on May 24, 2010. The lead track, "Love Ya", composed by Steven Lee, is a song accompanied by an orchestra, and blended with a piano melody. Their first win for the lead track, "Love Ya", was on KBS' Music Bank, on June 11. On June 18, DSP announced that SS501 would end their "Love Ya" promotions due to the expiration of their contract on June 7, 2010, five years after their debut.

During the second half of 2010, upon the expiration of the group's contract with DSP Media, all the members signed with other management companies. Kim Hyun-joong signed with KeyEast, Park Jung-min joined CNR Media, Kim Hyung-jun with S-Plus Entertainment. Heo Young-saeng and Kim Kyu-jong both signed with B2M Entertainment.

Kim Hyun-joong explained in an interview that, at the time, there wasn't a company that would accept them as a whole, thus the group decided to take the chance to focus on their solo activities. In October 2010, Kim Hyung-jun announced that SS501 was planning release a new album in 2011 but was pushed back, probably because of their busy schedules.

=== 2011–2015: Hiatus and SS501 Best Collection ===
With the group on hiatus, the members pursued solo activities.

Kim Hyun-joong joined KeyEast after leaving DSP Entertainment and started promoting both as an actor and singer. His first acting project was Korean drama Playful Kiss, that was broadcast on MBC in September 2010. He played the leading role of "Baek Seung Jo" in the drama. He then released his debut solo album Break Down on June 8, 2011 and it exceeded 70,000 pre-ordered copies in ten days. The album was certified gold in Korea and was certified platinum in Taiwan. The album also debuted at #1 in oricon weekly foreign album charts. In May 2015, Kim Hyun-joong officially enlisted for his mandatory military service.

Heo Young-saeng and Kim Kyu-jong held a joint fanmeeting, Kim Kyu-jong & Heo Young-saeng Story In Seoul on December 4, which continued in Hong Kong, Japan and countries across Asia. Heo Young-saeng was scheduled to launch his solo singing career on April 28, 2011, but had to postpone because he pulled the ligaments on his right hand during dance practice. His debut solo mini album, Let It Go was released on May 12, 2011, which features Kim Kyu-jong and Hyuna of girl group 4minute. The album peaked at number one on Gaon's album chart for the week starting on May 8, 2011. In November and December, Heo made his theatrical musical debut in The Three Musketeers. Afterwards on December 28, just before the end of the year, Heo released a soundtrack song entitled "The Words On My Lips" for Fermented Family, a Korean drama. Later in 2012, Heo joined the cast of KBS2 sitcom I Need a Fairy (or Sent From Heaven) in episode 23, playing the role "Heo Young Saeng/ Kaki". A month later, he released a soundtrack of the said drama entitled "Love Song". Heo Young Saeng enlisted in the army on October 31, 2013. After serving his mandatory military service as a police officer, he was discharged on July 30, 2015.

Kim Kyu-jong made his musical debut in Goong: Musical, playing the lead role of Crown Prince Lee Shin, in Kyoto, Japan from June 11 to July 1, and debuted as a solo artist in September 2011 with mini album Turn Me On. The album features rap by Heo Young-saeng in dance track "My Love", and Yang Jiwon of Spica in Yesterday music video. On July 23, Kim reported to the recruit training center of the 35th division in Jeonju, North Jeolla Province for four weeks of basic training. They further explained that he was originally exempted because he has a hepatitis B carrier. However, since there was a change in the conscription law, he was eligible to serve non-active duty as a public service worker. On July 18, Kim released a limited edition, and later on a normal edition, mini-album Meet Me Again dedicated to his fans before his enlistment.

Park Jung-min's comeback single, Not Alone, was originally planned to be released on November 25, 2010, but was pushed back to January 20, 2011. He, then, released his first mini-album The, Park Jung Min on April 1, 2011. Park was cast in a Japanese musical Bonds Of Boys as an exchange student from November 18 to 23, 2011. He also expanded his experience in acting by being cast in the Japanese drama, Love Song in August. He also contributed to KBS2's The Princess' Man OST in August, where he sang "Missing You" composed by Park Jung Wook.

Kim Hyung-jun signed with Avex Entertainment for his Japanese activities in January 2011. On March 8, 2011, Kim finally released his debut solo mini album My Girl with music videos for the two lead tracks "oH! aH!" and "Girl", in which Park Jung-min visited him during the music video shoot for the latter. A Japanese version was released on April 6, 2011 with two bonus tracks of Japanese versions of the two lead tracks. On July 27, Kim released his first Japanese single, Long Night. In October 2011, Kim made his theater debut in the romantic comedy musical Caffeine, where he played as a barista. After his acting debut on Black City, Kim starred on his first main lead role in KBS Drama's romantic comedy series, My Shining Girl in March, playing the role of "Kang-min".

During SS501's eight anniversary, SS501 members posted the same video on YouTube together to celebrate and greet their fans. Kim Hyun Joong was not able to be in the video at that time because he had a shooting on his variety show, Barefoot Friends. However, Kim Hyun Joong still talked about his debut on his Korea fanmeeting entitled 2013 KHJ Show - Party People, held at the same day of their anniversary.

On October 26, 2013, Heo had his first and farewell concert in Seoul entitled "2013 Heo Young Saeng Seoul Concert 0513 My Story", which marked the first time that all five members of SS501 appeared together on one stage and performed together as a group again after three years, as seen at the UNIQLO AX Hall.

In 2014, SS501 released "SS501 Best Collection" album in Japan on September. The compilation set features a total of two albums, one featuring their greatest Korean-language hits and the other featuring their Japanese-language hits. Volume One features 26 Korean-language songs. It comes with a bonus DVD containing 16 music videos while, Volume Two features 17 Japanese-language songs. It comes with a bonus DVD containing three music videos and additional bonus content. September 2, both "SS501 Best Collection" versions ranked on the Oricon Albums Chart at number eleven and thirteen respectively. Later that year, Kyujong was discharged from the military.

On January 17, 2015, SS501's special project group consisting of Young Saeng, Kyu Jong, and Hyung Jun performed on stage together at the Musical & Talk Concert, organized by the Seoul Police Promotional Team, which is where Heo Young Saeng had performed his military duties.

It was confirmed on September 2, 2015 that the trio sub-unit would return.

=== 2016–present: Double S 301, and reunion as Five O One ===
On January 20, 2016, CI Entertainment confirmed that SS501's special project group would debut as Double S 301. The group held its comeback showcase at Art Hall of Lotte Card Art Center on February 15 at 8pm KST, and released their official debut mini-album ETERNAL 5 on the following day.

In February 2017, Hyung-jun began his mandatory military enlistment and is expected to return in 2019. Kim Hyun Joong returned from his enlistment shortly after. On July 1, Jungmin completed his service.

On December 29, 2017, Youngsaeng announced that the group had reunited in Japan (minus Hyung jun, who was still serving military,) to discuss plans for a reunion album in 2018. Jungmin also announced that all 4 members had so far agreed, and planned to release it following Hyung jun's return.

On December 29, 2018, Hyungjun was discharged from the military, and announced he would join the group's discussions regarding a comeback. Plans for a reunion in 2020 did not proceed due to scheduling conflicts among the members.

On October 2, 2020, Youngsaeng and Kyujong held a performance under the SS501 name in celebration of Chuseok alongside U-Kiss, Narsha, Teen Top, and T-ara.

On May 1, 2025, Henecia announced that Kim Hyun-joong, Heo Young-saeng and Kim Kyu-jong will reunite as Five O One for the group's 20th anniversary and will start their world tour in July. On December 18, Five O One released a new single titled "Last Christmas," in celebration of the group's 20th anniversary. On March 7, 2026, the group released their second Korean studio album, Set it Off.

== Artistry ==
Although most of their music is composed by various people, the members of SS501 have also contributed to their albums. Five of them wrote the lyrics for "Green Peas" from Rebirth Album dedicated especially to their fans. Kim Hyung-jun and his brother, Kim Ki-bum, formerly of U-KISS, composed, under the name "H&B", the songs: "Want It", "The One", "I AM" from U R Man Album and "Hey G" from Solo Collection Album. Kim Hyung-jun also wrote the lyrics of the song "Obsess" in their Rebirth album. Heo Young-saeng composed his solo song "Is It Love?" from Solo Collection Album and wrote the lyrics of "Until Forever", one of the tracks in SS501's album Destination. Park Jung-min composed the song "Kiss" which is sung by Rainbow from Gossip Girl Album, where he performed the song at their Persona concert. He also wrote the lyrics of Not Alone and contributed to all the other songs from his album. He wrote lyrics in Japanese and sang the song "Your Colour" himself for his new mobile drama for LISMO Channel in Japan entitled Love Song In August.

== Members ==
Current

- Kim Hyun-joong (2005–2010, 2013, 2025–present)
- Heo Young-saeng (2005–2010, 2013, 2020, 2025–present) (Note: Youngsaeng, Kyujong, and Hyungjun promoted as Double S 301 from 2016–2017.)
- Kim Kyu-jong (2005–2010, 2013, 2020, 2025–present)

Former

- Park Jung-min (2005–2010; 2013)
- Kim Hyung-jun (2005–2010; 2013)

== Discography ==
- S.T 01 Now (2006)
- SS501 (2007)
- All My Love (2009)
- Set it Off (2026)

== Radio ==
- 2006–2007: SS501's Youngstreet – Kim Kyu-jong, Park Jung-min and Heo Young-saeng
- 2009–2014: Music High – Kim Hyung-jun

== Bibliography ==
- 2008: PHOTO501 --- photo book
- 2009: Endless Melody --- photo book

== Tours and concerts ==
=== Step Up concert ===
- In Seoul, South Korea (July 22, 2006)
- In Busan, South Korea (August 5, 2006)
- In Daegu, South Korea (August 12, 2006)
- In Osaka, Japan (September 16–17, 2006)

=== SS501 Special Event Tour 'Heart to Heart' ===
- In Sapporo, Japan (September 5, 2007)
- In Nagoya, Japan (September 10, 2007)
- In Osaka, Japan (September 12, 2007)
- In Fukuoka, Japan (September 14, 2007)
- In Tokyo, Japan (September 18–19, 2007)

=== SS501 2008 Japan Tour Grateful Days… Thanks For ===
- In Tokyo, Japan (July 12–13, 2008)
- In Osaka, Japan (July 16–17, 2008)

=== 1st Asia Tour Persona ===
- In Seoul, South Korea (August 1–2, 2009)
- In Tokyo, Japan (August 13, 2009)
- In Taipei, Taiwan (October 17, 2009)
- In Shanghai, China (November 14, 2009)
- In Hong Kong (December 12, 2009)
- In Bangkok, Thailand (February 13, 2010)
- Encore in Seoul, South Korea (February 27–28, 2010 at Olympic Gymnastics Arena)

=== Concerts ===
- 4th Annual Korean Music Festival in Los Angeles, California, USA (2006)
- SS501 1st full album release commemorative concert in Seoul, South Korea ( December 27, 2006)
- SS501 Live in Japan 2007 in Tokyo, Japan (January 13–14, 2007)
- SS501 Concert in Shanghai, China (February 17, 2008)
- SS501 Showcase with Triple S – Olympic Fencing Gymnasium, Seoul (November 15, 2008)
- Victory Concert in Los Angeles, California, USA (2009)
- 7th Annual Korean Music Festival in Los Angeles, California, USA (2009)
- SS501 Special Concert in Saitama Super Arena (April 25, 2010)
- SS501 Newton X-Concert in Seoul, South Korea (June 13, 2010)

=== Five O One: 20th Anniversary World Tour ===
- In Seoul, South Korea (12–13 July 2025)
- In Tokyo, Japan (5–6 September 2025)
- In Osaka, Japan (11–12 January 2026)
- In Hong Kong (31 January 2026)
- Encore in Seoul, South Korea (7–8 March 2026)
- Encore in Yokohama, Japan (8–9 May 2026)

== Awards and nominations ==
Name of the award ceremony, year presented, category, nominee, and result of the nomination
Award ceremony	Year	Category	Nominee / Work	Result	Ref.
Cyworld Digital Music Awards	2009	Original Soundtrack Award	"Because I'm Stupid"	Won	
Cyworld Digital Music Awards	2009	Song of the Month – February	"Because I'm Stupid"	Won	
Golden Disc Awards	2009	Digital Bonsang	"Because I'm Stupid"	Nominated	
Japan Gold Disc Award	2008	The Best 10 New Artists	SS501	Won	
MBC Gayo Daejejeon	2005	Best New Male Artist	SS501	Won	
Mnet Asian Music Awards	2005	Best New Group	"Warning"	Won	
Mnet Asian Music Awards	2006	Best Dance Performance	"Snow Prince"	Won	
Mnet Asian Music Awards	2006	Best Male Group	"Snow Prince"	Nominated	
Mnet Asian Music Awards	2007	Best Male Group	"4Chance"	Nominated	
Mnet Asian Music Awards	2009	Best Male Group	"UR Man"	Nominated	
Mnet Asian Music Awards	2009	Best OST	"Because I'm Stupid"	Won	
SBS Gayo Daejeon	2005	Best New Male Artist	SS501	Won	
SBS Gayo Daejeon	2006	Netizen Popularity Award	SS501	Won	
Seoul Music Awards	2008	Main Prize (Bonsang)	SS501	Won	
Seoul Music Awards	2008	K-Wave Special Award	SS501	Won	
