= SS501 (album) =

- SS501 album cover - normal edition

Studio album by SS501
- Released: October 24, 2007
- Genre: J-pop, R&B, Dance
- Language: Japanese
- Label: Pony Canyon

SS501 chronology
| S.T 01 Now (2006) | SS501 (2007) | Déjà Vu (2007) |

Singles from SS501
- 1. "Kokoro" Released: August 1, 2007; 2. "Distance" Released: September 19, 2007

SS501 is South Korean boy band SS501's first full-length Japanese studio album.

Right after their first two Japanese maxi singles Kokoro and Distance, SS501 released their first full-length Japanese self-titled album, SS501 on October 24, 2007, by Pony Canyon.

The album consists of eleven songs: two singles from their first two maxi singles, "Kokoro" and "Distance"; two Japanese versions of "Again" and "4Chance" from their S.T 01 Now Korean studio album; and seven new songs.

== Track listing ==
| No. | Title | Lyrics | Music | Arrangement | Length |
|---|---|---|---|---|---|
| 1. | "Live!" | 市川喜康[KABUKI] | 村太知[KABUKI] | 市川喜康[KABUKI] |
| 2. | "Distance" (〜 君とのキョリ) | 北川 暁 | 本間昭光 | 中村太知 |
| 3. | "Watch Game" (4Chance Japanese version) | クォン・ホジュン/ ハン・サンウォン（TA-S） | クォン・ホジュン/ ハン・サンウォン（TA-S） | Jin Nakamura |
| 4. | "ホンとに好きだった" (Honto Ni Sukidatta) | コモリタミノル | コモリタミノル | コモリタミノル |
| 5. | "No Exit Days" | 依布サラサ | 山沢大洋 | 武藤星児 |
| 6. | "Again" (Japanese version) | シン・ユ（Shin-U） | ファン・ソンジェ（BJJ） | 水上裕規 |
| 7. | "Boundless" | 森由里子 | 平田祥一郎 | 平田祥一郎 |
| 8. | "Butterfly" | 山本朝海 | 山沢大洋 | 武藤星児 |
| 9. | "Always And Forever" | 北川 暁 | 松本俊明 | Jin Nakamura |
| 10. | "サンセット" (Sunset) | 山本朝海 | 山沢大洋 | 武藤星児 |
| 11. | "Kokoro" | SPIN | 本間昭光 | 中村太知 |

Limited Edition CD+DVD
| No. | Title | Length |
|---|---|---|
| 1. | "clips from their debut event at Yokohoma Landmark Plaza on August 5" |

== Music videos ==
- "Kokoro"
- "Distance"

== Release history ==
| Country | Date | Distributing label | Format |
|---|---|---|---|
| Japan | October 24, 2007 | Pony Canyon | CD |
| Japan | October 24, 2007 | Pony Canyon | CD+DVD |
