= Déjà Vu (SS501 EP) =

Deja Vu
- Deja Vu album cover

EP by SS501
- Released: March 13, 2008
- Genre: K-pop, R&B, Dance
- Length: 10:25
- Language: Korean
- Label: DSP Media

SS501 chronology
SS501 (2007)	Deja Vu (2008)	Find (2008)

Music video
- "Deja Vu" on YouTube "A Song Calling For You" on YouTube

Deja Vu (데자뷰) is South Korean boy band SS501's third mini-album. It was released on March 13, 2008, three years after their second mini album. During those three years, they released their first studio album, S.T 01 Now in 2006, and had been busy focusing with Japanese activities. Therefore, this album marked their comeback in Korea.

The album contains three dance tracks, in which the lead title track, "Deja Vu" was promoted first. They, then, began to promote their second single, "A Song Calling for You" after a while. They performed their Goodbye Stage on Music Bank in June 2008, to return to Japanese activities.

== Track listing ==
No.	Title	Lyrics	Music	Length
1.	"데자뷰" (Deja Vu)	Kim Tae Hyun	Mordney (More Than Present)	03:32
2.	"널 부르는 노래" (A Song Calling For You)			03:41
3.	"Destiny"	Park Jang Geun		03:12
Total length:				10:25

== Music videos ==
- "Deja Vu"
- "A song calling for you"
