= All My Love (SS501 album) =

- All My Love album cover - limited edition

Studio album by SS501
- Released: May 13, 2009
- Recorded: 2008–2009
- Genres: J-pop, R&B, dance
- Language: Japanese
- Label: Pony Canyon

SS501 chronology
U R Man (2008)	All My Love (2009)	SS501 Solo Collection (2009)

Singles from All My Love
- 1. "Lucky Days" Released: June 18, 2008

All My Love is South Korean boy band SS501's second full-length Japanese studio album. The album was released on May 13, 2009, by Pony Canyon.

Although they were doing a cappella performances during their past years before, it was their first time to record and include an a cappella title track to their album, "All My Love". Aside from the title track, the album also consists of another twelve tracks, including their track "Lucky Days" from their Lucky Days single.

A promotional tour was held in Japan in support of the album.

== Track listing ==
No.	Title	Lyrics	Music	Arrangement	Length
1.	"メッセージ" (Message)	山本朝海	山本朝海	武藤星児	4:49
2.	"Mermaid"	山本朝海	山沢大洋	武藤星児	4:36
3.	"I Want You"	side-E	田中直	田中直	3:02
4.	"Lucky Days"	鳥海雄介	ファン・ソンジェ（BJJ）	ファン・ソンジェ（BJJ）	4:14
5.	"Get Along"	Niklas Pettersson／Vincent Digeorgio	Niklas Pettersson／Vincent Digeorgio	大西響太	3:21
6.	"Promise To Promise"	山本朝海	成本智美	江上浩太郎	5:00
7.	"Believe In Love"	side-E/ TANK	大竹智勇	B&C factory	4:00
8.	"Let's Break Away"	Hakan Lundberg/Jonas Blees/Lee Bennett	Hakan Lundberg/Jonas Blees/Lee Bennett	神津裕之	3:17
9.	"Time Of Destiny"	BOUNCEBACK	井上大介	井上大介	5:31
10.	"Lovers"	市川喜康[KABUKI]	市川喜康[KABUKI]	中村太知[KABUKI]	4:33
11.	"浅い夢の果て" (Asai Yume No Hate)	コモリタミノル	コモリタミノル	コモリタミノル	4:46
12.	"トラベラーグライダー" (Traveller Glider)	山本朝海	山沢大洋	武藤星児	5:04
13.	"All My Love" (Acapella song)	松井五郎	多胡淳	多胡淳	3:57

Limited Edition CD+DVD+SS501 Card
No.	Title	Length
1.	"Cover Shoot Footage"

== Music videos ==
- "Lucky Days"

== Release history ==
Country	Date	Distributing label	Format
Japan	May 13, 2009	Pony Canyon	CD
Japan	May 13, 2009	Pony Canyon	CD+DVD
