= Kokoro (SS501 song) =

Single by SS501
- A-side: "Lucky Days"
- B-side: "Summer Blue"/"Hoshizora"
- Released: August 1, 2007
- Genre: J-pop, R&B, dance
- Label: DSP Media, Pony Canyon

SS501 singles chronology
"Kokoro" (2007)	"Distance" (2007)

"Kokoro" is South Korean boy band SS501's debut Japanese maxi single.

The group debuted in the Japanese market after only two years since their Korean debut to further spread their activities and challenge themselves outside of Korea. They released their Japanese single "Kokoro", alongside multiple versions, including one with all members and five featuring each member individually.

Their lead track, "Kokoro" debuted at the 5th spot on the Oricon chart, and moved to 3rd spot the next day. It was also chosen as an ending theme song for an anime entitled Blue Dragon.

== Track listing ==
No.	Title	Lyrics	Music	Arrangement	Length
1.	"Kokoro"	SPIN	本間昭光	中村太知
2.	"Be A Star"	SPIN	田中直	田中直
3.	"Alice"	松井五郎	野井洋児(Yoji Noi)	大西響太
4.	"Kokoro" (Inst.)		本間昭光
5.	"Be A Star" (Inst.)		田中直
6.	"Alice" (Inst.)		野井洋児(Yoji Noi)

NOTE: For the limited editions, "Alice" and its instrumental version are replaced by the solo song and its instrumental version of each member.

Limited Edition A
No.	Title	Length
1.	"Rize Up" (Kim Hyun-joong solo)
2.	"Rize Up" (Inst.)

Limited Edition B
No.	Title	Length
1.	"Hajimete Miru Sora Datta" (Heo Young-saeng solo)
2.	"Hajimete Miru Sora Datta" (Inst.)

Limited Edition C
No.	Title	Length
1.	"Hikari" (Kim Kyu-jong solo)
2.	"Hikari" (Inst.)

Limited Edition D
No.	Title	Length
1.	"Here" (Park Jung-min solo)
2.	"Here" (Inst.)

Limited Edition E
No.	Title	Length
1.	"Sayonara ga Dekinai" (Kim Hyung-jun solo)
2.	"Sayonara ga Dekinai" (Inst.)

== Music videos ==
- "Kokoro"

== Release history ==
Country	Date	Distributing label	Format
Japan	August 1, 2007	Pony Canyon	CD
Japan	August 1, 2007	Pony Canyon	Limited Edition A
Japan	August 1, 2007	Pony Canyon	Limited Edition B
Japan	August 1, 2007	Pony Canyon	Limited Edition C
Japan	August 1, 2007	Pony Canyon	Limited Edition D
Japan	August 1, 2007	Pony Canyon	Limited Edition E
