= Rebirth (EP) =

- Rebith album cover - normal edition

EP by SS501
- Released: October 20, 2009
- Genre: K-pop, R&B, Dance
- Length: 19:24
- Language: Korean
- Label: DSP Media
- Producer: Steven Lee

SS501 chronology
SS501 Solo Collection (2009)	Rebirth (2009)	Destination (2010)

Music video
- "Love Like This" on YouTube

Rebirth is South Korean boy band SS501's seventh Korean mini-album released on October 20, 2009 by DSP Media.

After SS501 project unit's U R Man and SS501 Solo Collection's album, Rebirth is SS501's first K-Pop album in over one and a half years. It was released in two parts: in a limited and a full edition. The former was released on October 20, while the latter on October 22.

SS501 promoted the album with the single "Love Like This", a track collaborated by Steven Lee, Sean Alexander, and Drew Ryan Scott. The single was also sung by Varsity Fanclub, Scott's group, in English lyrics with the same title single, which was released later in 2010.

Rebirth was the 3rd best-selling album of 2009 in South Korea, after Super Junior's Sorry, Sorry and G-Dragon's Heartbreaker.

== Track listing ==
No.	Title	Lyrics	Music	Arrangement	Length
1.	"Wasteland"	Park Se-hyun	Steven Lee, Sean Alexander	Steven Lee, Sean Alexander	04:03
2.	"Love Like This (네게로)" (For You)	Park Hae-in	Steven Lee, Sean Alexander, Drew Ryan Scott	Steven Lee, Sean Alexander, Drew Ryan Scott	02:46
3.	"하루만" (Only One Day)	Lee Seung-jae	Steven Lee	Steven Lee	05:05
4.	"Obsess (중독...)"	Kim Hyung-jun (H&B)	Steven Lee, Sean Alexander, Jimmy Burney	Steven Lee, Sean Alexander, Jimmy Burney	03:35
5.	"완.두.콩." (Green Peas)	SS501	Steven Lee	Steven Lee	04:35
Total length:					19:24

Taiwan version Limited Edition - DVD+Photobook
No.	Title	Length
1.	"Love Like This" (music video)
2.	"Love Like This" (making of footage)
3.	"Love Like This" (album teaser)

Taiwan version Limited Edition Version A+SS501 file folder A
No.	Title	Length
1.	"Love Like This" (music video)
2.	"Love Like This" (making of footage)
3.	"Love Like This" (album teaser)

== Music videos ==
- "Love Like This"

== Release history ==
Country	Date	Distributing label	Format
South Korea	October 20, 2009	DSP Media	Limited Edition CD
South Korea	October 22, 2009	DSP Media	CD
Taiwan	November 2009	DSP Media	Limited Edition CD+DVD
Taiwan	December 2009	DSP Media	Limited Edition Version 1
Taiwan	November 2009	DSP Media	Limited Edition Version 2
