= U R Man =

2008 EP by SS501

U R Man special album
- Limited edition cover

EP by SS501 (credited as SS501 Special Project Group)
- Released: November 21, 2008
- Genre: K-pop, R&B, Dance
- Length: 19:20
- Language: Korean
- Label: DSP Media

SS501 (credited as SS501 Special Project Group) chronology
Find (2008)	U R Man special album (2008)	All My Love (2009)

Music video
- "U R Man" on YouTube

U R Man is South Korean boy band SS501's fifth Korean mini-album and the unofficial debut album of Double S 301, (credited then as SS501 Special Project Group.) It released on November 21, 2008 by DSP Media and published by MNET media. It is the only SS501 album not to feature members Park Jung-min and Kim Hyun-joong.

With Kim Hyun-joong busy filming with Boys Over Flowers, and Park Jung Min with his musical debut in Grease as "Danny Park", the remaining three members formed 'SS501 Project Group' with Heo Young-saeng as the leader. They released a project album named U R Man in November 2008, with a high tempo dance track "U R Man", which the three remaining SS501 members promoted by themselves, with the exception of some special performances that included all five band members. The project group also performed "U R Man" in episode four of Boys Over Flowers, where they appeared for a cameo performance.

In addition with the title track, "U R Man", the album also includes the members' first solo songs: "Is It Love?", "Never Let You Go", and "I Am".

In March 2009, SS501 released a limited edition album in Japan, which comes with four additional tracks not included in the Korea version.

== Track listing ==
No.	Title	Lyrics	Music	Arrangement	Length
1.	"Want It"	Kim Hyung-jun (H&B), Lee Seung-jae	Carlos Battey, Steven Battey, Andrew Lane, Shaine Freeman	Andrew Lane, Sensei	02:27
2.	"U R Man"	Han Sang-won, Im Young	Han Sang-won	Han Sang-won	03:20
3.	"The One"	Kim Hyung-jun (H&B), Lee Seung-jae, Ko Ki-tae	Wayne Milton, Jenson Vaughan	Wayne G.	03:30
4.	"사랑인거죠" (Is It Love? - Heo Young-saeng solo)	Heo Young-saeng	Heo Young-saeng	Shin Seung-ho	04:00
5.	"Never Let You Go" (Kim Kyu-jong solo)	Kim Kyu-jong (J.Dream)	Jeon-gun	Jeon-gun	02:59
6.	"I Am..." (Kim Hyung-jun solo)	Kim Hyung-jun (H&B)	Han Jae-ho, Kim Seung-su	Han Jae-ho, Kim Seung-su	03:44
Total length:					19:20

Japanese Version
No.	Title	Length
1.	"卑怯者にはならない (I Won't Be A Coward)"
2.	"Sometime"
3.	"U R Man [Remix Ver.]"
4.	"The One [Remix Ver.]"

== Music videos ==
- "U R Man"

== Release history ==
Country	Date	Distributing label	Format
South Korea	November 21, 2008	DSP Media	CD
Japan	March 2009	DSP Media	Limited CD
