= Hotelier (Japanese TV series) =

- Genre: Drama
- Starring: Aya Ueto; Naomi Nishida; Seiichi Tanabe; Mikihisa Azuma; Yuki Sato
- Country of origin: Japan
- Original language: Japanese

Production
- Running time: 54 minutes

Original release
- Network: TV Asahi
- Release: April 19 – June 14, 2007

Hotelier (ホテリアー) is a Japanese television drama series based on the South Korean TV series of the same name.

== Cast ==
- Aya Ueto as Odagiri Kyoko
- Naomi Nishida as Ueda Natsuko
- Seiichi Tanabe as Ogata Kouhei
- Mikihisa Azuma as Iwama Takehiko
- Yuki Sato as Kitano Yosuke
- Kim Hyun-joong as SS501 member
