= Snow Prince (EP) =

- Snow Prince album cover

EP by SS501
- Released: December 5, 2005
- Genre: K-pop
- Length: 17:29
- Language: Korean
- Label: DSP Media

SS501 chronology
Warning (2005)	Snow Prince (2005)	S.T 01 Now (2006)

Snow Prince is South Korean boy band SS501's second mini-album. It was released six months after their debut, on December 5, 2005 by DSP Media. The album has a winter season-themed feeling, particularly their lead track, "Snow Prince".

The next year, 2006, their single, "Snow Prince" received two music program awards on M! Countdown for two weeks: January 5 and 19.

== Track listing ==
No.	Title	Lyrics	Music	Length
1.	"하얀사람" (White Person)	Lee Byung-jun	Lee Byung-jun	03:21
2.	"My Girl"	Bang Seung-cheol	Bang Seung-cheol	04:17
3.	"Snow Prince"	Shin-U	Hwang Seong-je (BJJ)	03:24
4.	"In Your Smile"	Lee Byung-jun	Lee Byung-jun	03:34
5.	"Fighter"	Ahn Young-min	Jo Young-su	03:33
Total length:				17:29

== Music videos ==
- "Snow Prince"
- "Fighter"
