= Distance (SS501 song) =

"Distance～君とのキョリ"
- "Distance～君とのキョリ" cover - CD+DVD limited edition

Single by SS501
- A-side: "Distance～君とのキョリ"
- B-side: "Gleaming Star"/"Wonderful World"
- Released: September 19, 2007
- Genre: J-pop; R&B; dance
- Label: DSP Media, Pony Canyon

SS501 singles chronology
"Kokoro" (2007)	"Distance～君とのキョリ" (2007)	"Lucky Days" (2008)

"Distance～君とのキョリ" is South Korean boy band SS501's second Japanese maxi single. It was released barely a month after their successful first single, Kokoro.

The album consists of three songs, "Distance～君とのキョリ", "Gleaming Star", "Wonderful World", and an instrumental version of each track. For the limited edition, they included the Japanese version of "Coward" from their first Korean studio album, S.T 01 Now.

== Track listing ==
No.	Title	Length
1.	"Distance～君とのキョリ"
2.	"Gleaming Star"
3.	"Wonderful World"
4.	"Distance～君とのキョリ" (Inst.)
5.	"Gleaming Star" (Inst.)
6.	"Wonderful World" (Inst.)

NOTE: For the limited editions, "Wonderful World" track is not available.

Limited Edition CD+ trading card
No.	Title	Length
1.	"弱虫～臆病な僕 (Yowamushi~Okubyou na Boku)" (Japanese version of "Coward")
2.	"弱虫～臆病な僕" (Inst.)

Limited Edition CD+DVD
No.	Title	Length
1.	"behind-the-scenes footage"

== Music videos ==
- "Distance～君とのキョリ"

== Release history ==
Country	Date	Distributing label	Format
Japan	September 19, 2007	Pony Canyon	CD
Japan	September 19, 2007	Pony Canyon	Limited Edition CD
Japan	September 19, 2007	Pony Canyon	Limited Edition CD+DVD
