= Lucky Days (song) =

2008 single by SS501

Single by SS501
- A-side: "Lucky Days"
- B-side: "Summer Blue"/"Hoshizora"
- Released: June 18, 2008
- Genre: J-pop, R&B, dance
- Label: DSP Media, Pony Canyon

SS501 singles chronology
"Distance" (2007)	"Lucky Days" (2008)	"Holding Your Hand" (2008)

"Lucky Days" is South Korean boy band SS501's third Japanese maxi single. It was released on June 18, 2008, by Pony Canyon.

The album consists of three songs, "Lucky Days", "Summer Blue", and "Hoshizora" and an instrumental version of each track.

== Track listing ==
No.	Title	Length
1.	"Lucky Days"
2.	"Summer Blue"
3.	"Hoshizora"
4.	"Lucky Days" (Inst.)
5.	"Summer Blue" (Inst.)
6.	"Hoshizora" (Inst.)

NOTE: For the limited editions, "Hoshizora" track is not available.

Limited Edition CD+DVD
No.	Title	Length
1.	"cover shoot and behind-the-scenes footage"

Limited Edition CD
No.	Title	Length
1.	"Kimi wo Utau Uta"
2.	"Kimi wo Utau Uta" (Inst.)

== Music videos ==
- "Lucky Days"

== Release history ==
Country	Date	Distributing label	Format
Japan	June 18, 2008	Pony Canyon	CD
Japan	June 18, 2008	Pony Canyon	Limited Edition CD+DVD
Japan	June 18, 2008	Pony Canyon	Limited Edition CD
