= S.T 01 Now =

S.T. 01 NOW
- S.T. 01 NOW album cover

Studio album by SS501
- Released: November 10, 2006
- Genre: K-pop, R&B, dance
- Length: 52:15
- Language: Korean
- Label: DSP Entertainment

SS501 chronology
Snow Prince (2005)	S.T. 01 NOW (2006)	SS501 (2007)

Music video
- "Unlock" on YouTube "4Chance" on YouTube

S.T. 01 NOW is the first full-length studio album by South Korean boy band SS501, released on November 10, 2006 by DSP Media.

The album title was named after the combination of "S" from SS501, "T" from Triple S (SS501's official fanclub), and "01 NOW" which, when combined altogether, means "SS501 and Triple S united as one from now until forever".

The first single from the album was "Unlock", followed by "Four Chance", and then "Coward".

== Track listing ==
No.	Title	Lyrics	Music	Length
1.	"Existence"	Lee Byung-jun	Lee Byung-jun	03:33
2.	"4Chance"	Han Sang-won, Kwon Ho-joong	Han Sang-won	03:37
3.	"Unlock"	Cha Sang-min	Kim Tae-hyun	03:56
4.	"Again"	Shin-U	Hwang Seong-je (BJJ)	03:45
5.	"Stand By Me"	Jung Mi-ra	Jung Dong-joong	03:26
6.	"Sky"	BigBang	BigBang	03:54
7.	"겁쟁이" (Coward)	Shin-U	Hwang Seong-je (BJJ)	03:33
8.	"Man"	Kim Tae-yoon	Kim Do-hyun	03:54
9.	"Hana"	Kim I-na	Park Geun-cheol	04:07
10.	"Confession (서툰고백)"	Kim Se-jin, Seo Jung-jin	Kim Se-jin, Seo Jung-jin	03:50
11.	"Bye Bye"	Lee Seung-min	Hwang Seong-je (BJJ)	03:33
12.	"Radio Star"	Lee Yoon-kyung	Lee Byung-jun	03:08
13.	"세상의 날개" (Wings Of The World)	Lee Byung-jun	Lee Byung-jun	04:14
14.	"경고" (Warning) (Remix Ver.)	Kim Do-hyun	Kim Do-hyun	03:10
15.	"Unlock" (Heavy Edition)	Cha Sang-min	Kim Tae-hyun	03:55
Total length:				52:15

Taiwan version Limited Edition CD+DVD
No.	Title	Length
1.	"4 Chance" (music video)
2.	"Unlock" (music video)
3.	"Coward" (music video)
4.	"Warning" (music video)
5.	"Never Again" (music video)
6.	"Everything" (music video)
7.	"Fighter" (music video)
8.	"Snow Prince" (music video)

== Music videos ==
- "Unlock"
- "Four Chance"
- "Coward"

== Release history ==
Country	Date	Distributing label	Format
South Korea	November 10, 2006	DSP Media	CD
Japan	May 2008	Pony Canyon	CD
Taiwan	January 2010	Warner Music Taiwan	Limited Edition CD+DVD
