= Park Jung-min discography =

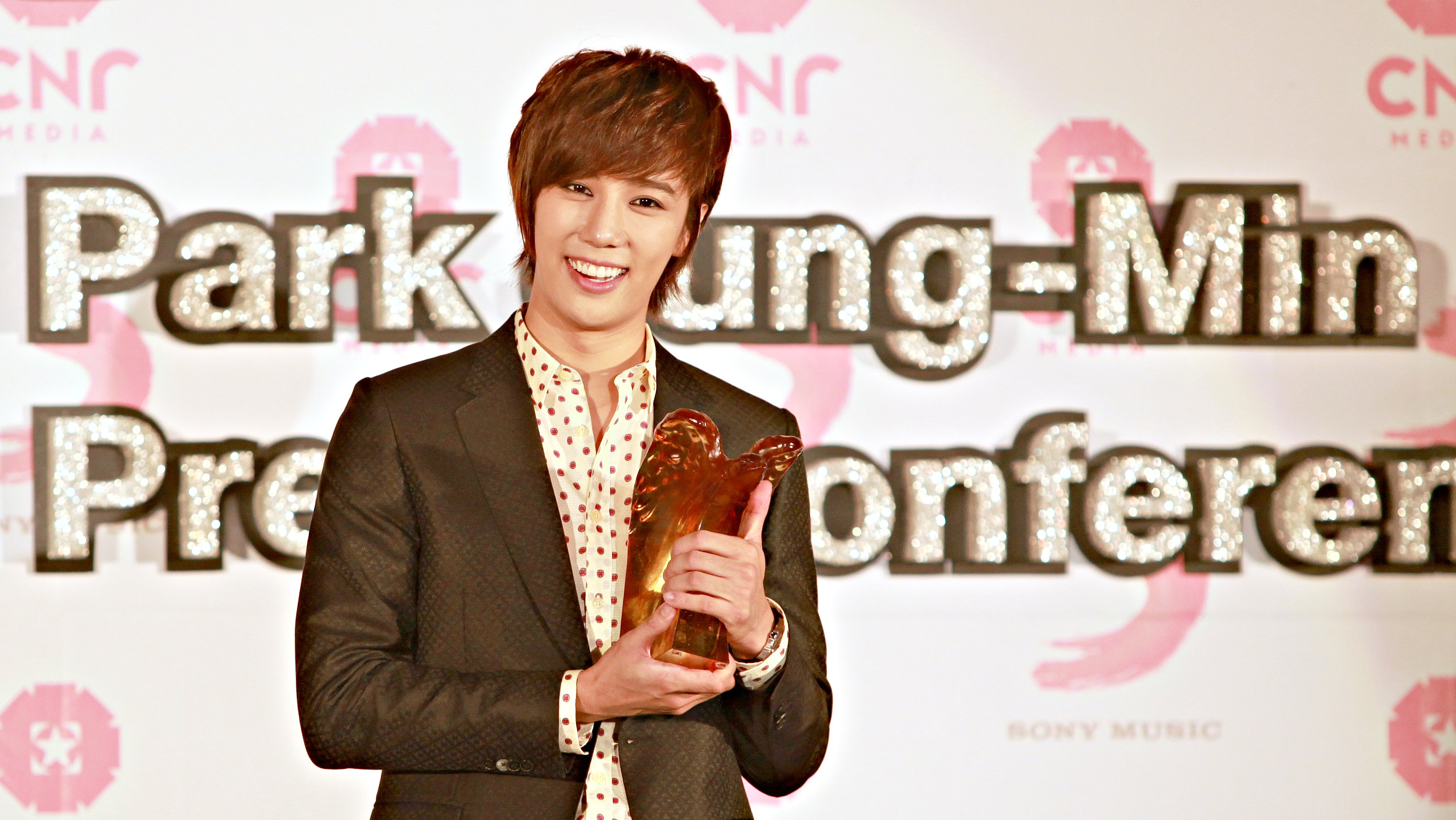
- Studio albums: 2
- EPs: 1
- Soundtrack albums: 4
- Singles: 20
- Video albums: 3
- Music videos: 10
- Promotional singles: -

South Korean singer and the low-pitch (baritone) vocalist of SS501, Park Jung-min has released two studio albums (one is an album dedicated to his 10th debut anniversary), two EPs, 20 singles, 4 soundtrack contribution songs, 3 DVDs, and 7 music compositions.

During 2005-2010, JungMin has had two solo songs from SS501 albums: "Here" from Kokoro, and "If You Cannot" with Ji-sun from SS501 Solo Collection. He also sang "Only Me" in 2009, but was not released until 2010 in Superstar OST.

JungMin released his debut solo single, Not Alone. He, then released his first mini-album The, Park Jung Min in April, and Wara Wara The, Park Jung Min for Japanese limited edition in May.

In 2012, JungMin contributed to Fondant Garden Taiwanese drama OST, in which he was the main lead, entitled "Bad Person". Later on, Park JungMin debuted in Japan using the name 'ROMEO' under Victor Music. He released two albums, named Give Me Your Heart and Tonight's The Night in September and October respectively. Afterwards, he returned to Korea to continue his music career as 'Park JungMin' and released his first self-produced single album entitled Beautiful. At the end of the year, he released a full length Japanese album Midnight Theatre back as ROMEO.

In 2014, he released Save Us Tonight in Japan under his real name, Park JungMin. In the same year, JungMin further released 'Summer Break', 'Softly', 'Winter Love' and also 'Christmas Kiss' singles.

In 2015, JungMin released 'It's Summer Time....' and 'Last Breath'. Before started his 2 years military service, JungMin has pre-recorded the following (and released later in 2015/2016): 'Run Away', 'In The Forest' and 'Faith'.

In 2016, JungMin released a limited edition single 'Happiness' on his birthday. Recently, in January 2017, JungMin/ROMEO released 'Toxic Love' (all are pre-recorded before JungMin started his military service).

== Studio albums ==
Year	Title	Album details	Peak positions		Sales and Certifications
Year	Title	Album details	KOR	JPN	Sales and Certifications
Japanese
2012	Midnight Theatre	Release Date: December 19, 2012; Label: Colourful Records/Victor Entertainment; Info: released under the name of ROMEO	—	66	
2015	10th Anniversary Memories	Release Date: May 1, 2015; Label: Park JungMin Inc; Info: Celebrating Park JungMin's 10th debut Anniversary	—	—	
"—" denotes releases that did not chart or were not released in that region.

== Extended plays ==
Year	Title	Details	Peak positions		Sales and Certifications
Year	Title	Details	KOR	JPN	Sales and Certifications
Korean
2011	The, Park Jung Min	Release Date: April 1, 2011; Label: CNr Media	4	34	KOR: 9,987
"—" denotes releases that did not chart or were not released in that region.

== Singles ==
Year	Title	Peak positions		Sales and Certifications	Album
Year	Title	KOR	JPN	Sales and Certifications	Album
Korean
2009	"하면은 안돼" (If You Can Not)	—	—		Solo Collection
2011	"Not Alone"	41	—	KOR: 17,450 (CD)	The, Park Jung Min
2011	"눈물이 흐를 만큼" (Like Tears are Falling)	—	—		The, Park Jung Min
2011	"Wara, Wara"	—	—		Wara Wara The, Park Jung Min
2012	"Beautiful"	—	—	KOR: 9,623 (CD)	Non-album single
Japanese
2007	"Here"	—	—		Kokoro Ltd. Ed. A (Park Jung Min Ver.)
2012	"Give Me Your Heart"	—	26		Midnight Theatre
2012	"Tonight's The Night"	—	20		Midnight Theatre
2014	"Save Us Tonight"	—	—		Non-album single
2014	"Summer Break!"	—	—		Non-album single
2014	"ALIVE"	—	—		Non-album single
2014	"Winter Love"	—	—		Non-album single
2014	"Christmas Kiss"	—	—		Christmas Special - Limited edition
2015	"It's Summer Time ..."	—	—		Non-album single
2015	"Last Breath"	—	—		LAST NOTE (ROMEO's diary)
2015	"Run Away"	—	—		Non-album single
2015	"In The Forest"	—	—		Non-album single
2015	"FAITH"	—	—		Non-album single
2016	"Happiness"	—	—		Non-album single
2017	"TOXIC LOVE"	—	—		Non-album single
"—" denotes releases that did not chart or were not released in that region.

== Soundtrack contributions ==
Year	Title	Peak positions		Album
Year	Title	KOR	JPN	Album
2010	"나 뿐인가요" (Only Me?)	—	—	Superstar OST
2011	"君色" (Your Color)	—	112	Love Song In August OST
2011	"그립다" (Missing You)	97	—	The Princess' Man OST
2012	"壞人" (Bad Person)	—	—	Fondant Garden OST
"—" denotes releases that did not chart or were not released in that region.

=== Video albums ===
Year	Title	Details	Tracklisting	Ref.
2010	Park Jung Min 1st Photo Album -Present	Release date: December 27, 2010		
2011	Park Jung Min - Love Song in August DVD八月のラヴソング	Release date: December 19, 2011; Lismo drama aired: August 5, 2011		
2013	Park Jung Min X'mas Fan Meeting 2012 DVD	Limited edition sold only during ZEPP tour in 2013; Event: third annual fan Meeting in Japan; Date: December 19, 2012; Venue: Tokyo Dome City Hall		
2014	パクジョンミン X'mas LIVE in Tokyo	Release date: August 2014		
2014	Park Jung Min Valentine's Concert 2014.02.14	Release date: Fall 2014		

== Videography ==
=== Music videos ===
Year	Song
2011	"Not Alone"
2011	"Like Tears are Falling"
2012	"Give Me Your Heart"
2012	"Tonight's The Night"
2012	"Beautiful"
2014	"Save Us Tonight"
2014	"Summer Break"
2014	"Softly"
2014	"Winter Love"
2015	"ALIVE"

== Others ==
=== Production credits ===
Year	Song	Artist	Role	Album
2009	"Kiss"	Rainbow	lyricist	Gossip Girl
2009	"Green Peas"	SS501	co-lyricist with SS501	Rebirth
2011	"Not Alone"	himself	lyricist	"Not Alone"
2011	"Do You Know?"	himself	lyricist	"Not Alone"
2011	"Everyday Is Christmas"	himself	lyricist	"Not Alone"
2011	"Your Colour"	himself	lyricist	Love Song In August OST
2012	"Beautiful"	himself	lyricist	"Beautiful"

=== Concerts/Major Fan meetings ===
The following is an incomplete list of Park Jung-min's concerts, major fanmeetings, and tours.

Year	Concert title	Details	Ref.
2011	Park Jung Min Not Alone Fan Meet Party	Venue: Dragonfly, St. James Power Station; Date: March 20, 2011	
2012	Face Off Concert	Venue: Tokyo Dome City Hall; Date: December 18, 2012	
2012	Christmas Fanmeeting 2012 - Beautiful	Event: third annual fan Meeting in Japan; Date: December 19, 2012; Venue: Tokyo Dome City Hall	
2013	ZEPP TOUR	Venue: ZEPP Halls in different cities of Japan; Date: March 19 to 23, 2013	
2013	First South and Latin America fanmeeting	Cities: Lima, Mexico City, Arequipa; Date: August 17, 20, 24	
2014	Park Jung Min Reverso Tour	Countries: Paris, Germany, and Russia; Date: January 29 - February 3, 2014	

== See also ==
- SS501 discography
- Kim Hyun-joong discography
- Heo Young-saeng discography
- Kim Kyu-jong discography
- Kim Hyung-jun discography
