= Beautiful (Park Jung-min song) =

Single by Park Jung-min
- Released: November 14, 2012
- Genre: K-pop
- Label: Yamaha A&R; CJ E&M
- Songwriter(s): Park Jung-min, Denniz Jamm, Derrick Palmer, Alexander Holmgren

Park Jung-min singles chronology
"Not Alone" (2011)	"Beautiful" (2012)

Music video
- "Beautiful" on YouTube

Beautiful is Park Jung-min's second Korean single. Besides its title track "Beautiful" and an acoustic and instrumental version of it, the CD also includes "You Know", featuring Zuwan of hip-hop group Viva Soul.

The single album is Park Jung-min's first Korean release since his mini-album THE, PARK JUNG MIN in April 2011. It marks the first release under his new agency Yamaha A&R, who Park signed with after his lawsuit against his old agency, CNr Media, had come to an end.

Park had his comeback performance at Mnet's M! Countdown on November 15, followed by MBC's Music Core two days later, performing the single album's title track "Beautiful".

The album reached 4th place on Hanteo's Weekly K-Pop Chart from November 12 to 18, 2012.

== Track listing ==
No.	Title	Lyrics	Music	Arrangement	Length
1.	"Beautiful"	Park Jung-min	Denniz Jamm, Derrick Palmer, Alexander Holmgren	Denniz Jamm	03:37
2.	"있잖아요 (You Know) with Zuwan"	Zuwan	Zuwan	Zuwan	03:09
3.	"Beautiful" (Acoustic Ver.)	Park Jung-min	Denniz Jamm, Derrick Palmer	Zuwan	04:02
4.	"Beautiful" (Instrumental Ver.)		Denniz Jamm, Derrick Palmer, Alexander Holmgren	Denniz Jamm	03:34

== Music videos ==
- "Beautiful"

== Charts ==
Chart		Country	Period	Peak
Name	Category	Country	Period	Peak
Gaon	Weekly Album	South Korea	11–17 November 2012	#3
Gaon	Monthly Album	South Korea	November 2012	#8
Hanteo	Weekly K-Pop	South Korea	12–18 November 2012	#4
