= Tonight's the Night (Romeo song) =

- Tonight's the Night (Normal edition) cover

Single by ROMEO

from the album Midnight Theatre
- Released: October 31, 2012
- Genre: J-pop
- Label: Victor Entertainment; Colourful Records
- Songwriters: Tarantula, her0ism, Samuel Waermo, Jeff Miyahara

ROMEO singles chronology
"Give Me Your Heart" (2012)	"Tonight's the Night" (2012)	"Save Us Tonight" (2014)

Tonight's the Night is ROMEO's second Japanese single. There are five different versions available, whose covers includes one of the five letters of the artist's name each.

== Track listing ==
Track	Limited editions				Normal edition
Track	Jacket A	Jacket B	Jacket C	Jacket D	Normal edition
1.	"Tonight's The Night"				
2.	"I. The Dawn -沈黙- (Romeo sound story)"	"II. The Moon -蒼い月- (Romeo sound story)"	"III. The Touch -輪郭- (Romeo sound story)"	"IV. The Thirst -渇望- (Romeo sound story)"	"V. The Fate -彷徨- (Romeo sound story)"
3.	"君を、守りたい" (I Want To Protect You)	"Lover's Spirit"	"Hide And Seek Love"	"Sin"	"Dream Out Loud"
4.	"Tonight's The Night" [Inst.]				

== Credits ==
Song	Lyrics	Composition	Length
"Tonight's The Night"	Tarantula	her0ism, Samuel Waermo, Jeff Miyahara	03:32
"君を、守りたい" (I Want To Protect You)	Kenn Kato	Jeff Miyahara	03:34
"Lover's Spirit"	Satomi	Jeff Miyahara, Erik Lidbom	03:06
"Hide And Seek Love"	Junji Ishiwatari	Erik Lidbom, Jeff Miyahara	03:24
"Sin"	miyakei	Enik Lin, Jeff Miyahara	04:05
"Dream Out Loud"	Kanata Okajima	Andy Love, Neil Athale	04:04
Romeo sound stories	Kanata Okajima	Jeff Miyahara	~01:10

== Charts ==
Chart	Country	Period	Peak
Oricon Weekly Single Chart	Japan	Week of Oct. 29 - Nov. 4	#20
