= Give Me Your Heart (Romeo song) =

Single by ROMEO

from the album Midnight Theatre
- Released: September 5, 2012
- Genre: J-pop; Pop rock
- Label: Victor Entertainment; Colourful Records
- Songwriters: lyrics = Kanata Okajima, music = Jeff Miyahara, Erik Lidbom

ROMEO singles chronology
"Give Me Your Heart" (2012)	"Tonight's the Night" (2012)

Music video
- "Give Me Your Heart" Video on YouTube

Give Me Your Heart is ROMEO's debut Japanese single. It is Park Jung-min's first release as ROMEO. There is one normal edition and two limited editions, one of which includes a bonus DVD.

== Track listing ==
=== Normal edition ===
No.	Title	Lyrics	Music	Length
1.	"Give Me Your Heart"	Kanata Okajima	Jeff Miyahara, Erik Lidbom	04:20
2.	"Taste the Fever"	Tarantula	Allan Eshuijs, Nis Bφgvad	03:17
3.	"Give Me Your Heart" (Instrumental Ver.)		Jeff Miyahara, Erik Lidbom	04:19

=== Limited editions ===
No.	Title	Lyrics	Music	Length
1.	"Give Me Your Heart"	Kanata Okajima	Jeff Miyahara, Erik Lidbom	04:20
2.	"Devil"	Kanata Okajima	Jeff Miyahara, Erik Lidbom	03:48
3.	"Give Me Your Heart" (Instrumental Ver.)		Jeff Miyahara, Erik Lidbom	04:19

Limited edition A: Bonus DVD
No.	Title	Length
1.	"Give Me Your Heart (Music video)"	04:08
2.	"ROMEO Trailer"

== Music videos ==
- "Give Me Your Heart"

== Release history ==
Country	Date	Distributing label	Format
Japan	September 5, 2012	Victor Entertainment; Colourful Records	CD (Normal Edition)
Japan	September 5, 2012	Victor Entertainment; Colourful Records	CD+DVD (Limited Edition A)
Japan	September 5, 2012	Victor Entertainment; Colourful Records	CD (Limited Edition B)

== Charts ==
Chart	Country	Period	Peak
Oricon Weekly Single Chart	Japan	Week of Sep. 3 - 9	#26
