= SS501 discography =

South Korean boy band discography

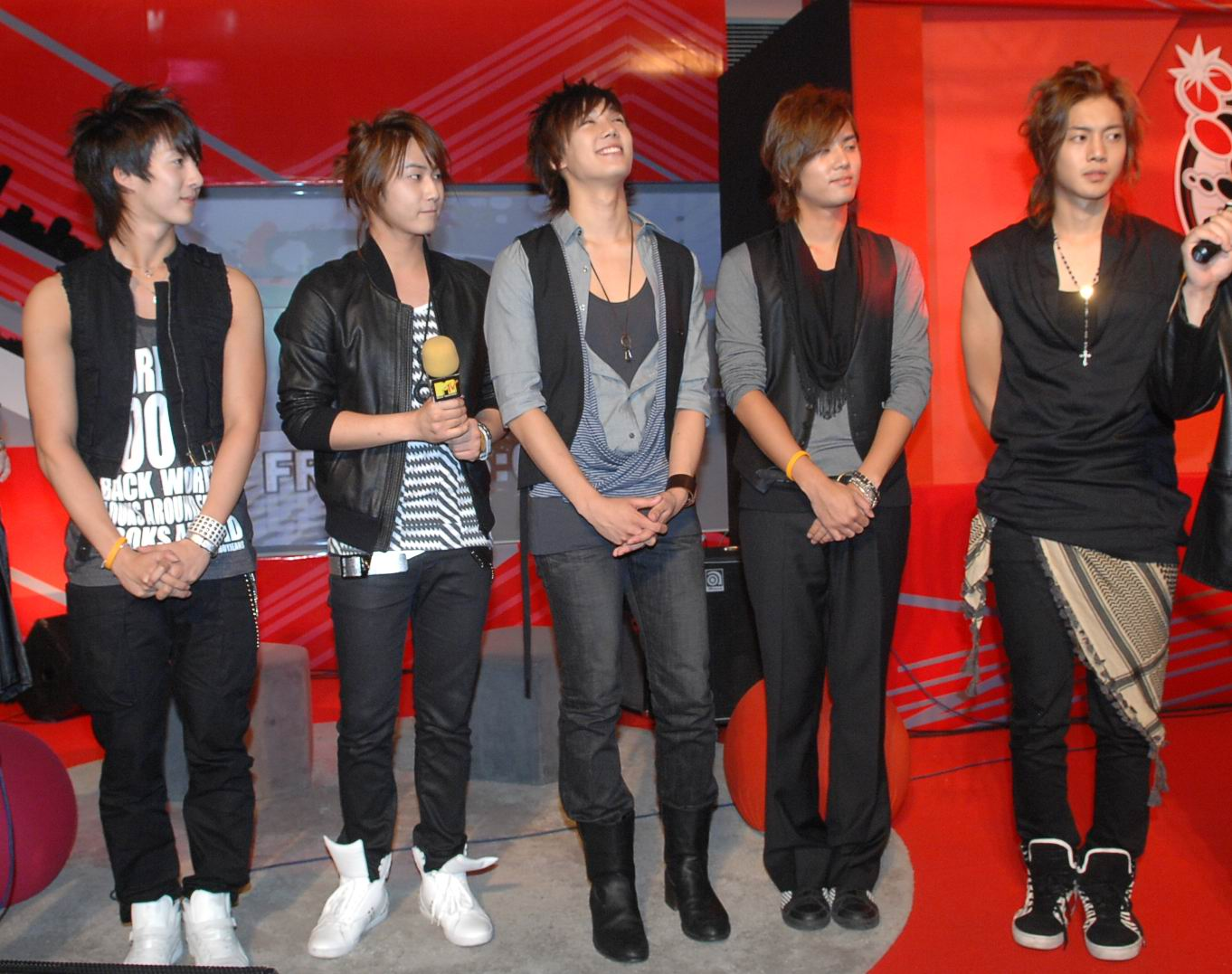
- SS501 at My Style My MTV in 2008 (f.l.t.r.) Kim Hyung-jun, Heo Young-saeng, Park Jung-min, Kim Kyu-jong and leader Kim Hyun-joong
- Studio albums: 4
- Extended plays: 10
- Soundtrack albums: 10
- Compilation albums: 4
- Video albums: 20
- Music videos: 21

This is the discography of South Korean boy band SS501 that was formed under the management of DSP Media, formerly known as Daesung Entertainment and DSP Entertainment. The group debuted on 8 June 2005 with five members: Kim Hyun-joong, Heo Young-saeng, Kim Kyu-jong, Park Jung-min and Kim Hyung-jun.

Although all the members moved to different agencies, after their contracts with DSP Media had expired in June 2010, the group has, according to its leader Kim Hyun-joong, not disbanded. The members are, however, currently pursuing solo careers.

== Albums ==
=== Studio albums ===
Title	Details	Peak chart positions	
Title	Details	KOR (Note: The Gaon Music Chart was established in 2010.)	JPN
S.T 01 Now	Released: November 10, 2006 (KOR); Label: DSP Entertainment; Formats: CD, digital download	45	—
SS501	Released: October 24, 2007 (JPN); Label: Pony Canyon; Formats: CD, digital download	—	20
All My Love	Released: May 13, 2009 (JPN); Label: Pony Canyon; Formats: CD, digital download	—	10
Set it Off	Released: March 7, 2026 (KOR); Label: Henecia, Kakao Entertainment; Formats: CD, digital download	—	—
"—" denotes releases that did not chart or were not released in that region.

=== Compilation albums ===
Title	Details	Peak chart positions	
Title	Details	JPN	TWN
Singles	Released: May 21, 2008 (JPN); Label: Pony Canyon; Format: CD; Track listing: 1. Warning (警告); 2. Passion; 3. Never Again; 4. Take U High; 5. Everything; 6. White Person (白い人); 7. My Girl; 8. Snow Prince; 9. In Your Smile; 10. Fighter	299	—
1st Solo Album	Released: July 2, 2009 (TWN); Label: Warner Music Taiwan; Formats: CD+DVD; Track listing: CD; 1. Thank You (고맙다) - Kim Hyun-joong solo, from Find; 2. Is It Love? (사랑인거죠) - Heo Young-saeng solo, from U R Man; 3. Never Let You Go - Kim Kyu-jong solo, from U R Man; 4. Only Me? (나 뿐인가요) - Park Jung-min solo, new song 5. I Am - Kim Hyung-jun solo, from U R Man; 6. Thank You (고맙다) acoustic ver. - Kim Hyun-joong solo, from Find; DVD: 1. Individual greetings and self-introduction 2. NGs and filming 3. Recording	—	4
Super Hits!	Released: July 3, 2009 (TWN); Label: Warner Music Taiwan; Formats: CD+DVD	—	2
Best Collection Volume 1	Released: September 3, 2014 (JPN); Label: Pony Canyon; Formats: CD+DVD; Track listing Keikoku (警告): 1. Passion; 2. Never Again; 3. Everything; 4. Shiroi hito (白い人); 5. Snow Prince; 6. Fighter; 7. Unlock; 8. Again; 9. 4 Chance; 10. Yowamushi (弱虫); 11. Bye Bye; 12. DEJA VU; 13. Kimi o utau uta (君を歌う歌); 14. FIND; 15. Arigatou (ありがとう) - Kim Hyun Joong; 16. Kimi wa boku no tengoku (キミは僕の天国); 17. U R Man; 18. Douka yoku shite kure (どうかよくしてくれ) - Kim Hyun Joong; 19. Namae no nai kioku (名前のない記憶) - Heo Young Saeng; 20. Wuss Up - Kim Kyu Jong; 21. Shite wa dame (してはだめ) - Park Jung Min; 22. HEY G - Kim Hyung Joon; 23. LOVE LIKE THIS; 24. LOVE YA; 25. Let Me Be The One	23	—
Best Collection Volume 2	Released: September 3, 2014 (JPN); Label: Pony Canyon; Formats: CD+DVD; Track listing: 1. Kokoro; 2. BE A STAR; 3. RIZE UP; 4. Hajimete miru sora datta (はじめて見る空だった); 5. Hikari (光); 6. HERE; 7. Sayonara ga dekinai (さよならができない); 8. Distance~ Kimi to no kyori (Distance～君とのキョリ ) 9. Gleaming Star; 10. LIVE!; 11. Always and Forever; 12. LUCKY DAYS; 13. Summer Blue; 14. Hoshizora (ホシゾラ); 15. Mermaid...; 16. Asai yume no hate (浅い夢の果て); 17. All My Love	24	—
"—" denotes releases that did not chart or were not released in that region.

== Extended plays ==
Title	Details	Peak chart positions			Sales
Title	Details	KOR (Note: The Gaon Music Chart was established in 2010.)	JPN	TWN	Sales
Warning	Released: June 22, 2005 (KOR); Label: DSP Entertainment; Formats: CD, digital download	—	—	—	KOR: 28,586
Snow Prince	Released: December 5, 2005 (KOR); Label: DSP Entertainment; Formats: CD, digital download	—	—	—	
Deja Vu	Released: March 13, 2008 (KOR); Label: DSP Media; Formats: CD, digital download	22	133	— (Note: The Weekly Top 20 Combo Chart for the week starting September 25, 2009 is not archived online, but Deja Vu peaked at #3 on the component Weekly Top 20 J-Pop Chart.)	
Find	Released: July 24, 2008 (KOR); Label: DSP Media; Formats: CD, digital download	80	240	— (Note: The Weekly Top 20 Combo Chart for the week starting September 25, 2009 is not archived online, but Find peaked at #2 on the component Weekly Top 20 J-Pop Chart.)	KOR: 20,387
U R Man	Released: November 21, 2008 (KOR); Label: DSP Media; Formats: CD, digital download	3	—	— (Note: U R Man did not chart on the Weekly Top 20 Combo Chart, but it peaked at #2 on the component Weekly Top 20 J-Pop Chart.)	
Solo Collection	Released: July 21, 2009 (KOR); Label: DSP Media; Formats: CD, digital download	20	—	3	
Rebirth	Released: October 20, 2009 (KOR); Label: DSP Media; Formats: CD, digital download	1	—	— (Note: The Weekly Top 20 Combo Chart for the week starting November 20, 2009 is not archived online, but Rebirth peaked at #1 on the component Weekly Top 20 J-Pop Chart.)	KOR: 3,327
Destination	Released: May 24, 2010 (KOR); Label: DSP Media; Formats: CD, digital download	1	38	20	KOR: 69,304
"—" denotes releases that did not chart or were not released in that region.

== Singles ==
Title	Year	Peak chart positions		Album
Title	Year	KOR (Note: The Gaon Music Chart was established in 2010.)	JPN	Album
Korean
"Warning" (경고)	2005	—	—	Warning
"Snow Prince"	2005	—	—	Snow Prince
"Unlock"	2006	—	—	S.T 01 Now
"Deja Vu" (데자뷰)	2008	—	—	Deja Vu
"You Are My Heaven" (넌 나의 천국)	2008	—	—	Find
"Find"	2008	—	—	Find
"U R Man" (널 부르는 노래)	2008	—	—	U R Man
"Love Like This" (네게로)	2009	—	—	Rebirth
"Love Ya"	2010	12	—	Destination
"Last Christmas"	2025	—	—	Set it Off
Japanese
"Kokoro"	2007	—	10	Kokoro (maxi single)
"Distance"	2007	—	9	Distance (maxi single)
"Lucky Days"	2008	—	4	Lucky Days (maxi single)
"—" denotes releases that did not chart or were not released in that region.

== Soundtrack appearances ==
Title	Year	Album
"Fly Away"	2007	Dive Into The Koongya's World OST
"Love That Can't Be Erased" (지울수없는 사랑)	2007	Surgeon Bong Dal-hee OST
"Memories of Childhood" (어린날의 기억)	2007	Surgeon Bong Dal-hee OST
"If We're Together" (우리 함께라면)	2008	Strongest Chil Woo OST
"Gaze" (바라보며)	2008	Heartbreak Library OST
"Because I'm Stupid" (내 머리가 나빠서)	2009	Boys Over Flowers OST
"Making a Lover" (애인만들기)	2009	Boys Over Flowers OST Part 2
"Sometime"	2009	Boys Over Flowers OST F4 Special Edition

== Videography ==
=== DVDs ===
Title	Details	Peak chart positions
Title	Details	JPN
1st Concert Step Up	Released: December 4, 2006 (KOR); Publisher: CJ Music; Format: 3 DVD; Track listing Disc 1: Main Concert: 1. "Fighter"; 2. "Passion"; 3. Ment I 4. "Everything"; 5. "Never Again"; 6. Video I: News; 7. Video II: Dance; 8. "경고" (Warning); 9. Video III: Making sketch 10. "Bye Bye"; 11. "Radio Star"; 12. "Take U High"; 13. "In Your Smile"; 14. Video IV: Step Up; 15. "여름안에서" (In The Summer) - Deux cover 16. "으쌰으쌰" (Eusha! Eusha!) - Shinhwa cover 17. "폼생폼사" (Living In Style) - Sechs Kies cover 18. Ment II; 19. "Snow Prince"; 20. "하얀사람" (White Person); 21. "My Girl"; 22. Video V: Epilogue; Disc 2: Special Feature 1: 1. Concert Making Of; 2. Member's Story; 3. NG Cut; 4. Photo Gallery; Disc 3: Special Feature 2: 1. SS501 Mnet Collection - M!Pick 200 'US Colonization'	—
1st Concert in Osaka	Released: March 28, 2007 (JPN); Publisher: Pony Canyon; Format: 2 DVD; Track listing Disc 1: Concert: 1. "Fighter"; 2. "Passion"; 3. "In Your Smile"; 4. "Never Again"; 5. "No Matter What" - Boyzone cover 6. "Radio Star"; 7. "Sky"; 8. "Bye Bye"; 9. "Take U High"; 10. "My Girl"; 11. "Everything"; 12. "白い人" (White Person); 13. "警告" (Warning); 14. "Snow Prince"; Disc 2: Special Feature: 1. Making Film; 2. Photo Gallery; 3. 1st Concert in Seoul Digest	104
The 1st Story Of SS501	Released: April 19, 2007 (KOR), February 20, 2008 (JPN); Publisher: DSP Entertainment, Pony Canyon; Format: 3 DVD; Track listing Disc 1: SBS Broadcasts Pt.1: SBS Music Space Special; 1. "Never Again" & "Snow Prince"; 2. "4Chance"; 3. Special Talk #1; 4. "겁쟁이" (Coward) - Heo Young-saeng solo 5. "I Do" - Kim Kyu-jong solo 6. "Summer Night" - Park Jung-min solo 7. "끝이 아니길" (Wish It's Not The End) - Vibe cover - Kim Hyun-joong solo 8. "Condition Of My Heart" - Kim Hyung-jun & Heo Young-saeng; 9. Special Talk #2; 10. "Unlock"; 11. "Again"; SBS Popular Song Clip; 1. "경고" (Warning); 2. "Never Again"; 3. "Everything"; 4. "Snow Prince"; 5. "Fighter"; 6. "Unlock"; 7. "4Chance"; 8. "겁쟁이" (Coward); 9. 2005 SBS Gayo Daejun Rookie of the Year Award ("Snow Prince"); 10. 2006 SBS Gayo Daejun Netizen's Choice Award ("4Chance"); Music Video Clips; 1. "경고" (Warning); 2. "Never Again"; 3. "Everything"; 4. "Snow Prince"; 5. "Fighter"; 6. "Unlock"; 7. "4Chance"; 8. "겁쟁이" (Coward); 9. Special Version of "겁쟁이" (Coward); Karaoke; Disc 2: Concert: Play The Concert 2006-12-27; 1. "Snow Prince"; 2. "하얀사람" (White Person); 3. Opening Ment; 4. "4Chance"; 5. "Again"; 6. "Bye Bye"; 7. "Stand By Me"; 8. "Hana"; 9. "Never Again"; 10. "Sky"; 11. "Passion"; 12. "경고" (Warning); 13. "Fighter"; 14. Closing Ment; 15. "Unlock"; 16. "세상의 날개" (Wings Of The World); Multiangles; 1. "내 남자친구에게" (To My Boyfriend) - Fin.K.L cover; Deleted Scenes; 1. 보이즈 포맨 (Boyz 4 Men); 2. 눈가리고 야옹; 3. "내 남자친구에게" (To My Boyfriend); Making Film; Disc 3: SBS Broadcasts Pt.2: SBS show Fan Cam; 1. Heo Young-saeng; 2. Park Jung-min; 3. Kim Kyu-jong; 4. Kim Hyun-joong; 5. Kim Hyung-jun; SBS Broadcasting Clips; 1. 뮤직웨이브 스페셜 (Music Wave Special) #1; 2. 뮤직웨이브 스페셜 (Music Wave Special) #2; 3. 일요일이 좋다 X맨 스페셜 (Good Sunday X-Man Special); No Cut Music Video; 1. Scene #1; 2. Scene #2; 3. Scene #3; 4. Scene #4; 5. Scene #5; 6. Scene #6; 7. Scene #7; 8. Scene #8; Music Video Making Film	175
Live In Japan 2007	Released: August 29, 2007 (JPN); Publisher: Pony Canyon; Format: 3 DVD; Track listing Disc 1: Concert: 1. "Snow Prince"; 2. "弱虫" (Coward); 3. "4Chance"; 4. "Never Again"; 5. "Passion"; 6. "Again"; 7. "Hana"; 8. "Man"; 9. "Find The Way"; 10. "Story"; 11. "白い人" (White Person); 12. "Bye Bye"; 13. "警告" (Warning); 14. "Fighter"; 15. "Unlock"; 16. "世界の翼" (Wings Of The World); Disc 2: Special Feature: 1. Interviews; 1. Young-saeng; 2. Hyung-jun; 3. Hyun-joong; 4. Jung-min; 5. Kyu-jong; 2. Making Film; 3. Photo Gallery; Disc 3: Mnet Special Broadcast: 1. Star Watch 24 Vol.1; 2. Star Watch 24 Vol.2	60
Special Event Tour Heart To Heart	Released: February 2, 2008 (JPN); Publisher: Pony Canyon; Format: 2 DVD; Track listing Disc 1: Concert 2007-09-19: 1. "Kokoro"; 2. Talk; 3. "Distance ~ 君とのキョリ" (Kimi To No Kyori); 4. "Be A Star"; 5. "上を向いて歩こう"; 6. "Gleaming Star"; 7. "Alice"; 8. "Distance ~ 君とのキョリ" (Kimi To No Kyori); 9. "Be A Star"; 10. "Alice"; Disc 2: Special Videos: 1. "はじめて見る空だった" (Hajimete Miru Sora Datta) - Heo Young-saeng solo, 2007-09-05 in Sapporo; 2. "光" (Hikari) - Kim Kyu-jong solo, 2007-09-10 in Nagoya; 3. "Rize Up" - Kim Hyun-joong solo, 2007-09-12 in Nagoya; 4. "光" (Hikari) & "はじめて見る空だった" (Hajimete Miru Sora Datta) - Kim Kyu-jong and Heo Young-saeng, 2007-09-14 in Fukuoka; 5. "Here" - Park Jung-min solo, 2007-09-18 in Tokyo; 6. "さよならができない" (Sayonara Ga Dekinai) - Kim Hyung-jun solo, 2007.09.19 in Tokyo; 7. Tour Documentary Part 1; 8. Tour Documentary Part 2; 9. SS501 at Recording Studio	71
Deja Vu	Released: May 21, 2008 (JPN); Publisher: Pony Canyon; Format: DVD+CD	133
Clips Vol.1	Released: July 16, 2008 (JPN); Publisher: Pony Canyon; Format: DVD; Track listing: 1. "Kokoro"; 2. "Distance ~ 君とのキョリ" (Kimi To No Kyori); 3. "Distance ~ 君とのキョリ" (Kimi To No Kyori) [Dance Ver.]; 4. "Lucky Days"	94
2008 Japan Tour Grateful Days Thanks For...	Released: September 17, 2008 (JPN); Publisher: Pony Canyon; Format: DVD; Track listing: Concert; 1. "Live!"; 2. "Distance ~ 君とのキョリ" (Kimi To No Kyori); 3. "Be A Star"; 4. "Butterfly"; 5. "サンセット" (Sunset); 6. "ホシゾラ" (Hoshizora); 7. "Gleaming Star"; 8. "Again"; 9. "ホンとに好きだった" (Honto Ni Sukidatta); 10. "君を歌う歌" (Kimi Wo Utau Uta) (A Song Calling For You) [Korean Remix Ver.]; 11. "弱虫~臆病な僕" (Yowamushi ~ Okubyou Na Boku) - Japanese Ver. of "겁쟁이" (Coward); 12. "No Exit Days"; 13. "Kokoro"; 14. "Summer Blue"; 15. "Lucky Days"; 16. "Always and Forever"; 17. "Deja Vu"; Making Of; Backstage Footage; Interviews	35
Photo 501	Released: November 21, 2008 (KOR); Publisher: Taewon Entertainment; Format: Photobook + DVD; Track listing Photobook: 1. Credits; 2. Hyun Joong; 3. Kyu-jong; 4. Young-saeng; 5. Jung-min; 6. Hyung-jun; 7. Fan Page; 8. Thanks To; DVD: 1. PHOTO501 Start!; 2. "널 부르는 노래" (A Song Calling For You) - 1st broadcast 3. "두시탈출 컬투쇼"에서 생긴 일 4. "널 부르는 노래" (A Song Calling For You) - MV Photo session 5. Dream Concert rehearsals 6. SS501 go to Japan; 7. Hyun-joong’s Birthday; 8. Japan Fan Meeting; 9. Olympic broadcast retrospective 10. 3rd anniversary autograph session	—
The Mission	Released: May 13, 2009 (JPN); Publisher: Pony Canyon; Format: DVD	44
U R Man Special	Released: July 16, 2009 (KOR), July 24, 2009 (JPN); Publisher: Digital Apple, Medianet Pictures; Format: 2 DVD (KOR), 3 DVD (JPN); Track listing Disc 1: SS501 Showcase with Triple S: 1. Intro; 2. "경고" (Warning); 3. "데자뷰" (Deja Vu); 4. Photo501; 5. "Sandy" - from Musical Grease, Park Jung-min solo 6. "고맙다" (Thank You) - Kim Hyun-joong solo 7. "Want It"; 8. "U R Man"; 9. UFO Talk Time; 10. "I am" - Kim Hyung-jun solo 11. "Never Let You Go" - Kim Kyu-jong solo 12. "사랑인거죠" (Is It Love?) - Heo Young-saeng solo 13. "The One"; 14. "널 부르는 노래" (A Song Calling For You); 15. "넌 나의 천국" (You Are My Heaven); 16. "Snow Prince"; Disc 2: Special Making: Showcase Encore; 1. "겁쟁이" (Coward); 2. "Again"; 3. "U R Man"; Showcase Making Film; "U R MAN " - Making of MV; SS501 Project History; "널 부르는 노래" - Making of MV; Disc 3 (Japan Ver. only): SBS Broadcasting Special: Special Stage; 1. "Deja Vu"; 2. "君を歌う歌" (A Song Calling For You); 3. "U R Man"; 4. Appearance on Kim Jung-eun's Chocolate; Variety show appearances (Star King, 1000 Songs Challenge and more)	93
SS501 MBC Collection	Released: November 11, 2009 (JPN), December 29, 2009 (KOR); Publisher: Pride, Ein's M&M; Format: 3 DVD (Normal Edition), 4 DVD (Deluxe Edition); Track listing Disc 1 - 90min: MBC's SS501 History Documentary from debut to present including narration by SS501 and interviews; 1. Hyun-joong's Story; 2. Young-saeng's Story; 3. Kyu-jong's Story; 4. Jung-min's Story; 5. Hyung-jun's Story; Highlights from MBC programs including Happy Time, Thanks For Waking Me Up, Come To Play, Fantasy Partner, We Got Married, Entertainment Plus, Radio Star, Quiz To Change The World, Introducing Star's Friend, Man Won Happiness, Cheerful Hero, Star Special and more; Disc 2 - 110min: Performances; 1. "경고" (Warning); 2. "Never Again"; 3. "Everything"; 4. "Snow Prince"; 5. "Fighter"; 6. "겁쟁이" (Coward); 7. "Unlock"; 8. "4Chance"; 9. "데자뷰" (Deja Vu); 10. "널 부르는 노래" (A Song Calling For You); 11. "Find"; 12. "U R Man"; Music videos; 1. "경고" (Warning); 2. "Never Again"; 3. "Everything"; 4. "Snow Prince"; 5. "4Chance"; 6. "데자뷰" (Deja Vu); 7. "널 부르는 노래" (A Song Calling For You); 8. "U R Man"; Special Features; 1. Best Picture 1; 2. Best Picture 2; Disc 3 - 110min: Island Story in Kota Kinabalu, Malaysia; 1. Photo Session; 2. Water Sports; 3. Fan Meeting; 4. Full Story in Kota Kinabalu; Interviews; 1. Hyun-joong's Talk; 2. Young-saeng's Talk; 3. Kyu-jong's Talk; 4. Jung-min's Talk; 5. Hyung-jun's Talk; Member's Mission; 1. Hyun-joong's SelfCam; 2. Young-saeng's Sketch; 3. Kyu-jong's Pizza; 4. Jung-min's Cocktail; 5. Hyung-jun's Sandwich; SS501 in Exotic Island; 1. Kuala Lumpur Fanmeeting; 2. Kota Kinabalu; Disc 4 (Deluxe Ed. only) - 60min: Photobook Making Of / Photo Shoot in Kota Kinabalu	35
SS501 in USA Complete Edition - Special Off Shot	Released: March 26, 2010 (JPN); Publisher: TBS; Format: DVD; Track listing: SS501 in the United States behind-the-scenes footage; Photo shoot in Las Vegas, L.A. and San Francisco; 2008 Korean Music Festival footage; Interviews	55
1st Asia Tour Persona in Seoul	Released: March 26, 2010 (JPN), April 27, 2010 (KOR); Publisher: Seal Media Japan, Digital Apple; Format: 3 DVD; Track listing Disc 1: Concert: 1. Intro; 2. "데자뷰" (Deja Vu); 3. "Unlock"; 4. "경고" (Warning); 5. "4Chance" [Remix Ver.]; 6. "널 부르는 노래" (A Song Calling For You) [Remix Ver.]; 7. "Hey G" - Kim Hyung-jun solo 8. "Wuss Up" - Kim Kyu-jong solo 9. "Never Again"; 10. "내 머리가 나빠서" (Because I'm Stupid); 11. "하면은 안돼" (Only Me) - Park Jung-min solo 12. "U R Man"; 13. "Fighter"; 14. "이름없는 기억" (Nameless Memory) - Heo Young-saeng solo 15. "제발 잘해줘" (Please, Be Nice To Me) - Kim Hyun-joong solo 16. "하루만" (Only One Day); 17. "완.두.콩." (Green Peas); 18. "Love Like This"; Disc 2: Special Feature: Concert Encore; 1. "겁쟁이" (Coward); 2. "Bye Bye"; 3. "넌나의천국" (You Are My Heaven); Multiangles; 1. "널 부르는 노래" (A Song Calling for You); 2. "Love Like This"; VCR Making Film; Disc 3: Making: 1. Asia Tour Making: Seoul, Taiwan, Shanghai, Hong Kong; 2. Epilogue	33
Live At Budokan - Asia Tour Persona In Japan	Released: April 1, 2010 (TWN); Publisher: Warner Music Taiwan; Format: 2 DVD; Track listing Disc 1: 1. "Deja Vu"; 2. "Unlock"; 3. "警告" (Warning); 4. "4Chance"; 5. "La La La…為了妳" (A Song Calling For You); 6. "Hey G" - Kim Hyung-jun solo 7. "Story" - Kim Kyu-jong solo 8. "Wuss Up" - Kim Kyu-jong solo 9. "Never Again"; 10. "因為我太傻" (Because I'm Stupid); 11. "只有我?" (If You Cannot) - Park Jung-min solo 12. "U R Man"; 13. "Fighter"; 14. "空白的記憶" (Nameless Memory) - Heo Young-saeng solo 15. "請對我好一點" (Please, Be Nice To Me) - Kim Hyun-joong solo; Disc 2: 1. "Crazy 4 U"; 2. "只要一天" (Only One Day); 3. "豌豆公主" (Green Peas); 4. "Love Like This"; 5. Encore: "膽小鬼~懦弱的我" (Coward); 6. Curtain Call: "妳是我的天堂" (You're My Heaven); 7. Behind The Scenes of Budokan	—
SS501 Begins! The Route To Birth - 5th Anniversary Box	Released: July 19, 2010 (JPN); Publisher: SPO; Format: 4DVD (Box 1), 4DVD (Box 2); Track listing: Time before and after their debut; 2005 variety show M!Pick; Bonus footage; over 800 minutes of footage (each box over 400min); Box 1 Box 2	40
The 1st Asia Tour Persona Concert Making Story	Released: July 23, 2010 (JPN), September 10, 2010 (KOR); Publisher: SBS Production; Format: 3 DVD (JPN), 2 DVD (KOR); Track listing Korea Version Disc 1: The 1st Asia Tour Making Story: 1. Seoul; 2. Taipei; 3. Shanghai; 4. Hong Kong; 5. Bangkok; Disc 2: The 1st Asia Tour Making Story - Special Feature: 1. VCR Making Film; 2. Photo Slide Show; Japan Version Disc 1: The 1st Asia Tour Making Story - Part 1: 1. Seoul; 2. Taipei; 3. Shanghai; Disc 2: The 1st Asia Tour Making Story - Part 2: 1. Hong Kong; 2. Bangkok; Disc 3: The 1st Asia Tour Making Story - Special Feature: 1. VCR Making Film; 2. Photo Slide Show; 3. "ワン.ドゥ.コン" (Green Peas) Video Special	46
1st Asia Tour Persona in Seoul Encore	Released: August 27, 2010 (JPN), December 6, 2010 (KOR); Publisher: SBS Production; Format: 2 DVD; Track listing Disc 1: The Concert: 1. Intro; 2. "데자뷰" (Deja Vu); 3. "Unlock"; 4. "Obsess"; 5. "4Chance"; 6. "널 부르는 노래" (A Song Calling For You); 7. "잘 지내" - Kim Hyung-jun solo 8. "Never Let You Go" - Kim Kyu-jong solo 9. "Wuss Up" - Kim Kyu-jong solo 10. "Again"; 11. "서툰고백" (Confession); 12. "내 머리가 나빠서" (Because I'm Stupid); 13. "나 뿐인가요" - Park Jung-min solo 14. "Kiss" - Rainbow cover, Park Jung-min solo 15. "U R Man"; 16. "우리들만의 추억" - Heo Young-saeng solo 17. "Find" - Heo Young-saeng solo 18. "제발 잘해줘" (Please, Be Nice To Me) - Kim Hyun-joong solo 19. "Wasteland"; 20. "하루만" (Only One Day); 21. "Love Like This"; Disc 2: Special Feature: Concert Encore; 1. "Snow Prince"; 2. "겁쟁이" (Coward); 3. "Bye Bye"; 4. "넌 나의 천국" (You Are My Heaven); Special Talk Time; Multiangles; 1. "Obsess"; 2. "Wasteland"	34
2010 Special Concert in Saitama Super Arena	Released: December 22, 2010 (JPN); Publisher: SBS Production; Format: 2 DVD; Track listing Disc 1: The Concert: 1. Intro; 2. "Love Like This"; 3. "Obsess"; 4. "ホシゾラ" (Hoshizora); 5. "Again"; 6. "Wuss Up" - Kim Kyu-jong solo 7. "頼むからよくして" (Please, Be Nice To Me) - Kim Hyun-joong solo 8. "浅い夢の果て" - Park Jung-min solo 9. "Hey Girl" - Kim Hyung-jun solo 10. "負けないで" (Makenaide) - Zard cover, Heo Young-saeng solo 11. "恋人づくり" (Making A Lover); 12. "Snow Prince"; 13. "君を歌う歌" (A Song Calling For You); 14. "Deja Vu"; 15. "Be A Star"; 16. "弱虫" (Coward); Disc 2: Special Feature: Talk & Fan Meeting; Making Of; Multiangles; 1. "恋人づくり" (Making A Lover); 2. "Snow Prince"	125

=== Music videos ===
Year	Title	Album
Korean
2005	"Warning" (경고)	Warning
2005	"Never Again"	Warning
2005	"Everything"	Warning
2005	"Snow Prince"	Snow Prince
2006	"Fighter"	Snow Prince
2006	"Unlock"	S.T 01 Now
2006	"4Chance"	S.T 01 Now
2007	"Coward" (겁쟁이)	S.T 01 Now
2008	"Deja Vu" (데자뷰)	Deja Vu
2008	"A Song Calling For You" (널 부르는 노래)	Deja Vu
2008	"Find"	Find
2008	"You Are My Heaven" (넌나의천국)	Find
2009	Solo Collection [mini drama MV]	Solo Collection
2009	"Love Like This" (네게로) (For You)	Rebirth
2010	"Love Ya"	Destination
2010	"Let Me Be The One" (그게 나라고..)	Destination
Japanese
2007	"Kokoro"	Kokoro
2007	"Distance ~ Kimi To No Kyori" (君とのキョリ)	Distance ~ Kimi To No Kyori
2008	"Lucky Days"	Lucky Days
