= Save Us Tonight =

- Save Us Tonight album cover

Single by Park Jung-min
- Released: May 12, 2014
- Genre: J-pop; K-pop
- Label: Park Jungmin Inc.; Tower Records Shibuya
- Songwriters: miyakei, Park Jung-min, Daichi, Janne Hyoty

Park Jung-min singles chronology
"Tonight's the Night" (2012)	"Save Us Tonight" (2014)

"Save Us Tonight" is Park Jung-min's first original Japanese single. There are three editions of the single: the limited edition A, the limited edition B and the normal edition, as well as the Korean Edition.

== Track listing ==
No.	Title	Lyrics	Music	Arrangement	Length
1.	"Save Us Tonight"	miyakei, Park Jung-min	Daichi, Janne Hyoty	Janne Hyoty	3:41
2.	"I Feel You (Shadow Love)"	Park Jung-min	Alexander Holmgren, Denniz Jamm	Denniz Jamm	3:34
3.	"ふたり"	Park Jung-min	Kang Hyun-min	Kim Sang-hoon	3:39
4.	"Save Us Tonight" (instrumental)		Daichi, Janne Hyoty	Janne Hyoty	3:41
5.	"I Feel You (Shadow Love)" (instrumental)		Alexander Holmgren, Denniz Jamm	Denniz Jamm	3:34
6.	"ふたり" (instrumental)		Kang Hyun-min	Kim Sang-hoon	3:39
Total length:					21:47

Limited edition A
No.	Title	Lyrics	Music	Arrangement	Length
1.	"あなた以外誰も抱きしめない"	Nobuyoshi Nakazawa, Park Jung-min	Hwang Sung-je	Hwang Sung-je	4:04
2.	"Feel It"	Nobuyoshi Nakazawa, Park Jung-min	Shusui, Alexander Holmgren	Alexander Holmgren	3:40
3.	"ふたり"	Park Jung-min	Kang Hyun-min	Kim Sang-hoon	3:39
4.	"Save Us Tonight"	miyakei, Park Jung-min	DAICHI, Janne Hyoty	Janne Hyoty	3:41
5.	"あなた以外誰も抱きしめない" (instrumental)		Hwang Sung-je	Hwang Sung-je	4:04

Limited edition B
No.	Title	Lyrics	Music	Arrangement	Length
1.	Untitled	Park Jung-min	Alexander Holmgren, Denniz Jamm	Denniz Jamm	3:34
2.	"Feel It"	Nobuyoshi Nakazawa, Park Jung-min	Shusui, Alexander Holmgren	Alexander Holmgren	3:40
3.	"Save Us Tonight"	miyakei, Park Jung-min	DAICHI, Janne Hyoty	Janne Hyoty	3:41
4.	"ふたり"	Park Jung-min	Kang Hyun-min	Kim Sang-hoon	3:39
5.	"Feel It" (instrumental)		Shusui, Alexander Holmgren	Alexander Holmgren	3:40

Korean version
No.	Title	Lyrics	Music	Arrangement	Length
1.	"Save Us Tonight" (Korean ver.)	Park Jung-min	DAICHI, Janne Hyoty	Janne Hyoty	3:41
2.	"Now" (Korean ver. of "あなた以外誰も抱きしめない")	Park Jung-min	Hwang Sung-je	Hwang Sung-je	4:04
3.	"Feel It" (Korean ver.)	Park Jung-min	Shusui, Alexander Holmgren	Alexander Holmgren	3:40
4.	"I Feel You" (Shadow Love; Korean ver.)	Park Jung-min	Alexander Holmgren, Denniz Jamm	Denniz Jamm	3:34
5.	"귓가에" (Korean ver. of "ふたり")	Kang Hyun-min	Kang Hyun-min	Kim Sang-hoon	3:39

== Music videos ==
- Save Us Tonight
