= Fondant Garden =

2012 Taiwanese television series

- Also known as: Runaway Prince
- Genre: Drama
- Written by: Chen Hong Jie; Wang Xiu Xian; Jiang Jia Hua; Luo Qian Ni
- Directed by: Zhang Jia Zheng
- Starring: Park Jung-min; Jian Man-shu; Kingone Wang; Lia Lee; Johnny Lu
- Opening theme: "Maybe的機率" by Da Mouth
- Ending theme: "Love You (愛你)" by Kimberley Chen
- Country of origin: Taiwan
- Original languages: Mandarin; Korean
- No. of episodes: 16 episodes

Production
- Producer: Chai Zhi Bing
- Production locations: Taiwan; South Korea
- Production company: Comic International Productions Co., Ltd

Original release
- Network: CTV
- Release: February 24 – June 8, 2012

Fondant Garden (Chinese: 翻糖花園; pinyin: Fan Tang Hua Yuan) is a 2012 Taiwanese drama starring South Korean singer Park Jung-min, Jian Man-shu, Kingone Wang, and Lia Lee. The series was first broadcast in Taiwan on free-to-air China Television (CTV) on 24 February and ongoing for 16 episodes.

== Synopsis ==
Zheng Mi En (Jian Man Shu) is a talented pastry chef who works and manages at a successful bakery called Fondant Garden. Her boss and close friend from college, Chen Ai Lin (Lia Lee) always asks Mi En to bake cakes for her and pass them off as her own creations, convincing her prideful father that she is the one baking the amazing cakes. Ai Lin's father sends Ai Lin off to a fondant cake-making competition in Korea, causing Ai Lin to drag Mi En into her mesh of lies once again.

In the midst of this, Po Xi Huan/Park Hee Hwan (Park Jung Min) is a second-generation Taiwanese-Korean businessman from a Korean company who does not wish to inherit his family business. His father plans to use the upcoming cake competition as a way to force Xi Huan into an arranged marriage with the winner, who apparently has been chosen ahead of time. Xi Huan's Taiwanese half-brother, Yan Han Xiang (Kingone Wang) runs the family business division in Taiwan, but wants to be the successor of Xi Huan's father's company. Because of this, Han Xiang is a little annoyed that his younger half-brother is uninterested in taking over the business, and yet might inherit it instead of him.

== Cast ==
- Park Jung-min as Po Xi Huan / Park Hee-hwan (Voice：Eli Shih)

The lead male character, 24 years old, half-Korean, half-Taiwanese and is the rightful heir of CNR. He is gorgeous, lively and cunning, who has attracted many young women's hearts just by his shining smiles. He tends to pull off his mischievous practical jokes on people around him without any bad intention but only to bring people together. Even though Xi Huan's father has been bothered by his troublemaker son but his attempts of trying to discipline the black sheep of the family are always ruined by his mother. Xi Huan originally is a good-natured boy but his grandmother's indulgence has made him spoiled and selfish. After being forced to meet many women from other wealthy families, he desperately wants to get outside of his father's plans to transform him into a successful businessman and future leader of CNr by putting him in an arranged marriage. He escapes and hides in Taiwan, pretending that he lost his memory and going by the name "Han Ji." He is romantically interested in Zheng Mi En, even though he rarely shows his true feelings towards her but rather teasing and putting pranks on Mi En instead .

- Jian Man-shu as Zheng Mi En

Lead female character, the 22-year-old Fondant Garden's cake baker is cheerful, kind, and straightforward. Her mother died when she was really young. Unfortunately, her father, a talented baker and also her baking teacher, died in an accident after trying to deliver a birthday cake to a customer, thus leaving Mi En with her dream of becoming the best baker in the world while holding on to her promise with about her ill-fated father that she will bring the delightful, unique taste of his cake to everybody. She's an extremely talented baker and an excellent best friend to Ai Lin, although sometimes is pressured into making choices she doesn't want to do, including baking cakes under Ai Lin's name. She initially has a crush on Han Xiang and is annoyed at Xi Huan's immaturity but is later torn deciding between the brothers after Xi Huan's long stay at the cake store.

- Kingone Wang as Yan Han Xiang

Deputy General Manager of CNr's Taiwan branch. At 28 years old, Xi Huan's half brother is the son of Xi Huan's father and his first love. His true identity is only known by his father and grandmother. Unlike Xi Huan, Han Xiang is mature, performance driven, and an excellent businessman. All too often, his responsibilities include taking care of his childish half-brother. After accidentally meeting Mi En at a Korean cuisine restaurant, he also develops his feeling towards Mi En and rushes to confess with her in order to gain Xi Huan's place of CNr's successor, since he mistakes that her name is Chen Ai Lin.

- Lia Lee as Chen Ai Lin

Daughter of Sheng Na Duo Bao' is 22 years old. She's pretty, naive and hopelessly romantic. She is the owner of Fondant Garden cake store. For a while, she has been having Mi En bake cakes for her, which she passes off as her own. When her father sends her to South Korea to attend the cake baking competition, she launches into an elaborate plan to maintain her guise as an expert baker. She has a long going crush on her senior in college, which happens to be Han Xiang.

- Johnny Lu as Tan Rui

== Episodes ==
| No. | Title | Directed by | Written by | Ratings | Ranking | Original release date |
|---|---|---|---|---|---|---|
| 1 | "Cake×1" | Zhang Jia Zheng | Chen Hong Jie, Wang Xiu Xian, Jiang Jia Hua, Luo Qian Ni | 0.61 | 4 | February 24, 2012 |
Ai Lin's father sends her to the cake baking competition and drags Mi En along. Mi En meets Han Xiang.
| 2 | "Cake×2" | Zhang Jia Zheng | Chen Hong Jie, Wang Xiu Xian, Jiang Jia Hua, Luo Qian Ni | 0.61 | 3 | March 2, 2012 |
Mi En wins the cake baking competition. Xi Huan escapes to Taiwan and meets the crew at Fondant Garden.
| 3 | "Cake×3" | Zhang Jia Zheng | Chen Hong Jie, Wang Xiu Xian, Jiang Jia Hua, Luo Qian Ni | 0.69 | 3 | March 9, 2012 |
Han Xiang tries to meet Ai Lin and her family, but meets Mi En, thinking that she's Ai Lin. Xi Huan runs away to the beach and Mi En follows him.
| 4 | "Cake×4" | Zhang Jia Zheng | Chen Hong Jie, Wang Xiu Xian, Jiang Jia Hua, Luo Qian Ni | 0.83 | 3 | March 16, 2012 |
Mi En spends the day at the beach with Xi Huan. Han Xiang continually tries to reach "Ai Lin" and ends up meeting Ai Lin, thinking that she's Mi En, who professes her love to him.
| 5 | "Cake×5" | Zhang Jia Zheng | Chen Hong Jie, Wang Xiu Xian, Jiang Jia Hua, Luo Qian Ni | 0.70 | 3 | March 23, 2012 |
Xi Huan learns how to make himself useful at Fondant Garden. Mi En delivers cakes to Han Xiang and Xi Huan tags along. Han Xiang and Xi Huan both realize that they may be competing for Mi En's affections.
| 6 | "Cake×6" | Zhang Jia Zheng | Chen Hong Jie, Wang Xiu Xian, Jiang Jia Hua, Luo Qian Ni | 0.70 | 3 | March 30, 2012 |
Xi Huan tries and distract Ai Lin at the amusement park while Mi En and Han Xiang hang out. Ai Lin finally realizes that Han Xiang likes Mi En, and Mi En considers telling Han Xiang the truth because he proposed.

== Soundtrack ==
| Type | Song title | Artist | Lyricist | Composer |
|---|---|---|---|---|
| Opening credits | "Maybe的機率 (Maybe)" | Da Mouth | A Di Zai | A Di Zai |
| Incidental music | "So Good" | Kimberley | | |
| Incidental music | "壞人 (Villain)" | Park Jung Min | William Wei | William Wei |
| Closing credits | "愛你 (Love You)" | Kimberley | Huang Zhu Yin | Tao Shan |
