= Midnight Theatre =

- Midnight Theatre (Normal edition) cover

Studio album by ROMEO
- Released: December 19, 2012
- Genre: J-pop
- Label: Victor Entertainment; Colourful Records

Singles from Midnight Theatre
- 1. "Give Me Your Heart" Released: September 5, 2012; 2. "Tonight's the Night" Released: October 31, 2012

Midnight Theatre is ROMEO's first full Japanese length studio album. Released on December 19, 2012 and consists of 14 tracks, including previously released songs from Give Me Your Heart and Tonight's the Night.

== Track listing ==
No.	Title	Lyrics	Music	Length
1.	"Act I (The Awakening)"		Jeff Miyahara	0:29
2.	"Until The End Of Time"	Junji Ishiwatari	Jeff Miyahara, Markus Bogelund	4:04
3.	"Devil"	Kanata Okajima	Jeff Miyahara, Erik Lidbom	3:44
4.	"Sin"	miyakei	Jeff Miyahara, Enik Lin	4:01
5.	"Tonight's The Night"	Tarantula	her0ism, Samuel Waermo, Jeff Miyahara	3:27
6.	"Act II (The Heart)"		Jeff Miyahara	0:42
7.	"Lover's Spirit"	Satomi	Jeff Miyahara, Erik Lidbom	3:04
8.	"Give Me Your Heart"	Kanata Okajima	Jeff Miyahara, Erik Lidbom	4:17
9.	"君を、守りたい"	Kenn Kato	Jeff Miyahara	3:32
10.	"No Turning Back"	miyakei	Fredrik Thomander	2:42
11.	"Act III (The Desire)"		Jeff Miyahara	0:30
12.	"One More Night"	Kanata Okajima	Jeff Miyahara, Didrik Thott, Sebastian Thott	3:53
13.	"Hide And Seek Love"	Junji Ishiwatari	Jeff Miyahara, Erik Lidbom	3:37
14.	"Voyage"	miyakei	Jeff Miyahara	4:42

Limited edition A: Bonus DVD
No.	Title	Length
1.	"Romeo 2nd Contact" (Special Video)
2.	"Tonight's The Night (Music video)" (Short Ver.)

== Release history ==
Country	Date	Distributing label	Format
Japan	December 19, 2012	Victor Entertainment; Colourful Records	CD (Normal Edition)
Japan	December 19, 2012	Victor Entertainment; Colourful Records	CD+DVD (Limited Edition A)
Japan	December 19, 2012	Victor Entertainment; Colourful Records	CD (Limited Edition B)
