= Not Alone (Park Jung-min song) =

- Not Alone cover

Single by Park Jung-min

from the album The, Park Jung Min
- Released: January 20, 2011
- Recorded: 2010–2011 in Seoul, South Korea
- Genre: K-pop, dance, classical, orchestral
- Length: 22:02
- Label: CNr Media; LOEN Entertainment (Korea); Yamaha Music Media (Japan); Sony Music (Taiwan)
- Songwriters: Park Jung-min, Shinsadong Tiger
- Producer: Shinsadong Tiger

Park Jung-min singles chronology
"Not Alone" (2011)	"Beautiful" (2012)

Music video
- "Not Alone" on YouTube

Not Alone is the debut Korean solo single of Park Jung-min of South Korean boy band SS501. It was released on 20 January 2011 by CNr Media and distributed by LOEN Entertainment. The single album was originally planned to be released on 25 November 2010, but due to the rising tensions between South Korea and North Korea, Park and his company decided to push back his album release and promotions to the beginning of 2011.

Park Jung-min joined hands with the star producer Shinsadong Tiger in order to create the single album. Park is also involved in the album production as a lyricist. From the title song "Not Alone" to "넌 알고 있니" and "내 하루는 매일매일 크리스마스", Park Jung-min personally participated in the composition of the lyrics.

The single was also released in Japan on 17 February 2011. The release is in the form of a CD Book, which combines a physical CD along with an 8-page A5 sized photo book.

== Track listing ==
No.	Title	Lyrics	Music	Arrangement	Length
1.	"Not Alone"	Park Jung-min	Shinsadong Tiger	Shinsadong Tiger	3:53
2.	"넌 알고 있니 (Do You Know?)"	Park Jung-min	Shinsadong Tiger	Shinsadong Tiger	3:43
3.	"내 하루는 매일매일 크리스마스 (Every Day is Christmas)"	Park Jung-min, Kang Hyun-min	Kang Hyun-min	Kang Hyun-min	3:24
4.	"Not Alone" (Instrumental)		Shinsadong Tiger	Shinsadong Tiger	3:54
5.	"넌 알고 있니 (Do You Know?)" (Instrumental)		Shinsadong Tiger	Shinsadong Tiger	3:43
6.	"내 하루는 매일매일 크리스마스 (Every Day is Christmas)" (Instrumental)		Kang Hyun-min	Kang Hyun-min	3:22
Total length:					22:02

Japan Edition
No.	Title	Length
1.	"Not Alone" (Japanese version)
2.	"君は知ってる？～届かないメッセージ～ (Do You Know?)" (Japanese version)
3.	"毎日クリスマス (Everyday is Christmas)" (Japanese version)
4.	"Not Alone" (Instrumental)
5.	"君は知ってる？～届かないメッセージ～ (Do You Know?)" (Instrumental)
6.	"毎日クリスマス (Everyday is Christmas)" (Instrumental)

== Music videos ==
- "Not Alone"

== Release history ==
Country	Date	Format	Distributing label
South Korea	20 January 2011	CD, digital download	LOEN Entertainment
Worldwide	20 January 2011	digital download	LOEN Entertainment
Japan	22 January 2011	CD	LOEN Entertainment
Japan	17 February 2011	CD	Yamaha Music Media (Japan Edition)
Taiwan	28 January 2011	CD	Sony Music (Taiwan Edition)

== Charts ==
Album	Peak position				
Album	Gaon Weekly Album Chart	Gaon Monthly Album Chart	Five Music J-Pop/K-Pop Chart	G-Music J-Pop/K-Pop Chart	G-music Combo Chart
Not Alone	3	5	4 (Taiwan edition)	2	5

=== Sales and certifications ===
Chart (Not Alone)	Units sold	Notes
Gaon	16,439+	Statistics from January to February 2011
Hanteo	17,500+	Statistics from January to September 2011
