= Jeff Miyahara =

Japanese musician (born 1977)

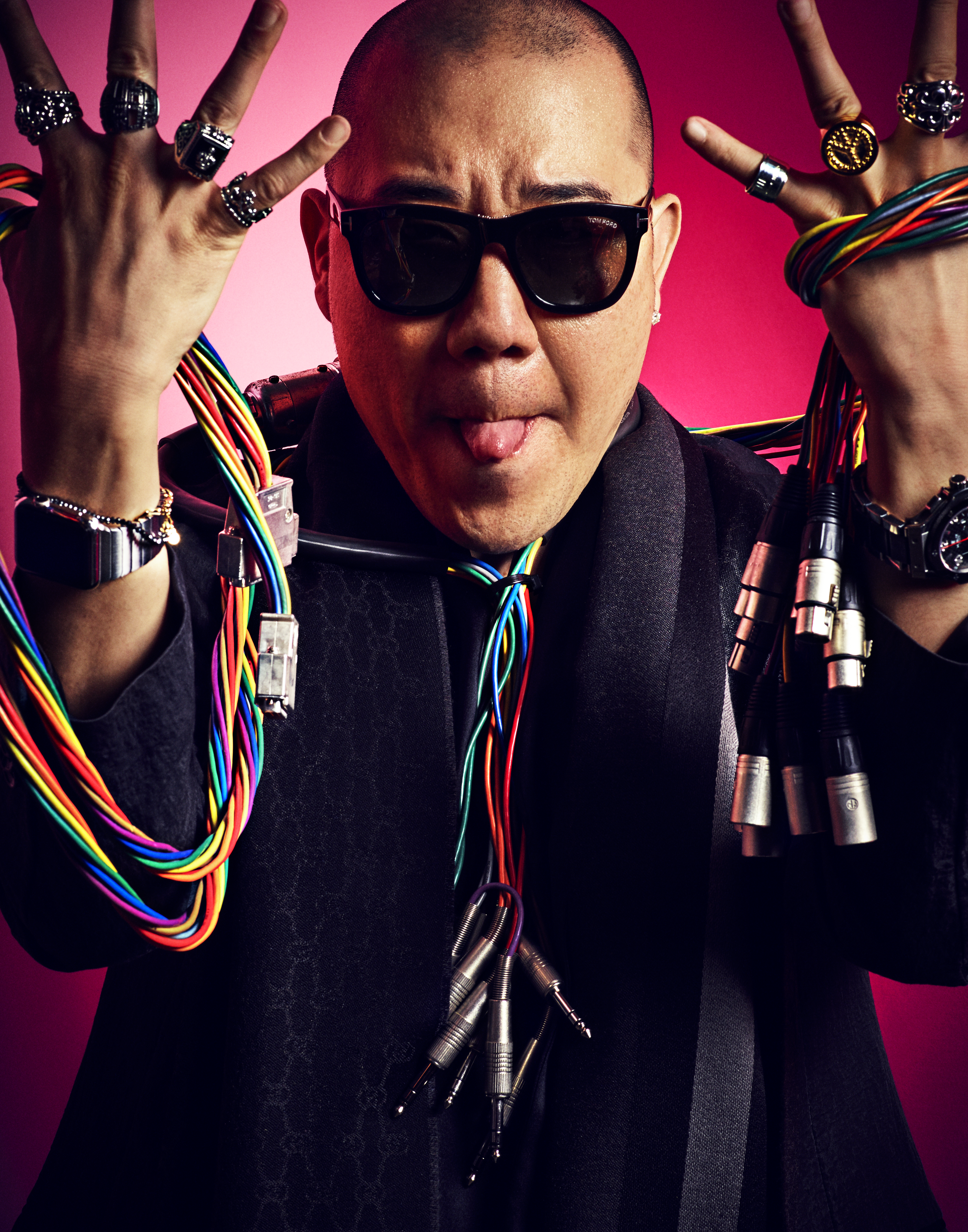
- Miyahara in 2016
- Born: February 4, 1977 (age 49)
- Occupations: Record producer; songwriter
- Employer: Hybe Japan
- Musical career
- Origin: Tokyo, Japan
- Years active: 1999–present

Jeff Miyahara (born February 4, 1977) is a Japanese record producer and songwriter based in Tokyo, Japan. He is the chief creative officer for the Japanese branch of HYBE.

Beginning his career in the music industry in 1999, he has worked with many Japanese artists such as JUJU, Kana Nishino, Namie Amuro, TVXQ, Weather Girls, as well as international artists like Boyz II Men, Girls' Generation, and Timbaland. He has accrued many Oricon rated No. 1 Digital Download hits, including "Kimi No Subete Ni" by Spontania ft. JUJU and JASMINE's "sad to say". He was awarded several Gold Disc Awards by the Recording Industry Association of Japan in 2005, 2008, 2009, and was titled Nikkei Entertainment's "Hitmaker of the Year" in 2010. He has sold over 40 million units to date.

In 2009, Miyahara signed a deal with UM360, the management division of Universal Music Japan, after the success of his 2008 breakout hit "Kiminosubeteni", a hip-pop track he produced for Spontania featuring JUJU, which sold over 5 million digital downloads. That same year he was involved in the release of over fifty CDs. He has also collaborated with performers from Taiwan, Hong Kong, and Australia.

Miyahara has cited his background as a Japanese of ethnic Korean origin raised in the United States as the foundation on which his approach to songwriting and production is conceived.

== Biography ==
During his teenage years Miyahara began playing guitar and was impressed both by heavy metal and the burgeoning MTV culture of mainstream music in the 1980s.

While Miyahara was still in school he developed his skills as a music producer. During this same period he traveled to Korea, where he became friends with other musicians of similar backgrounds and first began taking part in recording sessions as a producer.

In 1999, he commenced his full scale music career. In 2002, Miyahara released his first song as a producer, "Tsubasa wo kudasai", which was used as the theme song for Japan's national team in the 2002 FIFA World Cup, co-hosted by Japan and Korea.

Miyahara's breakthrough success came in August 2008 with the release of Spontania feat. JUJU's "Kiminosubeteni", which he produced. The song reached number 1 on the USEN chart, fourth in the yearly iTunes ranking "Kimi No Subete Ni" and was downloaded over 5 million times. In 2009, another of Miyahara's productions, JUJU feat. JAY'ED "Ashitagakurunara" ranked No. 1 on the Chaku Uta hit charts "Ashita Ga Kuru Nara".

== J-POP Music Group ==
Miyahara's most recent project is the J-POP Music Group, which is composed of musicians, studio, and public relations personnel. Among the singers whose careers have been shaped by this project is Chris Hart, who was discovered and developed under the guidance of Miyahara and J-POP.

== Discography ==
Jeff Miyahara discography
- Studio albums: 164
- Compilation albums: 15
- Singles: 176
- Best: 10

=== Singles ===
Released	Single	Artist	Label	Title
2002/5/22	翼をください	V.A.	Dreamusic	翼をください
2003/5/08	Hey Now	three NATION	ARTIMAGE	全楽曲
2003/7/24	ナナコロビ	three NATION	EMI MUSIC JAPAN	全楽曲
2003/10/01	Honey B	three NATION	EMI MUSIC JAPAN	全楽曲
2004/2/25	Don't STOP!	three NATION	EMI MUSIC JAPAN	全楽曲
2004/6/16	Olivia Once Again	three NATION	EMI MUSIC JAPAN	全楽曲
2004/12/01	Who Is It?	three NATION	EMI MUSIC JAPAN	全楽曲
2005/1/01	夢の場所へ	w-inds.	Pony Canyon	夢の場所へ
2007/2/14	Softly	Leah Dizon	Victor Entertainment	Fever
2007/4/04	Positivity	Spontania	Far Eastern Tribe Records	全楽曲
2007/6/20	"HANABI"/It's OK	Spontania	Far Eastern Tribe Records	全楽曲
2007/7/04	I Need To Wake Up ~約束~	不都合な真実主題歌日本語ﾊﾞｰｼﾞｮﾝ	Movie: Inconvenient Truth	I Need To Wake Up ~約束~
2007/8/22	ALIVE	WISE	UNIVERSAL SIGMA	ALIVE
2007/11/21	Everybody	Turtles 4 feat. Metis, SPEECH, WISE, JAMIL	Crown Records	全楽曲
2008年
2008/4/02	サヨナラ...	Spontania	Far Eastern Tribe Records	全楽曲
2008/5/21	Superwoman	JAY'ED	Toys Factory	Superwoman
2008/7/16	ONE	Crystal Kay	Epic Records Japan Inc.	すき
2008/8/13	君のすべてに	Spontania feat. JUJU	Far Eastern Tribe Records	全楽曲
2008/8/27	ずっと一緒	JAY'ED	Toys Factory	ずっと一緒 / Missing
2008/10/01	夏のかけら	Aqua Timez	Epic Records Japan Inc.	夏のかけら
2008/11/26	素直になれたら JUJU feat. Spontania / I can be free	JUJU	Sony Music Associated Records	素直になれたら
2008/12/03	君がいるだけで/さぁ行こう！	YA-KYIM	Warner Music Japan	君がいるだけで / ト・モ・ダ・チ
2009年
2009/1/28	今でもずっと	Spontania	Far Eastern Tribe Records	全楽曲
2009/3/18	Bitter Sweet	傳田真央	Universal J	全楽曲
2009/4/01	ふりむかないで feat. Hiromi	WISE	UNIVERSAL SIGMA	Unchain my heart feat. May J.
2009/4/22	NHKみんなのうた コイシテイルカ	さかなクン	Imperial Records	コイシテイルカ
2009/4/29	きっと	Spontania feat. 橋本聖子	Far Eastern Tribe Records	きっと
2009/4/29	明日がくるなら	JUJU with JAY'ED	Sony Music Associated Records	明日がくるなら
2009/6/03	君に会いたくなるから	西野カナ	SME	君に会いたくなるから
2009/6/17	スピリット	V6	Avex Entertainment	Desert Eagle
2009/6/24	sad to say	JASMINE	Sony Music Associated Records	sad to say
2009/7/01	泣きたくなるけど	傳田真央	Universal J	泣きたくなるけど/Bitter Sweet
2009/7/22	Comoesta feat. Massattack from Spontania	Mass Alert	SE	Comoesta feat. Mass attack from Spontania
2009/7/22	SHOCK-運命-	黒木メイサ	SMR	SHOCK-運命- Wasted
2009/7/22	CRY FOR YOU/Can't Let Go	JAY'ED	Toys Factory	CRY FOR YOU
2009/8/26	First Love~ラブレター~	Love	Sony Music Associated Records	ラブレター
2009/9/09	Another Story ~AI「Story」Spontania Version~	Spontania	Far Eastern Tribe Records	Another Story ~「Story」Spontania Version~
2009/10/21	同じ空みつめてるあなたに	Spontania	Far Eastern Tribe Records	同じ空みつめてるあなたに
2009/10/28	NO MORE	JASMINE	Sony Music Associated Records	NO MORE / What You Want?
2009/11/18	WHY	加藤ミリヤ	Sony Music Entertainment	Destiny
2009/11/25	My Style	傳田真央	Universal J	My Style
2010年
2010/01/27	Never Never Give Up	舞花	Yamaha	Never Never Give Up
2010/01/27	THE LOVE SONGS	Spontania	Far Eastern Tribe Records	Take My Heart /「サヨナラ...」
2010/01/27	Fall in Love	青山テルマ×SOL from BIGBANG	Universal J	Fall in Love
2010/02/17	思い出になるの？	玉置成実	Universal J	思い出になるの？
2010/02/17	片思イノ想イカタ	Jamil	Pony Canyon	片思イノ想イカタ
2010/02/24	桜雨	JUJU	Sony Music Associated Records	READY FOR LOVE
2010/03/03	This is not a game	JASMINE	Sony Music Associated Records	This is not a game
2010/03/03	帰る場所	青山テルマ	Universal J	帰る場所
2010/03/10	旅立つキミへ	RSP	Sony Music Entertainment	旅立つキミへ
2010/03/17	Now or Never	スポンテニア	Far Eastern Tribe Records	Now or Never
2010/03/31	FAKE	AI feat.安室奈美恵	UNIVERSAL SIGMA	Family
2010/04/07	JEALOUS	JASMINE	Sony Music Associated Records	JEALOUS
2010/04/07	Cherry	紗羅マリー	Avex Entertainment	Cherry/Gossip
2010/05/12	DREAMIN'	JASMINE	Sony Music Associated Records	DREAMIN'
2010/05/26	はなさないでよ feat. 青山テルマ	SoulJa	UNIVERSAL SIGMA	はなさないでよ
2010/06/02	FIVE	黒木メイサ	SMR	FIVE
2010/06/02	JAM	スポンテニア	Far Eastern Tribe Records	JAM
2010/06/09	Yellow Stop	Manami	TOYS FACTORY	Yellow Stop
2010/07/07	Mirror Mirror feat. COMA-CHI	紗羅マリー	Avex Entertainment	Mirror Mirror feat. COMA-CHI
2010/07/21	二人でなくちゃ	Jamil	Pony Canyon	二人でなくちゃ
2010/09/01	NICE AND NAUGHTY	ビビアン・スー	Far Eastern Tribe Records	NICE AND NAUGHTY
2010/09/22	Breathe	ISSA×SoulJa	Avex Entertainment	Breathe
2010/11/17	CHANGE UR WORLD	KA-TUN	J-one Records	GIVE ME, GIVE ME, GIVE ME
2010/12/15	"愛してる"のOne Word	LOVE	Sony Music Associated Records	"愛してる"のOne Word
2010/12/15	TURE	JAY'ED	Toys Factory	TURE
2011/1/19	Fabulous Life	Mýa	Manhattan Recordings	Fabulous Life
2011年
2011/02/02	ONE	JASMINE	SMAR	dear my friend [MIGHTY CROWN REMIX], Deamin'[acoustic 201012/12 Live in the Dark ver.]
2011/03/09	最後の恋	HIROKO	UNIVERSAL J	最後の恋
2011/03/16	By your side feat.西野カナ	WISE	UNIVERSAL SIGMA	By your side feat.西野カナ, Dance with me feat.miray
2011/04/06	さよならの代わりに/願い	JUJU	SMAR	さよならの代わりに
2011/04/27	I loved you feat.HIROKO	WISE	UNIVERSAL SIGMA	I loved you feat.HIROKO
2011/06/01	また明日•••	JUJU	SMAR	Love again
2011/06/15	ヒカリ	Lena	FET	ヒカリ/Daydraming
2011/07/06	時を止めて feat.WISE	Tiara	NIPPON CROWN	時を止めて feat.WISE
2011/07/27	ONLY YOU	JASMINE	SMAR	Addiction
2011/08/01	TILL THE END OF THE WORLD	LIL' EDDIE	LEXINGTON	TILL THE END OF THE WORLD
2011/08/31	Wired Life	黒木メイサ	SMR	UPGRADE U!
2011/09/14	君でよかった	スポンテニア	FET	君でよかった
2011/09/28	SOMEBODY TO LOVE	紗羅マリー	avex trax	SOMEBODY TO LOVE
2011/10/05	君じゃない誰かなんて〜Tejina〜	DEEP	rhythm zone	OHOH
2011/10/12	i hate you	ISSA×SoulJa	avex trax	i hate you
2011/11/30	Winter Rose	東方神起	avex trax	Winter Rose
2011/12/10	永遠はなくても	真崎ゆか	UNIVERSAL J	永遠はなくても
2012年
2012/02/29	愛、テキサス	山下智久	Warner Music Japan	PERFECT CRIME
2012/03/07	SAKURA, I love you?	西野カナ	SME Records	SAKURA, I love you?
2012/05/02	Two Hearts	三浦大知	SONIC GROOVE	Two Hearts
2012/05/16	LOST	GLORY HILL	Warner Music Japan	LOST, アスタリスク, Lies and Truth
2012/06/20	MAGIC	SHOW	Pony Canyon	MAGIC, Going Down
2012/06/27	PAPARAZZI	GIRLS' GENERATION	NAYUTAWAVE RECORDS	(creative supervisor)
2012/07/11	Memories	ローラ	Universal International	Memories
2012/07/25	GO FOR IT!!	西野カナ	SME	SUMMER TIME
2012/07/25	Best Partner	JASMINE	SMAR	Best Partner, B*TCH*S, Touch Me On The Beach
2012/08/08	0~ZERO~	三代目J Soul Brothers	rhythm zone	Kiss You Tonight
2012/08/22	forget-me-not~ワスレナグサ〜	FLOWER	SMAR	YOUR GRAVITY
2012/09/05	Give Me Your Heart	ROMEO	ビクターエンタテインメント	Give Me Your Heart, Devil,
2012/09/26	Oh!	GIRLS' GENERATION	NAYUTAWAVE RECORDS	(creative supervisor)
2012/10/10	Dazzling Girl	SHINee	EMIミュージックジャパン	(creative supervisor)
2012/10/17	Weather Forecast of Love (恋の天気予報)	Weather Girls	Pony Canyon	Weather Forecast of Love (恋の天気予報), Loving Pass~Love Password~ (Loving Pass ～恋のパスワード～)
2012/10/31	Tonight's The Night	ROMEO	ビクターエンタテインメント	Tonight's The Night, Dream Out Loud, 君を、守りたい, LOVER'S SPIRIT, Hide and Seek Love, Sin
2012/11/17	ただいま	TWIN CROSS	Shima	ただいま、群星（ムリブシ）
2012/11/21	FLOWER POWER	GIRLS' GENERATION	NAYUTAWAVE RECORDS	FLOWER POWER, BEEP BEEP, Smash-Up (creative supervisor)
2012/11/21	If You Want	J-Min	NAYUTAWAVE RECORDS	If You Want, Cry Baby (creative supervisor)
2012/12/26	TREASURE	GLORY HILL	ワーナミュージック・ジャパン	TREASURE, No Way Back, LETTER
2012/11/28	MONSTERS	The MONSTERS	ビクターエンタテインメント	MONSTERS
2013年
2013/2/6	Heartbeat Storm Warning is Love (恋はトキメキ注意報)	Weather Girls	Pony Canyon	Heartbeat Storm Warning is Love (恋はトキメキ注意報)
2013/2/27	Mistake!/Battery	SMAP	ビクターエンタテインメント	Battery
2013/3/13	Heart Theater	J-Min	NAYUTAWAVE RECORDS	Heart Theater, Looking For A Hero (creative supervisor)
2013/4/24	ただいま/NAMIDA	TWIN CROSS	トイズファクトリー	ただいま, NAMIDA
2013/4/24	SPARK	三代目J Soul Brothers	rhythm zone	Higher
2013/5/01	home	クリス・ハート	UNIVERSAL SIGMA	home,たしかなこと,旅立つ日
2013/6/05	Love of Love♥Sunshine (恋のラブ♥サンシャイン)	Weather Girls	Pony Canyon	Love of Love♥Sunshine (恋のラブ♥サンシャイン), Tonight's Weather
2013/6/19	Love & Girls	GIRLS' GENERATION	NAYUTAWAVE RECORDS	Love & Girls,リンガ・フランカ
2013/6/26	Tail of Hope	BoA	avex trax	Tail of Hope
2013/7/24	星影	DEEP	rhythm zone	Tell Me It's Real
2013/7/24	ありがとう	竹本洋介	スペースシャワーネットワーク	ありがとう
2013/8/21	Ocean Blue	塩ノ谷 早耶香	キングレコード	Ocean Blue
2013/8/21	Boys Meet U	SHINee	EMIミュージックジャパン	
2013/9/18	GALAXY SUPERNOVA	GIRLS' GENERATION	NAYUTAWAVE RECORDS	(creative supervisor)
2013/10/23	Message/Call my name	BoA	avex trax	
2013/10/30	夢がさめて	松田聖子 & クリス・ハート	UNIVERSAL SIGMA	夢がさめて,もう一度抱きしめたい
2013/11/06	Snow Flakes Love/一輪花	塩ノ谷 早耶香	キングレコード	to you
2013/11/20	HEY BOY~For What Reason?~ (HEY BOY～ウェイシェンモ?～)	Weather Girls	Pony Canyon	HEY BOY~For What Reason?~ (HEY BOY～ウェイシェンモ?～), OMG!
2013/12/04	3 2 1	SHINee	EMIミュージックジャパン	3 2 1, Colors of the season
2013/12/18	シャレオツ/ハロー	SMAP	ビクターエンタテインメント	シャレオツ,シャレオツ(Jeff Miyahara Remix)
2014年
2014/2/26	I LOVE YOU	クリス・ハート	UNIVERSAL SIGMA	全楽曲収録
2014/3/05	Shout It Out	BoA	avex trax	(creative supervisor)
2014/3/05	Tomorrow World	Weather Girls	Pony Canyon	Tomorrow World, Talk Talk Talk
2014/6/04	Like a flower	塩ノ谷 早耶香	キングレコード	Like a flower
2014/6/04	Like You ♡ Anyway	Weather Girls	Pony Canyon	Like You ♡ Anyway
2014/6/11	夢で逢えるのに 〜Sometimes I Cry〜	w-inds.	Pony Canyon	Say so long
2014/6/25	LUCKY STAR	SHINee	EMIミュージックジャパン	LUCKY STAR
2014/7/16	Just The Way You Are	DEEP	rhythm zone	Just The Way You Are
2014/7/23	MASAYUME CHASING	BoA	avex trax	(creative supervisor)
2014/8/20	NIGHT PARADE	AKANE LIV	Victor	NIGHT PARADE, Reborn
2014/8/27	蒼い星	柴咲コウ	Victor	蒼い星
2014/10/15	好き	西野カナ	SME	I Say No
2014/12/03	FLY	BoA	avex trax	(creative supervisor)
2014/12/17	COME PARTY！	板野友美	キングレコード	COME PARTY！
2015年
2015/3/11	Your Number	SHINee	EMIミュージックジャパン	Your Number, LOVE
2015/4/15	続く道withゴスペラーズ	クリス・ハート	UNIVERSAL SIGMA	全楽曲収録
2015/6/15	ラブ・クリック	KARA	UNIVERSAL MUSIC	Composer
2015/6/28	No Girls No Fun / Delightful Days	GEM	iDOL Street	No Girls No Fun
2015/6/28	Join Hands	Super Junior - K.R.Y.	Avex Entertainment	Join Hands
2015/10/16	Sing Your Song	SHINee	EMIミュージックジャパン	(creative supervisor)
2015/10/23	Love & Money	Jeff Miyahara ft Paul Ballard	TV Sitcom: 恋の時価総額 Love & Money	Love & Money
2015/11/04	FIRST KISS	MACO	Delicious Deli Records	(Music Creative Director)
2015/12/28	Lookbook	BoA	avex trax	Lookbook
2016年
2016/02/17	僕はここに生きていく	Chris Hart	UNIVERSAL SIGMA	全楽曲収録
2015/5/30	君のせいで	SHINee	EMIミュージックジャパン	(Creative Supervisor)
2016/07/27	さよならひとり	TAEMIN	UNIVERSAL MUSIC	(Creative Supervisor)
2016/10/03	いのちの理由	Chris Hart	UNIVERSAL SIGMA	全楽曲収録
2016/10/19	Freeze	Nicholas Edwards	Pony Canyon	全収録
2016/11/02	4 WALLS/COWBOY	f(x)	avex trax	(Creative Supervisor)
2016/12/07	Coming Over	EXO	avex trax	(Creative Supervisor)
2016/12/14	サネカズラ	Howl Be Quiet	Pony Canyon	(Creative Supervisor)
2016/12/21	Winter Wonderland	SHINee	EMIミュージックジャパン	(Creative Supervisor)
2017年
2017/01/11	Toxic Love	ROMEO	Park Jungmin inc	全収録
2017/02/06	ウルトラマンオーブ THE ORIGIN SAGA – Themes –	FUTURE BOYZ	avex trax	TRUE FIGHTER
2017/03/15	Motion	西内まりや	avex trax	(Creative Director)
2017/05/17	#いいね！	板野友美	King Records	#いいね!
2017/07/14	Sora	NOISEMAKER	A-Sketch	(160th)
2017/07/14	あの日のキミと今の僕に	DOBERMAN INFINITY	LDH RECORDS	
2017/11/29	Venus	Anly	Sony Music	
2018年
2018/01/31	Countdown	EXO	Avex Entertainment Inc	(Music Creative Director)
2018/01/31	虹色進化論	たこやきレインボー	Avex Entertainment Inc	(Written and Produced)
2018/02/13	私このままでいいのかな	BoA	Avex Entertainment Inc	(Music Creative Director)
2018/02/21	ダブルレインボー	たこやきレインボー	Avex Entertainment Inc	(Written and Produced)
2018/02/28	Beautiful	Anly	Sony Music Labels	(Produced and Arranged)
2018/02/28	Just as I am	Tomomi Itano	King Records	(Produced)
2018/03/14	Unchained	BoA	Avex Entertainment Inc	(Music Creative Director)
2018/04/18	OFF ROAD	DOBERMAN INFINITY	LDH MUSIC	(Written and Produced)
2018/04/18	FROM NOW ON	SHINee	Universal Music	(Music Creative Director)
2018/05/09	MAGIC	EXO-CBX	Avex Entertainment Inc	(Music Creative Director)
2018/05/23	Chain	NCT 127	Avex Entertainment Inc	(Music Creative Director)
2018/06/15	Stay	Taeyeon	SM Entertainment	(Music Creative Director)
2018/07/25	Loop	Anly	Sony Music Labels	(Music Creative Director)
2018/08/01	Sunny Side	SHINee	Universal Music	(Music Creative Director)
2019年
2019/05/02	Amor	BoA	Avex Entertainment Inc	(Music Creative Director)
2019/05/02	Memoria	GFRIEND	King Records	(Vocal Producer)
2019/05/02	PAPER CUTS	EXO CBX	Avex Entertainment Inc	(Music Creative Director)
2019/05/03	Don't Think Twice ～桜並木の面影にゆれて～	長渕剛 Tsuyoshi Nagabuchi	Universal Music	(Music Producer)
2019/05/03	Amen	長渕剛 Tsuyoshi Nagabuchi	Universal Music	(Music Producer)
2019/05/03	Don't Think Twice ～桜並木の面影にゆれて～	長渕剛 Tsuyoshi Nagabuchi	Universal Music	(Music Producer)
2019/05/03	Shake Your Body	ReN	Booost music	(Music Producer)
2019/05/03	Wakey-Wakey	NCT 127	Avex Entertainment Inc	(Music Creative Director)
2019/05/03	君を待ってる	King & Prince	Universal Music	(Song Placement)
2019/05/03	Sappy	Red Velvet	Avex Entertainment Inc	(Music Creative Director)
2019/05/13	True To You	Miyu Saki	Universal Music	(Composer & Music Producer)
2019/07/27	Fight for your heart	三浦春馬 Haruma Miura	A-Sketch	(Composer & Music Producer)
2019/08/30	Famous	TAEMIN	Universal Music	(Music Creative Director)
2019/11/21	愛をクダサイ Beginning	PRIZMAX	Startdust Records	(Composer & Music Producer)
2020年
2020/03/26	沈黙のEXPLOSION	TOKYO MONSTERS feat. IMALU	J-COM	(Composer & Music Producer)
2020/05/08	through the dark	安田レイ Rei Yasuda	Sony Music	(Composer & Music Producer)
2020/07/16	Reyy	t-Ace	P-VINE	(Vocal Producer)
2020/09/10	SUPER★DRAGON	SUPER★DRAGON	Stardust Records	(Music Producer)
2020/09/10	SAMURAI	SUPER★DRAGON	Stardust Records	(Music Producer)
2020/11/18	#GirlsSpkOut	TAEYEON	Universal Music	(Music Creative Director)
2020/12/20	Orion	KEYTALK	Universal Music	(Music Producer)
2020/12/23	So Far Gone	Jhonatan	Universal Music	(Music Producer)
2021年
2021/03/11	HOURGLASS	UVERworld	Sony Music	(Music Producer)
2021/03/11	Get You Back	Nissy	Avex Entertainment	(Vocal Producer)
2021/04/30	Say Yes	Nissy	Avex Entertainment	(Vocal Producer)
2021/08/26	Do Do	Nissy	Avex Entertainment	(Vocal Producer)

=== Albums ===
Released	Album	Artist	Label	Title
2000年
2000/2/25	ブギーポップは笑わない ~Boogiepop Phantom		Media Factory	
2001年
2001/11/21	Amazing Grace		EMI MUSIC JAPAN	
2003年
2003/7/09	アースビート(2)	V.A.	EMI MUSIC JAPAN	
2004年
2004/1/21	Otakarasagashi	Deli	Cutting Edge	
2004/6/30	3N	three NATION	EMI MUSIC JAPAN	Hey Now/ナナコロビ/Honey B/ Don't STOP!/ Why/VPL
2005年
2005/6/01	ageha	w-inds.	Pony Canyon	夢の場所へ
2005/11/30	Winter/Reflections	Boyz II Men	BBMC	
2005/11/09	デイドリーム	ムジカラグー	SUPER NOVA.LTD.	SUNDAY
2006年
2006/8/02	Keep YA Style	YA-KYIM	Victor Entertainment	Like I do
2007年
2007/3/07	Can YA Feel ?	YA-KYIM	Victor Entertainment	Feel The Sky / Holiday
2007/3/07	Diamond Princess	加藤ミリヤ	Sony Music Entertainment	Diamond
2007/9/22	Spontaneous	Spontania	Far Eastern Tribe Records	Miss Uを除く全楽曲
2007/10/10	太陽の子供	WISE	UNIVERSAL SIGMA	ALIVE / Can't stop feat. SPEECH
2007/10/10	ティンバランド・プレゼンツ・ショックヴァリュー～続編	Timbaland feat. Wise	Universal International	The Way I Are
2007/12/05	アイのうた	V.A.	Universal International	"HANABI"
2007/12/19	COLORS OF LIFE	光永亮太	PONYCANYON	Believe in Love
2008年
2008/1/01	w-inds. Single Collection"BEST ELEVEN"	w-inds.	PONYCANYON	夢の場所へ
2008/4/02	TOKYO STAR	加藤ミリヤ	Sony Music Entertainment	TOUGH /Tokyo Star
2008/5/28	RYU FMプレゼンツ ラヴ・ラップmixed by DJ MASAKO	V.A.	USM Japan	
2008/7/09	MAX OUT	Micro	Far Eastern Tribe Records	4 Seasons
2008/7/09	ナツウタ	V.A.	USM Japan	"HANABI"
2008/8/06	Color Change!	Crystal Kay	Epic Records Japan Inc.	History
2008/9/27	KI-SE-KI~cover hits 2008~	C.J.ルイス	Universal International	君のすべてに
2008/10/01	MUSIC	Spontania	Far Eastern Tribe Records	MUSIC/FIESTA/君のすべてに/M/「サヨナラ・・・」
2008/10/29	DJ KAORI'S JMIXII	V.A.	UNIVERSAL SIGMA	君のすべてに
2008/11/12	感情エフェクト	ONE OK ROCK	A-Sketch	My sweet baby
2008/11/12	プリズナー オリジナル・サウンドトラック	WISE	UNIVERSAL SIGMA	Unchain my heart
2008/11/26	アイのうた2	V.A.	Universal Music	君のすべてに
2008/12/03	アイのうた オルゴール	V.A.	USM Japan	君のすべてに
2008/12/10	オルガンCLUB	V.A.	CCRE	B♭FUNK -Jeff Miyahara REMIX-
2009年
2009/1/14	ダンス・ラヴァーズ・ダンス-ワールド・ラガ・ヒッツ	V.A.	SMJ	素直になれたら
2009/1/26	モバうた	V.A.	Universal J	君のすべてに
2009/2/04	WHITE~Lovers on canvas~	COLOR	Avex Entertainment	Can We Fall In Love
2009/3/04	What's Love?	JUJU	Sony Music Associated Records	What's Love? / 素直になれたら
2009/3/11	ワッツ・アップ? J	V.A.	USM Japan	君のすべてに
2009/3/25	TRANS//LATION	ベントレー・ジョーンズ	EMI MUSIC JAPAN	素直になれたら
2009/4/08	hellcat	黒木メイサ	SE(SME)	Lost / SEX / Criminal
2009/5/06	SPACE RHYTHM 1	Micro	Far Eastern Tribe Records	Iz This Love?
2009/5/27	DREAM	伊藤由奈	SMR	今でも会いたいよ / Body
2009/6/03	LOVE QUEST	WISE	UNIVERSAL SIGMA	Can't Stop feat. SPEECH / Unchain my heart feat. May J
2009/6/24	LOVE one.	西野カナ	Sony MUSIC	candy / 君に会いたくなるから
2009/7/29	Hello-Goodbye	Coming Century	Avex Entertainment	Hello-Goodbye
2009/8/19	HAPPY! ENJOY! FRESH!	YA-KYIM	Warner Music Japan	To・mo・da・chi / Afro Samurai
2009/9/09	Emotions	青山テルマ	Universal J	Intro / Cinderella Story
2009/10/28	City Of My Heart	Lil'Eddie	Manhattan Records	Searchin' For Love
2009/10/28	Musication	JAY'ED	Toys Factory	ずっと一緒 / CRY FOR YOU
2009/11/18	コラボレーションズBEST	Spontania	Far Eastern Tribe Records	Be With Me feat. SEAMO/同じ空みつめてるあなたにfeat. AZU/君のすべてにfeat. JUJU/今でもずっとfeat.伊藤由奈/Interlude/ Another Story ~「Story」Spontania Version~ /Beep Beep feat. WISE/きっとfeat.橋本聖子/Beautiful feat.ハリセンボン
2009/12/09	I AM	傳田真央	Universal J	Bitter Sweet/泣きたくなるけど/My Style/耳もとにいるよ...~Ring the bells REPRISE~
2009/12/16	PAST < FUTURE	安室奈美恵	Avex Trax	Steal my Night
2010年
2010/2/17	for you	May J.	rhythm zone	Be mine~君が好きだよ~
2010/2/24	STEP	玉置成実	Universal J	思い出になるの？
2010/3/17	JUJU	JUJU	Sony Music Associated Records	明日がくるなら/READY FOR LOVE
2010/3/17	Two of Us	AZU	Ariola Japan	あなたに愛たくて
2010/3/24	LOVE BEATS	Jeff Miyahara Vol.1	Far Eastern Tribe Records	全楽曲
2010/4/14	ベストロリー	キャプテンストライダム	SMA	東京ジャンボ☆ディスコ2010
2010/4/14	IT'S TAJ JACKSON	TAJ JACKSON	LEXINGTON	GET TO KNOW YOU
2010/6/23	to LOVE	西野カナ	Sony MUSIC	Summer Girl feat. MINMI
2010/7/21	GOLD	JASMINE	Sony Music Associated Records	sad to say/L.I.P.S/Jealous/dear my friend/This Is Not A Game/No More/Dreamin'
2010/7/28	HEAVEN	加藤ミリヤ	Sony Music Entertainment	Destiny
2010/7/28	LOVE!2	青山テルテ	Universal J	はなさないでよ
2010/8/25	LOVE HOUSE Best Mix For Beautiful Party Prople	V.A.	EMI MUSIC JAPAN	Sunaoninaretara
2010/9/22	Angelic Elegance	V.A.	ARTIMAGE RECORDS	Be mine~君が好きだよ~ May J./ずっと一緒 JAY'ED
2010/9/29	ii	RSP	Sony Music Records	旅立つキミへ
2010/10/20	恋愛中毒	傳田真央	UNIVERSAL J	一番好きな人
2010/12/01	The Last Ai	Ai	UNIVERSAL SIGMA	Incomplete feat Boyz II Men
2010/12/08	LOVE ~Singles Best 2005-2010~	伊藤由奈	SMR	今でも 会いたいよ・・・
2010/12/15	スポンテニア	スポンテニア	Far Eastern Tribe Records	TELL ME
2010/12/15	DJ KAORI'S JMIX IV	DJ KAORI	UNIVERSAL SIGMA	黒木メイサ FIVE / スポンテニア JAM / JASMINE sad to say / 沙羅マリー Mirror Mirror feat. COMA-CHI
2010/12/15	DIAMOND	4Minute	Far Eastern Tribe Records	Can't make up my mind
2010/12/22	FROM BROOKLYN TO YOU	QNIQUE	LEXINGTON	Wherever You Are feat. Charice
2011年
2011/01/26	MAGAZINE	黒木メイサ	gr8! records	FIVE, Wasted, SHOCK-運命-, CELEBRATE, BYE BYE MY FRIEND
2011/02/16	LOVE STORY	DEEP	rhythm zone	Promise
2011/03/16	Natural Beauty	ビビアン・スー	Far Eastan Tribe Records	タイミング~Timing~, NAICE AND NAUGHTY
2011/05/11	Heart Connection	WISE	UNIVERSAL J	By your side feat.西野カナ, I loved you feat.HIROKO
2011/05/18	Already Yours	LIL EDDIE	LEXINGTON	Tll the end of the world
2011/06/22	w-inds. 10th Anniversary Best Album	w-inds.	Pony Canyon	夢の場所へ
2011/07/13	YOU	JUJU	Sony Music Associated Records	さよならの代わりに / Love again
2011/08/03	M BEST	加藤ミリヤ	Sony Music Entertainment	Destiny
2011/08/03	Manhattan Records The Exclusives Japanese R&B Hits	V.A. (Mixed By Dj Hasebe)	Manhattan Recordings	LOVE SHINES
2011/09/07	LOVERS ～ Tiara Collaborations Album ～	Tiara	CROWN RECORDS	時をとめて feat. WISE / ありがとう。愛してた人 feat. Spontania
2011/10/12	TWENTY	BOYZ II MEN	rhythm zone	End Of The Day
2011/11/16	Your Voice	JAY'ED	TOY'S FACTORY	君の手を〜Don't say GoodBye〜
2012年
2012/01/18	NOCTURNAL	AZIATIX	Manhattan Recordings	Nothing comperes to you
2012/02/15	UNLOCKED	黒木メイサ	gr8! records	Hit the Road
2012/02/29	ISM	ISSA×SoulJa	SONIC GROOVE	i hate you / ISSA×SoulJa+ROLA, FOREVA/ ISSA×SoulJa+Maiko Nakamura, P.A.I.O, 4 chords, Breathe, i love you / ISSA×SoulJa+Yui Minemura+Anna Fujita
2012/07/04	BELIEVE	Che'Nelle	EMI Music Japan	Fall in Love, Rain
2012/07/25	山下智久	ERO	ワーナーミュージック・ジャパン	Shiver, Hit The Wall
2012/8/8	GIFT of SMAP	香取慎吾	ビクターエンターテイメント	MONSTERS
2012/09/05	Love Place	西野カナ	Sony Music Entertainment	SAKURA, I love you?
2012/09/05	MENZ Collection	傳田真央	Nippon Crown	RESET with SEAMO
2012/11/07	BEST STORY ~Life stories~	JUJU	SMAR	明日がくるなら
2012/11/07	BEST STORY ~Love stories~	JUJU	SMAR	素直になれたら, READY FOR LOVE, さよならの代わりに
2012/11/28	GIRLS' GENERATION	~Girls & Peace~	NAYUTAWAVE RECORDS	(creative supervisor)
2012/12/19	Midnight Theatre	ROMEO	ビクターエンターテイメント	全収録曲
2013年
2013/01/01	MIRACLE	三代目 J Soul Brothers	rhythm zone	Kiss You Tonight, Dynamite
2013/02/13	セミダブル	傳田真央	Nippon Crown	いまさら会えなくて, Next Love
2013/04/03	FATE(s)	GUMMY	YGEX	全収録
2013/06/05	Heart Song	クリス・ハート	UNIVERSAL SIGMA	全収録
2013/06/26	Boys Meet U	SHINee	EMIミュージックジャパン	Password, Breaking News
2013/07/03	WEATHER GIRLS	Weather Girls	Pony Canyon	Full-length album
2013/07/24	It's me?? ~shadow~	石川マリー	rhythm zone	Cry & Try
2013/08/07	アイシテル	Che'Nelle	UNIVERSAL INTERNATIONAL	アイ・ウィル,バーニング・ラブ
2013/08/21	Best Album	VANNESS	Pony Canyon	360
2013/08/28	FANTASTIC GIRLS	KARA	UNIVERSAL SIGMA	プロミス
2013/08/28	Complexxx	JASMINE	Sony Music Associated Records	Best Partner, Addiction, Touch me on the Beach, B*TCH*S
2013/09/04	Heart Song-Special Edition-	クリス・ハート	UNIVERSAL SIGMA	全収録
2013/09/04	Love Collection ~pink~	西野カナ	Sony Music Entertainment	君に会いたくなるから, SAKURA, I love you?
2013/09/11	A NUDE	山下智久	ワーナーミュージック・ジャパン	PAri-PArA
2013/11/13	GENERATIONS	GENERATIONS from EXILE TRIBE	rhythm zone	to the STAGE
2013/11/20	The Entertainer	三浦大知	SONIC GROOVE	Two Hearts
2013/12/04	ベスト・ソングス	Che'Nelle	UNIVERSAL INTERNATIONAL	バーニング・ラブ
2013/12/11	LOVE&PEACE	GIRLS' GENERATION	NAYUTAWAVE RECORDS	(Creative Supervisor)
2014年
2014/01/01	THE BEST/BLUE IMPACT	三代目 J Soul Brothers	rhythm zone	Higher
2014/01/22	Cross The Border	J-Min	NAYUTAWAVE RECORDS	(Creative Supervisor)
2014/01/22	Flower	Flower	SMAR	YOUR GRAVITY
2014/02/05	THE II AGE	THE SECOND from EXILE	rhythm zone	Signal Fire feat. SWAY
2014/03/19	Song for You	クリス・ハート	UNIVERSAL SIGMA	全楽曲収録
2014/03/26	HOTEL HEART COLLECTOR	JAY'ED	UNIVERSAL J	Check In,ともに, Check Out
2014/06/25	Heart Song II	クリス・ハート	UNIVERSAL SIGMA	全楽曲収録
2014/07/09	Timeless	w-inds.	ポニーキャニオン	Good time, Dream You Back
2014/07/23	THE BEST	GIRLS' GENERATION	NAYUTAWAVE RECORDS	(Creative Supervisor)
2014/09/02	WHO'S BACK?	BoA	Avex Trax	(Creative Supervisor)
2014/09/24	I'm Your Boy	SHINee	EMIミュージックジャパン	(Creative Supervisor)
2014/10/08	YOU	山下智久	ワーナーミュージック・ジャパン	YOUR STEP, Love&Hug
2014/10/22	LIV	AKANE LIV	ビクターエンターテイメント	Sunrise Over Sea, NIGHT PARADE, Raindrop, Close Your Eyes, Interlude, Summer Shadow, Libertango
2014/10/29	ホワイトギフト	TWINCROSS	トイズファクトリー	ただいま,誰かのサンタクロース
2014/11/11	ALIVE	ROMEO	Park Jungmin inc.	全収録
2014/11/12	Christmas Hearts	クリス・ハート	UNIVERSAL SIGMA	全楽曲収録
2014/12/10	Luna	塩ノ谷早耶香	キングレコード	Like a flower, to you,プレゼント
2015年
2015/2/11	シェネル・ワールド	Che'Nelle	Virgin Music	Forever Friends
2015/6/03	Heart Song III	クリス・ハート	UNIVERSAL SIGMA	全楽曲収録
2015/6/03	Last Note I~IV	ROMEO	Park Jungmin inc.	全収録
2015/11/04	First Kiss	MACO	UNIVERSAL J	君の背中に
2015/11/04	Christmas Hearts ～winter gift～	クリス・ハート	UNIVERSAL SIGMA	全収録
2015/11/18	Secret Collection ~GREEN~(初回生産限定盤)	西野カナ	Sony Music Entertainment	Candy
2015/11/25	Run away (Mini Album)	ROMEO	Park Jungmin inc.	全収録
2015/11/25	FAITH (Mini Album)	ROMEO	Park Jungmin inc.	全収録
2015/11/25	In The Forest (Mini Album)	ROMEO	Park Jungmin inc.	全収録
2015/12/29	DxDxD	SHINee	EMIミュージックジャパン	(Creative Supervisor)
2016年
2016/01/06	FIXER	中森明菜	UNIVERSAL MUSIC	欲動
2016/01/06	EVERY SEASON	Da-iCE	UNIVERSAL MUSIC	Cynical Life
2016/01/27	YAMA-P	山下智久	ワーナーミュージック・ジャパン	YOUR STEP
2016/03/02	SPEEDSTER	GENERATIONS from EXILE TRIBE	rhythm zone	to the STAGE
2016/06/15	Song for You II	クリス・ハート	UNIVERSAL SIGMA	全楽曲収録
2016/06/15	HIGH & LOW ORIGINAL BEST ALBUM	V.A.	rhythm zone	三代目 J Soul Brothers from EXILE TRIBE / MUGEN ROAD
2016/06/22	I Scream	Kis My Ft2	avex trax	Summer Breeze
2016/10/31	Heart Song Tears	クリス・ハート	UNIVERSAL SIGMA	全楽曲収録
2016/11/30	GO EAST / Go WEST	Nicholas Edwards	Pony Canyon	全楽曲収録
2016/12/07	Dangerman	SE7EN	Victor Entertainment	Dangerman, Feel The Fire
2016/12/21	SMAP 25 YEARS	SMAP	ビクターエンターテイメント	Battery, シャレオツ
2017年
2017/01/27	FIVE	SHINee	EMIミュージックジャパン	(Creative Supervisor)
2017/03/29	The JSB World	三代目 J Soul Brothers from EXILE TRIBE	rhythm zone	Kiss You Tonight, Higher, MUGEN ROAD
2017/05/24	Mr.Holic	HOWL BE QUIET	ポニーキャニオン	全楽曲収録
2017/05/24	GIRLS	EXO-CBX	avex trax	(Music Creative Supervisor)
2017/07/18	Flame Of Love	TAEMIN	Universal Music	(Music Creative Director)
2017/09/29	Final Life	TAEMIN/TAEYEON/EXO-CBX	Universal Music	(Music Creative Director)
2017/10/03	こころのうた〜クリス•ハート ベスト	クリスハート Chris Hart	Universal Music	(Music Producer)
2017/12/13	舞祭組の、わっ！	舞祭組	avex trax	(Composer Fire & Lightning)
2018年
2018/01/31	COUNTDOWN	EXO	avex trax	(Music Creative Director)
2018/07/25	Loop	Anly	Sony Music	(Composer & Music Producer)
2019年
2019/05/02	Hologram	KEY	Universal Music	(Music Creative Director)
2019/05/13	FRNKSTN	PRIZMAX	Stardust Records	(Composer & Music Producer)
2019/07/27	歌袋	横山だいすけ	Sony Music	(Composer & Music Producer) Hands
2019/07/27	IV	青柳翔	Sony Music	(Composer & Music Producer) Unknown
2019/11/25	JASMINE 2.0	JASMINE	Sony Music	(Composer & Music Producer)
2020年
2020/01/01	20200101	香取慎吾う	Warner Music	(Vocal Producer) Neo
2020/02/27	YOUR STORY	JUJU	Sony Music	(Composer & Vocal Producer) 明日がくるなら / Ready For Love
2020/09/10	MuuSee	咲姫みゆ	Universal Music	(Composer & Music Producer) True To You
2020/11/24	einsatZ	ZOOL	Lantis	(Composer & Music Producer) Game
2020/12/04	Burn It Black e.p.	SUPER★DRAGON	Stardust Records	(Music Producer)
2021年
2021/03/11	ロード第5章 x2	高橋ジョージ	Tokuma Japan	(Music Producer)
2021/03/31	BAEKHYUN	BAEKHYUN	Avex Entertainment	(Music Creative Director)
2021/04/20	Full Colors	OLDCODEX	Lantis Records	(Music Producer)
2021/08/27	ACTION!	KEYTALK	Universal Music	(Music Producer)
2021/09/14	Imaginary	MIYAVI	Universal Music	(Composer & Music Producer)

=== DVDs ===
Released	DVD	Artist	Label	Title
2005/7/20	WORKS vol.4	w-inds.	Pony Canyon	夢の場所へ
2005/12/14	w-inds. Live Tour 2005 "ageha"	w-inds.	Pony Canyon	夢の場所へ
2007/12/12	Diamond Princess Tour 2007	加藤ミリヤ	Sony Music Records	Diamond
2007/12/19	Micro presents Laid Back LIVE!!	Micro	Far EasternTribe Records	
2008/12/10	TOKYO STAR Tour 2008	加藤ミリヤ	Sony Music Entertainment	TOUGH /Tokyo Star
2009/3/4	WORKS BEST	w-inds.	Pony Canyon	夢の場所へ
2010/5/26	Ring Tour 2009	加藤ミリヤ	Sony Music Entertainment	LOVE, POWER&SOUL
