= The, Park Jung Min =

- The, Park Jung Min cover

EP by Park Jung-min
- Released: April 1, 2011
- Recorded: 2011 in Seoul, South Korea
- Genre: K-pop, dance
- Length: 26:31
- Language: Korean
- Label: CNr Media; LOEN Entertainment (Korea); Warner Music Japan (Japan); Sony Music (Taiwan)

Singles from The, Park Jung Min
- 1. "Not Alone" Released: January 20, 2011

Music video
- "Like Tears Are Falling" on YouTube

The, Park Jung Min (stylized as THE, PARK JUNG MIN) is the first Korean mini album of Park Jung-min of South Korean boy band SS501. It was released on 1 April 2011. A limited edition of the album, Wara Wara The, Park Jung Min, was released in Japan on 25 May 2011.

The album contains five tracks including his debut single "Not Alone" plus two instrumentals and a 40-page photobook.

== Track listing ==
CD
No.	Title	Lyrics	Music	Arrangement	Length
1.	"눈물이 흐를 만큼 (Like Tears Are Falling)"	Choi Kab-won	Kim Jin-hoon, Choi Kab-won	Kim Jin-hoon	4:14
2.	"가라 가라 (Go Go)"	Choi Kab-won	PJ, Kim Do-hoon	PJ	3:28
3.	"Not Alone"	Park Jung-min	Shinsadong Tiger	Shinsadong Tiger	3:53
4.	"넌 알고 있니 (Do You Know?)"	Park Jung-min	Shinsadong Tiger	Shinsadong Tiger	3:43
5.	"내 하루는 매일매일 크리스마스 (Every Day Is Christmas)"	Park Jung-min, Kang Hyun-min	Kang Hyun-min	Kang Hyun-min	3:24
6.	"눈물이 흐를 만큼 (Like Tears Are Falling)" (Instrumental)		Kim Jin-hoon, Choi Kab-won	Kim Jin-hoon	4:14
7.	"가라 가라 (Go Go)" (Instrumental)		PJ, Kim Do-hoon	PJ	3:28
Total length:					26:31

Wara Wara The, Park Jung Min (Japanese limited edition)
No.	Title	Lyrics	Music	Arrangement	Length
1.	"涙、流れるほど (Like Tears Are Falling)" (Japanese version)	Choi Kab-won	Kim Jin-hoon, Choi Kab-won	Kim Jin-hoon	04:14
2.	"Wara Wara" (Japanese version)	Choi Kab-won	PJ, Kim Do-hoon	PJ	03:28
3.	"Not Alone" (Japanese version)	Park Jung-min	Shinsadong Tiger	Shinsadong Tiger	03:53
4.	"君は知ってる？～届かないメッセージ～ (Do You Know?)" (Japanese version)	Park Jung-min	Shinsadong Tiger	Shinsadong Tiger	03:43
5.	"毎日クリスマス (Everyday Is Christmas)" (Japanese version)	Park Jung-min, Kang Hyun-min	Kang Hyun-min	Kang Hyun-min	03:24
6.	"涙、流れるほど (Like Tears Are Falling)" (Instrumental)		Kim Jin-hoon, Choi Kab-won	Kim Jin-hoon	04:14
7.	"Wara Wara" (Instrumental)		PJ, Kim Do-hoon	PJ	03:28
8.	"Not Alone" (Instrumental)		Shinsadong Tiger	Shinsadong Tiger	03:54
9.	"君は知ってる？～届かないメッセージ～ (Do You Know?)" (Instrumental)		Shinsadong Tiger	Shinsadong Tiger	03:43
10.	"毎日クリスマス (Everyday Is Christmas)" (Instrumental)		Kang Hyun-min	Kang Hyun-min	03:22

== Music videos ==
- "Like Tears Are Falling"

== Release history ==
Country	Date	Format	Distributing label
South Korea	1 April 2011	CD, digital download	LOEN Entertainment
Worldwide	1 April 2011	digital download	LOEN Entertainment
Japan	16 April 2011	CD	LOEN Entertainment
Japan	24 May 2011	CD	Warner Music Japan (Japan Version)
Taiwan	19 April 2011	CD	Sony Music (Taiwan Edition)

== Charts ==
Album	Peak position					
Album	Gaon Weekly Album Chart	Gaon Monthly Album Chart	Five Music J-Pop/K-Pop Chart	G-Music J-Pop/K-Pop Chart	G-music Combo Chart	ORICON Albums Chart
The, Park Jung Min	4	11	4 (Imported version); 3 (Taiwan version)	8	2	34

=== Sales and certifications ===
Chart	Physical sales in April 2011
Gaon	9,477+
