= Park Jung-min (singer) =

South Korean singer (born 1987)

Park Jung-Min
- 박정민
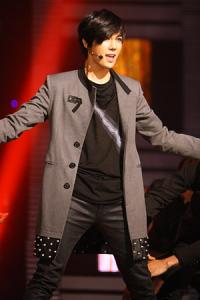
- Park in 2011
- Born: April 3, 1987 (age 39); Seoul, South Korea
- Other names: ROMEO ; Japanese: パク・ジョンミン
- Occupations: Singer; dancer; DJ; MC; actor; model
- Musical career
- Genres: K-pop; J-pop; Dance; R&B
- Years active: 2005–present
- Labels: DSP Media; CNr Media; Sony Music Taiwan; Colourful Records; Victor Entertainment; Yamaha A & R; L&JIHO Entertainment; SKY CORPORATION; Park Jungmin Inc.; Imagine Asia
- Member of: SS501
- Website: parkjungmin.co.kr

- Korean name
- Hangul: 박정민
- Hanja: 朴政珉
- RR: Bak Jeongmin
- MR: Pak Chŏngmin

Park Jung-Min (Korean: 박정민; Hanja: 朴政珉; born: April 3, 1987) is a South Korean singer, entertainer, actor, and a member of boyband SS501. In 2009, Park made his musical debut in Grease as Danny Park, where he received the Best New Musical Talent award by the Golden Ticket Awards. He also had his acting debut as a main lead in Human Theater 2010. In 2010, Park opened his own online shopping mall called Royal Avenue, with him as the CEO. ONstyle Magazine created a documentary about the shopping center named What Women Want. With the expiration of the contract, Park left DSP Media, who managed him as part of SS501 and joined CNr Media as a solo artist. He made his debut as a soloist in January 2011 with single Not Alone, and had his first Japanese drama entitled Love Song In August in 2011. However, Park joined Yamaha A&R's Victor Entertainment eventually after successfully terminating his contract with CNr Media in 2012. Park speaks Korean, Japanese, and Chinese fluently. On July 2, 2015, he started his two years of military duties as a public service worker and returned on July 1, 2017.

== Biography ==
=== Early life ===
Park Jung-min was born on April 3, 1987, in Seoul, South Korea. His family consists of his parents and two siblings: one brother and one sister, neither of whom work in the entertainment industry.

He studied in the Department of Multi-media Images, major in Acting at the Kyonggi University, where he was the student council president with fellow SS501 member Kim Hyung Jun. However, because of Kim Hyung Jun's constant absence from school due to his training with DSP Media, which later became their agency, Jung Min said that he had never met Kim before SS501 was formed.

=== Pre-debut ===
Before his debut, Park was once a commercial model for condoms. When he was 13 years old, he was scouted by an agency and was accepted by both DSP Media and S.M. Entertainment. At that time, S.M. Entertainment told him that they were preparing a new group, but that the group consisted of many members, which according to Park was probably Super Junior since he saw them rehearsing too. Park eventually chose DSP Media because he believed that he would debut faster through DSP.

=== 2005-2009: SS501 debut ===
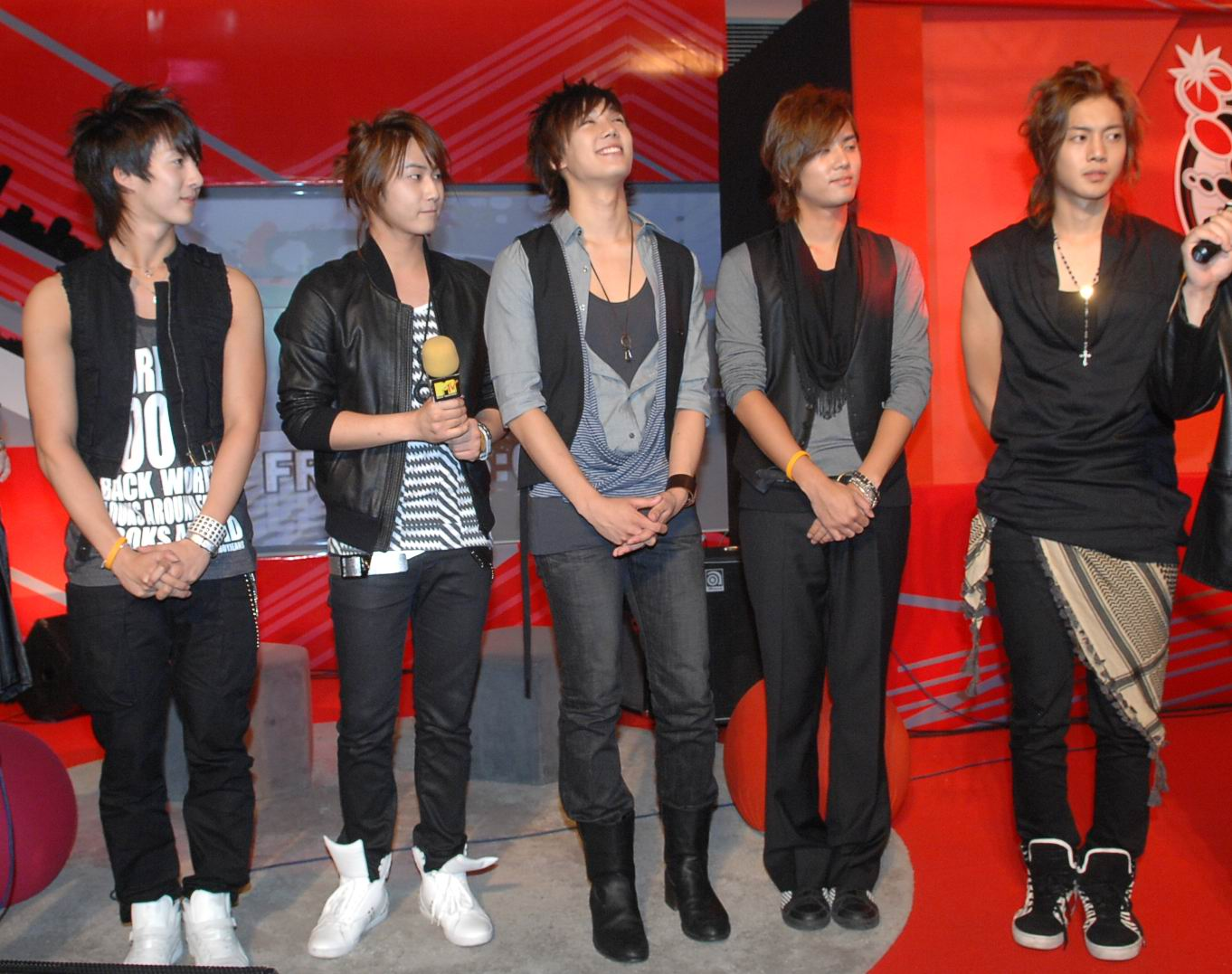
SS501 at My Style My MTV on stage (2008)

Park Jung Min debuted as a member of SS501 on June 8, 2005, along with their debut album entitled Warning. Their second mini album, Snow Prince was released in late 2005, five months after their debut. During this time, they also established their official fan club name, "Triple S", and its fan club color, pearl green. The group earned popularity right away as they won many rookie awards after their debut.

In 2006, Jung Min hosted radio program SS501's Youngstreet on Seoul Broadcasting System (SBS) with fellow SS501 member, Heo Young Saeng beginning on May 1, 2006. He, then, continued to host with Kim Kyu Jong, co-SS501 member, when Heo left the program on August 21 due to a throat condition requiring laryngeal surgery. The SS501 members, except for Heo Young Saeng who was recovering from surgery, also lent their voices to the Korean version of 2006 animated film Pi's Story.

SS501 soon promoted their first studio album, which was released on November 10 entitled S.T 01 Now. In late 2007, they expanded their activities in the Japanese market to challenge themselves outside Korea with the release of their Japanese single Kokoro, along with the establishment of "Triple S Japan". After the single debuted at number five, they had two more successful releases in Japan entitled Distance and SS501. In around one year in Japan, they received the Newcomer Award by Japan Gold Disc Award in January 2008; this was the first time for Korean artists to receive this award.

Having built their foundation as artists in both countries, they continually released singles and albums back-and-forth such as Deja Vu in Korea and Lucky Days in Japan, both released in 2008.

In 2008, he made his musical debut in Grease, playing the lead role, 'Danny Park', that the group had to stop their group activities for a short period of time. In 2009-2010, SS501 released All My Love, Solo Collection, Rebirth, and Destination consecutively before their contracts ended. In the meantime, he starred in his first acting career as a main lead entitled Human Theater 2010, playing himself as the main character in 2010.

=== 2010–2011: Leaving DSP Media and solo artist ===
In June 2010, upon the expiration of Park Jung Min's contract with DSP Media, he signed with CNr Media on August 10, 2010, a company jointly set up by Taiwanese producer Comic-Ritz and Korean Roy Media, to embark on his solo career. CNr Media stated that SS501's activities are top priority in his contract and that they have not disbanded. He also signed with Sony Music Asia for his Asia activities after finalizing his contract on September 30, and Yamaha Music Entertainment for his Japan activities which is revealed on September 17. During this time, Park Jung Min and Kim Hyung Jun also attended the 21st Golden Melody Awards in Taiwan to present an award together with Ken Chu.

Park Jung Min was the first one to release a solo album, with his debut solo single, Not Alone, on January 20, 2011. His albums are distributed in Taiwan by Sony Music Taiwan. and he even visited Taiwan and Singapore to promote it.

In July 2011, he has been cast as the lead in Japanese mobile drama LISMO August's Love Song. He also contributed to KBS2's The Princess' Man OST in August, where he sang "Missing You" composed by Park Jung Wook.

=== 2012: Fondant Garden, lawsuit against CNr Media and Beautiful album ===
In February 2012, Park starred alongside Jian Man Shu, Kingone Wang and Lia Lee, in a Taiwanese drama named Fondant Garden, playing the lead role of Park Hee Hwan.

Between April 2 and 7, Park participated in Dominic's Way fashion show during the 2012 Seoul Fashion Week, for designer Song Hye-myung, who designed SS501's clothes for their Destination mini album jacket. He was dressed as vdette in a dark angel attire with spreading wings. Four days later, on April 12, Park filed an injunction at Seoul Central District Court against his agency CNr Media to cancel his exclusive representation contract, citing improper distribution of profits. A source close to Park said:

The exclusive contract with CNr Media stated that the profits would be divided 8-to-2 for those coming from Korea and 5-to-5 for those coming from overseas, but the profits were never distributed except for the ₩150 million given since last year.

According to another media source, Park departed from CNr Media in March 2012 but continued with his schedule in Japan on April 14 despite the injunction.

The decision of the court came on July 30, favoring Park Jung Min's case against CNR Media. With this decision, he is now free to promote in Korea and overseas regardless of his contract with CNR Media until the judgment on merits is issued, especially that if the contract was continued, Park Jung Min's career might be in danger. However, despite the lawsuit, he still continued to uphold his promise with his fans, attending all schedules set by CNR Media including promotions for the Taiwanese drama Fondant Garden. On October 10, his new agency, Yamaha A&R, announced that Park filled a two hundred million won lawsuit against his former agency, seeking compensation. Finally on May 22, the legal battle between Park and his former agency, CNr Media, has finally come to an end. It was said through a press release on May 28 that Park agreed to receive an amount that could be paid by his former agency since CNr Media is in poor financial status recently.

Park Jung Min's attorney said:

We weren't aiming for the money in the compensation case. We just wanted to clear up all ties with the former agency. We reached an agreement so that all legal ties would be cleared, letting Park Jung Min concentrate on his current activities.

After the lawsuit, Park Jung Min debuted in Japan using the name 'Romeo' under Victor Music. He released two albums, named Give Me Your Heart and Tonight's The Night in September and October respectively. Afterwards, he returned to Korea to continue his music career as 'Park Jung Min' and released his first self-produced single album entitled Beautiful. At the end of the year, he released a full length Japanese album Midnight Theatre back as Romeo. During his 'Face Off Concert' at the Tokyo Dome City Hall, however, he performed as both 'Park Jung Min' and 'Romeo'.

=== 2013–present: International tours ===
Park Jung Min attended and performed at the 2013 StarHub TVB Golden Viva Spectacular together with other K-Pop artists on February 9, that was initially filmed during the January 31 at the Seoul Student Jamsil Gymnasium. The performances were broadcast simultaneously in Korea, Singapore, and Hong Kong to celebrate the Lunar New Year with their Hong Kong fans.

On February 14, he held a press conference at the Sony Music Square in Tokyo about his upcoming concert tour. He had eight performances in total, starting on March 19 in Fukoka, March 21 in Osaka, March 22 in Tokyo, and March 23 in Nagoya. His shows had a different concept, though: light/dark; good/bad concept. In particular, he performed by the name 'Park Jung Min' during the day, then changing his persona to 'Romeo' when the night comes.

During SS501's eight anniversary, Park, along with the SS501 members posted one video of them celebrating and greeting their fans onto each of their own official YouTube accounts. Kim Hyun Joong was not able to be in the video at that time because he had a shooting on his variety show, Barefooted Friends. However, Kim Hyun Joong still talked about their anniversary on his Korea fanmeeting entitled 2013 KHJ Show - Party People, held at the same day of their anniversary.

Park had his first fanmeeting tour in South and Latin America together with co-member Heo Young-saeng starting on August 17. Although it is said to be a joint fanmeeting tour, which was put by Zafiro Productions, the two of them would not have the same time and meetings with their fans. The tour consisted of three stops: two in Peru, and one in Mexico. Fanmeetings in Lima, Peru on August 17 and Mexico on August 20 were held as originally planned, and an encore in Lima, Peru on August 24 was added later on.

Park attended Heo Young-saeng's first and farewell concert in Seoul entitled 2013 Heo Young Saeng Seoul Concert 0513 My Story on October 26 at the UNIQLO AX Hall. This time, all of the SS501 members appeared together on one stage and performed together as one group again after three years. They sang their self-written song dedicated to their fans, "Green Peas", and their a cappella version of the song, "In the Still of the Night".

On December 14, DSP Media had its first festival held at Seoul Jamsil Indoor Gymnasium in celebration of DSP Media's 22nd anniversary. Together with the company's artists, Park and Eun Ji-won of Sechs Kies joined and performed in the festival.

In the beginning of 2014, Park had his first European Tour, Park Jung Min Reverso Tour. He made stops in Paris, Germany, and Russia starting on January 29. His first stop was Dortmund at FZW on January 31. The next day, he headed to Paris at the Le Divan du Monde before wrapping things up in Moscow on February 3 at the Concert Hall. In all of his shows, he had shared the stage with his opening act, Choi Soo Min, a boxer-turned-pianist who has received critical acclaim for his dynamic style of music. He became the first ever Korean singer to perform in the country of Russia, as well as the first solo artist to perform in Dortmund city.

On May 12, 2014, he released his third Japanese single album Save Us Tonight under his real name, Park Jung-min. It also offers a Korean version of the single album. On July 2, 2015, he entered the army through the Nonsan Army Training Center. He is still serving as a public service worker. He is expected to be discharged in July 2017.

== Image and artistry ==
=== Public image ===
...I want people to know how I grew up those years, from IDOL Park Jung Min to ARTIST Park Jung Min. Of course; I know it might look like a role play, but the character I chose is part of the "real me". — Park Jung-min

Park Jung-min always tries to interact with his fans, one way or another. He interacted with his European audience, for instance, by asking them to teach him their language and used the words taught to talk to them.

His professionalism was shown during one of his concert tours in Germany wherein he stayed calm and composed despite having numerous technical problems. As stated by German-based "K-Colors of Korea' Magazine":

How grown and professional of an artist Park Jung Min is he got to show thanks to the mess the technicians made during the concert. Although the wrong background music or wrong video started and he got interrupted in his conversation with the fans by music that started too early, he never lost his charm and found back into the show as soon as he started singing. When he made it clear, still very politely, how the chaos with the technic annoyed him, he showed one more thing: As an artist he knows his worth exactly and he knows what he wants. This is one of his strong points, because knowing what you want leads to ending up where you belong. And Park Jung Min belongs to the top among the Korean artists of today.

=== Musical style, lyrics, and composition ===
Personally, I have no particular preference. The melody, lyrics, or what kind of message I want to convey and share; this is the most important thing. This is what I care about when I choose a music style. I wish people could become happy when they hear my songs. — Park Jung-min

During his SS501 days, Park Jung-min had already been composing songs, and contributing some of his creations to their albums. For example, he penned the song "Kiss", which was sung by Rainbow from their Gossip Girl album. The song was even performed by himself during SS501's Persona encore concert in Seoul. He also contributed to the lyrics of "Green Peas", which is a dedication to their fans. At the time that he went solo, he contributed to some songs from his debut album Not Alone, particularly its titular single. He also wrote the lyrics, which was in Japanese, his song "Your Colour" for LISMO channel's mobile drama Love Song In August.

Park Jung-min is not restricted, but continuously transforming his style: "...he reinvented himself, from boygroup member to solo singer; to artist." During his solo debut in Not Alone, for example, the music video includes a dark-themed music video instead of a typical K-pop one with fashionable, colorful outfits. When he transforms himself to Romeo in 2012, his personality also transforms into a completely different image: he shows an even darker, sexier image. On the other hand, his single album Save Us Tonight in 2014 has a bright, vibrant theme.

== Philanthropy ==
In April 2011, Park performed with Japanese duo Mihimaru GT at a UN Charity Concert in Yokohama, Japan to aid victims of the 2011 Tōhoku earthquake and tsunami. He volunteered and performed during the United Nations charity event: Friend's Whistle! Act For Tomorrow!. Along with the members of Choshinsei(Supernova), he also stood outside the event hall at Pacifica Yokohama to collect monetary donations. Moreover, he performed on April 28 to encourage people to donate.

Also in 2011, Park was one of the artists who donated their favorite hat to "쇼나조각 展" held in an open pavilion in Gyeongbokgung Subway Line 3 to collect donations and give them to underprivileged children. At the end of the year, he was reported to have ranked 4th in donating rice (1.2 tons of rice) in the "Salvation Army by the company Dreame". The centre is known for donating rice and sending them to local children's shelters as well as the national center for social welfare and undernourished children; benefiting young boys and girls as well as the elderly.

On May 31, 2012, Park performed in the "Music Echo Together of Love" charity concert at the Amsa Rehabilitation Center.

On May 29, 2015, Park again made an appearance & performed in "Echoes of Love" Charity Concert, also at the Amsa Rehabilitation Centre.

== Discography ==
=== Korean ===
Mini albums/singles

- 2011 :Not Alone
- 2011 :The, Park Jung Min
- 2012 :Beautiful
- 2013 : "Give Me Your Love"
- 2014: Summer Break!
- 2020 : Love So Sweet -with PIXY Ella-

=== Japanese ===
Studio albums

- 2012: Midnight Theatre

EPs/Singles

- 2011: Wara Wara The, Park Jung Min
- 2012: Give Me Your Heart
- 2012: Tonight's the Night
- 2014: Save Us Tonight
- 2014: Summer Break!
- 2014: Alive
- 2014: Winter Love
- 2014: Christmas Kiss
- 2015: 10th Anniversary -Memories-
- 2015: It's Summer Time...
- 2015: Last Note
- 2015: Run Away
- 2015: In the Forest
- 2015: FAITH
- 2016: Happiness
- 2017: TOXIC LOVE
- 2017: Fan Selection Best

== Filmography ==
=== Film ===
Year	Title	Hangul	Role
2006	Pi's Story	파이 스토리	Voice (Korea Version)
2015	Goodbye and Hello	굿바이 그리고 헬로우	Supporting role
2020	You and I	유앤아이	Main role

=== Television series ===
Year	Title	Original title	Role	Genre
2005	Nonstop 5	논스톱 5	Cameo Ep.207	Sitcom
2005	Can Love Be Refilled?	사랑도 리필이 되나요	Himself	Drama
2007	Hotelier	ホテリアー	Cameo Ep.7 (with SS501)	Japanese drama
2008	Elephant	코끼리	Himself Ep.85	Sitcom
2008	Spotlight	스포트라이트	Cameo (with SS501)	Drama
2010	Human Theater	인생극장	Himself Ep.1-6	Comedic Drama
2011	Pianissimo (DVD title: Super Star)	피아니시모	Detective Cha Min-seo (Ep. "Meet")	Mini drama
2011	Love Song In August	八月のラヴソング	Himself	Japanese drama
2012	Fondant Garden	翻糖花園	Park Hee-hwan/Pu Xi-huan/Han Ji	Taiwanese drama

=== Variety shows ===
Year	Title	Hangul	Episodes
2008	We Got Married (season 1)	우리 결혼했어요	Recurring Guest
2009	Golden Fishery	실화극장	
2009	Haptic Mission	핲틱 미션	
2010	What Women Want		
2011	Star Dance Battle		
2017	King of Masked Singer	미스터리 음악쇼 복면가왕	Contestant Ep. 133

=== Musical theater ===
Year	Title	Role	Notes
2008	Grease	Danny Park	Korean musical
2010	Bonds of Boys	Park Jung-sol	Japanese musical
2013	Summer Snow	Kan Jinha	Japanese musical
2014	If I	Park	Japanese original dance musical

=== Radio DJ ===
- May 1, 2006 - April 15, 2007: SBS Power FM - SS501's Young Street (Korean: SS501의 영스트리트)

== Awards and nominations ==
Year	Award	Category	Nominated work	Result
2009	Golden Ticket Awards	Best New Musical Talent	Grease	Won
2013	Korean Entertainment 10th Anniversary Awards in Japan	Best Korean Solo Artist	ROMEO	Nominated
