= Rainbow (South Korean group) =

South Korean girl group

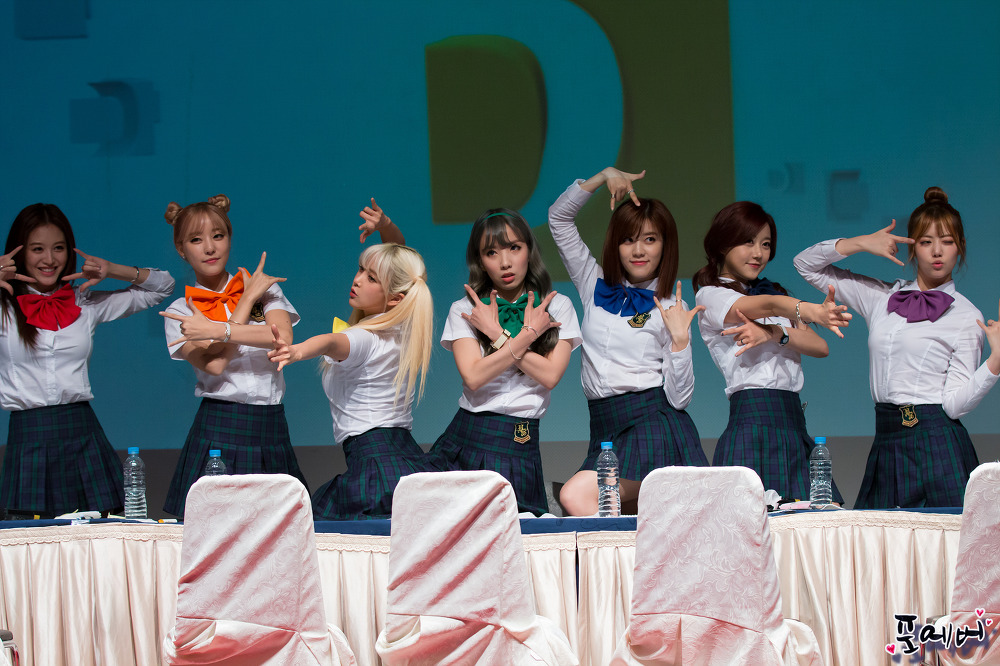
- Rainbow in 2016. From left to right: Jaekyung, Woori, Hyunyoung, Jisook, Noeul, Seungah and Yoonhye.

Background information
- Origin: Seoul, South Korea
- Genre: K-pop
- Years active: 2009–2016; 2019
- Labels: DSP; Universal Sigma
- Spinoffs: Rainbow Pixie; Rainbow Blaxx; Rainbow18
- Past members: Woori; Seungah; Jaekyung; Noeul; Yoonhye; Jisook; Hyunyoung

Rainbow (Korean: 레인보우) was a South Korean girl group formed in 2009 by DSP Media. The group was composed of seven members: Woori, Seungah, Jaekyung, Noeul, Yoonhye, Jisook and Hyunyoung. They debuted on November 12, 2009, with their first EP, Gossip Girl. The group went on to release two studio albums and four more extended plays before disbanding in 2016. They reunited in November 2019 for their tenth anniversary, releasing their sixth extended play.

== History ==
=== 2009–2010: Formation, debut and rise in prominence ===
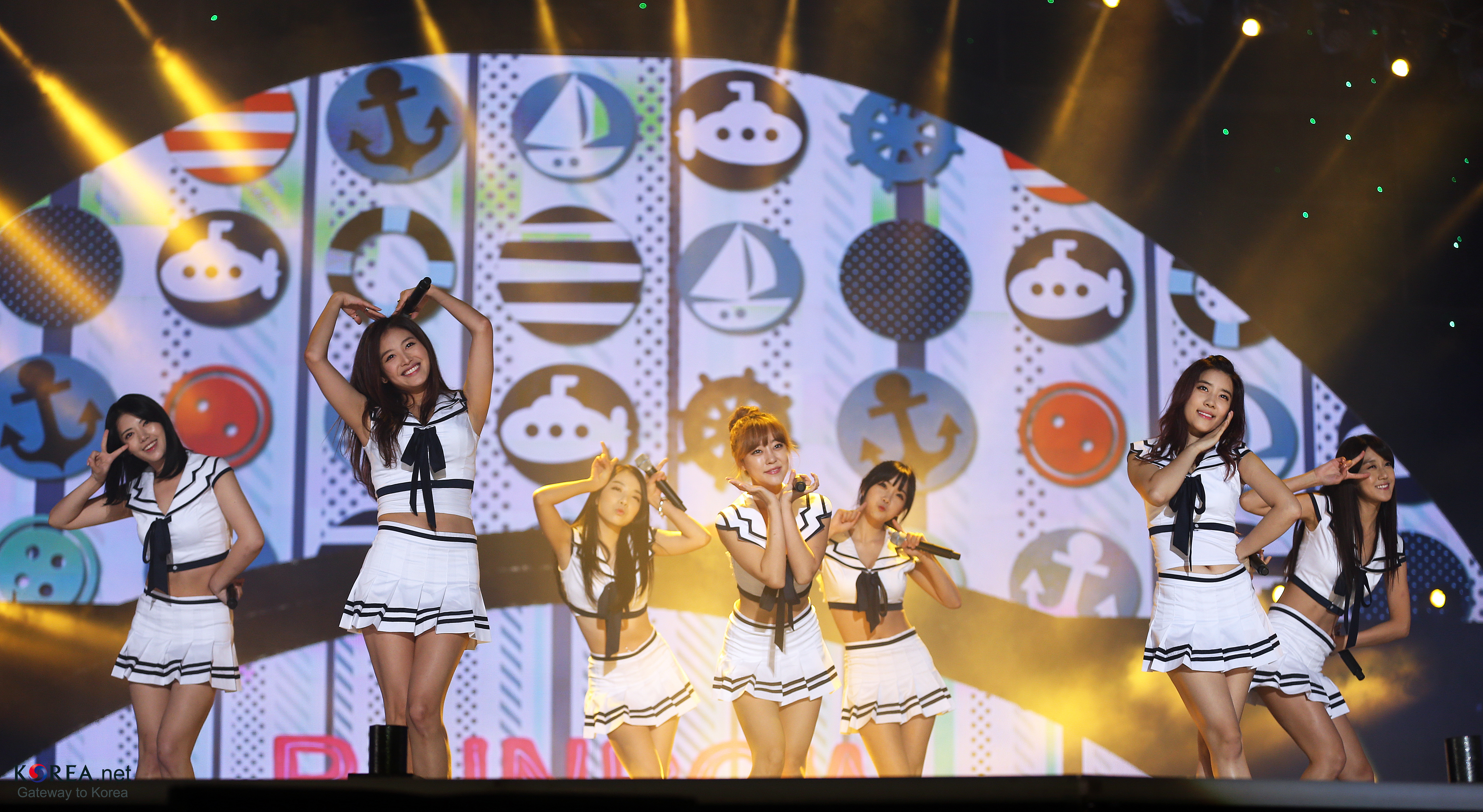
Rainbow performing at the Korea KPOP World Festival

During late October and early November 2009, DSP Media released daily teasers in the form of pictures of Rainbow, and then a music video for "Gossip Girl" on November 6, 2009. On November 12, the five-song EP Gossip Girl was released. On August 12, 2010, Rainbow released the single "A". A second single, "Mach", was released on October 20.

In April 2011, Rainbow released their second EP, So Girls. One song from the EP, "To Me", was released as a single. On September 7, 2011, Rainbow topped Recochoku's weekly download rankings for the Japanese release of their "A" music video. On September 14, 2011, Rainbow released their debut single in the Japanese market, "A", and reached No. 3 on Oricon's daily single chart, selling 10,141 copies. The single release included a Japanese remake of their debut single "Gossip Girl", as well as an exclusive DVD. Rainbow made their Japanese TV debut on the show Sukkiri, performing "A". On December 7, 2011, the group released their second Japanese single, a Japanese version of the song "Mach" (Japanese: マッハ), and reached No. 9 on Oricon's weekly chart.

=== 2012–2013: Rainbow Pixie, Over the Rainbow and Rainbow Syndrome ===
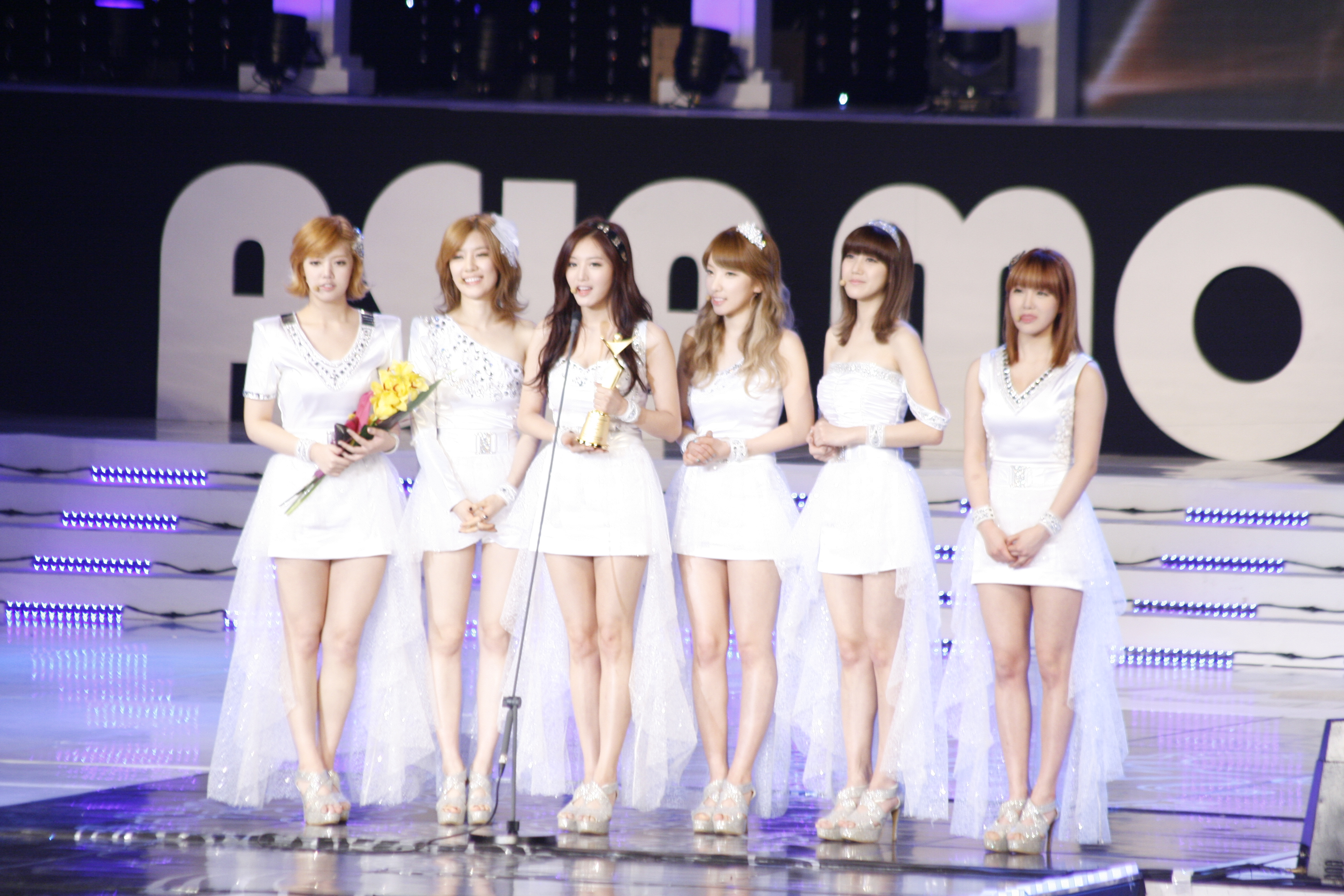
Rainbow at the 2012 Asia Model Festival Awards

On January 3, 2012, DSP Media announced that a section of the group will be formed as a trio. On the same day, DSP drops a teaser image with revealing "Rainbow Pixie" as the trio's name. On January 4, 2012, another image revealed the members of the group as SeungAh, Jisook and Hyunyoung. The group released their debut song, "Hoi Hoi", on January 12, 2012, and held their first performance on Show! Music Core.

Rainbow released a Japanese single on March 14, 2012, entitled "Gonna Gonna Go!" (Japanese: ガナガナGO!). Their Japanese debut album, Over the Rainbow, was released on March 28.

The group released the first part of their first studio album, Rainbow Syndrome, on February 13, 2013.

=== 2014–2016: Rainbow Blaxx, Innocent, Prism and disbandment ===
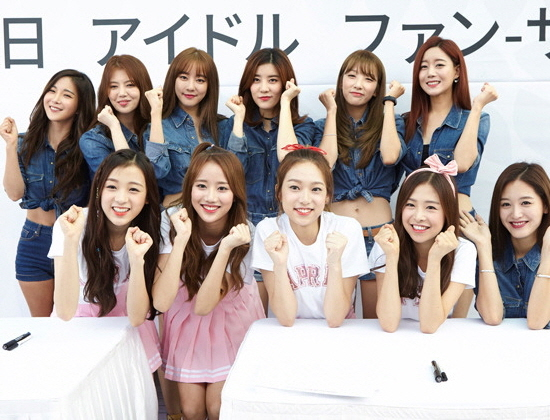
Rainbow with April in September 2016

A second subunit named Rainbow Blaxx, was formed in January 2014 consisting of Jaekyung, Woori, Seungah and Hyunyoung. Their special album, RB Blaxx, was released on January 20, 2014. The music video for the title track, "Cha Cha", was directed by Digipedi and was the fourth-most viewed K-pop music video globally in January 2014. The music video, as well as the song's choreography, drew controversy for being "too sexual".

Rainbow's third EP, Innocent, with the title track "Black Swan" were released on February 23, 2015.

Their fourth EP Prism and the music video for its title track "Whoo" was released on February 15, 2016. They also held their commemorative showcase at the Yes24 Muv Hall in Seoul's Mapo-gu, which was broadcast through Naver's V App on the same day as the album release. Rainbow held their first comeback stage with "Whoo" through SBS MTV's The Show on February 16.

On October 27, 2016, it was confirmed that Rainbow would be disbanded on November 12 as the member contracts were set to end.

=== 2019: Tenth anniversary comeback ===
In November 2019, on their tenth anniversary, the group was re-formed. Their self-produced single, titled "Over the Rainbow", was released on November 14.

== Members ==
- Woori (우리)
- Seungah (승아)
- Jaekyung (재경)
- Noeul (노을)
- Yoonhye (윤혜)
- Jisook (지숙)
- Hyunyoung (현영)

== Discography ==
=== Korean studio albums ===
Title	Album details	Peak positions		Sales
Title	Album details	KOR	JPN	Sales
Rainbow Syndrome	Part 1: Released: February 13, 2013 (KOR); Label: DSP Media, CJ E&M; Formats: CD, digital download	2	164	KOR: 14,179; JPN: 1,850
Rainbow Syndrome	Part 2: Sunshine: Released: June 4, 2013 (KOR); Label: DSP Media, LOEN Entertainment; Formats: CD, digital download	6	234	KOR: 14,179; JPN: 1,850
"—" denotes releases that did not chart or were not released in that region.

=== Japanese studio albums ===
Title	Album details	Peak positions	Sales
Title	Album details	JPN	Sales
Over the Rainbow	Released: March 28, 2012 (JPN); Re-released: December 12, 2012 (JPN); Label: Universal Sigma; Formats: CD, digital download	10	JPN: 31,559
"—" denotes releases that did not chart or were not released in that region.

=== Extended plays ===
Title	Album details	Peak positions	Sales
Title	Album details	KOR	Sales
Gossip Girl	Released: November 12, 2009 (KOR); Label: DSP Media; Formats: CD, digital download	2	KOR: 15,000
So Girls	Released: April 7, 2011; Re-released: June 22, 2011 (KOR); Label: DSP Media; Formats: CD, digital download	3	KOR: 27,697; JPN: 1,422
RB Blaxx	Released: January 20, 2014 (KOR); Label: DSP Media; Formats: CD, digital download	3	KOR: 6,436; JPN: 554
Innocent	Released: February 23, 2015 (KOR); Label: DSP Media; Formats: CD, digital download	5	KOR: 4,176; JPN: 369
Prism	Released: February 15, 2016 (KOR); Label: DSP Media; Formats: CD, digital download	8	KOR: 3,809; JPN: 422
Over the Rainbow	Released: November 14, 2019 (KOR); Label: DSP Media; Formats: Digital download	—	—N/a
"—" denotes releases that did not chart or were not released in that region.

=== Korean singles ===
Title	Year	Peak chart positions			Sales (Note: Korea sale is a digital sales only by Gaon Music Chart and Japan is a CD single sales by Oricon)	Album
Title	Year	KOR Gaon	KOR Hot	US World	Sales	Album
"Gossip Girl"	2009	62	—	—	—N/a	Gossip Girl
"Not Your Girl"	2010	84	—	—	—N/a	Gossip Girl
"A"	2010	9	—	—	KOR: 1,617,074	So Girls
"Mach"	2010	19	—	—	—N/a	So Girls
"To Me" (내게로)	2011	5	—	—	KOR: 1,484,948	So Girls
"Sweet Dream"	2011	8	—	—	KOR: 1,266,120	So Girls
"Tell Me Tell Me"	2013	14	13	—	KOR: 754,331	Rainbow Syndrome
"Sunshine"	2013	13	8	—	KOR: 401,939	Rainbow Syndrome
"Black Swan"	2015	43	—	16	KOR: 47,132	Innocent
"Whoo"	2016	40	—	—	KOR: 66,968	Prism
"Aurora"	2019	—	—	—	—N/a	Over the Rainbow
Rainbow Pixie / Rainbow Blaxx / Rainbow18 (sub-unit)
"Hoi Hoi" (호이 호이) (as Rainbow Pixie)	2012	35	35	—	KOR: 664,610	Non-album single
"Cha Cha" (as Rainbow Blaxx)	2014	20	26	—	KOR: 342,833	RB Blaxx
"Festival" (as Rainbow18)	2025	—	—	—		Festival
"—" denotes releases that did not chart or were not released in that region.

=== Japanese singles ===
Title	Year	Peak chart positions		Sales (Note: Korea sale is a digital sales only by Gaon Music Chart and Japan is a CD single sales by Oricon)	Album
Title	Year	JPN Oricon	JPN Hot	Sales	Album
"A"	2011	3	4	JPN: 45,000	Over the Rainbow
"Mach"	2011	9	15	JPN: 22,000	Over the Rainbow
"Gonna Gonna Go!"	2012	7	23	JPN: 17,000	Over the Rainbow
"—" denotes releases that did not chart or were not released in that region.

=== Other charted songs ===
Title	Year	Peak chart positions	Album
Title	Year	KOR	Album
"Sad But Romantic" (슬퍼도 로맨틱)	2010	62	The Sparkling OST Part.1
"Kiss"	2010	115	Gossip Girl
"So Cool"	2011	104	So Girls
"I Said You're The One" (너뿐이라고)	2011	111	So Girls
"I'm With You" (그대와 난)	2011	61	City Hunter OST
"A Story You Never Knew But I Know" (나만 아는 너는 절대 모를 이야기)	2013	143*	Rainbow Syndrome
"Golden Touch"	2013	200*	Rainbow Syndrome
"*" denotes releases on domestic chart only.

=== Soundtracks ===
Year	Title	TV series/Film
2010	"Love you, Like you" (사랑해, 좋아해)	KBS2 Secret Agent Miss Oh
2011	"Sad But Romantic" (슬퍼도 로맨틱)	MBC Sparkling
2011	"I Love Zoobles"	SBS Zoobles!
2011	"The Adventures of Zoobles"	SBS Zoobles!
2011	"You and I" (그대와 난)	SBS City Hunter
2012	"Candy Girls"	TV Tokyo Zoobles!
2012	"Sweet" (달콤해)	TV Tokyo Rainbow Rose

Year	Title	Artist(s)	TV series/Film
2011	"Galpangjilpang"	Hyunyoung, Gyuri	MBC Hooray for Love
2012	"We Shall Love"	Jisook, Min Hoon Ki	tvN I Love Italy

== Awards and nominations ==
Award ceremony	Year	Category	Nominee	Result	Ref.
Cyworld Digital Music Awards	2010	Rookie of the Month – September	"A"	Won	
Mnet Asian Music Awards	2010	Best New Female Artist	Rainbow	Nominated	
Golden Disc Awards	2011	Hallyu Icon Award	Rainbow	Won	
Asia Model Awards	2012	New Star Award	Rainbow	Won	
