= Over the Rainbow (disambiguation) =

"Over the Rainbow" is a song from the musical film The Wizard of Oz (1939).

Over the Rainbow or Somewhere Over the Rainbow may also refer to:

== Music ==
- Over the Rainbow (band), a rock tribute band formed in 2008 by former members of Rainbow
- "Somewhere Over the Rainbow"/"What a Wonderful World", a 1993 medley by Israel Kamakawiwoʻole
- "Over the Rainbow", a song by Todrick Hall from Straight Outta Oz

=== Albums ===
- Over the Rainbow (2007 charity album)
- Over the Rainbow (Angela Chang album), 2004
- Over the Rainbow (Benny Carter album), 1988
- Over the Rainbow (Mai Kuraki album), 2012
- Over the Rainbow (New York Unit album), 1992
- Over the Rainbow (Rainbow album), 2012
- Over the Rainbow (Rainbow EP), 2019
- Over the Rainbow (Jo Stafford album), 2004
- Over the Rainbow (Connie Talbot album), 2007
- Over the Rainbow (Livingston Taylor album), 1973
- Over the Rainbow (A Compilation of Rarities 1981–1983), an album by the Virgin Prunes
- Over the Rainbow (Nocera album), 1987
- Over the Rainbow – The Songbird Collection, a 2005 compilation album of female singer/songwriters
- Somewhere Over the Rainbow (Willie Nelson album), 1981
- Somewhere Over the Rainbow (Harold Mabern album), 2006
- Over the Rainbow (The Last Concert, Live!) a 1975 album, by various artists, recorded at the Rainbow Theatre in London

== Television ==
- Over the Rainbow (1979 TV series), a TVB television series
- Over the Rainbow (1993 TV series), a UK television sitcom series
- Over the Rainbow (2006 TV series), a South Korean television series
- Over the Rainbow (2010 TV series), a UK television series
- Over the Rainbow (Canadian TV series), a Canadian television series based on the 2010 UK series
- "Over the Rainbow" (Angel), 2001
- "Somewhere Over the Rainbow Bridge", a Hercules: The Legendary Journeys episode

== Other uses ==
- Over the Rainbow (organization), a non-profit organization based in Hong Kong serving the families of lesbians and gays
- Over the Rainbow (film), a 2002 South Korean film
- Over the Rainbow, a 1997 French film directed by Alexandre Aja
- Over the Rainbow (novel), a 2012 novel by Paul Pickering
- Somewhere Over the Rainbow, a star in Super Mario 64 and Super Mario 64 DS
- Over the Rainbow, a star in Super Mario 64 DS (known as Wing Mario Over the Rainbow in Super Mario 64)
