= Kim Ji-sook (singer) =

South Korean singer and actress (born 1990)

- 김지숙
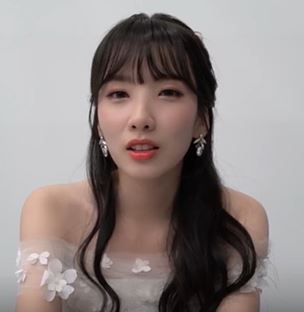
- Kim in 2018
- Born: July 18, 1990 (age 36); Suwon, South Korea
- Education: Hanyang Women's University
- Occupations: Singer; actress
- Agent: STARIT Entertainment
- Spouse: Lee Du-hee (m. 2020)
- Musical career
- Genre: K-pop
- Instrument: Vocals
- Years active: 2009–present
- Label: DSP Media
- Formerly of: Rainbow; Rainbow Pixie

Korean name
- Hangul: 김지숙
- Hanja: 金智淑
- RR: Gim Jisuk
- MR: Kim Chisuk

Kim Ji-sook (Korean: 김지숙; born July 18, 1990), known mononymously as Jisook, is a South Korean singer and actress. She is a former member of South Korean girl group Rainbow.

== Early life and education ==
Kim graduated from Changhyeon High School. She was active in a rock band during high school and won the top prize for singing at the Suwon General Arts Festival. At a practical music academy, she joined Rainbow at recommendation of Kim Sung-hee, a former member of Kara. Kim graduated from Hanyang Women's University, also Kim Sung-hee's alma mater.

== Career ==
=== 2009–2016: Rainbow ===
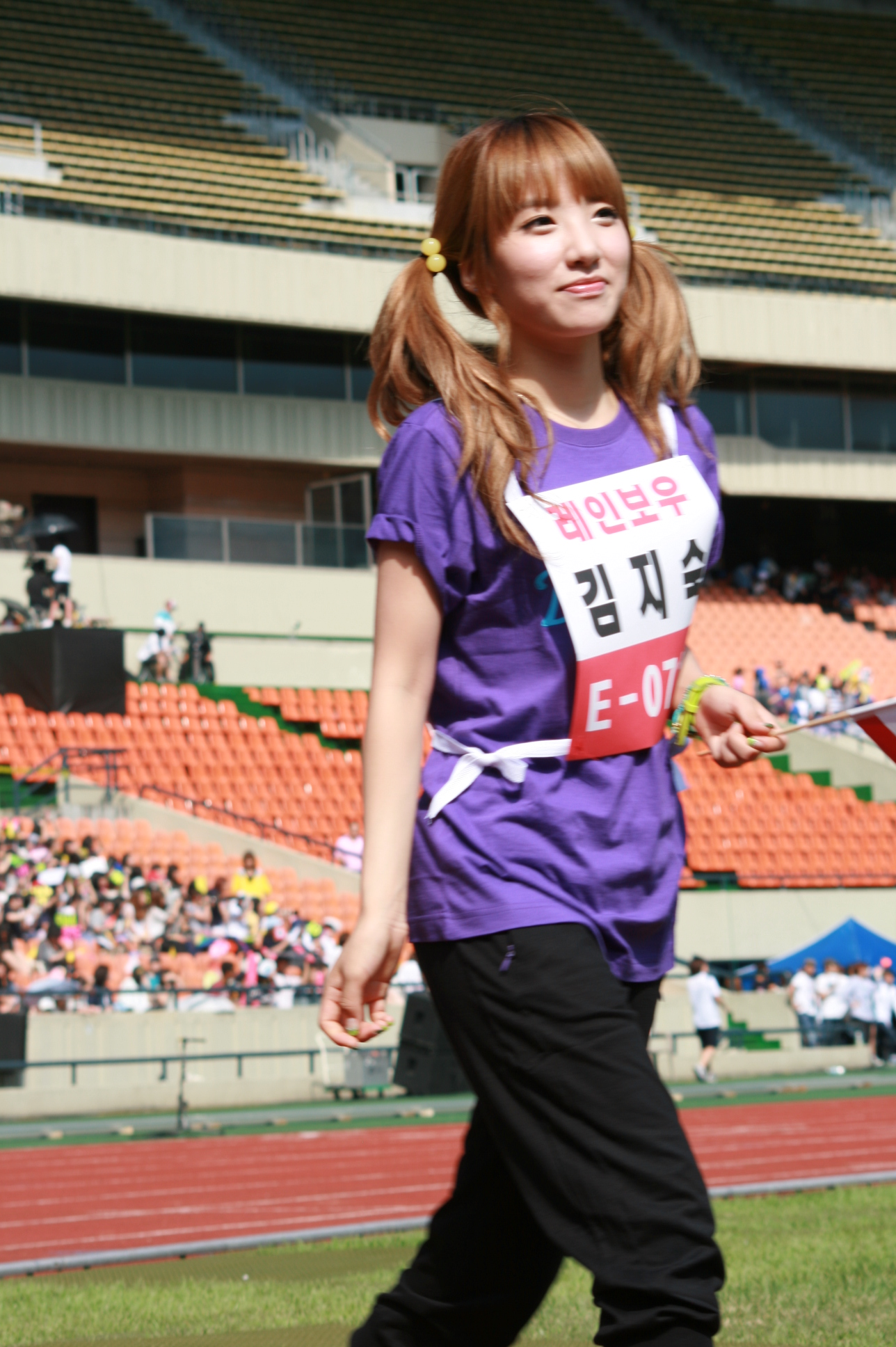
Kim in 2011

On November 12, 2009, Rainbow released their first music video "Gossip Girl", alongside their EP of the same name. On January 12, 2012, Kim debuted as a member of the Rainbow subunit Rainbow Pixie alongside groupmates Seungah and Hyunyoung with "Hoi Hoi".

In June 2012, Kim released "Shall We Fall in Love?" for the soundtrack of I Love Lee Taly with Min Hoon-ki.

Kim was the 2015 Gyeonggi Provincial Police Agency (now Gyeonggi Provincial Southern Provincial Police Agency) Public Relations Ambassador.

On October 27, 2016, it was confirmed that Rainbow would disband on November 12 with the end of the members' contracts.

=== 2017–present: Solo debut, acting, and Rainbow reunion ===
On February 15, 2017, Dmost Entertainment announced that Kim had signed with them.

In August 2017, Kim made her solo debut with Baesisi, the title track of the same name featuring BTOB's Jung Il-hoon. In January 2019, DMOST stated that Kim was to make a comeback the next month.

In November 2019, Rainbow reformed on the group's tenth anniversary. They released the EP Over the Rainbow on November 14.

In 2021, Kim was cast in Imitation, a television series about idols in the entertainment industry, as Eun-jin, a talented stylist.

== Personal life ==
Kim's mother died in 2012 of an undisclosed illness; her mother had hidden the severity of the illness as Kim had been promoting at the time.

Kim enjoys photography. She took the debut profile pictures for I.B.I, a girl group formed by five former Produce 101 contestants. Kim also held a charity gallery from February 5 to February 25, 2015, at Gallery Illum in the Chungmuro district of downtown Seoul.

Kim was cast with boyfriend Lee Du-hee in Don't Be Jealous. They announced their marriage plans for on the show; they later announced the date as October 31, 2020.

== Discography ==
=== Singles ===
Title	Year	Peak chart positions	Album
Title	Year	KOR	Album
"Shall We Fall in Love?" Korean: 우리 사랑할까요 (with Min Hoon-ki)	2012	—	I Love Lee Taly: Original Soundtrack
"Secret Love"	2013	—	Secret Love OST
"My Hero"	2014	—	Can We Fall in Love, Again? OST
"I Love You" Korean: 비밀낙원 (with Hyunyoung)	2014	—	Blade Man OST
"Baesisi" (with Jung Il-hoon)	2017	—	Baesisi

== Filmography ==
=== Television series ===
Year	Title	Role	Notes	Ref.
20??	Quickness (The Power to Discover Rankings)	MC		
2012	Strong Heart	Guest	Episodes 117–118, 155–158.	
20??	Entertainment Weekly	Reporter	KBS2	
20??	Lord of the Game		JTBC	
20??	100 People's Choice - Best Ramen	Member of fixed panel	MBC EVERY1	
20??	Gifted and Talented Exploration Team	Member of fixed panel	SBS	
20??	Pretty Avengers		Onstyle	
2016	I Live Alone	Guest	Ep. 160 (Guest), 165 (Appearance)	
2017	Song Ji-hyo's Beauty View	Guest	Episode 3	
2017	King of Mask Singer	Participant	Episode 115; "Flood of Music, Oasis of My Heart"	
20??	Idol Tour	MC	MBC Music	
2017–2018	A Man Who Feeds The Dog Season 2	Guest	Channel A	
2017	The Different Class		JTBC	
2019	Feast on the Street		KBS1	
2020	Live Happy Dream Lotto 6/45	Guest	MBC, Episode 889	
2021	Imitation	Eun-jin	Supporting role	
