= Rainbow Syndrome =

2013 studio album by Rainbow

- Part 1 digital cover

Studio album by Rainbow
- Released: February 13, 2013 (Part 1); June 4, 2013 (Part 2)
- Recorded: 2012–2013
- Genres: Dance-pop, electropop
- Length: 19:49 (Part 1)
- Labels: DSP Media, CJ E&M, LOEN

Rainbow chronology
Over the Rainbow (2012)	Rainbow Syndrome (2013)	Innocent (2015)

Singles from Rainbow Syndrome: Part 1
- 1. "Tell Me Tell Me" Released: February 13, 2013

Rainbow Syndrome: Part 2
- Part 2 digital cover

Singles from Rainbow Syndrome: Part 2
- 1. "Sunshine" Released: June 5, 2013

Rainbow Syndrome is the second studio album and first major Korean release by South Korean girl group Rainbow. Initial a full-length album, The album was split into two parts, with the first being released on February 13, 2013, containing six songs. "Tell Me Tell Me" was used to promote the release. The second installment was released on June 4, 2013 containing seven songs. "Sunshine" was used to promote the second part.

== History ==
=== Part 1 ===
Following promotions of the repackage of So Girls, the group promoted in Japan for the remainder of 2011, along with most of 2012. In January 2012 however, a sub-unit consisting of Jisook, HyunYoung and Seungah called Rainbow Pixie promoted single "Hoi Hoi". Later in the year, Hyun Young was diagnosed with a vocal cord polyp and underwent surgery for its removal. The group ended up not promoting together for a year and ten months in Korea, until this album. On January 22, DSP confirmed the groups return in February 2013, revealing a brand new concept photo on January 29. The album track list was revealed in a "Tracklist Video" featuring Woo-ri rapping the song titles in a cover of Azealia Banks' single "212".

=== Part 2 ===
DSP confirmed on May 22, 2013 that the group would be returning after almost 4 months with the release of "Part 2" of the album on June 5, 2013. The concept and style of the title track, "Sunshine" was described as "fun and colorful, and perfect for the summer season". The jacket photo and track list was released a few days later.

== Track listing ==
Track list – Part 1
No.	Title	Lyrics	Music	Arrangement	Length
1.	"Golden Touch"	Zig Zag Note	Deez	Deez	3:14
2.	"Close Your Eyes" (두 눈을 감고; Du Nuneul Gamgo)	Chanmi Lee, Sumi	Zig Zag Note	Zig Zag Note	3:53
3.	"Tell Me Tell Me"	Red Rocket, C-No	Red Rocket	Red Rocket	3:04
4.	"Cosmic Girl"	Zig Zag Note	Zig Zag Note	Zig Zag Note	3:13
5.	"A Story You Never Knew But I Know" (나만 아는 너는 절대 모를 이야기; Naman Aneun Neoneun Jeoldae Moreul Iyagi)	Cha Yong-un, Zig Zag Note	Zig Zag Note	Zig Zag Note	3:26
6.	"In Love"	Cha Yong-un	Kim Tae-sung, Andrew Choi, Command Freaks	Kim Tae-sung, Andrew Choi, Command Freaks	3:03
Total length:					19:49

Track list – Part 2
No.	Title	Lyrics	Music	Arrangement	Length
1.	"Kiss Me"	Deez	Deez	Deez	3:47
2.	"Sunshine"	Kang Ji-won, Kim Ki-bum	Kang Ji-won, Kim Ki-bum	Kang Ji-won, Kim Ki-bum	3:26
3.	"Don't Touch"	Red Rocket, C-NO,	Red Rocket	Red Rocket	3:03
4.	"Let's Dance"	Red Rocket, C-NO,	Red Rocket	Red Rocket	3:50
5.	"I'll Wait For You" (기다릴게; Gidarilge)	Rphabet	Rphabet	Rphabet	3:23
6.	"Eenie Meenie Minie Moe"	Chanmi Lee, Haein Park	ZigZag Note	ZigZag Note	3:26
7.	"Chewing Time"	Bumzu, EachONE, DJ R2	Bumzu, EachONE, DJ R2	Bumzu, EachONE, DJ R2	3:19
Total length:					24:14

== Chart performance ==
=== Album chart ===
==== Part 1 ====
Chart	Peak position
Gaon weekly album chart	2
Gaon weekly regional album chart	1
Gaon monthly album chart	12
Gaon monthly regional album chart	11

==== Part 2 ====
Chart	Peak position
Gaon weekly album chart	6
Gaon weekly regional album chart	5
Gaon monthly album chart	15
Gaon monthly regional album chart	14

=== Total sales ===
Chart	Sales
Gaon physical sales	14,179+
Oricon physical sales	972+

=== Singles ===
Title	Peak positions	
Title	KOR	KOR
Title	Gaon	K-Pop Hot 100
"Tell Me Tell Me"	14	13
"Sunshine"	13	8

=== Other charted songs ===
Title	Peak chart positions
Title	KOR
"A Story You Never Knew But I Know"	143
"Golden Touch"	200

== Release history ==
Country	Date	Format	Label	Edition
South Korea	February 13, 2013	Digital download	DSP Media; CJ E&M	Part 1
South Korea	February 14, 2013	CD	DSP Media; CJ E&M	Part 1
Worldwide	February 14, 2013	Digital download	DSP Media; CJ E&M	Part 1
South Korea	June 4, 2013	Digital download	DSP Media; LOEN Entertainment	Part 2
South Korea	June 5, 2013	CD	DSP Media; LOEN Entertainment	Part 2
Worldwide	June 4, 2013	Digital download	DSP Media; LOEN Entertainment	Part 2
