= Wild About Harry =

Wild About Harry may refer to:

- Wild About Harry!, a studio album by Harry James with The Harry James Orchestra
- Wild About Harry (album), a comedy album by Bob & Tom
- Wild About Harry (novel), written by Paul Pickering
- Wild About Harry (2000 film)
- Wild About Harry (2009 film), a 2009 film starring Danielle Savre and Tate Donovan
- "Wild About Harry", an episode of Me and My Girl

== See also ==
- Wild About Hurry, a short film featuring Wile E. Coyote and Road Runner
- "I'm Just Wild About Harry", a 1921 song for the broadway Shuffle Along
- I'm Just Wild About Jerry, a Tom & Jerry short film
- Harry Wild Jones, a 19th-century architect from Minneapolis, Minnesota
