= Hanyang Women's University =

Private university in South Korea

- 한양여자대학교 (漢陽女子大學校)
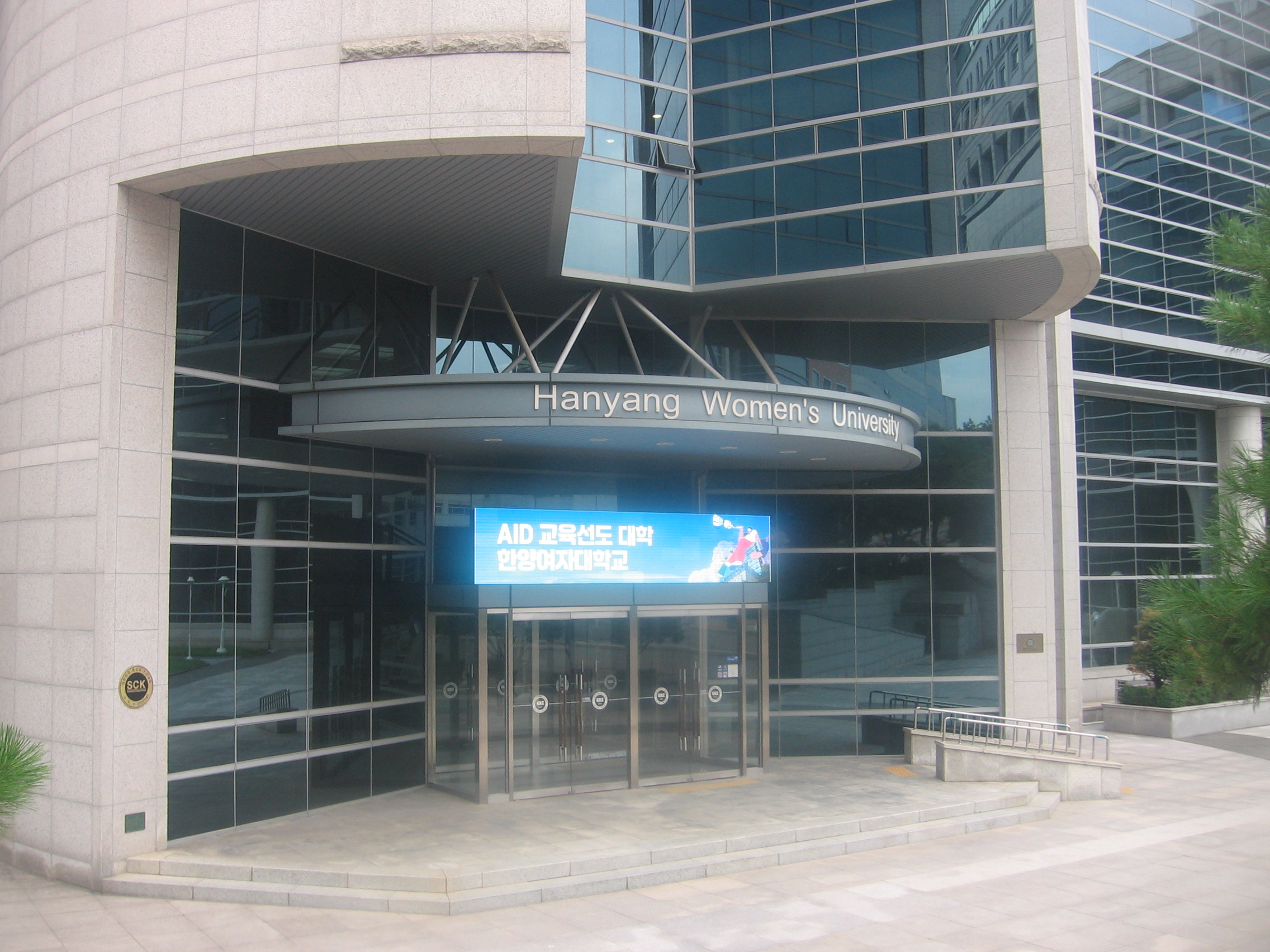
- Former names: Hanyang Women's Vocational School (1974–1978); Hanyang Women's Junior College (1979–1998); Hanyang Women's College (1999–2012)
- Motto: Dedication, Integrity, Humility and Service
- Type: Private
- Established: December 20, 1974
- Students: 7,538
- Location: Seoul, South Korea; 37.5589°N 127.0497°E
- Campus: Urban
- Mascot: Pigeon
- Website: www.hywoman.ac.kr/english

Korean name
- Hangul: 한양여자대학교
- Hanja: 漢陽女子大學校
- RR: Hanyang yeoja daehakgyo
- MR: Hanyang yŏja taehakkyo

Hanyang Women's University (Korean: 한양여자대학교) is a private college in South Korea. The campus is located in Haengdang-dong, Seongdong-gu in Seoul.

== History ==
The school began on December 20, 1974, as Hanyang Women's Vocational School, on the campus of Hanyang University by the school corporation Hanyang Academy. The school was upgraded to the status of Junior College, thus renamed as Hanyang Women's Junior College in December 1978. In March 1979, it moved from the Hanyang University campus to its current location. The college was renamed as Hanyang Women's College in 1998. In 2012 it attained university status, thus renamed as Hanyang Women's University.

The university is a part of the Hanyang Foundation (한양학원) which also includes Hanyang University and a system of schools that educate children from kindergarten until high school.

In September 2003, the university established the Management System Research Institute and the Industry-University Cooperation Support Center. In November 2008, the Department of Social Physical Education and Practical Music was selected as the best department of department evaluation from the Korea College of Education. In February 2010, Hanyang Women's University was established as an affiliate organization. In July 2013, it opened an art museum and was selected as an excellent university for the education capacity enhancement project by the Ministry of Education.

== Academics ==
Hanyang Women's University organizes 30 majors in 4 departments; they also offer professional bachelor's degree courses.

- Division of Technology
  - Department of Computer Science & Information Systems
  - Department of Internet Informatics
  - Department of Apparel Design
  - Department of Knit Fashion Design
  - Department of Textile Design
- Division of Natural Sciences
  - Department of Food & Nutrition
  - Department of Food Service Industry
  - Department of Dental Hygiene
  - Department of Public Health Administration
- Division of Humanities & Social Sciences
  - Department of Early Childhood Education
  - Department of International Tourism
  - Department of English
  - Department of Business Administration
  - Department of Tax and Accounting
  - Department of Woman Resources Development
  - Department of Japanese Interpretation
  - Department of Chinese
  - Department of Child Education & Welfare
- Division of Arts & Sports
  - Department of Industrial Design
  - Department of Interior Design
  - Department of Illustration
  - Department of Visual Media Design
  - Department of Ceramic Arts
  - Department of Creative Writing
  - Department of Sport & Leisure Studies
  - Department of Broadcasting & Visual Image Design
  - Department of Applied Music

=== Overseas exchange ===
Hanyang Women's University has sister universities with whom it holds student exchanges with.

- Long Island University
- George Washington University
- Queensland University of Technology
- The University of Newcastle, Australia

== Notable alumni ==
=== Politicians ===
- Shim Jae-ok [ko], politician

=== Musicians ===
- Chae Soo-yeon, singer
- Choi Na-young [ko], singer
- Jeon Dan-bi [ko], singer
- Kang Ae-ri-ja [ko], singer
- Kim Min-seo, singer and actress
- Kim Min-young [ko], singer
- Kim Ji-sook, singer (Rainbow)
- Kim Mi-ryeo [ko], comedian and singer
- Kim Se-jeong, singer and actress (I.O.I and Gugudan)
- Kim So-young, singer
- Kim Sung-hee [ko], former singer (Kara)
- Kim Yong-sun (Solar), singer-songwriter and actress (Mamamoo)
- Kim Yun-seol [ko], singer
- Kwon Min-jung [ko], singer
- Pyo Hye-mi [ko], singer and actress (Nine Muses)
- Yumin [ko], singer
- Choi Yoo-bin (Chaebin), singer (Nature)

=== Film industry ===
- Choi Ji-na, actress
- Hà Hoàng Hải Yên [ko], actress
- Jeon Hye-jin [ko], actress and former Miss Korea
- Jo Eun-sook, actress
- Kwon Ki-seon [ko], actress
- Lee Chung-mi, actress
- Lee Se-hee, actress
- Lee Sung-eun [ko], musical actress
- Paeng Hyeon-sook [ko], comedian

=== Sports ===
- Ji So-yun, footballer
- Jung Hye-jin [ko], footballer
- Jung Seol-bin, footballer
- Kang Yu-mi, footballer
- Kim Soo-yun, footballer
- Seo Hyun-sook, footballer
- Shin Min-ah [ko], footballer

== See also ==
- List of colleges and universities in South Korea
- Education in South Korea
