= Gonna Gonna Go! =

"Gonna Gonna Go!" "ガナガナGO!"
- Regular edition cover

Single by Rainbow

from the album Over the Rainbow
- B-side: "Hello"; "Hoi Hoi"
- Released: March 14, 2012
- Recorded: 2011–2012
- Genre: Dance-pop
- Length: 3:54
- Label: Universal Sigma
- Songwriters: Han Sang Won; Kaori Moriwaka; NICE73

Rainbow singles chronology
"Hoi Hoi" (2012)	"Gonna Gonna Go!" "ガナガナGO!" (2012)	"Candy Girls!" (2012)

"Gonna Gonna Go!" (ガナガナGO!, Gana Gana Go!) is a song by South Korean girl group Rainbow. This is the group's third Japanese single and the first not to be re-recorded from Korean. The single was released on March 14, 2012, in four different editions: three limited editions (CD+DVD, CD and 28-page Photobook and a regular edition with a bonus track) and a regular edition.

== Background ==
The single was first announced by the store Amazon Japan on February 12 and then officially announced by their Korean label, DSP Media, on February 15. The group did a handshake event to commemorate the release of the single. The event was realized in Tokyo on March 17 and in Osaka on March 18.

The limited edition of the regular edition comes with the song "Hoi Hoi", released by the sub-unit Rainbow Pixie, which is composed by the members SeungAh, Jisook and HyunYoung. The song was already released in South Korea as a digital single.

== Composition ==
"Gonna Gonna Go!" was produced by Han Sang Won, same producer of the song "Not Your Girl", included as a B-side on the single "Mach", as well the Korean version, included on their debut EP Gossip Girl.

== Music video ==
A teaser of the video was first introduced on the TV show ZIP! on February 24 and later revealed on YouTube by their Japanese label, Universal Sigma, on the same day. The preview was revealed along with the announcement of their debut Japanese album Over the Rainbow. The full music video premiered on the TV station Space Shower TV on February 27.

== Live performance ==
The first TV live performance of the song was on TV Tokyo's show Melodix! on March 24. The group is scheduled to make another performance of the song on NTV's show Happy Music on April 6.

== Track listing ==
Japanese single:
No.	Title	Lyrics	Music	Length
1.	"Gonna Gonna Go!" (ガナガナGO!; Gana Gana Go!)	Han Sang Won, Kaori Moriwaka, NICE73 (Rap only)	Han Sang Won	3:54
2.	"Hello"	Lae Joo-Hyoung, G-High, Mai Watarai, Emyli (Rap only)	Lae Joo-Hyoung, G-High	3:16
3.	"Gonna Gonna Go!" (Instrumental)		Han Sang Won	3:51
Total length:				11:01

Type C - Bonus track:
No.	Title	Lyrics	Music	Length
4.	"Hoi Hoi" (호이 호이) (Rainbow Pixie)	Haylie	Park Se Hyun, Blacc Hole	3:18
Total length:				14:20

DVD (Limited edition – Type A):
No.	Title	Length
1.	"Gonna Gonna Go!" (Music video)
2.	"Gonna Gonna Go!" (Music video – Dance version)
3.	"Gonna Gonna Go!" (Music video – Behind the Scenes)

== Charts ==
=== Oricon ===
Released	Oricon Chart	Peak	Debut sales	Sales total
March 14, 2012	Daily Singles Chart	6	13,587	16,858
March 14, 2012	Weekly Singles Chart	7	13,587	16,858
March 14, 2012	Monthly Singles Chart	41	13,587	16,858

=== Other charts ===
Chart	Peak position
Billboard Japan Hot 100	23
Billboard Japan Hot Singles Sales	6
Billboard Japan Hot Top Airplay	73
RIAJ Digital Track Chart weekly top 100	86

== Release history ==
Country	Date	Format	Label
Japan	March 7, 2012	Ringtone	Universal Sigma
Japan	March 14, 2012	CD single, Digital download	Universal Sigma
