= Charlie Peace =

Charlie Peace may refer to:

- Charlie Peace (comics), a comic strip in the UK comic Buster
- Charlie Peace (novel), a comic novel by British writer Paul Pickering
- Charles Peace (1832–1879), English burglar and murderer
