= Yeonnam-dong 539 =

2018 South Korean television series

- Promotional poster
- Hangul: 연남동 539
- RR: Yeonnam-dong 539
- MR: Yŏnnam-dong 539
- Genre: Slice-of-life
- Created by: MBN
- Written by: Kim Jin-kyung; Lee Ji-hyun
- Directed by: Kang Yoon; Han Yool
- Starring: see below
- Country of origin: South Korea
- Original language: Korean

Production
- Executive producer: Hwang Hyuk
- Producer: Park Sang-hyun
- Camera setup: Single-camera
- Running time: 60 mins
- Production company: PK Media Creative

Original release
- Network: MBN
- Release: January 10 – March 28, 2018

Yeonnam-dong 539 (Korean: 연남동 539) is a 2018 television series starring an ensemble cast. It aired on MBN from January 10 to March 28, 2018, on Wednesdays at 23:00 (KST).

== Synopsis ==
Revolves around the story of people renting rooms in a shared house in the neighborhood of Yeonnam.

== Cast ==
- Lee Jong-hyuk as Sang Bong-tae

A detective in the cyber crimes unit and in charge of a voice phishing related activity.

- Oh Yoon-ah as Yoon Yi-na

Owner of a fitness center.

- Lee Moon-sik as Jordan

Owner of the shared house. He is a retired fisherman, who sets up the shared house for singles.

- Brian Joo as Lion

Former lead singer of a boy band.

- Go Na-eun as Seo Deok-hee

A job seeker in her third year of unemployment. She possesses an excellent memory and academic background, but lacks the connections.

- Yang Jung-won as Yang Soo-ri

A Pilates trainer.

- Choi Woo-hyuk as Goo Tae-young

A personal trainer working at a fitness center, who is popular with the ladies.

- Chunji as Jo Da-woon

A distant but warm high school student.

- Choi Jae-woo as Joon-young

A member of the band Ryan used to be in. He bickers with Ryan all the time, and falls in love with Deok-hee.

- Oh In-hye as Chung Joo-eun

== Original soundtrack ==
Yeonnam-dong 539 OST

Soundtrack album by Various Artists
- Recorded: 2018
- Genre: Soundtrack
- Languages: Korean; English
- Labels: CSM Company, TSN Company

=== Part 1 ===
No.	Title	Music	Artist	Length
1.	"Suffocating" (답답해)	Gyak Song	Various artists
2.	"Follow the Road" (Inst.)	Gyak Song

=== Part 2 ===
No.	Title	Artist	Length
1.	"Someday" (언젠가는)	DRO
2.	"Someday" (Inst.)

=== Part 3 ===
No.	Title	Artist	Length
1.	"Don't Hide" (숨기지마)	Han Kyung-soo
2.	"Don't Hide" (Inst.)

=== Part 4 ===
No.	Title	Artist	Length
1.	"It Will Pass" (지나갈거에요)	Son Min-kyung
2.	"It Will Pass" (Inst.)

=== Part 5 ===
No.	Title	Artist	Length
1.	"You Are Only a Flea" (뛰어봤자 벼룩)	Brian Joo
2.	"You Are Only a Flea" (Inst.)

== Viewership ==
Note: This drama airs on cable channel / pay TV which has a relatively small audience compared to free-to-air TV / public broadcasters (KBS, MBC, SBS, and EBS).

Date	Episode	Title	AGB Nielsen (%)	TNmS (%)
2018-01-10	01	We Are Always Either Too Late or Too Early 우리는 항상 늦거나 빠르다	1.914	2.1
2018-01-17	02	Always By Your Side 항상 네 옆에 서있다	1.824	1.5
2018-01-24	03	Revenge Is Best Served Cold 복수는 차갑게 식었을 때 가장 맛있다	1.575	1.3
2018-01-31	04	Boats Float Only When There's Enough Water 물이 차야 배가 떠오른다	1.480	1.4
2018-02-07	05	It's Okay Because You Are a Mom 엄마니까 괜찮아	1.295	1.7
2018-02-14	06	You Know It's Love Because You're Hurting 아프니까 사랑이다	0.967	1.0
2018-02-21	07	My Beloved Enemies 사랑하는 나의 적들	1.026	1.2
2018-02-28	08	Give thanks You for Coming to Me 고마워! 나에게 와줘서	1.420	1.2
2018-03-07	09	This Is How You Become a Mother 그렇게 엄마가 된다	1.267	1.4
2018-03-14	10	What Can Be Changed by Courage 용기가 바꾸는 것들	1.160	1.1
2018-03-21	11	Friends and Enemies Always Come Together 적과 친구는 항상 함께 온다	1.147	1.3
2018-03-28	12	It's Not Over Until It's Over 끝날 때까지 끝난 게 아니다	1.109	1.3
Average			1.349%	1.4%
