= Paul Pickering =

British novelist and playwright (born 1952)

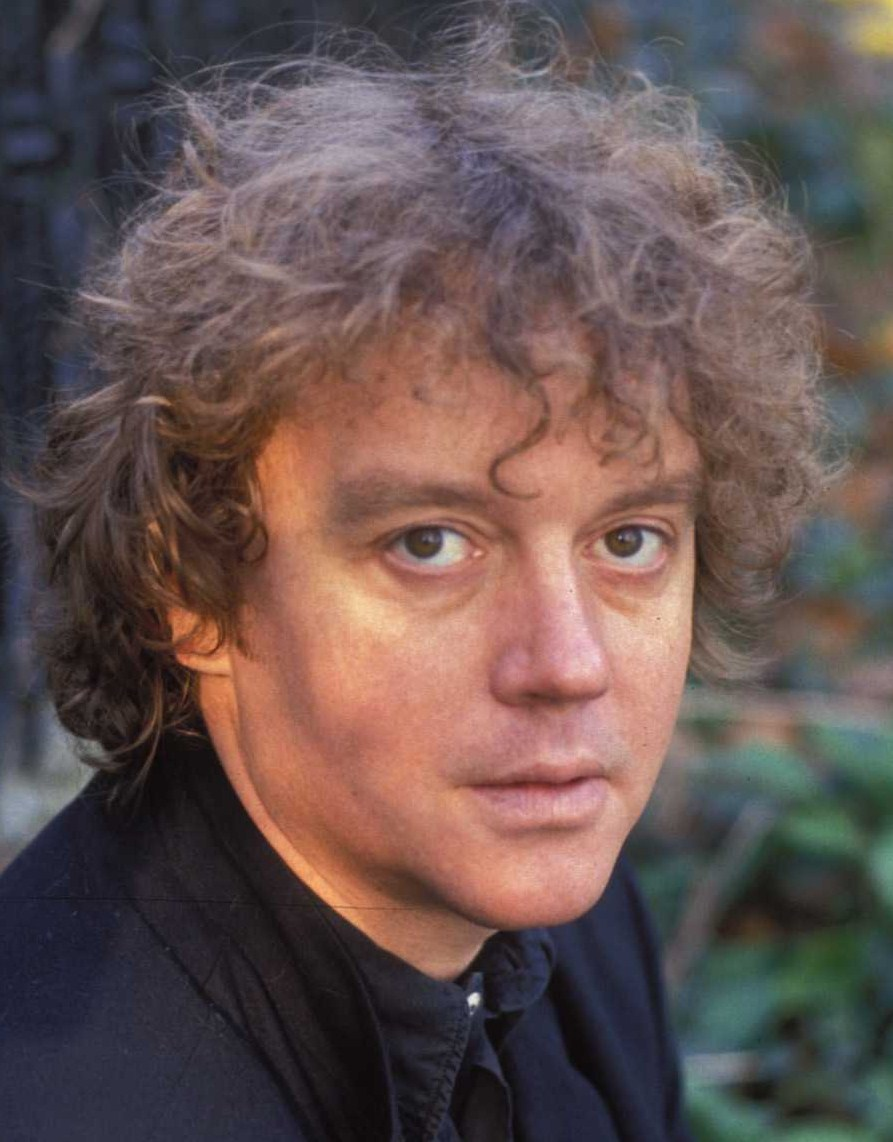
- Born: 9 May 1952 (age 74); Rotherham, Yorkshire, England
- Occupations: Novelist and playwright
- Known for: Wild About Harry, Perfect English, The Blue Gate of Babylon, Charlie Peace, The Leopard's Wife, Over The Rainbow, Elephant

Paul Pickering (born 9 May 1952) is a British novelist and playwright.

== Early life ==
Pickering was born in Rotherham, Yorkshire, England, the son of Arthur Samuel Pickering and Lorna (née Grocock). On his father’s side he is related to the Pre-Raphaelite artist Evelyn de Morgan, (née Pickering) and George III, and on his mother’s side to Yorkshire and Irish gypsy showmen. His father died when he was nine and he was educated at the Royal Masonic Schools for Boys in Bushey, Hertfordshire, and in vacations worked for Pearl Connor-Mogotsi, at the Edric Connor agency, which was a pioneer in promoting black theatre and the musical Hair.

Pickering attended the University of Leicester, where he read Psychology and Combined Arts and participated in revolutionary politics, was a union representative, and helped found the Anti-Internment League. From working in the steel works in vacations he financed hitch-hiking expeditions in north Africa and the Middle East but was prevented from getting to India after being banned from Iran for depicting the Shah half-dressed as a woman in a university sketch. In 2020, he was awarded his Doctor of Philosophy (PhD) in Creative Writing by Bath Spa University.

== Career ==
Pickering started his career as a journalist and columnist for The Times, The Sunday Times, Punch and the Evening Standard, among other publications, but wrote his first novel, Wild About Harry, after an assignment to Paraguay to find the war criminal Josef Mengele. The novel was both a critical and popular success and was long-listed for the Man Booker Prize. His second novel, Perfect English, about a young "Internationalista" in combat, as he, himself, had been, in Nicaragua, was long listed for the Man Booker Prize and became another best seller. His next novel, The Blue Gate of Babylon, also long-listed for the Man Booker Prize, was also a best-seller and was chosen by The New York Times as a notable book of the year and Pickering was chosen as one of WH Smith's top ten young British novelists. Charlie Peace, his next controversial novel about the second coming of Christ in modern times, drew the quote from J. G. Ballard that Pickering was "a truly subversive author" and called the decision not to publish the book in Britain "pure censorship". The controversy led The Sunday Times to dub him "the de facto Norman Mailer of the British Literati".

After a near-fatal stabbing in the Groucho Club in 1997 that blinded him in one eye, Pickering went to the Democratic Republic of the Congo in the last stages of the civil war, and produced The Leopard's Wife to favourable reviews. He then went to Afghanistan for his highly acclaimed novel Over the Rainbow. Pickering’s latest novel, Elephant, begins in Czarist St Petersburg and is about Pushkin's idea of unselfish and redemptive love and an exceptional African elephant, the only sane being amid wars and refugees, racial conflict and a world gone mad. It is a story written by a lover, knowing his poet love is lost, but wanting to get her writing again. Pickering has written short stories, poems and articles for publications all over the world. His work has been compared to that of Evelyn Waugh and Graham Greene, but lately to Don DeLillo, Peter Carey and Bulgakov.

== Personal life ==
Pickering married artist and writer Alice Beckett in 1983 in Mahé in the Seychelles. They have one daughter, Persephone, born 1993, who works for Mind in Kingston. Pickering is a member of the Serpentine Swimming Club and is a keen scuba diver and a non-impact mountaineer and skier and practices Tai Chi. He has run six marathons and performs with Soho Poets.

== Honours and awards ==
- 1985: Wild About Harry long-listed for the Man Booker Prize.
- 1986: Perfect English long-listed for the Man Booker Prize.
- 1989: The Blue Gate of Babylon long-listed for the Man Booker Prize.
- 1989: Top Ten Young British Novelists.
- 1989: The Blue Gate of Babylon The New York Times notable book of the year.
- 2014: onwards, Member of the Folio Prize Academy.
- 2019: Hawthornden Residency - Casa Ecco, Lake Como.
- 2019: Presented PhD thesis, Sympathy for the Devil, to Bulgakov Society in Moscow.

== Bibliography ==
=== Novels ===
- Wild About Harry (1985)
- Perfect English (1986)
- The Blue Gate of Babylon (1989)
- Charlie Peace (1991)
- The Leopard's Wife (2010)
- Over the Rainbow (2012)
- Elephant (2021)

=== Plays ===
- After Hamlet (1994)
- Walk Her Home (1999)
- Coming Home - Whose Game is it Anyway? (2019)

=== Short-story collections ===
- Dream Kitchen, Winter's Tales No. 5 (1989)
