= The Blue Gate of Babylon =

1989 novel by Paul Pickering

- First edition
- Author: Paul Pickering
- Language: English
- Genre: Literary Fiction
- Publisher: Chatto & Windus
- Publication date: 1989
- Publication place: United Kingdom
- Media type: Print (Hardback), (Paperback)
- Pages: 266
- ISBN: 0-7011-3413-5

The Blue Gate of Babylon is the third comic novel by British writer Paul Pickering. It was published by Chatto & Windus and Penguin Books in the United Kingdom and Random House in the United States, was long-listed for the Booker Prize, became a New York Times notable book of the year and saw Pickering included in the Top Ten Young British Novelists. The novel received favourable reviews on both sides of the Atlantic.
