= Prism (Rainbow EP) =

- Digital cover

EP by Rainbow
- Released: February 15, 2016
- Recorded: 2015–2016
- Genres: K-pop; R&B; ballad
- Labels: DSP Media; LOEN Entertainment

Rainbow chronology
| Innocent (2015) | Prism (2016) | Over the Rainbow (2019) |

Singles from Prism
- 1. "Whoo" Released: February 15, 2016

Prism is the fourth extended play by South Korean girl group Rainbow. It was released on February 15, 2016, by DSP Media and distributed by LOEN Entertainment.

== Background ==
On January 28, Rainbow posted a puzzle teaser on their Facebook page, titled "Can You Guess the Name of the Title Song?". On February 1, they revealed the title song, called "Whoo". On February 5, they posted the first teaser picture for the extended play. On February 12, they released a teaser for the music video for "Whoo". The extended play and official music video for "Whoo" was released on February 15.

== Track listing ==
| No. | Title | Lyrics | Music | Length |
|---|---|---|---|---|
| 1. | "Saying I Miss You" (보고 싶다는 그 말도; Bogo Sipdaneun Geu Maldo) | G-High (Mono Tree) | Lee Juhhyung (Mono Tree) | 03:54 |
| 2. | "Whoo" | 어벤전승, Woori | 어벤전승 | 03:35 |
| 3. | "Black & White" | ZigZag Note, Mafly | ZigZag Note | 03:31 |
| 4. | "Click!" | e.one, Woori | e.one | 03:14 |
| 5. | "Eye Contact" | Heidi | Heidi | 02:59 |
| 6. | "Whoo" (Instrumental) | | 어벤전승 | 03:35 |
