= Over the Rainbow (novel) =

2012 novel by Paul Pickering

- First edition
- Author: Paul Pickering
- Language: English
- Genre: Fiction, Literary Fiction
- Publisher: Simon & Schuster
- Publication date: 2012
- Publication place: United Kingdom
- Media type: Print (Hardback) and E-book
- Pages: 352
- ISBN: 978-1-84737-829-3
- Preceded by: The Leopard's Wife

Over the Rainbow is the sixth novel by British writer Paul Pickering. It is an often darkly comic love story set against the background of the war and aid work in Afghanistan.
