= Wild About Harry (novel) =

1985 novel by Paul Pickering

- First edition
- Author: Paul Pickering
- Language: English
- Genre: Literary fiction
- Published: 1985 by Weidenfeld & Nicolson
- Publication place: United Kingdom
- Media type: Print (Hardback & Paperback)
- Pages: 212 pp
- ISBN: 0-297-78572-9
- OCLC: 11666889
- Dewey Decimal: 823.914
- LC Class: PR6066.I258
- Followed by: Perfect English

Wild About Harry is the first novel by British writer Paul Pickering. It was published by Weidenfeld & Nicolson in 1985 and Collins in 1986. The book was published in America by Atheneum Books in 1985. Pickering researched the novel in Paraguay when he was sent to look for the Nazi war criminal Josef Mengele by Sir James Goldsmith’s NOW! magazine.

== Plot summary ==
In Paraguay an English Major, Harry Copeland-Smith is guarding a war criminal and in his best efforts to protect him becomes like his charge.

== Reception ==
The Times called the book the best black comedy of the year and Valentine Cunningham, Professor of English language and literature at the University of Oxford said in The Observer that it was a 'smashing debut from a new comic novelist of terrific promise.' The Listener magazine said it was better than Graham Greene. The novel was long-listed for the Booker Prize and shortlisted for the David Higham Prize for Fiction and received good reviews.
