= Over the Rainbow (Rainbow album) =

- Digital and regular edition

Studio album by Rainbow
- Released: March 28, 2012 (Japan)
- Recorded: 2011–2012
- Genre: J-pop
- Length: 36:00
- Label: Universal Sigma

Rainbow chronology
So Girls (2011)	Over the Rainbow (2012)	Rainbow Syndrome (2013)

Singles from Over the Rainbow
- 1. "A" Released: September 14, 2011; 2. "Mach" Released: December 7, 2011; 3. "Gonna Gonna Go!" Released: March 14, 2012; 4. "Candy Girls!" Released: September 5, 2012

Over the Rainbow (オーバー ザ レインボー) is the debut studio album and first major Japanese release of South Korean girl group Rainbow, It was released on March 28, 2012, in Japan under Universal Sigma. The album was released in two versions, a CD and DVD edition and a regular CD edition. It was preceded by the singles "A", "Mach" and first original Japanese single "Gonna Gonna Go!". The album was re-released on December 12, 2012, in three different editions.

== Editions ==
=== Standard version ===
The album was released in two different editions: a CD and DVD edition and a regular CD edition.

The CD and DVD edition contains the CD album and a DVD containing the "RAINBOW Premium Live at SHIBUYA PUBLIC HALL" show, including the songs "Mach", "Not Your Girl", "To Me", "Gossip Girl", and "A". It also includes a backstage video of the "Premium Live" show, and a special music video of "Mach", featuring more solo and group shots, also known as a "Close-Up" version from the original music video.

The regular CD edition of Over the Rainbow contains only the CD album itself.

=== Special version ===
Nine months later, on December 12, the album was re-released in three different editions: two CD and DVD editions and a 2CD-only edition.

The CD and DVD editions include the Over The Rainbow album and a special DVD: Type A includes all music videos of the group included on the albums and Type B includes performances of all Korean promotional tracks at that time being, "Gossip Girl", "Not Your Girl", "A", "Mach", "To Me" and "Sweet Dream". All performances are from the KBS' show Music Bank.

The CD only edition includes two CDs: the standard Over the Rainbow as CD 1 and a special Korean greatest hits on the CD 2, including tracks from the mini albums Gossip Girl and So Girls. This edition includes the Japanese song "Candy Girls!", theme song of the animated show Zoobles!, as bonus track of the CD 2.

== Track listing ==
Standard and special edition Disc one
No.	Title	Lyrics	Music	Length
1.	"A" (エー; Ē)	Song Soo-yun, Yu Shimoji, NICE73 (Rap making)	Han Jae-ho, Kim Seung-soo	3:25
2.	"Mach" (マッハ; Maha)	Song Soo-yun, Han Jae-ho, Kim Seung-soo Natsumi Watanabe, Yu Shimoji, NICE73	Han Jae-ho, Kim Seung-soo	3:14
3.	"Gonna Gonna Go!" (ガナガナGO!; Gana Gana GO!)	Han Sang-won, Kaori Moriwaka, NICE73 (Rap making)	Han Sang-won	3:53
4.	"Kiss! Kiss! Disco!"	Mai Watarai, Emyli (Rap making)	ZigZagNote	3:18
5.	"Touch Me, Feel Me, Love Me"	Shoko Fujibayashi	Emyli	4:16
6.	"Alright"	Kanao Itabashi, NICE73 (Rap making)	Mohombi Moupondo, Bruno Lopez, Santiago Rodriguez, Ninos Hanna, Joakim Jarl & Alexander Papadimas	4:24
7.	"Not Your Girl" (ノット ユア ガール; Notto Yua Gāru)	Han Sang-won	Han Sang-won, Shihomi, NICE73	3:29
8.	"Energy"	Will Simms, Ronny Svendsen, Anne Judith Wik, Erik Lewander, Emyli	Will Simms, Ronny Svendsen, Anne Judith Wik, Erik Lewander	3:44
9.	"Hello"	Lae Joo-hyoung, G-High, Mai Watarai, Emyli (Rap making)	Lae Joo-hyoung, G-High	3:14
10.	"Gossip Girl" (ゴシップガール; Goshippugāru)	Hur Youn-won, Litz, NICE73 (Rap making)	Hur Youn-won	3:07
Total length:				36:00

Standard edition – DVD: RAINBOW Premium live at Shibuya Public Hall
No.	Title	Length
1.	"Mach" (マッハ)
2.	"Not Your Girl" (ノットユアガール)
3.	"Gossip Girl" (ゴシップガール)
4.	"To Me"
5.	"A" (エー)
6.	"Mach" (Encore)
7.	"Backstage of Premium Live" (Backstage Video Shoot)
8.	"Mach" (Music video – Rainbow version)

Special edition disc two
No.	Title	Lyrics	Music	Length
1.	"Not Your Girl"	Han Sang-won	Han Sang-won
2.	"Gossip Girl"	Hur Youn-won	Hur Youn-won
3.	"I Believe"	Song Soo-yun, Han Jae-ho, Kim Seung-soo	Han Jae-ho, Kim Seung-soo
4.	"Kiss"	Kim Bo-ah, Park Jung-min	Lee Joo-hyung
5.	"A"	Song Soo-yun	Han Jae-ho, Kim Seung-soo
6.	"Mach"	Song Soo-yun	Han Jae-ho, Kim Seung-soo
7.	"To Me" (내게로..; Naegero..)	N-Sun, Double K	Daishi Dance, A.I.P
8.	"Sweet Dream"	Gil Hak-mi, Double K	Park Se-hyun, Daishi Dance, A.I.P
9.	"Candy Girls!" (Bonus track)

Special edition – DVD (Type A: music videos)
No.	Title	Length
1.	"Gossip Girl"
2.	"A" (Korean version)
3.	"To Me"
4.	"Sweet Dream"
5.	"A" (Japanese version)
6.	"Mach" (Japanese version)
7.	"Gonna Gonna Go!"
8.	"Candy Girls!"

Special edition – DVD (Type B: Korean live performances)
No.	Title	Length
1.	"Gossip Girl"
2.	"Not Your Girl"
3.	"A"
4.	"Mach"
5.	"To Me"
6.	"Sweet Dream"

== Charts ==
=== Oricon ===
Oricon Chart	Peak	Debut sales	Sales total
Daily Albums Chart	5	13,009 (Weekly); 17,364 (Monthly)	31,559+
Weekly Albums Chart	10	13,009 (Weekly); 17,364 (Monthly)	31,559+
Monthly Albums Chart	37	13,009 (Weekly); 17,364 (Monthly)	31,559+

=== Other charts ===
Chart	Peak position
Billboard Japan Top Albums	10

== Release history ==
Country	Date	Distributing label	Edition
Japan	March 28, 2012	Universal Sigma	CD+DVD Edition
Japan	March 28, 2012	Universal Sigma	CD
Japan	December 12, 2012	Universal Sigma	2 CD+DVD
Japan	December 12, 2012	Universal Sigma	2CD
