= Perfect English =

1986 comic novel by Paul Pickering

- First edition
- Author: Paul Pickering
- Language: English
- Genre: Literary Fiction
- Publisher: Weidenfeld & Nicolson
- Publication date: 1986
- Publication place: United Kingdom
- Media type: Print (Hardback), (Paperback)
- Pages: 205
- ISBN: 0-297-78952-X

Perfect English is the second blackly comic novel by British writer Paul Pickering. It is based on his own experience as an "Internationalista" in the war in Nicaragua against the Contras. The novel was long-listed for the Booker Prize, and received very favourable reviews.

Pickering was for a while under siege in the Nicaraguan town of Bluefields, where he helped former Baader-Meinhof printer, novelist and playwright, Peter-Paul Zahl, build a Bertolt Brecht youth theatre after his first was destroyed in the invasion of Grenada. A central concern of the novel is to illustrate how the best intentions can go horribly wrong.
