= A (Rainbow song) =

2010 song by Rainbow

- Original Korean version

Single by Rainbow
- Released: August 12, 2010
- Recorded: 2010
- Genre: Dance-pop; K-pop
- Length: 3:23
- Label: DSP Media
- Songwriters: Song Soo Yoon; Han Jae Ho; Kim Seung Soo

Rainbow singles chronology
"Not Your Girl" (2010)	"A" (2010)	"Mach" (2010)

Music video
- "A" on YouTube

"A" is a song by the South Korean girl group Rainbow. It was released on August 12, 2010, and was later included on their second mini album So Girls.

Professional ratings
Review scores
Source	Rating
IZM	1/5 stars

== Background ==
A teaser photo with the concept of the song was released on August 4. A teaser of the music video was released on August 10 and the full music video on August 12, along with the release of the single.

== Composition ==
The song was produced by Han Jae Ho and Kim Seung Soo (also known as Sweetune), who also produced the songs "Rock U", "Pretty Girl", "Honey", "Wanna", "Mister" and "Lupin" for their label-mate KARA.

== Promotions ==
The promotions of the song started on August 13 in the KBS's Music Bank. It was also promoted on MBC's Music Core, SBS's Inkigayo and Mnet's M! Countdown.

== Track listing ==
Korean digital single:
No.	Title	Lyrics	Music	Length
1.	"A"	Song Soo Yoon	Han Jae Ho, Kim Seung Soo	3:23
2.	"A (Inst.)"	Song Soo Yoon	Han Jae Ho, Kim Seung Soo	3:23
Total length:				6:26

== Chart performance ==
In the first week, the song was at number 50 and climbed to the number 11 the following week. The peak position was 9, in the week of September 4. The song ranked number 80 in Gaon's yearly chart with 337,665,388 points and with 1,617,074 digital copies sold.

== Charts ==
Chart (2010)	Peak position
Gaon Monthly singles	13
Gaon Weekly singles	9
Gaon Yearly singles	80

== Japanese version ==
"A (エー)"
- Regular edition cover

Single by Rainbow

from the album Over the Rainbow
- B-side: "Gossip Girl"; "A" (Korean)
- Released: September 14, 2011
- Recorded: 2011
- Genre: Dance-pop
- Length: 3:22
- Label: Universal Sigma
- Songwriters: Song Soo Yoon; Han Jae Ho; Kim Seung Soo

Rainbow singles chronology
"Sweet Dream" (2011)	"A (エー)" (2011)	"Mach" (2011)

The song was re-record in Japanese as the group's first single in Japan. It was released digitally on September 7, 2011, and physically on September 14 in four different versions: three limited editions (CD+DVD, CD + 32-pages photobook and CD only with a bonus track) and a regular edition.

=== Composition ===
The Japanese version remains some lyrics written by Song Soo Yoon and was translated by Yu Shimoji and nice73. The B-side is a Japanese version of the song "Gossip Girl", previously recorded in Korean. The song is the lead single from their first EP Gossip Girl.

=== Promotions ===
In Japan, Rainbow performed the song on the shows Happy Music, Hey!Hey!Hey! Music Champ and Music Japan. The group held their first event in the Ikebukuro district of Tokyo with a crowd of 2,000 fans. They performed "A" and had a 15-minute talk session.

=== Track listing ===
Japanese single:
No.	Title	Lyrics	Music	Length
1.	"A" (エー; Ē)	Yu Shimoji, nice73	Han Jae Ho, Kim Seung Soo	3:22
2.	"Gossip Girl" (ゴシップガール; Goshippugāru)	Litz, nice73	Hur Youn Won	3:11
3.	"A" (Instrumental)		Han Jae Ho, Kim Seung Soo	3:23
Total length:				9:55

Type C - Bonus track
No.	Title	Lyrics	Music	Length
4.	"A" (Korean version)	Song Soo Yoon, Yu Shimoji, nice73	Han Jae Ho, Kim Seung Soo	3:23
Total length:				13:18

DVD (Limited Edition - Type A)
No.	Title	Length
1.	"A" (Music video)
2.	"Belly Dance Lesson"
3.	"A" (Music video - Dance version)
4.	"A" (Music video - Behind the scenes)

=== Chart performance ===
The physical single began at number 3 in Oricon's daily chart and also number 3 in Oricon's weekly chart with 24,082 copies sold in the first week. After hearing about their position in Japan, the girls said, "When we first heard that we were ranked in third, we were all surprised because we had no idea that they'd take such an interest in us. There were even some members who cried. There's also a lot of pressure in that we have to work harder and do better. We're still very grateful and thankful for our position on the charts. Since we're already receiving so much love, we're really not anticipating a rise in the weekly charts. For the remainder of our stay here, we're just going to do our best."

=== Charts ===
==== Oricon ====
Oricon Chart	Peak	Debut sales	Sales total
Daily Singles Chart	3	24,082	44,858
Weekly Singles Chart	3	24,082	44,858
Monthly Singles Chart	18	24,082	44,858
Yearly Singles Chart	172	24,082	44,858

==== Other charts ====
Chart	Peak position
Billboard Japan Hot 100	4
RIAJ Digital Track Chart weekly top 100	15

== Ab dance controversy ==
The "ab dance" in Rainbow's choreography was banned from broadcasting on September 8, 2010, because it was "too sexually suggestive". The dance move involves the group lifting their shirts up to the point where their abdomen or stomach can be seen before taking them down again which was deemed similar to a strip tease. The music video was also age restricted on YouTube, but DSP retired the restriction. They started promoting the song without the "ab dance" on September 11.

However, when the group promoted the song in Japan they were allowed to perform the dance, and referred to it as the "belly dance".

== Release history ==
Country	Date	Format	Label
South Korea	August 12, 2010	Digital download, Promotional single	DSP Media
Japan	September 7, 2011	Digital download	Universal Sigma
Japan	September 14, 2011	CD single	Universal Sigma
