= Innocent (EP) =

- Innocent digital artwork

EP by Rainbow
- Released: February 23, 2015
- Recorded: Seoul, South Korea; 2014
- Genre: K-pop, ballad, dance-pop
- Length: 20:25
- Label: DSP Media; LOEN Entertainment

Rainbow chronology
Rainbow Syndrome (2014)	Innocent (2015)	Prism (2016)

Singles from Innocent
- 1. "Black Swan" Released: February 23, 2015

Innocent is the third Korean EP by South Korean girl group Rainbow. The album was released in South Korea on February 25, 2015 with "Black Swan" as the lead single. It marked their first comeback after a year and eight month of hiatus since 2013's Rainbow Syndrome.

== Background ==
On February 11, Rainbow has revealed their image teaser with the concept that "Elegant". Then on February 15, the group teaser a style film about their album. In the clip, each member is outfitted in a unique all white dress shedding their girl-next-door image for a more mature tone. As previously noted, the girls are taking on a luxurious vibe this time. The video gives off a sultry, feminine aura that is very elegant. The full music video of lead track "Black Swan" was released on February 23.

== Promotion and music show termination ==
Rainbow began their promotion from Mnet's M! Countdown on February 26, then continued with various music shows.

However, according to DSP Media on March 11 through Rainbow‘s fan café, Rainbow wrapped up their "Black Swan" promotions after just two weeks. The agency said: "With last week's music show, [Rainbow’s] 'Black Swan' promotions have come to an end. Many thanks to all the fans who supported Rainbow's third mini album, and we’ll work hard to return new and improved. Thank you."
The songs were unable to give them a spot in the top 100 and failed to garner significant interest, resulting in the early termination of promotions.

== Track listing ==
No.	Title	Lyrics	Music	Arrangement	Length
1.	"Bad Man Crying" (나쁜 남자가 운다; Nappeun Namjaga Unda)	어벤전숭, Sum, Son Hye-sung	어벤전숭	어벤전숭	03:10
2.	"Black Swan"	하라는, Ricky, 엔느	하라는, Ricky	하라는, Ricky	03:37
3.	"Mr. Lee"	어깨깡패, Kasper	어깨깡패	Cosmic Sounds	03:26
4.	"Pierrot"	Nam Gi-sang	Nam Gi-sang, Kwon Sun-ik, Choi Do-gwan	Choi Do-gwan	03:12
5.	"Privacy"	G-high, Kim Yu-suk, Shin Agnes	G-high, Kim Yu-suk, Shin Agnes	G-high, Kim Yu-suk	03:00
6.	"A Little More" (조금 더; Jogeum Deo)	MachWave	MachWave	MachWave	03:09
Total length:					20:25

== Charts ==
Chart (Gaon)	Peak position
South Korean weekly album chart	5
South Korean monthly album chart	10

== Sales ==
Country	Sales
Gaon physical sales	4,176+

== Release history ==
Country	Date	Format	Label
South Korea	February 23, 2015	CD, Digital download	DSP Media; LOEN Entertainment
Japan	March 25, 2015	CD	Universal Sigma
