= Over the Rainbow – The Songbird Collection =

Compilation album by Various artists
- Released: February 21, 2005
- Recorded: various
- Length: 153 minutes
- Label: Universal Classics and Jazz

Over the Rainbow – The Songbird Collection is a compilation album of female singer/songwriters, recorded by various artists and released in 2005 (see 2005 in music). Contained in this collection are the greats of years past and the forerunners of contemporary music, ranging from Eva Cassidy and Katie Melua to Joan Baez and Natalie Cole.

== Track listing ==
=== Disc One ===
1. "Over the Rainbow" – Eva Cassidy
2. "Faraway Voice" – Katie Melua
3. "Cry Me a River" – Diana Krall
4. "You're Still the One" – Shania Twain
5. "What You're Made Of" – Lucie Silvas
6. "Say What You Want" – Texas
7. "Stay" – Beulah
8. "The Weakness in Me" – Joan Armatrading
9. "I Heard Love Is Blind" – Amy Winehouse
10. "Two Grey Rooms" – Joni Mitchell
11. "I Don't Want to Talk About It" – Everything but the Girl
12. "Mary, Did You Know?" – Hayley Westenra
13. "Forever Young" – Joan Baez
14. "Give Me a Little More Time" – Gabrielle
15. "Coming Around Again" – Carly Simon
16. "Grow Old with Me" – Mary Chapin Carpenter
17. "Do What You Have to Do" – Sarah McLachlan
18. "Down by the Sally Gardens" – Roisin O'Reilly
19. "Lead the Way" – Lizz Wright

=== Disc Two ===
1. "Runaway" – The Corrs
2. "Marlene on the Wall" – Suzanne Vega
3. "The Man I Love" – Alison Moyet
4. "The Windmills of Your Mind" – Dusty Springfield
5. "What You Do With What You Got" – Eddi Reader with The Patron Saints Of Imperfection
6. "Down to the River to Pray" – Alison Krauss
7. "A Thousand Miles" – Vanessa Carlton
8. "Every Little Thing She Does Is Magic" – Shawn Colvin
9. "Only Love Can Break Your Heart" – Gwyneth Herbert
10. "Completely" – Jodie Brooke Wilson
11. "Dreamsome" – Shelby Lynne
12. "Dance Me to the End of Love" – Madeleine Peyroux
13. "The Moon and St Christopher" – Mary Black
14. "Sleeping Satellite" – Tasmin Archer
15. "Don't Know Why" – Jude Sim
16. "Both Sides Now" – Nana
17. "Falling" – Moya Brennan
18. "Tell Me All About It" – Natalie Cole
19. "Strange Winds Blow" – Honeyriders
20. "Breathe Me" – Sia
