= The Leopard's Wife =

2010 novel by Paul Pickering

- First edition
- Author: Paul Pickering
- Language: English
- Genre: Fiction, Literary Fiction
- Publisher: Simon & Schuster
- Publication date: 2010
- Publication place: United Kingdom
- Media type: Print (Hardback), (Paperback) and E-book
- Pages: 352
- ISBN: 978-1-84737-827-9

The Leopard's Wife is the fifth novel by British writer Paul Pickering. It was published by Simon & Schuster in the United States and United Kingdom in 2010. The novel was called ‘brilliant’ by The Times, the newspaper for which Pickering writes, and "lackluster" by "Publishers Weekly".;

Like Pickering's previous novels, the chief concern of the novel is moral ambivalence both on the margins of order and in an increasingly post American world. Pickering travelled down the Congo River in the last stages of the war from Kisangani to Kinshasa to research the novel but had been planning the story partially based in a public school for 15 years. The novel shows the link between such an education and what has happened to Africa today.
