= Go Woo-ri =

South Korean singer and actress

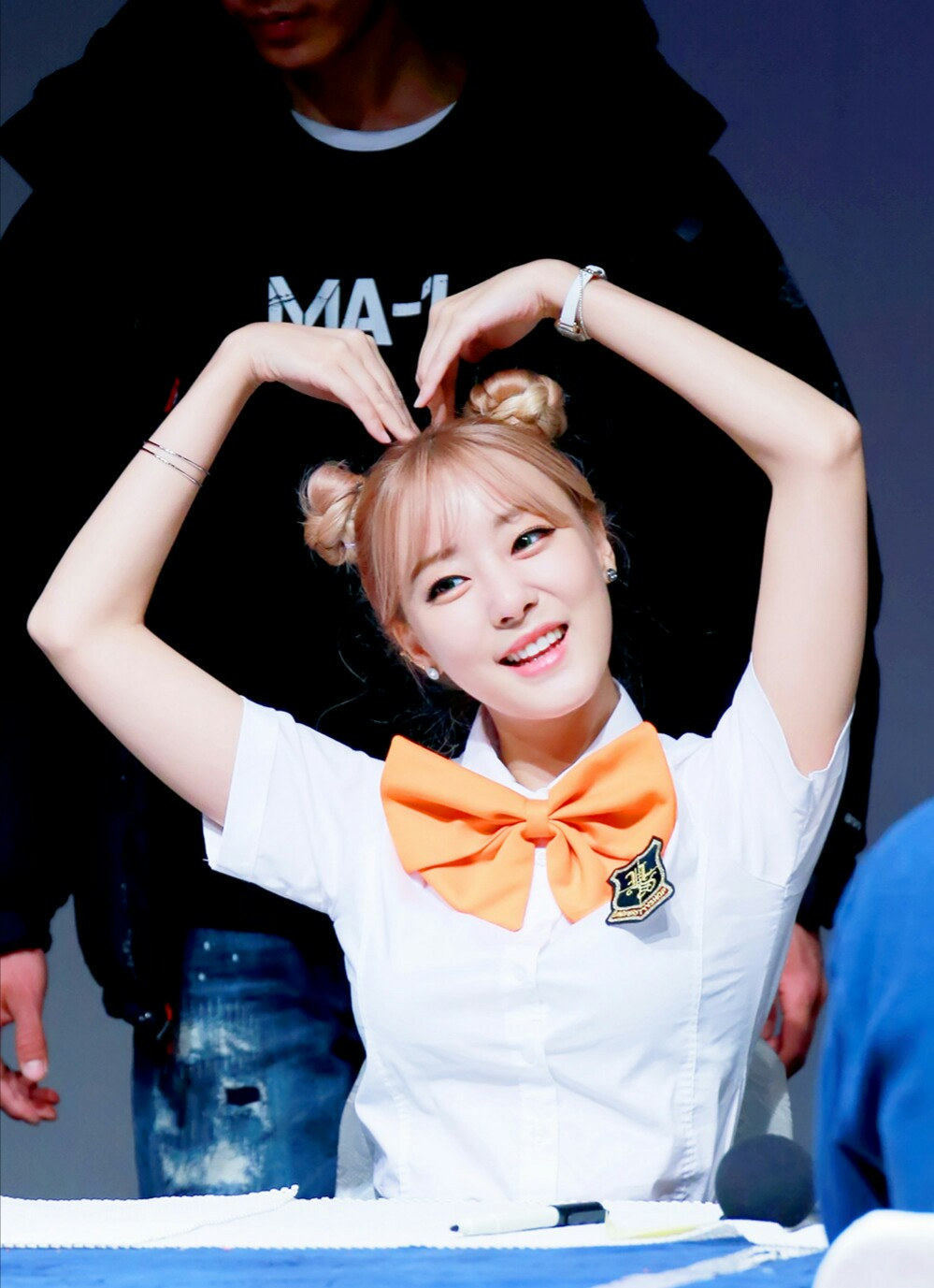
- Go in March 2016
- Born: Go Woo-ri; February 22, 1988 (age 38); Jeonju, South Korea
- Other name: Go Na-eun
- Education: Korea National Sport University
- Occupations: Singer; rapper; actress
- Agent: Image9coms
- Spouse: Unknown (m. 2022)
- Musical career
- Genre: K-pop
- Instrument: Vocals
- Years active: 2009–present
- Label: DSP
- Member of: Rainbow18
- Formerly of: Rainbow; Rainbow Blaxx; DSP Friend

Korean name
- Hangul: 고우리
- RR: Go Uri
- MR: Ko Uri

Other name
- Hangul: 고나은
- RR: Go Naeun
- MR: Ko Naŭn

Go Woo-ri (Korean: 고우리; born February 22, 1988), better known by the mononym Woori or as Go Na-eun (고나은) is a South Korean singer, rapper and actress. She was a member of the South Korean girl group Rainbow and its sub-group, Rainbow Blaxx.

== Early life ==
Go Woo-ri was born in Jeonju, South Korea on February 22, 1988. She studied at Daejeon Arts High School and Korea National Sport University. She was formerly a trainee at SM Entertainment before switching to DSP Media.

== Career ==
=== 2009–2016: Activities as Rainbow and Rainbow Blaxx ===
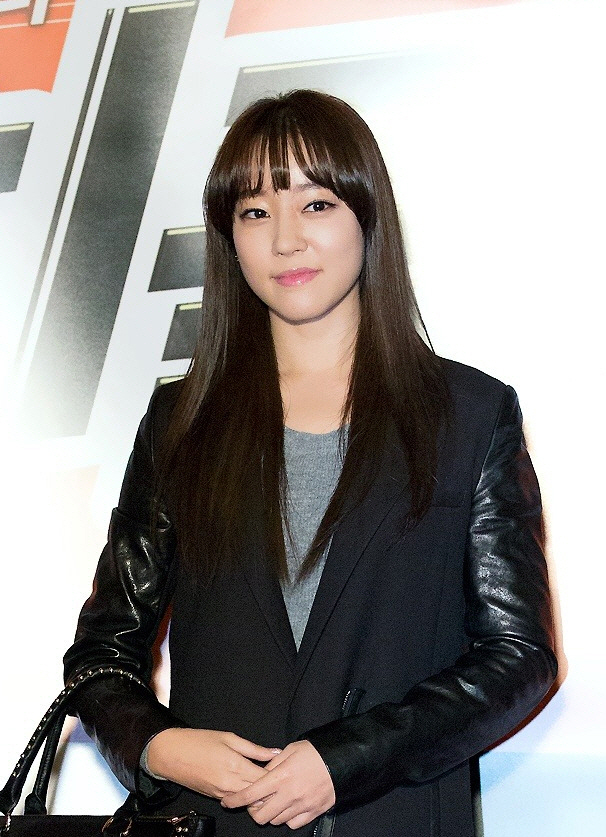
Go in 2012

On November 12, 2009, Go debuted as the main rapper of the girl group Rainbow with the release of extended play Gossip Girl.

In January 2014, DSP announced Go, alongside member Jaekyung, Seungah, and Hyunyoung, would form Rainbow's second sub-unit. On January 20, 2014, the sub-unit named Rainbow Blaxx debut with the release of extended play RB Blaxx.

On October 27, 2016, DSP announced Rainbow would disband on November 12 as the members contract were to expire. The group released seven EPs and two studio albums while active.

=== 2010–present: Activities as an actress ===
In 2010, Go made her debut as an actress in the film Heartbeat. The following year, she was cast in the film You're My Pet and in the second season of Invincible Youth.

On February 27, 2012, she made her drama debut in KBS2's I Need a Fairy. In 2013, she was cast in The Clinic for Married Couples: Love and War and made a cameo in Reply 1994. She was then cast as a supporting character in the dramas Glorious Day (2014) and Flower of Queen (2015). In 2016, she landed her first starring role in Start Again.

On January 10, 2018, it was announced that she changed her stage name to Go Na-eun. That year, she was cast in Yeonnam-dong 539, the horror film The Whispering, and My Only One.

In 2019, she was cast in Love in Sadness and changed her stage name back to Go Woo-ri in November. In 2020, she was cast in True Beauty, while in 2021, she appeared in Hello, Me!.

== Personal life ==
In June 2022, Go's agency confirmed her relationship with a businessman. Later in August, it was announced that they were engaged. They got married on October 3, 2022, in presence of friends and family in Seocho District, Seoul.

On April 2, 2026, Go announced her pregnancy after 3 years and 7 months of marriage through her Instagram account.

== Filmography ==
=== Film ===
Year	Title	Role	Notes	Ref.
2010	Heartbeat		Cameo	
2011	You're My Pet	Lee Min-seon		
2018	The Whispering			
TBA	Animal Period of Escape	Yu Mi-ra		

=== Television series ===
Year	Title	Role	Notes	Ref.
2012	I Need a Fairy	Go Ria		
2013	Reply 1994	"Uhm Jung-hwa" of Yonsei University	Cameo	
2013	The Clinic for Married Couples: Love and War	Go Eun		
2014	Glorious Day	Jung Da-in		
2015	Flower of Queen	Seo Yoo-ra		
2016	Start Again	Lee Ye-ra		
2018	Yeonnam-dong 539	Seok Do-hee		
2018	My Only One	So Young-bae		
2019	Love in Sadness	Oh Cheol-young		
2020	Live On	Music teacher	Cameo	
2020–2021	True Beauty	Selena Lee		
2021	Hello, Me!	Bang Ok-joo		
2021	Mouse	Jennifer Lee	Cameo (Episode 9)	
2022	Gaus Electronics	Sung Hyeong-mi		

=== Web series ===
Year	Title	Role	Notes	Ref.
TBA	Mentalist	Ban Eun-hye		

=== Television show ===
Year	Title	Role	Notes	Ref.
2011–2012	Invincible Youth	Cast member	Season 2	
2016	Society Game	Contestant	Season 2	
2021	Celebrity Beauty	Host	Season 3	

== Ambassadorship ==
- Help Animals Ambassador, Animal Protection Group (2022)
