= Charlie Peace (novel) =

1991 comic novel by Paul Pickering

- First edition
- Author: Paul Pickering
- Language: English
- Genre: Fiction, Literary Fiction
- Publisher: Random House
- Publication date: 1991
- Publication place: United States
- Media type: Print (Hardback), (Paperback)
- Pages: 301
- ISBN: 0-394-58544-5

Charlie Peace is the controversial comic novel by British writer Paul Pickering. It was published in the United States by Random House but not in the United Kingdom because of fears of Christian blasphemy prosecutions against the background of The Satanic Verses controversy.

== Plot summary ==
The criminal Jack Peachey seeks to find his own sense of humanity in the extraordinary stories Charlie Peace told him as a boy. He wants to imagine a Christ who reflects his own image and understanding.

== Reception ==
The book received favourable reviews in the USA. Publishers Weekly called the novel ‘A bizarre, wildly surreal fantasy that lampoons Christianity and organised religion ... makes Salvador Dali’s psychospiritual rantings look tame.’ The novel not being published in the UK led to Pickering leaving his then publishers Chatto & Windus. The row led The Sunday Times to call Pickering the ‘de facto Norman Mailer of the British literati’ and J. G. Ballard said the book was ‘very entertaining while being genuinely subversive ... not to publish it in Britain is pure censorship.’
