= Mach (song) =

2010 single by Rainbow

- Digital cover

Single by Rainbow
- Released: October 20, 2010
- Recorded: 2010
- Genre: Dance-pop; K-pop
- Length: 3:11
- Label: DSP Media
- Songwriters: Song Soo Yoon; Han Jae Ho; Kim Seung Soo

Rainbow singles chronology
| "A" (2010) | "Mach" (2010) | "To Me" (2011) |

"Mach" is a song by South Korean girl group Rainbow. The song was released on 20 October 2010, and was later included on their second mini album So Girls. The song is also the group's second Japanese single. It was released on 7 December 2011 in 4 different versions: 3 limited editions (CD+DVD, CD + 28-pages photobook and CD Only + Bonus track) and a regular edition.

Professional ratings
Review scores
| Source | Rating |
|---|---|
| IZM | 3/5 stars |

== Korean version ==
=== Background ===
A teaser photo with the concept of the song was released in 18 October. The song was released to follow up the promotions of the song "A". This version does not have a music video.

=== Track listing ===
All music is composed by Han Jae Ho and Kim Seung Soo.

Korean digital single:
| No. | Title | Lyrics | Music | Length |
|---|---|---|---|---|
| 1. | "Mach" (마하; Maha) | Song Soo Yoon | Han Jae-Ho, Kim Seung Soo | 3:11 |
| 2. | "Mach" (Instrumental) | | Han Jae-Ho, Kim Seung Soo | 3:11 |
| Total length: | | | | 6:22 |

=== Composition ===
The song was produced by Sweetune (Han Jae Ho and Kim Seung Soo) and written by Song Soo Yun, who also produced their previous single "A".

=== Chart performance ===
==== South Korea ====
The song debuted at number 38 in the first week and climbed to the number 19 on the following week, which is currently the highest peak of the song. The song ranked at number 193 on Gaon's Yearly chart with 216,200,537 points and with 925,573 digital copies sold.

=== Korean version ===
| Chart (2010) | Peak position |
|---|---|
| Gaon Weekly singles | 19 |
| Gaon Monthly singles | 26 |
| Gaon Yearly singles | 193 |

== Japanese version ==
"Mach (マッハ)"
- Regular edition cover

Single by Rainbow

from the album Over the Rainbow
- B-side: "Not Your Girl"; "Mach" (Korean)
- Released: December 7, 2011
- Recorded: 2011
- Genre: Dance-pop
- Length: 3:12
- Label: Universal Sigma
- Songwriters: Song Soo-yun; Han Jae Ho; Kim Seung Soo; Natsumi Watanabe; Yu Shimoji; NICE73; Han Jae Ho; Kim Seung Soo

Rainbow singles chronology
| "A" (2011) | "Mach (マッハ)" (2011) | "Hoi Hoi" (2012) |

The Japanese version follows the same concept of the Korean version. A teaser of the music video was released on 15 November 2011, on Universal Music Japan's YouTube account. The full music video premiered on 21 November on the TV station Space Shower TV.

=== Composition ===
the lyricist of Japanese version : Natsumi Watanabe, Yu Shimoji and NICE73. The B-side is a Japanese version of the song "Not Your Girl", previously released in Korean, on their debut EP Gossip Girl.

=== Chart performance ===
==== Japan ====
The physical single debuted at the number 9 on Oricon's weekly chart with 15,506 copies sold in the first week.

=== Track listing ===
Japanese single:
| No. | Title | Lyrics | Music | Length |
|---|---|---|---|---|
| 1. | "Mach" (マッハ; Maha) | Song Soo-yun, Han Jae Ho, Kim Seung Soo, Natsumi Watanabe, Yu Shimoji, NICE73 | Han Jae Ho, Kim Seung Soo | 3:11 |
| 2. | "Not Your Girl" (ノット ユア ガール; Notto Yua Gāru) | Han Sang Won, Shihomi, NICE73 | Han Sang Won | 3:27 |
| 3. | "Mach" (Instrumental) | | Han Jae Ho, Kim Seung Soo | 3:12 |
| Total length: | | | | 9:50 |

Type C - Bonus track
| No. | Title | Lyrics | Music | Length |
|---|---|---|---|---|
| 4. | "Mach" (Korean version) | Song Soo Yoon | Han Jae Ho, Kim Seung Soo | 3:11 |
| Total length: | | | | 13:01 |

DVD (Limited Edition - Type A)
| No. | Title | Length |
|---|---|---|
| 1. | "Mach" (Music video) |
| 2. | "Mach" (Music video - Dance version) |
| 3. | "Mach" (Music video - Behind the scenes) |

=== Charts ===
==== Oricon ====
| Released | Oricon Chart | Peak | Debut sales | Sales total |
|---|---|---|---|---|
| 7 December 2011 | Daily Singles Chart | 7 | 15,506 | 21,984 |
| 7 December 2011 | Weekly Singles Chart | 9 | 15,506 | 21,984 |
| 7 December 2011 | Monthly Singles Chart | 39 | 15,506 | 21,984 |

==== Other charts ====
| Chart | Peak position |
|---|---|
| Billboard Japan Hot 100 | 15 |
| RIAJ Digital Track Chart weekly top 100 | 69 |

== Release history ==
| Country | Date | Format | Label |
|---|---|---|---|
| South Korea | 20 October 2010 | Digital download, Promotional single | DSP Media |
| Japan | 7 December 2011 | CD single, Digital download | Universal Sigma |
