= Hoi Hoi =

- Left to right: Jisook, Hyunyoung and Seungah

Single by Rainbow Pixie
- Released: January 12, 2012
- Recorded: 2011
- Genre: Dance-pop, K-pop
- Length: 3:18
- Label: DSP Media
- Songwriter: Haylie
- Producers: Park Se Hyun, Blacc Hole

Rainbow Pixie singles chronology
"Mach" (2011)	"Hoi Hoi" (2012)	"Gonna Gonna Go!" (2012)

"Hoi Hoi" (호이 호이) is a song released by South Korean sub-unit trio Rainbow Pixie. It is the debut single of the unit. The song was released on January 12, 2012.

== Background ==
On January 3, it was revealed by their agency, DSP Media, that a unit of the group will be formed as a trio. On the same day, a teaser image was revealed on DSP Media's website with the name of the unit, called "Rainbow Pixie". On January 4, another image was revealed with the members of the group, the unit is composed of SeungAh, Jisook and HyunYoung. It was also announced the release date of the single for January 12. To describe the concept of the single, DSP Media stated “‘Pixie’ will present a cute and fun stage from the members that were usually hard to see regularly on TV.” On January 5, the jacket cover of the single was revealed.

On February 15, it was announced the song will serve as a bonus track for Rainbow's third Japanese single "Gonna Gonna Go!".

== Composition ==
The song was composed by Haylie and produced by Park Se Hyun and Blacc Hole. Park Se Hyun also produced the song "Sweet Dream", from the mini album with same name of Rainbow.

== Music video ==
A first teaser of the music video was revealed on January 4, 2012, with a teaser of the song, a second teaser was revealed four days after, on January 8. The full music video was released on January 12, along with the release of the single digitally. To help promote the song, DSP Media released two "No-Goods" version of the music video, the first on January 17 and the second on January 25, although the second does not have sound.

== Promotions ==
The unit debuted on January 14, on MBC's Music Core. They also promoted the song on the shows Inkigayo, M! Countdown and K-Pop Con. The promotions ended on February 12, on Inkigayo.

== Track listing ==
Digital single:

1. "Hoi Hoi" (호이 호이) – 3:18
2. "Hoi Hoi" (Instrumental) – 3:18

== Chart performance ==
The song debuted at number 41 in Gaon's Weekly chart on the week of January 21 with 7,629,539 points. It climbed six positions on the following week and stayed in the position for two consecutive weeks. At the date, it is the highest peak of the song.

=== Charts ===
Chart (2012)	Peak position
South Korea Gaon Weekly singles	35
South Korea Gaon Monthly singles	47
South Korea Gaon Mid-Year singles	148
South Korea Gaon Mid-Year domestic singles	124
South Korea Billboard Korea K-Pop Hot 100	35

== Release history ==
Country	Date	Format	Label
South Korea	January 12, 2012	Digital download, Promotional single	DSP Media
Worldwide	January 12, 2012	Digital download	DSP Media
Japan	March 14, 2012	CD single (Gonna Gonna Go! bonus track)	Universal Sigma
