= So Girls =

- So Girls digital cover

EP by Rainbow
- Released: April 8, 2011
- Recorded: Seoul, South Korea; 2011
- Genre: K-pop, dance-pop
- Length: 20:58
- Label: DSP Entertainment
- Producer: Daishi Dance, Steven Lee

Rainbow chronology
Gossip Girl (2009)	So Girls (2011)	Over the Rainbow (2012)

Singles from So Girls
- 1. "To Me" Released: April 8, 2011

Alternative Cover
- Sweet Dream re-release cover

Singles from Sweet Dream
- 1. "Sweet Dream" Released: June 22, 2011

So Girls (SO 女, So Nyeo) is the second EP by the South Korean girl group Rainbow. It was released in South Korea on April 8, 2011 with "To Me" as the title track. A repackaged version of the EP was released on June 22, 2011 with the song "Sweet Dream" as the title track.

== History ==
The cover photo for the album (and the overall concept) was spring, with the girls being photographed in white dresses while standing in a field of flowers. The tracks on their album were referred to as "luxurious, mature, feminine and sexy".

Rainbow released the teaser for their single "To Me" on April 4, 2011. The EP was released on music stores and digital music sites on April 7, 2011. The official music video was unveiled on the same day.

The song was written and produced by Daishi Dance, who produced Big Bang's hit track “Haru Haru”, and has experience producing for some of Japan's biggest names, including Ayumi Hamasaki, SMAP, and Mika Nakashima.

Some parts of the choreography were reportedly adapted from the international box office hit, “Black Swan“; and was performed by member Go Woori during the bridge.

=== Repackaging release ===
On June 22, 2011, Rainbow released a re-packaged version of their second mini-album, “To Me“, which included a new track titled “Sweet Dream”.

Rainbow released the teaser for their single "Sweet Dream" on June 20, 2011. The EP was released on music stores and digital music sites on June 22, 2011. The official music video was unveiled on the same day. The mini-album also included a new version of "Kiss", originally included on their first mini-album Gossip Girl.

On July 1, 2011 Rainbow released rehearsal video for their track, “Sweet Dream”.

== "To Me" music video ==
It is about a girl played by Woori who finds out her true love has been seeing another women. The members are seen putting makeup and dressing up during their verses, it also alternates in between a parking lot and a boxing ring. In the end the girls spray paint the cheating lover car with the 7 colors of rainbow. It was revealed later that the guy who betrays Woori on the music video is Hyeongkon, member of the boy band A-JAX, and the other woman is former GFriend member Kim So-jeong.

== Promotion ==
Rainbow had their comeback stage with "To Me" on Music Bank on April 8, 2011. The group also performed "To Me" on various music shows such as M Countdown, Music Core and Inkigayo in April.

Rainbow had their comeback stage with "Sweet Dream" on M Countdown on June 23, 2011. The group also performed "Sweet Dream" on various music shows such as Music Bank, Show! Music Core and Inkigayo in June and July.

== Track listing ==
No.	Title	Lyrics	Music	Length
1.	"So Cool"	Lee Seung Jae	Steven Lee, Sean Alexander, Drew Ryan Scott	3:17
2.	"To Me" (내게로..; Naegero..)	N-Sun, Double K	Daishi Dance, A.I.P	3:56
3.	"I Said You're The One" (너뿐 이라고; Neoppun Irago)	Kim Boa	Lee Joohyung	3:18
4.	"Mach"	Song Soo Yun	Han Jae-Ho, Kim Seung Soo	3:11
5.	"A"	Song Soo Yun	Han Jae-Ho, Kim Seung Soo	3:21
6.	"To Me" (Instrumental)		Daishi Dance	3:56
Total length:				20:58

=== Sweet Dream ===
No.	Title	Lyrics	Music	Length
1.	"Sweet Dream"	Gil Hak Mi, Double K	Park Se Hyun, Daishi Dance, A.I.P	3:31
2.	"Kiss" (Acoustic Ver.)	Kim Bo-Ah, Park Jung Min	Lee Joohyung	3:11
3.	"To Me"	N-Sun, Double K	Daishi Dance, A.I.P	3:56
4.	"To Me" (Club Ver.)	N-Sun, Double K	Daishi Dance, A.I.P	6:12
5.	"Sweet Dream" (Instrumental)		Park Se Hyun, Daishi Dance, A.I.P	3:31
Total length:				20:11

== Controversy ==
=== "Ab dance" ===
One month after beginning promotions for the song "A", the "belly dance" or "ab dance" featured in the music video and choreography of the song was banned from broadcast and rated +19, due to being "too sexually suggestive". The girls slowly lift up their shirts to expose their stomach in the choreography. Despite the controversy, the song was released in Japan on September 14, 2011 as their Japanese debut single.

== Charts ==
=== To Me/So Girls ===
Chart	Peak position
Gaon Weekly Singles chart	5
Gaon Yearly Singles chart	64
Gaon Local Singles chart	5
Gaon Streaming Singles chart	1
Gaon Download Singles chart	4
Gaon BGM chart	34
Gaon Mobile Ringtone chart	21
Gaon Karaoke chart	-

=== Album chart ===
Chart	Peak position
Gaon Weekly album chart	3
Gaon Yearly album chart	70

=== Sales ===
Chart	Sales
Gaon physical sales	26,900+

=== Singles ===
Title	Peak chart positions
Title	KOR
"A"	9
"Mach"	19
"To Me"	5
"Sweet Dream"	8

=== Other charted songs ===
Title	Peak chart positions
Title	KOR
"So Cool"	104
"I Said You're The One"	111

=== Total Sales ===
Chart	Sales
Gaon physical sales	39,400+
Oricon physical sales	1,450+

=== Sweet Dream ===
Chart	Peak position
Gaon Weekly Singles chart	8
Gaon Yearly Singles chart	176
Gaon Local Singles chart	8
Gaon Streaming Singles chart	12
Gaon Download Singles chart	7
Gaon BGM chart	49
Gaon Mobile Ringtone chart	-
Gaon Karaoke chart	-

=== Album chart ===
Chart	Peak position
Gaon Weekly album chart	6

=== Sales ===
Chart	Sales
Gaon physical sales	12,500+

== Release history ==
Version	Country	Date	Distributing label	Format
So Girls	South Korea	April 8, 2011	CJ E&M; DSP Media	CD
Sweet Dream	South Korea	June 21, 2011	CJ E&M; DSP Media	CD
