= Over the Rainbow (Rainbow EP) =

- Digital download cover

Single album by Rainbow
- Released: November 14, 2019
- Recorded: 2019
- Studio: DSP Media
- Genre: K-pop; R&B; ballad
- Label: DSP; Kakao M

Rainbow chronology
Prism (2016)	Over the Rainbow (2019)

Singles from Over the Rainbow
- 1. "Aurora" Released: November 14, 2019

Over the Rainbow is the fifth extended play by South Korean girl group, Rainbow. It was released on November 14, 2019, by DSP Media and distributed by Kakao M, to celebrate the group's tenth anniversary of debut. The album marked Rainbow's first release since their disbandment on October 27, 2016.

== Background and release ==
On October 27, 2016, DSP Media announced that Rainbow would be disbanding due to their contract expiration on November 12. However, Jisook stated in an interview in 2018 that the members had maintained contact and believed that they would be able to eventually make a comeback.

On October 31, 2019, it was confirmed that the members of Rainbow would release a special tenth anniversary EP with all members participating in the comeback. The members each posted a group photo on Instagram, stating they were serious about returning to the industry.

The album title was confirmed to be "Over the Rainbow," on November 5, with the first single "I Dream of You," releasing at 6 PM KST. The album released on November 14, alongside the MV for Aurora.

== Track listing ==
No.	Title	Length
1.	"I Dream of You"	4:08
2.	"Aurora"	3:15
3.	"I Dream of You" (Inst.)	4:08
4.	"Aurora" (Inst.)	3:15
