= Gossip Girl (EP) =

- Digital cover

EP by Rainbow
- Released: November 12, 2009
- Recorded: Seoul, South Korea; 2009
- Genre: K-pop, dance-pop
- Length: 16:33
- Label: DSP Media

Rainbow chronology
Gossip Girl (2009)	So Girls (2011)

Singles from Gossip Girl
- 1. "Gossip Girl" Released: November 12, 2009; 2. "Not Your Girl" Released: January 16, 2010

Gossip Girl is the debut EP by the South Korean girl group Rainbow. It was released on November 12, 2009 with the song with same name as title track.

== Background ==
DSP Media announced on November 4 they will debut a new 7-members girl group, called "Rainbow". On November 6, they released another teaser image of the girls and revealed their names, ages, respective colors and the name of their debut EP. On the same day, they released a screencap image of the music video for "Gossip Girl". During the debut time, they were called the "second KARA" due to both groups are signed on the same label. The music video for "Gossip Girl" was released on November 12, along with the EP release.

== Promotion ==
The group debuted on November 14, on the MBC's show Music Core. They also promoted on the shows KBS's Music Bank, SBS's Inkigayo and Mnet's M! Countdown. They followed the promotions of the EP with the song "Not Your Girl" on January 16, 2010. The promotions ended on February 21, on the show Inkigayo.

== Composition ==
The song "Gossip Girl" was produced by Hur Youn Won, "Not Your Girl" was produced by Han Sang Won and "Kiss" was composed by SS501's member Park Jung-min.

== Track listing ==
EP track list
No.	Title	Lyrics	Music	Length
1.	"Not Your Girl" ( (Note: This song was re-recorded in Japanese and released as a B-side of the single "Mach".))	Han Sang-won	Han Sang-won	3:26
2.	"Gossip Girl" ( (Note: This song was re-recorded in Japanese and released as a B-side of the single "A".))	Hur Youn-won	Hur Youn-won	3:06
3.	"I Believe"	Song Soo-yun, Han Jae-ho, Kim Seung-soo	Han Jae-ho, Kim Seung-soo	3:18
4.	"Kiss" ( (Note: An acoustic version of the song was released on the repackage edition of their second EP "So Girls".))	Kim Boa, Park Jung-min	Lee Joo-hyung	3:07
5.	"I Will Endure It" (참아볼께요; Chamabolkkeyo)	Oh Sung-hun	Oh Sung-hun	3:38
Total length:				16:33

== Charts ==
=== Album chart ===
Chart (2010) (Note: Gaon Chart was created after the release of the EP.)	Peak position
Gaon albums chart	2

=== Single chart ===
Title	Peak chart positions
Title	KOR
"Gossip Girl"	62
"Not Your Girl"	84

=== Other charted songs ===
Title	Peak chart positions
Title	KOR
"Kiss"	115

=== Sales ===
Chart	Sales
Gaon physical sales	15,000+ (South Korea)

== Release history ==
Country	Date	Distributing label	Format
South Korea	November 12, 2009	CJ E&M; DSP Media	CD, Digital download
