= List of Happy Together episodes =

The following is a list of episodes of the South Korean talk show Happy Together (해피투게더), broadcast on KBS2 every Thursday at 23:05 KST starting November 8, 2001. The show began airing in HD on March 17, 2011. Episodes are aired with English subtitles not only in episode reruns, but also episodes uploaded on KBS's official YouTube channel.

There were 179 episodes aired during Season 1, which ended on April 28, 2005. Season 2 was first released the pilot on February 14, 2005, then began officially airing on May 5, 2005, ended on June 21, 2007, and had 112 episodes. There were also 4 special episodes which aired between Season 1 and Season 2 on the traditional Korean holidays such as Chuseok, Seollal, or others festivals such as Thanksgiving and Christmas. Season 3 aired from July 5, 2007 to October 4, 2018, with 557 episodes. Season 4 aired from October 11, 2018 to April 2, 2020, with 77 episodes.

== Happy Together (2001–2005) ==
=== 2001 ===
List of episodes in 2001 (episodes 1 – 8)

Episode #	Date aired	Person corner	Guests	Person corner	Guests	Notes
Happy Together first broadcast
1	November 8, 2001	Probability Games "I Got Caught"	Sung Si-kyung, Uhm Jung-hwa, Ha Ji-won	Happy "Nip and Tuck" Battle	Paikyang High School	Shin Dong-yup and Yoo Seung-jun joined as hosts for the show
2	November 15, 2001	Happy "Nip and Tuck" Battle	Sunjung High School	Talk "I Got Caught"	Lee Sung-jin (NRG), Lee Ki-chan, Kangta	Special host: Im Chang-jung
3	November 22, 2001	WtS: Ulsan Lady (울산 아가씨)	Choi Jin-young, Hong Kyung-min, Lee Byung-jin	Happy "Nip and Tuck" Battle	Hanseo High School	
4	November 29, 2001	WtS: Oh Susanna (오! 수재너)	Lee Sung-jin (NRG), Lee Byung-jin, Jang Na-ra	Happy "Nip and Tuck" Battle	Inhun High School	Special host: Yoo Jae-suk
5	December 6, 2001	WtS: The Woman's Heart (여자의 마음)	V.ONE, Lee Byung-jin, Kim Hyun-jung	Happy "Nip and Tuck" Battle	Daeyoung High School	
6	December 13, 2001	WtS: Santa Claus is Coming to Town (Shin Dong-yup version) (산타할아버지 우리마을 오셨네)	Kang Byung-kyu, Shin Dong-wook (Goofy), Kim Jong-kook			
7	December 20, 2001	WtS: Roast Chestnuts (군밤타령)	Kim Sung-soo (Cool), Harisu, Lee Byung-jin	Happy "Nip and Tuck" Battle	Mapo High School	
8	December 27, 2001	WtS: La Cucaracha (라쿠카라차)	Lee Byung-jin, Lee Jung-hyun, Bae Ki-sung (CAN)	Happy "Nip and Tuck" Battle	Kim Han-saem, Yoon Young-sam	

=== 2002 ===
List of episodes in 2002 (episodes 9 – 60)

Episode #	Date aired	Person corner	Guests	Person corner	Guests	Notes
9	January 3, 2002	WtS: The Land of Hope (paragraph 2) (희망의 나라로)	Kim Jong-kook, Lee Sung-jin (NRG), Lee Ki-chan	Happy "Nip and Tuck" Battle	Kim Han-saem, Yoon Young-sam	
10	January 10, 2002	WtS: Song of the Ranch (목장의 노래)	Hong Kyung-min, Jang Na-ra, Kim Jin	Happy "Nip and Tuck" Battle	Click-B (Kim Sang-hyuk, Yoo Ho-seok)	
11	January 17, 2002	WtS: Old Black Joe (올드 블랙 죠)	Lee Hye-young, Jung Seon-hee, Kim Min-jung	Happy "Nip and Tuck" Battle	Click-B (Kim Sang-hyuk, Yoo Ho-seok)	
12	January 24, 2002	WtS: 'O sole mio (오! 나의 태양)	Kim Jang-hoon, Chae Jung-an, Shin Dong-wook (Goofy)	Happy "Nip and Tuck" Battle	Kim Sang-hyuk (Click-B), Yoon Young-sam	
13	January 31, 2002	WtS: My Old Kentucky Home (켄터키 옛집)	g.o.d (Kim Tae-woo, Danny Ahn, Joon Park, Son Hoyoung, Yoon Kye-sang)	Happy "Nip and Tuck" Battle	Dana, Rottyful Sky	Special host: Kim Tae-woo; Last episode of Yoo Seung-jun as host
14	February 7, 2002	WtS: Mournful Rain (구슬비)	Kang Ho-dong, Lee Soo-young, Seo Ji-young (S#arp)	Happy "Nip and Tuck" Battle	Rich, Joanne	Special host: Cha Tae-hyun
15	February 14, 2002	WtS: Swanee River (스와니 강)	Kang Byung-kyu, Gu Bon-seung, Kim Jong-kook	Happy "Nip and Tuck" Battle	Rich, Joanne	
16	February 21, 2002	WtS: Baby Goats (아기염소)	Uhm Jung-hwa, Kim Jong-kook, Lee Ji-hye (S#arp)	Happy "Nip and Tuck" Battle	Rich, Joanne	
17	February 28, 2002	WtS: Stars (별)	Bae Ki-sung (CAN), Yoon Jung-soo, Hong Jin-kyung	Happy "Nip and Tuck" Battle	Rich, Joanne	Special host: Kim Jang-hoon
18	March 7, 2002	WtS: A Maiden Taking Herbs (나물 캐는 처녀)	Shim Hyun-seop, Kang Sung-beom, Hwang Seung-hwan	Happy "Nip and Tuck" Battle	Rich, Joanne	
19	March 14, 2002	WtS: The Memories About Maggie (매기의 추억)	Kim Jong-kook, Song Eun-i, Chae Jung-an	Happy "Nip and Tuck" Battle	Youme, Iconiq (Sugar)	
20	March 21, 2002	WtS: Go Fishing (고기 잡이)	Fin.K.L (Lee Hyori, Ock Joo-hyun, Sung Yu-ri, Lee Jin)	Happy "Nip and Tuck" Battle	Youme, Iconiq (Sugar)	
21	March 28, 2002	WtS: Magnolia Flowers (목련화)	Kim Hak-cheol, Lee Soo-young, Kim Sang-hyuk (Click-B)	Happy "Nip and Tuck" Battle	Joanne, Iconiq (Sugar)	Special host: Choi Soo-jong
22	April 4, 2002	WtS: Flowers Ballad (꽃타령)	Lee Kye-in, Hwangbo (Chakra), Rich	Happy "Nip and Tuck" Battle	Joanne, Iconiq (Sugar)	
23	April 11, 2002	WtS: Longing My Sweetheart (동무생각)	Kim Jung-min, Kim Jong-kook, Shin Ji (Koyote)	Happy "Nip and Tuck" Battle	Joanne, Iconiq (Sugar)	Lee Hyori joined as host beside Shin Dong-yup; Special host: Choi Soo-jong
24	April 18, 2002	WtS: Black Cat Nero (검은 고양이 네로)	Lee Mi-sook, Kim Won-hee, Kim Min, Kim Hyun-soo	Happy "Nip and Tuck" Battle	Joanne, Iconiq (Sugar)	The guests at left promoted for Oollala Sisters
25	April 25, 2002	WtS: Cold Noodles (냉면)	Country Kko Kko (Tak Jae-hoon, Shin Jung-hwan), Kim Jae-duc (J-Walk)	Happy "Nip and Tuck" Battle	Joanne, Iconiq (Sugar)	
26	May 2, 2002	WtS: The Green Sea (초록 바다)	Huh Joon-ho, Lee Chang-hoon, Lee Won-jong	Happy "Nip and Tuck" Battle	Travis, Pe2ny	The guests at left co-starred in Four Toes
27	May 9, 2002	WtS: Miryang Arirang (밀양 아리랑)	Park Kyung-lim, Lee Ki-chan, Shim Tae-yoon	Happy "Nip and Tuck" Battle	Travis, Iconiq (Sugar)	
28	May 16, 2002	WtS: Traveler (여행자)	Im Chang-jung, Jung Tae-woo, Joanne	Happy "Nip and Tuck" Battle	Travis, Iconiq (Sugar)	
29	May 23, 2002	WtS: Golden Country (금강산)	Jung Joon-ho, Han Eun-jung, Jung Yoon-don	Happy "Nip and Tuck" Battle	Silryuk, Iconiq (Sugar)	
30	May 30, 2002	WtS: Santa Lucia (산타루치아)	Im Chang-jung, Lee Hye-young, Yang Dong-geun	Happy "Nip and Tuck" Battle	Silryuk, Iconiq (Sugar)	The guests at left promoted for Bet on My Disco
31	June 6, 2002	WtS: Win! A Virile Son of Korea (이기자 대한건아)	Jo Hyung-gi, Park Gwang-hyun, Park Ye-jin	Happy "Nip and Tuck" Battle	Silryuk, Ash	The guests at left promoted for Dig or Die
32	June 13, 2002	Way to School's Best 3 picked by viewers and netizens				
33	June 20, 2002	WtS: Growing Up (모두모두 자란다)	Kim Hyun-chul, Kang Byung-kyu, Eun Ji-won	Happy "Nip and Tuck" Battle	Rich, Silryuk, Iconiq (Sugar), Joanne	
34	June 27, 2002	Cheering World Cup	Chakra (Jung Ryeo-won, Eun), Iconiq (Sugar)	WtS: Battle Hymn of the Republic (조국찬가)	Hwangbo, Byun Jung-soo, Kim Sang-hyuk (Click-B)	
35	July 4, 2002	WtS: The Front Village (앞마을 순이)	Country Kko Kko (Tak Jae-hoon, Shin Jung-hwan), Lee Yoo-jin	Happy "Nip and Tuck" Battle	Iconiq (Sugar), J	
36	July 11, 2002	WtS: We Are Sprouts (새싹들이다)	Kang Susie, Yoo Chae-yeong, Lee Sung-jin (NRG)	Happy "Nip and Tuck" Battle	Iconiq (Sugar), J	
37	July 18, 2002	WtS: Robot Taekwon V (로보트 태권브이)	Choi Soo-jong, Kim Yoo-mi, Ha Ji-won	Happy "Nip and Tuck" Battle	Iconiq (Sugar), J	Two first guests at left co-starred in Man of the Sun
38	July 25, 2002	WtS: The Icicles (고드름)	Kang Ho-dong, Ahn Seon-young, Kang Yoo-kyung	Happy "Nip and Tuck" Battle	Jerome, Silryuk	
39	August 1, 2002	WtS: The Land of Hometown (고향땅)	Kim Hyung-ja, Lee Hyuk-jae, Rain	Happy "Nip and Tuck" Battle	As One (Lee Min, Crystal)	
40	August 8, 2002	WtS: Winter Night (겨울밤)	Jung Seon-hee, Sung Si-kyung, Iconiq (Sugar)	Happy "Nip and Tuck" Battle	As One (Lee Min, Crystal)	Summer Special
41	August 15, 2002	WtS: Boatman's Song (사공의 노래)	CAN (Bae Ki-sung, Lee Jong-won), Kim Hyun-jung	Happy "Nip and Tuck" Battle	As One (Lee Min, Crystal)	
42	August 22, 2002	WtS: Maem Maem (맴맴)	Cha Tae-hyun, Son Ye-jin, Lee Eun-ju	Happy "Nip and Tuck" Battle	Kim Isak (Isak N Jiyeon), Brian Joo (Fly to the Sky)	The guests at left promoted for Lovers' Concerto
43	August 29, 2002	WtS: Pine Tree (소나무)	Cool (Kim Sung-soo, Yuri, Lee Jae-hoon)	Happy "Nip and Tuck" Battle	As One (Lee Min, Crystal)	
44	September 5, 2002	WtS: Greener Pastures (푸른 목장)	Kim Bo-sung, Jung Woon-taek, Yoon Gi-won	Happy "Nip and Tuck" Battle	Jerome, Silryuk, As One (Lee Min, Crystal)	The guests at left promoted for Boss X File
45	September 12, 2002	WtS: Evening Primrose (달맞이)	Jo Young-nam, Yang Hee-eun, Lee Sung-mi			
46	September 19, 2002	WtS: Wild Goose (기러기)	Kang Byung-kyu, Lee Soo-young, Seo Ji-young (S#arp)	Happy "Nip and Tuck" Battle	Iconiq (Sugar), Lee Min (As One)	
47	September 26, 2002	WtS: Evergreen (푸르다)	Hong Kyung-in, Jung Joon, Lee Won-jong	Happy "Nip and Tuck" Battle	Iconiq (Sugar), Crystal (As One)	The guests at left promoted for Birth of a Man
48	October 3, 2002	WtS: Waiting for You to Come (님이 오시는지)	Yoon Jung-soo, Lee Eui-jeong, Kim Jung-hwa	Happy "Nip and Tuck" Battle	Iconiq (Sugar), Jerome	
49	October 10, 2002	WtS: Echo (메아리)	Im Ha-ryong, Shim Hyung-rae, Lee Bong-won	Happy "Nip and Tuck" Battle	Iconiq (Sugar), Annie	
50	October 17, 2002	WtS: Bells (종소리)	Jung Woong-in, Lee Ji-hye (S#arp), Iconiq (Sugar)	Happy "Nip and Tuck" Battle	Annie, Michael	
51	October 24, 2002	WtS: Sunshine Day (햇볕은 쨍쨍)	Kim Jo-han, Jang Na-ra, Rain	Happy "Nip and Tuck" Battle	Nip and Tuck Best 3	
52	October 31, 2002	WtS: Sad Trees (비목)	Lee Beom-soo, Kim Sun-a, Park Myeong-su	Happy "Nip and Tuck" Battle	Kim Min-hai, Travis	Two first guests at left promoted for Wet Dreams
53	November 7, 2002	WtS: Leaf Ship (나뭇잎 배)	Park Sang-myun, Kim Yoon-kyung (actress), Lee Jae-yong	Happy "Nip and Tuck" Battle	Jyanjyan, Annie	The guests at left promoted for Baby Alone
54	November 14, 2002	WtS: Callistephus (과꽃)	Kim Ae-kyung, Kim Wan-sun, Lee Sung-jin	Happy "Nip and Tuck" Battle	Silryuk, Annie	
55	November 21, 2002	WtS: My Day (나의 하루)	Im Hyun-sik, Im Baek-chun, Noh Sa-yeon	Happy "Nip and Tuck" Battle	Silryuk, Annie	
56	November 28, 2002	WtS: Thinking of Elder Brother (오빠 생각)	Yoo Jae-suk, Hong Rok-gi, Song Eun-i			
57	December 5, 2002	WtS: In the Memory of My Hometown (Hyun Jae-myung version) (고향 생각)	Park Jun-gyu, Im Chang-jung, Yoo Chae-yeong	Happy "Nip and Tuck" Battle	Eugene Park, Annie	The guests at left promoted for Sex Is Zero
58	December 12, 2002	WtS: Piggy Bank (저금통)	Yum Jung-ah, Ji Jin-hee, Shin Jung-hwan	Metal Tray Drama	Psy, Iconiq (Sugar)	Two first guests at left promoted for H
59	December 19, 2002	WtS: Look Out the Windows (Shin Dong-yup version) (창 밖을 보라)	Park Sang-min, Son Moo-hyun, Kim Hyun-chul	Happy "Nip and Tuck" Battle	Hwang Sung-hwan, Annie	
60	December 26, 2002	Scenes you want to see again Best 3				

=== 2003 ===
List of episodes in 2003 (episodes 61 – 111)

Episode #	Date aired	Person corner	Guests	Person corner	Guests	Notes
61	January 2, 2003	WtS: Half Moon (반달)	Lee Hyuk-jae, Lee Yoo-jin, Kim Jeong-hoon (UN)	Happy "Nip and Tuck" Battle	Danny, Hwang Sung-hwan	
62	January 9, 2003	WtS: The House Front (그 집 앞)	Psy, Lee Jung-hyun, Jo Mi-ryung	Happy "Nip and Tuck" Battle	As One (Lee Min, Crystal), Danny, Annie	
63	January 16, 2003	WtS: Winter Trees (겨울 나무)	Sung Si-kyung, Jang Na-ra, Park Hyo-shin	Happy "Nip and Tuck" Battle	As One (Lee Min, Crystal), Danny, Annie	
64	January 23, 2003	WtS: Mountain Wind, River Wind (산바람 강바람)	Kang Byung-kyu, Lee Soo-young, Iconiq (Sugar)	The Metal Tray Drama	Sung Si-kyung, BIN (LUV)	
65	January 30, 2003	WtS: Face (얼굴)	Kim Seung-soo, Choo So-young, Jung So-young	Happy "Nip and Tuck" Battle	Annie, Hwang Sung-hwan	
66	February 6, 2003	WtS: The Golden Rule (등대지기)	Kim Ho-jin, Chu Sang-mi, Lee Tae-ran	The Metal Tray Drama	Lee Hyuk-jae, Im Yoo-jin	The guests at left co-starred in Yellow Handkerchief
67	February 13, 2003	WtS: Mind That Wait (기다리는 마음)	Ahn Jae-mo, Shinhwa (Kim Dong-wan, Shin Hye-sung)	The Metal Tray Drama	Lee Ki-chan, Choo So-young	
68	February 27, 2003	WtS: Come Pick the Moon (달 따러 가자)	Ha Choon-hwa, Kim Mi-hwa, Kim Young-chul	The Metal Tray Drama	Shin Jung-hwan, Jo Jeong-rin	
69	March 6, 2003	WtS: Island Baby (섬집 아기)	Yoon Do-hyun, Kang San-ae, Namkoong Yeon	The Metal Tray Drama	Shin Jung-hwan, Jo Jeong-rin	
70	March 13, 2003	WtS: Spring Maiden (봄처녀)	Cha Seung-won, Sung Ji-ru, Park Ji-yoon	The Metal Tray Drama	Hwangbo (Chakra), Kim Heung-soo	Two first guests at left promoted for My Teacher, Mr. Kim
71	March 20, 2003	WtS: Drop Flower (방울꽃)	Lee Seung-yeon, Son Tae-young, Hwangbo (Chakra)	The Metal Tray Drama	Kang Byung-kyu, Seo Min-jung	
72	March 27, 2003	WtS: Twinkle Little Star (작은 별)	Lee Hwi-jae, Lee Hoon, Shim Eun-jin (Baby V.O.X)	The Metal Tray Drama	Seo Ji-won, Lee Soo-young	
73	April 3, 2003	WtS: Southern Village (남촌)	Park Joon-hyung, Jung Jong-cheol, Lee Jeong-soo	The Metal Tray Drama	Kim Gun-mo, Byul	
74	April 10, 2003	WtS: Whispering Hope (희망의 속삭임) + Night of Seongbul Temple (성불사의 밤)	Kim Gun-mo, Ahn Jae-wook, Lee Sung-jin (NRG)	The Metal Tray Drama	Choi Jung-won (UN), Jung Ryeo-won (Chakra)	
75	April 17, 2003	WtS: On the Seashore (바닷가에서)	Jang Na-ra, Park Jung-chul, Park Myeong-su	The Metal Tray Drama	Lee Sung-jin (NRG), Jang Na-ra	Two first guests at left promoted for Oh! Happy Day
76	April 24, 2003	WtS: When Spring Comes (봄이 오면)	Sa Mi-ja, Lee Hye-sook, Jung Seung-ho	The Metal Tray Drama	Kim Sang-hyuk (Click-B), Harisu	
77	May 1, 2003	WtS: Origami (종이접기)	Yoon Jong-shin, Lee Hyun-woo, Seo Min-jung	The Metal Tray Drama	Tak Jae-hoon, Lee Yoo-jin	
78	May 8, 2003	WtS: Green Grass of Home (푸른 잔디)	Park Sun-young, Lee Gwang-gi, Park Ye-jin	The Metal Tray Drama	Oh Jong-hyuk (Click-B), Shin Ji (Koyote)	The guests at left co-starred in Royal Story: Jang Hui-bin
79	May 15, 2003	WtS: Spring Breeze (봄바람)	Seo Jang-hoon, Tak Jae-hoon, Kim Je-dong	The Metal Tray Drama	Oh Jong-hyuk (Click-B), Shin Ji (Koyote)	
80	May 22, 2003	WtS: Rainbow (무지개)	Kangta, Choi Jung-won (UN), Se7en	The Metal Tray Drama	Shin Jung-hwan, Shim Eun-jin (Baby V.O.X)	
81	May 29, 2003	WtS: Swing (그네)	Park Mi-sun, Jo Hye-ryun, Song Eun-i	The Metal Tray Drama	Jung Tae-woo, Sa Kang	
82	June 5, 2003	WtS: Frog Went A-Courting (개구리 노총각)	Lee Hwi-jae, Lee Hyuk-jae, V.ONE	The Metal Tray Drama	Jung Tae-woo, Sa Kang	
83	June 12, 2003	WtS: Tiger's Birthday (산중호걸)	Cha Tae-hyun, Son Ye-jin, Shin Seung-hwan	The Metal Tray Drama	Bae Ki-sung (CAN), Park Jung-ah (Jewelry)	The guests at left promoted for Crazy First Love
84	June 19, 2003	WtS: Help Each Other (서로서로 도와가며)	Lee Jae-yong, Lee Won-jong, Won Sang-yeon	The Metal Tray Drama	Kim Je-dong, Yoo Chae-yeong	The guests at left co-starred in Go, Mom, Go!
85	June 26, 2003	WtS: Boating Song (뱃노래)	Kim Bo-sung, Kim Min-jong, Jo Sung-mo	The Metal Tray Drama	Jo Sung-mo, Kim Yoon-kyung (actress)	
86	July 3, 2003	WtS: Nostalgic Hill (그리운 언덕)	Cha Tae-hyun, Lee Yoo-jin, Kim Dong-sung	The Metal Tray Drama	Kim Jin, Kan Mi-youn (Baby V.O.X)	
87	July 10, 2003	WtS: Clementine (클레멘타인)	Uhm Jung-hwa, Lee Beom-soo, Kim Joo-hyuk	The Metal Tray Drama	Se7en, Jadu (The Jadu)	The guests at left promoted for Singles
88	July 17, 2003	WtS: Children's Marches (어린이 행진곡)	Yang Taek-jo, Yoon Mun-sik, Seo Soo-nam	The Metal Tray Drama	Iconiq (Sugar), MC Mong	
89	July 24, 2003	2003 First Half – Way to School Best 3				
90	July 31, 2003	WtS: Eagle Five Brothers (독수리 오형제)	Park Jung-ah (Jewelry), Eugene, Jadu (The Jadu)	The Metal Tray Drama	The Metal Tray Drama Best 5	
91	August 7, 2003	WtS: Pippi Longstocking (말괄량이 삐삐)	Cool (Kim Sung-soo, Yuri, Lee Jae-hoon)	The Metal Tray Drama	Im Chang-jung, Han Eun-jung	
92	August 14, 2003	WtS: In the Memory of My Hometown (Lee Eun-sang version) (고향 생각)	Kim Jin-soo, Jung Seon-hee, Kim Je-dong	The Metal Tray Drama	Lee Gwang-gi, Jo Jeong-rin	
93	August 21, 2003	WtS: Lullaby (자장가)	Lee Sung-jin (NRG), Kim Hyun-jung, Shin Ji (Koyote)	The Metal Tray Drama	Kang Byung-kyu, U;Nee	
94	August 28, 2003	WtS: Village of Flowers, Village of Birds (꽃동네 새동네)	Kim Seung-woo, Kim Jung-eun, Jo Jeong-rin	The Metal Tray Drama	Cool (Kim Sung-soo, Yuri)	Two first guests at left promoted for Spring Breeze
95	September 4, 2003	WtS: Autumn (가을)	Park Sang-min, Kim Kyung-ho, Lee Se-joon (Yurisangja)	The Metal Tray Drama	Kim Hyun-jung, Eun Ji-won	
96	September 11, 2003	WtS: Harvest Song (풍년가)	Lee Dong-gun, Rain, BIN (LUV)	The Metal Tray Drama	Lee Beom-soo, Shin Shin-ae	The guests at left co-starred in Sang Doo! Let's Go to School
97	September 18, 2003	WtS: Sunset (노을)	Pyo In-bong, Hong Rok-gi, Jo Eun-sook	The Metal Tray Drama	Park Myeong-su, Yoon Eun-hye (Baby V.O.X)	
98	September 25, 2003	WtS: Kkangkkang Gym (깡깡총 체조)	Tae Jin-ah, Eun Ji-won, Ock Joo-hyun	The Metal Tray Drama	Choi Jung-won (UN), Jung Seon-hee	
99	October 2, 2003	WtS: Balsam (봉숭아)	Yoon Do-hyun, Lee Jung-hyun, Kim C	The Metal Tray Drama	Kim Kyung-ho, Hwangbo (Chakra)	
100	October 9, 2003	100th Special – Highlights				
101	October 16, 2003	WtS: The Half Moon in the Afternoon (낮에 나온 반달)	Jo Young-nam, Yang Hee-eun, Lee Sung-mi			
102	October 23, 2003	WtS: Whales and Elephants (고래와 코끼리)	Park Joong-hoon, Jung Jin-young, Ryu Seung-soo	The Metal Tray Drama	Lee Ki-chan, Ock Joo-hyun	The guests at left promoted for Once Upon a Time in a Battlefield
103	October 30, 2003	WtS: Loreley (로렐라이)	Song Dae-kwan, Joo Hyun-mi, Moon Hee-ok	The Metal Tray Drama	Lee Ki-chan, Ock Joo-hyun	Last episode of Shin Dong-yup and Lee Hyori as hosts
104	November 6, 2003	WtS: Newlywed Bride (새 색시 시집가네)	Shin Dong-yup, Lee Hyori, Song Eun-i			Yoo Jae-suk and Kim Je-dong joined as hosts
105	November 13, 2003	WtS: Maruchi Arachi (마루치 아라치)	Kangta, Shin Hye-sung (Shinhwa), Lee Ji-hoon	Quiz Blitz – Kneel Yo!	Eun Ji-won, Annie	
106	November 20, 2003	WtS: Animal Farm (동물 농장)	Jung Joon-ho, Kim Hye-ri, Kim Hyo-jin	Quiz Blitz – Kneel Yo!	Andy (Shinhwa), Jadu (The Jadu)	The guests at left promoted for The Legend of the Evil Lake
107	November 27, 2003	WtS: Festival Fever (들놀이)	Jung Seon-hee, Rain, Park Ye-jin	Quiz Blitz – Kneel Yo!	Andy (Shinhwa), Jadu (The Jadu)	
108	December 4, 2003	WtS: Cloud (구름)	Kim Min-jong, Choi Sung-kook, Jin Jae-young	Quiz Blitz – Kneel Yo!	Kim Jong-min (Koyote), Seo Min-jung	The guests at left promoted for Crazy Assassins
109	December 11, 2003	WtS: The Barley Field (보리밭)	Hong Rok-gi, Kim Han-seok, Shin Jung-hwan	Quiz Blitz – Kneel Yo!	Kim Jong-min (Koyote), Seo Min-jung	
110	December 18, 2003	WtS: Daddy Likes Mom (아빠는 엄마를 좋아해)	Lee Seung-yuop, Yoon Do-hyun, Jang Na-ra	Quiz Blitz – Kneel Yo!	Shin Ji (Koyote), Jung Cheol	
111	December 25, 2003	WtS: Jingle Bells (Shim Hyung-rae version) (징글벨)	Kang Ho-dong, Eun Ji-won, Lee Soo-young	Quiz Blitz – Kneel Yo!	Kim C, Jo Jeong-rin	

=== 2004 ===
List of episodes in 2004 (episodes 112 – 163)

Episode #	Date aired	Person corner	Guests	Person corner	Guests	Notes
112	January 1, 2004	WtS: Sally the Witch (요술 공주 세리)	Sung Si-kyung, Pak Se-ri, Kim Jong-min (Koyote)	Quiz Blitz – Kneel Yo!	Sung Si-kyung, Jang Na-ra	
113	January 8, 2004	WtS: My Grandmother (우리 할머니)	Kim Jaewon, Ha Ji-won, Jeong Jun-ha	Quiz Blitz – Kneel Yo!	Sung Si-kyung, Jang Na-ra	Two first guests at left promoted for 100 Days with Mr. Arrogant
114	January 15, 2004	WtS: Eye (눈)	Kwon Sang-woo, Lee Jung-jin, Han Ga-in	Quiz Blitz – Kneel Yo!	Koo Jun-yup (Clon), Dana	The guests at left promoted for Once Upon a Time in High School
115	January 22, 2004	WtS: New Year's Day (설날)	Hwang Soo-kyung, Lee Ji-yeon, Kang Soo-jeong	Quiz Blitz – Kneel Yo!	Lee Hwa-seon, Song Eun-i	
116	January 29, 2004	WtS: See the Stars and the Moon (별 보며 달 보며)	Noh Joo-hyun, Wang Young-eun, Jadu (The Jadu)	Quiz Blitz – Kneel Yo!	Jung Ryeo-won (Chakra), Eun Ji-won	
117	February 5, 2004	WtS: Torna a Surriento (돌아오라 소렌토로)	Kim Yong man, Ji Suk-jin, Jo Hye-ryun	Quiz Blitz – Kneel Yo!	Jung Ryeo-won (Chakra), Eun Ji-won	
118	February 12, 2004	WtS: Puppy Collar Bell (바둑이 방울)	Kim Ha-neul, Kang Dong-won, Park Hye-kyung	Quiz Blitz – Kneel Yo!	Lee Ki-chan, Lee Ji-hyun (Jewelry)	Two first guests at left promoted for Too Beautiful to Lie
119	February 19, 2004	WtS: Footprint Shoes (구두 발자국)	Kim Jang-hoon, Jo Mi-ryung, Han Eun-jung	Quiz Blitz – Kneel Yo!	Lee Min-kyung (Diva), Im Ho	
120	February 26, 2004	WtS: My Little Brother (내 동생)	Jeong Jun-ha, Moon Cheon-sik, Lee Dong-wook	Quiz Blitz – Kneel Yo!	Jeong Jun-ha, BIN (LUV)	
121	March 4, 2004	WtS: Grandfather Mountain (산 할아버지)	Lee So-ra, Uhm Jung-hwa, Jung Seon-hee, Kim Joo-hyuk			
122	March 11, 2004	WtS: The Earth's Joy (땅 위의 기쁨)	Son Chang-min, Son Hyun-joo, Cho Jae-hyun	Quiz Blitz – Kneel Yo!	Kim Mi-yeon, Harisu	The guests at left promoted for Father and Son: The Story of Mencius
123	March 18, 2004	WtS: Oats Peas Beans and Barley Grow (밀과 보리가 자라네)	Kim So-hyun, Kim Jong-min (Koyote), So Yi-hyun	Quiz Blitz – Kneel Yo!	Kim Mi-yeon, Harisu	
124	March 25, 2004	WtS: Nerdy First Love (얼간이 짝사랑)	Kim Soo-ro, Lee Sung-jae, Park Sol-mi	Quiz Blitz – Kneel Yo!	Kim Jong-min (Koyote), Kim Bin-woo	The guests at left promoted for Dance with the Wind
125	April 1, 2004	WtS: Let's Welcome Spring (봄맞이 가자)	Lee Jin, So Yoo-jin, Han Ji-hye	Quiz Blitz – Kneel Yo!	Lee Hwa-seon, Park Joon-seok	
126	April 8, 2004	WtS: Happy Spring (즐거운 봄)	Lee Moon-se, Shin Seung-hun, Lee Ki-chan	Quiz Blitz – Kneel Yo!	Lee Hwa-seon, Park Joon-seok	
127	April 15, 2004	WtS: Csikós Post (크시코스의 우편마차)	Kim Young-ho, Kim Seon-kyung, Yoo Jun-sang	Quiz Blitz – Kneel Yo!	MC Mong, Ji Sang-ryeol	
128	April 22, 2004	WtS: Paul's Miraculous Adventure (이상한 나라의 폴)	Tony An, Seo Min-jung, Jeong Hyeong-don	Quiz Blitz – Kneel Yo!	Baby V.O.X (Yoon Eun-hye, Shim Eun-jin)	
129	April 29, 2004	WtS: Pretty Rose (어여쁜 장미)	Lee Ji-hoon, MC Mong, Shin Ji (Koyote)	Quiz Blitz – Kneel Yo!	Chakra (Hwangbo, Eun)	
130	May 6, 2004	WtS: So And (그래 그래서)	Yeo Woon-kay, Kim Cheong, Kyeon Mi-ri			The guests at left co-starred in Dal-rae's House
131	May 13, 2004	WtS: Moon (달) + A Song Is Joyful (노래는 즐겁다)	Yeon Jung-hoon, Kim Heung-soo, Cho Yeo-jeong	Quiz Blitz – Kneel Yo!	Best of Best	
132	May 20, 2004	WtS: I Wish to Live on Keumgang (금강에 살으리랏다)	Jeon Hye-jin, Ahn Jae-hwan, Byun Jeong-min	Love Is...	Lee Hyori	Special host: Tim; The guests at left co-starred in Beautiful Temptation
133	May 27, 2004	WtS: The Sun Is Rising (둥근 해가 떴습니다)	Lee Kyung-shil, Jo Hye-ryun, Ock Joo-hyun	Love Is...	Lee Hyori	
134	June 3, 2004	WtS: Monggeumpo Ballad (몽금포 타령)	Kim Jang-hoon, Yoon Jong-shin, Kim Won-hee	Love Is...	Lee Hyori	
135	June 10, 2004	WtS: Oh Ladies (아가씨들아)	Kim Jaewon, Chun Jung-myung, Tak Jae-hoon			Two first guests co-starred in Beijing, My Love
136	June 17, 2004	WtS: Home on the Range (언덕 위의 집)	Park Joong-hoon, Cha Tae-hyun, Han Eun-jung			They all promoted for Two Guys
137	June 24, 2004	WtS: Summer (여름)	Kim Heung-gook, Park Mi-sun, Kim Young-chul	Love Is...	Uhm Jung-hwa	
138	July 1, 2004	WtS: Galaxy Express 999 (은하철도 999)	Jang Na-ra, Yang Mi-ra, Lee Se-eun	Love Is...	Uhm Jung-hwa	
139	July 8, 2004	Way to School	Closing the first half of 2004			
140	July 15, 2004	WtS: Baby Cow (송아지)	Kang Dong-won, Jo Han-sun, Jadu (The Jadu)			Two first guests promoted for Temptation of Wolves
141	July 22, 2004	WtS: Gapdol and Gapsun (갑돌이와 갑순이)	Lee Hwi-jae, Lee Hyuk-jae, Lyn			
142	July 29, 2004	WtS: Summer Riverbank (여름 냇가) + White Clouds (흰 구름)	Kim Jong-kook, Park Eun-hye, MC Mong			
143	August 5, 2004	WtS: Kimchi Theme Song (김치주제가)	Kang San-ae, Yoon Do-hyun, Kim C			
144	August 12, 2004	WtS: Dancing Seagull (춤추는 갈매기)	Kang Byung-kyu, Lee Yoo-ri, Lee Ji-hyun (Jewelry)			
145	August 19, 2004	WtS: Happy Song (즐거운 노래)	Hong Soo-hyun, Namkoong Min, Kim Bin-woo, Shim Ji-ho			My Lovely Family Special
146	August 26, 2004	WtS: Home Sweet Home (즐거운 나의 집)	Joo Hyun, Soo Ae, Eugene, Oh Joo-eun			Two first guests promoted for A Family
147	September 2, 2004	WtS: Summer Vacation (여름 방학) + Ranches Along The Road (목장길 따라)	Lee Beom-soo, Ryu Seung-soo, Gong Yoo			They all promoted for Superstar Mr. Gam
148	September 9, 2004	WtS: Arirang Mokdong (아리랑 목동)	Cha Seung-won, Jang Seo-hee, Son Tae-young			They all promoted for Ghost House
149	September 16, 2004	WtS: Longing for Mt. Keumgangsan (그리운 금강산)	Kim Jong-kook, Hong Kyung-in, Eun Ji-won, Park Han-byul			
150	September 23, 2004	WtS: Seed (씨앗) + Rhythmic Instruments Song (리듬 악기 노래)	UN (Choi Jung-won, Kim Jeong-hoon), Han Ji-hye			
151	September 30, 2004	WtS: Mother Pig Baby Pig (엄마돼지아기돼지) + The Land of Hope (paragraph 1) (희망의 나라로)	Shinhwa (Eric Mun, Andy Lee, Shin Hye-sung, Jun Jin, Kim Dong-wan, Lee Min-woo)			
152	October 7, 2004	WtS: A Small World (작은 세상)	Se7en, Bada, Iconiq (Sugar)			
153	October 14, 2004	WtS: Mullet (숭어)	Rain, Kim Sung-soo, Han Eun-jung			Full House Special
154	October 21, 2004	WtS: Fly Fly Fly (윙윙윙)	Nam Hee-suk, Lee Hyuk-jae, Lee Soo-young			
155	October 28, 2004	WtS: My Beautiful Friend (아름다운 나의 벗)	Insooni, Park Sang-min, Kim Hyun-jung			
156	November 4, 2004	WtS: Tong Tong Tong (통통통)	Yum Jung-ah, Lee Ji-hoon, Ji Suk-jin			Two first guests promoted for Lovely Rivals
157	November 11, 2004	WtS: Full Moon (둥근 달) + Yeosu (여수)	Oh Ji-myung, Kim Heung-gook, Im Yoo-jin			They all promoted for Shit Up!
158	November 18, 2004	WtS: Neighborhood (이웃집 순이)	Yoon Kye-sang, Kim Min-jung, On Joo-wan			They all promoted for Flying Boys
159	November 25, 2004	WtS: 100 Great People Who Shined Korea (paragraph 2) (한국을 빛낸 100명의 위인들)	Jo Hye-ryun, Tony An, Jung Ryeo-won (Chakra)			
160	December 2, 2004	WtS: Morning (아침)	Lee Seung-hwan, Kim Jung-hwa, Yurisangja (Park Seung-hwa, Lee Se-joon)			
161	December 9, 2004	WtS: La La La (라라라)	Kang Ho-dong, Shin Jung-hwan, Eun Ji-won, Yoon Eun-hye			
162	December 16, 2004	WtS: The Birds Singing a Morning Song (산새가 아침을)	g.o.d (Joon Park, Son Hoyoung, Danny Ahn, Kim Tae-woo)			
163	December 23, 2004	WtS: Rudolph the Red-Nosed Reindeer (Shim Hyung-rae version) (루돌프 사슴코)	Ahn Shi-hyun, Tak Jae-hoon, Chun Jung-myung, Lee Jae-hoon (Cool)			

=== 2005 ===
List of episodes in 2005 (episodes 164 – 179)

Episode #	Date aired	Person corner	Guests	Person corner	Guests	Notes
164	January 6, 2005	Smash Rock-Paper-Scissors	MC Mong, Choi Jung-won (UN), Kim Jong-kook, Lyn, Rain, Tak Jae-hoon, Lee Hwi-jae, Koyote (Shin Ji, Kim Jong-min, Bbaek Ga), Shinhwa (Eric Mun, Andy Lee, Shin Hye-sung, Jun Jin, Kim Dong-wan, Lee Min-woo)			Second Half of 2004 – Way to School Best Broadcasting
165	January 13, 2005	WtS: It's Okay (괜찮아요)	Choi Min-soo, Ock Joo-hyun, Lee Yoon-ji	Do Re Mi Kong Kong Kong	Lee Hyuk-jae, Ock Joo-hyun, Kim Jong-min, Seo Ji-young, Haengsung	
166	January 20, 2005	WtS: Mountain Rabbit (산토끼) + With the Mountains (들로 산으로)	Jung Han-yong, Lee Bo-hee, Kim Hong-sik	Do Re Mi Kong Kong Kong	Lee Hyuk-jae, Ock Joo-hyun, Kim Jong-min, Seo Ji-young, Haengsung	
167	January 27, 2005	WtS: Sweet 18 (낭랑 18세)	Lee Dong-gun, Han Ji-hye, Lee Hyuk-jae	Do Re Mi Kong Kong Kong	Hong Kyung-min, Kim Jong-min, Lee Jin, Hwayobi, Haengsung	Two first guests at left promoted for My Boyfriend Is Type B
168	February 3, 2005	WtS: The Third Daughter of Mr. Choi (최진사댁 셋째 딸)	Kim Chang-sook, Kang Boo-ja, Kim Bin-woo	Do Re Mi Kong Kong Kong	Hong Kyung-min, Kim Jong-min, Lee Jin, Hwayobi, Haengsung	The guests at left co-starred in My Lovely Family
169	February 17, 2005	WtS: Jjarappappa (짜라빠빠)	Im Chang-jung, DJ DOC (Kim Chang-ryul, Jung Jae-yong), Kim Hyun-jung	Do Re Mi Kong Kong Kong	Shin Jung-hwan, Lee Jin, Kim Hyun-jung, Ahn Sang-tae, Haengsung	
170	February 24, 2005	WtS: Stone and Water (돌과 물) + The Young Musicians (어린 음악대)	Lee Chang-hoon, Kim Seung-soo, Lee Bo-young, Oh Joo-eun	Do Re Mi Kong Kong Kong	Shin Jung-hwan, Lee Jin, Kim Hyun-jung, Ahn Sang-tae, Haengsung	The guests at left co-starred in Sweet Heart, Sweet Darling
171	March 3, 2005	WtS: Cheer Up, Dad (아빠 힘내세요)	Yeo Woon-kay, Kim Eul-dong, Lee Jung-jin, Lee Moon-sik	Do Re Mi Kong Kong Kong	Tony An, Yoon Eun-hye (Baby V.O.X), Jung Jae-yong (DJ DOC), Chun Myung-hoon (NRG), Hong Soo-ah	The guests at left promoted for Mapado
172	March 10, 2005	WtS: Spring (봄)	Eun Ji-won, Lee Jin, Lee Jong-soo, Kim Je-in	Do Re Mi Kong Kong Kong	Tony An, Yoon Eun-hye (Baby V.O.X), Jung Jae-yong (DJ DOC), Chun Myung-hoon (NRG), Hong Soo-ah	
173	March 17, 2005	Way to School	Jo Sung-mo, Hong Kyung-min, Tei, Chae Yeon	Do Re Mi Kong Kong Kong	Chun Myung-hoon (NRG), Lee Jin, Yoon Eun-hye (Baby V.O.X), Kim Bin-woo, Kim Jin	
174	March 24, 2005	WtS: March (행진)	Jo Sung-mo, Hong Kyung-min, Tei, Chae Yeon	Do Re Mi Kong Kong Kong	Chae Yeon, Tim, Tablo (Epik High), Chun Myung-hoon (NRG), Hyun Young	
175	March 31, 2005	WtS: Sing Together (다같이 노래를)	Ahn Sang-tae, Yoo Se-yoon, Jang Dong-min, Kang Yoo-mi	Do Re Mi Kong Kong Kong	Bae Ki-sung (CAN), Choi Hyun-ho, Tablo (Epik High), Sa Kang, U;Nee	
176	April 7, 2005	WtS: Spring-coming Road (봄이 오는 길)	Go Doo-shim, Kim Yu-seok, Lee Hye-eun	Do Re Mi Kong Kong Kong	Bae Ki-sung (CAN), Choi Hyun-ho, Tablo (Epik High), Sa Kang, U;Nee	The guests at left promoted for Long & Winding Road
177	April 14, 2005	WtS: Dokdo Is Our Territory (독도는 우리 땅)	Jinusean (Jinu, Sean), Tim, Tablo (Epik High)	Do Re Mi Kong Kong Kong	Jewelry (Park Jung-ah, Lee Ji-hyun), Eun Ji-won, Haha, Bbaek Ga (Koyote)	
178	April 21, 2005	WtS: Picnic Song (피크닉의 노래)	Cha Seung-won, Park Yong-woo, Ji Sung	Do Re Mi Kong Kong Kong	Jewelry (Park Jung-ah, Lee Ji-hyun), Eun Ji-won, Haha, Bbaek Ga (Koyote)	The guests at left promoted for Blood Rain
179	April 28, 2005	Happy Together History				Last episode of Kim Je-dong as host; End of Season 1

=== Special Broadcast ===
List of special episodes

Episode #	Date aired	Person corner	Guests	Person corner	Guests	Notes
Special	December 23, 2005	Christmas Metal Tray Karaoke Room: Carol Medley (Look Out the Windows (창 밖을 보라) + Jingle Bells (Shim Hyung-rae version) (징글벨) + Kind of Shots (탄일종)+ The Little Drummer Boy (북 치는 소년))	Hwang Soo-kyung, Kang Soo-jeong, Noh Hyun-jeong			Hosts: Yoo Jae-suk, Kim Je-dong, Cha Tae-hyun; KBS Announcers Special
Special	January 27, 2006	New Year Special Metal Tray Karaoke Room: New Year (설)	Kim Young-ok, Lee Young-ha, Lee Kyung-jin			Hosts: Shin Dong-yup, Kim Je-dong, Hyun Young; Bizarre Bunch Special
Special	October 6, 2006	Chuseok Special Seventy Weeks Metal Tray Karaoke Room: Autumn (가을)	Noh Joo-hyun, Kim Hye-sun, Lee Tae-ran, Choi Jung-won, Shin Ji-soo			Hosts: Shin Dong-yup, Lee Hyori; Famous Chil Princesses Special
Special	September 25, 2007	Thanksgiving Metal Tray Karaoke Room: So And (그래 그래서)	Hwang Jung-min, Lu-Vada Dunford, Eva Popiel, Sun Yao			Hosts: Shin Dong-yup, Lee Hyori

Notes

- WtS = Way to School
- Themes of "Way to School" are the Korean old songs with different genres such as folk, art, children ...

== Happy Together Friends (2005–2007) ==
=== 2005 ===
List of episodes in 2005 (episodes 1 – 35)

Episode #	Air Date	Guest		Guest	Panel	Notes
Pilot	February 14, 2005	Danny Ahn (g.o.d)	vs	Shin Ji (Koyote)	g.o.d (Son Hoyoung, Kim Tae-woo, Joon Park), Kim Jong-min (Koyote), Chun Myung-hoon (NRG), Lee Ji-hyun (Jewelry)	Yoo Jae-suk, Eugene and Tak Jae-hoon was the hosts for this episode
Season 2 First Broadcast – Happy Together Friends
1	May 5, 2005	Kim Je-dong	vs	Ye Ji-won	Kim Saem, Chun Myung-hoon (NRG), Ji Hyun-woo, Oh Yoon-ah	Kim Ah-joong replaced Eugene and became a fixed host alongside Yoo Jae-suk and Tak Jae-hoon
2	May 12, 2005	Kang Soo-jeong	vs	Yoon Do-hyun	Kim C, Tiger JK, Chae Yeon, Shin Young-il	
3	May 19, 2005	Shin Jung-hwan	vs	Ock Joo-hyun	Bae Ki-sung (CAN), Eun Ji-won, Kim Jong-seok, Lee Ji-hye	
4	May 26, 2005	Park Eun-hye	vs	Lee Hyuk-jae	Hong Rok-gi, Sugar (Park Soo-jin, Iconiq), Choi Jung-won	
5	June 2, 2005	Jo Hye-ryun	vs	MC Mong	Noh Hong-chul, Lee Young-eun, Kim In-seok, Kim Ji-hye	
6	June 9, 2005	Sung Si-kyung	vs	Yoon Jong-shin	Chun Myung-hoon (NRG), Byul, Lee So-eun, Park Myeong-su	
7	June 16, 2005	Shin Hye-sung (Shinhwa)	vs	Lee Seung-chul	(Jung Jae-yong (DJ DOC), Kang Susie	
8	June 23, 2005	Park Jung-ah (Jewelry)	vs	Park Jun-gyu	Seo In-young (Jewelry), Jo Min-ah, Kim Young-chul	
9	June 30, 2005	Kim Jeong-hoon (UN)	vs	Kim Na-woon	Kim Young-chul, Jang Youngran, The Jadu (Jadu, Kang Doo)	
10	July 7, 2005	Kim Kyung-ran	vs	Ji Suk-jin	Kim Ki-man, Kim Young-chul, Choi Ji-yeon, Defconn	
11	July 14, 2005	Jeong Hyeong-don	vs	Kim Seo-hyung	Seo Ji-hye, Kim Ok-vin, Cha Ye-ryun, Kim Young-chul, Kim Min-kyo	
12	July 21, 2005	Park Kyung-lim	vs	Park Soo-hong	Choi Ji-yeon, Kim Young-chul, Chae Geon, Soy	Summer Special
13	July 28, 2005	Happy Together MC Special				Summer Special
14	August 4, 2005	Shin Dong-yup	vs	Lee Ah-hyun		Summer Special
15	August 11, 2005	Jo Min-ki	vs	Ji Sang-ryeol		Summer Special
16	August 18, 2005	Lee Beom-soo	vs	Kim Jong-kook		Summer Special
17	August 25, 2005	Nam Hee-suk	vs	Lee Sung-jin (NRG)		
18	September 1, 2005	Jo Eun-sook	vs	Yoon Jung-soo		
19	September 8, 2005	Kang Won-rae (Clon)	vs	Koo Jun-yup (Clon)		
20	September 15, 2005	Hong Seo-beom & Jo Gap-kyung	vs	Park Joon-hyung & Kim Ji-hye		Chuseok Special
21	September 22, 2005	Hong Rok-gi	vs	Kang Susie		
22	September 29, 2005	Gong Hyung-jin	vs	Noh Hyun-jeong		
23	October 6, 2005	Oh Yoon-ah	vs	Jo Hyung-gi		
24	October 13, 2005	Lee Yoon-seok	vs	Choi Eun-kyung		
25	October 20, 2005	Kim Mi-hwa	vs	Kim Chang-ryul (DJ DOC)		
26	October 27, 2005	Noh Sa-yeon	vs	Jang Woo-hyuk		
27	November 3, 2005	Shin Hyun-joon	vs	Jung Ji-young		
28	November 10, 2005	Seo Kyung-seok	vs	Seo Ji-young		
29	November 17, 2005	Byun Woo-min	vs	Song Eun-i		
30	November 24, 2005	Kim Wan-sun	vs	Kim Jong-min (Koyote)		
31	December 1, 2005	Shim Hyung-rae	vs	Jang Yun-jeong		
32	December 8, 2005	Lee Tae-ran	vs	Namkoong Min		
33	December 15, 2005	Tae Jin-ah	vs	Jo Sung-mo	Eru, Lee Yeon-doo, Kim Yeon-sook	
34	December 22, 2005	Jeong Jun-ha	vs	Hyun Young		
35	December 29, 2005	Year End Special				

=== 2006 ===
List of episodes in 2006 (episodes 36 – 87)

Episode #	Air Date	Guest		Guest	Panel	Notes
36	January 5, 2006	Lee Young-ha	vs	Park Jung-soo		
37	January 12, 2006	Lee Young-ha	vs	Park Jung-soo		
38	January 19, 2006	Choi Ran	vs	Haha		
39	January 26, 2006	Choi Soo-jong	vs	Shin Ae		New Year Special
40	February 2, 2006	Kim Soo-ro	vs	Cho Yeo-jeong		Kim Ah-joong hasn't appeared on this episode
41	February 9, 2006	Lee Hong-ryeol	vs	Im Ye-jin		
42	February 16, 2006	Kim Heung-gook	vs	Park Mi-sun		
43	February 23, 2006	Chun Myung-hoon (NRG)	vs	Geum Bo-ra		
44	March 2, 2006	Lee Hyori	vs	Sul Woon-do		
45	March 9, 2006	Son Beom-soo	vs	Jin Yang-hye		
46	March 16, 2006	Lee Kye-in	vs	Lee Soo-young		
47	March 23, 2006	Kim Chang-sook	vs	Kim C		
48	March 30, 2006	Lee Kyung-kyu	vs	Chae Yeon		
49	April 6, 2006	Lee Kyung-kyu	vs	Chae Yeon		
50	April 13, 2006	Kim Soo-mi	vs	Im Ha-ryong		
51	April 20, 2006	Kim Soo-mi	vs	Im Ha-ryong		
52	April 27, 2006	Lee Eung-kyung	vs	Lee Jin-woo		Last episode of Kim Ah-joong and Tak Jae-hoon as hosts
53	May 4, 2006	1st Anniversary Special				Lee Hyori joined as host
54	May 11, 2006	Moon So-ri	vs	Go Doo-shim		Lee Soo-geun joined as host
55	May 18, 2006	Kangta	vs	Tony An		
56	May 25, 2006	Lee Sang-byuk	vs	Lee Ji-yeon		
57	June 1, 2006	Kim Joon-ho, Lee Soo-geun, Yoo Se-yoon, Go Hye-sung				Gag Concert Special
58	June 8, 2006	Yoo Sang-chul	vs	Lee Byung-jin		
59	June 15, 2006	Kim Hyun-chul	vs	Bada		
60	June 22, 2006	Baek Ji-young	vs	Bae Ki-sung (CAN)		
61	June 29, 2006	Ku Hye-sun	vs	Kang Seok-woo		
62	July 6, 2006	Jung Seon-hee	vs	Lee So-yeon		
63	July 13, 2006	Kim Hye-sun	vs	Kim Bo-min		
64	July 20, 2006	Kim Yong-man	vs	Ahn Hye-kyung		
65	July 27, 2006	Shin Ae-ra	vs	Jin Goo		
66	August 3, 2006	Park Hae-mi	vs	Hwayobi		
67	August 10, 2006	Yoon Hae-young	vs	Hong Kyung-min		
68	August 17, 2006	Eugene	vs	Psy		
69	August 24, 2006	Lee Ji-hoon	vs	Kim Ji-ho		Lee Hyori hasn't appeared on this episode; Special MC: Hyun Young
70	August 31, 2006	Yuri (Cool)	vs	Noh Hong-chul		
71	September 7, 2006	Park Cheol	vs	Kim Hyun-jung		
72	September 14, 2006	Lee Ji-hye	vs	Lee Han-wi		
73	September 21, 2006	Lee Young-ja	vs	Park Si-yeon		
74	September 28, 2006	Hwangbo	vs	Joo Young-hoon		
75	October 5, 2006	Ha Choon-hwa	vs	Yoo Jung-hyun		
76	October 12, 2006	Jung Jong-cheol	vs	Park Ji-yoon		
77	October 19, 2006	Park Sang-min	vs	Ahn Seon-young		
78	October 26, 2006	Kang Soo-jeong	vs	Shin Jung-hwan		
79	November 2, 2006	Nam Sung-jin	vs	Kim Ji-young		
80	November 9, 2006	Jun Jin (Shinhwa)	vs	Lee Hwi-jae		
81	November 16, 2006	Kim Tae-woo (g.o.d)	vs	Son Hoyoung (g.o.d)		
82	November 23, 2006	MC Mong	vs	Wang Bit-na		
83	November 30, 2006	Ji Sang-ryeol	vs	Nam Hee-suk		
84	December 7, 2006	Ji Hyun-woo	vs	Hwang Soo-kyung		
85	December 14, 2006	Lee Yoon-ji	vs	Seo Ji-seok	Se7en	
86	December 21, 2006	Park Yoo-chun (TVXQ)	vs	Oh Ji-ho		
87	December 28, 2006	Han Ji-min	vs	Park Sang-myun		Year End Special

=== 2007 ===
List of episodes in 2007 (episodes 88 – 112)

Episode #	Air Date	Guest		Guest	Panel	Notes
88	January 4, 2007	Lee Jung-hyun	vs	Kim Hyung-ja		
89	January 11, 2007	Jo Min-ki	vs	Yoon Do-hyun		Last episode of Lee Hyori as host
90	January 18, 2007	Yoo Jun-sang	vs	Park Gun-hyung		Eugene joined as host
91	January 25, 2007	Yoon Jong-shin	vs	Kim Mi-ryeo		
92	February 1, 2007	Kim Sung-eun	vs	Kim Suk-hoon		
93	February 8, 2007	Jung Han-yong	vs	Lee Hoon		
94	February 15, 2007	Jeon Hye-bin	vs	Choi Hong-man		
95	February 22, 2007	Lee Young-ha	vs	Yoon Yoo-sun		
96	March 1, 2007	Lee Kyung-kyu	vs	Ji Soo-won		
97	March 8, 2007	Kim Heung-gook	vs	So Yoo-jin		
98	March 15, 2007	Jang Na-ra	vs	Noh Joo-hyun		
99	March 22, 2007	Kim Seung-soo	vs	Won Ki-joon		
100	March 29, 2007	Lee Hyori	vs	Dokgo Young-jae		
101	April 5, 2007	Ivy	vs	Jo Hyung-gi		
102	April 12, 2007	Kim Gun-mo	vs	Kang Jeong-hwa		
103	April 19, 2007	Kim Ja-ok	vs	Jung Seon-kyung		
104	April 26, 2007	Lee Hyun-woo	vs	Byun Jung-soo		Last episode of Lee Soo-geun as host
105	May 3, 2007	Jeon Won-joo	vs	Kim Gura		Shin Bong-sun joined as host
106	May 10, 2007	Sa Mi-ja	vs	VJ Charles		
107	May 17, 2007	Lee Ki-chan	vs	Yeo Woon-kay		
108	May 24, 2007	Haha	vs	Jeong Hyeong-don		
109	May 31, 2007	Kim Heechul (Super Junior)	vs	Hong Rok-gi		
110	June 7, 2007	Lee Jung	vs	Kim Cheong		
111	June 14, 2007	Kim Jong-seo	vs	Jo Won-seok		
112	June 21, 2007	Highlights – Happy Together Friends last episode				Last episode of Eugene as host; End of Season 2

== Happy Together Season 3 (2007–2018) ==
=== 2007 ===
List of episodes in 2007 (episodes 1 – 26)

Episode #	Air Date	Guests	Notes
Season 3 First Broadcast / Reorganization
1	July 5, 2007	First broadcast	Park Myeong-su, Ji Sang-ryeol and Park Jun-gyu joined as the new hosts, alongside Yoo Jae-suk and Shin Bong-sun
2	July 12, 2007	Brian (Fly to the Sky), Nam Gyu-ri (SeeYa), Solbi (Typhoon)	
3	July 19, 2007	Kim Heung-gook, Kim Hyun-chul, Kim Dong-wan (Shinhwa), Solbi (Typhoon), Yang Eun-ji	
4	July 26, 2007	Seo Soo-nam, Jung Han-yong, Ji Suk-jin, Lee Se-eun, Choo So-young	
5	August 2, 2007	Kim Jong-seo, Kim Sung-soo (Cool), Lee Soo-geun, Lee Hyun-ji	
6	August 9, 2007	Kim Gura, Lee Hyuk-jae, Chae Yeon, Solbi (Typhoon), Yang Hee-eun	
7	August 16, 2007	Joo Young-hoon, Son Hoyoung (g.o.d), Solbi (Typhoon)	
8	August 23, 2007	Kim Jang-hoon, DJ DOC (Kim Chang-ryul, (Jung Jae-yong, Lee Seung-gi, Solbi (Typhoon)	
9	August 30, 2007	Im Ha-ryong, Kim Mi-hwa, Jeong Jun-ha, Lee So-yeon	
10	September 6, 2007	Im Ha-ryong, Kim Mi-hwa, Jeong Jun-ha, Lee So-yeon	
11	September 13, 2007	Shim Hyung-rae, Lee Bong-won, Park Seung-dae	
12	September 20, 2007	Shim Hyung-rae, Lee Bong-won, Park Seung-dae	
13	September 27, 2007	Kim Bo-min, Park Ji-yoon, Choi Song-hyun	
14	October 4, 2007	Kim Heung-gook, Kim Jong-seo, Seo In-young, Nam Hee-suk, Solbi (Typhoon), Kim Gura	
15	October 11, 2007	Shinhwa (Shin Hye-sung, Kim Dong-wan), Kim Jong-min (Koyote), Solbi (Typhoon), Kim Gura	
16	October 18, 2007	Park Kyung-lim, Lee Yoon-seok, Bae Seul-ki, Solbi (Typhoon)	
17	October 25, 2007	Lee Jung, Haeeunlee, Haha	
18	November 1, 2007	Jo Hyung-gi, Haha, Lee Jung, Solbi (Typhoon)	
19	November 8, 2007	Roo'ra (Kim Ji-hyun, Go Young-wook), Solbi (Typhoon)	
20	November 15, 2007	Sung Si-kyung, Hyun Young, Hong Rok-gi, Wheesung	
21	November 22, 2007	Lee Seung-chul, Super Junior (Kangin, Shindong), Solbi (Typhoon)	
22	November 29, 2007	Sung Si-kyung, Hyun Young, Hong Rok-gi, Wheesung	
23	December 6, 2007	Shin Hae-chul, Kim Chang-ryul (DJ DOC), Crown J, Yoona (SNSD)	
24	December 13, 2007	Park Jin-young, Wonder Girls (Sunye, Sohee), Yoona (SNSD)	
25	December 20, 2007	S.E.S., Jung Jong-cheol	
26	December 27, 2007	Park Jun-gyu, Park Mi-sun, Choi Song-hyun	

=== 2008 ===
List of episodes in 2008 (episodes 27 – 78)

Episode #	Air Date	Guests	Notes
27	January 3, 2008	Park Mi-sun, Yoon Jung-soo, Kim Ji-hye, Han Young	
28	January 10, 2008	Lee Kyung-shil, Park Mi-sun, Eun Ji-won (Sechs Kies), Lee Young-eun	Last episode of Ji Sang-ryeol and Park Jun-gyu as hosts
29	January 17, 2008	Nam Sung-jin, Kim Ji-young	Park Mi-sun joined as host
30	January 24, 2008	Kang Jung-hwa, Eru, Yoona (SNSD)	
31	January 31, 2008	Kim Gura, Ji Sang-ryeol, Yeom Kyung-hwan, SNSD (Tiffany, Yoona)	
32	February 7, 2008	Yang Hee-eun, Kim Dae-hee, Kim Joon-ho, Jang Dong-min	
33	February 14, 2008	Song Dae-kwan, Shim Eun-jin	
34	February 21, 2008	Cha Tae-hyun, Yoo Se-yoon	
35	February 28, 2008	Yunho, Changmin, Jaejoong, Yoochun, Junsu	TVXQ "Original" Special
36	March 6, 2008	Ock Joo-hyun (Fin.K.L), Andy (Shinhwa)	
37	March 13, 2008	Ahn Jae-hwan, Jung Seon-hee, Lee Chun-hee	
38	March 20, 2008	Lee Soo-geun, Lee Seung-gi	
39	March 27, 2008	Moon Hee-joon (H.O.T.), Hong Eun-hee, Danny Ahn (g.o.d)	
40	April 3, 2008	Kim Byung-se, Jeong Hyeong-don	
41	April 10, 2008	Lee Young-ja, Hong Jin-kyung	
42	April 17, 2008	Lee Young-ja, Hong Jin-kyung	
43	April 24, 2008	Chae Rim, Lee Jong-hyuk, Lee Jin-wook	Formidable Rivals Special
44	May 1, 2008	Choi Ran, MC Mong, Kim Sung-eun	
45	May 8, 2008	Sunwoo Jae-duk, Yoon Jung-soo, Bae Seul-ki	
46	May 15, 2008	Lee Bong-won, Lee Se-chang, Kim Ji-yeon	
47	May 22, 2008	Sa Mi-ja, Lee Ji-hoon, Lee Se-chang, Kim Ji-yeon, Hyun Young	Two first guests co-starred in You Are My Destiny
48	May 29, 2008	Park Hae-mi, Park Sang-myun	
49	June 5, 2008	Kim Ja-ok, Byun Woo-min, Park Tae-in	
50	June 12, 2008	Ji Suk-jin, Song Eun-i, Jung Shi-ah	
51	June 19, 2008	Jo Hyung-gi, Clazziquai (Alex, Horan)	
52	June 26, 2008	Kim Han-gook, Kim Mi-hwa, Seo In-young	
53	July 3, 2008	Sunwoo Jae-duk, Lee Young-ja, Kim Young-chul, Kim Shin-young, Jo Jeong-rin	Summer Special
54	July 10, 2008	Kim Byung-se, Kim Hyun-jung, Jun Jin (Shinhwa), Lee Seung-gi, Kim Shin-young, Jo Jeong-rin	Summer Special
55	July 17, 2008	Kim Ji-ho, Yoon Jung-hee, Park Hyun-bin, Kangin (Super Junior)	
56	July 24, 2008	Lee Hyori, Shin Jung-hwan, H-Eugene	
57	July 31, 2008	Oh Dae-gyu, Jang Yun-jeong, Lee Yoon-seok	
58	August 7, 2008	Kim Na-woon, Kim Jung-hyun, Lee Kyung-shil	Two first guests co-starred in Mom's Dead Upset
59	August 14, 2008	Kim Gun-mo, Cool, Park Young-rin, Park Sung-kwang	
60	August 21, 2008	Yoo Hye-jeong, Choi Jin-young, Son Hoyoung (g.o.d), Hwangbo, Yoon Hyung-bin	
61	August 28, 2008	Kim Sung-ryung, Bang Eun-hee, Lee Jong-soo, Jung Jung-ah, Hwang Hyun-hee	
62	September 4, 2008	Lee Young-ha, Joo Young-hoon, Lee Yoon-mi, Shin Hye-sung (Shinhwa), Park Ji-sun	
63	September 11, 2008	Nam Hee-suk, Lee Sang-ah, Solbi, Jo Se-ho, Han Min-kwan	
64	September 18, 2008	Yoo Hae-jin, Kim Bin-woo, Park Seong-ho, Cultwo (Jung Chan-woo, Kim Tae-gyun)	
65	September 25, 2008	Kim Dong-hyun, Haeeunlee, Park Soo-hong, Lee Ha-neul (DJ DOC), Kim Deanna	
66	October 2, 2008	Seo Kyung-seok, Lee Yoon-seok, Lee Sung-jin, Lee Se-eun	
67	October 9, 2008	Sul Woon-do, Han Sung-joo, H-Eugene, TVXQ (Yoochun, Jaejoong, Yunho)	
68	October 16, 2008	Eugene, Lee Dong-wook, Yoon Jong-shin, Kim C	Two first guests promoted for Heartbreak Library
69	October 23, 2008	Lee Hong-ryeol, Park Jun-gyu, Park Ji-sun	
70	October 30, 2008	Song Chang-eui, Lee Wan, Kim Young-ran, Kim Ji-woo	Two first guests promoted for Once Upon a Time in Seoul
71	November 6, 2008	Rain, Jeong Jun-ha, Kim Jong-kook	
72	November 13, 2008	Lee Deok-hwa, Kim Ho-jin, Kim Suk-hoon, Lee Chae-young	Empress Cheonchu Special
73	November 20, 2008	Jo Hye-ryun, Choi Eun-kyung, Kang Soo-jeong	
74	November 27, 2008	Yoon Joo-sang, Cho Jae-hyun, Choi Hwa-jeong, Jeong Jun-ha, Kim Jong-kook	
75	December 4, 2008	Lee Soo-geun, Eun Ji-won (Sechs Kies), Kim So-yeon, Lee Soo-young	
76	December 11, 2008	Park Jin-hee, Jo Han-sun, Lee Ki-woo	They all promoted for Lost And Found
77	December 18, 2008	Tak Jae-hoon, Shin Jung-hwan, Go Young-wook (Roo'ra)	
78	December 25, 2008	Gong Hyung-jin, Cho Yeo-jeong, Go Young-wook (Roo'ra), Cool (Kim Sung-soo, Lee Jae-hoon)	Christmas Special

=== 2009 ===
List of episodes in 2009 (episodes 79 – 129)

Episode #	Air Date	Guests	Notes
79	January 1, 2009	Yu Oh-seong, Song Seon-mi, Park Eun-hye, Park Hwi-soon	
80	January 8, 2009	Jung Joon-ho, Jung Woong-in, Jung Woon-taek, Park Sang-min	They all promoted for City of Damnation
81	January 15, 2009	Choi Yang-rak, Lee Bong-won, Kim Jung-ryul, Park Hwi-soon	
82	January 22, 2009	Cho Jae-hyun, Park Si-yeon, Kim Kang-woo, Lee Han-wi	Three first guests promoted for Marine Boy
83	January 29, 2009	Park Yong-ha, Park Hee-soon, Park Ye-jin, Jung Gyu-woon	Two first guests promoted for The Scam; Two guests remaining co-starred in Again, My Love
84	February 5, 2009	Oh Man-seok, Jo Hyung-ki, Jeong Hyeong-don, Choi Jung-yoon	
85	February 12, 2009	Park Yong-woo, Uhm Tae-woong, Ahn Seon-young, Hwang Hyun-hee	Two first guests promoted for Handphone
86	February 19, 2009	Ahn Moon-sook, Choi Sung-kook, Im Chang-jung, Lee Young-eun	
87	February 26, 2009	Ku Hye-sun, Kim Hyun-joong (SS501), Kim Joon, Park Hwi-soon	Three first guests co-starred in Boys Over Flowers
88	March 5, 2009	Ku Hye-sun, Kim Hyun-joong (SS501), Kim Joon, Park Hwi-soon	Three first guests co-starred in Boys Over Flowers
88	March 5, 2009	Kim Kyu-jong (SS501), Yoon Son-ha, Lee Bong-won, Jeong Jun-ha, Sayuri Fujita	
89	March 12, 2009	Noh Sa-yeon, Ji Sang-ryeol, Park So-hyun, Jun Hyun-moo	
90	March 19, 2009	Choi Yeo-jin, Hong Soo-ah, Parc Jae-jung, Park Hwi-soon, Han Min-kwan	
91	March 26, 2009	Kim Tae-won, Yoon Do-hyun, Kim C, Hwayobi	
92	April 2, 2009	Baek Il-seob, Lee Pil-mo, Yoo Sun, Han Sang-jin, Park Hwi-soon	Four first guests co-starred in My Too Perfect Sons
93	April 9, 2009	Lee Kyung-kyu, Lee Yoon-seok, Yoon Hyung-bin, H-Eugene	
94	April 16, 2009	Lee Kyung-kyu, Lee Yoon-seok, Yoon Hyung-bin, H-Eugene	
94	April 16, 2009	Kim Jang-hoon, Yoo Jun-sang, Park Gun-hyung, Yoo Chae-yeong, Hwang Hyun-hee	
95	April 23, 2009	Lee Sun-hee, MC Mong, Lee Soo-geun, Son Dam-bi, Kim Kyu-jong (SS501)	
96	April 30, 2009	Jo Sung-mo, Uhm Ji-won, Jung Sung-hwa, Won Ki-joon	
97	May 7, 2009	Im Hyun-sik, Kim Ja-ok, Park Ji-yoon, Kim Hee-chul (Super Junior)	
98	May 14, 2009	Lee Hyun-woo, Kang Yoo-mi, Ahn Young-mi, Lee Sung-jin	
99	May 21, 2009	Lee Hyun-woo, Kang Yoo-mi, Ahn Young-mi, Lee Sung-jin	
99	May 21, 2009	Lee Young-ha, Jang Shin-young, Solbi, Moon Cheon-sik	
100	June 4, 2009	Ji Suk-jin, Jo Hye-ryun, Song Eun-i, Kim Hyun-chul	100th Special – MC's Best Friends.
101	June 11, 2009	Ji Suk-jin, Jo Hye-ryun, Song Eun-i, Kim Hyun-chul	100th Special – MC's Best Friends.
101	June 11, 2009	Choi Cheol-ho, Jung Tae-woo, Lee Jung-hyun, Eun Ji-won (Sechs Kies)	
102	June 18, 2009	Uhm Jung-hwa, Ji Jin-hee, Yang Jung-a, Kim So-eun	He Who Can't Marry Special
103	June 25, 2009	Lee Seung-chul, Yoon Sang-hyun, Taeyeon (SNSD)	
104	July 2, 2009	Bae Jong-ok, Kim Soo-ro, Kim Gyu-ri, Park Hwi-soon	Three first guests co-starred in Five Senses of Eros : The 33rd Man
105	July 9, 2009	Park Kyung-lim, Jang Na-ra, Lee Soo-young	
106	July 16, 2009	Park Kyung-lim, Jang Na-ra, Lee Soo-young	
107	July 23, 2009	Park Hye-mi, Ock Joo-hyun (Fin.K.L), Yoo Se-yoon, Oh Jung-yeon	
108	July 30, 2009	Kim Bo-yeon, Nam Sang-mi, Yang Won-kyung, Hong Gi-hoon	Two first guests promoted for Possessed
109	August 6, 2009	Ha Yoo-mi, Kim Hyo-jin, Woo Jong-wan, Moon Hee-joon (H.O.T.)	
110	August 13, 2009	Yoon Eun-hye (Baby V.O.X), Yoon Sang-hyun, Jung Il-woo, Moon Chae-won, Hong Jin-young	Summer Special; My Fair Lady Special
111	August 20, 2009	Yoon Eun-hye (Baby V.O.X), Yoon Sang-hyun, Jung Il-woo, Moon Chae-won, Hong Jin-young	Summer Special; My Fair Lady Special
112	August 27, 2009	Jo Min-ki, Lee Hoon, Han Sung-joo, Park Sung-kwang	
113	September 3, 2009	Yoon Da-hoon, Park Sang-myun, Jung Woong-in, Woo Hee-jin	Three Men Special
114	September 10, 2009	Choi Kang-hee, Bae Soo-bin, Kim Sook, Gill	Two first guests promoted for Goodbye Mom
115	September 17, 2009	Lee Sung-mi, Lee Young-ja, Song Eun-i, Kim Young-chul	
116	September 24, 2009	Tae Jin-ah, Kyeon Mi-ri, Sung Jin-woo, Seo In-young	
117	October 1, 2009	Lee Seung-gi, MC Mong, Bong Tae-gyu, Heo Kyung-hwan	
118	October 8, 2009	Chae Jung-an, Choi Cheol-ho, Park Hae-jin, Jo Yoon-hee	Hot Blood Special
119	October 15, 2009	Do Ji-won, Oh Dae-gyu, Ahn Nae-sang, Kim Hee-jung, Lee Joon-hyuk	Three Brothers Special
120	October 22, 2009	Lee Sun-kyun, Seo Woo, Kim Je-dong, Kim Tae-woo (G.o.d)	Two first guests promoted for Paju
121	October 29, 2009	Jang Hyuk, Jo Dong-hyuk, Lee Sang-woo, Kim Na-young	Three first guests promoted for Searching for the Elephant
122	November 5, 2009	Park Ye-jin, Im Chang-jung, Park Hwi-soon, Marco	Three first guests promoted for Fortune Salon
123	November 12, 2009	Hong Eun-hee, Kim So-yeon, Epik High	
124	November 19, 2009	Lee Beom-soo, Sung Dong-il, Kim Soo-ro, Lee Si-young	They all promoted for The Descendants of Hong Gil-Dong
125	November 26, 2009	SS501 (Kim Hyun-joong, Kim Kyu-jong), Lee Hyuk-jae, Kim Hyun-chul	
126	December 3, 2009	Psy, Kim Jin-pyo, Jessica (SNSD), Park Ji-sun	
127	December 10, 2009	Han Chae-young, Kang Hye-jung, Huh E-jae, Bae Soo-bin	They all promoted for Girlfriends
128	December 17, 2009	Nam Hee-suk, Kim Shin-young, Kim Bo-min, One Two	
129	December 24, 2009	Choi Hwa-jeong, Lee Young-ja, Kim Young-chul	Special appearance by Jo Kwon

=== 2010 ===
List of episodes in 2010 (episodes 130 – 177)

Episode #	Air Date	Guests	Notes
130	January 2, 2010	Oh Ji-ho, Lee Da-hae, Jang Hyuk, Kim Soo-ro, Bae Doona, Oh Yoon-ah	Year 2010 with the shining stars; Three first guests co-starred in The Slave Hunters; Three guests remaining co-starred in Master of Study
131	January 7, 2010	Oh Ji-ho, Lee Da-hae, Jang Hyuk, Kim Soo-ro, Bae Doona, Oh Yoon-ah	Year 2010 with the shining stars; Three first guests co-starred in The Slave Hunters; Three guests remaining co-starred in Master of Study
132	January 14, 2010	Hyun Young, Jo Hye-ryun, Kang Soo-jeong, Yoo Chae-yeong	
133	January 21, 2010	Hwang Jung-eum, Uee (After School), Ji Sang-ryeol, K.Will	
134	January 28, 2010	Gong Hyung-jin, Danny Ahn (g.o.d), Jo An, Jung Joo-ri	Two first guests co-starred in The Slave Hunters
135	February 4, 2010	Lee Soo-geun, Kim Jong-min (Koyote), NRG (Chun Myung-hoon, Lee Sung-jin, Noh Yoo-min)	
136	February 11, 2010	Lee Seung-gi, Kim Jong-kook, Brown Eyed Girls (Narsha, Gain), Shorry J (Mighty Mouth)	
137	February 18, 2010	Kim So-eun, Kang Ji-sub, Seo Hyo-rim, Park Sung-kwang, Park Young-rin	Three first guests co-starred in A Good Day for the Wind to Blow
138	February 25, 2010	Lee Bo-young, Ji Hyun-woo, Lee Si-young, Kim Byung-man, Ryu Dam	Three first guests co-starred in Becoming a Billionaire
139	March 4, 2010	Kim Hak-rae, Im Mi-sook, Park Seong-ho, Hwang Hyun-hee	
140	March 11, 2010	Ji Suk-jin, Kim Tae-hyun, Nicole (KARA), Jun Hyun-moo	Star Golden Bell MCs Special
141	March 18, 2010	Hong Rok-gi, Pyo In-bong, Park Hyun-bin, T-ara (Hyomin, Jiyeon)	
142	March 25, 2010	Moon Geun-young, Chun Jung-myung, Ok Taecyeon (2PM), Seo Woo	Cinderella's Sister Special
143	April 8, 2010	Moon Geun-young, Chun Jung-myung, Ok Taecyeon (2PM), Seo Woo	Cinderella's Sister Special
144	April 22, 2010	Kim C, Tablo, 2AM (Jo Kwon, Jinwoon), Song Ho-beom	
145	May 6, 2010	Im Chae-moo, Son Byong-ho, Lee Kyung-shil, Im Ye-jin, Lee Jong-soo	Two first guests promoted for Republic of Korea 1%
146	May 13, 2010	Rain, Lee Hyori, Goo Hara (KARA), Lee Joon (MBLAQ)	
147	May 20, 2010	Rain, Lee Hyori, Goo Hara (KARA), Lee Joon (MBLAQ)	
147	May 20, 2010	Lee Sung-jae, Kang Sung-jin, 2PM (Nichkhun, Junho)	Two first guests promoted for Dreams Come True
148	May 27, 2010	Kim Tae-won, Yoon Hyung-bin, Jeong Hyeong-don, Haha, Defconn	
149	June 3, 2010	Kim Joo-hyuk, Cho Yeo-jeong, Kim Sung-ryung, Kim Young-chul	Three first guests promoted for The Servant
149	June 3, 2010	Sunye, Sohee, Yenny, Yubin, Hyelim	Wonder Girls Special
150	June 10, 2010	Sunye, Sohee, Yenny, Yubin, Hyelim	Wonder Girls Special
151	June 17, 2010	Kim Ji-young, Lee Jong-hyuk, Oh Yoon-ah, Han Sang-jin	Marry Me, Please Special
152	June 24, 2010	Yoon Shi-yoon, Lee Young-ah, Eugene (S.E.S.), Super Junior (Leeteuk, Eunhyuk)	Three first guests co-starred in Bread, Love and Dreams
153	July 1, 2010	Lee Sung-mi, Lee Bong-won, Kang Sung-beom, Kim Sook	
154	July 8, 2010	Han Eun-jung, Jang Hyun-sung, Kim Jung-nan, Yoon Jung-soo	Three first guests co-starred in Grudge: The Revolt of Gumiho
155	July 15, 2010	Sung Dong-il, Song Joong-ki, Kim Jung-tae, Ahn Seon-young	Three first guests promoted for Hearty Paws 2
156	July 22, 2010	Son Dam-bi, After School (Kahi, Lizzy), Jung Yong-hwa (CNBLUE), Simon D (Supreme Team)	
157	July 29, 2010	Jo Mi-ryung, Kim Sung-min, Yoon Ji-min, Kim Kwang-kyu	
158	August 5, 2010	Hwang Jung-eum, Jiyeon (T-ara), Shindong (Super Junior), Hong Jin-young	Two first guests promoted for Death Bell 2: Bloody Camp
159	August 12, 2010	Ha Choon-hwa, Kim Young-chul, Lee Kye-in, Kim Shin-young	
160	August 19, 2010	Song Dae-kwan, Tae Jin-ah, Jang Yun-jeong, Heo Kyung-hwan	
161	August 26, 2010	Eru, Brian (Fly to the Sky), Seo In-guk, Homme (Changmin, Lee Hyun)	
162	September 2, 2010	Seven, So Yoo-jin, Jin Yi-han, Park Ji-sun	Two first guests promoted for Break Away
163	September 9, 2010	Lee Min-jung, Uhm Tae-woong, Park Shin-hye, Park Chul-min, Hwang Hyun-hee	Four first guests promoted for Cyrano Agency
164	September 16, 2010	Hwang Jung-min, Kim Kyung-ran, Jun Hyun-moo, Oh Jeong-yeon	KBS Announcers Special
165	September 23, 2010	Son Byong-ho, Song Eun-i, Kim Sook, Kim Young-chul, Park Hwi-soon	
166	September 30, 2010	Joo Won, Park Sung-woong, Kim Tae-hyung (Click-B), Kim Na-young	
167	October 7, 2010	Park So-hyun, Park Jung-ah (Jewelry), Wheesung, Alex (Clazziquai)	
168	October 14, 2010	Sunwoo Yong-nyeo, Park Yeong-gyu, NRG (Chun Myung-hoon, Noh Yoo-min)	
169	October 21, 2010	Choo Ja-hyun, Kim Heung-soo, Jung Chan, Park Seul-gi, Sunwoo	Three first guests promoted for Loveholic
170	October 28, 2010	Uhm Ji-won, Im Chang-jung, Hong Soo-ah, Lee Jin (Fin.K.L)	Two first guests promoted for Romantic Debtors
171	November 4, 2010	Jun. K, Nichkhun, Taecyeon, Wooyoung, Junho, Chansung	2PM Special
172	November 11, 2010	Taeyeon, Yuri, Seohyun, Sunny, Sooyoung	SNSD Special
173	November 18, 2010	Tony An (H.O.T.), Kim Ji-seon, Jung Joo-ri, Hwang Hyun-hee, Kim Jae-duc (J-Walk)	
174	December 2, 2010	KARA, 2AM, Jun Hyun-moo	
175	December 9, 2010	KARA, 2AM, Jun Hyun-moo	
176	December 16, 2010	Choi Soo-jong, Jung Han-yong, Kim Heung-soo, Lee Sung-min (Super Junior), Jay Kim (TRAX)	The President Special
177	December 23, 2010	Lee Yoon-ji, Um Ki-joon, Lee Byung-joon, Suzy (Miss A), Kim Soo-hyun	Dream High Special

=== 2011 ===
List of episodes in 2011 (episodes 178 – 229)

Episode #	Air Date	Guests	Notes
178	January 6, 2011	Park Joo-mi, Lee Jae-ryong, Moon Jeong-hee, Han Chae-ah	Believe in Love Special
179	January 13, 2011	Jung Seon-hee, Lee Soo-geun, Jung Shi-ah, Dal Shabet (Jiyul, Subin)	
180	January 20, 2011	Jung Jin-young, Lee Moon-sik, Sunwoo Sun, Kim Sook	Three first guests promoted for Battlefield Heroes
181	January 27, 2011	Yoon Jong-shin, Kim Jang-hoon, Soyeon (T-ara), Jeongeun (Aurora), Kwanghee (ZE:A)	
182	February 3, 2011	Ahn Moon-sook, Yoon Son-ha, Subin (Dal Shabet), Kim Tae-hyun, Heo Kyung-hwan	
183	February 10, 2011	TVXQ (Yunho, Changmin), Onew (SHINee), F(x) (Sulli, Krystal, Luna)	
184	February 17, 2011	Choi Ran, Kim Bo-min, Shoo, Lee Yoo-jin	
185	February 24, 2011	Kim Min-jung, Han Hye-jin, Joo Sang-wook, Seo Do-young	The Thorn Birds Special
186	March 3, 2011	Song Il-gook, Song Ji-hyo, Lee Jong-hyuk, Kim Joon, Kim Dae-hee, Kim Joon-ho	Four first guests co-starred in Detectives in Trouble
187	March 10, 2011	Moon Hee-joon, Eun Ji-won, Kim Dong-wan (Shinhwa), Kim Tae-woo (G.o.d)	
HD official broadcasting
188	March 17, 2011	Yoon Eun-hye, Park Han-byul, Kim So-ri, Jun Hyun-moo, Park Hwi-soon, K.Will	
189	March 24, 2011	Lee Sang-yong, Wang Jong-geun, Kim Hak-rae, Park Se-min, Kim Joon-ho	
190	March 31, 2011	Shin Hyun-joon, Jeon No-min, Nam Hee-suk, Kim Hyun-chul, Haegeum (Bebe Mignon)	Two first guests promoted for Sin of a Family
191	April 7, 2011	Kim Kap-soo, IU, Eunjung (T-ara), Yangpa, Kim Mi-ryeo, Kim Joon-ho	
192	April 14, 2011	Kim Bo-min, Lee Jeong-min, Oh Jeong-yeon, Park Eun-young, Kim Hyun-wook, Jun Hyun-moo	KBS Announcers Special
193	April 21, 2011	Jung Yong-hwa (CNBLUE), Lee Gi-kwang (BEAST), Kwanghee (ZE:A), Simon D (Supreme Team), Dal Shabet (Serri, Ah Young)	
194	April 28, 2011	Jang Na-ra, Choi Daniel, Ryu Jin, Kim Min-seo, Hyun Young, Park Seul-gi	Five first guests co-starred in Baby Faced Beauty
195	May 5, 2011	Sung Yu-ri, Min Hyo-rin, Jung Gyu-woon, Kim Min-jun, Son Byong-ho	Four first guests co-starred in Romance Town
196	May 12, 2011	Park Ji-yoon, Choi Dong-seok, Park Tam-hee, Heo Young-saeng (SS501), Kim Jong-min (Koyote)	
197	May 19, 2011	Sung Si-kyung, Kim Jang-hoon, Chun Myung-hoon, Kim Young-chul	
198	May 26, 2011	Baek Ji-young, Yuri (Cool), Lee Ji-hye, Jang Woo-hyuk, Chun Myung-hoon	
199	June 2, 2011	Baek Ji-young, Yuri (Cool), Lee Ji-hye, Jang Woo-hyuk, Chun Myung-hoon	
200	June 9, 2011	Lee Hyun-woo, Lee Ji-ae, Danny Ahn (G.o.d), Super Junior (Leeteuk, Yesung)	KBS Radio DJs Special
201	June 16, 2011	Lee Tae-gon, Kim Seung-soo, Im Ho, Kim Jung-hwa, Oh Ji-eun, Lee In-hye	Gwanggaeto, The Great Conqueror Special
202	June 23, 2011	SS501 (Kim Hyun-joong, Heo Young-saeng), Kwanghee (ZE:A), Hyolyn (Sistar), Boyfriend (Youngmin, Kwangmin)	Hot Issue Special
203	June 30, 2011	Jung Seon-hee, Kim Tae-hyun, Kim Shin-young, Jun Hyun-moo	200th Special
204	July 7, 2011	Jung Seon-hee, Kim Tae-hyun, Kim Shin-young, Jun Hyun-moo	200th Special
205	July 14, 2011	Kim Byung-man, Ryu Dam, Noh Woo-jin, Park Sung-kwang, Lee Seung-yoon, Jung Tae-ho	The Master Show Special
206	July 21, 2011	Park Si-hoo, Moon Chae-won, Hong Soo-hyun, Song Jong-ho, Kim Dae-hee, Kim Joon-ho	Four first guests co-starred in The Princess' Man
207	July 28, 2011	Shin Se-kyung, Jeon Hye-bin, Han Jung-soo, Wheesung, Kim Tae-woo (G.o.d)	Superior Genes Special
208	August 4, 2011	2PM, After School (Uee, Lizzy), Dal Shabet (Subin, Ah Young), Oh Na-mi	Summer Special
209	August 11, 2011	Park Hyun-bin, Jo Kwon (2AM), Min (Miss A), Lee Joon (MBLAQ), Sungjong (Infinite), Kim Na-young	Kkap Special
210	August 18, 2011	Cha Tae-hyun, Park Ha-sun, Baek Do-bin, Park Bo-young, Kim Won-jun	Three first guests promoted for Champ
211	August 25, 2011	Lee Sang-byuk, Im Sung-min, Choi Eun-kyung, Park Ji-yoon, Kim Sung-joo	Former Announcers Special
212	September 1, 2011	Shin Hyun-joon, Tak Jae-hoon, Hyun Young, Yuko Fueki	They all promoted for Marrying the Mafia IV
213	September 8, 2011	Park Seong-ho, Kim Dae-hee, Kim Joon-ho, Park Sung-kwang, Lee Seung-yoon, Song Joon-geun	Gag Concert Special
214	September 15, 2011	Boom, Haha, Kim Hyun-chul, Go Young-wook, Jang Yoon-ju	Future Hosts Special
215	September 22, 2011	KARA, Son Byong-ho, Ji Sang-ryeol, Jun Hyun-moo, Park Hwi-soon, Heo Kyung-hwan	KARA & Uncle Fans Special
216	September 29, 2011	Lee Hong-ryul, Lee Sung-mi, Lee Kyung-shil, Victoria (F(x)), Dana (The Grace)	Best Friend Special
217	October 6, 2011	Lee Seung-chul, Yoon Mi-rae, Yang Yong-eun, Tiffany (SNSD), Huh Gak, Kim Hyun-wook, Ji Sang-ryeol, Yang Seong-cheol, Park Chang-gon, Kim Gi-seong, Im Kyung-mi, Kim Young-hak, Kim Mi-jin	Outdoor Filming (Pilot); "12:1 Take Care of Your Star" Special
218	October 13, 2011	Kim Soo-ro, Park Ye-jin, Ji Hyun-woo, Im Won-hee, Jay Park	They all promoted for Mr. Idol
219	October 20, 2011	Yeon Jung-hoon, Lee Young-ah, Lee Won-jong, Jang Hyun-sung	Vampire Prosecutor Special
220	October 27, 2011	Kim Joo-hyuk, Gong Hyung-jin, Lee Yoon-ji, Kim Tae-woo, Song Seon-mi	Three first guests promoted for Couples
221	November 3, 2011	DJ DOC (Jung Jae-yong, Kim Chang-ryul, Lee Ha-neul), Dynamic Duo (Choiza, Gaeko)	Hip-hop Special (Note: On November 11, 2011, Park Jung-hwan, a former member of DJ DOC, formally filed a lawsuit against DJ DOC for defamation after comments made by Lee Ha-neul regarding his departure on this episode. Despite several apologies made by Lee Ha-neul, the lawsuit was not rescinded. On February 22, 2012, DJ DOC was cleared of the defamation charges for lack of evidence.)
222	November 10, 2011	Son Hoyoung (G.o.d) & Son Jeong-min, Jo Hye-ryun & Jo Hye-sook, Kim Joon-ho & Kim Mi-jin	Siblings Special
223	November 17, 2011	Yang Hee-eun, Song Eun-i, Kim Young-chul, Lee Hyun-woo, Go Young-wook	
224	November 24, 2011	Lena Park, Sung Si-kyung, Kim Yeon-woo, K.Will	
225	December 1, 2011	Jung Jae-hyung, Jang Yoon-ju, Jeong Hyeong-don	
226	December 8, 2011	Cultwo (Jung Chan-woo, Kim Tae-gyun), Lee Ji-hye, Ongdalsaem (Yoo Se-yoon, Jang Dong-min, Yoo Sang-moo)	G4 (Kim Joon-ho, Kim Won-hyo, Heo Kyung-hwan, Jung Beom-gyun) joined as the secondary hosts
227	December 15, 2011	Kim Gun-mo, Yoon Il-sang, SNSD (Taeyeon, Yuri, Sooyoung, Seohyun)	Choi Hyo-jong replaced Heo Kyung-hwan as G4's member; National Singers Special
228	December 22, 2011	IU, Boom, Marco, Kim Na-young, Jun Hyun-moo	
229	December 29, 2011	Lee Kwang-soo, Lee Min-jung, Lee Jung-jin	They all promoted for Wonderful Radio

=== 2012 ===
List of episodes in 2012 (episodes 230 – 279)

Episode #	Air Date	Guests	Notes
230	January 5, 2012	Son Byong-ho, Park Yong-woo, Go Ara	They all promoted for Papa
231	January 12, 2012	Jung Ryeo-won, Uhm Tae-woong, Yoo Sun, Park Ki-woong	They all promoted for Never Ending Story
232	January 19, 2012	Uhm Jung-hwa, Hwang Jung-min	They all promoted for Dancing Queen
233	January 26, 2012	Jung Yoon-gi & Byun Jung-soo, Woo Jong-wan & Kim Hyo-jin, Kim Sung-il & Seo In-young	Fashionista Special
234	February 2, 2012	Kim Sook, Kim Soo-yong, Oh Jae-mi, Nam Hee-suk	
235	February 9, 2012	Hong Jin-kyung, Jun Hyun-moo, Nam Chang-hee, Hwang Jung-min, Yoo In-na	KBS Radio DJs
236	February 16, 2012	Jung Woong-in, Jeon Mi-seon, Ryu Soo-young, Choi Jung-yoon, Joo Won, Uee, Song Seon-mi	Ojakgyo Family Special
237	February 23, 2012	Cha In-pyo, Shim Hye-jin, Hwang Woo-seul-hye, Park Hee-jin	Sent From Heaven Special
238	March 1, 2012	Shin Dong-yup, Lee Hyori, Tak Jae-hoon, Eugene	Happy Together 10th Anniversary Special; Special appearance by Kim Ah-joong and Kim Je-dong (via telephone); Special appearance by Ock Joo-hyun and Woo Hee-jin in episode 239, at a part of "Happy Together Friends (Season 2)", as friend of Lee Hyori and Shin Dong-yup
239	March 8, 2012	Shin Dong-yup, Lee Hyori, Tak Jae-hoon, Eugene	Happy Together 10th Anniversary Special; Special appearance by Kim Ah-joong and Kim Je-dong (via telephone); Special appearance by Ock Joo-hyun and Woo Hee-jin in episode 239, at a part of "Happy Together Friends (Season 2)", as friend of Lee Hyori and Shin Dong-yup
240	March 15, 2012	Yoon Jong-shin, Sung Si-kyung, K.Will, Jang Jane	A composer and his customers
241	March 22, 2012	Kim Byung-man, Hwang Hyun-hee, Shin Bo-ra, Noh Woo-jin, Song Joon-geun, Oh Na-mi, Jo Ji-hoon, Lee Seung-yoon, Jang Dong-hyuk	Kim Byung-man Special, 17 vs 1
242	March 29, 2012	Kim Ga-yeon & Lim Yo-hwan, Yoon Hyung-bin & Jung Kyung-mi, Kim Won-hyo & Shim Jin-hwa	Couples Special
243	April 5, 2012	Park Si-yeon, Kim Jung-tae, Lee Han-wi, Jeon Soo-kyung	They all promoted for The Scent
244	April 12, 2012	Ji Suk-jin & Kim Soo-yong, Jang Na-ra & Kim Min-seo, Haha & Taw	Best Friend Special
245	April 19, 2012	Ha Ji-won, Park Chul-min, Lee Jong-suk, Choi Yoon-young, Hyun Jung-hwa, Yoo Nam-kyu	Four first guests promoted for As One
246	April 26, 2012	Song Dae-kwan & Tae Jin-ah, Han Sunhwa (Secret) & Lee Joon (MBLAQ), Kim Jun-hyun & Yoo Min-sang	Rival Special
247	May 3, 2012	Na Moon-hee, Sunwoo Yong-nyeo, Kim Soo-mi	National Mother Special
248	May 10, 2012	SNSD (Jessica, Taeyeon, Tiffany, Yoona), Shin Bo-ra, Park Ji-sun, Jung Joo-ri	Girls' Generation vs Gag Generation
249	May 17, 2012	Kim Jang-hoon, Tiger JK, Kim Bum-soo	Gods of Performances Special
250	May 24, 2012	Cho Yeo-jeong, Kim Min-jun, Kim Dong-wook	They all promoted for The Concubine
251	May 31, 2012	Kangta & Lee Ji-hoon, Oh Yoon-ah & Ivy	Bosom Friend Special
252	June 7, 2012	Yang Hee-kyung, Jo Yoon-hee, Lee Hee-joon, Oh Yeon-seo, Kang Min-hyuk (CNBLUE)	My Husband Got a Family Special
253	June 14, 2012	Sung Dong-il, Song Sae-byeok, Kim Sung-ryung, Lee Byung-joon	They all promoted for The Suck Up Project: Mr. XXX-Kisser
254	June 21, 2012	Yoo Se-yoon, Jang Dong-min, Yoo Sang-moo, Ahn Seon-young, Kim Sae-rom	
255	June 28, 2012	Yoo Se-yoon, Jang Dong-min, Yoo Sang-moo, Ahn Seon-young, Kim Sae-rom	Happy Together's Late Night Cafeteria first broadcast
256	July 5, 2012	Moon Jeong-hee, Kim Dong-wan (Shinhwa), Shin Bo-ra, Park Sung-kwang, Jung Tae-ho	Brave Guys Special
257	July 12, 2012	Eun Ji-won, Jo Kwon (2AM), Wooyoung (2PM), Sistar (Bora, Dasom), Kangnam (M.I.B)	Blossoming Entertainers Special
258	July 19, 2012	Park Jin-young, Min Hyo-rin, Nichkhun	"5 Million $$$" Star Special
259	August 9, 2012	Cha Tae-hyun, Oh Ji-ho, Ko Chang-seok, Shin Jung-geun	They all promoted for The Grand Heist
260	August 16, 2012	Shin Se-kyung, Kim Sung-soo, Lee Jong-suk	They all promoted for R2B: Return to Base
261	August 23, 2012	Jin Jong-oh, Kim Jang-mi, Shin A-lam, Kim Ji-yeon, Choi Byung-chul, Jo Woo-jong, Lee Soo-geun	London Olympics Star Special
262	August 30, 2012	Hwang Shin-hye, Park Ji-yoon, Dasom (Sistar)	Family Special
263	September 6, 2012	Kim Min-jun, Kim Jun-hyun, Boom, Yang Sang-guk	G4's Friends
264	September 13, 2012	Choi Soo-jong, Park Joo-mi, Lee Young-ah, Kim Yu-seok, Lee Jeong-yong	Dream of the Emperor Special
265	September 20, 2012	Noh Sa-yeon & IU, Lee Gi-kwang & Park Gun-hyung	Unexpected Connections
266	September 27, 2012	Kim Soo-ro, Lee Je-hoon, Kang Ye-won, Kim Yoon-hye	They all promoted for Ghost Sweepers
267	October 4, 2012	Shin Hyun-joon, Kim Jung-eun, Choi Sung-kook, Han Chae-ah	Ohlala Couple Special
268	October 11, 2012	Choo Sung-hoon, Son Dam-bi, Kwanghee (ZE:A), Alice (Hello Venus)	Handsome & Beauty Special
269	October 18, 2012	Kim Nam-joo, Yoo Jun-sang	They were 2 main cast of My Husband Got a Family
270	October 25, 2012	Haha, Park Soo-hong, Song Eun-i, Suzy (Miss A)	Cooking Master Special
271	November 1, 2012	Kim Jong-kook, Kim Yeon-woo, K.Will, Huh Gak, Jung Tae-ho	Autumn Ballad Special
272	November 8, 2012	Jung Kyung-mi, Park Ji-sun, Kim Young-hee, Kim Ji-min	Gag Concert Special
273	November 15, 2012	Yoon Sang-hyun, Park Ha-sun, Kim Tae-woo (g.o.d), Changmin (2AM/Homme)	Quality Voice Special; Two first guests promoted for Love Clinique
274	November 22, 2012	Lee Jong-hyuk, Im Chang-jung, Im Hyung-joon	Musical Le Passe-Muraille Special
275	November 29, 2012	Lee Bo-young, Lee Sang-yoon, Park Hae-jin, Park Jung-ah	Seoyoung, My Daughter Special
276	December 6, 2012	Kim Ah-joong, Ji Sung, Shin So-yul, Kang Kyung-joon	They all promoted for Whatcha Wearin'?
277	December 13, 2012	Jung Joon-ho, Yoo Dong-geun, Kim Min-jung, Yoon Doo-joon (BEAST)	They all promoted for Marrying the Mafia 5: Return of the Mafia
278	December 20, 2012	Yoon Jong-shin, Lena Park, Kim Bum-soo, Jo Jung-chi	Christmas Concert
279	December 27, 2012	Jeong Jun-ha, Park Ji-yoon, Sayuri, Moon Hee-joon	The God of Eating Special

=== 2013 ===
List of episodes in 2013 (episodes 280 – 331)

Episode #	Air Date	Guests	Notes
280	January 3, 2013	Jung Tae-ho, Kim Dae-hee, Kim Jun-hyun, Park Sung-kwang, Park Seong-ho	New Year Special! Entertainment Awards parody (Note: Filming in a police station with the 4 MCs played role as the cops.)
281	January 10, 2013	Im Won-hee, Defconn, Lee Kyung-shil, Kim Kiri, Kim Ji-min, Kim Soo-yong	Talk Battle
282	January 17, 2013	Kim Wan-sun, Baek Ji-young, SNSD (Tiffany, Yuri, Yoona, Hyoyeon)	Dancing Queen Special
283	January 24, 2013	Kim Eung-soo & Kim Eun-seo (daughter), Boom, Park Min-ha, Hong In-gyu & Hong Tae-kyung (son)	Winter Vacation Special
284	January 31, 2013	Kim Tae-won, Lee Yoon-seok, Yang Sang-guk, Sungkyu (Infinite)	Weak Man Special
285	February 7, 2013	Lee Beom-soo, Lee Da-hae, Jang Hyuk, Im Soo-hyang, Yoon Doo-joon (BEAST)	Iris II Special
286	February 14, 2013	Min Ji-young, Lee Si-eun, Choi Young-wan, Lee Jeong-soo	Love and War 2 Special
287	February 21, 2013	Han Chae-young, Jin Goo, Park Ha-sun, Jo Hyun-jae, Han Sunhwa (Secret)	Ad Genius Lee Tae-baek Special
288	February 28, 2013	Park Seong-ho, Yoon Sung-ho, Park Joon-hyung, Jung Jong-cheol, Kwon Jin-young	Gagman Who Left Home
289	March 7, 2013	Cultwo, Jang Woo-hyuk, Kim Jong-min	War of Money Special
290	March 14, 2013	Kim Young-chul, Kim Sung-won, Song Joon-geun, Yenny (Wonder Girls), Robert Holley	Global Brain Special
291	March 21, 2013	Hong Seok-cheon, Kim Kwang-kyu, Kim Kyung-ho, Park Wan-kyu, Seo In-guk	Spring Cleaning Special (Life of Single Men)
292	March 28, 2013	Park Soo-hong, Lee Ji-ae, Kang Sung-beom, Yang Ji-won (SPICA)	Client K Special; Special appearance by lawyer Choi Dan-bi and Kim Jae-cheol
293	April 4, 2013	Hwang Jung-min, Yoo Jun-sang, Yoon Je-moon, Jung Woong-in	They all promoted for Fists of Legend
294	April 11, 2013	Yang Hee-eun, 2AM (Jo Kwon, Jinwoon), K.Will, Dynamic Duo	Sweet Vocals Special
295	April 18, 2013	Lee Dong-wook, Seulong (2AM), Song Ji-hyo	The Fugitive of Joseon Special
296	April 25, 2013	Kim Jun-hyun, Kim Shin-young, Huh Gak, Kim Sung-eun, Park Soo-jin	Food Show Special
297	May 2, 2013	IU, Jo Jung-suk, Yoo In-na, Son Tae-young, Jung Woo	You Are the Best! Special
298	May 9, 2013	Uhm Jung-hwa, Kim Sang-kyung, Kim Na-young, Muzie	Fashionista Special; Two first guests promoted for Montage
299	May 16, 2013	Shinhwa, Choi Hee, Heo Young-saeng (SS501)	Shinhwa and Shinhwa's fan
300	May 23, 2013	Lee Young-ja, Song Eun-i, Kim Sook	300th Special
301	May 30, 2013	Taecyeon (2PM), John Park, Fei (Miss A), Park Jun-gyu, Sam Hammington	Global Special
302	June 6, 2013	Ahn Hye-kyung, Lee Hyori, Yoon Seung-ah, Yoni P.	"Bad Girl" Lee Hyori's Disclosure
303	June 13, 2013	Kim Saeng-min, Lee Joon (MBLAQ), Jo Gap-kyung, Sung Dae-hyun (R.ef), Park Hyun-bin	Penny Pinchers Special
304	June 20, 2013	Kang Leo, Lee Kye-in, Raymon Kim, JK Kim Dong-wook	Chef Special; 1st Anniversary of Late Night Cafeteria
305	June 27, 2013	Do Ji-won, Jeon Mi-seon, Lee Hoon, Kim Tae-hoon	Pure Love Special
306	July 4, 2013	Super Junior (Kyuhyun, Henry), 4Minute (Gayoon, Hyuna), Sistar (Dasom, Soyou)	"What's Your Name?" Special
307	July 11, 2013	Moon Hee-joon, Tony An, Eun Ji-won, Danny Ahn, Chun Myung-hoon	HotSechgodRG Special
308	July 18, 2013	Yoo Sang-chul, Lee Woon-jae, Yang Sang-guk, Kim Ji-ho, Han Joon-hee	Health Food Special
309	July 25, 2013	BEAST (Lee Gi-kwang, Yoseob), Ryu Dam, Noh Woo-jin, Park Hwi-soon	Beastly Idol vs Beast
310	August 1, 2013	Joo Won, Joo Sang-wook, Jung Man-sik, Kim Young-kwang)	Handsome Guy Special; Good Doctor Special
311	August 8, 2013	Kim Ji-min & Shin Bo-ra, Haha & Skull, Koyote (Kim Jong-min & Bbaek Ga)	One Get One Free Special
312	August 15, 2013	Kim Hyun-joong, Jung Joon-young, Muzie, Choi Won-young, Jo Dal-hwan	Late Night Cafeteria Handsome Guy
313	August 22, 2013	ZE:A (Hyungsik, Kwanghee), Jo Jung-chi, Defconn	Unexpected Stars Special; Special appearance by Lim Kim as cooking's helper of Jo Jung-chi
314	August 29, 2013	Kim Young-hee, Ahn Young-mi, Park Ji-sun, Jung Kyung-mi	Woman Power Special
315	September 5, 2013	Clara & Park Eun-ji, Oh Jong-hyuk (Click-B) & Lee Jung	Rivals of the Century Special
316	September 12, 2013	Hong Seok-cheon, John Park, Jung Tae-ho, Lee Jeong-seop, Moon Cheon-sik	Housekeeping Men Special
317	September 19, 2013	Ji Sung, Hwang Jung-eum, Bae Soo-bin, Lee Da-hee	Secret Love Special
318	September 26, 2013	Choi Hee, Gong Seo-young, Jung In-young, Solbi, Hong Jin-young	Charming Ladies Special
319	October 3, 2013	Lee Min-woo, Hong Kyung-in, Jung Eun-pyo, Lee Kye-in	Historical Drama Actors Special
320	October 10, 2013	Park Jun-gyu, Ryu Soo-young, Kim Ji-woo, Kim Da-hyun	Musical Guys and Dolls Special
321	October 17, 2013	Park Joon-geum, Yoo Hye-ri, Kim Byeong-ok, Jung Ho-keun	Tough People Special
322	October 24, 2013	Uhm Tae-woong, So Yi-hyun, Park Joong-hoon, Kim Min-jun	They all promoted for Top Star
323	October 31, 2013	Seo In-guk, Sayuri Fujita, Kwanghee (ZE:A), IU	Overnight Celebrity Special
324	November 7, 2013	Kim Kwang-kyu, Kim Ji-hoon, Chun Myung-hoon, Yook Jung-wan (Rose Motel), Kim Ji-min	Easily Swayed Celebrities Special
325	November 14, 2013	Miss A (Suzy, Fei), Jung Eun-ji (Apink), Minah (Girl's Day)	Girl Group and Uncle Fans
326	November 21, 2013	DJ DOC (Jung Jae-yong, Kim Chang-ryul, Lee Ha-neul), Hyolyn (Sistar), Lena Park, Yoon Do-hyun	Kings of Performances
327	November 28, 2013	Han Eun-jung, Seo Ji-seok, Park Jin-young, K.Will	People with Unexpected Charms
328	December 5, 2013	Lee Beom-soo, Yoon Shi-yoon, Ryu Jin, Yoona (SNSD)	Prime Minister and I Special
329	December 12, 2013	Lee Hwi-jae, Tablo, Jang Hyun-sung, Choo Sung-hoon	The Return of Superman Special
330	December 19, 2013	Kim Je-dong, Oh Sang-jin, Siwan (ZE:A), Son Jin-young	Forever Alone Special
331	December 26, 2013	Sung Si-kyung, Jung Joon-young, Mino (Free Style), Haha	Guys Who Are So Honest It Can Be Rude Special

=== 2014 ===
List of episodes in 2014 (episodes 332 – 378)

Episode #	Air Date	Guests	Notes
332	January 2, 2014	Kim Jun-ho, Kim Jun-hyun, Kim Min-kyung, Kim Ji-min, Yoo Min-sang	2013 KBS Entertainment Awards Winner
333	January 9, 2014	Kim Sung-kyun, Seo Ha-joon, Dohee (Tiny-G), Han Joo-wan, Subin (Dal Shabet)	2014 Rising Star Special
334	January 16, 2014	Lee So-ra, Choi Daniel, Jo Jung-chi, Hareem, Jang Yoon-ju	KBS Cool FM DJs Special
335	January 23, 2014	Jackie Chan, Choi Siwon (Super Junior), Narsha (Brown Eyed Girls)	Jackie Chan and Friends Special
336	January 30, 2014	Lee Kyung-shil & Gayoon (4Minute), Kim Shin-young & Huh Gak, Kim Hyun-sook & Min (Miss A)	Look-alike Special
337	February 6, 2014	Jeong Jun-ha, Song Eun-i, Gong Hyung-jin, Djamilya Abdullaeva, Sungkyu (Infinite)	Rapid Aging Special
338	February 27, 2014	Oh Hyun-kyung, Lee Tae-ran, Lee Yoon-ji, Jo Sung-ha, Oh Man-seok, Han Joo-wan	Wang's Family Special
339	March 6, 2014	Kim Kwang-kyu, Kim Hee-sun, Ryu Seung-soo, Ok Taecyeon, Choi Hwa-jeong	Wonderful Days Special
340	March 13, 2014	Raymon Kim, Lee Seung-hoon, Yoon Hyung-bin, ZE:A (Kwanghee, Minwoo)	Springtime Stamina Special
341	March 20, 2014	Hong Jin-kyung, Jo Se-ho, Nam Chang-hee, HotSechGodRG (Moon Hee-joon, Eun Ji-won, Danny Ahn)	The Trio Special (Note: Hong Jin-kyung, Jo Se-ho and Nam Chang-hee co-starred in SBS's My Love from the Star.)
342	March 27, 2014	Lee Kye-in, Park Jun-gyu, Henry (Super Junior), Hong Seok-cheon, Soryong (Tasty)	Bluff Special
343	April 3, 2014	Kim Kang-woo, Lee Si-young, Um Ki-joon, Han Eun-jung	Golden Cross Special
344	April 10, 2014	Kim Sung-kyung, Seo Tae-hoon, Song So-hee, Junggigo, Hong Jin-ho	Who Are You?
345	May 8, 2014	Robert Holley, Sam Hammington, Sam Okyere, Fabien	Korean Dream Special
346	May 15, 2014	Jo Yoon-ho, Jeong Jun-ha, Yoon Doo-joon (BEAST), Lee Sang-hwa, NC.A	The End Special
347	May 22, 2014	Park Nam-jung & Park Si-eun (daughter), Kim Dae-hee & Kim Hyun-oh (daughter), Jung Jong-chul & Jung Si-hoo (son)	Family Month Special
348	May 29, 2014	Cha Seung-won, Jang Jin, Oh Jung-se, Go Kyung-pyo	They all promoted for Man on High Heels
349	June 5, 2014	Lee Min-ki, Park Sung-woong, Kim Dong-hyun, Jang Dong-min, Muzie	Manly Men Special
350	June 12, 2014	Parents of twins (Shoo, Park Eun-hye, Hwang Hye-young, Yoon Il-sang); Twins (Wink, Lee Sang-ho & Lee Sang-min)	Twins Special
351	June 19, 2014	Kim Hak-do, Bae Chil-soo, Jung Sung-ho, Jo Se-ho, Ahn So-mi	Vocal Imitator Special; Special appearance by Kim Heung-gook
352	June 26, 2014	Ga Ae-ran, Do Kyung-wan, Jo Woo-jong, Jo Hang-ri	KBS Announcers Special
353	July 3, 2014	Yoo Dong-geun, Cho Jae-hyun, Park Yeong-gyu, Seon Dong-hyuk, Lee Gwang-gi	Jeong Do-jeon Special
354	July 10, 2014	Park Soo-hong, Nam Hee-suk, Choi Seung-kyung, Kim Soo-yong	The 7 KBS Legendary Comedians
355	July 17, 2014	Kim Shin-young, Cheon Yi-seul, Jiyeon (T-ara), Lady Jane, Kim Na-hee, Park Gi-ryang	Goddess Special
356	July 24, 2014	Cultwo, Sam Hammington & Henry (Super Junior), B1A4 (Baro, Jinyoung)	Combination Special
357	July 31, 2014	Lee Young-pyo, Jo Woo-jong, Jung Ji-won, Jung Joon-ho, Kim Heung-gook	The Talented Special; Special appearance by Sean (Jinusean); Last episode of Shin Bong-sun and Heo Kyung-hwan as hosts
358	August 7, 2014	Lee Yoo-ri, Park Ip-seon, Christina Confalonieri, Lee Guk-joo	Queen of Housework Special; "Carbon Copies" (Jo Se-ho and Kim Shin-young) joined as hosts
359	August 14, 2014	Shin Sung-woo, Kim Kwang-kyu, Joon Park (G.o.d), Ji Sang-ryeol, Oh Sang-jin	Beautiful Singles Special
360	August 21, 2014	Ryohei Otani, Enes Kaya, Sam Okyere, Choi Yeo-jin, Clara, Yura (Girl's Day)	Hot People Special
361	August 28, 2014	Choi Hong-man, Kim Se-jin, Do Kyung-wan, Hwang Hyun-hee, Hong Jin-ho, Sunny (SNSD)	Long Legs & Short Legs Special
362	September 4, 2014	Park Joon-geum & Choi Jin-hyuk, Park Kyung-lim & Park Soo-hong, Yewon (Jewelry) & Kwanghee (ZE:A)	Blood Siblings Special
363	September 11, 2014	Lee Soon-jae, Shin Goo, Cho Jae-hyun, Lee Do-yeop	Gods of Acting Special
364	September 18, 2014	Geum Bo-ra, Park Joo-mi, Jeon Hye-bin, Oh Yeon-seo, Kim Sae-ron	Actress Generation Special; They represented each age group from the 50s down to the teenagers
365	September 25, 2014	Shin Hyun-joon, Park Eun-young, Kim Saeng-min, Son Dam-bi, Yoon Park, Hyungsik (ZE:A), Seo Kang-joon, Nam Ji-hyun	Family Special; Three first guests was the hosts and reporter of Entertainment Weekly; Five guests remaining co-starred in What Happens to My Family?
366	October 2, 2014	Jeon So-min, Son Ho-jun, Huh Gak, Jang Yun-jeong, Han Jin	Dramatic Turnaround Special
367	October 9, 2014	Seo Taeji	Seo Taeji Special
368	October 16, 2014	Yoon Kye-sang (G.o.d), Go Joon-hee, Lee Mi-do, Park Beom-soo, Jo Jung-chi, Jung-in	The Man and The Woman Special; Four first guests promoted for Red Carpet
369	October 23, 2014	Lee Young-don, Seo Jang-hoon, Sayuri Fujita, Raymon Kim	Gourmet Food Special
370	October 30, 2014	Kim Na-young, Shin Joo-hwan, Ahn Jae-hyun, Hong Seok-cheon, Joo Won, Kim Ji-min	Fashion People Special
371	November 6, 2014	Kim Jong-min, Defconn, Jang Dong-min, Yoo Sang-moo, Fabien, Julian Quintart	The Best and The Worst Special
372	November 13, 2014	Son Yeon-jae, Nam Hyun-hee, Lee Yong-dae, Kim Cheong-yong	National Athlete Special
373	November 20, 2014	Kwon Oh-joong, Ki Tae-young, Yoon Min-soo, Jin Tae-hyun, Heo Kyung-hwan	The Lucky Men Special
374	November 27, 2014	Lee Sung-jae, Seo In-guk, Jo Yoon-hee, Kim Gyu-ri, Shin Sung-rok	The King's Face Special
375	December 4, 2014	Kim Yoo-jung, Kim Tae-woo (G.o.d), Kim Jun-hyun, Hong Jin-young, Fei (Miss A)	Eat and Eat Special
376	December 11, 2014	Kim Jun-ho, Song Kyung-ah, Seungyeon (KARA), Han Chae-young	Hallyu Special
377	December 18, 2014	Ji Suk-jin, Cho Yeo-jeong, Clara, Park Gi-ryang, Jang Su-won	I Am The Best Special
378	December 25, 2014	So Yoo-jin, Shoo, Kim So-eun, Youngji (KARA), Kyuhyun (Super Junior)	Christmas Special

=== 2015 ===
List of episodes in 2015 (episodes 379 – 429)

Episode #	Air Date	Guests	Notes
379	January 1, 2015	Yoo Ji-tae & Cha Ye-ryun, Kim Soo-yong & Kim Sook, Gikwang (BEAST) & Gayoon (4Minute)	The Celebrity Sibling-like Friends Special
380	January 8, 2015	Kim Ji-hoon, Lee Jang-woo, Han Groo, Lee Chae-young, Lee Sung-kyung	The Hot Men and Women Special
381	January 15, 2015	Park Geun-hyung & Yoon Sang-hoon, Hong Sung-heon & Hong Hwa-ri, Kim Jae-kyung (Rainbow) & Kim Jae-hyun (N.Flying)	The Family Special
382	January 22, 2015	Yu Oh-seong, Yeo Jin-goo, Lee Kye-in, Jo Woo-jong, Jackson (GOT7), Kim In-seok	Manly Men vs Chatterboxes Special
383	January 29, 2015	Seo Jang-hoon, Lee Kyou-hyuk, Choi Jung-yoon, Kim Jung-nam (Turbo), Hani (EXID)	The Rookie Special
384	February 5, 2015	Moon Hee-joon & Sungjae (BtoB), Lee Moon-sik & Choi Jung-won, Kangnam (M.I.B) & Sayuri	The Hardship Special
385	February 12, 2015	Ku Hye-sun, Ahn Jae-hyun, Ji Jin-hee, Seolhyun (AOA), Kwanghee (ZE:A)	The Obsessive People Special.; Three first guests co-starred in Blood
386	February 19, 2015	Heechul (Super Junior), Park Eun-hye, Lee Bong-won, Lee Young-ah, Zhang Yu'an	New Years in My Hometown Special
387	February 26, 2015	Kim Ji-seok, Kim Hye-eun, Song Jae-rim, Lee Ha-na, Kim Ye-won	Self-Maintenance Special.; Four first guests co-starred in Unkind Ladies
388	March 5, 2015	Kim Eung-soo, Shin Soo-ji, Alberto Mondi, Jang Seo-hee, Choi Yeo-jin	Self-made Star Special
389	March 12, 2015	Kim Sung-joo, g.o.d (Joon Park, Danny Ahn), Seok Joo-il, Lee Kyu-han, Jo Dong-hyuk	The Bromance Special
390	March 19, 2015	Kim Sung-eun, Raymon Kim, Byul, Shim Hye-jin, Tiger JK	Romantic Special
391	March 26, 2015	Kim Mi-ryeo, Kim Ji-young, Byun Jung-soo, Lee Yoon-jin, Lee Hye-won	The Working Mom Special
392	April 2, 2015	Suzy (Miss A), Seo Woo, Yoo Seung-ok, Jessi, Choi Hyun-seok	The Host's Guest Special
393	April 9, 2015	Kang Ye-won, Kim Min-kyo, Oh Ji-ho, Hong Seok-cheon	The Well-connected Stars Special
394	April 23, 2015	Kang Kyun-sung (Noel) & Kahi, Kim Sung-soo & Baek Ji-young, Bae Geu-rin & Han Go-eun	Perfect Partner Special
395	April 30, 2015	Kim Young-chul & Jung Sung-hwa, Jinusean, Amber (f(x)) & Henry (Super Junior)	Oh! Brother Special
396	May 7, 2015	Kim Bum-soo & Ahn Moon-sook, Park Joo-mi, Jo Kwon (2AM) & Gain (Brown Eyed Girls)	The Dangerous Couples Special; Park Myeong-su appeared at a guest seat beside Park Joo-mi, they starred on Brave Family as husband and wife
397	May 14, 2015	Kwak Jung-eun, Lee Guk-joo, Lee Bon, Lee Hyun-joo, Hwang Shin-hye	The Queen Special to Celebrate May.; Park Myeong-su was replaced by Jo Woo-jong in this episode
398	May 21, 2015	BIGBANG	BIGBANG Special
399	May 28, 2015	Kim Soo-mi, Bae Jong-ok, Byun Jung-soo, Yoon Hyun-sook	Kim Soo-mi and the Girls Special (Note: All four actress became the best friend after they co-starred in MBC's Bravo, My Love!.)
400	June 4, 2015	Ryu Seung-soo & Park Han-byul, Lee Seung-chul & Jung Joon-young	The Teachers and Students Special
401	June 11, 2015	Goo Hara (KARA), Kim Soo-young, Shin Sung-woo, Yoo Min-sang, Lee Hyun-woo, Jin Goo	Men and Women in Miracle Special
402	June 18, 2015	Kim Jae-young, Seo In-guk, Lee Chun-hee, Jang Na-ra, Choi Won-young	Hello Monster Special
403	June 25, 2015	Kim Dong-wook, Son Ho-jun, Im Won-hee, Kim Poong, Yoo Byung-jae	Heart-throbs Special; Three first guests promoted for Three Summer Night
404	July 2, 2015	Park Jun-gyu, Lee Deok-hwa, Lee Hong-ryul, Heo Soo-kyung, Kwanghee (ZE:A)	Summer Special: The Legendary MCs; Guess and Get Lucky: chef Lee Yeon-bok (Note: New format of Late Night Cafeteria: The guests answer some funny questions where the winner gets to eat some tasty food served up by a famous chef or a famous artist who is well-cooking.)
405	July 9, 2015	Sam Kim, Shim Young-soon, Lee Yeon-bok, Lee Wook-jeong, Jungyup (Brown Eyed Soul), Seunghee (DIA)	Summer Special: Chefs' Cafeteria (Note: Seunghee only appeared on episode 406.)
406	July 16, 2015	Sam Kim, Shim Young-soon, Lee Yeon-bok, Lee Wook-jeong, Jungyup (Brown Eyed Soul), Seunghee (DIA)	Summer Special: Chefs' Cafeteria
407	July 23, 2015	Do Kyung-wan & Jang Yun-jeong, Noh Sa-yeon & Lee Moo-song, Kim Ji-woo & Raymon Kim	Summer Special: Happily Married Couples; Guess and Get Lucky: chef Lee Yeon-bok
408	July 30, 2015	Seo In-young & Seo Hae-young (sister), Shin Sung-rok & Shin Je-rok (brother), Oh Sang-jin & Oh Min-jeong (sister)	Summer Special: Siblings of Superior Genes; Guess and Get Lucky: chef Sam Kim
409	August 6, 2015	Kangnam (M.I.B) & Lee Hyun-yi, Kim Won-jun & Lee Ah-hyun, Yoo Sang-moo & Jang Do-yeon	Female Friends Special; Guess and Get Lucky: chef Lee Yeon-bok
410	August 13, 2015	Kim Sung-kyung, Kim Jeong-hoon, Ahn Nae-sang, Woo Hyeon, Hwang Seok-jeong	Back to School Special; Guess and Get Lucky: chef Lee Yeon-bok
411	August 20, 2015	Kim Soo-ro, Kang Sung-jin, Kim Min-kyo, Nam Bo-ra, Park Gun-hyung	Bossy Suro and His Underdog Friends Special.; Guess and Get Lucky: chef Lee Yeon-bok
412	August 27, 2015	Choi Daniel, Lim Eun-kyung, Kim Dong-wook, B1A4 (Gongchan, Sandeul), Jeong Jun-ha	Cheerful Guys Special; Two first guests promoted for Untouchable Lawman.; Guess and Get Lucky: chef Oh Se-deuk
413	September 3, 2015	Noh Yoo-min, Yoon Min-soo, In Gyo-jin, Joo Young-hoon	Devoted Husband Special; Guess and Get Lucky: chef Hong Seok-cheon
414	September 10, 2015	Kim Sae-rom, Lee Chan-oh, Joon Park (g.o.d), Park Hyun-bin, Park Si-eun	Newlyweds Special; Guess and Get Lucky: chef Lee Chan-oh
415	September 17, 2015	Kim Yoo-ri & Ryohei Otani, Lee Hong-gi (F.T. Island) & Mina Fujii, Choi Hee & Fabien	My Friend is a Foreigner Special; Guess and Get Lucky: chef Nam Sung-ryeol
416	September 24, 2015	Kwon Sang-woo & Sung Dong-il, Park Eun-young & Lady Jane	Best Buddies Special.; Two first guests promoted for The Accidental Detective; Guess and Get Lucky: Fei (Miss A)
417	October 1, 2015	Noh Hyun-hee, Yoon Taek, Jo Young-goo, Jo Jeong-min, Hong Jin-young	Idols of Senior Citizens Special; Guess and Get Lucky: Fei (Miss A); Last episode of Park Mi-sun and Kim Shin-young as host, the sauna format with the late night cafeteria were also ended
418	October 8, 2015	Ji Suk-jin, Gary	Ji Suk-jin and Gary Special: The Discovery of Cleanup; First episode in the new format, Jun Hyun-moo and Kim Poong joined as hosts, alongside Yoo Jae-suk, Park Myeong-su and Jo Se-ho
419	October 15, 2015	Jo Jung-suk, Bae Seong-woo	They all promoted for The Exclusive: Beat the Devil's Tattoo
420	October 22, 2015	Eugene & Lee Sang-woo	They all co-starred in All About My Mom; Oh Min-suk, Choi Tae-joon and Jo Bo-ah joined in the first half, Shoo and Shim Hyung-tak appeared in the second half
421	October 29, 2015	Sung Yu-ri, Kim Sung-kyun, Ji Jin-hee	They all promoted for Summer Snow
422	November 5, 2015	Kim Min-jung, Park Eun-hye, Jang Hyuk, Jung Tae-woo, Han Chae-ah	Celebrities with Long Careers Special; They all co-starred in The Merchant: Gaekju 2015
423	November 12, 2015	Shiho Yano, Sayuri, Byun Jeong-min	Shiho Yano Special; Special appearance by Shiho Yano's father-in-law Choo Gye-yi
424	November 19, 2015	Kim Eana, Park Na-rae, Yoo Jae-hwan, Ha Seok-jin, Hong Jin-ho	MCs Loving People Special
425	November 26, 2015	Kim Heung-gook, Solbi, Sojin (Girl's Day), Yoon So-hee, Lee Kye-in	Image Makeover Special
426	December 3, 2015	Eric Nam, Stephanie Lee, Yoon Sang, Lee Hyun-woo, John Park	I Am From America Special; Park Myeong-su was replaced by Defconn in this episode
427	December 10, 2015	Kim Kyung-ran, Seo Tae-hwa, Seo Tae-hoon, Jin Bora, Fei (Miss A)	The Unlucky Nine Special
428	December 17, 2015	Kim Seung-woo, Kim Il-joong, Jang Hang-jun, Choi Hyun-seok	Family Man Special
429	December 24, 2015	Kyung Soo-jin, Kim Do-kyun, Hwang Jae-geun, iKON (Bobby, B.I), Sandara Park (2NE1)	Singles' Christmas Party Special; The guests were invited to Jo Se-ho's house for a Christmas party

=== 2016 ===
List of episodes in 2016 (episodes 430 – 479)

Episode #	Air Date	Guests	Notes
430	January 7, 2016	Turbo (Kim Jong-kook, Kim Jung-nam, Mikey), Chae Yeon, T-ara (Eunjung, Hyomin)	Conquerors of the Continent Special
431	January 14, 2016	Moon Se-yoon, Yezi (Fiestar), Lee Yoo-young, Lee Chun-soo, Hwang Chi-yeul	"We Should Have Been Nicer" Special
432	January 21, 2016	Lee Sung-min, Kim Na-young, Jung Joo-ri, Lee Hee-joon	The Addicts Special
433	January 28, 2016	Hwang Jung-min, Kim Won-hae, Jung Sang-hoon, Baek Joo-hee	Glorious Return Special
434	February 4, 2016	Gummy, Gong Hyun-joo, Kim Sook, Song Eun-i, Lee Hye-jeong	Girl Crushes Special
435	February 11, 2016	So Yoo-jin, Wang Bit-na, Im Soo-hyang, Shin Hye-sun, Kwon Oh-joong	You Rock Special
436	February 18, 2016	Seo Yu-ri, Kim Jung-min, Uhm Hyun-kyung, Lee Soo-min, Lee Soo-ji	Here to Take Over Special
437	February 25, 2016	Jang Dong-min, Heo Kyung-hwan, Oh Na-mi, Kim Ji-min, Park Hwi-soon	God Is Fair Special; Last episode of Kim Poong as host
438	March 3, 2016	Sung Si-kyung, Lee Guk-joo, Son Yeo-eun, Cheetah	Single Dweller Special; Uhm Hyun-kyung joined as host; Beginning of the new format: Happy House
439	March 10, 2016	Namkoong Min, Jo Eun-sook, Park Ha-na, Kim Min-kyung	The Villain Special
440	March 17, 2016	Kim Joon-ho, Cha Tae-hyun, Defconn, Kim Jong-min, Jung Joon-young	2 Days & 1 Night Special – "Remember the members forever"
441	March 24, 2016	Choi Tae-joon, Zico (Block B), Shin Dong-woo, MC Gree, Navi, Kim Young-hee	Close Friends Special
442	March 31, 2016	Kang Ye-won, Song Jae-hee, Lee Sang-yoon, Han Bo-reum, Hyojung (Oh My Girl)	Hidden Charms Special
443	April 7, 2016	Hwang Chi-yeul, Zhang Yu'an, Lee Se-jin, Do Sang-woo, Jo Tae-kwan	Men of the Sun Special
444	April 14, 2016	Choi Sung-won, Girl's Day (Hyeri, Yura), Lee Se-young	Stars of the Spring Special
445	April 21, 2016	Lee Hi, Sungjae (BtoB), Park Ji-yoon, Bong Man-dae	Ambitious Stars Special
446	April 28, 2016	Kim Won-jun, Lee Eun-gyeol, Park Young-jin, Lim Yo-hwan	Newlywed Husband Special
447	May 5, 2016	Lee Je-hoon, Kim Sung-kyun, Moon Hee-kyung, Apink (Jung Eun-ji, Kim Nam-joo)	Dominators Special; Two first guests promoted for Phantom Detective
448	May 12, 2016	Ji Sang-ryeol, Eric Nam, Ji Seung-hyun, Han Hee-jun, Kim Ji-sook (Rainbow)	"Been Through a Lot" Special
449	May 19, 2016	Kim Heung-gook, Kim Hee-won, Yang Ik-june, Kim Go-eun	The Best and the Worst Special
450	May 26, 2016	Lee Mal-nyun & Park Tae-joon, Nam Chang-hee, AOA (Seolhyun, Chanmi)	1+1 Special
451	June 2, 2016	Lee Dong-joon & Lee Il-min (son), Akdong Musician (siblings), Jeon So-mi (I.O.I) & Matthew Douma (father)	"There's Nothing More Important Than Family"
452	June 9, 2016	Jeon So-min, Hong Yoon-hwa, Jung Da-bin, Ko Won-hee, Lee Young-jin	The Queens of Variety Show
453	June 16, 2016	I.O.I (Choi Yoo-jung, Jung Chae-yeon, Im Na-young), Bada (S.E.S.), Park Jung-ah, JeA (Brown Eyed Girls)	The New and the Old
454	June 23, 2016	Lee Sang-min, Lee Soo-geun, Moon Ji-ae, Jun Hyo-seong (Secret)	The Rehabilitation Project
455	June 30, 2016	Sung Hoon & Shin Hye-sun, Song Jae-hee & Seo Yoo-jung, Tony An (H.O.T.) & Kim Jae-duc (Sechs Kies)	Unique Couples Special; Two first guests co-starred in Five Enough
456	July 7, 2016	EXO (Suho, Chanyeol, Chen), Jin Ji-hee, Seo Shin-ae, Kim Hwan-hee	Trusty Young Idols and Actors Special
457	July 14, 2016	Sana (Twice), Sorn (CLC), Cheng Xiao (Cosmic Girls), Henry (Super Junior-M), John Park, Kangnam (M.I.B)	Global Entertainers Special
458	July 21, 2016	Hong Seok-cheon, Wax, Twice (Tzuyu, Jihyo), Son Dae-sik, Park Dae-yoon	Fake Friends Special
459	July 28, 2016	Hyuna (4Minute), Yong Jun-hyung (BEAST), Song Won-geun, Park Seung-geon, Lee Soo-min (C.I.V.A)	King of Good Cheer and Talent Special
460	August 4, 2016	Lee Young-pyo, Choi Byung-chul, Kim Heung-gook, Kim Jung-min, Eunkwang (BtoB)	Fatal Old Men Special
461	August 11, 2016	Sunny (SNSD), Solji (EXID), Chahee (Melody Day), Solbin (Laboum), Yerin (GFriend), Kim Se-jeong (I.O.I/Gugudan)	"Train to Entertainment"
462	August 25, 2016	Baek Ji-young, Lee Ji-hye, Crush, Loco, DinDin	The Amazing Groups Special
463	September 1, 2016	Gu Bon-seung, Kim Sang-hyuk (Click-B), Kim Hyun-chul, Heo Jung-min, Heo Young-ji	Frozen in Time
464	September 8, 2016	Jeong Jun-ha, San E, C Jamm, Jessi	Show Me the Swag
465	September 15, 2016	Yoon Park, Wheein (Mamamoo), Park So-hyun, Choi Gwi-hwa, Hong Hyun-hee	Do You Know About Chuseok?
466	September 22, 2016	Jung Hye-sung, Sunwoo Sun, Yoo So-young, Jeong Da-eun, Lady Jane	Jun-Park War
467	September 29, 2016	Cha In-pyo, Jo Yoon-hee, Ra Mi-ran, Lee Dong-gun	The Gentlemen of Wolgyesu Tailor Shop Special
468	October 6, 2016	Koyote (Kim Jong-min, Shin Ji), Chun Myung-hoon, Kim Ye-won, Hong Jin-young	Shin-Cheon-Jong-Hong-Ye Special
469	October 13, 2016	Se7en, Kang Kyun-sung (Noel), Sleepy (Untouchable), Cha Eun-woo (ASTRO), Cheng Xiao (Cosmic Girls)	Factual Violence
470	October 20, 2016	SHINee, Lee Guk-joo, Kim Ji-min	SHINee vs Sunny; Beginning of the new corner "One Picture is Worth a Thousand Words" in the second half of each episode, in which comics artist Kian84 joined as a long-term guest.
471	October 27, 2016	Han Dong-geun, Wheesung, Kim Kyung-ho, Lee Se-joon (Yurisangja)	I Want to Hear Your Voice Only
472	November 3, 2016	Kwak Dong-yeon, Han Soo-yeon, Ahn Se-ha, Lee Joon-hyuk, Jinyoung (B1A4)	Love in the Moonlight Special
473	November 10, 2016	Hwang Woo-seul-hye, Goo Jae-yi, Heize, Kyungri (Nine Muses), Monika (Badkiz)	Actresses vs Divas
474	November 17, 2016	Yoon Jung-soo, Park Na-rae, Park Hwan-hee, Park Jin-joo, Huihyeon (DIA)	Fantastic Fun
475	November 24, 2016	Kim Gun-mo, Noh Sa-yeon, Noh Sa-bong, Ji Sang-ryeol, UJi (BESTie)	Meeting That Went Wrong
476	December 1, 2016	Guckkasten (Ha Hyun-woo, Lee Jung-gil), K.Will, Brian Joo (Fly to the Sky), Microdot	Kings of the Genre
477	December 8, 2016	Lee Dae-ho, Hyun Joo-yup, Moon Se-yoon, Kim Il-joong, Lee Dong-yeop	The Great Men
478	December 15, 2016	Kim Soo-yong, Yoon Son-ha, Jang Youngran, Baek Do-bin, Jung Shi-ah	The Stories of Married Couples
479	December 22, 2016	Lee Sang-min, Solbi, Heo Ji-woong, DinDin, Cao Lu (Fiestar)	The Avengers of Variety Shows Special

=== 2017 ===
List of episodes in 2017 (episodes 480 – 519)

Episode #	Air Date	Guests		Notes
480	January 5, 2017	Yang Se-hyung & Yang Se-chan, Zico (Block B) & ₩uNo		Brothers Special: "Who's Your Mother?"
481	January 12, 2017	Shinhwa		"Shinhwa is Back" Special
482	January 19, 2017	Kim Eung-soo, Park Joon-geum, Moon Hee-kyung, Lee Cheol-min		The New Rising Stars in Variety Shows
483	January 26, 2017	Kim Yong-man, Park Soo-hong, Kim Soo-yong, Ji Suk-jin, Son Heon-soo		Talk Dream Team
484	February 2, 2017	Kim Yong-man, Park Soo-hong, Kim Soo-yong, Ji Suk-jin, Son Heon-soo		Talk Dream Team
485	February 9, 2017	Choi Min-yong, Kim Joon-ho, Jung Myung-hoon, Haha, Zizo		"Your Friends' Name" Special
486	February 16, 2017	Lee Kye-in, Park Jung-soo, Kim Young-chul, Song Eun-i, Hyun Woo, Lee Se-young		"Oh, My Female Friend" Special
487	February 23, 2017	Kang Ha-neul, Han Jae-young, Kim Seul-gi, Ha Jae-sook, Super Junior (Shindong, Leeteuk)		Cooperative Assignment for Variety Shows Special
488	March 2, 2017	Park Jin-hee, Oh Yeon-ah, Jang So-yeon, Nam Bo-ra, Cho Hye-jung, Heo Young-ji		Actress Special; Ending of "Happy House" format and "One Picture is Worth a Thousand Words" segment
489	March 9, 2017	Eugene, Do Kyung-wan, Henry (Super Junior-M)		15th Happy Together Anniversary Special – "Happy Together Friends"; Eugene appeared as a special MC alongside Yoo Jae-suk
490	March 16, 2017	Son Hyun-joo, Lee Soo-geun, Kim Sang-ho, Heechul (Super Junior), John Park, Yoo Byung-jae, Nara (Hello Venus)		15th Happy Together Anniversary Special – "Don't Laugh In The Sauna!"; Lee Soo-geun and Nara left early due to other schedules
491	March 23, 2017	Son Hyun-joo, Lee Soo-geun, Kim Sang-ho, Heechul (Super Junior), John Park, Yoo Byung-jae, Nara (Hello Venus)		15th Happy Together Anniversary Special – "Don't Laugh In The Sauna!"; Lee Soo-geun and Nara left early due to other schedules
491	March 23, 2017	Girl's Day (Hyeri, Yura), Hani (EXID), Kim Se-jeong (I.O.I/Gugudan), Jeon So-mi (I.O.I)		15th Happy Together Anniversary Special – "Metal Tray Karaoke Room"; Jo Se-ho and Uhm Hyun-kyung were absent due to limited filming space
492	March 30, 2017	Girl's Day (Hyeri, Yura), Hani (EXID), Kim Se-jeong (I.O.I/Gugudan), Jeon So-mi (I.O.I)		15th Happy Together Anniversary Special – "Metal Tray Karaoke Room"; Jo Se-ho and Uhm Hyun-kyung were absent due to limited filming space
493	April 6, 2017	Shin Goo, Yoon Je-moon, Jung So-min, Lee Il-hwa, Lee Mi-do		Shin Goo and the Kids Special; They all promoted for Dad Is Daughter; Beginning of the new format: "Happy Together Town, Happy Together"
494	April 13, 2017	Lee Yoo-ri, Ryu Soo-young, Min Jin-woong, Lee Young-eun, Dongjun (ZE:A), Choi Jung-won		The King of Viewer Rating Special; Three first guests co-star in My Father Is Strange; Three remaining guests co-star in Still Loving You
495	April 20, 2017	Baek Il-seob, Kwak Si-yang, Joon Park (g.o.d), Tony An (H.O.T.), Seolhyun (AOA)		Celebrities and Their Pets Special
496	April 27, 2017	Jeon Hye-bin, Jang Young-nam, Kim Byeong-ok, Lee Si-eon, Tae In-ho, Jeon Seok-ho		Scene-stealer Special
497	May 4, 2017	You Hee-yeol, Jung Jae-hyung, Peppertones (Shin Jae-pyung, Lee Jang-won), Jung Seung-hwan, Sam Kim, Kwon Jin-ah, Lee Jin-ah		Immortal Happy Together Pop Star Special
498	May 11, 2017	Namkoong Min, Junho (2PM), Twice (Tzuyu, Sana), Wang Ji-won, Hwang Seung-eon		I Rule This Field Special
499	May 18, 2017	Kim Eui-sung, Gu Bon-seung, Ji Sang-ryeol, Roy Kim, Henry (Super Junior-M), Ahn Hyo-seop		Online Boyfriends Special
500	May 25, 2017	Jo In-sung		Happy Together 3 – 500th Episode Special; "I Miss You, My Friend" Special; Kim Soo-yong, Kim Yong-man and Ji Suk-jin joined as hosts; Special voice appearances via phone (except those who have come) by: Ep. 500: Shin Dong-yup, Yoni P, Park Soo-hong, Lee Kwang-soo, Lee Chun-hee, Yoo In-na, Song Joong-ki and Lee Hyori; Ep. 501: Park Bo-gum, Lee Kyung-kyu, Um Ki-joon and Jeong Jun-ha; Park Soo-hong, Lee Myung-hoon and Lee Jin-ho appeared at the end of episode 501
501	June 1, 2017	Jo In-sung, DinDin, Yoo Byung-jae, Jo Bo-ah, IU, Choi Yoon-young, Park Kyung (Block B), Oh Sang-jin, Song Jae-hee, Guillaume Patry		Happy Together 3 – 500th Episode Special; "I Miss You, My Friend" Special; Kim Soo-yong, Kim Yong-man and Ji Suk-jin joined as hosts; Special voice appearances via phone (except those who have come) by: Ep. 500: Shin Dong-yup, Yoni P, Park Soo-hong, Lee Kwang-soo, Lee Chun-hee, Yoo In-na, Song Joong-ki and Lee Hyori; Ep. 501: Park Bo-gum, Lee Kyung-kyu, Um Ki-joon and Jeong Jun-ha; Park Soo-hong, Lee Myung-hoon and Lee Jin-ho appeared at the end of episode 501
Episode #	Air Date	Guests		Notes
Episode #	Air Date	Happy Together Town	Legendary Big Mouth	Notes
502	June 8, 2017	Lee Deok-hwa, Cha Tae-hyun, Yoon Shi-yoon, Kim Min-jae	Kim Sung-ryung	"Happy Together Town" (HTT): Hit the Top Special; Park Soo-hong joined as host; Yoo Jae-suk hosted a new segment, "Legendary Big Mouth", exclusively with Kim Soo-yong, Kim Yong-man, Ji Suk-jin and Park Soo-hong; "Legendary Big Mouth" (LBM): Dangerous Invitation Special (Korean: 위험한 초대; RR: wiheomhan chodae; 2002)
503	June 15, 2017	Lee Deok-hwa, Cha Tae-hyun, Yoon Shi-yoon, Kim Min-jae	Kim Sung-ryung	"Happy Together Town" (HTT): Hit the Top Special; Park Soo-hong joined as host; Yoo Jae-suk hosted a new segment, "Legendary Big Mouth", exclusively with Kim Soo-yong, Kim Yong-man, Ji Suk-jin and Park Soo-hong; "Legendary Big Mouth" (LBM): Dangerous Invitation Special (Korean: 위험한 초대; RR: wiheomhan chodae; 2002)
504	June 22, 2017	Myung Se-bin, Bada (S.E.S.), Hwang Chi-yeul, Jung Eun-ji (Apink)	Yoon Bo-mi (Apink), HIGHLIGHT (Doojoon, Dongwoon)	"HTT": The Golden Days of Our Lives Special; "LBM": Scary Word Relay Special (Korean: 공포의 쿵쿵따; RR: gongpoui kungkungtta; 2002)
505	June 29, 2017	Song Jae-hee, Choi Yoon-young, Guillaume Patry, Lee Myung-hoon, Lee Jin-ho	Yoon Bo-mi (Apink), HIGHLIGHT (Doojoon, Dongwoon)	"HTT": "I Am Sorry, My Friend" Special; "LBM": Scary Word Relay Special (cont.)
506	July 6, 2017	Yoon Jong-shin, Jo Jung-chi, Eddy Kim, Parc Jae-jung, Jang Jane, Giant Pink	Lee Hyori	"HTT": Happy Together Superstar K Special; "LBM": Six Heroines (Korean: 여걸식스; RR: yeogeolsikseu; 2005)
507	July 13, 2017	Yoon Jong-shin, Jo Jung-chi, Eddy Kim, Parc Jae-jung, Jang Jane, Giant Pink	Lee Hyori	"HTT": Happy Together Superstar K Special; "LBM": Six Heroines (Korean: 여걸식스; RR: yeogeolsikseu; 2005)
508	July 20, 2017	Ahn Jae-wook, Kim Won-jun, Jo Mi-ryung	Lee Ro-woon, Choi Yoo-ri, Kim Ah-yoon, Goo Geon-min, Lee Da-min	"HTT": Three Friends Special; "LBM": Connect 60 Years Special (Original: Connect 30 Years (Korean: 30년을 이어라; RR: 30nyeoneul ieora); 2000)
509	July 27, 2017	Cho Yeo-jeong, Park Ha-na, Han Jin, Lee Soo-ji	Kim Tae-woo (g.o.d), F.T. Island (Lee Hong-gi, Choi Jong-hoon), Kang Min-kyung (Davichi)	"HTT": "I Can Only See You" Special; "LBM": Sing My Song Special 1
510	August 3, 2017	Sunwoo Jae-duk, Kim Ki-doo, Go Kyung-pyo, Chae Soo-bin	WANNA·ONE (Yoon Ji-sung, Hwang Min-hyun, Ong Seong-wu, Kang Daniel, Park Ji-hoon)	"HTT": Strongest Deliveryman Special; "LBM": WANNA·ONE Special
511	August 10, 2017	Girls' Generation	WANNA·ONE (Yoon Ji-sung, Hwang Min-hyun, Ong Seong-wu, Kang Daniel, Park Ji-hoon)	"HTT": Girls' Generation's 10th Anniversary Special; "LBM": WANNA·ONE Special (cont.)
512	August 17, 2017	Park Eun-ji & Park Eun-shil & Park Eun-hong, Minah (Girl's Day) & Lina (WANNA.B)	WANNA·ONE (Yoon Ji-sung, Hwang Min-hyun, Ong Seong-wu, Kang Daniel, Park Ji-hoon)	"HTT": The Elegant Sisters Special; "LBM": WANNA·ONE Special (cont.)
513	August 24, 2017	Park Eun-ji & Park Eun-shil & Park Eun-hong, Minah (Girl's Day) & Lina (WANNA.B)	Seu (스) (Jo Se-ho): Taemin (SHINee), Kai (EXO), Samuel; Ta (타) (Park Soo-hong): Jeong Da-hye, Lee Hee-jin, Yerin (GFriend); Gol (골) (Kim Yong-man): Lee Elijah, Sunmi, Dayoung (Cosmic Girls); Deun (든) (Park Myung-soo): Park Jun-gyu, Lizzy (After School/Orange Caramel), Mina (Gugudan); Bel (벨) (Kim Soo-yong): Kim Yeon-ja, Choi Hyun-woo, Woosung (Snuper)	"HTT": The Elegant Sisters Special (cont.); "LBM": Star Golden Bell Special (Korean: 스타골든벨; RR: seutagoldeunbel; 2004–2010); Host: Front: Yoo Jae-suk, Uhm Hyun-kyung; Back: Ji Suk-jin
514	August 31, 2017	—N/a	Seu (스) (Jo Se-ho): Taemin (SHINee), Kai (EXO), Samuel; Ta (타) (Park Soo-hong): Jeong Da-hye, Lee Hee-jin, Yerin (GFriend); Gol (골) (Kim Yong-man): Lee Elijah, Sunmi, Dayoung (Cosmic Girls); Deun (든) (Park Myung-soo): Park Jun-gyu, Lizzy (After School/Orange Caramel), Mina (Gugudan); Bel (벨) (Kim Soo-yong): Kim Yeon-ja, Choi Hyun-woo, Woosung (Snuper)	Only the "Legendary Big Mouth" segment was broadcast on this episode: Part 1: Star Golden Bell Special (cont.); Part 2: Sing My Song Special 2
514	August 31, 2017	—N/a	Kim Kyung-ho, So Chan-whee, Soyou, Weki Meki (Choi Yoo-jung, Kim Do-yeon)	Only the "Legendary Big Mouth" segment was broadcast on this episode: Part 1: Star Golden Bell Special (cont.); Part 2: Sing My Song Special 2
515	September 7, 2017	Oh Man-seok, Han Chae-young, Yoo Yeon-seok, Jin Ji-hee	Kim Kyung-ho, So Chan-whee, Soyou, Weki Meki (Choi Yoo-jung, Kim Do-yeon)	"HTT": Hyeja Casting Special; "LBM": Sing My Song Special 2 (cont.)
516	September 14, 2017	Lee Moo-song & Noh Sa-yeon, Choi Dong-seok & Park Ji-yoon	Fly to the Sky, g.o.d (Joon Park, Son Hoyoung), Shinhwa (Lee Min-woo, Andy), Red Velvet (Joy, Yeri)	"HTT": Boss Wives Special; "LBM": Sing My Song Special 3
517	October 5, 2017	Lee Seung-chul, TVXQ	Fly to the Sky, g.o.d (Joon Park, Son Hoyoung), Shinhwa (Lee Min-woo, Andy), Red Velvet (Joy, Yeri)	"HTT": Return of the Legend Special; "LBM": Sing My Song Special 3 (cont.)
518	October 12, 2017	Kim Saeng-min, Jung Sang-hoon, Lee Tae-im	Baek Ji-young, Lyn, Lee Seok-hoon (SG Wannabe), NU'EST (JR, Baekho)	"HTT": The Great Friendship Special; "LBM": Sing My Song Special 4
519	October 19, 2017	Kim Seung-soo, Kim Jaewon, Jung Dong-ha, Lee Gi-kwang (HIGHLIGHT)	Baek Ji-young, Lyn, Lee Seok-hoon (SG Wannabe), NU'EST (JR, Baekho)	"HTT": Women's Heart's Lupin Special; "LBM": Sing My Song Special 4 (cont.)

=== 2018 ===
List of episodes in 2018 (episodes 520 – 557)

Episode #	Air Date	Guests		Notes
Episode #	Air Date	Happy Together Town	Legendary Big Mouth (Sing My Song)	Notes
520	January 4, 2018	—N/a	Gummy, Ailee, Rhythm Power, Bolbbalgan4	
521	January 11, 2018	Han Eun-jung, Chae Yeon, Kim Ji-min, Chaeyeon (DIA)	Wheesung, Hong Jin-young, Sunmi, Wanna One (Hwang Min-hyun, Kim Jae-hwan, Kang Daniel, Bae Jin-young)	"HTT": LAN Girlfriend Special; "LBM": The Strongest by Genre
522	January 18, 2018	Bae Hae-seon, Lee Soo-kyung, Han Bo-reum, Kim Se-jeong (Gugudan)	Wheesung, Hong Jin-young, Sunmi, Wanna One (Hwang Min-hyun, Kim Jae-hwan, Kang Daniel, Bae Jin-young)	"HTT": The Goddesses Special; "LBM": The Strongest by Genre (cont.)
523	January 25, 2018	Bae Hae-seon, Lee Soo-kyung, Han Bo-reum, Kim Se-jeong (Gugudan)	Kim Kyung-ho, Kim Tae-woo (g.o.d), Lyn, Lee Seok-hoon (SG Wannabe)	"HTT": The Goddesses Special (cont.); "LBM": Ending Singers Special
524	February 1, 2018	Kim Seung-woo, Go Soo-hee, Jung So-young, Lee Tae-sung	Kim Kyung-ho, Kim Tae-woo (g.o.d), Lyn, Lee Seok-hoon (SG Wannabe)	"HTT": Actors With Presences; "LBM": Ending Singers Special (cont.)
525	February 8, 2018	Heo Kyung-hwan, Jo Se-ho, Park Ji-sun, Park Na-rae	—N/a	"HTT": 2018 Variety Star Pick Special
526	February 15, 2018	(no guest)		New Year Special: "Happy Together Friends"
527	February 22, 2018	Park Chul-min, Jang Hyun-sung, Heo Sung-tae, Kang Se-jung	Park Wan-kyu, Gilgu Bonggu, HIGHLIGHT (Lee Gi-kwang, Yang Yo-seob), EXID (Hani, Jeonghwa)	"HTT": Amazing Actors Special; "LBM": Beauty and the Beast
528	March 1, 2018	Seo Woo, Lee Chae-young, Goo Hara, Lee Da-in	Park Wan-kyu, Gilgu Bonggu, HIGHLIGHT (Lee Gi-kwang, Yang Yo-seob), EXID (Hani, Jeonghwa)	"HTT": Tough Girl Special; "LBM": Beauty and the Beast (cont.)
529	March 8, 2018	Im Baek-cheon, Choi Soo-jong, Lee Hyun-woo, Kim Ye-won	Choi Jung-won (UN), K.Will, Jo Hyun-ah (Urban Zakapa), Kim Min-seok (MeloMance), Momoland (Yeonwoo, JooE, Nancy)	"HTT": The Radio Romance Special; "LBM": Sweet Voice Avengers
530	March 15, 2018	Park Sun-young, Lee Sang-woo, Han Ji-hye, Geum Sae-rok, Yeo Hoe-hyun	Choi Jung-won (UN), K.Will, Jo Hyun-ah (Urban Zakapa), Kim Min-seok (MeloMance), Momoland (Yeonwoo, JooE, Nancy)	"HTT": Marry Me Now? Special; "LBM": Sweet Voice Avengers (cont.)
531	March 22, 2018	Chae Ri-na (Roo'ra), Sung Dae-hyun (R.ef), Han Hyun-nam (Young Turks Club), Kan Mi-youn (Baby V.O.X), Go Jae-geun (Y2K)	So Chan-whee, Davichi, HIGHLIGHT (Lee Gi-kwang, Yang Yo-seob), Wanna One (Hwang Min-hyun, Kim Jae-hwan, Kang Daniel, Bae Jin-young)	"HTT": Thursday Night Music Show; "LBM": Winner Singer Special Part 1
532	March 29, 2018	Kim Tae-won (Boohwal), Kim Jong-seo, Kim Kyung-ho, Park Wan-kyu	So Chan-whee, Davichi, HIGHLIGHT (Lee Gi-kwang, Yang Yo-seob), Wanna One (Hwang Min-hyun, Kim Jae-hwan, Kang Daniel, Bae Jin-young)	"HTT": Swinging Long Hair Special; "LBM": Winner Singer Special Part 1 (cont.)
533	April 5, 2018	Abigail Alderete, Sam Okyere, Sazal Kim, Vernon (SEVENTEEN), Han Hyun-min	—N/a	"HTT": "Welcome, First Time on Happy Together?"
534	April 12, 2018	Park Soo-hong, Yoon Jung-soo, Lee Yoon-seok, Seo Kyung-seok	Kim Yeon-ja, Tiger JK, Yoon Mi-rae, Han Dong-geun	"HTT": Variety Show Clinic, Friendship and War; "LBM": Generation Free Special
535	April 19, 2018	Won Yun-jong, Kim Dong-hyun, Jun Jung-lin, Seo Young-woo, Yun Sung-bin	Kim Yeon-ja, Tiger JK, Yoon Mi-rae, Han Dong-geun	"HTT": Sled Avengers Special; "LBM": Generation Free Special (cont.)
536	April 26, 2018	Im Tae-kyung, Hong Soo-hyun, Yoon Jong-hoon, Kim Da-som	Dynamic Duo, Hwang Chi-yeul, Jung Seung-hwan, Twice (Nayeon, Jihyo, Dahyun)	"HTT": Successful Careers Special; "LBM": Korean Wave Star Special
537	May 3, 2018	Lee Sang-hwa, Yura Min, Shim Suk-hee, Choi Min-jeong	Dynamic Duo, Hwang Chi-yeul, Jung Seung-hwan, Twice (Nayeon, Jihyo, Dahyun)	"HTT": Family Month (May) Special Part 1 – Metal Tray Karaoke Returns; "LBM": Korean Wave Star Special (cont.); Both parts exchanged the airing timeslot in this episode
538	May 10, 2018	Lee Sang-hwa, Yura Min, Shim Suk-hee, Choi Min-jeong	—N/a	"HTT": Family Month (May) Special Part 1 – Metal Tray Karaoke Returns (cont.)
539	May 17, 2018	So Yoo-jin, Kang Joo-eun, Byul, Ki Eun-se	—N/a	"HTT": Family Month (May) Special Part 2 – Late Night Cafeteria Returns
540	May 24, 2018	—N/a	Song Eun-i, Kim Young-chul, Noel (Jeon Woo-sung, Kang Kyun-sung), Ahn Young-mi, Solbi	"LBM": Family Month (May) Special Part 3 – Comedians + Singers Special
541	May 31, 2018	Yoo Min-sang, Park Sung-kwang	—N/a	"HTT": Family Month (May) Special Part 4 – Happy Together Friends Return
542	June 7, 2018	Ji Jin-hee, Bae Jeong-nam, Jo Se-ho	Ha Dong-kyun (Wanted), Brown Eyed Girls (JeA, Narsha), AOA (Yuna, Seolhyun, Chanmi), GFriend (Eunha, Yuju)	"HTT": "Where on Earth?" Special; Jo Se-ho appeared as a guest and Nam Chang-hee replaced him as a special MC on this episode; Special appearance by Yoo Ho-jin PD; "LBM": Military's Favorite Special
543	June 21, 2018	Kim Soo-yong, Jo Jae-yoon, Shin So-yul, Yoo Byung-jae, Lee Yi-kyung	Ha Dong-kyun (Wanted), Brown Eyed Girls (JeA, Narsha), AOA (Yuna, Seolhyun, Chanmi), GFriend (Eunha, Yuju)	"HTT": Big Fun Five Special; "LBM": Military's Favorite Special (cont.)
544	July 5, 2018	Park Kyung-lim, Kim Ji-hye, Ahn Hyun-mo, Jessi	Park Myeong-su, Lena Park, Shinee (Onew, Minho), Mamamoo	"HTT": Blockbuster Women Special; "LBM": King of Performances Special
545	July 12, 2018	Han Hye-yeon, Heo Kyung-hwan, Hong Jin-young, Lee Guk-joo, Kang Hye-jin	Park Myeong-su, Lena Park, Shinee (Onew, Minho), Mamamoo	"HTT": Sales King Special; "LBM": King of Performances Special (cont.)
546	July 19, 2018	Lee So-ra, Hong Seok-cheon, Kim Min-kyung, Narsha (Brown Eyed Girls), Kim Ji-min	Choi Jung-in, Hyolyn, SEVENTEEN (Mingyu, Seungkwan), Vinxen, Webster B	"HTT": Sora Club Special; "LBM": Kings and Queens of Competitions
547	July 26, 2018	Kim Jin-soo, Park Joon-hyung, Ham So-won, Shim Jin-hwa	Choi Jung-in, Hyolyn, SEVENTEEN (Mingyu, Seungkwan), Vinxen, Webster B	"HTT": "Marriage is Good" Special; Special appearance by Jin Hua (Ham So-won's husband); "LBM": Kings and Queens of Competitions (cont.)
548	August 2, 2018	Kim Ga-yeon, Kim Hyung-gyu, Kim Bo-min, MC Gree, Kim Soo-min (2018 Miss Korea "Jin")	Choi Jung-in, Hyolyn, SEVENTEEN (Mingyu, Seungkwan), Vinxen, Webster B	"HTT": Secretary Kim Special; "LBM": Kings and Queens of Competitions (cont.)
549	August 9, 2018	Kang Ki-young, Seo Hyo-rim, Uhm Hyun-kyung, Lee Si-a, Lee Jeong-hyun	Koyote, Crush, Jang Deok Cheol (Jang Joong-hyuk, Kang Deok-in), Chungha	"HTT": Eye-catching Scene-stealer Special; "LBM": Summer Hunters Special
550	August 16, 2018	Lee Kye-in, Yeom Kyung-hwan, Ji Sang-ryeol, Han Sang-jin, Yuqi ((G)I-DLE)	Koyote, Crush, Jang Deok Cheol (Jang Joong-hyuk, Kang Deok-in), Chungha	"HTT": Gasp-Inducing Stars Special; "LBM": Summer Hunters Special (cont.)
551	August 23, 2018	RPR (Skull, Haha), Kang Yoo-mi, Park Sung-kwang, YooA (Oh My Girl)	Park Mi-sun, Lee Hwi-jae	"HTT": "Friend or Foe" Special; "LBM": Summer Special MT – "The Masters of Talk Gather" (no "Sing My Song" in this episode)
552	August 30, 2018	Jung Sung-ho, Hwang Je-sung, Choi Daniel, Park Eun-bin	Park Mi-sun, Lee Hwi-jae	"HTT": "Between Horror and Humor" Special; Choi Daniel and Park Eun-bin promoted for The Ghost Detective; "LBM": Summer Special MT – "The Masters of Talk Gather" (cont.) (no "Sing My Song" in this episode)
553	September 6, 2018	Kim Tae-jin, Ddotty, Risabae, Lee Soo-min	Jaurim, Apink (Park Cho-rong, Yoon Bo-mi), Lovelyz (Jiae, Mijoo), Haon	"HTT": Shining Stars Special; "LBM": Immortal Hits Special
554	September 13, 2018	Lee Jang-woo, Uee, Yoon Jin-yi, Na Hye-mi	Jaurim, Apink (Park Cho-rong, Yoon Bo-mi), Lovelyz (Jiae, Mijoo), Haon	"HTT": My Only One Special; "LBM": Immortal Hits Special (cont.); Last episode of the segment "Legendary Big Mouth". This segment's cast members (except Yoo Jae-suk) left the show.
Episode #	Air Date	Guests		Notes
555	September 20, 2018	Im Chang-jung, Seo Yoo-jeong, Park Eun-hye, Bona (Cosmic Girls), Lucas (NCT)		Stars with Superior Genes Special
556	September 27, 2018	Kim Jin, Jo Sung-mo, Kim Seung-hyun, Woohyun (Infinite), Kang Tae-oh (5urprise), Song Kang		"My ID Is Handsome"
557	October 4, 2018	Kim Jin, Jo Sung-mo, Kim Seung-hyun, Woohyun (Infinite), Kang Tae-oh (5urprise), Song Kang		My ID Is Handsome (cont.); End of season 3; Last episode of Park Myeong-su and Uhm Hyun-kyung as the main hosts

== Happy Together Season 4 (2018 – 2020) ==
=== 2018 ===
List of episodes in 2018 (episodes 1 – 12)

Episode #		Air Date	Guests	Notes
Continuing with S3	S4	Air Date	Guests	Notes
Season 4 First Broadcast / Reorganization
558	1	October 11, 2018	Han Ji-min	'Han Ji-min' Special; Special MCs: Ji Sang-ryeol, Hwang Min-hyun (Wanna One)
559	2	October 18, 2018	Ji Suk-jin, Lee Hye-young, Jung Seon-hee, Hyun Young, Kang Soo-jeong	Heroine 6 Reunion Special; Special MC: JR (NU'EST W)
560	3	October 25, 2018	Yoo Hae-jin, Lee Seo-jin, Cho Jin-woong	Special MC: Sejeong (Gugudan)
561	4	November 1, 2018	Choi Hyun-seok, Mihal Ashminov, Austin Kang, Ki Eun-se, Son Na-eun (Apink)	"Cooking's Men – The Lost Taste's Seeking" Special; Special MC: Woohyun (Infinite)
562	5	November 8, 2018	Lee Soo-geun, BoA, Key (Shinee), EXO (Baekhyun, Sehun), NCT (Taeyong, Jaehyun)	'SM' Special
563	6	November 15, 2018	Wanna One	'Wanna One' Special
564	7	November 22, 2018	Chae Yeon, Choi Jung-won, Kwon Hyuk-soo, Ham Yeon-ji, Park Si-eun	Special MC: Yook Sung-jae (BtoB)
565	8	November 29, 2018	Boom, Kang Han-na, Seol In-ah, Shin Ye-eun	Special MC: Hwasa (Mamamoo)
566	9	December 6, 2018	Yoo Jun-sang, Kim Beop-rae, Min Young-gi, Um Ki-joon	Special MC: Kim So-hyun
567	10	December 13, 2018	Choi Won-young, Lee Dong-gun, Oh Eui-sik	Jo Yoon-hee joined as co-host; Special MC: Cha Eun-woo (Astro)
568	11	December 20, 2018	Oh Ji-ho, Lee Si-young, Jeon Hye-bin, Lee Chang-yeop, Kim Ji-young	
569	12	December 27, 2018	H.O.T. (Moon Hee-joon, Tony An), Hwangbo, Paul Kim, Sam Kim, Naeun (April)	

=== 2019 ===
List of episodes in 2019 (episodes 13 – 63)

Episode #		Air Date	Guests	Notes
Continuing with S3	S4	Air Date	Guests	Notes
570	13	January 3, 2019	Song Eun-i, Shin Bong-sun, Ahn Young-mi, Kim Shin-young	'Celeb Five' Special
571	14	January 10, 2019	Song Eun-i, Shin Bong-sun, Ahn Young-mi, Kim Shin-young	'Celeb Five' Special
572	15	January 17, 2019	Yoo Ho-jeong, Park Sung-woong, Ha Yeon-soo, Lee Won-keun	Rosebud Special
573	16	January 24, 2019	Kim Kwang-kyu, Don Spike, JeA (Brown Eyed Girls), Cheetah, Mingyu (Seventeen), Chungha	"Kim's Men" Special
574	17	January 31, 2019	Kim Bo-ra, Kim Hye-yoon, Jo Byung-gyu, Kim Dong-hee, Chani (SF9), Lee Ji-won	"The Children of Castle" Special
575	18	February 7, 2019	Kim Bo-ra, Kim Hye-yoon, Jo Byung-gyu, Kim Dong-hee, Chani (SF9), Lee Ji-won	"The Children of Castle" Special
576	19	February 14, 2019	Nam Chang-hee, Lee Yong-jin, Yang Se-chan, Kwanghee (ZE:A), CNU (B1A4), Mijoo (Lovelyz)	2019 Variety Star Pick Special
577	20	February 21, 2019	Nam Chang-hee, Lee Yong-jin, Yang Se-chan, Kwanghee (ZE:A), CNU (B1A4), Mijoo (Lovelyz)	2019 Variety Star Pick Special
578	21	February 28, 2019	Jo Bin (Norazo), Kim Ho-young, Hong Jin-young, Jeon So-min, Park Yoo-na	
579	22	March 7, 2019	Jung Jae-soon, Im Ye-jin, Cha Hwa-yeon, Lee Hye-sook, Park Sung-hoon, Uee, Na Hye-mi	My Only One Special
580	23	March 14, 2019	Kim Byung-chul, Choi Won-young, Namkoong Min, Kwon Nara, Lee Da-in	Doctor Prisoner Special; Special MC: Lai Kuan-lin
581	24	March 21, 2019	Park Hee-soon, Jin Kyung, Hwang Woo-seul-hye, Yoon Bo-ra	Doppelganger Family Special; Special MC: P.O (Block B)
582	25	March 28, 2019	Robert Holley, Sam Hammington, Guzal Tursunova, Josh Carrott, Angelina Danilova, Johathan Thona	
583	26	April 4, 2019	Robert Holley, Sam Hammington, Guzal Tursunova, Josh Carrott, Angelina Danilova, Johathan Thona	
584	27	April 11, 2019	Lee Soon-jae, Shin Goo, Kim Sung-eun, Chae Soo-bin	Special MCs: Jang Won-young and Kim Min-ju (Iz One)
585	28	April 18, 2019	Kim Hae-sook, Yoo Sun, Kim So-yeon, Kim Ha-kyung	Mother of Mine Special; Special MC: Rowoon (SF9)
586	29	April 25, 2019	Paeng Hyun-sook, Kim Ji-woo, Hong Hyun-hee, Lee Soo-ji, Yulhee	
587	30	May 2, 2019	Kim Hyung-mook, Go Joon, Seo Yu-ri, Jung Eun-woo, Park Jin-joo	Actor Avengers Special; Special MC: Minhyun (NU'EST)
588	31	May 9, 2019	Noh Joo-hyun, Jung Young-sook, Min Woo-hyuk, Kangnam, Yoon Tae-jin, Jin Ah-reum	
589	32	May 16, 2019	Oh Young-shil, Han Suk-joon, Choi Song-hyun, Oh Jeong-yeon, Jung Da-eun, Lee Hye-sung	Announcers Special
590	33	May 23, 2019	Jung Young-joo, Kim Jung-hwa, Lee Joo-bin, Heo Song-yeon, Hyejeong (AOA)	"The Return of Ssen Unnies" Special
591	34	May 30, 2019	Choi Min-soo & June Elizabeth Kang, Ahn Chang-hwan & Jang Hee-jeong	"Go-Back Couples" Special
592	35	June 6, 2019	Lee Seung-yoon, Jung Jong-cheol, Kim Won-hyo, Kim Jun-hyun, Oh Na-mi, Kim Seung-hye	"Gag Con-Together" Special
593	36	June 13, 2019	Kim Soo-yong, Yoon Jung-soo, Oh Sang-jin, Kyuhyun (Super Junior), DinDin, Seunghee (Oh My Girl)	
594	37	June 20, 2019	Jang Yoon-ju, Lee Hyun-yi, Song Hae-na, Irene Kim, Kim Jin-kyung, Jung Hyuk	Model-tainers Special
595	38	June 27, 2019	Noh Sa-yeon, Park Ji-yoon, Yoo Min-sang, Choiza (Dynamic Duo), Hong Yoon-hwa	
596	39	July 4, 2019	Im Ha-ryong, Kim Kyung-sik, Kim Tae-gyun, Moon Hee-joon (H.O.T.), Kang Ah-rang	
597	40	July 11, 2019	Ji Sang-ryeol, Seo Min-jung, Koyote (Kim Jong-min, Shin Ji), Crush, Bewhy	
598	41	July 18, 2019	Kim Young-ok, Na Moon-hee, Park Won-sook, Go Doo-shim	Dear My Friends Special
599	42	July 25, 2019	Park Yeon-soo & Song Ji-ah (daughter), Kang Ye-bin, Jung Joo-ri, Lee Guk-joo	
600	43	August 1, 2019	Seol Woon-do, Kim Yeon-ja, Jang Min-ho, Song Ga-in	Trot-together Special
601	44	August 8, 2019	Jung Jae-hyung, Yoon Min-soo (Vibe), Kim Feel, Ben, Soyou, Jung Seung-hwan	"Christmas in August" Special
602	45	August 15, 2019	Kim Gook-hee, Jung Hae-in, Jung Yoo-jin, Kim Go-eun	"Happy Together Music Album" Special
603	46	August 22, 2019	Ahn Il-kwon, Julien Kang, Choi Yeo-jin, Jang Jin-hee, Jung Chan-sung, Yang Chi-seung	
604	47	August 29, 2019	Nam Hee-suk, Nam Chang-hee, Lee Jin-ho, Lee Sang-hoon, Lee Soo-ji	
605	48	September 12, 2019	Kim Eung-soo, Lee Chang-hoon, Kim Sang-ho, Park Hae-soo	"Luxury Actor Gift Sets" Special
606	49	September 19, 2019	Shin Sung-woo, Im Tae-kyung, Um Ki-joon, Ken (VIXX)	Lee Dong-gun has appeared as a special MC on this episode to temporarily replace his wife Jo Yoon-hee.
607	50	September 26, 2019	Danny Jung, Moon Myung-jin, Jang Yun-jeong, Youngji, Son Jun-ho	
608	51	October 3, 2019	Park Yeong-gyu, Park Hae-mi, Oh Min-suk, Yoon Park, Seol In-ah	Beautiful Love, Wonderful Life Special
609	52	October 10, 2019	Jung Dong-hwan, Nam Kyung-eup, Bae Hae-seon, Mina (Gugudan)	Special MC: P.O (Block B)
610	53	October 17, 2019	Baek Ji-young, Shim Eun-jin, Byul, Yoo Jae-hwan	"Offline Top Goal Music Festival" Special; Last episode of Jo Yoon-hee as host
611	54	October 24, 2019	Jin Sung, Heo Kyung-hwan, Lee Hae-ri (Davichi), Hong Jin-young, Park Seo-jin	Great Show Special; Special MC: Sejeong (Gugudan)
612	55	October 31, 2019	Lee Kyung-kyu, Kang Hyung-wook, Lee Yu-bi	Special MC: Boom
613	56	November 7, 2019	Jo Woo-jong, Kim Il-joong, Seo Hyun-jin, Lee Ji-ae, Shin Ye-ji	Special MC: Jang Do-yeon
614	57	November 14, 2019	Jung Sung-ho, Heo Jung-min, Song Jin-woo, Lee Elijah, Solar (Mamamoo)	Special MC: Hong Jin-kyung
615	58	November 21, 2019	Kwon In-ha, Yoon Do-hyun (YB), JK Kim Dong-wook, Lee Seok-hoon (SG Wannabe), Song Ha-ye	"Love Letter Found by Chance" Special; Special MC: Kwanghee (ZE:A)
616	59	November 28, 2019	Kim Young-ok, Seo Byung-sook, Park Jun-gyu, Park Ho-san, Kim Sung-cheol, Kim Kang-hoon	Special MC: Kang Daniel
617	60	December 5, 2019	Kim Young-chul, Park Young-jin, Kim Won-hyo, Park Sung-kwang, Kim Ji-ho	"I Am a Comedian-Singer" Special; Special MC: Heo Kyung-hwan
618	61	December 12, 2019	Lee Soon-jae, Jung Young-sook, Lee Seok-joon, Jung Il-woo	"High Kick! in Happy Together" Special; Special MC: Oh Hyun-kyung
619	62	December 19, 2019	Moon Myung-jin, Hong Hyun-hee, Suran, Irene Kim, Jonathan	Happy Together Legends Special; Special MC: Kim Kang-hoon
620	63	December 26, 2019	Sook Haeng, Hong Ja, Song Ga-in, Jung Mi-ae, Jung Da-kyung	Merry Christmas Special

=== 2020 ===
List of episodes in 2020 (episodes 64 – 77)

Episode #		Air Date	Guests	Notes
Continuing with S3	S4	Air Date	Guests	Notes
621	64	January 2, 2020	Kim Hyung-joon, Heo Ji-woong, Hwang Chi-yeul, Oh Jeong-yeon, Baek Chung-kang	"Life is a Beautiful Crisis" Special
622	65	January 9, 2020	Bae Jong-ok, Sean (Jinusean), Kim Gyu-ri, Joy (Red Velvet), Rowoon (SF9)	Mansour Passion Special; Special MC: So Yoo-jin
623	66	January 16, 2020	Jang Hyun-sung, Choi Hyun-seok, Kim Seung-hyun, Ha Seung-jin	"I'm Your Father" Special; Special MC: So Yi-hyun
624	67	January 23, 2020	Jeong Jun-ha, Yoon Sung-ho, Moon Cheon-sik, Kim Jong-min (Koyote), Park So-young	No Brain Special
625	68	January 30, 2020	Sechs Kies (Eun Ji-won, Lee Jai-jin, Kim Jae-duck, Jang Su-won)	Sechs Kies Special; Special MC: Chun Myung-hoon (NRG)
626	69	February 6, 2020	Park Mi-sun, Lee Ji-hye, Shim Jin-hwa	Sisters' Dinner Special
627	70	February 13, 2020	Jeong Jun-ha, Hong Hyun-hee	
628	71	February 20, 2020	Jeong Jun-ha, Hong Hyun-hee	
629	72	February 27, 2020	Hong Jin-kyung, Heo Jung-min, Angelina Danilova	
630	73	March 5, 2020	Hong Jin-kyung, Heo Jung-min, Angelina Danilova	
631	74	March 12, 2020	Noh Sa-yeon, Yang Joon-il, Ahyumi, Younggi	Time Travelers Special
632	75	March 19, 2020	Seo Yi-sook, Heo Sung-tae, Ha Do-kwon, Cha Cheong-hwa, Shin Ye-eun	"My Acting Class" Special
633	76	March 26, 2020	Hong Ji-min, Ahn Seon-young, Ham So-won, Kim Bin-woo	Dieter Special; Special MCs: Oh My Girl (Hyojung, Mimi)
634	77	April 2, 2020	Jo Woo-jong, Heo Kyung-hwan, Nam Chang-hee, Uhm Hyun-kyung	"Good Job, My Friends!" Special; End of season 4
