= List of Burundian musicians =

The following is a list of Burundian musicians. This list is organized alphabetically and includes members of the Burundian diaspora.

== B ==
- Belle 9ice
- J.P. Bimeni

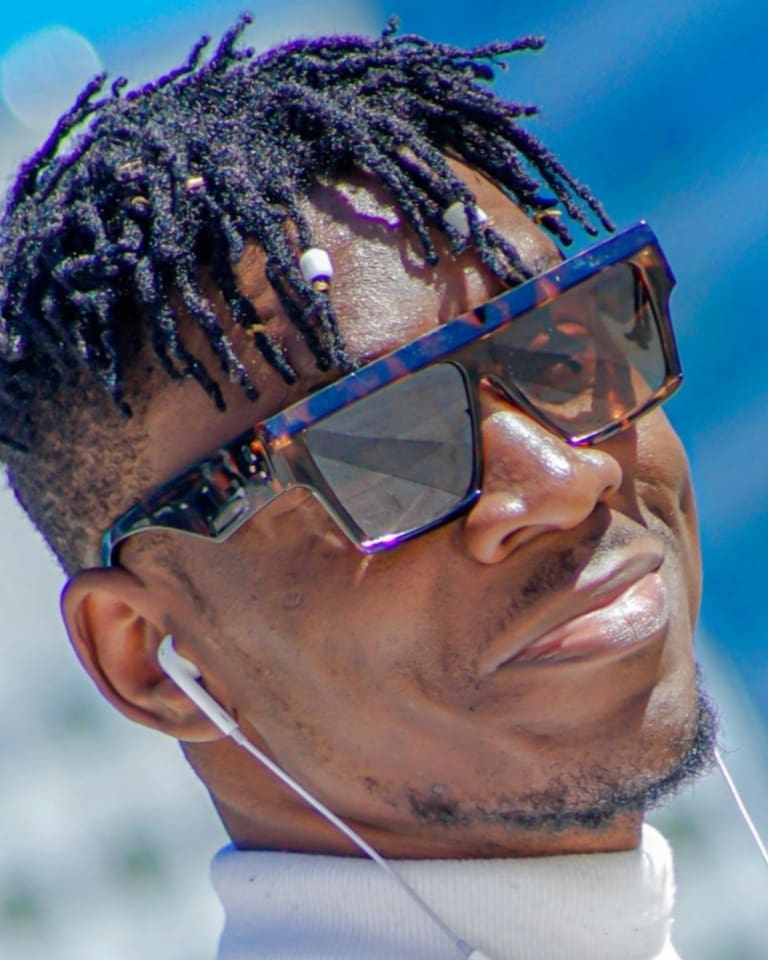
Kebby Boy, 2020

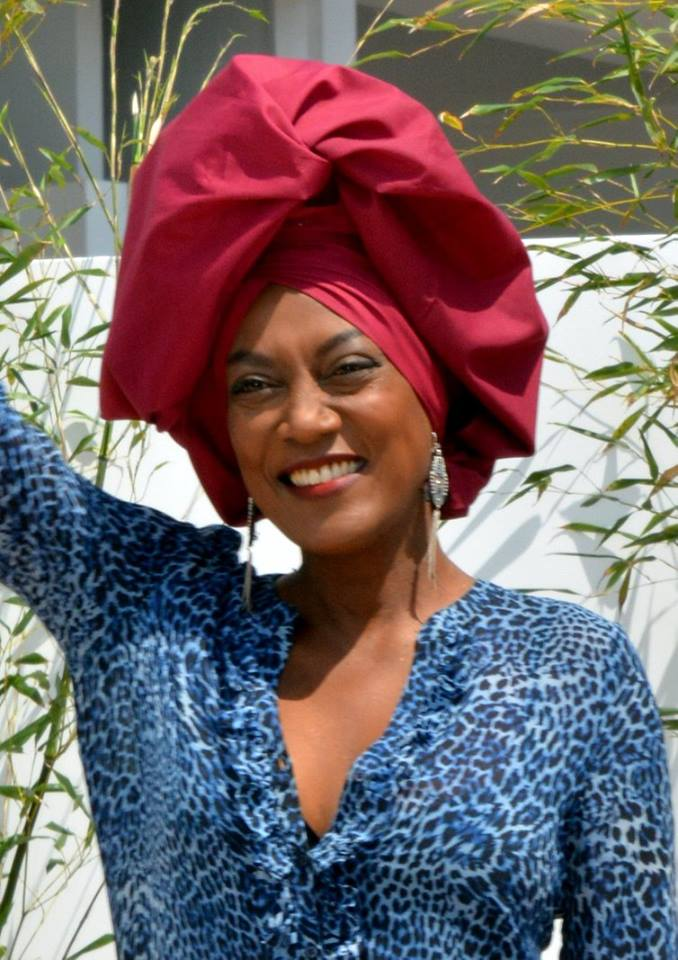
Khadja Nin, 2018

== D ==
- DJ Ira born September 7, 1997 (age 29)

== H ==
- Happy Famba

== K ==
- Kebby Boy born June 30, 1990 (age 36)
- Kidum born October 28, 1974 (age 51)
- Khadja Nin born June 27, 1959 (age 67)

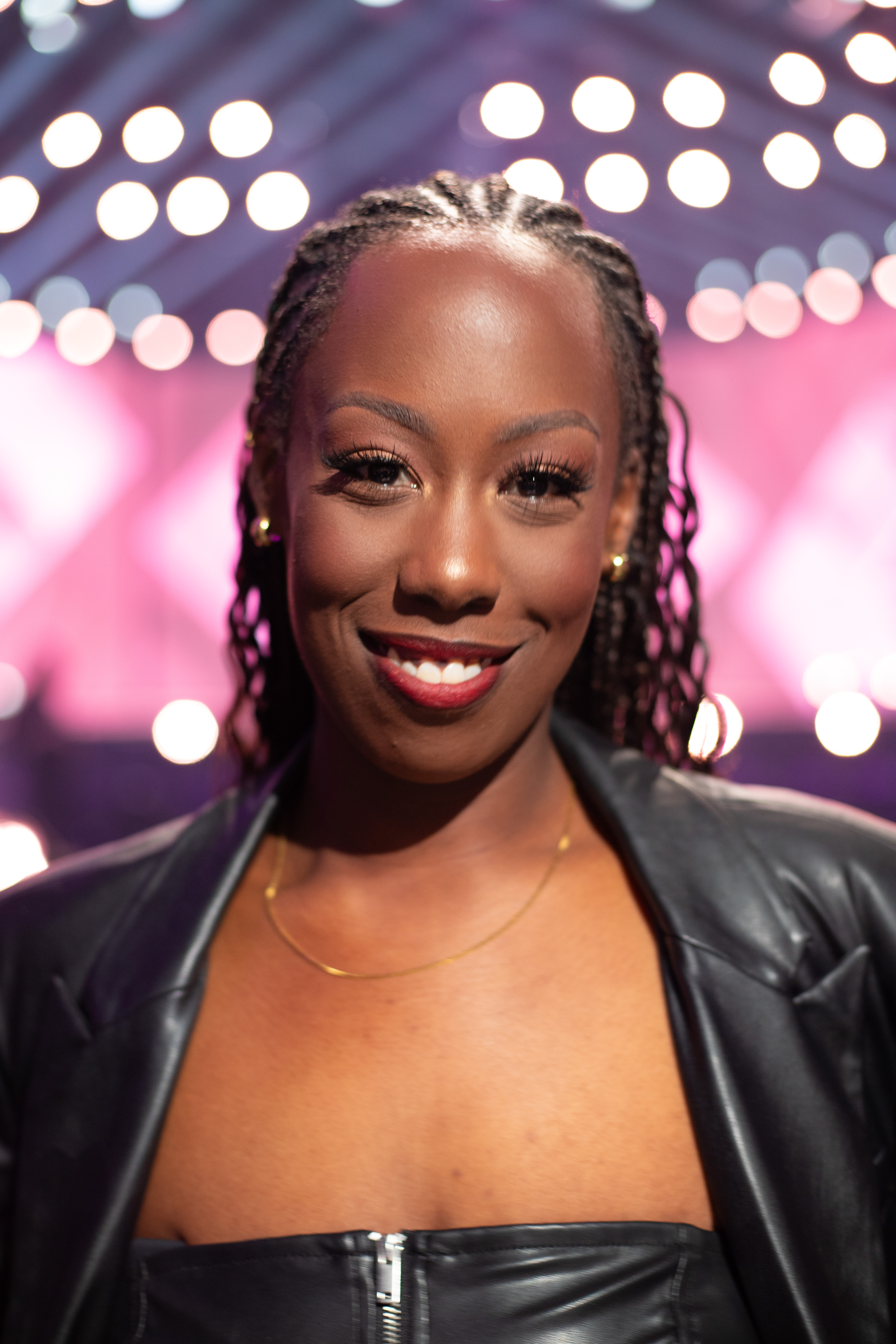
Chelsea Muco, 2024

== M ==
- Miss Erica
- Masterland
- Chelsea Muco

== S ==
- Sat-B
- Spoks Man born April 15, 1992 (age 34)

== T ==
- T-Max

== See also ==
- List of Burundian actors
