= List of awards and nominations received by Kim Hyun-joong =

Kim Hyun-joong awards and nominations
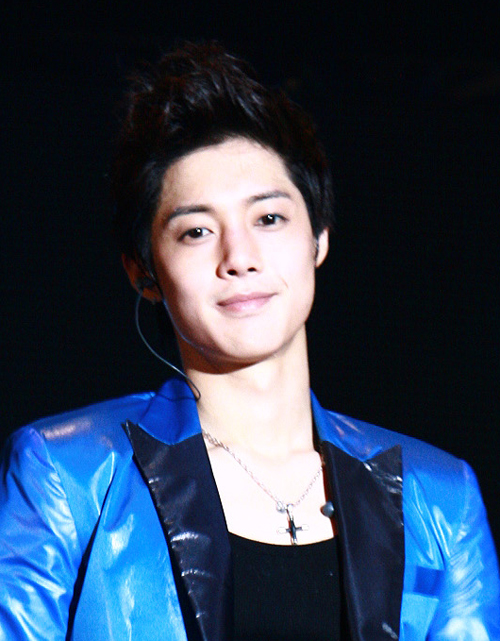
- Kim at SS501's concert in Hong Kong, 2009
Awards and nominations
Award	Wins	Nominations

Totals (Note: Certain award groups do not simply award one winner. They acknowledge several different recipients, have runners-up, and have third place. Since this is a specific recognition and is different from losing an award, runner-up mentions are considered wins in this award tally. For simplification and to avoid errors, each award in this list has been presumed to have had a prior nomination.)
- Wins: 35
- Nominations: 42

This is an incomplete list that shows the awards and nominations received by South Korean artist Kim Hyun-joong.

== Awards and nominations ==
Name of award ceremony, year presented, award category, nominee of award, and result of nomination
Award ceremony	Year	Category	Nominee/work	Result	Ref.
Asia Song Festival	2012	Best Asian Artist Award	Kim Hyun-joong	Won	
Asia Song Festival	2012	Best Artist Award – South Korea	Kim Hyun-joong	Won	
Baeksang Arts Awards	2009	Most Popular Actor (TV)	Boys Over Flowers	Won	
Baeksang Arts Awards	2014	Most Popular Actor (TV)	Inspiring Generation	Nominated	
Golden Disc Awards	2013	Album Bonsang	Round 3	Nominated	
California International Independent Film Festival (Spring Session)	2020	Best Actor (Diamond Award)	Indian Pink	Won	
KBS Drama Awards	2014	Outstanding Male Actor	Inspiring Generation	Nominated	
Korean Entertainment Awards in Japan	2013	Male Solo Singer	Kim Hyun-joong	Won	
Korea Junior Star Awards	2009	TV Drama Newcomer Award	Boys Over Flowers	Won	
MBC Drama Awards	2010	Male Popularity Award	Playful Kiss	Won	
MBC Entertainment Awards	2008	Best Couple Award (with Hwang Bo)	We Got Married	Won	
MBC Entertainment Awards	2008	Best Brand of the Year Special Award (with cast)	We Got Married	Won	
Miguhui Awards	2012	Most Popular Overseas Singer	Kim Hyun-joong	Won	
Mnet 20's Choice Awards	2010	Most Influential Star	Kim Hyun-joong	Won	
Mnet Asian Music Awards	2011	Best Male Solo Artist	"Break Down"	Won	
Okinawa Movie Festival	2013	Creator's Factory Best Actor Award	"Lucky Guy" music video	Won	
Philippine K-pop Awards	2009	Hottest Male Artist	Kim Hyun-joong	Won	
Seoul International Drama Awards	2009	Popular Actor	Boys Over Flowers	Won	
Sky Perfect TV Awards	2010	Best Dresser Award	Kim Hyun-joong	Won	
Style Icon Awards	2010	Popularity Award	Kim Hyun-joong	Won	
Style Icon Awards	2011	People's Choice Award	Kim Hyun-joong	Won	
Tower Records K-pop Lovers Awards	2012	Single Grand Prize	"Heat"	Won	
Tower Records K-pop Lovers Awards	2013	Best Single	"Tonight"	Nominated	
World Music Awards	2014	World's Best Male Artist	Kim Hyun-joong	Nominated	
World Music Awards	2014	World's Best Live Act	Kim Hyun-joong	Nominated	
World Music Awards	2014	World's Best Entertainer of the Year	Kim Hyun-joong	Nominated	
Yahoo! Asia Buzz Awards	2009	Korea's Top Buzz Male Artist	Kim Hyun-joong	Won	
Yahoo! Asia Buzz Awards	2009	Taiwan's Top Buzz Korean Artist	Kim Hyun-joong	Won	
Yahoo! Asia Buzz Awards	2009	Asia's Top Buzz Male Artist	Kim Hyun-joong	Won	
Yahoo! Asia Buzz Awards	2010	Hong Kong's Top Buzz Korean Artist	Kim Hyun-joong	Won	
Yahoo! Asia Buzz Awards	2010	Taiwan's Top Buzz Korean Artist	Kim Hyun-joong	Won	
Yahoo! Asia Buzz Awards	2010	The Best Search Asia Buzz Award	Kim Hyun-joong	Won	
Yahoo! Asia Buzz Awards	2011	Hong Kong's Top Buzz Solo Artist	Kim Hyun-joong	Won	
Yahoo! Asia Buzz Awards	2011	Taiwan's Top Buzz Solo Artist	Kim Hyun-joong	Won	
Yahoo! Asia Buzz Awards	2011	Korea's Top Buzz Solo Artist	Kim Hyun-joong	Won	
Yahoo! Asia Buzz Awards	2011	Asia's Top Buzz Solo Artist	Kim Hyun-joong	Won	
Yahoo! Asia Buzz Awards	2012	Hong Kong's Top Buzz Solo Artist	Kim Hyun-joong	Won	
Yahoo! Asia Buzz Awards	2012	Taiwan's Top Buzz Solo Artist	Kim Hyun-joong	Won	
Yahoo! Asia Buzz Awards	2012	Asia's Top Buzz Solo Artist	Kim Hyun-joong	Won	
Yahoo! Asia Buzz Awards	2012	Most Popular Artist of the Decade	Kim Hyun-joong	Won	
Yahoo! Asia Buzz Awards	2013	Most Searched Korean Artist	Kim Hyun-joong	Won	
Yahoo! Asia Buzz Awards	2014	Most Searched Asian Artist	Kim Hyun-joong	Won	

== Listicles ==
Name of publisher, year listed, name of listicle, and placement
Publisher	Year	Listicle	Rank	Ref.
Forbes	2010	Korea Power Celebrity	19th	
Forbes	2012	Korea Power Celebrity	26th	
