= List of Burundian actors =

This is a list of notable actors and actresses from, or associated with, Burundi. This list is organized alphabetically by surname and includes actors of Burundian descent.

== G ==
- Célestin Gakwaya

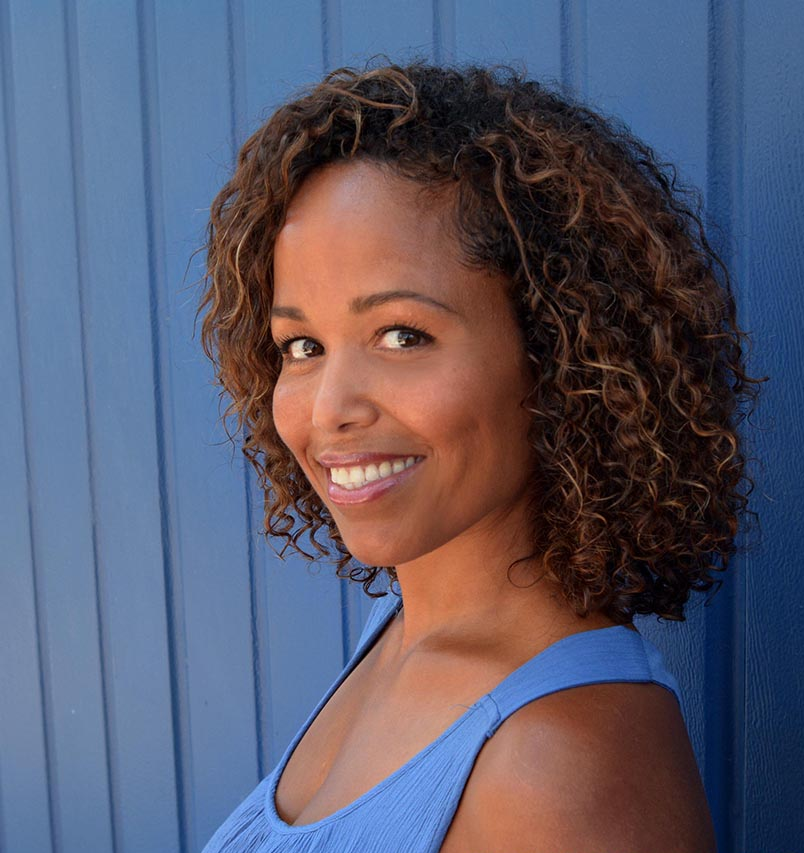
Seba Johnson, 2019

== J ==
- Seba Johnson born May 1, 1973 (age 53)

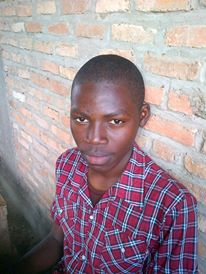
Fabrice Kwizera, 2011

== K ==
- Fabrice Kwizera

== M ==
- Vénuste Maronko born September 1992 (age 33)
- Katja Mia born May 17, 1996 (age 30)

== N ==
- Michel-Ange Nzojibwami

== O ==
- Celeste O'Connor born December 2, 1998 (age 27)

== S ==
- Consolate Sipérius born 20 March 1989 (age 37)

== See also ==
- List of Burundians people
- List of Burundian musicians
- Cinema of Burundi
- Léonce Ngabo, Burundian film director
