= Imademo =

Studio album by Kim Hyun-joong
- Released: February 11, 2015
- Genre: J-pop
- Length: 40:06
- Label: Universal Music Japan, Delicious Deli

Kim Hyun-joong chronology
Unlimited (2012)	Imademo (2015)

Singles from Imademo
- 1. "Tonight" Released: June 5, 2013; 2. "Hot Sun" Released: June 18, 2014

Imademo or Still (今でも) is Kim Hyun-joong's second Japanese full-length studio album, which was released on February 11, 2015 under Universal Music Japan and Delicious Deli. It consists of mostly Japanese versions of his Korean songs but also includes four new songs, totaling to twelve tracks.

== Background and development ==
Kim Hyun-joong has had various achievements in Japan with his previous single releases in the country. In 2012, both his "Kiss Kiss / Lucky Guy" and "Heat" singles were among the Oricon's Top 100 Singles of the year. Since then, his singles had reached Gold for selling more than 100,000 records. In June 2014, his latest single release of "Hot Sun" marked the second time that Kim reached the top spot on the weekly charts and, subsequently, the first time for a foreign male artist to rank first twice.

After releasing and promoting his fourth Japanese single "Hot Sun" in Japan, Kim Hyun-joong went back to South Korea for the mini album release of Timing in July. He promoted his album in and out of the country, continuing his 2014 Kim Hyun Joong World Tour and attending to his other activities. In December 2014, it was announced that he will be releasing his second Japanese album, as well as his scheduled concert. Tickets were released starting on the last week of January 2015.

Most of the songs in the album, twelve in particular, include Japanese versions of his former recorded songs from his mini albums Timing and Round 3 in South Korea. His Japanese singles "Tonight" and "Hot Sun", released in 2013 and 2014 respectively, were also added in the album.

== Release and promotion ==
Around two years since his last Japanese album release, Kim Hyun-joong released his second full-length Japanese studio album Imademo on February 11, 2015. The album entered the Oricon Daily Charts at 2 selling 23,047 records on the first day, and it remained in the spot for ten days. It then reached 3 at Oricon Albums Chart for the first week of its release.

He started his Japan tour named Kim Hyun Joong JAPAN TOUR 2015 - GEMINI at the Yokahoma National Convention Hall on January 27. His 12-day tour was held from January 27 to February 14 in ten major cities in Japan. The tour was extended for three more days later on, totaling to 15 performances in eleven cities. Announced on February 7, 2015 in commemoration of Imademo, Kim also held a panel exhibition at the Tower Records Shibuya from February 10 to 16 to promote his album.

Imademo was Kim Hyun-joong's last album release before his mandatory military service as a border guard between North and South Korea. He was to enlist on March 31 after receiving his draft notice, though he postponed it for personal reasons. He moved his enlistment on May 12; he had undergone his five-week basic training at the Recruit Training Center of Army Division 30 in Goyang-si.

== Track listing ==
No.	Title	Lyrics	Music	Length
1.	"Tonight"	Rina Moon	Sean Alexander, Glen Choi(dj nure), Michaelangelo(Michael Snyder), Todd Joseph Slingsby	3:06
2.	"Hot Sun"	Rina Moon	Steven Lee, Andeas Oberg, Jimmy Richard	3:22
3.	"Gentleman" (Japanese version)	Shoko Fujibayashi	Kasper Larsen, Ole Brodersen, Rasmus Thude, Marli Harwood	3:08
4.	"What I Wanted To Say" (Japanese version)	Shoko Fujibayashi	Park Won Woo, TaGoNan	3:40
5.	"Imademo"	Shoko Fujibayashi	Steven Lee, Jimmy Richard	3:58
6.	"Kimi Dake Wo Kesenakute"	Rina Moon	Neil Athale, Dee Adams	3:50
7.	"Timing (ft. Sky-Hi)" (Japanese Version)	Rina Moon	Andreas Oberg, Jimmy Richard, Alex Niceforo	3:42
8.	"Cappuccino"	Rina Moon	Steven Lee, Jimmy Richard, Fredrik Hult, Andreas Oberg	3:32
9.	"Beauty Beauty" (Japanese Version)	Shoko Fujibayashi	Andreas Oberg, Andreas Weise, Jesper Naenfeldt, Henrik Liljequist	3:15
10.	"Nothing On You (feat. Hanhae)" (Japanese Version)	Shoko Fujibayashi	Kiggen(Phantom), Won Young Heon	3:35
11.	"B.I.N.G.O"	Rina Moon	Steven Lee, Tom Hugo	3:54
12.	"Good-Bye"	Rina Moon	Steven Lee, Goldfingerz, Jimmy Richard, Blake English	3:44
Total length:				40:06

Disc 2 (Blu-ray)
No.	Title	Length
1.	"Even Now" (music video)
2.	"Tonight" (music video)
3.	"Cappuccino" (music video)
4.	"Kimi Dake Wo Kesenakute" (music video)
5.	"Hot Sun" (making of the album jacket)
6.	"Even Now" (making of the music video)

== Release history ==
Country	Date	Label	Format
Worldwide	February 11, 2015	Universal Music Japan, Delicious Deli	digital download
Japan	February 11, 2015	Universal Music Japan, Delicious Deli	digital download
Japan	February 11, 2015	Universal Music Japan, Delicious Deli	CD
Japan	February 11, 2015	Universal Music Japan, Delicious Deli	CD + Blu-ray DVD (Limited Edition - Type A)
Japan	February 11, 2015	Universal Music Japan, Delicious Deli	CD+DVD (Limited Edition - Type B)
Japan	February 11, 2015	Universal Music Japan, Delicious Deli	CD+Goods (Limited Edition - Type C)
Taiwan	February 13, 2015	Universal Music Japan, Delicious Deli	CD+DVD (Limited Edition)

== Charts ==
Chart	Country	Peak
Oricon Daily Albums Chart	Japan	2
Oricon Weekly Albums Chart	Japan	3
Oricon Monthly Albums Chart	Japan	12
