= Timing (EP) =

- Timing album cover

EP by Kim Hyun-joong
- Released: July 11, 2014
- Genre: K-pop
- Language: Korean
- Label: KeyEast

Kim Hyun-joong chronology
Round 3 (2013)	Timing (2014)

Music video
- "Beauty Beauty" on YouTube

Timing is Kim Hyun-joong's fourth Korean mini-album, which was released on July 11, 2014, under KeyEast.

The album was preceded by the pre-release single, "His Habit", released on July 4, 2014. The track "Beauty Beauty" was released one week after, together with the album on July 11.

== Background and development ==
After he released his fourth Japanese single album Hot Sun on June 18, Kim went off to his 2014 Kim Hyun Joong World Tour: Dream and Fantasy tour starting on June 28 in Seoul. While he was touring, KeyEast Entertainment revealed on July 2 that Kim will be having a new album in Korea in days. The album is said to be a reflection of Kim Hyun-joong's past as well as the direction he will be walking on towards his future. In addition, a teaser image of Kim standing before an old alleyway, representing an old-and-new image of his life. Besides the image teaser, the upcoming four tracks were also announced. In particular, various overseas artists were said to have participated in producing the tracks of the album including Pharrell Williams' guitarist Brent Paschke and Far East Movement's keyboardist Mister Rocks.

On July 4, Kim posted the CD jacket image for Timing, just before his pre-release of "His Habit" song at noon of the same day. Four days after, on July 8, a video of himself promoting his upcoming album was uploaded onto his official YouTube account. Right after his message was a video teaser for his single "Beauty Beauty". Once again, Kim released more photo teasers on July 11 before officially releasing the album at noon.

== Release and promotion ==
Two days after his agency's announcement, Kim has pre-released "His Habit" single on July 4 prior to his album release. The song features Lim Kim and Kanto and penned by Mister Rocks. Just as planned, Kim released his album one week later, around the time that he was touring worldwide. The music video for "Beauty Beauty" was uploaded on his official YouTube channel in the same day, which includes a behind-the-scenes footage at the end.

After its release, Kim continued his world tour. For instance, he attended his Japanese concert in Yokohama Arena on July 29 and 30 titled 2014 Kim Hyun Joong World Tour: Fantasy in Japan gathering over 20,000 fans. He also promoted his just completed Korean series Inspiring Generation, a premium event prior to his concert in Osaka on August 5, garnering 13,000 fans.

== Tracks ==
Kim Hyun-joong's tracks have different genres. "His Habit" is an urban hip hop song featuring Kim Hyun-joong and Lim Kim's harmony and Kanto's rapping, producing a "more sentimental album". The track, penned by Far East Movement's keyboard player Mister Rocks, was the first to be released before his album release. His title track "Beauty Beauty", on the other hand, is an up-tempo dance track with band sounds. At the same time, the music video shows a "colorful, warm and party-worthy setting".

Other tracks include "Nothing On You", an acoustic ballad, and "What I Want to Say", a modern British ballad track.

=== Track listing ===
No.	Title	Length
1.	"His Habit" (ft. Lim Kim and Kanto)	3:48
2.	"Beauty Beauty"	3:15
3.	"Nothing on You ft. Hanhae"	3:35
4.	"What I Wanted to Say" (하고 싶은 말)	3:40
5.	"Beauty Beauty inst."	3:15

DVD (Limited Edition only)
No.	Title	Length
1.	"'Beauty Beauty' MV"
2.	"'Beauty Beauty' behind the scenes"
3.	"'Beauty Beauty' MV teaser"

== Music videos ==
- "Beauty Beauty"

== Release history ==
Country	Date	Distributing label	Format
South Korea	July 11, 2014	KeyEast	CD
Worldwide	July 11, 2014	KeyEast	digital download
Taiwan	July 15, 2014	Warner Music Taiwan	Limited edition CD

== Charts ==
Chart	Country	Peak position
Gaon Weekly Album Chart	South Korea	3
Gaon Monthly Album Chart	South Korea	8
Gaon Yearly Album Chart	South Korea	61
