= Kim Joon =

South Korean rapper and actor (born 1984)

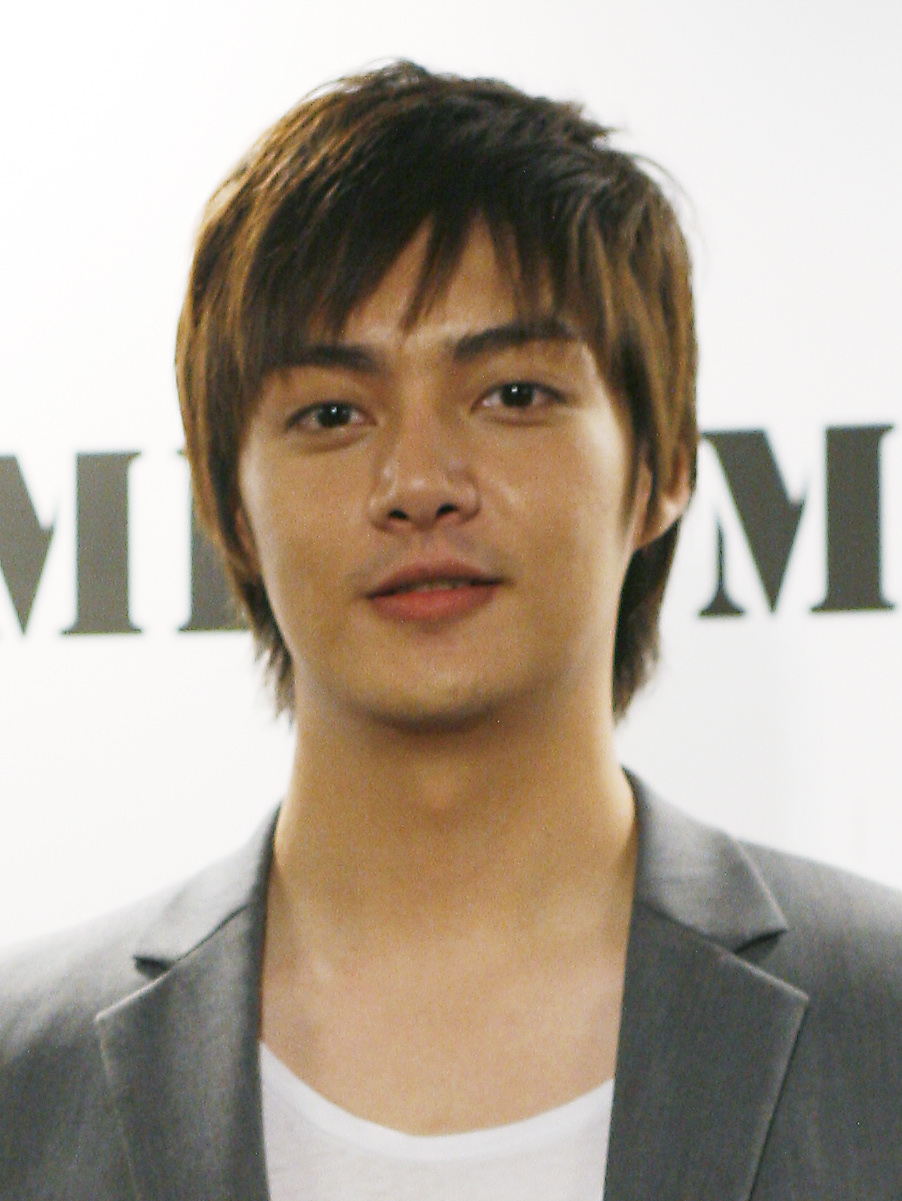
- Kim in 2009
- Born: Kim Hyung-joon; February 3, 1984 (age 42); Gwacheon, Gyeonggi, South Korea
- Occupations: Singer; actor
- Years active: 2007–present
- Spouse: Unknown (m. 2015)
- Children: 1
- Musical career
- Genres: K-pop; J-pop
- Label: CHANG Company

- Kim Joon
- Hangul: 김형준
- Hanja: 金亨俊
- RR: Gim Hyeongjun
- MR: Kim Hyŏngjun

Stage name
- Hangul: 김준
- Hanja: 金俊
- RR: Gim Jun
- MR: Kim Chun

Kim Joon (born Kim Hyung-joon on February 3, 1984 in Gwacheon, Gyeonggi, South Korea) is a South Korean rapper and actor who rose to stardom with his portrayal of one of the famous F4 members in the 2009 hit drama Boys Over Flowers.

== Career ==
Kim Joon made his entertainment debut with the boyband T-Max in 2007, as a rapper and a songwriter for the group. In 2009, Kim became popular after playing the role of F4 member "Song Woo-bin" in the hit Korean drama Boys Over Flowers. Together with his band, their song entitled "Paradise" was featured in the first edition of the Boys Over Flowers soundtrack. Other songs of T-Max that were featured in the subsequent editions of the Boys Over Flowers soundtrack were "Say Yes," "Wish You're My Love", "Fight The Bad Feeling," and "Bang Bang Boom".

As a solo artist, Kim also had a single in the soundtrack titled "To Empty Out," which featured Kim Jo-han. He also released another song he had written himself, "Jun Be O.K.," and Kim Hyun-joong made a cameo appearance in the music video of the song.

From April 2009 to December 2010, Kim was a cast member of Invincible Baseball Team, a variety-reality show that aired during Saturday Challenges; he was chosen as MVP for several weeks. In June 2009, he took part in another reality show Mnet Scandal, where a celebrity dates a non-celebrity for a week. In July 2009, he made his stage debut in the musical Youthful March (젊음의 행진), along with his T-Max co-member Park Yun-hwa. Kim tested positive for H1N1 in November 2009 and had to cancel a fan meeting event in the Philippines.

In March 2010, Kim starred in mobile drama alongside Nao Minamisawa titled Pygmalion's Love, a Korea-Japanese co-production that aired on Japanese mobile TV station BeeTV. In May 2010, T-Max returned to performing with "Don't Be Rude", the first single for their studio album Born to the Max (new members Park Han-bi and Joo Chan-yang replaced Park Yun-hwa after the latter's departure for mandatory military service). The second single was "Words That I Can Say", and Kim appeared alongside actors Oh Ji-ho and Yoon So-yi in the music video.

In March 2011, he starred in the police procedural Detectives in Trouble where he played a detective who specialized in cyber-investigations, but has trouble dealing with real-life cases because of his fear of corpses. He also began studying for a master's degree in Global Culture Content at the Hankuk University of Foreign Studies. A representative from his agency Planet05 commented, "Kim Joon has taken an interest in spreading Korean culture after he was able to meet with various international fans and after being named as an honorary ambassador of Global Tourism Etiquette. He wants to study the production of Hallyu culture content and its spread on a deeper level." On May 16, 2011, the T-Max members appeared on the game show 1 vs. 100 to raise funds for the establishment of an "invincible baseball" team; Kim advanced to the final 2, but did not win.

== Personal life ==
=== Military enlistment ===
Kim enlisted for his mandatory military service on September 29, 2011 for four weeks of basic training, followed by duty as a conscripted policeman. He was discharged on June 28, 2013.

=== Marriage ===
In June 2018, it was reported Kim has been married for three years to a non-celebrity and was a father of a child. Kim got married in 2015 to his then girlfriend whom he has been dating for nine years even before he debuted in the entertainment industry.

== Filmography ==
=== Television ===
Year	Title	Role
2009	Boys Over Flowers	Song Woo-bin
2011	Detectives in Trouble	Shin Dong-jin
2014	Endless Love	Kim Tae-gyeong
2015	City of the Sun	Kang Tae-yang

=== Film ===
Year	Title	Role	Notes
2014	Lupin III	Pierre	Japanese film
2019	Friday the 13th: The Conspiracy Begins	Phillip Kim	
2019	Man of Men	Choong-won	
2019	Evil Empire: Friday the 13th Chapter 2	Phillip Kim	
2020	Death Cab	Phillip Kim	

== Discography ==
=== Albums ===
- 2007 Tmax Blooming (Single)
- 2007 Tmax Lion Heart (Single)
- 2008 Tmax Run To You (Single)
- 2009 Tmax Motto Paradise (Single)
- 2009 Tmax Single Collection (EP)
- 2009 Tmax Love Parade (Single)
- 2010 Tmax Born to the Max (regular)

=== Soundtrack appearances ===
- 2009 Boys Over Flowers OST 1&2
  - "Paradise" (Opening Theme)
  - "Say Yes!"
  - "Wish Ur My Love"
  - "Fight the Bad Feeling"
- 2009 F4 Special Edition
  - "Bang Bang Boom"
  - "Empty Bet" (Kim Joon feat. Jo-han)
  - "Fight the Bad Feeling" (Club Version)
  - "Fight the Bad Feeling" (Ballad Version)
  - "Fight the Bad Feeling" (Dance Version)
- 2009 Anycall HAPTIC MISSION
  - "Talk in Love" (Kim Joon feat. Son Dam-bi)
  - "Mission No.4" (Son Dam-bi feat. Kim Joon & Kim Hyun-joong)
  - "Rolling Callin Darling" (Son Dam-bi feat. Kim Joon & Kim Hyun-joong)
- 2010 Master of Study OST
  - "For Once"
- 2011 Detectives in Trouble OST
  - "Believe"
  - "Joy & Pain" feat. DJ DOC
  - "At the End of the World"

== Magazine ==
- Lacoste
- G-Star
- W Magazine
- Sure Magazine
- Brokore Japan Magazine
- Teen Girl Philippines Magazine
- Ceci Magazine
- Midnight Blues in Style Magazine
- Play Magazine
- Pygmalion's Love Magazine

== Awards ==
- 2010 Presidential Award for Content Award
- 2010 Invincible Baseball Player Award
- 2010 Ambassador for Tourism Award
- 2009 Andre Kim Awards Male Star Award
- 2009 Hallyu Stars Award with T-max

== Education ==
- Shinsung High School
- Hankuk University of Foreign Studies, College of Natural Science, Biochemistry Major
- Hankuk University of Foreign Studies, Cyber Program, Japanese Major
- Hankuk University of Foreign Studies, Global Culture Contents Major (starting March 2011)
