= Hot Sun =

- "Hot Sun" Normal Edition album cover

Single by Kim Hyun-joong

from the album Imademo
- Released: June 18, 2014
- Genre: J-pop, Pop rock
- Label: Delicious Deli Records; Universal Music Japan
- Songwriter: Steven Lee
- Producer: Steven Lee

Kim Hyun-joong singles chronology
"Tonight" (2013)	"Hot Sun" (2014)

Music video
- "Hot Sun" video teaser on YouTube

Hot Sun is Kim Hyun-joong's fourth Japanese single, which was released on June 18, 2014, under Delicious Deli Records and Universal Music Japan. There are six available versions of this single which has six completely different image concepts for each of the single covers. Each version includes different limited editions that may include a DVD with the music video.

== Background and development ==
Before the official announcement, Kim Hyun-joong was busy promoting his just completed Inspiring Generation Korean series as it will be aired through the Japanese channel DATV starting in August. On May 31, Kim attended the special fanmeeting event with 10,000 fans in Pacifico Yokohama Convention Hall.

On April 28, it was reported that Kim Hyun-joong will be releasing a new single entitled "Hot Sun". The upcoming single will be Kim Hyun-joong's fourth Japanese single album since "Tonight" in June 2013. Once again, Steven Lee will be producing yet another song for him. AAA group member Mitsuhiro Hidaka is also said to be featured in the album.

On June 5, Universal Music Japan released a 30-second video teaser for "Hot Sun" music video, uploaded onto their official YouTube account. It features various album jackets for the six versions, as well as the behind-the-scenes footage of the photoshoot.

== Release and promotion ==
Just like the other singles and album released by him in Japan, "Hot Sun" peaked at number one on Oricon charts as well. The single, selling 65,000 copies on the first day of its release, marked the second time that Kim reached the top spot on the weekly charts since his "Heat" single in 2012. According to Oricon, it was also the first time for a foreign male artist to rank first twice.

The day after its release, Kim met with the fans through handshaking events in Nagoya and Osaka on June 19 and 20 respectively. One week after, Keyeast announced on June 26 that Kim will be having a world tour. His concert tour titled 2014 Kim Hyun Joong World Tour: Dream and Fantasy will include cities in Seoul, Taiwan, China, Japan, Thailand, Mexico and Peru starting on June 28.

== Singles ==
"Hot Sun" album single has different concepts. The title song "Hot Sun" is a pop-rock summer song while "Timing" is a pop-dance song. The other tracks in the single includes the punk-rock and up-tempo pop-rock tracks "B.I.N.G.O" and "Good-Bye" respectively.

== Track listing ==
No.	Title	Music	Length
1.	"Hot Sun"	Steven Lee	3:23
2.	"Timing" (ft. Mitsuhiro Hidaka)		3:43
3.	"Hot Sun inst."		3:22
4.	"Timing inst."		3:44

Type A and B: Bonus
No.	Title	Length
1.	"DVD"

Type C: Bonus (B-side track)
No.	Title	Music	Length
1.	"Goodbye"	Steven Lee	3:42
2.	"Goodbye inst."	Steven Lee	3:45

Type D: Bonus (B-side track)
No.	Title	Music	Length
1.	"B.I.N.G.O."	Steven Lee	3:54
2.	"B.I.N.G.O. inst."		3:56

Type E: Bonus
No.	Title	Length
1.	"random postcard"

== Music videos ==
- "Hot Sun"

== Release history ==
Country	Date	Distributing label	Format
Japan	June 18, 2014	Delicious Deli Records; Universal Music Japan	CD
Worldwide	June 18, 2014	Delicious Deli Records; Universal Music Japan	digital download

== Charts ==
Chart	Country	Peak position
Oricon Singles Chart	Japan	1
Oricon Monthly Chart	Japan	5
