= City of the Sun (TV series) =

2015 South Korean television series

- Promotional poster
- Genre: Political, Drama
- Based on: Tetsu no Hone by Jun Ikeido
- Written by: Jung Jae-hong; Im Ri-ra; Park Ki-hyung
- Directed by: Park Ki-hyung; Jung Heung-soon
- Starring: Kim Joon; Jung Min; Song Min-jung; Jung Joo-yeon; Kim Sung-kyung
- Country of origin: South Korea
- Original language: Korean
- No. of episodes: 16

Production
- Production location: Korea

Original release
- Network: MBC Dramanet
- Release: January 30 – April 7, 2015

City of the Sun (Korean: 태양의 도시; RR: Taeyangui dosi) is a 2015 South Korean television series based on the Japanese novel Bones of Steel (鉄の骨, Tetsu no Hone) by Jun Ikeido. Starring Kim Joon, Jung Min, Song Min-jung, Jung Joo-yeon and Kim Sung-kyung, it aired on MBC Dramanet from January 30 to April 7, 2015 for 16 episodes.

== Cast ==
=== Main characters ===
- Kim Joon as Kang Tae-yang
- Jung Min as So Woo-jin
- Song Min-jung as Han Ji-soo
- Jung Joo-yeon as So Hye-jin
- Kim Sung-kyung as Yoon Sun-hee

=== Supporting characters ===
- Im Dae-ho as Park Yoon-sik
- Jung Han-yong as Bae Myung-je
- Yoon Seung-won as Company president So
- Son Min-suk as Kkangdagu Park
- Seo Ji-yeon as So Eun-jin
- Lee Hee-suk as Choi Dae-won
- Ha Yoon-hee as Choi Yoon-hee/Choi Ki-ja
- Dabi as Jo Min-joo
- Kim Kyung-ryong
- Kim Joon-goo
- Kim Deok-hyun
- Shim Yang-hong
- Ahn Sang-tae
- Yoon Taek
- Heo Sung-tae as detective.
