= Detectives in Trouble =

- Promotional poster for Detectives in Trouble
- Also known as: Crime Squad
- Genre: Police procedural
- Written by: Park Sung-jin; Lee Soo-hyun; Heo Ji-young
- Directed by: Kwon Kye-hong
- Starring: Song Il-kook; Song Ji-hyo; Lee Jong-hyuk
- Ending theme: "Believe" by T-Max
- Country of origin: South Korea
- No. of episodes: 16

Production
- Executive producers: Jung Hae-ryong; Heo Dong-woo; Kwon Jung-woo
- Producers: Yoon Sung-sik; Lee Eun-jin
- Running time: Mondays and Tuesdays at 21:55 (KST)
- Production companies: Newday Pictures; Dream Star Company

Original release
- Network: Korean Broadcasting System
- Release: March 7 – April 26, 2011

Detectives in Trouble (Korean: 강력반; Hanja: 強力班; RR: Gangnyeokban; lit. 'Crime Squad') is a 2011 South Korean police procedural television series starring Song Il-kook, Lee Jong-hyuk, Song Ji-hyo, Park Sun-young, Jang Hang-sun, Sung Ji-ru and Kim Joon. It aired on KBS2 from March 7 to April 26, 2011 on Mondays and Tuesdays at 21:55 for 16 episodes.

== Plot ==
Based on real-life cases, this Korean drama focuses on a group of detectives in the Seoul Gangnam Police Homicide Division who solve crimes with their variety of skills and investigative methods. At the forefront of the team is the hotheaded detective Park Se-hyuk and the cold, commanding police chief, Jung Il-do. Se-hyuk's impulsive, act-first-think-later methods, instincts honed on the streets, and pesky habit of threatening resignation clashes with his superior Il-do's strict, by-the-book style. The two also share a painful past, with Il-do being the detective on the case involving the death of Se-hyuk's daughter. Along with tenacious reporter Jo Min-joo and the rest of the homicide squad, they must now overcome their differences to solve crimes together.

== Cast ==
=== Main cast ===
- Song Il-kook as Park Se-hyuk

A hot headed detective with an act-first-think-later behavior. He's the father of Hae-in, and joins the police force to help find the truth about his daughter's death. He has a bad relation with his superior Jung Il-do, as he believes that Jung Il-do caused his daughter's death.

- Lee Jong-hyuk as Jung Il-do

Team leader of Homicide Department Team 2, and later the director.

- Song Ji-hyo as Jo Min-joo

A hot blooded reporter working for shocking.com. She works with Park Se-hyuk and gets exclusive news from the homicide department cases, and at the same time aids them in their investigations. She has a crush on Park Se-hyuk.

- Park Sun-young as Heo Eun-young

Mother of Hae-in. Divorced wife of Park Se-hyuk.

- Sunwoo Sun as Jin Mi-sook

A police who dreams of joining the homicide department. Before joining the department, she worked as a patrol police and had the nickname cold feet, as she would always freeze in front of criminals and thus lose them. She dies in ep 7-8 to save a high school girl from a fire accident.

- Jang Hang-sun as Team leader Kwon Young-sool

Retired team leader of Homicide Department Team 2.

- Kim Joon as Shin Dong-jin

Computer genius in Homicide Department Team 2.

- Sung Ji-ru as Nam Tae-shik

Detective in Homicide Department Team 2 who trusts Park Se-hyuk wholeheartedly. He is also the neighbor of Yoo-mi and Jo Min-joo.

- Kim Sun-kyung as Im Eun-kyung

Team leader of Homicide Department Team 2.

- Kim Jong-kook as Shua In Pang

=== Supporting cast ===
- Choo So-young as Yoon Sung-hee
- Park Joon-hyuk as Kang Sung-chul
- Joo Ho as Choi Tae-soo
- Choi Min as Byun Sang-tae
- Jang Nam-yeol as Ma Jong-pil
- Evan as Alex Lee
- Lee Yeong-hoon as Kim Young-tae
- Park Jung-woo as Kim Chul-min
- Kim Young-hoon as Ji Young-ho
- Lee El as Yoo Hye-min
- Kim Kyu-chul as Jo Sang-tae
- Oh Yong as Reporter Nam
- Lee Yeon-joo as Seol-hee
- Oh Ji-yeon as Oh Eun-joo
- Song Shi-yeon as Park Eun-ah
- Baek Seung-hee as Shin Yoo-mi
- Kim Yoo-bin as Park Hae-in, Se-hyuk's daughter

=== Guests ===
- Jo Jae-yoon as Yang Do-soo (ep. 1)
- Hwang Kwang-hee as Hyun-soo (ep. 1)
- Lee Min-woo as Lee Dong-suk (ep. 1-3)
- Kim Yoon-hye^{1} as Lee So-min (ep. 7-8)
- Won Jong-rye as Il-do's mother (ep. 13)

== Production ==
Kim Seung-woo was originally cast in the role of Jung Il-do, but dropped out for personal reasons a month before the show's premiere and was replaced by Lee Jong-hyuk.

Sunwoo Sun left the drama after episode 7, reportedly due to her dissatisfaction with how her character was written. She was written out, and replaced on the "squad" by Kim Sun-kyung.

== Notes ==
- ^{1}Credited as Woori.
