= Happy Famba =

- Born: Hassan Ibrahim; 17 May 1982 (age 44)
- Origin: Burundi
- Genres: Afropop, Afrobeat, Zouk
- Occupation: Singer
- Instrument: Vocals
- Years active: 2008–present
- Labels: Kora Entertainment; African Sound Records

Hassan Ibrahim (born 17 May 1982), better known by his stage name, Happy Famba, is a Burundian recording artist, singer, songwriter and performer.

== Biography ==
Ibrahim was born on 17 May 1982, in Buyenzi, Burundi, at the Prince Regent Charles Hospital, to Burundian parents Hassan Karunguka and Celine Kiyaboba. In 1997. When he was 15 years old, his mother was killed. His father died in 1999.

== History ==
In 2000, the Orchestra Happy World Centre Jeune Kamenge hired Happy Famba as "Framer of Dance". It was an opportunity for him to learn to sing. In 2003, he released his first song, "Ndani Ya Club". This placed him in the ranks of popular singers in Burundi. In the same year, PSI Burundi signed him to a contract for a tour in the provinces of the country during the campaign against AIDS.

In 2007, he released the song "My Dear", and he released "Shamila" in 2008, with the participation of Mr. Blue from Tanzania. That year, he also released "Baby Girl" (featuring Jay Fire), "Naogopa" (featuring Black-G), and performed in several shows in Congo and Rwanda.

In 2010, the singer Kidum offered to help during Happy Famba's Burundi Primusic tour and also participated in the Fespade festival in Rwanda.

On the occasion of International Women's Day in 2013, the same day of the launch of his album, Happy Mamba gave a free-admission concert to honor the memory of his mother, who didn't have the opportunity to see him perform. On 1 May 2014, during the ceremonies of the day of international workers, he made a proposal to five musicians to sing the song "Abakozi" with him for Pierre Nkurunziza, President of the Republic of Burundi.

During the month of February 2014, he met a Manager called Takis, who has a recording studio called African Sound Records, with whom he later signed.

Happy Famba started 2015 with two singles, "Ni Wewe" and "Collabo" (featuring Channy Queen & Krazy Bright), the fourth and fifth songs from his album Collabo.

== Discography ==
The discography of Happy Famba consists of two studio albums.

=== Studio albums ===
Title	Album details	Peak chart positions				Certifications	Sales
Title	Album details	BDI	EAC			Certifications	Sales
My Dear	Released: 2014; Label: Multi Talents; Format: CD, digital download	–	—	—	—		
Collabo	Released: 8 March 2015; Label: African Sound Records; Format: CD, digital download	–	—	—	—		
"—" denotes a recording that did not chart or was not released in that territory.

=== Music videos ===
As lead artist

List of music videos as lead artist, showing date released and directors
Title	Video release date	Director(s)	Ref
"FootBolla"	12 novembre 2015	Kent-P	
"Ni Wewe"	19 April 2015	Enos Olik	
"Ndacagukunda"	24 November 2014	Kent-P	
"Jigi Jigiwe"	12 May 2014	Kent-P	
"Baby Girl" (featuring Jay Fire)	1 November 2013	Guerra Man	
"Rafikis"	7 November 2013	Keshy	
"Inawezekana" (featuring Sharobaro)	20 September 2013	Guerra Man	
"Naogopa" (featuring Black-G)	15 November 2012	Jean Marie Ndiho	
"Shamilla" (featuring Mr Blue & R-FLow)	22 May 2011	Bizuli	
"My Dear" (featuring Jay Fire)	7 March 2011	Paci Nz	

== Awards and nominations ==
=== Top Ten Tube Music Awards ===
Year	Nominee / work	Award	Result
2013	Jigi Jigiwe	Video of the Year	Nominated

=== Isanganiro Awards ===
Year	Nominee / work	Award	Result
2011	My Dear	Song of the Year	Nominated
