= Kim Sung-kyung =

South Korean entertainer (born 1972)

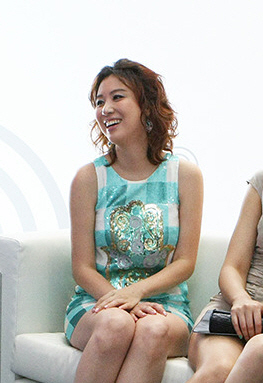
- Kim in 2010
- Born: February 15, 1972 (age 54); Seoul, South Korea
- Education: Hongik University (B.A. in Education); Yonsei University (M.A. in Journalism and Mass Communication)
- Occupations: Television personality; actress
- Years active: 1993–present
- Agent: Box Media
- Spouses: Choi Yeon-taek (m. 1996; div. 2000) Unknown (m. 2021)
- Children: 1
- Family: Kim Sung-ryung (sister)

Korean name
- Hangul: 김성경
- Hanja: 金成景
- RR: Gim Seonggyeong
- MR: Kim Sŏnggyŏng

Kim Sung-kyung (Korean: 김성경; born February 15, 1972) is a South Korean television personality and actress. Kim joined the broadcasting network SBS in 1993 as a news presenter, notably as the weekend anchor for the SBS Eight O'Clock News. She left SBS in 2002 to go freelance, and also became a planning director for the "edutainment" company SangSang and I in 2007. Kim made her acting debut in 2014 (her older sister is actress Kim Sung-ryung), and has appeared in Korean dramas such as City of the Sun (2015).

== Filmography ==
=== News/variety programs ===
Year	Title	Network	Notes
2001–2002	SBS Eight O'Clock News	SBS	Weekend anchor
2002	SBS News Parade	SBS	
2003	The Pursuit of Happiness with Go Do-won and Kim Sung-kyung	CBS Radio	DJ
2004	Live Today with Kim Sung-kyung	MBN	Host
2007–2008	Lively Well-being Tech	Science TV	Host
2007	Pandora's Box with Kim Sung-kyung	O'live	Host
2008–2010	E! News Korea	SBS funE	Host
2009	SBS Economy & Life	SBS	Host
2011	Brunch	tvN	Host
2011	Couples Counseling: Doctor K	tvN	Host
2011	Two Men's Questionable Adult Show	KBS2	Fixed guest
2011–2014	Good Day	MBC	Host
2011	Friendly Doctors	Channel A	Host
2012	Let's Go, World Cup!	SBS	
2013–present	TV Art Stage	MBC	Host
2013–present	Powerful Opponents	TV Chosun	
2014	Single Lady	Channel A	
2014	Middle School Unified History Quiz Show: History and War	MBC	Host
2015–present	100 Years	TV Chosun	

=== Television series ===
Year	Title	Role
2014	Cheongdam-dong Scandal	Dr. Yoon
2015	City of the Sun	Yoon Sun-hee

=== Film ===
Year	Title	Role
2003	The First Amendment of Korea	Anchor
2005	The Twins	MBN anchor
2013	Top Star	News anchor 1 (cameo)
2022	20th Century Girl	Na Bo-ra's mother
