= Spoks Man =

Burundian singer-songwriter (born 1992)

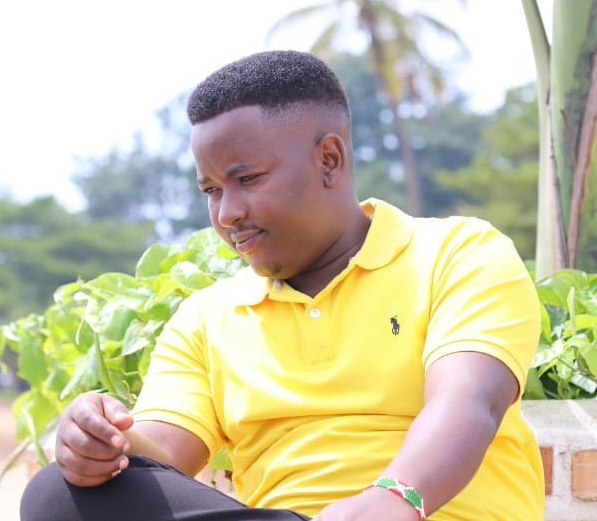

Background information
- Born: Dushimirimana Eric; 15 April 1992 (age 34); Bwiza, Bujumbura, Burundi
- Origin: Bujumbura
- Genres: Buja flava, afro-pop, afro beat
- Occupations: Singer, songwriter, dancer, talk show host, newscaster
- Instruments: Vocals, piano, guitar, drums
- Years active: 2009–present
- Label: Independent

Dushimirimana Eric (born 15 April 1992), better known by his stage name Spoks Man, is a Burundian singer-songwriter, talk show host and news presenter at Dushi Entertainment, in Bujumbura, Burundi.

== Early life and education ==
Spoks Man was born on 15 April 1992 in Bujumbura. He grew up in a Catholic family and spent most of his childhood in Bwiza, Marie de Bujumbura, where he took his first steps in music. Influenced by the Congolese musical group Makoma, Spoks Man started dancing for money on the streets and in cultural centers.

== Career ==
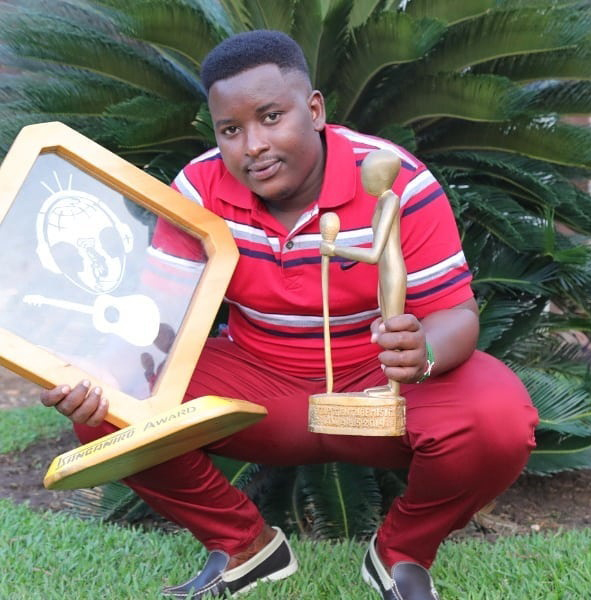
Spoks Man with his Isanganiro awards in 2015

In 2006, Spoks Man began working with record producer Jeremy Production, who produced the songs "Warambaniye" and "Umwana" for him. He left Jeremy Production three years later, advertising for new management from national telecommunication companies, including two for Ucom in 2009 and one for Smart Communications in 2010.

In the studio of High Level Record in 2011, Spoks Man produced the song "Iherezo ryiza" and his video clip produced by Johnny B of Mira Mira Film. With several other Burundian artists, they collaborated on his song "Abamenyeshamakuru". In 2012, he became a disc jockey in his new studio, High Vision Studio, in a northern district of Bujumbura called Mutanga-Nord.

Spoks Man produced the song "Ndatemutse" featuring artists 19th and Dj Preeze 36. The song was remastered in the High Level Record studio by Dj Goz before its official launch in June 2013. One month later, he produced the video clip for "Ndatemutse" again with Johnny B, which became a Burundian hit single and latter with his song "Burundi" won the 2013 Isanganiro Award, organized annually by Radio Isanganiro.

From 2014, Spoks Man produced several other songs, some of them in collaboration with other renowned Burundian artists. That August he recorded on the same song with Mkombozi, "Siko nabisanze"; it was even produced on the song "Nzobiki murikazoza" by Ayo Lizer, currently on the Tanzanian label WCB Wasafi alongside the multi-award bongo fleva artist Diamond Platnumz.

In 2017, he left his musical career to focus on journalism. Currently Spoks Man is presenter of Top10, B-News of the private television channel Best Entertainment Television (BeTV), headquartered in Bujumbura.

== Awards and nominations ==
- 2013 : Isanganiro Awards winner, organized annually by Radio Isanganiro

== Discography ==
=== Albums ===
- Siko nabisanze ft. Mkombozi (2013)
- Ndatemutse ft. 19th (2013)
- Agakuku (2013)
- Nzobiki muri kazoza (2014)
- Burundi (2014)
- Utayaona (2015)
- Iherez ryiza (2016)
- Abamenyeshamakuru (2016)
- Celibataire ft. B-Face (2016)
- Amahera (2017)
- Mwarihe? (2017)
- Ndakumbuye iwacu (2017)

=== Singles ===
- "Warambaniye" (2009)
- "Wmwana" ft. Nelly Merveille (2009)
- "Ndeganye" ft. Dj Dadddy (2010)
- "Iherezo" (2011)
- "Abamenyesha makuru" (2011)
- "Vyasosumo" ft. 19th, Dj Preeze 36 (2013)
- "Twoterimbere" (2014)
- "Ndi impunzi" (2015)
