= DJ Ira =

Rwandan DJ (born 1997)

Iradukunda Grace Divine, commonly known as DJ Ira (born September 7, 1997) is a Burundian disc jockey and businesswoman based in Rwanda.

DJ Ira has played in many different concerts. DJ Ira officially became a Rwandan citizen after President Kagame granted Rwandan citizenship to her.

== Early life and education ==
Dj Ira was born in Gitega. She entered university in 2017, where she studied information technology.

== Career ==
In 2015, Ira visited her cousin, DJ Bisoso, who was living in Rwanda and decided to become a DJ as well after seeing the profit Bisoso made in one night. He helped train her, and she began deejaying the same year, sending some of her profits to her family in Burundi. She began gaining popularity in 2016.

=== Events ===
- Primus Guma Guma (3 years)
- Miss Rwanda (6 years).
- Intsinzi Concert (RPF) 2017.
- BAL (Basketball Africa League)3Years.
- BAL for her 2 years.
- Afrobasket 2020.
- Hanga Pitchfest 2022.
- YouthConnekt 2022
- Fiba World Cup qualifiers 2022.
- Pele Stadium inauguration 2023.
- Afrobasket Women 2023.
- Fiba Africa U16 qualifiers 2023.
- Giants of Africa 2023.
- Trace Awards 2023.
- Fiba Africa Women's Basketball League 2023.
- Time 100.
- FLL&AI Hackathon 2024.
- Amahoro Stadium inauguration 2024.
- Presidential campaign of 2024.
- Intsinzi Concert (RPF) 2024.
- RPF Cocktail Party 2024.
- Presidential inauguration od 2024.
- FIBA WWC Prequalifiers 2024.
- YouthConnekt Africa Summit 2024.
- OTP End of Year Party (4 years)
- 6th Africa's Business Heroes Summit &Grand Final 2025
