= T-max =

South Korean band

T-Max 티 맥스
- Origin: South Korea
- Genres: K-pop, J-pop, pop, boy band
- Years active: 2007–2012
- Label: Planet 905
- Past members: Kim Joon; Shin Min Chul; Park Yun Hwa; Joo Chan Yang; Park Han Bi

T-Max (Korean: 티 맥스), stylized T-MAX or T.max, was a South Korean pop music group formed in 2007 under the label 2Step Entertainment (later Planet 905). The group began as a trio, where the "T" in its name was derived from the words "triple" and "trinity". T-Max released an album, an EP, five singles, some of which have songs different from its title, and several soundtrack singles for television shows such as Boys Over Flowers, Detectives in Trouble, and Master of Study. Its members have pursued individual acting gigs in dramas, sitcoms, and musicals.

== History ==
T-Max began with three members: Kim Joon, Shin Min Chul and Park Yun Hwa, formed under 2Step Entertainment. Shin was a former member of the boy band B.O.K. and sang on soundtrack songs "Dan Nyum" (Sang Doo! Let's Go to School) and "Tears" (Strange Woman Strange Men). Park Yun Hwa was a former contestant in Battle Shinhwa, a 2005 television contest to create a new boy band. T-Max's first single, "Blooming", was released on July 19, 2007. The group performed on music shows such as MNet's M! Countdown, Show Music Tank and Music Bank. A second single, "Lion Heart", followed on November 30. On December 29, 2008, the group released a third single, Run To You, which featured the track "Neol Saranghae" (Korean: 널 사랑해, My Love).

The members of T-max got involved in television projects for 2009. Park Yun Hwa was on a SBS show called “Mak Ban Shi” (Idol Maknae Rebellion), which showcased the youngest members of various idol groups: participants included Dongho of U-Kiss, Seunghyun of FT Island, Jinwoon of 2AM and Shorry of Mighty Mouth. Shin sang "Last Hero" for the historical drama series The Return of Iljimae.

When Kim landed a starring role as high school "prince" Song Woo Bin in the Korean live-action adaptation of Boys Over Flowers, T-Max was selected to do the theme song "Paradise", which brought the group fame. Other Boys Over Flowers tracks followed, including "Say Yes" and "Wish Ur My Love". A Japanese version called "Motto Paradise" was released on September 2. The group participated in the F4 special edition of the Boys Over Flowers soundtrack, which included "Nappeun Maeumeul Meokgehae", among other tracks. On July 15, T-Max released an EP Single Collection, which featured three solo tracks; each of which was sung by a different member. The group released the digital single Love Parade on September 3, which featured the track "Wonhae" (Korean: 원해, Want).

In 2010, T-Max contributed original soundtrack (OST) singles for Master of Study and Fuyu No Sonata. Park Yun Hwa also collaborated with 4Minute member Hyuna on the song "Last Winter" which is found on a different Love Parade single released in February 2010. With Park Yun Hwa's plan to leave the group to fulfill his military service, T-Max added two new members to the group: Joo Chan Yang was a former Superstar K contestant, and Park Han Bi was new to the music scene. The group released the studio album Born to the MAX in June.

T-Max contributed to soundtrack singles "Believe" and "Sesangkkeuteseo" for the Detectives in Trouble series in 2011. On September 29, Kim departed from the group for his military service. Prior to Kim’s enlistment, T-Max released one last single "Geunyeoga Ureo" (Korean: 그녀가 울어, She Was Crying), a ballad which tells of a man’s confession and seeking forgiveness, and describes the pain of farewell from his lover. On January 4, 2012, the group officially disbanded, with its members to embark on solo careers in music or acting. Yoon Jung Soo, the CEO of Planet 905, said, “They’re a group like real brothers to me, and I truly did all I could for them, so I wanted to take in whatever decision they chose. I told them that they could return as T-Max whenever they wanted to.”

== Influence ==
In October 2013, at a fan event in Singapore, the cast of the South Korean variety show Running Man showed a video montage of themselves in the roles of the Boys Over Flowers guys, and then appeared onstage where they sang T-Max's "Paradise".

== Members ==
T-max had five different members over its lifetime. Shin Min-chul (신민철) and Kim Joon (Kim Hyung-jun 김형준) were members from 2007 to 2011. Park Yun-hwa (박윤화) was a member from 2007 to 2010. Park Han-bi (박한비) and Joo Chan-yang (주찬양) were members from 2010 to 2011.

== Discography ==
=== Studio albums ===
Title	Album details	Peak chart positions	Sales
Title	Album details	KOR	Sales
Born to the MAX	Released: May 28, 2010; Label: Planet905; Formats: CD, digital download	—	—N/a
"—" denotes release did not chart.

=== Extended plays ===
Title	Album details	Peak chart positions	Sales
Title	Album details	KOR	Sales
Single Collection	Released: July 9, 2009; Label: Planet905; Formats: CD, digital download	—N/a	—N/a

=== Singles ===
Title	Year	Peak chart positions	Album
Title	Year	KOR	Album
"Blooming"	2007	—N/a	Non-album singles
"Lion Heart"	2007	—N/a	Non-album singles
"Bang Bang Boom" (널 사랑해)	2008	—N/a	Non-album singles
"Jun Be O.K" (준비 O.K)	2009	—N/a	Single Collection
"Want" (원해)	2009	—N/a	Non-album single
"All I Can Say" (해줄 수 있는 말)	2010	70	Born to the MAX
"Don't Be Rude" (까불지마)	2010	79	Born to the MAX
"She's Crying" (그녀가 울어)	2011	—	Non-album single
"—" denotes release did not chart.

=== Soundtrack appearances ===
Title	Year	Peak chart positions	Album
Title	Year	KOR	Album
"Paradise"	2009	—N/a	Boys Over Flowers OST
"Say Yes"	2009	—N/a	Boys Over Flowers OST
"Wish Ur My Love" feat. J.ae	2009	—N/a	Boys Over Flowers OST
"Fight the Bad Feeling" (나쁜 마음을 먹게해)	2009	—N/a	F4 Special Edition
"At Least Once" (한번쯤은)	2010	33	Master of Study OST
"Believe"	2011	—	Detectives in Trouble OST
"—" denotes release did not chart.

== Awards and nominations ==
Year	Award	Category	Nominated work	Result
2009	Mnet Asian Music Awards	Best OST	"Paradise"	Nominated
