= Boys Over Flowers (South Korean TV series) =

2009 South Korean television series

- Promotional poster
- Also known as: Boys Before Flowers
- Hangul: 꽃보다 남자
- Hanja: 꽃보다 男子
- RR: Kkotboda namja
- MR: Kkotpoda namja
- Genre: Romance; Comedy; Drama
- Based on: Boys Over Flowers by Yoko Kamio
- Written by: Yoon Ji-ryun
- Directed by: Jeon Ki-sang
- Starring: Koo Hye-sun; Lee Min-ho; Kim Hyun-joong; Kim Bum; Kim Joon
- Opening theme: "Paradise" by T-Max
- Ending theme: "Because I'm Stupid" by SS501; "Making a Lover" by SS501
- Composer: Oh Joon-sung (오준성)
- Country of origin: South Korea
- Original language: Korean
- No. of episodes: 25

Production
- Executive producer: Kim Hyeong-il (KBS Drama Headquarters)
- Producer: Gwak Jeong-hwan (KBS Drama Operations Team)
- Production locations: South Korea; Macau; New Caledonia
- Production company: Group 8

Original release
- Network: KBS2
- Release: January 5 – March 31, 2009

Related
- Hana yori Dango (audio drama, 1993–1994, Japan); Hana yori Dango (film) (1995, Japan); Meteor Garden (2001, Taiwan); Hana Yori Dango (2005, Japan); Meteor Garden (2018, China); F4 Thailand: Boys Over Flowers (2021, Thailand)

Boys Over Flowers (Korean: 꽃보다 남자; RR: Kkotboda namja) is a 2009 South Korean television series starring Koo Hye-sun, Lee Min-ho, Kim Hyun-joong, Kim Bum, and Kim Joon. Based on the Japanese manga series Boys Over Flowers (花より男子, Hana Yori Dango) which was written and illustrated by Yoko Kamio, the series, directed by Jeon Si-Kang, tells a story of a working-class girl who gets tangled up in the lives of a group of wealthy young men in her elite high school. It aired for 25 episodes on KBS2 from January 5 to March 31, 2009.

It is often regarded as a pioneer in Korean high school series, as well as to have helped the proliferation of the "Korean Wave". The series earned high viewership ratings in South Korea, and became a cultural phenomenon throughout Asia. Lee Min-ho's role as the leader of F4 completely contrasted his role in Mackerel Run, which earned him overseas popularity.

== Synopsis ==
Shinhwa Group is one of South Korea's largest conglomerates, led by Chairwoman Kang Hee-soo (Lee Hye-young). Her son, Gu Jun-pyo (Lee Min-ho), the heir to the Shinhwa empire, attends Shinhwa High School, an elite institution for the children of the wealthy and powerful. Jun-pyo leads F4, the most influential group at the school, alongside Yoon Ji-hoo (Kim Hyun-joong), So Yi-jung (Kim Bum), and Song Woo-bin (Kim Joon).

Geum Jan-di (Koo Hye-sun), the daughter of a dry-cleaner, draws national attention after saving a Shinhwa High student from attempting suicide. In response to public backlash, Chairwoman Kang arranges for Jan-di to enroll at the school on a scholarship. At Shinhwa High, Jan-di immediately clashes with Jun-pyo after standing up to him and refusing to submit to the school's culture of bullying enforced by F4. She becomes the target of severe harassment, including the issuance of a "red card", but continues to resist.

Jan-di grows close to Ji-hoo, who remains emotionally affected by his first love, Min Seo-hyun (Han Chae-young), a former Shinhwa student who left Korea to pursue a career. Seo-hyun later returns to Korea, briefly reconnecting with Ji-hoo before leaving again.

Although initially hostile toward Jan-di, Jun-pyo gradually develops feelings for her. He later makes a public declaration at school, announcing that Jan-di is his girlfriend. Following this announcement, Oh Min-ji (Lee Si-young), a friend of Jan-di who becomes resentful of her growing attention and association with Jun-pyo, orchestrates an incident that falsely implies Jan-di had slept around. Believing the allegations, Jun-pyo feels deeply betrayed and distances himself from her, while the student body resumes bullying Jan-di. The truth is later revealed, and Min-ji's actions are exposed. Jun-pyo realizes his mistake, apologizes to Jan-di, and publicly defends her, strengthening their relationship, while Min-ji leaves the school.

As Jan-di spends more time with Ji-hoo, she becomes emotionally conflicted, particularly after the two share a kiss. Jun-pyo witnesses the kiss between Jan-di and Ji-hoo, leaving him feeling deeply hurt and betrayed. This leads to a confrontation between the two friends, straining the bond within F4. Jun-pyo distances himself from both Jan-di and Ji-hoo, while Jan-di struggles with guilt and confusion over her feelings. Ji-hoo later acknowledges Jun-pyo's feelings for Jan-di and chooses to step aside, prioritizing their friendship.

Meanwhile, Jan-di's best friend Chu Ga-eul (Kim So-eun) becomes involved with F4 member So Yi-jung, a womanizer with unresolved emotional trauma. As their relationship develops, Yi-jung gradually confronts his fear of commitment, and the two form a meaningful bond that continues throughout the series.

Chairwoman Kang strongly opposes Jun-pyo and Jan-di's relationship due to Jan-di's social status and repeatedly intervenes to separate them, going as far as interfering with Jan-di's family and shutting down their dry-cleaning business.

Jan-di is later kidnapped by a student seeking revenge against F4. While attempting to protect Jun-pyo, she sustains a serious shoulder injury that permanently ends her swimming career. The incident strengthens Jun-pyo's determination to protect Jan-di, while escalating Chairwoman Kang's efforts to keep them apart.

After Jun-pyo's father falls into a coma, Jun-pyo is forced to prepare as the successor to the Shinhwa Group. Under pressure from his mother, he leaves Korea for Macau, cutting off contact with Jan-di and his friends. Chairwoman Kang later arranges his engagement to JK Group heiress Ha Jae-kyung (Lee Min-jung). Although Ha develops feelings for Jun-pyo, she later calls off the engagement after realizing his feelings for Jan-di.

Jun-pyo later loses his memory following a car accident while saving Ji-hoo. Initially unable to recognize Jan-di, his memories gradually return. The two reunite and decide to pursue their individual goals before marriage. Several years later, Jun-pyo returns as a successful businessman and reunites with Jan-di and the members of F4, where he proposes to Jan-di at the seaside.

== Cast ==
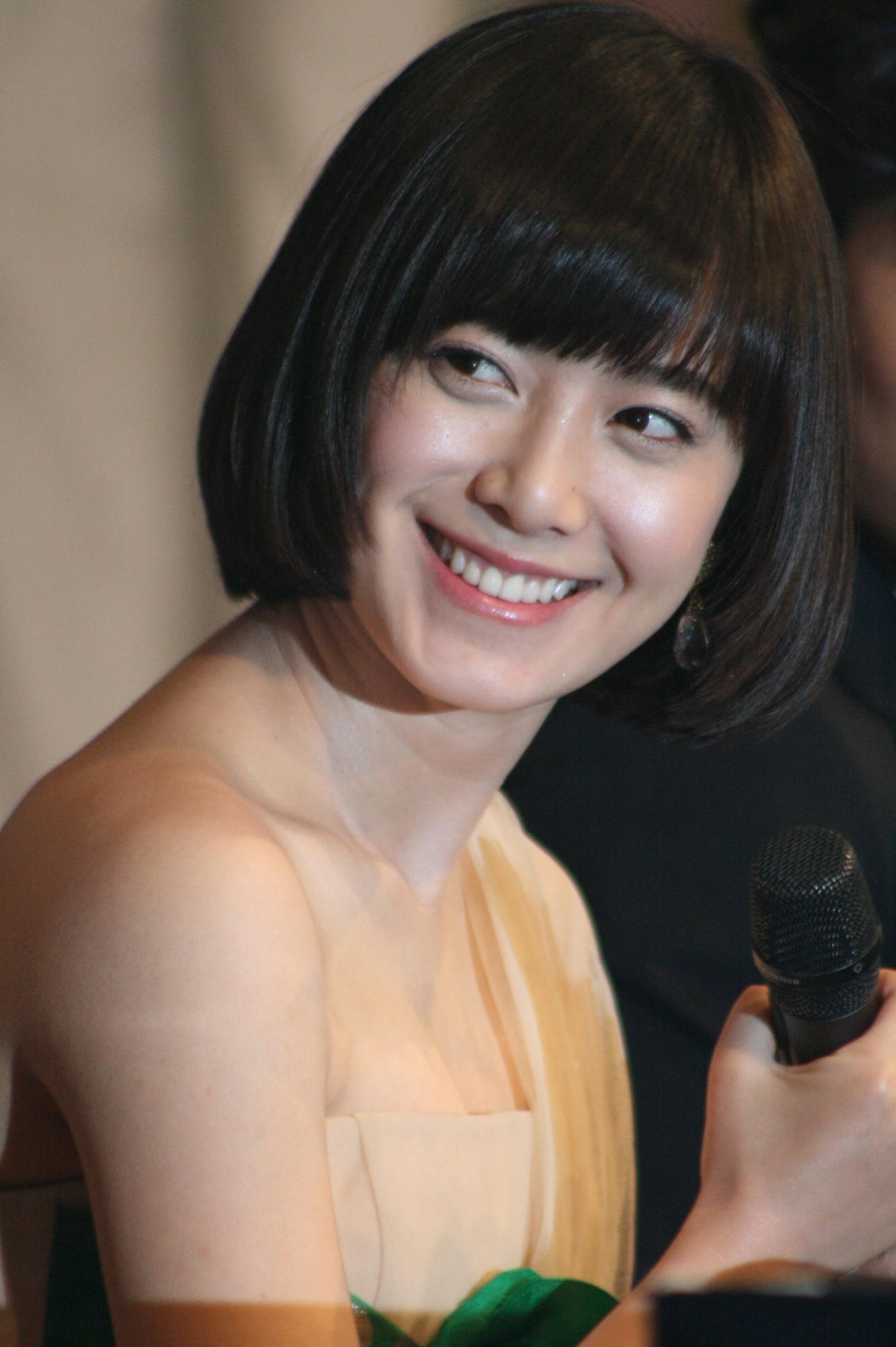
Koo Hye-sun as Geum Jan-di

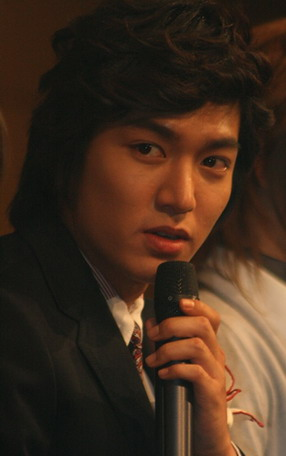
Lee Min-ho as Gu Jun-pyo

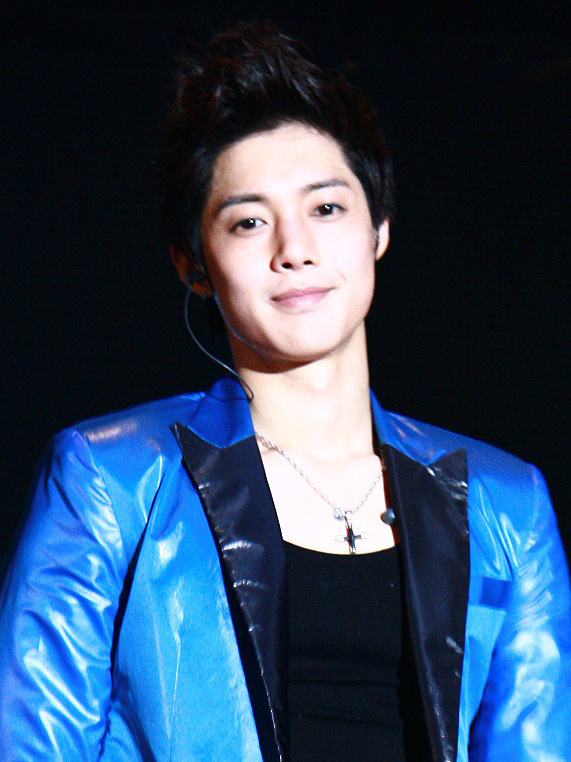
Kim Hyun-joong as Yoon Ji-hoo

=== Main ===
Actor	Drama character	Manga character	Characteristics
Koo Hye-sun	Geum Jan-di (금잔디)	Tsukushi Makino	A dry cleaner's daughter, who is offered a scholarship to attend the prestigious Shinhwa High School. Her name translates as "lawn/grass". Headstrong, optimistic, stubborn, and kind-hearted, Jan-di readily stands up for her friends when they are being bullied. She gets on Jun-pyo's bad side when she stands up to him, but he soon professes his feelings for her. She also seems to initially like and have a crush on Ji-hoo. But after many complications in her life she realises that she loves Gu Jun-pyo wholeheartedly.
Lee Min-ho	Gu Jun-pyo (구준표)	Tsukasa Domyoji	The leader of the F4 and heir to the Shinhwa Group, one of the biggest companies in South Korea. His mother is a cruel woman who believes that only beneficial relationships are allowed. He is hot-tempered and believes that there is nothing that money can't buy. Though he's unable to express his feelings, deep down, he has a heart of gold. He always tries to protect Jan-di even if it means hurting his own feelings. He torments Jan-di after she stands up to his bullying ways, but ends up falling in love with her and does everything to protect her.
Kim Hyun-joong	Yoon Ji-hoo (윤지후)	Rui Hanazawa	A member of the F4 and the grandson of a former president of Korea. He has a driving phobia after being involved in a car accident that killed his parents and left him the only survivor. He is initially in love with his childhood friend Seo-hyun, who helped him overcome his social anxiety. Calm and gentle, his musical talent catches Jan-di's attention and she begins to develop feelings for him. After spending time with Jan-di on his returning he falls in love with Geum Jan-di. He tries to express it several times but Jan-di refuses, but he loves her till the end.
Kim Bum	So Yi-jung (소이정)	Sojiro Nishikado	A member of the F4 and a skilled potter. His family owns the country's biggest art museum. After losing his first love to his brother, he becomes a womanizer. He eventually changes his playboy ways when he realizes that he likes Ga-eul, Jan-di's best friend.
Kim Joon	Song Woo-bin (송우빈)	Akira Mimasaka	A member of the F4, his family runs the country's largest construction company, which Woo-bin later admits has strong connections to organized crime. He also likes to mess around with girls since he was hurt by a previous woman in his life. However, he has excellent business sense and is very charismatic.

=== Supporting ===
Actor	Drama Character	Manga character	Characteristics
Ahn Suk-hwan	Geum Il-bong (금일봉)	Haruo Makino	He is Jan-di's father. Although a loving father, he brings financial problems to the family.
Im Ye-jin	Na Gong-joo (나공주)	Chieko Makino	She is Jan-di's mother. Desperate to get Jan-di married to a rich man, she forces Jan-di to attend Shinhwa High School.
Kim So-eun	Chu Ga-eul (추가을)	Yuki Matsuoka	She is Jan-di's best friend. She is quite devoted towards her friendship with Jan-di. Along with the series she later develops romantic feelings towards So Yi-jung.
Han Chae-young	Min Seo-hyun (민서현)	Shizuka Todo	Ji-hoon's first love.
Lee Si-young	Oh Min-ji (오민지)	Sakurako Sanjo	She at first seems to be Jan-di's only friend at school, but later betrays her.
Kim Hyun-joo	Gu Jun-hee (구준희)	Tsubaki Domyoji	She is Gu Jun-pyo's elder sister. As the elder child, it fell upon Gu Jun-hee to raise Jun-pyo as their parents were largely absent. She did so through aggressiveness, which included hitting and kicking him. She is the only person who can control him, as he listens to her. She also defies their mother by openly supporting his relationship with Jan-di, and they become close friends.
Lee Hye-young	Kang Hee-soo (강희수)	Kaede Domyoji	She is Jun-pyo's mother. A leading businesswoman in South Korea, she uses a number of methods to separate Jan-di and Jun-pyo (a technique which she used to successfully destroy Gu Jun-hee's relationship with her boyfriend many years before).
Lee Min-jung	Ha Jae-kyung (하재경)	Shigeru Okawahara	She is Jun-pyo's fiancée. She is a strong-willed girl who is pressured into an arranged marriage with Jun-pyo by both of their families in order to merge companies. She asks to be Jan-di's friend and Jan-di cannot say no. Ha Jae-kyung does all she can to get Jun-pyo to love her, but gives up when she knows that he will always love Jan-di.

=== Extended ===
- Park Ji-bin as Geum Kang-san (금강산), Jan-di's younger brother / Manga character: Susumu Makino
- Kim Ki-bang as Bom Choon-sik (봄춘식), Jan-di and Ga-eul's boss
- Jung Ho-bin as Jeong Sang-rok (정상록), Jun-pyo's mother's secretary / Manga character: Nishida
- Song Suk-ho as Butler Lee, Jun-pyo's family's butler
- Kim Young-ok as Jun-pyo's family's head maid / Manga character: Tama
- Seo Min-ji as Jang Yu-mi (장유미) / Manga character: Umi Nakajima
- Lee Jung-gil as Yoon Seok-young (윤석영), Ji-hoo's grandfather
- Lim Ju-hwan as So Il-hyun (소일현), Yi-jung's older brother
- Park Soo-jin as Cha Eun-jae (차은재), Yi-jung's first love / Manga character: Sara Hinata
- Gook Ji-yun as Choi Jin-hee (최진희) (aka Ginger) / Manga character: Yuriko Asai
- Jang Ja-yeon as Park Sun-ja (박선자) (aka Sunny) / Manga character: Erika Ayuhara
- Min Young-won as Lee Mi-sook (이미숙) (aka Miranda) / Manga character: Minako Yamano
- Jung Eui-chul as Lee Min-ha (이민하) / Lee Jae-ha (이재하). He also falls for Geum Jan-di for her behaviour. / Manga character: Junpei Oribe
- Jung Chan-woo as young Gu Jun-pyo (uncredited)
- Kang San as young Yoon Ji-hu (uncredited)
- Moonbin as young So Yi-jung
- Kang Yu-seok as young Song Woo-bin (uncredited)
- Kang Han-byeol as child Gu Jun-pyo
- Nam Da-reum as child Yoon Ji-hoon
- Jung Tae-ho as child So Yi-jung (uncredited)
- Lee Eun-soo as child Song Woo-bin (uncredited)
- Lim Si-eun as young Min Seo-hyun
- Kim Young-sun as Fishing village resident 3 (cameo)

Source: HanCinema

== Original soundtrack ==
Boys Over Flowers Original Sound Track Part 1

Soundtrack album by Various Artists
- Released: January 8, 2009
- Genre: K-pop

Part 1
No.	Title	Artist	Length
1.	"Paradise"	T-Max	4:23
2.	"Because I'm Stupid"	SS501	4:20
3.	"Do You Know?"	Someday	4:12
4.	"Stand By Me"	Shinee	4:05
5.	"Lucky"	Ashily	4:00
6.	"Starlight Tear"	Kim Yoo-kyung	4:04
7.	"Some"	Seo Jin-young	4:42
8.	"One More Time"	Tree Bicycle	4:23
9.	"I Know (Saxophone Inst.)"	Oh Jun-seong and Lee Jung-sik	2:04
10.	"Dance With Me (Inst.)"	Oh Jun-seong	1:47
11.	"Blue Flower (Inst.)"	Oh Jun-seong	1:46
12.	"So Sad (Inst.)"	Oh Jun-seong	2:05
13.	"Main Title (Paradise Intro)"	Oh Jun-seong and T-Max	0:51
Total length:			42:42

Boys Over Flowers Original Sound Track Part 2

Soundtrack album by Various Artists
- Released: March 6, 2009
- Genre: K-pop

Part 2
No.	Title	Artist	Length
1.	"Say Yes"	T-Max	3:28
2.	"Wish Ur My Love"	T-Max feat. J	4:48
3.	"Yearning Heart/feeling something"	A'ST1	3:06
4.	"Making A Lover"	SS501	3:13
5.	"What Do I Do"	Jisun	4:02
6.	"Love Is Fire"	Kara	3:20
7.	"Love U"	Howl	3:41
8.	"Something Like Love"	Brand New Day	4:30
9.	"Tears Are Falling"	Lee Sang-gon	4:10
10.	"Cellogic"	Kim Young-min	2:04
11.	"Approach"	Dong Yo	1:40
12.	"Strange Sun"	Various artists	3:40
13.	"For The Sake Of Love"	Park Hye-ri	2:02
Total length:			43:44

== Reception ==
Elle Magazine ranked Boys Over Flowers #6 (out of 10) on the October 2020 10 Best K-Dramas To Binge-Watch On Netflix list. Boys Over Flowers attracted high viewership ratings and buzz throughout South Korea during its broadcast in 2009. The cast members became household names and shot to stardom overnight, and after the series ended, several of them became the faces of various endorsements and advertisements. The show is credited with launching the career of its lead actor, Lee Min-ho, who had previously appeared in a small number of low-budget high school dramas.

During its broadcast, the series influenced South Korean men to take their appearances more seriously to copy the metrosexual or "pretty boy image" (kkotminam, lit. "men as beautiful as flowers") of the F4 characters in the drama. This led to an increase in South Korean males wearing cosmetics, preppy and cruise outfits, and clothing in traditionally more feminine styles like the color pink and floral prints. The drama's local filming locations became tourist attractions, such as the Damyang Dynasty Country Club in South Jeolla Province; Ragung Hanok Hotel in Silla Millennium Park in Gyeongju, North Gyeongsang Province; Hilton Namhae Gold & Spa Resort in South Gyeongsang Province; Grand Hyatt Seoul ice rink; Lotte Hotel World's Emerald Room; Farmer's Table in Heyri; and Yangpyeong English Village. The overseas locations featured such as New Caledonia and Macau also became sought-after holiday destinations.

The series' international popularity extended to Japan, Thailand, Vietnam, Singapore, India, Nepal, Malaysia, Taiwan, Sri Lanka, and Zambia among others. The cast members held various sold-out events across Asia, such as concerts and fan meetings. The Seoul chapter of the Young Women's Christian Association (YWCA) criticized the series for being the epitome of materialism and the Cinderella complex, saying it sets a bad example for Korean dramas by depicting school violence, and teenagers indulging in pleasure and prejudice toward others based on their appearance and social class. The YWCA report also singled out the leading female character (Geum Jan-di) for being passive and dependent.

== Ratings ==
In the table below, the blue numbers represent the lowest ratings and the red numbers represent the highest ratings.

Ep.	Original broadcast date	Average audience share			
Ep.	Original broadcast date	Nielsen Korea		TNmS	
Ep.	Original broadcast date	Nationwide	Seoul	Nationwide	Seoul
1	January 5, 2009	13.7%	13.8%	14.3%	14.4%
2	January 6, 2009	16.1%	15.9%	17.6%	17.4%
3	January 12, 2009	18.2%	17.2%	20.8%	21.1%
4	January 13, 2009	17.7%	17.8%	21.4%	21.6%
5	January 19, 2009	22.2%	21.4%	24.8%	24.3%
6	January 20, 2009	23.2%	23.0%	24.8%	24.6%
7	January 26, 2009	18.1%	17.4%	19.5%	19.1%
8	January 27, 2009	22.6%	22.1%	25.9%	25.3%
9	February 2, 2009	25.8%	24.9%	29.7%	29.4%
10	February 3, 2009	26.7%	25.6%	30.5%	30.2%
11	February 9, 2009	26.2%	25.6%	31.5%	31.8%
12	February 10, 2009	27.6%	27.0%	31.4%	31.2%
13	February 16, 2009	27.6%	27.7%	31.5%	31.5%
14	February 17, 2009	27.7%	26.8%	31.9%	32.0%
15	February 23, 2009	29.2%	28.5%	32.4%	32.3%
16	February 24, 2009	30.1%	30.0%	33.2%	32.9%
17	March 3, 2009	26.6%	27.3%	29.9%	30.6%
18	March 9, 2009	32.9%	33.3%	35.5%	35.7%
19	March 10, 2009	26.6%	26.3%	31.2%	31.3%
20	March 16, 2009	30.6%	31.2%	32.6%	31.6%
21	March 17, 2009	30.8%	31.1%	33.6%	33.8%
22	March 23, 2009	29.9%	30.8%	31.8%	32.4%
23	March 24, 2009	30.3%	31.7%	31.8%	31.6%
24	March 30, 2009	29.0%	30.1%	30.2%	29.2%
25	March 31, 2009	32.7%	33.5%	34.8%	34.9%
Average		25.7%	25.6%	28.5%	28.4%

== Accolades ==
=== Awards and nominations ===
Year	Award	Category	Recipient	Result
2009	45th Baeksang Arts Awards	Best New Actor	Lee Min-ho	Won
2009	45th Baeksang Arts Awards	Popularity Award	Kim Hyun-joong	Won
2009	45th Baeksang Arts Awards	Popularity Award	Lee Min-ho	Nominated
2009	14th Asian Television Awards	Best Drama Actor	Lee Min-ho	Nominated
2009	14th Asian Television Awards	Best Drama Actress	Ku Hye-sun	Nominated
2009	3rd Mnet 20's Choice Awards	Hot Male Drama Star	Lee Min-ho	Nominated
2009	3rd Mnet 20's Choice Awards	Hot Male Drama Star	Kim Bum	Nominated
2009	3rd Mnet 20's Choice Awards	Hot Female Drama Star	Ku Hye-sun	Nominated
2009	3rd Mnet 20's Choice Awards	Hot Character ("Gu Jun-pyo")	Lee Min-ho	Nominated
2009	4th Seoul International Drama Awards	Popular Drama	Boys Over Flowers	Won
2009	4th Seoul International Drama Awards	Popular Actor	Lee Min-ho	Nominated
2009	4th Seoul International Drama Awards	Popular Actor	Kim Hyun-joong	Won
2009	Cyworld Digital Music Awards	Song of the Month (February)	"Because I'm Stupid" - SS501	Won
2009	Cyworld Digital Music Awards	Best OST	"Because I'm Stupid" - SS501	Won
2009	11th Mnet Asian Music Awards	Best OST	"Because I'm Stupid" - SS501	Won
2009	Bugs Music Awards	Best TV Drama Song of the Year	"Because I'm Stupid" - SS501	Won
2009	2nd Korea Junior Star Awards	Best New Actor in a TV Drama	Kim Hyun-joong	Won
2009	KBS Drama Awards	Top Excellence Award, Actress	Ku Hye-sun	Nominated
2009	KBS Drama Awards	Excellence Award, Actor in a Mid-length Drama	Lee Min-ho	Nominated
2009	KBS Drama Awards	Excellence Award, Actress in a Mid-length Drama	Ku Hye-sun	Won
2009	KBS Drama Awards	Best New Actor	Lee Min-ho	Won
2009	KBS Drama Awards	Best New Actor	Kim Hyun-joong	Nominated
2009	KBS Drama Awards	Best New Actor	Kim Bum	Nominated
2009	KBS Drama Awards	Best New Actress	Kim So-eun	Won
2009	KBS Drama Awards	Best Young Actor	Park Ji-bin	Nominated
2009	KBS Drama Awards	Netizen Award, Actress	Ku Hye-sun	Won
2009	KBS Drama Awards	Popularity Award, Actor	Lee Min-ho	Nominated
2009	KBS Drama Awards	Popularity Award, Actor	Kim Hyun-joong	Nominated
2009	KBS Drama Awards	Best Couple Award	Lee Min-ho and Ku Hye-sun	Won
2009	KBS Drama Awards	Best Couple Award	Kim Hyun-joong and Ku Hye-sun	Nominated

=== Listicles ===
Name of publisher, year listed, name of listicle, and placement
Publisher	Year	Listicle	Placement	Ref.
Entertainment Weekly	2025	The 21 best Korean shows on Netflix to watch now	Top 21	
