= Masterland =

Musical artist (born 1996)

- Born: Armel Chabel Marial Ngendakumana; May 20, 1996 (age 29); Muramvya, Burundi
- Genres: Afro pop; Afrobeats; R&B; Pop
- Occupations: record producer, singer, songwriter
- Instruments: Guitar, vocals
- Years active: 2012–present
- Label: Master Muzik Records

Armel Chabel Marial Ngendakumana (born May 20, 1996), professionally known as Masterland, is a Burundian record producer and recording artist.

== Career ==
Masterland moved to Ngozi in rock Bujumbura Kugasaka's Live band in 2010 but started to make a name for himself in 2012 by taking part in the Primusic contest, a project initiated by BRARUDI and aimed at discovering young talents where he was selected among the 6 finalists.

After Primusic, he embarked on a solo career with the release of his local hit singles such as "Fantastic, Ndakwubaha, Sinzohinduka, Ntundekure, Alima, ..."

He founded Master Music production, a record label company in Bujumbura, producing for various Burundian musicians. He has worked with prominent artists such as Best Life Music, Samantha, Mt Number One.

== Discography ==
As lead artist
Year	Title	Album
2016	"Fantastic" (featuring Samantha)	Non-album single
2016	"Sinzohinduka"	Non-album single
2016	"Ntundekure"	Non-album single
2017	"Alima"	Non-album single
2018	"Sabwe"	Non-album single
2018	"Rundimwo"	Non-album single

As featured artist
Year	Title	Album
2017	"Mi Wife" (Mt Number One featuring Masterland)	Non-album single
2018	"Ukwo Nyene" (Mt Number One featuring Masterland)	Non-album single

== Production discography ==
Year	Song	Artist(s)	Album
2016	"Ma Lova"	Best Life Music	Non-album single

== Awards and nominations ==
=== Buja Music Awards ===
Year	Nominee / work	Award	Result
2019		Artist of the Year	Nominated
2019	Sabwe	Song of the Year	Nominated
2019		Best Performance	Nominated
2019		Best Male Artist	Nominated
2019	Nzobikora Featuring Fabelove	Video of the Year	Won
2019		Best Music Producer	Nominated

=== Buja FM ===
Year	Award Ceremony	Prize	Work/Recipient	Result
2016	Buja Fm Hits Connection	Song of the month May	Sinzohinduka	Won

=== RFM Bujumbura ===
Year	Award Ceremony	Prize	Work/Recipient	Result
2020	RFM	Artist Of The Year	Masterland	Won
