= Vénuste Maronko =

Burundian actor, director, singer (born 1992)

- Born: September 1992 (age 33); Burundi
- Education: Lycee Technique d'informatique et d'electricite
- Occupations: Film director, actor, singer
- Years active: 2011-present

Vénuste Maronko (born September 1992) is a Burundian film director, actor, and singer.

== Biography ==
Maronko was born in Burundi in September 1992. He attended the Lycee Technique d'informatique et d'electricite. In 2011, Maronko directed his first short film, Pourquoi moi? It is a tragedy about a young girl whose family is killed and who is subsequently raped by her uncle. The film was screened at the International Festival of Cinema and Audiovisual of Burundi (FESTICAB). The film quality has been described as reminiscent of 1950s home movies. Atlanta Black Star named it one of the five must-see African films.

He directed Bad Life in 2014. The film deals with a young man, Boda, who works for a drug dealer and is shot by the dealer, although Boda miraculously survives after being in a coma. Bad Life was nominated for the Guido Huysmans Prize and the Young African Filmmakers Prize at the Leuven International Short Film Festival, and it received the award for best film as well as the prize for best sound at FESTICAB.

Maronko has an interest in rebel groups and their effect upon society, having worked as a videographer for the International Business Times.

== Partial filmography ==
- 2011 : Pourquoi moi?
- 2014 : Bad Life
