= Consolate Sipérius =

Burundi born Belgian-French actress (born 1989)

- Born: Consolate Sipérius; 20 March 1989 (age 37); Burundi
- Occupation: Actress
- Years active: 2012–present

Consolate Sipérius (born 20 March 1989), is a Burundian-Belgian actress particularly active in French cinema and theatre.

== Personal life ==
Sipérius was born on 20 March 1989 in Burundi.

== Career ==
In 2012, she graduated from the Royal Conservatory of Mons with an Arts degree. She performed in many theatre plays such as, Le Philosophe et le Perroquet, Voici Électre!, Flash Flow IV, Éclipse totale, Georges Dandin in Afrika, Crever d'amore, Mitleid: Die Geschichte des Maschinengewehrs and The Children of the Sun under many renowned Belgian and European directors, such as: Dolorès Oscari, Sue Blackwell, Anne Thuot, Céline Delbecq, Guy Theunissen, Brigitte Bailleux, Frédéric Dussenne, Milo Rau and Christophe Sermet.

For her role in the play Éclipse totale, she was nominated for the Critics' Prize in the Female Hope category in 2014. In 2016, she made her film debut with the feature La Route d'Istambul directed by Rachid Bouchareb. In 2018, she acted in the film Family. In September 2021, she acted in the play Patricia by Geneviève Damas, adapted and directed by Frédéric Dussenne.
