= Radio Isanganiro =

Radio station in Burundi

Coordinates: 3.3818°S 29.3662°E

Radio Isanganiro (English: Radio Meetingpoint) is a private radio station in Burundi which aims to support conflict resolution between Hutus and Tutsis. It broadcasts in Kirundi, Swahili and French.

== History ==
Radio Isanganiro was founded in 2002 by Burundi journalists from various ethnic groups, with the stated aim of providing objectivity through dual-perspective reporting, avoiding sensationalism. As well as Burundi, the programs can also be received in neighboring countries and via internet streaming. As well as radio programs, Isanganiro provides training and maintains a databank on the sub-region.

The talk show Inyanduruko (English: The roots of evil) received the Radio for Peace Building prize in 2006. In 2007, the station received a Prince Claus Award from the Netherlands.
