= Kidum Kibido =

Burundian artist (born 1974)

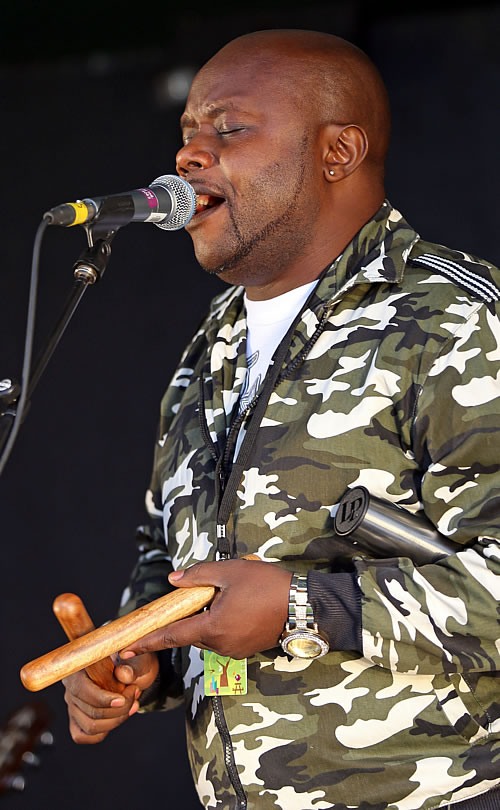

Background information
- Born: Jean-Pierre Nimbona; 28 October 1974 (age 51); Bujumbura, Kinama, Burundi
- Genres: Afro-Zouk
- Occupations: Singer-songwriter, musician
- Instruments: Vocals, guitar, percussions
- Years active: 2001–present
- Label: No Label (current)
- Website: therealkidum.com

Jean-Pierre "Kidum" Nimbona (born 28 October 1974) is a Burundian musical artist. He was named Best Male Artist of East Africa at the 2012 Kora Awards. He was named as an Ambassador for Peace, a position that helps to foster hope and reconciliation in East Africa.

== Early life ==
Kidum, whose nickname was given to him by his mother and literally means a 20-liter jug, admits he was a very big baby. At age 10, his musical inspirations grew when he started playing the drums. Kidum formed a band in the years that followed and played all over Burundi. In 1995, he fled the political instability of his native land for Nairobi, Kenya, where he continued his musical career.

== Musical career ==
Once in Kenya, it took Kidum 4 years to start writing his own songs. In 1999, Kidum recorded "Yaramenje", his first song. As quoted in an interview with Jim Lenskold and published in the American Media Wire Service: "I decided to go to a small studio, in a container actually...". The song went on to capture the attention of then president Daniel arap Moi, who recognised its potential to unite Burundi. Although his earlier songs were recorded in the Kirundi language - he progressed to singing in Kiswahili where his spiritual and philosophical compositions became accessible to a wider audience. He then added French, English and Spanish to his repertoire. His secular but spiritual songs range from rocking zouk to acoustic classics.

Kidum has been well received by Canadians, who have been inviting him to perform year after year. In August 2014, he was invited to play the Edmonton Folk Music Festival in the City of Edmonton, province of Alberta in Canada.

With his current BodaBoda Band, (translated as Crossing Borders) Kidum performs throughout Africa, the Middle East, Canada and soon in Europe, USA and many other places. His music has received positive reviews.

== Discography ==
=== Album ===
- Yaramenje (2001)
- Shamba (2003)
- Ishano (2006)
- Haturudi Nyuma (2010)
- Hali Na Mali (2012)

Kidum’s first album, Yaramenje was released in 2001. In 2001, Kidum was invited by Pierre Buyoya, Burundi's former President, to perform in a peace concert. In 2002, Kidum performed in another peace rally in 2002 in Burundi. This followed with the Shamba album, released in 2003. The 2006, the Ishano album portrays Kidum’s vocal talent with the rocking zouk Kichuna. With the 2010 release of Haturudi Nyuma, Kidum was granted The Kora Award (the African Grammy equivalent) for his songs Mapenzi, Nitafanya and Haturudi Nyauma. In 2012, Kidum recorded the popular Hali Na Mali album which included the singles Mulika Mwizi, Kimbia, Enjoy and Hali Na Mali.

== Awards ==
- 2011 Pearl of Africa Music Awards
- 2012 Kora Award. Best Male Artist of East Africa
- 2015 ISC’S World Music Award
- 2017 Buja Music Awards
