= Tonight (Kim Hyun-joong song) =

- Jacket A, Limited Edition

Single by Kim Hyun-joong
- Released: June 5, 2013
- Genre: J-pop, Pop rock
- Label: Delicious Deli Records; Universal Music Japan
- Songwriters: Sean Alexander, Todd Joseph Slingsby, Michael "Michaelangelo" Snyder
- Producer: Steven Lee

Kim Hyun-joong singles chronology
"Heat" (2012)	"Tonight" (2013)	"Hot Sun" (2014)

Tonight is Kim Hyun-joong's third Japanese single. There are five available versions of this single which has five completely different image concepts for each of the single covers. Each version includes different limited editions that may include a DVD with the music video to the three new songs.

== Reception ==
On the first day of its release, Tonight single came up to second place right away with 101,818 copies sold, and taking the number two spot by the end of the week. The album received Gold certificate for selling more than 100,000 copies and has recently been certified platinum with 250,000 copies sold worldwide.

== Jackets A-D (Limited Editions) and E (Normal Edition) ==
CD
No.	Title	Music	Arrangement	Length
1.	"Tonight"	Sean Alexander, Todd Joseph Slingsby, Glen Choi	Sean Alexander	3:05
2.	"Cappuccino"	Steven Lee (music producer), Andreas Oberg, Jimmy Richard, Fredrik Hult		3:40
3.	"君だけを消せなくて"
4.	"Tonight (Instrumental)"
5.	"Cappuccino (Instrumental)"
6.	"君だけを消せなくて (Instrumental)"

Jacket A (Ltd. Ed.): Bonus DVD
No.	Title	Length
1.	"Tonight MV"

Jacket B (Ltd. Ed.): Bonus DVD
No.	Title	Length
1.	"Cappucino MV"

Jacket C (Ltd. Ed.): Bonus DVD
No.	Title	Length
1.	"君だけを消せなくて MV"

== Music videos ==
- "Tonight"
- "Cappuccino"
- "君だけを消せなくて"

== Release history ==
Country	Date	Label	Format
Japan	June 5, 2013	Delicious Deli Records	CD (Normal Edition)
Japan	June 5, 2013	Delicious Deli Records	CD+DVD (Limited Edition A)
Japan	June 5, 2013	Delicious Deli Records	CD+DVD (Limited Edition B)
Japan	June 5, 2013	Delicious Deli Records	CD+DVD (Limited Edition C)
Japan	June 5, 2013	Delicious Deli Records	CD (Limited Edition D)

== Charts ==
Chart	Country	Period	Peak
Oricon Daily Single Chart	Japan	June 5, 2013	2
Oricon Weekly Single Chart	Japan	June 3–9, 2013	2
Oricon Monthly Single Chart	Japan	June 2013	6
Oricon Yearly Single Chart	Japan	2013	58
