= Kim Hyun-joong =

South Korean singer and actor (born 1986)

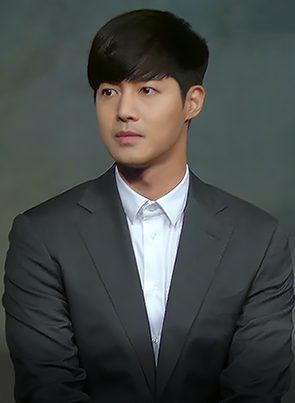
- Kim in 2018
- Born: June 6, 1986 (age 40); Seoul, South Korea
- Education: Kyonggi University; Chungwoon University; Hanyang Technical High School
- Occupations: Actor; dancer; model; singer; songwriter
- Years active: 2004–present
- Agent: Henecia Corporation
- Spouse: Unknown (m. 2022)
- Children: 2
- Musical career
- Genres: K-pop; J-pop
- Instruments: Vocals; Drums; Bass; Guitar; Piano
- Years active: 2005–present
- Label: Henecia Music
- Member of: SS501; Gemini Band; Five O One
- Website: www.hyun-joong.com

Signature
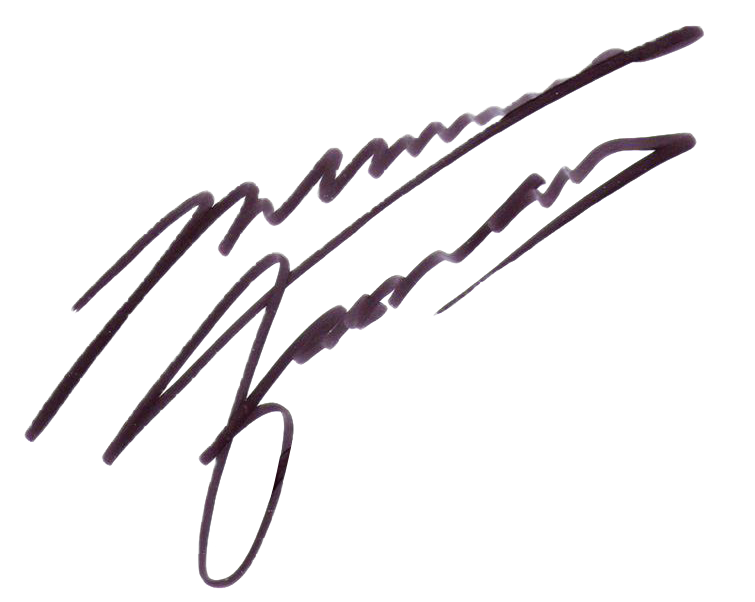

Kim Hyun-joong (Korean: 김현중; born June 6, 1986) is a South Korean actor, singer and songwriter. He is leader of the boy band SS501 and played roles in the Korean dramas Boys Over Flowers (2009) and Playful Kiss (2010). After debuting with SS501 in 2005, Kim released his first Korean solo album, Break Down, in 2011, and his first Japanese solo album, Unlimited, in 2012. Due to his commercial success, Kim is considered one of South Korea's biggest hallyu stars of the early 2010s.

== Early life and education ==
Kim was born on June 6, 1986, in Seoul. He described himself as a studious child, but he dropped out of high school to pursue a career in music. He later passed his high school exams and enrolled in Kyonggi University. After dropping out of university to focus on work, Kim enrolled in Chungwoon University in 2011 to study stage production management.

== Career ==
=== 2005–2008: Career beginnings ===
Kim made his debut as a member of SS501 on June 23, 2005, with the group's first EP, Warning, released by DSP Media. Their second EP, Snow Prince was released in late 2005, five months after their debut. The group quickly gained popularity, winning multiple new artist awards in 2005 and 2006. The following year, in 2007, SS501 debuted in Japan with the single "Kokoro," which reached number five on the Oricon charts. In January 2008, the group received a Newcomer Award at the Japan Gold Disc Award ceremony, making them one of only a few South Korean artists to win this award.

In 2008, Kim joined the cast of the reality variety show We Got Married, where he was paired with singer Hwangbo. Dubbed the "Lettuce Couple," the pair was popular among viewers and won the Best Couple Award at the 2008 MBC Entertainment Awards. They left the show at the end of 2008 to focus on other projects.

=== 2008–2010: Career breakthrough and success ===
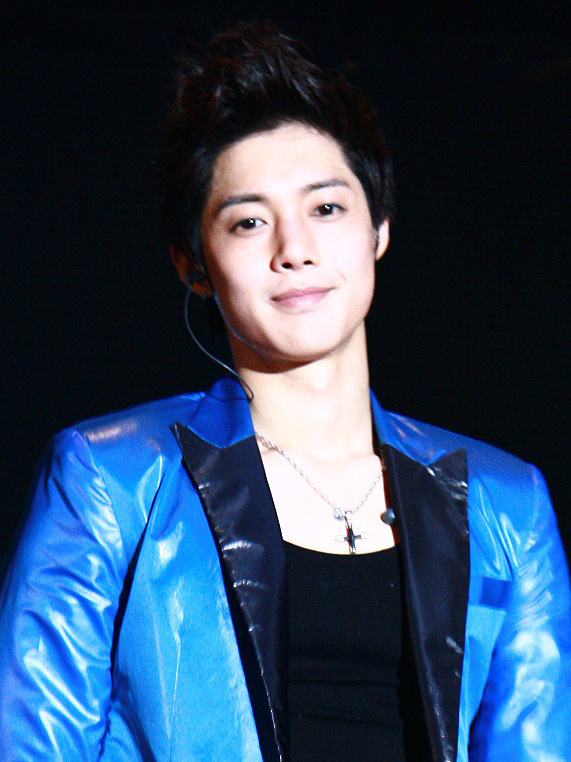
Kim performing in Hong Kong with SS501 in 2009

In 2008, Kim was cast in his first lead-acting role in the Korean drama Boys Over Flowers. The show was extremely popular in South Korea and other Asian countries, and Kim won the Most Popular Actor Award at the 2009 Seoul International Drama Awards and the Most Popular Actor for Television Award at the 2009 Baeksang Arts Awards.

Kim and his Boys Over Flowers costars also sparked a trend among South Korean men who copied their "flower boy" style. Tony Moly, a cosmetics brand for which Kim had been a spokesmodel since 2006, saw a 30 percent sales increase in 2009, which the company attributed to the popularity of the show. Kim's contract with Tony Moly ended in 2010, and he became the spokesmodel for another cosmetics brand, The Face Shop, later that year.

Following the success of Boys Over Flowers, Kim played his second lead role in a drama, in 2010's Playful Kiss, a Korean adaptation of the Japanese shōjo manga, Itazura na Kiss. The show flopped on South Korean television, but was an international hit on foreign television and on online streaming platforms, helping solidify Kim's popularity as a Hallyu star.

At the end of 2010, Kim was chosen to represent South Korea at the opening of the 2010 Asian Games in Guangzhou, where he performed the anthem "Sunshine Again" with singers from Chinese-speaking countries.

=== 2011: Solo debut, chart success and first Japanese tour ===
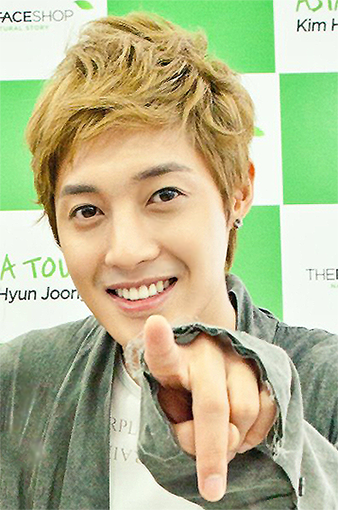
Kim at the promotion event of The Face Shop in 2011

Kim released his solo debut, the EP Break Down, on June 7, 2011. More than 70,000 pre-ordered copies of the album were sold in just 10 days. The EP was the ninth best-selling album of 2011 on South Korea's Gaon Album Chart, and was certified platinum in Taiwan. Later that year, Kim released his second album Lucky. The EP debuted at number five on Billboard's World Chart, and was the 10th best-selling album of the year in South Korea with over 100,000 copies sold.

Following up on the success of a concert he performed in Japan in June, Kim signed a deal with Universal Music Japan in November. Shortly after that, he went on a tour of Japan, performing in seven cities.

At the end of the year, Kim won the award for Best Male Artist at the 2011 Mnet Asian Music Awards held in Singapore. On December 15, Kim released a digital single titled "Marry Me".

=== 2012: Japanese debut and overseas promotions ===
On January 25, 2012, Kim released his first Japanese single album, "Kiss Kiss / Lucky Guy," which was certified gold in Japan. In May, his First Impact concert DVD sold 16,000 copies in its first week of release, taking the number one spot on the Oricon DVD Chart. This was the first time a South Korean artist had taken the number one spot, and a second time a foreign artist had taken the number one spot on the chart. In March 2012, Kim was appointed the honorary ambassador for United Nations' Korean Campaign on Contributions to Social Welfare.

Kim released his second Japanese single album "Heat" on July 4. The album was Japan's third best-selling album in July, selling 196,850 copies, which earned Kim his second consecutive gold certification. The following month, in August, Kim won Best Asian Artist at the 2012 Asia Song Festival. On December 12, Kim released Unlimited, his first full-length Japanese album, which included Japanese versions of "Break Down" and "Lucky Guy". It topped the Oricon Daily Chart and reached number 3 on the Weekly Chart. Madame Tussauds unveiled a wax figure of Kim in December 2018.

=== 2013–2014: Barefooted Friends, Japanese concerts and Inspiring Generation ===
On January 6, 2013, Kim kicked off a Japanese tour called Unlimited at the World Memorial Hall in Kobe, where he performed with a live band. Later that month, he performed alongside other K-pop artists in Brazil for the 2013 FEEL KOREA event, marking his first performance in South America.

On March 2, Kim performed at the U-Express Live 2013 at the Makuhari Messe in Japan with artists including Ringo Starr & His All-Starr Band, Far East Movement, Naoto Inti Raymi and Kara. That same month, Kim received the Creator's Factory Best Actor Award for the music video, "Lucky Guy," at the 5th Okinawa Music Festival.

On April 21, he began appearing on the South Korean variety show Barefooted Friends. Despite the show, Kim released his third Japanese single "Tonight" on June 5. Once again, his single topped the Oricon Daily Chart, and took the number two spot by the end of the week. The album received gold certification for selling more than one million copies. He released his third Korean EP, Round 3, on July 22.

At the end of the month, Kim left Barefooted Friends to film a new drama. After playing pretty boys in his first two dramas, Kim played a tougher role in the drama Inspiring Generation, which began airing in January 2014.

That July, he released his fourth Japanese single, "Hot Sun", which topped the Oricon weekly charts, making him the first foreign male solo artist to top the chart twice. At the end of June, he began a world tour that included stops in Taiwan, China, Japan, Thailand, Mexico, and Peru. The following month, in July, Kim released his fourth Korean EP, Timing.

=== 2015–2016: Japanese activities and military enlistment ===
Kim released his second Japanese studio album, Imademo, on February 11, 2015. The album entered the Oricon daily charts at number two and remained at that spot for 10 days.

Kim enlisted in the army for South Korea's mandatory military service in May 2015. After completing five weeks of basic training at Gyeonggi-do 30th Recruit Training Squadron he was stationed as a border patrol in the Korean Demilitarized Zone. While he was in the military, The Best of Kim Hyun Joong, a Japanese greatest hits album celebrating his 10 years in music industry, was released. It entered the Oricon daily charts at number one. Kim was discharged from military service in February 2017 after serving for 21 months.

=== 2017–present: Tours and Korean-Japanese album ===
In July 2017, Kim released his first album since leaving the military, the Japanese single album, re:wind. The album reached the number one spot on the Oricon album chart. Following its release, Kim went on Innercore 16-city Japanese tour. In November, he released the EP Haze, his first Korean album in three years.

Kim Hyun Joong's 2018 World Tour 'HAZE' commenced on December 2, 2017. He performed in Bolivia, Chile, Mexico, South America, Japan, Thailand and Macau and the tour concluded in 2018. On June 6, he released Take My Hand, the first Album released from his own record Label Henecia Music. On September 26, he then released an album entitled Wait For Me. From September 27 to November 5, Kim held his Take My Hand Japan Tour. Later in the year, it was confirmed he would be making his small-screen comeback in the fantasy drama When Time Stopped. The drama ran from October 24 to November 29, 2018. He released a single, "Just for My Love", as the sixth part of the original Soundtrack for the drama.

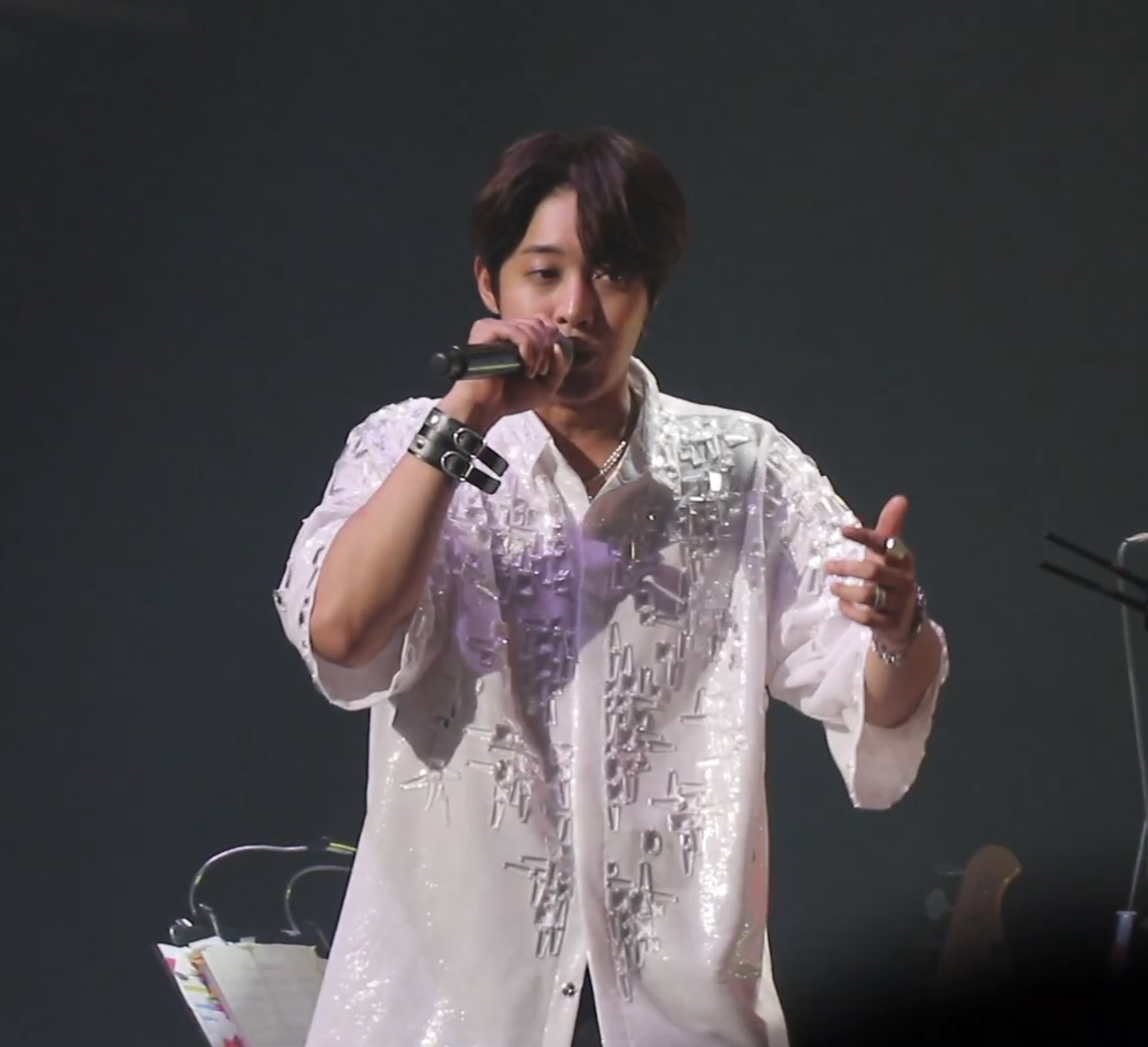
Kim performing during his "BIORHYTHM" world tour in Seoul

On February 4, 2019, he released a new album entitled New Way with the lead single "Why". On August 21, he released a Korean EP entitled SALT and on September 11, he released a Japanese EP entitled "THIS IS LOVE" which debuted at number one on the Oricon Weekly Rock Singles Chart and number two on Oricon year-end Indie Chart. On August 21, he embarked on a World Tour titled BIO-RHYTHM which ended on January 25, 2020. The tour took place in Japan, South Korea, Macau, Mexico, Bolivia, Peru and the Philippines.

On February 5, 2020, he released a full-length Japanese album titled The Moon, The Sun and Your Song which debuted at number three on the Oricon Daily Albums Chart and Number 4 on the Oricon Weekly Albums Chart. He also embarked on a two-month (February and March) Japan tour of the same name. On February 21, he appeared in the cover of the Korean Wave Japanese Magazine Hanryu Pia for the fourth time.

On April 14, 2020, it was announced that Kim has decided not to renew his contract with KeyEast. A representative from KeyEast Stated "Recently, Kim Hyun-joong's exclusive contract expired. Rather than renew, we mutually decided to support each other's futures." They continued, "Kim Hyun-joong's album activities will continue through his personal label, which he established last year."

On October 17, 2020, Kim held his first online concert, "A Bell of Blessing" and on October 19, 2020, he released his second full Korean album, a limited edition album titled "A Bell Of Blessing" which debuted at 14 on the Gaon Weekly Albums Chart. The title track of the album and its music video features vocals and appearances from Kim's fans all over the world.

On August 12, 2022, Kim returned with the first set of songs from his 3rd full Korean album, 'MY SUN' which he said would be released in 3 sets of 4 songs each. On August 18, 2022, he released the Japanese singles "Song for a Dreamer" and "Super Fire" as insert songs for the Japanese movie The Violence Action. The single debuted at number one on the Oricon weekly rock singles and Oricon weekly indie singles rankings, and number 18 on Billboard Japan singles chart.

== Personal life ==
=== Relationships ===
Kim's first son with his ex-girlfriend was born in 2015. During a concert on February 27, 2022, Kim announced his marriage with his non-celebrity girlfriend. Later, Kim's agency confirmed the news. According to his agency, they proceeded their marriage without holding a wedding ceremony. On July 21, 2022, it was confirmed by the agency that Kim's wife was pregnant. His second son was born on July 29, 2022.

== Controversies ==
=== Assault charges ===
In August 2014, Kim's girlfriend, identified only by her surname Choi, filed assault charges against Kim, claiming that he repeatedly beat her, causing bruises and broken ribs. Kim denied the charges, saying he had injured Choi only once and that it was an accident that occurred while he was practicing martial arts. Choi dropped some of the charges against Kim in September after he apologized to her. However, Kim was later fined 5 million KRW for injuring Choi, with prosecutors in the case saying, "While Kim claimed that he had no intention of hurting her, the damage from the attack was clear." This was later rescinded in 2016 when the Republic of Korea's army and civil courts acquitted Kim of these charges due to evidence that came to light. Text messages between Choi, her mother and friends, statements by the director of Dispatch (the tabloid to which Choi provided her evidence) and statements given by the hospitals visited by Choi led the prosecution to state that there was "little to no credibility behind the former girlfriend's allegations that she had to receive a six-week medical treatment for her fractured ribs". Hospital records also showed that she was not pregnant at the time she visited to get treatment for the injuries to her ribs.

On November 12, 2020, the Supreme Court of Korea ordered "A" to pay Kim Hyun Joong 100 million won (approximately $89,700) in damages, upholding the verdict from the first and second trials in which they stated, "There is no evidence that 'A' suffered a miscarriage due to abuse, or that he had pressured her to have an abortion. As a celebrity, Kim Hyun Joong's public image has suffered greatly and his reputation has been damaged."

=== Paternity case ===
In February 2015, a magazine reported that Kim and Choi had reunited and that Choi was pregnant. Kim stated via a press release that he had not seen Choi since she told him that she was pregnant in January, and could not confirm if he was the father since she had not been in touch. His agency indicated that he would take full responsibility if he was found to be the father of the child.

In December 2015, a paternity test revealed that Kim was the father of a baby that Choi had given birth to in September of that year.

=== Criminal case ===
In May 2015, Choi filed a lawsuit against Kim for 1.48 million USD for mental distress caused by her relationship with him, and claimed that his abuse had caused her to miscarry a previous pregnancy in 2014. Kim later filed and won a 100 million KRW counter-suit against Choi for defamation, with the court ruling that there was circumstantial evidence that she was not pregnant in 2014. Her lawsuit was dismissed, and she appealed the decision.

Prosecutors filed criminal charges against Kim's ex-girlfriend, Choi, for attempted fraud and defamation in January 2017. In February 2018, Choi was fined 5 million KRW for attempted fraud.

In November 2020, the 3rd Criminal Division of the Supreme Court (Judge Lee Dong-won, Chief Justice) confirmed a court trial that sentenced Choi to a fine of 5 million won on charges of attempted fraud and defamation by publication. Choi was found to have filed a civil lawsuit while knowing that her allegation that Kim had caused her damage, such as forced abortion, was false. In addition, she was also charged with falsifying evidence related to civil lawsuits, such as deleting some of the contents of KakaoTalk's conversation, and defaming Kim's reputation, including providing reporters with false evidence.

=== Drunk driving ===
In March 2017, Kim was charged with drunk driving after police found him asleep in his car at a traffic light in Seoul. His driver's license was suspended and he was eventually fined two million KRW.

== Philanthropy ==
Following the Fukushima Daiichi nuclear disaster in March 2011, Kim donated 100 million KRW to earthquake relief efforts in Japan. Later that year, he donated an addition 50 million KRW to earthquake relief efforts, as well as 50 million KRW to the Korean Red Cross, and 50 million KRW to a South Korean organization that gives coal briquettes to people in need. In 2012, he donated proceeds from his debut solo concert to an orphanage in Fukushima Prefecture.

Kim has also donated tens of millions of won to the Kim Hyun-joong Scholarship, which was established by a 15 million KRW donation from his fan club in 2010. In 2013, Kim donated 100 million KRW to the One Foundation for the victims of the Lushan earthquake in China. In 2019, during his BIO-RHYTHM World Tour in Thailand, he donated 9.7 million KRW to support the tuition fees for the students from Sumakee Learning Center, Mae Sot District, Tak Province.

== Discography ==
Korean

- Break Down (2011)
- Lucky (2011)
- Round 3 (2013)
- Timing (2014)
- Haze (2017)
- New Way (2019)
- Salt (2019)
- A Bell of Blessing (2020)
- My Sun (2022)

Japanese

- Unlimited (2012)
- Imademo (2015)
- Re:wind (2017)
- Take My Hand (2018)
- Wait for Me (2018)
- This Is Love (2019)
- Moon, Sun and Your Song (2020)

== Concert tours ==
- First Japan Tour (2011)
- Unlimited Japan Tour (2013)
- Phantasm World Tour (2014)
- Gemini Japan Tour (2015)
- Inner Core Japan tour (2017)
- Haze World Tour (2018)
- Japan Take My Hand Tour (2018)
- New Way Concert Tour (2019)
- Bio-Rhythm World Tour (2019)
- Moon, Sun and Your Song Japan Tour (2020)
- A Bell of Blessing Distance Concert (2020)
- Prism Time Online Monthly Concert (May to November 2021)
- The End of a Dream World Tour (2022–2023)

== Filmography ==
=== Film ===
Year	Title	Role	Ref.
2006	Pi's Story (Korean version)	Bap; Max	
2021	Indian Pink	Kang Dong-seok	

=== Television series ===
Year	Title	Role	Ref.
2004	Nonstop 5	Kim Hyun-joong	(Cameo)
2005	Can We Refill the Love?	William HJ	
2007	Hotelier	SS501 member	(Cameo)
2008	Spotlight	SS501 member	(Ep. 1)
2009	Boys Over Flowers	Yoon Ji-hoo	
2010	Playful Kiss	Baek Seung-jo	
2011	Dream High	Kim Hyun-joong (Cameo)	
2014	Inspiring Generation	Shin Jung-tae	
2018	When Time Stopped	Moon Joon-woo	
2024	Time Without Her	Cha Eun-tae	

=== Variety shows ===
Year	Title	Notes	Ref.
2008	We Got Married (season 1)	Episodes 9–38 (with Hwangbo)	
2012	K-Pop Star Captivating the World	Documentary series	
2013	Barefooted Friends	Episodes 1–29	

=== Voice acting ===
Year	Title	Character	Ref.
2006	Doraemon	Santa Claus / Father Nobita	
2010	Cheburashka	(voice)	
2013	Moshi Monsters	Katsuma	
2018	Doraemon the Movie: Nobita's Treasure Island	Flock / Santa Claus	
2019	Eiga Doraemon: Nobita no getsumen tansaki	Luca	

== Awards and nominations ==
Awards and achievements
Preceded by Taeyang	13th Mnet Asian Music Awards – Best Male Solo Artist; 2011	Succeeded by G-Dragon
