= Inspiring Generation =

2014 South Korean television series

- Also known as: Age of Feeling; Grateful Generation; Generation of Gratitude; Generation of Youth
- Hangul: 감격시대
- Hanja: 感激時代
- RR: Gamgyeok sidae
- MR: Kamgyŏk sidae
- Genre: Period drama Action; Drama; Romance
- Written by: Chae Seung-dae
- Directed by: Kim Jung-gyu; Ahn Joon-yong
- Starring: Kim Hyun-joong; Im Soo-hyang; Jin Se-yeon
- Country of origin: South Korea
- Original language: Korean
- No. of episodes: 24

Production
- Executive producer: Jung Hae-ryong
- Producer: Choi Ji-young
- Production location: Korea
- Running time: Wednesdays and Thursdays at 21:55 (KST)
- Production company: Raymmo

Original release
- Network: KBS2
- Release: January 15 – April 3, 2014

Inspiring Generation (Korean: 감격시대) is a 2014 South Korean television series starring Kim Hyun-joong, Im Soo-hyang and Jin Se-yeon. It aired on KBS2 from 15 January to 3 April 2014 on Wednesdays and Thursdays at 21:55 for 24 episodes.

Based on the manhwa by Bang Hak-gi (published daily by Sports Seoul from June 1985 to June 1988), the drama series had a budget of US$14 million and its story depicts the loves, friendships and patriotism of young Korean independence fighters in 1930s Shanghai.

== Plot ==
A story of violence, love and friendship that travels between Korea, China and Japan in the 1930s.

Shin Jung-tae (Kim Hyun-joong) loses his father at the age of 15 when a Japanese soldier shoots him during the Japanese occupation of Shanghai in the 1930s. But instead of finding justice, Jung-tae is accused of his own father's death. Jung-tae finds justice only by using his fists in the back alleys of Shanghai, growing up to become the best fighter on the continent.

== Cast ==
=== Main characters ===
- Kim Hyun-joong as Shin Jung-tae
  - Kwak Dong-yeon as young Jung-tae
- Im Soo-hyang as Lady Gaya Deguchi
  - Joo Da-young as young Gaya
- Jin Se-yeon as Yoon Ok-ryun
  - Ji Woo as young Ok-ryun

=== Supporting characters ===
- Kim Jae-wook as Kim Soo-ok
- Kim Kap-soo as Toyama Denkai
- Choi Jae-sung as Shin Young-chul
- Son Byong-ho as Choi Soo-ri
- Shin Seung-hwan as Jjang-ddol
  - Kim Dong-hee as young Jjang-ddol
- Kim Ga-eun as So-so
- Yoon Hyun-min as Toyama Aoki
- Choi Cheol-ho as Shinjo Deguchi
- Shin Eun-jung as Kim Sung-deok
- Lee Cho-hee as Mal-sook
  - Kim Min-ha as young Mal-sook
- Bae Noo-ri as Yang-yang
- Jo Dong-hyuk as Shinichi
- Choi Ji-ho as Aka
- Kwak Seung-nam as Genjo
- Yang Ik-june as Hwang Bong-shik
- Jo Dal-hwan as Poong-cha
- Ji Seung-hyun as Kang-gae
- Nuel as Kkab-sae
- Kim Sung-oh as Jung Jae-hwa
- Kim Seo-kyung as Mang-chi
- Yoo Tae-woong as Shin Ma-juk
- Seo Dong-gun as Cha Sang-ki
- Choi Il-hwa as Seol Doo-sung
- Jung Ho-bin as Wang Baek-san
- Song Jae-rim as Mo Il-hwa
- Lee Joon-seok as Won-pyung
- Lee Chul-min as Bul-gom
- Uhm Tae-goo as Do-goo
- Oh Soon-tae as Omogari
- Kim Roi-ha as Shin Ga-jum
- Park Chul-min as Old Man Fly
- Kim Se-jung as Shin Chung-ah
  - Lee Ji-woo as young Chung-ah
- Kim Byung-ki as Fortune teller
- So Hee-jung as Mok Po-daek, Mal-sook's mother
- Lee Sang-hee as Kim Cheom-ji
- Jung Jin as Yamamoto Hagesawa
- Im Hyung-joon as Koichi
- Jo Ha-seok as Sasaki
- Im Se-hwan as Tamada
- Moon Hee-kyung as Nun director
- Hwang Chae-won as Ran-ran
- Kim Yoon-hee as Ryoko Deguchi
- Yeo Ho-min as Ma Dang-ga
- Lee Hae-in as Sun Woo-jin
- Han Je-in as Dan-shim
- Kim Jae-kyung as Meiling
- Tae Hang-ho as Moon-bok

== Original soundtrack ==
Inspiring Generation OST

Soundtrack album by Various artists
- Recorded: 2014
- Genre: Soundtrack
- Languages: Korean; English
- Labels: Loen Entertainment; KIWI Music

=== Part 1 ===
Released on January 29, 2014
No.	Title	Artist	Length
1.	"Destiny" (운명)	Im Jae-bum	4:04
2.	"Destiny" (Inst.)		4:04
Total length:			8:08

=== Part 2 ===
Released on February 12, 2014
No.	Title	Artist	Length
1.	"Bruise" (멍)	Kim Gun-mo	3:57
2.	"Bruise" (Inst.)		3:57
Total length:			7:14

=== Part 3 ===
Released on February 14, 2014
No.	Title	Artist	Length
1.	"Good day to die" (죽기좋은날)	J2M	3:40
2.	"The Road"	Rhosy	3:31
Total length:			7:01

=== Part 4 ===
Released on March 13, 2014
No.	Title	Artist	Length
1.	"Like a flame" (불꽇처럼)	I. D.	3:34
2.	"Like a flame" (Inst.)		3:34
Total length:			6:58

=== Part 5 ===
Released on March 20, 2014
No.	Title	Artist	Length
1.	"The Light" (빚)	Na Yoon Kwon	4:22
2.	"The Light" (Inst.)		4:22
Total length:			8:44

=== Part 6 ===
Released on March 27, 2014
No.	Title	Artist	Length
1.	"Until that day, Goodbye" (그날까지안녕)	Zia	4:08
2.	"Until that day, Goodbye" (Inst.)		4:08
Total length:			8:16

=== Part 7 ===
Released on April 2, 2014
No.	Title	Artist	Length
1.	"When today passes" (오늘이지나면)	Kim Hyun-joong	4:06
2.	"When today passes" (Inst.)		4:06
Total length:			8:12

== Ratings ==
Episode #	Original broadcast date	Average audience share			
Episode #	Original broadcast date	TNmS Ratings		AGB Nielsen	
Episode #	Original broadcast date	Nationwide	Seoul National Capital Area	Nationwide	Seoul National Capital Area
1	15 January 2014	7.9%	9.2%	7.8%	7.7%
2	16 January 2014	7.8%	9.2%	7.7%	7.7%
3	22 January 2014	8.9%	9.2%	9.6%	10.3%
4	23 January 2014	8.9%	8.3%	7.9%	8.4%
5	29 January 2014	7.7%	8.6%	7.0%	7.9%
6	30 January 2014	7.9%	8.7%	8.3%	8.8%
7	5 February 2014	7.0%	7.2%	8.4%	8.6%
8	6 February 2014	7.4%	9.3%	8.9%	9.4%
9	12 February 2014	8.8%	9.4%	10.0%	10.7%
10	13 February 2014	9.9%	11.6%	11.4%	12.8%
11	19 February 2014	8.8%	9.1%	10.3%	10.8%
12	20 February 2014	8.2%	9.8%	9.8%	10.2%
13	26 February 2014	8.7%	9.3%	9.3%	9.7%
14	27 February 2014	8.9%	10.3%	9.7%	10.1%
15	5 March 2014	10.0%	10.9%	12.0%	12.7%
16	6 March 2014	10.3%	11.6%	12.5%	13.3%
17	12 March 2014	10.7%	12.2%	12.2%	13.2%
18	13 March 2014	10.0%	11.4%	12.6%	13.2%
19	19 March 2014	9.2%	10.2%	11.0%	11.1%
20	20 March 2014	10.8%	12.4%	12.1%	12.8%
21	26 March 2014	10.0%	11.4%	11.6%	12.3%
22	27 March 2014	10.3%	10.9%	12.3%	13.6%
23	2 April 2014	9.8%	10.4%	11.1%	11.5%
24	3 April 2014	10.7%	11.6%	12.3%	13.5%
Average		9.0%	10.0%	10.2%	10.8%

== Awards and nominations ==
Year	Award	Category	Recipient	Result
2014	KBS Drama Awards	Excellence Award, Actor in a Mid-length Drama	Kim Hyun-joong	Nominated
2014	KBS Drama Awards	Excellence Award, Actress in a Mid-length Drama	Im Soo-hyang	Nominated
2014	KBS Drama Awards	Best New Actor	Yoon Hyun-min	Nominated
2014	KBS Drama Awards	Best Young Actor	Kwak Dong-yeon	Won

== International broadcast ==
While it aired in Korea, the drama was simultaneously available online (with subtitles in several languages) on Singapore-based video streaming website Viki.

It aired in Japan on cable channel DATV beginning 9 August 2014.

In aired in Indonesia on cable channel RTV beginning 16 August 2014.

In Thailand aired on PPTV HD beginning 20 March 2015.
