= Prince Hours =

2007 South Korean romantic comedy TV series

- Promotional poster
- Also known as: Goong S
- Hangul: 궁 S
- Hanja: 宮 S
- RR: Gung S
- MR: Kung S
- Genre: Comedy; Romance
- Written by: Lee Jae-soon; Do Young-myung
- Directed by: Hwang In-roi
- Starring: Seven; Heo Yi-jae; Kang Doo; Park Shin-hye
- Opening theme: "궁S" (Goong S) by Second Moon
- Ending theme: "Miracle (Happy Run Version)" by 황성제 (Hwang Seong Je)
- Country of origin: South Korea
- Original language: Korean
- No. of episodes: 20

Production
- Production company: Group Eight

Original release
- Network: Munhwa Broadcasting Corporation
- Release: January 10 – March 15, 2007

Related
- Princess Hours

Prince Hours (Korean: 궁S; RR: GungS; lit. 'Palace S') is a 2007 South Korean romantic comedy television series, starring Seven, Heo Yi-jae, Kang Doo and Park Shin-hye. It is a spin-off of the 2006 series Goong (also known as Princess Hours), both were directed by Hwang In-roi and produced by Group Eight. Goong S aired on MBC from January 10 to March 15, 2007, on Wednesdays and Thursdays at 21:55 for 20 episodes.

== Plot ==
The story set in a universe where Korea is a constitutional monarchy. The Empress regnant, (Myung Se-bin), already in her thirties, is still unmarried and without an heir, which prompts the imperial court to look for a suitable Crown Prince. They encounter Lee Hoo (Seven), the son of the empress' cousin, and brings him into the palace where he begins to learn the life of a royal. However, another competitor arrives at the court: Lee Joon (Kang Doo), the son of another cousin of the Empress. They compete for the title of Crown Prince via a trial of several tasks to determine the worthy future Emperor of the country.

== Cast and characters ==
- Seven as Kang Hoo/Lee Hoo

A prince raised as a commoner because his mother was thrown out of the palace shortly before his birth. After his mother's death, he was raised by one of the former Palace guards. The imperial family was unaware of his existence until he was taken into the succession line by the Empress. At the beginning, Lee Hoo seemed to be the least likely candidate to fill the spot of Crown Prince. He was rash, lacked focus and was seemingly selfish to most but as he struggled to learn of the life he was destined to live, he turned into a considerate, mature and responsible young man. He is also fair and has a great sense of right and wrong.

- Heo Yi-jae as Yang Soon-ae

Prince Lee Hoo's childhood friend and one of the few that still refer him as Kang Hoo (the name he was raised as). A sensible and kind-hearted young woman who works as a palace maid. She is in love with Lee Hoo, and is supportive of Lee Hoo during his journey to becoming a Crown Prince.

- Kang Doo as Lee Joon

Raised by nobility, Prince Lee Joon has his mind set to be the next Emperor of Korea. He was to be engaged to the Prime Minister's daughter Shin Sae-ryung and agreed to the arrangement, but later resented it as he fell for palace maid Yang Soon-ae. He later refused the throne after realizing the truth of his father's greed, and decided to pursue his dreams of becoming a musician.

- Park Shin-hye as Shin Sae-ryung

The daughter of the Prime Minister, who was raised to be a proper lady and groomed to be the next Empress of Korea. She had always followed her father's instructions after her mom left her for a life of simplicity. Though her only interest was to be the Empress, she eventually fell for Prince Lee Hoo. She eventually came to peace with her mother's decision, and remain friends with both Princes.

- Myung Se-bin as Queen Hwa-in

Korea's current reigning Empress. In public, she seems to be the most well-adjusted woman with high regards, but in truth, she has been concealing her feelings. She had been in love with a half-Korean, half-Austrian professor whom she met during her studies at Oxford University, but had to leave him and return to Korea to assume her role. She becomes conflicted when her former love, Alexander comes to Korea, when she is forced once again to choose between her love or people.

- Marc Andre Jourdan as Alexander

The Empress's love interest. He's half-Korean, half-Austrian, and though unable to speak fluent Korean, he is able to understand the language. He came to Korea, accepting a job offer at the Royal Academy and at the same time seeking for an answer for the choices the Empress had made. He later backed out, realizing that it would make the situation difficult for the Empress. He left Korea and later it was revealed that he also contributed to Yang Soon-ae's education fund.

- Oh Mi-hee as Empress Dowager

The mother of the current Empress, who is rather detached from the outside world from having lived in the palace for a very long time. She is unable to distinguish the difference between the latest technology. She is very fond of Lee Hoo. Though she supported Lee Hoo's father when he chose to marry a commoner, she strongly opposed Lee Hoo's relationship with Yang Soon-ae, for fear of history repeating itself.

=== Supporting cast ===
- Ha Jae-young as Grand Prince Hyosung, Hoo's father
- Chun Ho-jin as Grand Prince (Hyojang Daegong) Lee Gyeom, Joon's father
- Yoon Ye-hee as Jang Yoon-hee, Joon's mother
- Cha Hyun-jung as Min Shi-yeon, Joon's bodyguard
- Lee Hong-pyo as Min Young-hyun
- Jeon Hye-soo as Shi Jong-gwan
- Seo Song-hee as Ma Young-nam, Soon-ae's friend
- Seo Young-don as In-woo
- So Do-bi as Min-hyuk
- Lee Man-young as Kwak Nae-kwan
- Song Baek-kyung as Bulbam
- Ye Soo-jung as Court attendant Han
- Lee Ki-young as Go Sang-ki
- Lee Joo-hyun as Yoon-chul
- Lee Ho-jae as Jin Sin-sa
- Kim Hong-sik as Shin Jae-man, Sae-ryung's father
- Jeon Soo-hyun as court attendant Choi
- Kim Chang-sung as Jjooba
- Jung Hye-young as Hoo's mother (cameo)
- Cho Sung-hwan as Jjodaeng
- Hwang In-woo as Hwang Ka
- Moon Ga-young

== Reception ==
Although Princess Hours was a hit, Prince Hours failed to attract many viewers. Initial overnight ratings averaged around 10%, about half of the original's. Further in its run, the ratings decreased to 7-8%.

Despite the low ratings, Goong S was the most searched and rewatched drama online and ranked higher than its competition: KBS2's Dal-Ja's Spring and SBS's Surgeon Bong Dal Hee. The drama has also gained a wide variety of support from international fans in the U.S., Thailand, Malaysia, Brazil, Singapore, Philippines etc.

== Ratings ==
Date	Episode	Nationwide	Seoul
2007-01-10	1	15.3% (6th)	16.1% (6th)
2007-01-11	2	14.3% (10th)	14.3% (9th)
2007-01-12	3	12.3% (11th)	12.5% (11th)
2007-01-13	4	11.7% (13th)	11.9% (13th)
2007-01-14	5	10.2% (15th)	11.9% (16th)
2007-01-15	6	9.3% (19th)	8.7% (19th)
2007-01-16	7	9.0% (20th)	8.7% (20th)
2007-01-17	8	9.0%	9.1%
2007-01-18	9	6.5%	%
2007-01-19	10	5.9%	%
2007-01-20	11	6.8%	%
2007-01-21	12	6.4%	%
2007-01-22	13	5.2%	%
2007-01-23	14	5.9%	%
2007-01-24	15	4.8%	%
2007-01-25	16	5.3%	%
2007-01-26	17	4.9%	%
2007-01-27	18	4.7%	%
2007-01-28	19	4.2%	%
2007-01-29	20	4.6%	%
Average		7.8%	%

Source: TNS Media Korea

== International broadcast ==
Indonesia

- Channel: Indosiar
- Broadcast: September 13, 2007

Japan

- Channel: MNet Japan
- Broadcast: June 9, 2007
- Channel: BS Japan
- Broadcast: August 15, 2007

Malaysia

- Channel: 8TV
- Broadcast: March 26, 2008 – May 2, 2008

Philippines

- Channel: Studio 23
- Broadcast:2010

Singapore

- Channel: Channel U
- Broadcast: October 13, 2007 – December 8, 2007

Taiwan

- Channel: GTV
- Broadcast: July 4, 2007

Thailand

- Channel: Channel 7
- Broadcast: June 17, 2007 – August 12, 2007

Turkey

- Channel: TRT 1
- Broadcast: January 10, 2007 – March 15, 2007, January 29, 2009 – February 25, 2009

United States

- Channel: LA18
- Broadcast: February 21, 2007 – April 25, 2007

Vietnam

- Channel: HTV7
- Broadcast: August 8, 2007

Sri Lanka

- Channel/Streaming service: Iflix
