= Lee Ho-jae (actor) =

South Korean actor (born 1941)

- 이호재
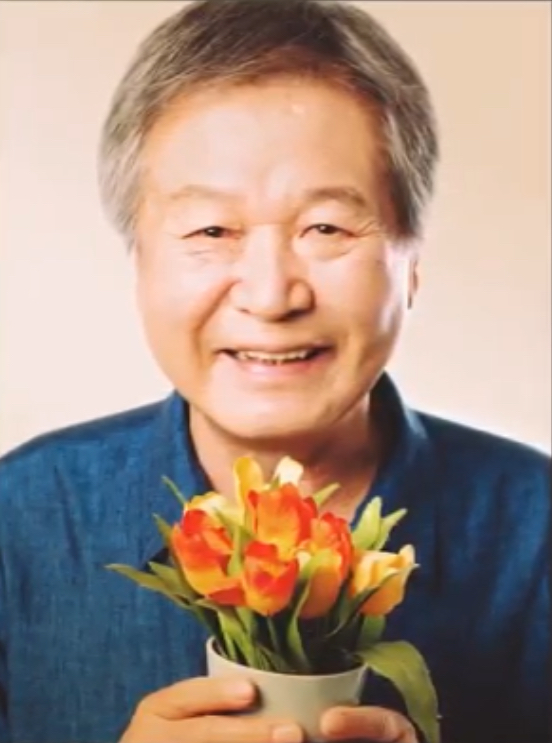
- Lee in 2017
- Born: May 2, 1941 (age 85); Seoul, South Korea
- Education: Whimoon High School; Seoul Institute of the Arts - Theater Department
- Occupation: Actor
- Years active: 1963–present
- Agent: Theater Company Cultizen
- Spouse: Choi Ho-won (m. 1973)
- Awards: Lee Hae-rang Theater Award
- Honours: Bogwan Order of Cultural Merit (2011)

Korean name
- Hangul: 이호재
- Hanja: 李豪宰
- RR: I Hojae
- MR: I Hojae

Lee Ho-jae (Korean: 이호재; born May 2, 1941) is a South Korean actor. Lee began his career on stage in 1963, in the play Of Mice and Men, and has appeared in numerous works of Korean theatre, film, and television.

In 1977, with his fellow actor Jeon Moo-song, Lee performed in play Crown Prince Hamyeol (an adaptation of Hamlet) at La MaMa in New York City, which marked the first time a Korean theatre troupe had traveled outside Korea.

Lee was the first actor to win the Lee Hae-rang Theater Award, one of the major theater awards in Korea. He has been praised as a master of speech for his restrained emotion acting. In 2011 Lee was awarded the Bogwan Order of Cultural Merit by South Korean government.

== Career ==
=== Early career ===
Lee was born in Seoul and grew up in the Jongno-dong neighborhood. He's the eldest of 6 siblings, 3 boys and 3 girls. His father had a big business in dyes and pigments. Lee didn't plan to be an actor. He was an ice hockey player at Whimoon High School in Seoul. In the spring of 1960, He was a freshman in Yonsei University's Department of Political Science and Diplomacy. Because of his good voice, a senior appointed Lee him to read the April 19 Revolution Manifesto in student protest, but that incident made Lee expelled from university. He was wandering for two years, then in autumn 1962, he decided to enter newly established Korean Theater Academy, founded by Dongnang Yoo Chi-jin (1905–1974) (Note: Seoul Institute of the Arts was established by Dongnang Arts Foundation. Dongnang Arts Foundation has its roots in the Korean Theater Research Institute founded by a scholar "Dongnang" Yoo Chi-jin in 1958. In 1958, Yoo Chi-jin founded the Korean Theater Research Institute. Dongnang also built the affiliated Drama Center (Namsan Arts Center) and Theater Library in 1962. In the same year, he also started the Korean Theater Academy, which has become what is today Department of Theater and Film of Seoul Institute of the Arts.) which was predecessor of today Department of Theater and Film of Seoul Institute of the Arts. Class of 1962 was the first batch from the academy. Lee's fellow classmate included Shin Gu, Jeon Moo-song, Ban Hyo-jeong (who did not graduate), and playwright Yoon Dae-seong.

In 1963, Lee made his stage debut as Lenny Small in John Steinbeck's Of Mice and Men at the Myeongdong National Theater. The production was produced by a theater company owned by his friend, Kim Bul-rae (currently a former professor at Hongik University). In exchange for free drinks at his mother's bar, Kim convinced Lee to join the play.

=== Career from 1964 to 1999 ===
After graduating in 1964, Lee and his fellow classmate Jeon Moo-song became members of the Dongnang Repertoire Theater Company. However, in 1966, he was called to serve in the military for 36 months. Lee fulfilled his mandatory military enlistment by participating in the Vietnam War and was discharged in 1969. After a brief stint working in another company, he returned to the theater company. While with the Dongnang Repertoire Theater Company, Lee worked on major plays by playwright Oh Taeseok, including his original works "Chobun" and "Tae" (lifecord), as well as the adaptation of Molière's Scapin the Schemer called "Sootduki Play" (1974).

In 1975, Lee with his fellow actor Jeon Moo-song and playwright Oh Taeseok joined National Theater Company of Korea (NTCK). His most memorable and notable work there was Henrik Ibsen's play Peer Gynt.

In 1977, Lee with Jeon Moo-song and Oh Taeseok, joined Dongnang Repertory Theater Company's World Tour Return Commemorative Performance. Dongrang Repertory theater company led by CEO Yoo Deok-hyung (president of Seoul Institute of the Arts at that time) toured the world for about three months from March 9 to May 30, 19777, sponsored by JoongAng Ilbo, Dongyang Broadcasting, and the American Headquarter of International Theatre Institute (ITI), co-hosted by the Rockefeller Foundation in the United States). This was first full-fledged overseas tour of a Korean theater. The repertoire of this world tour theater performance is "Tae (Life Cord)" and Crown Prince Hamyeol (directed by Ahn Min-su, an adaptation of Shakespeare's original Hamlet).

Dongnang Repertory Theater Company's World Tour Return Commemorative Performance was held as an opportunity to attend the "World Theater Month" commemorative event hosted by the American Headquarter of International Theatre Institute (ITI), which held in New York, US, from March 15. Following the performance at the commemorative event, the troupe toured around the U.S. in Dallas, Minneapolis, Los Angeles, and Hawaii, as well as in Paris, France and the Netherlands. Before leaving the country, the troupe performed a commemorative performance of Tae (Life Cord), written by Oh Tae-seok, directed by Ahn Min-soo), one of the tour works, at the annex of the Seoul Citizens Hall from February 22 to 24 (hosted by JoongAng Ilbo and Dongyang Broadcasting). They started the tour at La MaMa in New York City.

Lee also joined Dongnang Repertory Theater Company in invitation performance of Crown Prince Hamyeol in American Headquarter of International Theatre Institute (ITI) World Theater Day, from June 15 to 20, 1977 in Los Angeles, United States.

Lee recognized as one of notable actor in history of South Korea modern theatre in the 70s. Lee was nicknamed "The Eternal Watchman of the Theater World" because he stayed in the theatre even when his seniors and colleagues left for television dramas and movies. Lee wanted to be financially independent by only do plays, but due to circumstances after marriage with children, since 1980s he was forced to also do radio, television dramas and films.

After five years with NTCK, he decided to be a freelancer. In the 80s, he worked with different theater company such as company Sanwoolim, Seongjwa, and Hyundai Theater.

In 1994, Lee debuted on the musical stage in The stars love each other with meaning in the world. The musical written by an active psychiatrist, Kim Jong-il, depicts the devastated mental world of Jung Hoon, who suffers from mental illness, through various events that happen in a dream overnight which is a reminder of the importance of life. Directed by Song Mi-sook, this work was performed at the Hakjeon Small Theater from December 1, 1994, to Januari, 1995.

=== Career in 2000s ===
In 2005, Lee performed in the play "The Story of Two Knights Moving Around the World" by Betsuyaku Minoru, one of the leading playwrights in modern Japan. Additionally, in the same year, Lee and Jeon Moo-song reunited for the play "Dragon and Tiger Sangbak", directed by Oh Tae-seok. This project marked their first collaboration in eight years since "A Thousand Years of Beast" in 1997. It was also a special occasion as it marked exactly 30 years since the three of them had worked together to put on a performance at the Namsan Drama Center, where they had started their career.

Lee worked several times with playwright Lee Man-hee, his junior in at Whimoon High School in Seoul. One of their work together was play Let's Go Over the Hill (2007), a story of a love triangle between three friends at their sunset age. Lee also worked with National Theater Company's Oh Young-soo and Jeon Yang-ja. Directed by Lee Seong-sin, it was performed at the Hakjeon Blue Small Theater in Daehak-ro.

In 2010, Lee performed in the play Even if I deceive you (written by Lee Man-hee, directed by Ahn Kyung-mo to commemorates his 70th birthday.

In 2015, Lee joined project to celebrate the 110th anniversary of Dongnang Yoo Chi-jin, reenactment of The Han River Flows. The play performed at the Drama Center of Namsan Arts Center in Yejang-dong, Seoul. Oh Tae-seok, chair professor at Seoul Institute of the Arts, was the director and Dong-rang's son, Yoo Deok-hyeong, president of Seoul Institute of the Arts, will be the artistic director.

In 2017, four masters of the theater, met at the 2nd Neulpureun Theater Festival. (Note: This is an annual festival that honors the achievements of the senior actors and creator who contributed to the Korean theater industry every year. This event is hosted by the Korea Theater Association and sponsored by the Korean Culture and Arts Committee. 1st festival in 2016 was called Senior Theater Festival. From 2nd festival in 2016 onwards, the name changed into Neulpureun Theater Festival (literally translated as Never Blue, which means Evergreen)) Lee Ho-jae and fellow actor Oh Hyun-kyung represent actors, Director Kim Do-hoon and playwright Noh Kyung-shik represent creator. The masters have average age of 79 years old. In this festival Lee Ho-jae performed his play Let's Go Over the Hill. This was written by Lee Man-hee as tribute to him and the time of its premiere in 2007, it received a great response from the middle-aged audience with his warm and pleasant gaze toward the silver age and delicious lines. Directed by Choi Yong-hoon, the play performed at Daehangno Arts Theater from August 17 to 27, 2018.

In 2011, Lee was awarded the 2011 Order of Cultural Merit (Level 3) by the government.

Since 2018, Lee Ho-jae became one of member of Theater, Film and Dance Division of The National Academy of Arts. (Note: The National Academy of Arts, Republic of Korea Award, first held in 1955, is one of the most authoritative awards ceremonies for Korean writers and artists. Republic of Korea Award, first held in 1955, is one of the most authoritative awards ceremonies for Korean writers and artists group.)

In 2022, Lee performed on stage to commemorate the 60th acting anniversary. Lee Man-hee wrote a new play titled Jealousy dedicated to Lee Ho-jae. The play is centered on 'Wan-gyu' (Lee Ho-jae), who lives and runs a business alone in a plastic house office after divorce, and 'Chun-san' (Nam Myeong-ryeol), a friend. The drama depicts the romance of twilight with Sujeong (Nam Ki-ae), a local drugstore pharmacist. Directed by Choi Yong-hoon, the play performed from May 27 to June 5, 2022, at Hakjeon Blue, Daehangno, Seoul.

== Filmography ==
=== Film ===
List of Film(s)
Year	Title		Role
Year	English	Korean	Role
1992	The Woman Who Never Divorced	이혼하지 않은 여자	
1992	Hwa-Om-Kyung	화엄경	Beopun
1994	Taebaek Mountains	태백산맥	former director
1995	Rehearsal	리허설	Kim Myung-gun
1997	Father	아버지	Doctor Nam
1997	He Asked Me if I Know Zita	그는 나에게 지타를 아느냐고 물었다	Stranger
1999	End of the Century	세기말	Chun
2000	Libera Me	리베라 메	Lee In-ho
2002	Yesterday	예스터데이	Chief of Police
2003	Star	별	Noh doctor
2003	Run 2 U	런 투 유	Chairman Lee Doo-yong
2006	The Railroad	경의선	Min-soo's father
2008	Little Prince	어린왕자	Han Jeong-tae
2008	Love and War: The Twelfth Man	사랑과 전쟁: 열두 번째 남자	
2010	Man of Vendetta	파괴된 사나이	old gentleman
2015	The Priests	검은 사제들	the spirit buoy
2018	Default	국가부도의 날	YS

=== Television drama series ===
List of Television drama series
Year	Title		Role
Year	English	Korean	Role
1973	113 Investigation Headquarters	MBC 113 수사본부	various minor roles
1980	Song Buried in the Ground	TBC 땅에 묻은 노래	
1980	People of the Land	TBC 그땅의 사람들	
1980	Country Diary	MBC 전원일기	various minor roles
1981	1st Republic	제1공화국	Seo Sang-il
1981	Korea Fantasy Song	코리아 환상곡	
1983	Country	개국	Baegeuk-nyum
1983	Mama of Autumn Palace	추동궁 마마	Jeongdojeon
1984	The Independence Gate	독립문	Lee Sang-jae
1984	Guest History	객사	
1984	The Governor-General of Korea	조선총독부	Gojong in Joseon
1984	Missing You	그리워	
1985	Separate Song	이산별곡	
1986	Nirvana Festival	열반제	Chōyeongeosa
1987	A Broadcaster	어느 방송인	
1987	Ehwa	이화	Heungseon Daewongun
1987	Can't Go Country	갈 수 없는 나라	
1988	In Search of History	역사를 찾아서	
1988	Chosun White Porcelain Maria Award	조선백자 마리아상	
1989	Forest Does Not Sleep	숲은 잠들지 않는다	
1990	Night Train	밤기차	
1990	The Sinner We Love	우리가 사랑하는 죄인	
1991	Happiness Dictionary	행복어사전	Yoon Doo-myung
1991	Slime	미늘	
1993	The Third Republic	제3공화국	Choi Young-hee as Jung Il-Hyung
1995	Kim Gu	김구	Lee Dong-hwi Station
2000	Sound of Thunder	천둥소리	Seon-jo
2002	Friends	프렌즈	Ji-hoon's father
2004	I'm Sorry, I Love You	미안하다, 사랑한다	Min Hyun-seok
2006	Princess Hours	궁	Gongnae-gwan
2006	Just Run!	일단 뛰어	Noh Seok-jung
2007	Prince Hours	궁S	Jisinsa
2008	My Sweet Seoul	달콤한 나의 도시	Eun-soo's father
2008	Lawyer of Great Republic of Korea	대한민국 변호사	Choi Soo-soo
2008	Worlds Within	그들이 사는 세상	middle-aged actor
2008	The Return of Iljimae	돌아온 일지매	Iljimae's biological father
2009	Tamra, the Island	탐나는도다	Park Chul (Park Gyu's father)
2010	Flames of Desire	욕망의 불꽃	Yoon Sang-hoon
2011	Listen to My Heart	내 마음이 들리니?	Tae Seung-ho
2013	MBC Drama Festival: "Sunlight Noon Jung's Amazing Funeral"	MBC 드라마 페스티벌 – 햇빛 노인정의 기막힌 장례식	Choi Ong-sik
2014	Golden Cross	골든크로스	Kim Jae-gap
2015	Oh! My Grandma	오!할매	Ki-chan
2015	The Scholar Who Walks the Night	밤을 걷는 선비	Mun-jo
2015	Mom	엄마	Cho Jang
2016	Squad 38	38 사기동대	Choi Chul-woo
2016	The Doctors	닥터스	Hong Du-sik
2016	Solomon's Perjury	솔로몬의 위증	Chairman of the Political Foundation
2016	The Legend of the Blue Sea	푸른 바다의 전설	Cameo
2017	Queen of Mystery	추리의 여왕	Cameo
2017	Stranger	비밀의 숲	Minister of Justice Young Il-jae
2018	Mysterious Personal Shopper	인형의 집	Eun Ki-Tae
2018	Mr. Sunshine	미스터 션샤인	Go Sa-hong
2019	My Only One	하나뿐인 내편	Chairman Song
2019	Romance Is a Bonus Book	로맨스는 별책부록	Kang Byung-jun
2019	Perfume	퍼퓸	Choi Jang-tae
2019	Justice	저스티스	Seo Dong-seok
2019	The Tale of Nokdu	조선로코 – 녹두전	the old man who threw a stone
2021	Hometown Cha-Cha-Cha	갯마을 차차차	Grandpa Hong (Hong Du-sik's grandfather (special appearance)
2021	Reflection of You	너를 닮은 사람	Koo Gwang-mo
2022–2023	Bean Pods in My Eyes	내 눈에 콩깍지	President Jang
2023	Divorce Attorney Shin	신성한, 이혼	Seo Chang-jin

=== Television show ===
List of Television show
Year	Title		Role	Ref.
Year	English	Korean	Role	Ref.
1999–2009	The Clinic for Married Couples: Love and War	부부클리닉: 사랑과 전쟁	Associate judge	

== Stage ==
=== Theater performances as member of Dongnang Repertoire Theater Company ===
Theater performances as member of Dongnang Repertoire Theater Company
Year	Title		Role	Theater	Date	Notes/Ref.
Year	English	Korean	Role	Theater	Date	Notes/Ref.
1964	Othello	오셀로	James	Namsan Drama Center	—N/a	
1964	Prince of Magic/The Demon Prince	마의태자	Pil Seon	Namsan Drama Center	September 23 to 28	
1966	Shame	수치		Namsan Drama Center	March 9–12	
1966	I Want to Be Human	나도인간이되련다	–	Namsan Drama Center	May 16 to 20	
1969	Life	인생	Hwang Deok-sam	Namsan Drama Center	1969.6.27–6.30	
1970	The Birthday Party	생일파티	Petey	Namsan Drama Center	October 5–20	
1971	Surplus or not	잉여부부		Namsan Drama Center	October 1–10	
1971	Betting on love adaptation of Sleuth	사랑을내기에걸고	Andrew Wyke	Namsan Drama Center	1971.11.26—12.12	
1972	Sootduki Play adaptation of Scapin the Schemer	쇠뚝이놀이-스카펭의간계	Scapin	National Theater	April 17–21	
1972	Romeo and Juliet	로미오와 줄리엣		Namsan Drama Center	1972.9.30–10.9	
1973	Grass Tomb (Chobun)	초분	ensemble casts	Namsan Drama Center	1973.4.4–4.15	
1973	King Lear	리어왕	King Lear	Namsan Drama Center	1973.11.1–11.18	
1974	The Birthday Party	생일파티	Petey	Myongdong Arts Theater	1974.4.18–4.22	
1974	Tae (Lifecord)	태	King Sejo	Myongdong Arts Theater	April 18 to 22	
1974	Tae (Lifecord)	태	King Sejo	Namsan Drama Center	May 17 to June 30	
1974	Succession a.k.a Mass Game	출세기 (일명 "매스·게임")		Namsan Drama Center	1974.10.20–11.6	
1974	Luv	LUV	Milt	Namsan Drama Center	1974.5.17–6.30	
1975	Grass Tomb (Chobun)	초분	ensemble	Namsan Drama Center	April 13 to 26	
1975	Grass Tomb (Chobun)	초분	ensemble	Namsan Drama Center	May 8 to 9	
1975	Prince of Magic/The Demon Prince	마의태자	Pil Seon	Myeongdong Arts Theater	July 3 to 7	
1975	Prince of Magic/The Demon Prince	마의태자	Pil Seon	Busan Civic Center	August 16 to 17	
1975	Barefoot in the Park	맨발로공원을	Paul Bratter	Namsan Drama Center	October 9 to 20	
1975	Tae (Lifecord)	태	King Sejo	Namsan Drama Center	November 8 to 16	

=== Theater performances as member of Dongnang Repertoire World Tour ===
Theater performances as part of Dongrang Repertoire World Tour
Year	Title		Role	Theater	Date	Ref.
Year	English	Korean	Role	Theater	Date	Ref.
1977	Dongnang Repertory Theater Company's World Tour Return Commemorative Performance – Lifecord	태	King Sejo	Civic Hall Annex building	February 22–24	
1977	Dongnang Repertory Theater Company's World Tour Return Commemorative Performance – Prince Immortal (Hamlet)	하멸태자	Claudius	tour of 16 cities in 3 countries in the United States, France and the Netherlands	March 9 – May 30	
1977	ITI US Headquarters' World Theater Day invitation performance—Price Immortal (Hamlet)	하멸태자	Claudius	ITI US Headquarters Civic Center Annex	June 15 – 20	

=== Theater performances as member of NTOK ===
Theater play performances as member National Theatre Company of Korea
Year	Title		Role	Theater	Date	Notes/Ref.
Year	English	Korean	Role	Theater	Date	Notes/Ref.
1975	Jing Birok	징비록	Shin Shin-jin	National Theater Grand Theater	March 1 to 9	
1975	The Myth of Gorangpo	고랑포의 신화	Warrior Kim	National Theater Grand Theater	June 24 to 29	
1975	Wild Field	광야	Na Geol-seok	National Theater Grand Theater	August 6 to 11	
1975	Wilhelm Tell	빌헬름 텔	Werner Stauffacher	National Theater Grand Theater	November 27 to December 1	
1976	Roar	함성	Lim Byung-chan	National Theater Grand Theatre	Feb 27 to Mar 2	
1976	Sontag Hotel	손탁호텔	Lim Cheol-gyu	National Theater Grand Theatre	June 10 to 13	
1976	Night of January 16th	1월 16일 밤에 생긴 일	juror	National Theater Small Theatre	August 27 to 30	
1976	Peer Gynt	페르귄트	Peer Gynt	National Theater Grand Theatre	September 24 to 28	
1976	A Graveyard Looking Northward)	북향묘	Lee Seong-gye	National Theater Grand Theatre	November 25 to 29	
1977	Boy with a Straw Hat	초립동	General Gyebaek	National Theater Grand Theatre	March 2 to 6	
1977	Faust	파우스트	Wagner	National Theater Grand Theatre	June 29 to July 3	
1977	The Late Christoper Bean	크리스토퍼의 죽음	Haget	National Theater Small Theatre	September 15 to 19	
1978	Forest of Massacre	학살의 숲	Ha Myung-ho	National Theater Grand Theatre	November 24 to 28	
1978	Emile Bell	에밀레종	Il-jeon	National Theater Grand Theatre	March 1 to 5	
1978	Look Homeward, Angel: a Story of the buried life	천사여 고향을 보라	Ben	National Theater Small Theatre	April 19 to 28	
1978	Black River	흑하	Choi Jin-dong	National Theater Grand Theatre	June 21 to 24	
1978	Look Homeward, Angel: Story of the buried life	천사여 고향을 보라	Ben	National Theater Small Theatre	June 30 to July 3	
1978	Splash	물보라	Shin Ki-ri	National Theater Small Theatre	September 15 to 24	
1978	Splash	물보라	Shin Ki-ri	National Theater Small Theatre	November 8 to 12	
1979	Guest House	객사	Daedal	National Theater Grand Theatre	February 28 to March 4	
1979	Dom Juan	동쥐앙	Snagarelle	National Theater Small Theatre	April 19 to 26	
1979	Becket	베케트	Henry II	National Theater Grand Theatre	June 26 to July 2	
1979	The Portrait of Shaman	무녀도	villain	National Theater Small Theatre	September 4 to 13	
1979	Sachugi	사추기	Kim Sam-mak	National Theater Small Theatre	December 12 to 18	

=== Theater performances as freelancer ===
Theater play performances as freelancer
Year	Title		Role	Theater	Date	Ref.
Year	English	Korean	Role	Theater	Date	Ref.
1977	Waiting for Godot	고도를 기다리며	Estragon	Samil-ro Changgo Theater		
1977	Anna Christie	안나 크리스티	Chris	Civic Center Annex	Aug 26–30	
1978	Pharmacist	약장사	pharmacist	Space Love	January 1978	
1978	Shizuyu Banji is Dead	시즈위 밴지는 죽었다	Shizuyu Banji	Theater Hall Cecil Theater	Dec 8–15	
1980	Archery while Looking at the Sky	하늘 보고 활쏘기	Archer	Theater	1980	
1981	The Island	아일랜드	John	Experimental Theater	Feb 6 – March 31	
1982	Jurassic People	쥬라기의 사람들	People	Center Culture and Art Hall Grand Theater	Oct 7–12	
1982	Wedding Day	시집가는 날	Man	Arts and Culture Center grand theater	Dec 18—19	
1982	The Taming of the Shrew	말괄량이 길들이기	Petrucio	Sungui Music Hall	June 1–7	
1982	The Taming of the Shrew	말괄량이 길들이기	Petrucio	Art and Culture Center Grand Theater	1982.5.27–5.31	
1983	Red and White	적과백	Lee Hak-gu	Arts and Culture Center Grand Theater	Sep 16–21	
1983	Red and White	적과백	Lee Hak-gu	Daejeon Civic Center; Mokpo Central Theater; Busan Civic Center; Jinhae Maritime Theater; Daegu Civic Center; Chungbuk Arts Center	Oct 27 – Nov 3	
1984	Toh's Birth	토선생전	Malttugi	Culture and Art Hall Grand Theater	Dec 12	
1984	10th Theater Company Sajo Performance – Toseonsaengjeon	제10회 극단사조 공연 — 토선생전	Pettttt	Art and Culture Center Grand Theater	1984.12.12–12.12	
1986	Poison	독배		Daehangno Theater	June 15 – July 15	
1986	Padam Padam Padam	빠담 빠담 빠담	Paul	Sejong Center for the Performing Arts Grand Theater	Dec 24–28	
1987	Room in the Woods	숲속의 방	Father	Small theater Sanwoollim	April 3–30	
1987	Impossible	불가불가	Actor 5	Arts and Culture Center Grand Theater	Oct 3–7	
1987	Miss Julie	쥴리양	Jang	Arts and Culture Center Small Theater	Dec 7–16	
1988	Aquarium	수족관	Edgar	Daehangno Theater	March 18 – April 23	
1988	Poison	독배	Lee Ho-jae	Daehangno Theater	June 15 – July 15	
1988	(1988) Culture and Arts Festival Seoul International Theater Festival: Impossible	(1988) 문화예술축전 서울국제연극제 : 불가불가	Actor 5	Arts and Culture Center Grand Theater	Aug 22–26	
1989	Hamlet	햄릿	King	Hoam Art Hall	April 15–23	
1990	Accidental Death of an Anarchist	어느 무정부주의자의 사고사	Mad man	Sanwoolim Theater	April 3 – May 6	
1990	The Story of Chŏnde-gi	뻔데기전		Experimental Theater Unni-dong, Seoul	June 29 to July 22	
1990	Antony and Cleopatra	안토니와 클레오파트라	Anthony	Experimental Theater Hoam Art Hall	Oct 20 – Nov 4	
1990	Night Inn	밤주막	Sa-jin	Arts and Culture Center Grand Theater	Dec 3–27	
1991	The Marriage of Figaro	휘가로의 결혼	Figaro	Arts and Culture Center	June 27	
1991	Jonadab	요나답	Jonadab	Arts and Culture Center	12.5–12.11	
1991	Macbeth	맥베드	Machbeth	Arts and Culture Center Grand Theater	Feb 27 – March 5	
1991	The Post Office	우체국	Amal	Seoul Arts Center's Towol Theater	4.16–5.9	
1991	Macbeth	맥베드	Machbeth	Culture and Art Hall Grand Theater	May 9–15	
1991	Rise	출세기	Villager	Culture and Art Hall Grand Theater	Nov 15–28	
1992	(New Wave) Shin Jang Han-mong	(신파극)新 장한몽	Jang Man-gil	Arts and Culture Center Grand Theater	March 23–31	
1992	Shin Jang Han-mong	新 장한몽	Jang Man-gil	Arts and Culture Center Grand Theater	May 7–20	
1992	The Three Sisters of Anton Chekhov	안톤·체홉의 세자매	Clugin	Arts and Culture Center Grand Theater	July 1–8	
1992	16th Seoul Theater Festival: Strangers	제16회 서울연극제: 이방인들	Yeon Ki-seop	Arts and Culture Center Grand Theater	Sep 2–7	
1992	Equus	에쿠우스	Dysart	Experimental Theater	Nov	
1993	A Pig and a Motorcycle	돼지와 오토바이	man with a cigarette	Bukchon Changwoo Theater	March 24 – May 27	
1994	Macbeth	맥베드	Macbeth	Arts and Culture Center Grand Theater	May 24–30	
1994	Stalin	스탈린	Stalin	Gangnam	June	
1994	The Constant Wife	아내란 직업의 여인	John	Hoam Art Hall	November 11 to 27	
1994–1995	The stars love each other with meaning in the world	별님들은 세상에 한 사람씩 의미를 두어 사랑한다는데	Jung Hoon	Hakjeon Small Theater	Dec 1 – Jan 31	
1995	Three Women Living Alone	혼자사는 세 여자	Sam	Jeongdong Theater	8.1–8.20	
1995	I Am Hamlet	나는 햄릿이다	Hamlet	Seoul Arts Center	November 1 to December 30.	
1996	Clowns of the Empire	제국의 광대들	manager	Arts and Culture Center Grand Theater	April 15–23	
1996	The Bridges of Madison County	메디슨 카운티의 다리	Robert Kincaid	Yonkang Hall	Sep 6 – 22	
1997	Festival of Rainy Days	비오는 날의 축제	Professor Choi	Dongsung Art Center Small Theatre	Sep—Nov 9	
1998	A Thousand Years of Beasts	천년의 수인	Ahn Doo-hee	Dongsung Art Center Small Theatre	May 8 – June 14	
1998	An Enemy of the People	민중의 적	Doctor Thomas Stokeman	Sejong Center for the Performing Arts small auditorium	March 20 to April 6	
1999	Uncle Tongja and the Giant Tree	툇자아저씨와 거목	Lee Tae-gong	Arts and Culture Center grand theater	July 14–22	
1999	Love	사랑		Yonkang Hall	Nov 24 – Dec 19	
1999	Shinwi of the Joseon Dynasty	조선제왕신위	In-Jo	Arts and Culture Center grand theater	12.17–12.26	

=== Theater performances as freelancer in 2000s ===
Theater play performances as freelancer
Year	Title		Role	Theater	Date	Ref.
Year	English	Korean	Role	Theater	Date	Ref.
2000	Please Turn Off the Light	불 좀 꺼주세요	Sa-nae (man)	Seoul Arts Center Towol Theater	3.4–3.26	
2001	Hello You	당신, 안녕	Dok Go-young	Arts and Culture Center Small Theater	3.16–4.4	
2001	Hamlet	햄릿	Claudius	National Theater Haeoreum Theater	09.07–09.16	
2001	2001 SPAF Seoul Performing Arts Festival: Princess Bari	2001 SPAF 서울공연예술제: 바리공주	Baek-du	Sejong Center for the Performing Arts small theater	10.12–10.15	
2002	A Streetcar Named Desire	욕망이라는 이름의 전차	Friendship Appearance	Center for Arts and Culture Arts Theater grand theater	7.6–7.17	
2002	Lean on Someone's Shoulder	누군가의 어깨에 기대어	Ahn Kwang-nam	Center for Arts and Culture Arts Theater small theater	2002.6.7–6.23	
2003	11th Young Theater Festival – Mara and Thaad	제11회 젊은연극제; 마라와 사드	Kuul-Mie	Creative concert hall	6.27–6.29	
2003	Thief Who Stole The Buddha	붓다를 훔친 도둑	Monk	Small theater egg and nucleus	2.6–3.2	
2003	Graduate	졸업	Ahn Pil-sang	Literature Promotion Institute art theater small theater	10.25–11.2	
2003	Death of a Salesman	세일즈맨의 죽음	Willy Loman	Arko Arts Theater Small Theater	05.21–06.01	
2005	A Story of Two Knights and the World of Knight Errantry	세상을 편력하는 두 기사 이야기	Knight 1	Arko Arts Theater Small Theater	03.24–04.10	
2005	Love Letter	러브레터	Andy	Hanyang Repertory Theater	10.21–12.31	
2005	Dragon and Tiger	용호상박	Beom	Namsan Drama Center	Nov 24 – Dec 7	
2006	Number	넘버	Salter	installation theater Jeongmiso	5.18–6.4	
2007	Dragon and Tiger	용호상박	Beom	Namsan Drama Center	Feb 17 – 25	
2007	Let's Go Over the Hill	언덕을 넘어서 가자	Wan-ae	Hakjeon Blue Small Theater	05.24–06.10	
2007	Forever Love	영영 사랑	Man	Namsangol Hanok Village Seoul Namsan Gugakdang	12.06–12.16	
2008	2008 Seoul Theater Festival – Dr. Cook's Garden	2008 서울연극제 – 쿠크 박사의 정원	Dr. Leonard Cook	Arko Arts Theater Grand Theater	05.16–05.25	
2008	Human Time	인간의 시간	Lee Won-hyeong	Arko Arts Theater Grand Theater	12.19–12.27	
2009	2009 Seoul Theater Festival – Impossible	2009 서울연극제 – 불가불가	Director role in the play	Arko Arts Theater Grand Theater	05.09–05.15	
2009	The Seafarer	뱃사람	Richard Harkin	Arko Arts Theater Grand Theater	10.08–10.18	
2009	Unhyeongung Brother (2009) (10th) Okrang Drama Award Winner	운현궁 오라버니	Park Young-ho	Namsan Arts Center	12.4–12.13	
2010	Amy's View	에이미	Frank	Arko Arts Theater Small Theater	02.05–02.21	
2010	General Oh's Claw	오장군의 발톱	East country commander	Myeongdong Arts Theater	04.09–04.25	
2010	Amy's View - Daejeon	에이미 – 대전	Toby	Daejeon Arts Center Ensemble Hall	04.29–05.01	
2010	Even If They Betray You	그대를 속일지라도	Lee Jin-baek	Arko Arts Theater Grand Theater	June 18–27	
2011	2011 Seoul Theater Festival Invitational Performance: Gaze – The night I moved in, I first heard a man's voice	(2011) 서울연극제 기획초청공연: 응시 – 이사 온 날 밤, 처음 남자의 음성을 들었습니다	Jun-tae	Daehakro Arts Theater Grand Theater	05.12–05.15	
2011	The Habit of Art	예술하는 습관	Fitz (Oden)	Myeongdong Arts Theater	06.21–07.10	
2011	Woyzeck	보이체크	Doctor	Daehakro Arts Theater Grand Theater	08.21–09.10	
2011	Amadeus	아마데우스	Antonio Charlieri	Myeongdong Arts Theater	12.07–01.01	
2012	Tuesday with Morrie	모리와 함께한 화요일	Morrie	Arko Arts Theater Small Theater	05.31–06.17	
2012	Long Journey into The Night	밤으로의 긴 여로	Tyrone	Myeongdong Arts Theater	10.12–11.11	
2013	The Women Who Stole a Battlefield	전쟁터를 훔친 여인들	General	National Theater Company, Baek Baek-hee Jang Min-ho Theater	11.27–12.08	
2013	Amy	에이미	Frank	Myeongdong Arts Theater	02.15–03.10	
2013	Creditors	채권자들	Gustav	Arko Arts Theater Small Theater	05.10–05.26	
2014	Skylight	스카이라잇	Tom Sergeant	Daehakro Arts Theater Small Theater	06.12–06.26	
2015	The House Where Boy B Live	소년B가 사는 집	Dad	National Theater Company Baek Baek Hee Jang Min Ho Theater	04.14–04.26	
2015	Han River Flows	한강은 흐른다	Ensemble	Namsan Arts Center Drama Center	06.18–06.28	
2016	Theater Visit	연극 방문	Lee Joo-yong	Arko Arts Theater Small Theater	02.04–02.21	
2016	Longevity Association	장수상회	Kim Seong-chil	Dongsung Art Center Dongsung Hall	05.05–05.29	
2016	Mother	어머니	Pierre	Myeongdong Arts Theater	07.14–08.15	
2016	Unpleasant Pleasure	불역쾌재	Gyeong-suk	LG Art Center	10.26–11.06	
2017	Longevity Association-Chuncheon	장수상회 – 춘천	Kim Seong-chil	Chuncheon Culture and Arts Center	05.13–05.13	
2017	(2017) SPAF Seoul International Performing Arts Festival: White Rabbit Red Rabbit <Lee Ho-jae>	(2017) SPAF 서울국제공연예술제: 하얀 토끼 빨간 토끼 <이호재>	himself	Arko Arts Theater small theater	9.24–9.24	
2017	The 2nd Never Blue Theater Festival – Let's Go Over the Hill	제2회 늘푸른 연극제 – 언덕을 넘어서 가자	Wan-ae	Daehakro Arts Theater Small Theater	08.17–08.27	
2017	Cat on a Hot Tin Roof	뜨거운 양철지붕 위의 고양이	Big Daddy	Seoul Arts Center CJ Towol Theater	10.18–11.05	
2019	Leben des Galilei (Life of Galileo)	갈릴레이의 생애	Inquisitor, University Treasurer	Myeongdong Arts Theater	04.05–04.28	
2022	5th Chinese Play Reading Performance: Jojo and Yang Su	제5회 중국희곡 낭독공연: 조조와 양수	Lee Ho-jae	Myeongdong Arts Theater	April 14–16	
2022	Jealousy	질투	Wan-gyu	Hakjeon Blue Small Theater	05.27–06.05	
2022	Macbeth	맥베스	Macbeth	National Theater of Korea	October 10	
2023	Othello	오셀로	Brabantio	CJ Towol Theatre	05.12–06.04	

== Awards and nominations ==
Award(s) and Nomination(s) received
Year	Award ceremony	Category	Nominee / Work	Result	Ref.
1972	Hankook Ilbo Theater Film Arts Award	Best New Actor	Surpluss or Not	Won	
1972	8th Korean Drama and Film Arts Awards	Best New Actor	Surpluss or Not	Won	
1977	2nd Korean Theater Arts Awards Korea Theater Association	Best Actor Theater	Peer Gynt	Won	
1977	13th Korean Theater and Film Arts Awards	Best Actor Theater	Peer Gynt	Won	
1977	Hankook Ilbo Theater Film Arts Awards	Best Actor Theater	Peer Gynt	Won	
1981	17th Korean Drama and Film Arts Awards	Best Actor Theater	Island	Won	
1988	25th Dong-A Theater Awards	Best Actor Theater	Aquarium	Won	
1989	25th Baeksang Arts Awards	Best Actor Theater	Aquarium	Won	
1991	27th Baeksang Arts Awards	Best Actor Theater	The Story of Chŏnde-gi	Won	
1992	Actors Association Acting Award	Best Actor Theater	Lee Ho-jae	Won	
1992	16th Seoul International Theater Festival	Acting Award	Stranger	Won	
1994	4th Lee Hae-rang Theater Award (Note: The Lee Hae-rang Theater Award was established by the Lee Hae-rang Theater Foundation to commemorate the Lee Hae-rang, a pioneer in the Korean theater industry.)	Actor	Lee Ho-jae	Won	
2003	Seoul Institute of the Arts Alumni Association	Light of Life Award	Lee Ho-jae	Won	
2006	Busan International Film Festival	Actor of the Year Award	Lee Ho-jae	Won	

=== State honors ===
List of State Honour
Country	Award Ceremony	Year	Honor	Ref.
South Korea's Government	Korean Culture and Arts Awards (Note: Since 1973, honors are given at Cultural Day (문화의 날), 3rd Saturday in October by the Ministry of Culture, Sports and Tourism)	2011	Bogwan Cultural Merit (Level 3)	
The Seoul Metropolitan Government	51st Seoul Culture Awards (Note: The Seoul Culture Award, established in 1948, is an award with a long history and tradition to award those who have made significant contributions to the cultural development and promotion of culture and art in Seoul.)	2002	Award in Performance Category	

=== Listicle ===
Name of publisher, year listed, name of listicle, and placement
Publisher	Year	List	Placement	Ref.
The Dong-A Ilbo	2003	[Best in our field selected by professionals] Plays and musicals – Best Actor	1st	
