= Jeon Moo-song =

South Korean actor (born 1941)

- Born: September 28, 1941 (age 85); Nae-dong, Jinsen, Japanese Korea (today Incheon, South Korea)
- Other name: Chon Moo-song
- Education: Drama Center Theater Academy
- Occupation: Actor
- Years active: 1964–present
- Spouse: Lee Ki-soon
- Children: Jeon Hyun-ah (daughter); Jeon Jin-woo (son)
- Relatives: Kim Jin-man (son in law); Kim Tae-yoon (grandson); Kim Mi-rim (daughter in law)

Korean name
- Hangul: 전무송
- Hanja: 全茂松
- RR: Jeon Musong
- MR: Chŏn Musong

Jeon Moo-song (Korean: 전무송; born September 28, 1941) is a South Korean actor. Jeon began his career on stage in the play Chunhyangjeon in 1964 and has since been active in Korean theatre, film and television. In 1977, he performed as the title character in Crown Prince Hamyeol (an adaptation of Hamlet) at La MaMa in New York City, which marked the first time a Korean theatre troupe had traveled outside Korea. Jeon also won two trophies from the Grand Bell Awards for his portrayal of an eccentric monk in Im Kwon-taek's 1981 film Mandala.

== Early life and education ==
Jeon was born on September 28, 1941, in Nae-dong, Jinsen (modern-day Incheon), Korea, during the period of Japanese rule. He was the eldest of seven children born into a working-class fishing family. His father originated from Haeju, Kōkai Province (now part of Hwanghae Province), Korea, and his mother is from Seosan, Chungcheongnam-do. During his childhood, Jeon frequently visited his maternal relatives in Seosan. His uncle, a farmer and storyteller, performed one-man shows that significantly influenced Jeon. Supported by his maternal aunt and uncle, Jeon was the only child in his family to attend kindergarten.

During his second year of elementary school, Jeon and his family evacuated their home due to the outbreak of the Korean War. He continued his education at a school near the evacuation site until the family returned to Incheon following the conclusion of the conflict. Around this time, Jeon began playing baseball at the suggestion of a friend and initially aspired to become a professional athlete.

In the 1950s, Jeon gained admission to Incheon Middle School, a prestigious institution at the time. His enrollment was a source of significant pride for his father, who hosted a celebration for local residents to mark the achievement. Although Jeon intended to continue playing baseball, the school lacked an established team. He organized a baseball club with fellow students; however, the group was soon disbanded by the principal, who argued that athletic pursuits would distract from academic responsibilities.

Following middle school, Jeon grew concerned regarding the financial burden of higher education on his family, as he had six younger siblings. At the encouragement of principal Gil Young-hee, he enrolled at Incheon Technical High School (now Incheon Mechanical Engineering High School) to study mechanical engineering. This decision resulted in a three day period of conflict with his father, who disapproved of the vocational path.

Before beginning high school, Jeon worked briefly at the Ae Kwan Theater, where he assisted a friend employed as a signboard designer. His initial duties involved whitewashing the boards for new advertisements. Though he resigned upon starting high school, his interest in the arts persisted. He frequently bypassed school hours to visit the theater district in Sinpo-dong, changing into civilian clothes to watch films and live theater. At Ae Kwan Theater he watched movies such as "Break Through the Wall" and "Long Live Freedom", along with stage productions by the Yeoseong Gukgeuk Company and Lim Chun-Aeng's Gukgeuk. He was particularly moved by the play "Princess Nangrang and Prince Hodong" and remembered "Blue Bird" with great clarity. His exposure to cinematic works like "Stagecoach" and "Samson and Delilah" eventually solidified his desire to pursue a career in acting. Jeon participated in his high school's musical program as a clarinetist in the school band.

Upon graduating, Jeon gained admission to the Department of Theater and Film at Hanyang University. The high cost of tuition, however, presented a significant financial barrier. Following a period of severe distress, Jeon attempted self harm by ingesting a substance he believed to be rat poison. He survived the incident and subsequently questioned his decision to attempt suicide.

Jeon later underwent practical training at the Incheon Mechanical Workshop under the Incheon Railroad Administration. Due to positive performance evaluations, he was hired as an apprentice following his training period. His primary responsibility involved the repetitive machining of bolts and nuts. While observing the accumulation of red, rusting iron shavings beneath his machinery, Jeon began to view the decaying metal as a metaphor for his own professional stagnation. Reflecting on this experience, Jeon stated that the sight of the iron powder made him feel as though he were rusting. He questioned his career path and eventually resigned from the company to pursue his original ambition in the arts.

Following his resignation from the mechanical workshop, Jeon accepted a position as a collection agent at the Incheon branch of the Seoul Shinmun. His responsibilities included managing newspaper distribution to local student carriers and soliciting door to door subscriptions. The flexible schedule afforded by this role allowed Jeon to watch a wide variety of films, which intensified his interest in pursuing a career as a cinema actor. During this period, he frequented bookstores to research the industry and spent significant time in the Chungmuro district, a hub for the Korean film industry.

After he had spent over a year working at the newspaper, he was encouraged by friends from Seorabeol Arts College (predecessor of Chung-Ang University College of Arts) who said, "You are so handsome. Why don't you try acting?" Flattered by the compliments, Jeon and his friends gathered at a bakery to plan a theatrical production. When the group was unable to pay the bill, his friends fled, leaving Jeon to settle the debt. Lacking sufficient cash, he was forced to surrender his high school graduation watch to the shop owner as collateral. To retrieve the watch, Jeon requested an advance on his wages from his branch manager. Upon hearing the request, the manager provided the funds along with two tickets to a 1962 production of Hamlet, the opening performance of the Namsan Drama Center. It turned out that the branch manager's daughter worked as a receptionist there.

Jeon traveled from Incheon to the Namsan Drama Center to attend the performance of Hamlet, directed by Yoo Chi-jin. He was profoundly affected by the production, which featured prominent actors such as Kim Dong-won in the title role, Jang Min-ho as King Claudius, and Hwang Jeong-soon as Queen Gertrude. The experience was so transformative that Jeon returned the following day to use his second ticket. During this repeat visit, he discovered a recruitment notice for the Drama Center's affiliated theater academy printed on the back of the program. Identifying this as an opportunity, he decided to pursue it.

For his entrance audition, Jeon was required to perform a physical improvisation task involving the breaking of a honey jar. He successfully passed the examination and was admitted to the Namsan Drama Center Actor Academy in 1962. (Note: Seoul Institute of the Arts was established by Dongnang Arts Foundation. Dongnang Arts Foundation has its roots in the Korean Theater Research Institute founded by a scholar "Dongnang" Yoo Chi-jin in 1958. In 1958, Yoo Chi-jin founded the Korean Theater Research Institute. Dongnang also built the affiliated Drama Center (Namsan Arts Center) and Theater Library in 1962. In the same year, he also started the Korean Theater Academy, which has become what is today Department of Theater and Film of Seoul Institute of the Arts.) Founded by the playwright and director Yoo Chi-jin, the academy served as the predecessor to the current Department of Theater and Film at the Seoul Institute of the Arts. Jeon was a member of the academy's first class in 1962, studying alongside future notable figures in Korean entertainment, including actors Shin Goo, Lee Ho-jae, Min Ji-hwan, Kim Ki-soo, Ban Hyo-jeong (who did not graduate), and playwright Yoon Dae-seong.

== Career ==
=== 1960s to 1970s: Beginning with Dong-rang Repertory Theater ===
Dongrang Yoo Chi-jin recognized Jeon's talent and gave him the opportunity to play the role of Lee Mong-ryeong in the 1963 graduate performance of "Chunhyangjeon". The following year, Jeon played the lead character in "Prince of Horses", a play that commemorated the founding of the Drama Center theater company.

After completing his studies in 1964, Jeon joined the Dong-rang Repertory Theater. In 1970, he returned to the company after completing three years of military service. However, he struggled with the role of Stanley in Harold Pinter's "Birthday Party", which was completely different from the historical or realism dramas he was used to perform. He was ultimately replaced by Shin Goo, and this decision left him feeling angry and frustrated. He ended up drinking heavily and protested against the director Yoo Deok-hyung, causing a commotion that shook the entire troupe. The day after the incident, Jeon received a call from Dongrang. At the time, Jeon feared that he would be kicked out of the theater company. However, to his surprise, Dongrang offered him a cigarette. Though Jeon declined several times, Dongrang insisted, saying "You drink well and smoke well. Smoke it!" and even lit it for him.

During their conversation, Dongrang told Jeon this: "You have one great weapon that other actors do not have, and that is compassion. When you stand on stage, you make the audience feel compassion,' he said. 'I was thinking of you like that, but would it be okay if you acted like that? Be human first. That way, you will become a great actor." This conversation had a profound impact on Jeon, and he began to improve his attitude from that day forward. Jeon stayed at the trope for five more years. In 1975, Jeon with his fellow actor Lee Ho-jae and playwright Oh Taeseok joined National Theater Company of Korea (NTCK). He played various characters as an actor of the National Theater Company.

In 1977, Jeon joined The Dongnang Repertory World Tour. The troupe performed as part of the World Theater Month commemorative event, sponsored by the USA headquarters of the International Association of Dramatic Arts, in New York, US from March 15. Following this event, the troupe toured various cities in the US, including Dallas, Minneapolis, Los Angeles, and Hawaii, as well as Lane in France, Paris, and the Netherlands, to showcase their level of theater to audiences worldwide.

The repertoire of the world tour included "Tae" and "Prince Ha Myeol", an adaptation by Ahn Min-soo from Shakespeare's Hamlet. "Tae", which was announced in the spring and fall of 1974 and the fall of 1975, portrays the history of the early Yi Dynasty surrounding the usurpation of the throne and the tragedy of Saksin. Before their departure, the troupe presented one of their tour works, "Tae", written by Tae-seok Oh and directed by Ahn Min-soo, from February 22 to 24 at the annex of the Seoul Civic Center. This event was sponsored by JoongAng Ilbo and Dongyang Broadcasting.

=== 1980s: Theater ===
In 1981, Jeon became widely known to the general public by playing the role of a monk with Ahn Seong-ki in director Im Kwon-taek's film 'Mandala'. "When I filmed with director Lim, he showed respect to the extras and supporting actors. I felt a sense of respect as a human being. If Yoo Chi-jin, Hae-rang Lee, and Young-woong Lim paved the way for me in theater, director Lim is like that in film."

He became popular with Sanwoolim's 'Waiting for Godot'. After gaining popularity with 'Mandala', offers to appear on the night stage followed. They said that they would pay a lot of money if they appeared in monk clothes and sang. The arrangers said that locusts are in season, so grab your share when they are popular. Then he replied: "I am not a locust, I am Jeon Mu-song." Since then, he has appeared frequently on TV screens, especially through 'TV Literature' and showed off his outstanding acting skills. Even so, he always kept the theater stage.

In 1983, Jeon founded his own theater company, Jihyeon, and a year later, in 1984, he became a member of the theater company Sanwoolim. In 1992, he founded the Theater Development Research Association and became its representative. Two years later, in 1994, he were invited to participate in the World Youth Theater Festival in Okinawa, Japan.

In 1995, Jeon was part of the Housekeeping Coordinator. It is clear from their experiences that they have had a successful career in theater, participating in different productions and theater companies, touring internationally, and founding their own theater company and research association.

Jeon is also the subject of an internet meme titled "High Expectations Asian Father" wherein his image, taken from his cameo in the film Epitaph, is paired with an exaggerated quote usually associated with the stereotypical image of an Asian parent trying to set a high standard for their children.

Since 2006, he has been active as an artistic director of the Gyeonggi Provincial Theater Company. In this literary concert, he narrates Kim Dong-in's potato, Hyun Jin-geon's lucky day, and Love Letter with Superintendent B.

=== 2020s ===
The play Life Delivery, which commemorated the 60th anniversary of Jeon Moo-song's debut and his 80th birthday, premiered from February 4 to 7, 2020 at the Palgong Hall of the Daegu Culture and Arts Center. Co-hosted by the Daegu Culture and Arts Center and Theatre Company Haru, the production depicted the lives of a former vice principal and a barber working as senior delivery couriers after their retirement. Jeon and Kang In-deok shared the role of Lee Jin-beop, the former vice principal, while Choi Jong-won performed the role of Jang Ga-wi, the barber. The production was overseen by Kim Gun-pyo, a professor of theater and film at Daekyung University.

In 2022, Jeon participated in the documentary I Love What I See, which explores the history and cultural significance of the Ae Kwan Theater. Established in 1895, the venue is recognized as the first theater in Korea to be founded by Korean nationals, representing a significant link to Jeon's early formative experiences in the arts.

== Personal life ==
Jeon married Lee Ki-soon, a friend of his younger sister, in 1970. The couple had two children: a daughter, Jeon Hyeon-ah and a son, Jeon Jin-woo. Due to persistent financial difficulties, the children were temporarily raised by Lee's family. During this period, Lee supported the household through various informal jobs, including transporting goods from weaving factories to sell at Namdaemun Market.

Both of Jeon's children pursued careers in the performing arts. Jeon Hyeon-ah became a playwright and actress, and she is married to theater director Kim Jin-man. Jeon Jin-woo also became an actor and is married to actress Kim Mi-rim.

== Filmography ==
=== Film ===
Year	Title	Role
1978	Acting Class	
1981	Mandala	Ji-san
1982	Abengo Airborne Corps	Operations staff
1982	Woman of Fire '82	
1982	The Chrysanthemum and the Clown	
1983	Women Don't Fear the Night	
1984	The Woman Who Shot the Man	Jung In-ho
1984	To My Children with Love	
1984	The Fire of Tandra	Lawyer Moon
1984	You Can't Stop a Flowing River	
1985	Adultery Tree	
1985	Deer Hunting	
1985	Graduation Journey	
1986	Gilsoddeum	
1986	Hwang Jin-ie	
1986	Seoul Is Cloudy with Rain Showers	
1987	Our Joyful Young Days	
1987	Prince Yeonsan	
1987	Gorgeous Transformation	
1987	Son of Wind	
1987	Hello, God	
1988	Adada	Father
1988	The Chameleon's Poem	Poet Cheon
1988	Wasteland	
1988	The Isle of Shiro	Min-woo
1989	Come Come Come Upward	Monk
1989	Seoul Rainbow	Artist Na
1989	Gagman	Director
1989	Country of Fire	Company president Shin
1990	Moonlight Over University Town	Heo Byung-soo
1990	My Love, My Bride	Editor-in-chief
1991	Stairways of Heaven	Jung Gi-seob
1991	Beyond the Mountain	Mu-bul
1991	Silver Stallion	Hwang Hun-jang
1991	For Agnes	Father Kim
1991	Mary Jane	
1991	Fire and Blood	Jung Sa-yong
1992	Bihwang	Juk-san
1992	Twenty Seven Roses	Kyung-ja's father
1992	Easy Virtue	
1993	In Your Name When the Morning Comes	Jang-gil
1993	A Honeymoon Trip	
1994	In a Handful of Time	Professor Lee
1994	Young Lover	Professor Oh
1995	Mugoonghwa - Korean National Flower	Kim Hyung-jin
1995	48 + 1	Hong-seok
1995	Rehearsal	
1996	Love Story	Man at furniture store
1996	Albatross	Soryeong
1996	Crocodile	Grandfather
1997	D-Day	
1997	Robinson Crusoe '97 (re-released in 2013 as Kid Cast Away 2013)	Old man
1998	Blues	Sergeant Go
1998	Sung-chul	
1999	White Valentine	Kim Jeong-min's grandfather
1999	The Harmonium in My Memory	Principal Hwang
1999	Cinematographer Jung Il-sung: 색과 빛으로 조율하는 아픔!	Documentary interviewer
2001	Turtle Hero	Dragon King
2002	Yesterday	Priest
2002	Dig or Die	Jin-hee
2003	Garden of Heaven	Choi Moon-do
2003	A Little Monk	Woodcutter
2007	Epitaph	Professor Park Jung-nam (cameo)
2007	M	Bartender
2008	Little Prince	Hee-soo's father
2008	Eye for an Eye	Ahn Hyeok-tae (cameo)
2009	My Father	Father
2010	Hear the Song of the Woods	
2011	Beautiful Legacy	Dr. Lee Myeong-sik
2012	Snow Is on the Sea	Dr. Jo
2014	100 Great Years of Korean Cinema	Documentary commentary
2014	My Love, My Bride	Pan Hae-il
2016	The Bacchus Lady	Jae-woo
2016	Curtain Call	Jang Jin-tae
2017	The Bros	Choon-bae (special appearance)
2022	Life Is Beautiful	
2024	Dead Man	

=== Television series ===
Year	Title	Role	Notes/Ref.
1981	First Republic	Yi Gwangsu	
1983	The Foundation	Yi Saek	
1984	500 Years of Joseon: The Ume Tree in the Midst of the Snow	Han Hwak	
1986	Wonhyo Daesa	Wonhyo	
1987	Eldest Sister-in-law		
1989	Wangrung's Kin	Hwang Il-cheon	
1990	Freezing Point		
1990	In Search of og		
1990	Earthling		
1992	The Beginning of a New Day		
1994	Police	Oh Hye-seong	
1994	Adam's City		
1995	Your Voice	Jung-hoon	
1996	Colors		(episode 3: "The Reason Gray Is Beautiful")
1996	Reporting for Duty	General Cha Hyung-oh, 6th Infantry Division	
1996	Im Kkeok-jeong	Seo Rim	
1998	Until the Azalea Blooms		
1998	The King and the Queen	King Munjong	
1999	Queen	Jang-mi's father	
1999	Kuk-hee	Jang Tae-hwa	
2000	Look Back in Anger	Chief of police	
2000	Taejo Wang Geon	Choi Seung-woo	
2002	Zoo People	Go Dae-sik	
2002	Rustic Period	Governor-general Saito	
2003	Age of Warriors	Dudueul	
2003	A River Flows in Everyone's Mind	Gyeong-jae	
2004	People of the Water Flower Village	Yoo Joon-tae	
2007	Several Questions That Make Us Happy		
2008	Bichunmoo		(voice)
2009	Empress Cheonchu	Lee Ji-baek	
2009	Two Wives	Yoon Jang-soo	
2009	The Queen Returns	Chairman Kang	
2010	Quiz of God 2		(guest)
2010	First Marriage	Elder Hwang	
2011	Umjine	Jinsa Kim	
2011	Brain	Kim Shin-woo	(guest)
2011	Insu, the Queen Mother	King Sejong	
2012	The King of Dramas	Watanabe	
2013	A Tale of Two Sisters	Han Ki-seok	
2019	Birthday Letter	old Kim Moo-gil	
2020	Money Game	Elder Kwak	
2020	Nobody Knows	Kwon Jae-chun	
2020	The King: Eternal Monarch	Lee Jong-in / Prince Buyeong	
2022	Tomorrow	Lee Young-cheon	Cameo
2022	If You Wish Upon Me	Mr. Byun	
2022	May It Please the Court	Jang Byung-chun	

=== Variety show ===
Year	Title	Notes
1997–1998	Saturday Mystery Theatre	Host
2011–present	The Clinic for Married Couples: Love and War - Season 2	Chief judge
2013	Onya Onya (Yes Yes)	Cast member

== Theater ==
=== As member of Dongnang Repertoire Theater Company ===
Theater performances as member of Dongnang Repertoire Theater Company
Year	Title		Role	Theater	Date	Ref.
Year	English	Korean	Role	Theater	Date	Ref.
1964	Tale of Chunhyang	춘향전	Lee Mongryong	Namsan Drama Center	April 7 to 12	
1964	Othello	오셀로	James	Namsan Drama Center	—N/a	
1964	Prince of Magic/The Demon Prince	마의태자	Pil Seon	Namsan Drama Center	September 23 to 28	
1965	Shame	수치		Namsan Drama Center	April 1 to 4	
1965	Pungwoon Anagyu	풍운아나운규		Namsan Drama Center	June 3 to 7	
1965	Daechunhyangjeon	대춘향전		Namsan Drama Center	December 10 to 12	
1966	Smoking a cigarette	담배내기		Namsan Drama Center	February 2 to 4	
1966	Shame	수치		Namsan Drama Center	March 9–12	
1967	Sanha-dashi Purojiri	산하는다시푸르러지리		Namsan Drama Center	February 1 to 4	
1967	Sanha-dashi Purojiri	산하는다시푸르러지리		Namsan Drama Center	February 6 to March 1	
1970	The Birthday Party	생일파티	Stanley Webber	Namsan Drama Center	October 5–20	
1971	Surplus or not	잉여부부		Namsan Drama Center	October 1–10	
1972	Sootduki Play adaptation of Scapin the Schemer	쇠뚝이놀이-스카펭의간계	Scapin	National Theater	April 17–21	
1972	Romeo and Juliet	로미오와 줄리엣		Namsan Drama Center	1972.9.30–10.9	
1973	Grass Tomb (Chobun)	초분	ensemble casts	Namsan Drama Center	1973.4.4-4.15	
1973	King Lear	리어왕	King Lear	Namsan Drama Center	1973.11.1–11.18	
1974	The Birthday Party	생일파티	Stanley Webber	Myongdong Arts Theater	April 18 to 22	
1974	Tae (Lifecord)	태	King Sejo	Myongdong Arts Theater	April 18 to 22	
1974	Tae (Lifecord)	태	King Sejo	Namsan Drama Center	May 17 to June 30	
1974	Succession a.k.a Mass Game	출세기 (일명 "매스·게임")		Namsan Drama Center	1974.10.20–11.6	
1975	Grass Tomb (Chobun)	초분	ensemble	Namsan Drama Center	April 13 to 26	
1975	Grass Tomb (Chobun)	초분	ensemble	Namsan Drama Center	May 8 to 9	
1975	Prince of Magic/The Demon Prince	마의태자	Pil Seon	Myeongdong Arts Theater	July 3 to 7	
1975	Prince of Magic/The Demon Prince	마의태자	Pil Seon	Busan Civic Center	August 16 to 17	
1975	Barefoot in the Park	맨발로공원을	Paul Bratter	Namsan Drama Center	October 9 to 20	
1975	Tae (Lifecord)	태	King Sejo	Namsan Drama Center	November 8 to 16	
1976	Succession a.k.a Mass Game	출세기 (일명 "매스·게임")		Namsan Art Center	June 6 to 16	

=== As part of Dongnang Repertoire World Tour ===
Theater performances as part of Dongrang Repertoire World Tour
Year	Title		Role	Theater	Date	Ref.
Year	English	Korean	Role	Theater	Date	Ref.
1977	Dongnang Repertory Theater Company's World Tour Return Commemorative Performance — Lifecord	동랑레퍼터리극단 해외순회기념공연: 태	Shin Suk-ju	Civic Hall Annex building	February 22–24	
1977	Dongnang Repertory Theater Company's World Tour Return Commemorative Performance — Prince Ha-myeol (Hamlet)	동랑레퍼터리극단 해외순회기념공연: 하멸태자	Crown Prince Hamyeol	tour of 16 cities in 3 countries in the United States, France and the Netherlands	March 9–May 30	
1977	ITI US Headquarters' World Theater Day invitation performance— Prince Ha-myeol (Hamlet)	하멸태자	Crown Prince Hamyeol	ITI US Headquarters Civic Center Annex	June 15–June 20	

=== As member of NTOK ===
Theater play performances as member National Theatre Company of Korea
Year	Title		Role	Theater	Date	Notes/Ref.
Year	English	Korean	Role	Theater	Date	Notes/Ref.
1975	Jingbirok	징비록	Ancestor	National Theater Grand Theater	March 1 to 9	
1975	The Myth of Gorangpo	고랑포의 신화	Dumasusa	National Theater Grand Theater	June 24 to 29	
1975	Wild Field	광야	Seo Kwang-soo	National Theater Grand Theater	August 6 to 11	
1975	Wilhelm Tell	빌헬름 텔	Ludenz	National Theater Grand Theater	November 27 to December 1	
1976	Roar	함성	Lim Byung-chan	National Theater Grand Theatre	Feb 27 to Mar 2	
1976	Sontag Hotel	손탁호텔	Lim Cheol-gyu	National Theater Grand Theatre	June 10 to 13	
1976	Night of January 16th	1월 16일 밤에 생긴 일	juror	National Theater Small Theatre	August 27 to 30	
1976	Peer Gynt	페르귄트	Peer Gynt	National Theater Grand Theatre	September 24 to 28	
1976	A Graveyard Looking Northward	북향묘	Lee Seong-gye	National Theater Grand Theatre	November 25 to 29	
1977	Chorip-dong (Boy with a Straw Hat)	초립동	General Gyebaek	National Theater Grand Theatre	March 2 to 6	
1977	Faust	파우스트	Wagner	National Theater Grand Theatre	June 29 to July 3	
1977	The Late Christoper Bean	크리스토퍼의 죽음	Haget	National Theater Small Theatre	September 15 to 19	
1978	Forest of Massacre	학살의 숲	Ha Myung-ho	National Theater Grand Theatre	November 24 to 28	
1978	Emile Bell	에밀레종	Il-jeon	National Theater Grand Theatre	March 1 to 5	
1978	Look Homeward, Angel: a Story of the buried life	천사여 고향을 보라	Ben	National Theater Small Theatre	April 19 to 28	
1978	Heihe	흑하	Choi Jin-dong	National Theater Grand Theatre	June 21 to 24	
1978	Look Homeward, Angel: Story of the buried life	천사여 고향을 보라	Ben	National Theater Small Theatre	June 30 to July 3	
1978	Splash	물보라	Shin Ki-ri	National Theater Small Theatre	September 15 to 24	ship owner
1978	Splash	물보라	Shin Ki-ri	National Theater Small Theatre	November 8 to 12	
1979	Guest House	객사	Daedal	National Theater Grand Theatre	February 28 to March 4	
1979	Dom Juan	동쥐앙	Snagarelle	National Theater Small Theatre	April 19 to 26	
1979	Becket	베케트	Becket	National Theater Grand Theatre	June 26 to July 2	
1979	Munyeodo (The Portrait of Shaman)	무녀도	villain	National Theater Small Theatre	September 4 to 13	
1979	Sachugi	사추기	Kim Sam-mak	National Theater Small Theatre	December 12 to 18	
1990	Namhansanseong Fortress - The National Tragedy of the Manchu War	남한산성 - 병자호란의 민족적비극	마부대	National Theater Grand Theater	October 21	

=== Theater play with Sanwoollim Small Theater ===
Theater play performances with Sanwoollim Small Theater
Year	Title		Role	Theater	Date	Ref.
Year	English	Korean	Role	Theater	Date	Ref.
1982	Jurassic People	쥬라기(紀)의 사람들	People	Arts Center Grand Theater in Daehak-ro, Seoul	Oct 7–12	
1982	Crime and Punishment	죄와 벌	Raskolnikov	Soongeui Music Hall, Seoul	Dec 13–21	
1984	Chunhyangjeon	춘향전	Byeon Hak-do	Namsan Arts Center Drama Center	October 29 to November 4	
1988	Death of a Salesman	세일즈맨의 죽음	Willy Loman			
1990	Death of a Salesman	세일즈맨의 죽음	Willy Loman	Gumi Culture & Arts Center Grand Performance Hall	February 16 to 17	
1993	Pollack Head	북어대가리	Warehouse keeper Jaang	Seongjwa Small Theater	March 11 to 28	
1994	Waiting for Godot	고도를 기다리며	Vladimir	Sanullim Small Theater		
1994	Stalin		Stalin	Gangnam	June	
1994	Pupa	번데기	Shim Jae-ho	Culture and Art Hall Grand Theater	December 21 to 27	
1997	Civic Theater - 1st Special Feature Approach to Civic Theater, 2nd Special Feature Theater Father, 3rd Special Feature Seoul Metropolitan Theater Foundation	시민연극 - 제1특집 시민연극에로의 접근, 제2특집 연극 아버지, 제3특집 서울시립극단 창단	Han Jeong-soo, father	Sejong Center for the Performing Arts	July 5 to 27	
1997	Hamlet	햄릿	Claudius	National Theater of Korea Grand Theater	April 14 to 20	
1998	A Thousand Years of Death	천년의 수인(囚人)	non-converted long-term jockey	Dongsoong Art Center Dongsoong Hall	May 8 to June 14	
1998	Citizen's Play - Special Feature Korean Ahn Jung-geun	시민연극 - 특집·대한국인 안중근	Ahn Byung p-chan	Sejong Center for the Performing Arts	October 30 to November 4	
1998	Out of the century 2	출세기2	Jeon Moo-sung	Daehangno Culture & Art Center Grand Theater	December 12 to 20	
1999	Tsuka Kouhei special performance <The Hot Sea ~ A Detective from Tokyo>	쯔카 코우헤이 특별공연 <뜨거운 바다~동경에서 온 형사>	Seoul Metropolitan Police Agency former chief detective	Culture and Art Hall Grand Theater	April 16 to 27	
1999	Mr. Toetja and the Giant	툇자 아저씨와 거목		Grand Theater of Literary Society	July 14	
2002	A Streetcar Named Desire	욕망이라는 이름의 전차	Friendship Appearance	Cultural Arts Promotion Agency Arts Theater Grand Theater	July 6 to 17	
2002	Cafe Blue Moon	까페 블루문	Middle-aged director	Cultural Arts Promotion Agency Arts Theater Blue Small Theater	December 17–29	
2004	Cafe Shinpa	카페신파	Park Young-guk	Sanwoolim Small Theater	10.26~11.28	
2005	A Story of Two Knights and the World of Knight Errantry	세상을 편력하는 두 기사 이야기	Knight 2	Arko Arts Theater Small Theater	March 24–April 10	
2005	Death of a Salesman	세일즈맨의 죽음	Willy Loman	Arko Arts Theater Small Theater	March 21–June 1	
2005	Splash	물보라		National Theater of Korea Daloreum Theater	June 9 to 19	
2006	Considerable Family	상당한 가족	Han Jo-seop	Ladder Art Center Samo Theater	17 March	
2006	Ghost	유령	Pastor Manders	Sanullim Small Theater	May 9 to July 2	
2007	I'm sorry for dreaming	꿈 꿔서 미안해	Dokgo	Sanullim Small Theater	October 24 to November 25	
2007	Dragon and Tiger Sangbak	용호상박	Ji Pal-yeong	Namsan Arts Center Drama Center	February 17 to 25	
2007	Death of a Salesman	세일즈맨의 죽음	Willy Loman	Gyeonggi Culture Center	December 28 to 31	
2008	Death of a Salesman	세일즈맨의 죽음	Willy Loman	Nowon Culture and Arts Center	June 18–19	
2008	Death of a Salesman	세일즈맨의 죽음	Willy Loman	Gyeonggi Ansan Arts Center	July 5	
2008	Death of a Salesman	세일즈맨의 죽음	Willy Loman	Uijeongbu Arts Center	July 13	
2009	Happy Jinsa Maeng's House	맹진사댁 경사	Kim Myeong-jeong	Myeongdong Arts Theater in Jung District, Seoul	June 5 to 21	
2010	Even If They Betray You	그대를 속일지라도	Jang Chang-seon	Arko Arts Theater Grand Theater	June 18–27	
2011	2011 Seoul Theater Festival Invitational Performance: Gaze - The night I moved in, I first heard a man's voice	(2011) 서울연극제 기획초청공연: 응시 - 이사 온 날 밤, 처음 남자의 음성을 들었습니다	Jun-tae	Daehakro Arts Theater Grand Theater	05.12–05.15	
2011	Death of a Salesman	세일즈맨의 죽음	Willy Loman	Biseul Hall, Daegu Culture and Arts Center	October 26 to December 9	
2012	Father	아버지	Willy Loman	Cinema Center Sky Yeon Theater	April 6–7	
2012	Father	아버지	Willy Loman	Dongsoong Art Center Dongsoong Hall	April 13–29	
2012	Taehwa River	태화강		Taehwagang Grand Park outdoor performance hall	July 13–14	
2012	Father	아버지	Willy Loman	Lee Haerang Art Theater	September 7–30	
2012	Treasure	보물	Wang Myeong-seong	Seoul Arts Center Jayu Theater	November 8	
2013	Father	아버지	Willy Loman	GS Caltex Yeulmaru	February	
2013	Father	아버지	Willy Loman	Icheon Art Hall	March	
2013	Father	아버지	Willy Loman	Busan Cinema Center Sky Yeon Theater	April	
2013	Father	아버지	Willy Loman	Mapo Art Center Art Hall MAC	May 3–19	
2013	Father	아버지	Willy Loman	Wonju Baegun Art Hall	May 25–26	
2013	Father	아버지	Willy Loman	Hanam Culture and Arts Center Grand Theater (Geomdan Hall)	June 15	
2013	Father	아버지	Willy Loman	Hongju Cultural Center Grand Theater	November 23–24	
2013	Father	아버지	Willy Loman	Sejong Gugakdang in Yeoju	December 1	
2014	Please Look After Mom	엄마를 부탁해	Father	Seoul Arts Center CJ Towol Theater	June 7–29	
2014	Please Look After Mom	엄마를 부탁해	Father	Gimhae Culture Center Maru Hall	July 5–6	
2014	Educating Rita	리타 길들이기	Frank	Vivaldi Park Hall, Building 1, Daemyung Cultural Factory, DCF, Daehak-ro, Seoul	Stepped Down due to health reason.	
2014	Father	아버지	Willy Loman	Gyeongsan Civic Center Grand Hall Daegu	Sep 20	
2014	Father	아버지	Willy Loman	Grand Theater of the Geoje Culture and Arts Center	Sep 27	
2014	Father	아버지	Willy Loman	Buk-gu Culture and Arts Center Ulsan	Oct 11	
2014	Father	아버지	Willy Loman	Jeju Culture and Arts Center	Oct 24–25	
2015	Father	아버지	Willy Loman	Dongyang Arts Theater 2 (formerly Art Center K Samo Theater)	March 1–29	
2015	Father	아버지	Willy Loman	Oriental Arts Theatre 2 (University-ro, Jongno District, Seoul)	May 1–June 27	
2015	Han River Flows	한강은 흐른다	Ensemble	Namsan Arts Center Drama Center	06.18–06.28	
2016	Theatrepolis Odyssey	연극폴리스 오딧세이		Dongsoong Art Center Small Theater	April 8–17	
2016	Hamlet	햄릿	Ghost	National Theater Haeoreum Theater	July 12–August 7	
2018	Death of a Salesman	세일즈맨의 죽음	Willy Loman	Daehakro Arts Theater Grand Theater	Aug 17-26	
2019	Death of a Salesman	세일즈맨의 죽음	Willy Loman	Nowon Culture and Arts Center Grand Theater	February 23	
2021	Considerable Family	상당한가족	Han Jo-seop	Gimcheon Municipal Cultural Center	August 11	
2022	Hamlet	햄릿	Ghost	National Theater Haeoreum Theater	July 13–August 13	

== Awards and nominations ==
Awards and nominations received by Jeon Moo-song
Year	Award	Category	Nominated work	Result	Ref.
1977	New York Obie Awards for	Best Actor	Prince Ha-myeol	Nominated	
1978	1st Theater Critics Awards	Best Actor	Splash	Won	
1980	Theater and Film Arts Awards, hosted by the Hankook Ilbo	Acting Award in the Theater	Jeon Moo-song	Won	
1981	20th Grand Bell Awards	Best New Actor	Mandala	Won	
1981	20th Grand Bell Awards	Best Supporting Actor	Mandala	Won	
1981	2nd Korean Association of Film Critics Awards	Best Actor	Mandala	Won	
1982	Korea Theatre Festival	Best Actor	People of the Jurassic	Won	
1986	22nd Baeksang Arts Awards	Best Theater Actor	Waiting for Godot	Won	
1989	Best Korean Theater Arts Award	Best Play Award	Jeon Moo-song	Won	
2001	3rd KBS Correct Language Award		Jeon Moo-song	Won	
2003	Seoul Institute of the Arts Alumni Association	Light of Life Award	Jeon Moo-song	Won	
2005	15th Lee Hae-rang Prize for Theater	—N/a	—N/a	Won	
2006	42nd Dong-A Theatre Awards	Best Actor	Dragon and Tiger Sangbak	Won	
2017	5th Social Contribution of the Year award from the Korea Family Keeper, an organization commemorating International Women's Day	Social Contribution of the Year award	Jeon Moo-song	Won	
2017	4th Wildflower Film Awards	Appreciation Award	Curtain Call	Won	
2018	8th Beautiful Artist Award	Actor Award Theater	Jeon Moo-song	Won	
2020	65th Korean Academy of Arts Awards	Theater Award	Jeon Moo-song	Won	
