= Princess Hours =

2006 South Korean TV series

- Promotional poster
- Also known as: Goong
- Hangul: 궁
- Hanja: 宮
- Lit.: Palace
- RR: Gung
- MR: Kung
- Genre: Romance; Comedy; Drama
- Based on: Goong by Park So-hee
- Written by: In Eun-a
- Directed by: Hwang In-roi
- Starring: Yoon Eun-hye; Ju Ji-hoon; Kim Jeong-hoon; Song Ji-hyo
- Opening theme: "Palace" by Second Moon
- Ending theme: "Perhaps Love" by HowL and J
- Country of origin: South Korea
- Original language: Korean
- No. of episodes: 24

Production
- Production locations: South Korea; Bangkok, Thailand; Macau, China
- Running time: 60 minutes
- Production company: Eight Peaks

Original release
- Network: MBC
- Release: January 11 – March 30, 2006

Related
- Prince Hours

Princess Hours (Korean: 궁; RR: Gung; lit. 'Palace') is a 2006 South Korean television series, starring Yoon Eun-hye, Ju Ji-hoon, Kim Jeong-hoon and Song Ji-hyo. It is based on Korean manhwa Goong by Park So-hee. It aired on MBC from January 11 to March 30, 2006, on Wednesdays and Thursdays at 21:55 for 24 episodes.

The show was the tenth most popular drama of 2006, with a peak rating of 28.3%. It also became a hit across Asia, contributing to the Korean Wave. Due to its success, a spin-off series, Prince Hours, was broadcast in 2007.

== Synopsis ==
Set in an alternate 21st‑century Korea where the monarchy still exists, the drama follows Crown Prince Lee Shin and his unexpected bride, Chae‑kyeong. When Emperor Lee Hyeon falls gravely ill, the royal family hastens to secure Shin’s succession by arranging his marriage. Though Shin once loved the ambitious ballerina Hyo‑rin, he ultimately weds Chae‑kyeong, a commoner chosen through a pact made by their grandfathers. Initially indifferent to each other, the couple gradually discovers love amid palace intrigue and public scrutiny.

Their relationship is tested by Shin’s lingering feelings for Hyo‑rin, Chae‑kyeong’s struggles with strict etiquette and ridicule, and the return of Shin’s cousin Lee Yul with his mother, Lady Hwa‑young. Once Crown Princess, Hwa‑young schemes to restore her son’s claim to the throne, exploiting scandals and sowing discord. Yul himself grows close to Chae‑kyeong, complicating loyalties further.

As jealousy, misunderstandings, and political machinations mount, Chae‑kyeong matures into a respected Crown Princess, admired for her warmth and sincerity, while Shin learns to balance duty with devotion. The climax arrives when Shin is falsely accused of arson, threatening his succession. Through unwavering loyalty, Chae‑kyeong stands by him, and together they overcome Hwa‑young’s plots and Yul’s rivalry. In the end, Shin is recognized as a worthy heir, and their bond—rooted in both love and duty—emerges stronger than ever, proving that even within the rigid confines of the palace, affection and responsibility can coexist.

== Cast ==
=== Main ===
- Yoon Eun-hye as Shin Chae-kyeong

A normal high school girl, who has an interest in drawing and art. Though seemingly immature, she is kind-hearted and honest. She is betrothed to Crown Prince Lee Shin, who attends the same high school as her, by the late Emperor Seongjo of Korea, who was best friends with her grandfather. Though she was initially annoyed by her seemingly unemotional new husband, Chae-kyeong gradually falls in love with him, not knowing that he harbours similar feelings. She sees Lee Yul as a close friend. At the end of the series, is revealed that Chae-kyeong is pregnant with Lee Shin's heir.

- Ju Ji-hoon as Crown Prince Lee Shin

A smug, indifferent and insensitive man, who is actually lonely on the inside. After getting rejected by his girlfriend Min Hyo-rin, he decides to proceed with his arranged marriage to Shin Chae-kyeong. Though he was initially annoyed by her naivete and enthusiasm, he gradually begins to open his heart to her. He owns a teddy bear called Alfred, the only 'companion' that allows him to let his guard down, and which serves as a focal point throughout the series. He quickly becomes rivals with Prince Lee Yul, who not only fights for the throne but also Chae-kyung's affection.

- Kim Jeong-hoon as Prince Lee Yul

The son of Crown Prince Soo. After his father's death, he was exiled to the United Kingdom with his mother, Lady Hwa-young. After returning to Korea, he fell in love with Shin Chae-kyeong, whom was initially betrothed to him. A kind-hearted and gentle person, Yul was not interested in fighting for the throne. He is best friends with Prince William.

- Song Ji-hyo as Min Hyo-rin

A talented and gifted ballet dancer. She is Shin's girlfriend, but rejected his proposal as she did not wish to give up on her dreams of becoming a star ballerina. When she sees Chae-kyeong and Shin's wedding and how much Chae-kyeong is loved by the people (similar to the rapport of Diana, Princess of Wales), she regrets her hasty decision, and does everything to win Shin back, including engineering a "chance" meeting in Thailand. She ends up hurting herself, driving her to attempted suicide by overdosing on pills. She later recognises that Shin does truly love Chae-kyeong, and ultimately concedes and instead decides to concentrate on her career as a ballerina.

=== Supporting ===
- Kim Hye-ja as the Dowager Empress/"Tae Hoo mama"
- Park Chan-hwan as Emperor Lee Hyeon of Korea
- Shim Hye-jin as Lady Hwa-young

Yul's mother, and the former Crown Princess.

- Yoon Yoo-sun as the Empress Consort/"Wang Hoo mama"
- Lee Yoon-ji as Princess Lee Hye-myung, Shin's older sister
- Kang Nam-gil as Shin Hon, Chae-kyeong's father
- Im Ye-jin as Yi Soon-mei, Chae-kyeong's mother
- Kim Seok as Shin Chae-joon, Chae-kyeong's younger brother
- Yeojin Jeon as Lee Kang-hyun
- Nah Eun-kyeong as Kim Soon-young
- Dan Ji as Yoon Hee-soong
- Choi Seong-joon as Kang-in
- Lee Yong-joo as Jang-kyung
- Uhm Seong-mo as Ryu-hwan
- Lee Ho-jae as Gong Nae-kwan
- Jeon Su-yeon as Choi Sang Gung
- Song Seung-hwan as Emperor
- Kim Sang-joong as Crown Prince Lee Soo, Yul's late father
- Choi Bool-am as Emperor Seongjo, Shin and Yul's late grandfather and father of Crown Prince Lee Soo and Emperor Lee Hyeon.

== Original soundtrack ==
Princess Hours Original Sound Track

Soundtrack album by Various Artists
- Released: May 30, 2007
- Genres: Pop, K-pop, soundtrack, R&B
- Label: Vitamin Entertainment

Disc 1:
No.	Title	Artist	Length
1.	"사랑인가요" (Perhaps Love)	HowL feat. J
2.	"당신은...나는 바보입니다 (Acoustic ver.)" (With You...I'm a Fool)	Stay
3.	"두 가지 말" (Two Words)	Jung Jae-wook feat. The One
4.	"Give Me a Little Try"	Seo Hyun-jin
5.	"난 널 사랑해 너만 사랑해II"	Shim Tae-yoon
6.	"사랑인가요 (Remix ver. 가재발)" (Perhaps Love (Remix ver. 가재발))
7.	"1993 광화 49년"	Various Artists
8.	"宮"	Various Artists
9.	"복장 불량!"	Various Artists
10.	"우주 정복 #1"	Various Artists
11.	"Crystal Flower"	Various Artists
12.	"A Dancing Teddy"	Various Artists
13.	"내가 선택한 길이야!"	Various Artists
14.	"닿지 못한 마음"	Various Artists
15.	"꽃잎이 내린다"	Various Artists
16.	"우주 정복 #2"	Various Artists

Disc 2:
No.	Title	Artist	Length
1.	"사랑에 빠지다" (Falling in Love)	HowL feat. Luna
2.	"그대를 사랑합니다"	Various Artists
3.	"이 노래를 부를게요" (I Would Sing This Song)	Sorea
4.	"Always"	Geon Hwi
5.	"궁 (Piano)" (Palace (Piano))	Second Moon
6.	"바람에 실어" (Blow By Wind)	Sorea
7.	"꽃잎이 내리다 (Piano)"	Second Moon
8.	"너를 보면..."	Words by the Crown Princess
9.	"惡緣"	Second Moon
10.	"내 맘속의 너"	Words by the Crown Prince
11.	"Home"	Second Moon
12.	"닿지 못한 마음 (Acoustic ver.)"	Second Moon
13.	"별처럼..."	Words by the Crown Princess
14.	"말할 수 없어도"	Second Moon

== Ratings ==
Date	Episode	Average audience share (TNS Media Korea)	
Date	Episode	Nationwide	Seoul Area
2006-01-11	1	16.2% (5th)	16.6% (5th)
2006-01-12	2	16.0% (6th)	16.5% (7th)
2006-01-18	3	14.3% (9th)	14.3% (8th)
2006-01-19	4	15.1% (9th)	15.3% (8th)
2006-01-25	5	19.7% (5th)	20.5% (4th)
2006-01-26	6	16.5% (8th)	16.5% (7th)
2006-02-01	7	13.7% (11th)	14.0% (10th)
2006-02-02	8	18.6% (6th)	19.1% (6th)
2006-02-08	9	24.0% (2nd)	25.2% (2nd)
2006-02-09	10	25.2% (2nd)	26.3% (2nd)
2006-02-15	11	24.5% (2nd)	25.7% (2nd)
2006-02-16	12	25.6% (2nd)	27.2% (2nd)
2006-02-22	13	25.0% (2nd)	25.8% (2nd)
2006-02-23	14	26.7% (2nd)	28.4% (2nd)
2006-03-02	15	27.9% (2nd)	28.8% (2nd)
2006-03-02	16	24.3% (3rd)	25.0% (3rd)
2006-03-08	17	25.8% (2nd)	26.1% (2nd)
2006-03-09	18	26.6% (2nd)	27.1% (2nd)
2006-03-15	19	27.0% (2nd)	27.3% (2nd)
2006-03-16	20	27.1% (2nd)	26.9% (2nd)
2006-03-22	21	24.6% (2nd)	25.2% (2nd)
2006-03-23	22	24.4% (2nd)	25.5% (2nd)
2006-03-29	23	25.4% (2nd)	26.9% (2nd)
2006-03-30	24	28.3% (2nd)	28.8% (2nd)
Average		22.6%	23.2%
In the table above, the blue numbers represent the lowest ratings and the red numbers represent the highest ratings.

== Awards ==
- 2006 1st Seoul International Drama Awards: Best Art Director (Min Eon-ok)
- 2006 MBC Drama Awards: Best New Actor (Ju Ji-hoon)
- 2006 MBC Drama Awards: Best New Actress (Yoon Eun-hye)

== International release ==
=== DVD ===
The US DVD release by YA Entertainment uses the title Palace.

== Remakes and spin-offs ==
=== Prince Hours ===
A spin-off series, Goong S or Prince Hours, revolves around a young worker at a Chinese restaurant who suddenly discovers that he is a member of the imperial family and subsequently enters the palace. Hwang mentioned that he would be looking for Shin Chae-kyeong's male counterpart, of sorts. This spinoff has no relation to the first season, and had a new cast and plot.

In October 2006, Korean pop star Se7en was chosen to play the leading role in the spinoff. He will play the character of "Yi Hoo". The rest of the main cast are Huh E-jae (who plays the female protagonist Yang Soon-ae), Kang Doo (who plays Yi Joon), and Park Shin-hye (who plays Shin Sae-ryung). Many of the supporting cast, who played minor characters, reprised their roles. Filming started in November 2006.

The name for the spin-off changed from Goong 2 to Prince Hours – (궁 S) due to copyright infringement problems. Filming continued despite Group 8 facing lawsuits due to the unlawful use of Goong in the title. However, MBC has looked into this issue with Eight Peaks and have stated that the channel station and original production company both own the rights of the name. Goong S will still be used for this season, with the subtitle of "Prince Who". Goong S was broadcast from January 10 to March 15, 2007, to moderate success.

=== Goong: The Musical ===
This drama was later adapted into a musical titled Goong: The Musical (뮤지컬 궁). Producer Song Byung-joon, CEO of production company Group Eight, collaborated with the drama's screenwriter In Eun-ah for the stage rendition, and also brought in theater director Kim Jae-sung. The creative team constructed flamboyant stage sets, which were visualized through digital devices to show off the dramatic effects and fantasies on stage. A variety of music genres from traditional court music, classics, hip-hop and jazz was used, along with varying dance styles such as ballet, court dances and b-boy.

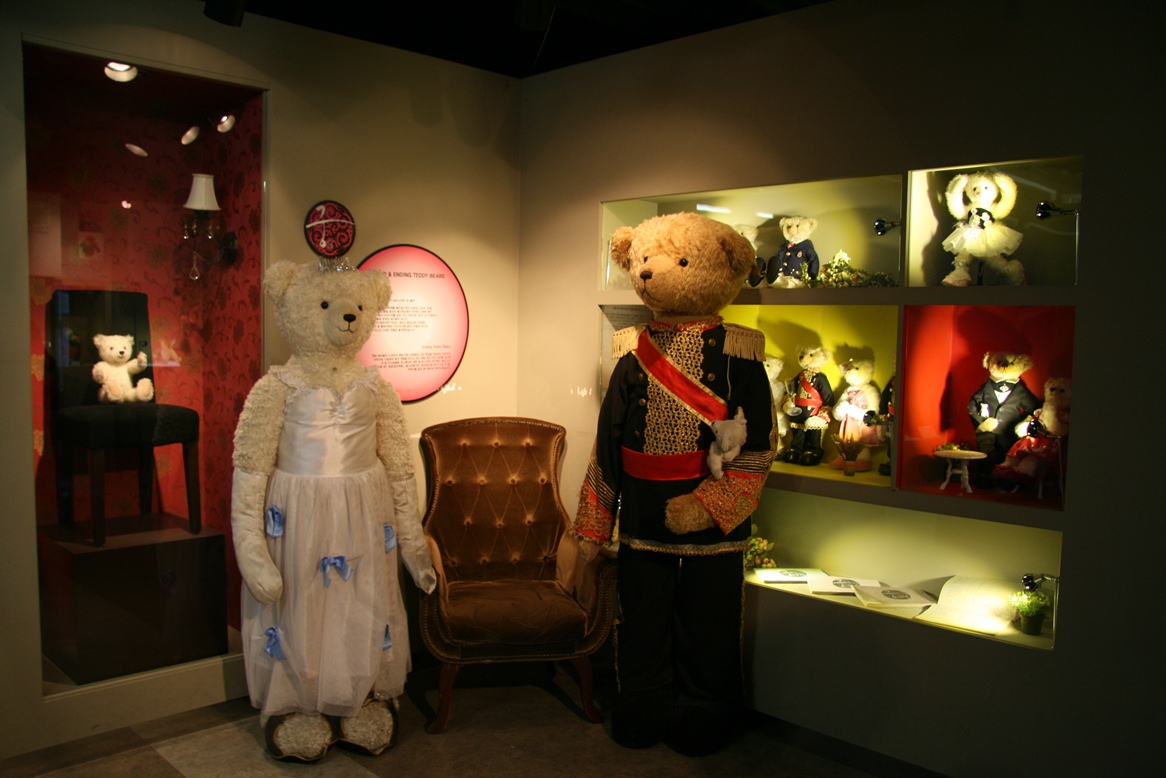
Princess Hours teddy bears display at the Teddy Bear Museum in N Seoul Tower

When the musical debuted at the Yong Theater at the National Museum of Korea in September 2010, the lead role of Crown Prince Lee Shin was played by U-Know Yunho of TVXQ.

Kim Kyu-jong of SS501 played Shin during the musical's run at the Minami-za Kabuki Theater in Kyoto, Japan in June–July 2011, and Kangin of Super Junior alternated with Sungmo of Supernova to take over the role at the Gotanda U-Port Hall in Tokyo, Japan in September 2012.

In 2014, Shinee's Taemin, ZE:A's Kim Dongjun, U-KISS Soohyun and Hoon alternately played the part of Prince Lee Shin in the Japan run of Goong held from May 10 to 24 (25 stages) in Akasaka ACT Theater, Tokyo, Japan.

=== Remakes ===
In 2017, Princess Hours Thailand (Thai title: รักวุ่นๆ เจ้าหญิงจอมจุ้น) is broadcast on True4U. The starring is Ungsumalynn Sirapatsakmetha as Khaning and Sattaphong Phiangphor as Crown Prince Inn.

On March 5, 2021, Group 8 has been announced that the drama will have its second Korean adaptation.

== See also ==
- Korean royalty
- The King: Eternal Monarch - Another Korean tv show that deals with the what-if concept of modern Korean royalty
