= Girlfriends (2009 film) =

- Theatrical poster
- Directed by: Kang Suk-bum
- Written by: Noh Hye-young; Lee Ji-chang
- Based on: Girlfriends by Lee Hong
- Produced by: Hwang Pil-seon; Seo Jeong
- Starring: Kang Hye-jung; Han Chae-young; Huh E-jae; Bae Soo-bin
- Cinematography: Kim Jun-young
- Edited by: Kyung Min-ho
- Music by: Bang Jun-seok
- Distributed by: Next Entertainment World (South Korea); Mirovision (International)
- Release date: December 17, 2009
- Running time: 114 minutes
- Country: South Korea
- Language: Korean
- Box office: (admissions: 107,946)

Girlfriends (Korean: 걸프렌즈) is a 2009 South Korean romantic comedy film starring Kang Hye-jung, Han Chae-young, Huh E-jae and Bae Soo-bin.

It is based on the 2007 chick lit novel of the same title by Lee Hong, which won the 31st Writer of Today Award.

== Plot ==
29-year-old Song-yi (Kang Hye-jung) starts dating her handsome co-worker Jin-ho (Bae Soo-bin). But when she suspects Jin-ho might be cheating on her, she sets out to meet the "other woman," only to learn that he has not one, but two, other "girlfriends": Jin (Han Chae-young), Jin-ho's first love, is a sexy and successful party planner, while Bo-ra (Huh E-jae) is a fearless, young college student. On one hand, Song-yi wants to keep Jin-ho all to herself, but strangely enough, she grows close to the two other women and their similar taste in men becomes the basis of a great friendship and a passionate, incestuous love affair.

== Cast ==
- Kang Hye-jung as Song-yi
- Han Chae-young as Jin
- Huh E-jae as Bo-ra
- Bae Soo-bin as Jin-ho
- Jo Eun-ji as Hyun-joo
- Kim Hye-ok as Mom
- Hong Gyo-jin as Representative Park
- Jung In-hwa as Team leader Jung
- Kim Joon-young as real doctor
- Shin Dae-seung as man at intersection
- Hwang Hyun-seo as woman at intersection
- Kim Bo-min as yoga instructor
- Kim Yong-woon as action man 1
- Han Dae-ryong as action man 2
- Kwak Jin-seok as action man 3
- Choi Gyo-sik as rice store owner
- 2NE1 as club party guests (cameo)
- Oh Dal-su as voice doctor (cameo)
- Choi Song-hyun as Soo-kyung (cameo)
- Lee Ho-seong as Dad (cameo)
- Kim Kwang-kyu as department head (cameo)
- Ji Dae-han as taxi driver (cameo)
- Gong Jung-hwan as Mikael (cameo)
- Hwang Hyeon-hee as Jae-hoon (cameo)
- Son Jeong-min as mistress (cameo)
- Park Sung-woong as Jin's husband (cameo)
- Son Ho-young as club party guest Yoo Myeong-nam (cameo)
