= Single Dad in Love =

- Promotional poster
- Also known as: Single Papa in Love; Single Daddy in Love
- Written by: Oh Sang-hee
- Directed by: Moon Bo-hyun
- Starring: Oh Ji-ho; Heo Yi-jae; Kang Sung-yeon
- Music by: Gaemi
- Country of origin: South Korea
- No. of episodes: 16

Production
- Executive producer: Bae Kyung-soo
- Producers: Kwak Jung-hwan; Ji Byung-hyun
- Running time: 60 minutes Mondays and Tuesdays at 21:55 (KST)
- Production companies: RaemongRaein Co. Ltd. SidusHQ

Original release
- Network: KBS2
- Release: February 18 – April 8, 2008

Single Dad in Love (Korean: 싱글파파는 열애중; RR: Singgeulpapaneun yeoraejung) is a 2008 South Korean television series starring Oh Ji-ho, Heo Yi-jae and Kang Sung-yeon. It aired on KBS2 from February 18 to April 8, 2008 on Mondays and Tuesdays at 21:55 for 16 episodes.

== Plot ==
Kang Poong-ho is a pest exterminator by day and a K-1/mixed martial arts fighter by night. He is a single father raising his 7-year-old son Kang San after the boy's mother, his first love Yoon So-yi, abandoned them to pursue her ambition of becoming a pianist. Despite life's trials, Poong-ho never loses his optimism and sense of humor.

He meets and falls in love with Jeon Ha-ri, a bright and bubbly medical student from a wealthy family. An obstacle to their romance arises when they learn that Ha-ri's soon-to-be stepmother is none other So-yi and that it was Ha-ri's surgeon father Jeon Ki-suk who sponsored her piano studies abroad. As So-yi re-enters their lives, San is diagnosed with a brain tumor. Poong-ho is willing to go to any lengths to save his beloved son.

== Cast ==
=== Main characters ===
- Oh Ji-ho as Kang Poong-ho
- Heo Yi-jae as Jeon Ha-ri
- Kang Sung-yeon as Yoon So-yi
- Park Chan-hwan as Jeon Ki-suk
- Ahn Do-gyu as Kang San

=== Supporting characters ===
- Im Joo-hwan as Min Hyun-ki
- Shindong as Oh Chil-goo
- Kim Ha-eun as Jo Kyung-ah, Ha-ri's friend
- Lee Doo-il as Goo Sang-tae, Poong-ho's boxing coach
- Min Wook as Min Joon-ho, principal
- Kim Ja-ok as Jung Eun-ji, Hyun-ki' mother
- Jang Ji-min as Park Min-joo
- Jung Jae-soon as Lee Wal-soon, Min-joo's grandmother
