= Song So-hee =

South Korean singer

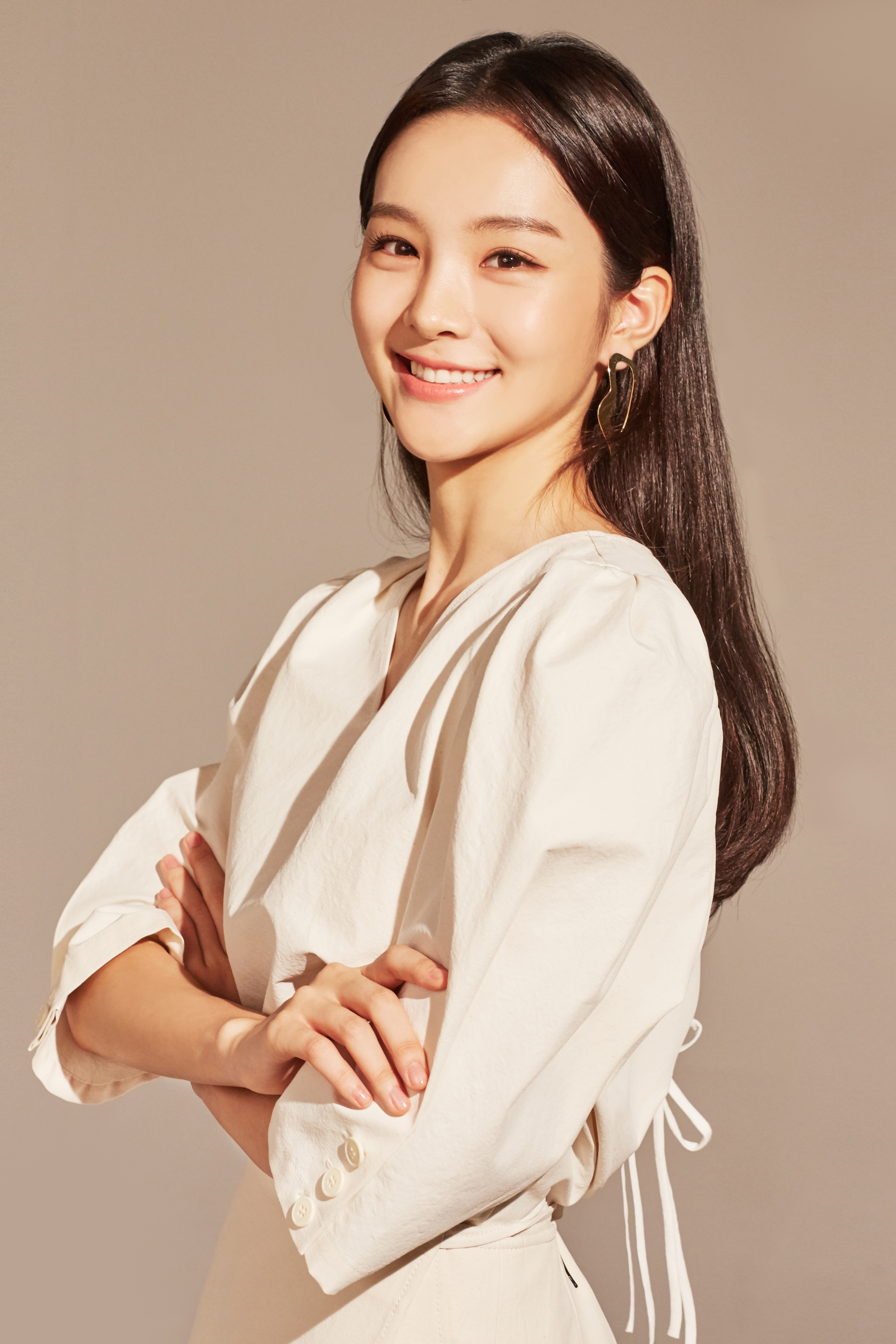
- Song in 2019

Background information
- Born: 20 October 1997 (age 29); Yesan, Chungcheongnam-do, South Korea
- Genres: Gyeonggi minyo; Gugak; traditional fusion
- Occupation: Singer
- Instruments: Vocals; percussion; guitar
- Years active: 2002—present
- Label: Authentic
- Website: Official website

Korean name
- Hangul: 송소희
- RR: Song Sohui
- MR: Song Sohŭi

Song So-hee (Korean: 송소희; born 20 October 1997), widely known as the "Traditional Music Girl" (국악소녀), is a South Korean Gyeonggi minyo (경기민요) or traditional folk singer. She rose to fame after winning the KBS National Singing Contest in 2008 at the age of 11, earning her a reputation as a gugak prodigy. The South Korean government honored Song with the title "Best Korean of the Year" in 2010.

== Early life and education ==
Song was born in Yesan, Chungcheongnam-do on 20 October 1997. She is the eldest daughter of Song Geun-yeong and Yang Bok-rye. She has one younger sister, Song So-yeong.

Song displayed her talent for music at a very young age, which she later attributed to her father's habit of singing minyo, a genre of Korean folk songs, to her. When she was five years old, her parents enrolled her in a gugak academy to develop her singing skills. She studied under Gyeonggi folk singers Park Seok-sun and Lee Ho-yeon, the latter of whom is classified as a "Living National Treasure" by the South Korean government. She learned to play traditional Korean percussion instruments under samul nori master Lee Gwang-su.

Song attended Deoksan Elementary School, Imseong Middle School, and Hoseo High School, all in Chungcheongnam-do. In 2016, she enrolled in Dankook University's School of Music to study traditional music.

== Career ==
Song became famous nationwide after she performed "Changbu Taryeong" at the 2008 KBS National Singing Contest. Her performance left a deep impression upon the viewers. She won the grand prize in the contest and became the youngest grand prize winner in the 29 years of the contest's history.

Since then she performed on several popular Korean TV programs such as Star King, KBS Open Concert, and Yoondohyun's Love Letter. She sang songs such as "Changbu Taryeong", "Taepyongga", "Arirang", "Batnori", "Gunbam Taryeong", and "Battuiwara" on these programs and became more famous.

Her appearance on Star King in 2008 led her to another important training opportunity from Master Lee Ho-yeon, who is a specialist in Gyeonggi minyo. Having been impressed by So-hee's talent, Master Lee volunteered to provide training for her on a regular basis. Minyo (Korean folk song) literally means "song of folklore" and is the traditional music sung most frequently by Koreans. Minyo is broadly classified into five styles according to region: Gyeonggi, Namdo, Seodo, Dongbu and Jeju Minyo. Gyeonggi Minyo is traditionally popular in the central area around Seoul.

"She was born with a gift for singing Minyo. She has high-pitched voice tone and it's a clear, ringing voice (which is essential for singing minyo). She also has an extraordinary sense of pitch which enables her to learn new songs with ease. Also, her Bangulmok, a singing technique of Korean traditional music is exquisite"

Since 2008, she has been invited to perform at various events, both at home and abroad. Her main domestic events are Celebration of the 60th anniversary of the Republic of Korea in 2008, Baekje International Cultural Festival in 2010, Jeonju International Sori Festival in 2010, and Public Broadcasters International Seoul Meeting in 2011.

Song's popularity rapidly spread around the world due to her online videos and also the online replay services of South Korean TV programs she performed at, allowing people around the world to watch her performances. Many of them were stunned by her performances and fell in love with her and minyo.

Such international recognition provided her with opportunities to perform abroad. Since 2009, she has been invited to perform at official events and a variety of culture exchange events in various countries including Japan, Russia, and the United States. Some of those are the Korea-Japan Culture Exchange in 2009, the celebration of the twentieth anniversary of the establishment of diplomatic relations between Korea and Russia in 2010, the Korean Festival in 2011, and the opening events of the Korean Cultural Center India in 2012. In 2010, the government chose her as "Best Korean of the Year", a yearly award for someone who has graced and enriched the nation.

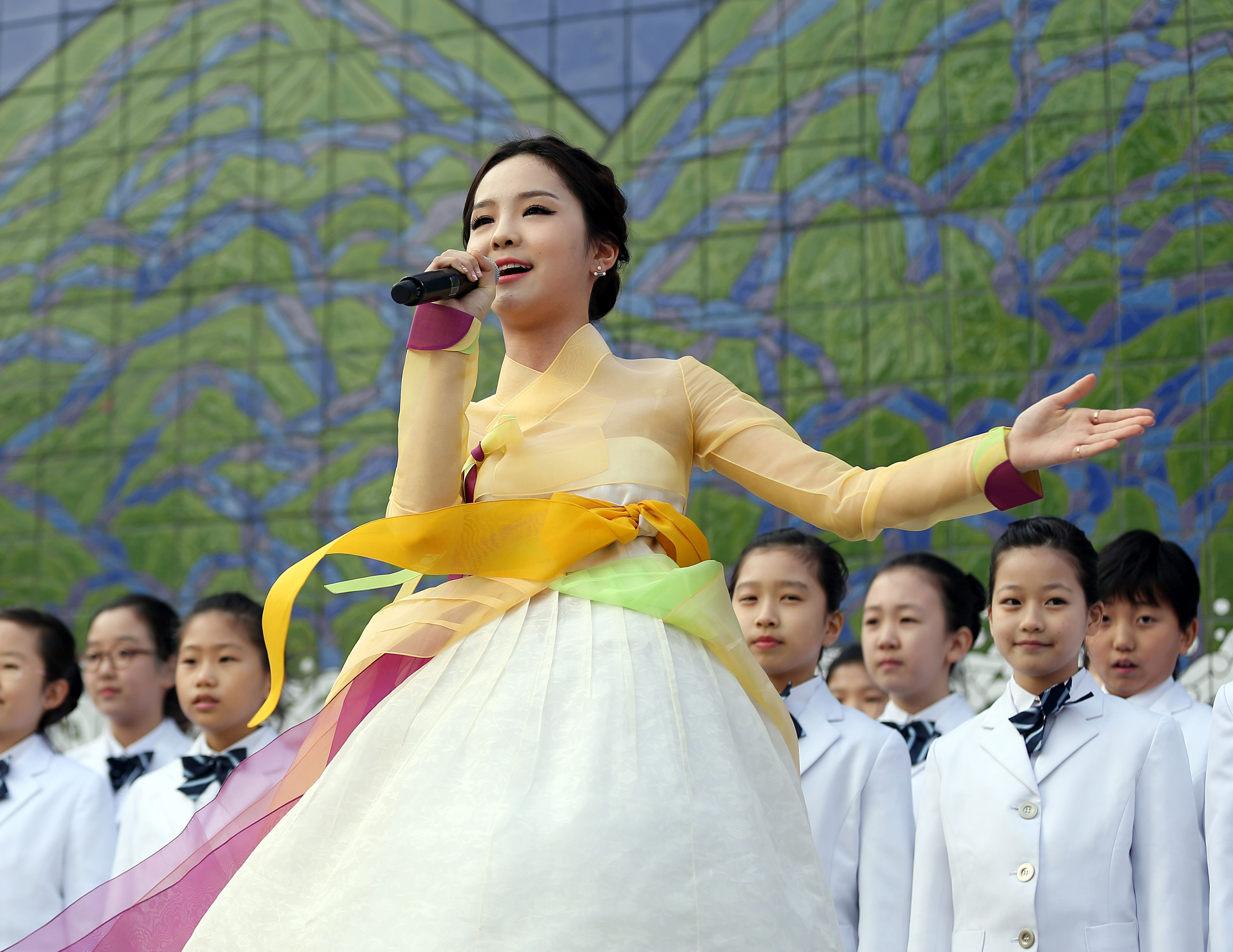
Song performing Arirang in 2014

In 2014, Song sang "Arirang" at the closing ceremony of the Sochi Winter Paralympics on 10 March, and also won first place on the 26 July installment of "Immortal Song 2".

In 2014, she prematurely terminated her exclusive contract with Deokin Media following the sexual assault of a fellow singer under the label by the CEO's brother. The following lawsuit for breach of contract concluded after 6 years in 2019, setting a legal precedent for entertainers terminating their contracts ahead of time.

After signing with Warner Music Korea, Song So-hee has released two mini-albums and one single: 2015's New Song, 2016's "Love, Seasons" single, and 2018's Modern Folk Songs (a collaboration with traditional fusion band Second Moon).

She signed an exclusive contract with Magic Strawberry Sound in 2022 and released the single album Journey to Utopia in 2022 and the single Infodemics in collaboration with Jambinai's Lee Ilwoo in 2023.

On December 31, 2025, Song left Magic Strawberry Sound, after the end of her contract with the label.

== Discography ==
=== Extended plays ===
Title	EP details	Peak chart positions	Sales
Title	EP details	KOR	Sales
New Song	Released: 23 April 2015; Label: SH Foundation, Warner Music Korea; Formats: CD, digital download, streaming	8	KOR: 1,461
Modern Minyo (모던민요) (with Second Moon)	Released: 21 March 2018; Label: SH Foundation, Warner Music Korea; Formats: CD, digital download, streaming	65	—N/a
GangGangSullae	Released: 4 April 2024; Label: Magic Strawberry Sound; Formats: digital download, streaming	—	—N/a
Re:5	Released: 21 October 2025; Label: Magic Strawberry Sound; Formats: CD, digital download, streaming	—	—N/a

=== Singles ===
Title	Details	Peak chart positions
Title	Details	KOR
"Love, Seasons"	Released: 25 July 2016; Label: SH Foundation, Warner Music Korea; Formats: Digital download, streaming	—
"Odolttogi" (with Second Moon)	Released: 24 December 2017; Label: SH Foundation, Warner Music Korea; Formats: Digital download, streaming	—
"Arirari"	Released: 18 November 2019; Label: SH Foundation, Warner Music Korea; Formats: Digital download, streaming	—
"Miryang Arirang: A Precious Flower"	Released: 12 December 2019; Label: SH Foundation, Miryang Cultural Foundation; Formats: Digital download, streaming	—
"Moon Halo"	Released: 29 February 2020; Label: SH Foundation, Warner Music Korea; Formats: Digital download, streaming	—
"My Country, Korea"	Released: 6 June 2021; Label: SH Foundation, Warner Music Korea; Formats: Digital download, streaming	—
"구름곶 여행 : Journey to Utopia"	Released: 25 November 2023; Label: Magic Strawberry Sound, Kakao Entertainment; Formats: Digital download, streaming	—
"Infodemics"	With: Ilwoo Lee from Jambinai; Released: 27 May 2023; Label: Magic Strawberry Sound, Kakao Entertainment; Formats: Digital download, streaming	—
"Asurajang"	Released: 9 October 2023; Label: Magic Strawberry Sound, Kakao Entertainment; Formats: Digital download, streaming	—
"Not a Dream"	Released: 21 March 2025; Label: Magic Strawberry Sound, Kakao Entertainment; Formats: Digital download, streaming	146
"Dreamy walk (The Haunted Palace : Original Television Soundtrack)"	Released: 30 May 2025; Label: Magic Strawberry Sound, Kakao Entertainment; Formats: digital download, streaming	—
"SUZUME"	Released: 28 August 2025; Label: Magic Strawberry Sound; Formats: Digital download, streaming	—

=== Compilation appearances ===
Title	Album details	Peak chart positions	Sales
Title	Album details	KOR	Sales
Immortal Songs: Singing the Legend - Jo Young-nam (Part 1) as lead & title track artist	Released: 26 July 2014; Label: KBS Media, LOEN Entertainment; Formats: CD, digital download	98	KOR: 18,289

== Filmography ==
=== Variety shows ===
Date	Show	Episode	Notes	Song
15 February 2010	Golden Oldies	1163	Lunar New Year Special	"Binari"
16 August 2010	Golden Oldies	1184	Arirang Special	"Gangwon-do Arirang"
20 September 2010	Golden Oldies	1189	Hangawi Special	"Roasted Chestnuts & Changbu Taryeong"
25 October 2010	Golden Oldies	1194	Golden Oldies 25th anniversary Special	"Nulilririya"
3 January 2011	Golden Oldies	1203	Happy New Year	"Song of Peace"
7 March 2011	Golden Oldies	1212	Spring Welcome	"Nodeul Riverside"
17 October 2011	Golden Oldies	1244	Favorite Songs 3	"Camellia Girl"
16 September 2013	Golden Oldies	1340	Hangawi Special	"Harvest Song & Song of Peace"
7 October 2013	Golden Oldies	1343	Mokpo Song Festival Special	"A Boatman's Song"
1 March 2014	Immortal Songs: Singing the Legend	142	Independence Movement Day Special	"Arirang Alone" (Hong Kyung-min feat. Song So-hee)
26 July 2014 2 August 2014	Immortal Songs: Singing the Legend	158-159	Jo Young-nam	"I Can't Live Without Love"
1 September 2014	Golden Oldies	1383	Songs of my Heart	"Song of Youth"
13 September 2014 20 September 2014	Immortal Songs: Singing the Legend	165-166	Saturday NightHeat	"Tomorrow"
21 February 2015	Immortal Songs: Singing the Legend	187	Traditional Folk Songs	"A Boatman's Song"
25 April 2015	Immortal Songs: Singing the Legend	196	Seo Yoo-seok	"Sky"
11 July 2015 18 July 2015	Immortal Songs: Singing the Legend	207-208	Goo Chang-mo	"Lost"
3 October 2015	Immortal Songs: Singing the Legend	219	Jo Su-mi	"If I Leave"
4 January 2016	Golden Oldies	1448	Wishes for the New Year	"Arirang Alone"
16 April 2016	Immortal Songs: Singing the Legend	247	Lyricist Kim Dong-chan	"Love and Seasons"
28 May 2016	Immortal Songs: Singing the Legend	253	Composer Baek Yeong-ho	"Haeundae Elegy"
3 September 2016	Immortal Songs: Singing the Legend	267	Drama Soundtrack Special	"Onara & I Can't Say Goodbye"
15 October 2016	Immortal Songs: Singing the Legend	273	Arirang Special	"Gangwon-do Arirang"
25 February 2017	Immortal Songs: Singing the Legend	292	Songwriter Choi Jong-hyeok	"This is Goodbye" (with Ko Youngyeol)
9 September 2017	Immortal Songs: Singing the Legend	320	Songwriter Kim Ki-pyo	"Seoul Woman" (With Ko Young-yeol)
16 December 2017	Immortal Songs: Singing the Legend	333	Songwriter Shin Jung-hyeon	"I Will Forget You"
3 March 2018	Immortal Songs: Singing The Legend	344	KBS 45th Anniversary Special	"You Say It's Over" (with Ko Young-yeol)
24 March 2018	Immortal Songs: Singing The Legend	347	Legendary Songs In Textbooks	"Face" (with Second Moon)
12 April 2018	All That Music	295		"Face" (with Second Moon)
25 August 2018	Immortal Songs: Singing The Legend	368	Gayo Stage Special	"Tearful Dooman River"
23 March 2019	Immortal Songs: Singing The Legend	397	Cheong Tae Choon & Park Eun Ohk	"Garden Balsam"
11 May 2019	Immortal Songs: Singing The Legend	403	Han Dong Jun & Yurisangja	"Only You" (with Son Tae-Jin)
4 January 2020	Immortal Songs: Singing The Legend	437	New Year Special	"In the Wilderness" (with Ahn Ye-Eun)
29 February 2020	Immortal Songs: Singing The Legend	445	Jung Su-ra	"Have You Seen My Love"
20 March 2020	All That Music	378		"Magic Lily" (with Ahn Ye-Eun)
13 June 2020	Immortal Songs: Singing The Legend	460	20th Anniversary of the June 15th North–South Joint Declaration, Here Comes Peace	"As I Live & Song of Peace"
24 October 2020	Immortal Songs: Singing The Legend	479	2020 Korean Traditional Music Special	"Pollack"
14 November 2020	Immortal Songs: Singing The Legend	482	BTS X Pdogg Special	"Spring Day"
2 August 2021	Chosun Pop, Drop the Beat	2		"Odolttogi & Gangwon-do Arirang" (with Second Moon)
4 September 2021	Immortal Songs: Singing The Legend	521	Jeon In-kwon	"Everyday With You"
30 January 2022	Thank You Everyone, Song Hae	N/A	Commemorative musical for Singer and Television host Song Hae	"Odolttogi"
11 November 2022	Music Bank			"Journey to Utopia"
4 March 2023	Immortal Songs: Singing The Legend	596	KBS 50th Anniversary Special	"Monggempo Taryeong & Journey to Utopia"

=== Television shows ===
Year	Title	Role	Notes	Ref.
5 May 2018	Knowing Bros	Guest	National Talent Show	
2021–present	Chosun Pop Drop the Beat	Host		
2021–2022	Goal Girl	Cast Member	Season 2	
4 April 2025	The Seasons: Cantabile of Park Bo Gum	Guest	Episode 4	

== Ambassadorship ==
- Korean hanbok ambassador (2022)
