= Heo Yi-jae =

South Korean actress (born 1987)

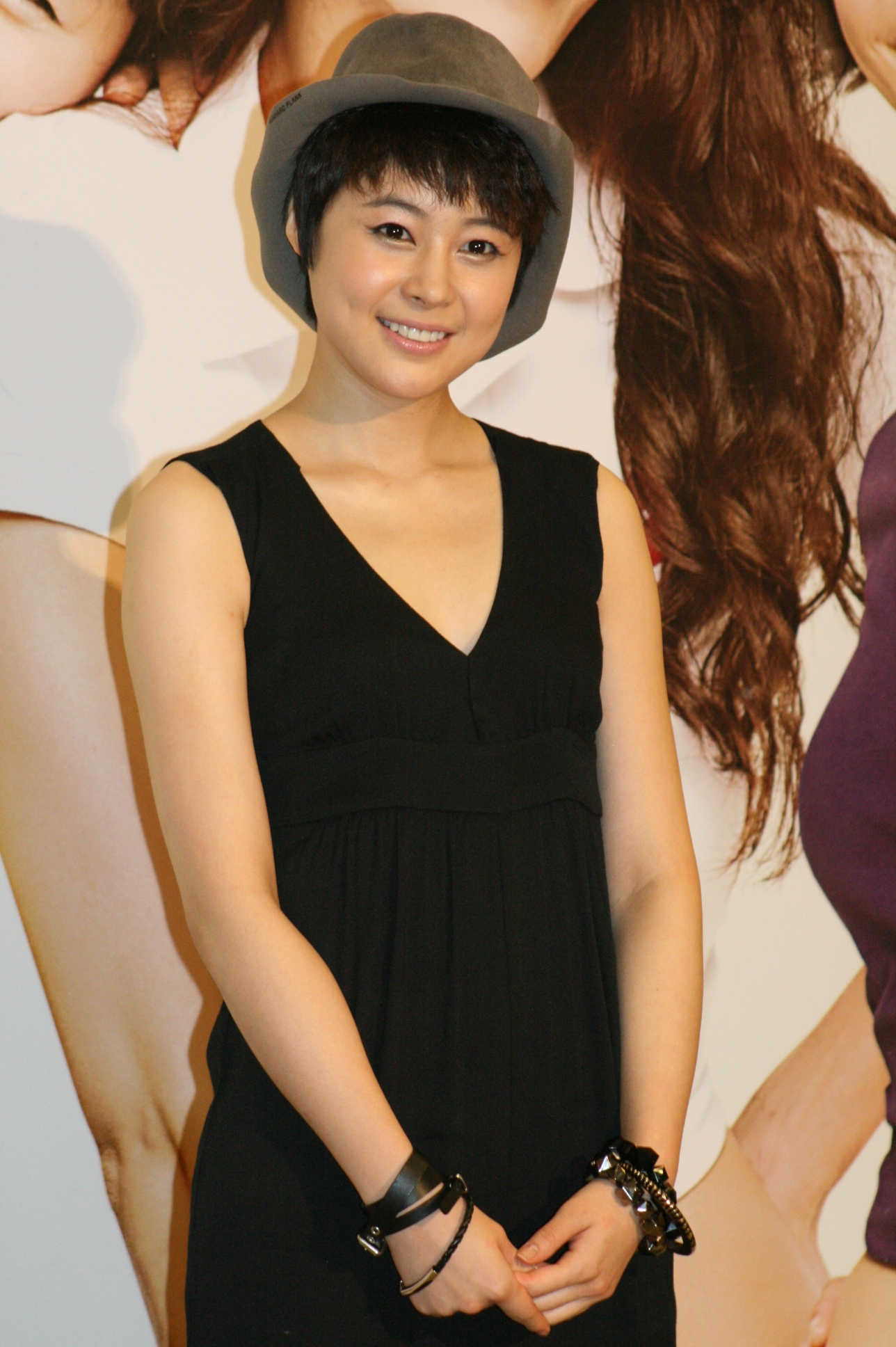
- Heo in 2009
- Born: 19 February 1987 (age 39); Seoul, South Korea
- Other name: Huh E-jae
- Education: Dongguk University - Theater and Film
- Occupation: Actress
- Years active: 2000–2009; 2016
- Agent: Wind Entertainment
- Spouse: Lee Seung-woo (m. 2011; div. 2015)

Korean name
- Hangul: 허이재
- Hanja: 許怡才
- RR: Heo Ijae
- MR: Hŏ Ijae

Heo Yi-jae (Korean: 허이재, born February 19, 1987) is a South Korean actress. She is best known for her leading roles in the television dramas Prince Hours and Single Dad in Love.

== Career ==
Heo Yi-jae began her entertainment career by modeling for magazines when she was a high school student. After making her acting debut in 2004, she was given the nickname "Little Kim Tae-hee" due to her resemblance to the popular actress. She first appeared in several sitcoms on KBS followed by supporting roles, notably as Kim Rae-won's love interest in the 2006 gangster film Sunflower.

In 2007, she got her big break when she was cast in the female leading role in Prince Hours (also known as Goong S). She and Seven played childhood best friends whose lives are changed when he turns out to be a member of the Korean royal family. Unlike its predecessor Princess Hours, Goong S received low ratings. But it made her into a household name, and that year, she won recognition at Andre Kim's Best Star Awards and the Premiere Rising Star Awards (held during the PIFF).

An indie film she shot in 2006, A Boy Who is Walking in the Sky (the early working title was Da Capo), was released in 2008. She played the protagonist, a tomboy who helps a mute eight-year-old boy (played by Kang San) find the mother who abandoned him.

She then starred opposite Oh Ji-ho in Single Dad in Love, where she played a medical student from a wealthy family who falls for a single father who makes a living as a K-1/mixed martial arts fighter. That same year, she became a host/MC for Inkigayo; she and co-host Eun Ji-won hosted the music program from May 11 to November 30, 2008.

In 2009, she left her agency, Bae Yong-joon's BOF (Boundaries of Forest), and transferred to YG Entertainment. She then joined the Telecinema project, seven Korea-Japan joint productions that both received a limited theater release and were broadcast on television (SBS in South Korea, and TV Asahi in Japan). In 19-Nineteen, Heo, T.O.P and Seungri played nineteen-year-old teenagers who become fugitives from the law after being falsely accused of murder.

Later that year, she was also one of the lead stars of the romantic comedy film Girlfriends, in which her college student character shares a boyfriend with Kang Hye-jung and Han Chae-young, but all three women nevertheless become friends.

== Personal life ==
She married businessman Lee Seung-woo on January 15, 2011. She didn't renew her contract with YG Entertainment, and announced that she was putting her career activities on hold while transitioning to married life. The couple divorced in 2015, after which she decided to return to acting.

== Filmography ==
=== Film ===
- A Dirty Carnival (2006)
- Sunflower (2006)
- Da Capo (2008)
- 19-Nineteen (2009)
- Girlfriends (2009)
- Woo-joo's Christmas (2016)

=== Television drama ===
- Sharp 1 (KBS2, 2004)
- Dal-rae's House (KBS2, 2004)
- Bang Bang (KBS2, 2004)
- Smile Again (SBS, 2006)
- Prince Hours (MBC, 2007)
- Single Dad in Love (KBS2, 2008)
- You Are a Gift (SBS, 2016)

=== Variety show ===
- Inkigayo (Popular Song) (SBS, 2008)

=== Music video appearances ===
- Seo Taiji — "Live Wire" (2004)
- Maya — "Hard Liquor" (2006)
- Maya — "Road to Myself" (2006)
- The Way — "Love.. It's Painful" (2007)

== Awards ==
- 2007 3rd Premiere Rising Star Awards: Best New Actress
- 2007 3rd Andre Kim Best Star Awards: New Star Award
