= Little Prince (2008 film) =

- Film poster
- Hangul: 어린 왕자
- RR: Eorin wangja
- MR: Ŏrin wangja
- Directed by: Choi Jong-hyun
- Written by: Lim Jin-pyeong
- Based on: The Little Prince by Antoine de Saint-Exupéry
- Produced by: Lee Se-hyeong
- Starring: Tak Jae-hoon; Kang Soo-han
- Cinematography: Kim Hong-min
- Edited by: Gwon Gi-suk
- Music by: Lee Jae-jin
- Release date: January 17, 2008
- Running time: 92 minutes
- Country: South Korea
- Language: Korean

Little Prince (Korean: 어린 왕자) is a 2008 South Korean drama film. Directed by first-time director Choi Jong-hyun, it is loosely inspired by French writer Antoine de Saint-Exupéry's most famous novella The Little Prince.

== Cast ==
- Tak Jae-hoon as Han Jong-cheol
- Kang Soo-han as Yeong-woong
- Jo An as Seon-ok
- Park Won-sang as Yong Joon-soo
- Shin Dong-mi as Eun Hee-soo
- Lee Ho-jae as Han Jeong-tae
- Lee Yong-yi as Superintendent Catholic sister
- Jeon Moo-song as Han Jong-cheol's father-in-law
- Jung Yoon-seok as Han Eun-kyu
