= Second Moon =

South Korean ethnic fusion band

- Origin: South Korea
- Genres: Jazz, folk, world music
- Years active: 2004–present
- Website: second MOON

Second Moon (Korean: 두번째 달; RR: Dubeonjjae Dal) is a South Korean ethnic fusion band that has performed in several folk music festivals around the world. It achieved mainstream recognition by creating music for popular television shows like Princess Hours (2006), Love in the Moonlight (2016), and The Legend of the Blue Sea (2016).

== Beginnings ==
Second Moon was founded by commercial and film music producers Kim Hyun-bo and Park Jin-woo in 2004.

== Discography ==
=== Studio albums ===
Title	Album details	Peak chart positions	Sales
Title	Album details	KOR	Sales
2nd Moon	Released: February 17, 2005; Label: Triangle; Formats: CD, cassette	—	—N/a
What Have You Been Doing? (그동안 뭐하고 지냈니?)	Released: February 24, 2015; Label: Stone Music Entertainment; Formats: CD, digital download	17	KOR: 703
Pansori Chunhyangga (판소리 춘향가)	Released: April 21, 2016; Label: Monday Brunch; Formats: CD, digital download	—	—N/a
Modern Minyo (모던민요) with Song So-hee	Released: March 21, 2018; Label: SH Foundation; Formats: CD, digital download	65	—N/a
Paldoyuram (팔도유람)	Released: August 1, 2019; Label: 2nd Moon; Formats: CD, digital download	—	—N/a
