= Kang Doo =

South Korean singer and actor

- Born: Song Yong-Shik; February 27, 1979 (age 47)
- Genres: K-pop; pop
- Occupations: Singer; actor
- Instrument: Bass guitar
- Formerly of: The Jadu

Kang Doo (born February 27, 1979) is a South Korean singer and actor. He is a former member of the group, The Jadu. He played the bass guitar and did backup vocals. Kang Doo is now replaced with a new member, Maru. He gave up his position for achieving his goal to become actor.

== Acting career ==
Kang Doo starred in the third season of MBC's popular sitcom Hello Franceska. He also acted in MBC's Prince Hours as Lee Joon, however the series were not successful. In Goong S, he did not receive many positive comments from the viewers. This was his first time to act in major broadcasting program. Later, he revealed that it was quite hard to bear in mind the criticisms.

== Filmography ==
- Legal High (JTBC, 2019)
- My Only One (KBS2, 2018)
- It's My Life (KBS1, 2018)
- Ms. Perfect (KBS2, 2017)
- Late Night Restaurant (SBS, 2015) guest, episode 3
- Full House Take 2 (SBS Plus, 2012)
- Queen of Reversals (2010, MBC)
- Drama Special Series: Rock, Rock, Rock (KBS2, 2010)
- Playful Kiss (MBC, 2010)
- Prince Hours (MBC, 2007)
- Hometown over the Hill (KBS1, 2007)
- Look Back with a Smile (KBS2, 2006)
- Hello Franceska 3 (MBC, 2005)
