= O Taeseok =

South Korean playwright and director (1940–2022)

- Born: 11 October 1940; Seocheon, Korea, Empire of Japan
- Died: 28 November 2022 (aged 82)
- Writing career
- Language: Korean

Korean name
- Hangul: 오태석
- Hanja: 吳泰錫
- RR: O Taeseok
- MR: O T'aesŏk

O Taeseok (Korean: 오태석; 11 October 1940 – 28 November 2022) was a South Korean playwright, theatre director and translator.

== Biography ==
O Taeseok was born on 11 October 1940, in Seocheon, Korea, Empire of Japan (now in South Korea). O Taeseok was ten years old when the Korean War began, causing his childhood to be torn apart. His father, a politician, was kidnapped, causing O Taeseok, along with his grandmother, to become a refugee, where he witnessed countless deaths. O Taeseok later received a degree in philosophy from Yonsei University in 1963, and immediately threw himself into writing and directing.

O died on 28 November 2022, at the age of 82.

== Work ==
O Taeseok is most well-known as a theatre director and playwright who is extremely adept at portraying Korean life and state of mind. O Taeseok's plays have many elements in common with traditional Korean plays. On stage the characters of his plays do not carry on static, realistic conversations, but rather engage in vibrant song and dance or wear animal masks while dashing about on stage; exaggerated movements and make-up are also frequently used. Despite the loud, raucous atmosphere on stage, O Taeseok's work depicts the darkness of pain and the shadows of death. The story behind this lies in his childhood memories.

O Taeseok made his formal literary debut with his play Wedding Dress (웨딩드레스), which was recognized at the 1967 New Years Literary Arts Competition sponsored by The Chosun Ilbo, and Change of Season (환절기), which won a prize in a 1968 open playwriting competition co-sponsored by the National Theatre and the Kyunghyang Daily News. In 1968 and 1969 his plays Change of Season (환절기), Judas, Before the Rooster Crows (유다여, 닭이 울기 전에), Outing (교행), and Self-Righting Doll on Roller Skates (롤러스케이트를 타는 오뚜기) were performed in several avant-garde theatres. He next took up residence with the Dongnang Repertory Company (동랑 레퍼토리 극단), where he directed Lubeu (루브), and continued to direct and write.

== Works in translation ==
- Warum das Mädchen Sim-Tscheong zweimal ins Wasser ging (심청이는 왜 인당수에 몸을 두 번 던졌는가)
- The Metacultural Theater of Oh T'ae-Sŏk: Five Plays from the Korean Avant-Garde (University of Hawaiʻi Press, 1999), translated by Kim Ah-Jeong and Robert B. Graves ISBN 978-0-824-82099-2

== Works in Korean (partial) ==
=== Plays ===
- Wedding Dress (웨딩드레스)
- Grass Burial (초분)
- Lifecord (태)
- Chunpung's Wife (춘풍의 처)
- Splash (물보라)
- Between Father and Son (부자유친)
- Bicycle (자전거)
- Dream of a Lowly Man (필부의 꿈)
- Greenhouse (비닐하우스)
- Change of Season (환절기)
- Judas, Before the Rooster Crows (유다여, 닭이 울기 전에)
- Outing (교행)
- Self-Righting Doll on Roller Skates (롤러스케이트를 타는 오뚜기)
- Africa (아프리카)
- Why Did Sim Cheong Throw Herself into the Indangsu Twice? (심청이는 왜 인당수에 몸을 두 번 던졌는가)

=== Stories ===
- Unhappy Times (불행한 시간, 1962)

=== Translations ===
- Leaf Storm (낙엽, 1955)
- No One Writes to the Colonel (아무도 대령에게 편지하지 않다, 1956)
- Big Mama's Funeral (마마 그란데의 장례식, 1962)
- One Hundred Years of Solitude (백년 동안의 고독, 1967)
- The Incredible and Sad Tale of Innocent Eréndira and Her Heartless Grandmother (순박한 에렌디라와 포악한 할머니의 믿을 수 없이 슬픈 이야기, 1972)
- The Autumn of the Patriarch (족장의 가을, 1975)
- Chronicle of a Death Foretold (예고된 죽음의 이야기, 1981)
- Love in the Time of Cholera (콜레라 시대의 사랑, 1985)
- The General in His Labyrinth (미로 속의 장군, 1989)
- Of Love and Other Demons (사랑과 다른 악마들, 1994)
- News of a Kidnapping (어느 납치 소식, 1996)

== Awards ==
- Hankook Ilbo Theater and Film Prize (한국연극화상) in 1973 (for Grass Burial)
- Seoul Theatre Festival Grand Prize (연극제 대상) in 1987
- Ho-Am Prize in the Arts in 2005 (with Bucheon Philharmonic Orchestra)
