= Chakra (album) =

Studio album by Chakra
- Released: October 11, 2002
- Recorded: 2002
- Genre: K-pop, dance
- Language: Korean
- Label: Cream Records; Zam Entertainment; Kiss Entertainment

Chakra chronology
Chakra'ca (2001)	Chakra (2002)	Tomato (2003)

Chakra is the self-titled third studio album of the South Korean girl group Chakra. The singles were "Come Back" and "Da".

== Background and development ==
Chakra had gained popularity through their Indian-inspired music and powerful image. With Chakra 3, the group's third album, the group turned to a more emotional and feminine concept, as in their lead single "Come Back". Prior to the album's release, the members of Chakra had been pursuing careers outside of the group. Jung Ryeo-won acted in the television drama Saxophone, Eun worked as a video jockey for a KMTV music program, and Hwangbo appeared as a panelist in various variety shows. In order to promote the album, the members halted individual activities and united as a group. The members also helped in producing the album—along with their usual producer, Lee Sang-min, they supervised the song-selecting process and picked out the tracklist themselves. Upon hearing "Come Back", the members decided it to be the album's lead single.

During production, Eani quit Chakra due to education issues in the United States. She was replaced with Bona, who was chosen through an audition, and the album was re-recorded with Bona's vocals.

== Composition ==
Chakra's lead single, "Come Back", is a ballad, one of two included in the album. The medium tempo song features a string section backed by a 24-person orchestra, as well as violin by Eugene Park. Actor Kwon Sang-woo also provided the song's narration. The members chose "Come Back" as the lead single to "shake off the perception that dance singers can't sing". The music video for "Come Back" was filmed at the Hard Rock Beach Hotel in Pattaya, and was sponsored by the Tourism Authority of Thailand. "Da", described by the Chosun Ilbo as a "Chakra-style dance track," is a fusion of Indian instruments and percussion with K-pop melodies. Other tracks include the pop ballad "I Love You", the techno track "Four Beauties", and the disco number "If".

== Track listing ==
1. Dorawa (돌아와)
2. Da (다)
3. I'll Be Alright (Gihoe) (기회)
4. If
5. Minyeo Sachongsa (미녀 사총사)
6. Jipchak (집착)
7. Garasadae (가라사대)
8. Geudaereul Saranghamnida (그대를 사랑합니다)
9. Mong (몽)
10. Love Fool
11. Yeokjeon (Hurry Up Now) (역전)
12. Wind
