= Come A Come =

Studio album by Chakra
- Released: March 2, 2000
- Recorded: 1999
- Genres: K-pop, dance
- Length: 42:45
- Language: Korean
- Labels: Cream Records; Zam Entertainment; Kiss Entertainment

Chakra chronology
Come A Come (2000)	Ringing Gingle Bells (2000)

Come A Come is the debut studio album of the South Korean girl group Chakra. The singles in this album were "Come a Come", "Sign of Love", and "Hey U".

== Background ==
In 1999, Hwangbo and Eani were part of the project group Bros, another Lee Sang-min production, and participated under the group's name. Chakra—then consisting of Hwangbo, Eani (Im Seon-hong), Lee Hyeon-ju, and Hong Bo-ra—had joined Bros while preparing to debut. Under the helm of Chakra were 6 prominent artists: Kim Jung-man shot the album cover, Hong Jong-ho directed the group's music video, Lee Jeong-woo styled their clothing, Lee Kyeong-min took charge of their makeup, Chae Ri-na directed the choreography, and Lee Sang-min produced the album.

== Composition ==
Come A Come predominantly focuses on a fusion sound, sampling elements from traditional Indian music along with reggae sounds. The album opens with "The New", an intro track that introduces Chakra and their members. Lee Sang-min, the album's producer, narrated the song, which Korean webzine Weiv described as mixing African-style rhythms and raps with Indian instruments. The following song and the album's title track, "Han (Come A Come)", is a goa trance song that employs the Korean cultural sentiment of han in its lyrics, depicting "a woman's longing for her man as he leaves her turning into han". It fuses traditional Indian instruments with modern electronic music, with an intro containing narration in Indian. "Sign of Love", a song about the feelings experienced as one goes about loving, combines dance-pop with industrial influences. The fourth track, "Why", is a breakup song with elements of hip-hop and R&B and a "Latinesque melody". Following it is "Make a Love", which is a techno song about "spreading love beautifully". Hip-hop group X-Large features on "Fantasy", a disco number that samples "Hot Stuff" by Donna Summer. "Champion" mixes reggae melodies with traditional African music and delivers a message of self-empowerment to those who have lost love. "Resolution", a collaboration between nine instrumentalists, is a fusion of genres such as jazz, bossa nova, and Indian music, while "Hey U" combines dance, rap and Latin music. "Sign of Separation" serves as a companion to "Sign of Love", and portrays the aftermath of a breakup. The Dong-a Ilbo described it as "a hip-hop song about a teenage girl's puppy love". The final track, "Origin", is a duet between Jung Ryeo-won and X-Large's Danny Ohm, and depicts separated lovers who wish to unite.

== Release ==
Come A Come was released on March 2, 2000, under Cream Records. The group's first performance was on February 26, 2000, on the MBC music show Music Camp. The album accumulated more than 40,000 pre-orders, selling over 150,000 copies by April 2000. Come A Come peaked at number 6 on the Recording Industry Association of Korea albums chart in March 2000. On the year-end chart, Come A Come placed 55th, with 162,251 copies sold.

== Track listing ==
1. The New
2. Come a Come (한)
3. Sign of Love (사랑징후)
4. Why (feat. Danny Ohm)
5. Make a Love
6. Fantasy (feat. X-Large)
7. Champion
8. Resolution (결심)
9. Hey U (feat. Danny Ohm)
10. Sign of Separation (이별징후)
11. Origin (Duet By Ryeo Won And Danny Ohm) (기원)
