= Ringing Gingle Bells =

Studio album by Chakra
- Released: December 6, 2000
- Recorded: 2000
- Genre: K-pop, dance, Christmas
- Language: Korean
- Label: Cream Records, Zam Entertainment, Kiss Entertainment

Chakra chronology
| Come A Come (2000) | Ringing Gingle Bells (2000) | Chakra'ca (2001) |

Ringing Gingle Bells was the Christmas album of the Korean girl group Chakra. The single of the album was "Lonely Christmas", with a music video accompanying it. The album sold about 100,000 copies.

== Track listing ==
1. Lonely Christmas
2. Syangjerie Naerin Chukbok (샹제리에 내린 축복)
3. Rudolph Saseumko (루돌프 사슴코)
4. Goyohan Bam (고요한 밤)
5. Christmas Sirijeu (시리즈)
6. Santa Claus Is Coming to Town
7. Chakra X-mas
8. Amazing Grace
9. Feliz Navidad
10. Seokbyeorui Jeong (석별의 정)
11. Dwitbukchineun Sonyeon (뒷북치는 소년)
12. Hey U (Remix) (리믹스)
13. Yeonjugok (연주곡)
