= Dong-joo =

- Hangul: 동주
- RR: Dongju
- MR: Tongju

Dong-joo, also spelled Dong-ju, is a Korean given name.

People with this name include:

- Yun Dong-ju (1917–1945), Korean poet
- Kim Dong-joo (born 1976), South Korean baseball player

Fictional characters with this name include:

- Han Dong-joo, in 2004 South Korean television series Stained Glass
- Park Dong-joo, in 2010 South Korean television series My Girlfriend Is a Nine-Tailed Fox
- Cha Dong-joo, in 2011 South Korean television series Listen to My Heart
- Han Dong-joo, in 2011 South Korean television series Paradise Ranch
- Kang Dong-joo, in 2012 South Korean film Never Ending Story
- Park Dong-joo, in 2014 South Korean television series Angel Eyes
- Dong Dong-joo, in 2019 South Korean television series The Tale of Nokdu

== See also ==
- List of Korean given names
