= May It Please the Court =

2022 South Korean Disney+ series

- Promotional poster
- Hangul: 변론을 시작하겠습니다
- Lit.: Let Me Start the Argument
- RR: Byeolloneul sijakhagetseumnida
- MR: Pyŏllonŭl sijakhagessŭmnida
- Genre: Legal drama; Mystery
- Developed by: Kang Bo-young (planning)
- Written by: Kim Dan
- Directed by: Kang Min-goo
- Starring: Jung Ryeo-won; Lee Kyu-hyung; Jung Jin-young; Kim Hye-eun
- Music by: Dae-bin
- Country of origin: South Korea
- Original language: Korean
- No. of episodes: 12

Production
- Executive producers: Han Hye-yeon; Kim Na-hyeon
- Producer: Ahn Chang-hyun
- Production companies: Arc Media; Slingshot Studio

Original release
- Network: Disney+ (International); Hulu (United States)
- Release: September 21 – October 26, 2022

May It Please the Court (Korean: 변론을 시작하겠습니다) is a South Korean television series directed by Kang Min-goo and starring Jung Ryeo-won, Lee Kyu-hyung, Jung Jin-young, and Kim Hye-eun. It was released on all Disney Streaming services on September 21, 2022, including Hulu in United States and Star by Disney+ in selected regions. This drama is an adaptation of the book "Let Me Start the Argument" by Jeong Hye-jin, a lawyer who specializes in public defenders and has been defending the socially disadvantaged, and features vivid stories of real-life cases from the book.

== Synopsis ==
Noh Chak-Hee, a brilliant but ruthless corporate lawyer, is the adopted "granddaughter" of the founder of Seoul's most prominent law firm. Just as she is about to receive a promotion to partner after successfully defending a pharmaceutical company for manufacturing harmful birth control pills, the police arrest her for manipulating a woman who had taken the pills into attempting suicide. She is suspended by her firm for a year and is forced to take a job working as a member of the Seoul public defender's office.

As a public defender, she shares an office with Jwa Si-Baek, a top graduate from the Judicial Research and Training Institute. Instead of becoming a judge, prosecutor, or attorney at a big law firm, he chose to work in the least profitable and least respected legal profession: public defender. He is enthusiastic with his work but also hides a mysterious part of his personal life that nobody knows about. Noh Chak-Hee and Jwa Si-Baek don't get along very well, but a serial murder case brings them together, and as they try to solve the case more secrets unfold, and they grow to trust each other.

== Cast ==
- Jung Ryeo-won as Noh Chak-hee, an ace lawyer with the highest winning rate in a big law firm, Jangsan, who becomes a public defender.
- Lee Kyu-hyung as Jwa Si-baek, a public defender often referred to as crazy and eccentric.
  - Yoon Seo-bin as young Jwa Si-beak
- Jung Jin-young as Jang Ki-do, CEO of Jangsan Law Firm.
- Kim Hye-eun as Oh Ha-ran, wife of Jang Ki-do.
- Lee Sang-hee as Yoo Gyeong-jin, a detective at the Metropolitan Crime Investigation Unit.
- Kim Sang-ho as Shin Chi-sik, owner of Mokgol Dumplings.
- Park So-jin as Jang Yi-yeon, daughter of Jang Ki-do.
- Hong Seo-joon as Oh Dae-hyeon, a strategist who helps and supports Jang Ki-do's ambitions.
- Ko Kyu-pil as Do Young-soo, a clerk at the office of a public lawyer.
- Park Jung-hak as Yoon Seok-goo, CEO of Ilshin Electric.
- Ryu Seong-hyun as Cho Hyun-sik, CEO of Kang Sung Pharmaceutical.
- Noh Sang-bo as Kang Sang-man, a prosecutor who often fights with Noh Chak-hee in court.
- Jung Min-seong as Han Dal-jae, a character who is confused because of the loss of his past memories as an employee of Mokgol Dumplings.
- Min Seong-wook as Park Byeong-jae, A journalist with a history of being sued two years ago for spreading false information.
- Kim So-yi as Choi Yun-jeong, who has schizophrenia.
- Jeon Moo-song as Jang Byung-chun, Jang Ki-do's father and chairman/patriarch of Jangsan Law Firm. Chak-hee is a favorite of his.
- Kim Ju-yeon as Lee Soon-young (cameo)

== Production ==
In December 2021, Jung Ryeo-won was offered the role of lawyer Noh Chak-hee in the series. Her agency H& Entertainment informed that she was considering it positively. This series marks her comeback after three years, since she last appeared in 2019 TV series Diary of a Prosecutor. The series directed by Kang Min-goo and written by Kim Dan, is produced by Arc Media and Slingshot Studio.

Principal photography began on January 22, 2022 and filming was wrapped up on June 15, 2022.
