= Chakra'ca =

2001 album by Chakra

Studio album by Chakra
- Released: March 7, 2001
- Recorded: 2000–2001
- Genres: K-pop, dance
- Language: Korean
- Labels: Cream Records; Zam Entertainment; Kiss Entertainment

Chakra chronology
Ringing Gingle Bells (2000)	Chakra'ca (2001)	Chakra (2002)

Chakra'ca is the second studio album of the South Korean girl group Chakra. The singles were End, No and Oh my boy. They won Best Dressed Singer Award for End. The album sold about 160,000 copies.

== Track listing ==
1. CHAKRA'CA (Intro)
2. Kkeut (END) (끝)
3. Aniya (No) (아니야)
4. Sarangiyeo (Besame Mucho) (사랑이여 (베사메무초))
5. Yong Gi (용 기)
6. Dance Queen
7. Nae Neukkim! (My Feeling) (내 느낌!)
8. Han Beonman Deo (한 번만 더)
9. Oh! My Boy
10. Geudaeramyeon... (Bireoyo) (그대라면... (빌어요))
11. Juyeoneun Neowa Na (주연은 너와 나)
12. Urideurui Iyagi (우리들의 이야기)
