= Kim Ju-yeon =

South Korean actress (born 1993)

- 김주연
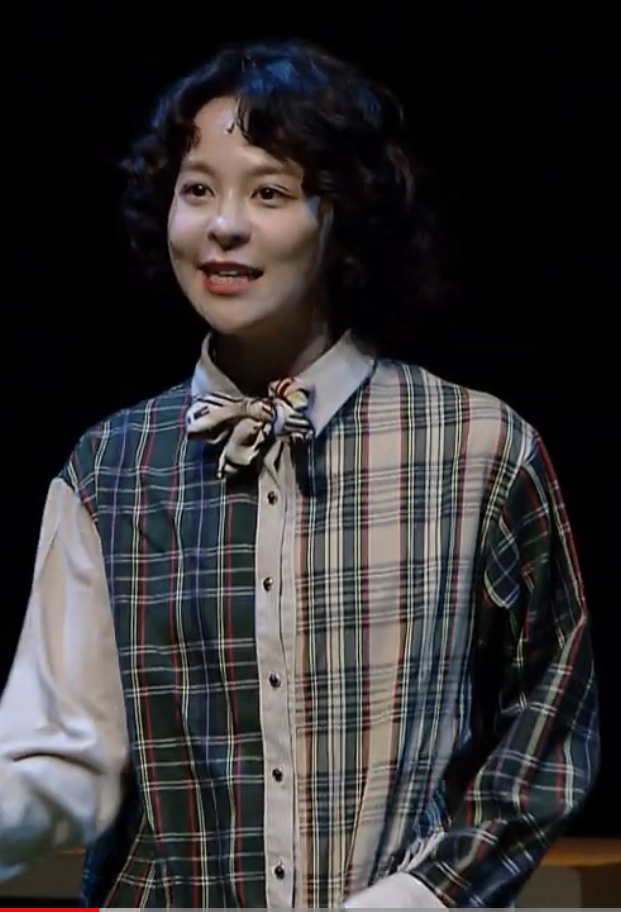
- Kim in 2021
- Born: May 11, 1993 (age 33); Jeju Province, South Korea
- Education: Anyang Art High School; Department of Theater and Film of Dongguk University
- Occupation: Actress
- Years active: 2015–present
- Agent: Big Boss Entertainment
- Known for: Move to Heaven; Hometown Cha-Cha-Cha

Korean name
- Hangul: 김주연
- RR: Gim Juyeon
- MR: Kim Chuyŏn

Kim Ju-yeon (Korean: 김주연; born May 11, 1993) is a South Korean musical, stage and television actress. She is best known for her role in Netflix original series Move to Heaven (2021) and Hometown Cha-Cha-Cha (2021).

== Early years ==
Kim Ju-yeon was born on May 11, 1993, in Jeju Province, South Korea, the youngest of three daughters. Growing up in Jeju, she had limited exposure to theater or musical performances. Her life path shifted when she met art teacher Ko Seong-woo during her third-grade year of elementary school. Kim played a male role in her school's team for the national folk song competition, and their performance won the grand prize. This experience significantly contributed to gradually transforming her shy personality.

Kim developed a keen interest in music after becoming a fan of the indie band Jaurim. She began taking singing lessons from a former professor at Seoul Institute of The Arts. Based on the professor's recommendation, she enrolled at Anyang Arts High School, where she became a member of the school's musical club. Her first acting experience was participating in the school's production of the musical Beauty and The Beast. After completing high school, Kim relocated to Seoul and pursued a degree in the Department of Theater and Film at Dongguk University.

== Career ==
=== Debut and early careers ===
Kim's career beginnings can be attributed to her student-mentor relationship with producer Kim Soo-ro, who was her acting professor at Dongguk University. In the autumn of 2015, Kim debuted as a theater actress, playing Yoo Hwa-yi, the female lead in Jang Jin's play Taxi Driver. This 12th production of Taxi Driver was a collaboration between Jang Jin and producer Kim Soo-ro as part of Kim Soo-ro's Project. Subsequently, Kim became a member of Double K Film and Theater agency, which was established by Kim Soo-ro and Kim Min-jong.

In 2016, Kim debuted as a musical actress in Interview, double-cast as Joan, an 18-year-old who had suffered a mysterious accident, alongside Moon Jin-ah. The musical, produced by Kim Soo-ro, then curator of Hyundai Card Understage, unraveled a decade-old murder case, with the story shifting between past and present through interviews. Also in 2016, Kim expanded her acting repertoire by joining the cast of the Korean creative musical Peste, based on Albert Camus' novel The Plague (La Peste). The musical ran from August to October at the LG Arts Center, where Kim took on the role of Jan. Peste generated anticipation, featuring music by Seo Taiji and arrangement by Kim Seong-su.

Throughout 2017, Kim remained active in her acting career. She reprised her role as Joan for a special performance of Interview in Tokyo, Japan. Additionally, she portrayed Natasha in the Korean adaptation of Maxim Gorky's classic play The Lower Depths. Her visual and acting interpretation added tension and a fresh twist to the character, earning her the nickname 'Daehak-ro Kim Tae-hee' for her stage presence. Later that year, from June to October, Kim played the supporting role of Seon in an encore performance of the musical The Great Catsby, adapted from a popular webtoon by Kang Do-ha. The musical's creative team, including dramaturge Oh Se-hyuk, director Byun Jeong-ju, music director Huh Su-hyun, and choreographer Kwon Young-im, contributed to the production's success.

Kim's breakthrough came in 2018 when she starred in the 20th production of the musical Laundry, portraying Son Na-young. Premiered in 2005, the musical depicts the hardships faced by ordinary people through the story of Son Na-young, a bookstore clerk, and Solongo, a Mongolian migrant worker. Later that year, Kim joined the principal cast of the musical Maybe Happy Ending as the helperbot Claire for an encore performance in Japan. She was double-cast alongside actress Song Sang-eun, who had previously performed in the Japanese premiere. Kim also shared the stage with Yesung, Seven, and Seong-je, who were triple-cast as helperbot Oliver. Additionally, Kim Nam-ho and Ra-jun were double-cast as Oliver's former owner, James. The production took place in Yokohama and Osaka in May. Kim's final project for the year was her portrayal of Emily in Disappear Into Thin Air (2018), the Korean adaptation of Disappearance, a play by Japanese playwright and director Keralino Sandorovich. It was produced by Yeonwoo Stage.

=== Temple and other theater projects ===
In early 2019, Kim portrayed Mary Warren in the Korean adaptation of Arthur Miller's play The Crucible (1953) at the Lee Haerang Theatre of Art Seoul. Her agency, Double K Film and Theater, produced the show. Kim also took on the role of Chae Kyung in Hot Summer (2019), a Theater Ganda production, where she was double-cast with Hong Ji-hee. The musical ran at the Yes24 Stage 3 Hall from May 17 to June 30, 2019.

Later that year, Kim secured the lead role in the period musical Create-ing 2nd Work: Nangrang Kisaeng, produced by Jeongdong Theater. The musical was inspired by the true story of Kang Hyang-ran (姜香蘭), Joseon's first short-haired kisaeng. Kang enrolled at Hannam Kwonbeon at age 14, becoming one of the most popular kisaengs due to her exceptional skills. In her quest to attend school, Kang cut her hair short and disguised herself as a man in a suit. Her secret's revelation caused a scandal, making headlines on the third page of the Dong-A Ilbo on June 22, 1922. Directed by Kang Yu-mi, the musical ran at Jeongdong Theater from July 26 to August 18, 2019.

"While playing the role of Temple, I came to realize that I had prejudices against people with autism. I believe this was largely due to the fact that I had not been around many autistic individuals before. However, my attitude changed after I spent several months studying autism in preparation for the show. Once I removed my own prejudices about autism, I was able to portray the character more accurately. I hope that this work will help to dispel prejudices and misconceptions about autism."

— Kim on Temple (2021)

Kim's notable performance of the year was in the physical play Temple by Theater Ganda, where she portrayed Temple Grandin. The play's plot was based on the true story of Temple Grandin, an autistic professor at Colorado State University who achieved success as a zoologist. Kim shared the role of Temple with actress Park Hee-jung, having been recommended by assistant director Shim Sae-in, with whom she had worked on Hot Summer. To prepare, Kim conducted extensive research, reading Temple Grandin's book The Story of a Certain Autistic Man and drawing inspiration from Cho Seung-woo in the film Marathon and Kim Hyang-gi in Innocent Witness. The play premiered at the Goyang Cultural Foundation in 2019.

Kim later returned to Theater Ganda productions, taking on the role of Ann in the Korean premiere of the musical Murderer (2019). This work, based on Georg Kaiser's play The Raft of Medusa, was performed from September 20 to November 17 at Daehangno TOM 2.

Kim's year of 2020 was full with various acting projects. From January to March, Kim portrayed Julie, an eccentric weaver who swallowed a magnet, in composer Kim Dae-ri's musical Julie & Paul (2020), produced by Yeonwoo Stage. Following that, from March to April, Kim played the dual roles of Demian and Sinclair in the musical Demian (2020), based on the novel by Hermann Hesse. This two-hander musical play employed a gender-blind casting concept, where one male and one female actor alternated playing Sinclair or Demian, also portraying other novel characters like Cromer, Sinclair's father, Pistorius, and Mrs. Eva. From June to September, Kim and Lee Ah-jin alternated playing the supporting role of Layla, a bold and clever character, in the play Dear Elena (2020). Written in 1980 by Ljudmila Razumovskaya, the play explores humanity's inner conflicts.

In October and November, Kim reprised her role as Temple Grandin in the movement play Temple for Welcome Daehakro-Welcome Theater 2020. Critics noted her growth as an actor, observing a dramatic change in her acting style compared to earlier works like Julie & Paul and Demian.nIn December, Kim joined Dream Theater Company's play Touch Your Love, written and directed by Jung Hyung-seok. The play, which premiered in Daehak-ro in fall 2013, tells the story of three characters—Dong-wook, Eun-ju, and Yoon-hee—who carry emotional wounds caused by love and people. In the 6th encore performance, Kim and Lee Seo-kyung were double-cast as the female lead, Eun-ju, a character known for her clear subjectivity and free-spirited personality.

=== 2021 to present: screen roles and recent stage works ===
From December 2020 to February 2021, Kim portrayed Jin Se-hee in the play What's Your Macbeef? by Shin So-won, which was b on Richard McBeef by Seung-Hui Cho. Kim had previously participated in a full-length reading of the play on June 21, 2019, when it was selected for the 2019 Juda Creative Contest. What's Your Macbeef? is set in an international high school's theater class, where teacher Jeong Dong-woo and three students, Jin Yoo, Lee Ji-soo, and Jin Se-hee, prepare for a performance under their homeroom teacher Yoon Young-jun's recommendation. Kim, Seo Hye-won, and Yoo Yu-jin were triple-cast as Jin Se-hee. Directed by Kim Ji-ho, What's Your Macbeef? premiered at the Dream Art Center Hall 3 in Seoul.

In January 2021, Kim was cast as Yun Shim-deok, Joseon's first soprano, in the play Government Ferry, directed by Lee Ki-bum for Player Sang Sang, Steps. Set on the Tokujumaru government ferry from Japan to Busan, the play posits that Yun Shim-deok is still alive. Hong Seok-ju, hiding on the boat, saves Yun Shim-deok when she jumps into the sea, leading to their relationship. The play depicts their conflicts in living different lives but also highlights their understanding, shared friendships, and shared hopes. Government Ferry was performed at the Jayu Theater in Daehangno, Seoul.

Kim made her first television appearance in a minor role in the OCN drama series Watcher in 2019. In 2021, she had three credited television appearances, all in supporting roles: Jin Ha-young in the miniseries Do Do Sol Sol La La Sol and a nurse in Youth of May, both aired on KBS2. Kim also made a cameo as Han Geu-ra's mom in the Netflix Original Series Move to Heaven. Her first major supporting television role was in tvN drama Hometown Cha-Cha-Cha (2021), where she portrayed Ham Yung-kyung, a pregnant young mother who runs a mini-mart named after her daughter Bora. Kim acted alongside her Temple co-star Yoon Seok-hyun, who played her husband, Choi Geum-chul. In the same year, Kim confirmed her appearance in her debut film, Jochiwon Commentary, produced by Blue Cucumber and directed by Choi Yang-hyun. The film is inspired by Shakespeare's Hamlet, one of his four great tragedies, and incorporates Korean sentiment and Chungcheong Province dialect to maximize the tragedy.

Kim made a theater comeback as Emma in the musical Vampire Arthur (2021–2022) at the Black Theater, Chungmu Art Center in Seoul. Set in 1930s London, the musical tells the story of the growth and love between a vampire named Arthur and Emma, an illiterate girl from a poor background. Directed by Kim Dong-yeon, the show ran from November 9, 2021, to February 6, 2022. For a recent replay of Vampire Arthur, a new creative team, consisting of writer Park Hae-rim and music director Choi Hee-young, joined as screenwriter and music director, respectively. Vampire Arthur was originally created by writer Seo Hwi-won and composer Kim De-ri. It premiered in 2017 through the 'Black and Blue Season 4' story writer's debut program. The showcase took place on March 23–24, 2018, and the premiere was staged at the Black Theater, Chungmu Art Center in Seoul from November 30, 2018, to February 2, 2019, also under the direction of Kim Dong-yeon.

In March 2022, Kim was cast in the first work of The 9th Best Plays Festival (Note: The Best Play Festival or Theater Heated Battle (연극열전) is a biennale theater festival with the purpose of motivating and enriching the Korean theater industry.) in April 2022: The Nature of Forgetting from the British production Theater Re. The play received acclaim for its movement when it premiered in London in 2017 under the direction of Guillaume Pigé and composer Alex Judd. The Nature of Forgetting premiered in Korea in 2019 by the Wooran Foundation for the Performing Arts and The Best Play, achieving sold-out performances. In the 2022 replay, Kim portrayed dual roles as the wife and daughter of the character played by actor Kim Ji-cheol, who portrayed a man suffering from early dementia and memory loss.

Kim's next projects included two overlapping works: the play Helmet and the creative musical Sylvia Lives. In the fourth performance of Helmet, Kim had a dual role as Helmet B, alongside Jeong In-jeong, in a gender-blind casting. The play, written by Ji Yi-sun, known for her works Capone Trilogy and Bunker Trilogy, was directed by Kim Tae-hyung. It took place at the Small Theater of Hongik University Daehak-ro Art Center from May 17 to August 11, 2022.

"I believe my strength lies in my flexibility. I am able to adapt to different people and situations, which allows me to understand and empathize with characters when analyzing a script. Even if I feel that I am lacking in a particular role, I enjoy the challenge of thinking about how I can improve in the future."

— Kim Joo-yeon on her strength (2021)

In Sylvia Lives, Kim portrayed Pulitzer Prize-winning poet Sylvia Plath (1932–1963), sharing the role with Ju Da-on and Choi Tae-yi, who had also played the character prior to the 2022 production. To prepare for the role, Kim immersed herself in Plath's persona by reading The Diary of Sylvia Plath and her poetry. The musical was showcased at Daehak-ro TOM 2 Building from July 12 to August 28, 2022. It was a production by Performance Studio Production, overseen by writer and director Jo Yoon-ji, composer Kim Seung-min, music director Lee Han-mil, and choreographer Choi Seong-dae. The Seoul Foundation for Arts and Culture selected Sylvia Lives following its successful runs at the Arko-Han Ye-jong Musical Academy in 2020 and the Yes24 Stage Showcase in 2021.

Kim's musical L'art reste premiered in September 2022 at Dream Art Center 2 in Daehak-ro. This production tells the story of Kim Hyang-an (1916–2004), a prominent Korean-Asian modern and contemporary artist, and her love life.Kim takes on the role of Byeon Dong-rim, a younger version of Kim Hyang-an, who engages in an affair with the poet Lee Sang. The musical interweaves narratives between Kim Hyang-an and her husband Kim Whan-ki, as well as flashbacks to her youthful self as Byeon Dong-rim.

In November 2022, Kim returned to the stage with two plays: Clumsy People and Orphans. Clumsy People, which originally premiered at the Seoul Theater Festival in 1995, is a work by Jang Jin, that marked the reunion of Kim and the playwright following their collaboration on Kim's debut play, Taxi Driver. Kim Joo-yeon, Choi Ha-yoon, and Park Ji-ye shared the role of Yoo Hwa-yi, a character known for her lively charm, despite being both talkative and reserved. In the play Orphans, Kim portrays Philip, alongside Choi Soo-jin, Hyun Seok-jun, and Shin Joo-hyeop. Written by Lyle Kessler and originally premiered in Los Angeles in 1983, this play received acclaim. Following its successful Korean premiere in 2017 and encore in 2019, Orphans received positive reviews and sold out shows. It also won the Stagetalk Audience Choice Awards (SACA) (Note: StageTalk Audience's Choice Awards (SACA) is theater and musical award festival that decides the winner based on pure votes from fans of the performance in the best play category) in 2017 and 2019.

In March 2023, after concluding the aforementioned two plays, Kim was cast as Actress D in the third iteration of the Korean adaptation of the Japanese play The Dressing Room (Gakuya). Written by Kunio Shimizu, the play centers around four actresses preparing for a staging of Anton Chekhov's The Seagull. As the narrative unfolds, it becomes apparent that things are not straightforward. The Dressing Room delves into themes of flawed memory and the enduring presence of memory even after death.

In April 2023, Hong Company announced that Kim reprised her role as Byeon Dong-rim in the revival of the musical L'art reste. The revival's premiere was scheduled for June 2023.

In 2025, Kim acted in the Korean premiere of the British play The Effect, written by Lucy Prebble. Kim was triple cast as the character Connie Hall, starring alongside Park Jeong-bok and Ok Ja-yeon. The play is a story about "love and sorrow" centered on four characters: Connie Hall and Tristan Frey, who are participating in a clinical trial for an antidepressant, and the two doctors supervising the test, Dr. Lorna James and Dr. Toby Seeley. The production was directed by Min Sae-rom, with Park Ji-sun as the screenwriter and Bae Yu-ri as the motion director. The show ran from June 10 to August 31 at the Nol Seo-kyung Square Scone Theater 2.

== Filmographies ==
=== Film ===
Film performances
Year	Title		Role	Notes	Ref.
Year	English	Korean	Role	Notes	Ref.
TBA	Jochiwon's commentary	조치원 해문이	Oh Tae-ri		

=== Television ===
Television performances
Year	Title		Role	Notes	Ref.
Year	English	Korean	Role	Notes	Ref.
2019	Watcher	왓쳐	Baek Son-gi	Cameo (Ep.7) OCN Drama	
2021	Do Do Sol Sol La La Sol	도도솔솔라라솔	Jin Ha-young	Support Role KBS2 Drama	
2021	Youth of May	오월의 청춘	Nurse	Cameo (Ep.12) KBS2 Drama	
2021	Hometown Cha-Cha-Cha	갯마을 차차차	Ham Yung-kyung	Support role tvN Drama	
2022	May It Please the Court	변론을 시작하겠습니다	Lee Soon-young	Support role (Ep. 1-2) Disney+ Drama	

=== Web series ===
Web Series performances
Year	Title		Role	Notes	Ref.
Year	English	Korean	Role	Notes	Ref.
2021	Move to Heaven	무브 투 헤븐: 나는 유품정리사입니다	Min Ji-won	Cameo (Ep.10); Netflix Original Series	
2022	Welcome to Wedding Hell	결혼백서	Lee Soo-yeon	Supporting Cast; Kakao TV Original Series	
2022	May It Please the Court	변론을 시작하겠습니다	Lee Soon-young	Cameo; Disney plus original series	

=== Music video appearances ===
Year	Title	Artist(s)	Ref.
2021	"Confession" (고백)	Lee Sa-wol	

== Stage credits ==
=== Musical ===
Musical performances
Year	Title		Role	Theater	Date	Ref.
Year	English	Korean	Role	Theater	Date	Ref.
2016	Interview	인터뷰	Joan	Hyundai Card UNDERSTAGE	05/14–05/26	
2016	La Peste	패스트	Jahn	LG Art Center	07/22–10/02	
2016	Interview	인터뷰	Joan	Suhyeon Theater (DCF Daemyung Cultural Factory 3F)	09/24–11/27	
2017	Interview	인터뷰	Joan	the Jeff Blue Theater in Roppongi, Tokyo, Japan	05/01–05/05	
2017	Interview	인터뷰	Joan	Daehak-ro TOM 1	06/01–08/20	
2017	The Great Catsby	위대한 캣츠비	Seon	Uniflex tube 2	06/23–09/03	
2017–2018	Laundry	빨래	Seo Na-young	Oriental Art Theater Hall 1 (former Art Center K Square Theater)	11.29–04.29	
2018	Interview	인터뷰	Joan	Daehak-ro Dream Art Center Building 1	07/10–09/30	
2018	Interview	인터뷰	Joan	Heulik Hall in Tokyo	10/05–10/08	
2018	Maybe Happy Ending	어쩌면 해피엔딩	Claire	The main hall of the Yokohama Pacifico Yokohama Conference Center, Yokohama	May 3 to 6	
2018	Maybe Happy Ending	어쩌면 해피엔딩	Claire	Morinomiya Piroti Hall in Osaka	May 10 to 13	
2019	Jeongdong Theater Create-ing — Nangrang Gisaeng	정동극장 창작ing — 낭랑긔생	Kang Hyang-ran	National Jeongdong Theater Seoul	07/26–08/18	
2019	Murderer	머더러	Anne	2nd Daehak-ro Thioem Hall	09/20–11/17	
2020	Julie and Paul	줄리 앤 폴	Julie	Daehak-ro Dream Art Center Building 1	01/10–03/02	
2020	Damian	데미안	Damian and Sinclair	Uniflex tube 2	03/07–04/26	
2021–2022	Vampire Arthur	뱀파이어 아더	Emma	Chungmu Art Center Medium Theater Black	11/09–02/06	
2022	Sylvia, Live	실비아, 살다	Sylvia Plath	2nd Daehak-ro Thioem Hall	07/12–08/28	
2022	L'art reste	라흐 헤스트	Dong-rim	Daehak-ro Dream Art Center Building 2	09/06–11/13	
2023	L'art reste	라흐 헤스트	Dong-rim	Daehak-ro Dream Art Center Building 1	06/13–09/03	
2023	Hook	후크	Wendy	Art One Theatre 2	September 5, 2023 - November 26, 2023	
2025	L'art reste	라흐 헤스트	Dong-rim	Yes24 Stage 1	March 25, 2025 - June 15, 2025	

=== Theater ===
Theater performances
Year	Title		Role	Theater	Date	Ref.
Year	English	Korean	Role	Theater	Date	Ref.
2015	Taxi Driver	택시 드리벌	Yu Hwa-yi	Doosan Art Center Yeongang Hall	September 1, 2015 - November 22, 2015	
2015	Taxi Driver	택시 드리벌	Yu Hwa-yi	Ulsan Museum of Contemporary Art's Grand Concert Hall	December 18 to 19, 2015	
2016	Taxi Driver	택시 드리벌	Yu Hwa-yi	NOL Uniplex (Large Theater)	February 6 to 21, 2016	
2017	The Lower Depths	밑바닥에서	Natasha	Daehak-ro Dream Art Center Building 2	February 9, 2017 - March 12, 2017	
2018	Disappearance into thin air	소실 사라지다	Emilia Nehemkin	Yeonwoo Small Theater	December 12–30	
2019	The Crucible	시련	Mary Warren	Lee Hae-rang Theater of Art	February 26, 2019 - March 31, 2019	
2019	Hot Summer	뜨거운 여름	Chae Kyung	Yes24 Stage Hall 3	May 17, 2019 - June 30, 2019	
2019	Temple	템플	Temple Grandin	Goyang Aramnuri Sara New Theater	October 11, 2019 - October 13, 2019	
2020	Temple	템플	Temple Grandin	Nol Uniplex Hall 1 (Large Theater)	October 2, 2020 - October 11, 2020	
2020	Temple	템플	Temple Grandin	Uijeongbu Arts Center Grand Theater	November 30, 2020	
2020	Dear Elena Teacher	존경하는 엘레나 선생님	Layla	Hongik University Daehangno Art Center Small Theater	06/16–09/06	
2020	Touch for Love	사랑에 스치다	Eun-ju	Sky Theater Building 2 (formerly JK Art Hall)	12/16–12/27	
2020–2021	The Play Beef	왓츠 유어 맥비프	Jin Se-hee	Daehak-ro Dream Art Center Building 3	12/05–03/21	
2021	Government Ferry Line	관부연락선	Yun Sim-deok	Daehakro Jayu Theater	03/01–05/09	
2021	Temple	템플 - 광명	Temple Grandin	Daehangno Art Theater Grand Theater	09/03–09/29	
2022	The Nature of Forgetting	네이처 오브 포겟팅	Wife and daughter	Woo-ran Cultural Foundation's Woo-ran 2nd Scenario	April 14 to 30	
2022	The Helmet	더 헬멧	Helmet B	Hongik University Daehangno Art Center Small Theater	May 17 to August 11	
2022–2023	Clumsy People	서툰 사람들	Yu Hwa-yi	Yes, 24 Stage Hall 3	November 26 to February 19	
2022–2023	Orphans	오펀스	Philip	Art One Theater Hall 1	November 29 to February 26	
2023	Dressing Room	분장실	D	The Seokyeong University Performing Arts Center's Scone Hall 2	March 3 to May 28	
2023	Temple	템플	Temple Grandin	Incheon Art Hall Small Performance Hall	September 8 to 9	
2023–2024	Temple	템플	Temple Grandin	Seokyeong University Performing Arts Center Scone Hall	December 15 to February 18, 2024	
2023–2024	The Nature of Forgetting	네이처 오브 포겟팅	Wife and daughter	Art One Theatre 2	December 1 to January 28	
2024	Bea	비	Bea	LG Arts Center Seoul U+ Stage	February 17, 2024 - March 24, 2024	
2024	Closer	클로저	Alice	Plus Theater	April 23 to July 14	
2024	Temple	템플	Temple Grandin	Pyeongchon Art Hall - Anyang	August 24, 2024	
2025	Capone Trilogy	카포네 트릴로지	Lady	Hongik University Daehakro Art Center Small Theater	March 11, 2025 - June 1, 2025	
2025	The Effect	디 이펙트	Connie Hall	NOL Seogyeong Square Scone 2nd Building	June 10, 2025, to August 31, 2025	
2025	The Effect	디 이펙트	Connie Hall	NOL Seogyeong Square Scone 2nd Building	July 23 to 26, 2025	

== Awards and nominations ==
List of Award(s) and Nomination(s)
Year	Award ceremony	Category	Nominee / Work	Result	Ref.
2015	Stage Talk Audience's Choice Awards (SACA)	Best Rookie Actress Theater	The Interview	Nominated	
2023	Interpark Golden Ticket Awards	Best Actress in a Play	The Nature of Forgetting; The Helmet; Orphan; Clumsy People	Won	
