= Tomato (album) =

Studio album by Chakra
- Released: August 21, 2003
- Recorded: 2002–2003
- Genre: K-pop, dance
- Length: 51:26
- Language: Korean
- Label: Cream Records; Zam Entertainment; Kiss Entertainment

Chakra chronology
| Chakra (2002) | Tomato (2003) |

Tomato was the fourth and final studio album of the South Korean girl group Chakra before disbanding. The singles were From me to you, True love in this world is a Lie and Why I'm the only One. The album sold a groundbreaking 100,000 copies.

== Track listing ==
1. Intro
2. Nan Neoege (난 너에게)
3. Wae Naman (왜 나만)
4. I Sesange Jinsilhan Sarangeun Geojitmarida (이 세상에 진실한 사랑은 거짓말이다)
5. Tajan (타잔)
6. Ex-boyfriend
7. Hey boy
8. The Anonymity
9. Best love
10. The sign
11. Na (나)
12. fever
13. The friendship
14. outro
15. Hidden Track: Nan Neoege (Remix Version) (난 너에게)
