= Autumn Shower =

South Korean television drama

- Written by: Jo Myung-joo
- Directed by: Yoon Jae-moon
- Starring: Oh Ji-ho; Kim So-yeon; Jung Ryeo-won; Lee Chun-hee
- Country of origin: South Korea
- Original language: Korean
- No. of episodes: 16

Production
- Executive producer: Kim Nam-won

Original release
- Network: MBC
- Release: September 21 – November 10, 2005

Autumn Shower (Korean: 가을 소나기; RR: Gaeul sonagi) is a South Korean television drama broadcast from September to November 2005 on MBC.

== Plot ==
Choi Yoon-jae (Oh Ji-ho) ends up in a car accident causing the passenger, his wife Kyu-eun (Kim So-yeon), to go into a coma. Park Yeon-seo (Jung Ryeo-won), Kyu-eun's best friend, is secretly in love with Yoon-jae. While Kyu-eun is in a coma, Yoon-jae and Yeon-seo begin an affair.

== Cast ==
- Oh Ji-ho as Choi Yoon-jae
- Kim So-yeon as Lee Kyu-eun
- Jung Ryeo-won as Park Yeon-seo
- Lee Chun-hee as Kim Soo-hyung
- Oh Se-jung as a girl who likes Soo-hyung
- Park Dong-choon as Yeon-seo's father
- Han Jung-hee as Yeon-seo's mother
- Kim Hye-ok as Nam Kyung-mi (Yeon-seo's step mother, 48)
- Han Jin-hee as Choi Suk-won (Yoon-jae's father, 58–61)
- Kim Young-ran as Kang Hyung-sook (Yoon-jae's mother, 58–61)
- Hwang Woo-jin as Hwang Park-soo
