= In Love and War (2011 film) =

- Hangul: 적과의 동침
- Hanja: 摘果의 同寢
- RR: Jeokgwaui dongchim
- MR: Chŏkkwaŭi tongch'im
- Directed by: Park Geon-yong
- Written by: Bae Se-young
- Produced by: Kim Beom-sik; Han Kil-ro; Park Yong-soo
- Starring: Kim Joo-hyuk; Jung Ryeo-won; Yoo Hae-jin
- Cinematography: Jung Chan-hong
- Edited by: Shin Mi-kyeong
- Music by: Park Ji-man
- Distributed by: Showbox/Mediaplex
- Release date: April 27, 2011
- Running time: 135 minutes
- Country: South Korea
- Language: Korean

In Love and War (Korean: 적과의 동침; RR: Jeokgwaui dongchim; lit. 'Sleeping with the Enemy') is a 2011 South Korean romantic comedy-drama film starring Kim Joo-hyuk and Jung Ryeo-won. In June 1950, soon after the Korean War breaks out, a troop of North Korean soldiers enter a small South Korean village. The troop captain proclaims that they came to liberate the villagers but their true agenda is to ferret out the reactionaries. The villagers offer them heartfelt hospitality and cooperation to avoid falling out of the army's favor. Eventually genuinely strong and close friendship starts to build up between the soldiers and the villagers.

Screenwriter Bae Se-young was inspired by a true story in the life of her grandmother, who used to live in Pyeongtaek. A group of soldiers from the North Korean People's Army stayed for a couple of days at the grandmother's home (because her father was the village leader), and one young soldier, touched by the villagers' hospitality, said that he wanted to stay.

When asked to describe the film, director Park Geon-yong said that its "main purpose is to highlight the plight of the most vulnerable people in the Korean War - innocent civilians." He said he "wanted to use it to inspire viewers to think about what the war left behind," and "tried to give the tragic story a light-hearted touch."

== Plot ==
In a remote village called Seokjeongni, the residents manage to learn that North Korean troops have invaded the South via the chief's radio. Normalcy nevertheless continues for the villagers, who are all preoccupied with more pressing matters: an arranged wedding. Just a few days before the ceremony the groom is forced to flee when news breaks that Northern troops are fast capturing cities and annihilating anticommunist activists. But Seol-hee (Jung Ryeo-won) has no time to brood over her missing, beloved husband-to-be. North Korean troops arrive in town and announce their holy mission to "liberate" the Southerners.

As the chief's granddaughter and town's only schoolteacher, Seol-hee must remain strong — but instead of resisting the unwelcome guests she joins the town's intricate survival scheme and zealously embraces the Marxist teachings. Hot-tempered widower Jae-chun (Yoo Hae-jin), quiet yet clever Baek (Kim Sang-ho), and even Seol-hee's unassuming grandfather (Byun Hee-bong) manage to feign unwavering loyalty. Then a rivalry ensues between Seokjoengni and a neighboring village to host the construction of a bomb shelter under the soldiers' supervision.

Meanwhile, the troop's officer, Jung-woong (Kim Joo-hyuk), is propelled by an ulterior motive. He wants to find the charming young girl he met twelve years ago when Korea was one country.

What begins as a facade, however, develops into genuine and strong feelings among people who would have been neighbors if it hadn't been for geopolitics. Obvious signs of intensely pure romantic love also blossom between Jung-woong and Seol-hee, but the peaceful coexistence proves all too fragile amid the realities of war.

== Cast ==
- Kim Joo-hyuk ... Kim Jung-woong
- Jung Ryeo-won ... Park Seol-hee
  - Chae Bin ... young Seol-hee
- Yoo Hae-jin ... Jae-chun
- Byun Hee-bong ... Gu-jang, Seol-hee's grandfather
- Kim Sang-ho ... Mr. Baek
- Shin Jung-geun ... Bong-ki
- Yang Jung-a ... Woman from Suwon
- Kim Bo-yeon ... Wol-sun
- Jeon No-min ... North Korean soldier
- Lee David ... Dong-woo
- Yoo Ha-jun ... North Korean platoon leader
- Eom Ji-seong ... Min-goo
- Oh Hee-joon as Machine gun soldier
- Choi Won-young ... Jae-bok
- Lee Sin-seong
- Han Ki-joong ... Jung-woong's father
