= Wok of Love =

South Korean Drama series

- Promotional poster
- Hangul: 기름진 멜로
- Lit.: Greasy Melo
- RR: Gireumjin mello
- MR: Kirŭmjin mello
- Genre: Drama; Romance; Comedy
- Created by: Han Jeong-hwan (SBS Drama)
- Written by: Seo Sook-hyang
- Directed by: Park Seon-ho
- Starring: Lee Jun-ho; Jang Hyuk; Jung Ryeo-won
- Music by: Nam Hye-seung
- Country of origin: South Korea
- Original language: Korean
- No. of episodes: 38 (Note: Originally scheduled to air for 40 episodes, the series was reduced by two episodes in lieu of three preempts.) (Note: In order to circumvent Korean laws that prevent commercial breaks in the middle of an episode, what would previously have been aired as single 70 minute episodes are now being repackaged as two 35 minute episodes, with two episodes being shown each night with a commercial break between the two.)

Production
- Executive producers: Lee Hun-hee; Kim Dong-joon
- Camera setup: Single-camera
- Running time: 35 minutes
- Production company: S.M. C&C (Note: The same production company behind this series' preceding drama.)

Original release
- Network: SBS TV
- Release: May 7 – July 17, 2018

Wok of Love (Korean: 기름진 멜로; RR: Gireumjin mello) is a 2018 South Korean television series starring Lee Jun-ho, Jang Hyuk and Jung Ryeo-won. It aired on SBS from May 7 to July 17, 2018 on Mondays and Tuesdays at 22:00 (KST) for 38 episodes.

== Synopsis ==
Wok of Love is a love story about a group of men and women that is described as "hotter than the boiling oil in a sizzling hot wok". Across the street of the six-star Giant Hotel, there stood a Chinese restaurant called Hungry Wok. Doo Chil-sung, the owner of the restaurant and a former gangster from the Big Dipper Gang, took over the restaurant in order to provide a place of work for his former gang members. One day, former star chef Seo Poong, and bankrupt heiress Dan Sae-woo, whose lives were turned upside down overnight, came to visit Chil-sung for his help to get them back on their feet.

== Cast ==
=== Main ===
- Lee Jun-ho as Seo Poong (31)

A tough spirit who starts from the very bottom of a hotel kitchen to becoming a top chef in a Chinese restaurant of Giant Hotel. A conspiracy resulted in the removal from his job. He ends up being a co-owner of the "Hungry Wok".

- Jang Hyuk as Doo Chil-sung (40)

A former loan shark gangster from the 'Big Dipper' gang who seems intimidating but is secretly very kind hearted. After serving his time in prison, he ends up running a failing Chinese restaurant with his ever so loyal gang members.

- Jung Ryeo-won as Dan Sae-woo (33)

A chaebol heiress who enjoys horseback riding and fencing but is currently bankrupt. She undergoes a major change in her life after tasting a bowl of Jajangmyeon at a Chinese restaurant.

=== Supporting ===
==== People working in Hungry Wok ====
- Lee Mi-sook as Jin Jung-hye (53)

A beautiful and vivacious chaebol wife and an ex beauty queen. She won the title for Miss Onion pageant 20 odd years ago.

- Park Ji-young as Chae Seol-ja (45)

Chef of a Chinese restaurant who came to Korea from the Yanbian Korean Autonomous Prefecture 25 years ago.

- Tae Hang-ho as Im Geok-jeong (34)

A timid restaurant helper who dreams about becoming a chef, and sees Seo Poong as his role model.

==== Members of Big Dipper Gang ====
- Jo Jae-yoon as Oh Maeng-dal (42)

Right-hand man of Doo Chil-sung in the 'Big Dipper' gang. He began working in the Hungry Wok restaurant after being released from prison, under the orders of Chil-sung.

- Kim Hyun-joon as Kwang Dong-sik (27)

A member of the 'Big Dipper' gang, the only married man among them. He is a warm-hearted person who wants to learn Chinese cooking skills as soon as possible in order not to worry his wife.

- Choi Ki-sub as Jeon Yi Man (35)

A gangster working in the same restaurant who finds fighting easier than cooking.

- Cha In-ha as Bong Chi-soo (25)

A member of the 'Big Dipper' gang, now a dumpling master who looks younger than his age and quick in calculations.

- Choi Won-myeong as Yang Kang-ho (24)

The youngest member of the 'Big Dipper' gang who is extremely loyal and strong.

==== People working in Giant Hotel ====
- Kim Sa-kwon as Yong Seung-ryong (30)

An ambitious president of Giant Hotel.

- Im Won-hee as Wang Choon-soo (48)

Main chef of the Chinese restaurant of Giant Hotel.

- Oh Eui-shik as Maeng Sam-seon (31)

A chef-in-training under a famous chef in the Giant Hotel. Seo Poong's rival who pretends to be his friend.

- Hong Yoon-hwa as Kan Bora (27)

The only female chef in Giant Hotel's Chinese restaurant's kitchen.

- Kang Rae-yeon as Koong Rae-yeon (30)

Hall manager of Giant Hotel who speaks fluent Chinese, and values money above friendship.

==== Others ====
- Lee Mi-sook as Kim Sun-nyeo (74)

A mysterious woman who frequently appears and disappears around Doo Chil-sung without warning. She is Chil-sung's mother who had abandoned him in a Chinese restaurant while eating sweet sour pork and jajangmyeon.

- Cha Joo-young as Seok Dal-hee (31)

A plastic surgeon who has enjoyed success in her career thanks to the support of her father who runs a Chinese restaurant. Her marriage to her first love, Seo Poong is troubled, when she cheats on him.

- Lee Ki-hyuk as Na Oh-jik (34)

A successful obstetrician.

- Ok Ja-yeon as Lee Ji-kyung (32)

Animal Hospital Veterinarian

- Lee Ki-young as Dan Seung-ki (57)

Father of Dan Sae-woo who has become bankrupt

- Jang Hee-ryung as Lee Boon-hong (22)

Kwang Dong-sik's wife. A room maid at the Giant Hotel. She draws attention wherever she goes due to her pretty and sexy appearance.

=== Special appearance ===
- Ryu Seung-soo as Cockeye
- Bae Hae-sun as Nurse
- Shin Dong-yup as Immar's voice

== Production ==
The first script reading took place in late March 2018.

== Original soundtrack ==
Wok of Love OST

Soundtrack album by Various artists
- Released: 2018
- Genre: Soundtrack
- Languages: Korean; English
- Labels: Plus Media; kakao M

=== Part 1 ===
Released on May 7, 2018
No.	Title	Artist	Length
1.	"There's Something" (뭔가 있어)	Jeong Se-woon	03:58
2.	"There's Something" (Inst.)		03:58

=== Part 2 ===
Released on May 14, 2018
No.	Title	Artist	Length
1.	"At That Time" (그 시간에)	Choi Young-jae (GOT7)	03:26
2.	"At That Time" (Inst.)		03:26

=== Part 3 ===
Released on May 21, 2018
No.	Title	Artist	Length
1.	"Was It You" (너였었니)	Baek A-yeon	04:31
2.	"Was It You" (Inst.)		04:31

=== Part 4 ===
Released on May 28, 2018
No.	Title	Artist	Length
1.	"I'll Do It Every Day" (매일매일 그리울거야)	Jooyoung	03:55
2.	"I'll Do It Every Day" (Inst.)		03:55

=== Part 5 ===
Released on June 11, 2018
No.	Title	Artist	Length
1.	"At Beginning Of Love" (사랑이 시작될때)	Kassy	4:10
2.	"At Beginning Of Love" (Inst.)		4:10

== Ratings ==
- In the table below, the blue numbers represent the lowest ratings and the red numbers represent the highest ratings.
- NR denotes that the drama did not rank in the top 20 daily programs on that date.
- TNmS stop publishing their report from June 2018.

Ep.	Broadcast date	Average audience share			
Ep.	Broadcast date	TNmS		AGB Nielsen	
Ep.	Broadcast date	Nationwide	Seoul	Nationwide	Seoul
1	May 7, 2018	6.5% (NR)	7.6%	5.8% (NR)	6.8% (15th)
2	May 7, 2018	7.3% (18th)	8.2%	6.4% (17th)	7.3% (10th)
3	May 8, 2018	5.7% (NR)	6.9%	4.7% (NR)	5.8% (15th)
4	May 8, 2018	7.0% (15th)	8.5%	5.6% (18th)	7.1% (12th)
5	May 14, 2018	5.9% (NR)	6.3%	5.4% (NR)	5.8% (18th)
6	May 14, 2018	6.9% (16th)	7.2%	5.8% (19th)	6.1% (15th)
7	May 15, 2018	6.2% (20th)	6.7%	5.1% (NR)	5.6% (19th)
8	May 15, 2018	7.3% (13th)	8.6%	6.8% (11th)	8.2% (9th)
9	May 21, 2018	5.8% (NR)	6.0%	5.2% (NR)	5.3% (NR)
10	May 21, 2018	6.3% (20th)	6.9%	5.8% (20th)	6.4% (16th)
11	May 22, 2018	5.9% (NR)	6.2%	4.9% (NR)	5.1% (NR)
12	May 22, 2018	6.6% (16th)	7.4%	5.8% (NR)	6.6% (16th)
13	May 28, 2018	6.7% (NR)	6.9%	4.8% (NR)	5.0% (NR)
14	May 28, 2018	7.1% (18th)	7.3%	5.5% (NR)	5.7% (NR)
15	May 29, 2018	5.5% (NR)	6.7%	4.5% (NR)	4.6% (NR)
16	May 29, 2018	6.6% (16th)	7.5%	5.2% (NR)	6.1% (18th)
17	June 4, 2018	5.7%	6.4%	6.0% (NR)	6.8% (13th)
18	June 4, 2018	7.0%	7.9%	6.5% (19th)	7.4% (12th)
19	June 5, 2018	5.8%	6.9%	5.7% (17th)	6.7% (11th)
20	June 5, 2018	6.5%	7.6%	6.4% (13th)	7.4% (8th)
21	June 11, 2018	5.6%	6.3%	5.4% (NR)	6.1% (20th)
22	June 11, 2018	7.0%	7.8%	6.4% (20th)	7.2% (12th)
23	June 25, 2018 (Note: No episodes were aired on June 12 due to news coverage on the 2018 DPRK-US Singapore Summit, and on June 18 and 19 due to live coverage of the 2018 FIFA World Cup.)	6.7%	7.5%	6.1% (NR)	7.2% (12th)
24	June 25, 2018	7.3%	8.6%	7.1% (13th)	8.4% (7th)
25	June 26, 2018	6.6%	7.9%	7.5% (14th)	8.8% (9th)
26	June 26, 2018	7.9%	9.0%	9.3% (7th)	10.4% (5th)
27	July 2, 2018	7.3%	8.6%	7.4% (17th)	8.7% (11th)
28	July 2, 2018	8.6%	10.1%	9.3% (6th)	10.8% (5th)
29	July 3, 2018	6.1%	7.3%	5.9% (NR)	7.1% (16th)
30	July 3, 2018	7.4%	8.8%	7.4% (15th)	8.9% (6th)
31	July 9, 2018	5.9%	7.4%	6.2% (NR)	7.7% (12th)
32	July 9, 2018	6.5%	8.1%	7.3% (17th)	8.9% (9th)
33	July 10, 2018	5.7%	6.5%	6.8% (16th)	7.6% (11th)
34	July 10, 2018	6.6%	7.8%	7.6% (9th)	8.7% (7th)
35	July 16, 2018	5.2%	6.0%	5.4% (NR)	6.3% (18th)
36	July 16, 2018	6.4%	7.1%	6.4% (17th)	7.2% (13th)
37	July 17, 2018	5.4%	6.7%	5.6% (17th)	6.9% (13th)
38	July 17, 2018	6.9%	8.2%	7.0% (13th)	8.1% (7th)
Average		6.6%	7.4%	6.2%	7.1%

== Awards and nominations ==
Year	Award	Category	Nominee	Result	Ref.
2018	SBS Drama Awards	Top Excellence Award, Actor in a Monday-Tuesday Drama	Jang Hyuk	Nominated	
2018	SBS Drama Awards	Top Excellence Award, Actor in a Monday-Tuesday Drama	Lee Jun-ho	Nominated	
2018	SBS Drama Awards	Top Excellence Award, Actress in a Monday-Tuesday Drama	Jung Ryeo-won	Nominated	
2018	SBS Drama Awards	Top Excellence Award, Actress in a Monday-Tuesday Drama	Lee Mi-sook	Nominated	
2018	SBS Drama Awards	Excellence Award, Actress in a Monday-Tuesday Drama	Park Ji-young	Nominated	
2018	SBS Drama Awards	Best Supporting Actor	Im Won-hee	Won	
