= The King of Dramas =

2012 South Korean television series

- Promotional poster
- Also known as: The Lord of the Drama
- Hangul: 드라마의 제왕
- Hanja: 드라마의帝王
- RR: Deuramaui jewang
- MR: Tŭramaŭi chewang
- Genre: Satire; Comedy; Romance
- Written by: Jang Hang-jun; Lee Ji-hyo
- Directed by: Hong Sung-chang
- Starring: Kim Myung-min; Jung Ryeo-won; Choi Siwon
- Composer: Park Se-joon
- Country of origin: South Korea
- Original language: Korean
- No. of episodes: 18

Production
- Cinematography: Kim Tae-kwon
- Running time: Mondays and Tuesdays at 21:55 (KST)
- Production company: SSD/Golden Thumb

Original release
- Network: Seoul Broadcasting System
- Release: 5 November 2012 – 8 January 2013

The King of Dramas (Korean: 드라마의 제왕; RR: Deuramaui jewang) is a 2012 South Korean television series, starring Kim Myung-min, Jung Ryeo-won and Choi Siwon of Super Junior. It is a satirical dramedy about what goes on behind the scenes in making a TV drama. It aired on SBS from November 5, 2012, to January 8, 2013, on Mondays and Tuesdays at 21:55 for 18 episodes.

== Plot ==
Set against the backdrop of the Korean entertainment business, The King of Dramas revolves around Anthony Kim (Kim Myung-min), the brilliant CEO of a drama production company who will do anything and everything for the sake of money, fame and success. He is known to possess the Midas touch as he has created blockbuster dramas and Hallyu stars. When a death on the set precipitates his fall from grace, Anthony attempts to regain his former status by putting the drama The Morning of Keijo on air. And to accomplish that, he needs the help of idealistic Lee Go-eun (Jung Ryeo-won), who dreams of becoming a top writer someday, and the handsome but egoistic actor Kang Hyun-min (Choi Siwon).

== Cast ==
Main characters

- Kim Myung-min as Anthony Kim - a drama production company CEO, who is commanding and shrewd, even under adverse circumstances.
- Jung Ryeo-won as Lee Go-eun - an idealistic, rookie writer.
- Choi Si-won as Kang Hyun-min - self-absorbed top star and Hallyu celebrity, lead actor of The Morning of Keijo.
- Jung Man-sik as Oh Jin-wan - Anthony's nemesis, the underhanded CEO of Empire Productions.
- Oh Ji-eun as Sung Min-ah - prickly lead actress of The Morning of Keijo, who shares a past with Anthony.
- Kwon Hae-hyo as Nam Woon-hyung - current head of drama programming.
- Jung In-gi as Gu Young-mok - director of The Morning of Keijo.

Seoul Broadcasting Corporation

- Song Min-hyung as Deputy director Kim
- Jung Han-heon as Deputy director Park
- Kim Seung-hwan as Lee Sung-jo
- Lee Dong-hoon as Yoon Kwang-jae
- Yoon Joo-sang as Moon Sang-il - former head of drama programming.
- Jeon Gook-hwan as SBC station CEO

World Productions

- Seo Dong-won as Joo Dong-seok
- Heo Joon-seok as Han Kang-wook
- Park Sang-hun as Park Seok-hyun
- Yoon Yong-jin as Gu Hee-jae

Empire Productions

- Seo Joo-hee as Jung Hong-joo
- Kim Kyung-bum as Director Heo
- Jang Won-young as Drama director Hong
- Lee Hae-woon as PD Park
- Park Geun-hyung as Chairman of Empire Productions

Extended cast

- Choi Soo-eun as Yoon Bit-na - the pop star Hyun-min is dating.
- Sung Byung-sook as Park Kang-ja - Go-eun's mother and restaurant proprietor.
- Oh Hyun-soo as Choi Do-hyung
- Park Kyu-sun as Bae Kwang-soo
- Jeon Moo-song as Watanabe - Japanese yakuza investor.
- Mina Fujii as Akiko - Watanabe's wife
- Jang Hyun-sung as Watanabe Kenji - new CEO of Watanabe Group.
- Jung Chan as chairman of Taesan Group
- Park Shin-hye as lead actress of Elegant Revenge (cameo, ep 1)
- Choi Tae-joon as Oh In-sung - lead actor of Elegant Revenge (cameo, ep 1)
- Park Joon-geum as Hyun-min's mother (cameo, ep 7)

== Production ==
This was Kim Myung-min's first TV series in four years; his last series was Beethoven Virus in 2008 and the actor had focused more on his film career in recent years.

The series is directed by Hong Sung-chang of You're Beautiful and written by Jang Hang-jun of Sign. Filming began on September 14, 2012, in Yeouido, Seoul.

Choi Siwon filmed his first scene on September 26 with Jung Ryeo-won. He sang a solo during his character's fan meeting scene, for which he recruited his fans as extras.

It was announced on December 17 that the series was extended by two episodes from the original 16 to 18. The finale aired on January 8, 2013, with the last two episodes focusing on the romance between the characters of Anthony Kim and Lee Go-eun.

== Reception ==
Episode #	Original broadcast date	Average audience share			
Episode #	Original broadcast date	TNmS Ratings		AGB Nielsen	
Episode #	Original broadcast date	Nationwide	Seoul National Capital Area	Nationwide	Seoul National Capital Area
1	5 November 2012	6.5%	8.0%	6.5%	7.6%
2	6 November 2012	6.6%	9.1%	7.3%	8.6%
3	12 November 2012	8.9%	10.8%	7.1%	8.9%
4	13 November 2012	9.2%	10.6%	7.3%	8.5%
5	19 November 2012	8.1%	9.7%	8.1%	9.8%
6	20 November 2012	8.3%	10.5%	7.7%	9.0%
7	26 November 2012	8.7%	10.7%	6.8%	7.7%
8	27 November 2012	8.6%	10.6%	6.9%	8.1%
9	3 December 2012	8.5%	10.1%	7.4%	8.2%
10	4 December 2012	8.8%	10.1%	8.9%	10.0%
11	10 December 2012	9.2%	10.9%	7.3%	8.3%
12	11 December 2012	8.1%	9.6%	7.1%	8.1%
13	17 December 2012	7.2%	8.4%	6.7%	7.8%
14	18 December 2012	7.4%	8.7%	7.5%	7.9%
15	24 December 2012	6.8%	7.6%	6.6%	7.9%
16	25 December 2012	7.1%	8.2%	6.9%	8.4%
17	1 January 2013	7.4%	9.4%	6.6%	8.3%
18	7 January 2013	7.6%	9.2%	6.7%	8.0%
