= Bubble Gum (TV series) =

- Promotional poster
- Genre: Romance; Drama
- Written by: Lee Mi-na
- Directed by: Kim Byung-soo
- Creative directors: Jung Ji-hyun; Kwon Young-il; Choo Sang-kyoo
- Starring: Lee Dong-wook; Jung Ryeo-won; Lee Jong-hyuk; Park Hee-von
- Composer: Nam Hye-seung
- Country of origin: South Korea
- Original language: Korean
- No. of episodes: 16

Production
- Executive producers: Kim Young-kyoo; Yoon Ha-rim
- Producers: Lee So-yoon; Yoo Seul-ki
- Cinematography: Jun Byung-moon; Lee Jung-hyuk
- Editor: Lee Mi-kyung
- Camera setup: Single-camera setup
- Running time: 60 minutes
- Production company: Hwa&Dam Pictures

Original release
- Network: tvN
- Release: 26 October – 15 December 2015

Bubble Gum (Korean: 풍선껌; RR: Pungseonkkeom) is a South Korean television series starring Lee Dong-wook, Jung Ryeo-won, Lee Jong-hyuk and Park Hee-von. It aired on tvN on Mondays and Tuesdays at 23:00 (KST) beginning October 26, 2015.

== Synopsis ==
Park Ri-hwan (Lee Dong-wook) comes from a wealthy family who now works as an oriental medical doctor in his own clinic. He grew up with his best friend since childhood, Kim Haeng-ah (Jung Ryeo-won) who works as a radio producer. Haeng-ah's parents both died when she was young and she was taken care by Ri-hwan's mother after her father's death.

Both Ri-hwan and Haeng-ah had feelings for each other but Haeng-ah is taking things slowly due to Ri-hwan's mother who does not want them to be together. The story also involves a chaebol, Yi-seul (Park Hee-von) who has feelings for Ri-hwan and Haeng-ah's ex-boyfriend, who is also her senior/director of the company she works in, who wants her back.

== Cast ==
=== Main ===
- Lee Dong-wook as Park Ri-hwan
  - Yoon Chan-young as young Ri-hwan
- Jung Ryeo-won as Kim Haeng-ah
- Lee Jong-hyuk as Kang Suk-joon
- Park Hee-von as Hong Yi-seul

=== Supporting ===
- Bae Jong-ok as Park Sun-young
- Lee Seung-joon as Kwon Ji-hoon
- Kim Ri-na as Noh Tae-hee
- Kim Jung-nan as Oh Se-young
- Lee Moon-soo as Chef Noh
- Park Chul-min as Kim Joon-hyuk
- Park Won-sang as Jo Dong-il
- Park Sung-geun as Go Sang-kyu
- Ahn Woo-yeon as Ye Joon-soo
- Seo Jeong-yeon as Aunt Gong-joo
- Ji Ha-yoon as Lee Jin-ah
- Go Bo-gyeol as Noh Dong-hwa
- Kim Sa-kwon as Hong Jung-woo
- Park Joon-geum as Yi-seul's mother

== Ratings ==
In this table, the blue numbers represent the lowest ratings and the red numbers represent the highest ratings.

Ep.	Original broadcast date	Title	Average audience share	
Ep.	Original broadcast date	Title	AGB Nielsen	TNmS
Ep.	Original broadcast date	Title	Nationwide	Nationwide
1	October 26, 2015	(저주가 깃든 아이)	1.232%	1.0%
2	October 27, 2015	You asked me, so I... (당신은 내게 부탁했지요, 그래서 나는…)	1.736%	1.7%
3	November 2, 2015	All I Want is What You Want (내가 원하는 건 네가 원하는 건)	0.866%	1.0%
4	November 3, 2015	(오늘의 우리는 어제의 우리가 아닌 걸)	1.316%	1.4%
5	November 9, 2015	That's What You Really Mean (그게 진짜 네 마음이잖아)	1.065%	1.0%
6	November 10, 2015	(어떤 꿈은 현실에 깊이 스며들기도 하죠)	1.697%	1.4%
7	November 16, 2015	(화양연화, 그때는 알 수 없었던)	1.113%	1.1%
8	November 17, 2015	(얼룩져도 좋아, 흉터라도 괜찮아, 사라지지는 마)	1.310%	1.0%
9	November 23, 2015	Too heavy, Too Scary, Love (너무 무거운, 너무 무서운, 사랑)	1.105%	1.0%
10	November 24, 2015	Haeng-ah, I Love You (행아야, 사랑해)	1.396%	1.7%
11	November 30, 2015	Memory is More Than Love (기억이란 사랑보다 더)	0.754%	1.0%
12	December 1, 2015	I'm calling you, like an unending song (나는 너를 불러, 끝나지 않는 노래처럼)	1.705%	1.4%
13	December 7, 2015	(깜깜한 밤하늘에 푸른 신호등)	0.710%	0.8%
14	December 8, 2015	(그리움과 행복은 한 걸음 차이)	1.335%	1.2%
15	December 14, 2015	(행복을 지켜내는 주문, 고마워)	0.766%	1.0%
16	December 15, 2015	(그렇게 빈 틈 사이로 다시 봄이 옵니다)	1.179%	1.3%
Average			1.205%	1.188%

- This drama airs on a cable channel/pay TV which normally has a relatively smaller audience compared to free-to-air TV/public broadcasters (KBS, SBS, MBC and EBS).
