= Two Faces of My Girlfriend =

- Poster
- Directed by: Lee Seok-hoon
- Written by: Hwang In-ho
- Produced by: Kim Min-gi; Heo Chang; Andy Yoon
- Starring: Bong Tae-gyu; Jung Ryeo-won
- Cinematography: Lee Doo-man
- Edited by: Nam Na-yeong
- Music by: Bang Jun-seok
- Production company: FineWorks
- Distributed by: Showbox/Mediaplex
- Release date: September 12, 2007 (South Korea)
- Running time: 117 minutes
- Country: South Korea
- Language: Korean
- Box office: US$4.2 million

Two Faces of My Girlfriend (Korean: 두 얼굴의 여친; RR: Du eolgurui yeochin) is a 2007 South Korean romantic comedy film starring Bong Tae-gyu and Jung Ryeo-won.

This was Jung's first big-screen leading role, for which she won Best New Actress at the 28th Blue Dragon Film Awards in 2007 and at the 4th Premiere Asia Rising Star Awards in 2008.

== Plot ==
Naive and awkward Gu-chang is on his seventh year of college, constantly failing job interviews and living off of an allowance from his divorced sister. The almost 30-year-old virgin has never had a girlfriend, or even kissed a girl before. One day, he picks up a wallet at a dining hall and meets its owner: sweet, innocent and bashful Ani. He falls in love with her instantly and the two begin dating. But just when everything seems to be going well, he discovers another side to Ani: she becomes overly aggressive, drinks too much and cusses loudly. He learns that his girlfriend has multiple personality disorder, and that wild and violent Hani is one of her two personalities.

== Cast ==
- Bong Tae-gyu as Gu-chang
- Jung Ryeo-won as Ani/Hani/Yu-ri
- Lee Hye-eun as Young-sun
- Shin Eun-jung as Sang-hee
- Kim In-kwon as Gu-chang's seonbae
- Jin Tae-hyun as Shi-hoo
- Kim Tae-su as Gu-chang's hubae
- Kim Gyeong-rae as Gu-chang's hubae
- Jang Ji-woong as Gu-chang's hubae
- Kim Sa-hee as Shi-hoo's girlfriend
- Jo Dal-hwan as Bum
- Lee Su-na as Tteok ajumma
- Go Tae-ho as Dong-gu
- Ham Sung-min as Young boy
- Im Hyung-kook as Gu-chang's senior colleague at work
- Lee Young-ah as Glamour girl
- Kim Hye-ok as Gu-chang's mother

== Box office ==
The film was released on September 12, 2007. It attracted 762,112 admissions, earning ₩4,586,849,000 at the box office.

== Remake ==
A Chinese remake titled Goodbye Ani starring Im Yoona is slated for 2015.
