= Eugene Park =

Korean-American violinist (born 1975)

- Born: September 14, 1975 (age 50)
- Origin: Manhattan, New York, U.S.
- Genres: Classic, crossover
- Occupations: Violinist, composer, songwriter, rapper
- Years active: 1996–present
- Website: cafe.daum.net/ujinpark

Korean name
- Hangul: 박유진
- Hanja: 朴維鎭
- RR: Bak Yujin
- MR: Pak Yujin

Eugene Park (Korean: 박유진; born September 14, 1975) is a Korean-American electric violinist.

== Biography ==
Eugene Park was born in New York, to Korean parents who were both doctors. Park began to play the violin at age three, entered the Juilliard Pre-College at age eight, and appeared at the Lincoln Center at age 13. After his graduation from Juilliard in 1996, he released two albums with Sony Music named 'The Bridge' (1997), and 'Peace' (1998).

He won awards at the Juilliard Competition, the Aspen Music School Competition, and the ISO Competition.

Among the orchestras Park has performed with are the Wayne Symphony Orchestra (at age 10), the New York Philharmonic (at Kyunghee University in 2004), and the Seoul Symphony Orchestra.

In 2004, he toured ten US cities, including at the Lincoln Center and UCLA.

Park performed alongside Michael Jackson on the "Michael Jackson & Friends" benefit concert in Korea (1999), and at the Korean presidential inauguration for President Kim Dae Jung.

Park played the violin for Leon Lai's song "Sugar in the Marmalade", and is mentioned briefly in the lyrics.

== Discography ==
- 1997: The Bridge
- 1998: Peace
- 2000: Live
- 2006: The 3rd - Gust
- 2011: mini album Nostalgia
