= Never Ending Story (film) =

- Promotional poster
- Directed by: Jung Yong-joo
- Written by: Park Eun-kyo; Lee Byeong-heon
- Produced by: Park Chang-sun; Heo Jeong-wook
- Starring: Uhm Tae-woong; Jung Ryeo-won
- Cinematography: Kang Seung-ki
- Edited by: Kyung Min-ho
- Production company: 9ers Entertainment
- Distributed by: Hwa&Dam Pictures
- Release date: 18 January 2012
- Running time: 114 minutes
- Country: South Korea
- Language: Korean

Never Ending Story (Korean: 네버엔딩 스토리) is a 2012 South Korean romantic comedy film directed by Jung Yong-joo. Uhm Tae-woong and Jung Ryeo-won star as a mismatched couple who meet at a hospital where they have both been diagnosed with terminal illnesses and decide to spend the rest of their lives together. Kross Pictures remade the film in Vietnamese in 2018 as 100 Days of Sunshine.

== Plot ==
Oh Song-kyung (Jung Ryeo-won) is a well-organized 28-year-old bank teller. She meticulously has a plan for everything, including getting married through a dating agency. Taekwondo master Kang Dong-joo's (Uhm Tae-woong) biggest pleasure is buying lottery tickets in hopes of one day hitting the jackpot. In reality, however, he is an incompetent young man who barely makes ends meet and mooches off his younger brother (Park Ki-woong). He is forced to register with a dating agency because of pressure from his sister-in-law (Yoo Sun), who wants to kick him out of their house.

They are the polar opposites of each other, but a few days after registering with the agency, they meet at a hospital where they have both been diagnosed with brain cancer and given just three months to live. When their doctor's appointments bring them into regular contact, the two fall in love and decide to live their remaining days together. With time running out, together they prepare for the last ceremonies of their lives: their funeral, by shopping for coffins, urns and burial clothes and chambers, as well as wedding plans.

== Cast ==
- Uhm Tae-woong as Kang Dong-joo
- Jung Ryeo-won as Oh Song-kyung
- Park Ki-woong as Dong-joo's brother
- Yoo Sun as Je-soo, Dong-joo's sister-in-law
- Lee Byung-joon as Mr. Perm
- Kwon Hae-hyo as Doctor
- Choi Eun-ju as Jin-joo
- Lee Kan-hee as Jin-joo's aunt
- Park Soo-yong as Jin-joo's boyfriend
- Cha Hwa-yeon as Song-kyung's mother
- Park Yong-shik as Happiness House director
- Park Sung-kwang as matchmaking head
- Ahn Hye-kyung as matchmaking firm president
- Cha Tae-hyun as Song-kyung's friend (cameo)
- Ma Dong-seok as Tow car driver (cameo)

== Reception ==
Though the film's box office was only 275,000 admissions domestically, it was sold to Indonesia and Thailand. It also won the Grand Prize at the Fukuoka Asian Film Festival, established by Japanese director Shōhei Imamura in 1987.
