= Jung Ryeo-won =

Australian entertainer (born 1981)

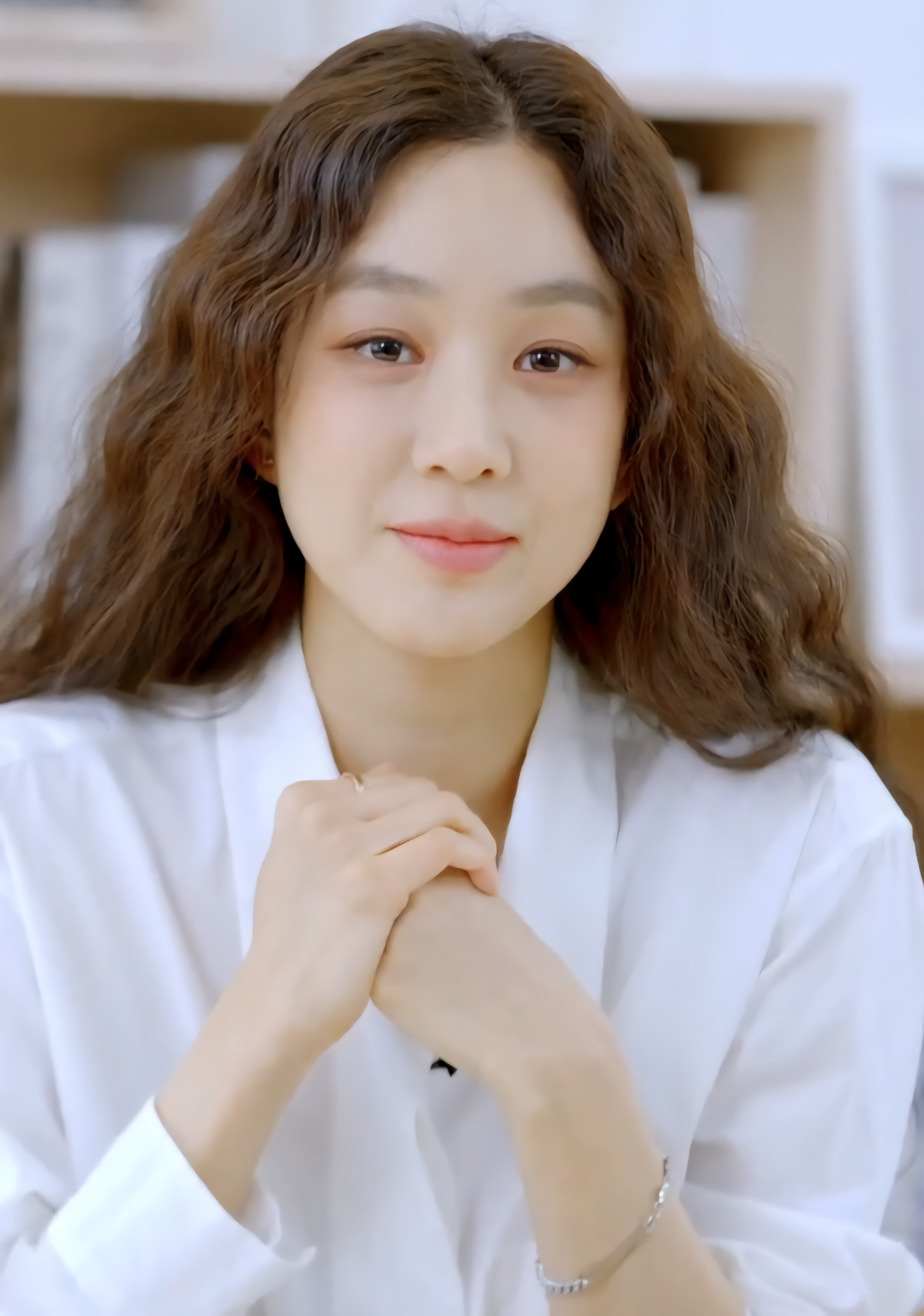
- Jung in January 2023
- Born: January 21, 1981 (age 45); Seoul, South Korea
- Other name: Yoana Jung
- Citizenship: Australia
- Education: Griffith University (International Business)
- Occupation: Actress
- Years active: 2000–present
- Agent: Blitzway Entertainment
- Musical career
- Genre: K-pop
- Instrument: Vocals
- Years active: 2000–2004
- Labels: Cream; Zam; Kiss
- Formerly of: Chakra

Korean name
- Hangul: 정려원
- RR: Jeong Ryeowon
- MR: Chŏng Ryŏwŏn
- Website: h-andent.com

Jung Ryeo-won (Korean: 정려원; born January 21, 1981) is an Australian actress and former singer based in South Korea. She began her career as a singer in the girl group Chakra. Following their disbandment of the group, she transitioned to an actress where she rose to fame in the hit television series My Name Is Kim Sam-soon (2005). She is also known for her roles in Two Faces of My Girlfriend (2007), Castaway on the Moon (2009), History of a Salaryman (2012), Wok of Love (2018) and May It Please the Court (2022).

== Early life ==
The second of three children, Jung Ryeo-won was born in 1981, and emigrated to Brisbane, Australia in 1991 with her family. By junior high school, she had adapted to the Australian way of life. She graduated from Griffith University with a major in international business.

== Career ==
=== 2000–2004: Debut with Chakra ===
While an exchange student at Korea University from Griffith University in the 2000s, Jung was discovered on the streets of Apgujeong by Lee Sang-min, changing her life and career path. She was placed in the K-pop girl group Chakra, along with Eeni, Eun and Hwangbo; their first album was released in 2000. Jung said her morale was at a low in 2002, saying she sometimes felt alienated from her fellow Koreans and felt uncomfortable with the sexy clothes she had to wear as a singer.

=== 2005–2012: Transitioning to acting ===
Chakra disbanded in 2004, and Jung pursued acting full-time. After unsuccessfully auditioning 11 times that year, she said she began doubting her decision to become an actress. In 2005, she gained recognition in the cult vampire sitcom Hello Franceska, and then made her breakthrough in the romantic comedy My Name Is Kim Sam-soon. The series was a massive success with average ratings of over 37% and 50.5% for the finale. Jung was praised for her portrayal of a fragile but good-natured character who fights for the hero's love, in the process becoming one of the few successful singer-turned-actresses in the country.

Her follow-up series Autumn Shower received low ratings, but she rebounded with Which Star Are You From?, in which she played a country bumpkin living in the mountains of Gangwon Province. She was cast in her first movie leading role as a girl with multiple personality disorder in 2007's Two Faces of My Girlfriend, and though it was not a box office hit, she won Best New Actress at the Blue Dragon Film Awards.

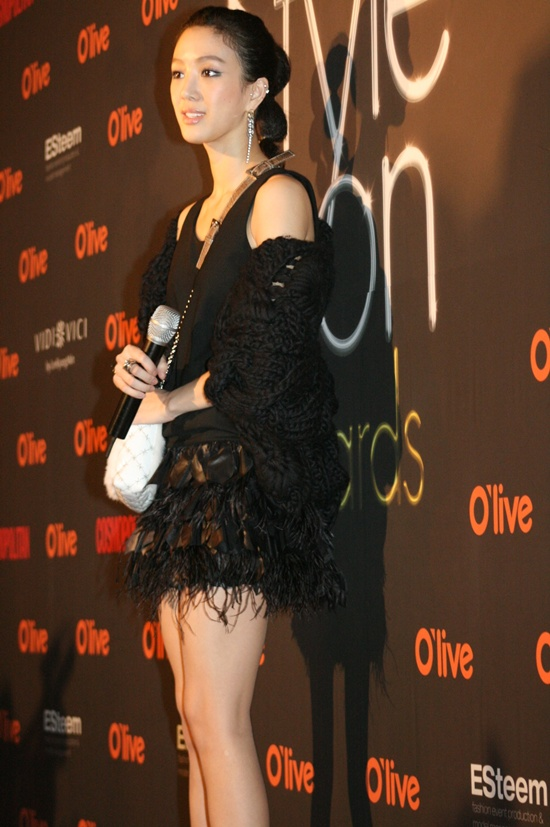
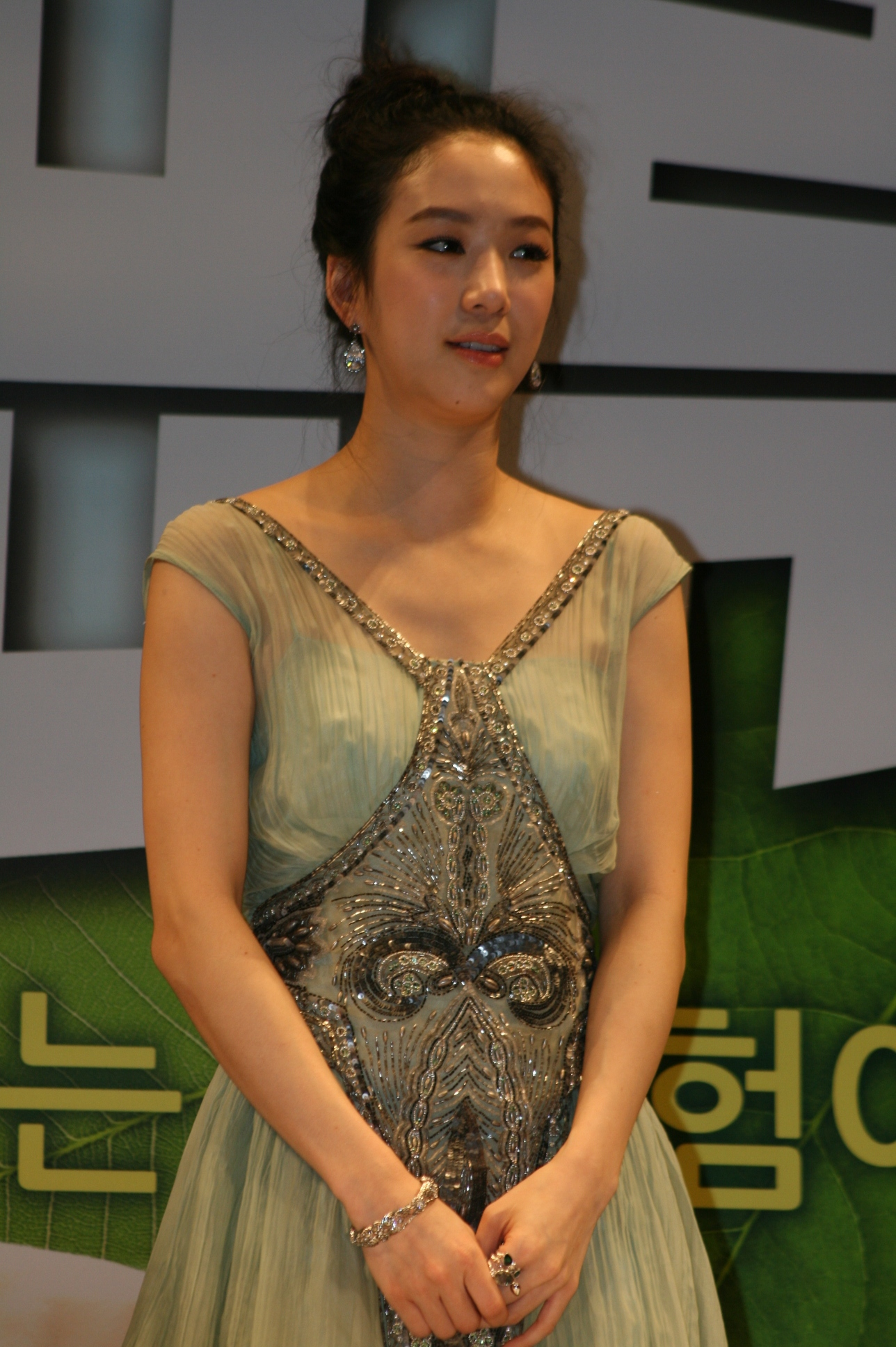
Jung in 2008 and 2009

In 2009, Jung played the title role in Princess Jamyung, her first period drama. She later appeared in Castaway on the Moon, portraying a hikikomori.

Both her 2011 big screen projects had elements of romance. She played a teacher in a small South Korean village who meets a North Korean officer in the Korean War comedy/drama In Love and War, and in Kwak Kyung-taek's melodrama Pained, she played a hemophiliac who falls for her opposite, a man with analgesia, the inability to sense physical pain.

Jung began 2012 by starring as the heroine in the quirky series History of a Salaryman. Playing one of the most unusual female characters in Korean drama history, she delivered a fun, no-holds-barred performance as a red-haired, constantly swearing, selfish, reckless, rich snob, but injected heart and raw emotion into a character that could've otherwise been very unlikable. Critics and audiences were impressed with her performance, and her series nabbed the top spot on the Monday and Tuesday primetime ratings lineup while she later won a Top Excellence Award at the SBS Drama Awards.

She then starred in Never Ending Story, a romantic comedy about two people diagnosed with terminal illnesses who decide to spend their remaining time together preparing for death. In June 2012, Jung's contract with Won Entertainment expired and she signed with Bae Yong-joon's agency, KeyEast. Later that year, she played an idealistic screenwriter in The King of Dramas.

=== 2013–2017: Acting setback ===
In January 2013, Jung unveiled her official website, through which she hoped to connect with her fans. Messages from the actress are uploaded in the "From rw" section. She then reunited with Pained costar Kwon Sang-woo in the medical drama Medical Top Team, playing a charismatic and ambitious thoracic surgeon.

Jung next played an impatient and irresponsible radio producer in the cable series Bubble Gum in 2015; she and co-star Lee Dong-wook had previously appeared together in the 2003 sitcom Do the Right Thing. In 2017, she starred in the legal procedural drama, Witch at Court, playing a highly ambitious prosecutor who speaks her mind and is known for her aggressive investigation tactics. For her portrayal, she received the Top Excellence Award at the 2017 KBS Drama Awards.

=== 2018–present: Return to television and continued work ===
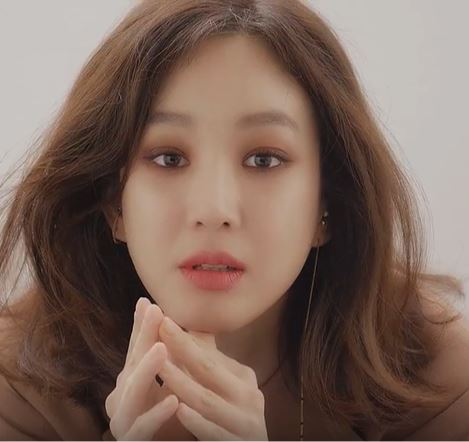
Jung for Marie Claire Korea in 2018

In 2018, Jung starred in the black comedy Gate. She then starred in the SBS' gastronomy drama Wok of Love.

In 2019, Jung starred in the legal television series Prosecutor Civil War.

In September 2020, Jung's contract with KeyEast expired. She subsequently signed with H & Entertainment. In July 2022, Jung renewed her contract with H & Entertainment.

== Other activities ==
=== Art ===
Jung published Ryeo-won's Sketchbook in 2007, which contained her drawings and writings about her Christian faith. Though she hadn't received formal instruction in the fine arts, Jung enjoyed expressing herself through drawing in her spare time. Two of her pieces of art were sold at a charity auction in 2012.

=== Hosting ===
In March 2014, Jung began hosting Art Star Korea on cable channel StoryOn, an audition program/reality show featuring contemporary artists. She also participated in the program Living Together (살아보니 어때).

=== Philanthropy ===
On February 10, 2023, Jung donated 50 million won to help the 2023 Turkey–Syria earthquake, by donating money through World Vision.

== Filmography ==
=== Film ===
Year	Title	Role	Notes	Ref.
2002	Emergency Act 19	Chakra as themselves	Cameo appearance	
2005	My Boyfriend Is Type B	Bu-young		
2007	Two Faces of My Girlfriend	A-ni / Ha-ni / Yu-ri		
2009	Castaway on the Moon	Kim Jung-yeon		
2011	In Love and War	Seol-hee		
2011	Pained	Dong-hyun		
2012	Never Ending Story	Oh Song-kyung		
2018	Gate	So-eun		
2022	Woman in a White Car	Do Gyoung	Premiered at 26th BIFAN	

=== Television series ===
Year	Title	Role	Ref.
2002	Saxophone and Chapssaltteok	Park Ja-nam	
2003	Drama City: "I Met Her at the Swimming Pool"	Hee-jin	
2003	Do the Right Thing	Ryeo-won	
2003	Argon	Kwon Soo-hyun	
2004	Father of the Sea	Joo-hong	
2004	Banjun Drama: "Exclusive Love"		
2005	Hello Franceska	Elizabeth	
2005	Banjun Drama: "Get That Girl"		
2005	Banjun Drama: "To Go Bungee Jump"		
2005	MBC Best Theater: "Magic Power of Alcohol"		
2005	My Name Is Kim Sam-soon	Yoo Hee-jin	
2005	Autumn Shower	Park Yeon-seo	
2006	Which Star Are You From	Kim Bok-shil / Lee Hye-soo / Lee Hae-rim	
2009	Ja Myung Go	Princess Jamyung	
2012	History of a Salaryman	Baek Yeo-chi	
2012	The King of Dramas	Lee Go-eun	
2013	Medical Top Team	Seo Joo-young	
2015	Bubble Gum	Kim Haeng-ah	
2017	Witch at Court	Ma Yi-deum	
2018	Wok of Love	Dan Se-woo	
2019	Diary of a Prosecutor	Cha Myeong-joo	
2024	The Midnight Romance in Hagwon	Seo Hye-jin	
TBA	The Couple Are Playing	Yoon Hye-ja	

=== Web series ===
Year	Title	Role	Ref.
2022	May It Please the Court	Noh Chak-hee	

=== Music video appearances ===
Year	Title	Artist
2008	"One"	Epik High
2010	"As a Man"	Gummy
2011	"Can't Be Crazy"	Alex Chu
2015	"Lost in Perspective"	Nell

== Discography ==
=== Soundtrack appearances ===
List of soundtrack appearances, showing year released, selected chart positions, and name of the album
Title	Year	Peak chart positions	Album
Title	Year	KOR	Album
"Wedding Song" (with Uhm Tae-woong)	2012	—	Never Ending Story OST
"—" denotes releases that did not chart or were not released in that region.

== Bibliography ==
Year	Title	Publisher	ISBN	Ref.
2007	Ryeowon's Sketchbook	Duranno Publishing	ISBN 9788953109209	

== Awards and nominations ==
Name of the award ceremony, year presented, category, nominee of the award, and the result of the nomination
Award ceremony	Year	Category	Nominee / Work	Result	Ref.
APAN Star Awards	2018	Top Excellence Award, Actress in a Miniseries	Witch at Court	Nominated	
Baeksang Arts Awards	2008	Best New Actress – Film	Two Faces of My Girlfriend	Nominated	
Baeksang Arts Awards	2012	Best Actress – Film	Pained	Nominated	
Blue Dragon Film Awards	2007	Best New Actress	Two Faces of My Girlfriend	Won	
Blue Dragon Series Awards	2023	Best Actress	May It Please the Court	Nominated	
Bucheon International Fantastic Film Festival	2022	Korean Fantastic Actress	The Woman in a White Car	Won	
Buil Film Awards	2009	Best New Actress	Castaway on the Moon	Nominated	
KBS Drama Awards	2017	Best Couple Award	Jung Ryeo-won (with Yoon Hyun-min); Witch at Court	Won	
KBS Drama Awards	2017	Top Excellence Award, Actress	Witch at Court	Won	
KBS Drama Awards	2017	Excellence Award, Actress in a Miniseries	Witch at Court	Nominated	
Korea Drama Awards	2012	Top Excellence Award, Actress	History of a Salaryman	Nominated	
MBC Drama Awards	2005	Excellence Award, Actress	My Name Is Kim Sam-soon	Won	
MBC Drama Awards	2006	PD Award	Which Star Are You From	Won	
MBC Drama Awards	2013	Top Excellence Award, Actress in a Miniseries	Medical Top Team	Nominated	
MBC Entertainment Awards	2005	Excellence Award, Actress in a Variety Show	Section TV	Won	
Premiere Rising Star Asian Awards	2008	Best New Actress	Two Faces of My Girlfriend	Won	
SBS Drama Awards	2009	Excellence Award, Actress in a Serial Drama	Princess Jamyung	Nominated	
SBS Drama Awards	2012	Top 10 Stars	History of a Salaryman / The King of Dramas	Won	
SBS Drama Awards	2012	Top Excellence Award, Actress in a Miniseries	History of a Salaryman / The King of Dramas	Won	
SBS Drama Awards	2018	Top Excellence Award, Actress in a Monday-Tuesday Drama	Wok of Love	Nominated	
Style Icon Awards	2008	Fashionista Award	Jung Ryeo-won	Won	
