= Chakra (group) =

South Korean girl group

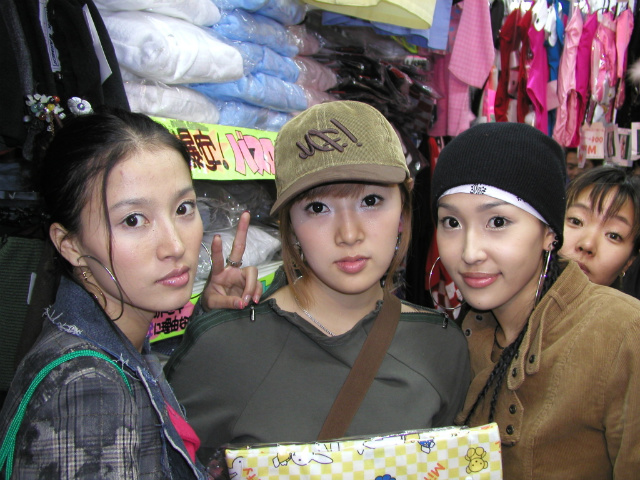
- Left to the right: Hwangbo, Eun, and Bona

Background information
- Origin: South Korea
- Genres: K-pop; dance
- Years active: 2000–2006
- Labels: Cream Records; Zam; Kiss
- Past members: Hwangbo; Bona; Eun; Ryeowon; Eani

Chakra (Korean: 샤크라) was a South Korean girl group that debuted in 2000 with four members: Hwangbo, Eun, Ryeowon, and Eani. Following the release of their first album, the group won Best New Artist at several major South Korean music awards.

After Eani left the group in 2001, the group introduced new member Bona in 2002. Chakra ultimately released three more albums and disbanded in 2006.

== History ==
=== 2000: Debut and popularity gain ===
Chakra officially debuted on February 26, 2000, at Music Camp with their first single Han, immediately calling attention, due to its Indian music concept. In March of the year the group released their first solo album titled "Come A Come" with singles titled Come A Come, Hey You and Sign of Love. The album was a success and sold +162,251 copies that led them to win many rookie awards in South Korea, including the SBS Music Awards, the Golden Disk Awards and the Mnet Asian Music Awards. That same year, Chakra released their special Christmas album entitled "Ringing Jingle Bells" with the main ballad single "Lonely Christmas".

=== 2001–2003: Peak, increase in popularity and line-up changes ===
In 2001, the group reached its peak when they released their second album "Chakra'Ca", along with the main single "End". It became their first #1 album in South Korea. The main theme focused on African music as the main concept of the album. The album sold +86,635 copies and won in the category of Best Singer dressed at the SBS Music Awards. The other success of this album was "Oh My Boy". At the time it was already very difficult to finance the group, due to a scam that happened to a new company called "Kiss Entertainment". In this process, Eani decided to leave the group at the end of 2001. They introduced a new member, Bona, in 2002.

In 2002 they released their third album "Chakra" with the lead single "Come Back".

In 2003, they released their last album, "Tomato" along with the first single From Me To You, which was a success. The album sold 23,450 copies and at the end of the year, Chakra won again in the Best Dance category at the SBS Music Awards, from this album there are other famous songs like "True Love In This World Is A Live" and the ballad "Why Im The Only One".

=== 2004–2006: Line-up changes, planned fifth album and disbandment ===
After the end of the promotions of the last album in 2004, Ryeo-won left Chakra to continue her career as an actress.

In 2005, it was planned to release a new album and do new activities, but the album could not be released due to the company's financial difficulties. Chakra members also suffered a lot of difficulties at this time, and the audience was almost indifferent to the actions of this Chakra trio; this caused Eun to leave the group. At the time, only HwangBo and Bona remained as members of Chakra.

Chakra was officially disbanded in 2006 as remaining two members left the agency.

== Former members ==
- Hwangbo (황보): Leader, Main Rapper, Main Vocalist, Face of the Group (1999–2006)
- Bona (보나): Main Vocalist (2001–2006)
- Ryeowon (려원): Main Dancer, Vocalist, Center (2000–2004)
- Eun (은): Maknae, Lead Rapper, Vocalist (2000–2005)
- Eani (에아니): Leader, Lead Dancer, Lead Rapper, Vocalist, Visual (1999–2001)

== Discography ==
=== Studio albums ===
| Title | Album details | Peak chart positions | Sales |
| Title | Album details | KOR | Sales |
|---|---|---|---|
| Come A Come | Released: March 2, 2000; Label: A&B Production, Cream Records; Format: CD, cassette | 6 | KOR: 162,251+ |
| Chakra'ca | Released: March 8, 2001; Label: Jam Entertainment, Cream Records; Format: CD, cassette | 10 | KOR: 85,351+ |
| Chakra | Released: October 10, 2002; Label: Jam Entertainment, Universal; Format: CD, cassette | 14 | KOR: 31,894+ |
| Tomato | Released: August 21, 2003; Label: Sony Music; Format: CD, cassette | 13 | KOR: 23,450+ |

== Awards ==
| Year | Awards |
|---|---|
| 2000 | SBS Music Awards: Best Female Rookie |
| 2000 | Golden Disk Awards: Best Female Rookie |
| 2000 | Mnet Asian Music Awards: Best New Group |
| 2001 | SBS Music Awards: Popular Dressed Singer Award |
| 2002 | SBS Music Awards: Best Dance Award |
| 2003 | SBS Music Awards: Best Dance Award |
