= Diary of a Prosecutor =

2019 South Korean television series

- Promotional poster
- Also known as: War of Prosecutors
- Hangul: 검사내전
- Lit.: Prosecutor Civil War
- RR: Geomsanaejeon
- MR: Kŏmsanaejŏn
- Genre: Legal drama
- Created by: Park Yeon-seon
- Based on: Prosecutor Civil War by Kim Woong
- Developed by: JTBC
- Written by: Lee Hyun; Seo Ja-yeon
- Directed by: Lee Tae-gon
- Starring: Lee Sun-kyun; Jung Ryeo-won; Lee Sung-jae; Kim Kwang-kyu; Lee Sang-hee; Jeon Sung-woo
- Country of origin: South Korea
- Original language: Korean
- No. of episodes: 16

Production
- Producer: Oh Nam-seok
- Running time: 60 minutes
- Production company: S-PEACE

Original release
- Network: JTBC
- Release: December 16, 2019 – February 11, 2020

Diary of a Prosecutor (Korean: 검사내전; RR: Geomsanaejeon) is a 2019 South Korean television series starring Lee Sun-kyun, Jung Ryeo-won, Lee Sung-jae, Kim Kwang-kyu, Lee Sang-hee and Jeon Sung-woo. Based on an essay by prosecutor Kim Woong, it aired on JTBC on Mondays and Tuesdays at 21:30 (KST) from December 16, 2019, to February 11, 2020.

== Synopsis ==
The story follows the daily lives of overworked prosecutors in the fictional city of Jinyoung, South Korea.

== Cast ==
=== Main ===
- Lee Sun-kyun as Lee Sun-woong

The narrator of the story. Sun-woong is a passionate prosecutor of Criminal Unit 2, who entered the prosecution ten years ago. He comes from a wealthy background and has been acquainted with Myung-joo since university, though the latter dislikes him for being unaware of how privileged he is. He is often in disagreement with Myung-joo after she becomes his colleague.

- Jung Ryeo-won as Cha Myung-joo

Formerly a successful prosecutor in Seoul, Myung-joo has no choice but to move to Jinyoung and work at the District Prosecutors' Office until she can go back to the capital. She was Sun-woong's junior at university, but she entered the prosecution one year earlier than him. She tends not to spend useless time on cases, and is thus considered careless by some of her colleagues.

- Lee Sung-jae as Jo Min-ho

Chief of Jinyoung District Prosecutor's Office's Criminal Unit 2, Min-ho has been a prosecutor for 18 years. He cannot bear that his team keeps coming second in the office. Following an incident in Seoul, he succeeds in convincing her of joining his unit and hopes that her arrival will raise his team's results.

- Kim Kwang-kyu as Hong Jong-hak

A prosecutor with 14 years of experience.

- Lee Sang-hee as Oh Yoon-jin

A working mother who has been a prosecutor for 4 years.

- Jeon Sung-woo as Kim Jung-woo

The youngest prosecutor of Criminal Unit 2. Myung-joo becomes his mentor soon after settling in Jinyoung, replacing Sun-woong. Jung-woo enjoys going on dates, but his workload usually prevents him from doing so. He doesn't have any real passion for his job, and only decided to become a prosecutor because the profession is well-regarded by others.

=== Supporting ===
- Baek Hyun-joo as Jang Man-ok

An investigator with 30 years of experience who usually works closely with Sun-woong.

- Ahn Chang-hwan as Lee Jeong-hwan

An investigator with 8 years of experience who is appointed to Myung-joo's office.

- Ahn Eun-jin as Seong Mi-ran

An assistant with 3 years of experience who is very quiet and only speaks when necessary.

- Jung Jae-sung as Kim In-joo

A prosecutor with 24 years of experience, and the head of the branch.

- Kim Yong-hee as Chief Nam

A prosecutor with 18 years of experience who entered the prosecution the same year as Min-ho.

- Shin Cheol-jin as Ryu-jin
- Park Sung-yeon as Kang Young-hee
- Cha Soon-bae as Choi Tae-joong, a lawyer.
- Kwak Ja-young as Lee Soon-chul, a shaman.
- Son Kyung-won as Kim Young-chun, an industrial worker.

== Production ==
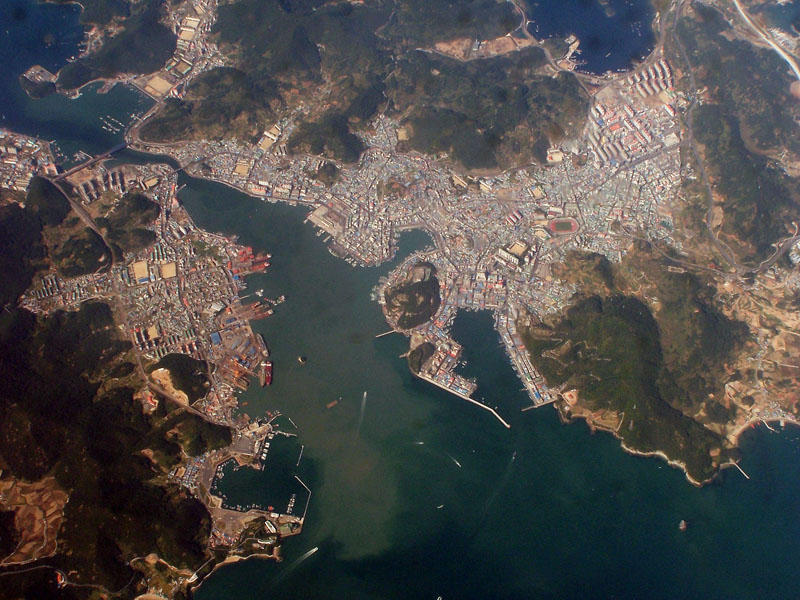
Aerial photo of Tongyeong where filming took place.

Screenwriter Park Yeon-seon, who created the series, and director Lee Tae-gon previously worked together on the television series Hello, My Twenties! (2016) and its sequel Hello, My Twenties! 2 (2017).

The first script reading took place in July 2019 at JTBC Building in Sangam-dong, Seoul, South Korea.

=== Filming and promotion ===
Filming began on August 24, 2019, and wrapped up on January 22, 2020. Scenes taking place in the fictional city of Jinyoung were filmed in Tongyeong, in South Gyeongsang Province, where more than 150 members of the cast and crew resided during the five months of filming.

The series showcase took place at Imperial Palace Seoul on December 16, 2019, a few hours before the premiere, in presence of the six main actors.

== Original soundtrack ==
Diary of a Prosecutor OST

Soundtrack album by Various Artists
- Released: 2020
- Genre: Soundtrack
- Languages: Korean; English
- Labels: Mirror Ball Music; Studio FAME

=== Part 1 ===
Released on February 4, 2020
No.	Title	Lyrics	Music	Artist	Length
1.	"Fog Blues" (물안개 블루스)	Kim Young-min; Lee Jae-jin	Kim Young-min	Young Tak	3:24
2.	"Fog Blues" (Bossa)	Kim Young-min; Lee Jae-jin	Kim Young-min	Young Tak	3:21
Total length:					6:45

=== Part 2 ===
Released on February 7, 2020
No.	Title	Lyrics	Music	Artist	Length
1.	"Is It Okay" (괜찮을까)	Namgoong Jin-young; Jung So-ri; Lee Jae-jin	Jung So-ri; Namgoong Jin-young	Namgoong Jin-young	3:06
2.	"Is It Okay" (Bossa)	Namgoong Jin-young; Jung So-ri; Lee Jae-jin	Jung So-ri; Namgoong Jin-young	Namgoong Jin-young	4:35
Total length:					7:41

=== Part 3 ===
Released on February 10, 2020
No.	Title	Lyrics	Music	Artist	Length
1.	"As The Wind Blows" (바람이 부는 대로)	Xeuda	Xeuda	Xeuda	3:15
2.	"We Are Still" (여전히 우리는)	Kim Ho-jung	Kim Ho-jung; Kim Young-min	Ahn Hye-jin	3:54
Total length:					7:09

== Viewership ==
Diary of a Prosecutor : South Korea viewers per episode (thousands)

Season	Episode number																Average
Season	1	2	3	4	5	6	7	8	9	10	11	12	13	14	15	16	Average
1	1186	992	953	895	740	743	698	772	730	851	643	807	620	810	711	874	814

Source: Audience measurement performed nationwide by Nielsen Media Research.

Average TV viewership ratings
Ep.	Original broadcast date	Average audience share (AGB Nielsen)	
Ep.	Original broadcast date	Nationwide	Seoul
1	December 16, 2019	5.042%	5.029%
2	December 17, 2019	4.996%	5.089%
3	December 23, 2019	4.685%	4.951%
4	December 24, 2019	4.238%	4.798%
5	January 6, 2020	3.588%	3.681%
6	January 7, 2020	3.810%	3.921%
7	January 13, 2020	3.203%	3.328%
8	January 14, 2020	3.836%	3.865%
9	January 20, 2020	3.214%	3.334%
10	January 21, 2020	3.684%	3.286%
11	January 27, 2020	2.73%	3.134%
12	January 28, 2020	3.479%	3.778%
13	February 3, 2020	2.981%	3.314%
14	February 4, 2020	4.004%	4.135%
15	February 10, 2020	3.289%	3.366%
16	February 11, 2020	4.208%	4.492%
Average		3.812%	3.969%
In the table above, the blue numbers represent the lowest ratings and the red numbers represent the highest ratings.; This drama aired on a cable channel/pay TV which normally has a relatively smaller audience compared to free-to-air TV/public broadcasters (KBS, SBS, MBC and EBS).
