= Hwangbo =

South Korean singer and television personality (born 1980)

- Hwangbo in November 2026
- Born: Hwangbo Hye-jeong; August 16, 1980 (age 46); Seoul, South Korea
- Other name: Estella
- Education: University of Seoul (Film & Theater)
- Occupations: Singer; rapper; television personality
- Years active: 1999–2013, 2016–present
- Agent: YGKPlus
- Musical career
- Genres: K-pop; hip-hop; ballad; dance
- Years active: 1999–2010
- Label: Shimty Company

Korean name
- Hangul: 황보혜정
- Hanja: 皇甫惠貞
- RR: Hwangbo Hyejeong
- MR: Hwangbo Hyejŏng

Signature
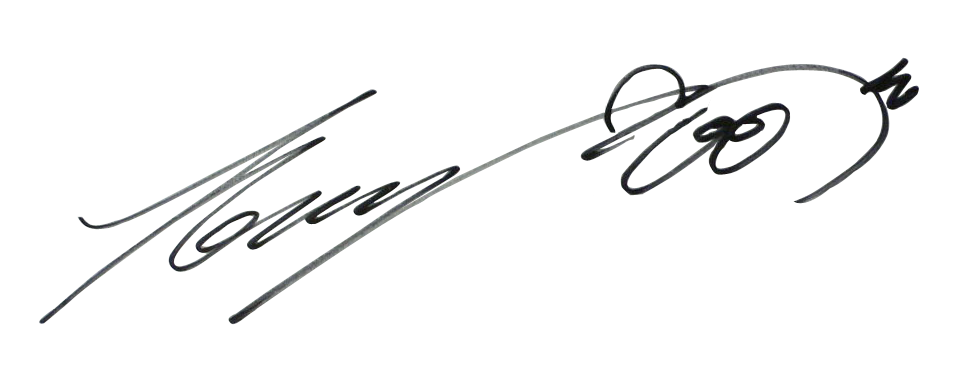

Hwangbo Hye-jeong (Korean: 황보혜정; born on 16 August 1980), better known as Hwangbo, is a South Korean singer, rapper and television personality. She debuted in 1999 as a rapper in the group Bros, before joining the K-pop girl group Chakra in 2000. After Chakra disbanded in 2006, Hwangbo released the solo album Lady In Black in 2007. She has acted in South Korean dramas including Between Miss and Ma'am (2004) and Could Love Become Money (2012). She was also a cast member on the variety shows We Got Married (2008) and Infinite Girls (2008–2013).

== Career ==
=== 1999: Pre-debut ===
While working at a pasta restaurant, Hwangbo was discovered by producer and singer Lee Sang-min. Prior to her official debut, she trained under Lee and performed as part of his project group Bros in 1999.

=== 2000–2006: Debut with Chakra ===
In 2000, Hwangbo debuted as a vocalist and rapper in the girl group Chakra, later becoming the group's leader. During this period, she also appeared on variety programs such as X-Man and Love Letter, where her straightforward demeanor earned her the nickname "General" (장군) in the Korean entertainment industry. Following Chakra's disbandment in 2006, Hwangbo began participating in charity concerts and volunteer activities alongside Compassion Band, a volunteer music group of Compassion sponsors formed in 2006 that included artists such as Shim Tae-yoon and Song Eun-i.

=== 2007–2010: Solo music career and variety shows ===
Hwangbo released her debut solo studio album, Lady in Black, in March 2007, featuring the lead single "Sorry for the Tears".

In May 2008, she joined the Munhwa Broadcasting Corporation (MBC) reality show We Got Married, where she was paired with SS501 leader Kim Hyun-joong. The pair won the Best Couple Award at the 2008 MBC Entertainment Awards before departing the program in December 2008 due to scheduling conflicts. That same year, she released the digital single Gift for Him, which included the Tecktonik-inspired dance track "Get Hot" (뜨거워져), choreographed and remixed by Koo Jun-yup, as well as the song "Mature".

On August 18, 2009, Hwangbo released the extended play R2song in South Korea, following an earlier digital release of its title track in the United Kingdom on August 7, 2009. The single also appeared in remixed versions produced by Postino. In late October 2010, she followed up with the digital single "I'm Still Beautiful".

Alongside her music releases, Hwangbo was a regular cast member on the first season of MBC Every 1's Infinity Girls from 2008 to 2009, and hosted programs including Nodaji, Finding Delicious, and Human Mentor. In 2010, she co-hosted Midnight Idols alongside Kim Hyung-jun, Kim Chang-ryul, Eun Ji-won, and Kim Sung-soo.

=== 2011–2015: Acting and business ventures ===
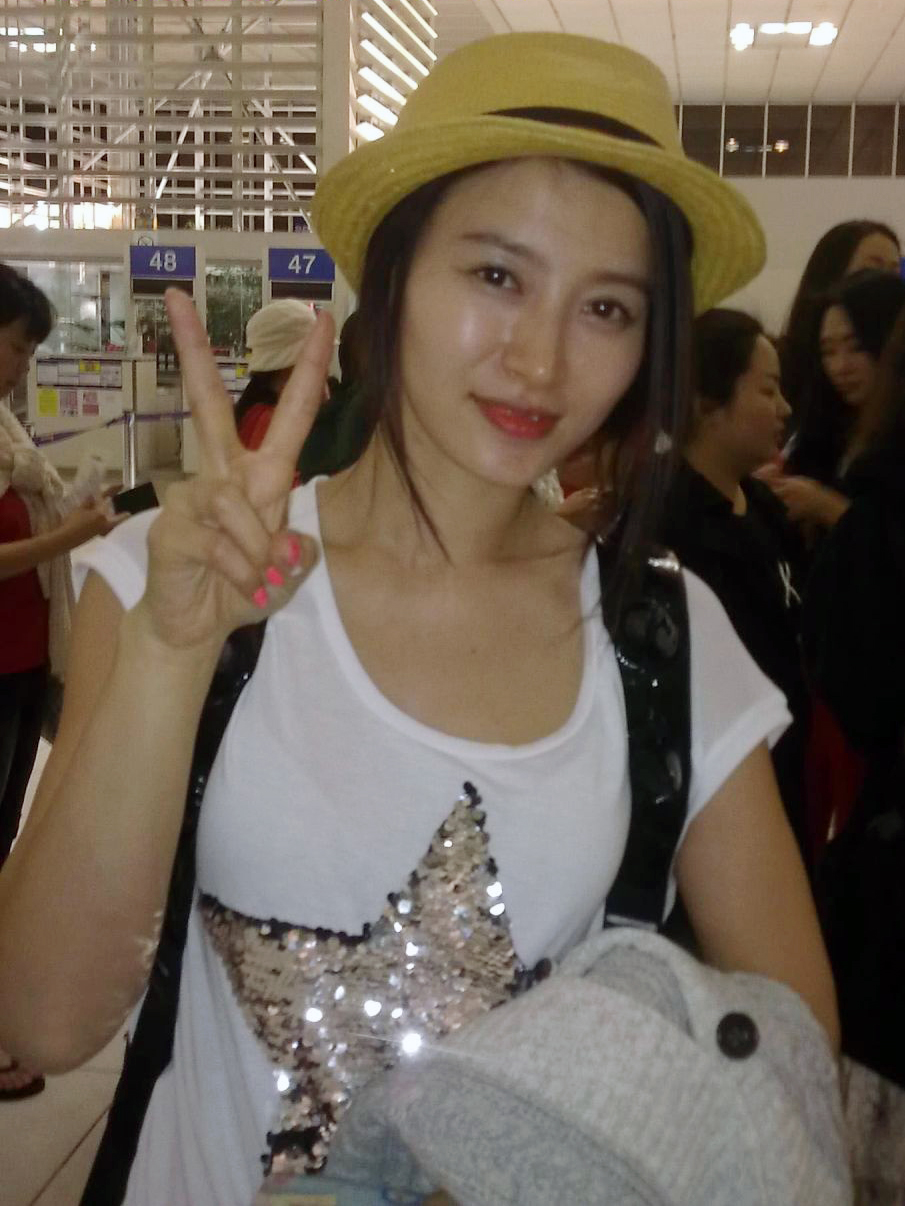
Hwangbo in 2012

In 2011, Hwangbo appeared in the SBS Plus sitcom Oh My God and made her stage musical debut in Nunsensation in late 2011. In 2012, she joined the cast of the MBN drama Can Love Become Money? and appeared on Infinity Girls Season 3.

During her hiatus from regular broadcast appearances, Hwangbo launched the online women's clothing store Bogosipda in November 2014 and opened the café Mwapungchweo in Seoul's Mapo District.

=== 2016–present: Return to broadcasting and stage ===
After a three-year hiatus, Hwangbo resumed modeling which included appearances at Seoul Fashion Week and returned to television variety shows, pairing with Nam Bo-ra on the JTBC4 reality program Secret Unnie in August 2018.

Hwangbo in 2019

In the early 2020s, she was active in radio, serving as a regular guest on SBS Power FM's Kim Young-chul's Power FM (2020–2021) and Cultwo Show (2022–2023). In 2023, she joined the cast of the MBN celebrity tennis variety program Tomorrow's Winning Shot.

In 2025, Hwangbo returned to regular reality television as a main cast member on the third season of the KBS Joy and KBS2 dating program Pursuing Old Encounters. In November 2026, she returned to musical theatre for the first time in over a decade, starring as Seong Sang-wol in the musical Private's Letter (Korean: 이등병의 편지) at the Nonsan Art Center.

== Philanthropy ==
Hwangbo has been a longtime sponsor and volunteer with Compassion Korea since 2007, performing in benefit concerts and child-sponsorship advocacy campaigns as a member of its volunteer performing group, Compassion Band. Through Compassion, she has traveled abroad on field visits to meet and volunteer with sponsored children, including trips to Bangladesh in May 2008 and the Philippines in June 2011, and has participated in international charity performances, including Compassion Band's 2009 United States tour. She also joined the group's relief and advocacy efforts following the 2010 Haiti earthquake and donated personal items to Compassion's charity bazaars for underprivileged children.

Outside of Compassion, Hwangbo has participated in numerous charity bazaars and benefit performances. In May 2018, she joined other entertainers in hosting a charity bazaar in Seongnam that donated ₩16.15 million in proceeds to the Miral Welfare Foundation to support medical treatment for children with disabilities, and later that year performed at a year-end charity concert and auction donating all proceeds to local causes.

== Personal life ==
From 2012 to 2014, Hwangbo lived in Hong Kong, where she attended a language school and supported herself by working at restaurants and as a part-time commercial model before returning to Seoul. She is a Christian.

== Discography ==
=== Studio albums ===
Title	Album details	Peak chart positions	Sales
Title	Album details	KOR	Sales
Lady in Black	Released: 3 March 2007; Label: Fantom Entertainment; Format: CD, cassette; Track listing: 1. Prologue; 2. Alone; 3. 연애할까요; 4. 아픈 말 5. Chance; 6. 거울; 7. 사랑이 변하니; 8. 눈물도 미안해서; 9. 거품; 10. 부탁해; 11. It Girl; 12. 소매; 13. Goodbye	—	—N/a
"—" denotes release did not chart.

=== Singles ===
Title	Year	Peak chart positions	Album
Title	Year	KOR	Album
"Sorry for the Tears"	2007	—N/a	Lady in Black
"Getting Hot" (뜨거워져)	2008	—N/a	Non-album singles
"Words I Can't Believe" (믿을 수 없는 말)	2009	—N/a	Non-album singles
"R2Song" (아리송)	2009	—N/a	R2Song single album
"Still Beautiful"	2010	64	Non-album single
Chart data not available prior to 2010.

== Filmography ==
=== Films ===
Year	Title	Role	Ref.
2003	Love Impossible	Seong Hye-mi	

=== Television series ===
Year	Title	Role	Ref.
2004	Between Miss and Ma'am	Hye-jeong	
2011	Oh My God	New wife	
2012	Can Love Become Money	Gwak Seong-ran	

=== Television shows ===
Year	Title	Role	Ref.
2007	Make It Beauty (메이크 잇 뷰티)	Host	
2008-2009	Infinite Girls Season 1	Cast member	
2008	We Got Married Season 1	Cast member (with Kim Hyun-joong)	
2008	Law of Inflexibility (연애 불변의 법칙) Season 6	Host	
2009	Nodaji (노다지)	Cast member	
2010-2013	Infinite Girls Season 3	Cast member	
2016	Human Documentary People Are Good (휴먼다큐 사람이 좋다)	Subject of 4 December episode	
2018	Secret Unnie (비밀언니)	Cast member (with Nam Bo-ra)	
2023	Tomorrow's Winning Shot (내일은 위닝샷)	Player	
2025	Pursuing Old Encounters Season 3 (오래된 만남 추구)	Cast	

=== Web series ===
Year	Title	Role	Ref.
2022	Office Cooking	Hwangdo	

=== Stage musicals ===
Year	Title	Role	Ref.
2011-2012	Nun Sensation (넌센세이션)	Sister Robert Anne	
2026	Private's Letter (이등병의 편지)	Seong Sang-wol	

=== Radio shows ===
Year	Title	Role	Notes	Ref.
2020–2021	Kim Young-chul's Power FM	Regular guest		
2022–2023	Cultwo Show	Regular guest	14.00-16.00PM KST	

== Awards ==
Year	Award	Category	Work	Result	Ref.
2008	Korean Entertainment Arts Awards	Best Dancer-Singer	"Getting Hot"	Won	
2008	MBC Entertainment Awards	Best Brand Award (with We Got Married cast and crew)	We Got Married	Won	
2008	MBC Entertainment Awards	Best Couple Award (with Kim Hyun-joong)	We Got Married	Won	
2009	Korea Culture and Entertainment Awards	K-pop Division Award	—N/a	Won	
