= Sechs Kies discography =

Band discography

- Studio albums: 6
- EPs: 1
- Live albums: 1
- Compilation albums: 4
- Singles: 9
- Music videos: 17
- Musical album: 1

The South Korean boy band Sechs Kies has released six studio albums, one extended play, four compilation albums, one live album, one musical album, and several singles.

In August 2000, DSP was investigated by the police for allegations of tax evasion, embezzlement, and unequal contracts. DSP was cleared of suspicion. On the other hand, the National Tax Service conducted a tax audit of the corporation and collected additional hundreds of millions of won from it. So there are suspicions that the album sales were underreported in the purpose of tax evasion

The physical sales of SechsKies' albums remain unclear not only because of DSP's under-reporting but also because the official records do not exist for the first two albums. The Recording Industry Association of Korea (hereafter, RIAK)'s official website currently only shows album sales data from the year 1999. 한국영상음반협회 (The Korea Video Record Association), which preceded RIAK, had only announced physical album sales records from September 1998.

The physical album sales for the first album, School Byeolgok (학원별곡), was 600,000 according to newspaper articles. Kang Sunghoon has once mentioned that the first album sold 1,200,000 copies. The second album, Welcome To The Sechskies Land, sold 700,000 copies. In 2012, the former manager of SechsKies stated that their debut album sold between 1.7 and 1.8 million copies, but this may be a combined figure for the first two albums. The third album, Road Fighter, has two separate records. The official record reported by 한국영상음반협회 (The Korea Video Record Association) is 226,569. In contrast, a news report reveals that SechsKies' third album sold more than 700,000 copies. The official sales record for SechsKies' biggest hit, Special Album, is 305,307. As this was the most successful album of SechsKies, this official record seems to be a result of under-reporting. Eun Jiwon has stated the Special album sold approximately a million copies on a TV show. The discrepancy between official and news article is also great for the fourth album, Com’Back. The official record is merely 350,128. However, according to news articles, Com’Back seems to have sold for more than 700,000 copies.

However, the above statement is also not a fact. First of all, news articles were inaccurate at that time. There were many cases of exaggerating through the media. This problem received media spotlight by being reported on MBC in 1999. DSP media was the subject for that report. Thus high sales in the article are also inaccurate. And the National Tax Service just collected additional hundreds of millions of won, didn't say that it is from underreported album sales.

== Albums ==
=== Studio albums ===
| Title | Album details | Peak positions | | | Sales |
| Title | Album details | KOR | TW | US World | Sales |
|---|---|---|---|---|---|
| School Byeolgok (학원별곡) | Released: May 14, 1997; Label: DSP Media; Formats: CD; Track list: 1. 학원별곡; 2. 연정; 3. 사나이 가는 길（폼생폼사）; 4. 확인; 5. 배신감; 6. 기억해줄래; 7. Walking In The Rain; 8. Dream Comes True; 9. 사랑 신고식; 10. 다같이 해요; 11. 연정（Remix）; 12. 사나이 가는 길（폼생폼사）（Remix） | * | * | * | KOR: 1,200,000 |
| Welcome To The Sechskies Land | Released: November 1, 1997; Label: DSP Media; Formats: CD; Track list: 1. Gate 1; 2. 미성년자 관람불가; 3. 거절의 이유; 4. Party Time; 5. 미인추방; 6. Gate 2; 7. 탈출; 8. 동급생; 9. 돌연변이; 10. 기사도; 11. Gate 3; 12. For You（사랑하는 팬들에게）; 13. Love; 14. 하얀밤에; 15. 사랑하는 너에게; 16. Gate 4; 17. 젝키의 크리스마스; 18. 말괄량이 길들이기; 19. 겨울편지; 20. Outro | * | * | * | KOR: 700,000 |
| Road Fighter | Released: July 15, 1998; Label: DSP Media; Formats: CD | * | * | * | KOR: 700,000 |
| Special Album | Released: October 30, 1998; Label: DSP Media; Formats: CD; Track list: 1. 너를 보내며; 2. Couple （커플）; 3. 네겐 보일수 없었던 세상; 4. 그대가 잠든 사이에; 5. 내맘을 알고있니; 6. Celebrate Tonight; 7. 변신; 8. 단념; 9. 기도; 10. Goodbye Party（슬픈축제）; 11. 비상; 12. Celebrate Tonight（Remix）; 13. 지금이야（Remix） | * | * | * | KOR: 1,000,000 |
| Com’Back | Released: September 9, 1999; Label: DSP Media; Formats: CD; Track list: 1. Com'Back; 2. Hunch; 3. Love Forever; 4. Sadness; 5. Smile Again（Remix）; 6. Summer In Love; 7. A+; 8. Mobius strip 9. Remember Me（Remix）; 10. Rigoletto; 11. The Gift She Left Behind; 12. Missing You; 13. Enemy; 14. Stop (그대로 멈춰); 15. Com'Back（Remix）; 16. Summer In love（Remix）; 17. Smile Again（Original）; 18. Mobius strip（Remix） | * | * | * | KOR: 700,000 |
| Another Light | Released: September 21, 2017; Label: YG Entertainment; Formats: CD, digital download; Track list: 1. Something Special; 2. Feeling; 3. Smile; 4. Need U 5. Backhug; 6. Drinking Problem; 7. Vertigo; 8. Never Again; 9. It's Been a While | 2 | 4 | 10 | KOR: 98,775 |
"—" denotes releases that did not chart or were not released in that region. "*" Gaon Chart was introduced in February 2010.

^{1} As there are no official sales records for earlier albums, estimated album sales are given

=== Compilation albums ===
| Title | Album details | Peak positions | | | | Sales |
| Title | Album details | KOR | JPN | TW | US World | Sales |
|---|---|---|---|---|---|---|
| 1020 Mix | Released: April 26, 1999; Label: DSP Media; Formats: CD; Track list: 1. Intro; 2. 커플; 3. Saddle Up (Feat.Freak Brothers); 4. Your Lover; 5. I Love To Love (Tina Charles); 6. Tu Danses Le Disco (Mr.Travolti); 7. 기사도; 8. (Ooh Aah) Just A Little Bit; 9. Fame (Patti Ravell); 10. Itsy Bitsy Teeny Weeny Yellow Polka Dot Bikini; 11. 지금이야; 12. Sexygate (Weepie); 13. I Will Be (Panama); 14. 폼생폼사; 15. 너를 보내며; 16. Intro; 17. 연정; 18. Wanna Jump (Rlc); 19. California Dreaming (High Jinx); 20. Do Wah Diddy (A La Carte); 21. Sunshine (Crichton); 22. Everybody Jam (Larkin); 23. 말괄량이 길들이기; 24. I Got A Felling (It's You)(DND Feat.Jinny); 25. Love In The First Degree(Sushi); 26. Hot Stuff (Men Of Stell); 27. Disco Burn (Nick Skitz); 28. Bam Bam Boo (Dj Costa); 29. 무모한 사랑; 30. 커플(SLOW) | * | * | * | * | KOR: 30,986 |
| Blue Note | Released: May 31, 2000; Label: DSP Media; Formats: CD; Track list: 1. Bye...; 2. 약속; 3. The Last Time; 4. Pain; 5. Walking In The Rain; 6. 너를 보내며; 7. Couple （커플）; 8. 사랑하는 너에게; 9. 예감; 10. 네겐 보일 수 없었던 세상; 11. Say; 12. 하얀밤에 | * | * | * | * | KOR: 86,900 |
| 2016 Re-ALBUM | Released: December 1, 2016; Label: YG Entertainment; Formats: CD, digital download | 2 | — | 7 | — | KOR: 82,592 |
| The 20th Anniversary | Released: April 28, 2017; Label: YG Entertainment; Formats: CD, digital download | 1 | 33 | 1 | 9 | KOR: 75,185; JPN: 2,196 |
"—" denotes releases that did not chart or were not released in that region.

=== Live albums ===
| Title | Album details | Sales |
|---|---|---|
| Sechskies Live Concert | Released: March 1, 1999; Label: DSP Media; Formats: CD; Track list: 1. Intro + Road Fighter + 기도 + 지금이야; 2. Come To Me Baby + Celebrate Tonight; 3. My Love（Eun Jiwon Rap + Kang Sunghun Solo）; 4. Betty（Lee JaiJin Solo）; 5. Last + 너를 보내며 + 커플（Couple）; 6. 약속된 운명（아마게돈）+ Flying Love（천상비애）; 7. Fake G's（절대자）; 8. 침묵 (Kim Jaeduck Solo); 9. 무모한 사랑 + 그 날까지（Together Forever）; 10. 연정 + 사나이 가는 길（폼생폼사） + 기사도 | KOR: 87,835 |

=== Musical albums ===
| Title | Album details |
|---|---|
| Ali Baba and the 40 Thieves Musical OST | Released: April 29, 1998; Label: DSP Media; Formats: CD; Track list: 1. 천년의약속1; 2. 형제가너무달라; 3. 내사랑그대여; 4. 신비한사막의나라; 5. 각오해알리바바; 6. 우리는유쾌한아라비아도둑; 7. 아이구배아파라; 8. 라이언칼의수호자; 9. 천년의약속2; 10. 침입자를잡아라; 11. 램프의요정; 12. 욕심은화를불러; 13. 환희의휘날레 |

== Extended plays ==
| Title | Album details | Peak positions | Sales |
| Title | Album details | KOR | Sales |
|---|---|---|---|
| All for You | Released: January 28, 2020; Label: YG Entertainment; Formats: CD, digital download; Track List: 1. All For You; 2. 꿈 (Dream); 3. 의미 없어 (Meaningless); 4. 제자리 (Round & Round); 5. 하늘을 걸어 (Walking in the Sky) | 2 | KOR: 42,459 |

== Singles ==
=== As a lead artist ===
| Title | Year | Peak positions | Sales | Albums |
| Title | Year | KOR | Sales | Albums |
|---|---|---|---|---|
| "School Byeolgok" (학원별곡) | 1997 | — | | School Byeolgok |
| "The Way This Guy Lives" (사나이 가는 길) | 1997 | — | | School Byeolgok |
| "Remember Me" | 1997 | — | | School Byeolgok |
| "Chivalry" (총) | 1997 | — | | Welcome to the Sechskies Land |
| "Road Fighter" | 1998 | — | | Road Fighter |
| "Reckless Love" (무모한 사랑) | 1998 | — | | Road Fighter |
| "Couple" (커플) | 1998 | 154 | | Special Album |
| "Com' Back" | 1999 | — | | Com' Back |
| "Hunch" (예감) | 1999 | — | | Com' Back |
| "Three Words" | 2016 | 1 | KOR: 616,583 | Non-album single |
| "Couple" (2016 version) | 2016 | 2 | KOR: 309,731 | 2016 Re-ALBUM |
| "Be Well" (아프지 마요) | 2017 | 1 | KOR: 436,441 | The 20th Anniversary |
| "Sad Song" (슬픈 노래) | 2017 | 14 | KOR: 108,477 | The 20th Anniversary |
| "Something Special" (특별해) | 2017 | 1 | KOR: 570,847 | Another Light |
| "Smile" (웃어줘) | 2017 | 42 | KOR: 30,640 | Another Light |
| "All for You" (올포유) | 2020 | 15 | —N/a | All for You |
| "Don't Look Back" (뒤돌아보지 말아요) | 2021 | 6 | —N/a | Non-album single |

== Other charted songs ==
| Title | Year | Peak positions | Sales | Album |
| Title | Year | KOR | Sales | Album |
|---|---|---|---|---|
| "Heartbreak (연정)" | 2016 | 39 | KOR: 58,389 | 2016 Re-ALBUM |
| "Chivalry (기사도)" | 2016 | 49 | KOR: 28,709 | 2016 Re-ALBUM |
| "Got a Feeling (예감)" | 2016 | 72 | KOR: 26,221 | 2016 Re-ALBUM |
| "Com' Back" | 2016 | 83 | KOR: 22,540 | 2016 Re-ALBUM |
| "Dear Love (사랑하는 너에게)" | 2016 | 86 | KOR: 22,033 | 2016 Re-ALBUM |
| "Reckless Love (무모한 사랑)" | 2016 | 93 | KOR: 20,236 | 2016 Re-ALBUM |
| "Road Fighter (로드 파이터)" | 2016 | 94 | KOR: 19,999 | 2016 Re-ALBUM |
| "Come to Me Baby" | 2016 | 97 | KOR: 19,185 | 2016 Re-ALBUM |

== Music videos ==
| Year | Title | Director(s) | Ref. |
|---|---|---|---|
| 1997 | School Byeolgok (학원별곡) | Unknown | |
| 1997 | The Way This Guy Lives - Pomsaengpomsa (사나이 가는 길 - 폼생폼사) | Unknown | |
| 1997 | For you | Unknown | |
| 1998 | Road Fighter | Unknown | |
| 1998 | Reckless Love (무모한 사랑) | Unknown | |
| 1998 | Letting You Go (너를 보내며) | Unknown | |
| 1998 | Couple (커플) | Unknown | |
| 1998 | Prayer (기도) | Unknown | |
| 1999 | Hunch (예감) | Unknown | |
| 1999 | Summer in love | Unknown | |
| 2000 | Thanks | Unknown | |
| 2016 | Three words (세 단어) | Unknown | |
| 2016 | Couple (커플) New Ver. | Unknown | |
| 2017 | Be Well (아프지 마요) | Unknown | |
| 2017 | Sad Song (슬픈 노래) | Wani (LIKETHAT production) | |
| 2017 | Something Special (특별해) | Oui Kim | |
| 2017 | Smile (웃어줘) | Han Sa-min | |
| 2020 | All for You | Unknown | |
| 2021 | Don't Look Back | Shin Won-ho | |

== Other appearances ==
- 1999 - 우린 하나되어 이겼어
