= 2016 Re-Album =

Re-Album

Compilation album by SechsKies
- Released: December 1, 2016
- Recorded: 2016
- Genre: K-pop; hip hop; dance-pop; R&B
- Length: 36:38
- Label: YG

SechsKies chronology
Blue Note (2000)	Re-Album (2016)	The 20th Anniversary (2017)

Singles from 2016 Re-Album
- 1. "Couple" Released: 30 November 2016

2016 Re-Album (stylised as 2016 are-ALBUM) is a compilation album by the South Korean boy band Sechs Kies. It was released on December 1, 2016, under YG Entertainment. This marks the group's first official release since their compilation album, Blue Note, in 2000. It also marked the group's first official release under YG, and the first without member Ko Ji Yong, who chose not to participate in the group's reunion activities.

== Overview ==
Due to the inaccessibility of previous Sechskies releases, YG in-house producers Rovin, Airplay, Future Bounce and Kang Ukjin, recomposed and compiled previous Sechskies songs.

The music videos were filmed during winter in Sapporo, Japan.

== Background ==
On May 11, 2016, five of the six members of Sechs Kies signed with YG Entertainment. Shortly after "Three Words" was released on October 7, 2016, marking their first comeback since their disbandment. On November 23, 2016, YG Entertainment released a teaser, revealing the album's title. The only songs performed before the official release of the album were Com' Back and Couple in the end of the year Melon music Awards.

On December 2, the album along with its music video for the lead single "Couple" were released.

== Track listing ==
No.	Title	Lyrics	Music	Length
1.	"Com' Back" (from Com' Back, 1999)	Cho Eun-hee	Cho Jin-jin	3:38
2.	"Couple" (커플) (from Special, 1998)	Jang Dae-sung	Ma Gyung-shik	4:07
3.	"Got a Feeling" (예감) (from Com' Back, 1999)	Lee Seung-ho	Yoon Il-sang	3:31
4.	"Come to Me Baby" (from Road Fighter, 1998)	Kim Young-a	Kim Seok-chan	3:42
5.	"Chivalry" (기사도) (from Welcome to the Sechskies Land, 1997)	Kim Young-a	Han Chang-hoon	3:40
6.	"Heartbreak" (연정) (from School Anthem, 1997)	Lee Seung-ho	Yoon Il-sang	3:16
7.	"Reckless Love" (무모한 사랑) (from Road Fighter, 1998)	Lee Seung-ho	Yoon Il-sang	3:17
8.	"Road Fighter" (from Road Fighter, 1998)	Kim Young-a	Lee Yoon-sang	2:58
9.	"Rise Up / School Anthem" (학원별곡) (from School Anthem, 1997)	Park Ki-young	Lee Yoon-sang	3:30
10.	"Dear Love" (사라하는 너에게) (from Welcome to the Sechskies Land, 1997)	Jang Dae-sung	Ma Gyung-shik	3:59
Total length:				36:38

Bonus track on physical edition
No.	Title	Lyrics	Music	Length
11.	"Three Words"	Tablo	Tablo, Future Bounce	4:03
Total length:				40:41

== Personnel ==
Liner credit notes as seen in the booklet of the physical album.

- Eun Jiwon – vocals, rap
- Kang Sunghun – vocals
- Kim Jaeduck – vocals, rap
- Lee Jaijin – vocals, rap
- Jang Suwon – vocals
