= Hawaiian Mission Academy =

Location
- 1438 Pensacola St. Honolulu, Hawaiʻi 96822; United States

Information
- Type: Private, Day and Boarding, College-prep
- Motto: Mental · Spiritual · Physical
- Denomination: Seventh-day Adventist Church
- Established: 1920
- Grades: K–12
- Gender: Coeducational
- Enrollment: 117 (2011-12)
- Campus type: Urban
- Colors: Blue and White
- Slogan: Making a difference for time and eternity in service for humankind and God.
- Athletics conference: ILH
- Mascot: Knight
- Accreditation: WASC; AAA
- Newspaper: Ka Elele
- Yearbook: Ka Lamaku
- Website: www.hawaiianmissionacademy.org

The Hawaiian Mission Academy (HMA) is a private coeducational day and boarding school in Honolulu, Hawaii. HMA is the only Academy that provides international dormitory housing on the island. It is a part of the Seventh-day Adventist education system, the world's second largest Christian school system.

== History ==
Educational work of the Seventh-day Adventist Church in the Hawaiian Islands started in 1895 with a boarding school for boys, under the leadership of H. H. Brand. This school was named the Anglo-Chinese Academy in 1897 when Professor and Mrs. W. E. Howell came to Honolulu to head it.

To accommodate expanding enrollment, several changes in location were made until Bethel Grammar, as it was known then, located on Keeaumoku Street, added secondary grades. Increased enrollment again called for larger quarters. In 1920 several properties on Makiki Street became the site of a combined elementary and secondary school designed to accommodate all Hawaiian Seventh-day Adventists mission schools, adopting the name Hawaiian Mission Academy.

Enrollment peaked during World War II. In 1946, the estate of former Princess Abigail Campbell Kawānanakoa property on Pensacola Street, Royal Hawaiian land, became available as a site for a new secondary school. Construction began in summer 1949, and the secondary school and its administrative offices were moved to the campus in December, 1949. The elementary school remained at the Makiki Street campus.

== Overview ==
Hawaiian Mission Academy is located 1438 Pensacola Street, 21°18′20″N 157°50′37″W, in Honolulu, Hawaii on the island of Oʻahu. It has grades 9-12 and continues its affiliation with the Seventh-day Adventist Church. It is a coeducational college preparatory private school with an average of 135 students and 14 faculty.

== Notable alumni ==
- Fernando Chui – Chief Executive of Macau
- Eun Ji-won – South Korean actor and singer, leader of SECHSKIES
- Kang Sung-hoon - South Korean actor and singer, member of SECHSKIES
- Kangnam – South Korean-Japanese singer, member of South Korean hip hop quartet M.I.B
- David Pendleton – politician, former member of the Hawaii House of Representatives
- Mary Kawena Pukui – musician, hula dancer and educator
- John Waiheʻe – politician, former Governor of Hawaii
- Lynne Kobashigawa Waiheʻe – former First Lady of Hawaii
- Diamond Garcia - politician, Minority Floor Leader and member of the Hawaii House of Representatives and Chairman of the Hawaii Republican Party

== See also ==
- List of Seventh-day Adventist secondary schools
- Seventh-day Adventist education
