= Lee Jae-jin =

Lee Jae-jin (Korean: 이재진) is a Korean name consisting of the family name Lee and the given name Jae-jin, and may also refer to:

- Lee Jae-jin (badminton) (born 1983), South Korean badminton player
- Lee Jaijin (musician, born 1979), South Korean musician and member of Sechs Kies
- Lee Jae-jin (musician, born 1991), South Korean musician and member of F.T. Island
