= Three Words =

Three Words or 3 Words may refer to:

- Three Words (book), a 2016 New Zealand comics anthology
- "Three Words" (The X-Files), a 2001 TV episode
- 3 Words, a 2009 album by Cheryl Cole
- "3 Words" (song), a 2009 song by Cheryl Cole
- "Three Words" (song), a 2016 song by Sechs Kies
- "Three Words", a 2013 song by Marcus Canty from This...Is Marcus Canty
- "Three Words", a 2002 song by No Angels from the single "Still in Love with You"

== See also ==
- "Three Words, Two Hearts, One Night", a 1995 song by Mark Collie 1995
- Three Little Words (disambiguation)
- What3words, a geolocation system
