= YG Future Strategy Office =

2018 South Korean television series

- Also known as: YG FSO
- Hangul: YG전략자료본부
- Hanja: YG戰略資料本部
- Lit.: YG Strategic Resource Center
- RR: YG jeollyak jaryo bonbu
- MR: YG chŏllyak charyo ponbu
- Genre: Sitcom; Mockumentary
- Written by: Kim Min-suk
- Directed by: Park Joon-soo
- Starring: Seungri; Yoo Byung-jae; Lee Jai-jin
- Opening theme: Remix of "Fantastic Baby" by Big Bang
- Ending theme: Flower Road by Big Bang
- Country of origin: South Korea
- Original language: Korean
- No. of seasons: 1
- No. of episodes: 8

Production
- Executive producers: Park Joon-soo; Kim Min-suk
- Running time: 20-29 minutes
- Production companies: YG Entertainment; Netflix Services Korea Ltd.

Original release
- Network: Netflix
- Release: October 5, 2018

YG Future Strategy Office (Korean: YG전략자료본부), abbreviated as YG FSO (YG전자), is a South Korean television series on Netflix starring Seungri as the head of YG Entertainment's fictional strategic resources department, with Yoo Byung-jae, Baek Young-kwang, Kim Ga-eun, Son Se-bin, and Sechs Kies' Lee Jai-jin starring as his co-workers. Various artists from YG Entertainment also appeared as guests.

The show is directed by Park Joon-soo, who produced the South Korean mockumentary show The God of Music 2, and is written by Kim Min-suk, who was one of the writers for SNL Korea.

== Synopsis ==
In order to deal with its troublemaking artists and misfits, YG Entertainment forms a new department called the Future Strategy office, with Seungri as head of the department. The show follows him and his co-workers struggling to regain the company's reputation in the midst of a crisis. The black comedy series was based loosely on YG Entertainment artists' real-life drug and sex scandals.

== Development and production ==
The show was first announced on February 22, 2018 through a press release published by Netflix.

Producer Park Joon-soo declared to have been inspired by Samsung's former Future Strategy Office, which used to be an important department of the company before it was disbanded. He went on saying that he has "been producing a series of shows that make fun of the dark sides of Korea's entertainment industry" and he thought of YG because it was "going through a dark patch" at the time.

During filming, the crew and cast were given different versions of the script in order "to make the show as realistic as possible." However, Seungri mentioned during a press conference — which took place in Seoul on October 1, 2018 — that he seldom read the scripts, wanting "to show the real [him]" as much as he could.

== Cast ==
=== Main ===
==== YG FSO team ====
- Seungri as the head and consultant of YG FSO
- Yoo Byung-jae as a staff member who runs errands for the department
- Lee Jai-jin as an employee who rarely goes to work
- Son Se-bin is an assistant of the department with calm air
- Kim Ga-eun is the financial manager of the department with a direct personality that is always "challenging" Seungri
- Park Chung-hwan as the assistant manager

==== Other regulars ====
- Baek Young-kwang as Seungri's manager and the department's bodyguard
- Choi Shin-deok as the department's bodyguard
- Jinu

=== Special appearances ===
- Yang Hyun-suk
- Blackpink
- Daesung
- Nam Tae-hyun
- Kim So-young
- Winner
- Oh Sang-jin
- Jinusean
- Park Bom
- One
- Son Se-eun
- Son Se-bin
- iKon
- Sunmi
- Chungha
- Son Na-eun
- Yoo In-na
- Lee Hi
- Lee Su-hyun

== Episodes ==
Each episode features a quote by Yang Hyun-suk, YG's chairman, which relates to the episode's story. The quotes are shown after the opening credits.

No.	Title	Original release date
1	"Family Day"	October 5, 2018
Seungri is assigned as the head of YG FSO after causing another controversy two months prior. On his first day, he and his team members are tasked to organize YG Entertainment's 3rd Family Day, which becomes difficult when Seungri fails to convince many YG artists to attend. On the day of the event, only the YG FSO members attend, aside from Jinu and Nam Tae-hyun, a former member of Winner. To show their gratitude to Yang Hyun-suk, they throw "thank you" balls at a hanging gourd with a cutout of his face, but this offends the chairman. Seungri, who came up with the idea, blames Ga-eun and this gets her fired. The next day, Seungri is reprimanded by the chairman, who reveals that he knows Seungri was behind the gourd idea. Episode quote: Parents are the happiest when children are happy. Guests: Daesung, Blackpink, Nam Tae-hyun, Kim So-young
2	"Clean YG"	October 5, 2018
YG FSO decides to start a weekly campaign called "Clean YG" in order to promote a clean image for the company. This includes an event where Byung-jae and Jai-jin, who believe that they are going on a vacation, must walk throughout the country for awareness. During an in-house broadcast, Jai-jin curses at Seungri for sending them on a cross-country walk. The chairman then calls Seungri and blames him for giving Jai-jin (who is his brother-in-law) a hard time, and everyone in the company hears the conversation. As an apology, Seungri invites YG's anti-fans in the company to reconcile with them by giving them gifts, but it does not work. He accidentally suggests that they should beat him up instead, which results to him getting bruises all over his face. Meanwhile, Byung-jae and Jai-jin unknowingly reach the North Korean border and are bombarded while they run away, but the cameraman who is with them does not survive the attack. Episode quote: I trusted you from the beginning. You belong here. Guests: Winner, Oh Sang-jin
3	"Music Business"	October 5, 2018
With YG Entertainment branching out to other fields, YG FSO becomes in charge of coming up with the strategic plan but Seungri only wants to focus on music and attempts to revive Park Bom's career. For a drama production, Chung-hwan proposes a story similar to 8 Mile, with ONE as the lead, and calls this "ONE Mile". Jinu promotes YG Sports with Son Se-eun, but runs away when he is told to act as her golf tee. Meanwhile, Seungri and Se-bin film Bom's music video at YG's restaurant, but a drunk Jai-jin disrupts the set and ruins the music video. In the end, Seungri resorts to cross-selling to promote music with the other branches. Episode quote: I don't expect you to be good at everything. So just be good at one thing. Guests: Park Bom, ONE, Son Se-eun
4	"Plan B"	October 5, 2018
Seungri begins to worry about iKON's future and initiates a Plan B, making them go through rigorous training to challenge other K-Pop idols to a showdown. Believing that they have improved, Seungri plans to send a video documenting their growth to the chairman, but this backfires when he sees that Chung-hwan has edited the video badly and has already sent it. To regain the group's image, he makes them volunteer in the construction of the new company building, which leads to the injury of some of the members. YG FSO also proposes a Plan B for Jinu by making him and Seungri join the Chinese version of Show Me the Money. Meanwhile, Jai-jin and Byung-jae are tasked to clean the chairman's car, but Byung-jae accidentally breaks its hood ornament. Episode quote: A professional should foresee the coming situation. Guests: iKON, Sunmi, Kim Chung-ha
5	"Financial Problem"	October 5, 2018
As YG FSO's funds continuously drop, Seungri rehires Ga-eun to handle the department's finances. Ga-eun tells Seungri to shell out some money from his successful ramen restaurant, but he refuses. He and Chung-hwan conduct a tour of the YG building for a few fans and a cheap VR experience with Byung-jae as G-Dragon. Feeling conned, the fans demand a refund, leaving the department broke again. The members resort to desperate measures: Ga-eun borrows money from a loan shark, Chung-hwan sells Big Bang's personal information, and Se-bin sells all her hair. They then find Seungri's stash of money in a drawer, believing that Seungri is donating it to the department. Episode quote: Money can't replace my dreams or happiness.
6	"Big Crunch"	October 5, 2018
YG FSO publishes a promotional video of the chairman's comeback as a musician, which is not true, in order to draw attention from the public. With the chairman furious, he relocates all the members (except for Seungri) to different departments who are then replaced by Kim Yu-nam, a hardworking but intimidating employee. As the former FSO members settle into their new jobs, Seungri begins to feel guilty when he sees them having a hard time. Soon, various employees in the company beg the chairman to take the members back to the FSO due to their incompetence, and the FSO team celebrates. Meanwhile, Jai-jin enlists the help of fellow Sechskies member Su-won to get his revenge on Seungri. However, his plan fails when Seungri sprays pesticide on Su-won, who is disguised as a potted plant. Episode quote: Even trees die or get hurt when moved. Guests: Kim Yu-nam, Kal So-won, Jang Su-won
7	"Dark Night"	October 5, 2018
The YG FSO members decide to plan Seungri's solo album as a form of gratitude. Se-bin bribes B.I, Seung-yoon, and a Teddy imposter into producing the music. To get funding, Young-kwang and Shin-deok are in charge of Bitcoin mining, causing a power outage in the company. While on their way to the main building, they get stuck in the elevator. Meanwhile, the others go to YG's secret bunker where Seungri discovers a dartboard with his photo as a target and a voodoo doll of him, making him feel bitter. As an apology, the members bring in A Pink's Na-eun to collaborate with him. However, Na-eun only comes to defend her sister, Se-eun, who was injured during the golf incident with Jinu. She makes Seungri act as a golf tee and hits his face with a club, leading him to be hospitalized for three weeks. Episode quote: Pity on those who do not know what to do. Guests: B.I, Kang Seung-yoon, Son Na-eun
8	"New Face"	October 5, 2018
With Seungri going to the army, the FSO members need to find a new consultant for the department. They decide to recruit Alex, a YG model, but the FSO's foreign investor scares him away when she mistakes him for a webcam model. The next day, Ok Go-woon, a YG actress, steps in as a temporary consultant since Seungri has to face the U.S. court for the webcam incident. Though accommodating at first, Go-woon turns out to be harsh and begins tormenting each member to teach them discipline. Days later, Seungri returns and tells them that the FSO will be moving into the main building, but this turns out to be a lie and all of them are fired after being reported to the chairman by Go-woon. They hold a farewell party and Seungri decides to take a last look at the office. He is given a gift containing the script for the show's second season, but with Gang Dong-won as the lead. A man then shows up at the office, but before his face is revealed, the screen cuts to the credits. Episode quote: Make tomorrow better than today. Guests: Yoo In-na, Ok Go-woon, Lee Hi, Su-hyun, Hyoni Kang

== Reception ==
At the show's press conference, Seungri announced, "YG is literally in crisis", which was later compared to YG's current real-life predicament by The Korea Times reporter, Jung Hae-myoung, at the onset of the Burning Sun scandal. It received viewer complaints about scenes of sexual harassment and racism, including one where Seungri chides a male model for not complying with a female foreign investor's request for him to get naked on a webcam with her; although others were happy with the celebrity cast.
