= School Attack 2018 =

South Korean television program

- Genre: Variety; Reality
- Presented by: Eun Ji-won; Son Dong-woon; Yerin
- Country of origin: South Korea
- Original language: Korean
- No. of seasons: 2
- No. of episodes: 12

Production
- Production location: South Korea
- Production company: SBS

Original release
- Network: SBS funE; SBS MTV; SBS Plus
- Release: June 25 – November 12, 2018

School Attack 2018 (Korean: 스쿨어택 2018) is a South Korean television program that airs on SBS funE, with replays on SBS MTV and SBS Plus. This is a reboot of the popular Korean variety show School Attack, that was aired from July 2003 to January 2009.

Season 1 aired from June 25, 2018 to August 20, 2018 at every Monday 21:00 (KST). Season 2 will air from October 22, 2018 to November 12, 2018 on the same time slot, with GFriend's Yerin replacing Momoland's JooE as host.

A 2019 version of the show will be launching from mid-August.

== Cast ==
=== Current ===
- Eun Ji-won (Sechskies) (Season 1–2)
- Son Dong-woon (Highlight) (Season 1–2)
- Yerin (GFriend) (Season 2)

=== Former ===
- JooE (Momoland) (Season 1)

== Program ==
=== Season 1 ===
- Guerrilla Concert
- LAN Cable Ripping Confession: Applicants invite someone he/she wants to relay their minds. After the invited listens to the applicant's confession, he/she can choose to either:
1. Open the barrier and enter the chatting window, then start to converse with the applicant, OR
2. Log out and not proceeding to converse

If the invited chose to converse with the applicant, they have to solve their problems through the conversation, and the invited then can choose to either accept or reject the applicant's request.

- Classroom Attack: Each class is represented by their class representatives, and they will answer various questions regarding the 10s culture. The winning class will represent the school to challenge the Scholarship Mission.
- Hope Dream Relay: The representing class has to finish a relay of 4 missions. If they can finish within 100 seconds, they will receive a scholarship of 5 million won.

=== Season 2 ===
- Self Life Memo Book: The guests will fill in their own profiles, and answer hypothetical questions.
- Going To School Mission - Find the Hidden XXX!: The guests will have to split into groups to find hidden items in the Attack School. If they are caught by the students during the process, the guests will have to be punished.
- Guerrilla Concert

== Episodes ==
=== Season 1 (Semester 1) ===
Episode #	Broadcast Date	Attack Star	Fan Name	Attack Zone	Attack School	Note(s)
1 2	June 25, 2018 July 9, 2018	NCT 127	NCTzen	Wansan District, Jeonju, North Jeolla Province	Jeonju University High School	Host JooE was absent due to other schedules
3 4	July 16, 2018 July 23, 2018	Monsta X	Monbebe	Dangha-dong, Seo District, Incheon	Incheon Taxation High School	—
5 6	July 30, 2018 August 6, 2018	NU'EST W	L.O.Λ.E	Dongtan-dong, Hwaseong, Gyeonggi Province	Bansong High School	Pristin V's Kyulkyung is absent
5 6	July 30, 2018 August 6, 2018	Pristin V (Note: Surprise Attack Star)	HIgh	Dongtan-dong, Hwaseong, Gyeonggi Province	Bansong High School	Pristin V's Kyulkyung is absent
7 8	August 13, 2018 August 20, 2018	Triple H	—	Gwangtan-myeon, Paju, Gyeonggi Province	Hanmin High School	—
7 8	August 13, 2018 August 20, 2018	Momoland	Merry-go-round	Gwangtan-myeon, Paju, Gyeonggi Province	Hanmin High School	—

=== Season 2 (Semester 2) ===
Episode #	Broadcast Date	Attack Star	Fan Name	Attack Zone	Attack School	Note(s)
9 10	October 22, 2018 October 29, 2018	iKON	iKONic	Deungchon-dong, Gangseo District, Seoul	Kyungbok Business High School	—
11 12	November 5, 2018 November 12, 2018	NCT Dream	NCTzen	Gusan-dong, Eunpyeong District, Seoul	Yale Girls' Junior High School	Hosts Eun Ji-won and Yerin were absent; Dongwoo (Infinite) stood in as special MC
