= All for You (EP) =

EP by Sechs Kies
- Released: January 28, 2020
- Recorded: 2018–2019
- Genre: K-pop
- Length: 19:33
- Language: Korean
- Label: YG
- Producer: Future Bounce

Sechs Kies chronology
Another Light (2017)	All for You (2020)

Singles from All for You
- 1. "All for You" Released: 28 January 2020

All for You is the first and only extended play by South Korean boy group Sechs Kies, released on January 28, 2020, by YG Entertainment. The EP marks their first release since Another Light (2017), and as a 4-member group following Kang Sunghoon's departure in January 2019.

== Background information ==
On September 21, 2018, YG Entertainment announced Sechskies was in the process of recording new music, with their target release date being pushed back as a result of scandals surrounding member Kang Sung-hoon. At a performance in October 14 of that year, Sechskies confirmed they would soon come back, and were in the midst of picking new songs for their upcoming album.

On November 14, 2019, it was confirmed that the comeback video was filmed and the group had yet to decide on a release date for the album. The album release date was eventually revealed on January 7, 2020. The album was title, All for You was announced on January 12, with the title track's details released two days later.

== Track listing ==
All for You track listing
No.	Title	Lyrics	Music	Arrangement	Length
1.	"All for You"	minGtion	Future Bounce, Andrew Choi	Future Bounce	4:02
2.	"Dream"	godok	Future Bounce, godok	Future Bounce	4:03
3.	"Meaningless"	Bigtone, Min Yeon-jae	Future Bounce, Bigtone	Future Bounce	3:41
4.	"Round and Round"	Bigtone, Min Yeon-jae	Future Bounce, Bigtone	Future Bounce	4:06
5.	"Walking in the Sky"	Bigtone, Min Yeon-jae, Future Bounce	Future Bounce, Bigtone	Future Bounce	3:41
Total length:					19:33

== Charts ==
Sales chart performance for All for You
Chart (2020)	Peak position
South Korean Albums (Gaon)	2

== See also ==
- List of 2020 albums
