= Jae-jin =

- Hangul: 재진
- RR: Jaejin
- MR: Chaejin

Jae-jin, also spelled Jai-jin, is a Korean given name.

People with this name include:

- Cho Jae-jin (born 1981), South Korean football player
- Lee Jae-jin (badminton) (born 1983), South Korean badminton player
- Lee Jai-jin (musician, born 1979), South Korean singer, member of boy band Sechs Kies
- Lee Jae-jin (musician, born 1991), South Korean musician and actor, member of rock band F.T. Island

== See also ==
- List of Korean given names
