= Road Fighter (album) =

Studio album by SechsKies
- Released: July 15, 1998
- Recorded: 1998
- Studios: Gwanghwamun Studio; Sinchon Music; Bay Studio
- Genres: K-pop; hip hop; dance-pop
- Length: 57:11
- Label: DSP Entertainment

SechsKies chronology
Welcome to the Sechskies Land (1997)	Road Fighter (1998)	Special (1998)

Singles from Road Fighter
- 1. "Road Fighter" Released: July 15, 1998; 2. "Reckless Love" Released: September 5, 1998

Road Fighter is the third studio album by South Korean boy band SechsKies. It was released on July 15, 1998, by DSP Entertainment. It is most notable for featuring the hit single "Reckless Love".

== Background ==
Following the success of their last album Welcome to the Sechskies Land with the promotional single, "Chivalry", which was the number-one song for five weeks on SBS' Inkigayo, the group went on a national tour around major cities in South Korea. In March 1998, their own movie, titled Seventeen, was filmed during the production of the Road Fighter album, which both would be released in July of that year just a few days apart.

For about a week and a half, Sechskies starred in a Korean version play called Alibaba and the 40 Thieves. This play ran from April 25 to May 5.

Sechskies appeared on Inkigayo on July 5, 1998, to promote the release of their next album, Road Fighter with the song "Crying Game". The group then performed with the songs "Road Fighter" in the months of July and August, then "Reckless Love" in the months of September and October after the album's release. Both of the songs received number-one song awards on music programs Inkigayo and Music Bank.

== Accolades ==
Awards and nominations
Year	Award	Category	Result	Ref.
1998	Golden Disc Awards	Album Daesang (Grand Prize)	Nominated	
1998	Golden Disc Awards	Album Bonsang (Main Prize)	Won	
1998	KMTV Music Awards	Popularity Award	Won	

Music program awards
Song	Program	Date
"Road Fighter"	Music Bank	July 28, 1998
"Road Fighter"	Music Bank	August 4, 1998
"Road Fighter"	Music Bank	August 18, 1998
"Road Fighter"	Inkigayo	August 23, 1998
"Road Fighter"	Inkigayo	August 30, 1998
"Reckless Love"	Music Bank	September 8, 1998
"Reckless Love"	Music Bank	September 15, 1998
"Reckless Love"	Music Bank	October 20, 1998
"Reckless Love"	Inkigayo	September 27, 1998
"Reckless Love"	Inkigayo	October 11, 1998

== Track listing ==
Credits.

No.	Title	Lyrics	Music	Translated Title	Length
1.	"Technopolis"	Kim Young-ah	Lee Yoon-sang, Bobby Kim		3:36
2.	"Road Fighter"	Kim Young-ah	Lee Yoon-sang		3:20
3.	"Reckless Love" (무모한 사랑; Mumohan Sarang)	Lee Seung-ho	Yoon Il-sang		3:46
4.	"Chance" (지금이야; Jigeumiya)	Kim Young-ah	Joo Young-hoon	This is the Moment	3:58
5.	"Fake G's" (절대자; Jeoldaeja)	Kim Young-ah	Lee Yoon-sang, Eun Jiwon	Absolutes	4:20
6.	"Crying Game"	Lee Seung-ho	Shin In-soo, Kim Seung-hyun		3:39
7.	"Flying Love" (천상비애 (天上飛愛); Cheonsang Bi-ae)	Kim Young-ah	Lee Yoon-sang	Love in Heaven	3:56
8.	"Armageddon" (약속된 운명 (아마게돈); Yaksokdoen Unmyeong (Amagedon))	Kim Young-ah	Kim Seok-chan, Lee Seung-hee		Promised Destiny
9.	"Come To Me Baby"	Kim Young-ah	Kim Seok-chan, Jun Joon-kyu		3:43
10.	"Persevere" (7전 8기; Chiljeon Palgi)	Kim Young-ah	Kim Seok-chan, Jun Joon-kyu	The title of the track is a wordplay of the word "persevere" using Korean numbers	3:27
11.	"Run Away"	Kim Young-ah	Lee, Eun		3:55
12.	"Fox Hunt" (여우사냥; Yeo-u Sanyang)	Kim Young-ah	Lee Yoon-sang		3:11
13.	"Say"	Jang Dae-sung	kim Seok-chan		4:21
14.	"Last"	Kim Young-ah	Shin In-soo, Kim Seung-hyun		4:26
15.	"Together Forever" (그날까지; Keu Nalkkaji)	Kim Young-joon (Nana School)		Until That Day	3:47
Total length:					57:11

== Credits and personnel ==
Sechs Kies

- Eun Ji-won – rap, vocals, chorus
- Lee Jae-jin – rap, vocals, chorus
- Kim Jae-deok – rap, chorus
- Kang Seong-hoon – main vocal, chorus
- Ko Ji-yong – rap, vocals, chorus
- Jang Su-won – vocals, chorus

Session

- Sam Lee, Geunhyeong Lee – guitar
- Shin Hyeong-kwon – bass guitar
- Cheon Seong-il – keyboard instrument
- Woojin Kim – voice processor
- Kim Chang-hwan, Yoon Il-sang, Kim Gun-mo, Cheon Seong-il, Hong Jong-gu, Han Sang-il, Hong Jong-ho, Park Mi-kyung, Kim Tae-young, etc. – chorus

Staff

- Changhwan Kim – producer, recording (Gwanghwamun Studio), mixing
- Cheon Seong-il – co-producer
- Baek Jin-ho (Gwanghwamun Studio) – mixing (11), recording
- An Jeong-seon (Gwanghwamun Studio) – recording
- Youngho Yang (Sinchon Music) – recording
  - Beomseok Hong (Sinchon Music) – assistant
- Jongjin Han (Bay Studio) – recording
- Sang-Hwan Seo/Hyun-Sook Lee (Sonic Korea) – mastering
- Youngsoon Jeong – art director, design
- Minho Jang – illustrator
- Wootaek Yoon – photography
- Kim Ki-young, Nam Taek-jun, Yoo Seong-sik – management
- Changhwan Kim – media line producer
