= G1 (album) =

Studio album by Eun Ji-won
- Released: June 27, 2019
- Genre: Hip hop
- Length: 30:46
- Label: YG

Eun Ji-won chronology
| Trauma (2015) | G1 (2019) |

Singles from G1
- 1. "I'm On Fire (불나방)" Released: June 27, 2019

G1 is the sixth studio album by South Korean rapper Eun Ji-won, released on June 27, 2019, through YG Entertainment. This marks Ji-won's first studio album in 10 years since "Platonic" as well as first release as a solo artist since single album "Trauma" in 2015. The album features the lead single "I'm On Fire" (불나방).

== Track listing ==
| No. | Title | Lyrics | Music | Arrangement | Length |
|---|---|---|---|---|---|
| 1. | "How We Do" | Eun Jiwon; Bigtone; Tyfoon | Eun Jiwon; Future Bounce; Bigtone | Future Bounce | 3:06 |
| 2. | "I'm On Fire" (불나방) (featuring Blue.D) | Mino; Eun Jiwon | Future Bounce; Mino | Future Bounce | 3:32 |
| 3. | "Sexy" | B.I; Eun Jiwon | Diggy; Kang Uk Jin; B.I | Diggy; Kang Uk Jin | 3:15 |
| 4. | "Worthless" (쓰레기) | B.I; Eun Jiwon | B.I; Millenium | Millennium | 3:28 |
| 5. | "Hooligan" (featuring Mino of Winner) | Eun Jiwon; Mino | Kang Uk Jin; Diggy; Mino | Kang Uk Jin; Diggy | 3:11 |
| 6. | "Get Ready" | Leon | Kang Uk Jin; Leon | Kang Uk Jin | 3:33 |
| 7. | "Tipsy" (비틀비틀) | Bigtone; Rovin | Rovin; Bigtone; 2Rise | Rovin; 2Rise | 3:14 |
| 8. | "Hate" | Leon | Future Bounce; Leon | Future Bounce | 3:58 |
| 9. | "Same" (비슷비슷해) | Leon | Kang Uk Jin; Diggy; Leon | Kang Uk Jin; Diggy | 3:23 |

== Charts ==
| Chart (2019) | Peak position |
|---|---|
| South Korean Albums (Gaon) | 2 |

== Release history ==
| Country | Date | Format | Label | Ref. |
|---|---|---|---|---|
| Various | June 27, 2019 | Digital download; streaming | YG Entertainment | |
| South Korea | July 1, 2019 | CD | YG Entertainment | |
