= Another Light =

Studio album by Sechs Kies
- Released: September 21, 2017
- Recorded: 2017
- Genres: K-pop, dance-pop, acoustic, hip hop
- Length: 31:00
- Language: Korean
- Label: YG Entertainment

Sechs Kies chronology
The 20th Anniversary (2017)	Another Light (2017)	All for You (2020)

Singles from Another Light
- 1. "Something Special" Released: September 21, 2017; 2. "Smile" Released: September 21, 2017

Another Light is the fifth and final studio album of South Korean group Sechs Kies. The album was released on September 21, 2017, by the group's record label, YG Entertainment. It was the last album to feature member Sunghoon before his departure on January 1, 2019, from Sechskies and YG.

== Background ==
In 2000 Sechs Kies disbanded abruptly, announcing that they wanted to leave when their popularity was at its peak and pursue an ordinary life, three years after they debuted under the management of DSP Entertainment.

After signing with YG Entertainment in 2016, Sechs Kies released three new singles and re-released their old hit songs. Another Light is the band's first studio album in 18 years, following Blue Note, released in May 2000. It contains nine new tracks, including the double lead single "Something Special" and "Smile".

== Release and promotion ==
The album was made available for pre-orders on September 18. The album was made available on major streaming platforms on September 21, while the physical release occurred on September 22. The album has two different versions, Type A and Type B, with a 64-page photo book and random photo card, while limited quantities produced in initial production included a poster.

Sechs Kies held a live broadcast via Naver V Live, 1 hour prior to their new album release. The group were also guests on JTBC’s Knowing Bros to promote the album. Sechs Kies performed "Something Special" for the first time on SBS's Inkigayo on September 24. The group held a series of fan signing events in South Korea to promote the album. They held their 20th anniversary concert on September 23 at the Seoul Gocheok Sky Dome.

== Commercial performance ==
Another Light entered the Billboard World Albums chart at number 10, and was successful domestically as well, ranking at number 10 on the Gaon October album chart. The title song "Something Special" (특별해) held the number 1 spot on the Gaon BGM Chart for six consecutive weeks, and achieved a double crown on Gaon for the month of October, ranking number 1 on both the digital and BGM charts, as well as reaching number 2 on the Gaon monthly download chart.

== Track listing ==
No.	Title	Lyrics	Music	Arrangement	Length
1.	"Something Special" (특별해)	Liøn, Kang Uk-jin	Kang Uk-jin, Diggy, Liøn	Kang Uk-jin, Diggy	3:19
2.	"Feeling" (느낌이 와)	Liøn, Kang Uk-jin	Kang Uk-jin, Diggy, Liøn	Kang Uk-jin, Diggy	3:32
3.	"Smile" (웃어줘)	Liøn	Diggy, Liøn, Kang Uk-jin	Diggy, Kang Uk-jin	3:48
4.	"Need U" (네가 필요해)	iHwak	Rovin, iHwak	Rovin	3:42
5.	"Backhug" (백하그)	Min Yeon-jae, BIGTONE, Eun Ji-won, MINO, HOONY	Q, BIGTONE, iHwak	Q	3:20
6.	"Drinking Problem" (술끊자)	Tablo	Future Bounce, Tablo	Future Bounce	3:19
7.	"Vertigo" (현기증)	Min Yeon-jae, Liøn	Kang Uk-jin, Liøn	Kang Uk-jin	3:34
8.	"Never Again" (다신)	iHwak	iHwak, Primeboi	Primeboi	3:12
9.	"It's Been a While" (오랜만이에요)	Kang Uk-jin, Liøn	Kang Uk-jin, Liøn	Kang Uk-jin	3:52

== Charts ==
Chart (2018)	Peak position
South Korean Albums (Gaon)	2
US World Albums (Billboard)	10

== Release history ==
Country	Date	Label(s)	Format	Ref.
Various	September 21	YG Entertainment, Genie Music	Digital download	
South Korea	September 22	YG Entertainment, Genie Music	CD	
