= The 20th Anniversary =

Compilation album by Sechskies
- Released: April 28, 2017
- Genre: K-pop, dance-pop, hip-hop, contemporary R&B
- Language: Korean
- Label: YG Entertainment; KT Music

Sechskies chronology
2016 Re-ALBUM (2016)	The 20th Anniversary (2017)	Another Light (2017)

Singles from The 20th Anniversary
- 1. "Three Words" Released: October 6, 2016; 2. "Be Well / Sad Song" Released: April 28, 2017

The 20th Anniversary is a compilation album by South Korean boy band Sechs Kies, released on April 28, 2017. YG Entertainment announced the development of a new Sechs Kies album along with proper music videos for two title tracks, "Be Well (아프지마요)" and "Sad Song (슬픈노래)", both written and produced by labelmate Tablo.

== Background ==
Following the success of the group's domestic concert tour, "Yellow Note", YG Entertainment announced plans for the development of a new Sechs Kies album to celebrate the group's 20th anniversary (April 15, 2017). The album was revealed to include two new songs, with their music videos, and be released on April 28, 2017. The group also announced the opening of an exhibition related to the group's comeback, called "Yellow Universe", which is open for a month after the album is released.

On April 26, YG Entertainment revealed the track list of the album to the public, which listed all eleven of the songs for the album. The two title tracks, "Be Well" (아프지마요) and "Sad Song" (슬픈노래), along with pre-released single, "Three Words (세 단어)", and eight other classic hits by the group that were remastered and rearranged for their concert tour.

Be Well music program wins
Program	Date
KBS's Music Bank	May 12, 2017
MBC's Show! Music Core	May 13, 2017
MBC's Show! Music Core	May 20, 2017

== Track listing ==
- Tracks 4–11 are classic hits that were remastered and rerecorded for this album

#	Title	Lyrics	Composition	Arranger	Original album	Duration
1.	"Be Well" _{(아프지마요)}	Tablo	Tablo, Future Bounce	Future Bounce	The 20th Anniversary	4:12
2.	"Sad Song" _{(슬픈노래)}	Tablo	Tablo, Future Bounce	Future Bounce	The 20th Anniversary	3:28
3.	"Three Words" _{(세 단어)}	Tablo	Tablo, Future Bounce	Future Bounce	2016 Re-ALBUM	4:03
4.	"Heartbreak" _{(연정)}	Lee Seung-ho	Yoon Il-sang	Robin	School Byeolgok	3:19
5.	"Reckless Love" _{(무모한 사랑)}	Lee Seung-ho	Yoon Il-sang	Airplay	Road Fighter	3:47
6.	"Say"	Jang Dae-sung	Kim Seok-chan	Airplay	Road Fighter	3:08
7.	"Let U Go" _{(너를 보내며)}	Jang Dae-sung	Kim Seok-chan	Robin	Special	3:55
8.	"Come to Me Baby"	Kim Young-a	Kim Seok-chan	Robin	Road Fighter	3:22
9.	"Bad Girl" _{(배신감)}	Lee Seung-ho	Yoon Il-sang	Robin	School Byeolgok	3:42
10.	"Dear Love" _{(사라하는 너에게)}	Jang Dae-sung	Ma Gyung-shik	Robin	Welcome to the Sechskies Land	3:57
11.	"Together Forever" _{(그날까지)}	Nana School	Nana School	Robin	Road Fighter	4:17
Total playtime:						41:09
