= Ko Ji-yong =

South Korean singer

- Born: July 1, 1980 (age 46); Seoul, South Korea
- Spouse: Heo Yang-im (m. 2013; div. 2024)
- Children: 1
- Musical career
- Genre: K-pop
- Occupation: Singer
- Years active: 1997–2000, 2016, 2026–present
- Label: DSP Media
- Member of: Sechs Kies

Korean name
- Hangul: 고지용
- Hanja: 高志溶
- RR: Go Jiyong
- MR: Ko Chiyong

Ko Ji-yong (born July 1, 1980) is a South Korean singer and businessman. He was a member of Sechs Kies, a first generation K-pop idol dance group which disbanded in 2000 but reunited in 2016. Unlike most of the other members, Ko left the entertainment industry and started his own company. He made his first television appearance in years when he appeared at Sechs Kies' reunion special on Infinite Challenge. Due to his family and work commitments he did not sign a contract with the group's new label YG Entertainment or promote with them as a performer but was considered to be part of the group until 2018. From January 2017 to May 2019, he and his son appeared on the reality show The Return of Superman.

== Early life ==
A native of Seoul, Ko was elementary schoolmates with future Sechs Kies bandmate Kang Sung-hun and g.o.d member Son Ho-young. He lost contact with Kang after the latter went to the United States to attend high school.

== Career ==
=== Sechs Kies and retirement ===
Ko was recruited by Kang to join the boy band he and his high school friend Eun Ji-won were forming. The group was eventually named Sechs Kies and debuted on April 15, 1997. Ko was the second youngest member.

Until the time the group disbanded in 2000, he was greatly loved by fans for his handsome looks and singing voice. Unlike other members, he did not continue his career as a solo singer but he was cast as a host in an internet broadcast and as an actor in a television drama. However, Ko chose to leave the entertainment industry to start his own business.

In 2008, fellow Sechs Kies member and leader Eun Ji-won appeared in the entertainment program Come to Play and remarked that he had not seen Ko since the group's disbandment. Fellow vocalist Jang Su-won revealed on Happy Together in 2014 that he was in contact with Ko and confirmed that he was running his own business.

=== Reunion ===
In 2016, Sechs Kies reunited after their disbandment in 2000 through the variety show Infinite Challenge. Ko, who had left the entertainment business permanently after the disbandment to pursue a new career, surprised the members of SechsKies as well as all the fans by appearing at the reunion concert and performing their hit song "Couple". After Infinite Challenge aired, Sechs Kies earned many more fans; their hit songs ranked high in music charts and “Couple” was seen in 11th place in Music Bank. The group officially reunited and signed a group contract with YG Entertainment in May that year. However, Ko was the only one who did not sign, having been the only member to depart from the entertainment industry completely.

On July 18, Ko publicly appeared as a sponsor for a charity basketball event and held interviews with the media for the first time in 16 years. He stated that he is now living as a "half-celebrity" since appearing on Infinite Challenge. On November 30, it was announced that Ko and his son would be joining the cast of The Return of Superman. He said although he cannot participate in current Sechs Kies group activities as a family man, he has determined to keep his promise to "create opportunities to be with fans through activities he can participate." Also as he was unable to spend more time with his son, he hopes to make many memories with him through the program. In May 2019, Ko announced that he and his son would be leaving the cast of The Return of Superman.

=== Return to Sechskies ===
On October 29, 2026, it was announced that Ko Ji Yong would be rejoining Secshkies at a special stage in December 2026.

== Personal life ==
On December 13, 2013, Ko married Heo Yang-im, a professor of family medicine and a doctor. The couple have a son, Ko Seung-jae, born on October 6, 2014. In July 2026, he revealed on his social media that he had divorced Heo two years earlier.

In 2025, it was revealed that Ko started a restaurant after the rumored collapse of his real estate business.

== Discography ==
=== Studio albums ===
- School Byeolgok (학원별곡) (1997)
- Welcome To The Sechskies Land (1997)
- Road Fighter (1998)
- Special Album (1998)
- Com’Back (1999)

=== Other albums ===
- Ali Baba and the 40 Thieves Musical OST (1998)
- 1020 Mix (1999)
- Sechskies Live Concert (1999)
- Blue Note (2000)

== Music credits ==
Artist(s)	Song Information
Sechs Kies	"Foe (적(敵)" - Com` Back

== Filmography ==
=== Film ===
Year	Title	Role
1998	Seventeen: The Movie	

=== Variety show ===
Year	Title	Network	Role	Notes/Ref.
2017–2019	The Return of Superman	KBS2	Cast member	Ep. 154–280

== Awards ==
Year	Awards
1997	12th Korea Visual and Records Grand Prize Award (Golden Disc Awards), Bonsang; Seoul Music Awards, Bonsang; KMTV Korean Music Awards, New Artist; KBS Music Awards, Bonsang; MBC Music Festival, Best 10 Artist Award; SBS Music Awards, Best 10 Artist Award
1998	13th Korea Visual and Records Grand Prize Award (Golden Disc Awards), Bonsang; 9th Seoul Music Awards, Daesang (Shared With H.O.T.); 9th Seoul Music Awards, Bonsang; KMTV Korean Music Awards, Popularity Award; KBS Music Awards, Artist Of The Year (Teen Category); MBC Music Festival, Popularity Award (Voted By Under 30); SBS Music Awards, Best 10 Artist Award
1999	14th Korea Visual and Records Grand Prize Award (Golden Disc Awards), Bonsang; 10th Seoul Music Awards, Bonsang; KMTV Korean Music Awards, Bonsang; KBS Music Awards, Bonsang; MBC Music Festival, Best 10 Artist Award; SBS Music Awards, Best 10 Artist Award
2018	16th KBS Entertainment Awards, Excellence Award – Male Variety Category
