= Lee Jai-jin (musician, born 1979) =

South Korean singer and dancer (born 1979)

- 이재진
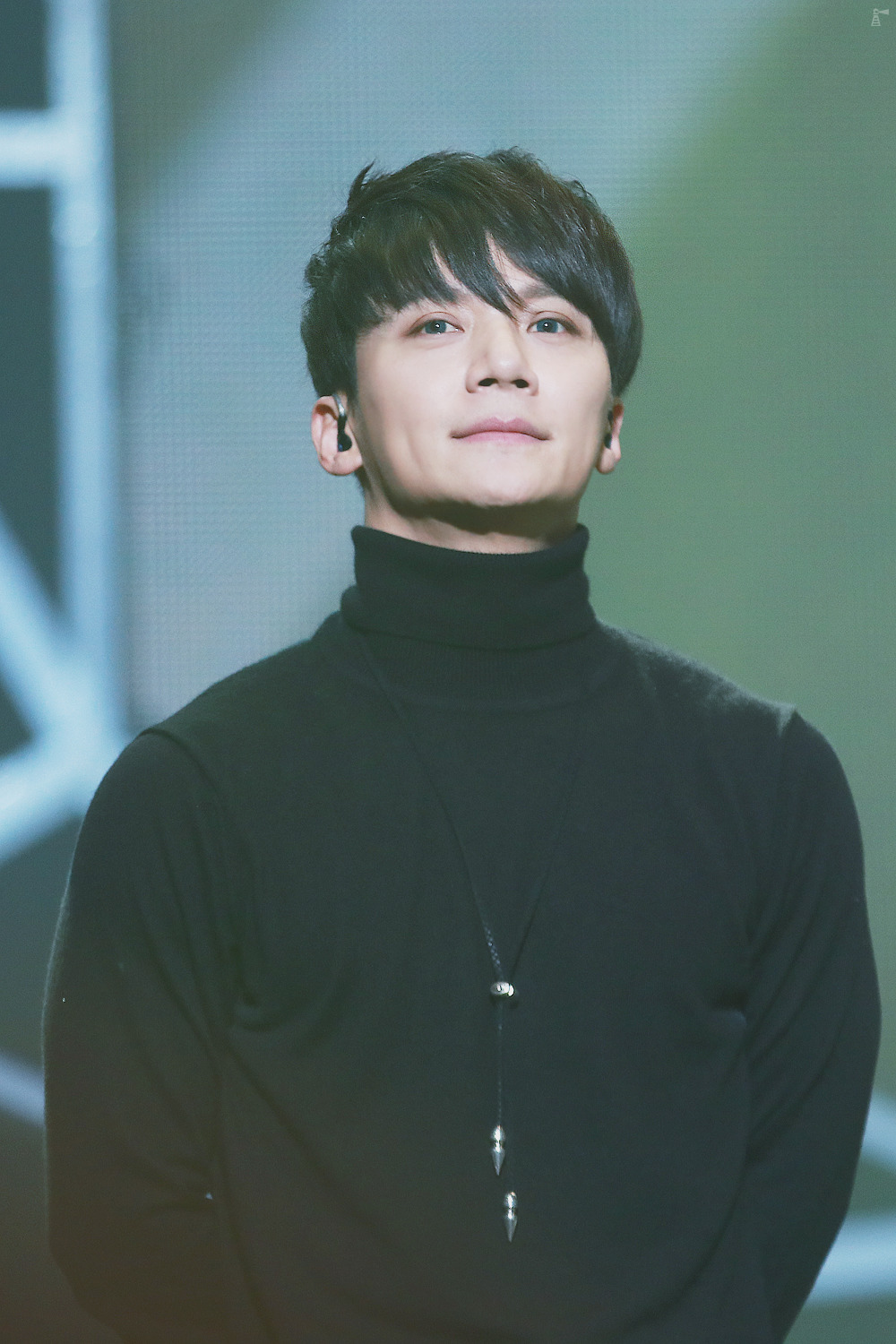
- Lee in January 2017
- Born: July 13, 1979 (age 47); Busan, South Korea
- Occupations: Singer; dancer
- Years active: 1997–present
- Spouse: Unknown (m. 2021)
- Musical career
- Genres: K-pop; hip hop; R&B
- Instrument: Vocals
- Labels: Daesung; YG Entertainment
- Member of: Sechs Kies

Korean name
- Hangul: 이재진
- Hanja: 李宰鎮
- RR: I Jaejin
- MR: I Chaejin

Lee Jai-jin (Korean: 이재진; born July 13, 1979) is a South Korean singer and dancer. Lee is the sub-rapper and main-dancer of the South Korean boy group Sechs Kies.

== Career ==
=== 1997–2000: Sechs Kies ===
Lee and Kim Jae-duck formed a dance crew called "Quicksilver’" in their hometown of Busan, and was selected as a trainee in Lee Juno's company. Lee Juno was famous as Seo Taiji and Boys' member. At that time Lee Ho-yeon, Daesung Entertainment's CEO, asked him to recommend a idol group member. That is how he became a Sechs Kies' member. In 2016, Kang Sung-hoon said that he had watched the audition tape and chosen Lee as a member for his superior dancing skill and good looks.

Lee debuted as a member of Sechs Kies, signed under Daesung Entertainment, in 1997. Along with Kim Jae-duck, he created the choreography for most of Sechs Kies' music videos. Sechs Kies achieved great success and became an icon of the 1990s Korean idol groups. However, Sechs Kies suddenly disbanded in 2000 after finishing their fourth album's promotion.

=== 2000–2016: Solo career and other endeavors ===
After Sechs Kies' disbandment, Lee was the third member from the group to begin a solo career. He released his first album, entitled S.Wing with a hit song "Double J" in 2001. He released the following album, 002 J2 with a title song "Go Back" in 2003. However, it failed to see a great success compared to when he was performing as Sechs Kies. After three years of hiatus, he subsequently released his third album, entitled It's New with the hit song "Charge" in 2005. Lee began his mandatory military service in 2006.

After being released from the military, Lee withdrew from the entertainment industry and went to study in Japan. In 2011, Lee participated in Big Bang's Special Edition album, drawing illustrations for the five members. In 2013, Lee co-operated with his brother-in-law to open a new restaurant, School Food, in a YG Entertainment-owned building. In 2015 and 2016, he participated in group exhibitions, 상상연대 2 (Imagination Alliance 2) and 상상연대 3 (Imagination Alliance 3), in GALERIE GAIA under his pseudonym 한조 (Hanzo).

=== 2016: Sechs Kies reunion ===
In 2016, Lee and his former Sechs Kies bandmates, except Ko Ji-yong, reunited on Infinite Challenge. All members, except Ko, signed a contract with YG Entertainment as a band, while Lee and Kang Sung-hoon also signed as solo artists.

On August 19, Lee joined SBS's variety show Flower Crew with Eun Ji-won, however, withdrew from the show to focus on group promotions.

== Personal life ==
=== Family ===
Lee's father died in 2006, due to pancreatic cancer, and his mother died in 2008.

In May 2021, Lee's agency announced that Lee would be marrying his non-celebrity girlfriend. The wedding will not be held due to the coronavirus situation and will be held as a private event instead of eating with the family.

Lee's sister, former SWI.T member Lee Eun-ju, is married to Yang Hyun-suk, founder of YG Entertainment. The couple married in March 2010, and their daughter was born in August the same year.

=== Military service ===
In 2006, he worked in a game development company as a skilled industry personnel to fulfill his mandatory military service. This was later cancelled by the Military Manpower Administration, on the grounds of working in web design rather than designated fields, such as information processing or game software development. He went to court to appeal this decision but lost the case. As a result, Lee entered the military again on August 25, 2008. While serving, he was treated for psychiatric issues because of his parents' death. He was granted four days' leave on March 2, 2009; however, he later failed to report back, and cut off all contact with family and friends. On April 8, 2009, he was found by military police investigators in a Daegu motel, located in his parents' hometown. He was sentenced to two years of probation that following June. After the trial, Lee was sent back to his unit and had to serve extra days to remedy for the period he went missing. On August 10, 2010, Lee was discharged.

== Discography ==
=== Albums ===
Album #	Album information	List
1st	First Album《S.Wing》: Issue date: 2001/11/19; language: Korean language	List: 1. Double J 2. You & Me; 3. 사랑이란 이름으로; 4. As Love...; 5. Fever; 6. Ready; 7. 비연; 8. Rather; 9. Emergency Escape; 10. 함께; 11. 어머니; 12. So I Want You Tonight
2nd	Second Album《002 J2》: Issue date: 2003/4/8; language: Korean language	List: 1. ♡ (Love); 2. 배달의 기수; 3. Egoist; 4. 멀어진대도...; 5. 5월(애); 6. Profile; 7. 고백(Go Back); 8. I Know; 9. 이렇게라도....; 10. Love Step; 11. My Love; 12. 우리
3rd	Third Album《It's New!》: Issue date: 2005/3/30; language: Korean language	List: 1. 충전; 2. Stand up!; 3. I Wish; 4. 한번쯤 말하면; 5. 샤랄랄라; 6. Automatic; 7. Get up my love 8. Boogie trip 9. Sweep; 10. 사랑하고 싶은데; 11. Undo; 12. 한번쯤 말하면(JJ Ver)

=== VCD ===
VCD #	VCD information	List
1st	1st..Concert (실황라이브 콘서트) -VCD: Issue date: 2002/10; language: Korean language	VCD1 List: 1. Opening; 2. Double J 3. Ready + 인사말; 4. eun ji won video message 5. Mur Mur + Ment; 6. Rather; 7. 사랑이란 이름으로 + Ment; 8. 어머니; 9. 비연; 10. Ment (with Kang Sung Hoon); 11. Interview; VCD2 List: 1. Fever; 2. Emergency Escape; 3. Ment (with 유빈); 4. As Love...; 5. 함께; 6. You & Me; 7. Double J + Ment; 8. Again; 9. Fever + Ment; 10. Couple + Ment; 11. 기억해줄래

=== Others ===
- Lotus world (연꽃세상) with 이화수 (2002)
- Again (Metal Slug 4 Main Theme) (2002)

== Music credits ==
Artist(s)	Song Information
SECHSKIES	"Rigoletto (여자의 마음)" - Com` Back
Lee Jai-jin	"In The Name Of Love (사랑이란 이름으로)" - S.Wing; "Love Step" - 002 J2; "Profile" - 002 J2
The Glam	"6" - The Glam; "Made In U.S.A." - The Glam; "Wild Flower" - The Glam; "Rose" - The Glam
Airbag	"Poetree (열대야)" - Contact Us
Lee Jai-jin^{1}	"Please (부디)" - Spy Girl OST (그녀를 모르면 간첩 OST); "Reunion (재회)" - Spy Girl OST (그녀를 모르면 간첩 OST); "Prologue" - Spy Girl OST (그녀를 모르면 간첩 OST); "Happy Birthday (생일 축하합니다)" - Spy Girl OST (그녀를 모르면 간첩 OST); "신얼짱 계순" - Spy Girl OST (그녀를 모르면 간첩 OST); "골목길" - Spy Girl OST (그녀를 모르면 간첩 OST); "진아의 등장" - Spy Girl OST (그녀를 모르면 간첩 OST); "Love Theme" - Spy Girl OST (그녀를 모르면 간첩 OST); "Taking Pictures (사진 찍기)" - Spy Girl OST (그녀를 모르면 간첩 OST); "Spy Girl (여간첩 계순)" - Spy Girl OST (그녀를 모르면 간첩 OST); "Hidden Story (숨겨온 이야기)" - Spy Girl OST (그녀를 모르면 간첩 OST); "Girlfriend (여자친구)" - Spy Girl OST (그녀를 모르면 간첩 OST)

^{1}Another artist with the same name.

== Filmography ==
=== Film ===
Year	Title	Role
1998	Seventeen: The Movie	
2018	SechsKies 18	

=== Variety show ===
Year	Title	Notes
2018	YG Future Strategy Office	Cast member

== See also ==
- Sechs Kies
- K-pop
- Korean music
- DSP Media
