= Three Words (song) =

Single by Sechs Kies

from the album The 20th Anniversary
- Released: October 7, 2016
- Recorded: 2016
- Length: 4:03
- Label: YG Entertainment
- Songwriter: Tablo
- Producer: Future Bounce

Sechs Kies singles chronology
"Thanks" (2000)	"Three Words" (2016)	"Be Well / Sad Song" (2017)

"Three Words" is song recorded by South Korean boy band Sechs Kies, released on October 7, 2016, as a digital single by YG Entertainment and later included on their 2017 compilation album, The 20th Anniversary. It was written by Tablo while the production was done by Future Bounce. Musically, it is a mid-tempo ballad.

"Three Words" was the first single released by Sechs Kies after their disbandment in 2000, as well as the first single recorded without member Ko Ji-yong. It was commercially successful in South Korea where it peaked at number one on the Gaon Digital Chart.

== Charts ==
Chart (2016)	Peak position
South Korea (Gaon Weekly Digital Chart)	1
South Korea (Gaon Monthly Digital Chart)	1
South Korea (Gaon Weekly Download Chart)	1
