= Three Little Words =

"Three Little Words" may refer to:

- "Three Little Words" (song), a 1930 song by Bert Kalmar and Harry Ruby
- Three Little Words (film), a 1950 film about Kalmar and Ruby
- "Three Little Words" (Miranda), a 2013 television episode
- Three Little Words (TV series), a British TV game show of the 1970s
- "Three Little Words", a 1996 song by Billy Ray Cyrus
- "Three Little Words", a 2000 song by Da Vinci's Notebook
- Three Little Words, a 2021 album by Dominique Fils-Aimé
