= School Anthem =

School Anthem (학원별곡)

Studio album by Sechs Kies
- Released: May 14, 1997
- Recorded: 1997
- Genre: K-pop; hip hop; dance-pop; R&B
- Length: 46:46
- Label: DaeSung Enterprise

Sechs Kies chronology
School Anthem (학원별곡) (1997)	Welcome to the Sechs Kies Land (1997)

Singles from School Anthem
- 1. "School Anthem" Released: May 14, 1997; 2. "A Man's Path (Live or Die by Style)" Released: May 14, 1997; 3. "Remember Me" Released: May 14, 1997; 4. "Heartbreak" Released: May 14, 1997

School Anthem (Korean: 학원별곡; RR: Hagwonbyeolgok; or "School Byeolgok") is the debut studio album by South Korean boy band Sechs Kies. It was released on May 14, 1997, by DSP Entertainment. The album features the hit song, "A Man's Path (Live or Die by Style)" (Hangul: 사나이 가는길 (폼생폼사).

== Background ==
On April 15, 1997, Sechs Kies debuted with their first single "School Anthem". Sechs Kies immediately gained attention for being a great promotional competitor to H.O.T as the hottest rookie group of the year. A month later, on May 14, 1997, they released a full-length album named after the title track, "School Anthem". They also promoted the album with the songs "A Man's Path (Live or Die by Style)", "Remember Me", and "Heartbreak".

The album reportedly sold 600,000 copies, but a former manager of the group says the album may have exceeded around 1.7-1.8 million copies. Since there were no official records for album sales before September 1998, this could mean that this total comes from the sales made in that year, which would also include the sales of their next album, Welcome to the Sechskies Land, released in November that same year.

== Reception ==
The title track, "School Anthem" called out the problematic education system that obsessed over grades with its lyrics. Paired together with a strong rap beat, the song appealed to teenagers the month. Their acrobatic dance moves and their signature "back down" dance move, showcased how capable this group was and ranked them within Gayo Top 10's (Hangul: 가요톱10) top 20 list.

The track "School Anthem" was covered by a 3rd generation boy band, BTS in a mashup that included H.O.T's "Warrior's Descendant" and their own debut track, "No More Dream" for an end-of-the-year performance at the 2013 MBC Gayo Daejejeon.

The song, "A Man's Path (Live or Die by Style)" has been covered by several boy groups, such as SS501, (who were part of DSP Media at the time), U-Kiss, VIXX, as well as by the rookie group SF9.

== Music videos ==
Daesung Entertainment released music videos for two of the songs on the album. One of the music videos is for the title track School Anthem, which contains various clips of students in school, self camera shots of the members singing and rapping, and the entire group dancing.

The second song is for A Man's Path (Live or Die by Style). The song used in the music video is the remix version, and contains various clips of the group dancing and having fun. There are two versions of the music video for this track.

== Track listing ==
Bolded tracks are noted as the promotional tracks of the album.

No.	Title	Lyrics	Music	Translated Title	Length
1.	"Rise Up / **School Anthem**" (학원별곡; "Hakwon Byeolgok")	Park Gi-young	Lee Yoon-sang	School Byeolgok	4:04
2.	"**Heartbreak**" (연정 (戀情); "Yeon Jung")	Lee Seung-ho	Yoo Il-sang	Affection	3:34
3.	"**The Boy Is On The Way** (Live or Die by Style)" (사나이 가는 길 (폼生폼死); "Sanai Ganeun Gil (Pom Saeng Pom Sa)")	Kim Young-ah	Park Geun-tae		4:01
4.	"Confirming" (확인; "Hwakin")	Kim Eun-jung	Park Geun-tae		3:59
5.	"Bad Girl" (배신감; "Baeshingam")	Lee Seung-ho	Yoon Il-sang	Betrayal	3:43
6.	"**Remember Me**" (기억해줄래; "Gieokhaejullae")	Jang Dae-sung	Park Geun-tae	Will You Remember Me?	4:07
7.	"Walking in the Rain"	Park Gi-young	Lee Yoon-sang		4:57
8.	"Dream Comes True"	Lee Seung-ho	Lee Yoon-sang		3:45
9.	"Love Announcement" (사랑 신고식; "Sarang Shin-goshik")	Kang Eun-kyung	Lee Yoon-sang		3:33
10.	"Come On!" (다 같이 해요)	Kang Eun-kyung	Lee Yoon-sang	Let's Do It All Together	3:32
11.	"Heartbreak (Remix)"				3:43
12.	"The Boy Is On The Way (Remix)"				3:47
Total length:					46:46
