= Eun Ji-won =

South Korean rapper

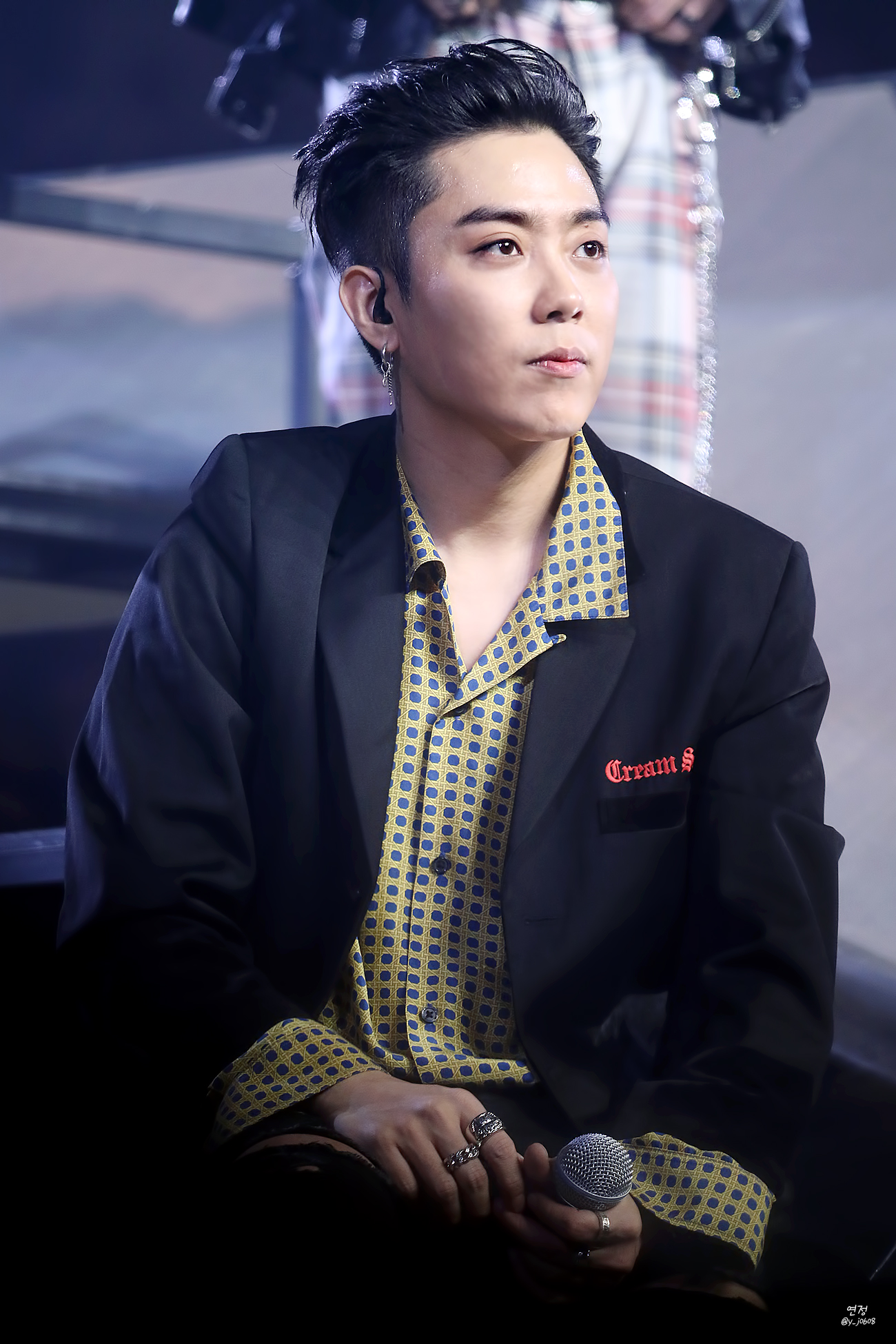
- Eun in 2017
- Born: June 8, 1978 (age 48); Seoul, South Korea
- Occupations: Rapper; singer; actor; entertainer
- Years active: 1997–present
- Spouses: Lee Soo-yeon (m. 2010; div. 2012); Unknown (m. 2025)
- Musical career
- Genres: K-pop; hip hop
- Instrument: Vocals
- Labels: Daesung; GYM; YG
- Member of: Sechs Kies
- Formerly of: Movement, Clover, HOTSechgodRG

Korean name
- Hangul: 은지원
- Hanja: 殷志源
- RR: Eun Jiwon
- MR: Ŭn Chiwŏn

Eun Ji-won (Korean: 은지원; born June 8, 1978) is a South Korean rapper, singer, actor and entertainer. He is the leader of the first generation idol group Sechs Kies (젝스키스).

He is recognized as an ancestor of the K-pop world, paving the way for hip-hop in the Korean pop scene. He is also considered an entertainment icon, popularly known as "Eun Choding" (Elementary Eun) for his childish on-screen persona on 1 Night 2 Days. In addition to his music, he continues to appear in shows like New Journey to the West.

== Early life ==
Eun Jiwon was born in Seoul, South Korea on June 8, 1978. His mother, Kim Seong Ah, was a singer from the female duo, the "Lily Sisters".

Eun studied abroad in Hawaii, attending the Hawaiian Mission Academy, from Grade 9 to 12. He was schoolmates with former Sechs Kies member, Kang Sung-hun. As a teen in Hawaii, he worked part time as a cafe DJ, where he picked up an interest in music and was recruited under DSP Media.

He is related to Park Chung Hee (grand uncle) and Park Geun-hye (first cousin, once removed), who both served as the President of South Korea.

== Career ==
=== 1997–2000: Sechs Kies ===
Eun Jiwon debuted under Sechs Kies on April 15, 1997 with their first single, "School Anthem" on the program KMTV Show! Music Tank. The team was met with positive reception and rose to fame with their hit songs PomSaengPomSa and Couple. Eun described his time with Sechs Kies as hectic due to back-to-back schedules paired with little rest.

In 1998, Eun made his on-screen debut, playing the lead role in the film Seventeen, which also featured fellow Sechs Kies members.

On May 18, 2000 Sechs Kies announced their disbandment. Despite their success, the group collectively to disband with hopes to succeed in the future. Following the disbandment, the group released a final track online, titled "Thanks".

=== Solo career ===
==== 2000–2004: Solo debut and breakthrough ====
Eun began his solo career on October 27, 2000 with the self composed mini album G. He continued to release dance music with the album G Pop, which was released on March 29, 2001. After the success of his first full album, Eun began to refine his style with his second album, Heavy G, his first full hip-hop album.

Under Waltz Music Entertainment he released his third album, Drunk in Hip Hop (including title track "Drunk in Melody") in September 6, 2003. The album was Eun's breakthrough into the hip-hop scene, solidifying his status as a rap artist and shedding his idol image. "Drunk in Melody" won Eun the Hip Hop Award at the 2003 SBS Gayo Awards and the KMTV Korean Music Awards.

Eun repackaged his third album, including an alternate version of "Mi Casa Ro" and "Never, Ever" from his first solo album.

==== 2004–2006: Acting and Hip-Hop ====
Eun starred in the romantic comedy Marrying a High-School Girl (여고생 시집가기), which was released on December 23, 2004. The film was met with poor reviews and was criticized for its absurd plotline. Eun recounted that he was forced into the role, noting how he shaved his head in an act of rebellion against doing the film.

Eun was a member of The Movement Crew (무브먼트), a hip-hop crew founded by Tiger JK, and performed at the group concert on May 13, 2006. Eun credits Tiger JK as a major influence in his musical style. His songs often feature fellow members including Drunken Tiger, Tasha (Yoon Mi Rae), Dynamic Duo and Bobby Kim.

==== 2007–2010: Variety Television and GYM Entertainment ====
Eun returned with a single, "Adios," marking the beginning to his connection to Latin inspired music. His album Love, Death, Introspection (사랑 死랑 思랑) was released on October 30, 2007 with four new tracks and an instrumental version of "Adios". At this time, Eun joined the 13 Creative Unit, a subsidiary of Eyagi Entertainment.

After appearing steadily in small entertainment television roles, Eun joined the KBS reality-variety show1 Night 2 Days as a founding member. The show was met with nation-wide recognition and Eun became a staple household name. He was praised for his comedic personality as "Eun Choding" and continued to explore his career as a variety entertainer.

Eun was a host on the SBS live music program Inkigayo from May 11, 2008 to July 19, 2009.

In early 2009, Eun left CH Entertainment and founded his own company, GYM Entertainment.

Eun released his fifth full-length studio album, Platonic, an electronic dance album. The title track, "Siren", was a homage to his fans as his "last" dance song ever. However, he would continue to release the single While Buzzed, another electronic dance song.

==== 2011–2013: Clover and HotSechGodRG ====
On March 31, 2011, Eun Jiwon led a new group called Clover, including members Gilme and Mr. Tyfoon. Their debut song "La Vida Loca" was well-received, topping the Cyworld Music Chart just two weeks after the release.

On September 29, Clover released another digital single, "A Guy Who I Know" (아는 오빠).

In January 2012, Clover received Hip-Hop/Rap Award at the 21st Seoul Music Awards.

On August 14, Clover released its second digital single, "Pork Soup" (돼지국밥).

On November 18, 2013, Clover's third digital single, "Trickling" (주르륵) was released.

In 2013, Eun, Chun Myung-hoon, Tony An, Moon Hee-joon and Danny Ahn appeared on a new show on QTV called Handsome Boys of the 20th Century. The show was a performance project, forming the group HotSechGodRG — a portmanteau of each member's previous idol group names. The show received much attention and HotSechGodRG and the group continued to work together outside of the main show. They performed on various entertainment programs, such as Immortal Songs: Singing the Legend, Happy Together and Hwasin – Controller of the Heart (화신).

In May 2014, it was announced that HotSechGodRG would return for a new show in July. Moon Hee-joon, Eun Ji-won, Danny Ahn, and Chun Myung Hoon starred in a new show called W.I.S.H. (Where is My Super Hero?). It aired on OnStyle from July 19, 2014 to August 9, 2014.

==== 2016: Sechs Kies reunion ====
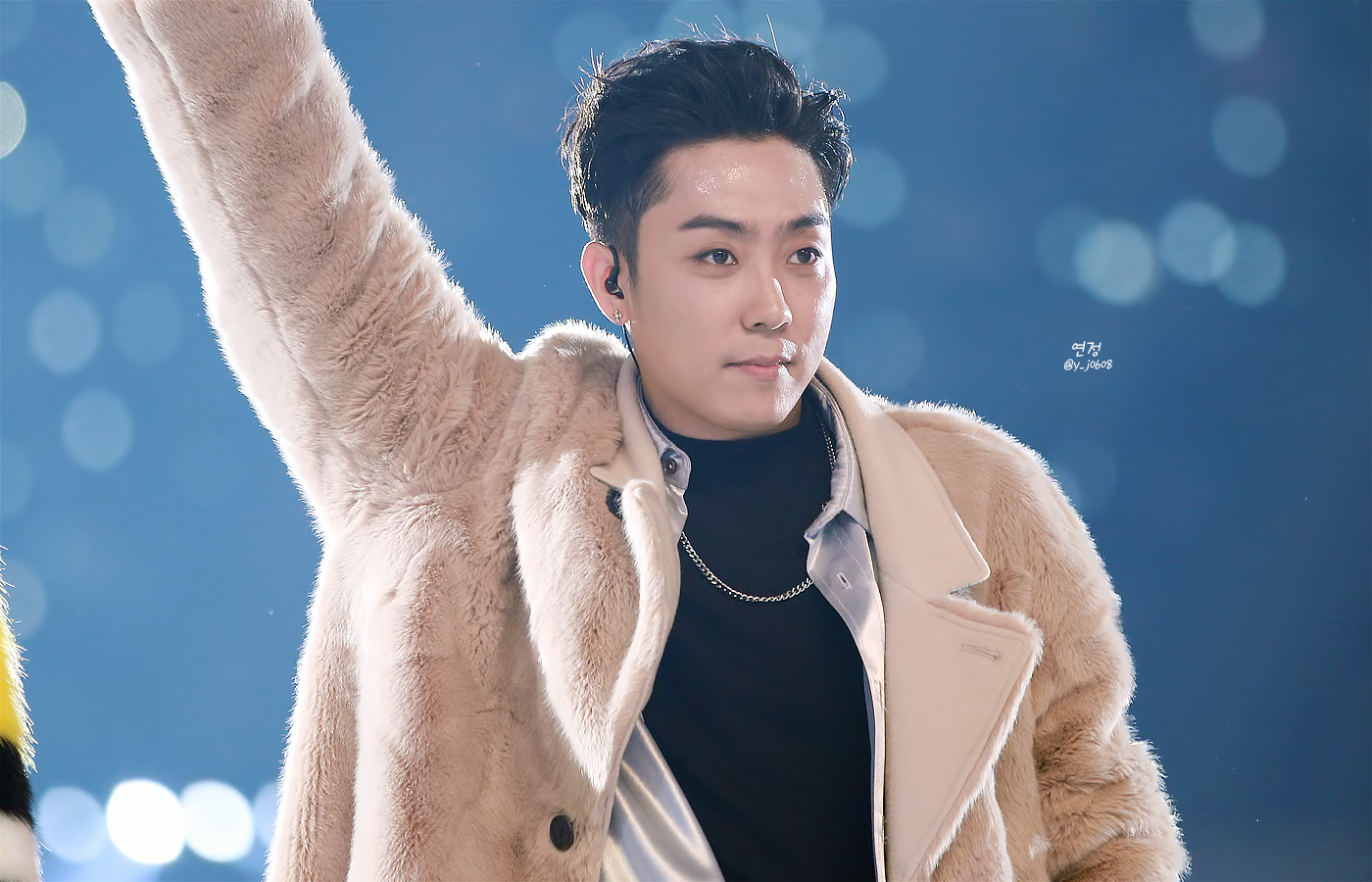
Eun Ji-won at 2016 Melon Music Awards

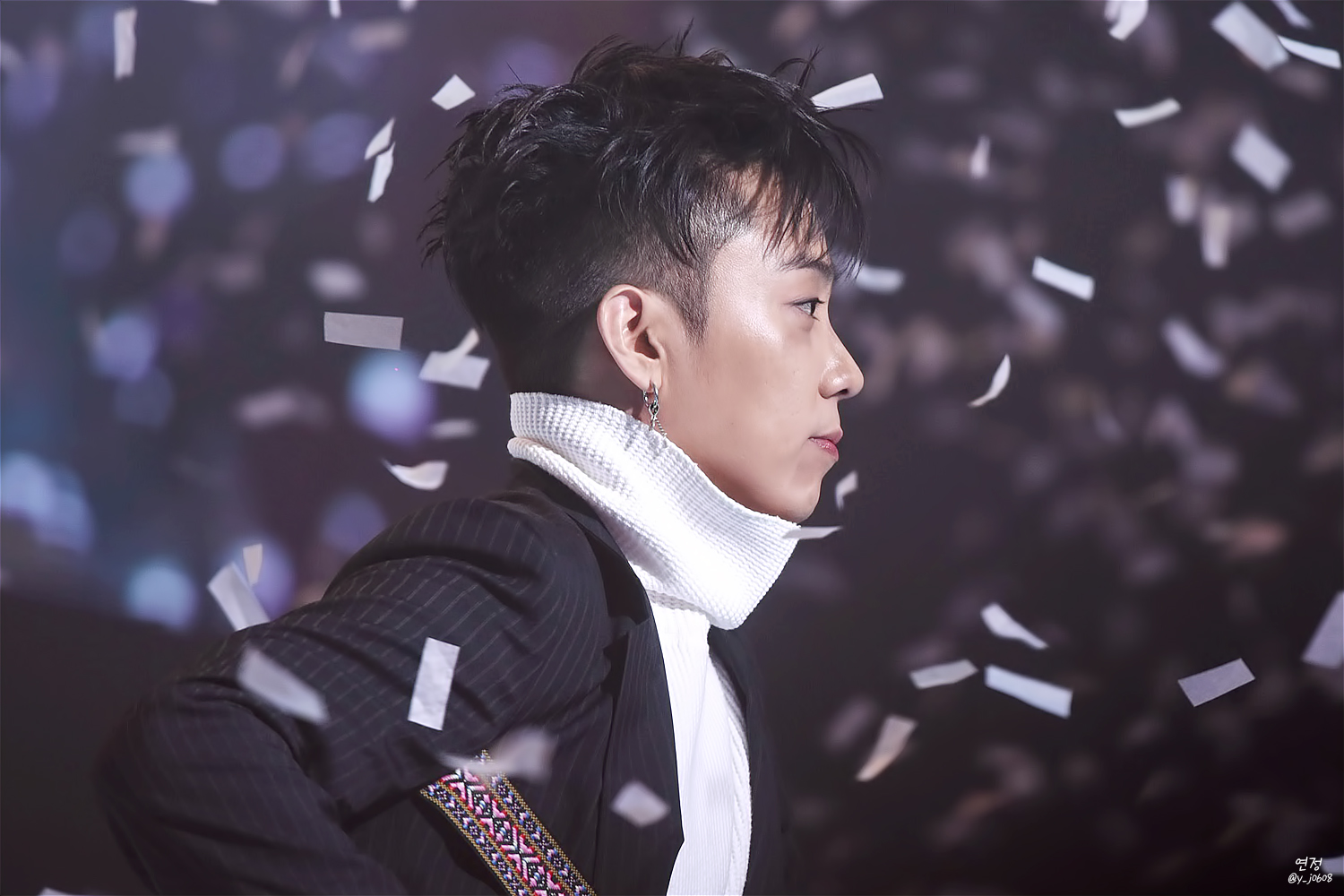
Eun Ji-won at Seoul Music Awards

On the Saturday, Saturday's, I Am A Singer segment of the show Infinite Challenge, Sechs Kies held a reunion concert on September 10 and 11 at the Olympic Gymnastics Arena. The group re-banded and signed a contract under YG Entertainment. The group's reunion went viral, sparking an influx of old and new fans to gather, resulting in their comeback concert tickets to sell out in only five minutes.

On October 7, 2016, Sechs Kies released a new digital single "Three Words" (세 단어) which topped all 8 major music charts shortly after release, achieving all-kill status. It also ranked high in Asian music charts and global iTunes in Taiwan and is among top tracks on iTunes charts in Hong Kong, Singapore, Malaysia, Thailand and more.

On November 23, YG announced that Sechs Kies' new album will be released on December 1. The new album "2016 Re-ALBUM" contains 10 past hit songs of SechsKies that were rearranged and remastered by YG producers, and is prepared a special gift for fans.

At the end of the year, Sechs Kies won several awards including Click! Star Wars Awards Hall of Fame, the 6th Gaon Chart Music Awards The Kpop Contribution of The Year, the 8th Melon Music Awards Hall of Fame, the 31st Golden Disc Awards Best Male Group Performance and the 26th Seoul Music Awards Bonsang.

==== 2017–2018: The 20th Anniversary ====
On March 18, Eun Jiwon announced the re-opening of his official fan club '1KYNE'. On March 28, he launched the official fanclub at 12 KST and over 30,000 fans logged onto the website, causing the site to crashed before they were able to register.

On April 19, YG announced that Sechs Kies' album The 20th Anniversary would be released on April 28, 2017. Along with the release of the album, the album topped multiple charts around the world, a new mark in their status as hallyu stars. Sechs Kies continued to hold consecutive wins for the title track "Be Well" on MBC Music Core and won #1 on KBS Music Bank.

On August 16, YG announced Eun Ji Won has officially signed an individual contract with YG Entertainment.

==== 2019: Solo comeback ====
On June 6, 2019, it was revealed the Eun would make a solo return to the music scene with his sixth album G1 on June 27. The lead single "I'm On Fire", featuring female vocalist Blue.D, was produced by YG producer Future Bounce and label-mate Winner's Mino, with lyrics written by Mino and Eun Ji-won himself.

2020–Present: Current Lineup and Future Plans

On January 28, 2020, Sechs Kies returned with their first mini album "All For You" following Kang Sung-hoon's withdrawal from the group. The group began to take a slower approach to music, leaning into ballads and old school R&B. The song won first place on Mnet M Countdown.

With their appearance on the variety program Three Meals for Four and with the help of Yoo Hee-yeol, the four starred in the project, Don't Look Back, documenting the making of the digital single "Don't Look Back," which was released on February 5, 2021. The song topped major music charts in Korea, including Bugs, Genie, and Vibe.

As of 2022, Eun continues to work as an entertainer on variety television, currently a fixed member on shows including Master in the House, Things That Make Me Groove Season 2, and Naked World History.

== Personal life ==
=== Marriages ===
In February 2010, Eun announced that he would marry his first love, a woman two years his senior. The two knew each other since 1994 and reunited 13 years later, and eventually getting married on April 20, 2010. By marriage, Eun and soccer player Lee Dong-gook became brother-in-laws. On February 28, 2013, Eun announced that he and his wife divorced in August 2012 due to differences in personality. It was later revealed that the couple never registered their marriage, and thus, were in a common-law marriage.

On June 12, 2025, YG Entertainment confirmed that Eun would marry again that year. Eun married in October.

== Criticism ==
Eun is the only member of Sechs Kies to face criticism since the disbandment for changing his musical genre from pop music to hip hop.

== Discography ==
=== Albums ===
- 2001: G Pop
- 2002: Money
- 2003: Eun Ji-won Best
- 2003: Drunken in Hip Hop
- 2005: The 2nd Round
- 2009: Platonic
- 2019: G1

== Music credits ==
Artist(s)	Song Information
Sechs Kies	"Fake-G" (절대자) - Road Fighter; "Run Away" - Road Fighter; "비(悲)" - Com' Back; "Bye..." - Blue Note; "Back Hug" (백허그) - Another Light
Eun Ji-won	"One, Two, Three" - G Pop; "Beautiful Times" (아름다운 시절) - G Pop; "U & Me" - G Pop; "Beautiful Days" (은지원 고고) - G Pop; "Memory" - G; "A.D 2050" - G; "A-Ha" - G; "Eun Ji Won Go! Go!" - Eun Ji Won 2; "DT.G.Zine" - Eun Ji Won 2; "Get Down" - Eun Ji Won 2; "Monologue" - Eun Ji Won 2; "Reload (Feat. Tyfoon, Gan-D, Juvie Train)" - The 2nd Round; "Gotta Go (Feat. Gary, Double K)" - The 2nd Round; "So Gone (Feat. T)" - The 2nd Round; "8t. Truck" - The 2nd Round; "Deep Blue (Feat. 샛별)" - 사랑사랑사랑; "Kill Me (Dangerous Part II) (Feat. Gilme)" - G Code; "Only You (너 하나) (Feat. Baby-G)" - G Code; "Dangerous" - G Code; "Soulmate (Feat. Gilme)" - TRAUMA; "Excuse (Feat. Jeremy)" - TRAUMA; "What U Are (Feat. Gilme)" - TRAUMA
Clover	"La Vida Loca" - Classic Over; "Better Day" - Classic Over; "ICE TRIM (ICE트림)" - Classic Over; "A Guy Who I Know" (아는 오빠) - A Guy Who I Know (아는 오빠); "Trickling" (주르륵) - Trickling (주르륵)
Gilme	"Shut ur MOUTH" - 2 Face; "Me First (내가 먼저) (Feat. Eun Ji-won)" - Me First (내가 먼저)
Epik High	"Open M.I.C. (Feat. Eun Ji-won, Dynamic Duo, TBNY, Tweak)" - High Society
Drunken Tiger	"Stubborn Person" (고집쟁이) - One Is Not a Lonely Word (하나하면 너와 나)
K.Will	"Present (선물) (Feat. Eun Ji-won)" - Present (선물)
Fin.K.L	"Your Memory" (너의 기억) - Special
Lee Soo-geun	"Let's Go As Far As We Can (갈때까지 가보자) (Feat. Eun Ji-won)" - Let's Go As Far As We Can (갈때까지 가보자); "Beautiful Lady (Feat. Eun Ji-won)" - Icontact
R.ef	"You Don't Seem to Know Love (사랑을 모르나봐) (Feat. Eun Ji-won)" - It's R.ef
Moon Ji Eun	"Yeouga (Feat. Eun Ji-won)" - Vivid
Stay	"Your Scent, Lips And Eyes (너의 향기와 입술과...눈빛) (Feat. Eun Ji-won)" - Thank You

== Filmography ==
=== Solo career ===
Year	Title
2001	MurMur (내게 오는 길)
2003	Drunken in Melody (만취 In Melody)
2005	All Famy/Owl (올빼미)
2005	Love Theory
2007	Adios
2008	Dangerous
2009	Siren
2010	While Buzzed (술김에)
2015	What U Are
2015	Trauma (트라우마)
2019	I'M ON FIRE (불나방)

=== Film ===
Year	Title	Role
1998	Seventeen	Kim Joon-tae
2004	Marrying a High-School Girl	Park On-dal
2009	The Missing Lynx	Lynx (dub)
2018	Sechskies Eighteen	Eun Ji-won

=== Dramas ===
Year	Title	Character	Notes
1997	Propose	Eun Ji-won	Cameo
2001–2003	Nonstop	Eun Ji-won	Special Guest
2003	Nonstop	Eun Ji-won	Special Guest
2003	Rooftop Room Snake	Lee Hyun-woo	
2007	New Heart	New Resident	Cameo
2012	Reply 1997	Do Hak-chan	
2013	Reply 1994	Do Hak-chan	Cameo
2016	Listen to Love		Cameo
2020	Hospital Playlist	Radio Show Host	Voice only, Episode 3

=== Host ===
Year	Show	Partner Host
2008–2009	SBS Inkigayo (SBS 인기가요)	Huh E-jae
2009	School Mobile World Cup (스쿨 문자지존)	Park Myung-soo, Park Jung-ah, Lee Min-woo, Yoon Hyung-bin
2009	Lord of the Rings (반지의 제왕)	Lee Soo-geun, Marco
2010–2013	[[Escape Crisis No.1|Escape Crisis No.1 (위기탈출 넘버원)]]	Kim Gook-Jin, Jo Woo-jong, Noh Hong-chul, Hwang Hyun-hee, Park Eun-young, Gil, Park Sung-kwang, Lee Chang-min, Boom, Kim Jun-hyun
2010	Idol League (대격돌! 아이돌 리그)	Moon Hee-joon
2010	Midnight Idol (오밤중의아이들)	Kim Chang-ryul, Hwang-bo, Kim Seong-su, Kim Hyung-jun
2011	Friday Planning (금요기획); Narration	
2012–2013	Three Idiots (세 얼간이)	Lee Soo-geun, Kim Jong-min
2012	Show Me the Money, Season 1	
2013	Show Me the Money, Season 2	
2013	Handsome Boys Communication - EunHee Clinic (미소년통신-은희상담소)	Moon Hee-joon
2013–2014	Immortal Songs 2 (불후의 명곡 전설을 노래하다)	Moon Hee-joon
2013–2015	Vitamin (비타민)	Lee Hwi-jae, Park Eun-young
2014	Same Age (동갑내기)	Kim Gu-ra, Moon Hee-joon, Brian Joo
2016	Plan Man (여행을 계획하는 자 : 플랜맨)	
2017	Plan Girl (플랜걸)	
2017	Plan Man: New Beginning Samcheok (플랜맨 뉴비기닝 삼척편)	
2017	Plan Man: New Beginning Kyushu (플랜맨 뉴비기닝 규슈편)	Jang Suwon
2017	Plan Man: New Beginning Hokkaido (플랜맨 뉴비기닝 북해도편)	Jang Suwon, Subin
2018	Coming Soon (천만홀릭, 커밍쑨)	Shin Dong-yup, Kyung-ri, Kim Ki-bang, Lee Won-seok
2018	Plan Man: The Hybrid (더하이브리드 (플랜맨X캐남))	Tony Ahn
2018	School Attack 2018 (스쿨어택 2018)	Son Dong-woon, JooE
2019	Stage K (스테이지K)	Jun Hyun-Moo, Joon Park, Sandara Park, Kim Yu-bin
2019	High School Lunch Cook-off (고교급식왕)	Baek Jong-won, Moon Se-yoon, Lee Na-eun
2020–2023	Game Eun Jiwon (게임은지원)	

=== Variety shows ===
Year	Title
2001–2005	Radio Report (전파견문록)
2003	Parody Theater Rooftop Room Snake (패러디극장 옥탑방 구렁이)
2003	Match Made in Heaven (강호동의 천생연분)
2005	Imagination Summer Expedition (상상원정대 여름특집)
2003–2005	X-Man (X맨)
2006–2008	Truth & False (있다! 없다?)
2007	Jiwhaza (작렬! 정신통일)
2007	Quiz Showdown! (퀴즈!육감대결)
2007	Are You Ready? (해피선데이: 준비됐어요)
2007–2012	1 Night 2 Days (1박 2일)
2007–2012	Come to Play (놀러와)
2008	Intimate Note Season 2 (절친노트 2)
2008–2009	Introducing the Star's Friend (스친소 서바이벌)
2009	Common Sense Scandal (상식 스캔들)
2010	Star Golden Bell (스타 골든벨)
2010	Sweet Potato (고구마)
2011	Celebrity Random Chance Marathon (연예인 복불복 마라톤 대회)
2011	Idol Clash: King of Magic (아이돌 대격돌 마법의제왕)
2012	Jewelry House (주얼리하우스)
2012	Leaping Through Time TV (시간을 달리는 TV)
2012	Music Interference (음악의 참견)
2013	Beauty and the Beast (최고의 커플 미녀와 야수)
2013	I Am Your Surrogate Angel (나는 당신의 대리천사)
2013	Handsome Boys of the 20th Century (20세기 미소년)
2013	Barefoot Friends (맨발의 친구들)
2013	Thank You (땡큐)
2013	The Genius 2 (더 지니어스: 룰 브레이커)
2014	Million Seller (밀리언셀러)
2014	Star Gazing (별바라기)
2014	W.I.S.H. (Where is My Super Hero?)
2014	First Day of Work (오늘부터 출근)
2015	The Human Condition 2 (인간의 조건 2)
2015	Welcome Back to School (학교 다녀오겠습니다)
2015	Law of the Jungle -Yap (정글의 법칙 in 얍)
2015	Our Neighborhood Arts and Physical Education - Swimming (우리동네 예체능)
2015	New Journey to the West (신서유기)
2015	The Capable Ones (능력자들)
2015	Mari And I (마리와 나)
2015–2016	My Money Partners - Next-door CEOs (나의 머니 파트너: 옆집의 CEO들)
2015–2016	Time Out (타임아웃)
2016	National Idol Singing Contest (전국 아이돌 사돈의 팔촌 노래자랑)
2016	Please Look After Me (청년! 대한민국 잘 부탁합니다)
2016	New Journey to the West Season 2 (신서유기 2)
2016	Strong Man (천하장사)
2016	Flower Crew (꽃놀이패)
2016	Gura Cha Cha Time Slip (구라차차 타임슬립 새소년)
2017	New Journey to the West Season 3 (신서유기 3)
2017	The Dynamic Duo (공조7)
2017	New Journey to the West Season 4 (신서유기 4)
2017	Kang's Kitchen (강식당)
2018	Unexpected Q (뜻밖의 Q)
2018	New Journey to the West Season 5 (신서유기 5)
2018	New Journey to the West Season 6 (신서유기 6)
2018	Cart Show 2 (카트쇼 2)
2018	Carefree Travellers Season 2 (현지 패키지로 세계일주)
2019	Kang's Kitchen Season 2 (강식당 2)
2019	Kang's Kitchen Season 3 (강식당 3)
2019	Sechskies What Happen in Bali (젝스키스 발리에서 생긴 일)
2019	Hunmanjeungeum (훈맨정음)
2019	High School Lunch Cook-off (고교급식왕)
2019	Perfect Combi (찰떡콤비)
2019	Naturally (자연스럽게)
2019	Three Meals in Iceland (삼시세끼 - 아이슬란드 간 세끼)
2019–2020	New Journey to the West Season 7 (신서유기 7)
2019–2020	Cabin Crew Season 2 (비행기 타고 가요 시즌 2)
2020	Friday Joy Package (금요일 금요일 밤에)
2020	Birds Of A Feather (끼리끼리)
2020	Sechskies Arcade (젝키 오락관)
2020	Seol Min-seok's Naked World History (벌거벗은 세계사)
2020	Three Meals for Four (삼시네세끼)
2020	New Journey to the West Season 8 (신서유기 8)
2021	Find the SechKEY (젝KEY를 찾아라)
2021	Spring Camp (신서유기 스페셜 스프링 캠프)
2021	Don't Look Back (뒤돌아보지 말아요)
2021	Mino Pilot - Lost (송민호의 분실)
2021	From the New World (신세계로부터)
2022	All Table Tennis! (올 탁구나!)
2022	I Can See Your Voice Season 9 (너의 목소리가 보여 시즌9)
2022–2023	Look, My Shoulder's Dislocated (내 어깨를 봐 탈골됐잖아)
2022–2023	Master in the House Season 2 (집사부일체)
2022–2023	Hot Goodbye (뜨겁게 안녕)
2022–present	Naked World History (벌거벗은 세계사)
2023	Golf Battle Birdie Buddies Season 5 (편먹고 공치리 시즌5)
2023	Divorced Singles 4 (돌싱글즈4)
2025	Divorced Singles 7 (돌싱글즈7)
2025	Three Idiots in Kenya (케냐 간 세끼)

=== Web shows ===
Year	Title	Role	Notes	Ref.
2022	Scene Catchers	Host		

== Endorsements ==
Year	Company Name	Brand Name	Item	Co-star
1997	Orion	Mr Hammer	Food	Sechs Kies
1998	Hyungji Elite	Elite	Uniform	Sechs Kies
2005	MLB	Strike Jeans	Clothing	
2008	Seoul	Public Service Announcement	PSA	
2008	Guggim	Guggim	Clothing	
2008	BHC	BHC Chicken	Food	MC Mong
2008	Peace Fiber	Nepa	Clothing	MC Mong
2008	Sporting21	New Era	Hat	
2008	Cheil Worldwide	Eye Level Education	Education	
2009	Samsung Tesco	Home Plus	Mall	Kang Ho-dong, Lee Soo-geun, MC Mong, Lee Seung-gi, Kim C
2009	Sunwon I com	Lynx Adventure	Movie	
2011–2015	Kyowon KRT	KRT	Travel Agency	
2012	Blizzard	World of Warcraft	Game	Jo Se-ho
2012	LG Corp	LG	Ultrabook	
2016	GS25	Your Fridge	Retail	
2017–2018	Diageo Korea	Guinness	Beer	Ahn Jaehyun
2019	DH Games	Idle Heroes	Game	
2019	SPC Samlip	Samlip Hobbang	Food	Lee Soo-geun

== Radio career ==
Year	Network	Title	Notes
1999	MBC FM4U	Sechskies' FM Plus (젝키의FM플러스)	w/ Sechskies members
2002–2003	MBC FM4U	Best Friends Radio (친한친구)	
2018	SBS Power FM	Cultwo Show (두시탈출 컬투쇼)	Guest Host
2019	YouTube	Eun Jiwon's Burning Radio Room	

Notes: Eun was the first DJ on MBC FM4U (친한 친구), from 2002 to 2003.

== Awards and nominations ==
Year	Award-Giving Body	Category	Result
2001	SBS Gayo Daejeon	Netizen Popularity Award	Won
2003	SBS Gayo Daejeon	Hip Hop Award	Won
2003	KMTV Korean Music Awards	Hip Hop Award	Won
2010	KBS Entertainment Awards	Best Entertainer	Won
2011	KBS Entertainment Awards	Best Entertainer	Nominated
2011	KBS Entertainment Awards	Daesang (awarded to all the 1 Night 2 Days members)	Won
2018	MBC Entertainment Awards	Top Excellence in Music & Talk	Nominated
2025	KBS Entertainment Awards	Best Entertainer Award (Reality)	Won

Awards and achievements
Preceded by Kim Sung Min; Kim Tae Won; Lee Ha Neul	KBS Entertainment Awards for Best Entertainer; 2010	Succeeded by -
