= Sechs Kies =

South Korean boy band

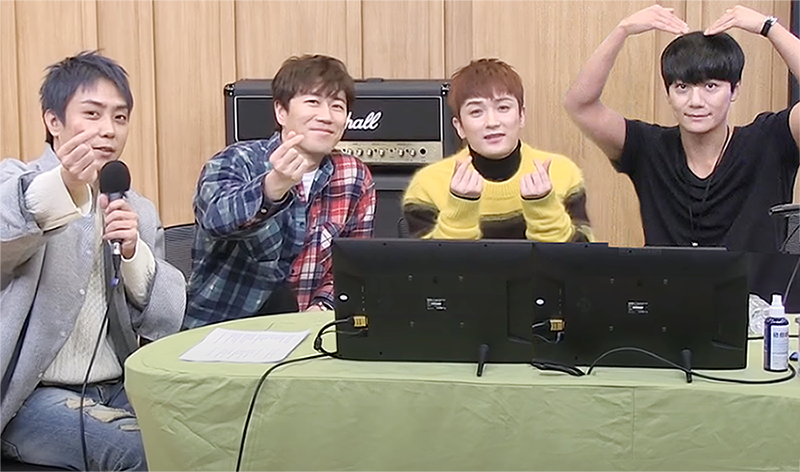
- Sechs Kies in 2020; From left to right: Eun Ji-won, Jang Su-won, Kim Jae-duck, Lee Jai-jin

Background information
- Origin: Seoul, South Korea
- Genres: K-pop; dance-pop; hip hop; R&B
- Years active: 1997–2000; 2016–2021; 2026–present
- Labels: DSP; YG
- Members: Eun Ji-won; Lee Jai-jin; Kim Jae-duck; Ko Ji-yong; Jang Su-won
- Past members: Kang Sung-hoon

Sechs Kies (pronounced as /ˈzɛkskiːs/ ZEKS-kees; Korean: 젝스키스) is a first generation South Korean boy band. Making their debut on April 15, 1997, they are one of the first K-pop idol groups, credited with pioneering the idol scene and fandom culture. The group consists of the following members, Eun Ji-won, Lee Jai-jin, Kim Jae-duck, Ko Ji-yong, and Jang Su-won.

Sechs Kies formally disbanded on May 20, 2000, after three years of activity. On April 14, 2016, the group reunited for a performance as part of the show Infinite Challenge. On May 10, 2016, five of the six members signed a contract with YG Entertainment to continue promoting, while member Ko Ji-yong remained retired from the industry. After the release of the group's fifth full album, Another Light, member Kang Sung-hoon also left the group in 2019. The group has remained inactive since 2021, with their YG Entertainment profile being deleted in 2024.

== Formation ==
Eun Ji-won was scouted at a nightclub by DSP Entertainment's CEO while studying abroad in Hawaii, along with Kang Sung-hoon. The agency originally planned to debut Eun Ji-won and Kang Sung-hoon in South Korea as a duo, but with the success of SM Entertainment's male idol group H.O.T., the agency shifted gears to debut a six-member male idol group instead.

Kim Jae-duck and Lee Jai-jin at the time were members of a dance crew called Quicksilver in Busan and trainees at Seo Taiji and Boys Lee Juno's company. Daesung Entertainment's CEO Lee Ho-Yeon recruited the two through recommendation of Lee Juno. Jang Su-won was cast during an open audition, and lastly, Ko Ji-yong, a childhood friend of Kang Sung-hoon, was cast as the final member of Sechs Kies.

== Career ==
=== 1997: Debut, School Anthem and Welcome to the Sechskies Land ===
Sechs Kies debuted on April 15, 1997, on KMTV Show! Music Tank with their first single, "School Anthem" (also known as "School Byeolgok", "School Song", or "학원별곡" in Korean). Their debut album School Anthem, named after the title track, was released on May 15.

Multiple songs from School Anthem became immensely popular, including "School Anthem", "Remember Me", and "The Way This Guy Lives - Pomsaengpomsa". OhmyNEWS reported that over 1,800,000 copies of the album were sold. The physical sales of Sechs Kies's albums remain unclear because of DSP's under-reporting and official records being unavailable for albums released before September 1998. For further information on Sechs Kies's album sales record, read Sechs Kies discography.

Shortly afterwards, Sechs Kies made their much anticipated comeback in October on KMTV's Recharge 100% Show and began promotional activities for their second album release. Their second album was titled Welcome to the Sechskies Land, featuring 20 tracks formatted as a tour around a fictional amusement park known as "Sechskies Land", and was released on November 1. They quickly began promoting the album's title track "Chivalry" (기사도) on various music programs, which gave the group their first number one spot on SBS Inkigayo on December 7.

Sechs Kies quickly achieved recognition as rookies of the year and received several awards at various music award shows. In December, they won the 12th Korea Visual and Records Grand Prize (later named Golden Disc Awards) Bonsang, the KMTV Korean Music Awards New Artist Award, the Seoul Music Awards Bonsang, the KBS Music Awards Bonsang, the Best 10 Artist Awards at the MBC and the SBS Music Awards.

On December 21, Sechs Kies held their first concert in Seoul at the Sejong Center for the Performing Arts; tickets were reportedly sold out within five hours. Sechs Kies was the first dance group to hold a concert at the center.

=== 1998: Rising popularity, Road Fighter and Special Album ===
Sechs Kies's fanbase and general popularity continued to grow rapidly in 1998. After wrapping up their second album promotions in February, they began a spring nationwide tour, including concerts in Busan, Ulsan, Gwangju, and Daegu.

In March, Sechs Kies became the first idol group to film their own movie, titled Seventeen. On July 17, it was released nationwide, and the group held promotional fan signing events for the film's premiere release Moreover, Sechs Kies starred in the children's musical, Alibaba and the 40 Thieves, alongside singer Jinjoo. The musical ran from April 25 to May 5 at the Sejong Center. On May 5, Sechs Kies performed the musical in front of President Kim Dae-jung at Blue House to celebrate Children's Day.

On July 15, Sechs Kies released their third studio album Road Fighter, which had more hybridized elements of hip-hop and electronica, as leader Eun Jiwon participated in the production of the album. Sechs Kies began promotions for their third album, returning with "Crying Game" on SBS Inkigayo. Sechs Kies held consecutive wins for the title track "Road Fighter" on SBS Inkigayo and KBS Music Bank in July and August. They also won for the number one spot on SBS Inkigayo and KBS Music Bank for the follow-up track "Reckless Love" (무모한 사랑) in September and October.

On October 30, Sechs Kies released a soundtrack for Seventeen, titled Special Album, also known as the group's 3.5 album release. They began promotions for Special Album on KBS Music Bank, promoting two songs from the album, "Couple" (커플) and "Letting You Go" (너를 보내며). They also won the #1 spot on SBS Inkigayo, KBS Music Bank and MBC Music Camp for the title track "Couple" which was the most popular song. A special photo book was released in conjunction with the album in November.

With the huge success of the song, "Couple", Sechs Kies won the 9th Seoul Music Awards Daesang along with rival boy group H.O.T. Sechs Kies also won the 13th Korea Visual and Records Grand Prize Award Bonsang, the KBS Music Awards Artist Of The Year (Teen Category), the 9th Seoul Music Awards Bonsang, the Popularity Awards at the MBC and the KMTV Korean Music Awards, and the SBS Music Awards Best 10 Artist Awards.

=== 1999: Musical outreach, Com' Back ===
Sechs Kies toured Korea in February, 1999. On April 5, Sechs Kies released their first concert video, recorded at the Seoul Concert on February 25. They also released a live concert album with the video on April 10. After their concert tour, Sechs Kies returned to the studio to record their fourth album, Com’Back.

On November 30, Sechs Kies participated in the 1st Korea China Music Festival, co-hosted by KBS and CCTV in Beijing. On December 5, Sechs Kies also performed in the 2000 Peace Friendship Music Concert in Pyongyang, North Korea, becoming one amongst a group of the first South Korean dance groups to perform in North Korea.

At the end of the year, Sechs Kies won several awards including the 14th Korea Visual and Records Grand Prize Award Bonsang, the 10th Seoul Music Awards Bonsang, Bonsang at the KMTV Korean Music Awards and KBS Music Awards, and the Best 10 Artist Awards at the MBC and the SBS Music Awards.

=== 2000: Disbandment, Blue Note ===
On January 12, 2000, Sechs Kies had a 1000th day celebration party with their fans. On February 28, Sechs Kies's Seoul Concert was held in Olympic Gymnastics Arena; tickets were reportedly sold out within a few hours. Sechs Kies members participated in directing the concert and performed self-composed songs. A concert DVD was also released.

On May 18, Sechs Kies held a sudden press conference to officially announce their disbandment. Sechs Kies's final performance was at the Dream Concert on May 20. On May 31, Sechs Kies released Blue Note, a compilation of "Best Of" songs that served as a farewell album to fans. In August, the members of Sechs Kies self-released one final track and music video titled "Thanks" for their fans, which was uploaded online.

=== 2016: Reunion, "Three Words" and 2016 Re-ALBUM ===
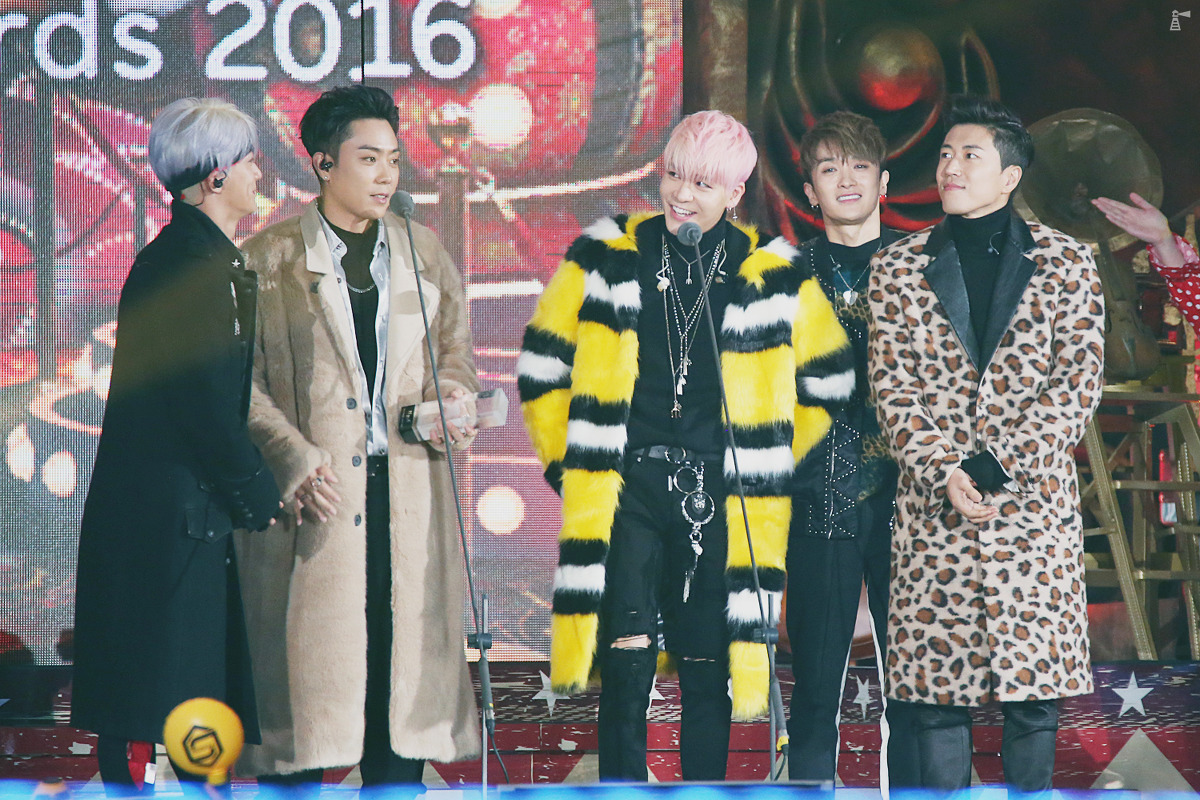
Sechs Kies at the 8th MelOn Music Awards in November 2016

On April 14, 2016, as part of the popular Korean variety show Infinite Challenge, Sechs Kies re-united through a guerilla reunion concert at the Seoul World Cup Stadium, which was attended by approximately 6,000 fans who were alerted of the concert only five hours before it was held. On May 11, YG Entertainment announced that the company had signed contracts with five of the members, with the exception of Ko Ji-yong, who is now a businessman and no longer active in the entertainment industry. Lee Jai-jin and Kang Sung-hoon also signed individual contracts with YG Entertainment. Concerts on September 10 and 11 at the Olympic Gymnastics Arena were sold out within five minutes.

On October 7, Sechs Kies released their new digital single "Three Words" (세 단어). It topped all eight major domestic music charts (Bugs, Genie, Melon, Mnet, Monkey3, NAVER Music, Olleh, and Soribada) shortly after release. "Three Words" also topped the Gaon Digital Chart, Download Chart and BGM (Background Music) Chart for the first week of October. It also took the number one spot on QQMusic, the largest music streaming site in China.

A new album, 2016 Re-ALBUM, was released on December 1. It contained ten rearranged old songs, along with "Three Words" as a bonus track. Multiple songs on the album performed well on the domestic charts.

Sechs Kies held their first national concert tour since their reunion, titled "Yellow Note", from September 10 to January 22, 2017. Concerts were held in Busan, Daegu, and Seoul. The last two concerts, named "Yellow Note Final in Seoul", were held on January 21 and 22 at the Jamsil Indoor Stadium. On December 22, all 13,000 tickets were sold out within three minutes.

At the end of the year, Sechs Kies won several awards including Click! Star Wars Awards Hall of Fame, the 6th Gaon Chart Music Awards K-pop Contribution/Lifetime Achievement, the 8th Melon Music Awards Hall of Fame, the 31st Golden Disc Awards Best Male Group Performance, and the 26th Seoul Music Awards Bonsang.

=== 2017: A new beginning, The 20th Anniversary and Another Light ===
The 20th Anniversary was released on April 28, 2017. The anniversary album entered the Billboard World Albums chart at number nine. "Be Well" (아프지 마요), one of the title songs, reached number one on several domestic music charts upon its release.

As part of their 20th anniversary celebrations, a Sechs Kies exhibition entitled "Yellow Universe" ran from April 28 to May 28, showcasing artwork by Lee Jai-jin, collected items from the band's earlier active years, as well as contents from their comeback. Additionally, Sechs Kies held two fan meetings, both named "YellowKies Day" after their official fan club, at the SK Olympic Handball Gymnasium in Seoul on July 15. On June 26, minutes after YellowKies Day tickets were released, all 14,000 tickets were sold out.

On May 12, YG Entertainment announced Sechs Kies's debut in Japan, 20 years after their debut in South Korea. The Japanese edition of the anniversary album, which contained the Japanese versions of title songs "Be Well", "Sad Song" (슬픈 노래), and "Three Words" was released on July 19. Fan meetings were held for Japanese fans at the Yokohama Bay Hall in Kanagawa on July 23 and at the Namba Hatch in Osaka on September 3; all 4,400 tickets were sold out within a few minutes.

On September 21, Sechs Kies released their long-awaited fifth album, Another Light. It entered the Billboard World Albums chart at number 10, and was successful domestically as well, ranking at number 10 on the Gaon October album chart. The title song "Something Special" (특별해) held the number 1 spot on the Gaon BGM Chart for six consecutive weeks, and achieved a double crown on Gaon for the month of October, ranking number 1 on both the digital and BGM charts, as well as reaching number 2 on the Gaon monthly download chart.

Sechs Kies held their 20th anniversary concert on September 23 at the Seoul Gocheok Sky Dome.

On August 16, YG Entertainment announced that it had signed an exclusive contract with Eun Ji-won. On November 6, Jang Su-won became the fourth member to sign an exclusive contract with YG Entertainment.

Following their Seoul anniversary concert, Sechs Kies held a 20th anniversary concert tour, performing across Korea in Gwangju (December 9), Goyang (December 23 to 24), Busan (December 30), and in Daegu (January 6 of the following year).

Sechs Kies performed as the closing act at the Busan One Asia Festival (BOF) opening ceremony on October 22. At the BOF closing ceremony, they received the Legend Star award together with YellowKies, who were awarded "Best Fandom" for their support of the group over the past 20 years.

=== 2018: Sechskies Eighteen and Sunghoon's departure ===
Sechs Kies successfully concluded their 20th anniversary concert in Daegu on January 6.

On January 17, it was announced that YG Entertainment had successfully registered "Sechs Kies" with the Korea Intellectual Property Rights Information Service (KIPRIS) as an official trademark on April 24, 2017, allowing Sechs Kies members to exercise exclusive rights to the band name.

Towards the end of December 2017, a teaser for the film Sechskies Eighteen was released. The film release was officially announced on January 5.The documentary follows Sechs Kies as they prepared for their fifth studio album Another Light; it was filmed using ScreenX technology and opened in select CGV theaters on January 18 in Seoul, Incheon, Jeju, Changwon and Yongin. On January 9, tickets for a January 11 preview screening of the film sold out in 4 minutes. According to the Korean Film Council, the film ranked first in seat sales for the month of February, selling 91.4% of seats available. By March 25, over 50,000 tickets to Sechskies Eighteen were sold; to commemorate the milestone as well as the band's 21st anniversary, Sechs Kies announced that a "Fan Festival" would be held from April 1 to 15 across 7 cities (Seoul, Daejeon, Jeonju, Daegu, Ulsan, Gwangju, and Busan), offering free screenings of the 2016 Yellow Note concert, the 2017 Yellowkies Day fan event, and both New Kies shows (New Kies on the Busan and New Kies on the Honolulu) in collaboration with Danaflix.

On February 14, Sechs Kies received the Song of the Year - September award at the 7th Gaon Chart Music Awards for the title song "Something Special" from their fifth album Another Light.

On May 28, at the request of Yellowkies (Sechs Kies dcinside fan gallery), Ko Ji-yong was removed from Sechs Kies profile by YG Entertainment.

On September 21, YG Entertainment announced that Kang Sunghoon would not be participating in Sechs Kies activities due to ongoing scandals, and in their statement, mentioned that the group was recording new music at the time, having to push back the release date as the result of the scandals. The group later performed without Sunghoon on October 14 of that year, where they confirmed they would soon come back, and were in the midst of picking new songs for the album.

As of December 31, Kang Sung-hoon left the team because of the scandals that he made. with the termination of his exclusive contract from YG and from this time onwards Sechskies became a four-member group.

=== 2019–2024: All For You and Three Meals For Four ===
Eun Ji-won's solo album was released on June 27, and preparations for a new song for Sechskies are in progress, and various contents are prepared in the summer. They are preparing for a comeback with a new formation of four-member.

On November 14, it was confirmed that the comeback video was filmed and the group had yet to decide on a release date for the album.

The album release date was eventually revealed on January 7. The album titled, All for You was announced on January 12, 2020, with the title track's details released two days later. They made a comeback on January 28. It is also the first album after reorganization as a four-member and the first mini-album after 23 years of debut. The title songs are ALL FOR YOU, ALL FOR YOU, DREAM, MEANINGLESS, ROUND & ROUND, and WALKING IN THE SKY. On the February 6, 2020 episode of "M Countdown", Sechs Kies won first place with "All For You".

Eun Jiwon asked Na Young Seok PD to make a variety show for Sechskies as the compensation for channel 채널 십오야 commitment to the moon, as the first project related to Eun Jiwon. The program started airing from May 15, 2020. It is a high-speed camping life for 3 days and 2 nights to eat three meals of four Sechskies, who have never been in a camp since their debut! Self-sufficient high-speed camp life <삼시네세끼 - Three meals for Four>. This is Na Young-seok PD's fourth hybrid platform broadcast. Again, only part of the entire volume is edited and broadcast for 5 minutes on TV. After the TV broadcast ends, the entire volume will be released through the YouTube channel '채널 십오야 '.

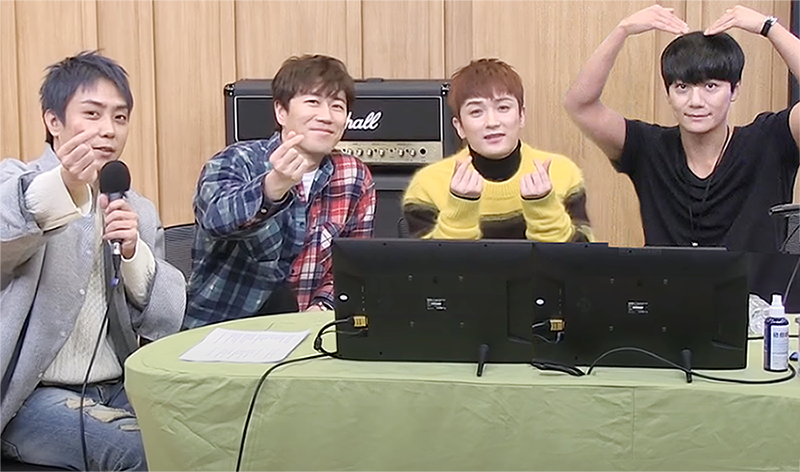
Sechskies in 2020 - Cult Two Show

During the front yard live on the recording day of 3 meals for four, Yoo Hee-yeol and PD Na Young-suk made a pledge, but Yoo Hee-yeol made a pledge to let Sechskies come to the antenna and record a ballad song if the number of antenna music subscribers exceeds 150,000. The number of subscribers to Antenna Music exceeded 150,000, so Yoo Hee-yeol decided to give Sechskis a new song. In the live broadcast of PD Na Young-seok, which was held at the end of December, he mentioned that this is the first time after 7 years Yoo Hee-yeol wrote and composed the song, and the song was for Sechskies. In addition, it was mentioned that the related contents would be broadcast on January 22 (Fri), 2021 with the title of Don't Look Back, with a five-minute broadcast and the subtitle as : Yoo Hee-yeol x Jekki decided to sing a ballad as a pledge, but somehow, things got bigger and a new song was made, and a song containing the feelings of all of us came out.

The digital single "Don't Look Back" (뒤돌아보지말아요) was released on February 5, 2021 on major music platforms with the MV was released during the live on channel with Sechskies members and Na PD. And couple hours after the song reached number 1 realtime in Genie and Bugs music chart.

In January 2024, the group's artist profile was removed from YG, signifying the group's no longer under the label.

=== 2026–present: 30th anniversary ===
On October 30, 2026, it was announced that Sechskies members Jang Suwon, Lee Jaein, and Ko Jiyong would reunite for a show titled "THE TREE in INSPIRE — Sechs Kies' Untold Stories," on December 15 and 16th. While members Jiwon and Jaeduck will not be present at the event, Suwon referred to it as "warming up before dancing for the 30th anniversary."

== Controversy ==
Sechs Kies' disbandment was suddenly announced without a clear explanation at the height of their career, resulting in a widespread rumor that disbandment was enforced by DSP. However, each member has talked about the truth of disbandment several times through various media channels. Lee Jai-jin stated similar to the rumor, but other members clearly stated that it was not true. Lee Jai-jin mentioned that what Sechs Kies members wanted was to change their agency and not disband at a Korean variety show in 2005. Eun Ji-won, on the other hand, said that the members had decided it would be best to disband at the peak of their career. In 2015, Kang Sung-hoon mentioned that the members had agreed to disband at the peak of their career. At a concert in 2015, Kang Sung-hoon stated that Sechs Kies seems to have left a strong impression for having disbanded at the peak of their career. However, he also added that he had disliked the idea of disbandment as well. Jang Su-won and Kim Jae-duck have also mentioned several reasons for disbandment. They had an opportunity to talk about the disbandment all together during an interview on October 17, 2016. Eun Ji-won stated that the disbandment was decided upon agreement by a majority of the members, though Lee Jai-jin was one of the members that stood against the disbandment.

At Sechs Kies' last performance, fans mistook reporter Jo Young Goo's car for CEO of DSP Lee Ho-yeon's car, vandalizing the property. Given the young age of the fans, Jo Young Goo opted against filing a complaint against them. Lee Ho-yeon paid him 11 million won as compensation on their behalf.

== Members ==
=== Current ===
Black Kies

- Eun Ji-won – leader, rapper, vocalist (1997–2000; 2016–2021)
- Lee Jai-jin – rapper, dancer (1997–2000; 2016–2021)
- Kim Jae-duck – rapper, dancer (1997–2000; 2016–2021; 2026–present)

White Kies

- Ko Ji-yong – vocalist, rapper (1997–2000; 2016–2018; 2026–present) (Note: Despite not performing with Sechskies during their first reunion, Ko Ji Yong was still considered an official member of the group until he was removed from their profile at the request of the group's fanbase in 2018.)
- Jang Su-won – vocalist (1997–2000; 2016–2021; 2026–present)

=== Former ===
- Kang Sung-hoon – vocalist (1997–2000; 2016–2019)

== Discography ==
Studio albums

- School Anthem (학원별곡) (1997)
- Welcome to the SechsKies Land (1997)
- Road Fighter (1998)
- Special Album (1998)
- Com’Back (1999)
- Another Light (2017)

Remake albums

- 2016 Re-ALBUM (2016)
- The 20th Anniversary (2017)

== Tours ==
The South Korean idol group Sechs Kies (also known as SechsKies or Sechskies) has held four tours and four fan meetings since their debut in 1997.

== Filmography ==
=== Reality show ===
Year	Title	Network
2017	No Foundation Youth Trip	kt Olleh
2017	No Foundation Youth Trip 2	kt Olleh
2018	Heart Racing Nice Shot	Olleh TV
2019	What Happened in Bali	Olleh TV
2020	Sechskies For You	YouTube
2020	Sechskies Arcade	kt Olleh
2020	Three Meals for Four	tvN
2021	Find the SECHkey	seezn
2021	Don't Look Back	tvN

=== Film ===
Year	Title
1998	Seventeen
2018	Sechskies Eighteen
