= Kang Sung-hoon (singer) =

South Korean singer (born 1980)

- 강성훈
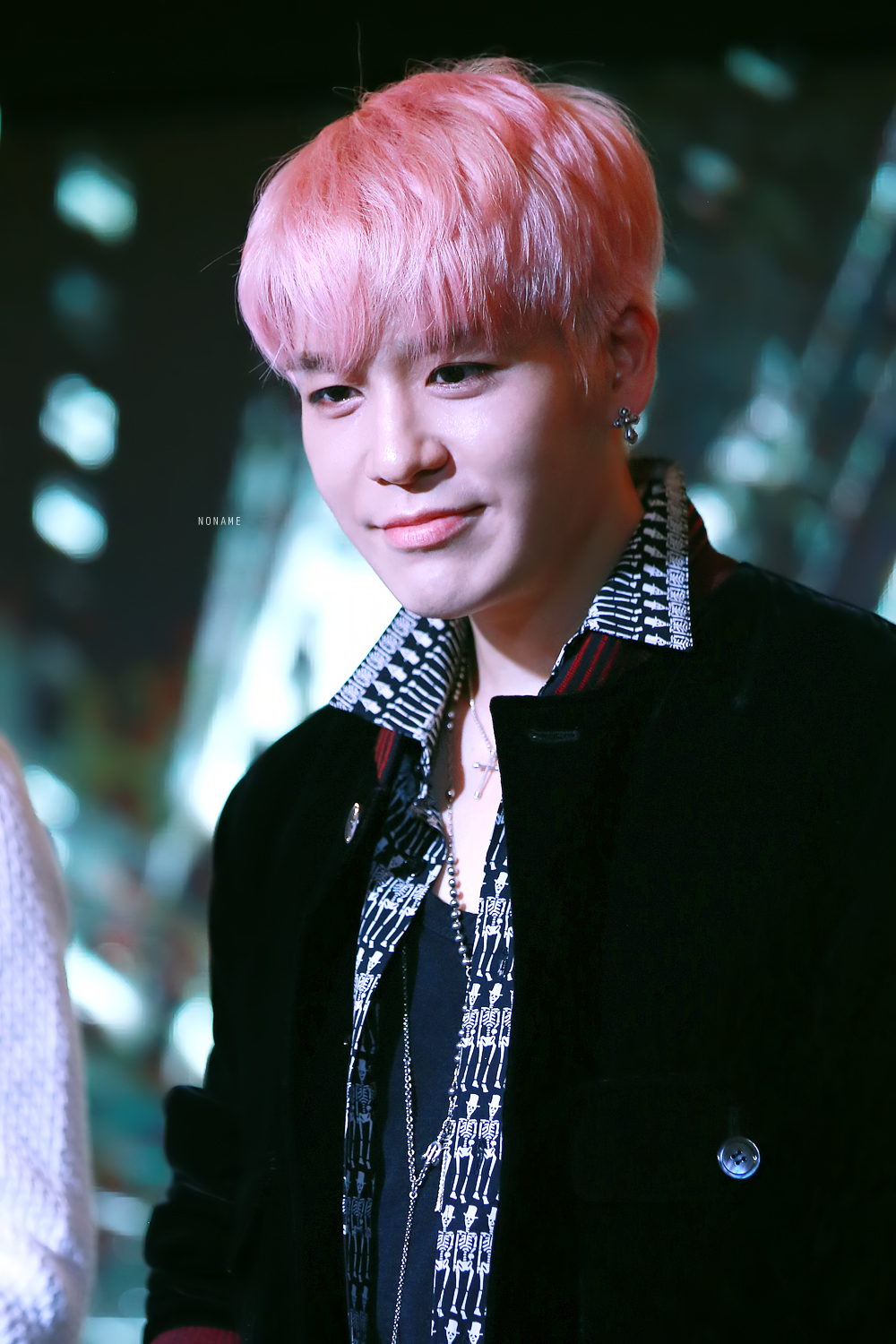
- Kang in October 2016
- Born: February 22, 1980 (age 46); Seoul, South Korea
- Occupation: Singer
- Years active: 1997–present
- Musical career
- Genre: K-pop
- Instrument: Vocals
- Labels: DSP Media; Laful; YG
- Formerly of: Sechs Kies

Korean name
- Hangul: 강성훈
- Hanja: 姜成勳
- RR: Gang Seonghun
- MR: Kang Sŏnghun

Kang Sung-hoon (Korean: 강성훈, born February 22, 1980) is a South Korean singer, best known as a former member of the 90s South Korean boy group Sechs Kies. While in Sechskies, Kang was the main vocalist. After SechsKies had disbanded in 2000, Kang pursued a solo singing career, signed under Laful Entertainment at the time. His nickname Hoony is the title for his third album. Kang joined Sechskies for their reunion in 2016, but left the group in early 2019 due to ongoing scandals.

== Career ==
=== SechsKies ===
Kang Sung-hoon, who was studying abroad in Hawaii, was scouted by DSP Entertainment, along with friend Eun Ji-won in a nightclub. They were supposed to debut as a duo. However, as H.O.T. became successful, DSP decided to make a six-member male idol group. But Kang refused to join the six-member group. Lee Ho-yeon, the DSP CEO, persuaded Kang Sung-hoon by giving him right of veto. Accordingly, the other 4 members was selected with Kang's consent.

SechsKies debuted on April 15, 1997 on KMTV Show! Music Tank with their first single, "School Byeolgok (학원별곡)".

Kang was the main vocalist of SechsKies. Since he was outgoing, he spoke most in the TV programs. Sechs Kies achieved great success and became an icon of the 1990s Korean idol groups. However, Sechs Kies suddenly disbanded in 2000 after finishing their fourth album promotion.

=== Solo ===
After SechsKies disbanded, Kang was the second member of the group to begin a solo career mainly in R&B and ballad. In 2001, he released his first album 비상(Bee Sang) with the title song "고백(Confessions)" and most of the Sechs Kies members chorus "1년 되는 날 (1st Anniversary)".

In 2002, Kang released his second album Kang Sung Hoon Vol.2 with the hit song "My Girl" and received positive attention. He won the 2002 SBS Gayo Daejeon Popularity Award with J-Walk.

On January 22, 2007 Kang participated in a fashion show called, "Han Bok", which was to raise money to build homes for others. Sung-hoon invested in entertainment industry but has been involved in some messy legal battles for a few years. Finally, he put behind legal troubles and released a re-recording of the hit single "couple" in 2014.

On June 12, 2015, Kang released "Someone Make Me Laugh" for SBS weekend drama Divorce Lawyer In Love OST.

On February 20, 2016, Kang held small Concert The Fifth Season in Seogang University, Mary Hall Grand Theatre; tickets were reportedly sold out within one minute.

=== 2016–present: Sechs Kies reunion and departure ===
In 2016, SechsKies reunited after their disbandment 16 years prior in a Korean variety TV show called Infinite Challenge. They held a pop-up reunion concert on April 14, the day before the anniversary of Sechs Kies' debut. Although it was extremely short notice, almost 6000 fans gathered within a few hours to the stadium to see the reunion concert.

On May 11, YG Entertainment officially announced that they signed a contract with Sechs Kies except for Ko Ji-yong. Sung-hoon also signed a solo contract with YG Entertainment.

On May 21 and June 25, Kang held small fan meeting with 4,000 fans to celebrated his solo debut 15th anniversary at Seoul and Busan Citizens Hall.

On February 25, 2017, Kang celebrated his birthday party with 3,000 fans at KBS Arena Hall.

On May 28, Kang held small fan meeting "Back to the songs, Back to you" with 1,300 fans to celebrated his solo debut 16th anniversary at Bluesquare, Samsung Card Hall.

On January 1, 2019, Kang released a statement via his official fan cafe that he had agreed with YG to terminate his contract as of December 31, 2018 and left Sechs Kies.

On December 22, Kang released a new single titled, "You Are My Everything."

== Discography ==
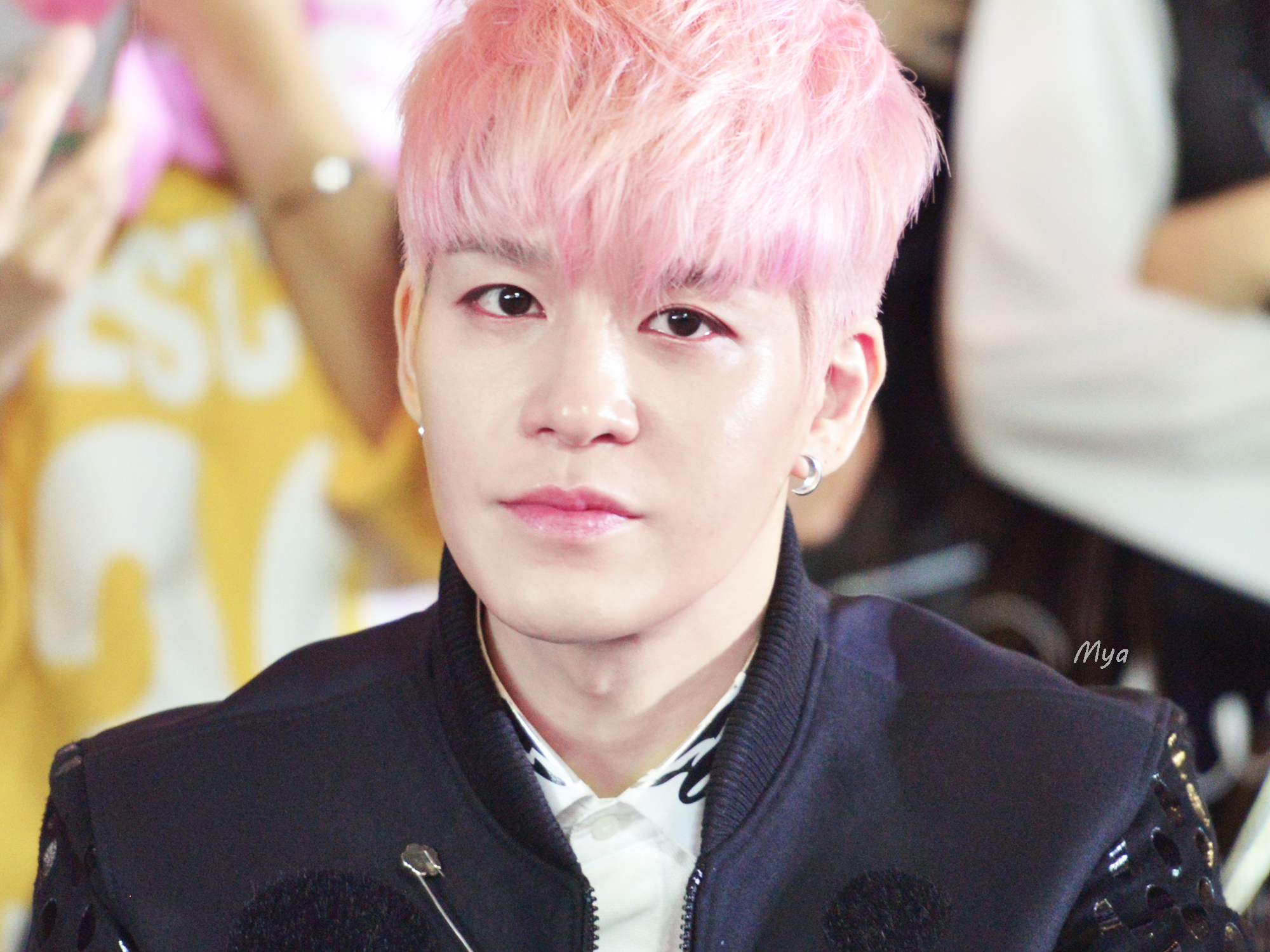
161020 Kang at Seoul Fashion Week

=== Albums ===
Album #	Album information	List
1st	First Album Fly (비상(飛翔)): Issue date: 2001/5/25; language: Korean language	List: 1. 축복; 2. So Da; 3. 영원히; 4. 오직 너 5. 1년 되는 날 (1st Anniversary); 6. Dreamer; 7. 지난 1년 동안은...; 8. 그대만은; 9. 고백; 10. 추억; 11. 별을 수놓는 남자; 12. True Heart; 13. 변심; 14. My Love; 15. Love Is Over; 16. Greatest Gift
2nd	Second Album Kang Sung Hoon Vol.2: Issue date: 2002/4/1; language: Korean language	List: 1. Intro; 2. My Girl; 3. Miracle; 4. My Love; 5. Endless; 6. 사랑은 없다; 7. 혼자쓰는 사랑; 8. 네가 없는날 위해; 9. Lady; 10. If; 11. 회상; 12. 이미 시작된 사랑; 13. 우리의 아픔 그리고 추억
3rd	Third Album Hoony 003: Issue date: 2003/6/25; language: Korean language	List: 1. 엉덩이가 예뻐요; 2. 아껴둔 이야기(Radio Edit Ver.); 3. 연습; 4. One More Chance; 5. 왜 6. 소녀의 주인; 7. 베르테르; 8. 매듭; 9. Set You Free; 10. 사랑합니다; 11. I'm Sorry; 12. 사랑증후군; 13. Be Happy; 14. 아껴둔 이야기(Full Ver.); 15. 엉덩이가 예뻐요 (Inst.)
4th	Four Album Everlasting: Issue date: 2004/3/25; language: Korean language	List: 1. 나의 축복; 2. 아무 일도 아닌 듯 3. 그것밖에 (Feat. 방윤희); 4. 보이지 않는 인사 (해금 ver.); 5. With You; 6. 끝인가요; 7. 문 8. Just; 9. Blue Way; 10. 사랑할 때 겪어야 할 일들; 11. 사랑 이별 그리고..; 12. 은하수 (큰 사랑을 얻다); 13. 보이지 않는 인사 (Accordion ver.); 14. 보이지 않는 인사 (inst.); 15. 그것밖에 (inst.)

=== Single ===
- 2014: "Couple" (Remake)
- 2019: "You Are My Everything"
- 2021: "Can't Stay Apart"

=== Others ===
- 2015: "Someone Make Me Laugh (날 웃게 한 사람)", Divorce Lawyer in Love OST

== Music credits ==
Artist(s)	Song Information
Sechs Kies	"The Gift She Left Behind (그녀가 남기고 간 선물)" - Com` Back; "Promise (약속)" - Blue Note; "My Love" - Live Concert
Kang Sung-hoon	"Our Pain And Memories (우리의 아픔 그리고 추억)" - Kang Sung Hoon Vol. 2; "Why (왜)" - Hoony 03; "I'm Sorry" - Hoony 03

== Filmography ==
=== Film ===
Year	Title	Role
1998	Seventeen: The Movie	Sang-rok

=== Dramas ===
Year	Title	Character	Notes
2003	Nonstop	Kang Sung Hoon	Special Guest

=== Variety shows ===
Year	Title
2015	Real Theater (리얼극장)
2016	Get it Beauty

== Awards and nominations ==
Year	Award-Giving Body	Category	Work	Result
2002	Mnet Asian Music Awards	Best Dance Performance	"My Girl"	Nominated
2002	SBS Gayo Daejeon	Popularity Award	"My Girl"	Won
2003	KMTV Korean Music Awards	Popularity Award	"아껴둔 이야기"(Precious stories)	Nominated

== See also ==
- Sechs Kies
- Daesung Entertainment
