= 2002 in South Korean music =

The following is a list of notable events and releases that happened in 2002 in music in South Korea.

== Debuting and disbanded in 2002 ==
=== Debuting groups ===
- Black Beat
- F-iV
- Isak N Jiyeon
- JK Kim Dong-wook
- J-Walk
- Leessang
- Loveholics
- LUV
- MC the Max
- Shinvi
- Sugar
- Sweet Sorrow
- Vibe

=== Solo debuts ===
- Byul
- Chae Ri-na
- Chu Ga-yeoul
- MC Sniper
- Rain
- Ra.D
- Shim Mina
- Wheesung

=== Disbanded groups ===
- KISS
- S.E.S
- S#arp
- T.T.Ma

== Releases in 2002 ==
=== January ===
Date	Title	Artist	Genre(s)
1	Ssa2	Psy	K-pop
1	Winter Sonata OST	Various	OST
1	Wild Gangster Hiphop	Hyun Jin-young	Hip hop
3	Bravo My Life	SSAW	Jazz-rock fusion
11	Man	Park Ji-yoon	K-pop

=== February ===
Date	Title	Artist	Genre(s)
14	Choose My Life-U	S.E.S.	K-pop
26	Eun Ji Won 2	Eun Ji-won	K-pop

=== March ===
Date	Title	Artist	Genre(s)
8	Eternity	Fin.K.L	K-pop
13	Tell Me Why	Sugar	K-pop
15	Philip (필립 (必立))	Koyote	Hip hop
16	Black Beat #2002 – The First Performance #001	Black Beat	K-pop
21	Suddenly	J-Walk	K-pop
29	Perfect Man	Shinhwa	K-pop
30	15 to 30	Shinvi	K-pop

=== April ===
Date	Title	Artist	Genre(s)
1	Kang Sung Hoon Vol.2	Kang Sung-hoon	K-pop
4	Change Yourself	The Jadu	Rock
12	Dim the Lights	J	R&B, Soul
14	No. 1	BoA	K-pop
26	C.J.2002	Im Chang-jung	K-pop

=== May ===
Date	Title	Artist	Genre(s)
3	Gemini	Yoon Mi-rae	Hip hop
13	Bad Guy	Rain	K-pop, R&B
15	Story - Orange Girl	Luv	K-pop
16	So Sniper...	MC Sniper	Hip hop

=== June ===
Date	Title	Artist	Genre(s)
10	Summer Vacation in SMTown.com	SMTOWN	K-pop
13	Op.4	Lena Park	Pop ballad

=== July ===
Date	Title	Artist	Genre(s)
4	7even (Truth)	Cool	K-pop
5	Please (부탁해요)	Wax	R&B, Ballad
18	Messiah	Moon Hee-joon	Rock
18	Melodie D'Amour	Sung Si-kyung	Pop ballad
24	Vacation	Can	Hard rock
31	Again	Jewelry	K-pop

=== August ===
Date	Title	Artist	Genre(s)
1	Diet	Kim Hyun-jung	Dance, R&B
13	Made in Korea	Cherry Filter	Rock
21	Pine Tree	Kangta	K-pop, Ballad
29	Vol. 1 Don't Go Away	Chu Ga-yeoul	Folk
31	Light for the People	Na Yoon-sun	Jazz

=== September ===
Date	Title	Artist	Genre(s)
1	Luxury Diva	Diva	K-pop
3	Tell Me Baby	Isak N Jiyeon	K-pop
6	Style	Sharp	K-pop
9	Struggling	Shin Hae-chul	Heavy metal
11	My Stay in Sendai	Lee Soo-young	K-pop
13	Time Honored Voice	Park Hyo-shin	Ballad
18	3 Mai	Psy	K-pop
18	My Name Is Ra.D	Ra.D	R&B, Soul, Hip hop
25	F-IV [faiv]	F-iV	K-pop

=== October ===
Date	Title	Artist	Genre(s)
2	Sweet Dream	Jang Na-ra	K-pop
4	The First Step	Chae Ri-na	K-pop
7	CU @ K-POP	K'Pop	K-pop
8	Album of the (Y)Ear	5tion	K-pop
11	Chakra	Chakra	K-pop
12	Because I Love You	Hwayobi	K-pop, R&B
16	Someday	J-Walk	K-pop, Ballad
17	Dream Pop Song	Onnine Ibalgwan	Rock
22	December 32	Byul	K-pop
24	Why Be Normal?	YG Family	K-pop, Hip hop
28	Liar	Harisu	K-pop
31	M.C The Max!	MC the Max	Rock

=== November ===
Date	Title	Artist	Genre(s)
1	A Walk Around the Corner	Yoo Hee-yeol	Adult contemporary
4	I ♡ Natural	Lee Jung-hyun	K-pop
7	Rendezvous	Shim Mina	Dance pop, R&B
12	New Story II	Lee Ki-chan	R&B
14	Extreme Happiness	UN	R&B
22	Have You Ever Had Heart Broken?	Lyn	K-pop
28	Carolling (Christmas album)	As One	K-pop, R&B

=== December ===
Date	Title	Artist	Genre(s)
3	Chapter 5: Letter	g.o.d	K-pop
3	The Second Whisper	Cool	K-pop
5	To My Love	Yoon Mi-rae	Hip hop
5	The Secondhand Radio	Crying Nut	Punk rock
6	2002 Winter Vacation in SMTown.com – My Angel My Light	SMTOWN	K-pop
16	Love Story	jtL	K-pop
17	I Miss You (보고 싶다)	Kim Bum-soo	K-pop
27	Wedding	Shinhwa	K-pop
27	MC Sniper Limited Edition	MC Sniper	Hip hop

== See also ==
- 2002 in South Korea
- List of South Korean films of 2002
