= Handsome Boys of the 20th Century =

- Genre: Variety; Reality
- Starring: Moon Hee-joon; Tony Ahn; Eun Ji-won; Danny Ahn; Chun Myung-hoon
- Country of origin: South Korea
- Original language: Korean
- No. of seasons: 2
- No. of episodes: 26

Production
- Production location: South Korea
- Camera setup: Multi-camera

Original release
- Network: QTV
- Release: April 16 – November 19, 2013

Handsome Boys of the 20th Century is a South Korean variety-reality show which aired on the cable channel QTV. It began airing on April 16, 2013 and ran for two seasons with a total of 29 episodes.

== Premise and concept ==
The show features five members from four disbanded or inactive "first-generation" K-pop idol groups, which debuted during the 1990s: H.O.T., Sechs Kies, (Note: Sechs Kies reunited in 2016.) NRG and g.o.d. (Note: g.o.d came out of hiatus in 2014 and recommenced group activities.) H.O.T. is acknowledged to be the first ever highly successful K-pop idol group and was largely rivaled by Sechs Kies. NRG was a pioneer of what has now been termed as the Korean Wave (Hallyu; 한류) and were the first Korean idol group to successfully break into the market in China. g.o.d was the first idol group to be dubbed "the nation's group" due to their broad popular appeal and became only the second K-pop idol group to have more than one album sell over a million copies.

Moon Hee-joon, leader of H.O.T., personally invited his H.O.T. bandmate Tony An, Sechs Kies leader and rapper Eun Ji-won, dancer and singer-songwriter Chun Myung-hoon of NRG and rapper Danny Ahn of g.o.d, all of whom were born in the same year (1978) and have remained active in the entertainment industry. They would meet in a rented house where they could have a candid chat about issues and topics that they had not been able to speak about due to the closed and highly taciturn culture of the K-pop industry while they were active as members of their groups. Moon had proposed the concept of the show following the success of the television series Reply 1997 and a renewed interest in first-generation K-pop idol groups.

== Episodes ==
=== Season 1 ===
Episode #	Air Date	Description	Guests	Notes
1	April 16, 2013	Eun Ji-won, Tony An, Chun Myung-hoon and Danny Ahn meet at an empty rented house at the invitation of Moon Hee-joon but have no idea why they are there. They decide to call themselves "HOTSechgodRG".		
2	April 23, 2013	HOTSechgodRG holds an official press conference to promote the show. They discuss their past dance routines and compare choreography.		
3	April 30, 2013	The production team has prepared a "memory room" full of various items and memorabilia. The members of HOTSechgodRG take turns picking an item and reminiscing about the memories associated with their chosen item.		
4	May 7, 2013	HOTSechgodRG unanimously agree to do a music video but have difficulty deciding on a song to cover. They finally decide on NRG's debut song "I Can Do It" (할 수 있어) after learning about the background story behind the song.		
5	May 14, 2013	HOTSechgodRG prepare to record the single and film and choreograph the music video. However, they encounter difficulties along the way as they realize that their bodies are no longer as agile.		
6	May 21, 2013	A long-time fan visits the house with special lunchboxes and tells HOTSechgodRG about how the fans feel about their show. They decide to hold a fan meeting to thank fans for their support.		
7	May 28, 2013	During the fan meeting, HOTSechgodRG perform their own individual solo songs and listen to fans' stories and memories.		
8	June 4, 2013	HOTSechgodRG each invite a friend over for a mini reunion of the first generation groups and update one another about individual activities and endeavors. Note: Continues to the next episode	Kim Jae-duck (Sechs Kies), Noh Yoo-min (NRG), Jang Su-won (Sechs Kies), Lee Jae-won (H.O.T.) and Kim Tae-woo (g.o.d); Episode 9 only: Bada (S.E.S.), Son Ho-young (g.o.d)	
9	June 11, 2013	HOTSechgodRG and their friends decide to play some games and two guests drop by unannounced. While Bada and the H.O.T members prepare dinner, members of the other groups sift through a box of memorabilia and photographs donated by fans.	Kim Jae-duck (Sechs Kies), Noh Yoo-min (NRG), Jang Su-won (Sechs Kies), Lee Jae-won (H.O.T.) and Kim Tae-woo (g.o.d); Episode 9 only: Bada (S.E.S.), Son Ho-young (g.o.d)	
10	June 18, 2013	HOTSechgodRG talk about how they each entered the K-pop industry and the beginnings of their idol groups. Members of Rainbow pay a visit and a discussion ensues as they compare and contrast what it was like to be in an idol group back then and in the present.	Jaekyung, Jisook and Hyunyoung (Rainbow)	
11	June 25, 2013	In a throwback to g.o.d's Baby Diaries, HOTSechgodRG is tasked with caring for a toddler for an entire day.		
12	July 2, 2013	HOTSechgodRG prepare for their performance on Immortal Songs: Singing the Legend.	Hong Kyung-min, 100%, Niel (Teen Top), Park Nam-jung	
13	July 9, 2013	HOTSechgodRG go camping in the backyard and reflect on their performance on Immortal Songs and the success of the music video.		

=== Season 2 ===
Episode #	Air Date	Description	Guests	Notes
14	August 27, 2013	HOTSechgodRG reunite at the press conference to announce the second season and prepare for the promotional photo shoot. They discuss what they think about one another after filming season 1.	Bong Jung-keun	
15	September 3, 2013	HOTSechgodRG decide to get away from the city for a bonding trip but the day begins badly for Tony, who is pranked by the other four members. The members discuss the ups and downs of their lives thus far and their hopes for the future, both professionally and personally. Special guests appear and share their memories of the first-generation groups.	Videos: Shin Dong-yup, Choi Hyuk-jun, Suzy (miss A); Kim Jae-duck	
16	September 10, 2013	HOTSechgodRG decide to get away from the city for a bonding trip but the day begins badly for Tony, who is pranked by the other four members. The members discuss the ups and downs of their lives thus far and their hopes for the future, both professionally and personally. Special guests appear and share their memories of the first-generation groups.		
17	September 17, 2013	As the date for their magazine shoot draws closer, HOTSechgodRG must decide on a theme and what they will be wearing.		
18	September 24, 2013	HOTSechgodRG discuss how age has caught up with them and ways to stay healthy.		
19	October 1, 2013	Excitement builds for HOTSechgodRG as they fly to Guam for a rare holiday. They try out different activities for the first time and compete against one another in a series of Running Man-style missions but impending bad weather threatens to ruin their tropical getaway.		
20	October 8, 2013	Excitement builds for HOTSechgodRG as they fly to Guam for a rare holiday. They try out different activities for the first time and compete against one another in a series of Running Man-style missions but impending bad weather threatens to ruin their tropical getaway.		
21	October 15, 2013	HOTSechgodRG discuss the best and worst of each other's drinking habits. They get a surprise visit from their managers, who spill the beans about what it is like to work with them.		
22	October 22, 2013			
23	October 29, 2013			
24	November 5, 2013	Hip-hop legend Tiger JK visits the set and reminisces with HOTSechgodRG.	Tiger JK, Lee Si-eon	
25	November 12, 2013		Uhm Hyun-kyung	
26	November 19, 2013	HOTSechgodRG discuss their first impressions of one another's group members while they were still active.		

== HOTSechgodRG ==
Upon meeting to film the first episode, the five entertainers decided to name their "group" HOTSechgodRG (핫젝갓알지), which combines all of their idol group names. They released a digital single (a remake of NRG's "You Can Do It") and music video, appeared together on Happy Together and other variety shows and performed on Immortal Songs: Singing the Legend. The single reached #72 on the Gaon Digital Chart. There were plans to hold a concert in December 2013 but with Tony An under investigation for illegal gambling, the four remaining members decided not to continue.

In 2014, Moon Hee-joon, Eun Ji-won, Danny Ahn and Chun Myung-hoon reunited and starred in Where Is My Superhero? (W.I.S.H) which aired on OnStyle. HOTSechgodRG did not make any more appearances after that as Danny Ahn's group g.o.d had just become active again after a nine-year hiatus, while Tony An was banned from television appearances by two major broadcasting stations due to his gambling conviction. The members of the group remain close friends and have occasionally made guest appearances on one another's shows, such as Eun Ji-won's travel show Plan Man.

== Reception and impact ==
The show received considerable attention amongst long-time fans of the four groups and international netizens, especially after the episode of Immortal Songs: Singing the Legend which HOTSechgodRG participated in was broadcast and a subtitled version uploaded on YouTube by KBS World. Reception was generally positive as many long-time observers and fans commented that during the 1990s and early 2000s, members from different groups (especially H.O.T. and Sechs Kies) collaborating for a television show was inconceivable back then due to the highly exclusive nature of the industry and such interactions had been discouraged. According to the AGB Nielsen ratings, the first season had an average rating of 1.974% (a rating above 1% is considered a success for a cable channel in South Korea).

Riding on the increased interest in first-generation groups, DSP Media announced in November 2013 that its "DSP Festival" concert in December would also feature disbanded first-generation groups Sechs Kies and Click-B alongside current artists. Rumors also began circulating that HOTSechgodRG's respective idol groups would be reuniting; g.o.d came out of hiatus in May 2014 while Sechs Kies, pioneering girl group S.E.S. and NRG all reunited between 2016 and 2017.
