= List of South Korean films of 2002 =

A list of films produced in South Korea in 2002:

== Box office ==
The highest-grossing South Korean films released in 2002, by domestic box office admissions, are as follows:

Highest-grossing films released in 2002
Rank	Title	Distributor	Admissions
1	Marrying the Mafia	Cinema Service	5,021,001
2	The Way Home	CJ Entertainment	4,091,000
3	Sex Is Zero	Showbox	4,089,900
4	Jail Breakers	Cinema Service	3,073,919
5	Public Enemy	Cinema Service	2,987,900
6	Wet Dreams	A-Line	2,432,950
7	2009: Lost Memories	CJ Entertainment	2,263,800
8	Phone	Buena Vista International Korea	2,182,915
9	Champion	Media Suits	1,770,000
10	Conduct Zero	Big Blue Film	1,683,533

== Released ==
English/Korean title	Director	Cast	Genre	Notes
2002
2009: Lost Memories	Lee Si-myung	Jang Dong-gun		
A.F.R.I.K.A.	Shin Seung-soo			
Addicted	Park Young-hoon	Lee Byung-hun; Lee Mi-yeon		
Ardor	Byun Young-joo	Yunjin Kim		
Bad Guy	Kim Ki-duk	Cho Jae-hyun		
Bet On My Disco	Kim Dong-won			
A Bizarre Love Triangle	Lee Mu-yeong	Gong Hyo-jin; Jo Eun-ji		
Break Out	Kang Hang-jun	Kim Seung-woo; Cha Seung-won		
Camel(s)	Park Ki-yong			
Champion	Kwak Kyung-taek	Yu Oh-seong		
Chi-hwa-seon	Im Kwon-taek	Choi Min-sik; Ahn Sung-ki		Won the Best Director Award at Cannes
The Coast Guard	Kim Ki-duk	Jang Dong-gun		
Conduct Zero	Joh Keun-shik	Ryoo Seung-bum; Lim Eun-kyung; Gong Hyo-jin		
Emergency Act 19	Kim Tae-gyu	Kim Jang-hoon; Hong Kyung-min; Gong Hyo-jin	Comedy; Satire	Features cameo appearances by a number of K-Pop artists.
H	Lee Jong-hyeok	Ji Jin-hee; Cho Seung-woo; Yum Jung-ah		
Jail Breakers	Kim Sang-jin	Sul Kyung-gu; Cha Seung-won; Song Yun-ah		
Jealousy Is My Middle Name	Park Chan-ok	Park Hae-il; Moon Sung-keun; Bae Jong-ok		
Looking For Bruce Lee	Kang Lone			
Lovers' Concerto	Lee Han	Cha Tae-hyun; Lee Eun-ju; Son Ye-jin		
Make It Big	Cho Ui-seok	Song Seung-heon; Kwon Sang-woo; Lee Beom-soo		
Marriage Is a Crazy Thing	Yoo Ha	Kam Woo-sung; Uhm Jung-hwa		
Marrying the Mafia	Jeong Heung-sun	Jung Joon-ho; Kim Jung-eun; Yoo Dong-geun		
My Beautiful Days	Im Jong-jae	Kim Min-sun		
My Beautiful Girl, Mari	Lee Sung-gang			
No Blood No Tears	Ryoo Seung-wan	Jeon Do-yeon; Lee Hye-young; Jung Jae-young		
No Comment	Park Sang-won; Park Kwang-hyun; Lee Hyeon-jong	Shin Ha-kyun; Jung Jae-young; Ryu Deok-hwan		Three-part omnibus film
Oasis	Lee Chang-dong	Sul Kyung-gu; Moon So-ri		
On the Occasion of Remembering the Turning Gate	Hong Sang-soo	Kim Sang-kyung; Chu Sang-mi		
Over the Rainbow	Ahn Jin-woo	Lee Jung-jae; Jang Jin-young	Romantic comedy Romantic drama	
A Perfect Match	Mo Ji-eun	Shin Eun-kyung; Jung Joon-ho		
Phone	Ahn Byeong-ki	Ha Ji-won; Kim Yoo-mi		
Popee	Kim Ji-hyun			
Public Enemy	Kang Woo-suk	Sul Kyung-gu		
Public Toilet	Fruit Chan	Jang Hyuk		
Resurrection of the Little Match Girl	Jang Sun-woo	Lim Eun-kyung		
Road Movie	Kim In-sik	Seo Lin; Hwang Jung-min; Jung Chan		
The Romantic President	Jeon Man-bae	Ahn Sung-ki; Choi Ji-woo; Im Soo-jung		
Saulabi	Moon Jong-keum			
Saving My Hubby	Hyun Nam-seop	Bae Doona; Kim Tae-woo	Comedy drama	
Sex Is Zero	Yoon Je-kyoon	Im Chang-jung; Ha Ji-won		
Sympathy for Mr. Vengeance	Park Chan-wook	Song Kang-ho; Shin Ha-kyun; Bae Doona	Thriller	
Too Young To Die	Park Jin-pyo			
The Way Home	Lee Jeong-hyang	Kim Eul-boon; Yoo Seung-ho		
Unborn but Forgotten	Im Chang-jae	Lee Eun-ju; Jung Joon-ho		
Wet Dreams	Jung Cho-sin	Lee Beom-soo; Kim Sun-a		
Yesterday	Jeong Yun-soo	Kim Seung-woo; Yunjin Kim; Kim Sun-a		

== See also ==
- 2002 in South Korea
- 2002 in South Korean music
