= Jang Su-won =

South Korean singer

- 장수원
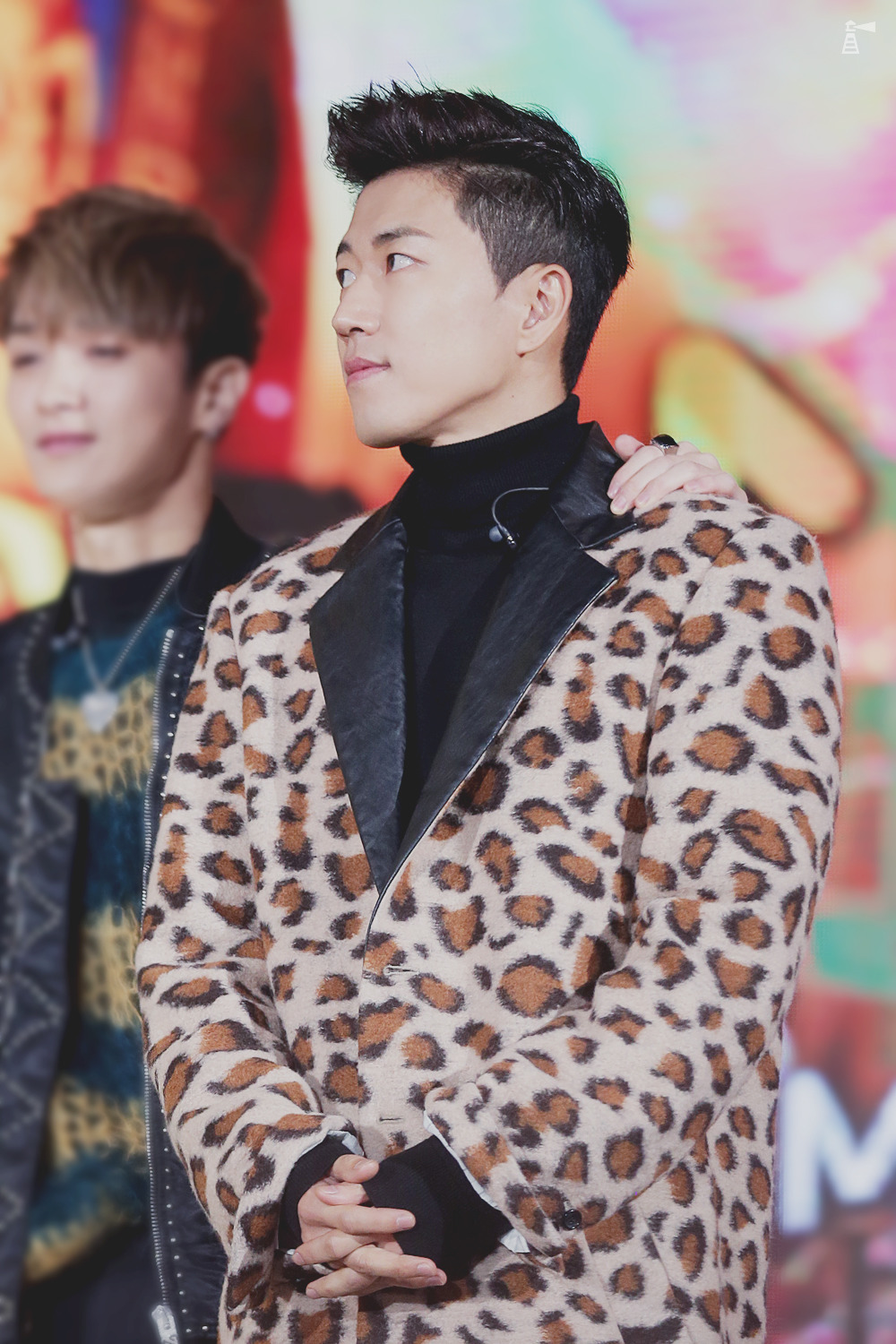
- Jang in November 2016
- Born: July 16, 1980 (age 46); Seocho District, Seoul, South Korea
- Occupation: Singer
- Years active: 1997–present
- Spouse: Ji Sang-eun (m. 2021)
- Children: 1
- Musical career
- Genre: K-pop
- Instrument: Vocals
- Labels: Daesung; JS; A&G; YG
- Member of: Sechs Kies, J-Walk

Korean name
- Hangul: 장수원
- Hanja: 張水院
- RR: Jang Suwon
- MR: Chang Suwŏn

Jang Su-won (Korean: 장수원; born July 16, 1980) is a South Korean singer. He is best known as a member of the South Korean boy group Sechs Kies and the duet group J-Walk, along with fellow Sechs Kies member Kim Jae-duck.

== Career ==
=== SechsKies ===
Jang Su-won followed a friend to try out for DSP audition and got selected. At the interview, he said he was good at nothing and was picked because of this honest answer. It was revealed later that Kang Sung-hun, who had the power of choosing members, chose him for his good looks and positive attitude.

He was in his second year of high school when he debuted as Sechs Kies in 1997. He was known to be the most considerate and the youngest of member of the group. Though he had little parts in the group, he was noted for his ease at singing. Sechs Kies achieved great success and became an icon of the 1990s. However, they suddenly disbanded after promotion of fourth album in May 2000.

=== J-Walk ===
In 2002, Su-won teamed with Kim Jae-duck to form J-Walk under Kiss Entertainment and began to sing more. They released their first album, entitled Suddenly same as hit song in March 2002. "Suddenly" went as high as No. 2 on the music charts. However, their follow up album "Someday" was not as successful. They took SBS Gayo Daejeon Popularity Award with Kang Sung-hun in 2002.

They subsequently collaborated with their former DSP label-mate Click-B to form a project boy group, JnC, under Kiss Entertainment. After releasing their debut project album in 2004, one of Click-B's members left, leaving JnC inactive.

Their first EP Sun Shower(여우비) was delayed until 2007 when they signed with Vitamin Entertainment. J-Walk released their third album My Love in 2008 and Eun Ji-won helped them by participating in the music video and featuring in the title song. Since Kim Jae-duck entered the military shortly after, Su-won had to promote the album by himself. Su-won entered the military in December 2009 and served in Division 15's military band. He was released from the army in October 2011.

After they were discharged from army, J-Walk has signed under A&G Modes and released some digital songs. They returned with mini album "Love...Painfully" with main track "Strive" in December 2013.

=== Robot Actor ===
In September 2013, Su-won starred in the idol edition of "Love and War" but he was criticized for his poor acting, which has been labeled "robot-acting" and "unwatchable". In 2014, people stopped criticizing him because of his nice attitude and good performance on the show Radio Star. Moreover, he regained fame with his imitations of his poor acting at variety shows which led to many offers of CFs (advertisements). Jang Su-won also starred in the drama "Misaengmool", which was a parody version of the popular drama "Misaeng" as the main character Jang Geu Rae. However, people were dissatisfied with his improved acting skills, and even missed his "robot-acting."

=== 2016: Reunite As SechsKies ===
In 2016, SechsKies finally reunited after their disbandment 16 years ago in a famous Korean variety TV show called "Infinite Challenge". They held a pop-up reunion concert on 14 April, the day before the anniversary of SechsKies' debut. After Infinite Challenge aired, Sechs Kies earned many more fans; their hit songs ranked high in music charts and "Couple" was seen in 11th place in Music Bank.

With their growing popularity, YG Entertainment officially announced that they signed a contract with SechsKies except for Ko Ji Yong on May 11. On October 7, SechsKies released a new digital single "Three Words (세 단어)" which topped all 8 major music charts shortly after release, achieving all-kill status. It also ranked high in Asian music charts and global iTunes in Taiwan and is among top tracks on iTunes charts in Hong Kong, Singapore, Malaysia, Thailand and others.

It is revealed that Su-won wanted to get back together the most in the Radio Star and led the way so he enjoys reunion very much. Also, he received more invitation after reunion and joined many different activities and TV shows.

On November 23, YG announced that SechsKies' new album will be released on December 1, 2016. The new album "2016 Re-ALBUM" contains 10 past hit songs of SechsKies that were rearranged and remastered by YG producers, and is prepared a special gift for fans.

SechsKies continued the Yellow Note concert tour on December 10 in Daegu and on December 24–25 in Busan. On October 31, all SechsKies tour concert seats for December were sold out within a few minutes.

On December 16, YG announced SechsKies is to hold a "Yellow Note Final in Seoul" concert on January 21 and 22 at the Jamsil Indoor Stadium. On December 22, all 13,000 tickets were sold out within three minutes.

At the end of the year, SechsKies won several awards including Click! Star Wars Awards Hall of Fame, the 6th Gaon Chart Music Awards The Kpop Contribution of The Year, the 8th Melon Music Awards Hall of Fame, the 31st Golden Disc Awards Best Male Group Performance and the 26th Seoul Music Awards Bonsang.

=== 2017: The 20th Anniversary ===
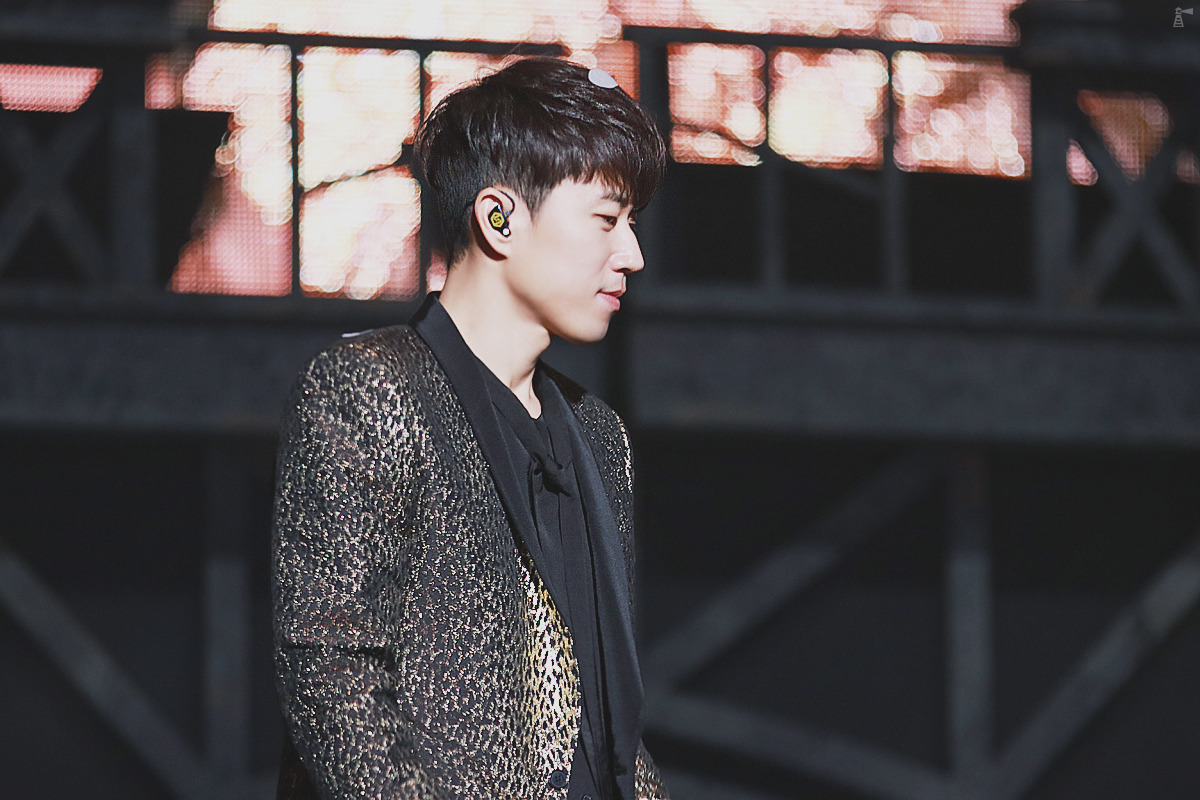
170122 Jang Su-won at Yellow Note Concert

On April 19, YG announced that SechsKies' new album "The 20th Anniversary" will be released on April 28, 2017. Along with the release of the album, two title tracks will be promoted are "Sad Song" and "Be Well". The album topped the charts in Hong Kong, Malaysia, Taiwan, Philippines, Singapore, Thailand, Vietnam, Indonesia, Australia and United States. SECHSKIES's album also topped Mnet, Bugs, Genie and Naver Chart. All the songs in the album made it to the top 100 on the Melon chart, which is remarkable and shows that SECHSKIES has a wide fan base. SechsKies album topped Gaon Chart and Hanteo real time chart, daily chart and weekly chart. "Be Well" also topped Gaon Digital Chart, Download Chart, BGM Chart and Mobile Chart for the 1st week of May. SechsKies held consecutive wins for the title track "Be Well" on MBC Music Core in May. They also won for the #1 spot on KBS Music Bank.

On May 4, SechsKies held their first fansign event after 18 years at Time Square located in Yeongdeungpo District, Seoul. The venue was filled with more than 3,000 fans gathered to see them.

On May 12, YG announced that SechsKies' will debuting in Japan after 20 years debut in Korea. SechsKies' album "The 20th Anniversary" Japan Edition will be released on July 19. YG announced SechsKies' will held their first Japan Fan Meeting at the Yokohama Bay Hall in Kanagawa on July 23 and at the Namba Hatch in Osaka on September 3.

On June 9, YG announced SechsKies' will held their first Korea Fan Meeting since their reunion at the SK Olympic Handball Gymnasium in Seoul on July 15. On June 26, all tickets were sold out within one minutes.

On August 7, YG announced SechsKies is to hold "20th Anniversary Concert" on September 23 at the Gocheok Sky Dome. On August 22, all tickets were sold out within a few minutes.

== After collaboration ==
Su-won opened his own clothing line in the United States and provided uniforms for JYJ Kim Junsu's Hotel. He also has opened a Singapore restaurant, "Yummy Kampong," in Dongdaemun.

== Personal life ==
On June 12, 2021, Jang's agency announced that he and his non-celebrity girlfriend were planning their wedding. and the wedding was held on November 14, 2021, in a private ceremony. On March 21, 2024, Jang's wife announced that she was pregnant with the couple's first child. The couple's first child, a daughter, was born on September 9, 2024.

== Discography ==
=== J-Walk ===
- Suddenly (2002)
- Someday (2002)
- Sun Shower (여우비)(EP) (2007)
- My Love(2008)
- Frappuccino (EP) (2013)
- Love...Painfully (EP) (2013)

=== JnC ===
- The New History Begins (J-Walk & Click-B Project Album), (2004)

=== Others ===
- 1990s with Joon Park, Lee Ji-hye, EXID's Hyerin (Digital single from The Event King Of The Month), (2016)

== Music credits ==
Artist(s)	Song Information
SECHSKIES	"Missing You" - Com` Back; "Pain" - Live Concert
J-Walk	"I'll Love You In This Way (이대로 사랑할께요)" - Suddenly
Kang Sung-hun	"During Past Year... (지난 1년 동안은...) (Feat. Lee Jai-jin, Jang Su-won, Kim Jae-duck, Ko Ji-yong)" - Fly (비상(飛翔)

== Filmography ==
=== Film ===
Year	Title	Role
1998	Seventeen: The Movie	
2005	Baribari Zzang	
2015	Sweet Temptation	Suwon

=== Variety Shows ===
Year	Network	Title	Notes
2014	QTV	Wardrobe Fairy	
2015	SBS	Law of the Jungle	Episode 154 – 162
2015	MBC	Spot!Tasty Food	
2015	tvN	Actor School	
2015	DongA TV	To You	
2015	tvN	Lets Go! Time Exploration Season 3	
2015	K Star	Reform Show	
2015	Channel A	Now On My Way to Meet You	
2015	MBN	Beyond Imagination Show – Real? Fake!	
2015	JTBC	Event King	
2015	SKB	Oksuri 5 Brothers	
2017	NaverTV	Plan Man: New Beginning	
2015, 2016, 2017	SBS	Running Man	Ep. #243, 326, 383 - guest

== Endorsement ==
Year	Company Name	Item	Co-star
1997	Mr Hammer	Snack	Sechs Kies
1998	Elite	Uniform	Sechs Kies
2014	LG U+	cellular carrier	
2014	Kunlun	Mobile application	
2014	LG Chem	chemicals	
2015	Nongshim	Snack	Kim Ye-won
2015	Spopad	EMS exercise machines	
2016	Body and balance hospital	Medicine Service	
2016	ECLADO	cosmetic	
