= Ryu Si-won =

South Korean singer and actor

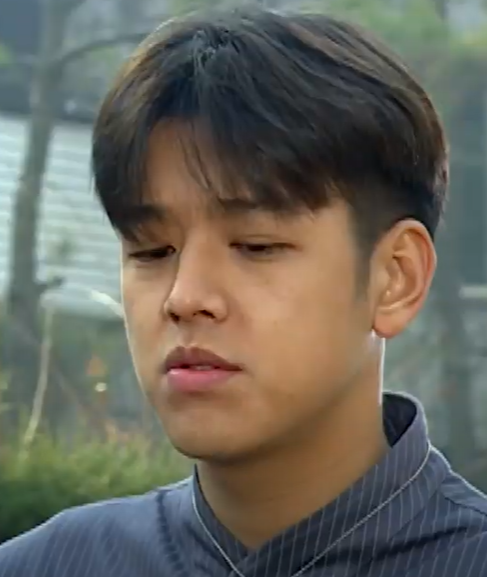
- Ryu in 2000
- Born: 6 October 1972 (age 54); Andong, North Gyeongsang, South Korea
- Occupations: Actor; singer; photographer
- Agents: RS Company; Irving
- Spouses: Jo Su-in (m. 2010; div. 2015); Unknown (m. 2020)
- Children: 2

Korean name
- Hangul: 류시원
- Hanja: 柳時元
- RR: Ryu Siwon
- MR: Ryu Siwŏn

Ryu Si-won (Korean: 류시원; Hanja: 柳時元; born 6 October 1972) is a South Korean actor and singer. After he made his debut in the KBS drama Feeling in 1994, Ryu pursued a singing career.

== Early life ==
Ryu was born in Andong, North Gyeongsang Province, South Korea. He is from the Pungsan Ryu clan and is the 13th-generation descendant of Joseon Dynasty prime minister Ryu Sŏngnyong.

== Career ==
Ryu's acting career began in 1994 with a supporting role in the TV series Feelings, as a friend of one of the main characters. Kim Hyeong-seok, the show's music director, recommended Ryu to the show's producer, Yoon Seok-ho, and Yoon cast Ryu right after seeing Ryu's audition. While Feelings was airing, he was cast as a leading role in the series Blue Sky, which aired in 1995. He gained further popularity with his roles in the daily drama Until We Can Love and the miniseries Propose, Forever Yours, and Purity. During this period, he also debuted as a musician, and hosted programs such as SBS's TV Gayo 20 (the predecessor to Inkigayo) and KBS's Music Bank.

Subsequent to the 2004 broadcast of his drama Beautiful Days in Japan, he started activities there both as an actor and a singer. He was the first Korean artist to hold two live concerts at the Tokyo Dome, in December 2008. Then in November 2011, he held his 100th solo concert in Japan as part of his 16 concert tour in eight cities, including Yokohama, Nigata, Osaka, Sendai, Nagoya, and Fukuoka; with the final concert on 21 December at Saitama Super Arena.

On 21 December 2011, Ryu was signed on by Japanese travel agency HIS, for one-year to promotion Korean tourism in Japan. Where he was featured in two 15-second commercials in the themes of "Let's go to Korea" and "You are the character of your drama" for Japanese television in January 2012.

In May 2012, Ryu starred in Channel A's drama Goodbye Dear Wife along with Hong Soo-hyun, Park Ji-yoon, Danny Ahn and Julien Kang. He played the role of judo teacher Cha Seung-hyuk who dreams of reuniting with his first love.

== Personal life ==
On 6 October 2010, Ryu announced his marriage to a non-celebrity on his fan club's website. He officially married on October 26, with celebrities such as Eugene, Kang Ho-dong, and Kim Won-jun attending. Their first child was born on 28 January 2011, 3 months after their marriage. Ryu's wife filed for divorce on 22 March 2012. Ryu's wife filed another suit on blackmail charges in February 2013, as well as accusing Ryu of threatening her. In May 2013, Ryu was indicted for secretly tracking his wife with a GPS device and using violence on her when she found out. The court ordered him to pay 7 million won for the charges in September, but he appealed the decision. The appeal was rejected, and in 2014, the Supreme Court maintained its original ruling, in accord with a lesser court's decision. Ryu counter-sued his wife for perjury, and she was fined in 2015. The divorce lawsuit officially ended in January 2015.

Ryu remarried on 15 February 2020 to a non-celebrity. Their daughter was born on 11 December 2024.

== Filmography ==
=== Television series ===
| Year | Title | Role | Notes | Ref. |
|---|---|---|---|---|
| 1994 | Feelings | Kang Dong-wook | | |
| 1995 | The Campus Love Song | | | |
| 1995 | Blue Sky | Kang Gi-hun | | |
| 1996 | Oxtail Soup | Jeong In-seong | Seollal special | |
| 1996 | Until We Can Love | Oh Yeong-chang | | |
| 1997 | Happiness is in Our Hearts | Nam Min-woo | | |
| 1997 | Propose | Jeong Su-bin | | |
| 1997 | How To Meet The Perfect Man | Lee Hyuk | | |
| 1998 | Forever Yours | Lee Se-jun | | |
| 1998 | Purity | Ha Jin-woo | | |
| 1998 | Paper Crane | Jeong Eun-hak | | |
| 2000 | Truth | Jung Hyun-woo | | |
| 2000 | Secret | Kim Jun-ho | | |
| 2001 | Beautiful Days | Lee Sun-jae | | |
| 2002 | The Shining Sunlight | Kang Dong-seok | | |
| 2002 | Since We Met | Jo Ki-won | | |
| 2003 | She's Cool! | Mikael | | |
| 2005 | Wedding | Han Seung-woo | | |
| 2005 | From Love | Sang-min | Omnibus series | |
| 2007 | Dondo Hare | Junseo | Episode 25–30, 54, 150, 152 | |
| 2007 | Joshideka! | Park Ji-won | | |
| 2009 | Style | Seo Woo-jin | | |
| 2010 | Hancho | Park Se-joon | Cameo | |
| 2012 | Goodbye Dear Wife | Cha Seung-hyuk | | |
| 2020 | Soul Mechanic | Song Min-soo | Special appearance | |

== Discography ==
=== Studio albums ===
| Title | Album details | Peak chart positions | Sales | Certifications |
| Title | Album details | JPN | Sales | Certifications |
|---|---|---|---|---|
| Change | Released: October 1995 (KOR); Label: Twinkle | — | | |
| Dream (몽; 夢) | Released: 21 September 1999 (KOR); Rereleased: 13 April 2005 (JPN); Label: Twinkle, P-Vine | 35 | KOR: 37,794 | |
| Yakusoku (約束) | Released: 1 December 2004 (JPN); Label: Sony (AICL-1595) | 8 | JPN: 123,000 | |
| Kosumosu (秋桜) | Released: 5 October 2005 (JPN); Label: Tokuma (TKCA-72915) | 4 | JPN: 89,000 | RIAJ: Gold |
| Asian Blow | Released: 10 May 2006 (JPN); Label: Tokuma (TKCA-73020) | 3 | JPN: 63,000 | RIAJ: Gold |
| With You | Released: 23 May 2007 (JPN); Label: Tokuma (TKCA-73190) | 3 | JPN: 42,000 | |
| Sōten no Ai (蒼天の愛) | Released: 4 June 2008 (JPN); Label: Tokuma (TKCA-73331) | 7 | JPN: 36,000 | |
| Mangekyō (万華鏡) | Released: 4 November 2009 (JPN); Label: Tokuma (TKCA-73485) | 5 | JPN: 26,000 | |
| ~ULALA~ (麗～ULALA～) | Released: 7 April 2010 (JPN); Label: Tokuma (TKCA-73517) | 5 | JPN: 25,000 | |
| Donnatokimo (どんな時も) | Released: 5 October 2011 (JPN); Label: Avex Trax (AVCD-38388) | 11 | JPN: 25,000 | |
| Season | Released: 21 November 2012 (JPN); Label: Avex Trax (AVCD-38588) | 20 | | |
| Again | Released: 6 October 2015 (JPN); Label: Universal (UICV-9133) | 8 | | |
| Wish | Released: 5 October 2016 (JPN); Label: Universal (UICV-9210) | 18 | | |

=== Compilation albums ===
| Title | Album details | Peak chart positions | Sales | Certifications |
| Title | Album details | JPN | Sales | Certifications |
|---|---|---|---|---|
| Ryu Siwon Ballad Best Album | Released: 19 November 2008 (JPN); Label: Tokuma (TKCA-73378) | 11 | JPN: 25,000 | |
| Ryu Siwon Single Collection | Released: 22 April 2009 (JPN); Label: Tokuma (TKCA-73423) | 6 | JPN: 21,000 | |
| Ryu Siwon's Racing Diary OST (リュ・シウォンのレーシングダイアリー公式OST) | Released: 22 May 2009 (JPN); Label: E-Motion (EMOC-01) | 27 | JPN: 4,800 | |

=== Singles ===
| Title | Year | Peak chart positions | | Sales | Album |
| Title | Year | JPN | JPN Hot | Sales | Album |
|---|---|---|---|---|---|
| "Sakura" (桜) | 2005 | 2 | — | JPN: 139,000 | Kosumosu |
| "Himawari no Rhapsody" (ひまわりのRhapsody) | 2005 | 5 | — | JPN: 78,000 | Kosumosu |
| "Natsu no Yume/Suki Desu, Suki Desu" (夏の夢/好きです、好きです) | 2006 | 2 | — | JPN: 63,000 | Asian Blow |
| "Only One" | 2006 | 3 | — | JPN: 43,000 | Non-album singles |
| "Babylon" | 2007 | 4 | — | JPN: 39,000 | Non-album singles |
| "Hana no Kubikazari" (花の首飾り) | 2007 | 2 | — | JPN: 50,000 | Sōten no Ai |
| "Aishiteru" (愛してる) | 2008 | 5 | 18 | JPN: 37,000 | Sōten no Ai |
| "Kimi to Boku" (君と僕) | 2008 | 4 | 18 | JPN: 32,000 | Ryu Siwon Single Collection |
| "Cafe Wonderland" | 2009 | 9 | 28 | JPN: 26,000 | Mangekyō |
| "Memu" (女夢-Memu-) | 2009 | 5 | 44 | JPN: 22,000 | Mangekyō |
| "Aishitai Kimi o Aishitiai" (愛したい 君を 愛したい) | 2011 | 7 | 59 | JPN: 14,000 | Donnatokimo |
| "Negaiboshi" (願い星) | 2011 | 14 | 70 | | Donnatokimo |
| "Bokura no Deatta Sono Basho ni..." (僕らが出会ったその場所に…) | 2012 | 13 | 61 | | Season |

== Awards ==
- 1996 KBS Drama Awards: Best New Actor
- 1997 KBS Drama Awards: Popularity Award
- 1998 KBS Drama Awards: Popularity Award
- 1998 KBS Drama Awards: Excellence Award, actor
- 1999 16th Korea Best Dressed Awards: Recipient
- 1999 35th Baeksang Arts Awards: Most Popular Actor in TV (Paper Crane)
- 2000 MBC Drama Awards: Excellence Award, Actor (Truth)
- 2001 SBS Drama Awards: Top 10 Stars (Beautiful Days)
- 2002 MBC Drama Awards: Excellence Award, Actor
- 2005 47th Japan Record Awards: Most Popular Artist
- 2005 19th Japan Gold Disc Awards: Best New Artist Award
- 2007 SBS Entertainment Awards: Special Award
- 2007 Korea Model Awards: Hallyu Star Award
- 2008 Presidential Citation
