= Emergency Act 19 =

- Theatrical poster
- Hangul: 긴급조치 19호
- Hanja: 緊急措置 19號
- RR: Gingeupjochi 19ho
- MR: Kin'gŭpchoch'i 19ho
- Directed by: Kim Tae-gyu
- Written by: Kim Sung-dong; Lee Seung-guk
- Produced by: Song Chang-yong
- Starring: Kim Jang-hoon; Hong Kyung-min; Gong Hyo-jin; Roh Joo-hyun
- Cinematography: Hwang Seo-shik
- Edited by: Park Soon-duk
- Music by: Seok Seong-won; Ju Yeong-hun
- Distributed by: SS1 Cinema
- Release date: July 19, 2002
- Running time: 107 minutes
- Country: South Korea
- Language: Korean

Emergency Act 19 (Korean: 긴급조치 19호) is a satirical 2002 South Korean film about a government act that prohibits popular music, passed in response to a number of musicians being elected to government elsewhere in the world. It is notable for the numerous K-pop stars that make appearances in the film. The film's English title is sometimes given as Emergency Measure 19 or Emergency 19.

== Plot ==
Troubled by the growing worldwide trend of pop singers being elected as politicians, the President of South Korea orders his Chief Secretary to invoke "Emergency Act 19". This new law criminalizes all pop singers, and the army is deployed on the streets of Seoul to round them up. One pop star, Hong Kyung-min, is arrested while performing a concert, but his angry fans mob the soldiers as they try to take him away. The Chief Secretary's teenage daughter, Min-ji, is amongst the fans, and leading her idol to safety gives him her phone number. Kyung-min finally makes a getaway with his friend and fellow pop star, Kim Jang-hoon.

Once Jang-hoon and Kyung-min become fully aware of the situation, they contact Min-ji who is able to hide the two singers in a secret location. The Chief Secretary finds out that his daughter is working against him, and when she refuses to give them up he has false news reports created, accusing the singers of sexually assaulting minors. Meanwhile, more pop stars are rounded up by the authorities who are now aided by another singer, Ju Yeong-hun, who decides to betray his friends in order to save himself.

Angered by their tarnished reputations, Jang-hoon and Kyung-min acquire a gun from a shady weapons dealer, and with Min-ji's help they are able to take the Chief Secretary and his staff hostage. They take their captives to the park, where Min-ji has organized a mass demonstration with her friends and other music fans. The army arrive on the scene and engage the demonstrators in conflict, finally capturing Jang-hoon and Kyung-min. The Chief Secretary is able to walk free in all the chaos, but he is appalled by the violence and orders the fighting to stop, convincing the President to repeal the emergency act and restoring peace.

== Cast ==
- Kim Jang-hoon as himself
- Hong Kyung-min as himself
- Gong Hyo-jin as Min-ji
- Roh Joo-hyun as the Chief Secretary and Min-ji's father
- Ju Yeong-hun as himself

=== List of cameos ===
Besides the main cast, there are a number of actors and K-pop singers and groups who make cameos in the film as themselves. They are:

- Kim Sung-oh as soldier 2 at vinyl house
- Baby V.O.X.
- Brown Eyes
- Can
- Chakra
- Click-B
- Fin.K.L
- Harisu
- Kangta
- Koyote
- NRG
- Shinhwa
- UN
- Psy

== Release ==
Emergency Act 19 was released in South Korea on July 19, 2002, and received a total of 41,034 admissions in Seoul.
