= Kim Jae-duck =

South Korean singer (born 1979)

- 김재덕
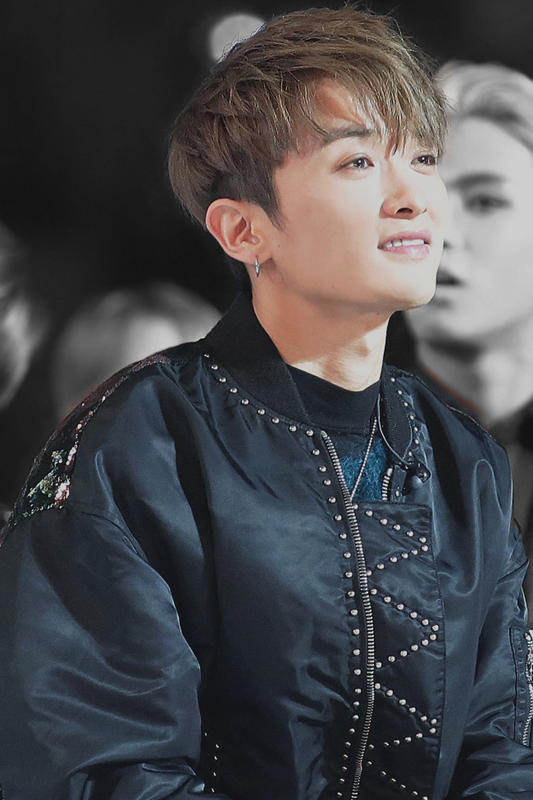
- Kim in November 2016
- Born: August 7, 1979 (age 47); Busan, South Korea
- Occupations: Singer; rapper; choreographer
- Years active: 1997–present
- Musical career
- Genre: K-pop
- Instrument: Vocals
- Labels: Daesung; TN Nation
- Member of: Sechs Kies; J-Walk

Korean name
- Hangul: 김재덕
- Hanja: 金在德
- RR: Gim Jaedeok
- MR: Kim Chaedŏk

Kim Jae-duck (Korean: 김재덕; born August 7, 1979) is a South Korean singer, rapper, and choreographer. He is known as a member of the South Korean boy group Sechs Kies and the duo J-Walk with Jang Suwon, also from Sechs Kies. Kim is known for his Busan accent and his nickname is "Ducky" as a reference to his name.

== Career ==
=== Early years and formation of Sechs Kies ===
Kim and fellow Busan native Lee Jai-jin formed a dance crew called Quicksilver, and was selected as a trainee in Lee Juno's company. Lee Juno was famous as Seo Taiji and Boys' member. At that time Lee Ho yeon, Daesung Entertainment's CEO, asked him to recommend an idol group member. That is how he became a Sechs Kies's member. In 2016, Kang Sung-hoon said that he had watched the audition tape and chosen Kim as a member for his superior dancing skill. The duo moved to Seoul to finish high school while training at Daesung Entertainment.

=== 1997–2000: Sechs Kies ===
SechsKies made their debut in April 1997 and quickly came to be seen as a rival of H.O.T, who had debuted a year earlier and were considered the first K-pop idol group to achieve mainstream recognition and success. Kim and Lee, who were the main dancers and choreographers, were largely responsible for some of the group's most memorable dances. Kim was not given many singing parts and was instead known for rapping in the Busan dialect. SechsKies went on to establish themselves as one of the most popular boy bands of the late 1990s, scoring a string of #1 hits on music programs. However they suddenly disbanded in 2000 and performed for the final time at the Dream Concert that May at the Seoul Olympic Stadium.

=== 2000–2015: J-Walk and other solo activities ===
After Sechs Kies disbanded 2000 when the members announced they wanted to split ways, Kim was set to become a dance instructor for Sechs Kies label Daesung Entertainment but he ended up joining with his former Sechs Kies member Jang Su-won to form a new duo J-Walk in 2002 under a new label, Kiss Entertainment.

They released their first album, entitled Suddenly in March 2002, and the title track, Suddenly, became a huge hit. They released second album Someday at the same year. Both two albums were well received and acclaimed and they took SBS Gayo Daejeon Popularity Award with former Sechs Kies member Kang Sung-hun in 2002.

Their first EP Sun Shower (여우비) was delayed until 2007 when they signed with Vitamin Entertainment. J-Walk released their third album My Love in 2008 and Eun Ji-won helped them by participating in the music video and featuring in the title song. Since Kim entered the military shortly after, Jang had to promote the album by himself.

After Jang was discharged from army, J-Walk has signed under A&G Modes and released some digital songs. They returned with mini album Love...Painfully with main track "Strive" in December 2013.

=== 2016–present: Sechs Kies reunion ===
In 2016, Kim reunited with his former bandmates through the variety show Infinite Challenge. There had already been prior speculation about a reunion as Kim himself, leader Eun Ji-won and vocalist Jang Su-won had cautiously hinted that all members were in discussions except vocalist Ko Ji-yong, who had completely left the entertainment industry to start his own business and was already married. During the "Totoga" segment of Infinite Challenge, the five members organized a guerrilla concert, the first time they had stood together on stage as Sechs Kies in over fifteen years. Ko made a surprise appearance backstage to reunite with the five members and during the concert for an emotional rendition of their award-winning hit "Couple". Sechs Kies (except Ko Ji-yong) signed with YG Entertainment for all group activities while Kim and other members remained with their individual management agencies. It was decided that they would promote as a group and temporarily postponed solo activities.

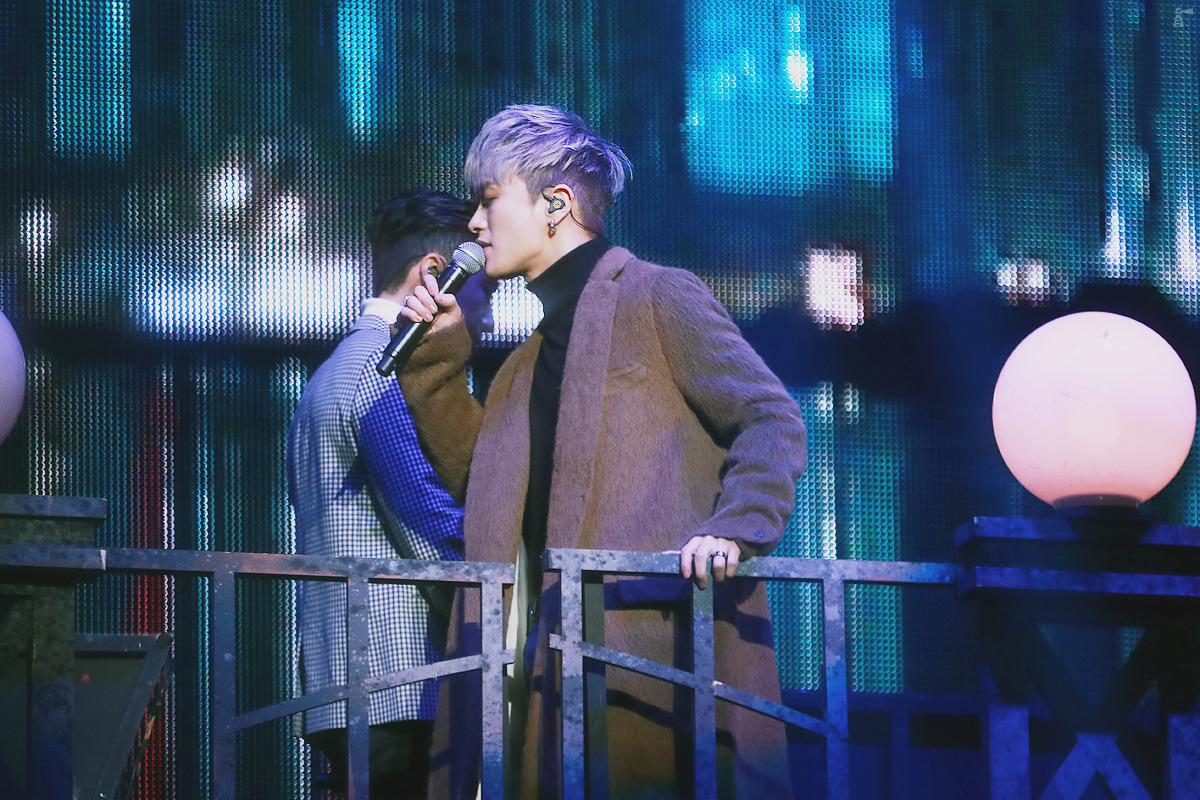
170122 Kim at Yellow Note Concert

Outside of Sechs Kies, Kim has appeared on several variety shows, usually with his friend Tony An. He co-hosted the restaurant touring show Delicious Man' with An. He also appeared on My Little Old Boy, a reality show that An was participating in.

== Personal life ==
Kim is currently housemates with former H.O.T. member Tony An. The arrangement had caused a stir amongst their contemporaries as both groups were regarded as one another's fiercest industry rivals during the late 1990s and largely avoided any contact with one another despite crossing paths many times. They had met and befriended one another during their mandatory military service. In 2014, Kim became a director of the entertainment agency which Tony An founded, TN Nation Entertainment.

== Discography ==
=== In J-Walk ===
- Suddenly (2002)
- Someday (2002)
- 여우비/Sunshower (EP) (2007)
- My Love (2008)
- Frappuccino (EP) (2013)
- Love...Painfully (EP) (2013)

== Music credits ==
Artist(s)	Song Information
Sechs Kies	"A+" - Com` Back; "Silence" - Live Concert
J-Walk	"The Very First and Last Love of Mine (사랑이자 마지막 사랑)" - Suddenly; "Saying I Don’t Miss You Is A Lie (니가 그립지 않다는 거짓말로)" - Someday; "Goodbye Memories (추억...안녕)" - My Love
Kang Sung-hun	"During Past Year... (지난 1년 동안은...) (Feat. Lee Jai-jin, Jang Su-won, Kim Jae-duck, Ko Ji-yong)" - Fly (비상(飛翔)

== Filmography ==
=== Film ===
Year	Title	Role
1998	Seventeen: The Movie	Jong-soo

=== Variety shows ===
Year	Title	Episode(s)
2010	Happy Together	173
2011	Hello Counselor	16
2012-2013	Delicious World	30-34 (New Caledonia)
2012-2013	Delicious World	74-78 (Western Australia)
2012-2013	Delicious World	113-117 (Malaysia)
2012-2013	Delicious World	138-152 (Seychelles)
2013	Radio Star	318, 319
2013	Mr King of Household Duties	
2015	Infinite Challenge	403
2015	Radio Star	420
2016	Delicious Man	All episodes - Host along with Tony An
2016	Man Who Feed the Dogs	24
2016	Abnormal Summit	102
2016	Get It Beauty	8
2016	Happy Together	455
2016	Battle Trip	13
2016	Laundry Day	2
2016	My Little Old Boy	4, 6, 8, 9, 11, 18, 22, 24, 26 - 28, 30, 33, 37, 39, 41, 43, 49, 51
2017	The Last 48 Hours of My Life	7
2017	Please Take Care of My Refrigerator	152, 153

== See also ==
- Sechs Kies
- K-pop
- Korean music
- Daesung Entertainment
