= Plan Man =

- Genre: Travel, Reality
- Starring: Eun Ji-won
- Country of origin: South Korea
- Original language: Korean
- No. of seasons: 2
- No. of episodes: 10

Production
- Production location: South Korea
- Camera setup: Multi-camera

Original release
- Network: tagTV; TRENDY; Naver TV
- Release: May 22 – August 14, 2016

Plan Man (Korean: 플랜맨) is a South Korean travel-reality show. Hosted by Eun Ji-won, the concept revolves around Eun acting as a travel agent and planning a trip for the celebrity participants.

== Season 1 ==
Episode #	Air Date	Participants	Destination	Notes
1	May 22, 2016	Park Na-rae, Kim Ji-min, Park So-young	Guam	
2	May 29, 2016	Park Na-rae, Kim Ji-min, Park So-young	Guam	
3	June 5, 2016	Park Na-rae, Kim Ji-min, Park So-young	Guam	
4	June 12, 2016	Brian Joo (Fly to the Sky), Tony An (H.O.T.)	Shenzhen, China	
5	June 19, 2016	Brian Joo (Fly to the Sky), Tony An (H.O.T.)	Shenzhen, China	
6	June 26, 2016	Brian Joo (Fly to the Sky), Tony An (H.O.T.)	Shenzhen, China	
7	July 10, 2016	JeA (Brown Eyed Girls), Yoon Chae-kyung (April), Hwang In-seon	Phuket Island, Thailand	
8	July 17, 2016	JeA (Brown Eyed Girls), Yoon Chae-kyung (April), Hwang In-seon	Phuket Island, Thailand	
9	July 24, 2016	JeA (Brown Eyed Girls), Yoon Chae-kyung (April), Hwang In-seon	Phuket Island, Thailand	
10	July 31, 2016	HOTSechgodRG (Tony An, Danny Ahn and Chun Myung-hoon)	Jeju Island	
11	August 7, 2016	HOTSechgodRG (Tony An, Danny Ahn and Chun Myung-hoon)	Jeju Island	
12	August 14, 2016	HOTSechgodRG (Tony An, Danny Ahn and Chun Myung-hoon)	Jeju Island	

== Season 2 ==
=== New Beginning ===
- Serri (Dal Shabet)
- Woohee (Dal Shabet)
- Subin (Dal Shabet)

=== Black & White ===
- Jang Su-won (SECHSKIES)

=== Hokkaido, Japan ===
- Jang Su-won (SECHSKIES)
- Subin (Dal Shabet)
