= Goodbye Dear Wife =

2012 South Korean TV series

- Promotional poster
- Genre: Romance; Drama
- Written by: Kim Pyung-joong
- Directed by: Kim Do-hyun
- Starring: Ryu Si-won; Hong Soo-hyun; Park Ji-yoon; Danny Ahn; Julien Kang
- Country of origin: South Korea
- Original language: Korean

Production
- Executive producer: Jo Sung-won
- Producer: Yoon Young-ha
- Production company: Verdi Media

Original release
- Network: Channel A
- Release: 7 May – 10 July 2012

Goodbye Dear Wife (Korean: 굿바이 마눌) is a 2012 South Korean television series, starring Ryu Si-won, Hong Soo-hyun and Park Ji-yoon. It aired on Channel A from May 7 to July 10, 2012 at 20:50 for 20 episodes.

== Plot ==
The series is about a judo teacher, Cha Seung-hyuk (Ryu Si-won), who is married to Kang Sun-ah (Hong Soo-hyun), who wanted to be a nun. He dreams of reuniting with his first love, Oh Hyang-gi (Park Ji-yoon), a cold-hearted woman.

== Cast ==
- Ryu Si-won as Cha Seung-hyuk
- Hong Soo-hyun as Kang Sun-ah - Seung-hyuk's wife who was raised by nuns
- Park Ji-yoon as Oh Hyang-gi - Seung-Hyuk's first love
- Julien Kang as Kang Gu-ra - rival fighter to Seung-hyuk
- Danny Ahn as Gye Dong-hee - Seung-hyuk's friend
- Kim Min-soo as Kim Hyun-chul
- Oh Joo-eun as Joo Ji-ae
- Lee Yun-kyung as Lee Hae-shim
- Jung Sung-mo as So Yong-dae
- Oh Mi-hee as Lee Ok-boon
- Lee Byung-joon as Gong Shin-boo
- Yoon Sung-min as Sung-min
- Jo Hye-soo as Oh Hyang-eun

== Original soundtracks ==
No.	Title	Artist	Length
1.	"죽어도 넌 내 사랑" (I would die for you my love)	Misty (미스티) (feat. Danny Ahn (데니안))	4:02
2.	"광택" (Shine)	Hwang Wook	3:04
3.	"굿바이" (Goodbye)	Ryu Si Won	4:43
4.	"너는 마지막 사랑" (You are the last love)	BJ SOUL	4:26
5.	"다 지워버리면" (If you erase everything)	Park Ji-yoon	4:41
6.	"악담" (Curse)	Kim Jo Han	3:34
7.	"너 언제든지" (Whenever you go)	Ryu Si Won	4:07

== Reception ==
According to AGB Nielsen Media Research, the premiere episode achieved a nationwide rating of 0.84 percent in viewership.
