= Julien Kang =

Actor and model based in South Korea (born 1982)

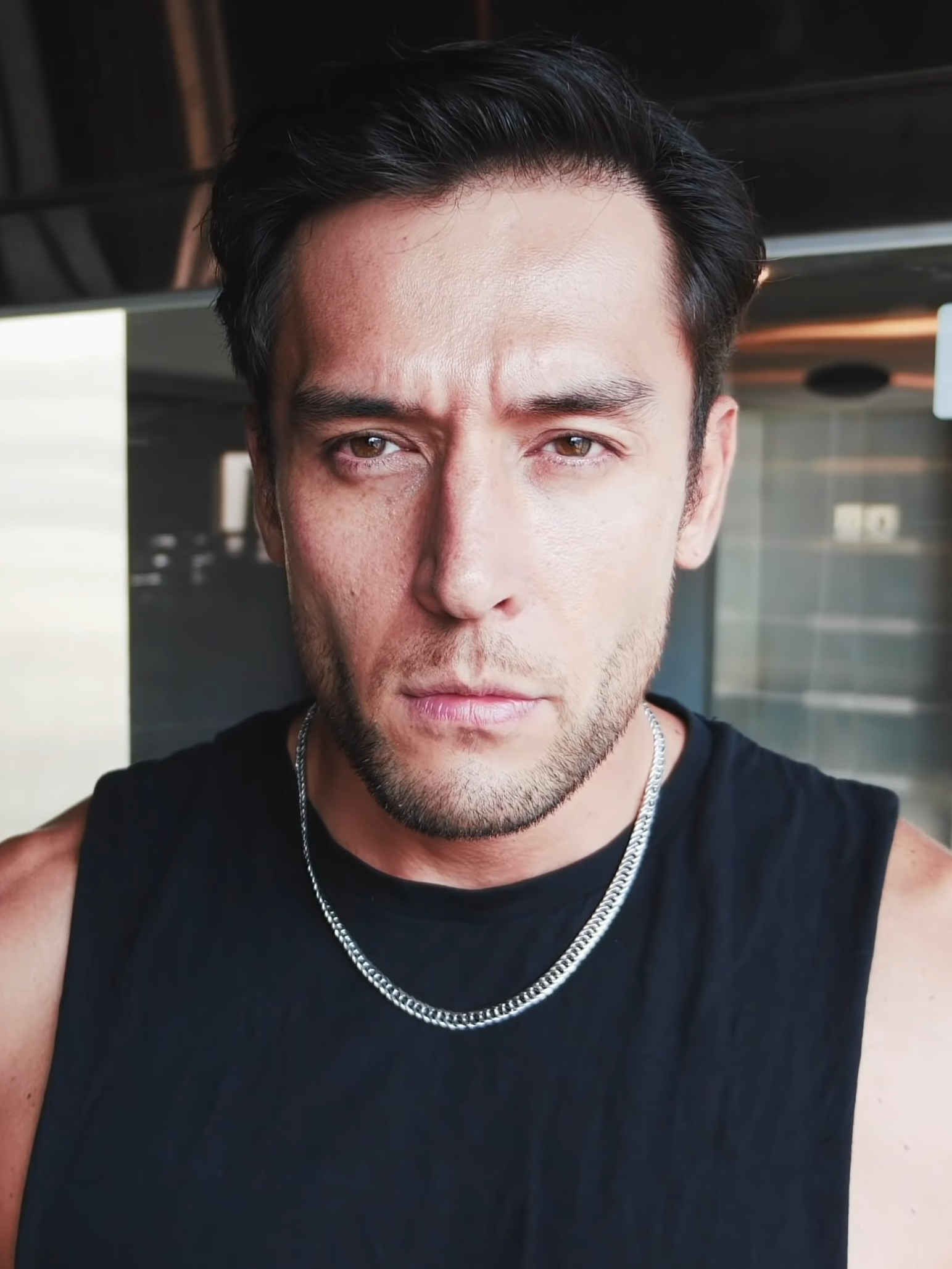
- Kang in 2019
- Born: 11 April 1982 (age 44); Saint Pierre and Miquelon, France
- Occupations: Actor; model
- Years active: 2008–present
- Agent(s): Jellyfish Entertainment (2015–2017)
- Spouse: JJ (m. 2024)
- Relatives: Denis Kang; (brother)

Julien Kang (Korean: 줄리엔 강; born 11 April 1982) is a Canadian and French actor and model based in South Korea. He is best known for portraying Switchblade in Armorsaurs.

== Early life ==
Kang was born in the overseas territorial collectivity of Saint Pierre and Miquelon, France, to a Korean father and a French mother. He lived there until he was five, then lived briefly in Spain before immigrating to Canada and settling there. His mother and siblings were originally French citizens who later acquired Canadian citizenship, making him a dual citizen of France and Canada. However, having grown up in Canada since he was young, he always presents himself as Canadian and has a strong Canadian identity.

He is the younger brother of mixed martial artists Denis Kang and Tommy Kang.

== Acting career ==
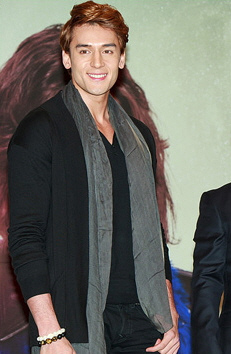
Kang in 2012

In May 2012, Kang starred opposite Ryu Si-won as Kang Gu-ra, a rival fighter to Ryu's Seung-hyuk in Channel A's Goodbye Dear Wife.

On 18 August 2012, Kang was paired with South Korean actress Yoon Se-ah, beginning the transition between season 3 and season 4 of We Got Married. The virtual couple, dubbed the KangYoon couple and Juliah couple by fans, moved into House #1 in the new We Got Married Village. Kang was elected as Chief of the WGM Village by the current couples.

In August 2015, Kang signed with Jellyfish Entertainment.

== Personal life ==
Kang is a trilingual who speaks fluent English, French, and Korean.

On June 27, 2023, Kang announced his engagement to fitness influencer JJ on her YouTube channel. The couple married on May 10, 2024.

== Filmography ==
=== Film ===
Year	Title	Role	Ref.
2014	Casa Amor: Exclusive for Ladies	Muscle man	Cameo
2020	The Prisoner	Jake	
2021	Mission: Possible	Yoo Ri	

=== Television series ===
Year	Title	Role	Network
2008	Star's Lover	Cameo	SBS
2009	Dream	David	SBS
2009	High Kick Through the Roof	Julien	MBC
2010	Personal Taste	Cameo	MBC
2010	Road No. 1	U.S. Marine Corps Platoon Leader	MBC
2011	Real School!	Cameo	MBC Every 1
2011	High Kick: Revenge of the Short Legged	Julien	MBC
2012	12 Signs of Love	Alex	tvN
2012	Goodbye Dear Wife	Kang Gu-ra	Channel A
2012	To the Beautiful You	Daniel Dawson	SBS
2013	Potato Star 2013QR3	Julian	tvN
2014	Golden Cross	Evan	KBS2
2014	Marriage, Not Dating	Richard Bernstein	tvN
2016	Entourage	Cameo (Episode 9)	tvN
2017	Fight for My Way	John Karellas (Cameo, Episodes 13–14, 16)	KBS2
2020	300 Year-Old Class of 2020	Julien Kang (Cameo, Episode 5)	YouTube, Naver TV, KakaoTV
2025	Armorsaurs	Johnny/Switchblade	Main role

=== Variety show ===
Year	Title	Notes/Ref.
2012–2013	We Got Married	Cast member (Episodes 133–159)
2013–2015	Our Neighborhood Arts and Physical Education	Cast member (Episodes 29–38, 41–43, 46–52, 101–102); Guest (Episode 116)
2015–2016	Real Man 2	Cast member
2016	Law of the Jungle in Mongolia	Cast member (Episodes 234–237)
2017	Society Game 2	Cast member
2018	Law of the Jungle in Mexico	Cast member (Episodes 320–324)
2019
2019	Happy Together	Guest (Episode 603)
2019	Law of the Jungle in Chatham Islands	Cast member (Episodes 358–362)
2019	Master in the House	Special appearance (Episode 89-90)
2021
2021	Law of the Jungle in South Korea	Cast member (Episodes 432–433)
2021	Cooking - The Birth of a Cooking King	Contestant
2021	Wild Idol	Trainer
2021	The Strong Man 2	Team leader
2022	The King of Ssireum	Contestant; Spinoff
2024	Knowing Brothers	Guest (Ep. 433)

=== Reality show ===
Year	Title	Role
2020	Handsome Tigers	Cast member (Episode 1-present)

=== Music video appearances ===
Year	Song title	Artist	Role/Notes
2010	"No PlayBoy"	Nine Muses	Male lead
2012	"Because I'm Upset" (속상해서) (also known as "Depressed")	Zia	Male lead (with Mina Fujii)
