= Shinvi =

South Korean girl group

SHINVI
- Genres: Pop & R&B
- Years active: 2001-2004
- Label: SM Entertainment
- Past members: Yoo Soojin; Oh Sangeun; Yuna

Shinvi (Korean: 신비) was a South Korean girl group. Shinvi was formed by SM Entertainment in 2001, however, they were from an alternative label of SM, called Cid.K Entertainment.. The group is composed of Yoo Soo-jin, Oh Sang-eun and Yu-na. The group released their debut album 15 to 30 in April 2002. They appeared on music and variety shows, magazines, and SMTOWN concerts before disbanding.

A curious fact is that they trained with some members of TVXQ, Super Junior, and Girls' Generation when they were trainees at SM Entertainment.

== Members ==
- Yoo Soojin (Korean: 유수진), born 6 March 1983. She was chosen to join Shinvi from the "1st SM Entertainment Best Youth Contest". After group became inactive, Soo-jin appeared in advertisements for makeup brand Estée Lauder. In December 2012, she was listed as a model for Racing Model Agency GL P&P.
- Oh Sangeun (Korean: 오상은), born 24 August 1984. Her introduction to the K-pop scene was a duet with Moon Hee-joon, for the song "Our Story". She has appeared in the Korean productions of the musicals Grease, A Chorus Line, and The Magicians. Following the inactivity of her group, Sang-eun signed with agency M Boat and now goes by the stage name of Ne;MO. The main song of her first single was a duet with Daesung of Big Bang. In 2009, she was a guest vocalist for female group Miss $, taking part in their first album. She has released five solo singles, and additionally collaborated with MC Mong as well as Ga-In of Brown Eyed Girls. She most recently appeared on I Can See Your Voice (season 4 episode 14) as a contestant and was eliminated at the final stage. Her identity was revealed as co-host and fellow former SM trainee Leeteuk recognized her. She stated that she had been largely involved in musical theater and some solo activities since the group's disbandment.
- Yuna (Korean: 유나), born 18 April 1985. After Shinvi's disbandment, she returned to school and pursued a career in law. She passed the bar exam in 2010, though this wasn't reported in the media until 2012. When the news became known, Ne;MO requested via her Twitter account that she will live alone to live a normal life.

== Discography ==
=== Studio albums ===
- 15 to 30, April 2002

=== Collaborations ===
- Summer Vacation In SMTown.com, June 2002
- 2002 Winter Vacation in SMTOWN.com - My Angel My Light, December 2002
