= A Bizarre Love Triangle =

- Directed by: Lee Mu-yeong
- Written by: Park Chan-wook; Lee Mu-yeong
- Starring: Gong Hyo-jin; Jo Eun-ji; Choi Gwang-il
- Music by: Dalpalan
- Production company: Egg Films
- Distributed by: New Line Korea
- Release date: December 6, 2002 (South Korea)
- Country: South Korea
- Language: Korean

A Bizarre Love Triangle (Korean: 철없는 아내와 파란만장한 남편, 그리고 태권소녀; lit. 'The Immature Wife, the Eventful Husband, and the Taekwondo Girl', also known as Taekwon Girl) is a 2002 South Korean film.

It was directed by Mu-yeong Lee, an early Park Chan-wook collaborator, and co-written by Park Chan-wook and Mu-yeong Lee.

== Plot ==
In the year 2030, a man arrives on the moon. He is early for a wedding and an older guest offers to tell him the story of the groom's father Doo-Chan.

In 2002 in Seoul, South Korea, female Taekwondo instructor Keum-Sook arrives at a comedy club and watches comedian Doo-Chan perform. After his performance he walks backstage argues with his wife Eun-hee who asks for money. After Doo-Chan leaves, Keum-Sook calls out to Eun-hee.

Doo-Chan's begins to think Eun-hee is cheating on him. He learns that his wife is taking Taekwondo lessons and, when spying in the window, sees Keum-Sook and Eun-hee sleeping together, causing him to fall three-stories off the ledge he was standing on.

The film then flashes back to show Keum-Sook and Eun-hee meeting in high school. Keum-Sook is immediately smitten with Eun-hee, beating up a group of guys to pay for them to go to a bath house together and later borrows money from her blind friend so Eun-hee can get the boob job she wants. The money is later stolen. They are shown to be close friends after high school and Keum-Sook opens a taekwondo studio.

On Eun-hee's birthday Keum-Sook gives her a ring in a glass of wine, but Eun-hee implies that they have not been psychical together. They go out of town to party. At their hotel room Keum-Sook cries while Eun-hee sleeps, but Eun-hee awakens and kisses her. At a bar the next night, two men hit on the women, while Eun-hee is willing to talk after she sees they have money Keum-Sook is not. She hits one over the head with a bottle. The police are called and Keum-Sook is arrested. As Eun-hee tries to talk a police officer out of it, he gets a little handsy with her. Keum-Sook breaks out of the cop car she is in and launches a flying kick at the police officer.

She is jailed for 21 months; she is picked up by her blind friend. Eun-hee has had a baby. She doesn't know who the father is and needs money for a bone marrow transplant to save her child. Popular TV star Doo-Chan is enlisted to raise money on TV. Keum-Sook asks her blind friend for the money. The woman says she isn't a millionaire and says she will give the money if Keum-Sook gives her, her eyes. Both are silent, but the woman says she was just kidding.

Doo-Chan offers to pay for the surgery on TV to increase his reputation in the public, while Keum-Sook gets her friend drunk and then breaks into her house to steal the money. As she is leaving the cops show up and she does a flying kick while trying to escape.

She is jailed for 2 years; her blind friend, again, picks her up. Keum-Sook apologizes for stealing from her. Her friend asks why she hasn't asked about Eun-hee, who got married. Keum-Sook says she knows. Her friends gets her a new taekwondo studio and tells her to move on with her life. She does for a while, but then goes to the comedy show from the beginning of the movie and the two women begin an affair together.

The film then returns to after Doo-Chan's fall. He gets Eun-hee to admit that she loves Keum-Sook. He says he will give her a divorce and half his money, but only under one condition, he gets to sleep with Keum-Sook, while Eun-hee watches so she know how he felt. When Eun-hee asks Keum-Sook she punches a window and cuts her hand, but ultimately agrees.

3 months later, Keum-Sook is pregnant and, much to the shock and ire of Eun-hee, does not want to get an abortion. After the couple and Doo-Chan argue, it is agreed that they will all move in together and raise the child.

At first only Keum-Sook and Eun-hee sleep together, but after the baby is born and Doo-Chan has been backlisted from woking in TV because he is living with a lesbian couple Eun-hee and Doo-Chan begin to sleep together again too.

In the future, it is revealed that the wedding on the moon is a gay wedding, between the polycule's baby, who is now all grown up, and his partner. Keum-Sook, Eun-hee, Doo-Chan, now old, hold hands together and happily watch their son get married.

== Cast ==
- Gong Hyo-jin as Hwang Geum-sook
- Jo Eun-ji as Bae Eun-hee
- Choi Kwang-il as Oh Doo-chan
- Jung Gi-sub as Police officer / Security staff
- Baek Hyeon-jin as Big man
- Yoo Hye-ri as the masseuse/blind friend
- Kim Ki-hyun as Seok Man-chang, the old man

== Production ==
This was Gong Hyo-jin's first role as a leading lady. Jo Eun-ji has said that she was still developing as an actor and felt she wasn't strong enough as the other lead in the film.

== Critical reception ==
Variety called the film a "slick and silly Korean comedy." Kyunghyang Shinmun called it "noteworthy as an unusual film dealing with the themes of homosexuality and dual marriage."

The film has been grouped with other important gay films of the early 2000s in South Korea such as Whispering Corridors 2: Memento Mori (1999) and Bungee Jumping of Their Own (2001).
