= Lee Mu-yeong =

South Korean filmmaker and writer (born 1962)

- Born: Song Chung-seop; June 14, 1962 (age 64); Seoul, South Korea
- Education: Rutgers University School of Business
- Years active: 1983–present

Korean name
- Hangul: 송충섭
- Hanja: 宋忠燮
- RR: Song Chungseop
- MR: Song Ch'ungsŏp

Pen name
- Hangul: 이무영
- Hanja: 李武榮
- RR: I Muyeong
- MR: I Muyŏng

Song Chung-seop (Korean: 송충섭; born June 14, 1962), better known by the pen name Lee Mu-yeong (Korean: 이무영) is a South Korean film director, screenwriter, novelist and theater critic.

== Early life ==
He was born in Gwangju, Gyeonggi Province, and grew up in Seoul. The son of a pastor, their family emigrated to the United States while he was in high school. Later, he enrolled to School of Business at the Rutgers University. In 1983, while still in the U.S., he made his debut as a theater critic.

== Career ==
=== Early career (1990–1996) ===
Song Chung-seop his professional career as a radio producer at joined Catholic Peace Broadcasting, a position he held until July 1991. In March 1992, he debuted as a theater director and adopted the pen name Lee Mu-young. He followed this shortly after with his debut as a music critic in June 1992.

In February 1993, Lee enrolled in the graduate program for Theater and Film Studies at Chung-Ang University. Throughout 1993, he established a wide range of professional credits: becoming a film critic in March, a poet in June, a theater actor in July, and a musical actor in October. He subsequently debuted as an essayist in May 1994. After graduating from Chung-Ang University in February 1995, Lee transitioned quickly into the film industry. He began working as a film critic that April, followed by his debuts as both an actor and a screenwriter in early 1996, the latter for the film Born to Kill.

=== The Park-Ri-Damae partnership ===
Lee and Park Chan-wook first met in 1991 through an introduction by actor Song Seung-hwan. Their professional relationship strengthened as Park became a frequent guest on Lee's radio program. Reflecting on their partnership, Park noted that while Lee's early scripts seemed amateurish, their unconventional nature provided a creative freedom that allowed the pair to "hit it off" immediately. Lee has described their collaborative process as a seamless partnership without a formal division of labor; they often alternate between dictating and typing, a method Lee believes is significantly more efficient than writing alone.

In 2000, they established the collective pen name Park-Ri-Damae (Korean: 박리다매) a portmanteau of their surnames inspired by the production company Oeyu Naegang. Their first official credit under this name was for Yoo Young-sik's Anarchists (2000). Their collaboration continued through a prolific period that included Park's Joint Security Area (2000), Lee's The Humanist (2001), and the 2002 films A Bizarre Love Triangle (directed by Lee) and Sympathy for Mr. Vengeance (directed by Park).

In 2003, Lee returned to the United States to attend a graduate program in Theatre and Stage Production at Theatre and Stage Production at Kean University in New Jersey, earning his master's degree in 2005. That same year, he reunited with Park Chan-wook as Park-Ri-Damae, working with director Yoon Tae-yong to co-write the screenplay for the fantasy film Boy Goes to Heaven.

=== Later career and academic work (2009–present) ===
Lee's later career combined academic and literary pursuits. He served as an adjunct professor in the Department of Theater and Film at Seokyeong University from February 2009 to August 2009. In July 2011, he acted as a jury member for the competition section of the 7th Jecheon International Music & Film Festival in Chungcheongbuk-do. His debut as a novelist followed in September 2011. Since August 2015, he has served as an associate professor in the Department of Film Studies at Dongseo University.

== Personal life ==
=== Family ===
Born into a religious household as the son of a pastor, Lee is a practicing Christian who maintains a daily morning prayer routine. He is married to former actress Jang Soo-young, the younger sister of actor Jang Se-jin. The couple met while attending the wedding of announcers Son Beom-soo and Jin Yang-hye as guests of the groom and bride, respectively.

=== Politic ===
Progressive New Party Standing Committee Member and Special Advisor for Cultural and Arts Administration (July 2008 - November 2008)

== Bibliography ==
List of published works
Year	Title		Category	Note
Year	English	Korean	Category	Note
1992	Neglected Marrow: Dad Freddie Lennon, Reserve Lieutenant in the British Navy	외면을 받은 골수 기러기 아빠 프레디 레논 예비역 영국 해군 상사	Music Criticism	
1992	Chungsubi at Twenty-Two	스물둘의 충섭이	Poetry	
1993	Peeking at Humphrey Bogart's Clark Gable Lady	험프리 보가트 형님의 클라크 게이블 아우님 훔쳐보기	Film Criticism	
1994	Like the Tide, Like the Wave of Affection	밀물 같은 호감, 썰물 같은 정...	Essay	
1995	The Origin of the National Central Theater of Korea, the Theater Group Shinhyup	대한민국 국립중앙극장의 기원이 된 극단 신협	Theater Criticism	
2008	Dreaming	꿈꾀끼꼴깡	Essay	People Who Own the Future, 272 pages
2011	New Village	새남터	Novel	First full-length novel, Human and Book Publishing
2013	The Pretentious Romanticist	각하는 로맨티스트	Novel	Human and Book Publishing
2015	Rediscovering Masterpieces	명곡의 재발견	Music Criticism	Score Publishing, 488 pages

== Filmography ==
=== Filmmaking credit ===
Feature Film Credits
Year	Title	Credited as		Notes	Ref.
Year	Title	Director	Screenwriter	Notes	Ref.
1996	Born to Kill	No	Co-writing (Note: Collaborating with Jang Hyun-soo and Song Hae-sung)	Screenwriter debut	
1997	Trio	No	Co-writing (Note: Collaboration with Park Chan-wook)		
2000	Anarchists	No	Co-writing (Note: Collaboration with Park Chan-wook and Bangnidamae)		
2000	Joint Security Area	No	Co-writing (Note: Collaboration with Kim Hyun-seok, Jeong Seong-san and Park Chan-wook)		
2001	The Humanist	Yes	Co-writing	Film director debut	
2002	Sympathy for Mr. Vengeance	No	Co-writing (Note: Collaboration with Lee Jae-soon, Park Chan-wook and Lee Yong-jong)		
2002	A Bizarre Love Triangle	Yes	Co-writing		
2005	Boy Goes to Heaven	No	Co-writing (Note: Collaboration with Park Seong-kyeong, Park Chan-wook, Lee Moo-yeong, Choi Dong-hoon, Yoon Tae-yong)		
2008	Like Father, Like Son	Yes	Yes		
2008	Just Kidding	Yes	Yes		
2016	Han River Blues	Yes	Co-writing (Note: Collaboration with Han Chang-seong)	Also as producer	

== Acting ==
=== Film ===
Acting credit
Year	Title	Role	Notes
1996	Transmutated Head		Cameo
2001	My Sassy Girl		Cameo
2002	No Blood No Tears	Manager	Cameo
2012	How to Use Guys with Secret Tips	Morning Pro Male MC	
2012	Sex, Lies, and Videotape	Udon restaurant owner	

=== Television ===
Television appearances
Year	Title	Role	Network	Notes
1993–1995	The Nation Now		KBS	Morning news program, movie segment host
1996	Color – Red	actor	KBS	TV series
1996–2000	SBS Midnight TV Entertainment		SBS TV	
1999–2000	Movie Show Movies Are Good	Film critic	iTV	TV show
2009	Cinema Paradiso	Panelist	EBS	TV show
2012	A Good Day to Watch a Movie	MC	TV Chosun	TV show
2013	Yoo Jae-sik's Business	Special panelist	JTBC	TV show
2018	Somehow an Adult	Lecturer	tvN Story	Special lecture
2025	New-Oldboy Park Chan-wook	Himself	SBS TV	SBS TV Special Chuseok Documentary

=== Radio ===
Radio show
Year	Title	Role	Network	Notes
1990	Youth's Music World	PD	PBC	
1996–1998	Movie Express	DJ	DCN	
1998–2000	Lee Mu-young's Popsworld	DJ	KBS 2FM	
2008–2012	Lee Mu-young's Pop English	DJ	EBS FM	
2012	Short Story World	Narrator	EBS FM	
2015	Reading Radio Reading Series	DJ	EBS FM	

== Theater ==
Theater performance
Year	Title	Role	Genre	Notes
1992	King Lear	—N/a	Theater	Director
1993	Hamlet	King Claudius	Theater	Actor, Lead role
1993	Guys and Dolls	Benny Southstreet	Musical	Supporting Actor
2004	Sunday Seoul (선데이 서울)	—N/a	Theater	Playwright

== Awards and nominations ==
Award	Date of ceremony	Category	Recipient(s)	Result	Ref.
Busan International Film Festival Asian Project Market	2011	Grand Prize	Saenamteo	Won	
Lotte Entertainment Screenplay Contest	2013	Grand Prize	Ok-hee	Won	
