= J-Walk 2007 =

J-Walk 2007 Mini Album

Studio album by J-Walk
- Released: 18 October 2007
- Genre: Dance/Techno Ballad K-Pop
- Label: Vitamin Entertainment (South Korea)

J-Walk chronology
| Someday (2002) | J-Walk 2007 Mini Album (2007) | My Love (2008) |

J-Walk 2007 Mini Album is a mini album by Korean duo male group J-Walk.

== Track listing ==
| No. | Title | Length |
|---|---|---|
| 1. | "여우비 (Sunshower)" |
| 2. | "외사랑 (Outside Love)" |
| 3. | "Focus" |
| 4. | "여우비 (Sunshower) J_Beat Mix (Feat. 명준)" |
| 5. | "외사랑 (Outside Love)(Acoustic Ver.)" |
| 6. | "Focus (Inst Ver.)" |
| 7. | "외사랑 (Outside Love)(Inst Ver.)" |
| 8. | "여우비 (Sunshower)(Inst Ver.)" |
