= Chun Myung-hoon =

South Korean singer (born 1978)

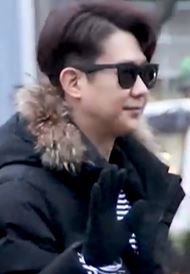
- Chun in 2017

Background information
- Born: April 6, 1978 (age 48); Seoul, South Korea
- Genres: K-pop; dance pop
- Occupations: Singer; rapper; actor
- Years active: 1996–present
- Labels: Music Factory Entertainment; Genie Music
- Formerly of: HamoHamo; NRG; HOTSechgodRG

- Chun Myung-hoon
- Hangul: 천명훈
- Hanja: 千明勳
- RR: Cheon Myeonghun
- MR: Ch'ŏn Myŏnghun

Chun Myung-hoon (Korean: 천명훈; born April 6, 1978) is a South Korean singer, rapper, actor and television presenter. He is a former member of boy band NRG. He released his single, Welcome To The Jungle on October 19, 2012. He is well known as a cast member on several TV shows, including Girl Spirit.

== Career ==
=== Early years ===
Chun's passion for dance began early and he had been part of a break-dancing crew during his teenage years. Despite his father's opposition to him entering show business, Chun began his career as a backup dancer and debuted in 1996 as one-half of the dance-pop duo Hamo Hamo with Lee Sung-jin, while Noh Yoo-min and Moon Sung-hoon served as their backup dancers. The foursome would go on to form NRG. As they debuted around the same time as H.O.T., Chun quipped on Handsome Boys of the 20th Century that NRG would not have been formed had Hamo Hamo not been overshadowed by the massive success of H.O.T.

=== 1997–2009: NRG, military service and disbandment ===
In 1997, the four members of Hamo Hamo and new addition Kim Hwan-sung (died in 2000) were formed into a boy band called NRG, which stood for "New Radiancy Group". The group had their big break with the 2003 single "Hit Song", composed by Chun, and won their first ever #1 on a music program. With Moon having left the group in 2004, the group took a break before releasing their seventh album One of Five. They went on hiatus while Chun and Noh served their mandatory military service from 2007 to 2009. However their future plans of a comeback were put on hold due to Lee's fraud and gambling investigation and they eventually agreed to go their separate ways.

=== 2009–2016: Solo activities ===
After NRG's disbandment, Chun was the only member who remained in the entertainment industry; Noh and Moon had both entered the business world while Lee stayed out of the public eye due to his legal troubles. Chun began his career as a solo singer and a cast member on various variety shows. He was a main cast member on the variety-reality show Handsome Boys of the 20th Century which featured his fellow first-generation counterparts Moon Hee-jun and Tony An of H.O.T., Sechs Kies leader and rapper Eun Ji-won and rapper Danny Ahn of g.o.d, all of whom were born in the year 1978. The five entertainers formed a "group" called HOTSechgodRG, a combination of all their idol group names, and remade NRG's debut song "I Can Do It" (할 수 있어).

On October 22, 2016, Chun reunited with Noh Yoo-min and Lee Sung-jin to announce that NRG would be returning the following year to celebrate the 20th anniversary of their debut.

=== 2017–present: NRG's comeback ===
On February 13, 2022, Chun announced he would be releasing a single titled "Never Going Back," which featured NRG members Noh and Moon, as well as singer Lisa. Despite being released under his name, he billed the single as "his last song with NRG."

== Discography ==
Title	Album details	Notes
Welcome to the Jungle	Released: October 19, 2010; Label: Genie Music; Format: Digital download; Track listing: 1. 정글; 2. 정글 (instr.)	

=== As a featured artist ===
Title	Year	Album	Ref.
경희를 내 품에 (Kim Tae-woo, Noh Yoo-min, Lyn, Park Hyo-shin, Rain, Lee Ki-chan, Lee Hye-sun and Chun Myung-hoon)	2010	Non-album single	
"Lovely" (Koyote feat. Chun Myung-hoon)	2010	Koyote Ugly	

== Filmography ==
=== Film ===
Year	Title	Role	Ref.
2006	The Legend of Seven Cutter	Han-soo's brother	

=== Variety shows ===
Year	Title	Notes
2003–2006	Real Romance Love Letter	Regular cast
2005–2006	S	Host
2013	Handsome Boys of the 20th Century	Regular cast; 29 episodes
2014	Where Is My Superhero?	Regular cast
2016	Girl Spirit	Cast member ("guru" team)

=== Music video appearances ===
Year	Title	Artist
2014	"Sali Go Dali Go" (살리고 달리고)	Kim Jong-min
