= Danny Ahn =

South Korean-American singer and actor (born 1978)

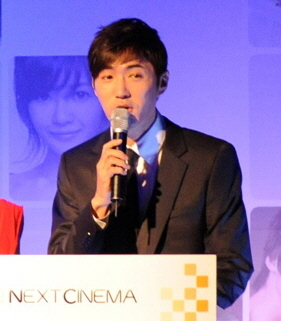
- Ahn in 2011
- Born: December 22, 1978 (age 47); Seattle, Washington, U.S.
- Other name: Ahn Shin-won
- Education: Dankook University
- Occupations: Actor; singer; rapper; radio DJ; host
- Agent(s): Gemstone E&M
- Musical career
- Genres: K-pop; Hip hop
- Instrument: Vocals
- Years active: 1999–present
- Labels: Sidus HQ; Cuz-9
- Member of: g.o.d

Korean name
- Hangul: 안신원
- RR: An Sinwon
- MR: An Sinwŏn

Danny Ahn (Korean: 데니안; born December 22, 1978) is an American entertainer best known as the main rapper of the South Korean pop music group g.o.d. Having made his debut in the entertainment industry as a member of g.o.d in 1999, Ahn has gone into acting and has also been a radio DJ and MC.

== Early life ==
Ahn was born in Seattle, Washington, and holds American citizenship, although he later moved to South Korea with his family and spent most of his schooling years there. He and g.o.d bandmate Joon Park are first cousins; Ahn's father is the youngest sibling of Joon's mother. When he was in elementary school his parents divorced and he and his older sister went to live with their mother. As a teenager, he began aspiring to become a singer after listening to Seo Taiji and Boys. He studied Theater and Film at Dankook University.

== Career ==
=== Beginnings ===
Ahn's professional career began with his debut in the K-pop industry as a rapper for singer Uhm Jung-hwa. He was also part of a mixed-gender project group along with his friend Son Ho-young, Shoo and Kim Hwan-sung but it fell through; Kim was later recruited as the final member of NRG and Shoo joined S.M. Entertainment where she would debut as part of girl group S.E.S.

In 1997 Ahn was recruited by his cousin Joon for a project group he was forming. Between 1997 and 1998, Son, Yoon Kye-sang and Kim Sun-a were recruited through auditions while Park Jin-young joined the group as their producer and mentor. However, Kim Sun-a left to pursue acting and was replaced with Kim Tae-woo, then still a high school student. The group eventually became a five-man boy band and named g.o.d, short for "Groove Over Dose".

=== 1999–2005: Success with g.o.d ===
After a lukewarm response to their debut performance in January 1999, the group went on to become one of the most popular K-pop groups in the 2000s. Ahn occasionally composed his own rap lyrics. The group later switched from SidusHQ to JYP Entertainment, with two members switching agencies while Ahn and Yoon renewed their individual contracts at SidusHQ. In 2004, Yoon left the group and g.o.d continued as a quartet until December 2005.

=== 2006–2013: Solo activities and projects ===
Ahn ventured into the radio industry prior to g.o.d going on hiatus in late December 2005. He became as a radio DJ on KBS Cool FM and was the first host of Kiss the Radio before taking over Lee Soo-young as host of the long-running afternoon program Music Show. He was invited back to be a guest DJ for the "Homecoming Day" special in 2015, in honor of KBS Cool FM's 50th anniversary.

Ahn released his solo single album on May 28, 2007 "If It Were A Dream", which featured a cappella group Sweet Sorrow. He has since largely done guest vocals for other artists such as Rain, his bandmate Kim Tae-woo, SG Wannabe and Kim Dong-wan of fellow first-generation group Shinhwa. Alongside his music career, Ahn also took roles in TV shows and films. In 2008, he appeared in Crazy Waiting, also known as The Longest 24 Months. He appeared as Baek-ho in the KBS drama, The Slave Hunters. He appeared in KBS Let's Go Dream Team! Season 2, and was the leader of the team. He also appeared as Manager Baek Nam-jung in The Fugitive: Plan B alongside Rain, Lee Jung-jin, Daniel Henney and Lee Na-young, and in The Innocent Man with Song Joong-ki and Moon Chae-won. He was a permanent guest on SBS's talk show Strong Heart.

Despite g.o.d going on hiatus, Ahn has reunited with his bandmates several times for collaborations. Ahn, Son Ho-young and Park Joon-hyung were featured in the song "Memories and Remembrance", from Kim Tae-woo's mini album T-Virus. He also joined Kim and Son to perform their song "Lies" on the Music Bank special celebrating 600 episodes and at the 2012 Korean Music Festival in Los Angeles.

In May 2012, Ahn starred opposite Dave K. Wong as Gye Dong-hee, a friend to Ryu's Seung-hyuk in Channel A's Goodbye Dear Wife. He served as a commentator/host on We Got Married along with Lee Ji-hye, with hosts Park Mi-sun and Kim Jung-min before leaving the show on May 31, 2014. In 2013 he joined Top Gear Korea to host the fourth season.

Ahn was part of a project group called HOTSechgodRG, which comprises himself and four other members of first-generation idol groups who were born in 1978. The group was first conceived after former H.O.T member Moon Hee-joon invited Ahn, Tony An (H.O.T), Eun Ji-won (Sechs Kies) and Chun Myung-hoon (NRG) to create a reality show version of the television series Reply 1997 in which they would meet up at a rented house to chat and reflect on their heyday. The show was called Handsome Boys of the 20th Century and also featured special guests, mainly their former bandmates and contemporaries. The group has also launched a music video and performed on Immortal Songs: Singing the Legend. The following year, in 2014, they starred in Where is My Superhero? on OnStyle.

=== 2014–present: g.o.d reunion and other activities ===
Ahn's contract with his previous agency SidusHQ expired, and he signed with Box Media in March 2014. He reunited with his g.o.d bandmates to prepare for their eighth album to celebrate the fifteen anniversary of their debut. Following the release of the album in July, the group embarked on a nationwide concert tour.

Ahn starred in the SBS drama Witch's Castle, in which he portrayed the antagonist. His appearances on television are largely on variety shows such as Infinite Challenge, Fantastic Duo, King of Mask Singer and The Friends in Chiang Mai. He reunited with HOTSechgodRG members Chun Myung-hoon and Tony An on Eun Ji-won's new travel reality show Plan Man. The group, except Eun, most recently met up at Moon Hee-joon's bachelor party, part of which was shown on My Little Old Boy, the reality show Tony An was participating in.

In July 2018, Ahn re-signed with former agency SidusHQ. He had joined New Able Entertainment in 2016 but it was acquired by SidusHQ and he was one of several artists who opted to transfer to SidusHQ.

From August 2019 until January 2023, Son and Ahn have co-hosted a radio-style talk show g.o.d's Lunch Attack which aired on Naver's streaming app Naver NOW. at noon on weekdays.

In June 2022, Ahn renewed his contract with Cuz-9 Entertainment. In June 2024, he and fellow g.o.d member Kim Tae-woo signed with Gemstone E&M.

== Personal life ==
He has one older sister.

== Discography ==
=== Singles ===
==== As a lead artist ====
Year	Song	Album
2007	"If It Were A Dream" (feat. Sweet Sorrow)	Non-album single

==== As a featured artist ====
Year	Track	Album	Peak positions^{1}		Notes
Year	Track	Album	KOR Weekly	KOR Monthly	Notes
2002	"What's Love" (Rain feat. Danny, Lexy, Byul and JYP)	Bad Guy			
2006	사랑했어요 (SG Wannabe feat. Danny Ahn)	The 3rd Masterpiece			
2009	기억과 추억 (Kim Tae-woo feat. Park Joon-hyung, Danny Ahn and Son Ho-young)	T-Virus			
2010	"I'm Sorry" (The Film feat. Danny Ahn)	2nd Episode	68	—	
2011	크게 라디오를 켜고 (remake) (The Koxx and KBS Cool FM DJs: Lee Hyun-woo, Choi Kang-hee, Danny Ahn, Leeteuk and Eunhyuk)	Non-album single			
2015	"Memories" (Kim Bo-kyung feat. Danny Ahn)	0516			
2015	"Hometown" (뽀레버막내) (Kim Tae-woo feat. Danny Ahn)	T-Road			
2015	"My Friend" (Kim Dong-wan feat. Danny Ahn)	D			

=== Soundtrack appearances ===
Date	Track	Title	Notes
2012	죽어도 넌 내 사랑 (Danny Ahn with Misty)	Goodbye Dear Wife OST	
2014	"One Day" (하루만) (Son Ho-young feat. Danny Ahn)	Marriage, Not Dating OST	Featured artist

== Lyrics and composition ==
Year	Song	Artist	Album	Note
1999	"Say g.o.d"	g.o.d	Chapter 2	lyrics co-written with Park Jin-young, Park Joon-hyung, Yoon Kye-sang, Son Ho-young and Kim Tae-woo
2000	"g.o.d Party"	g.o.d	Chapter 3	lyrics co-written with Park Jin-young, Park Joon-hyung, Yoon Kye-sang, Son Ho-young and Kim Tae-woo
2000	"Sky Blue Balloon"	g.o.d	Chapter 3	lyrics co-written with Park Jin-young, Park Joon-hyung, Yoon Kye-sang, Son Ho-young and Kim Tae-woo
2001	"Sad Love"	g.o.d	Chapter 4	lyrics co-written with Park Joon-hyung, Yoon Kye-sang, Son Ho-young and Kim Tae-woo
2001	"134-14"	g.o.d	Chapter 4	lyrics and music co-written with Park Joon-hyung, Yoon Kye-sang, Son Ho-young and Kim Tae-woo
2002	"Us"	g.o.d	Chapter 5: Letter	lyrics and music
2002	"What's Love"	Rain	Bad Guy	lyrics and music
2003	슬픈 이별 뒤로	Cha Tae-hyun	The Book	lyrics
2004	"Familiar Strangers"	g.o.d	An Ordinary Day	Music and arrangement
2014	"Sky Blue Promise"	g.o.d	Chapter 8	lyrics co-written with Duble Sidekick
2014	"Smile"	g.o.d	Chapter 8	lyrics co-written with Duble Sidekick
2014	"Stand Up"	g.o.d	Chapter 8	lyrics co-written with Black Eyed Pilseung and Son Ho-young
2014	"I Like It"	g.o.d	Chapter 8	lyrics co-written with Kiggen and Hanhae
2014	"The Lone Duckling"	g.o.d	Chapter 8	rap lyrics co-written with Duble Sidekick
2014	"One Day" (하루만)	Son Ho-young ft. Danny Ahn	Marriage, Not Dating OST	rap lyrics co-written with Kim Won and Jang Jung-woo
2015	뽀레버막내	Kim Tae-woo	T-Road	lyrics
2016	"My Friend"	Kim Dong-wan	K	lyrics co-written with Song Yang-ha, Kim Dong-yeol and Brand Newjiq

== Filmography ==
=== Television series ===
Year	Title	Role	Notes
2006	Banjun Drama		
2008	Innocent You	Kang Eun-hwan	
2009	High Kick Through the Roof	Ahn Shin-won	Cameo
2010	The Slave Hunters	Baek-ho	
2010	The Woman Who Still Wants to Marry	Kim Bu-ki's ex-boyfriend	Cameo
2010	The Fugitive: Plan B	Baek Nam-jung	
2011	Real School!		Cameo
2011	Lie to Me	Hyun Ki-joon's friend	Cameo
2011	When Women Powder Twice	Han Sun-woo	
2012	Goodbye Dear Wife	Gye Dong-hee	
2012	The Innocent Man	Kim Jung-hoon	Cameo (Ep. 2, 15)
2013	Fantasy Tower	Dal-soo	
2014	12 Years Promise	Yoo Soo-han	
2014	KBS Drama Special – "Pitch Black"	Park Hyun-tae	
2015	Romance of 7 Days	Ahn Jun-seo	
2015	The Three Witches	Baek Eun-yong	
2017	Bravo My Life	Audition judge	Cameo
2017	Justice Team 2	Lee Dae-ho	
2019	Level Up	Park Gi-woo	
2021	Imitation	Ji-hak	
2022	O'PENing – "Don't Announce Your Husband's Death"	Yoon Chan-bum	
2023	The Escape of the Seven		Cameo

=== Film ===
Year	Title	Role
2008	Crazy Waiting	Seo Min-cheol
2011	Head	Kang Seung-wan
2023	Chabak - Night of Murder and Romance	Soo-won

=== Variety shows ===
Year	Title	Notes
2009–2010	Let's Go! Dream Team Season 2	Regular cast; 25 episodes
2013	Handsome Boys of the 20th Century	Regular cast; 29 episodes
2014	Where Is My Superhero?	Regular cast
2015	The Friends in Chiang Mai	With Park Joon-hyung and Ryohei Otani

=== Web shows ===
Year	Title	Role	Notes	Ref.
2017	Travel For Me	Cast Member	With Ryu Seung-soo, Choi Philip and Park Gyu-ri	
2022	Let's Watch Soccer Together	Host		

=== Music video appearances ===
Year	Title	Artist
2015	"Lonely Funk"	Kim Tae-woo

=== Radio ===
Year	Name
2004–2006	Danny Ahn's Kiss the Radio
2011–2013	Danny Ahn's Music Show
2020–present	g.o.d's Lunch Attack (with Son Ho-young)

== Awards ==
Year	Category	Work	Result
2004	KBS Entertainment Awards	Danny Ahn's Kiss the Radio	Won
