= J-Walk =

South Korean musical duo

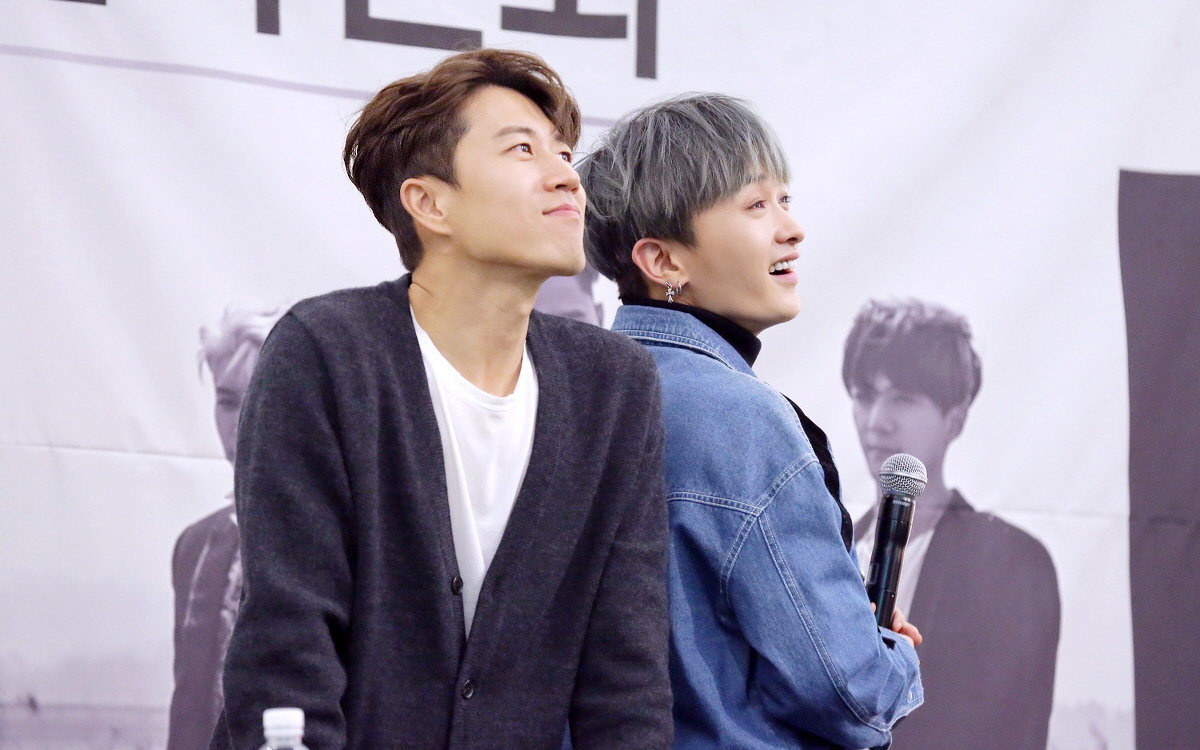
- J-Walk in May 2017; From left to right: Jang Su-won and Kim Jae-duck

Background information
- Origin: Seoul, South Korea
- Genres: K-pop; ballad; R&B; dance
- Years active: 2002; 2007–2008; 2013–2014
- Labels: Kiss Entertainment; Vitamin Entertainment; A&G Modes; YG
- Members: Kim Jae-duck; Jang Su-won

J-Walk (Korean: 제이워크) is a South Korean musical duo formed by two Sechs Kies members. As of 2016, they are under YG Entertainment after reuniting with their group Sechs Kies under the label.

== Members ==
- Jang Suwon (장수원) - vocals
- Kim Jaeduck (김재덕) - choreography & rap

== History ==
After Sechskies had disbanded in 2000, 2 years later, Kim Jae-duck and Jang Su-won formed a duet under Kiss Entertainment, releasing two albums in 2002. Their debut hit Suddenly was very popular among fans, and it went as high as No. 2 on the music charts. However, their follow up album "Someday" was not as successful. They won SBS Gayo Daejeon Popularity Award with former Sechs Kies member Kang Sung-hoon in 2002.

There were talks of releasing a third album for J-Walk. In 2007, they signed with Vitamin Entertainment and released first mini album Sun Shower (여우비) after a five-year hiatus. They held a showcase of its new album in Seoul in October 2007. Eun Ji-won and Lee Jai-jin joined it onstage to congratulate their comeback.

In June 2008, J-Walk collaborated with their former Sechskies leader Eun Ji-won for a new song called "My Love" in the third album. Since Kim Jae-duck entered the military shortly after, Jang Su-won had to promote the album by himself. Jang Su-won entered the military in December 2009 and he was released from the army in October 2011.

After they were discharged from army, J-Walk has signed under A&G Modes and released some digital songs. They returned with mini album Love...Painfully with main track "Strive" in December 2013. During preparing for a new album comeback, they made the difficult decision to adjust their schedule to join past label DSP Media's first family concert DSP Festival with Eun Ji-won on December 14.

In October 2019, YG Entertainment released the duo autumn photo album.

== Discography ==
=== Albums ===
- Suddenly (2002)
- Someday (2002)
- My Love (2008)

=== EPs ===
- J-Walk 2007 Mini Album (2007)
- Love...Painfully (2013)

=== Digital singles ===
1. "안타까워" ("Shame"), 2008
2. "사랑한다 외쳐요" ("Shout Out Love"), 2009
3. "Get On The Floor", 2011 (under the name "J-Walk Kim Jae Duc")
4. "프라프치노" ("Frappuccino"), 2013
5. "첫눈오는 날" ("First Snow"), 2013
6. "무슨말이 필요해" ("What More Can I Say"), 2014 (with Jui (주이))
7. "비나이다" ("I Beg You"), 2014

=== Soundtrack ===
1. Against(반) (OST of Take Care of Us, Captain), 2012

== Awards and nominations ==
Year	Award-Giving Body	Category	Work	Result
2002	Mnet Asian Music Awards	Best Male Group	"Suddenly"	Nominated
2002	SBS Gayo Daejeon	Popularity Award	"Suddenly"	Won
