= Someday (J-Walk album) =

J-Walk Vol. 2 - Someday

Studio album by J-Walk
- Released: 16 October 2002
- Genre: Ballad K-Pop
- Label: Universal Music (South Korea)
- Producer: Ahn Sung-Il

J-Walk chronology
Suddenly (2002)	J-Walk Vol. 2 - Someday (2002)	J-Walk 2007 Mini Album (2007)

Someday is the second album by Korean duo male group J-Walk (Kim Jae Duc and Jang Su Won, former members of Sechskies). According to the Recording Industry Association of Korea, as of the end of December 2002, the album has sold 54,410 copies. This album consolidate their position so they won SBS Gayo Daejeon Popularity Award with former Sechs Kies member Kang Sunghun in 2002.

== Track listing ==
No.	Title	Length
1.	"Please God"	4:30
2.	"아마… (Perhaps...)"	3:58
3.	"Someday"	4:24
4.	"Half Crazy"	4:31
5.	"다시 (Again)"	4:08
6.	"Chain of Love"	4:27
7.	"I Want"	4:35
8.	"사랑해서 미안해 (I'm Sorry I Love You)"	4:21
9.	"From Me"	4:07
10.	"니가 그립지 않다는 거짓말로... (Saying I Don’t Miss You Is A Lie...)"	4:20
