= My Love (J-Walk album) =

J-Walk Vol. 3 - My Love

Studio album by J-Walk
- Released: 19 June 2008
- Genre: Dance/Techno K-Pop
- Label: Vitamin Entertainment (South Korea)

J-Walk chronology
J-Walk 2007 Mini Album (2007)	J-Walk Vol. 3 - My Love (2008)	안타까워 (Shame) (2008)

My Love is the third album by Korean duo male group J-Walk. In this album, J-Walk collaborated with their former Sechskies leader Eun Ji Won for a song called "My Love". The featured song "My Love" is a fast dance song with an electronic rhythm and "J-Walk style" ballad line.

== Track listing ==
No.	Title	Length
1.	"My Love(feat.은지원)"
2.	"참 좋겠어요"
3.	"아마도"
4.	"일년째 프로포즈"
5.	"Focus"
6.	"추억…안녕"
7.	"못된 사랑"
8.	"21세기 우리들의 사랑이야기(feat. Vink)"
9.	"외사랑"
10.	"깍지"
11.	"My love (inst.)"
