= NRG (South Korean band) =

South Korean pop band

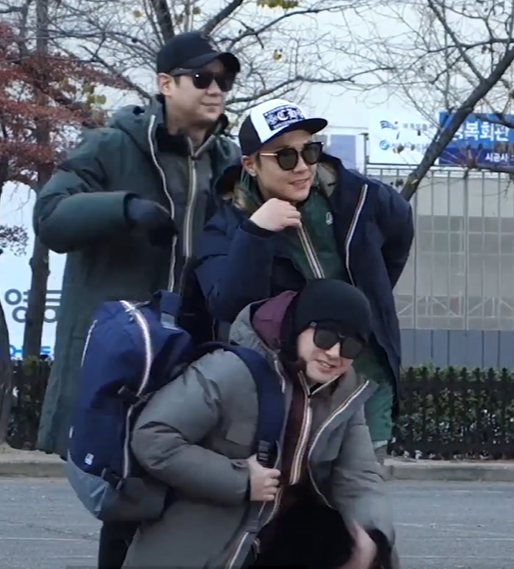
- NRG in 2017

Background information
- Origin: South Korea
- Genres: K-pop; dance-pop
- Years active: 1997–2006; 2017–2018; 2022
- Label: Music Factory
- Spinoff of: HamoHamo
- Past members: Lee Sung-jin; Chun Myung-hoon; Noh Yoo-min; Moon Sung-hoon; Kim Hwan-sung

NRG, acronym for New Radiancy Group (Hangul: 엔알지), was a South Korean pop music group. Originally a five-member boy band consisting of Chun Myung-hoon, Lee Sung-jin, Noh Yoo-min, Moon Sung-hoon, and Kim Hwan-sung, NRG debuted in 1997 to instant success with their first two albums New Radiancy Group and Race. After members Myunghoon and Sungjin departed the group in 1999, the group released their third album, NRG 003, which struggled in popularity after the group's lineup changes. Member Hwansung died on June 15, 2000, which led Myunghoon and Sungjin to return to the group, and to the creation of the group's 4th album Sorrow in 2001.

In 2003 and 2004, the group was propelled into the mainstream after the release of their albums Hit Song and New Radiancy 6 Group, which both contained high charting lead singles that led to the group securing their first music show wins and performing at Olympic related events. After the departure of member Moon Sunghoon in October of 2005, the group released their seventh album, One of Five: Apart & Together before unofficially disbanding in 2006. In 2017 they regrouped as a trio to celebrate the 20th anniversary of their debut and released an extended play before splitting again in 2018 due to personal conflicts amongst the group. A new single "Never Going Back" was released in 2022, with Myunghoon referring to it as his "final single as NRG."

NRG is considered to be the pioneers of dance pop in the K-pop industry and their repertoire has been described as "high energy dance music". Their songs notably sample elements of Eurobeat and electronic music. They are also the earliest known K-pop group to incorporate acrobatic stunts into their choreography. Today, NRG is widely credited as one of the pioneers of the Korean Wave (Korean Hallyu) that first swept through Asia in the late 1990s, with the group reported to have sold over 200,000 albums in the country by 2001.

== History ==
=== 1996: Formation ===
Lee Sung-jin and Chun Myung-hoon originally debuted in 1996 as duet under the name HamoHamo and released one album with moderate success from the singles, "Papillion" and "Pangpang". Moon Sung-hoon and Noh Yoo-min originally backup dancers for HamoHamo. They were discovered by music producer Kim Tae-hyung (ko). Due to the success of the five-member idol group H.O.T, Kim Tae-hyung decided that they should become a four-member dance group. Kim Hwan-sung, who had previously been part of a quartet called Kkaebi Kkaebi and then a project group with Shoo of S.E.S. and Son Ho-young and Danny Ahn of g.o.d, was later added to the line-up.

=== 1997–1999: Debut, breakthrough and line-up changes ===
Lee Sung-jin announcing his and Myunghoon's departure from NRG.

NRG debuted on October 28, 1997, on the cable music program Music Tank (ko) with the single "I Can Do It" (할 수 있어). Two weeks after their debut, the group held an MC spot for ten weeks on the show. Their first album New Radiancy Group sold over 200,000 copies in South Korea. At the 1998 SBS Popular Song Awards, NRG won the New Face Award (Best Male New Artist). According to H.O.T members Moon Hee-joon and Tony An, they had initially considered NRG their professional rival rather than Sechs Kies as NRG introduced acrobatic stunts into their choreography, which was considered groundbreaking at that time.

NRG's second album Race was released that same year, and featured more high energy dance songs like "Messenger", selling over 300,000 copies in South Korea. With the second album, NRG was also able to find success outside of Korea, selling albums in both China and Japan. NRG became the first South Korean musical group to actively market themselves in China, where they have sold over 100,000 copies.

At a press conference on August 26, 1999, Sungjin and Myunghoon announced that they would be leaving the group, with Sungjin stating that their departures had nothing to do with "discord within the group", but that it was a voluntary decision by both. Sungjin pursued a career in acting and hosting, while Myunghoon took a less visible role in the group by choreographing their dance routines and writing and composing rather than performing. The group released their third album, NRG 003, on November 4, 1999, which struggled promotionally as a result of Sungjin and Myunghoon's absence. Later that month, the group also released their holiday album, a Kiss In Christmas.

=== 2000–2001: Kim Hwan-sung’s death, Sorrow, and temporary hiatus ===
On May 11, 2000, it was announced that NRG had accepted Yuxing Company's invitation to become "Fitness Dance Ambassadors" as part of their global expansion efforts. The following week, the group was spotted in Beijing shooting a commercial as part of the buildup to their first China tour, announced by member Hwansung at a press conference later that day.

Following the group's early promotions for the tour, Hwansung was admitted to the hospital on June 6, but his condition quickly deteriorated to the point where he was placed on life support on June 10, and fell into a coma the following day. On June 13, the group reportedly met to discuss the cancellation of the upcoming tour, but at the request of Hwansung's parents, the tour would continue as scheduled. Hwansung died in the early morning hours of June 15, 2000, from viral pneumonia. On June 23, it was announced that the group's tour of China would begin on July 14, with former members Sungjin and Myunghoon making their official return. During the first performance of the tour, the group debuted their new song "Antonio (Letter to Heaven)", written in memory of Hwansung.

On January 25, 2001, NRG and their labelmates T.T.Ma signed a contract with a Latvian concert performer to embark on a European tour in June, making them the first K-pop group to perform in Eastern Europe. On June 4, their fourth album Sorrow (悲) was released, with the title track written for them by former H.O.T. member Kangta. On August 17 and 19, NRG held their first concert in Korea, which also served as a tribute to Hwansung.

Following promotions for Sorrow, the group would become inactive during 2002 for what was reported to be a combination of Hwansung's death and poor sales of the group's fourth album, with Daum noting that the group became overshadowed by Sungjin's popularity as a television personality during their hiatus.

=== 2001–2005: Return with Hit Song, first number-one song, and New Radiancy 6 Group ===
1 year and six months after the release of Sorrow, NRG returned with their fifth album Hit Song in February 2003. The album accumulated over 300,000 pre-orders in China, and had sold 130,000 copies domestically by May. Its lead single, "Hit Song", earned the group their first ever #1 win on a music program—during the ceremony, the members dedicated their win to Kim Hwan-sung. The song "Forgiveness" also gained popularity, and the group promoted both it and "Hit Song" at once. They were also named in the Teen's Choice Top 10 Singers at the MBC Gayo Daejejeon (then the Top 10 Singer's Song Festival) music awards, where recordings of Hwansung accompanied their performance.

On April 30, 2004, NRG released their sixth album New Radiancy 6 Group. The title track, "Hurray for a Virile Son of Korea," was written and composed by Myunghoon for the 2004 Athens Olympics and placed 4th in the pop charts as the event neared. The following month, the group held a special performance for the Olympic athletes at the Taereung Athletics Village on May 19, in response to the title track's popularity among the athletes. As a result of Chosen by Coca-Cola, Sungjin and Sunghoon were selected as torch bearers for the Olympic torch relay.

Despite the popularity of "Hurray for a Virile Son of Korea", the group's sixth album did not do well in sales, perceived to be from the album's similarities to Hit Song, which underwhelmed the public.

=== 2005–2015: One of Five: Apart and Together and temporary disbandment ===
On September 29, 2005, NRG held a press conference to announce that they would be holding a "farewell concert", for their fans on October 27 at Xenia Club in Chaoyang, Beijing to say goodbye to their fans before their upcoming enlistment, though the group had promised they would not disband.

On October 16, Music Factory announced that NRG would be releasing their seventh album as a trio, noting that the album contained several duet and solo tracks in order to allow the group and members to continue promoting during the upcoming military period. In response to fans questioning Sunghoon's exclusion from the album, Music Factory announced on October 26 that Sunghoon had withdrawn from the group to pursue "an internet related business". The album, One of Five: Apart and Together, released on November 22, 2005, with the group brancing into more individual activities in 2006 as part of the album's concept. Their last known public appearance as a group was the February 18, 2006 episode of Show! Music Core.

In April of 2006, Myunghoon's TV appearances were suspended as a result of a legal battle with Music Factory regarding his contract, with Myunghoon settling and returning to the company on July 31. On July 20, it was belatedly reported that Sungjin had begun his mandatory military service as an industrial technician at a defense company the week prior. He would later withdraw from the group permanently as he was being investigated over a gambling scandal. Member Yoomin later stated in 2009 that he believed the group had "effectively disbanded" during their enlistment, and announced plans to "maintain the NRG brand" by reuniting with Myunghoon and returning to live broadcasts, though no group reunion would occur.

NRG's debut single "You Can Do It" was remade by the cast of Handsome Boys of the 20th Century and the new version charted on the Gaon Digital Chart.

=== 2016–2018, 2022: Reunions ===
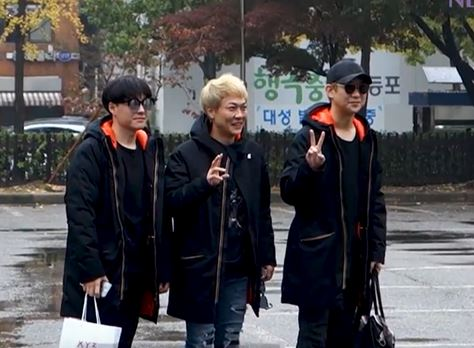
NRG on Music Bank in 2017.

On October 22, 2016, NRG held a fan meeting and announced that NRG would be getting back together with all the members except for Sunghoon, although they stayed in contact with him throughout the years. On September 27, 2017, it was announced NRG would participate in the 2017 Dream Concert, marking their first performance since their disbandment 11 years ago. On October 19, the first teaser images were revealed. One week later, it was revealed the track and the new album, 20th Century (20세기), were released under Genie Music. 20th Century charted in the Gaon Album Chart, peaking at #39.

In March 2018, Sunghoon joined the other NRG members on the talk show Video Star. It was the first time in thirteen years all four members were on television together and, for the first time in over fifteen years, publicly spoke about how Hwansung's death had affected them. Sungjin, Myunghoon, and Yoomin also appeared on the MBC documentary series Human Documentary: Good People (ko) and met up with Hwansung's parents.

On July 9, 2021, member Lee Sungjin stated that he did not believe NRG would reunite again, following his interview regarding past "negative experiences" with the group members, as well as internal disputes over ownership of the copyright of the group's name.

On February 13, 2022, Myunghoon announced he would be releasing a single titled "Never Going Back," which featured NRG members Yoomin and Sunghoon, as well as singer Lisa. Despite being released under his name, he billed the single as "his last song with NRG." The announcement also included a tribute to Hwansung, while Sungjin was notably not included or acknowledged.

== Members ==
- Lee Sung-jin (Hangul: 이성진) – leader, main vocalist (1997–1999; 2000–2006; 2017–2018)
- Chun Myung-hoon (Hangul: 천명훈) – lead vocalist, lead rapper, main dancer (1997–1999; 2000–2006; 2017–2018; 2022)
- Noh Yoo-min (Hangul: 노유민) – sub vocalist, lead dancer (1997–2006; 2017–2018; 2022)
- Moon Sung-hoon (Hangul: 문성훈) – main rapper (1997–2005; 2022)
- Kim Hwan-sung (Hangul: 김환성) – sub vocalist (1997–2000; his death)

== Discography ==
=== Studio albums ===
Title	Album details	Peak chart positions	Sales
Title	Album details	KOR	Sales
New Radiancy Group	Released: October 28, 1997; Label: Music Factory; Format: CD, cassette; Track listing: 1. Intro; 2. I Can Do It; 3. Smile; 4. Breakfast at Tiffan'ys; 5. See You at the Top; 6. Bad Kids; 7. The Judgement of the Ninja; 8. Island; 9. Your Country (Princess of the Stars); 10. Oh! Carol; 11. Winter Story; 12. I Can Do It (NRG Ver.); 13. Smile (Remix); 14. Mega	No data	No data
Race	Released: August 7, 1998; Label: Music Factory; Format: CD, cassette; Track listing: 1. Intro; 2. Messanger; 3. Making Love; 4. Marathon; 5. Flight No. 817; 6. Hey Ya; 7. Let's Go; 8. Dream; 9. Let's Be Together; 10. Making Love (remix); 11. Breakfast at Tiffany's (remix)	No data	No data
NRG 003	Released: November 4, 1999; Label: Music Factory; Format: CD, cassette; Track listing: 1. Prologue; 2. You! Me!; 3. Bump; 4. Handel; 5. Face; 6. Shadow; 7. Salvation; 8. Leave My Heart; 9. Betrayal; 10. Dark Angel; 11. Fresh Boy; 12. Salvation (remix)	13	KOR: 46,856+
Sorrow (悲)	Released: June 4, 2001; Label: Music Factory; Format: CD, cassette; Track listing: 1. Letter; 2. Fiance; 3. Sorrow; 4. Yearning; 5. Goodbye My Friend; 6. Boiled Eggs; 7. Do You Know; 8. Energy; 9. Love; 10. A Once in a Lifetime Opportunity; 11. Sunshine; 12. Forget; 13. Letter (Classic version); 14. Sorrow (Instrumental)	14	KOR: 49,689+
Hit Song	Released: February 7, 2003; Label: Music Factory; Format: CD, cassette; Track listing: 1. Forgiveness; 2. Friend; 3. Hit Song; 4. Day; 5. What Should I Do?; 6. Funk It Up; 7. Awkward Love; 8. Remember; 9. Oh Ah!; 10. I Can Run; 11. With Us; 12. On A Starry Night (Hit Song); 13. What Should I Do (Remix); 14. Forgiveness (Chinese ver.)	5	KOR: 142,042+
New Radiancy 6 Group	Released: April 30, 2004; Label: Music Factory; Format: CD, cassette; Track listing: 1. IOU; 2. Shoulder to Shoulder; 3. Hurray for a Virile Son of Korea; 4. Lollipop; 5. Loving You; 6. The Lament of the Wind and Trees; 7. Go Go; 8. Another One; 9. My Girl; 10. Look at Me; 11. Regret; 12. Boss; 13. Lollipop (Remix); 14. The Lament of the Wind and Trees (instrumental)	12	KOR: 35,117+
One of Five: Apart and Together	Released: November 22, 2005; Label: Music Factory; Format: CD, cassette; Track listing: 1. A Bonus Book; 2. The One; 3. Run! (Myunghoon solo); 4. Gift (harmony); 5. After I Send You Away (Yoomin solo); 6. Goodbye for a Moment (Sungjin solo); 7. Dr. DJ; 8. This is Driving Me Crazy!!!; 9. Shiny (Myunghoon solo); 10. Wish (Yoomin solo); 11. Like a Break...; 12. Goodbye for a Moment (instrumental)	—	—N/a

=== Compilation albums ===
Title	Album details	Peak chart positions	Sales
Title	Album details	KOR	Sales
Season's Greeting	Released: November 1, 1998; Label: Music Factory; Format: CD, cassette	No data	No data
Kiss In Christmas	Released: November 25, 1999; Label: Music Factory; Format: CD, cassette; Track listing: 1. Rudolph the Red-Nosed Reindeer; 2. Santa Clause is Comin' to Town; 3. Our Own World; 4. White Christmas; 5. Birthday Bell; 6. Silver Bells; 7. Jingle Bells; 8. Farewell; 9. Kiss in Christmas; 10. Silver Line; 11. Silent Night, Holy Night; 12. The Little Drummer Boy; 13. Silent Night, Holy Night (instrumental); 14. Farewell (instrumental)	—	—N/a

=== Live albums ===
Title	Album details	Peak chart positions	Sales
Title	Album details	KOR	Sales
2000 Live Concert In China	Released: September 6, 2000; Label: Music Factory; Format: CD, cassette	—	—N/a
1st Concert with Antonio	Released: October 30, 2001; Label: Music Factory; Format: CD, cassette	46	KOR: 7,699+

=== Extended plays ===
Title	Album details	Peak chart positions	Sales
Title	Album details	KOR	Sales
20th Century (20세기)	Released: October 28, 2017; Label: Music Factory; Formats: CD, digital download	39	KOR: 1,674+

=== Singles ===
Title	Year	Album
"I Can Do It" (할 수 있어)	1997	New Radiancy Group
"Breakfast at Tiffany's" (티파니에서 아침을)	1997	New Radiancy Group
"Making Love" (사랑만들기)	1998	Race
"Messenger"	1998	Race
"Our Own World" (우리만의 세상)	1998	Season's Greetings
"You! Me" (너! 나)	1999	NRG 003
"Face"	1999	NRG 003
"Antonio (Letter to Heaven)" (안토니오 (하늘로 보내는 편지))	2000	2000 Live Concert in China
"Sorrow" (비)	2001	Sorrow
"Boiled Egg" (삶은 계란)	2001	Sorrow
"Hit Song"	2003	Hit Song
"Friend" (친구)	2003	Hit Song
"One Day" (하루)	2003	Hit Song
"What Should I Do" (나 어떡해)	2003	Hit Song
"Hurray for a Virile Son of Korea" (대한건아 만세)	2004	New Radiancy 6 Group
"Shoulder to Shoulder" (어깨동무)	2004	New Radiancy 6 Group
"Lollipop" (롤리박)	2004	New Radiancy 6 Group
"Bonus Book" (별책부록)	2005	One of Five: Apart & Together
"20th Century Night" (20세기 나이트)	2017	20th Century
"On the Phone" (통화 중)	2018	Non-album single
"Go to the Pyeongchang" (Go to the 평창)	2018	Non-album single
"Never Going Back" (추어)	2022	Non-album single

== Awards and nominations ==
=== China National Radio's Korean Singer Awards ===
Year	Category	Work	Result
2004	Best Korean singer	NRG	Won

=== Golden Disc Awards ===
Year	Category	Work	Result
2003	Album Bonsang	Hit Song	Won

=== KMTV Korean Music Awards ===
Year	Category	Work	Result
2003	Singer of the Year Award	NRG	Won

=== Mnet Asian Music Awards ===
Year	Category	Work	Result
2001	Asian Viewers' Request Award	"Sorrow" (비)	Won
2003	Best Male Group	"Hit Song"	Nominated
2004	Best Male Group Video	"Hurray For A Virile Son Of Korea" (대한건아만세)	Nominated

=== SBS Gayo Daejeon ===
Year	Category	Work	Result
1998	Rookie Award	NRG	Won
2003	Main Prize (Bonsang)	NRG	Won

=== Seoul Music Awards ===
Year	Category	Work	Result
1998	New Artist Award	NRG	Won

== See also ==
- List of South Korean idol groups (1990s)
