= Moon Hee-joon =

South Korean singer-songwriter

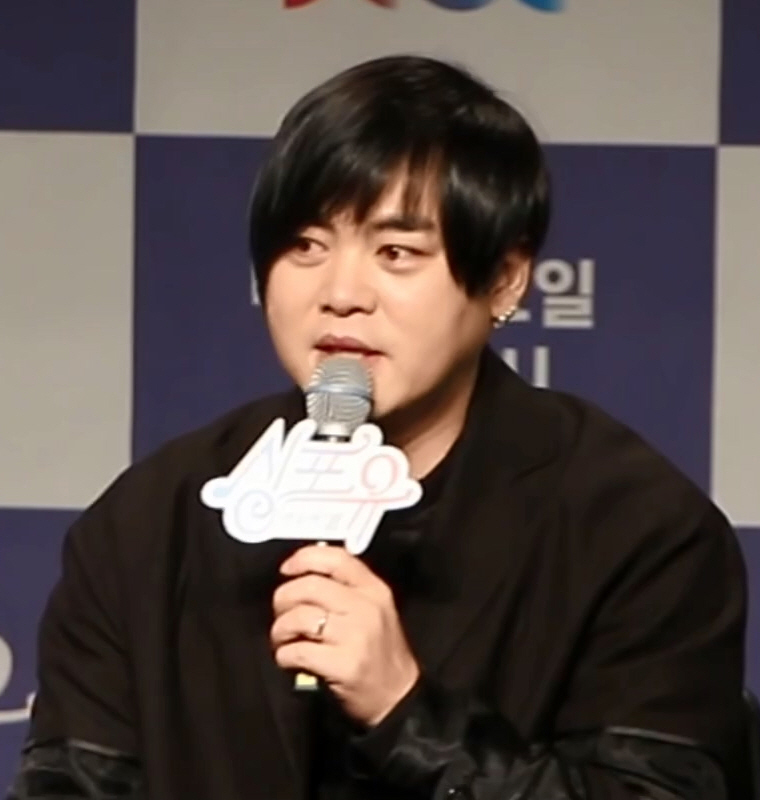
- Moon in 2016
- Born: March 14, 1978 (age 48); Gangnam District, Seoul, South Korea
- Occupations: Singer; songwriter; dancer; choreographer; TV host; composer
- Years active: 1996–present
- Spouse: Soyul (m. 2017)
- Children: 2
- Musical career
- Genres: Rock; pop
- Years active: 1996–present
- Label: IOK Company
- Formerly of: H.O.T., H.S.g.R.

Korean name
- Hangul: 문희준
- Hanja: 文熙畯
- RR: Mun Huijun
- MR: Mun Hŭijun

Moon Hee-jun (Korean: 문희준; born March 14, 1978) is a South Korean pop rock singer-songwriter and dancer signed under SidusHQ. He initially rose to fame as the leader of former boy band H.O.T. under SM Entertainment.

== Biography ==
=== 1996–2001: H.O.T. ===
Being the second member to join H.O.T. after auditioning, Moon made his debut as a singer as the leader of the boy group. The group debuted with their first album, We Hate All Kinds of Violence in September 1996, which was accused of being plagiarized and lawsuits were placed against them. Despite their controversial debut, the group eventually rose to fame with their first hit, Candy and We Are the Future, which the latter won them a MTV award for Best International Video. During his time as part of the group, Moon composed and wrote music for the group and with fellow member, Jang Woo-hyuk, he often choreographed the group's dance routine. Despite H.O.T.'s success, after releasing their last album, Outside Castle in September 2000, the group disbanded in May 2001.

=== 2001–2005: Solo artist and leaving S.M. Entertainment ===
After the disbandment of the group, Moon stayed on in SM Entertainment with Kangta, who was also part of H.O.T., and debuted as a solo artist. Moon attempted to establish a rock music career with his first album, Alone, but received criticism from the public. His second album, Messiah, was tinted with controversy as one of the songs, Media, was banned from all 3 major broadcasting stations in South Korea, for attacking mass media. After the release of his third album, Legend, in 2003, Moon released The Best: Soaring for a Dream, his last album under S.M. Entertainment and created his own company, PS Entertainment. After Moon released his fourth album, Triple X, he enlisted in the army in 2005.

=== 2006–2009: Military service, SidusHQ and comeback ===
Before entering the army, Moon had signed a contract with SidusHQ and during his time in the army, he hosted the KFN Korean Army Broadcast "Music Talk Show", which received recognition from various Korean artistes. In 2008, Moon released his fifth album, Special Album, which included songs from H.O.T. previous albums. Moon released his first mini album, Last Cry, in 2009. In the same year, Moon appeared in sitcom Taehee, Hyegyo, Jihyun and took a break from the music scene.

=== 2010–present: Other activities, Begins, HotSechgodRG ===
Despite being absent from the music scene, Moon took up hosting in several variety programs such as, Immortal Songs: Singing the Legend, Mnet's 'Wide Celebrity News' and other programs. In 2013, Moon released his second mini album, Begins, after being away from the music scene from 3 years. It was released on January 18, 2013.

Moon, his H.O.T. bandmate Tony An and three members of disbanded or inactive fellow first-generation idol groups Eun Ji-won of Sechs Kies, Danny Ahn of g.o.d and Chun Myung-hoon of NRG starred in their own variety-reality television show Handsome Boys of the 20th Century. He had conceived the idea following the success of Reply 1997 and invited the four other entertainers, all of whom were born in the same year (1978), to star in a reality version of the show. They called their "group" HOTSechgodRG, which is made up of each of their idol group names. They have since appeared on shows such as KBS's Happy Together SBS's Running Man. Due to the reuniting of Eun's group Sechs Kies and Danny Ahn's group g.o.d, they have not appeared as a five-some since the 2014 show Where is My Superhero?, which aired on OnStyle, due to busy schedules but remain close friends. The group, except Eun, most recently met at Moon's bachelor party which was shown on My Little Old Boy, the reality show that Tony An was participating in.

In 2015, Moon signed an exclusive contract with KOEN Stars.

== Personal life ==
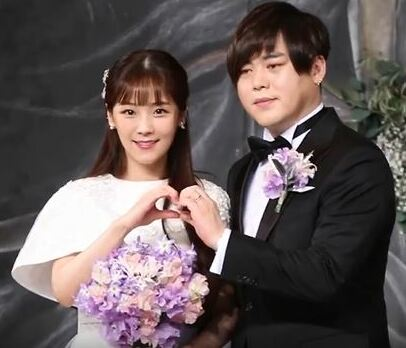
Park and Moon at the press conference of their wedding

On November 25, 2016, Moon announced that he would be marrying fellow entertainer Park Hye-Kyeong, also known as Soyul of Crayon Pop, who is 13 years his junior. The wedding was held on February 12, 2017, in Seoul. The pair then welcomed their first child, daughter Moon Hee-yul, on May 12, 2017. On February 5, 2022 the couple announced of their second pregnancy. Their second child, son Moon Heewoo was born on September 7, 2022.

== Discography ==
=== Studio albums ===
Title	Album details	Peak chart positions	Sales
Title	Album details	KOR RIAK	Sales
Alone	Released: October 5, 2001; Label: SM Entertainment; Formats: CD, cassette	1	KOR: 317,237
Messiah	Released: July 18, 2002; Label: SM Entertainment; Formats: CD, cassette	3	KOR: 171,652
Legend	Released: July 28, 2003; Label: SM Entertainment; Formats: CD, cassette	3	KOR: 58,835
Triple X	Released: September 20, 2005; Label: PS Entertainment; Formats: CD, cassette	10	KOR: 27,656

=== Other albums ===
Title	Album details	Peak chart positions		Sales
Title	Album details	KOR RIAK	KOR Gaon	Sales
Live Revolution	Released: December 9, 2002; Label: SM Entertainment; Formats: CD, cassette	—	—N/a	
Best: A Soaring For Dream	Released: April 28, 2004; Label: SM Entertainment; Formats: CD	21	—N/a	KOR:13,316
Special Album	Released: March 18, 2008; Label: IHQ; Formats: CD	7	—N/a	KOR: 8,790
20th Anniversary	Released: November 12, 2016; Label: Interpark; Formats: CD, digital download	—N/a	15	KOR: 2,331
"—" denotes releases that did not chart or were not released in that region.

=== Extended plays ===
Title	Album details	Peak chart positions		Sales
Title	Album details	KOR RIAK	KOR Gaon	Sales
Last Cry	Released: June 18, 2009; Label: IHQ; Formats: CD, digital download	—N/a	—N/a	
Begins	Released: January 18, 2013; Label: Line Entertainment; Formats: CD, digital download	—N/a	8	KOR: 4,593
"—" denotes releases that did not chart or were not released in that region.

=== Singles ===
Title	Year	Peak chart positions	Sales	Album
Title	Year	KOR Gaon	Sales	Album
"Alone"	2001	—		Alone
"Generous" (아낌없이 주는 나무)	2002	—		Messiah
"Silent Conflict" (G.선상의 아리아)	2003	—		Legend
"Love Letter"	2004	—	KOR (Physical): 8,037	Winter Letter (single)
"A Small Village Called Memory" (기억이란 작은 마을)	2005	—		Triple X
"Obsession"	2008	—		Special Album
"Toy"	2009	—		Last Cry
"Scandal" (스캔들)	2013	—		Begins
"I'm Not OK"	2013	68	KOR (Digital): 32,302	Begins
"—" denotes releases that did not chart or were not released in that region.

== Filmography ==
=== Television series ===
Year	Title	Role
2009	Hilarious Housewives	Moon Hee-joon

=== Variety shows ===
Year	Title	Episode
2011–2020	Immortal Songs: Singing the Legend	Co-host (Waiting Room)
2013	Handsome Boys of the 20th Century	Main cast
2014	Where is My Superhero?	Main cast
2016–2017	Singderella	Co-host
2019–2020	The Return of Superman	Father of JamJam
2023	Oh Eun-young Game	judge

== Awards and nominations ==
Name of the award ceremony, year presented, category, nominee of the award, and the result of the nomination
Award ceremony	Year	Category	Nominated work	Result	Ref.
KBS Entertainment Awards	2018	Top Excellence Award – Talk/Show Category	Immortal Songs: Singing the Legend	Won	
KBS Entertainment Awards	2019	Grand Prize (Daesang)	The Return of Superman	Won	
KMTV Korean Music Awards	2001	Bonsang	Moon Hee-joon	Won	
KMTV Korean Music Awards	2001	IF Award	Moon Hee-joon	Won	
KMTV Korean Music Awards	2002	Bonsang	Moon Hee-joon	Won	
KMTV Korean Music Awards	2002	Nate Award	Moon Hee-joon	Won	
KMTV Korean Music Awards	2003	Bonsang	Moon Hee-joon	Won	
KMTV Korean Music Awards	2003	Audience Popularity Award	Moon Hee-joon	Won	
Mnet Asian Music Awards	2001	Best Male Artist	"Alone"	Nominated	
Mnet Asian Music Awards	2002	Best Male Artist	"Generous" (아낌없이 주는 나무)	Nominated	
Mnet Asian Music Awards	2002	Netizen Popularity Award	"Generous" (아낌없이 주는 나무)	Won	
Mnet Asian Music Awards	2003	Best Rock Performance	"My Silent Conflict" (G 선상의 아리아)	Nominated	
Mnet Asian Music Awards	2004	Best Rock Video	"Paper Airplane"	Nominated	
Mnet Asian Music Awards	2004	Blue Award	"Paper Airplane"	Won	
Mnet Asian Music Awards	2005	Best Rock Performance	"A Small Village Called Memories"	Nominated	
Mnet Asian Music Awards	2005	Gmarket Netizen Popularity Award	"A Small Village Called Memories"	Won	
Mnet Asian Music Awards	2008	Best Rock Performance	"Obsession"	Nominated	
