= Love...Painfully =

Studio album by J-Walk
- Released: 12 December 2013
- Genre: Ballad K-Pop
- Label: A&G Modes

J-Walk chronology
첫눈오는 날 (First Snow)(Digital Single) (2013)	Love...Painfully (2013)	무슨말이 필요해 (What More Can I Say) (Digital Single) (2014)

Love...Painfully is a mini album by Korean duo male group J-Walk after they were discharged from army. This mini album is also J-Walk's comeback album under A&G Modes after five years. Love...Painfully featured a new song, "애써" ("Painfully"). Also included are two previous digital singles: "첫눈오는 날" ("First Snow") and "프라프치노" ("Frappuccino").

J-Walk released "첫눈오는 날" ("First Snow") on the November 27 previewing their upcoming winter comeback and had come back stage on the December 5 broadcast of Mnet’s M! Countdown. On the December 4, They released the video teaser for their main track “Strive” from their upcoming mini-album, “Love…Painfully.” “Strive” features zizo and Bumkey and will be a more dramatic ballad than “First Day of Snow.” The music video for this breaking up song will star J-Walk’s Jwang Soo Won and actress Cheon Lee Seul. The music video for main track “Strive” and the four track mini album “Love…Painfully” released on December 12.

== Track listing ==
No.	Title	Lyrics	Music	Length
1.	"첫눈오는 날 (First Snow)"	이레(Jireh)	김세진, 박찬	4:04
2.	"너만 있으면 (If Only You)"	이결, 양승욱	양승욱	3:57
3.	"애써 (Painfully) (Feat.지조 (Zizo), Hook by Bumkey)"	범키, 지조(Zizo)	이병호	3:31
4.	"프라프치노 (Frappuccino) (Feat. 팀버 (Timber))"	물만난물고기, 다빈	물만난물고기	3:27
5.	"애써 (Painfully) (Inst.)"	범키, 이병호	이병호	3:31
Total length:				18:30
