= Fantastic Duo =

South Korean television series

- Also known as: Good Sunday - Fantastic Duo
- Genre: Music-reality show
- Written by: Mo Eun-seol
- Directed by: Kim Young-wook; Kim Jeong-wook
- Presented by: Jun Hyun-moo; Kim Bum-soo; Kim Jun-hyun
- Country of origin: South Korea
- Original language: Korean
- No. of seasons: 2
- No. of episodes: 67 + 1 special

Production
- Producer: Kim Youngwook
- Running time: 100 minutes
- Production company: SBS Entertainment

Original release
- Network: SBS
- Release: February 9, 2016 – December 17, 2017

Related
- Good Sunday

Fantastic Duo (Korean: 판타스틱 듀오) was a South Korean television show where fans can sing a duet with their favorite singer using their cell phones. This show is currently hosted by Jun Hyun-moo, Kim Bum-soo and Kim Jun-hyun. It airs on SBS every Sunday at 16:50 (KST) beginning April 17, 2016; forming part of SBS's Good Sunday lineup. There were 30 episodes aired during Season 1, which ended on November 20, 2016.

Season 2 broadcast every Sundays at 18:30 (KST) starting March 26, 2017, after Running Man. On October 26, Fantastic Duo production team announced that season 2 would be end after the last recording on November 7, whose the last regular episode was aired on December 10. A special episode titled "Fantastic Memory" was aired on December 17, 2017.

== Format ==
=== Season 1 ===
In each episode, 3–4 Korean singers will compete each other in order to find and be the "Fantastic Duo". Through the singing application "everySing", 5–10 runners-up from ordinary people were selected and from there, 3 contestants were selected and will appear in the show. The contestants later compete with each other in "1:3 Random Competition" (details below), where the singers would choose one of the 3 contestants to be his/her "Fantastic Duo". Later a final performance will be conducted, and the duo which received the highest votes out of 300 audiences will be crowned as the winner. The songs will be officially released as a single, and will be given the copyright that is protected by the Korean Law, and the copyright will be maintained for the next 70 years. To ensure for the contestants to earn the royalty, the broadcasting company, SBS, will register the contestants to the Federation of Korean Music Performers, where they will automatically given the privilege of a singer. The winning duo will earn $10,000 (Ten thousand dollars) for every win, with a maximum of five wins.

==== 1:3 Random Competition ====
The 3 contestants will go up to the stage and will sing a singer's song. The contestants can only sing when their light comes up, with the light comes up randomly. The singer sing the song's first verse. After the performance ended, the singer will personally shut down the contestants light, the contestant with his/her light still comes up became the singers "Fantastic Duo"

In several episodes, there would be a "First Impression Medley" section which allows the singers to see the contestants abilities and help them to choose his/her duo.

==== Panelists ====
In every episode, there would be a group of panelists that act as co-hosts, judges and commentators which could help the singer to choose his/her duo.

=== Season 2 ===
In season 2, the rules have been modified so now it features 2 (or 3) singers, each with their own panelists and sub-MC's in a team-styled match.

==== Episodes 1–6 ====
Through the application "EverySing", 6 candidates will be chosen and from there, 3 contestants will appear in the show (for each singer). The last contestant (of the total of 7) is selected from those who already have appeared in the show whom the audience wants to see again.

The 7 contestants will face the preliminary round, 1:7 Match, where each singer have to choose 3 out of 7 contestants, regardless of which singer the contestants were auditioned for (For example, a contestant who auditioned for singer A can be chosen by singer B as his/her top 3). In cases that a contestant was chosen as the top 3 by both singers, the contestant will choose the singer themselves. The contestants who doesn't get chosen from both singers will be eliminated. The remaining contestants (for each singer) will go into the standard 1:3 Random Competition, where in the end the last remaining contestant will be his/her Fantastic Duo. The singer with their chosen contestants will go to the final round, where the duo with the most votes out of 200 will be the "Fantastic Duo".

==== Episodes 7–present ====
Through the application "EverySing", 8 candidates will be chosen, and from there, 5 contestants will appear in the show. The contestants will enter the 1:5 Match, where the singer will choose 3 out of 5 contestants. The contestants who doesn't get chosen from the singer will be eliminated. The remaining contestants will go into the standard 1:3 Random Competition where the last remaining contestant will be his/her Fantastic Duo. The singer with their chosen contestants will go to the final round, where the duo with the most votes out of 200 will be the "Fantastic Duo".

In the season finale of Fantastic Duo 2, "The King of the Kings" special, the winner will be given a sedan/car as a reward.

==== 1:7 Match ====
All 7 contestants were revealed, either those who auditioned for the singer, the other singer, or the fan favorites from Season 1, will face the 1:7 Match. The rules are similar to the 1:3 Random Competition. 3 out of 7 contestants will be chosen by the singers to move on to the 1:3 Random Competition.

==== 1:5 Match ====
All 5 contestants will face the 1:5 Match. The rules are similar to the 1:3 Random Competition. 3 out of 5 contestants will be chosen by the singers to move on to the 1:3 Random Competition.

In Season 2, the 1:3 Random Competition is slightly simplified, in which the singer would no longer needed to shut down the lights to choose his/her Fantastic Duo, but rather announcing his/her Fantastic Duo directly after a 5-second countdown.

== Cast ==
=== Season 1 ===
Host

- Jun Hyun-moo
- Kim Soo-ro (Pilot)

Regular panelist

- Yoon Sang
- Park Myeong-su
- Seo Jang-hoon
- Jang Yun-jeong
- Han Hee-jun

=== Season 2 ===
Host

- Jun Hyun-moo
- Lee So-ra (Co-host, episodes 1–6)
- Kim Bum-soo (Co-host/Panel team leader)
- Kim Jun-hyun (Co-host/Panel team leader)

Regular panelist

- Jang Yun-jeong
- Bada
- Yang Yo-seob (HIGHLIGHT)
- DinDin
- Kim Eana
- Yoon Il-sang

== List of guests and results ( Season 1 ) ==
Note: the section labeled in gold is the winner

=== Season 1 ===
List of episodes in Season 1

==== List of Episodes ====
Episode # (Air Date)	Panel	Final Stage Order	Main Guest	1:3 Random Competition	Guest's Final Choice	Final Duo Song	Score /300
Pilot (February 9, 2016)	Yoon Sang, Seo Jang-hoon, Yoon Jung-soo, Kim Sook, Kang Kyun-sung (Noel), Yoo Jae-hwan, Lovelyz (Kei, Sujeong)	1	Park Myeong-soo	"Gwangyang Gugak Sisters" Lee Yeon-hwa & Lee Myung-hak, "British Man" Aancod, "Possaem" Moon Joon-cheol & Kim Hang-sung & Shin Dong-yeol & Jo Tae-hee Song: Naengmyeon (냉면)	Moon Joon-cheol & Kim Hang-sung & Shin Dong-yeol & Jo Tae-hee	From Fool to Fool (바보에게 바보가)	127
Pilot (February 9, 2016)	Yoon Sang, Seo Jang-hoon, Yoon Jung-soo, Kim Sook, Kang Kyun-sung (Noel), Yoo Jae-hwan, Lovelyz (Kei, Sujeong)	2	Jang Yun-jeong	"Sincere Vocalist" Lee Seung-hoon, "Dinner King Director Seo" Seo Joon-ryeol, "70s Taxi Driver" Seo Byung-soon Song: I Like You (당신이 좋아)	Seo Byung-soon	First Marriage (초혼)	262
Pilot (February 9, 2016)	Yoon Sang, Seo Jang-hoon, Yoon Jung-soo, Kim Sook, Kang Kyun-sung (Noel), Yoo Jae-hwan, Lovelyz (Kei, Sujeong)	3	Im Chang-jung	"Delivery the Max" Lee Gwang-dong, "30s Box" Min Jin-sung & Kim Ji-hyun, "Daegu Tone-deaf Firefighter" Jang Il-hyun Song: Love Again (또 다시 사랑)	Lee Gwang-dong	A Shot of Soju (소주 한잔)	275
Pilot (February 9, 2016)	Yoon Sang, Seo Jang-hoon, Yoon Jung-soo, Kim Sook, Kang Kyun-sung (Noel), Yoo Jae-hwan, Lovelyz (Kei, Sujeong)	4	Kim Bum-soo	"Wangsimni Bikini Girl" Park Hyun-joo, "Sacheon Fishcake Girl" Kim Da-mi, "Cheonan Kim Bam-soo" Kwak Ho-min Song: Appear (나타나)	Kim Da-mi	Last Love (끝사랑)	277
1–2 (April 17, 2016) (April 24, 2016) (Note: Special appearances via video by Park Na-rae, Red Velvet (Wendy, Joy) and Soyeon (Laboum) on episode 1; Winner on episode 2.)	Yoon Sang, Park Myeong-su, Seo Jang-hoon, Jang Yun-jeong, Han Hee-jun, Noh Sa-yeon, Kim Hwan, Kyuhyun (Super Junior), Seungyoon (Winner), Laboum (ZN, Solbin)	Special	Song Chang-sik (via video) & Lee Sun-hee			We Are (우리는)	
1–2 (April 17, 2016) (April 24, 2016)	Yoon Sang, Park Myeong-su, Seo Jang-hoon, Jang Yun-jeong, Han Hee-jun, Noh Sa-yeon, Kim Hwan, Kyuhyun (Super Junior), Seungyoon (Winner), Laboum (ZN, Solbin)	Special	Lee Sun-hee & Kyuhyun (Super Junior)			Fate (인연)	
1–2 (April 17, 2016) (April 24, 2016)	Yoon Sang, Park Myeong-su, Seo Jang-hoon, Jang Yun-jeong, Han Hee-jun, Noh Sa-yeon, Kim Hwan, Kyuhyun (Super Junior), Seungyoon (Winner), Laboum (ZN, Solbin)	1	Im Chang-jung	"Wedding Gummy" Joo Seol-ok, "3 Dan High Notes Master Seol" Seol Min-ji, "Yonsei University Dentistry Goddess" Lee Ye-ji Song: A Guy Like Me (나란 놈이란)	Joo Seol-ok	Again (그때 또 다시)	272
1–2 (April 17, 2016) (April 24, 2016)	Yoon Sang, Park Myeong-su, Seo Jang-hoon, Jang Yun-jeong, Han Hee-jun, Noh Sa-yeon, Kim Hwan, Kyuhyun (Super Junior), Seungyoon (Winner), Laboum (ZN, Solbin)	2	Taeyang	"Indonesia Bebe" Julia, "Bank Clerk Big Bang" Kim Sung-gyu & Song Won-ho, "Daejeon Rhythm Gangster" Lee Seo-jin Song: Loser (Original: Big Bang)	Lee Seo-jin	Eyes, Nose, Lips (눈,코,입)	289
1–2 (April 17, 2016) (April 24, 2016)	Yoon Sang, Park Myeong-su, Seo Jang-hoon, Jang Yun-jeong, Han Hee-jun, Noh Sa-yeon, Kim Hwan, Kyuhyun (Super Junior), Seungyoon (Winner), Laboum (ZN, Solbin)	3	Lee Sun-hee	"Sweet 18-year-old Lady Ye-jin" Kim Ye-jin, "Samcheonpo Gemstone" Kim Sung-beom, "Haman Sunny" Jeon Seon-hee Song: Meet Him Among Them (그 중에 그대를 만나)	Kim Ye-jin	I Always Miss You (나 항상 그대를)	291
1–2 (April 17, 2016) (April 24, 2016)	Yoon Sang, Park Myeong-su, Seo Jang-hoon, Jang Yun-jeong, Han Hee-jun, Noh Sa-yeon, Kim Hwan, Kyuhyun (Super Junior), Seungyoon (Winner), Laboum (ZN, Solbin)	4	Kim Bum-soo	(see in the previous episodes)	Kim Da-mi	I Miss You (보고싶다)	289
3–4 (May 1, 2016) (May 8, 2016) (Note: Special appearance via video by Haha on episode 3.)	Yoon Sang, Park Myeong-su, Seo Jang-hoon, Jang Yun-jeong, Han Hee-jun, Yoo Jae-hwan, Kim Ji-min, Lee Se-young, Hani (EXID), Kim Da-mi (Kim Bum-soo's fantastic duo)	Opening	Lee Sun-hee & "Sweet 18-year-old Lady Ye-jin" Kim Ye-jin			I Always Miss You (나 항상 그대를)	
3–4 (May 1, 2016) (May 8, 2016)	Yoon Sang, Park Myeong-su, Seo Jang-hoon, Jang Yun-jeong, Han Hee-jun, Yoo Jae-hwan, Kim Ji-min, Lee Se-young, Hani (EXID), Kim Da-mi (Kim Bum-soo's fantastic duo)	Special	Lee Sun-hee & Byun Jin-sub			All I Can Give You Is Love (네게 줄 수 있는 건 오직 사랑뿐) (Reply 1988 OST)	
3–4 (May 1, 2016) (May 8, 2016)	Yoon Sang, Park Myeong-su, Seo Jang-hoon, Jang Yun-jeong, Han Hee-jun, Yoo Jae-hwan, Kim Ji-min, Lee Se-young, Hani (EXID), Kim Da-mi (Kim Bum-soo's fantastic duo)	1	Jo Sung-mo	"Samcheonpo Burger Prince" Ryoo Yong-hyun, "Jamsil Macho Mechanic" Ahn Il-han, "Incheon Hair-clipper" Han Jae-heon Song: Forbidden Love (불멸의 사랑)	Ryoo Yong-hyun	To Your Side (너의 곁으로) (Lovers in Paris OST)	287
3–4 (May 1, 2016) (May 8, 2016)	Yoon Sang, Park Myeong-su, Seo Jang-hoon, Jang Yun-jeong, Han Hee-jun, Yoo Jae-hwan, Kim Ji-min, Lee Se-young, Hani (EXID), Kim Da-mi (Kim Bum-soo's fantastic duo)	2	Exo (Note: Appeared and performed by Suho, Xiumin, Baekhyun, Chen, Chanyeol and D.O.)	"Seongnae-dong Downtown Girls" Kim Da-young & Lee Bo-rim & Kim Chan-young & Yoon Jae-hee, "Jeolla-do Red Pants" Ahn Eun-bi, "Ttukseom Boys" David Oh & Jack Holmes Song: Growl (으르렁)	Ahn Eun-bi	Love Me Right	279
3–4 (May 1, 2016) (May 8, 2016)	Yoon Sang, Park Myeong-su, Seo Jang-hoon, Jang Yun-jeong, Han Hee-jun, Yoo Jae-hwan, Kim Ji-min, Lee Se-young, Hani (EXID), Kim Da-mi (Kim Bum-soo's fantastic duo)	3	Byun Jin-sub	"Perfect Harmony" Woo Je-hoon & Park Cho-hee, "Kim Bum-soo's Church Friend" Oh Hyun-seung, "Twang Soldier President" Kim Na-hee Song: Dear My Lady (숙녀에게)	Woo Je-hoon & Park Cho-hee	To You Again (너에게로 또 다시)	281
3–4 (May 1, 2016) (May 8, 2016)	Yoon Sang, Park Myeong-su, Seo Jang-hoon, Jang Yun-jeong, Han Hee-jun, Yoo Jae-hwan, Kim Ji-min, Lee Se-young, Hani (EXID), Kim Da-mi (Kim Bum-soo's fantastic duo)	4	Lee Sun-hee	(see in the previous episodes)	Kim Ye-jin	Turning the Pages of Memories (추억의 책장을 넘기며)	291
5–6 (May 15, 2016) (May 22, 2016) (Note: Special appearances via video by Cha Tae-hyun, Kim Min-jong and Younha on episode 5; Lee Ha-nui, Jisook (Rainbow), Seo In-young and Jang Hye-jin's daughter on episode 6.)	Yoon Sang, Park Myeong-su, Seo Jang-hoon, Jang Yun-jeong, Han Hee-jun, Lee Se-young, Kim Ji-woo, Sam Okyere, Apink (Kim Nam-joo, Oh Ha-young)	Special	Late Kim Hyun-sik (via voice and image) & Shin Seung-hun			The Covered Up Road (가리워진 길) (Original: Yoo Jae-ha)	
5–6 (May 15, 2016) (May 22, 2016)	Yoon Sang, Park Myeong-su, Seo Jang-hoon, Jang Yun-jeong, Han Hee-jun, Lee Se-young, Kim Ji-woo, Sam Okyere, Apink (Kim Nam-joo, Oh Ha-young)	1	Ailee	"Dancing Busan Bank Teller" Park Hye-jin, "Bukhansan Freshwater Eel Girl" Kim Sae-ha, "Achasan Ice Cream Girl" Lee Min-jeong Song: I Will Show You (보여줄게)	Lee Min-jeong	Heaven	262
5–6 (May 15, 2016) (May 22, 2016)	Yoon Sang, Park Myeong-su, Seo Jang-hoon, Jang Yun-jeong, Han Hee-jun, Lee Se-young, Kim Ji-woo, Sam Okyere, Apink (Kim Nam-joo, Oh Ha-young)	2	Jang Hye-jin	"Honey's Manager Hwan-i" Lee Jae-hwan, "Haeundae Bob cut" Kang Min-sung & Seo Jang-ho, "Jang Hye-jin's First Disciple" Yang Eun-kyung Song: Beautiful Days (아름다운 날들)	Kang Min-sung & Seo Jang-ho	One Late Night in 1994 (1994년 어느 늦은 밤)	260
5–6 (May 15, 2016) (May 22, 2016)	Yoon Sang, Park Myeong-su, Seo Jang-hoon, Jang Yun-jeong, Han Hee-jun, Lee Se-young, Kim Ji-woo, Sam Okyere, Apink (Kim Nam-joo, Oh Ha-young)	3	Shin Seung-hun	"Engineer Music Girl" Seok In-hye, "Yeonnam-dong Jewelry Girl" Ryoo Hyun-ji, "Jayang-dong Fun Missionary" Kim Han-na Song: I Believe	Seok In-hye	Somewhere Only a Little Above Me (나보다 조금 더 높은 곳에 니가 있을 뿐)	271
5–6 (May 15, 2016) (May 22, 2016)	Yoon Sang, Park Myeong-su, Seo Jang-hoon, Jang Yun-jeong, Han Hee-jun, Lee Se-young, Kim Ji-woo, Sam Okyere, Apink (Kim Nam-joo, Oh Ha-young)	4	Lee Sun-hee	(see in the previous episodes)	Kim Ye-jin	A Parting (이별) (Original: Patti Kim)	287
7–8 (May 29, 2016) (June 5, 2016) (Note: Special appearances via video by Kim Jun-hyun on episode 7; Jo Se-ho on episode 8.)	Yoon Sang, Park Myeong-su, Seo Jang-hoon, Jang Yun-jeong, Han Hee-jun, Kim Ji-woo, Kim Ji-min, Yoo Jae-hwan, Lee Se-young, Lee Yeon-bok, Hello Venus (Nara, Yeoreum)	Special	Kim Soo-hee & Tiger JK (ft. Bizzy)			I Want You (난 널 원해) (Original: Drunken Tiger)	
7–8 (May 29, 2016) (June 5, 2016)	Yoon Sang, Park Myeong-su, Seo Jang-hoon, Jang Yun-jeong, Han Hee-jun, Kim Ji-woo, Kim Ji-min, Yoo Jae-hwan, Lee Se-young, Lee Yeon-bok, Hello Venus (Nara, Yeoreum)	1	Kim Soo-hee	"Hwang Family's Fun Sisters" Hwangbo Ra-mi & Hwangbo Seul-yi, "Kkachisan Coffee Prince" Oh Chi-young, "Mudeungsan Victory's Goddess" Kim Malk-eum Song: Southbound Train (남행열차)	Oh Chi-young	Too Much (너무합니다)	273
7–8 (May 29, 2016) (June 5, 2016)	Yoon Sang, Park Myeong-su, Seo Jang-hoon, Jang Yun-jeong, Han Hee-jun, Kim Ji-woo, Kim Ji-min, Yoo Jae-hwan, Lee Se-young, Lee Yeon-bok, Hello Venus (Nara, Yeoreum)	2	Wheesung	"Super Daddy Ji-hwan's Dad" Kim Byung-hee, "Yangjae-dong Nursing's God" Park Sang-wook, "Folk Village's Fan Tradesman" Shin Dong-hyuk Song: Heartsore Story (가슴 시린 이야기)	Kim Byung-hee	Can't We (..안되나요...)	266
7–8 (May 29, 2016) (June 5, 2016)	Yoon Sang, Park Myeong-su, Seo Jang-hoon, Jang Yun-jeong, Han Hee-jun, Kim Ji-woo, Kim Ji-min, Yoo Jae-hwan, Lee Se-young, Lee Yeon-bok, Hello Venus (Nara, Yeoreum)	3	Vibe	"Wangsimni Call Center" Hwang Ha-ram, "57th Company's Cooking Sergeant Lee" Lee Ye-joon, "Bukhansan Freshwater Eel Girl" Kim Sae-ha (Note: She was one of Ailee's Top 3 in the previous episodes but she was eliminated after the "1:3 Random Competition" although her incredible singing skills. She has returned again as a new challenger for Vibe's fantastic duo and in this try, she has become their last choice.) Song: Drinking (술이야)	Kim Sae-ha	Love Me Once Again (미워도 다시 한 번)	270
7–8 (May 29, 2016) (June 5, 2016)	Yoon Sang, Park Myeong-su, Seo Jang-hoon, Jang Yun-jeong, Han Hee-jun, Kim Ji-woo, Kim Ji-min, Yoo Jae-hwan, Lee Se-young, Lee Yeon-bok, Hello Venus (Nara, Yeoreum)	4	Lee Sun-hee	(see in the previous episodes)	Kim Ye-jin	I Want to Know (알고싶어요)	287
9–10 (June 12, 2016) (June 19, 2016) (Note: Special appearances via video by Kangta, Heechul (Super Junior), Kim Min-jong's manager, Jang Hye-jin's fantastic duo "Haeundae Bob Cut" (Kang Min-sung & Seo Jang-ho), Ahn Jung-hwan and Wheesung on episode 9; Lee Soo-geun, AweSome Baby and Kim Jong-min (Koyote) on episode 10.)	Yoon Sang, Park Myeong-su, Seo Jang-hoon, Jang Yun-jeong, Han Hee-jun, Yoo Jae-hwan, Kim Won-jun, Lee Hoon, Kim Sae-rom, Lee Hi	Special	Yoon Sang & Vibe			Between Hidden Time (가려진 시간 사이로)	
9–10 (June 12, 2016) (June 19, 2016)	Yoon Sang, Park Myeong-su, Seo Jang-hoon, Jang Yun-jeong, Han Hee-jun, Yoo Jae-hwan, Kim Won-jun, Lee Hoon, Kim Sae-rom, Lee Hi	1	Kim Min-jong	"Suyu-ri All About Rock" Jo Yong-joo, "I'm Kim Min-jong at Home" Baek Seok-jae, "Hongcheon Sheep Dad" Jung Yoon-chang Song: Sincere Love (착한 사랑)	Jung Yoon-chang	Feeling Only You (너만을 느끼며) (Original: The Blue)	261
9–10 (June 12, 2016) (June 19, 2016)	Yoon Sang, Park Myeong-su, Seo Jang-hoon, Jang Yun-jeong, Han Hee-jun, Yoo Jae-hwan, Kim Won-jun, Lee Hoon, Kim Sae-rom, Lee Hi	2	Sechs Kies (Note: Appeared and performed by Eun Ji-won, Lee Jai-jin, Kang Sung-hoon and Kim Jae-duck.)	"Running Ms Han" Han Gyu-mi, "Love Sechs Kies for 30 Days" Seo Hyun-ji, "Following Mom to Sechs Kies" Song Jeong-moon & Jung Han-gyeol Song: Couple (커플)	Song Jeong-moon & Jung Han-gyeol	Will You Remember (기억해줄래)	277
9–10 (June 12, 2016) (June 19, 2016)	Yoon Sang, Park Myeong-su, Seo Jang-hoon, Jang Yun-jeong, Han Hee-jun, Yoo Jae-hwan, Kim Won-jun, Lee Hoon, Kim Sae-rom, Lee Hi	3	Vibe	"Baekban Restaurant's Matilda" Kyung Sang-eun, "Entertainer Donut" Oh Go-eun, "14-year-old High-pitched Captain" Yoon Min-seo Song: Are You Crazy? (미친거니)	Yoon Min-seo	Come Back to Me Again (다시 와주라)	288
9–10 (June 12, 2016) (June 19, 2016)	Yoon Sang, Park Myeong-su, Seo Jang-hoon, Jang Yun-jeong, Han Hee-jun, Yoo Jae-hwan, Kim Won-jun, Lee Hoon, Kim Sae-rom, Lee Hi	4	Lee Sun-hee	(see in the previous episodes)	Kim Ye-jin	Beautiful Country (아름다운 강산)	291
11–12 (June 26, 2016) (July 3, 2016) (Note: Special appearances via video by Minah (Girl's Day), Son Hoyoung (g.o.d) and Brian (Fly to the Sky) on episode 11.)	Yoon Sang, Park Myeong-su, Seo Jang-hoon, Jang Yun-jeong, Han Hee-jun, Yoo Jae-hwan, Kim Sae-rom, Nam Jin, Kim Heung-gook, Ahn Moon-sook, Hong Seok-cheon, Danny Ahn (g.o.d), Dana, MYNAME (In-soo, Se-yong)	Special	Nam Jin & Jang Yun-jeong			Brokenhearted (가슴 아프게)	
11–12 (June 26, 2016) (July 3, 2016)	Yoon Sang, Park Myeong-su, Seo Jang-hoon, Jang Yun-jeong, Han Hee-jun, Yoo Jae-hwan, Kim Sae-rom, Nam Jin, Kim Heung-gook, Ahn Moon-sook, Hong Seok-cheon, Danny Ahn (g.o.d), Dana, MYNAME (In-soo, Se-yong)	Special	Nam Jin	"Apgujeong Honey Voice" Hwanhee, "Bundang Nightingale" Lee Soo-young, "Sinsa-dong Bear" Kim Tae-woo Song: Nest (둥지)	Kim Tae-woo	Empty Glass (빈잔)	
11–12 (June 26, 2016) (July 3, 2016)	Yoon Sang, Park Myeong-su, Seo Jang-hoon, Jang Yun-jeong, Han Hee-jun, Yoo Jae-hwan, Kim Sae-rom, Nam Jin, Kim Heung-gook, Ahn Moon-sook, Hong Seok-cheon, Danny Ahn (g.o.d), Dana, MYNAME (In-soo, Se-yong)	1	Kim Tae-woo	"Dongdaemun Good Son Hong-i" Joo Jin-hong, "Wolmido Little Giant" Park Joo-hyun, "Bupyeong Part-time Goddess" Seo Ye-rim Song: Love Rain (사랑비)	Park Joo-hyun	Road (길) (Original: g.o.d)	287
11–12 (June 26, 2016) (July 3, 2016)	Yoon Sang, Park Myeong-su, Seo Jang-hoon, Jang Yun-jeong, Han Hee-jun, Yoo Jae-hwan, Kim Sae-rom, Nam Jin, Kim Heung-gook, Ahn Moon-sook, Hong Seok-cheon, Danny Ahn (g.o.d), Dana, MYNAME (In-soo, Se-yong)	2	Lee Soo-young	"Bingsu Shop Sung Si-kyung" Noh Hye-sung, "Hongdae Trot Hero" Lim Young-woong, "Apgujeong Bank Rock Star" Jeon Chang-hoon Song: Grace	Noh Hye-sung	And I Love You (그리고 사랑해)	260
11–12 (June 26, 2016) (July 3, 2016)	Yoon Sang, Park Myeong-su, Seo Jang-hoon, Jang Yun-jeong, Han Hee-jun, Yoo Jae-hwan, Kim Sae-rom, Nam Jin, Kim Heung-gook, Ahn Moon-sook, Hong Seok-cheon, Danny Ahn (g.o.d), Dana, MYNAME (In-soo, Se-yong)	3	Hwanhee	"Paju Yulgok High's Music Teacher" Boo Seok-hyun, "Ansan Butter Hwanhee" Park Ho-sang, "Kyungnam University's Maenggu" Jung Myung-gyu Song: Missing You (Original: Fly to the Sky)	Jung Myung-gyu	Like a Man (남자답게)	285
13–14 (July 10, 2016) (July 17, 2016) (Note: Special appearance via video by Kim Heung-gook, Kim Na-young and Kim Young-chul on episode 13; Yoo Min-sang, Kim Min-kyung, Hong Seok-cheon and Jeong Jinwoon (2AM) on episode 14.)	Yoon Sang, Park Myeong-su, Seo Jang-hoon, Jang Yun-jeong, Han Hee-jun, Park Mi-sun, Bbaek Ga (Koyote), Double S 301, Kim Jeong-min, Laboum (Haein, Solbin)	Special	Yang Hee-eun & Akdong Musician			From Mother to Daughter (엄마가 딸에게)	
13–14 (July 10, 2016) (July 17, 2016)	Yoon Sang, Park Myeong-su, Seo Jang-hoon, Jang Yun-jeong, Han Hee-jun, Park Mi-sun, Bbaek Ga (Koyote), Double S 301, Kim Jeong-min, Laboum (Haein, Solbin)	Special	Kim Gun-mo feat. Yang Hee-eun & Kim Tae-woo & Sistar			Excuse (핑계)	
13–14 (July 10, 2016) (July 17, 2016)	Yoon Sang, Park Myeong-su, Seo Jang-hoon, Jang Yun-jeong, Han Hee-jun, Park Mi-sun, Bbaek Ga (Koyote), Double S 301, Kim Jeong-min, Laboum (Haein, Solbin)	1	Yang Hee-eun	"Sadang-dong Dimples" Im Soo-jong, "Gun Carriage Kim Kwang-seok" Kang Han-sol, "Sixties Than Flowers" Lee Woong-il & Jang Kwang-cheon & Kim Goo & Im Young-ran & Kim Won-seop Song: Morning Dew (아침이슬)	Im Soo-jong	Love on its Solitude (사랑 그 쓸쓸함에 대하여)	271
13–14 (July 10, 2016) (July 17, 2016)	Yoon Sang, Park Myeong-su, Seo Jang-hoon, Jang Yun-jeong, Han Hee-jun, Park Mi-sun, Bbaek Ga (Koyote), Double S 301, Kim Jeong-min, Laboum (Haein, Solbin)	2	Sistar	"Yeonggwang Gulbi Girl" Son Kyung-jin, "Ssangmun-dong Aebong-ie" Kim Jin-hee, "Reversal Life by Sistar" Kim Chan-mi Song: Give It to Me	Son Kyung-jin	Crying	274
13–14 (July 10, 2016) (July 17, 2016)	Yoon Sang, Park Myeong-su, Seo Jang-hoon, Jang Yun-jeong, Han Hee-jun, Park Mi-sun, Bbaek Ga (Koyote), Double S 301, Kim Jeong-min, Laboum (Haein, Solbin)	3	Kim Gun-mo	"Masan Sulli" Kim Hye-in, "Yongdap-dong Ssen Unnie" Kwon Do-yeon, "Sadang-dong PC Room's Woman" Lee Soo-jeong Song: Wrongful Encounter (잘못된 만남)	Kim Hye-in	I'm Sorry (미안해요)	287
13–14 (July 10, 2016) (July 17, 2016)	Yoon Sang, Park Myeong-su, Seo Jang-hoon, Jang Yun-jeong, Han Hee-jun, Park Mi-sun, Bbaek Ga (Koyote), Double S 301, Kim Jeong-min, Laboum (Haein, Solbin)	4	Kim Tae-woo	(see in the previous episodes)	Park Joo-hyun	To Mother (어머님께) (Original: g.o.d)	285
15–16 (July 24, 2016) (July 31, 2016) (Note: Special appearance via video by Kim Jeong-nam (Turbo) and Jung Sung-ho on episode 15; all cast members of Knowing Bros on episode 16.)	Yoon Sang, Park Myeong-su, Seo Jang-hoon, Jang Yun-jeong, Han Hee-jun, Kwon Oh-joong, Hong Kyung-min, Lee Soo-young, Kim Sae-rom, Jisook (Rainbow)	1	Min Kyung-hoon	"Namyangju Festival Prince" Yoon Jae-hyuk, "Min Kyung-hoon's Handsome Bloody Junior" Lee Jeong-seok, "Daejeon Self-made CEO Park" Park Jin-gook Song: Coward (겁쟁이) (Original: BUZZ)	Park Jin-gook	You Don't Know Man (남자를 몰라) (Original: BUZZ)	280
15–16 (July 24, 2016) (July 31, 2016)	Yoon Sang, Park Myeong-su, Seo Jang-hoon, Jang Yun-jeong, Han Hee-jun, Kwon Oh-joong, Hong Kyung-min, Lee Soo-young, Kim Sae-rom, Jisook (Rainbow)	2	Lee Hyun-woo	"Hwagok-dong Comeback Girl" Choi Ye-yeon, "Hairy Romantic" Hong Don-hee, "Gwangju Kookje High's Flute Girl" Kim Han-na Song: The Day After You Left (헤어진 다음 날)	Kim Han-na	I Have to Forget You (슬픔 속에 그댈 지워야만 해)	266
15–16 (July 24, 2016) (July 31, 2016)	Yoon Sang, Park Myeong-su, Seo Jang-hoon, Jang Yun-jeong, Han Hee-jun, Kwon Oh-joong, Hong Kyung-min, Lee Soo-young, Kim Sae-rom, Jisook (Rainbow)	3	Kim Jong-kook	"Bongcheon-dong S-line" Lee Hye-won, "Daeyoung High's Striker" Lee Kyung-seo, "Soldier's Daughter" Cheon Geon-ye Song: One Man (한 남자)	Lee Kyung-seo	Letter (편지)	283
15–16 (July 24, 2016) (July 31, 2016)	Yoon Sang, Park Myeong-su, Seo Jang-hoon, Jang Yun-jeong, Han Hee-jun, Kwon Oh-joong, Hong Kyung-min, Lee Soo-young, Kim Sae-rom, Jisook (Rainbow)	4	Kim Gun-mo	(see in the previous episodes)	Kim Hye-in	Moon of Seoul (서울의 달)	285
17–18 (August 7, 2016) (August 14, 2016) (Note: Special appearances via video by Shoo, Red Velvet (Irene, Wendy), Jessi, Lee Hwan-jin PD of Running Man and PD of Law of the Jungle on episode 17; Jin Goo on episode 18.)	Yoon Sang, Park Myeong-su, Seo Jang-hoon, Jang Yun-jeong, Han Hee-jun, Moon Hee-kyung, Namgoong Yeon, Lee Ji-hye, Bizzy, Kim Hwan	Special	Kim Gun-mo & Gummy			Kiss (입맞춤) (Original: Somethin' Stupid – Robbie Williams & Nicole Kidman version)	
17–18 (August 7, 2016) (August 14, 2016)	Yoon Sang, Park Myeong-su, Seo Jang-hoon, Jang Yun-jeong, Han Hee-jun, Moon Hee-kyung, Namgoong Yeon, Lee Ji-hye, Bizzy, Kim Hwan	1	Gummy	"Mister Gongjin-dan" Hong Seung, "Bucheon Descendant of the Sun" Jung Chang-hoon, "Ansan Single Daddy" Kim Hyung-joo Song: Childish Adult (어른 아이)	Jung Chang-hoon	You Are My Everything (Descendants of the Sun OST)	281
17–18 (August 7, 2016) (August 14, 2016)	Yoon Sang, Park Myeong-su, Seo Jang-hoon, Jang Yun-jeong, Han Hee-jun, Moon Hee-kyung, Namgoong Yeon, Lee Ji-hye, Bizzy, Kim Hwan	2	Bada	"Dongdaemun Plump Girl" Lee Hye-won, "Sea's Prince" Jo Hong-joon, "Cheongdam-dong's Daughter-in-law" Yoon Ji-young Song: Just a Feeling (Original: S.E.S.)	Jo Hong-joon	Just in Love (꿈을 모아서) (Original: S.E.S.)	289
17–18 (August 7, 2016) (August 14, 2016)	Yoon Sang, Park Myeong-su, Seo Jang-hoon, Jang Yun-jeong, Han Hee-jun, Moon Hee-kyung, Namgoong Yeon, Lee Ji-hye, Bizzy, Kim Hwan	3	Yoon Mi-rae	"Rooftop Speaker" Kye Min-ah, "Doksan-dong Shaved Head" Yang Yong-cheon, "Hongdae Wildcat" Lee Han-na Song: Memories	Kye Min-ah	Black Happiness (검은 행복)	293
17–18 (August 7, 2016) (August 14, 2016)	Yoon Sang, Park Myeong-su, Seo Jang-hoon, Jang Yun-jeong, Han Hee-jun, Moon Hee-kyung, Namgoong Yeon, Lee Ji-hye, Bizzy, Kim Hwan	4	Kim Gun-mo	(see in the previous episodes)	Kim Hye-in	Love Is Leaving (사랑이 떠나가네)	290
19–20 (August 21, 2016) (August 28, 2016) (Note: Special appearances via video by John Park and Kim Gook-jin on episode 19; Kim Gun-mo and Park Na-rae on episode 20.)	Yoon Sang, Park Myeong-su, Seo Jang-hoon, Jang Yun-jeong, Han Hee-jun, Lee Moo-song, Kim Eana, Yang Se-chan	1	Noh Sa-yeon	"Incheon Beauty Deer Hunter" Shin Sung-ho, "Ttangkkeut Village Friends" Kim Hyun-soo & Ahn Se-kwon & Kim Jae-bin & Kim Sung-ho, "Andong Downtown Star" Son Jeong-soo Song: Meeting (만남)	Son Jeong-soo	The Way to Round and Round (돌고 돌아가는 길)	283
19–20 (August 21, 2016) (August 28, 2016)	Yoon Sang, Park Myeong-su, Seo Jang-hoon, Jang Yun-jeong, Han Hee-jun, Lee Moo-song, Kim Eana, Yang Se-chan	2	Tak Jae-hoon	"Sejong Six Children's Excited Father" Maeng Heon-young, "Rock and roll Truck Driver" Go Jeong-hoon, "LA Hwang Family's Father & Daughter" Hwang Gyu-won & Hwang Ye-seul Song: Oh! My Julia (Original: Country Kko Kko)	Hwang Gyu-won & Hwang Ye-seul	Sad Love (애련) (Original: Country Kko Kko)	266
19–20 (August 21, 2016) (August 28, 2016)	Yoon Sang, Park Myeong-su, Seo Jang-hoon, Jang Yun-jeong, Han Hee-jun, Lee Moo-song, Kim Eana, Yang Se-chan	3	Yoon Jong-shin	"Gyeongju Guest House's Young Man" Noh Ho-cheol, "Middle 3rd's Cave Boy" Jeon Chan-bin, "Video Installation Engineer Jo" Jo Han Song: The Day Long Ago (오래전 그날)	Jo Han	Uphill Road (오르막길)	284
19–20 (August 21, 2016) (August 28, 2016)	Yoon Sang, Park Myeong-su, Seo Jang-hoon, Jang Yun-jeong, Han Hee-jun, Lee Moo-song, Kim Eana, Yang Se-chan	4	Yoon Mi-rae	(see in the previous episodes)	Kye Min-ah	The Cure (살자) (feat. Tiger JK & Bizzy) (Original: Tiger JK)	281
21–22 (September 4, 2016) (September 11, 2016) (Note: Special performance via video for Yoon Bok-hee by Insooni, Park Hae-mi, Ailee, Son Jun-ho, Kim So-hyun, Kim Young-chul, Son Seung-yeon and Huh Joon-ho. Special appearances via video by the cast members of Flaming Youth, Jung Joon-young and Kim Kyung-ho on episode 21.)	Yoon Sang, Park Myeong-su, Seo Jang-hoon, Jang Yun-jeong, Han Hee-jun, Gu Bon-seung, Son Jun-ho, Kim So-hyun, Kim Sae-rom	1	Yoon Bok-hee	"Express Delivery Yong-seon-i" Shim Yong-seon, "Ulsan Fruit Shop's Bachelor" Lee Jin-woo, "Hyehwa-dong Kittens" Lee Yong-min & Yoo Chang-seok & Jang Jae-hyuk Song: Where There Is a Song (노래하는 곳에)	Shim Yong-seon	Everyone (여러분)	290
21–22 (September 4, 2016) (September 11, 2016)	Yoon Sang, Park Myeong-su, Seo Jang-hoon, Jang Yun-jeong, Han Hee-jun, Gu Bon-seung, Son Jun-ho, Kim So-hyun, Kim Sae-rom	2	Kim Wan-sun	"Mister Full-time Housewife" Kim Soo-dong, "Pierrot in Rhythm" Choi Jae-hyuk, "Love Evangelist Wan-sun" Kim Geon-joong Song: The Pierrot Laughs at Us (삐에로는 우릴 보고 웃지)	Kim Soo-dong	The Dance in Rhythm (리듬 속의 그 춤을)	274
21–22 (September 4, 2016) (September 11, 2016)	Yoon Sang, Park Myeong-su, Seo Jang-hoon, Jang Yun-jeong, Han Hee-jun, Gu Bon-seung, Son Jun-ho, Kim So-hyun, Kim Sae-rom	3	Yoon Do-hyun	"Police Public Relation Team's Jo Star" Jo Sung-rin, "Rock and roll Pasta" Kim Chang-yong, "Paju Tow truck Driver" Park Hwa-yong Song: A Flying Butterfly (나는 나비) (Original: YB)	Jo Sung-rin	Peppermint Candy (박하사탕) (feat. YB) (Original: YB)	291
21–22 (September 4, 2016) (September 11, 2016)	Yoon Sang, Park Myeong-su, Seo Jang-hoon, Jang Yun-jeong, Han Hee-jun, Gu Bon-seung, Son Jun-ho, Kim So-hyun, Kim Sae-rom	4	Yoon Jong-shin	(see in the previous episodes)	Jo Han	Exhausted (지친 하루)	286
23–24 (September 18, 2016) (September 25, 2016) (Chuseok Special)	Kim Gun-mo team: Members: Bada, Jang Yun-jeong, Kim Tae-woo; Special guest: Kim Heung-gook; Panel: Seo Jang-hoon, Han Hee-jun, Ji Sang-ryeol; Kim Bum-soo team: Members: Yang Hee-eun, Park Myeong-su, Wheesung; Special guest: Jeon In-kwon; Panel: Yoon Sang, Kim Sae-rom	1	Wheesung	"Sea's Prince" Jo Hong-joon		Insomnia (불면증) (Korean version) (Original: Craig David); With Me	
23–24 (September 18, 2016) (September 25, 2016) (Chuseok Special)	Kim Gun-mo team: Members: Bada, Jang Yun-jeong, Kim Tae-woo; Special guest: Kim Heung-gook; Panel: Seo Jang-hoon, Han Hee-jun, Ji Sang-ryeol; Kim Bum-soo team: Members: Yang Hee-eun, Park Myeong-su, Wheesung; Special guest: Jeon In-kwon; Panel: Yoon Sang, Kim Sae-rom	1	Kim Tae-woo	"Daejeon Rhythm Gangster" Lee Seo-jin		Friday Night; One Candle (촛불하나) (Original: g.o.d)	
23–24 (September 18, 2016) (September 25, 2016) (Chuseok Special)	Kim Gun-mo team: Members: Bada, Jang Yun-jeong, Kim Tae-woo; Special guest: Kim Heung-gook; Panel: Seo Jang-hoon, Han Hee-jun, Ji Sang-ryeol; Kim Bum-soo team: Members: Yang Hee-eun, Park Myeong-su, Wheesung; Special guest: Jeon In-kwon; Panel: Yoon Sang, Kim Sae-rom	2	Kim Heung-gook	"Bangbae-dong Our Ugly Duckling" Kim Gun-mo, "Seongsu-dong Sea Fairy" Bada, "Sinsa-dong Bear" Kim Tae-woo Song: Swallowtail (호랑나비)	Kim Gun-mo	Wangsimni in 59 (59년 왕십리)	
23–24 (September 18, 2016) (September 25, 2016) (Chuseok Special)	Kim Gun-mo team: Members: Bada, Jang Yun-jeong, Kim Tae-woo; Special guest: Kim Heung-gook; Panel: Seo Jang-hoon, Han Hee-jun, Ji Sang-ryeol; Kim Bum-soo team: Members: Yang Hee-eun, Park Myeong-su, Wheesung; Special guest: Jeon In-kwon; Panel: Yoon Sang, Kim Sae-rom	2	Yang Hee-eun	Jeon In-kwon		Evergreen Tree (상록수)	
23–24 (September 18, 2016) (September 25, 2016) (Chuseok Special)	Kim Gun-mo team: Members: Bada, Jang Yun-jeong, Kim Tae-woo; Special guest: Kim Heung-gook; Panel: Seo Jang-hoon, Han Hee-jun, Ji Sang-ryeol; Kim Bum-soo team: Members: Yang Hee-eun, Park Myeong-su, Wheesung; Special guest: Jeon In-kwon; Panel: Yoon Sang, Kim Sae-rom	3	Jang Yun-jeong	"Andong Downtown Star" Son Jeong-soo		First Marriage 2 (초혼 II (송인))	
23–24 (September 18, 2016) (September 25, 2016) (Chuseok Special)	Kim Gun-mo team: Members: Bada, Jang Yun-jeong, Kim Tae-woo; Special guest: Kim Heung-gook; Panel: Seo Jang-hoon, Han Hee-jun, Ji Sang-ryeol; Kim Bum-soo team: Members: Yang Hee-eun, Park Myeong-su, Wheesung; Special guest: Jeon In-kwon; Panel: Yoon Sang, Kim Sae-rom	3	Yang Hee-eun	"Rooftop Speaker" Kye Min-ah		A Farewell to Sorrow (슬픔 이젠 안녕)	
23–24 (September 18, 2016) (September 25, 2016) (Chuseok Special)	Kim Gun-mo team: Members: Bada, Jang Yun-jeong, Kim Tae-woo; Special guest: Kim Heung-gook; Panel: Seo Jang-hoon, Han Hee-jun, Ji Sang-ryeol; Kim Bum-soo team: Members: Yang Hee-eun, Park Myeong-su, Wheesung; Special guest: Jeon In-kwon; Panel: Yoon Sang, Kim Sae-rom	4	Bada	"14-year-old High-pitched Captain" Yoon Min-seo, "Sweet 18-year-old Lady Ye-jin" Kim Ye-jin		Dreams Come True (Original: S.E.S.); Maria (Korean version) (Original: Jimmy Destri)	
23–24 (September 18, 2016) (September 25, 2016) (Chuseok Special)	Kim Gun-mo team: Members: Bada, Jang Yun-jeong, Kim Tae-woo; Special guest: Kim Heung-gook; Panel: Seo Jang-hoon, Han Hee-jun, Ji Sang-ryeol; Kim Bum-soo team: Members: Yang Hee-eun, Park Myeong-su, Wheesung; Special guest: Jeon In-kwon; Panel: Yoon Sang, Kim Sae-rom	4	Park Myeong-su	"Haeundae Bob Hairstyle" Kang Min-sung & Seo Jang-ho, "Sacheon Fish Cake Girl" Kim Da-mi, "Bukhansan Freshwater Eel Girl" Kim Sae-ha		Leon (레옹) (Original: EU God-G Isn't EU (Park Myeong-su & IU))	
23–24 (September 18, 2016) (September 25, 2016) (Chuseok Special)	Kim Gun-mo team: Members: Bada, Jang Yun-jeong, Kim Tae-woo; Special guest: Kim Heung-gook; Panel: Seo Jang-hoon, Han Hee-jun, Ji Sang-ryeol; Kim Bum-soo team: Members: Yang Hee-eun, Park Myeong-su, Wheesung; Special guest: Jeon In-kwon; Panel: Yoon Sang, Kim Sae-rom	5	Kim Bum-soo	"Masan Sulli" Kim Hye-in, "Wolmido Little Giant" Park Joo-hyun, "Wedding Gummy" Joo Seol-ok Song: Once Upon a Day (하루)	Kim Hye-in	Man and Woman (남과여)	
23–24 (September 18, 2016) (September 25, 2016) (Chuseok Special)	Kim Gun-mo team: Members: Bada, Jang Yun-jeong, Kim Tae-woo; Special guest: Kim Heung-gook; Panel: Seo Jang-hoon, Han Hee-jun, Ji Sang-ryeol; Kim Bum-soo team: Members: Yang Hee-eun, Park Myeong-su, Wheesung; Special guest: Jeon In-kwon; Panel: Yoon Sang, Kim Sae-rom	5	Kim Gun-mo	"Baekban Restaurant's Matilda" Kyung Sang-eun, "Achasan Ice Cream Girl" Lee Min-jeong, "Hongdae Wildcat" Lee Han-na Song: Speed (스피드)	Lee Min-jeong	Woman in the Rain (빗속의 여인)	
23–24 (September 18, 2016) (September 25, 2016) (Chuseok Special)	Kim Gun-mo team: Members: Bada, Jang Yun-jeong, Kim Tae-woo; Special guest: Kim Heung-gook; Panel: Seo Jang-hoon, Han Hee-jun, Ji Sang-ryeol; Kim Bum-soo team: Members: Yang Hee-eun, Park Myeong-su, Wheesung; Special guest: Jeon In-kwon; Panel: Yoon Sang, Kim Sae-rom	MVP	"Andong Downtown Star" Son Jeong-soo				
25–26 (October 2, 2016) (October 9, 2016) (Note: Special appearances via video by Hong Jin-young, Chun Myung-hoon, Yoo Hee-yeol, Cho Jae-hyun and Kim Tae-won on episode 25; INFINITE on episode 26.)	Yoon Sang, Park Myeong-su, Seo Jang-hoon, Han Hee-jun, Kim Sae-rom, Namgoong Yeon, Bae Yoon-jeong, Kim Hwan, Sam Okyere, KIXS (DMTN)	Special	Jeon In-kwon & Yoon Do-hyun			Please (제발) (Original: Deulgukhwa)	
25–26 (October 2, 2016) (October 9, 2016)	Yoon Sang, Park Myeong-su, Seo Jang-hoon, Han Hee-jun, Kim Sae-rom, Namgoong Yeon, Bae Yoon-jeong, Kim Hwan, Sam Okyere, KIXS (DMTN)	1	Koyote (Note: Only Shin Ji performed the principal song with their duo without Kim Jong-min and Bbaek Ga.)	"Right Now New Recruit" Won Joo-hee, "Nonhyeon-dong Gold Miss" Jeon Hyang-gi, "Seoul University's Dumb and Dumber" Kwon Sung-min & Kim Sung-bo Song: Genuine (순정)	Won Joo-hee	Sad Dream (비몽)	272
25–26 (October 2, 2016) (October 9, 2016)	Yoon Sang, Park Myeong-su, Seo Jang-hoon, Han Hee-jun, Kim Sae-rom, Namgoong Yeon, Bae Yoon-jeong, Kim Hwan, Sam Okyere, KIXS (DMTN)	2	DJ Doc	"Street Fighter" Kim Soo-bin, "Doing Rap Deputy Lee" Lee Sang-ok, "Running Deputy Kim" Kim Chan-hyuk Song: Run To You	Kim Chang-hyuk (Note: Special appearance and dance performance by "Seoul University Dumb and Dumber" Kwon Sung-min & Kim Sung-bo (Koyote's former duo candidate) between DJ DOC's principal song.)	I'm a Guy Like This (나 이런 사람이야)	285
25–26 (October 2, 2016) (October 9, 2016)	Yoon Sang, Park Myeong-su, Seo Jang-hoon, Han Hee-jun, Kim Sae-rom, Namgoong Yeon, Bae Yoon-jeong, Kim Hwan, Sam Okyere, KIXS (DMTN)	3	Jeon In-kwon	"Brave Jo Se-ho" Park Joon-hyung, "Two Faces' Former Teacher" Jeon Byung-cheol, "Songdo Food truck" Jung Hyun-goo Song: Don't Worry (걱정말아요 그대)	Jung Hyun-goo	That's Only My World (그것만이 내 세상) (Original: Deulgukhwa)	295
25–26 (October 2, 2016) (October 9, 2016)	Yoon Sang, Park Myeong-su, Seo Jang-hoon, Han Hee-jun, Kim Sae-rom, Namgoong Yeon, Bae Yoon-jeong, Kim Hwan, Sam Okyere, KIXS (DMTN)	4	Yoon Do-hyun	(see in the previous episodes)	Jo Sung-rin	Blue Whale (흰수염고래) (feat. YB) (Original: YB)	290
27–28 (October 23, 2016) (November 6, 2016) (Note: Special appearances via video by Kim Gyu-ri, Yoo Hee-kwan, Lee Jong-suk and Taeyang on episode 27; Sandara Park, Seohyun and Kwon Hyuk-soo on episode 28.)	Yoon Sang, Park Myeong-su, Seo Jang-hoon, Jang Yun-jeong, Han Hee-jun, Kim Sae-rom, Joon Park (g.o.d), Son Jun-ho, Ladies' Code	Special	Lee Moon-se & Zion.T			I Don't Know Yet (난 아직 모르잖아요)	
27–28 (October 23, 2016) (November 6, 2016)	Yoon Sang, Park Myeong-su, Seo Jang-hoon, Jang Yun-jeong, Han Hee-jun, Kim Sae-rom, Joon Park (g.o.d), Son Jun-ho, Ladies' Code	1	Zion.T	"KAIST Punk" Kim Ji-yoon, "Dongil Girls' High Young-sim" Shin Ye-bom, "Suyuri Delivery Car" Jung Yeon-kyung Song: Eat (꺼내 먹어요)	Jung Yeon-kyung	Yanghwa Bridge (양화대교)	285
27–28 (October 23, 2016) (November 6, 2016)	Yoon Sang, Park Myeong-su, Seo Jang-hoon, Jang Yun-jeong, Han Hee-jun, Kim Sae-rom, Joon Park (g.o.d), Son Jun-ho, Ladies' Code	2	Ock Joo-hyun	"Bongcheon-dong Kim Kyung-ho" Lee Tae-rang, "Deogyang District Lee Jai-jin" Kim Han-jae, "Dongdaemun Ock Joo-hyun" Park Joo-hee Song: Now (Original: Fin.K.L)	Kim Han-jae	I (난)	288
27–28 (October 23, 2016) (November 6, 2016)	Yoon Sang, Park Myeong-su, Seo Jang-hoon, Jang Yun-jeong, Han Hee-jun, Kim Sae-rom, Joon Park (g.o.d), Son Jun-ho, Ladies' Code	3	Lee Moon-se	"Bulgwang-dong Special Guard Assignment's Police" Kim Bo-ram, "Wonil Middle's Cosmos" Kim Yoon-hee, "Smiling Angel Stewardess" Song Saem-yi Song: Standing Under the Shade of a Roadside Tree (가로수 그늘 아래 서면)	Kim Yoon-hee	Only the Sound of Her Laughter (그녀의 웃음소리뿐)	295
27–28 (October 23, 2016) (November 6, 2016)	Yoon Sang, Park Myeong-su, Seo Jang-hoon, Jang Yun-jeong, Han Hee-jun, Kim Sae-rom, Joon Park (g.o.d), Son Jun-ho, Ladies' Code	4	Jeon In-kwon	(see in the previous episodes)	Jung Hyun-goo	After Love (사랑한 후에) (Original: Deulgukhwa)	291
29–30 (November 13, 2016) (November 20, 2016) (Note: Special appearances via video by Kwon Hyuk-soo, Kang Kyun-sung and Onew on episode 29.)	Yoon Sang, Park Myeong-su, Seo Jang-hoon, Jang Yun-jeong, Han Hee-jun, Kim Sae-rom, Kim Hyung-gyu, Lee Yong-jin, Yang Se-chan, Kim Ye-won	Special	Kim Kyung-ho			Hey Hey Hey (Original: Kim Yoon-ah)	
29–30 (November 13, 2016) (November 20, 2016)	Yoon Sang, Park Myeong-su, Seo Jang-hoon, Jang Yun-jeong, Han Hee-jun, Kim Sae-rom, Kim Hyung-gyu, Lee Yong-jin, Yang Se-chan, Kim Ye-won	Special	Lee Moon-se & Kim Kyung-ho & K.Will			Unpredictable Life (알 수 없는 인생)	
29–30 (November 13, 2016) (November 20, 2016)	Yoon Sang, Park Myeong-su, Seo Jang-hoon, Jang Yun-jeong, Han Hee-jun, Kim Sae-rom, Kim Hyung-gyu, Lee Yong-jin, Yang Se-chan, Kim Ye-won	1	K.Will	"Choir Honey Unnie" Ahn Ji-yeon, "K.Will Little Sister" Seok Ji-soo, "Cheongnyangni Thumbelina" Lee Ye-seul Song: Day 1 (오늘부터 1일)	Seok ji-soo	Growing (꽃이 핀다)	282
29–30 (November 13, 2016) (November 20, 2016)	Yoon Sang, Park Myeong-su, Seo Jang-hoon, Jang Yun-jeong, Han Hee-jun, Kim Sae-rom, Kim Hyung-gyu, Lee Yong-jin, Yang Se-chan, Kim Ye-won	2	Kim Yoon-ah	"Chubby-Cheek Puberty" Shin Ye-won, "My Dream is Jun Hyun-moo" Yeom Sang-yeop, "Dongdaemun Red Shoes" Shin Hye-ryun Song: Deviation (일탈) (Original: Jaurim)	Shin Ye-won	Going Home	277
29–30 (November 13, 2016) (November 20, 2016)	Yoon Sang, Park Myeong-su, Seo Jang-hoon, Jang Yun-jeong, Han Hee-jun, Kim Sae-rom, Kim Hyung-gyu, Lee Yong-jin, Yang Se-chan, Kim Ye-won	3	Kim Kyung-ho	"Jeolla-do Shouting" Jang Do-in, "Kyung-ho Voice's Philippines Mother" Gwon Elaine Quijano, "Gangwon-do Kyung-ho's Doppelgänger" Lee Yong-gi Song: People Who Make Me Sad (나를 슬프게 하는 사람들)	Gwon Elaine Quijano	Forbidden Love (금지된 사랑)	291
29–30 (November 13, 2016) (November 20, 2016)	Yoon Sang, Park Myeong-su, Seo Jang-hoon, Jang Yun-jeong, Han Hee-jun, Kim Sae-rom, Kim Hyung-gyu, Lee Yong-jin, Yang Se-chan, Kim Ye-won	4	Lee Moon-se	(see in the previous episodes)	Kim Yoon-hee	Whistling (휘파람)	296

==== List of winners ====
Pair #	Episodes	Singer	Participant	Score
0	Pilot	Kim Bum-soo	"Sacheon Fishcake Girl"	277
1	1–2	Lee Sun-hee	"Sweet 18-year-old Lady Ye-jin" Kim Ye-jin	291
2	3–4	Lee Sun-hee	"Sweet 18-year-old Lady Ye-jin" Kim Ye-jin	291
3	5–6	Lee Sun-hee	"Sweet 18-year-old Lady Ye-jin" Kim Ye-jin	287
4	7–8	Lee Sun-hee	"Sweet 18-year-old Lady Ye-jin" Kim Ye-jin	287
5	9–10	Lee Sun-hee	"Sweet 18-year-old Lady Ye-jin" Kim Ye-jin	291
6	11–12	Kim Tae-woo	"Wolmido Little Giant" Park Joo-hyun	287
7	13–14	Kim Gun-mo	"Masan Sulli" Kim Hye-in	287
8	15–16	Kim Gun-mo	"Masan Sulli" Kim Hye-in	285
9	17–18	Yoon Mi-rae	"Rooftop Speaker" Kye Min-ah	293
10	19–20	Yoon Jong-shin	"Video Installation's Engineer Jo" Jo Han	284
11	21–22	Yoon Do-hyun	"Police Public Relation Team's Jo Star" Jo Sung-rin	291
13	25–26	Jeon In-kwon	"Songdo Food truck" Jung Hyun-goo	295
14	27–28	Lee Moon-se	"Wonil Middle's Cosmos" Kim Yoon-hee	295
15	29–30	Lee Moon-se	"Wonil Middle's Cosmos" Kim Yoon-hee	296

== List of guests and results ( Season 2 ) ==
Note: the section labeled in gold is the winner

=== Season 2 ===
List of episodes in Season 2

==== List of Episodes ====
Episode # (Air Date) References	Panel	Main Guest	Random Competition		Guest's Final Choice	Final Duo Song	Score /200
Episode # (Air Date) References	Panel	Main Guest	1:7 Match	1:3 Match	Guest's Final Choice	Final Duo Song	Score /200
1–2 (March 26, 2017) (April 2, 2017)	Kim Jun-hyun, Bada, Yang Yo-seob	Lee Moon-se	"Suwon Art Student Oppa" Jang Woo-jae, "Gapyeong–Seorak First Love History Teacher" Lee Choong-mo & Woo Ah-han, "Cheonan Romantic Guitar" Hwang Joo-myung, "Daejeon Gyeryongsan Popeye" Lee Min-gwan, "Park Bo-gum's Best Friend Hwan-ji" Jo Hwan-ji, "Busan Shining Duruchigi" Cha Hyung-joong, "Andong Downtown Star" Son Jeong-soo (Note: He was the season 1's participant, duet first with Noh Sa-yeon on episodes 19–20, then he sang duet with Jang Yun-jeong on special episodes 23–24 and took the MVP title.) Lee So-ra's song: Please (제발); Lee Moon-se's song: In the Rain (빗속에서)	Cha Hyung-joong, Jang Woo-jae, Hwang Joo-myung Song: While We Live in This World (이 세상 살아가다 보면)	Hwang Joo-myung	Old Love (옛 사랑)	182
1–2 (March 26, 2017) (April 2, 2017)	Kim Bum-soo, Jang Yun-jeong, DinDin	Lee So-ra	"Suwon Art Student Oppa" Jang Woo-jae, "Gapyeong–Seorak First Love History Teacher" Lee Choong-mo & Woo Ah-han, "Cheonan Romantic Guitar" Hwang Joo-myung, "Daejeon Gyeryongsan Popeye" Lee Min-gwan, "Park Bo-gum's Best Friend Hwan-ji" Jo Hwan-ji, "Busan Shining Duruchigi" Cha Hyung-joong, "Andong Downtown Star" Son Jeong-soo Lee So-ra's song: Please (제발); Lee Moon-se's song: In the Rain (빗속에서)	Lee Min-gwan, Son Jeong-soo, Jo Hwan-ji* Song: Wind is Blowing (바람이 분다)	Jo Hwan-ji	The Blue in You (그대 안의 블루)	136
1–2 (March 26, 2017) (April 2, 2017)	Special	Lee Moon-se & Lee So-ra				Don't Forget (잊지 말기로 해)	
1–2 (March 26, 2017) (April 2, 2017)	Special	Lee Moon-se & HIGHLIGHT				Spring Breeze (봄바람)	
3–4 (April 9, 2017) (April 16, 2017) (Note: Special appearance via video by Park Seul-gi on episode 3.)	Kim Jun-hyun, Bada, Yang Yo-seob	Lena Park	"Gangneung Draft Beer Girl" Kwon Ah-young, "5 Months Pregnant's Blessed Mother" Seon Seo-hee, "Bundang Little Jun Hyun-moo" Lee Joon-ho, "Ewha University Vitamin" Yoo Jin-kyung, "Ilsan Nuilliriya" Kim Na-yeon, "Goesan Mister Leek" Kwon Young-soo, "Daejeon Gyeryongsan Popeye" Lee Min-gwan (Note: Lee So-ra have chosen him for her Best 3 on the previous episodes, but he wasn't her last choice.) Kim Bum-soo's song: The Practical Usage of Sadness (슬픔활용법); Lena Park's song: P.S. I Love You	Kwon Young-soo, Lee Min-gwan, Lee Joon-ho* Song: A Person in My Dream (몽중인)	Lee Min-gwan	In the Dream (꿈에)	145
3–4 (April 9, 2017) (April 16, 2017)	Seo Jang-hoon, Jang Yun-jeong, DinDin	Kim Bum-soo	"Gangneung Draft Beer Girl" Kwon Ah-young, "5 Months Pregnant's Blessed Mother" Seon Seo-hee, "Bundang Little Jun Hyun-moo" Lee Joon-ho, "Ewha University Vitamin" Yoo Jin-kyung, "Ilsan Nuilliriya" Kim Na-yeon, "Goesan Mister Leek" Kwon Young-soo, "Daejeon Gyeryongsan Popeye" Lee Min-gwan Kim Bum-soo's song: The Practical Usage of Sadness (슬픔활용법); Lena Park's song: P.S. I Love You	Kim Na-yeon, Kwon Ah-young, Yoo Jin-kyung Song: Like a Fool to Me (바보 같은 내게)	Kwon Ah-young	One Upon a Day (하루)	156
3–4 (April 9, 2017) (April 16, 2017)	Special	Lena Park & Kim Bum-soo				Nagging (잔소리) (Original: IU & Seulong)	
3–4 (April 9, 2017) (April 16, 2017)	Special	Lena Park & Song So-hee				If I Leave (나 가거든) (Original: Sumi Jo)	
5–6 (April 30, 2017) (May 7, 2017) (Note: Special appearance via video by Kim Sung-soo (Cool) on episode 5.)	Kim Jun-hyun, Yang Yo-seob, Shin Ji (Koyote)	Kim Won-jun	"Namyangju Cook King" Ahn Byung-jae, "Ilsan Bus No. 1000" Kim Joon-woo, "Daegu Miss Jokbal" Lee Go-woon, "Uijeongbu Engine Oil" Goo Soo-kyung, "Hapcheon Earthenware Pot" Park Min-seon, "Jeju Muscular Man" Song Jong-hoon, "Wangsimni Class Chief Oh" Oh Min-young Kim Won-jun's song: In the Dead of Night (모두 잠든 후에); Lee Jae-hoon's song: All for You	Lee Go-woon, Kim Joon-woo, Goo Soo-kyung Song: Always (언제나)	Goo Soo-kyung	Show	168
5–6 (April 30, 2017) (May 7, 2017)	Kim Bum-soo, Jang Yun-jeong, DinDin, Kim Ji-min	Lee Jae-hoon	"Namyangju Cook King" Ahn Byung-jae, "Ilsan Bus No. 1000" Kim Joon-woo, "Daegu Miss Jokbal" Lee Go-woon, "Uijeongbu Engine Oil" Goo Soo-kyung, "Hapcheon Earthenware Pot" Park Min-seon, "Jeju Muscular Man" Song Jong-hoon, "Wangsimni Class Chief Oh" Oh Min-young Kim Won-jun's song: In the Dead of Night (모두 잠든 후에); Lee Jae-hoon's song: All for You	Oh Min-young, Park Min-seon, Ahn Byung-jae Song: Sorrow (애상) (Original: Cool)	Park Min-seon	Before Sadness Comes (슬퍼지려 하기 전에) (Original: Cool)	175
5–6 (April 30, 2017) (May 7, 2017)	Special	Lee Jae-hoon & Minah (Girl's Day)				Aloha (아로하)	
5–6 (April 30, 2017) (May 7, 2017)	Special	Kim Won-jun & DinDin				While You Were Not Here (너 없는 동안)	
Episode # (Air Date) References	Main Guest	Panel	Random Competition		Guest's Final Choice	Final Duo Song	Score /200
Episode # (Air Date) References	Main Guest	Panel	1:5 Match	1:3 Match	Guest's Final Choice	Final Duo Song	Score /200
7–8 (May 14, 2017) (May 21, 2017)	Kim Bum-soo, Jang Yun-jeong, DinDin	Insooni	"Incheon Mrs. Cop" Yoo Hye-ri, "Bongcheon-dong Climacteric" Kim Yoon-jeong, "Gumi Karaoke Room's CEO Jin" Jin Sang-hyo, "Yongin Leg Model" Seo Ji-hye, "Ansan Working Mom" Yang Ye-seul Song: Night After Night (밤이면 밤마다)	Yoo Hye-ri, Jin Sang-hyo, Kim Yoon-jeong Song: Again (또)	Kim Yoon-jeong	A Goose's Dream (거위의 꿈)	175
7–8 (May 14, 2017) (May 21, 2017)	Kim Jun-hyun, Bada, Yang Yo-seob	Ailee	"Yong In University's One Full Point Winner" Baek Seung-goo, "Gireum-dong Day Care Center's Teacher Ah-reum" Choi Ah-reum, "Mexico Music PD" Christina, "Ansan Han-u Bachelor" Sung Han-joon, "Kyung Hee University's Chicken Girl" Park Ja-young Song: U&I	Park Ja-young, Sung Han-joon, Choi Ah-reum Song: Singing Got Better (노래가 늘었어)	Sung Han-joon	I Will Go to You Like the First Snow (첫 눈처럼 너에게 가겠다) (Goblin OST)	159
7–8 (May 14, 2017) (May 21, 2017)	Special	Insooni & Ailee				It's Raining Men (Original: The Weather Girls)	
7–8 (May 14, 2017) (May 21, 2017)	Special	Insooni & Bada				Father (아버지)	
9–10 (May 28, 2017) (June 4, 2017) (Note: Special appearances via video by iKON (Bobby, B.I), Winner, Suho (Exo) and Kang Ha-neul on episode 9.)	Kim Bum-soo, Seo Jang-hoon, Jang Yun-jeong, DinDin, Loona 1/3, Boyfriend (Park Hyun-jin, Kim Jong-seop)	Psy	"Gwangmyeong Invincible Firefighter" Choi Kyung-hoon, "Bucheon 65-year-old Grandmother Eminem" Kim Hyun-sook, "Guro-dong Michael Jackson" Hwang Yong-yeon, "Busan Special Warrior Delivery" Bang Ji-hwan, "Gimpo Tomorrow Interpreter King" Lee Joo-hyun Song: Champion (챔피언)	Lee Joo-hyun, Choi Kyung-hoon, Bang Ji-hwan Song: It's Art (예술이야)	Bang Ji-hwan	Entertainer (연예인)	169
9–10 (May 28, 2017) (June 4, 2017)	Kim Jun-hyun, Bada, Yang Yo-seob, Kim Eana, Oh My Girl	IU	"Seongnam Market Security Guard" Nam Hyun-seop, "Songdo Implant" Jeon Sung-joon, "Bundang Little IU" Jo Yi-hyun, "Sanggye-dong Old Days' Naengmyeon" Jung Jae-ik, "Sindaebang Taekwondo Girl" Choi Han-hee Song: Good Day (좋은 날)	Jung Jae-ik, Nam Hyun-seop, Jeon Sung-joon Song: Dear Name (이름에게)	Nam Hyun-seop	You and I (너랑 나)	162
9–10 (May 28, 2017) (June 4, 2017)	Special	Psy & IU				What Would Have Been? (어땠을까) (Original: Psy ft. Lena Park)	
9–10 (May 28, 2017) (June 4, 2017)	Special	Psy (again stage)				Champion (챔피언)	
9–10 (May 28, 2017) (June 4, 2017)	Special	IU & Lee Byung-woo				Love Alone (그렇게 사랑은)	
9–10 (May 28, 2017) (June 4, 2017)	Special	Psy (ending stage)				It's Art (예술이야)	
11–12 (June 11, 2017) (June 18, 2017)	Kim Jun-hyun, Bada, Yang Yo-seob, Boohwal's former vocals (Kim Jong-seo, Park Wan-kyu), Solbin (Laboum)	Boohwal (Note: Former vocal Park Wan-kyu replaced the current vocal Kim Dong-myung in Boohwal's main performances, except the special stage.)	"Incheon Wheat Beer" Shim Tae-hoon, "Busan Rock 'N' Roll Korean Medicine" Lee Gwang-ho, "Namyangju Kickboxing Beautiful Girl" Lee Yoon-woo, "Jinju Charisma Man" Bae Geun-tae, "Luxury Karaoke Box's CEO Jang" Jang Won-min Song: Never Ending Story	Lee Gwang-ho, Lee Yoon-woo, Jang Won-min Song: Lonely Night	Lee Gwang-ho	Reminiscence III - Last Concert (회상 III - 마지막 콘서트) (Note: Originally sung by Boohwal's 2nd vocal Lee Seung-chul.)	162
11–12 (June 11, 2017) (June 18, 2017)	Kim Bum-soo, Jang Yun-jeong, DinDin, Kim Eana, "Ballad F4" (SG Wannabe's Lee Seok-hoon, 2AM/Homme's Changmin, B1A4's Sandeul, SHINee's Onew)	Kim Yeon-woo	"Marine Corps Baby Soldier" Jo Yeon-ho, "Cheomseongdae Piano Teacher" Cha Eun-kyung, "Gwangju's Good Twins" Shin Dae-woo & Shin Dae-geun, "Iksan Honey Melon" Baek Hyun-ji, "Busan Convenience Store Oppa" Moon Jong-min Song: Is It Still Beautiful (여전히 아름다운지) (Original: Toy)	Jo Yeon-ho, Shin Dae-woo & Shin Dae-geun, Moon Jong-min Song: Love, That Common Word (사랑한다는 흔한 말)	Moon Jong-min	Remember I Was Next to You (내가 너의 곁에 잠시 살았다는 걸) (Note: Kim Yeon-woo's debut song in 1996 when he was a featured vocal of You Hee-yeol's project band Toy.)	189
11–12 (June 11, 2017) (June 18, 2017)	Special	Kim Yeon-woo & "Ballad F3" ("Ballad F4" except Lee Seok-hoon)				Lucifer (Original: SHINee)	
11–12 (June 11, 2017) (June 18, 2017)	Special	Boohwal & iKON				The Story of the Rain and You (비와 당신의 이야기)	
13–14 (June 25, 2017) (July 2, 2017) (Note: There is not BEST 5 for this two episodes.)	Kim Jun-hyun, Bada, Twice (Momo, Jihyo, Dahyun)	Seol Woon-do	"Gyeongju Fruit Co-chair Chief Kim" Kim Kyung-jin, "Pohang Clinic Department Head Lee" Lee Seo-young, "Wando Village's Flaming Header" Kim Sung-jin Song: The Woman of Samba (쌈바의 여인)		Kim Sung-jin	30 Lost Years (잃어버린 30년)	125
13–14 (June 25, 2017) (July 2, 2017)	Jang Yun-jeong, Yang Yo-seob, iKON (Jay, DK, Ju-ne)	Daesung	"Gugak High 2nd Grade's Chignon So-won" Kim So-won, "Hongseong Housewife Ssireum King" Kim Kyung-ah, "Daejeon Snack Delivery's Team Leader Oh" Oh Dae-hwan Song: Big Hit (대박이야!)		Kim Kyung-ah	Look at Me, Gwisun (날봐, 귀순)	129
13–14 (June 25, 2017) (July 2, 2017)	Kim Bum-soo, DinDin, Kim Eana, Twice (Jeongyeon, Tzuyu)	Hong Jin-young	"Incheon Persevere Hot dog" Jeon Tae-sung, "Haeundae Birthday Party Doctor" Shin Ji-won, "Underground Room Quick Service" Heo Won-nyung Song: Love Battery (사랑의 배터리)		Heo Won-nyung	Cheer Up (산다는 건)	102
13–14 (June 25, 2017) (July 2, 2017)	Special	Seol Woon-do & Hong Jin-young				One Summer Night (Be Happy) (Korean version) (Original: Chelsia Chan & Kenny Bee)	
13–14 (June 25, 2017) (July 2, 2017)	Special	Jang Yun-jeong & Daesung				Broken Wall Clock (고장난 벽시계) (Original: Na Hoon-a)	
15–16 (July 9, 2017) (July 16, 2017)	Kim Bum-soo, Jang Yun-jeong, DinDin, Yoon Il-sang, Chen (Exo), Blackpink (Jisoo, Lisa), Pristin (Nayoung, Roa)	Lee Eun-mi	"Miari Charcoal Guy" Jung Sung-min, "Anyang Mamma Teacher" Wi Sung-hee, "Paju High's 2nd Grade's Emotional Leader" Jang Ye-jin, "Itaewon Bonjour Chef" Park Gil-joo, "Sillim-dong Scissors Hand" Choi Ha-na Song: I Have a Lover (애인... 있어요)	Park Gil-joo, Wi Sung-hee, Jang Ye-jin Song: We're Breaking Up (헤어지는 중입니다)	Jang Ye-jin	Nocturne (녹턴)	159
15–16 (July 9, 2017) (July 16, 2017)	Kim Jun-hyun, Bada, Kim Eana, Kim Hwan, Mamamoo, Seventeen (Jeonghan, Wonwoo)	Yangpa	"Suwon Mini Car Girl" Lee Jeong-seon, "Gwangan-ri 2nd Generation Shoemaker" Kwon Dae-hee, "Haeundae Sushi Bachelor" Jang Jae-yong, "Yeouido Bank's Deputy Seo" Seo Yoon-seok, "Yangpa's 20 Years Fan Club President" Lee Sol-yi Song: Heart Beat Away (애송이의 사랑)	Kwon Dae-hee, Seo Yoon-seok, Jang Jae-yong Song: A'ddio	Kwon Dae-hee	Love.. What Is It? (사랑.. 그게 뭔데)	138
15–16 (July 9, 2017) (July 16, 2017)	Special	Lee Eun-mi & Lee Byeo-ri (Forte di Quattro)				Albatros (알바트로스)	
15–16 (July 9, 2017) (July 16, 2017)	Special	Yangpa & Mamamoo				Uptown Funk (Original: Mark Ronson ft. Bruno Mars)	
15–16 (July 9, 2017) (July 16, 2017)	Special	Lee Eun-mi & Chen (Exo)				I Have a Lover (애인... 있어요)	
15–16 (July 9, 2017) (July 16, 2017)	Special	Lee Eun-mi (again stage)				Separate Ways (Original: Journey)	
17–18 (July 23, 2017) (July 30, 2017)	Kim Jun-hyun, Bada, Yang Yo-seob, Kim Eana, Chae Yeon, UP10TION (Jinhoo, Kuhn, Bitto, Sunyoul, Gyujin, Xiao)	Park Mi-kyung	"Yeongdeungpo Horse Muscle" Kim Seung-joon, "Yangpyeong Guest House Cleaner Leader" Lee Soo-min, "Jirisan Baeksuk Bachelor" Choi Hyo-dong, "Chungbuk County Office's Voice Announcer" Kang Hye-min, "Daehangno Ticket King" Lee Ji-young Song: Unreasonable Reason (이유 같지 않은 이유)	Lee Soo-min, Choi Hyo-dong, Lee Ji-young Song: Obsession (집착)	Lee Ji-young	Distant Memories of You (기억 속의 먼 그대에게)	169
17–18 (July 23, 2017) (July 30, 2017)	Kim Bum-soo, Jang Yun-jeong, DinDin, Kahi, Oh My Girl	Clon	"Jamwon Elementary School's Dance Teacher" Kang Hye-rim, "Busan Laughter Doctor" Park Jong-hyuk, "Jamsil Little Mermaid" Hwang Hye-ji, "Haeundae Salesperson Clon" Cheon Joon-ho & Nam Hyung-joon, "Garak Middle School's President Won" Won Ji-young Song: Kung Ddari Sha Bah Rah (꿍따리 샤바라)	Hwang Hye-ji, Won Ji-young, Cheon Joon-ho & Nam Hyung-joon Song: Come Back (돌아와)	Hwang Hye-ji	Love and Soul (사랑과 영혼)	156
17–18 (July 23, 2017) (July 30, 2017)	Special	Park Mi-kyung & Red Velvet (Wendy, Seulgi)				Dream Girls & One Night Only (Original: Musical Dreamgirls OST, composed by Henry Krieger and Tom Eyen)	
17–18 (July 23, 2017) (July 30, 2017)	Special	DJ Koo & Clon Friends (Chae Yeon, Kahi)				Everybody / I (난) (Original: Clon); Bang Bang (Original: Jessie J & Ariana Grande & Nicki Minaj); First Love (초련) (Original: Clon)	
19–20 (August 6, 2017) (August 13, 2017); Star Wars Special (Note: The "Star Wars Special" episodes' winners received a travel for family (episodes 19–22) or the Han-u sets (episodes 27–28) as gift.) (Note: Special appearances via video by UP10TION, Mamamoo, Jinyoung (Got7), Park Bo-ram and Parc Jae-jung on episode 19.)	Kim Bum-soo, Jang Yun-jeong, DinDin, Kim Eana, Park Mi-sun, Oh My Girl (Hyojung, YooA)	Yang Hee-eun	"Gumi's Michael Jackson" Hwang Chi-yeul, "Hapjeong-dong's Roundhouse kick" Koo Jun-hoe (iKON), "Dadaepo Flower Shop's Bachelor" Sandeul (B1A4), "Uljin Corner Shop's Granddaughter" Yoo Yeon-jung (Cosmic Girls), "Gimpo Baker King" Kim Young-ho Song: Hangyeryeong (한계령)	Koo Jun-hoe, Sandeul, Hwang Chi-yeul Song: Flower Vase (꽃병)	Sandeul	The Mountain Peak (봉우리) (Original: Kim Min-ki)	169
19–20 (August 6, 2017) (August 13, 2017); Star Wars Special	Kim Jun-hyun, Bada, Yang Yo-seob, Yoon Il-sang, Oh My Girl (Seunghee, Binnie)	Gummy	"Australia 400:1" Rosé (Blackpink), "Yongin Wolcheok Man" Yook Sung-jae (BtoB), "Heukseok-dong Rock Fatso" Kim Jun-hyun, "Busan Resigned Goddess" Park Gi-ryang, "Hannam-dong Housekeeper Son" Son Jun-ho Song: Childish Adult (어른 아이)	Son Jun-ho, Rosé, Yook Sung-jae Song: Please Forget Me (날 그만 잊어요)	Yook Sung-jae	Memory Loss (기억상실)	176
19–20 (August 6, 2017) (August 13, 2017); Star Wars Special	Special	Gummy & Cheetah				Stop Talking (그만 말해)	
21–22 (August 20, 2017) (August 27, 2017); Star Wars Special (Note: Special appearances via video by Son Hyun-joo, Nam Jin, Daesung (Big Bang), Kim Kwang-kyu, Cha Ji-yeon, Kei (Lovelyz) and Kim Heung-gook on episode 21; Snuper, KNK, Exo, Jeon So-min, Cultwo, Laboum and Red Velvet on episode 22.)	Kim Jun-hyun, Bada, Yang Yo-seob, Yoon Il-sang, Astro (MJ, JinJin, Cha Eunwoo, Rocky)	Turbo	"Ilsan Newborn Aerobic" Park Seul-gi, "New York Black Pen Teacher" Jessi, "London Cats Girl" Shannon, "Wangsimni Bowling Prince" Lee Hong-gi (F.T. Island), "Yeoksam-dong Water Muscle Boys" Sleepy (Untouchable) & DinDin Song: Love Is... (3+3=0)	Jessi, Lee Hong-gi, Sleepy & DinDin Song: Some Jazz Bar (어느 째즈바)	Lee Hong-gi	Reminiscence (December) (회상)	165
21–22 (August 20, 2017) (August 27, 2017); Star Wars Special	Kim Bum-soo, DinDin, Kim Eana, Oh My Girl (Hyojung, Binnie), Astro (Moon Bin, Yoon Sanha)	Jang Yun-jeong	"Ilsan Shampoo's Fairy" Park Wan-kyu, "Gaepo-dong Drunk Guitar" Roy Kim, "Ulsan Mom's Seaweed" Kim Young-chul, "Yongin Super Mom Pie" Kim Ji-woo, "Chuncheon Folk Song" Hyun Seung-hee (Oh My Girl) Song: Later Later (이따이따요)	Park Wan-kyu, Roy Kim, Kim Young-chul Song: Flower (꽃)	Roy Kim	First Love (첫사랑)	169
21–22 (August 20, 2017) (August 27, 2017); Star Wars Special	Special	Kim Yeon-ja	"Seongsu-dong Flaming Newlywed Wife" Bada, "Geumho-dong How Do You Do" Jun Hyun-moo, "Bundang Yeon-woo's Mom" Jang Yun-jeong Song: Amor Fati (아모르 파티)		Jang Yun-jeong	Mercury Lamp (수은등)	
21–22 (August 20, 2017) (August 27, 2017); Star Wars Special	Special	Kim Jong-kook (Turbo) & Lee Soo-hyun (Akdong Musician)				Addiction (중독)	
23–24 (September 3, 2017) (September 10, 2017)	Kim Jun-hyun, Bada, Park Seul-gi, U Sung-eun, Weki Meki (Suyeon, Yoojung, Doyeon, Lucy)	Baek Ji-young	"Bucheon Dimple Innocence" Heo Eun-gyeol, "Busan Vegetable Shop King Mother" Jang Ji-eun, "Suwon Bank Body Guard" Kwak Hyun-min, "Daejeon Taxi Driver's Youngest Daughter" Lee Ja-hyun, "Myeonmok-dong Chungmu Elementary School's "Dung Dogs" Teacher" Park Han-byul Song: Like Being Shot by a Bullet (총 맞은 것처럼)	Jang Ji-eun, Kwak Hyun-min, Heo Eun-gyeol Song: Dash	Jang Ji-eun	Don't Forget (잊지 말아요)	163
23–24 (September 3, 2017) (September 10, 2017)	Kim Bum-soo, Jang Yun-jeong, DinDin, Kim Eana, Winner (Seunghoon, Seungyoon)	Taeyang	"Suwon Dunk Shoot" Kim Ji-seok, "Kyung Hee University Taeyang Girlfriend" Sung Ji-won, "France Sweety 18-year-old" Rulia, "Busan Pacific Ocean Marine Engineer" Park Ji-hoon, "Incheon VIP Abdominal Muscles Queen" Hwang Hye-in Song: Eyes, Nose, Lips (눈, 코, 입)	Sung Ji-won, Rulia, Kim Ji-seok Song: Only Look at Me (나만 바라봐)	Kim Ji-seok	Darling	168
23–24 (September 3, 2017) (September 10, 2017)	Special	Han Young-ae & Baek Ji-young				Is Anyone There? (누구 없소)	
23–24 (September 3, 2017) (September 10, 2017)	Special	Taeyang (again stage)				Wake Me Up	
25–26 (September 17, 2017) (September 24, 2017) (Note: Special appearances via video by Raymon Kim as one of Johan Kim's BEST 8 on episode 25; Moon Hee-joon, Tony An and Lee Jae-won on episode 26.)	Kim Bum-soo, Jang Yun-jeong, DinDin, Son Jun-ho, UV, Oh My Girl (Hyojung, Seunghee, Jiho, Binnie)	Johan Kim	"Jamsil Cappuccino Gentleman" Kim Yong-ho, "Sobaeksan Han-u Virgin" Jung In-ji, "Incheon Swag Iron Bag" Kim Seok-geun, "Chungbuk Flaming Jukkumi Girl" Ahn Hye-jin, "Cheongju Department Store Handsome Man" Kim Dong-gyu Song: Holding The End Of This Night (이 밤의 끝을 잡고) (Original: Solid)	Ahn Hye-jin, Kim Seok-geun, Jung In-ji Song: Soul Mates (천생연분) (Original: Solid)	Jung In-ji	I Want to Fall in Love (사랑에 빠지고 싶다)	168
25–26 (September 17, 2017) (September 24, 2017)	Kim Jun-hyun, Bada, Yang Yo-seob, Kim Eana, Park Seul-gi, UP10TION (Jinhoo, Kuhn, Kogyeol, Sunyoul)	Kangta	"Busan H.O.T. Sewing Machine" Jo Hyun-rang, "Daegu Cosmetic Shop's Director Heo" Heo Pil-ryung, "Kyung Hee University Viola Goddess" Yoon Bo-ra, "Yang Yo-seob's Younger Cousin" Kim Jae-ho, "Gimpo Preparatory Science Teacher" Lee Jeong-won Song: Hope (빛) (Original: H.O.T.)	Kim Jae-ho, Yoon Bo-ra, Jo Hyun-rang Song: I Swear (Original: S)	Jo Hyun-rang	Polaris (북극성)	152
25–26 (September 17, 2017) (September 24, 2017)	Special	Johan Kim & UV				Only My Friend (나만의 친구) (Original: Solid)	
25–26 (September 17, 2017) (September 24, 2017)	Special	Kangta & Red Velvet (Seulgi, Wendy)				Doll (인형)	
25–26 (September 17, 2017) (September 24, 2017)	Special	Johan Kim & Jo Hyun-ah (Urban Zakapa) (again stage)				Love Is Late, I'm Sorry (사랑이 늦어서 미안해)	
27–28 (October 1, 2017) (October 8, 2017); Chuseok Special; Star Wars Special (Note: Special appearances via video by Hyun Sook, Red Velvet (Seulgi, Wendy), Lee Yoon-ji and Kim So-hyun on episode 27; K.Will, Muzie (UV), Jo Se-ho, Lena Park and Johan Kim on episode 28.)	Kim Jun-hyun, Bada, Yang Yo-seob, Kim Eana, Park Seul-gi, Jeon Bong-jin, Zhang Yu'an	Wheesung	"Anyang Anger Rage" Niel (Teen Top), "Huam-dong Sensitive Gardener" Lee Min-ho, "LA Dancing Board" Samuel, "Ilsan Figure Fairy" Yuju (GFriend), "Dangsan-dong Sen Unni" Hyun Jyu-ni Song: Can't We (..안 되나요...)	Hyun Jyu-ni, Niel, Yuju Song: Insomnia (불면증) (Korean version) (Original: Craig David)	Yuju	Even Thought of Marriage (결혼까지 생각했어)	168
27–28 (October 1, 2017) (October 8, 2017); Chuseok Special; Star Wars Special	Kim Bum-soo, Jang Yun-jeong, DinDin, Yoon Il-sang, Son Jun-ho, Park Gi-ryang	Park Hyun-bin	"Haeundae Mermaid Princess" Lizzy (After School/Orange Caramel), "Tongyeong Oyster Hunter" Heo Kyung-hwan, "Gwangju Shooting Star" Lee Gi-kwang (HIGHLIGHT), "Geumho-dong Beginner Dad" Park Gwang-hyun, "Hamgyong-do Oriole" Lee So-yool Song: Dead Drunk (곤드레 만드레)	Lizzy, Park Gwang-hyun, Lee Gi-kwang Song: Believe Only Brother (오빠만 믿어)	Lee Gi-kwang	Shabang Shabang (샤방샤방)	162
27–28 (October 1, 2017) (October 8, 2017); Chuseok Special; Star Wars Special	Special	Wheesung & Killagramz				Love Is Delicious (사랑은 맛있다)	
29–30 (October 22, 2017) (October 29, 2017)	Kim Bum-soo, Jang Yun-jeong, DinDin, Kim Eana, Narsha (Brown Eyed Girls), Kim Ji-sook, PENTAGON (Jinho, Hui, Hongseok)	Roo'ra	"Nowon Burning Bicycle" Choi Jeong-hwa, "Jincheon Awesome Mosquito Net" Lee Young-dong, "Daegu Kyung Hwa Girls High's Lucky Charm" Song Joo-yeon, "Paju Smart Delivery Girl" Lee Hyun, "Gimcheon Welfare Angel" Jeon Won-il Song: The Angel Who Lost Wings (날개 잃은 천사)	Jeon Won-il, Lee Hyun, Song Joo-yeon Song: The Lover (연인)	Lee Hyun	3!4!	164
29–30 (October 22, 2017) (October 29, 2017)	Kim Jun-hyun, Bada, Yang Yo-seob, Yoon Il-sang, Park Seul-gi, KNK (Youjin, Seungjun, Inseong)	So Chan-whee	"Sangsu-dong Bartender Oriental Doctor" Kim Byung-gyu, "Cheongju Military Music School's Sergeant Song" Song Woo-seok, "Transportation University's High-pitched Captain" Kim Jin, "Busan Repair Shop's Needle Vocal Cords" Choi Woo-sung, "Gimcheon Grapes Lady" Kim Mi-jin Song: Tears	Kim Jin, Song Woo-seok, Kim Mi-jin Song: Chance to Farewell (헤어지는 기회)	Kim Jin	A Smart Choice (현명한 선택)	172
29–30 (October 22, 2017) (October 29, 2017)	Special	2017 BROS (Roo'ra, Narsha, Sleepy, Kim Ji-sook, DinDin, KNK, PENTAGON)				Win Win; Abracadabra	
29–30 (October 22, 2017) (October 29, 2017)	Special	So Chan-whee & Park Wan-kyu				No Choice But to Let You Go (보낼 수 밖에 없는 난); Love over Thousand Years (천년의 사랑)	
31–32 (November 5, 2017) (November 12, 2017)	Kim Bum-soo, Jang Yun-jeong, DinDin, Yoon Il-sang, Son Jun-ho, Oh My Girl (Hyojung, Seunghee)	Jinusean	"Sinyongsan Elementary's English Teacher Tom" Kim Dae-sol, "Namyangju Guardian Angel" Yoon Sol, "Jamsil Victory's Goddess" Do Jeong-eun, "Yongsan Electronic Shop's Task Leader" Seol Jeong-geun, "Yeongdeungpo Hot Chicken Girl" Choi Eun-hye Song: Phone Number (전화번호)	Yoon Sol, Seol Jeong-geun, Choi Eun-hye Song: How Deep Is Your Love	Choi Eun-hye	Tell Me (말해줘)	181
31–32 (November 5, 2017) (November 12, 2017)	Kim Jun-hyun, Bada, Yang Yo-seob, Kim Eana, Park Seul-gi, Oh My Girl (Jiho, Binnie)	Hyolyn	"Asan Rice Millionaire" Jeon Yong-il, "Nonhyeon-dong's Dad is a Cook King" Choi Shi-young, "Sillim-dong David" Joo Jae-woo, "Mokpo Navy Fleet's Corporal Go" Go Jong-beom, "Music Copyright Association's New Recruit" Kang Min-soo Song: Crazy of You (미치게 만들어) (Master's Sun OST)	Choi Shi-young, Jeon Yong-il, Joo Jae-woo Song: Let It Go (Korean & Original version)	Joo Jae-woo	Gone Not Around Any Longer (있다 없으니까) (Original: Sistar19)	169
31–32 (November 5, 2017) (November 12, 2017)	Special	Jinusean & Eun Ji-won (Sechs Kies)				A-Yo; Oppa's Car (오빠차)	
31–32 (November 5, 2017) (November 12, 2017)	Special	Hyolyn & Got7				Blue Moon (블루문)	
33 (November 19, 2017); Last Ticket Special	Kim Jun-hyun, Bada, Yang Yo-seob, Kim Eana, UP10TION (Jinhoo, Kuhn, Kogyeol, Sunyoul)	Baek Ji-young	"Hoengseong Han-u Universal Big Star" Heechul (Super Junior), "Mokpo Cosmetic Sale King" Park Jin-joo, "Gwangyang One-sided Show Host" Lee Min-woong Song: Sad Salsa + Dash		Kim Hee-chul	Candy in My Ears (내 귀에 캔디)	183
33 (November 19, 2017); Last Ticket Special	Kim Jun-hyun, Bada, Yang Yo-seob, Kim Eana, UP10TION (Jinhoo, Kuhn, Kogyeol, Sunyoul)	Baek Ji-young	(see in episodes 23–24)		Jang Ji-eun	I Won't Love (사랑 안해)	183
33 (November 19, 2017); Last Ticket Special	Kim Bum-soo, Jang Yun-jeong, DinDin, Yoon Il-sang, Gugudan (Mimi, Hana, Nayoung, Hyeyeon)	Ailee	"Gimje Archery Chignon Girl" Kim Se-jeong (Gugudan), "Yangjae-dong Meal Teacher Park" Parc Jae-jung, "Sungkyunkwan University's Juliet" Kim Nam-joo (Apink) Song: Don't Touch Me (손대지마)		Kim Se-jeong	If You	178
33 (November 19, 2017); Last Ticket Special	Kim Bum-soo, Jang Yun-jeong, DinDin, Yoon Il-sang, Gugudan (Mimi, Hana, Nayoung, Hyeyeon)	Ailee	(see in episodes 7–8)		Sung Han-joon	Higher	178

==== List of Finalists ====
– The finalists participated in the Final Concert

Pair #	Episodes	Singer	Participant	Score
1	1–2	Lee Moon-se	"Cheonan Romantic Guitar" Hwang Joo-myung	182
2	3–4	Kim Bum-soo	"Gangneung Draft Beer's Part-time Staff" Kwon Ah-young	156
3	5–6	Lee Jae-hoon	"Hapcheon Earthenware Pot" Park Min-seon	175
4	7–8	Insooni	"Bongcheon-dong Climacteric" Kim Yoon-jeong	175
5	9–10	Psy	"Busan Special Warrior Delivery" Bang Ji-hwan	169
6	11–12	Kim Yeon-woo	"Busan Convenience Store Oppa" Moon Jong-min	189
7	13–14	Daesung	"Hongseong Housewife Ssireum King" Kim Kyung-ah	129
8	15–16	Lee Eun-mi	"Paju High's 2nd Grade's Emotional Leader" Jang Ye-jin	159
9	17–18	Park Mi-kyung	"Daehangno Ticket King" Lee Ji-young	169
10	19–20	Gummy	"Yongin Wolcheok Man" Yook Sung-jae (BtoB)	176
11	21–22	Jang Yun-jeong	"Gaepo-dong Drunk Guitar" Roy Kim	169
12	23–24	Taeyang	"Suwon Dunk Shoot" Kim Ji-seok	168
13	25–26	Johan Kim	"Sobaeksan Han-u Virgin" Jung In-ji	168
14	27–28	Wheesung	"Ilsan Figure Fairy" Yuju (GFriend)	168
15	29–30	So Chan-whee	"Transportation University's High-pitched Captain" Kim Jin	172
16	31–32	Jinusean	"Yeongdeungpo Hot Chicken Girl" Choi Eun-hye	181
17	33	Baek Ji-young	"Hoengseong Han-u Universal Big Star" Kim Hee-chul (Super Junior)	183
17	33	Baek Ji-young	"Busan Vegetable Shop King Mother" Jang Ji-eun	183

==== Final Concert ====
Note: Only 9 of 18 finalists participated in the Final Concert whose King of Kings' Final MVP's participant received a car as prize. The voting time for King of Kings' Final MVP was effectuated after three main performances of each round, the last result was announced at the end of episode 36 without scores' publishing.

Episode # (Air Date) References	Panel	Stage Order	Finalists / Special Guests		Final Duo Song / Special Song
Episode # (Air Date) References	Panel	Stage Order	Singer	Participant	Final Duo Song / Special Song
34 (November 26, 2017); Round 1: "Mother's Dream"	Kim Jun-hyun, Jang Yun-jeong, Yang Yo-seob, DinDin, Yoon Il-sang, Son Jun-ho	Opening	"Bongcheon-dong Climacteric" Kim Yoon-jeong, "Daehangno Ticket King" Lee Ji-young, "Busan Vegetable Shop King Mother" Jang Ji-eun		My Friend (친구여) (Original: Cho PD & Insooni)
34 (November 26, 2017); Round 1: "Mother's Dream"	Kim Jun-hyun, Jang Yun-jeong, Yang Yo-seob, DinDin, Yoon Il-sang, Son Jun-ho	Round 1.1	Insooni	"Bongcheon-dong Climacteric" Kim Yoon-jeong	To Daughter (딸에게); Passion (열정) (feat. DinDin)
34 (November 26, 2017); Round 1: "Mother's Dream"	Kim Jun-hyun, Jang Yun-jeong, Yang Yo-seob, DinDin, Yoon Il-sang, Son Jun-ho	Round 1.2	Park Mi-kyung	"Daehangno Ticket King" Lee Ji-young	Warning of the Eve (이브의 경고)
34 (November 26, 2017); Round 1: "Mother's Dream"	Kim Jun-hyun, Jang Yun-jeong, Yang Yo-seob, DinDin, Yoon Il-sang, Son Jun-ho	Round 1.3	Baek Ji-young	"Busan Vegetable Shop King Mother" Jang Ji-eun	That Woman (그 여자)
34 (November 26, 2017); Round 1: "Mother's Dream"	Kim Jun-hyun, Jang Yun-jeong, Yang Yo-seob, DinDin, Yoon Il-sang, Son Jun-ho	Special	Psy & 40 Fantastic Duo (participants)		It's Art (예술이야)
35 (December 3, 2017); Round 2: "Youth Generation"	Kim Jun-hyun, Jang Yun-jeong, Yang Yo-seob, DinDin, Yoon Il-sang, Son Jun-ho	Opening	Baek Ji-young & Kim Jun-hyun		Candy in My Ears (내 귀에 캔디)
35 (December 3, 2017); Round 2: "Youth Generation"	Kim Jun-hyun, Jang Yun-jeong, Yang Yo-seob, DinDin, Yoon Il-sang, Son Jun-ho	Special	"Yeongdeungpo Hot Chicken Girl" Choi Eun-hye, "Gangneung Draft Beer Girl" Kwon Ah-young		Listen (Original: Beyoncé)
35 (December 3, 2017); Round 2: "Youth Generation"	Kim Jun-hyun, Jang Yun-jeong, Yang Yo-seob, DinDin, Yoon Il-sang, Son Jun-ho	Round 2.1	So Chan-whee	"Transportation University's High-pitched Captain" Kim Jin	Tears (feat. She's Gone of Steelheart)
35 (December 3, 2017); Round 2: "Youth Generation"	Kim Jun-hyun, Jang Yun-jeong, Yang Yo-seob, DinDin, Yoon Il-sang, Son Jun-ho	Round 2.2	Jinusean	"Yeongdeungpo Hot Chicken Girl" Choi Eun-hye	Tell Me One More Time (한 번 더 말해줘) (feat. Hot Stuff of Donna Summer)
35 (December 3, 2017); Round 2: "Youth Generation"	Kim Jun-hyun, Jang Yun-jeong, Yang Yo-seob, DinDin, Yoon Il-sang, Son Jun-ho	Round 2.3	Kim Bum-soo	"Gangneung Draft Beer Girl" Kwon Ah-young	Promise (약속)
35 (December 3, 2017); Round 2: "Youth Generation"	Kim Jun-hyun, Jang Yun-jeong, Yang Yo-seob, DinDin, Yoon Il-sang, Son Jun-ho	Special	Insooni		Habanera (Opera Carmen OST)
35 (December 3, 2017); Round 2: "Youth Generation"	Kim Jun-hyun, Jang Yun-jeong, Yang Yo-seob, DinDin, Yoon Il-sang, Son Jun-ho	Special	Lee Eun-mi		Send In the Clowns (Musical A Little Night Music OST)
36 (December 10, 2017); Round 3: "The Singer I Love"	Kim Jun-hyun, Jang Yun-jeong, Yang Yo-seob, DinDin, Yoon Il-sang, Son Jun-ho	Opening	Jinusean & Zion.T		Gasoline (가솔린); Hip Hop Gentlemen (멋쟁이 신사) (Original: YG Family); Phone Number (전화번호)
36 (December 10, 2017); Round 3: "The Singer I Love"	Kim Jun-hyun, Jang Yun-jeong, Yang Yo-seob, DinDin, Yoon Il-sang, Son Jun-ho	Special	"Busan Special Warrior Delivery" Bang Ji-hwan		Paradise (3마이) (Original: Psy ft. Lee Jae-hoon)
36 (December 10, 2017); Round 3: "The Singer I Love"	Kim Jun-hyun, Jang Yun-jeong, Yang Yo-seob, DinDin, Yoon Il-sang, Son Jun-ho	Special	"Cheonan Romantic Guitar" Hwang Joo-myung		A Little Girl (소녀) (Original: Lee Moon-se)
36 (December 10, 2017); Round 3: "The Singer I Love"	Kim Jun-hyun, Jang Yun-jeong, Yang Yo-seob, DinDin, Yoon Il-sang, Son Jun-ho	Special	"Paju High's 2nd Grade's Emotional Leader" Jang Ye-jin		We're Breaking Up (헤어지는 중입니다) (Original: Lee Eun-mi)
36 (December 10, 2017); Round 3: "The Singer I Love"	Kim Jun-hyun, Jang Yun-jeong, Yang Yo-seob, DinDin, Yoon Il-sang, Son Jun-ho	Round 3.1	Lee Eun-mi	"Paju High's 2nd Grade's Emotional Leader" Jang Ye-jin	World's Biggest Pygmy (세상에서 가장 큰 피그미)
36 (December 10, 2017); Round 3: "The Singer I Love"	Kim Jun-hyun, Jang Yun-jeong, Yang Yo-seob, DinDin, Yoon Il-sang, Son Jun-ho	Round 3.2	Psy	"Busan Special Warrior Delivery" Bang Ji-hwan	Napal Baji (나팔바지)
36 (December 10, 2017); Round 3: "The Singer I Love"	Kim Jun-hyun, Jang Yun-jeong, Yang Yo-seob, DinDin, Yoon Il-sang, Son Jun-ho	Round 3.3	Lee Moon-se	"Cheonan Romantic Guitar" Hwang Joo-myung	Ode to Gwanghwamun (광화문 연가)
36 (December 10, 2017); Round 3: "The Singer I Love"	Kim Jun-hyun, Jang Yun-jeong, Yang Yo-seob, DinDin, Yoon Il-sang, Son Jun-ho	Final Result	Best Singers' Fantastic Duo (Note: Best Singers' Fantastic Duo received a pair of Tissot watches as prize.) "Cheonan Romantic Guitar" Hwang Joo-myung King of Kings' Final MVP (Note: King of Kings' Final MVP's participant received a car as prize.); Psy & "Busan Special Warrior Delivery" Bang Ji-hwan		

==== Fantastic Memory ====
This special episode was broadcast on December 17, 2017, included the director's cut and the highlights of both two seasons.

Theme	Season #	Episode #	Performers	Song
Director's Cut (Note: This parts weren't broadcast on television in the regular episodes.)	2	Final Concert	Kim Bum-soo & Dynamic Duo	Good Love
Director's Cut	2	11–12	Kim Yeon-woo & Lee Seok-hoon (SG Wannabe)	Farewell Taxi (이별택시)
Director's Cut	2	27–28	Park Hyun-bin & Forte di Quattro	"Kim Kwang-seok Medley": Those Days (그날들); Stand Up (일어나); Because of the Thing Called Love (사랑이라는 이유로)
Fantastic 1:3 Match	2	2	Lee So-ra & Top 3 ("Daejeon Gyeryongsan Popeye" Lee Min-gwan, "Andong Downtown Star" Son Jeong-soo, "Park Bo-gum's Best Friend Hwan-ji" Jo Hwan-ji)	Wind is Blowing (바람이 분다)
Fantastic 1:3 Match	1	13	Kim Gun-mo & Top 3 ("Masan Sulli" Kim Hye-in, "Yongdap-dong Ssen Unnie" Kwon Do-yeon, "Sadang-dong PC Room's Woman" Lee Soo-jeong)	Wrongful Encounter (잘못된 만남)
Fantastic Collaboration	2	22	Jang Yun-jeong & Roy Kim	First Love (첫사랑)
Fantastic Collaboration	2	4	Lena Park & Song So-hee	If I Leave (나 가거든) (Original: Sumi Jo)
Fantastic Collaboration	2	9	Psy & IU	What Would Have Been? (어땠을까) (Original: Psy ft. Lena Park)
Fantastic Collaboration	1	13	Yang Hee-eun & Akdong Musician	From Mother to Daughter (엄마가 딸에게)
Fantastic Final	1	28	Lee Moon-se & "Wonil Middle's Cosmos" Kim Yoon-hee	Only the Sound of Her Laughter (그녀의 웃음소리뿐)
Fantastic Final	1	10	Lee Sun-hee & "Sweet 18-year-old Lady Ye-jin" Kim Ye-jin	Beautiful Country (아름다운 강산)
Fantastic Final	1	2	Taeyang & "Daejeon Rhythm Gangster" Lee Seo-jin	Eyes, Nose, Lips (눈, 코, 입)

==== Notes (Season 2) ====
- For the guests' first choices after the "random play" round (episodes 1–4), the participant with * after their name is the simultaneous choice of the guests, at this time that participant have the option of going to which guest's team they want.
- The special participant is the previous episodes' participant but wasn't the singer's last choice, he/she will directly come to the "Random Competition" round not through selection like others.
- Other notes:

== Ratings ==
=== Season 1 ===
List of ratings in season 1

Episode #	Broadcast Date	TNmS Ratings	AGB Ratings
Pilot	February 9, 2016		8.4%
1	April 17, 2016	6.0%	5.9%
2	April 24, 2016	5.8%	6.4%
3	May 1, 2016	6.2%	5.9%
4	May 8, 2016	4.5%	5.2%
5	May 15, 2016	5.2%	5.8%
6	May 22, 2016	5.1%	4.9%
7	May 29, 2016	4.7%	5.7%
8	June 5, 2016	3.7%	4.8%
9	June 12, 2016	5.6%	5.8%
10	June 19, 2016	5.5%	4.9%
11	June 26, 2016	4.7%	5.3%
12	July 3, 2016	5.0%	5.4%
13	July 10, 2016	5.9%	7.2%
14	July 17, 2016	5.4%	6.5%
15	July 24, 2016	5.7%	6.2%
16	July 31, 2016	5.0%	5.2%
17	August 7, 2016	5.3%	5.3%
18	August 14, 2016	5.5%	5.4%
19	August 21, 2016	4.6%	5.5%
20	August 28, 2016	5.2%	5.6%
21	September 4, 2016	5.3%	5.9%
22	September 11, 2016	5.6%	6.5%
23	September 18, 2016	7.5%	7.5%
24	September 25, 2016	6.4%	5.8%
25	October 2, 2016	5.6%	6.5%
26	October 9, 2016	4.8%	5.5%
27	October 23, 2016	5.1%	6.0%
28	November 6, 2016	3.9%	5.6%
29	November 13, 2016	5.3%	5.8%
30	November 20, 2016	5.1%	6.0%

=== Season 2 ===
List of ratings in season 2

Episode #	Broadcast Date	TNmS Ratings		AGB Ratings	
Episode #	Broadcast Date	Part 1	Part 2	Part 1	Part 2
1	March 26, 2017	4.5%	7.1%	4.7%	8.5%
2	April 2, 2017	3.9%	7.0%	3.9%	7.6%
3	April 9, 2017	4.5%	6.4%	4.4%	7.3%
4	April 16, 2017	4.5%	6.6%	3.7%	6.4%
5	April 30, 2017	3.4%	5.4%	3.0%	5.2%
6	May 7, 2017	2.9%	4.0%	3.5%	5.6%
7	May 14, 2017	5.9%	8.2%	5.5%	8.1%
8	May 21, 2017	4.3%	5.6%	4.0%	6.2%
9	May 28, 2017	6.4%	8.3%	6.6%	8.5%
10	June 4, 2017	5.7%	7.3%	6.0%	7.7%
11	June 11, 2017	4.8%	6.1%	5.2%	7.0%
12	June 18, 2017	5.1%	7.1%	5.7%	6.8%
13	June 25, 2017	5.4%	6.3%	5.9%	7.7%
14	July 2, 2017	5.5%	7.9%	5.9%	9.0%
15	July 9, 2017	5.1%	7.4%	5.1%	7.9%
16	July 16, 2017	4.6%	6.4%	4.6%	6.1%
17	July 23, 2017	6.2%	7.6%	6.4%	7.6%
18	July 30, 2017	5.6%	7.1%	5.0%	6.8%
19	August 6, 2017	4.5%	6.4%	5.2%	7.2%
20	August 13, 2017	4.7%	7.4%	5.3%	7.4%
21	August 20, 2017	5.8%	8.9%	5.9%	9.3%
22	August 27, 2017	5.2%	7.5%	5.6%	8.4%
23	September 3, 2017	5.8%	7.9%	6.7%	8.6%
24	September 10, 2017	7.0%	9.3%	7.9%	11.0%
25	September 17, 2017	6.2%	7.0%	6.3%	8.3%
26	September 24, 2017	6.9%	7.4%	6.5%	8.2%
27	October 1, 2017	5.9%	7.7%	6.8%	8.9%
28	October 8, 2017	4.9%	5.9%	5.2%	7.4%
29	October 22, 2017	6.2%	8.7%	5.6%	8.4%
30	October 29, 2017	6.7%	8.1%	6.8%	9.1%
31	November 5, 2017	5.6%	7.2%	5.2%	7.2%
32	November 12, 2017	5.7%	8.7%	5.8%	8.6%
33	November 19, 2017	6.6%	8.2%	7.7%	10.0%
34	November 26, 2017	8.1%	12.2%	8.8%	12.5%
35	December 3, 2017	7.9%	10.9%	8.4%	12.4%
36	December 10, 2017	7.3%	12.6%	8.2%	12.5%
Special	December 17, 2017	5.8%	10.5%	6.2%	10.7%

== Awards and nominations ==
Year	Award	Category	Recipient	Result
2016	10th SBS Entertainment Awards	Top Excellence Award in Talk Show	Kim Gun-mo	Won
2016	10th SBS Entertainment Awards	Excellence Award in Talk Show	Jun Hyun-moo	Won
2017	11th SBS Entertainment Awards	Excellence Award in Show/Talk Category	Kim Jun-hyun	Won
2017	11th SBS Entertainment Awards	Best MC Award	Jun Hyun-moo	Won
