= Chongju National College of Science and Technology =

1914–2006 technical college in South Korea

- 청주과학대학
- Active: 1914–2006
- Location: Cheongju, South Korea; 36.65262°N 127.49543°E
- Website: www.cjnc.ac.kr

- Chongju National College of Science and Technology
- Hangul: 청주과학대학
- Hanja: 淸州科學大學
- RR: Cheongju gwahak daehak
- MR: Ch'ŏngju kwahak taehak

Cheongju National College of Science and Technology (Korean: 청주과학대학) was a public technical college in South Korea. In 2006 it amalgamated with Chungju National University which later merged with Korea National Railroad College into Korea National University of Transportation in 2012.

The main campus is situated in Cheongju, which is the capital of North Chungcheong province. A satellite campus is located in Jeungpyeong County. The college employed about 60 professors.

== Academics ==
The school's offerings, loan modification which are entirely at the undergraduate level, are arranged under four divisions: Nursing and Health, Social Work, Industry, and Arts.

== History ==
The school was first founded in the early years of Japanese occupation. It was opened by the occupation government in April 1914, as the Cheongju Jahye Hospital Nursing and Infant Care Training Facility (청주 자혜의원 조산부 및 간호부 양성소), attached to Jahye Hospital. It was reorganized as a provincial three-year technical high school in 1948, continuing its emphasis on nursing and child care. It became a technical college in 1979, and its management was transferred from provincial to national authorities in 1983.

== See also ==
- List of colleges and universities in South Korea
- Education in South Korea
