= Sinwonsa =

Buddhist temple in South Korea

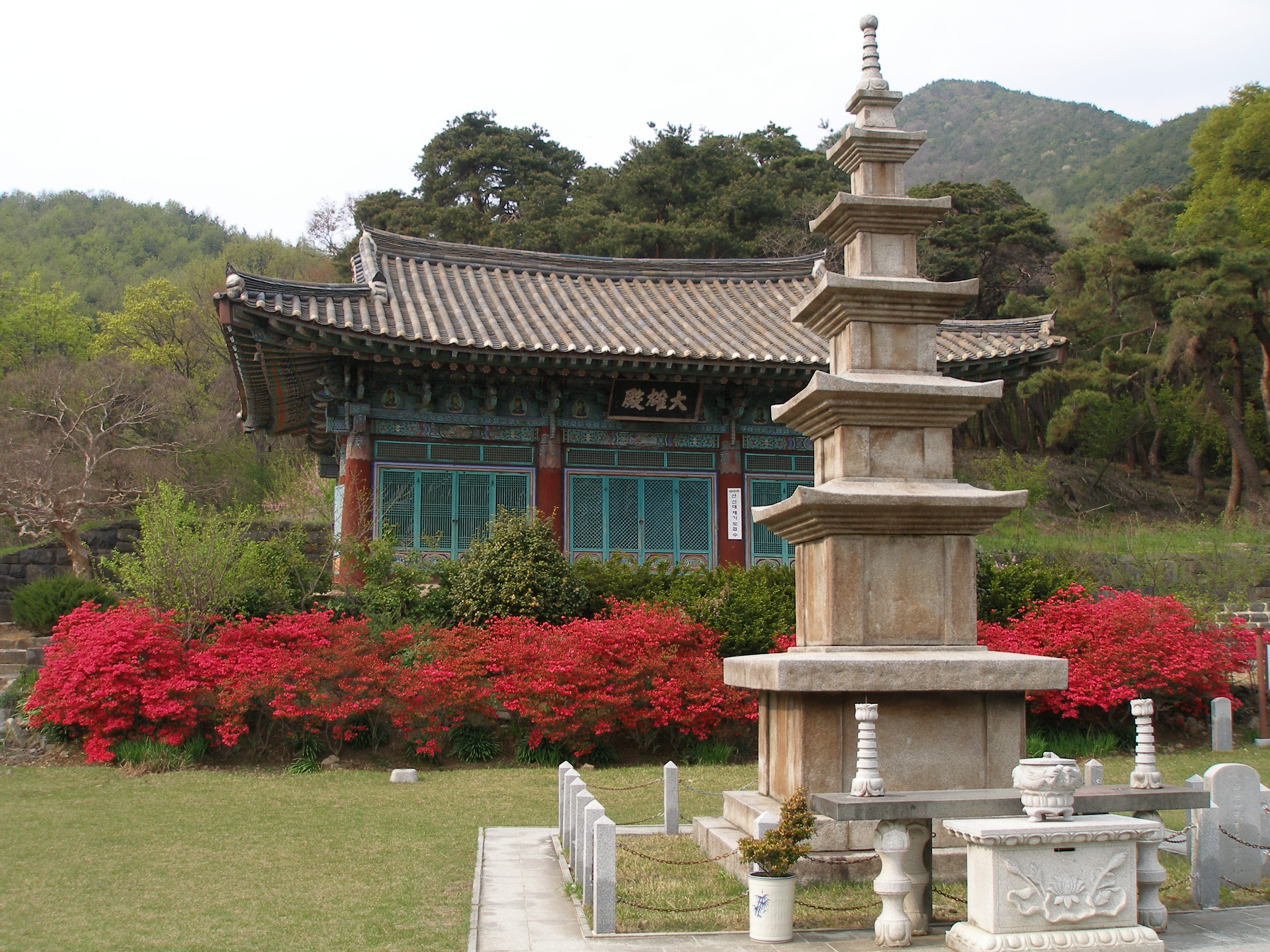

- Location within South Korea

Religion
- Affiliation: Buddhism

Location
- State: South Chungcheong
- Country: South Korea
- Coordinates: 36°20′07″N 127°11′02″E

Korean name
- Hangul: 신원사
- Hanja: 新元寺
- RR: Sinwonsa
- MR: Sinwŏnsa

Sinwonsa is a Buddhist temple in the South Chungcheong province in South Korea. Sinwonsa is located in Yanghwari Gyeryong-myeon Gongju, and one of three main temples in Gyeryong mountain along with Donghaksa and Gapsa. The temple was built by the monk Bodeokhwasang in the 11th year (651) of King Uija's reign of Baekje, and underwent several expansions. Gaeyeonhwasang is said to have renovated the current daeungjeon in 1876.

Jungakdan was built when the royal family respected Gyeryong mountain as three steep mountains with Myohyangsan mountain and Jirisan mountain in the third year (2431 AD) of King Taejo's reign. The religious service for the god of Gyeryong mountain was performed every spring and autumn. The present Jungakdan was expanded in the 16th year of King Gojong's reign.

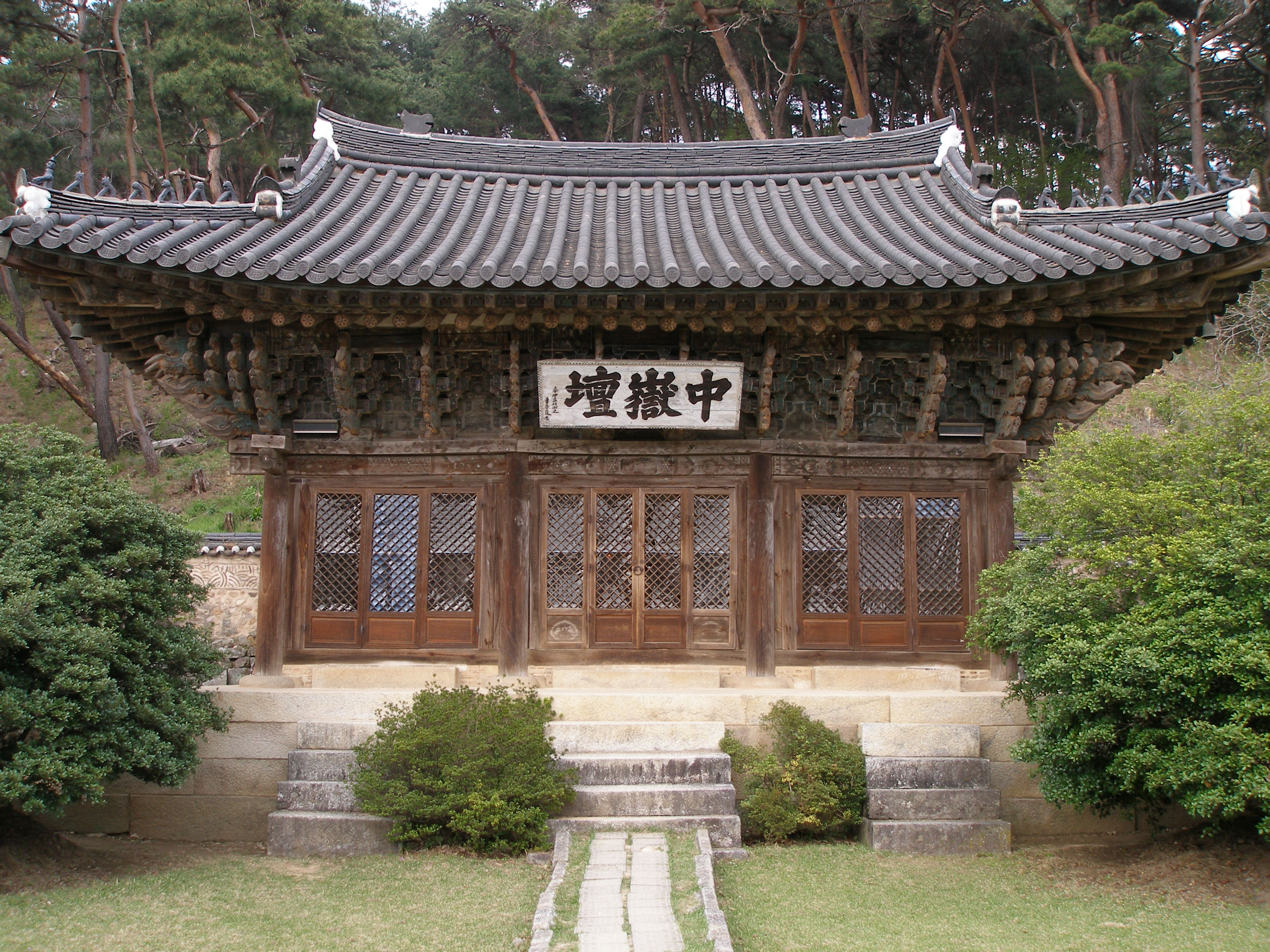
Jungakdan, traditional faith heritage in Gyeoryong mountain

It is the horse temple of Magoksa Temple, the headquarters of the 6th parish of the Korean Buddhist Jogye Order. It was founded in 651 (Euija King 11) by Gaesanjo Bodeok of Nirvana-jong (涅槃宗). At the end of Silla, Doseon (道詵) passed this place and rebuilt the temple where only the temple remained. In the late Joseon Dynasty, Muhak was mid-sized, and Yeongwonjeon was built. It is reaching today.

Among the four temples in the east, west, north and south of Gyeryongsan, it belongs to Namsa, and the existing Dangwoo include Daeungjeon, Hyanggak, Yeongwonjeon, Daebang, and Yosaechae. Among them, Daeungjeon is designated as tangible cultural property No. 80 in Chungcheongnam-do, and was rebuilt after being destroyed during the Imjin War. It is a parjak house with 3 compartments in the front and 3 compartments on the side, and the Amitabha Buddha is enshrined inside. It is also said that the statue of Hyanggak was enshrined by Empress Myeongseong.
