= Korea National University of Transportation =

University in Chungju, South Korea

- 한국교통대학교
- University Seal
- Motto: pursuit of truth future creation service to mankind
- Type: National
- Established: 2012
- President: Dr. Yoon Seong-Joe (Korean: 윤승조)
- Academic staff: 696
- Undergraduates: 12,130
- Postgraduates: 630
- Location: Chungju/Jeungpyeong County/Uiwang, South Korea; 36.96976°N 127.87133°E
- Campus: Suburban 861,033 square metres (9,268,080 sq ft) (Chungju Campus)
- Colors: Burgundy (main color): Blue: Silver:
- Website: www.ut.ac.kr/english.do

- Korea National University of Transportation
- Hangul: 한국교통대학교
- Hanja: 韓國交通大學校
- RR: Hanguk gyotong daehakgyo
- MR: Han'guk kyot'ong taehakkyo

The Korea National University of Transportation (KNUT; Korean: 한국교통대학교) is a public, national university in Chungju City, North Chungcheong province and Uiwang City, Gyeonggi province, South Korea. The university was created in 2012 by merging Chungju National University and Korea National Railroad College. Chungju National University was established in 1962 in Chungju, which is one of the public Universities that established after independence. Korea National University is the only public university specialized and focused their education and research on transportation and communication on top of Engineering and Technology. After merging with Korea National Railroad College, it has 3 campuses across Korea; main campus in Chungju, biotechnology and nursing campus in Jeongpeung and transportation and communication campus in Uiwang. It enrolls about 200 graduate and 8,000 undergraduate students, and employs about 332 professors.

As of 30 April 2023, the president of this university is Yoon Seong-Joe.

== History ==
The school opened in 1962 as Chungju Technical Junior College (충주공업초급대학), a two-year school. It became Chungju Technical College, offering a five-year program, in 1965, and was nationalized in 1971. However, it was returned to the status of a two-year junior college in 1974. It was moved to its present-day location in 1982. Eleven years later in 1993, it became a four-year university, Chungju National University of Industry. In March 2006 it merged Cheongju National College of Science and Technology (Jeungpyeong campus now).

== Academics ==
The university's undergraduate and graduate offerings are provided through its six colleges:

=== College of Convergence Technology (융합기술대학) ===
- School of Mechanical, Automotive and Aeronautical Engineering (기계자동차항공공학부)
- School of Electronic and Electrical Engineering (전자·전기공학부)
- School of Computer (컴퓨터학부)
- Department of AI Robot Engineering (AI로봇공학과)
- Department of Biomedical Engineering (바이오메디컬융합학과)

=== College of Engineering (공과대학) ===
- Division of Civil, Environmental & Urban-Transportation Engineering (건설환경도시교통공학부)
- School of Chemical and Materials Engineering (응용화학에너지공학부)
- School of Industrial Management and Safety Engineering (산업경영·안전공학부)
- School of Architecture (건축학부)
- Department of Design (디자인학부)

=== College of Humanities & Social Sciences (인문사회대학) ===
- School of Global Language & Literature (글로벌어문학부)
- School of Business, Trade & Social Welfare (경영·통상·복지학부)
- Division of Public Administration (행정학부)
- Department of music (음악학과)
- Department of Sports (스포츠학부)
- Department of Airline service (항공서비스학과)
- Department of Aeronautical Science & Flight Operation (항공운항학과)
- Department of Early Childhood Education (유아교육학과)
- Department of Media & Contents (미디어&콘텐츠학과)

=== College of Health and life Sciences (보건생명대학) ===
- Department of Nursing (간호학과)
- Division of Food Science & Biotechnology (식품생명학부)
- Department of Physical Therapy (물리치료학과)
- Department of Emergency Medical Service (응급구조학과)
- Department of Early Childhood Special Education (유아특수교육학과)
- Division of IT Application Convergence (IT응용융합학과)

=== College of Future Convergence (미래융합대학) ===
- Department of Smart Electrical Energy Engineering (스마트전기에너지공학과)
- Department of Civil and Environmental Convergence Engineering (건설환경융합공학과)
- Department of Safety Convergence Engineering (안전융합공학과)
- Department of Sport Welfare (스포츠복지학과)
- Department of SMART Railway and Transportation Engineering (스마트철도교통공학과)
- Department of Welfare and Management (복지·경영학과)

=== College of Railroad Sciences (철도대학) ===
This college is located in Uiwang and the entire campus is classified as one college. Additionally, it is the only one of the three campuses of KNUT that is located in the metropolitan area.

- School of Railroad Engineering (철도공학부)
- Department of Railroad Management and Logistics (철도경영·물류학과)
- Department of AI Data Engineering (AI데이터공학부)

The following three Schools or Divisions are independent and are not affiliated with the college:

- School of Liberal Arts and Sciences (교양학부)
- School of Liberal Studies (자유전공학부)
- Division of Creative Convergence (창의융합학부)

== Sister schools ==
The university maintains domestic sisterhood relationships with numerous institutions, including Korea's 19 other universities of industry. In addition, it has international ties with 30 universities in 15 countries: the United States (University of Sacramento), Bangladesh (University of Development Alternative), China (Beijing University of Technology, Yanbian University, Yanbian University of Science and Technology, Xuzhou Institute of Technology and Shanghai University), the Philippines (De La Salle University-Manila), Japan (Oita University and Kyushu Institute of Technology), Kazakhstan (Al-Farabi University and Pavlodar National University), Uzbekistanthe (Samarkand State Institute of Foreign Languages), India (University of Delhi), Canada (Nova Scotia Agricultural College), the United Kingdom (University of Westminster), and Australia (Deakin University).

== See also ==
- List of national universities in South Korea
- List of universities and colleges in South Korea
- Education in Korea
