= Wangsimni-dong =

District of Seoul, South Korea

- Hangul: 왕십리동
- Hanja: 往十里洞
- RR: Wangsimni-dong
- MR: Wangsimni-dong

Wangsimni-dong (Korean: 왕십리동) is a part of Seongdong, a district of Seoul, South Korea.
