= Korea National Railroad College =

1905–2012 university in Uiwang, South Korea

Korea National Railroad College was a national university located in Uiwang, South Korea. In 2012 it merged with Chungju National University to form the Korea National University of Transportation.
