= Miari =

Red-light district in Seoul, South Korea

Coordinates: 37.60334°N 127.02502°E

Mia-ri
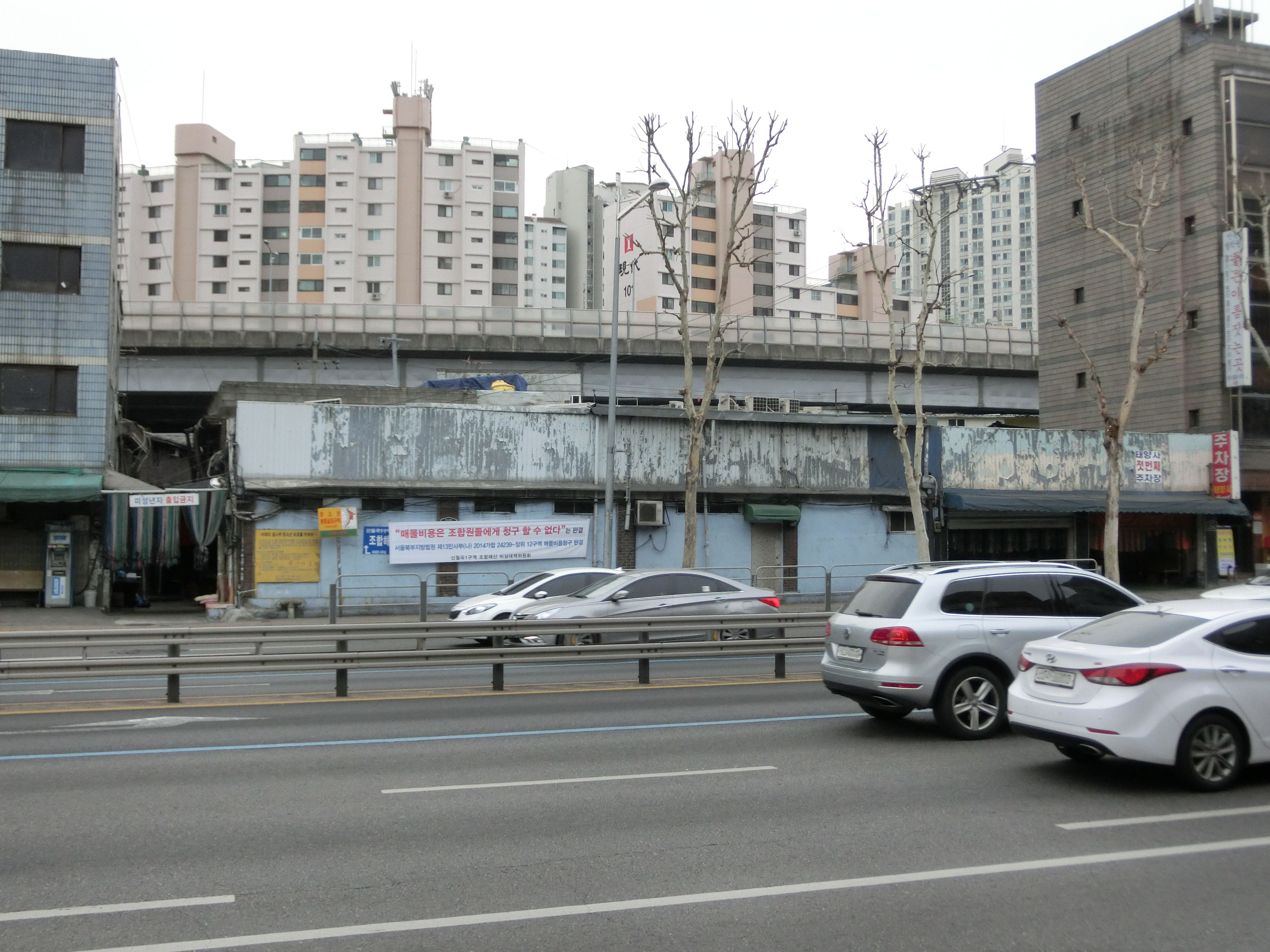
- Mia-ri
- Nicknames: Miari Texas, Texas Miari
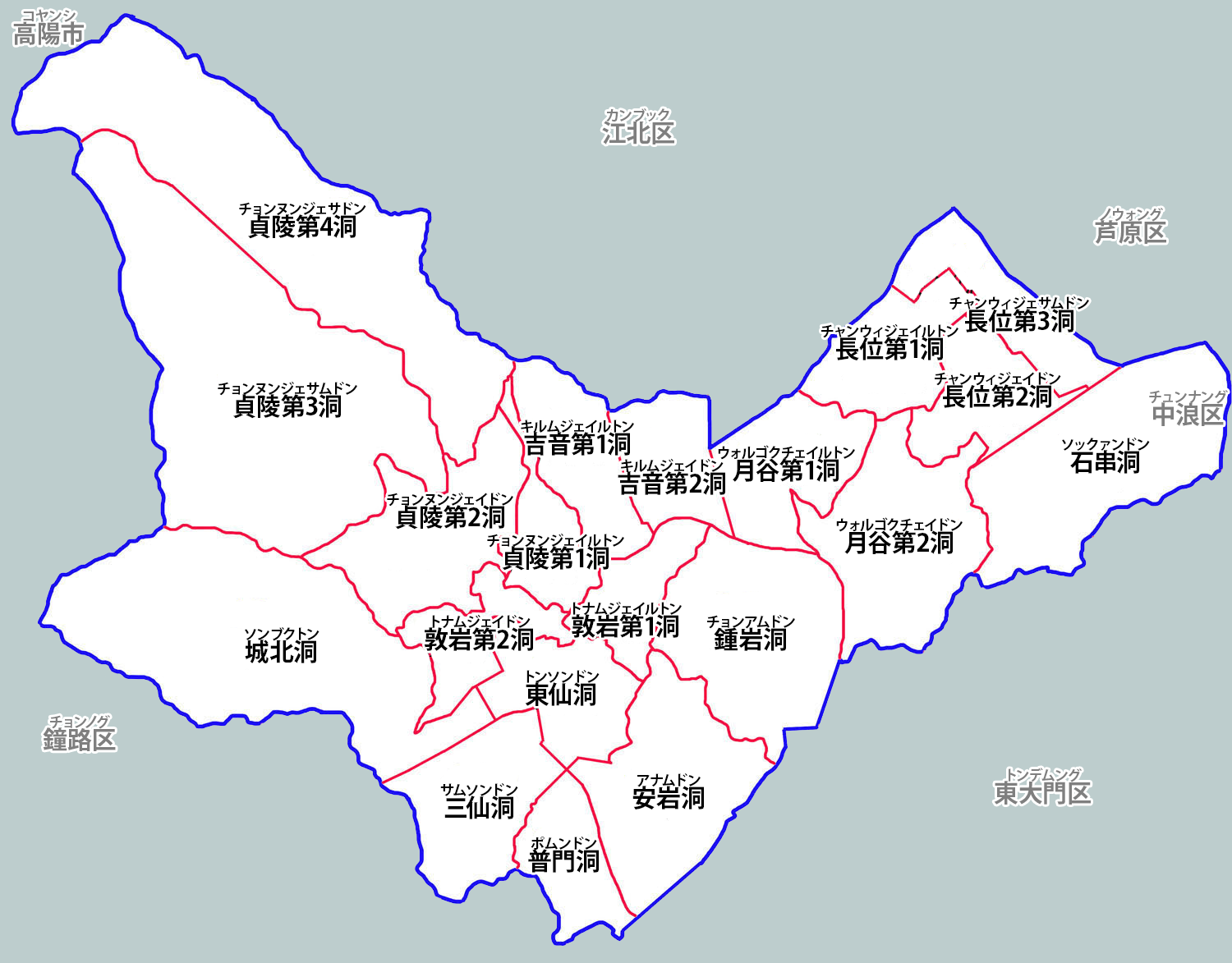
- Country: South Korea
- City: Seoul
- District: Seoungbuk

Mia-ri (Korean: 미아리) is one of largest red-light districts in northern Seoul, South Korea. Located in the Wolgok-dong, or Hawolgok-dong, and Sinwolgok 1 area at Gireum Station in the Seongbuk district, it is also known as Miari Texas or Texas Miari after the American servicemen that helped popularize the area, as well as Miari Hill. It was historically state-owned land aimed at ensuring the king's protection prior to the Joseon dynasty. The area is entered through a curtain at an alleyway entrance with several connected backstreets. The red-light district is located between the Jongam Intersection Police Box and exit 10 of the metropolitan Gileum train station. Before the severe crack down on brothels following the 2004 Anti-Prostitution Law, Miari was populated by many brothels, most with the window shop style. Although policing has cracked down heavily on the most visible forms or prostitution, Miari remains as an officially listed red-light district.

Miari was once South Korea's largest red-light district. However, modern redevelopment projects have quickly turned Miari into a more residential and official business neighborhood. The nation's sex industry has shifted online and scattered in more inconspicuous residential areas. Officially, it is still one of South Korea's 44 red-light districts according to government data from 2016.

== History ==
Leading up to the Joseon dynasty, Miari was a part of the king's territory within Outer old Seoul or Seongjeosimni. In 1912 leading up to official Japanese colonial rule, Miari became a cemetery ground with only 100 houses designated to tomb guards. Due to this, Miari became associated with death and maintained a historically unpleasant connotation. Following the Korean liberation from Japanese colonization, Miari became occupied by war refugees in makeshift shack settlements alongside the river. By 1936, the population had reached over 10,000 people. This population boom was due in part to the cheap rent and available land. By the late 1950s, the Korean government began demolishing many of the makeshift settlements. During this time, Miari was known as a “moon town,” as evicted residents could see the Moon while lying in the temporary residences created by the government. However, in December 1957, the United Nations Korean Reconstruction Agency alongside the Seoul Metropolitan Government created settlements in Miari aimed at housing 6,000 refugees, but were very poorly made due to their hasty construction. While the government tore down many of the makeshift settlements, Miari continued to be home to Seoul's poorer population until later government development.

Throughout the late 20th century, Miari took on large-scale redevelopment projects that have dramatically changed the area. In the mid-1960s, demolition and governmental crackdown in Jongsam led to around 1,600 prostitutes leaving the city, with many moving to Miari. By the 1970s, Miari was known for its hodgepodge, relocated residents. In 1985, the metropolitan subway opened, with a station in Miari, increasing its public accessibility. This led to it becoming a large tourist location, especially during the 1988 Olympic Games. The sudden influx of visitors led to many illegal construction and building expansions that has since made many of today's older buildings unsafe. In 2002, the New Town Project aimed at redeveloping the area with large-scale apartment complex planning. Many of Seoul's urban poor were forcibly relocated due to these developments or closed off from public view, especially Miari Texas Village, or its red-light district. Since then, the Seoul Metropolitan Government has increased development in Miari.

== Prostitution ==
Miari is infamous in South Korean culture for prostitution as it was once the largest red-light district. While prostitution was officially outlawed in 1961 by President Park Chung Hee, it continued to thrive in red-light districts, like Miari. President Park Chung Hee allowed red-light districts to continue operation as it helped circulate stable foreign currency and economic growth. In the 1980s, Miari's sex industry, and South Korea's in general, allowed for greater female economic mobility. In addition, the South Korean government lifted curfews during the 1970s and 1980s, which further accelerated the growth of Miari Texas within nightlife. Like many other large red-light districts, Miari was declared a “Youth Prohibition Zone.” Before this decree in the late 1990s, Miari women had to undergo compulsory health checkups aimed at preventing the spread of Sexually Transmitted Infections (STIs). By 2001, Miari was home to about 1,000 female sex workers employed at about 260 businesses according to police estimation. However, it is also believed that the actual numbers were much higher. Miari Texas’ alleyways were lined with brothels next to each other with glass doors. These brothels adopted Dutch red-light districts’ practice of using large glass windows to solicit customers. Sex workers would often sit in front of these windows wearing white dresses. Outside each of the buildings stands an ajumma, who tries to entice clients to enter. While brothels boomed during this time, many sex workers engaged in independent soliciting, or streetwalking in Miari Texas. Each brothel gained an estimated 5 million won, or US$6,613 by today's standards, every night in 2001. By 2002, 330,000 women worked in the sex industry, according to the National Survey on Prostitution Status and Economic Size. However, many events triggered the crackdown on Miari.

Due to international and internal pressure, the South Korean government took on more aggressive policies against the most visible forms of sex work. From 2002 to 2013 Miari was one of the 44 out of 69 red light districts left. Miari Texas continues to shrink due to continued redevelopment plans by the Seoul Metropolitan Government. As of January 2010, only recorded 136 prostitution establishments remain in Miari. While brothel-bound sex work still continues, businesses block windows to avoid police raiding. As of 2017, most of the remaining sex workers in Miari are reportedly in their late 30s to early 40s, which point towards Miari's prior boom in the late 20th century. Most modern prostitution tends toward scattered, underground groups and individuals or on the internet rather than clustered brothels.

== Policing ==
Even though prostitution was made illegal in 1961, police action was generally limited to the suppression of human trafficking and underage prostitution. In addition, due to economic benefits, red-light districts were purposefully overlooked. The police were often bribed by brothel owners. But this attitude ended in the early 2000s.

In January 2000, the Jongam district appointed a new police chief, Kim Kang Ja, Korea's first female police chief. Kang Ja claimed 80% of the area's 1,500 prostitutes were underage. She instigated many raids to try and eliminate underage prostitution receiving wide public support. Following a series of fires from 2000 to 2002, investigation revealed that many of the victims were sex workers who were trafficked and unable to escape since they were locked in their rooms sparking national outrage. At least 40 of the estimated 260 brothels were closed, and underage prostitution virtually eliminated in Miari.

In 2001, the United States classified Korea as Tier 3 for human trafficking, leading to international pressure on the South Korean government.

Kang Ja's crackdown precipitated a 50-day national anti-prostitution campaign and a change in the law.

By September 2004, South Korea passed the 2004 Anti-Prostitution Laws or the 2004 Special Act on Prevention of Prostitution, which define prostitution as a form of human trafficking. While over 500 sex workers in Miari protested this law—demanding job security and a grace period—, red-light districts across the country began to shrink. The law now allowed police to name people who used underage prostitutes, tripled jail sentences and fines for pimps and no longer treated underage prostitutes as criminals.

Following the passage of the Anti-Prostitution Laws, police began raiding brothels, targeting red-light districts like Miari as they were the most visible and easily identified form of prostitution. From 2004 to 2005, the number of brothels in South Korea dropped by 637 and the number of sex workers dropped from 3,142 to 2,653. In 2007, the Seoul Metropolitan Government began a new project to make Seoul safer for women under the Department of Women and Family Affairs. However, Miari and other Seoul prostitution hotspots were specifically excluded from these initiatives. As of January 2010, there were only 136 recorded prostitution establishments in Miari Texas with its physical borders shrinking in Seongbuk as well.

== Redevelopment ==
Starting in the mid-1990s, Seoul's government began rapidly redeveloping its districts, relocating many of its urban poor, which made up a large portion of Miari's population. In the late 1990s, renovation plans created a new internal road system in Miari, which purposefully isolated Miari Texas’ alleyways. In 2002, the Seoul Metropolitan Government passed the New Town Project aimed at redeveloping many of its districts with Miari included. Part of the ongoing efforts to change Seoul's appearance, the redevelopment of Miari has led to it becoming more residential and commercial. As of 2020, recent projects in Seongbuk aim for the creation of 2,244 apartments and 486 officetels and other facilities.
