= Gyeryongsan =

Mountain in South Chungcheong, South Korea

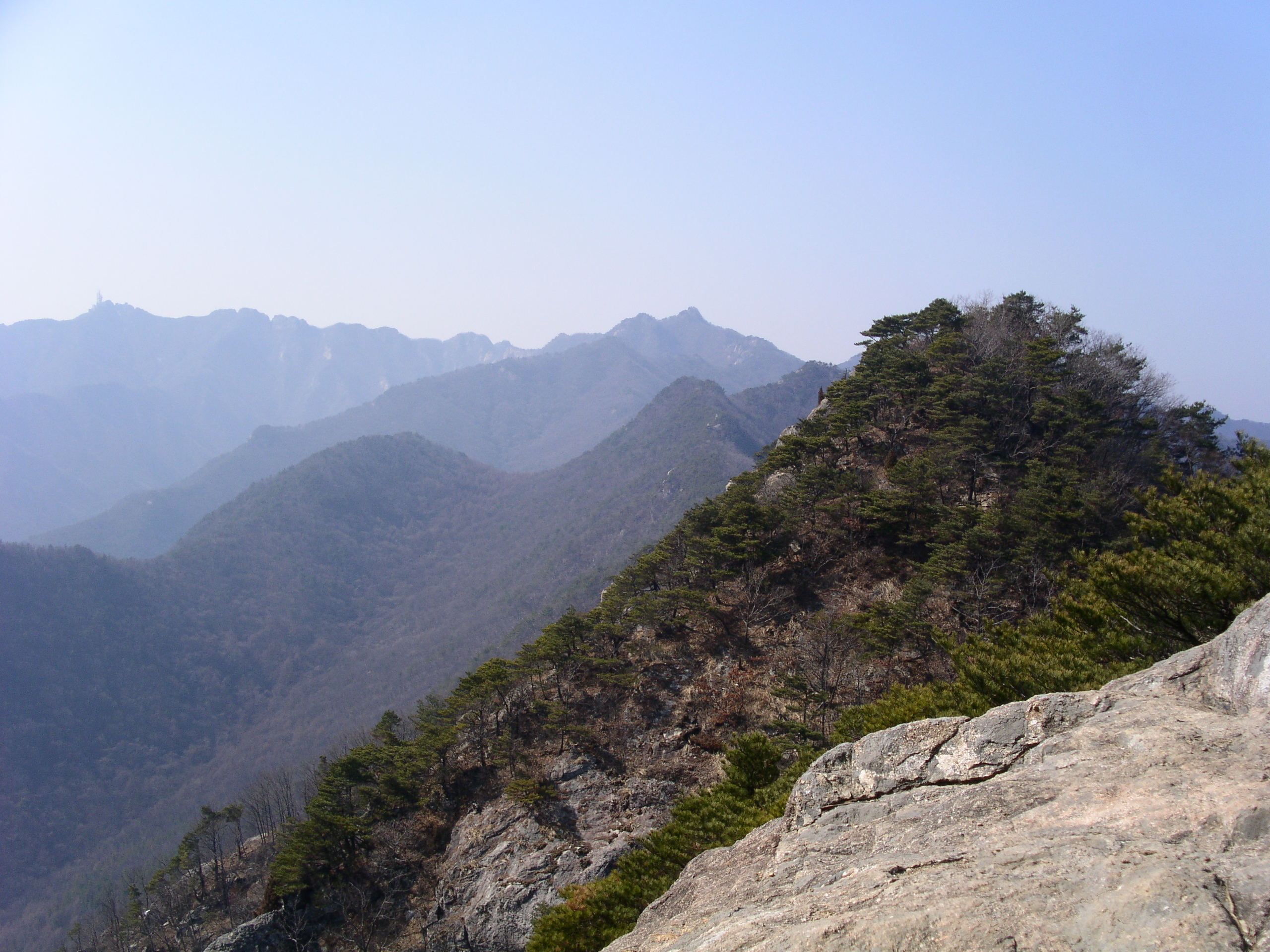

Highest point
- Elevation: 845 m (2,772 ft)
- Coordinates: 36°20′36″N 127°12′22″E

Geography
- Location: South Korea

Korean name
- Hangul: 계룡산
- Hanja: 鷄龍山
- RR: Gyeryongsan
- MR: Kyeryongsan

Gyeryongsan (Korean: 계룡산) is a 845 m (2,772 ft) mountain in South Chungcheong Province, South Korea. It lies at the meeting of the boundaries of several cities: Gongju, Gyeryong, Nonsan, and Daejeon. It has been traditionally regarded as a sacred mountain, with the most qi of any in South Korea. The name Gyeryongsan means chicken dragon mountain. Portions of the mountain are included in a South Korean military reserve. Other portions are part of Gyeryongsan National Park. In the mountain, there are famous Buddhist temples such as Donghaksa, Gapsa and Sinwonsa, the latter two both being over a thousand years old. In addition the highest peak, Cheonhwangbong, there are seven other peaks with an elevation exceeding 500m.

The park has an area of 64.6 km^{2}. Besides insects, birds and small fish, the park's fauna include snakes, hedgehogs, deer, and striped squirrels. Wild boar are also said to inhabit the park. About 1.4 million visitors come to the park each year. It is accessible by bus from the surrounding cities and villages and has a camp-ground. There are a total of 1,160 kinds of flora and fauna including 611 kinds of plants and 23 kinds of wild animals including roe deer and neoguri. There are a total of 42 cultural resources, including 2 national treasures and 10 treasures, including 18 designated cultural properties and 24 non-designated cultural properties.

== See also ==
- List of mountains in South Korea
- Geography of South Korea
- Environment of South Korea
- Korean shamanism
