= List of My Little Old Boy episodes =

My Little Old Boy (a.k.a. Mom's Diary: My Ugly Duckling) is a South Korean television entertainment program, distributed and syndicated by SBS every Sunday at 21:05 (KST).

As of May 11, 2025, 442 episodes of My Little Old Boy have been aired.

== Series overview ==
Year	Episodes	Originally released	
Year	Episodes	First released	Last released
Pilot	1	July 20, 2016	July 20, 2016
2016	18	August 26, 2016	December 30, 2016
2017	50	January 6, 2017	December 24, 2017
2018	53	January 7, 2018	December 30, 2018
2019	51	January 6, 2019	December 29, 2019
2020	52	January 2, 2020	December 26, 2020
2021	51	January 2, 2021	December 26, 2021
2022	49	January 2, 2022	December 25, 2022
2023	50	January 1, 2023	December 31, 2023
2024	49	January 7, 2024	December 22, 2024
2025	52	January 5, 2025	December 28, 2025
2026	TBA	January 4, 2026	TBA

== Episodes (2016) ==
List of episodes in 2016 (episode Pilot–18)

Broadcast episode	Broadcast date	Cast(s)	Guest(s)	Remark
Pilot	July 20	Kim Gun-mo, Kim Je-dong, Heo Ji-woong		New Sons Kim Gun-mo, Kim Je-dong, Heo Ji-woong appearance MC Shin Dong-yup, Seo Jang-hoon, Han Hye-jin appearance
1	August 26	Kim Gun-mo, Park Soo-hong, Heo Ji-woong	Kim Jong-min, Son Hun-soo	New Son Park Soo-hong appearance
2	September 2	Kim Gun-mo, Park Soo-hong, Heo Ji-woong	Kim Jong-min, Son Hun-soo, Ji Sang-ryeol, Kim Sung-soo, Yoon Jung-soo	
3	September 9	Kim Je-dong, Kim Gun-mo, Park Soo-hong, Heo Ji-woong	Son Hun-soo, Yoon Jung-soo	Kim Je-dong last episode New Son Tony Ahn appearance
4	September 23	Kim Gun-mo, Park Soo-hong, Tony Ahn	Kim Jae-duck	
5	September 30	Kim Gun-mo, Park Soo-hong, Tony Ahn, Heo Ji-woong	Kim Jong-min, Son Hun-soo, Ji Sang-ryeol, Yoon Jung-soo, Gugudan	
6	October 7	Kim Gun-mo, Park Soo-hong, Tony Ahn, Heo Ji-woong	Kim Jong-min, Son Hun-soo, Ji Sang-ryeol, Yoon Jung-soo, Kim Jae-duck, Hwangbo	
7	October 14	Kim Gun-mo, Park Soo-hong, Heo Ji-woong	Son Hun-soo, Byun Young-joo, Lee Hae-young	
8	October 21	Kim Gun-mo, Tony Ahn, Heo Ji-woong	Kim Jong-min, Kim Jae-duck	
9	October 28	Kim Gun-mo, Park Soo-hong, Tony Ahn	Ji Sang-ryeol, Kim Jae-duck	
10	November 4	Kim Gun-mo, Park Soo-hong, Heo Ji-woong	Ji Sang-ryeol	
11	November 11	Kim Gun-mo, Park Soo-hong, Tony Ahn, Heo Ji-woong	Son Hun-soo, Yoon Jung-soo, Kim Jae-duck	
12	November 18	Kim Gun-mo, Park Soo-hong, Tony Ahn	Son Hun-soo, Yoon Jung-soo	
13	November 25	Kim Gun-mo, Park Soo-hong, Heo Ji-woong	Kim In-suk	
14	December 2	Kim Gun-mo, Park Soo-hong, Tony Ahn		
15	December 9	Kim Gun-mo, Park Soo-hong, Heo Ji-woong	Lee Soo-geun, Kim Heung-gook	
16	December 16	Kim Gun-mo, Park Soo-hong, Heo Ji-woong, Tony Ahn		
17	December 23	Kim Gun-mo, Tony Ahn, Park Soo-hong, Heo Ji-woong	Kim Jong-min, Kim In-suk	
18	December 30		Kim Jae-duck	

== Episodes (2017) ==
List of episodes in 2017 (episode 19–68)

Broadcast episode	Broadcast date	Cast(s)	Guest(s)	Remark
19	January 6	Kim Gun-mo, Park Soo-hong, Heo Ji-woong		
20	January 13	Kim Gun-mo, Park Soo-hong, Tony Ahn	Son Hun-soo, Moon Hee-joon, Chun Myung-hoon, Danny Ahn	MC Han Hye-jin's last episode
21	January 20	Kim Gun-mo, Park Soo-hong, Heo Ji-woong	Yoon Jung-soo	Special host: Kim Min-jong
22	January 27	Kim Gun-mo, Park Soo-hong, Tony Ahn	Son Hun-soo, Yoon Jung-soo, Kim Jae-duck, Moon Hee-joon, Chun Myung-hoon, Danny Ahn	Special host: Kim Min-jong
23	February 3	Kim Gun-mo, Park Soo-hong, Heo Ji-woong	Yoon Jung-soo	Special host: Kim Jong-min
24	February 10	Kim Gun-mo, Park Soo-hong, Tony Ahn	Kim Jong-min, Kim Jae-duck	Special host: Kim Jong-min
25	February 17	Kim Gun-mo, Park Soo-hong, Heo Ji-woong	Jo Woo-jong, Kim Jong-min, Ji Sang-ryeol, Yoon Jung-soo, Kim Heung-gook, AOA	Special host: Cha Tae-hyun
26	February 24	Kim Gun-mo, Park Soo-hong, Tony Ahn	Kim Jae-duck, Kangta, Yang Se-hyung	Special host: Cha Tae-hyun
27	March 3	Kim Gun-mo, Park Soo-hong, Tony Ahn	Son Hun-soo, Cosmic Girls, Monsta X, You Hee-yeol, Yang Hyun-suk, Park Jin-young	Special host: Sung Si-kyung
28	March 17	Kim Gun-mo, Park Soo-hong, Tony Ahn, Heo Ji-woong	Son Hun-soo, Kim Jae-duck, You Hee-yeol, Yang Hyun-suk, Park Jin-young	Special host: Sung Si-kyung
29	March 24	Kim Gun-mo, Park Soo-hong, Heo Ji-woong		Special host: Tak Jae-hoon
30	March 31	Kim Gun-mo, Park Soo-hong, Heo Ji-woong	Kim Jae-duck	Special host: Tak Jae-hoon
31	April 7	Kim Gun-mo, Park Soo-hong, Heo Ji-woong	Kim Jong-min, Yoon Jung-soo	Special host: Kim Heung-gook; Heo Ji-woong last episode
32	April 16	Kim Gun-mo, Lee Sang-min, Park Soo-hong	Kim Jong-min, Yoon Jung-soo	Special host: Ahn Jae-wook; New Son Lee Sang-min appearance
33	April 23	Tony Ahn, Lee Sang-min, Kim Gun-mo	Kim Jong-min, Kim Jae-duck, Kim Heung-gook, Solbi, Han Yeong	Special host: Ahn Jae-wook
34	April 30	Kim Gun-mo, Lee Sang-min, Park Soo-hong	Kim Jong-min	Special host: You Hee-yeol
35	May 7	Tony Ahn, Lee Sang-min, Park Soo-hong	Yoon Jung-soo, Kim Tae-woo	Special host: You Hee-yeol
36	May 14	Park Soo-hong, Lee Sang-min, Kim Gun-mo	Choi Dae-sung, Kim Jong-min, Son Hun-soo, Lee Soo-geun, Hong Seok-cheon, Min Kyung-hoon, Sleepy, Choi Dae-chul, Kim Tae-hyeon	Special host: You Hee-yeol
37	May 21	Tony Ahn, Park Soo-hong, Lee Sang-min, Kim Gun-mo	Choi Dae-sung, Son Hun-soo, Kim Jae-duck, Lee Soo-geun, Hong Seok-cheon, Min Kyung-hoon, Sleepy, Choi Dae-chul, Kim Tae-hyeon	Special host: You Hee-yeol
38	May 28	Park Soo-hong, Lee Sang-min, Kim Gun-mo	Lee Soo-geun, Yoo Young-seok, Park Sang-myun, Hong Rok-gi, Don Spike, Hong Seok-cheon, Min Kyung-hoon, Sleepy	Special host: Joo Sang-wook
39	June 4	Tony Ahn, Kim Gun-mo, Lee Sang-min	Kim Jong-min, Kim Jae-duck, Lee So-yool, Hong Seok-cheon, Kangta	Special host: Joo Sang-wook
40	June 11	Park Soo-hong, Kim Gun-mo, Lee Sang-min	Don Spike	Special host: Park Myeong-su
41	June 18	Tony Ahn, Park Soo-hong, Lee Sang-min	Kim Jae-duck, Don Spike, Kangta	Special host: Park Myeong-su
42	June 25	Park Soo-hong, Kim Gun-mo, Lee Sang-min	Choi Dae-sung, Kim Gura	Special host: Oh Yeon-soo
43	July 2	Tony Ahn, Park Soo-hong, Lee Sang-min, Kim Gun-mo	Yang Se-chan, DinDin, Kim Jae-duck, Danny Ahn, Jang Su-won, Yoo Jae-hwan, Kim Hee-chul (Super Junior), Jung Joon-young, Sleepy	Special host: Oh Yeon-soo
44	July 9	Kim Gun-mo, Lee Sang-min, Park Soo-hong	Choi Dae-sung, Son Hun-soo, Yoon Jung-soo, Jung Joon-young, Don Spike	Special host: Yeon Jung-hoon
45	July 16	Tony Ahn, Lee Sang-min, Kim Gun-mo	Kim Jong-min, Jung Joon-young	Special host: Yeon Jung-hoon
46	July 23	Park Soo-hong, Kim Gun-mo, Lee Sang-min	Noh Sa-yeon, iKon, Park Soo-bin (Cosmic Girls), Kim Il-jung, Noh Sa-bong, Lee Seong-min, Ahn Moon-sook	Special host: Yoon Sang-hyun
47	July 30	Tony Ahn, Park Soo-hong, Lee Sang-min	Chae Ri-na, Kim Ji-hyun, Boom, Yoon Jung-soo, Hwangbo, Lee Ji-hye	Special host: Yoon Sang-hyun
48	August 6	Park Soo-hong, Kim Gun-mo, Lee Sang-min	Tak Jae-hoon, Kim Jong-kook, Kim Jong-min, Yoon Jung-soo, Kim Heung-gook, Kang Ho-dong, Jung Jae-yoon, Ryu Pil-jong, Lee So-yool, Hong Rok-gi	Special host: Kim Hee-sun
49	August 13	Tony Ahn, Park Soo-hong, Kim Gun-mo	Boom, Tak Jae-hoon, Kim Jong-min, Kim Jae-duck, Kim Heung-gook, Jung Jae-yoon, Ryu Pil-jong, Lee So-yool, Hong Rok-gi	Special host: Kim Hee-sun
50	August 20	Lee Sang-min, Kim Gun-mo, Park Soo-hong	Choi Dae-sung, Kim Jong-kook, Kim Young-chul, Son Hun-soo, Yoon Jung-soo, Lee Soo-geun, Kim Hee-chul (Super Junior), Min Kyung-hoon, Don Spike	Special hosts: Kim Hee-sun, Kim Jong-kook
51	August 27	Tony Ahn, Kim Gun-mo, Lee Sang-min	Boom, Kim Jong-kook, Kim Jae-duck, Kim Heung-gook	Special host: Kim Jong-kook
52	September 3	Park Soo-hong, Lee Sang-min, Kim Gun-mo	Nam Chang-hee, Kim Soo-yong, Kim Sook, Jung Joon-young	Special host: Chae Shi-ra
53	September 10	Tony Ahn, Park Soo-hong, Lee Sang-min	Yang Se-chan, Boom, Yoon Jung-soo, Sayuri Fujita, Leeteuk (Super Junior), Don Spike	Special host: Chae Shi-ra
54	September 17	Park Soo-hong, Kim Gun-mo, Lee Sang-min	Kim Jong-min, Yoon Jung-soo, Sayuri Fujita	Special host: Son Ji-chang
55	September 24	Tony Ahn, Park Soo-hong, Kim Gun-mo	Yang Se-chan, Boom, Yoon Jung-soo	Special host: Son Ji-chang
56	October 1	Kim Gun-mo, Lee Sang-min, Kim Jong-min		Special host: Ahn Jung-hwan
57	October 8	Tony Ahn, Kim Jong-min, Yoon Jung-soo	Boom, Bbaek Ga, Yang Se-chan	Special host: Ahn Jung-hwan
58	October 15	Park Soo-hong, Kim Gun-mo, Lee Sang-min	DinDin, Bbaek Ga, Kim Jong-min, Yoon Jung-soo, Dok2, Don Spike	Special host: Kim Hyun-joo
59	October 22	Tony Ahn, Park Soo-hong, Lee Sang-min	Sam Okyere	Special host: Kim Hyun-joo
60	October 29	Tony Ahn, Kim Gun-mo, Park Soo-hong	Sam Okyere	Special host: Son Tae-young
61	November 5	Park Soo-hong, Kim Gun-mo, Lee Sang-min	Bbaek Ga, Nam Chang-hee, Kim Jong-min, Sayuri Fujita	Special host: Son Tae-young
62	November 12	Park Soo-hong, Lee Sang-min, Kim Gun-mo	Bbaek Ga, Nam Chang-hee, Kim Jong-min	Special host: Kim Jung-eun
63	November 19	Tony Ahn, Kim Gun-mo, Lee Sang-min	Bbaek Ga, Kim Jong-min	Special host: Kim Jung-eun
64	November 26	Kim Gun-mo, Park Soo-hong, Lee Sang-min	Kim Heung-gook. Lee Moo-song, Tae Jin-ah	Special host: Shin Seung-hun
65	December 3	Park Soo-hong, Tony Ahn, Kim Gun-mo		Special host: Shin Seung-hun
66	December 10	Park Soo-hong, Kim Gun-mo, Lee Sang-min		Special host: Kim Soo-ro
67	December 17	Lee Sang-min, Tony Ahn, and Park Soo-hong		Special host: Kim Soo-ro
68	December 24	Kim Gun-mo, Park Soo-hong, Tony Ahn	Bbaek Ga, Joo Byung-Jin, Sam Okyere	Special host: Go Joon-hee

== Episodes (2018) ==
List of episodes in 2018 (episode 69–119)

Broadcast episode	Broadcast date	Cast(s)	Guest(s)	Remark
69	January 7	Lee Sang-min, Kim Gun-mo, Tony Ahn	Tak Jae-hoon, Sam Okyere, Jeong Jun-ha	Special host: Kim Soo-ro
70	January 14	Tony Ahn, Lee Sang-min, Park Soo-hong	Joo Byung-Jin, Tak Jae-hoon, Sam Okyere	Special host: Kim So-yeon
71	January 21	Tony An, Kim Gun-mo, Park Soo-hong	Noh Sa-yeon, Sam Okyere	Special host: Lee Soo-geun
72	January 28	Lee Sang-min, Park Soo-hong, Yang Se-hyung & Yang Se-chan		Special host: Lee Soo-geun
73	February 4	Kim Gun-mo, Sam Okyere, Park Soo-hong	Tae Jin-ah	Special host: Noh Sa-yeon
74	February 11	Lee Sang-min, Park Soo-hong, Yang Se-hyung & Yang Se-chan	Haha (along with his mother), Yang Se-hyung	Special host: Kim Yong-man
75	February 18			
76	February 25	Lee Sang-min, Kim Jong-kook	Tak Jae-hoon	Special host: Jang Hyuk; New son Kim Jong-kook appearance
77	March 4	Tony Ahn, Kim Gun-mo, Lee Sang-min & Kim Jong-kook	Sam Okyere (along with his mother), Tae Jin-ah	Special hosts: Jang Hyuk, Seungri; Tony Ahn's last episode
78	March 11	Park Soo-hong, Kim Jong-kook, Lee Sang-min	Yoon Jung-soo, Tak Jae-hoon, Kim Sook	Special host: Seungri
79	March 18	Kim Jong-kook, Kim Gun-mo, Dok2		Special hosts: Seungri, Song Ji-hyo
80	March 25	Lee Sang-min, Kim Jong-kook, Kim Gun-mo	Tak Jae-hoon, Shorry J	Special hosts: Song Ji-hyo, Lee Da-hae
81	April 1	Park Soo-hong, Kim Jong-kook, Lee Sang-min	Sayuri Fujita, Hong Jin-young	Special host: Lee Da-hae
82	April 8	Park Soo-hong, Kim Jong-kook, Lee Sang-min	Kim Jong-min, Sayuri Fujita	Special hosts: Lee Da-hae, Joo Byung-jin
83	April 15	Kim Jong-kook, Park Soo-hong, Kim Gun-mo	Kim Jong-min	Special host: Joo Byung-jin
84	April 22	Kim Gun-mo, Lee Sang-min, Kim Jong-kook	Kim Jong-min, Tak Jae-hoon	Special hosts: Joo Byung-jin, Hong Jin-young
85	April 29	Lee Sang-min & Park Soo-hong, Kim Gun-mo, Kim Jong-kook	Shorry J	Special host: Hong Jin-young
86	May 6	Kim Gun-mo, Kim Jong-kook, Park Soo-hong	Yoon Jung-soo	Special host: Im Won-hee
87	May 13	Lee Sang-min, Im Won-hee, Kim Jong-kook	Kim Jong-min, Tak Jae-hoon, Kim Soo-mi	Special host: Jung Ryeo-won
88	May 20	Kim Gun-mo, Im Won-hee, Lee Sang-min	Tak Jae-hoon, Kim Soo-mi	Special host: Jung Ryeo-won
89	May 27	Lee Sang-min, Kim Jong-kook, Seungri	Kim Jong-min, Sayuri Fujita	Special host: Tae Jin-ah
90	June 3	Lee Sang-min, Kim Gun-mo, Seungri & Park Soo-hong	Sayuri Fujita, Tae Jin-ah	Special hosts: Lee Soo-kyung, Kim Soo-mi
91	June 10	Im Won-hee, Kim Jong-kook, Kim Gun-mo	Haha, Yang Se-chan	Special host: Kim Soo-mi
92	June 17	Lee Sang-min, Kim Jong-kook, Seungri & Park Soo-hong	Sayuri Fujita, Haha, Yang Se-chan	Special host: Kim Soo-mi
93	June 24	Kim Gun-mo, Kim Jong-kook, Park Soo-hong	Ji Sang-ryeol, Yang Se-chan	Special host: Kim Hee-ae
94	July 1	Kim Gun-mo, Im Won-hee, Seungri & Lee Sang-min	Park Ji-young	Special host: Kim Hee-ae
95	July 8	Kim Jong-kook, Park Soo-hong, Seungri & Lee Sang-min	Yoon Jung-soo, Han Hyun-min	Special host: Park Joong-hoon
96	July 15	Kim Gun-mo, Kim Jong-kook, Im Won-hee	Kim Jong-min	Special host: Park Joong-hoon
97	July 22	Kim Jong-kook, Seungri, Lee Sang-min	Kim Jong-min, Tak Jae-hoon, Soya, Blackpink	Special host: Yoo Ho-jeong
98	July 29	Im Won-hee, Yang Se-hyung & Yang Se-chan, Kim Gun-mo	Kim Jong-min, Noh Sa-yeon	Special host: Yoo Ho-jeong
99	August 5	Park Soo-hong, Yang Se-hyeong & Yang Se-chan, Kim Jong-kook	Yoon Jung-soo	Special host: Shin Hye-sun
100	August 12	Lee Sang-min, Kim Gun-mo, Yang Se-hyung & Yang Se-chan	Chae Ri-na, Kim Ji-hyun, Narsha, Tae Jin-ah	Special host: Shin Hye-sun
101	August 19	Kim Jong-kook, Im Won-hee, Park Soo-hong	Yoon Jung-soo, Haha	Special host: Noh Sa-yeon
102	September 2	Jung Jae-hyung, Kim Gun-mo, Im Won-hee	Kim Min-kyo, Tae Jin-ah	Special host: Lee Seung-gi
103	September 9	Park Soo-hong, Kim Jong-kook, Jung Jae-hyung	Yoon Jung-soo, Hong Jin-young	Special host: Lee Seung-gi
104	September 16	Kim Jong-kook, Im Won-hee, Lee Sang-min	Kim Jong-kook, Sayuri Fujita, Kim Min-kyo, Hong Jin-young, Lee Guk-joo, Sleepy	Special host: Im Chang-jung
105	September 23	Kim Jong-kook, Kim Gun-mo, Im Won-hee	Kim Jong-min, Kim Jong-kook, Bbaek Ga, Kim Jung-nam	Special host: Im Chang-jung
106	September 30	Park Soo-hong, Kim Gun-mo, Joo Byung-jin	Son Hun-soo, Yoon Jung-soo, Boom, Kim Jong-kook	Special host: Lee Dong-gun
107	October 7	Kim Jong-kook, Im Won-hee, Joo Byung-jin	Kim Jong-min, Kim Jong-kook, Jung Suk-yong	Special host: Lee Dong-gun
108	October 14	Im Won-hee, Kim Jong-kook, Lee Sang-min		Special host: Bae Jung-nam
109	October 21	Lee Sang-min, Kim Gun-mo, Bae Jeong-nam		Special host: Jo Yoon-hee
110	October 28	Park Soo-hong, Kim Jong-kook, Bae Jeong-nam	Haha, Kim Young-hee, Yang Se-chan	Special host: Kim Jun-hyun
111	November 4	Kim Jong-kook, Kim Gun-mo, Im Won-hee	Haha, Tae Jin-ah, Yang Se-chan	Special host: Yoon Do-hyun
112	November 11	Kim Gun-mo, Kim Jong-kook, Bae Jeong-nam	Noh Sa-yeon, Kim Jung-nam, Kim Wan-sun, Cha Seung-won, Tae Jin-ah	Special host: Lee Moon-sae
113	November 18	Lee Sang-min, Im Won-hee, Hong Jin-young & Hong Sun-young	Jang Dong-min, Heo Kyung-hwan, Sleepy	Special host: Lee Moon-sae; New Daughters Hong Jin-young & Hong Sun-young appearance
114	November 25	Kim Gun-mo, Im Won-hee, Hong Jin-young & Hong Sun-young	Noh Sa-yeon, Jung Suk-yong, Tae Jin-ah	Special host: Lee Min-jung
115	December 2	Park Soo-hong, Kim Jong-kook & Lee Sang-min, Bae Jeong-nam	Son Hun-soo, Choi Dae-sung, Nam Chang-hee, Sayuri Fujita, Lee Sung-min, David Lee McInnis	Special host: Lee Min-jung
116	December 9	Kim Gun-mo, Kim Jong-kook & Lee Sang-min, Bae Jeong-nam	Sayuri Fujita	Special host: Lee Sun-hee
117	December 16	Im Won-hee, Lee Sang-min, Bae Jeong-nam	Sayuri Fujita, Kim Gura	Special host: Park Joo-mi
118	December 23	Kim Gun-mo, Kim Jong-kook, Hong Jin-young & Hong Sun-young	Kim Jung-nam, Kim Wan-sun, Im Jun-hyeok, Jang Hong-je, Lee Joon-hyung	Special host: Lee Beom-soo
119	December 30	Kim Jong-kook, Hong Jin-young & Hong Sun-young	Kim Jung-nam, Kim Wan-sun	Special host: Lee Beom-soo

== Episodes (2019) ==
List of episodes in 2019 (episode 120–170)

Broadcast episode	Broadcast date	Cast(s)	Guest(s)	Remark
120	January 6	Lee Sang-min, Kim Gun-mo, Bae Jeong-nam	Kim Jong-min, Jang Dong-min, Byun Yo-han	Special host: Shin Ae-ra
121	January 13	Im Won-hee, Bae Jeong-nam, Hong Jin-young & Hong Sun-young	Kim Min-kyo, Byun Yo-han	Special host: Shin Ae-ra
122	January 20	Park Soo-hong, Kim Jong-kook, Im Won-hee	Hong Seok-cheon	Special hosts: Shin Ae-ra, Jun Jin
123	January 27	Kim Gun-mo, Kim Jong-kook, Im Won-hee		Special host: Choi Soo-jong
124	February 3	Bae Jeong-nam, Im Won-hee, Lee Sang-min	Kim Bo-sung	Special host: Choi Soo-jong
125	February 10	Kim Gun-mo, Lee Sang-min, Kim Jong-kook, Hong Jin-young & Hong Sun-young	Kim Bo-sung, Kim Shin-young, Go Myung-hwan, Im Ji-eun, Yoo Se-yoon, Shin Ji	Special host: Lee Ha-nui
126	February 17	Park Soo-hong & Im Won-hee, Kim Jong-kook, Hong Jin-young & Hong Sun-young	Kim Shin-young, Yoo Se-yoon, Shin Ji, Muzie	Special host: Jung Il-woo
127	February 24	Bae Jeong-nam, Kim Jong-kook, Park Soo-hong & Im Won-hee	Kim Jong-min, Bbaek Ga, Kim Jung-nam, Shin Ji	Special host: Han Ye-seul
128	March 3	Im Won-hee, Hong Jin-young & Hong Sun-young	Jung Suk-yong, Kim Jong-kook	Special host: Han Ye-seul
129	March 10	Im Won-hee, Hong Jin-young & Hong Sun-young, Lee Sang-min	Jung Suk-yong, Tak Jae-hoon, Kim Soo-mi	Special host: Park Hee-soon
130	March 17	Kim Jong-kook, Hong Jin-young & Hong Sun-young, Lee Sang-min	Haha, Tak Jae-hoon, Kim Soo-mi	Special host: Park Hee-soon
131	March 24	Kim Gun-mo, Kim Jong-kook, Hong Jin-young & Hong Sun-young	Bbaek Ga (along with his mother), Haha, Kim Shin-young, Lee Moo-song, Tae Jin-ah	Special host: Yoona (Girls' Generation)
132	March 31	Park Soo-hong, Im Won-hee, Bae Jeong-nam	Yoon Jung-soo, Son Hun-soo, Jung Suk-yong, Lee Sang-yoon, Park Sung-woong, Uhm Jung-hwa	Special host: Yoona (Girls' Generation)
133	April 7	Lee Sang-min, Hong Jin-young & Hong Sun-young, Bae Jeong-nam	Kim Bo-sung, Kim Shin-young	Special host: Lee Tae-ran
134	April 14	Lee Sang-min, Kim Gun-mo, Bae Jeong-nam	Kim Bo-sung	Special host: Lee Tae-ran
135	April 21	Im Won-hee & Park Soo-hong, Kim Jong-kook, Bae Jeong-nam	Yoo Jae-suk, Lee Kwang-soo, Jeon So-min	Special host: Kim Young-kwang (actor)
136	April 28	Hong Jin-young & Hong Sun-young, Lee Sang-min, Bae Jeong-nam	Tak Jae-hoon	Special host: Kim Ji-seok
137	May 5	Hong Jin-young & Hong Sun-young, Lee Sang-min, Jun Jin	Tak Jae-hoon	Special host: June Kang
138	May 12	Kim Jong-kook & Hong Sun-young, Im Won-hee & Lee Sang-min, Jun Jin	Kim Kang-hyun, Shinhwa	Special host: Park Hyung-sik
139	May 19	Kim Gun-mo, Im Won-hee, Lee Sang-min	Kim Jong-min, Tak Jae-hoon, Bbaek Ga, Kim Soo-mi	Special host: Kim Won-hee; Kim Gun-mo's last episode
140	May 26	Park Soo-hong, Kim Jong-kook, Lee Sang-min	Son Hun-soo, Tak Jae-hoon, Kim Soo-mi	Special host: Kim Won-hee
141	June 2	Hong Jin-young & Hong Sun-young, Bae Jeong-nam, Lee Sang-min	Tak Jae-hoon, Kim Soo-mi	Special host: Go Jun
142	June 9	Lee Sang-min, Hong Jin-young & Hong Sun-young, Kim Jong-kook	Kim Bo-sung	Special host: Go Jun
143	June 16	Bae Jeong-nam, Lee Sang-min, Hong Jin-young & Hong Sun-young	Kim Bo-sung	Special host: Son Dam-bi
144	June 23	Park Soo-hong, Lee Sang-min, Kim Jong-kook	Kim Jong-min, Haha, Kim Bo-sung, Byul, Lee Dong-woo, Kim Kyung-sik	Special host: Baek Ji-young
145	June 30	Im Won-hee, Kim Jong-kook, Bae Jeong-nam	Lee Sung-min, Paul Pogba (along with his mother), Kim Jae-young, Son Yeo-eun, Kim Hye-eun, Lim Hyun-seong, Kim Sung-kyun, Kim Jong-soo	Special host: Kim Bum-soo
146	July 7	Bae Jeong-nam, Lee Sang-min, Hong Jin-young & Hong Sun-young	Lee Sung-min, Kim Bo-sung, Kim Jae-young, Son Yeo-eun, Kim Hye-eun, Kim Sung-kyun, Kim Jong-soo, Jo Woo-jin	Special host: Kim Hee-chul (Super Junior)
147	July 14	Im Won-hee, Kim Jong-kook, Hong Jin-young & Hong Sun-young	Haha, Jung Suk-yong	Special host: Ye Ji-won
148	July 21	Park Soo-Hong, Im Won-hee, Hong Jin-young & Hong Sun-young	Son Hun-soo, Jung Suk-yong	Special host: Ji Suk-jin
149	July 28	Park Soo-hong, Lee Sang-min, Kim Jong-kook	Son Hun-soo, Kim Bo-sung, Lee Dong-woo, Kim Kyung-sik, Park Kyung-lim, Hong Seok-cheon	Special host: Ha Hee-ra
150	August 4	Im Won-hee, Lee Sang-min, Bae Jeong-nam	David Lee McInnis, Lee Cheol-min, Lee Kye-in, Han Song-yi, Lee Soon-sil	Special host: Ha Hee-ra
151	August 11	Bae Jeong-nam, Kim Jong-kook, Hong Jin-young	Heo Kyung-hwan, David Lee McInnis, Park Sung-kwang, Kim Ji-ho	Special host: Han Chae-young
152	August 18	Im Won-hee, Kim Jong-kook, Hong Jin-young & Hong Sun-young		Special host: Ku Hye-sun
153	August 25	Kim Jong-kook, Im Won-hee & Lee Sang-min, Kim Hee-chul	Kim Bo-sung	Special host: Hur Jae; New son Kim Hee-chul appearance
154	September 1	Park Soo-hong, Hong Jin-young & Hong Sun-young, Kim Hee-chul	Yoon Jung-soo, Nam Chang-hee, Lee Jin-ho	Special host: Cha Ye-ryun
155	September 8	Im Won-hee, Park Soo-hong, Hong Jin-young & Hong Sun-young	Lee Dong-woo, Kim Kyung-sik, Kim Eung-soo	Special host: Han Go-eun
156	September 15	Bae Jeong-nam, Kim Jong-kook & Lee Sang-min, Kim Hee-chul		Special host: Lee Sang-yoon
157	September 22	Park Soo-Hong, Im Won-hee, Kim Hee-chul	Jeong Jun-ha, Lee Dong-woo, Kim Kyung-sik	Special host: Pak Se-ri
158	September 29	Park Soo-hong, Lee Sang-min, Kim Jong-kook	Tak Jae-hoon, Kim Jung-nam, Yoo Se-yoon, Lee Dong-woo, Kim Kyung-sik, Muzie, Song Jin-woo	Special host: Lee Sang-yeob
159	October 6	Park Soo-hong, Hong Jin-young & Hong Sun-young, Kim Hee-chul	DinDin, Heo Kyung-hwan, Lee Dong-woo, Kim Kyung-sik, Kim Won-hyo	Special host: Lee Seung-chul
160	October 13	Lee Sang-min, Kim Jong-kook, Kim Hee-chul	Kim Bo-sung, Yoo Se-yoon, Super Junior	Special host: Lee Jung-hyun
161	October 20	Bae Jeong-nam, Lee Sang-min, Kim Hee-chul & Im Won-hee	Chae Ri-na, Kim Ji-hyun, Jeong Jun-ha, Park Jin-joo, Bobby Kim	Special host: Lee Yeon-bok
162	October 27	Hong Jin-young, Kim Jong-kook, Kim Hee-chul & Im Won-hee	Jeong Jun-ha, Kim Shin-young, Yoo Se-yoon, P.O (Block B), Twice	Special host: Choi Jin-hyuk
163	November 3	Im Won-hee, Park Soo-hong, Kim Hee-chul	Yoon Jung-soo, Jung Suk-yong	
164	November 10	Lee Sang-min, Kim Jong-kook, Hong Jin-young & Hong Sun-young	Chae Ri-na, Kim Ji-hyun, Tak Jae-hoon, Yoo Se-yoon, Muzie, Song Jin-woo	Special host: Chun Jung-myung
165	November 24	Kim Jong-kook, Lee Sang-min, Kim Hee-chul	DinDin, Yang Se-chan, Sleepy	Special host: Choi Si-won (Super Junior)
166	December 1	Im Won-hee, Bae Jeong-nam, Hong Jin-young & Hong Sun-young	Lee Sung-min, Jung Suk-yong, Han Chae-young	Special host: Jang Yoon-jeong
167	December 8	Kim Gun-mo, Im Won-hee	Noh Sa-yeon, Bbaek Ga, Lee Moo-song, Tae Jin-ah, Heo Sol-ji (EXID)	Special host: Kang Daniel; Removed the VOD part of Kim Gun-mo who was charged with sexual assault
168	December 15	Kim Jong-kook, Lee Sang-min, Kim Hee-chul	Lee Soo-geun, Jo Woo-jong, DinDin, Tak Jae-hoon, Kim Young-chul, Shindong (Super Junior), ITZY	Special hosts: Kang Daniel, Park Tae-hwan
169	December 22	Lee Sang-min, Kim Jong-kook, Kim Hee-chul	Tak Jae-hoon, Yoo Se-yoon, Shindong (Super Junior), ITZY	Special host: Cho Kyu-hyun (Super Junior)
170	December 29	Lee Sang-min, Hong Jin-young, Kim Hee-chul	Tak Jae-hoon, Heo Kyung-hwan, Kim Young-chul, Shindong (Super Junior)	Special hosts: Jung Yong-hwa (CNBlue), Yoo Jun-sang

== Episodes (2020) ==
List of episodes in 2020 (episode 171–222)

Broadcast episode	Broadcast date	Cast(s)	Guest(s)	Remark
171	January 5	Kim Hee-chul, Park Soo-hong, Kim Jong-kook	Yoon Jung-soo, Son Hun-soo, DinDin, Shindong (Super Junior), Yang Se-chan	Special host: Yoo Jun-sang
172	January 12	Lee Sang-min, Hong Jin-young, Im Won-hee	Tak Jae-hoon, Heo Kyung-hwan, Jung Suk-yong, Park Sung-kwang, Kim Ji-ho, Kim Won-hyo, Park Young-jin, DJ DOC	Special hosts: Yoo Jun-sang, Kim Min-jun
173	January 19	Kim Hee-chul & Lee Sang-min, Bae Jeong-nam, Eum Moon-suk	Kim Young-chul, Byun Yo-han, Hwang Chi-yeul	Special hosts: Kim Min-jun, Lee Sung-min
174	January 26	Kim Hee-chul, Lee Sang-min, Eum Moon-suk	Tak Jae-hoon, Kim Young-chul, Kim Sung-kyun, Hwang Chi-yeul, Kim Nam-gil, Lee Hanee	Special host: Lee Sung-min
175	February 2	Im Won-hee, Park Soo-hong, Kim Hee-chul	Lee Soo-geun, Jung Suk-yong, Shindong (Super Junior), Jung Ju-ri	Special host: Song Chang-eui
176	February 9	Kim Hee-chul, Park Soo-hong, Kim Jong-kook	Yoon Jung-soo, Haha, Lee Dong-woo, Kim Kyung-sik, Yang Se-chan	Special host: Song Ga-in
177	February 16	Im Won-hee & Lee Sang-min, Hong Jin-young & Hong Sun-young, Kim Jong-kook	Tak Jae-hoon	Special host: Song Ga-in
178	February 23	Kim Hee-chul, Kim Jong-kook, Oh Min-suk	Ji Sang-ryeol, Jo Dal-hwan	Special host: Bong Tae-gyu
179	March 1	Kim Hee-chul, Lee Sang-min, Oh Min-suk	Ji Sang-ryeol, Kim Bo-sung, Jo Dal-hwan, Chan Sung Jung	Special host: Jin Sung
180	March 8	Im Won-hee, Park Soo-hong, Kim Hyung-muk	Yoon Jung-soo, Nam Chang-hee, Kim Hong-fa, Han Suk-kyu, Shin Dong-wook, Byun Woo-min, Jin Kyung, Ahn Hyo-seop, Jung Gi-sub, Jung Hee-tae, Jang Myung-gap, Heo Jae-ho	Special host: Yook Sung-jae (BtoB)
181	March 15	Kim Hee-chul, Lee Sang-min, Hong Jin-young	Jeong Jun-ha, Soyou, Daniel Hicks, Jonathan Thona, Kim Yonja	Special host: Eun Ji-won
182	March 22	Kim Jong-kook, Im Won-hee, Kim Hee-chul	Shindong (Super Junior), Apink (Park Cho-rong, Yoon Bo-mi, Son Na-eun, Kim Nam-joo, Oh Ha-young), Lee Kyu-ho, Lee Ho-cheol, Yang Se-chan	Special host: Lee Tae-sung
183	March 29	Lee Sang-min & Kim Hee-chul, Park Soo-hong, Hong Jin-young & Hong Sun-young	Han Sang-jin, Joo Sang-wook, Yoon Hee-seok, Hong Seok-cheon, Sleepy	Special host: Yoon Shi-yoon
184	April 5	Ugly Duckling Sons, (Note: (Tak Jae-hoon, Im Won-hee, Lee Sang-min, Park Soo-hong, Kim Jong-kook, Kim Hee-chul)) Kim Hee-chul, Lee Tae-sung	Ji Sang-ryeol, Kim Kyung-jin	Special host: Kim Sung-ryung; New sons Lee Tae-sung, Sung Yu-bin and grandson Lee Han-seung appeared
185	April 12	Kim Jong-kook, Hong Jin-young & Hong Sun-young, Oh Min-suk	Jo Dal-hwan, Kim Jun-hyun	Special host: Kim Sung-ryung
186	April 19	Kim Hee-chul, Lee Tae-sung, Ugly Duckling Sons	Ji Sang-ryeol, Shindong (Super Junior)	Special host: Choi Kang-hee
187	April 26	Kim Jong-kook, Oh Min-suk, Hong Jin-young & Hong Sun-young	Kim Jun-hyun, Yoon Park	Special host: Choi Kang-hee
188	May 3	Kim Jong-kook, Lee Sang-min, Kim Hee-chul & Im Won-hee	Yoo Se-yoon, Kim Kang-hoon, Reddy, Stephanie Lee, Han Hye-yeon, Yang Se-chan	Special host: Kim Yonja
189	May 10	Oh Min-suk, Im Won-hee, Lee Tae-sung	Lee Sang-yoon, Jo Dal-hwan, Lee Kyu-ho, Lee Ho-cheol, Min Sung-wook, Shin Jae-ha	Special host: So Yi-hyun
190	May 17	Bae Jeong-nam, Hong Jin-young & Hong Sun-young, Jang Minho & Young Tak	Kim Jong-soo, Kim Min-kyung	Special host: Yoo In-young
191	May 24	Oh Min-suk, Lee Tae-sung, Jang Minho & Yeong Tak	Yoon Park	Special host: Lee Jong-hyuk
192	May 31	Kim Hee-chul, Hong Jin-young & Hong Sun-young, Jang Minho & Yeong Tak	Ji Sang-ryeol, Noh Sa-yeon, Shindong (Super Junior)	Special host: Park Sun-young
193	June 7	Im Won-hee & Hong Jin-young & Hong Sun-young, Kim Jong-kook, Jang Minho & Yeong Tak	Haha, Kim Soo-mi, Yang Se-chan	Special host: Kim Ho-joong
194	June 14	Lee Tae-sung, Ugly Duckling Sons, Kim Ho-joong		Special host: Lee Moo-Saeng
195	June 21	Oh Min-suk & Lee Sang-min, Ugly Duckling Sons, Kim hojung		Special host: Jang Do-yeon
196	June 28	Lee Tae-sung, Lee Sang-min, Ugly Duckling Sons	Kim Bo-sung, Nam Gyu-ri, Lee Hoon	Special host: Lee Jung-jin
197	July 5	Kim Hee-chul, Lee Sang-min, Hong Jin-young & Hong Sun-young	Jeong Jun-ha, Kim Bo-sung, Lee Hoon, Lee Yeon-bok	Special host: Yunho (TVXQ)
198	July 12	Kim Hee-chul, Kim Jong-kook, Im Won-hee & Lee Sang-min	Tak Jae-hoon, Jung Suk-yong, Lee Ho-cheol, Ji Suk-jin, Hwang Je-sung, Yang Se-chan	Special host: Yoon Doo-joon (Highlight)
199	July 19	Oh Min-suk & Lee Sang-min, Lee Tae-sung, Kim Jong-kook	Tak Jae-hoon, Jung Suk-yong, Ji Suk-jin, Hwang Je-sung, Yang Se-chan	Special host: Haha
200	July 26	Lee Tae-sung, Im Won-hee & Lee Sang-min, Kim hojung	Tak Jae-hoon, Jung Suk-yong, Jin Sung	Special host: Oh Ji-ho
201	August 2	Oh Min-suk & Lee Sang-min, Kim Hee-chul, Ugly Duckling Babies (Note: (Tak Jae-hoon, Im Won-hee, Lee Sang-min, Kim Jong-kook, Kim Hee-chul, Hong Jin-young))	Ji Sang-ryeol, Shindong (Super Junior), Brian Joo (Fly to the Sky)	Special host: Hwang Kwanghee
202	August 9	Oh Min-suk & Lee Sang-min, Kim Hee-chul, Kim hojung	Ji Sang-ryeol, Lee Guk-joo	Special host: Park Sung-woong
203	August 16	Kim Jong-kook, Lee Sang-min, Ugly Duckling Babies	Kim Bo-sung, Lee Hoon, Hong Kyung-min, Cha Tae-hyun	Special host: Park Sung-woong
204	August 23	Kim Hee-chul, Hong Jin-young & Hong Sun-young, Im Won-hee & Lee Sang-min	Tak Jae-hoon, Lee Ho-cheol, Kangnam, Sandara Park	Special host: Kwak Do-won
205	August 30	Lee Tae-sung, Hong Jin-young & Hong Sun-young, Lee Sang-min	Tak Jae-hoon, Kangnam, Lee Sang-hwa	Special host: Kwak Do-won
206	September 6	Kim Jong-kook, Kim Hee-chul, Lee Sang-min	Tak Jae-hoon, Nam Chang-hee, Kangnam, Lee Sang-hwa, Joon Park, Lee Sedol, Kim Jang-hoon	Special host: Park Eun-bin
207	September 13	Kim Jong-kook, Hong Jin-young & Hong Sun-young, Im Won-hee & Bae Jeong-nam	Noh Sa-yeon, Haha, Nam Chang-hee, Shorry J, Zizo	Special host: Joo Hyun-mi
208	September 20	Oh Min-Suk, Im Won-hee & Bae Jeong-nam, Lee Sang-min	Tak Jae-hoon, Lee Guk-joo, Brian Joo (Fly to the Sky)	Special host: Kwak Si-yang
209	September 27	Kim Jong-kook, Kim Hee-chul & Lee Sang-min, Im Won-hee & Bae Jeong-nam	Tak Jae-hoon, Haha, Ji Suk-jin, Yang Se-chan	Special host: Jessi
210	October 4	Kim Jong-kook, Im Won-hee & Bae Jeong-nam, Im Won-hee & Lee Sang-min	Haha, Ji Suk-jin, Kim Hee-sun, Yang Se-chan	Special host: Oh Yoon-ah
211	October 11	Lee Tae-sung, Hong Jin-Young, Im Won-hee & Lee Sang-min	Tak Jae-hoon, Kim Hee-sun, Kim Jun-ho	Special host: Um Ki-joon
212	October 18	Park Soo-hong & Oh Min-suk, Im Won-hee & Lee Sang-min, Im Won-hee & Bae Jeong-nam	Tak Jae-hoon, Kim Hee-sun	Special host: Eugene
213	October 25	Kim Jun-ho, Hong Jin-young, Lee Sang-min & Kim Jong-kook	Tak Jae-hoon, Jin Sung, Jessi	Special host: Lee Sang-hwa
214	November 1	Im Won-hee, Kim Hee-chul & Lee Sangmin, Kim hojung	Tak Jae-hoon, Jo Woo-jin, Lee Je-hoon, Hyun Joo-yup	Special host: Park Ha-sun
215	November 8	Lee Tae-sung, Hong Jin-young & Hong Sun-young, Im Won-hee	Jung Suk-yong, Kim Seung-woo	Special host: Lee Juck; Hong Jin-young last episode
216	November 15	Lee Tae-sung, Kim Hee-chul, Ugly Duckling Sons (Note: (Tak Jae-hoon, Lee Sang-min, Park Soo-hong, Kim Jong-kook, Oh Min-suk, Kim Hee-chul))	Im Chae-moo, Sandara Park, Lee Ho-cheol	Special host: Kim Seung-woo
217	November 15	Im Won-hee & Hong Sun-young, Ugly Duckling Sons	Jung Suk-yong	Special host: BoA; Hong Sun-young last episode
218	November 29	Kim hee-chul, Im Won-hee, Kim Min-jong	Lee Ho-cheol, Jung Suk-yong, Kim Bo-sung	Special host: Jung Woo
219	December 6	Im Won-hee, Kim Min-jong & Lee Sang-min & Kim Jong-kook, Oh Min-suk	Tak Jae-hoon, Kim Bo-sung, Jung Suk-yong, Kim Jun-ho	Special host: Kim Jung-eun
220	December 13	Kim hee-chul, Lee Sang-min, Bae Jeong-nam	Kim Kyung-jin, Ji Sang-ryeol, Tak Jae-hoon, Ahn Jung-hwan, Hyun Joo-yup	Special host: Kim Kang-woo
221	December 20	Lee Tae-sung, Bae Jeong-nam, Ugly Duckling Sons (Note: (Kim Jun-ho, Lee Sang-min, Park Soo-hong, Kim Jong-kook, Oh Min-suk, Kim Hee-chul))	Park Chan-ho, Ahn Jung-hwan, Hyun Joo-yup	Special host: Choo Ja-hyun
222	December 27	Oh Min-suk & Park Soo-hong, Ugly Duckling Sons, Lee Sang-min & Kim Jong-kook	Tak Jae-hoon, Nam Chang-hee, Kim Soo-mi, Hyun Joo-yup	Special host: Rain

== Episodes (2021) ==
List of episodes in 2021 (episode 223–273)

Broadcast episode	Broadcast date	Cast(s)	Guest(s)	Remark
223	January 3	Im Won-hee & Kim Hee-chul, Kim Jong-kook, Kim Jun-ho & Lee Sang-min & Im Won-hee & Tak Jae-hoon	Jeong Jun-ha, Kim Mi-jin (Kim Jun-ho's sister)	Special host: Rain
224	January 10	Lee Tae-sung, Im Won-hee, Ugly Duckling Sons (Note: (Tak Jae-hoon, Im Won-hee, Jung Suk-yong, Lee Sang-min, Kim Jong-kook, Oh Min-suk, Kim Hee-chul))		Special host: Yoon Kyun-sang
225	January 17	Lee Sang-min & Tak Jae-hoon, Kim Hee-chul, Kim Jun-ho	Lee Soon-jae, Jeong Jun-ha, Ji Sang-ryeol, Jang Gwang, Jeon Seong-ae, Jang Yoon-hee, Hong In-gyu, Park Young-jin, Kim Dae-hee, Kim Sa-yoon, Kim Hyun-oh, Kim Ga-jeong	Special host: Minho (Shinee)
226	January 24	Kim Jong-kook, Kim Jun-ho & Lee Sang-min & Im Won-hee & Tak Jae-hoon, Park Goon, Lee Sang-min & Oh Min-suk	Nam Chang-hee, Heo Kyung-hwan, Jee Seok-jin, Haha	Special host: Cha In-pyo
227	January 31	Kim Hee-chul, Lee Sang-min & Park Soo-hong & Kim Jong-kook, Park Goon, Lee Sang-min & Oh Min-suk	Shindong, Eunhyuk, Cho Kyu-hyun, Eom Yong-su	Special host: Lee Da-hee
228	February 7	Kim Jong-kook & Kim Jun-ho, Lee Sang-min & Tak Jae-hoon, Ugly Duckling Sons (Note: (Tak Jae-hoon, Kim Jun-ho, Lee Sang-min, Kim Jong-kook, Bae Jeong-nam, Kim Hee-chul))	Hong In-gyu, Park Young-jin	Special host: Yoon Jong-hoon
229	February 14	Im Won-hee, Ugly Duckling Sons	Jung Suk-yong, Choi Kwang-je, Lee Jung-hyun, Lee Ho-cheol	Special host: Namkoong Min
230	February 21	Ugly Duckling Sons, Lee Sang-min & Oh Min-suk, Park Goon		Special host: Park Eun-seok
231	February 28	Park Soo-hong & Im Won-hee & Bae Jeong-nam, Oh Min-suk & Kim Jong-kook, Lee Sang-min & Tak Jae-hoon	Psy, Jessi	Special host: Kim Hyuna & Dawn
232	March 7	Kim Hee-chul & Im Won-hee, Park Goon & Lee Sang-min	Shindong, Eunhyuk, Lee Da-ji, Na Sang-do, Son Bin-ah, Choi Woo-jin	Special host: Kim Yoo-mi
233	March 14	Oh Min-suk & Lee Sang-min, Kim Jun-ho, Lee Sang-min & Tak Jae-hoon	KCM, Jeongwoo (Treasure), Kim Jong-min, Psy, Jessi	Special host: Rosé (Blackpink)
234	March 21	Im Won-hee, Kim Jun-ho & Lee Sang-min & Oh Min-suk, Choi Jin-hyuk	Lee Joong-ok, Tae Hang-ho	Special host: Jessi
235	March 28	Kim Jun-ho, Lee Hee Moon, Im Won-hee & Kim Jong-kook & Tak Jae-hoon		Special host: Shin Sung-rok
236	April 4	Kim Jong-kook & Kim Jun-ho, Kim Hee-chul, Tak Jae-hoon & Lee Sang-min & Kim Jun-ho	Kwon Jae-kwan, Kim Dae-hee, Ji Sang-ryeol, Jung Young-joo, Hwang Seok-jeong, Kim Gu-ra	Special host: Jin Ki-joo
237	April 11	Kim Jun-ho & Oh Min-suk, Lee Sang-min & Tak Jae-hoon, Park Goon	Eugene (S.E.S), Kim Gu-ra, Um Ki-joon	Special host: Lee Je-hoon
238	April 18	Im Won-hee & Lee Sang-min & Kim Jun-ho, Kim Jong-kook, Park Goon	Cha Tae-hyun	Special host: Kim Ok-vin
239	April 25	Kim Hee-chul & Im Won-hee, Lee Sang-min & Kim Jun-ho & Park Goon	Ji Sang-ryeol, Hwang Seok-jeong	Special host: Kim Ok-vin
240	May 2	Kim Jun-ho & Lee Sang-min, Ko Eun-ah, Lee Sang-min & Kim Hee-chul & Park Goon	KCM, Rain, Ciipher, Bang Hyo-seon, Jin Su-hyeon, Park Sang-hwa, Kim Yoo-jin, Park Eun-ha, Ahn Ji-hye	Special hosts: Winner (Kang Seung-yoon, Song Mino)
241	May 9	Ko Eun-ah, Kim Jong-kook, Park Goon	Na Sang-do, Son Bin-ah, Choi Woo-jin, Kim Se-jeong, Ciipher	Special host: Sung Si-kyung
242	May 16	Kim Hee-chul, Park Goon & Lee Sang-min	Jang Gwang, Ji Sang-ryeol, Park Jun-gyu	Special host: Oh Yeon-seo
243	May 23	Ko Eun-ah, Park Goon & Lee Sang-min, Choi Jin-hyuk	Cho Ha-jin, Yoo Young-jae	Special host: Seo In-guk
244	May 30	Kim Jun-ho & Lee Sang-min & Oh Min-suk, Ugly Duckling Sons (Note: (Tak Jae-hun, Im Won-hee, Lee Sang-min, Kim Jun-ho, Kim Jong-kook, Oh Min-suk, Kim Hee-chul, Choi Jin-hyuk, Park Goon))	Kwon Jae-kwan, Kim Kyoung-ah	Special host: Do Kyung-wan
245	June 6	Choi Jin-hyuk, Kim Jun-ho & Lee Sang-min & Im Won-hee & Tak Jae-hoon, Ugly Duckling Sons	Yoo Young-jae, Do Kyung-wan	Special host: Kim Tae-gyun
246	June 13	Lee Tae-sung, Ugly Duckling Sons		Special host: Jo Woo-jin
247	June 20	Kim Jun-ho, Im Won-hee & Choi Jin-hyuk, Lee Sang-min & Kim Jong-kook & Kim Hee-chul & Park Goon	Kim Dae-hee, Hong In-kyu, Park Young Jin	Special host: Jung So-min
248	June 27	Lee Sang-min & Kim Jong-kook & Kim Hee-chul & Park Goon, Kim Jun-ho, Im Won-hee & Choi Jin-hyuk	Na Sang-do	Special host: Moon Chae-won
249	July 4	Lee Tae-sung, Lee Sang-min & Kim Jun-ho, Park Goon	Lee Man-ki	Special host: Moon Chae-won
250	July 11	Park Goon, Ugly Duckling Sons		Special host: Lee Seung-yuop
251	July 18	Ugly Duckling Sons		Special host: John Park
252	August 1	Kim Jong-kook & Im Won-hee & Lee Sang-min, Park Goon	Kim Yonja, Hwang Seok-jeong, Jang Yoon-jeong	Special host: Jung Yong-hwa (CNBlue)
253	August 8	Choi Jin-hyuk, Kim Hee-chul	Oh Ah-rin, Kim Jung-min	Special host: Jung Yong-hwa (CNBlue), Lee Kwang-soo
254	August 15	Kim Jun-ho, Kim Hee-chul, Im Won-hee & Choi Jin-hyuk & Jung Suk-yong	Kwon Jae-kwan, Hong In-gyu, Kim Dae-hee, Shindong, Eunhyuk, Donghae	Special host: Lee Kwang-soo
255	August 22	Park Goon, Im Won-hee & Choi Jin-hyuk & Jung Suk-yong	Choi Young-jae, Hwang Chung-won, Lee Jinbong	Special host: On Joo-wan
256	August 29	Kim Jong-kook & Oh Min-suk, Park Goon & Lee Sang-min & Tak Jae-hoon, Kim Jun-ho & Lee Sang-min & Park Goon	Ateez,Do Kyung-wan	Special host: Yuri
257	September 5	Lee Sang-min & Park Goon & Kim Jun-ho, Oh Min-suk	Kim Yon-ja, Lee Yu-ra, Do Kyung-wan	Special host: Ahn Hyo-seop
258	September 12	Park Goon, Choi Jin-hyuk & Lee Sang-min, Kim Hee-chul & Kim Jun-ho	Seo Nam-yong	Special host: Park Joo-mi
259	September 19	Park Goon, Choi Jin-hyuk & Lee Sang-min, Kim Hee-chul & Kim Jun-ho	Seo Nam-yong	Special host: Han Ye-ri
260	September 26	Im Won-hee, Kim Jong-kook & Kim Hee-chul, Kim Jun-ho	Kim Jung-hwan, Gu Bon-gil, Seo Nam-yong	Special host: CL
261	October 3	Im Won-hee, Kim Jun-ho & Tak Jae-hoon, Kim Jong-kook & Lee Sang-min	Lee Soo-min, Seo Nam-yong	Special hosts: Vernon & Seungkwan (Seventeen)
262	October 10	Kim Jun-ho, Im Won-hee & Jung Suk-yong & Choi Jin-hyuk, Park Goon & Tak Jae-hoon & Lee Sang-min	Seo Nam-yong	Special host: Sunmi
263	October 17	Kim Jun-ho & Kim Jong-kook, Kim Jun-ho & Tak Jae-hoon, Ugly Duckling Sons (Note: (Tak Jae-hoon, Im Won-hee, Lee Sang-min, Kim Jun-ho, Kim Jong-kook, Oh Min-suk, Kim Hee-chul, Lee Tae-sung, Choi Jin-hyuk, Park Goon))		Special host: Gummy
264	October 24	Ugly Duckling Sons		Special host: Lee Yeon-hee
265	October 31	Ugly Duckling Sons, Kim Jun-ho & Kim Hee-chul		Special host: Heo Sung-tae
266	November 7	Park Goon & Lee Sang-min & Kim Hee-chul, Lee Sang-min & Im Won-hee, Kwak Si-yang	Shindong, Seo Nam-yong	Special host: Han Chae-ah
267	November 14	Im Won-hee & Kim Hee-chul, Lee Sang-min & Kim Jong-kook, Kim Jun-ho & Lee Sang-min & Kwak Si-yang		Special host: Choo Sung-hoon
268	November 21	Kim Hee-chul & Lee Sang-min & Kim Jong-kook, Kim Jun-ho, RalRal	Hyun Joo-yup, Seo Nam-yong	Special host: Son Seok-koo
269	November 28	Im Won-hee & Jung Suk-yong, Choi Si-won & Kim Jun-ho, Tak Jae-hoon & Lee Sang-min & Kim Jun-ho & Kim Jong-kook		Special host: Park Yong-woo
270	December 5	Lee Sang-min, Im Won-hee & Jung Suk-yong, Tak Jae-hoon & Lee Sang-min & Kim Jun-ho & Kim Jong-kook	Do Kyung-wan,Kangnam (singer), Greg, Yoon Ki-won, Bae Do-hwan	Special host: Kim Joo-ryoung
271	December 12	Kim Hee-chul & Choi Si-won, Lee Sang-min & Kim Jun-ho & Kwak Si-yang, Tak Jae-hoon & Lee Sang-min & Kim Jun-ho & Kim Jong-kook	Leeteuk, Yesung, Eunhyuk, Donghae, Kyuhyun, Seo Nam-yong	Special host: Ryu Hyun-jin
272	December 19	Lee Sang-min & Oh Min-suk, Kim Jun-ho, Im Won-hee & Choi Si-won & Jung Suk-yong	Rhymer, Ahn Hyun-mo, Park Sung-kwang, Lee Yi-kyung, Park Sung-woong	Special host: Ryu Hyun-jin
273	December 26	Kim Jun-ho & Kim Jong-min, Im Won-hee & Choi Si-won & Jung Suk-yong, Ugly Duckling Sons (Note: (Tak Jae-hoon, Im Won-hee, Lee Sang-min, Kim Jun-ho, Kim Jong-kook, Kim Jong-min, Kim Hee-chul, Choi Si-won))		Special host: Jin Seon-kyu

== Episodes (2022) ==
List of episodes in 2022 (episode 274–323)

Broadcast episode	Broadcast date	Cast(s)	Guest(s)	Remark
274	January 2	Tony An, Ugly Duckling Sons	Ko Seung Woo	Special host: Jin Seon-kyu; Tony An and his mother Lee Ok-jin return
275	January 9	Kim Jong-min, Im Won-hee & Jung Suk-yong, Lee Sang-min & Tak Jae-hoon	Seo Nam-yong, Ji Sang-ryeol	Special host: Lee Sun-bin
276	January 16	Kwak Si-yang & Kim Jun-ho, Kim Hee-chul, Kim Jong-min, Lee Sang-min & Tak Jae-hoon	Kang Jae-joon, Kim Bok-jun	Special host: Uee
277	January 23	Kim Jong-min & Kim Jun-ho, Ugly Duckling Sons (Note: (Tak Jae-hoon, Im Won-hee, Lee Sang-min, Kim Jun-ho, Kim Jong-kook, Kim Hee-chul, Kim Jong-min, Oh Min-suk, Choi Si-won, Kwak Si-yang))	Seo Nam-yong	Special host: Onew (Shinee)
278	January 30	Im Won-hee, Ugly Duckling Sons	Ji Sang-ryeol, Yoon Ki-won, Bae Do-hwan, Seo Nam-yong	Special host: Jung Eun-ji (Apink)
279	February 6	Kim Jun-ho, Lee Sang-min & Choi Si-won, Ugly Duckling Sons	Hong In-gyu, Kwon Jae-Kwan, Kim Dae-hee, Oh Nami, Park Min, Heo Kyung-hwan, Seo Nam-yong	Special host: Moon Se-yoon
280	February 20	Im Won-hee & Choi Si-won, Lee Sang-min & Choi Si-won, Lee Sang-min, Kim Jun-ho, Kim Hee-chul, Kim Jong-min	Seo Nam-yong, Bae Jung-geun	Special host: Han Hye-jin
281	February 27	Im Won-hee & Kim Jun-ho, Kim Jong-kook, Lee Sang-min & Tak Jae-hoon	Yoon Ki-won, Kang Kyung-Hun, Hong Kyung-min, Jang Hyuk	Special host: Yeon Woo-jin
282	March 6	Im Won-hee & Jung Suk-yong, Lee Sang-min & Tak Jae-hoon & Choi Si-won, Lee Sang-min & Kim Jun-ho & Kim Hee-chul	Kang Jae-joon, Seo Nam-yong, Jo Young-nam	Special host: Sunye
283	March 13	Lee Sang-min & Kim Jun-ho & Park Goon, Tak Jae-hoon & Kim Jun-ho & Kim Jong-kook & Oh Min-suk	Han Young	Special host: Park Hae-joon
284	March 20	Kim Jun-ho & Kim Jong-kook, Lee Sang-min & Kim Jun-ho & Kim Jong-min, Kim Hee-chul & Choi Si-won	Jang Gwang, Jeon Seongae, Jang Yoon-hee, Super Junior	Special host: Park Hae-joon, DinDin
285	March 27	Kwak Si-yang, Ugly Duckling Sons (Note: (Tak Jae-hoon, Lee Sang-min, Kim Jun-ho, Kim Jong-kook, Kim Hee-chul, Oh Min-suk, Choi Si-won))		Special host: Mijoo (Lovelyz)
286	April 3	Im Won-hee & Jung Suk-yong, Tak Jae-hoon & Im Won-hee, Kim Jong-kook & Kim Jong-min & Kim Hee-chul & Choi Si-won	Lee Eun-hyung, Kang Jae-joon, DinDin, Pak Se-ri, Kim Seong-yeon, Oh Yeon-ji, Jeon Kyu-mi, Wi Ji-sun	Special host: Son Ho-jun
287	April 10	Kim Jong-kook & Kim Jong-min & Kim Hee-chul & Choi Si-won, Ugly Duckling Sons, Lee Sang-min & Park Goon	DinDin, Pak Se-ri, Kim Seong-yeon, Oh Yeon-ji, Jeon Kyu-mi, Wi Ji-sun, Han Young	Special host: Son Ho-jun
288	April 17	Kim Jun-ho, Kim Jong-kook & Kim Jong-min, Tak Jae-hoon & Lee Sang-min & Kim Jun-ho & Kim Jong-kook	Ji Sang-ryeol	Special host: Kim Sang-kyung; Kim Jong-kook's mother Cho Hye-seon absent, Actress Jeon Seongae joined in mother's panel
289	April 24	Jang Yoon-hee, Tak Jae-hoon & Lee Sang-min & Kim Jun-ho & Kim Jong-kook, Lee Sang-min & Kim Jun-ho	Kim Tae-hyun,Jang Gwang, Ji Sang-ryeol, Jo Young-nam, Kim Soo-mi	Special host: Kim Sang-kyung; Kim Jong-kook's mother Cho Hye-seon absent, Actress Jeon Seongae joined in mother's panel
290	May 1	Kim Jun-ho & Kim Jong-min, Choi Si-won & Kim Jun-ho, Lee Sang-min & Im Won-hee & Park Goon		Special host: Psy
291	May 8	DinDin & Kim Jong-min, Choi Si-won, Lee Sang-min, Kim Jun-ho, Kim Hee-chul & Kim Jong-kook, Lee Sang-min & Im Won-hee & Park Goon	Han Young	Special host: Psy; New Son DinDin appeared
292	May 15	Kim Jun-ho, Ugly Duckling Sons (Note: (Tak Jae-hoon, Im Won-hee, Lee Sang-min, Kim Jun-ho, Kim Jong-kook, Kim Jong-min, Oh Min-suk, Choi Si-won))	Choi Yang-rak, Kang Jae-joon, Kwon Jae-Hwan, Hong In Gyu, Park Goon, Han Young	Special host: Jung Joon-ho
293	May 22	Lee Sang-min & Kim Jun-ho, Im Won-hee & Jung Suk-yong & Choi Jin-hyuk, Ugly Duckling Sons	Kim Soo-ro, Park Goon, Han Young	Special host: Jung Joon-ho
294	May 29	Lee Sang-min & Kim Hee-chul & Oh Min-suk, Im Won-hee & Jung Suk-yong & Choi Jin-hyuk, Tak Jae-hoon & Im Won-hee & Lee Sang-min & Choi Si-won		Special host: Yoon Kyun-sang
295	June 5	DinDin, Kim Jong-min & Oh Min-suk, Tak Jae-hoon & Im Won-hee & Kim Jun-ho	Jun Won-ju, Kim Young-ok, Ji Sang-ryeol	Special host: So Yoo-jin
296	June 12	Lee Sang-min & Kim Jun-ho, Tak Jae-hoon & Im Won-hee & Kim Jun-ho	Kang Jae-joon	Special host: Shin Dong-wook
297	June 19	Lee Sang-min & Im Won-hee & Choi Jin-hyuk, Tak Jae-hoon & Kim Jun-ho & Kim Hee-chul & Lee Sang-min	Park Goon, Han Young, Heo Kyung-hwan	Special host: Hong Hyun-hee
298	June 26	Kim Jong-kook & DinDin, Kim Jun-ho & Kim Jung-min & Choi Jin-hyuk	Nam Chang-hee, Soya	Special host: Seo Young-hee
299	July 3	Lee Sang-min, Kim Jong-min & DinDin, Tak Jae-hoon & Lee Sang-min & Kim Jun-ho	Lee Dong-Jun, Song Jin-woo, Lee Il-min, Shin Ji, Hyun-Young	Special host: Lee Se-hee
300	July 10	Lee Sang-min, Kim Hee-chul & Kim Jun-ho & Kim Jong-min, Ugly Duckling Sons (Note: (Tak Jae-hoon, Lee Sang-min, Kim Jun-ho, Kim Jong-kook, Kim Hee-chul, Kim Jong-min, Oh Min-suk))	Chae Ri-na, Hwangbo, Jiny, Lee Min-kyung, Esther, Bobby Kim, Kim Ji-min	Special host: Ji Hyun-woo
301	July 17	Lee Sang-min & Kim Jun-ho & Choi Jin-hyuk, Kim Hee-chul & Kim Jun-ho & Kim Jong-min, Ugly Duckling Sons	Kim Ji-min, Hong In-gyu	Special host: Kim Ji-min
302	July 24	Im Won-hee & Kim Jong-kook, Ugly Duckling Sons (Note: (Tak Jae-hoon, Lee Sang-min, Im Won-hee, Kim Jun-ho, Kim Jong-kook, Kim Hee-chul, Kim Jong-min, Oh Min-suk, Choi Jin-hyuk, Heo Kyung-hwan))		Special host: Choi Daniel; New Son Heo Kyung-hwan appeared
303	July 31	DinDin, Ugly Duckling Sons	Lee Guk-joo	Special host: Jin Seo-yeon
304	August 7	Lee Sang-min & Kim Jun-ho, Kim Jun-ho, Ugly Duckling Sons	Kim Ji-min	Special host: Chung Ha
305	August 14	Heo Kyung-hwan, Kim Jun-ho, Lee Sang-min & Tak Jae-hoon & Kim Hee-chul	Park Sung-kwang, Kim Won-hyo, Kim Ji-ho, Kim Ji-min, Hwang Bo-ra, Jung Yi-rang	Special host: Choi Yeo-jin
306	August 21	Kim Jong-min, Lee Sang-min & Tak Jae-hoon & Kim Hee-chul, Lee Sang-min & Kim Jong-kook & Heo Kyubg-hwan	Shin Ji, Bbaek Ga	Special host: Zico (Block B)
307	August 28	Im Won-hee & Heo Kyung-hwan & DinDin, Lee Sang-min & Tak Jae-hoon & Kim Hee-chul, Lee Sang-min & Im Won-hee & Kim Jong-min & Choi Jin-hyuk		Special host: Jang Wooyoung (2PM)
308	September 4	Kim Jun-hoo, Lee Sang-min & Im Won-hee & Kim Jong-min & Choi Jin-hyuk, Kim Jun-hoo & Heo Kyung-hwan & Tak Jae-hoon	Kang Jae-joon, Lee Jung-jin, Lee Kyung-kyu	Special host: Eom Ji-yoon
309	September 11	Lee Sang-min & Im Won-hee & Kim Jong-min & Choi Jin-hyuk, Heo Kyung-hwan, Lee Sang-min & Kim Jun-ho & Kim Jong-kook & Kim Hee-chul & Oh Min-suk	Lee Sang-joon	Special host: Shin Bong-sun
310	September 18	Im Won-hee & Kim Jong-min & Choi Jin-hyuk, Im Won-hee, Lee Sang-min & Kim Jun-ho & Heo Kyung-hwan	Nam Chang-hee, Kim Yong-myung, Kim Ji-min	Special host: Joo Jong-hyuk
311	September 25	Kim Jong-min, Im Won-hee & Kim Jong-kook & Heo Kyung-hwan & DinDin, Lee Sang-min & Kim Jun-ho & Heo Kyung-hwan	Kim Gyu-ri, Kim Ji-min	Special host: Crush
312	October 2	Kim Jun-ho, Tak Jae-hoon & Lee Sang-min & Kim Jong-kook, Im Won-hee & Kim Jong-kook & Heo Kyung-hwan & DinDin	Ji Sang-ryeol, Hong In-Kyu, Bae Do-hwan	Special host: Jang Hyun-sung
313	October 9	Kim Hee-chul, Ugly Duckling Sons (Note: (Lee Sang-min, Kim Jun-ho, Im Won-hee, Kim Jong-kook, Kim Jong-min, Choi Jin-hyuk, DinDin))	Kim Byeong-ok, Park Jun-gyu, Park Jong-Hyeok	Special host: Jang Sung-kyu
314	October 16	Heo Kyung-hwan, Ugly Duckling Sons, Ugly Duckling Sons (Note: ( Tak Jae-hoon, Kim Jun-ho, Kim Jong-kook, Kim Jong-min, Heo Kyung-hwan))	Oh Jung-tae, Park Hwi-Soon, Kim Kyung-Jin	Special host: Simon Dominic
315	October 23	Ugly Duckling Sons, Im Won-hee	Kim Yong-myung, Nam Chang-hee	Special host: Oh Na-ra
316	November 6	Choi Si-won, Im Won-hee & Kim Jong-min & Choi Jin-hyuk & DinDin, Kim Hee-chul & Lee Sang-min & Kim Jun-ho	Lee Da-hee, Lee Guk-joo, Nam Chang-hee, Jo Woo-jong, Shindong	Special host: Bae Sung-jae
317	November 13	Im Won-hee & Lee Sang-min & Kim Jun-ho, Im Won-hee & Kim Jong-min & Choi Jin-hyuk & DinDin, Kim Hee-chul Lee Sang-min & Kim Jun-ho	Lee Guk-joo, Nam Chang-hee, Lee Dong-Jun, Kim Bo-sung	Special host: Hwasa (Mamamoo)
318	November 20	Heo Kyung-hwan, Ugly Duckling Sons (Note: (Tak Jae-hoon, Lee Sang-min, Im Won-hee, Kim Jun-ho, Kim Jong-kook, Kim Hee-chul, Kim Jong-min, Oh Min-suk, Choi Jin-hyuk, DinDin, Heo Kyung-hwan))	Oh Jung-tae	Special host: Han Ga-in
319	November 27	Ugly Duckling Sons		Special host: Han Ga-in
320	December 4	Lee Sang-min & DinDin, Ugly Duckling Sons	Jo Young-nam, Baek Il-seob, Lee Hyo-chun	Special host: Song Eun-i
321	December 11	Lee Sang-min & Kim Jun-ho & Kim Jong-kook & Kim Hee-chul, Tak Jae-hoon & Lee Sang-min & Kim Jong-kook & DinDin, Im Won-hee & Kim Jong-min & Choi Jin-hyuk	Nam Chang-hee, Kang Jae-joon, Shin Ji, Bbaek Ga	Special host: Kim Bum-soo
322	December 18	Tak Jae-hoon & Lee Sang-min & Kim Jong-kook & DinDin, Kim Hee-chul & DinDin	Nam Chang-hee, Kang Jae-joon, Queen WA$ABII, Giant Pink, Cheetah	Special host: Ahn Young-mi
323	December 25	Tak Jae-hoon & Lee Sang-min & Kim Jun-ho & Kim Jong-min, Kim Hee-chul & Choi Si-won, Lee Sang-min & Kim Jun-ho & Kim Jong-min	Kim Min-kyu, Super Junior, Kim Ji-min	Special host: Jay Park

== Episodes (2023) ==
List of episodes in 2023 (episode 324-374)

Broadcast episode	Broadcast date	Cast(s)	Guest(s)	Remark
324	January 1	Tak Jae-hoon & Kim Jun-ho & Kim Jong-min, Kim Hee-chul & Choi Si-won, Lee Sang-min & Kim Jun-ho	Super Junior, Um Hong-gil	Special host: Shin Hyun-joon
325	January 8	Kim Jong-kook & Heo Kyung-hwan, Im Won-hee & Kim Jong-min & Choi Jin-hyuk, Lee Sang-min & Kim Jun-ho	Um Hong-gil	Special host:Shin Ji
326	January 15	Lee Sang-min & Kim Jun-ho & Heo Kyung-hwan, Ugly Duckling Sons (Note: (Tak Jae-hoon, Lee Sang-min, Im Won-hee, Kim Jun-ho, Kim Jong-kook, Kim Hee-chul, Kim Jong-min, Choi Jin-hyuk, Choi Si-won, Heo Kyung-hwan))	Lee Dong-Jun	Special host:Im Soo-hyang
327	January 22	Im Won-hee, Lee Sang-min & Kim Jun-ho & Heo Kyung-hwan, Ugly Duckling Sons	Jeong Seok-yong, Lee Han-wi, Seo Hyun-chul, Lee Dong-Jun	Special host:Jung Sang-hoon
328	January 29	Heo Kyung-hwan & Kim Jong-min, Im Won-hee & Choi Jin-hyuk, Lee Sang-min & Kim Jong-kook & Kim Hee-chul & DinDin	Jeong Seok-yong	Special host:Lee Kyung-kyu
329	February 5	Lee Sang-min & Kim Jun-ho, Lee Sang-min & Kim Jong-kook & Kim Hee-chul & DinDin, Kim Jun-ho & Kim Jong-min & Heo Kyung-hwan	Kim Ji-min	Special host:Kim Min-kyung
330	February 12	Lee Sang-min & Choi Jin-hyuk, Lee Sang-min & Kim Jun-ho & Heo Kyung-hwan, Tak Jae-hoon & Kim Jun-ho & Kim Jong-min	Choi Min-soo	Special host:Park Hyung-sik
331	February 19	Lee Sang-min & Kim Jong-min, Im Won-hee, Ugly Duckling Sons (Note: (Tak Jae-hoon, Lee Sang-min, Kim Jun-ho, Kim Jong-min, Choi Jin-hyuk, DinDin, Heo Kyung-hwan))	Ji Sang-ryeol, Defconn, Nam Chang-hee, Kim Yong-myung, Lee Dong-Jun	Special host:Joo Hyun-young
332	February 26	Kim Min-kyung, Lee Sang-min, Ugly Duckling Sons	Kim Ji-min, Heo Min, Oh Na-mi, Jo Young-nam, Baek Il-seob, Lee Hyo-chun, Lee Dong-Jun	Special host:Kim Nam-hee
333	March 5	Tak Jae-hoon & Lee Sang-min & Im won-hee & Kim Jong-min, Kim Hee-chul & Im Won-hee & DinDin, Tak Jae-hoon & Lee Sang-min & Kim Jun-ho & Kim Jong-min & Kim Hee-chul	Park Wan-kyu, Kim Jong-seo	Special host:Lee Yong-jin
334	March 12	Lee Sang-min & Kim Jong-min, Ugly Duckling Sons, (Note: (Tak Jae-hoon, Lee Sang-min, Kim Jun-ho, Kim Jong-kook, Kim Jong-min)) Kim Jun-ho & Choi Jin-hyuk & Kim Min-kyung	Elody, Muzie, Yu Minsang, Park Chul-min, Chun Myung-Hoon, Pung Ja, Kim Ji-min	Special host:Kim Ji-hoon
335	March 19	Tak Jae-hoon & Lee Sang-min & Kim Jun-ho, Im Won-hee, Lee Sang-min & Kim Jun-ho & Heo Kyung-hwan & Choi Si-won	Jung Suk-yong	Special host:Shin Ye-eun
336	March 26	Lee Sang-min & Kim Jun-ho, Heo Kyung-hwan & DinDin, Tak Jae-hoon & Lee Sang-min & Kim Jun-ho	Park Sung-kwang, Kim Ji-ho, Kim Won-hyo, Shim Jin-hwa	Special host:Joo Woo-jae
337	April 2	Ugly Duckling Sons, (Note: (Tak Jae-hoon, Kim Jong-kook, Choi Si-won, Heo Kyung-hwan, DinDin, Kim Min-Kyung)) Lee Sang-min & Kim Jong-kook & Kim Jong-min, Im Won-hee & Kim Hee-chul & Choi Jin-hyuk	Kang Jae-joon, Lee Eun-Hyung, Kim Hye-Seon, Oh Na-Mi, Kim Seung-Hye, Lee Soo-ji	Special host:Jang Hang-jun
338	April 9	Lee Sang-min & Kim Jong-kook & Kim Jong-min, Ugly Duckling Sons, Lee Sang-min	Kang Jae-joon, Lee Eun-Hyung, Kim Hye-Seon, Oh Na-Mi, Kim Seung-Hye	Special host:Kim Gun-woo
339	April 16	Lee Sang-min & Kim Jong-kook, Lee Sang-min & Kim Jong-min, Kim Jong-min & Heo Kyung-hwan & DinDin	Elody	Special host:Pyo Ye-jin
340	April 23	Lee Sang-min & Kim Jong-min & Kim Hee-chul, Tak Jae-hoon & Lee Sang-min & Kim Jong-kook & Choi Jin-hyuk & DinDin, Lee Sang-min & Kim Jong-min	Lee Sang-joon, Sleepy, Elody	Special host:Aiki
341	April 30	Kim Gun-woo, Tak Jae-hoon & Lee Sang-min, Im Won-hee	Jeong Seok-yong	Special host:Lee Seok-hoon
342	May 7	Kim Jong-min & DinDin & Kim Jun-ho, Tak Jae-hoon & Lee Sang-min, Kim Gun-woo	Kim Tae-gyun	Special host:Kwak Sun-young
343	May 14	Kim Jun-ho, Kim Jong-kook & Heo Kyung-hwan	Kim Ji-min, Choi Yang-Rak, Paeng Hyun-sook	Special host:Kim Sun-young
344	May 21	Kim Jong-kook, Lee Sang-min & Kim Jong-min & Heo Kyung-hwan, Lee Sang-min & Kim Jong-min	Joo Woo-jae, BECBALSONIONDAN, Elody	Special host:Chun Woo-hee
345	May 28	Ugly Duckling Sons, (Note: (Tak Jae-hoon, Lee Sang-min, Kim Jun-ho, Kim Jong-kook, Kim Hee-chul, Choi Si-won, DinDin, Kim Gun-woo)) Heo Kyung-hwan		Special host:Lee Joon-hyuk
346	June 4	Ugly Duckling Sons		Special host:Choi Jung-hoon
347	June 11	Lee Sang-min & Kim Jun-ho, Kim Jong-kook & Kim Gun-woo, Lee Sang-min & Im Won-hee	Jeon Won-joo, Jung Chan-sung, Jeong Seok-yong	Special host:Ryu Soo-young
348	June 18	Im Won-hee & Kim Jong-min & Choi Jin-hyuk, Tak Jae-hoon & Lee Sang-min & Kim Jun-ho, Lee Sang-min & DinDin	Yoon Min-soo, Kim Young-ok, Sleepy, Hyunyoung	Special host:Myung Se-bin
349	June 25	Tak Jae-hoon & Im Won-hee & Kim Jong-min, Ugly Duckling Sons, (Note: (Tak Jae-hoon, Lee Sang-min, Kim Jun-ho, Im Won-hee, Kim Jong-min, Kim Hee-chul, Choi Jin-hyuk)) Lee Sang-min & Kim Jun-ho	Kangnam, Kim Hye-sun	Special host:Park Sung-woong
350	July 2	Lee Sang-min & Kim Jong-kook & Kim Jong-min, Tak Jae-hun & Kim Jun-ho, Ugly Duckling Sons	Shin Gyu-jin, Johan Kim, Muzie	Special host:Jang Dong-min
351	July 9	Lee Sang-min & Tak Jae-hun, Im Won-hee & Heo Kyung-hwan, Kim Jun-ho & Heo Kyung-hwan	Muzie, Jeong Seok-yong, Lee Hyun-yi, Song Hae-na, Jang Dong-min, Yoo Se-yoon, Kang Yu-Mi, Lee Sang-ho, Lee Sang-min	Special host:Jin Goo
352	July 16	Lee Sang-min & Kim Jun-ho & Kim Jong-min & Kim Hee-chul, Kim Jun-ho & Heo Kyung-hwan	Jang Dong-min, Yoo Se-yoon, Kang Yu-Mi, Lee Sang-ho, Lee Sang-min, Kang Jae-jun	Special host:Lee Eun-ji
353	July 23	Im Won-hee & Kim Jun-ho & Lee Sang-min, Lee Sang-min & Kim Jong-kook & Kim Jong-min, Im Won-hee & Heo Kyung-hwan	Yoon Hyeong-bin, Jeong Kyeong-mi, Kim Ji-sun, Jun Won-ju, Sunwoo Yong-nyeo, Lee Kyung-sil, Jeong Seok-yong	Special host: Park Sun-young
354	July 30	Ugly Duckling Sons, (Note: (Tak Jae-hoon, Im Won-hee, Kim Jun-ho, Kim Jong-min, Heo Kyung-hwan, DinDin, Kim Gun-woo)) Kim Hee-chul & DinDin & Kim Gun-woo, Lee Sang-min & Kim Jun-ho	Kang Jae-joon, Yoo Jun-sang, Ko Chang-seok, Oh Man-seok Lee Dae-ho	Special host:Lee Sang-yi
355	August 6	Park Sun-young, Kim Jong-kook, Ugly Duckling Sons	Kang Kyung-hun, Choi Sung-kook, Jo Hana, Cha Tae-hyun	Special host:Park Byung-eun
356	August 13	Im won-hee & Heo Kyung-hwan, Lee Sang-min & Kim Jun-ho, Im Won-hee & Choi Jin-hyuk & Kim Jong-min & Heo Kyung-hwan	Choi Yeo-jin, Koyote	Special host:Park Hae-jin
357	August 20	Park Sun-young, Im Won-hee & Choi Jin-hyuk & Kim Jong-min, Lee Sang-min & Kim Jun-ho	Kang Kyung-hun, Jo Hana, Choi Hyun Woo, Kangnam, Lee Sang-hwa	Special host:Yang Se-hyung
358	August 27	Go Jun, Ugly Duckling Sons, (Note: (Tak Jae-hoon, Im Won-hee, Lee Sang-min, Kim Jun-ho, Kim Jong-kook, Heo Kyung-hwan, Kim Hee-chul, Kim Gun-woo)) Lee Sang-min & Kim Jun-ho & Kim Gun-woo	Kim Bo-sung, Seo Nam-yong	Special host:Ko Woo-rim
359	September 3	Kim Jun-ho, Im Won-hee & Lee Sang-min, Ugly Duckling Sons	Kim Ji-min, Jeong Seok-yong	Special host:Jang Yoon-jeong
360	September 10	Kim Jun-ho, Im Won-hee & Kim Jong-min	Kim Ji-min	Special host:Kwon Oh-joong
361	September 17	Tak Jae-hoon & Lee Sang-min & Im Won-hee & Kim Jong-min, Lee Sang-min & Kim Jong-min	Kim Seung-soo	Special host: Lim Young-woong
362	October 8	Tak Jae-hoon & Lee Sang-min & Im Won-hee & Kim Jong-min, Kim Jun-ho & Heo Kyung-hwan, Kim Jong-min	Lee Yeon-bok, Kim Ji-min, Kim Dong-wan, Danny Ahn, Brian Joo, Lee Ji-hyun, Oh Seung-eun, Chae Yeon	Special host: Lim Young-woong
363	October 15	Lee Sang-min & Kim Jong-kook, Kim Jong-min & Heo Kyung-hwan & Kim Gun-wo, Lee Sang-min & Im Won-hee & Kim Jong-min	Jun Won-ju, Sunwoo Yong-nyeo	Special host: Kang Ha-neul
364	October 22	Tak Jae-hoon & Kim Jong-kook & Heo Kyung-hwan & Kim Hee-chul & Choi Jin-hyuk, Lee Sang-min & Kim Jong-kook, Im Won-hee & Kim Jong-min & Choi Jin-hyuk	Jun Won-ju, Sunwoo Yong-nyeo	Special host: Hwang Jung-eum
365	October 29	Lee Dong-gun, Ugly Duckling Sons (Note: (Tak Jae-hoon, Im Won-hee, Lee Sang-min, Kim Jun-ho, Kim Jong-kook, Heo Kyung-hwan, Kim Jong-min, Kim Hee-chul, Choi Jin-hyuk, Din Din))	Muzie	Special host: Park Ha-sun; New Son Lee Dong-gun appeared
366	November 5	Lee Dong-gun, Lee Sang-min & Kim Jun-ho, Kim Jong-kook & Kim Gun-wo	Kim Bo-sung, Jung Chan-sung	Special host: Tablo
367	November 12	Han Hye-jin, Kim Seung-soo & Kim Jong-min		Special host: Lee Si-eon; New Daughter Han Hye-jin appeared
368	November 19	Lee Dong-gun, Woo Sang-hyeok, Lee Sang-min & Im Won-hee	Kim Ji-seok, Chon Jong-won, Jun Woong-tae, Jeong Seok-yong	Special host: Kim Kwang-kyu
369	November 26	Kim Seung-soo, Lee Sang-min & Kim Jun-ho & Lee Dong-gun		Special host: Lee Young-ae
370	December 3	Han Hye-jin, Kim Jong-kook & Kim Hee-chul & Im Won-hee, Lee Dong-gun	Song Ga-in	Special host:Kim Hae-sook
371	December 10	Lee Dong-gun, Lee Sang-min & Kim Jun-ho		Special host:Kim Na-young
372	December 17	Han Hye-jin, Kim Jun-ho & Kim Jong-min, Kim Jong-kook	Lee Hyun-yi, Jin Jung-seon, Ji Hyeon Jung, Hong Jin-ho, Jang Dong-min, Jonathan, Patricia Yiombi	Special host:Kim Ji-eun
373	December 24	Tak Jae-hoon & Lee Sang-min, Lee Dong-gun, Han hye-jin		Special host:Han Hye-jin
374	December 31	Lee Sang-min, Han hye-jin, Im won-hee & Kim Jun-ho & Kim Hee-chul & Choi Si-won	Bbaek Ga, Seo Nam-yong	Special host:Han Hye-jin

== Episodes (2024) ==
List of episodes in 2024 (episode 375-423)

Broadcast episode	Broadcast date	Cast(s)	Guest(s)	Remark
375	January 7	Kim Seung-soo & Lee Sang-min, Ugly Duckling Sons (Note: (Tak Jae-hoon, Im Won-hee, Lee Sang-min, Kim Jun-ho, Kim Jong-kook, Heo Kyung-hwan, Kim Jong-min, Kim Hee-chul, Lee Dong-gun, Din Din, Kim Gun-woo))		Special host:Ha Ji-won
376	January 14	Kim Hee-chul, Kim Jong-kook, Kim Jun-ho & Lee Dong-gun	Eun Ji-won, Hoju Tarzan, Ma Sun-ho	Special host:Ha Ji-won
377	January 21	Kim Jun-ho & Heo Kyung-hwan, Lee Dong-gun		Special host:Ra Mi-ran
378	January 28	Kim Seung-soo, Lee Sang-min & Kim Jun-ho & Tak Jae-hoon, Lee Dong-gun	Park Ho-san, Wang Bit-na, Kim So-eun, Kim Ji-an, Yang Dae-hyuk, Kang Boo-ja	Special host:Kim Ho-joong
379	February 4	Kim Seung-soo, Heo Kyung-hwan	Oh Jung-tae	Special host:Ahn Bo-hyun
380	February 11	Kim Seung-soo & Lee Sang-min, Lee Dong-gun, Na Sun-Uk	Park Kwang-Jae, Sung Hyuk	Special host:Kim Jung-eun
381	February 18	Kim Seung-soo, Lee Sang-min & Kim Hee-chul, Kim Jong-kook & Kim Jong-min & Heo Kyung-hwan	BamBam	Special host:Lee Yi-kyung
382	February 25	Im Hyun-sik & Kim Jun-ho & Im Won-hee, Tak Jae-hoon & Im Won-hee, Lee Dong-gun	Ye Ji-won, Park Kwang-Jae, Hyun Joo-yup	Special host:Ji Seung-hyun
383	March 3	Kim Ho-joong, Kim Hee-chul, Lee Sang-min & Kim Jun-ho & Im Won-hee & Han hye-jin	Jang Keun-suk, Lee Hong-gi, Park Se-ra, Cha Seo-rin	Special host:Song Hae-na
384	March 10	Kim Seung-soo, Kim Seung-soo & Lee Sang-min & Im Won-hee & Heo Kyung-hwan, Kim Jun-ho	Yang Jung-a, Jo Hye-ryun, Jang Dong-min	Special host:Kim Jae-wook
385	March 17	Han Hye-jin, Heo Kyung-hwan		Special host:Joo Won
386	March 24	Kim Seung-soo, Han Hye-jin, Eun Ji-won	Park Jung-chul, Jun Jin, Moon Ga-young, Doyoung, Lee Soo-hyuk, Kim Seung-hoo, Baek Jun-yeong	Special host:Kim Nam-joo
387	March 31	Im Hyun-sik & Kim Jun-ho & Im Won-hee, Han Hye-jin, Lee Sang-min & Kim Hee-chul & Eun Ji-won	Lee Si-eon	Special host:Choi Soo-jong
388	April 7	Choi Jin-hyuk, Kim Seung-soo, Lee Sang-min		Special host:Choi Soo-jong
389	April 14	Kim Seung-soo & Lee Sang-min, Lee Sang-min & Kim Jun-ho, Im Won-hee	Jeong Seok-yong	Special host:Lee Joon
390	April 21	Kim Seung-soo & Lee Sang-min, Eun Ji-won, Tak Jae-hoon & Kim Jun-ho & Kim Jong-kook	Lee Soo-geun	Special host:Boom
391	April 28	Kim Hee-chul, Kim Seung-soo & Lee Sang-min, Lee Sang-min & Kim Jun-ho	Jang Keun-suk, Kim Byeong-oh	Special host:Lee Chan-won
392	May 5	Kim Seung-soo, Lee Sang-min & Choi Jin-hyuk	Yang Jung-a, Son Ji-chang, Oh Yeon-soo	Special host:Kang June
393	May 12	Kim Seung-soo, Lee Dong-gun, Han Hye-jin	Yoon Da-hoon	Special host:Lena Park
394	May 19	Kim Hee-chul & Eun Ji-won & Kim Jong-min, Lee Dong-gun & Kim Jun-ho, Choi Jin-hyuk	Ryu Jung-soo	Special host:Lee Kyu-hyung
395	May 26	Kim Jong-kook & Lee Dong-gun & Heo Kyung-hwan & Kim Hee-chul		Special host:Lee Seung-chul
396	June 2	Kim Jong-kook & Lee Dong-gun & Heo Kyung-hwan & Kim Hee-chul, Lee Sang-min & Im Won-hee	Jeong Seok-yong	Special host:Song Seung-heon
397	June 9	Bae Sung-jae, Lee Sang-min & Kim Jong-kook & Choi Jin-hyuk	Yein (Lovelyz)	Special host:Ahn Young-mi
398	June 16	Bae Sung-jae, Kim Seung-soo, Lee Sang-min	Park Geun-hyung, Lee Sang-yeob	Special host:Kwon Yul
399	June 23	Kim Seung-soo, Yoon Sung-ho, Lee Sang-min & Kim Jong-kook & Lee Dong-gun	Son Ji-chang	Special host:Oh Yeon-soo
400	June 30	Kim Seung-soo & Kim Jun-ho, Lee Sang-min & Kim Jong-kook & Im Won-hee, Lee Sang-min & Kim Jun-ho	Sunwoo Yong-nyeo, Ahn Moon-Sook	Special host:Jang Na-ra
401	July 7	Kim Seung-soo, Bae Sung-jae, Lee Sang-min	Yang Jung-a, Yoo Tae-Woong, Yoo Seo-Jin, Park Hyung-Joon, Park Tae-hwan, Lee Yong-dae, Sayuri Fujita	Special host:Choi Hwa-jung
402	July 14	Lee Sang-min & Lee Dong-gun, No Min-woo, Han Hye-jin	Poongja	Special host:Jin Sung
403	July 21	Kim Seung-soo & Heo Kyung-hwan & Kim Hee-chul, Lee Dong-gun, Bae Sung-jae	Gu Bon-seung, Park Moon-sung	Special host:Nam Jin
No broadcast on July 28 and August 4 due to the live coverage of the 2024 Summer Olympics.
404	August 11	Kim Hee-chul & Eun Ji-won & Kim Jong-kook & Lee Dong-gun, Kim Seung-soo & Lee Sang-min & Kim Il-woo, Im Won-hee & Heo Kyung-hwan	Gree	Special host:Nam Jin
405	August 18	Kim Seung-soo, Tak Jae-hoon & Heo Kyung-hwan & Kim Hee-chul & Kim Gun-woo	Yang Jung-a	Special host:Kim Young-chul
406	August 25	Bae Jung-nam, Bae Sung-jae, Kim Seung-soo & Im Won-hee	Park Ji-sung	Special host:Yoon Jong-shin
407	September 1	Choi Jin-hyuk, Kim Hee-chul & Eun Ji-won & Kim Seung-soo, Lee Dong-gun	Han Sung-ho	Special host:Yoon Se-ah
408	September 8	Kim Seung-soo & Lee Sang-min, Han Hye-jin, Lee Sang-min & Im Won-hee	Lee Si-eon, Ahn Moon-Sook	Special host:Ji Jin-hee
409	September 15	Choi Jin-hyuk & Jung Young-joo, Lee Sang-min & Kim Jun-ho, Lee Sang-min & Han Hye-jin & Bea Jung-nam	Hong Seo-beom, Jo Gap-kyung, Seo Jang-hoon	Special host:Bae Jong-ok; New Daughter Jung Young-joo appeared
410	September 22	Lee Yong-dae, Lee Sang-min & Choi Jin-hyuk, Eun Ji-won	Jung Suk-yong, Bae Hae-sun, Seo In-guk, Lee Si-eon	Special host:Kim Jung-nan; New Son Lee Yong-dae appeared
411	September 29	Im Hyun-sik, Choi Jin-hyuk & Jung Young-joo, Kim Seung-soo & Lee Sang-min	Lee Gun-Joo, Lee Bon	Special host:Song Il-kook
412	October 6	Kim Seung-soo, Rhymer & Lee Sang-min, Bae Jung-nam	Lee Jae-hwang, Oh Chang-seok, Byun Yo-han	Special host:Kim Jung-hyun
413	October 13	Im Won-hee & Kim Jong-min & Choi Jin-hyuk, Jung Young-joo, Bae Sung-jae & Lee Yong-dae		Special host:Jang Shin-young
414	October 20	Kim Jong-kook & Kim Jun-ho & Kim Hee-chul, Han Hye-jin, Kim Young-chul	Hwangbo	Special host:Insooni; New Son Kim Young-chul appeared
415	October 27	Kim Seung-soo & Im Won-hee	Ahn Moon-sook, Yang Jung-a	Special host:Young Tak
416	November 3	Kim Seung-soo & Im Won-hee, Eun Ji-won & Kim Jong-min & Choi Jin-hyuk	Ahn Moon-sook, Yang Jung-a, Ji Il-joo	Special host:Kim Se-jeong
417	November 10	Kim Jong-kook & Lee Dong-gun & Heo Kyung-hwan & Kim Hee-chul		Special host:Song Ga-in; Mother's trip with their sons, Father's sitting in the studio
418	November 17	Kim Jong-kook & Lee Dong-gun & Heo Kyung-hwan & Kim Hee-chul, Kim Seung-soo & Kim Hee-chul	Kim Jung-min	Special host:Kim Yon-ja; Mother's trip with their sons, Father's sitting in the studio
419	November 24	Kim Jun-ho & Lee Dong-gun & Lee Yong-dae, Bae Jung-nam, Choi Jin-hyuk	Lee Chun-hee, Jeon Hye-jin, Aiki	Special host:Wi Ha-joon
420	December 1	Kim Seung-soo & Heo Kyung-hwan, Bae Sung-jae & Lee Yong-dae, Lee Sang-min & Bae Jung-nam & Lee Dong-gun	Oh Sang-uk	Special host:Choi Min-ho
421	December 8	Lee Sang-min & Kim Hee-chul, Lee Yong-dae, Lee Sang-min & Heo Kyung-hwan & Bae Jung-nam	Chun Jung-myung, Jang Sung-kyu, Yeo Kyung-rae	Special host:Kim Jae-young
422	December 15	Kim Seung-soo	Son Ji-chang, Yang Jung-a	Special host:Oh Yoon-ah
423	December 22	Kim Jun-ho & Lee Sang-min, Choi Jin-hyuk	Kim Ji-min	Special host:Lee Hyun-yi
No broadcast on December 29 due to special coverage of the Jeju Air Flight 2216 crash.

== Episodes (2025) ==
List of episodes in 2025 (episode 424-475)

Broadcast episode	Broadcast date	Cast(s)	Guest(s)	Remark
424	January 5	Choi Jin-hyuk, Jung Young-joo	Jeong Suk-yong	Special host:Shin Sung-rok
425	January 12	Kim Jong-min & Kim Hee-chul, Kim Seung-soo & Lee Sang-min & Lee Dong-gun		Special host:Jin Tae-hyun
426	January 19	Im Won-hee, Kim Jun-ho & Lee Yong-dae, Lee Sang-min	Jeong Suk-yong, Im Hyun-sik, Lee Gun-Joo	Special host:Jung Joon-ho
427	January 26	Ugly Duckling Sons (Note: (Tak Jae-hoon, Im Won-hee, Lee Sang-min, Kim Jun-ho, Kim Jong-kook, Heo Kyung-hwan, Kim Jong-min, Kim Hee-chul, Choi Jin-hyuk))		Special host:Uhm Ji-won
428	February 2	Lee Dong-gun, Lee Sang-min	Lucky, Fabien Yoon	Special host:Go Ara
429	February 9	Lee Sang-min & Kim Jong-min & Bae Jung-nam, Jung Young-joo, Ugly Duckling Sons (Note: (Tak Jae-hoon, Im Won-hee, Lee Sang-min, Kim Seung-soo, Heo Kyung-hwan, Lee Dong-gun, Choi Jin-hyuk))	Song Hae-na	Special host:Kim Jun-hyun
430	February 16	Kim Seung-soo & Kim Jong-kook & Kim Jun-ho, Kim Seung-soo & Lee Sang-min		Special host:Kyung Soo-jin
431	February 23	Im Won-hee & Lee Sang-min, Lee Sang-min & Tony An & & Kim Hee-chul, Kim Seung-soo	Lee Jong-hyuk	Special host:Yoon Min-soo
432	March 2	Lee Sang-min & Kim Jong-min, Kim Jong-kook & Kim Jun-ho & Kim Jong-min, Tak Jae-hoon & Lee Sang-min	Yang Joon-hyuk	Special host:Kim Ok-vin
433	March 9	Kim Jun-ho & Kim Jong-min, Kim Seung-soo	Im Ho, Song Il-kook	Special host:Sung Hoon
434	March 16	Lee Sang-min & Kim Jun-ho & Lee Yong-dae, Im Won-hee & Kim Jong-min, Kim Young-chul	Jeong Suk-yong, Oh Ji-heon, Park Hwi-soon, Oh Jeong-tae,	Special host:Eugene
435	March 23	Lee Sang-min & Kim Jun-ho & Lee Yong-dae, Kim Hee-chul	Son Dam-bi, Lee Kyou-hyuk	Special host:Gummy
436	March 30	Kim Jong-min, Hwang Karam	Na Yeong-seok, Kim Seung-woo, Yunho, Yoon Shi-yoon	Special host:Bae Sung-jae
437	April 6	Kim Jun-ho & Im Won-hee & Tony Ahn, Kim Jun-ho, Kim Seung-soo	Im Hyun-sik	Special host:Daesung
438	April 13	Kim Young-chul, Kim Jong-kook & Lee Dong-gun & Kim Hee-chul & Choi Jin-hyuk, Jung Young-joo	Oh Jung-tae	Special host:Lee Yo-won
439	April 20	Kim Jun-ho & Kim Hee-chul & Choi Jin-hyuk, Bae Jung-nam, Kim Seung-soo & Kim Jong-kook	Kim Eung-soo	Special host:Ji Ye Eun
440	April 27	Yoon Hyun-min, Kim Jun-ho & Kim Jong-min	Jeon Won-joo	Special host:Jang Keun-suk; New Son Yoon Hyun-min appeared
441	May 4	Tony Ahn, Ugly Duckling Sons (Note: (Tak Jae-hoon, Lee Sang-min, Kim Jun-ho, Kim Jong-min, Heo Kyung-hwan, Kim Hee-chul, Choi Jin-hyuk))	Oh Jung-tae	Special host:Shin-Soo Choo
442	May 11	Lee Hong-gi, Lee Sang-min & Kim Jun-ho & Seo Jang-hoon		Special host:Kim Ji-ho; New Son Lee Hong-gi appeared
443	May 18	Lee Sang-min & Lee Dong-gun, Lee Sang-min & Kim Jun-ho	Ryu Jung-soo, Gu Bon-seung	Special host:Lee Sang-yeob
444	May 25	Kim Jun-ho, Kim Seung-soo & Im Won-hee & Heo Kyung-hwan	Yoo Ji-tae, Lee Kyung-shil, Lee Seong-mi, Jo Hye-ryun, Seven, Lee Da-hae, Yuk Jun-seo	Special host:Heo Sung-tae
445	June 1	Yoon Shi-yoon, Im Won-hee	Jeong Suk-yong	Special host:Kang Daniel; New Son Yoon Shi-yoon appeared
446	June 8	Yoon Hyun-min & Choi Jin-hyuk, Kim Seung-soo & Kim Jun-hoo & Heo Kyung-hwan, Jung Young-joo	Lee Guk-joo	Special host:Choo Sung-hoon
447	June 15	Im Won-hee, Lee Dong-gun, Lee Hong-gi	Jeong Suk-yong	Special host:Jang Hee-jin
448	June 22	Kim Jun-hoo & Yoon Hyun-min & Choi Jin-hyuk, Yoon Shi-yoon		Special host:Jo Hyun-ah
449	June 29	Lee Sang-min & Lee Dong-gun & Kim Hee-chul, Jung Young-joo, Kim Jong-kook & Heo Kyung-hwan	Kim Jun-hyun, Jonathan, Ma Sun-ho	Special host:Kim Nam-joo
450	July 6	Lee Sang-min, Heo Kyung-hwan & Choi Jin-hyuk & Lee Yong-dae	Oh Jeong-tae	Special host:Kim Eana
451	July 13	Lee Sang-min & Im Won-hee & Kim Jun-ho, Han Hye-jin, Yoon Shi-yoon	Poonja, Shin Gi-ru	Special host:Oh Na-ra
452	July 20	Choi Jin-hyuk & Yoon Hyun-min, Lee Sang-min & Bae Jung-nam		Special host:Lee Soo-ji
453	July 27	Kim Jun-ho, Choi Jin-hyuk & Yoon Hyun-min	Kim Ji-min	Special host:Lee Jung-eun
454	August 3	Kim Jun-ho, Lee Sang-min & Bae Jung-nam	Kim Ji-min	Special host:Lee Kyung-kyu
455	August 10	Heo Kyung-hwan & Kim Hee-chul, Heo Kyung-hwan & Kim Jun-ho, Yoon Shi-yoon & Kim Jun-ho	Ha Eun-joo, Ha Seung-Jin, Kim Jong-min	Special host:Ahn Jae-wook
456	August 17	Yoon Shi-yoon, Kim Hee-Chul & Bae Jung-nam & Hyun Bong-sik, Yoon Hyun-min		Special host:Jung Il-woo
457	August 24	Yoon Min-soo, Yoon Shi-yoon		Special host:Lee Sun-bin; New Son Yoon Min-soo appeared
458	August 31	Jo Hyun-ah, Yoon Min-soo, Im Won-hee & Kim Seung-soo	Lee Jong-hyuk	Special host:Lee Seok Hoon
459	September 7	Yoon Min-soo, Choi Jin-hyuk		Special host:Lee Sung-min
460	September 14	Kim Hee-Chul & Kim Jong-kook, Kim Jun-ho & Kim Jong-min & Yoon Shi-yoon	Kim Dong hyun, Cha Tae-hyun	Special host: Mimi
461	September 21	Yoon Hyun-min, Lee Dong-gun, Im Won-hee & Kim Seung-soo	Shin Seung-hun	Special host: Lee Jun-young
462	September 28	Jo Hyun-ah & Lee Hong-gi, Lee Dong-gun, Yoon Min-soo	Kim Yong-jun	Special host: Shin Ji
463	October 5	Choi Jin-hyuk, Yoon Hyun-min & Jo Hyun-ah		Special host: Han Sun-hwa
464	October 12	Yoon Min-soo, Jo Hyun-ah	Song Ga-in	Special host: Jo Woo-jin
465	October 19	Bae Jung-nam, Yoon Shi-yoon, Yoon Hyun-min & Choi Jin-hyuk	Lee Jang-woo, Jeong Jun-ha	Special host: Kim Byung-chul
466	October 26	Yoon Min-soo, Jo Hyun-ah, Kim Seung-soo & Im Won-hee	Song Haena, Hanhae	Special host: Lee Seung-chul
467	November 2	Yoon Min-soo & Im Won-hee & Kim Hee-chul, Kim Seung-soo, Jo Hyun-ah & Lee Hong-gi	Lee Chang-hoon	Special host: Sunmi
468	November 9	Choi Jin-hyuk, Bae Jung-nam, Im Won-hee & Yoon Hyun-min & Heo Kyung-hwan	Park Kyung-lim, Choi Soo-jong, Hyun Bong-sik, Pyo Chang-won	Special host: Jo Jung-suk
469	November 16	Bae Jung-nam & Han Hye-jin, Eun Ji-won	Kang Seung-yoon, Shaman Go Chun-ja, Shaman Lee Da-young	Special host: Edward Lee (chef)
470	November 23	Im Won-hee & Kim Jun-Ho, Im Won-hee & Heo Kyung-hwan & Kim Jong-min	Pyeon Seung-yeop, Park Yeong-gyu, Eom Young Soo	Special host: Baek Ji-young
471	November 30	Lee Hong-gi, Han Hye-jin & Jo Hyun-ah & Jung Young-joo & Tak Jae-hoon, Yoon Shi-yoon & Oh Min-suk	Jang Keun-suk, Lee Seung-gi	Special host: Bong Tae-gyu
472	December 7	Seo Jang-hoon & Tak Jae-hoon, Lee Sang-min & Kim Jong-min & Kim Seung-soo	Elody, Mafo Laure, Lee Ji-hyun	Special host: Kim Min-jong; Mothers' trip with Seo Jang-hoon and Tak Jae-hoon, Sons sitting in the studio
473	December 14	Seo Jang-hoon & Tak Jae-hoon, Cho Jin-se	Kim Won-hoon	Special host: Kim Min-jong; Mothers' trip with Seo Jang-hoon and Tak Jae-hoon, Sons sitting in the studio New son Cho Jin-se appeared
474	December 21	Han Hye-jin & Eom Ji-yoon, Tak Jae-hoon		Special host: Lee Geum-hee
475	December 28	Han Hye-jin & Eom Ji-yoon, Im Won-hee & Kim Hee-chul & Tak Jae-hoon, Yoo Min-sang	Lee Gwan-hee & Mu Jin-sung, Hong Yoon-hwa & Kim Min-kyung & Kim Jun-ho	Special host: Park Geun-hyung; New son Yoo Min-sang appeared

== Episodes (2026) ==
List of episodes in 2026 (episode 476-present)

Broadcast episode	Broadcast date	Cast(s)	Guest(s)	Remark
476	January 4	Tak Jae-hoon & Shin Dong-yeop & Kim Jun-ho & Cho Jin-se	Ahn Jae-wook & Jung Joon-ho	Special host:Ha Hee-ra
477	January 11	Jung Gun-joo, Jo Hyun-ah & Kim Jong-min, Im Won-hee & Heo Kyung-hwan & Yoon Min-soo	Hong Seok-cheon, Elody, Kim In-man	Special host:Ha Hee-ra; New son Jung Gun-joo appeared
478	January 18	Yoon Min-soo & Kim Min-jong & Young Tak, Park Goon & Lee Sang-min & Im Won-hee, Lee Seung-woo	Song Bum-keun	Special host:Kim Junsu; New son Lee Seung-woo appeared
479	January 25	Heo Kyung-hwan, Yoon Shi-yoon, Kim Hee-chul	Jang Hyuk & Park Tae-hwan, Kang Kyun-sung	Special host:Choi Ji-woo
480	February 1	Bae Jung-nam	Lee Sung-min & Kim Jong-soo & Kim Sung-kyun	Special host:Hwang Min-hyun
481	February 8	Bae Jung-nam, Song Haena	Lee Sung-min & Kim Jong-soo & Kim Sung-kyun	Special host:Kim Min-seok; New daughter Song Haena appeared
482	February 15	Heo Kyung-hwan & Lee Jong-hyuk & Yoon Min-soo, Bae Jung-nam	Lee Moon-jung & Yun Na-ra, Lee Sung-min & Kim Jong-soo & Kim Sung-kyun	Special host:Jin Se-yeon
483	February 22	Tak Jae-hoon, Han Hye-jin & Heo Kyung-hwan & Cho Jin-se, Im Won-hee & Cho Jin-se	Lee Jae-hoon, MC Gree	Special host:Hong Jong-hyun
484	March 1	Heo Kyung-hwan & Lee Dong-gun, Im Won-hee & Choi Jin-hyuk, Kim Min-jae	Park Shin-yang, Jin Kyung	Special host: Moon Chae-won
485	March 8	Kim Seung-soo, Yoon Hyun-min, Lee Dong-gun & Kim Jun-ho	Go Joo-won & Lee Min-woo, Choi Dae-chul	Special host: Yoo Yeon-seok
486	March 15	Heo Kyung-hwan, Bae Yoo-ram	Jo Hye-ryun & Shin Bong-sun & Lee Seong-mi & Kim Soo-yong & Yoo Min-sang, Lee Je-hoon & Kim Eui-sung & Pyo Ye-jin & Jang Hyuk-jin	Special host: Ha Ji-won; New son Bae Yoo-ram appeared
487	March 22	Im Won-hee & Kim Seung-soo, Kim Hee-chul & Bae Jung-nam, Yoon Si-yoon & Heo Kyung-hwan	Kim Byung-se, Lee Ho-cheol & Tae Hang-ho, Dong Hyun Kim & Amotti	Special host: Park Jin-hee
488	March 29	Ugly Duckling Sons (Note: (Tak Jae-hoon, Im Won-hee, Lee Sang-min, Choi Jin-hyuk, Yoon Hyun-min, Yoon Si-yoon, Cho Jin-se))	Choi Hong-man, Nam Gyu-ri, Knee Kim Yeon-ji, Lee Bo-ram	Special host: Lee Yeon-hee
489	April 5	Heo Kyung-hwan, Kim Jun-ho & Im Won-hee & Kim Jong-min, Choi Jin-hyuk & Yoon Hyun-min	Yang Sang-guk & Park Sung-jun(fortune teller), Kim Ji-min, Lee Guk-joo	Special host: Shin Seung-hun
490	April 12	Kim Seung-soo, Kim Hee-chul & Tak Jae-hoon & Heo Kyung-hwan	Lee Beom-soo	Special host: Park Joong-hoon
491	April 19	Choi Jin-hyuk & Yoon Hyun-min & Kim Jong-min, Han Hye-jin & Eom Ji-yoon, Heo Kyung-hwan & Kim Jong-min	Kim Ji-yu, Yang Chi-seung	Special host: Yeon Woo-jin
492	April 26	Im Won-hee & Yoon Hyun-min & Tak Jae-hoon & Kim Hee-chul, Heo Kyung-hwan & Choi Jin-hyuk & Kim Jun-ho,	Yuk Joong-wan	Special host: Cha Tae-hyun
493	May 3	Heo Kyung-hwan & Choi Jin-hyuk & Kim Jun-ho, Tony Ahn	Yuk Joong-wan, Lee Beom-soo, Moon Hee-joon & Joon Park & Jang Su-won	Special host: Kangnam
494	May 10	Bae Yoo-ram, Yoon Min-soo & Kim Jun-ho & Tony Ahn	Seo In-guk & Lee Si-eon & Tae Won-seok & Kang Mi-na, Im Byung-ki	Special host: Lee Dong-hwi
495	May 17	Song Hae-na & Han Hye-jin & Tak Jae-hoon & Kim Jun-ho, Yoon Si-yoon & Kim Jong-min & Choi Jin-hyuk, Tony Ahn & Kim Jun-ho	Shin Gyu-jin, Kim Bo-sung & Yeom Seung-hwan	Special host: Jeon So-min
496	May 24	Heo Kyung-hwan, Im Won-hee & Kim Jong-min & Jung Gun-joo & Seo Nam-yong, Im Won-hee & Heo Kyung-hwan	Park Sung-kwang & Park Young-jin & Kim Ji-ho, Shaman Go Chun-ja, Shaman Lee Da-young, Lee Kyu-han	Special host: Lee Se-hee
497	May 31	Choi Jin-hyuk & Heo Kyung-hwan & Tak Jae-hoon, Choi Jin-hyuk & Yoon Si-yoon	Park Joon-geum, Ryu Soo-young	Special host: Jeong Seok-yong
498	June 7	Lyn, Tak Jae-hoon & Kim Jun-ho	Han Da-gam	Special host: Do Ji-won; New daughter Lyn appeared
499	June 14	Han Hye-jin, Kang Ye-won, Cho Jin-se	Shiho Yano & Lee Hye-jung, Choi Min-ho & Chanyeol & Julien Kang	Special host: Han Chae-ah; New daughter Kang Ye-won appeared
500	June 21	Kim Hee-chul & Kim Jun-ho & Kim Jong-min, Kim Seung-soo & Kim Jong-min & Yoon Min-soo, Yoon Hyun-min & Im Won-hee	Park Jung-soo	Special host: So Ji-sub
501	June 28	Lyn, Im Won-hee & Jeong Seok-yong, Seo Nam-yong & Kim Jun-ho & Im Won-hee	Baek Ji-young, Lee Hee-jin	Special host: Yoon Eun-hye
502	July 5	Lyn, Heo Kyung-hwan & Kim Jong-min, Kim Jun-ho & Im Won-hee	K.Will, Heo Seong-beom	Special host: Shin Bong-sun
503	July 12	Kim Hee-chul & Im Won-hee & Seo Nam-yong, Choi Jin-hyuk & Cho Jin-se, Song Jong-ho	Brian Joo, Hwang Seok-jung & Park Se-mi	Special host: Choi Daniel; New daughter Song Jong-ho appeared
504	July 19	Han Hye-jin & Eom Ji-yoon, Lee Dong-gun & Yoon Min-soo & Heo Kyung-hwan, Im Won-hee & Kim Seung-soo & Cho Jin-se	Poongja, Kim Jung-eun & Park Shin-yang, Baek Il-seob	Special host: Lee Da-hae
505	July 26	Lyn & Cho Jin-se, Min Do-hee, Kim Jong-min	Hwang Chi-yeul, Baro & Kim Sung-kyun, Nam Chang-hee & Han Sang-jin	Special host: Park Hyun-bin; New daughter Min Do-hee appeared
506	August 2	Jo Hyun-ah, Heo Kyung-hwan & Yoon Hyun-min	Sung Si-kyung, Shin Bong-sun & Ye Ji-won & Park So-hyun & Yang Jung-a	Special host: Im Soo-hyang
507	August 9	Tak Jae-hoon, Kim Jun-ho, Han Hye-jin	Hwasa, Shin Gyu-jin, Hyun Bong-sik	Special host: Park Kyung-lim
508	August 16	Lyn, Im Won-hee, Kim Seung-soo	Lee Hee-jin, Kim Hyung-mook	Special host: Kim Suk-hoon
509	August 23	Kim Hee-chul & Eun Ji-won, Tak Jae-hoon	Shin Dong-yup & Lee Soo-geun, Ji Ye-eun	Special host: Ji Seok-jin; Celebrating 10 years of Mom's Diary - My Ugly Duckling
510	August 30	Kim Jun-ho & Kim Ji-min, Im Won-hee,	Kim Kwang-kyu & Go Doo-shim, Lee Hyung-chul	Special host: Jung Eun-ji
511	September 6	Tak Jae-hoon, Lyn & Kim Hee-chul, Choi Jin-hyuk	Jung Jun-ho	Special host: Chungha
512	September 13	Lyn	Kim Bum-soo	Special host: Joo Sang-wook
No broadcast on September 20 and September 27 due to the live coverage of the 2026 Asian Games.
513	October 4	Lee Dong-gun & Tak Jae-hoon & Kim Hee-chul & Choi Jin-hyuk, Im Won-hee, Jo Hyun-ah	Lee Hee-jin, Lee Mi-joo	Special host: Jang Yoon-jeong
514	October 11	Kim Seung-soo & Song Jong-ho,		Special host: So Yi-hyun
515	October 18			
