= Kim Bo-sung =

South Korean actor

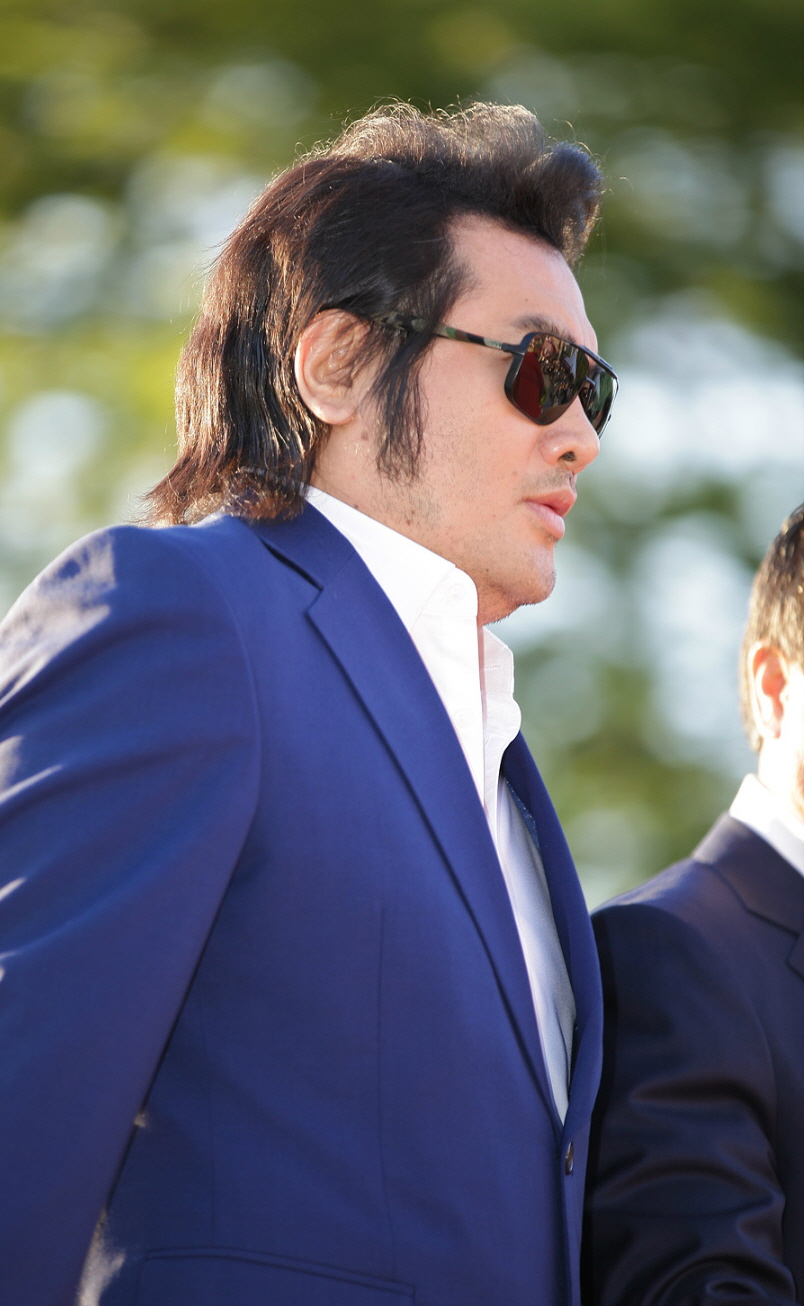
- Kim in 2015
- Born: Heo Seok; June 27, 1966 (age 60); Gangneung, South Korea
- Occupation: Actor
- Years active: 1987–present

Korean name
- Hangul: 허석김보성
- Hanja: 許碩金甫貹
- RR: Heo Seokgimboseong
- MR: Hŏ Sŏkkimbosŏng

Stage name
- Hangul: 김보성
- RR: Gim Boseong
- MR: Kim Posŏng

Former name
- Hangul: 허석
- Hanja: 許碩
- RR: Heo Seok
- MR: Hŏ Sŏk

Heo Seok Kim Bo-sung (born Heo Seok; June 27, 1966) is a South Korean actor.

== Filmography ==
=== Television ===
- Confidence Queen (Prime Video, 2025)
- Sweet Spy (MBC, 2005)
- Guardian Angel (SBS, 2001)
- Aim for Tomorrow (MBC, 1998)
- Sandglass (SBS, 1995)
- West Palace (KBS2, 1995)
- TV City (MBC, 1995)

=== Film ===
- Mr. Zoo: The Missing VIP (2020)
- Analog Human (2016)
- Clementine (2004)
- Come Tomorrow (2003)
- Silver Knife (2003)
- Boss X-File (2002)
- Family (2002)
- Oollala Sisters (2002)
- The Beauty in Dream (2002)
- Gangster Lessons (2000)
- First Kiss (1998)
- Two Cops 3 (1998)
- 1818 (1998)
- The Partner (1998)
- The Rocket is Launched (1998)
- Ghost Mama (1996)
- Two Cops 2 (1996)
- Man with a Gun (1995)
- Two Cops (1993)
- Mister Mamma (1992)
- Bloody fight for Revenge (1992)
- An Unknown White Bird (1992)
- White Badge (1992)
- Teenage Love Song (1991)
- You Know What? It's a Secret 2 (1991)
- Well, Let's Look at the Sky Sometimes (1990)
- Has Nothing to Do with Student Records (1989)
- If You Want (1987)

== Awards and nominations ==
Year	Award	Category	Nominated work	Result	Ref.
1990	Baeksang Arts Awards	Best New Actor	Happiness Does Not Come In Grades	Won	
2014	MTN Broadcast Advertising Festival	Special Award		Won	
2014	The Brand of the Year	Special Award		Won	
2014	Korean Popular Culture and Arts Awards	Minister of Culture, Sports and Tourism's Award		Won	
2014	KCEA Awards	CF Star		Won	
