= Kim Heung-gook =

South Korean singer (born 1959)

- Born: May 18, 1959 (age 67); Seoul, South Korea
- Genre: Pop rock
- Occupations: Singer
- Years active: 1989–present

Korean name
- Hangul: 김흥국
- Hanja: 金興國
- RR: Gim Heungguk
- MR: Kim Hŭngguk

Kim Heung-gook (Korean: 김흥국; born May 18, 1959) is a South Korean singer. He is the chairman of Korea Singers Association. His daughter, Jenny Kim Ju-hyun (김주현; born June 29, 2001, in USA) participated in Idol School in 2017.

== Career ==
Kim was born in Seoul on May 18, 1959. He graduated from Seorabul High School and enlisted in the Marine Corps. He formed a full-fledged rock band, "Daejangseong." He was a drummer and worked mainly as a singer. After Kim left his band, he made his debut in 1985 with the song "Pale Flower Petals" and turned to solo.

After debuting on February 15, 1988, MBC appeared in the role of a young man in the middle of a junior high school girl who was afflicted with a terminal illness in a program called "Human Era - Junga's Winter Diary". I used to sing the song "Jung-ah" in the program to introduce KBS new singer by using that atmosphere. At that time, he impressed viewers with a mustache, but he was only a singer without a hit song.

However, in 1989, he began to work with the song "HORNABI", which was written and composed by Lee Hye-min. It was widely known to the public by introducing a staggering dance that mimicked the appearance of a butterfly on stage. It was the best time to win the 4th Golden Disk Popular Artist Award, the MBC Top 10 Singer Award, and other awards. After 1990, he showed much interest in developing the Dooley dance by showing <Wobbling> and <Scratching>, and he appeared as a guest of MBC arts program "Sunday, Sunday night" that year, I do not know. "He played a big role in broadcasting. On October 30, 1990, when he was in a busy time, he married Yoon Tae-young and had one male and one female. In April, 1991, she appeared as the first guest in MBC entertainment program "Night-Sneaking Camera", which was performed by Lee Kyung-gyu, and gave a lot of laughter to viewers. He was usually a Buddhist, so she was selected as president of the Buddhist singer. Kim Hyeong-guk, who has been active in the broadcasting program since then, made a trot song in 1991 when he announced <Wang Sang-ri> in 1989 and became Kim Hyun-guk's second hit song. In the early '90s, the reggae party, which was produced in 1994 as a subgenre when reggae music such as Doctor Reggae, Joyce Obi, and Lula took on a sensational fashion, did not get much response in the beginning, but gotten considerable popularity afterwards. Particularly comical, he played great in entertainments and was once more a funny singer than a comedian. Kim was awarded the Excellence Prize for the MBC Acting Radio Award in 1996 with his ingenious dedication, and also acted as a radio host. In 1997, MBC Radio "Limited Operation", which was conducted with Park Mi-sun, gained much popularity.

Kim is also known as a representative entertainment enthusiast of the entertainment industry. In 1996, he made 2-2 times for 5 hours to invite Korea to the 2002 World Cup in Seoul. He also made a World Cup host, made a World Cup homepage, Unfolded. On June 26, 2010, when the South Korean soccer team made a promise to cut off a mustache when they made it to the Round of 16 in the South Africa World Cup, when they really advanced to the Round of 16, they promised "I am not a politician" [1] He proceeded with MBC radio "Kim Heung-guk, Kim Kyung-sik's Dusk," from 2010 to 2011, but in June 2011, he was exiled from MBC and held a one-man protest because he supported the Grand National Party's general election in June 2011. [2] After that, he resigned from the board of directors of the agency of the agency and took over as chairman of the Kim Young-guk Scholarship Foundation. Since then, he has actively participated in demonstrations against North Korean refugees in front of the Chinese embassy in Hyoja, on March 8, 2012. [3] Currently, Kim is actively engaged in various fields that are recognized as a comedian rather than a singer for the next generation. Especially, he is called "entertainer chetki" and "

== Ambassadorship ==
- Vice President of the Central Marine Corps Association of the Republic of Korea (2022)

== Filmography ==
- And When The Magnolias Bloom (2024)
- Justice Judgment (2019)
