= Song Haena =

South Korean model (born 1987)

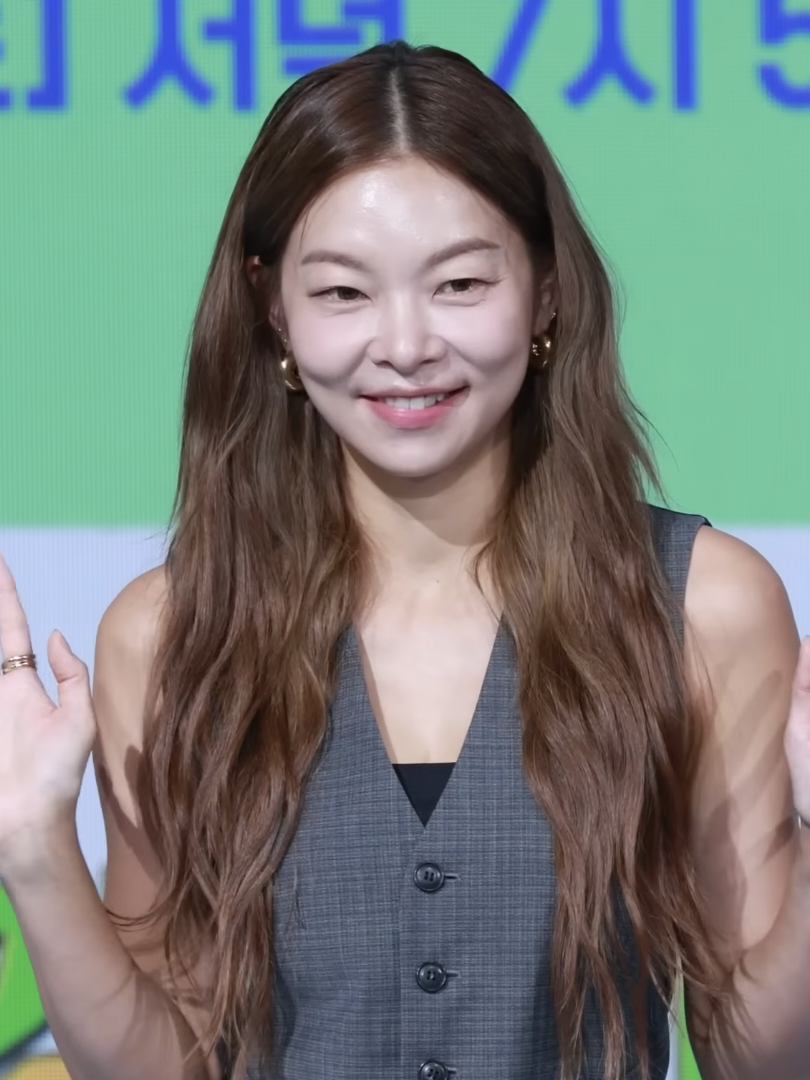
- Song in October 2025
- Born: January 7, 1987 (age 39); Seoul, South Korea
- Occupations: Model, television personality
- Years active: 1987–present
- Height: 1.69 m (5 ft 6 1/2 in)

Korean name
- Hangul: 송해나
- RR: Song Haena
- MR: Song Haena
- Website: Song Haena - X

Song Haena (Korean: 송해나; born January 7, 1987) is a South Korean fashion model and television personality.

== Biography ==
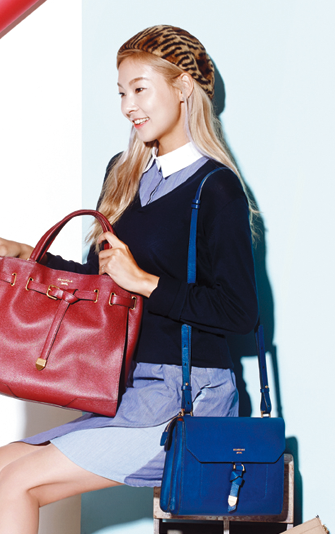
Song for Bean Pole bags in 2014

She began her broadcasting career by appearing as a contestant on Korea's Next Top Model Season 2. At the time of the show's airing, she was already working as a model and showcased a strong presence from the very first shoot. However, she was eliminated in the semifinals, finishing in a tie for third place. After appearing on Korea's Next Top Model Season 2, she signed an exclusive contract with Esteem. In addition to her broadcasting activities, she has also made cameo appearances in dramas and films.
