= Outside Castle =

Studio album by H.O.T.
- Released: September 29, 2000
- Recorded: 2000
- Studios: SM Digital Recording Studios, Seoul
- Genre: K-pop
- Length: 59:15
- Language: Korean
- Label: SM

H.O.T. chronology
I Yah! (1999)	Outside Castle (2000)	H.O.T. Forever 2001 Live Concert (2001)

Alternative cover

Singles from Outside Castle
- 1. "Outside Castle" Released: September 29, 2000; 2. "We Can Do It" Released: September 29, 2000; 3. "A Song For a Lady" Released: September 29, 2000

Outside Castle is the fifth and final studio album by South Korean boy group H.O.T., released on through SM Entertainment on September 29, 2000. The album spawned three singles: the title track "Outside Castle", "We Can Do It", and "A Song For a Lady".

Outside Castle debuted at number one on the MIAK monthly album chart and sold nearly 880,000 copies in 2000, and was the year's fifth best-selling album. The single "Outside Castle" won Best Popular Music Video (Daesang) at the 2000 Mnet Music Video Festival—the group's second consecutive win in the category.

== Background ==
The proportion of self-composed songs, which had been gradually increasing, reached 100% for the album as all of the record's tracks were written or produced by the group members.

== Commercial performance ==
On September 25, 2000, SM Entertainment revealed that the album received over 800,000 pre-orders, with sales expected to surpass ₩3 billion within the month. Released physically on October 2, the album debuted at number one on the monthly MIAK album charts for October with sales of over 840,000 copies. MIAK ranked Outside Castle the fifth best-selling album of 2000 with nearly 880,000 copies sold.

== Accolades ==
Awards and nominations for "Outside Castle"
Award ceremony	Year	Category	Result	Ref.
Mnet Music Video Festival	2000	Best Popular Music Video (Daesang)	Won	
Mnet Music Video Festival	2000	Best Male Group	Nominated	
Mnet Music Video Festival	2000	Best Dance Performance	Nominated	

Music program awards for "Outside Castle"
Program	Date
Inkigayo	October 22, 2000
Inkigayo	October 29, 2000
Inkigayo	November 5, 2000
Music Camp	October 28, 2000
Music Camp	November 4, 2000
Music Camp	November 11, 2000
Music Bank	November 9, 2000
Music Bank	November 16, 2000
Music Bank	November 23, 2000

== Promotion and live performances ==
=== 2001 H.O.T. Live Concert ===
H.O.T. held their second concert at the Jamsil Olympic Stadium titled the "2001 H.O.T. Live Concert – H.O.T. Forever". The concert took place on February 27, 2001, and attracted 45,000 fans. A live album recording of the concert was released on April 27, 2001, which sold 138,616 copies.

Setlist

1. "I Yah!"
2. "Git It Up!" / "You Got Gun"
3. Opening Ment
4. "It's Been Raining Since You Left Me" / "Delight"
5. "N.B.K. (Natural Born Killer)"
6. "Time Will Tell"
7. "Livin' La Vida Loca" (Tony solo)
8. "Only You" (Kangta solo)
9. "Right Here Waiting" (Kangta solo)
10. "Full of Happiness" (with fan) (Kangta solo)
11. "Let It Be" (Kangta solo)
12. "Persia Black Hole ((Moon Hee-joon solo)
13. "A Song For a Lady"
14. "We Are the Future" / "OP.T (Operation Takeover)"
15. "Scratch Show" (Woohyuk solo)
16. "Good-bye For the Last" (with Tony) (Woohyuk solo)
17. "Full of Happiness" / "Hope"
18. "My Mother"
19. Closing Ment
20. "You & I"
21. "We Can Do It"
22. "Outside Castle"

== Track listing ==
Outside Castle track listing
No.	Title	Lyrics	Music	Arrangement	Length
1.	"Outside Castle"	Moon Hee-joon	Moon Hee-joon	Moon Hee-joon; Park In-young	5:23
2.	"Delight" (신비; Sinbi)	Kangta	Kangta	Kangta	3:51
3.	"We Can Do It!" (그래! 그렇게!; Geulae! Geuleohge!)	Kangta	Kangta	Kangta	4:05
4.	"My Mother"	Jang Woo-hyuk	Jang Woo-hyuk; Kangta	Jang Woo-hyuk; Song Gwang-sik; Oh Jo-hwan	3:49
5.	"Pray for You" (꿈의 기도; Kkum-ui gido)	Kangta	Kangta	Kangta	4:47
6.	"Wish of a Blue Bird" (파랑새의 소원; Palangsaeui sowon)	Moon Hee-joon	Moon Hee-joon	Moon Hee-joon	3:35
7.	"Time Will Tell"	Lee Jae-won; Moon Hee-joon	Lee Jae-won; Moon Hee-joon	Lee Jae-won	4:21
8.	"One Last Love"	Tony Ahn	Tony Ahn; Yoon Chi-woong	Tony Ahn; Yoon Chi-woong	3:35
9.	"Good-bye for the Last" (Goodbye 이젠; Goodbye Ijen; lit. 'Goodbye For Now')	Jang Woo-hyuk	Jang Woo-hyuk; Kangta	Jang Woo-hyuk	4:16
10.	"A Song For Lady" (연가)	Moon Hee-joon	Moon Hee-joon	Moon Hee-joon; Park In-young	4:20
11.	"Illusion"	Kangta	Kangta	Kangta	4:44
12.	"Natural Born Killer"	Tony Ahn	Tony Ahn	Tony Ahn; Oh Jo-hwan	3:43
13.	"Abandoned Children" (버려진 아이들; Beolyeojin aideul)	Lee Jae-won	Lee Jae-won	Lee Jae-won	4:46
14.	"Always My Love" (늘 지금처럼; Neul jigeumcheoleom)	Kangta	Kangta	Kangta	4:00
Total length:					59:15

== Credits and personnel ==
Credits are adapted from the album's booklet.

H.O.T.

- Moon Hee-joon – vocals, rap, digital editing (tracks 1, 6, 10), piano (1), sampling (1, 6), chorus (1, 4, 6, 9, 12), backing vocals (2–3, 5, 11, 14), mixing (1, 6, 10)
- Kangta – lead vocals, computer programming (tracks 2–3, 5, 11, 14), backing vocals (2–3, 5, 11, 14), chorus (4, 6, 8–9, 12)
- Tony Ahn – vocals, rap, backing vocals (tracks 2–3, 5, 11, 14), chorus (4, 9, 12), digital editing (8, 12)
- Jang Woo-hyuk – rap, backing vocals (tracks 2–3, 5, 11, 14), digital editing (4, 9), chorus (4, 9, 12)
- Lee Jae-won – rap, backing vocals (tracks 2–3, 5, 11, 14), chorus (4, 9, 12), digital editing (7, 13)

Session

- Song Gwang-sik – piano (tracks 1, 4, 9, 14)
- Groovie K – other (tracks 1, 7, 9, 10, 12, 13)
- Park In-young – string arrangement (tracks 1, 10)
- Kim Jin-mi and 23 others – string music (track 1)
- Oh Yo-hwan, Oh Jo-hwan and 8 others – string music (tracks 2, 5, 14)
- Oh Yo-hwan, Oh Jo-hwan – string music (tracks 4, 9, 12)
- Gary Chung – other (tracks 3–5, 8, 9, 11, 14)
- Lee Tae-yun – bass guitar (tracks 4–6, 9, 10, 12–14)
- Lee Jeong-sik – saxophone (tracks 4, 6)
- Little Peace Children's Choir – chorus (track 6)
- Yoon Chi-woong – digital editing (track 8)
- DJ Murf – scratch (track 9)
- Suho Kang – drums (tracks 10, 12, 14)
- Hunihoon – rap lyricist (track 13)

Staff

- Lee Soo-man, H.O.T. – producers
- Yeo Doo-hyun – mixing (tracks 1, 6, 7, 13), recording
- KAT – mixing (10), recording
- Jeon Hoon (Sonic Korea) – mastering
- Kim Kyung-wook – production
- Hong Hyun-jong, Park Won-young – promotion
- Kim Ki-beom, Cheon Kang-soo, Kim Yeon-jeong, Lee Kyung-min – promotional assistants
- Seong Moon-seok, Choi Mi-sook, Kim Eun-ah, Lee Sang-hee, Kim Ji-hyun, Sunwoo Yun-jae – stylists
- Hyeong Bae-hyung – album design
- Jo Se-hyun – photography
- Myungjin Art – printing
- SM Entertainment – executive producer

== Charts ==
=== Monthly charts ===
Chart (2000)	Peak position
South Korean Albums (MIAK)	1

=== Year-end charts ===
Chart (2000)	Peak position
South Korean Albums (MIAK)	5

=== Sales ===
Chart	Amount
South Korea (MIAK)	879,613
