= We Hate All Kinds of Violence =

We Hate All Kinds of Violence...

Studio album by H.O.T.
- Released: September 7, 1996
- Recorded: 1996
- Studio: SM Studios, Seoul
- Genre: K-pop; dance-pop
- Length: 36:05
- Language: Korean
- Label: SM
- Producer: Yoo Young-jin; Jang Yong-jin; Kwak Sang-yeop; Kim Joo-hyun

H.O.T. chronology
We Hate All Kinds of Violence... (1996)	Wolf and Sheep (1997)

Singles from Wolf and Sheep
- 1. "Warrior's Descendant" Released: September 7, 1996; 2. "Candy" Released: September 7, 1996

We Hate All Kinds of Violence... is the debut studio album by South Korean boy group H.O.T., released through SM Entertainment on September 7, 1996. Two singles were promoted off of the record—"Warrior's Descendant" and "Candy". It experienced commercially success upon its release with sales of over 1,500,000 copies, held the record as the best-selling album by an SM Entertainment artists for 24 years until the record was broken in 2020 by NCT's second studio album NCT 2020 Resonance Pt.1.

== Background ==
In early 1996, SM Entertainment founder and record producer Lee Soo-man surveyed high school students in the area to find out what their ideal pop music group would be like. Lee then used this information to form and create the concept of the agency's upcoming boy group, H.O.T. Five members—Moon Hee-joon, Jang Woo-hyuk, Tony An, Kangta and Lee Jae-won were recruited by the company and soon became trainees under the agency, a model that took inspiration from the idol system in Japan. The group made their debut with We Hate All Kinds of Violence on September 7, 1996.

Two singles were spawned from the album with accompanying music videos: the first single "Warrior's Descendant" is a critique of schoolyard bullying, while the second single, "Candy", is a cheerful bubblegum pop song that established the group's popularity in South Korea.

== Composition and themes ==
Wi Su-ji of IZM wrote how the composition of the record's tracks caters to the needs of teenagers. The first track, "Candy", which was decided as a follow-up song after "Warrior's Descendant", contains lyrics about a love story with teenagers being able to relate to the lyrics in some way. In the rap part of "Warrior's Descendant", the group declares the opposition of all forms of violence; Yoo Young-jin who composed the track revealed that school violence, which was a big social problem at the time, inspired the artwork for the album's cover. At the time, the song was noted by critics for openly exposing problems of reality among the youth. The lyrics of the track "X Generation" revolve around the theme of emphasizing individuality rather than simply following trends.

== Reception ==
=== Commercial performance ===
Upon its release, We Hate All Kinds of Violence was met with commercial success in South Korea, selling over 1.5 million copies and became one of the best-selling albums in the country. "Candy" topped the domestic music program rankings for multiple weeks.

=== Legacy ===
"In the 1990s, if you were to pick an event that marked a milestone in the history of Korean popular music, it would be the debut of Seo Taiji and Boys as well as the debut of [H.O.T.], who dominated the industry after their retirement. The exact date is September 7, 1996. After H.O.T. debuted, they marked the beginning of the first generation of idols, that is, the beginning of the Korean idol era." — IZM, October 2012

Pop culture commentators have regarded We Hate All Kinds of Violence for its role in ushering the modern idol system in K-pop. The trainee system laid by SM Entertainment with H.O.T. led them to become considered as the first idol group in South Korea; the fashion, rap skills and dance moves shown through its songs such as "Candy" sparked a new wave of mainstream music in the country.

== In popular culture ==
The 2012 drama Reply 1997 revolves around the main character (played by Jung Eun-ji) idolizing H.O.T along with her friends in 1997, with one scene showing the characters attending a performance of "Warrior's Descendant". The show's popularity sparked a "retro" trend in South Korea with the media and cultural commentators noting an increased interest in 1990s pop culture following the drama's release.

== Tracklist ==
We Hate All Kinds of Violence track listing
No.	Title	Lyrics	Music	Length
1.	"Candy"	Jang Yong-jin	Jang Yong-jin	3:37
2.	"As Much As I Love You" (널 사랑한 만큼)	Kwak Sang-yeop	Kwak Sang-yeop	4:00
3.	"Warrior's Descendant" (전사의 후예 (폭력시대))	Yoo Young-jin	Yoo Young-jin	4:24
4.	"You Belong to Me" (노을 속에 비친 그대 모습)	Kang Jun-shik	Kim Joo-hyun	3:45
5.	"By Your Side" (내가 필요할 때 (소년, 소녀 가장에게))	Yoo Young-jin	Yoo Young-jin	4:33
6.	"The Cranky Day" (오늘도 짜증나는 날이네)	Kim Joo-hyun	Kim Joo-hyun	3:53
7.	"First Love" (너는 Fast 나는 Slow)	Yoo Young-jin	Yoo Young-jin	3:39
8.	"X Generation" (개성시대)	Kang Jun-shik	Kim Joo-hyun	4:48
9.	"About Women" (About 여자)	Kang Jun-shik	Kim Joo-hyun	3:26
Total length:				36:05

== Credits and personnel ==
- H.O.T.
  - Kangta – lead vocals, chorus
  - Jang Woo-hyuk – rap, chorus
  - Tony Ahn – rap, English rap, vocals, chorus
  - Lee Jae-won – rap, chorus
  - Moon Hee-joon – rap, vocals, chorus
- Lee Tae-yoon – bass guitar (track 3)
- Son Jin-tae (tracks 3, 5)
- Kim Joo-hyun – others (tracks 4, 6, 8, 9)
- Lee Soo-man – executive producer
- Yoo Young-jin – director, chorus
- KAT (Heo Jeong-hee) – mixing, recording, chorus
- Jung Young-doo – recording, assistive technology
- R&C Communications – design
- Jung Hae-chan – illustrator
- Ko Kyung-min – coordinator
- Lee Ji-min – coordinator
- Jung Hae-ik – production
- Kim Kyung-wook – production

== Release history ==
Release history for We Hate All Kinds of Violence
Region	Date	Formats	Label	Ref.
South Korea	September 7, 1996	CD; cassette	SM Entertainment, Seorabul Records	
South Korea	1997	CD; cassette	SM Entertainment, Synnara Music	
Japan	October 24, 2001	CD	SM Entertainment, Avex Trax	

== See also ==
- List of best-selling albums in South Korea
