= Resurrection (H.O.T. album) =

- Digital cover

Studio album by H.O.T.
- Released: September 25, 1998
- Recorded: 1997–1998
- Studio: SM Digital Recording Studios, Seoul
- Genre: K-pop
- Length: 30:37
- Language: Korean
- Label: SM

H.O.T. chronology
| Wolf and Sheep (1997) | Resurrection (1998) | I Yah! (1999) |

Singles from Resurrection
- 1. "Line Up!" Released: September 25, 1998; 2. "Hope" Released: September 25, 1998

Resurrection is the third Korean studio album by South Korean boy group H.O.T., released on September 25, 1998, through SM Entertainment. The album produced two singles that were promoted with music videos and live performances on music programs in South Korea: "Line Up!" and "Hope".

The album was commercially successful, selling over 1.1 million copies by 1999. "Line Up!" won the International Viewer's Choice Award for MTV Korea at the 1999 MTV Video Music Awards and "Hope" won the Grand Prize (Daesang) at the KBS Music Awards.

== Background ==
The members of the group began to self-compose songs for this record, with lyrics containing themes of criticisms of society, such as suicide and abortion.

== Covers ==
"Hope" has been covered many times and has been routinely covered by all SM Entertainment artists at the end of SM Town concerts. Other instances include on September 17, 2011, when Super Junior and Girls' Generation performed a cover of "Hope". At the 2018 MBC Gayo Daejejeon, the show ended with all performers singing a cover of the song. AB6IX performed a cover of "Hope" on the 1000th Music Bank episode special on October 18, 2019. On December 16, 2022, Le Sserafim covered it at the 2022 KBS Song Festival.

== Accolades ==
"Hope" won the Grand Prize (Daesang) at the 1998 KBS Music Awards and Best Popular Song at the 1998 MBC Music Festival. "Line Up!" was voted the International Viewer's Choice for MTV Korea at the 1999 MTV Video Music Awards, winning with 38% of the vote.

Awards and nominations
| Award ceremony | Year | Category | Nominee | Result | Ref. |
|---|---|---|---|---|---|
| Golden Disc Awards | 1998 | Album of the Year (Daesang) | Resurrection | Nominated | |
| Golden Disc Awards | 1998 | Main Prize (Bonsang) | Resurrection | Won | |
| KBS Music Awards | 1998 | Grand Prize (Daesang) | "Hope" | Won | |
| MBC Music Festival | 1998 | Best Popular Song | "Hope" | Won | |
| MTV Video Music Awards | 1999 | International Viewer's Choice – MTV Korea | "Line Up!" | Won | |

Music program awards
| Song | Program | Date |
|---|---|---|
| "Line Up!" | Music Camp | October 10, 1998 |
| "Line Up!" | Music Camp | October 17, 1998 |
| "Line Up!" | Music Camp | October 24, 1998 |
| "Line Up!" | Inkigayo | October 18, 1998 |
| "Line Up!" | Inkigayo | November 8, 1998 |
| "Hope" | Music Bank | November 17, 1998 |
| "Hope" | Music Bank | December 1, 1998 |
| "Hope" | Music Bank | December 15, 1998 |
| "Hope" | Music Camp | November 21, 1998 |
| "Hope" | Music Camp | November 28, 1998 |
| "Hope" | Music Camp | December 12, 1998 |
| "Hope" | Inkigayo | November 29, 1998 |
| "Hope" | Inkigayo | December 6, 1998 |
| "Hope" | Inkigayo | December 13, 1998 |

== Promotion ==
H.O.T. embarked on their second South Korean concert tour, titled H.O.T. The 2nd Concert, in Seoul on January 22, 1999. The group held 12 shows at the Sejong Center in Seoul during the tour: one show a day on January 22–23 and two shows a day from January 24–28. All 35,500 tickets for the initial 10 shows in Seoul were sold out in 26 minutes, therefore two more shows were added for January 28.

=== H.O.T. The 2nd Concert ===
Concert dates
| Date | City | Country | Venue | Attendance |
|---|---|---|---|---|
| January 22, 1999 | Seoul | South Korea | Sejong Center | 42,600 |
| January 23, 1999 | Seoul | South Korea | Sejong Center | 42,600 |
| January 24, 1999 (Two shows) | Seoul | South Korea | Sejong Center | 42,600 |
| January 25, 1999 (Two shows) | Seoul | South Korea | Sejong Center | 42,600 |
| January 26, 1999 (Two shows) | Seoul | South Korea | Sejong Center | 42,600 |
| January 27, 1999 (Two shows) | Seoul | South Korea | Sejong Center | 42,600 |
| January 28, 1999 (Two shows) | Seoul | South Korea | Sejong Center | 42,600 |
| January 31, 1999 | Busan | South Korea | Sajik Arena | 11,000 |
| February 3, 1999 | Gwangju | South Korea | Yeomju Gymnasium | 10,000 |
| Total | | | | 64,000 |

== Track listing ==
Resurrection track listing
| No. | Title | Lyrics | Music | Arrangement | Length |
|---|---|---|---|---|---|
| 1. | "Hope" (빛; Bit; lit. Light) | Kangta | Kangta | Kangta | 4:20 |
| 2. | "Line Up!" (열맞춰!; Yeolmajchwo!; lit. Get Excited!) | Yoo Young-jin | Yoo Young-jin; Groovie K | Yoo Young-jin | 4:10 |
| 3. | "The Spirit of Fighter" (투혼; Tuhon) | Moon Hee-joon | Moon Hee-joon | Moon Hee-joon | 4:09 |
| 4. | "The Promise of H.O.T." (우리들의 맹세; Ulideul-ui maengse; lit. Our Oath) | Yoo Young-jin; Kangta | Yoo Young-jin | Yoo Young-jin | 4:23 |
| 5. | "H.O.T. (House of Trust)" | Jang Yong-jin | Jang Yong-jin | Jang Yong-jin | 3:15 |
| 6. | "In I" (이 세상에 버려진 모든 아이들을 위하여...; I sesange beolyeojin modeun aideuleul wihayeo; lit. For all the children abandoned in this world) | Moon Hee-joon | Moon Hee-joon | Moon Hee-joon | 5:20 |
| 7. | "Monade" | Kwak Sang-yeop | Kwak Sang-yeop | Kwak Sang-yeop | 4:18 |
| 8. | "Techno Love" | Kangta | Kangta | Kangta | 3:57 |
| 9. | "You Got Gun?" | Lee Jae-won | Lee Jae-won | Lee Jae-won | 4:15 |
| 10. | "Boys, Be a Legend" (소년이여! 신화가 되어라; Sonyeoniyeo! Sinhwaga doeeola) | Jang Woo-hyuk | Jang Woo-hyuk | Jang Woo-hyuk | 4:11 |
| 11. | "All Alone" (홀로서기; Holloseogi) | Tony Ahn | Tony Ahn | Tony Ahn | 3:48 |
| 12. | "Since You've Gone" (후에...; Hue...) | Moon Hee-joon | Moon Hee-joon | Moon Hee-joon | 4:14 |
| 13. | "Unity Is as Beautiful as One" (하나라는 아름다운 느낌; Holloseogi) | Tony Ahn | Tony Ahn | Tony Ahn | 4:08 |
| 14. | "Wedding X-mas" (Bonus track) | Kangta | Kangta | Kangta | 4:46 |

== Charts ==
=== Monthly charts ===
| Chart (1998) | Peak position |
|---|---|
| South Korean Albums (MIAK) | 1 |

=== Sales ===
| Chart | Amount |
|---|---|
| South Korea (MIAK) | 1,103,439 |
