= Deux (band) =

South Korean musical duo (1993–1995)

- Lee Hyun-do and Kim Sung-jae

Background information
- Origin: South Korea
- Genres: K-pop; new jack swing; hip-hop
- Years active: 1993–1995; 2025–present
- Labels: Jigu Records; Yedang; WA:ID Company
- Members: Lee Hyun-do (Note: As of 2025, both members are represented through the use of generative AI.); Kim Sung-jae

Deux (Korean: 듀스) is a South Korean virtual band managed by WA:ID Company. The group was originally a K-pop duo from the early 1990s consisting of Lee Hyun-do and Kim Sung-jae, who were among the first to incorporate hip-hop into Korean music.

== History ==
=== 1993–1995: Debut as a hip hop duo and Kim Sungjae's death ===
Lee Hyun-do and Kim Sung-jae first met in high school, when a friend of Lee's introduced the two together. Before Deux were formed, Lee and Kim started their careers as members of Wawa, the dance team of singer Hyun Jin-young. The previous members Kang Won-rae and Koo Jun-yup, who were to enlist in the military, suggested Hyun take in Kim Sung-jae, who later brought in Lee Hyun-do. Lee and Kim separated from Hyun Jin-young's dance team to form Deux, and on 23 April 1993, Deux made their official debut. Their first album was fully produced by Lee Hyun-do.

At the beginning of 1994, the group released their second album, Deuxism, its lead single the song "We Are". The album sold 300,000 copies a month and a half after its release, and "We Are" topped the charts of the SBS music program TV Gayo 20 for five consecutive weeks. Deux's next album, Rhythm Light Beat Black, included both remixes of their old work and new songs. At the end of 1994, Deux won the SCK Popularity Award at the Golden Disc Awards (then named the Korea Visual and Records Grand Prize Award).

Force Deux, the group's third studio album, was released in April 1995. Seeing over a million pre-orders, the album accumulated 900,000 sales a month and a half after its release. The lead track, "Break Off the Yoke", charted high on the three major Korean broadcasters' (KBS, MBC, and SBS) music programs, almost winning to Roo'ra's "Angel Without Wings" on SBS's TV Gayo 20.

On 7 June 1995, Deux held a press conference announcing their disbandment, citing health issues caused by their busy schedules. The group stated that they would hold a free "goodbye concert" from 7—8 July, and after a TV Gayo 20 performance on 17 July would completely split up. In November, Kim Sung-jae released his debut solo album, but he was found dead on 20 November, a day after his first performance. Lee Hyun-do announced his retirement following Kim's death, but returned with a solo album in 1996. The next year, a greatest hits album called Deux Forever was released, which included an unreleased track called "Love, Fear". The song was originally meant for Kim Sung-jae's second solo album; Lee Hyun-do made it a duet by adding his own vocals to the track.

=== 2025–present: Return as a virtual band and 4th Deux ===
On November 19, 2025, it was announced that a new Deux single, titled "Rise", would be released on the 27th, with Kim Sung-jae's voice being recreated using AI. It will be the first single from the group's upcoming fourth full length album, releasing in early 2026. The second single from the album, "Another Day", was released on April 18, 2026. At a pre-listening party for the album on November 7th, it was revealed that the group's fourth album, 4th Deux, would be released on November 21, 2026.

== Musical style and legacy ==
Deux's music is influenced by various kinds of black music, including hip hop, R&B, and new jack swing. Lee Hyun-do produced most of their output, while Kim Sung-jae took charge of the choreography and fashion. Along with groups like Seo Taiji and Boys and Noise, they were part of the "rap-dance" trend of the early 1990s. Kim Seong-hwan of the Korean Popular Music Institute wrote, "Their intense choreography, which was more faithful to B-boying than other dance groups, and their music, which was closer to overseas black music trends, clearly differentiated them from Seo Taiji and Boys and Hyun Jin-young." Their lyrics, also written mostly by Lee Hyun-do, often focused on love and self-reflection.

Deux has been credited as one of the key groups that popularized black music in South Korea and a major factor in the development of Korean hip-hop; music critic Han Dong-yoon wrote in a Jugan Kyunghyang article that after Deux, "Korean hip-hop and dance music began to show rapid growth". They are said to be the first artists in the country to release a song consisting purely of rapping, with the track "Untitled". Fashion items worn by the group, including sunglasses and bags, also trended amongst young people; in a survey of 500 high schoolers conducted by Kia Group in 1994, Deux were named as one of the artists whose fashion the youth imitated most.

In 2013, Mnet included Deux on their Legend 100 Artists list. Deuxism and Force Deux ranked 81st and 35th place respectively on Kyunghyang Shinmun's Top 100 Korean Popular Music Albums list. The group's debut song, "Turn Around and Look at Me", was one of the 100 best songs in Korean pop music history by Rolling Stone magazine. For the group's 20th anniversary in 2013, a tribute album project went underway, on which musicians like Brave Brothers, Shinsadong Tiger, and Muzie participated.

== Discography ==
=== Studio albums ===
Title	Album details	Tracks
Deux	Released: 23 April 1993; Label: Jigu Records; Format: CD, cassette	1. "Deux Theme" (Intro); 2. "Look Back at Me" (나를 돌아봐); 3. "I Knew It" (알고 있었어); 4. "My Stupid Story" (나의 바보같은 이야기); 5. "Every Day Always Always" (매일 항상 언제나); 6. "In the world... you" (세상속에서...... 그댄); 7. "Now" (이제); 8. "Look Back at Me" (Inst.) (나를 돌아봐 (Inst.))
Deuxism	Released: 30 December 1993; Label: Jigu Records; Format: CD, cassette	1. "Here We Come!" (Intro); 2. "It's You Again" (그대 지금 다시); 3. "Untitled" (무제); 4. "In the Rain" (빗속에서); 5. "Go! Go! Go!" (feat. H2O); 6. "It's Hard" (힘들어); 7. "Individuality" (개성); 8. "Then" (그 때); 9. "Weak Man" (약한남자); 10. "Another Sorrow" (또 하나의 슬픔); 11. "We Are" (우리는); 12. "Only for You"; 13. "I" (Prelude) (난 (Prelude))
Force Deux	Released: 13 April 1995; Label: Yedang Records, World Music Co.; Format: CD, cassette	1. "Force Deux" - Intro; 2. "Break Off the Yoke" - Mo Funk Version (굴레를 벗어나 - Mo Funk version); 3. "After the Quarrel" (다투고 난 뒤); 4. "Wound" (상처); 5. "Confused Consciousness" (의식혼란); 6. "Nothing But a Party"; 7. "Only for You" (너에거만); 8. "Wake Up with a Smile" (이제 웃으며 일어나); 9. "Message"; 10. "In the Mood"; 11. "Rumination" (반추); 12. "To the One I Love" (사랑하는 이에게); 13. "Break Off the Yoke" - Ruff Tuff Version (굴레를 벗어나 - Ruff Tuff Version); 14. "Outro" - outro
4th Deux	Release date: 21 November 2026; Label: WA:ID Company; Format: CD, digital download, streaming	

=== Other albums ===
Title	Album details	Tracks
Rhythm Light Beat Black	Released: 9 September 1994; Label: Jigu Records; Format: CD, cassette	1. "In the Summer" (여름 안에서); 2. "Weak Man" - mo'rhythm Version (약한 남자 - mo'rhythm version); 3. "Untitled" - Hard Core Version (무제 - Hard Core Version); 4. "I Knew It" - Song Version (알고 있었어 - Song Version); 5. "Time to Wreck" (with ness) (feat. Ness); 6. "We Are" - Power Up Version (우리는 - Power Up Version); 7. "Another Sorrow" - Instrumental (또 하나의 슬픔 - Instrumental); 8. "Go Away!" (떠나버려!); 9. "Weak Man" - Wow Wow Version (약한남자 - Wow Wow Version); 10. "Song of Eternity" (영원의 노래); 11. "Look Back at Me" (나를 돌아봐); 12. "To My Hero" (영웅에게); 13. "Go! Go! Go!" (with H20) - 2 Heavy Version; 14. "We Are" - Club mix Version (우리는 - Club mix Version)
Live 199507121617	Released: 15 July 1995; Label: Yedang Records; Format: CD, cassette	1. "We Are the Deux" - Live Version; 2. "Break Off the Yoke" - Mo' Funk Version (굴레를 벗어나 - Mo' Funk Version); 3. "Weak Man" - Live Version (약한남자 - Live Version); 4. "I Knew It" - Live Version (알고 있었어 - Live Version); 5. "We Are" - Live Version (우리는 - Live Version); 6. "Confused Consciousness" - Live Version (의식혼란 - Live Version); 7. "In the Summer" - Live Version (여름 안에서 - Live Version); 8. "It's Hard" - Kim Sungjae Solo Version (힘들어 - Kim Sungjae Solo Version); 9. "Another Sorrow" - Lee Hyundo Solo Version (또 하나의 슬픔 - Lee Hyundo Solo Version); 10. "Go! Go! Go!" - Live Version; 11. "After the Quarrel" - Live Version (다투고 난 뒤 - Live Version); 12. "Look Back at Me" - Live Version (나를 돌아봐 - Live Version); 13. "Wound" - Live Version (상처 - Live Version); 14. "Wake Up, With a Smile" - Live Version (이제, 웃으며 일어나 - Live Version); 15. "Message" - Live Version; 16. "Break Off the Yoke" - Tuff Ruff Live Version (굴레를 벗어나 - Tuff Ruff Version); 17. "To the One I Love" - Live Version (사랑하는 이에게 - Live Version)

=== Singles ===
Title	Year	Album
"Rise"	2025	4th Deux
"Another Day"	2026	4th Deux
"The Future"	2026	4th Deux

== Awards and nominations ==
Year	Award-Giving Body	Category	Work	Result
2004	Mnet Km Music Video Festival	Mnet PD's Choice Award	Deux	Won
