= DJ Koo =

DJ Koo may refer to:

- DJ Koo (South Korean musician)
- DJ Koo (Japanese musician)
