= Hyun Jin-young =

South Korean singer (born 1971)

Hyun Jin-young 현진영
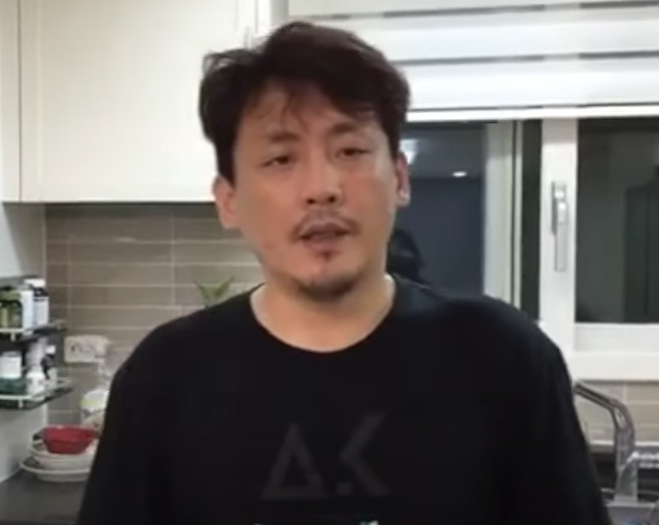
- Hyun in 2021

Background information
- Born: Heo Hyeon-seok; February 3, 1971 (age 55); Seoul, South Korea
- Genres: Hip-hop; K-pop; jazz
- Occupations: Singer; dancer
- Years active: 1990–present
- Labels: S.M. Studio; SidusHQ; Fun Han Entertainment
- Formerly of: Hyun Jin-young and Wawa; I.W.B.H
- Spouse: Oh Seo-un (m. 2011)

Korean name
- Hangul: 허현석
- RR: Heo Hyeonseok
- MR: Hŏ Hyŏnsŏk

Stage name
- Hangul: 현진영
- RR: Hyeon Jinyeong
- MR: Hyŏn Chinyŏng

Heo Hyeon-seok (Korean: 허현석; born February 3, 1971), better known by his stage name Hyun Jin-young (현진영), is a South Korean singer and dancer. He is best known for his role in introducing hip-hop music to South Korea.

Hyun is known as the first artist to be signed to SM Entertainment, then operating as S.M. Studio, in 1989. In 1995, his contract was completed and he left SM.

== Early life ==
Hyun has been involved with music since he was a child; his father Ho Byong Chan, was a jazz pianist who was the first person to create a Jazz big band called AAA (Triple A) inside the 8th US army village. While growing up in Hannam-dong UN Village (8th US Army Village near the U.S. Army Base), he was introduced to African-American music by American friends. He learned how to sing, dance and rap throughout his childhood. At the age of 14 in Korean age, he was noticed and recruited by the dance crew "Spark", which was considered as the first Korean break dance group. He dropped out of high school at age 16 to become a hip-hop musician.

== Career ==
He eventually met Lee Soo-man, and Hyun passed Lee's audition since he pulled off the toggichum (토끼춤, "The Roger Rabbit"). He then trained under Lee's supervision to prepare for his debut.

=== Hyun Jin-young and Wawa ===
Debuting as Hyun Jin-young and Wawa in 1990, Hyun released hit songs such as "Sad Mannequin" (슬픈 마네킹), "Sexy Lady" (야한여자) and "You Are in My Unclear Memory" (흐린기억속의그대). Though album sales were mediocre, he gained popularity as a forerunner of hip hop music in South Korea, which at the time was a shock for most audiences. At first, Wawa consisted of Koo Jun-yup and Kang Won-rae from Clon, later Lee Hyun-do and Kim Sung-jae, both of Deux fame, and finally Sean, a future half of Jinusean. Hyun's career was damaged by a series of drug convictions from which it never fully recovered. He was incarcerated for marijuana use in 1991, then methamphetamines in 1993. Hyun later said he became addicted to methamphetamines after befriending a drug dealer inmate during his first stint in jail. Further arrests followed in 1995 and 1998. In 1997, he formed a hip hop duo named I.W.B.H. with Lee Tak.

=== Return ===
In 2001, Hyun returned to the music scene with his fourth solo album, Wild Gangster Hip Hop-21C Hyun Jinyoung Vol.IV. The response from his fans was favorable. He checked himself into hospital in 2003 and underwent a drug rehabilitation program. In 2006, he released his fifth album called Street Jazz In My Soul. This album contained jazz music, a departure from his exclusively hip-hop origins. The following year, he began teaching at RAUM, a professional music academy in Gangnam.

He was also a chief producer of SidusHQ.

== Personal life ==
Hyun legally married actress and entrepreneur Oh Seo-un in June 2011. Their wedding ceremony was postponed and took place in 2013.

== Discography ==
=== Studio albums ===
Title	Album details
New Dance 1 (as Hyun Jin-young and Wawa)	Released: April 1, 1990; Label: S.M. Studio; Format: LP; Track listing: 1. "슬픈 마네킹" (4:04); 2. "eye shadow" (4:11); 3. "야한여자 (rap version)" (4:26) (Note: Contains uncredited rap performed by Damon Williams, who was formerly part of the United states army.); 4. "사랑찾기" (4:29); 5. "슬픈 마네킹(instrumental version)" (3:33); 6. "비틀거리는 세상" (4:14); 7. "꿈이었나봐" (3:59); 8. "야한여자" (4:29); 9. "추억 그리고 아픔" (4:02); 10. "여행" (3:58)
New Dance 2	Released: August 1, 1992; Label: S.M. Studio; Format: CD, cassette; Track listing: 1. Intro; 2. 흐린 기억속의 그대 (Club Mix); 3. 너에게만; 4. 너는 왜 (현진영 Go 진영 Go); 5. 봄비; 6. 한동안 뜸했었지; 7. 미인 (Note: Originally sung by Shin Jung Hyun); 8. 비틀거리는 세상 (Remix); 9. 난 깜짝 놀랄 짓을 할거야; 10. 떠나가지마; 11. 흐린 기억속의 그대 (Original); 12. 흐린 기억속의 그대 (Inst.)
Int. World Beat and Hiphop Of New Dance 3	Released: September 1, 1993; Label: S.M. Studio; Format: CD, cassette; Track listing: 1. 두근 두근 쿵쿵; 2. 12번째 사랑; 3. 나만의 그녀; 4. 남자라 부르는 내 모습; 5. 바로 너!; 6. Always And Forever (너만을); 7. 내 눈빛 속에 너 8. 현진영 Go 진영 Go (Melody Remake); 9. 너만을 (English Ver.); 10. 두근 두근 쿵쿵 (inst); 11. 바로 너! (inst)
Wild Gangster Hiphop 21C Hyun Jinyoung Vol.IV	Released: January 1, 2002; Label: King Entertainment(currently listed as RIAK); Format: CD, cassette; Track listing: 1. Intro; 2. 용쟁호투; 3. 요람 (Note: Originally song by his hiphop group IWBH); 4. 어둠의 나날들(Dark days); 5. 엽기적인 세상; 6. 보랏빛 계단; 7. 니가 된 나 8. No!; 9. 남과 다르게; 10. Pray; 11. 같은 하늘 아래 그 후... (Note: Originally song by his hiphop group IWBH); 12. 어둠의 나날들(Dark days)(Techno Ver.); 13. 현진영 Go 진영 Go 21 Century; 14. 용쟁호투(Club Mix)
Street Jazz In My Soul	Released: March 27, 2006; Label: Seal Media; Format: CD, cassette; Track listing: 1. Intro - In My Soul (Feat. Funky Brown); 2. 소리쳐봐 (Break Me Down); 3. 차라리 (Feat. N-Son); 4. 말로 할 수 없는 말 5. Paradise (Feat. 박장근); 6. 악녀(惡女); 7. Somebody (Feat. 이시우); 8. Blue Day; 9. 한 Q (Feat. JOOSUC, Shorry J of Mighty Mouth); 10. Better Day; 11. 소리쳐봐 (Jazz ver.); 12. Epilogue - Always Mine

== Filmography ==
=== Television show ===
Year	Title	Role	Notes	Ref.
2023–present	Mr. House Husband	Cast Member	Season 2	
