= H.O.T. =

South Korean boy band

- H.O.T. in 2018; Clockwise: Jaewon, Tony, Heejun, Kangta, Woohyuk

Background information
- Origin: Seoul, South Korea
- Genres: K-pop; dance; hip hop
- Years active: 1996–2001; 2018–2019 (Note: The group also had a one off reunion in 2025.)
- Label: SM Entertainment
- Formerly of: SM Town
- Spinoffs: jtL
- Members: Moon Hee-joon; Jang Woo-hyuk; Tony Ahn; Kangta; Lee Jae-won

H.O.T. (Korean: 에이치오티; pronounced "H. O. T.", acronym for Highfive of Teenagers) were a South Korean boy band that was created by SM Entertainment in 1996. They are considered to be the first K-pop idol group and their successful formula became the model for many K-pop groups that followed them. The group consisted of five members: Moon Hee-joon, Jang Woo-hyuk, Tony Ahn, Kangta, and Lee Jae-won.

H.O.T. sold over 6.4 million records in South Korea during their career. They were also commercially successful in China and Taiwan, and were among the first stars of the Korean Wave in Asia.

The group broke up in 2001 following a contract disagreement with SM Entertainment, prompting hundreds of fans to stage protests against the company. Currently, only Kangta, an executive of SM Entertainment, remains at the company.

== Formation ==
Record producer Lee Soo-man, the founder of SM Entertainment, formed the group in 1996 by using information that he had obtained from polling high school students to find out what their idol pop group would be like. The first member to join the group was Kangta, whom Lee discovered at an amusement park. Next to join were friends and singing partners Moon Hee-joon and Lee Jae-won. Jang Woo-hyuk joined the group after attracting Lee's attention by winning first place in a dance contest. Finally, Tony Ahn joined the group after auditioning for Lee in Los Angeles.

== History ==
=== 1996–1997: Debut and breakthrough ===
H.O.T.'s first public appearance was in August 1996, at the opening stage of the 1996 012 Concert. Their TV debut came on September 7, 1996, performing "Descendants of Warriors' on the variety show Saturday! Saturday Is Fun. We Hate All Kinds of Violence, the group's debut album, was a success, selling 1.5 million copies. Their first single, "Descendants of Warriors", was a critique of schoolyard bullying, while their second single, "Candy", was a cheerful bubblegum pop song that established H.O.T.'s popularity, especially among teenage girls. That year, H.O.T. won Best New Artist at the Golden Disc Awards.

In July 1997, H.O.T. released their second album, Wolf and Sheep, which sold 1 million copies in ten days. The album included the singles "Wolf and Sheep", "Happiness", and "We Are the Future", the first of which was banned from airplay due to its use of strong language. Nonetheless, the album was both commercially and critically successful, winning the Grand Prize at both the 1997 Golden Disc Awards and the 1997 Seoul Music Awards. Additionally, "We Are the Future" was nominated for an International Viewer's Choice Award at the 1998 MTV Video Music Awards. By this time, H.O.T. had become a "social sensation" in South Korea. In 1997, H.O.T. also released their first Chinese album, the sales of which helped the group survive the slump in South Korean record sales that followed the Asian financial crisis.

=== 1998–1999: Resurrection, controversy and I Yah ===
H.O.T. released their third album, Resurrection, in September 1998. The album, which featured a variety of styles including hardcore hip hop, sold more than 1.1 million copies by the following year. At the 1998 Seoul Music Awards, Resurrection was awarded the Grand Prize, which it shared with Special Album by Sechs Kies. Netizens accused the album of plagiarism on account of alleged similarities between the album's lead single "Line Up!" and "Killing In The Name", a song by American rock band Rage Against the Machine. However, the song won the International Viewer's Choice Award for MTV Korea at the 1999 MTV Video Music Awards.

H.O.T. released a live greatest hits album in April 1999. On June 25, H.O.T. performed alongside Michael Jackson and popular South Korean girl group S.E.S. at a benefit concert in Seoul arranged by Jackson. On September 15, 1999, H.O.T. released their fourth album, I Yah!. The album's title track was about a 1999 fire that killed kindergarten students at the Sealand Youth Training Center in South Korea. The album sold more than 1.3 million copies. Shortly after the album's release on September 18, H.O.T. became the first K-pop group to perform at the Seoul Olympic Stadium, where over 40,000 fans saw them perform.

=== 2000–2001: Outside Castle, Age of Peace and disbandment ===
On February 1, 2000, H.O.T. performed for 13,000 fans in Beijing at their first concert in China. The group became immensely popular among Chinese teenagers, and reportedly sold around 400,000 copies of their albums in the country by January 2000. Their success inspired SM Entertainment and other South Korean entertainment companies to promote their artists in China. H.O.T. released their fifth album, Outside Castle, in September 2000. That year, the group also starred in the sci-fi movie Age of Peace, in which they portrayed soccer players living in a futuristic society. Despite H.O.T.'s popularity at the time, the movie was not a hit.

H.O.T. announced its disbandment at a press conference in Seoul in May 2001. Members An, Lee and Jang told the press that they were leaving S.M. Entertainment because they could not come to an agreement with the company over a new contract. In the following days, hundreds of the group's fans protested outside of S.M. Entertainment headquarters. Some fans blocked roads and threw rocks at the company headquarters' windows to protest what they believed were unjust actions against H.O.T. on the part of S.M. Entertainment. It was later reported that the contractual disagreements between H.O.T. and S.M. Entertainment concerned the group members' pay, which was only about $10,000 USD for every 1 million albums they sold.

After the split, Kangta and Moon were offered lucrative contracts by S.M. Entertainment as solo artists. An, Lee and Jang signed to Yejeon Media and formed a three-member group called jtL, which experienced moderate success before they disbanded in 2005. All five former H.O.T. members have since pursued solo careers and are still active in the entertainment industry.

=== 2018–present: Reunion and later career ===
In February 2018, H.O.T. was featured on the South Korean variety show Infinite Challenge in the "Saturday, Saturday is for Singers" (토토가) special, a recurring segment on the show which showcases famous singers from the 1990s and was notably responsible for the reunion of their first-generation counterparts Sechs Kies. All five members appeared on the show, marking their first appearance as a complete group since 2003.

During the years in between disbandment and the reunion, the possibility of a reunion had been repeatedly brought up. Following the successful reunions of their fellow first-generation groups g.o.d and Fly to the Sky in 2014, a Naver online poll revealed that H.O.T ranked first as the first-generation idol group K-pop fans most wanted to see again. In 2016 it was reported that the members had been in contact with one another and met with Lee Soo-man to discuss the possibility of reuniting for the 20th anniversary of their debut but it ultimately did not come to fruition.

On August 31, 2018, it was announced that H.O.T. would be independently holding their reunion concert, 'Forever [Highfive Of Teenagers]', on October 13 and 14 in Seoul Olympic Main Stadium with 100,000 attendees.

H.O.T. held their concert "2019 High-five Of Teenagers" in Gocheok Sky Dome from September 20 to 22, 2019.

H.O.T. reunited after six years with a performance at the 2025 Hanteo Music Festival on November 22 and 23, 2025.

== Discography ==
=== Studio albums ===
Title	Album details	Peak chart positions	Sales
Title	Album details	KOR	Sales
We Hate All Kinds of Violence	Released: September 7, 1996; Label: SM Entertainment; Format: CD, cassette, digital download	—	KOR: 1,500,000
Wolf and Sheep	Released: July 5, 1997; Label: SM Entertainment; Format: CD, cassette, digital download	—	KOR: 1,500,000
Resurrection	Released: September 24, 1998; Label: SM Entertainment; Format: CD, cassette, digital download	1	KOR: 1,103,439
I Yah!	Released: September 15, 1999; Label: SM Entertainment; Format: CD, cassette, digital download	2	KOR: 1,383,985
Outside Castle	Released: September 29, 2000; Label: SM Entertainment; Format: CD, cassette, digital download	1	KOR: 879,613; CHN: 50,000

=== Compilation albums ===
Title	Album details	Peak chart positions		Sales
Title	Album details	KOR	TWN Int.	Sales
H.O.T. 史上最惡少年	Released: January 26, 1999 (TWN); Label: Rock Records; Format: CD, digital download	—	7	
Age of Peace: The Original Soundtrack	Released: July 16, 2000 (KOR); Label: SM Entertainment; Format: CD, digital download	39	—	KOR: 231,223

=== Live albums ===
Title	Album details	Peak chart positions		Sales
Title	Album details	KOR	TWN Int.	Sales
Hi-Five of Teenagers Live Concert	Released: April 12, 1999; Label: SM Entertainment; Formats: CD, cassette, digital download	3	5	KOR: 175,314
99 Live in Seoul	Released: January 6, 2000; Label: SM Entertainment; Formats: CD, cassette, digital download	4	—	KOR: 110,542
H.O.T. Forever	Released: April 27, 2001; Label: SM Entertainment; Formats: CD, cassette, digital download	6	—	KOR: 138,616

=== Singles ===
Title	Year	Album
"Warrior's Descendant" (전사의 후예 (폭력시대; 暴力時代))	1996	We Hate All Kinds of Violence
"Candy"	1996	We Hate All Kinds of Violence
"Wolf and Sheep" (늑대와 양)	1997	Wolf and Sheep
"Full of Happiness" (행복; 幸福)	1997	Wolf and Sheep
"We Are the Future"	1997	Wolf and Sheep
"Line Up!" (열맞춰!)	1998	Resurrection
"Hope" (빛)	1998	Resurrection
"I Yah!" (아이야!)	1999	I Yah!
"Git It Up" (투지; 鬪志)	1999	I Yah!
"It's Been Raining Since You Left Me" (환희; 歡喜)	1999	I Yah!
"Outside Castle"	2000	Outside Castle
"We Can Do It" (그래! 그렇게!)	2000	Outside Castle
"A Song For Lady" (For 연가; 姸歌)	2000	Outside Castle
Chart positions are not available for singles.

=== Guest album appearances ===
- Christmas In SMTOWN (1999)
- Christmas Winter Vacation in SMTown.com (2000)

== Filmography ==
- Age of Peace (2000)

== Concerts and tours ==
=== Concert tours ===
- H.O.T. The 1st Concert (1998)
- H.O.T. USA Live Tour (1998)
- H.O.T. The 2nd Concert (1999)

=== Other concerts ===
'99 Live In Seoul
Date	City	Country	Venue	Attendance
September 18, 1999	Seoul	South Korea	Seoul Olympic Stadium	40,000

2000 H.O.T. Live Concert In Beijing
Date	City	Country	Venue	Attendance
February 1, 2000	Beijing	China	Workers Indoor Arena	13,000

2001 H.O.T. Live Concert – H.O.T. Forever
Date	City	Country	Venue	Attendance
February 27, 2001	Seoul	South Korea	Seoul Olympic Stadium	45,000

2018 Forever [High-five of Teenagers] Concert
Date	City	Country	Venue	Attendance
October 13, 2018	Seoul	South Korea	Seoul Olympic Stadium	100,000
October 14, 2018	Seoul	South Korea	Seoul Olympic Stadium	100,000

2019 [High-five of Teenagers] Next Message Concert
Date	City	Country	Venue	Attendance
September 20, 2019	Seoul	South Korea	Gocheok Sky Dome	60,000
September 21, 2019	Seoul	South Korea	Gocheok Sky Dome	60,000
September 22, 2019	Seoul	South Korea	Gocheok Sky Dome	60,000

== Awards ==
Name of the award ceremony, year presented, award category, nominee of the award and the result of the nomination
Award ceremony	Year	Category	Nominee / work	Result	Ref.
Golden Disc Awards	1996	Best New Artist	"Candy"	Won	
Golden Disc Awards	1997	Album of the Year (Daesang)	Wolf and Sheep	Won	
Golden Disc Awards	1997	Main Prize (Bonsang)	Wolf and Sheep	Won	
Golden Disc Awards	1998	Main Prize (Bonsang)	Resurrection	Won	
Golden Disc Awards	1999	Main Prize (Bonsang)	I Yah!	Won	
KBS Music Awards	1998	Grand Prize (Daesang)	"Hope"	Won	
KBS Music Awards	1998	Singer of the Year (Bonsang)	H.O.T.	Won	
KMTV Music Awards	1997	Grand Prize (Daesang)	H.O.T.	Won	
KMTV Music Awards	1997	ARS Most Popular Artist	H.O.T.	Won	
KMTV Music Awards	1997	Popular Singer Award (Bonsang)	H.O.T.	Won	
KMTV Music Awards	1998	Grand Prize (Daesang)	H.O.T.	Won	
KMTV Music Awards	1998	ARS Most Popular Artist	H.O.T.	Won	
KMTV Music Awards	1998	Popular Singer Award (Bonsang)	H.O.T.	Won	
KMTV Music Awards	1999	ARS Most Popular Artist	H.O.T.	Won	
KMTV Music Awards	1999	Popular Singer Award (Bonsang)	H.O.T.	Won	
KMTV Music Awards	1999	Best Male Dancer	H.O.T.	Won	
KMTV Music Awards	2000	Main Prize (Bonsang)	H.O.T.	Won	
KMTV Music Awards	2000	Netizen Popularity Award	H.O.T.	Won	
Korea Entertainment Arts Awards	1999	Best Youth Singer	H.O.T.	Won	
MBC Gayo Daejejeon	1997	Best Popular Song	"Happiness"	Won	
MBC Gayo Daejejeon	1998	Best Popular Song	"Hope"	Won	
MBC Gayo Daejejeon	1998	Popular Singer Award	H.O.T.	Won	
MBC Gayo Daejejeon	1999	Popular Singer Award	H.O.T.	Won	
Mnet Asian Music Awards	1999	Best Popular Music Video (Daesang)	"I Yah!"	Won	
Mnet Asian Music Awards	1999	Best Group	"I Yah!"	Won	
Mnet Asian Music Awards	1999	Best Dance Performance	"I Yah!"	Nominated	
Mnet Asian Music Awards	2000	Best Popular Music Video (Daesang)	"Outside Castle"	Won	
Mnet Asian Music Awards	2000	Best Male Group	"Outside Castle"	Nominated	
Mnet Asian Music Awards	2000	Best Dance Performance	"Outside Castle"	Nominated	
Mnet Asian Music Awards	2008	10th Anniversary Remember Award	H.O.T.	Won	
MTV Video Music Awards	1998	International Viewer's Choice Award for MTV Asia	"We Are the Future"	Nominated	
MTV Video Music Awards	1999	International Viewer's Choice Award for MTV Korea	"Line Up!"	Won	
SBS Gayo Daejeon	1996	Rookie Award	H.O.T.	Won	
SBS Gayo Daejeon	1997	Grand Prize (Daesang)	H.O.T.	Won	
SBS Gayo Daejeon	1997	Main Prize (Bonsang)	H.O.T.	Won	
SBS Gayo Daejeon	1998	Grand Prize (Daesang)	H.O.T.	Won	
SBS Gayo Daejeon	1998	Main Prize (Bonsang)	H.O.T.	Won	
Seoul Music Awards	1997	Grand Prize (Daesang)	H.O.T.	Won	
Seoul Music Awards	1997	Main Prize (Bonsang)	H.O.T.	Won	
Seoul Music Awards	1998	Grand Prize (Daesang)	H.O.T. (shared with Sechs Kies)	Won	
Seoul Music Awards	1998	Main Prize (Bonsang)	H.O.T.	Won	
Seoul Music Awards	1999	Main Prize (Bonsang)	H.O.T.	Won	

=== Listicles ===
Name of publisher, year listed, name of listicle, and placement
Publisher	Year	Listicle	Placement	Ref.
The Dong-a Ilbo	2016	Best male artists according to experts	2nd	
Golden Disc Awards	2025	Golden Disc Powerhouse 40	Placed	
Mnet	2013	Legend 100 Artists	43rd	

== See also ==
- jtL
