= Wolf and Sheep (album) =

Studio album by H.O.T.
- Released: July 5, 1997
- Recorded: 1997
- Studios: SM Studios, Seoul
- Genres: K-pop; dance-pop
- Length: 34:04
- Language: Korean
- Labels: SM; Synnara
- Producers: Yoo Young-jin; Lee Soo-man

H.O.T. chronology
| We Hate All Kinds of Violence (1996) | Wolf and Sheep (1997) | Resurrection (1998) |

Singles from Wolf and Sheep
- 1. "Wolf and Sheep"; 2. "Full of Happiness"; 3. "We Are the Future"

Wolf and Sheep is the second studio album by South Korean boy group H.O.T., released through SM Entertainment and Synnara Music on July 5, 1997. After the success of their debut album, We Hate All Kinds of Violence, H.O.T. took a hiatus from February 1997 to prepare for their second album. Lee Soo-man and Yoo Young-jin produced the album, which incorporates genres such as hip hop, dance, and R&B. It spawned three singles that were promoted with live performances on music programs: "Wolf and Sheep", "Full of Happiness", and "We Are the Future".

Though critical reception was mixed upon the album's release, it was a commercial success in South Korea, selling one million copies in ten days; by the end of 1998, it had sold more than 1.5 million copies. H.O.T. won several awards with Wolf and Sheep, including the Album Daesang at the annual Golden Disc Awards and the Grand Prize (daesang) at the Seoul Music Awards.

== Background and production ==
In September 1996, H.O.T. released their debut studio album, We Hate All Kinds of Violence. The tracks "Warrior's Descendant" and "Candy" were hit singles, making the group popular with teenagers; three months after their debut, H.O.T. won Best New Artist at the 1996 Golden Disc Awards. In February 1997, the group announced that they would temporarily stop appearing on TV in order to work on their second album. Their last performance before going on hiatus was on the SBS variety show Charge 100%.

Production took place in SM Entertainment's own studios and in studios in the United States, including in Larrabee Studio. Yoo Young-jin and Lee Soo-man acted as record producers, while both Korean and American musicians were enlisted for various aspects of production. Outside of a number of public schedules, H.O.T. spent the majority of the time in between albums working on Wolf and Sheep.

== Composition ==
Wolf and Sheep was described as featuring a variety of genres, such as hip hop, dance, and R&B. Teen Star wrote that many tracks on the album served as sequels to the group's 1996 song "Warrior's Descendant", while IZM's Wei Su-ji remarked that the album was structurally similar to their debut, comparing "Wolf and Sheep" and "Full of Happiness" to "Warrior's Descendant" and "Candy". Lyrically, the album centers around "the hardships of youth, the world of the future, and society's violence".

"Wolf and Sheep", the title track, is a gangsta rap-styled song about an invasion of Earth by "not only aliens, but all kinds of violence that occur in our society". It was inspired by the movie Independence Day and features rapping in the Jeolla dialect of Korean. The lyrics represent "the 'wolf (violence or invader)' that has invaded the world of sheep that symbolizes peace and goodness". Wolf and Sheep's second promoted track was "Full of Happiness", which samples the Christmas carol "Angels We Have Heard on High". Wei Su-ji of the music webzine IZM described its lyrics as expressing "the pure and exciting love of teenagers". The third single, "We Are the Future", is a Eurodance song that serves as a "warning to the narrow-minded old generation". Music critic Han Dong-yoon said that the song was "created with the members' solo dancing parts in mind". It uses samples from sample CDs and incorporates the melody of "Tour de France" by Kraftwerk. Other tracks include "Free to Fly", an R&B number that centers around Kangta, and "Go! H.O.T.!", the lyrics of which name the group's members.

== Release, artwork, and promotion ==
Wolf and Sheep was released as H.O.T.'s second studio album on July 5, 1997, by SM Entertainment and Synnara Music. The album was originally supposed to release on June 28 but was delayed. The album cover, inspired by graffiti art, was designed by a team of artists from Los Angeles. Graffiti text was used on the album cover, inside the booklet (where the members' names were written with graffiti), and on the members' clothes. The photos in the album were taken by Heo Jong-tae along with an American photographer.

On June 28, 1997, H.O.T. were to make their comeback on MBC Top Music, then hold a concert for the inauguration ceremony of their fan club. Two days before the scheduled performance, however, Moon Hee-jun caught tenosynovitis; the next day, all of H.O.T. except Moon performed "Candy" on TV Gayo 20 while a prerecorded video of Moon in the hospital played. H.O.T. could not perform on MBC because the network had deemed the line "those wolves, those damned animals" (Note: Korean: 늑대, 빌어먹을 짐승같은 놈들) unfit for broadcast. The line was changed to "those wolves, those animal-like... huh!". (Note: Korean: 늑대, 짐승같은, huh!) On August 5, the group first performed "Full of Happiness" on KMTV's Show Music Tank; following a trip to the US, they began promoting "We Are the Future", starting with a TV Gayo 20 performance on October 10.

In September 1997, H.O.T.'s first fan club inauguration ceremony was held as part of album-related promotional activities. In January 1998, the group held a solo concert tour in South Korea before embarking on a tour in the United States the following month. It made stops in New York City, Washington D.C., Honolulu and Los Angeles. From January 23 to 25, the group held a concert at the Olympic Gymnastics Arena coinciding with the end of their second album promotions.

== Reception ==
Wolf and Sheep received mixed critical reviews upon its release. In 1997, a writer in the JoongAng Ilbo stated Wolf and Sheep was more polished than the group's debut in terms of rap technique and that there were a number of songs with pleasing melodies in the album, commenting on the variety of genres included. However, they wrote that the gangsta rap the group professed was vague and contrived. A Chosun Ilbo article quoted a music producer as saying that Wolf and Sheep lacked songs that appealed to their ears; the article wrote that the album had been commonly received unfavorably.

In a February 2013 review of the album, critic Wei Su-ji of the webzine IZM complimented the record's composition and felt that the songs were more refined compared to the group's previous effort. Wei highlighted "Wolf and Sheep" and "Full of Happiness" as musical parallels to "Warrior's Descendant" and "Candy", with each track representing a "strong man" and a "lively boy" persona that teenage boys can possess. She additionally complimented the melodies and lyrics of the ballad tracks "Free to Fly" and "You & I". Conversely, music critic Kim Bong-hyeon stated that although he found tracks such as "Free to Fly" exceptional, the album felt more like a product than a piece of art.

Commercially, Wolf and Sheep recorded sales of over 1 million copies within ten days. It was the best selling album of 1997 in South Korea, according to Synnara Record, and by the end of 1998, it had sold more than 1.5 million copies in South Korea. In China, it reportedly sold over 50,000 copies in 1998.

== Accolades ==
Awards and nominations
| Award ceremony | Year | Category | Nominee / work | Result | Ref. |
|---|---|---|---|---|---|
| Golden Disc Awards | 1997 | Album of the Year (Daesang) | Wolf and Sheep | Won | |
| Golden Disc Awards | 1997 | Main Prize (Bonsang) | Wolf and Sheep | Won | |
| MBC Gayo Daejejeon | 1997 | Best Popular Song | "Full of Happiness" | Won | |
| MTV Video Music Awards | 1998 | International Viewer's Choice for MTV Asia | "We Are the Future" | Nominated | |

Music program awards
| Song | Program | Date | Ref. |
|---|---|---|---|
| "Full of Happiness" | Popular Songs Best 50 | August 23, 1997 | |
| "Full of Happiness" | Popular Songs Best 50 | August 30, 1997 | |
| "Full of Happiness" | Popular Songs Best 50 | September 6, 1997 | |
| "Full of Happiness" | TV Songs 20 | August 31, 1997 | |
| "Full of Happiness" | TV Songs 20 | September 7, 1997 | |
| "Full of Happiness" | TV Songs 20 | September 14, 1997 | |
| "Full of Happiness" | TV Songs 20 | September 28, 1997 | |
| "Full of Happiness" | Top 10 Songs | September 17, 1997 | |
| "Full of Happiness" | Top 10 Songs | September 24, 1997 | |
| "Full of Happiness" | Top 10 Songs | October 1, 1997 | |
| "We Are the Future" | TV Songs 20 | November 9, 1997 | |
| "We Are the Future" | TV Songs 20 | November 16, 1997 | |
| "We Are the Future" | TV Songs 20 | November 23, 1997 | |
| "We Are the Future" | TV Songs 20 | November 30, 1997 | |
| "We Are the Future" | Popular Songs Best 50 | November 22, 1997 | |
| "We Are the Future" | Popular Songs Best 50 | December 13, 1997 | |
| "We Are the Future" | Popular Songs Best 50 | December 20, 1997 | |

== Concert tour ==
=== 98 H.O.T. 1st Concert ===
Concert dates
| Date | City | Country | Venue | Attendance |
|---|---|---|---|---|
| January 23, 1998 | Seoul | South Korea | Olympic Gymnastics Arena | 36,000 |
| January 24, 1998 | Seoul | South Korea | Olympic Gymnastics Arena | 36,000 |
| January 25, 1998 | Seoul | South Korea | Olympic Gymnastics Arena | 36,000 |
| January 30, 1998 (2 shows) | Busan | South Korea | Sajik Arena | — |
| Total | | | | N/A |

== Tracklist ==
| No. | Title | Lyrics | Music | Length |
|---|---|---|---|---|
| 1. | "Go! H.O.T.!" | Yoo Young-jin | Yoo Young-jin | 2:59 |
| 2. | "Wolf and Sheep" (늑대와 양; Neugdaewa Yang) | Yoo Young-jin | Yoo Young-jin | 4:14 |
| 3. | "Free to Fly" (자유롭게 날 수 있도록; Jayuropge Nal Su Ittorok) | Yoo Young-jin | Yoo Young-jin | 4:39 |
| 4. | "We Are the Future" | Yoo Young-jin | Yoo Young-jin | 3:40 |
| 5. | "Full of Happiness" (행복; Haengbog) | Jang Yong-jin | Jang Yong-jin | 3:31 |
| 6. | "The End of My Inferiority Complex" (열등감; Yeoldeung-gam) | Yoo Young-jin | Yoo Young-jin | 2:56 |
| 7. | "Lost 12th Birthday" (12번째 생일; 12beonjjae Saeng-il) | Kwak Sang-yeop | Tino | 3:56 |
| 8. | "Tragedy" | Kwak Sang-yeop | Kwak Sang-yeop | 3:50 |
| 9. | "You & I" (너와 나; Neowa Na) | Kwak Sang-yeop | Kim Su-ji | 4:16 |
| Total length: | | | | 34:04 |

== Release history ==
Release history for Wolf and Sheep
| Region | Date | Formats | Label | Ref. |
|---|---|---|---|---|
| South Korea | July 5, 1997 | CD; cassette | SM Entertainment | |

== See also ==
- List of best-selling albums in South Korea
