= Wolf and Sheep =

Wolf and Sheep may refer to:

- Wolf and Sheep (film), a 2016 Danish-Afghan drama film
- Wolf and Sheep (album), a 1997 album by H.O.T.
