= JtL =

2001–2004 South Korean boyband

jtL
- Origin: Seoul, South Korea
- Genres: R&B; pop; Korean hip hop; dance
- Years active: 2001–2005
- Label: Yejeon Media
- Spinoffs: H.O.T.
- Past members: Jang Woo-hyuk; Tony Ahn; Lee Jae-won

JTL (제이티엘) was a South Korean dance music group, consisting of the former H.O.T. members who left SM Entertainment – Jang Woo-hyuk, Tony Ahn and Lee Jae-won.

== History ==
All three members of jtL had first come together as members of the South Korean boy band H.O.T., which debuted in 1996 and achieved nationwide fame, becoming known as the first idol group and selling 6.4 million records in South Korea during their career. Despite the group's popularity, Woohyuk, Jaewon, and Tony entered disputes with their label, SM Entertainment, regarding the group members pay, which according to their contract was about $10,000 USD for every 1 million albums they sold. Unable to agree to a new contract, Woohyuk, Jaewon, and Tony formally announced that they had signed with Yejeon Media on May 14, and that H.O.T. would be disbanding, resulting in protests from fans of the group.

Following H.O.T.'s disbandment, it was announced on December 18, 2001, that the three would be resuming their activities as a group called jtL, with plans for a new album to be released on the 21st, followed by large scale promotions beginning in January 2002. The group's debut album, Enter the Dragon, proved to be incredibly popular, selling over 530,000 copies during the first month on the market. However, the group's music video and singles were banned from various Korean entertainment broadcasts which drew angry reactions from the group's fans, some of whom egged SM Entertainment's main building in Seoul, with many reports suggesting SM CEO Lee Soo-man was actively attempting to blacklist the group. The members of the group also had strained relationships between Kangta and Moon Hee-jun after the two chose to stay with SM Entertainment as solo artists. However, after appearances on 'X-Man', it appears that Tony and Kangta are on good terms the same goes for Moon Hee Jun and Jang Woo Hyuk who both appeared on variety show Heroine.

In December 2002, jtL returned with a special album, Love Story, featuring remixes of songs from their first album and five new songs. The group reportedly refrained from broadcast promotions Love Story in preparation for their second album, which was targeting a March or April 2003 release.

In 2003 the group won the "favorite artist of Korea" award at the MTV Asia Awards, where they performed alongside artists such as Avril Lavigne and Linkin Park.

On September 6, 2004, JTL performed on the closing stage of the Shanghai International Circuit Opening Ceremony, reportedly moved to the closing spot as a result of the group's growing popularity in China. The group's final activity was on June 19, 2005, at the All For One In Asia - Dokdo Love Concert, where they performed "A Better Day", "Enter the Dragon", and "Without Your Love". While the group never formally disbanded, member Woohyuk stated in a 2011 interview that the group "quietly disappeared" and that the members believed that an H.O.T. reunion would be more preferable.

== Discography ==
=== Studio albums ===
Title	Album details	Peak chart positions	Sales
Title	Album details	KOR	Sales
Enter The Dragon	Released: December 20, 2001; Label: Yejeon Media; Format: CD, cassette	1	KOR: 538,754
Love Story	Released: December 18, 2002; Label: Yejeon Media; Format: CD, cassette	5	KOR: 124,428
Run Away	Released: August 14, 2003; Label: Yejeon Media; Format: CD, cassette	2	KOR: 111,140

== Awards and nominations ==
Award	Year	Category	Nominated work/nominee	Result
KMTV Korea Music Awards	2003	Singer of the Year	JtL	Won
Mandarin Music Honors (Note: The Mandarin Music Honors were co-hosted by MTV and CCTV.)	2002	Best New Group	JtL	Won
Mnet Music Video Festival	2002	Best Male Group	"A Better Day"	Nominated
Mnet Music Video Festival	2003	Best Male Group	"Without Your Love"	Nominated
Mnet Music Video Festival	2003	Best Dance Performance	"Without Your Love"	Nominated
MTV Asia Awards	2003	Favorite Artist - Korea	JtL	Won

== See also ==
- H.O.T.
- Pikki Pikki dance
