= Koo Jun-yup =

South Korean singer and DJ (born 1969)

- 구준엽
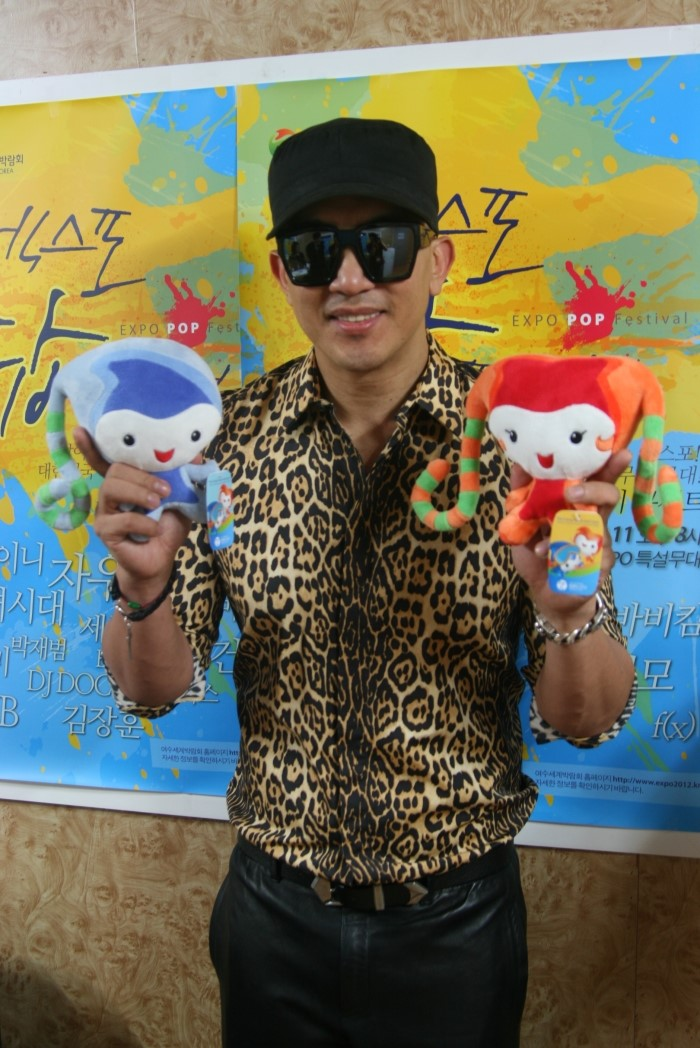
- Koo in 2014
- Born: September 11, 1969 (age 57); Seoul, South Korea
- Education: Kyungnam University
- Occupations: Singer; DJ; music producer; dancer; songwriter
- Years active: 1996–present
- Spouse: Barbie Hsu (m. 2022; died 2025)
- Musical career
- Also known as: DJ Koo
- Genres: K-pop; Hip pop; R&B; Dance music; EDM
- Instrument: Vocals
- Labels: Media Line Entertainment (South Korea); Rock Records (Taiwan)
- Member of: CLON
- Formerly of: Tak and Jun; Hyun Jin-young and Wawa

Korean name
- Hangul: 구준엽
- Hanja: 具俊曄
- RR: Gu Junyeop
- MR: Ku Chunyŏp

Koo Jun-yup (Korean: 구준엽; born September 11, 1969), also known by his stage name DJ Koo, is a South Korean singer-songwriter and DJ. A member of K-pop duo CLON, Koo is one of the first-generation Hallyu stars and since the 2000s has pursued a solo career as a DJ and actor.

== Early life ==
Koo was born and raised in Seoul, South Korea. He has an older sister Koo Eun-yeong (구은영; 具恩英). His parents divorced when he was eleven years old. He went to Seoul Sinjung Elementary School and Seocho Middle School. Koo attended Kyunggi High School, where he met fellow CLON member Kang Won-rae. Koo graduated from Kyungnam University with a bachelor's degree in Industrial Design.

== Career ==
=== Career beginnings ===
In 1990, Koo and his best friend from Kyunggi High School Kang Won-rae joined a dancing competition, which they won fourth and first place respectively. Koo and Kang were signed by Lee Soo-man, founder of SM Entertainment, as backup dancers for singer Hyun Jin-young and formed a group called Hyun Jin-young and Wawa. In 1991, Koo enlisted for his two-year mandatory military service and began to serve in the army. After completing his military service, he and singer Lee Tak briefly formed a group called Tak and Jun in 1993 and released their single titled "Hunch".

=== 1996–2002: CLON ===
In 1996, Koo and Kang Won-rae were signed by Media Line Entertainment and debuted as CLON. Their first album Are You Ready? (1996), featured the hit song "Kungtari Shabara", sold over 1.12 million copies in South Korea.

In 1998, CLON signed with Rock Records and released the Taiwanese version of One More Time, which was a compilation of hit songs from Clon's first album Are You Ready? (1996) and second album One More Time (1997). Koo took the title of "Taiwan's Sexiest Man" in 1998 and 1999. He was also selected as the "Best-Dressed Male Celebrity" by Taiwanese designers. CLON soon gained international popularity and became stars that led the Korean wave in Asia.

In 1999, Clon released their third album Funky Together. In 2000, Clon released their fourth album New World (2000) which sold over a million copies in Asia. In August 2000, Clon held their live concert in Taipei. In September 2000, Clon won the "International Viewer's Choice Award for MTV Korea" at the 2000 MTV Video Music Awards.

In November 2000, fellow CLON member Kang Won-rae got into a tragic motorcycle accident which left him paralyzed from the waist down. The management company asked Koo to go solo and take advantage of his popularity, but he refused. Koo took a long hiatus from his musical career to take care of his best friend till Kang was able to sit in a wheelchair on his own.

In 2001, Koo and Kang received the Achievement Award at the 2001 Mnet Asian Music Awards. In 2002, CLON released their first compilation album titled The Best of Clon. The album contains three new songs. New song "Friend" is written by CLON and contains a message from Koo to his friend Kang Won-rae. "La La La" and "Kick It" feature singer Uhm Jung-hwa. "Kick It" is also the official cheering song for the 2002 FIFA World Cup.

=== 2003–2005: KooJunYup and Victory ===
After a long hiatus from his music career, Koo released his self-titled debut studio album in November 2003. KooJunYup (2003) featured songs like "Escape", "You're My Life", and "Thinking About You". The solo album was a precursor to the comeback of CLON. "Escape" was nominated as "Best Buzz Asia South Korea" at the 2004 MTV Video Music Awards Japan. Koo performed at the 2003 Mnet Asian Music Awards, including songs like "You're My Life", "Escape", "I", and "Thinking About You". In December 2003, Koo was invited as one of the Korean performers at the 5th Korea-China Song Festival, hosted by KBS and China's CCTV and performed "Escape" and "Kungtari Shabara". In 2004, Koo was one of the performers at the Open Concert for the 2004 Athens Olympics Delegation Departure Ceremony where he performed hit songs "Come Back to Me", "First Love", "World Cup", and "Kungtari Shabara".

In 2005, Koo reunited with Kang Won-Rae and released their fifth album, Victory (2005), with "My Dear Love, Song" as its lead track. In order to perform with Kang Won-rae on the stage again, Koo specially choreographed a wheelchair dance, which was nominated as the Best Dance Performance at the 2005 Mnet Asian Music Awards. In addition, Koo along with singers Jang Woo-hyuk, Lee-Min-woo, and Kang Won-rae performed a dance medley at the 2005 Mnet Asian Music Awards. CLON was invited as one of the performers at the 7th Korea-China Song Festival where they performed songs like "Bing Bing Bing" and "Kungtari Shabara". In December 2005, CLON held their tenth anniversary concert in Seoul called The Miracle.

=== 2006–present: DJ KOO ===
As a successful singer and dance icon, Koo has also focused his musical career on DJing. In 2006, Koo held a performance under the title of "Call me DJ KOO" at a club in Gangnam. It was a declaration ceremony for "Call me DJ Koo from Koo Jun-yup". In 2008, he explored electronic dance music or EDM with the release of his first extended play I'm DJ KOO (2008) which he added tecktonik dance to his lead track "Let Me". In December 2008, Koo held "DJ Koo with Friends" live concert with veteran singers Kim Gun-mo and Park Mi-kyung. In 2008 and 2009, Koo was invited as one of the performers at the Korea-China Song Festival where he sang his hit song "Let Me".

Koo has not only contributed to introducing EDM to the Korean fans but also producing his own music. On August 13, 2011, Koo released his second extended play Comeback Remix, which he was in charge of arranging and producing. The album consists of four remixed versions of Clon's 1999 hit song "Come Back". He incorporated shuffle dance to Comeback Remix (2011). Koo, who caused a tecktonik craze with his last album I'm DJ KOO (2008), made shuffle dance a national dance this time following tecktonik. In the same year, Koo was appointed as the ambassador for the 2011 Mnet Asian Music Awards. He also released his new digital single "Music Makes One" which he produced for the Mnet Asian Music Awards. In December 2011, Koo held his live concert "Christmas Eve Dance Party with DJ Koo".

In 2012, CLON held their mini concert to commemorate the 10th anniversary of the 2002 Korea-Japan World Cup. Their song "Kick It" was the World Cup song that led the World Cup mood in 2002. In the same year, Koo performed at the Expo Pop Festival at Yeosu Expo special stage. In 2013, he released his EP Bob Bob Dee Lala (2013), a collection of different remixed versions of Clon's hit song "I" (Nan). He was invited as a special guest at Mnet's "M Countdown Nihao Taiwan", held at the Taipei Arena. In the same year, he attended the 2013 KCON, an annual Korean wave convention, (aka "M Countdown What's Up LA") in Los Angeles. He also performed at the 2013 Asian Song Festival and attended the 2013 Style Icon Awards. Between 2011 and 2014, Koo performed at the Ultra Music Festival, world's biggest EDM festival which takes place in Miami, Florida each year. He is recognized as the DJ that represents Korea. In 2013, he also played at Road to Ultra Japan.

In 2014, Koo was featured in singer IU's cover version of Clon's 1996 hit song "Kungtari Shabara", titled "Boom Ladi Dadi", alongside Kang Won-rae. In 2015, Koo and DJ Maximite produced the song "Pick Me" for television show Produce 101. In 2016, Koo performed at the 2016 DMC Festival. In the same year, Koo was appointed as the music director for the 2016 FIS Freestyle Ski World Cup and FIS Snowboard World Cup. Koo attended the 2016 Korea Best Dresser Swan Awards. Koo also performed at Ultra Korea from 2012 to 2019 at the Seoul Olympic Stadium.

In 2017, Koo reunited with Kang for CLON's 20th anniversary album titled, We Are (2017). The album features the powerful and rhythmic electronic dance music with "Everybody" as its lead track. The whole album was co-written by Koo and producer Kim Chang-hwan. Other songs include "Go Tomorrow", which featured the innovative genre of EDM, "Ore Ore O", a remixed version of Clon's classic hit "First Love", and "90's DJ Koo Driving Mix", a lengthy track that is a mishmash of Clon's 14 hits.

In 2018, Koo was appointed as the music director for the 2018 Paralympic Winter Games. He and Kang Won-rae reunited as CLON at the opening ceremony and performed "Go Tomorrow" and "Kungtari Shabara" at the Pyeongchang Olympic Stadium. In the 2019 Dream Concert, one of the largest K-pop joint concerts, Koo and co-ed group KARD performed hit songs from CLON including "I", "First Love, and "Kungtari Shabara". Clon member Kang Won-rae also appeared as a special guest. In 2020 and 2021, Koo played at the Seoul World DJ Festival which were held online both years due to the COVID-19 pandemic.

In April 2022, Koo performed in public for the first time since his marriage to Taiwanese actress Barbie Hsu. He performed at a top club in Taipei where he played his own remixed versions of Clon's hit songs "Bing Bing Bing" and "First Love".

=== As an actor ===
Koo made his acting debut in 2002 through television series Age of Innocence (2002) followed by April Kiss (2004). He also appeared in the movie Demilitarized Zone (2004) and made cameo appearances in television series Dream High (2011) and Kill Me, Heal Me (2015).

== Personal life ==
Koo was introduced to Taiwanese actress Barbie Hsu, who was a fan of his, by singer Yuki Hsu at a party in Korea. The two began a relationship, although it was not publicly confirmed. During this time, Koo faced pressure from his management, who were concerned that a public romance could harm his image as an idol, while Hsu endured criticism from Koo's fanbase due to circulating rumors. In May 2000, Clon canceled a scheduled appearance on Hsu's variety show 100% Entertainment to avoid fueling further speculation. The incident led Dee, Barbie's sister, to publicly criticize Koo and his management on air. Although their breakup has often been attributed to a dating ban imposed by his agency, Koo later clarified that he made the decision to end the relationship himself, citing concern for his career. After Hsu's divorce in 2021, Koo and Hsu rekindled their relationship and registered their marriage on February 8, 2022, in South Korea and on March 28, 2022, in Taiwan. Koo and Hsu did not host a wedding ceremony, but have wedding ring tattoos on the ring fingers of their left hands. After their marriage, Koo moved to Taipei. In 2025, Hsu died at the age of 48, one week short of their third wedding anniversary.

== Other ventures ==
=== Business ventures ===
In 2001, Koo launched his own clothing line "Allen. A" in Dongdaemun District. In 2010, Koo co-founded men's underwear line "Kinkinine". It was created by adding "kinki" with a New Yorker feel to "nine", which means "Gu" (Koo). In 2021, Koo launched his own fashion label "Uncle Bald". The brand is targeted at biker and military fashion for men. The brand produces clothes and accessories.

=== Art and NFT ===
In 2010, Koo participated in the open showcase of the "Samsung NX10 Creative Photo Gallery". Photos taken by Koo using Samsung's NX10 were displayed at the photo gallery.

Koo released his artwork through NFT for the first time in 2021 and it sold out in 17 minutes. In 2022, Koo published a limited edition NFT artwork in partnership with Kakao Ground X Clip Drops which sold out in 7 seconds.

=== Book ===
In 2010, Koo released his debut book on Korean club culture titled DJ Koo's Power Club.

== Discography ==
=== Studio album ===
Album title	Release date	Track list
KooJunYup	November 26, 2003 (Korea); January 16, 2004 (Taiwan); Language: Korean; Label: Media Line and Rock Records	1. "Proceed" (Intro); 2. "Escape"; 3. "Comfort"; 4. "Party Time"; 5. "You're My Life"; 6. "See You Again"; 7. "Thinking About You" (Interlude); 8. "Classic Bounce"; 9. "Hidden Card"; 10. "Don't Cry"; 11. "Sad Caring"; 12. "Fate"; 13. "Forbidden Love"; 14. "Let's Get It"; 15. "Space Jam" (Outro)

=== Extended plays ===
Title	Release date	Track list
I'm DJ KOO	June 20, 2008	1. "Let Me" (Original Version); 2. "Why" (왜) (Original Version); 3. "Let Me" (Extended Version); 4. "Why" (왜) (Extended Version); 5. "Let Me" (Instrumental); 6. "Why" (왜) (Instrumental)
Comeback Remix	August 13, 2011	1. "Comeback" (DJ Koo Original Mix); 2. "Comeback" (Postino Mo'80 Mix); 3. "Comeback" (Postino Mo'bass Mix); 4. "Comeback" (DJ Koo Extended Mix)
Bob Bob Dee Lala	March 4, 2013	1. "Bob Bob Dee Lala"; 2. "Bob Bob Dee Lala" (Sionz Remix); 3. "Bob Bob Dee Lala" (Steve Wu Remix); 4. "Bob Bob Dee Lala" (Shut Da Mouth Remix)
The Meaning of Life	July 17, 2014	1. "The Meaning of Life" (Original Ver); 2. "The Meaning of Life" (Maximite & Opro Electro House Mix); 3. "The Meaning of Life" (Ferry Hyper Dutch House Re-Mix); 4. "The Meaning of Life" (Beatrappa Melbourne Bounce Club Mix); 5. "The Meaning of Life" (Paralyze Idea Tech House Mix); 6. "The Meaning of Life" (DJ Steve Wu Progressive House Mix); 7. "The Meaning of Life" (Dion & Opro Progressive House Radio Mix)
Best Night of My Life	December 11, 2015	1. "Best Night of My Life" (Electro House Mix); 2. "Best Night of My Life" (Progressive House Mix); 3. "Best Night of My Life" (Future House Mix)

=== As featured artist ===
Year	Title	歌手	Notes
1997	"Circle"	Tarcy Su	
1998	"Chacha"	Fengie Wang	
2014	"Boom Ladi Dadi"	IU	Cover version of Clon's Kungtari Shabara

=== Compositions ===
Year	Title	Singer	Notes
2002	"Friend"	Clon	The Best of Clon 2002
2008	"Get Hot"	Hwangbo	DJ KOO REMIX
2011	"Music Makes One"	Yoon Mi Rae	Official song for the 2011 Mnet Asian Music Awards
2015	"나는나비"	YB	DJ KOO REMIX
2015	"Pick Me"	Produce 101 contestants	Produce 101 Season 1
2017	"He's Not Worth It"	Sun Sheng Xi	DJ KOO REMIX
2017	"Everybody"	Clon	We Are
2017	"Bamdeelalila"	Clon	We Are
2017	"Go Tomorrow"	Clon	We Are
2017	"Ore Ore O"	Clon	We Are
2017	"Bab Bab Dee Lala"	Clon	We Are
2017	"90's DJ Koo Driving Mix"	Clon	We Are
2019	"Heartcrusher"	Ailee	Butterfly
2019	"Sidekick"	K-Tigers Zero	Prod. DJ KOO
2021	"Yeah, Now"	Yao Chen	

== Filmography ==
=== Film ===
Year	Title	Role
1991	Tomorrow's Champion	—N/a
2004	Demilitarized Zone	Kang Dae-nam

=== TV series ===
Year	Title	Role
2002	Age of Innocence	Young-hee
2004	April Kiss	—N/a
2011	Dream High	Cameo – Host of dance competition (Episode 9 and 10)
2015	Kill Me, Heal Me	Cameo – Club Paradise DJ (Episode 1)
2023	Takeshi's Castle	Cameo - Episode 1 - Spinning Beach Boys and Gals

== Awards and nominations ==
Year	Award	Category	Nominated work	Result
1996	Golden Disc Awards	Main Prize (Bonsang)	Are You Ready?	Won
1996	KMTV Music Awards	Popular Singer Award (Bonsang)	—N/a	Won
1996	Seoul Music Awards	Grand Prize (Daesang)	Are You Ready?	Won
1996	SBS Gayo Daejeon	Main Prize (Bonsang)	Are You Ready?	Won
1996	KBS Song Festival	Singer of the Year (Bonsang)	—N/a	Won
1997	Golden Disc Awards	Main Prize (Bonsang)	One More Time	Won
1997	KBS Song Festival	Singer of the Year (Bonsang)	—N/a	Won
1999	Golden Disc Awards	Popularity Award	—N/a	Won
1999	KMTV Music Awards	Main Prize (Bonsang)	Funky Together	Won
1999	Seoul Music Awards	Main Prize (Bonsang)	Funky Together	Won
1999	KBS Song Festival	Singer of the Year (Bonsang)	—N/a	Won
1999	Mnet Asian Music Awards	Best Dance Performance	"Come Back"	Nominated
2000	Golden Disc Awards	Achievement Award	—N/a	Won
2000	MTV Video Music Awards	International Viewer's Choice for MTV Korea	"First Love"	Won
2000	Mnet Asian Music Awards	Best Dance Performance	"First Love"	Won
2000	Mnet Asian Music Awards	Best Male Group	"First Love"	Nominated
2000	KMTV Music Awards	Main Prize (Bonsang)	New World	Won
2000	SBS Gayo Daejeon	Special Achievement Award	—N/a	Won
2000	KBS Song Festival	Singer of the Year (Bonsang)	—N/a	Won
2001	Mnet Asian Music Awards	Achievement Award	—N/a	Won
2004	MTV Video Music Awards Japan	Best Buzz Asia from South Korea	"Escape"	Nominated
2005	Mnet Asian Music Awards	Best Dance Performance	"Dear My Love, Song"	Nominated
