= Clon (duo) =

South Korean dance music duo

- Origin: South Korea
- Genres: Dance music; K-pop
- Years active: 1996–2005; 2017–present
- Members: Kang Won-rae; Koo Jun-yup

Clon (Korean: 클론) is a South Korean dance music duo that debuted in 1996. The group was extremely popular in South Korea in the late 1990s.

== Career ==
The duo debuted as part of "Hyun Jin Young and Wawa" in 1990 but it wasn't until 1996 under the supervision of Kim Chang Hwan, a major figure in the Korean music industry, that they got together and formed Clon. Their debut album, "Are You Ready?", proved to be extremely popular. They were often credited for being one of the first groups to incorporate strong dance routines with catchy beats. Clon was produced through DreamBeat, a record label that was popular for other hit singers as well as bringing western music to Korea.

In November 2000, a tragic and unfortunate motorcycle accident left Kang Won Rae paralyzed from the waist down. Initially the duo decided to disband but in the summer of 2005 they made a comeback with their 5th album, "Victory". The title track of the album was called "Nae Sarang Song-i" (My Love "Song") and was dedicated to Kang's wife, Kim Song, who encouraged and stood by him through those tough 5 years.

Although the duo unofficially disbanded after the album's release, they occasionally met for events or promotional activities.

After 12 years, the duo decided to officially make a comeback. The 21 June 2017, they released their single BAMDEELALILA featuring Ailee. The 28 June 2017, they released Everybody starring as a dancer in the music video the previous concurrent of Produce 101 Season 2 Lee Woo Jin, they are both from the same company.

== Discography ==
=== Studio albums ===
Title	Album details	Peak chart positions	Sales
Title	Album details	KOR	Sales
Are You Ready?	Released: May 1, 1996; Label: KC Harmony; Formats: CD, cassette	No data	KOR: 1,120,000+
One More Time	Released: June 8, 1997; Label: Line Production; Formats: CD, cassette	No data	No data
Funky Together	Released: March 27, 1999; Label: Retro; Formats: CD, cassette	8	KOR: 265,008+
New World	Released: April 6, 2000; Label: KC Harmony; Formats: CD, cassette	2	KOR: 418,987+
Victory	Released: July 8, 2005; Label: Media Line; Formats: CD, cassette	16	KOR: 16,281+

=== Compilations ===
Title	Album details	Peak chart positions	Sales
Title	Album details	KOR	Sales
The Best Hits of Clon	Released: May 23, 2002; Label: Media Line; Formats: CD, cassette	9	KOR: 71,542+

=== Extended plays ===
Title	Album details	Peak chart positions	Sales
Title	Album details	KOR	Sales
We Are	Released: June 29, 2017; Label: Media Line; Formats: CD, digital download	—	—N/a

== Awards ==
=== Mnet Asian Music Awards ===
Year	Category	Work	Result
2000	Best Dance Performance	"Choryeon"	Won
2000	Best Male Group	"Choryeon"	Nominated
2001	Achievement Award	—N/a	Won
2005	Best Dance Performance	"My Love Song" (Korean: 내 사랑송 이)	Nominated
