= MAMA Award for Best Male Group =

Annual award presented by Mnet

- Awarded for: Best male group of the year
- Country: South Korea
- Presented by: CJ E&M Pictures (Mnet)
- First award: 1999
- Currently held by: Seventeen (2025)

Highlights
- Most awards: Shinhwa, BTS (4 each)
- Most nominations: Shinhwa, Seventeen (9 each)
- Website: Mnet Asian Music Awards

The MAMA Award for Best Male Group (남자 그룹상) is an award presented annually by CJ E&M Pictures (Mnet). Mnet is also the one who choose which group will to this category as well as other categories in MAMA.

It was first awarded at the 1st Mnet Asian Music Awards ceremony held in 1999; the band H.O.T. won the award for their song "I Yah!", and it is given in honor for the male group with the most artistic achievement in the music industry.

== Winners and nominees ==
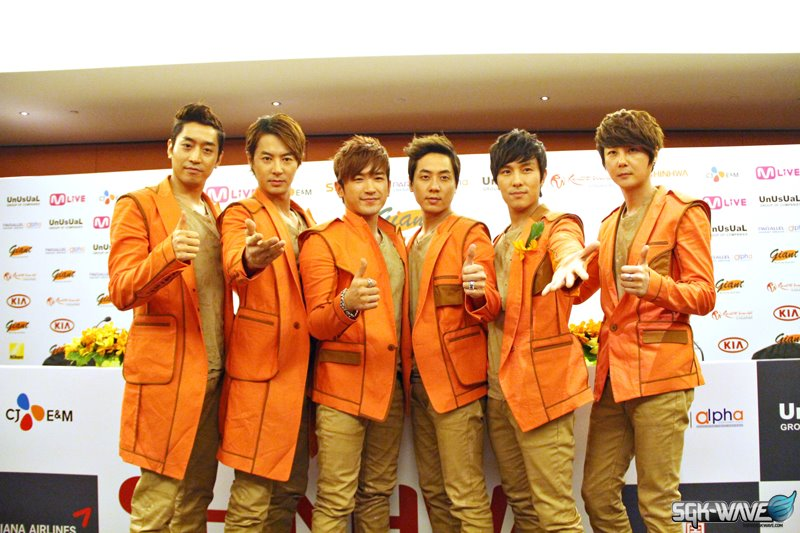
Shinhwa, (2001–04)

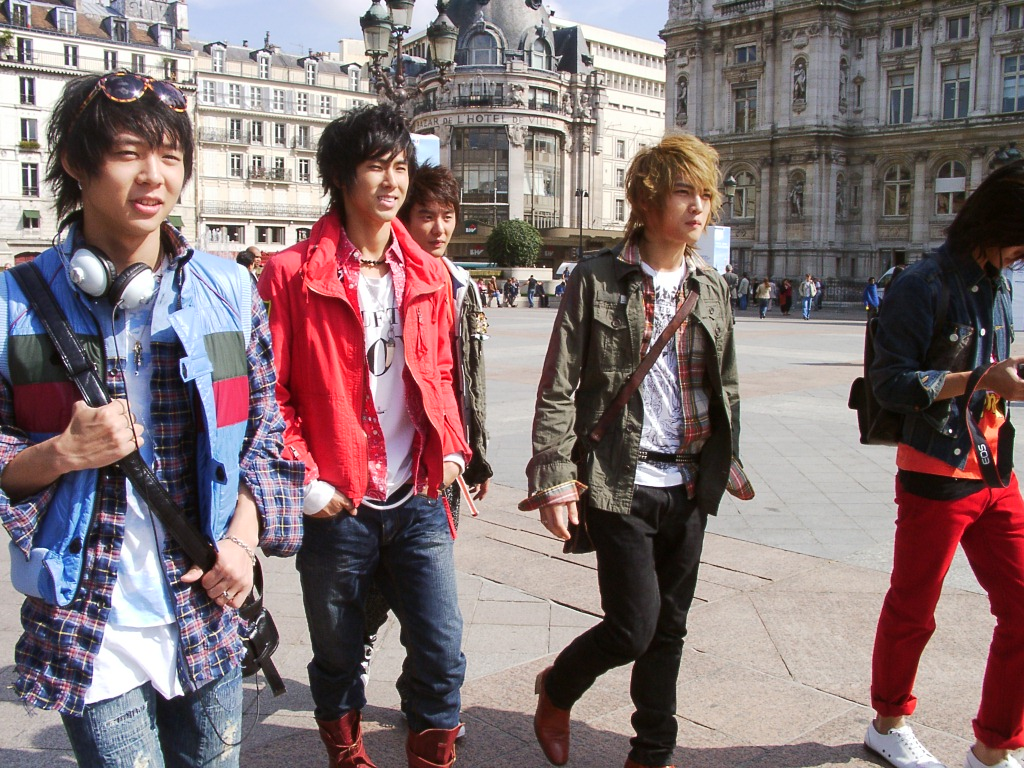
TVXQ, (2006)

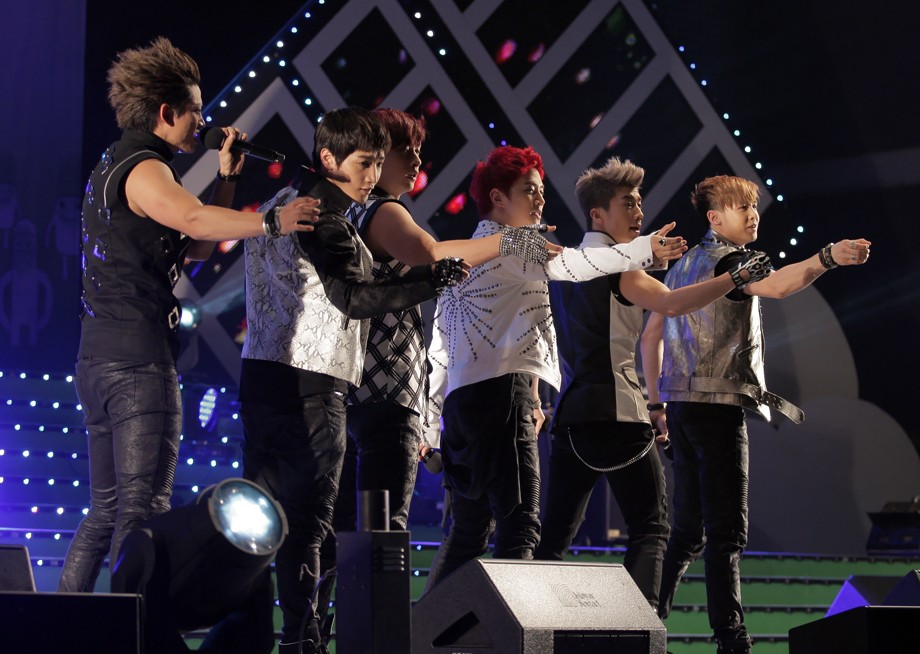
2PM, (2009–10)

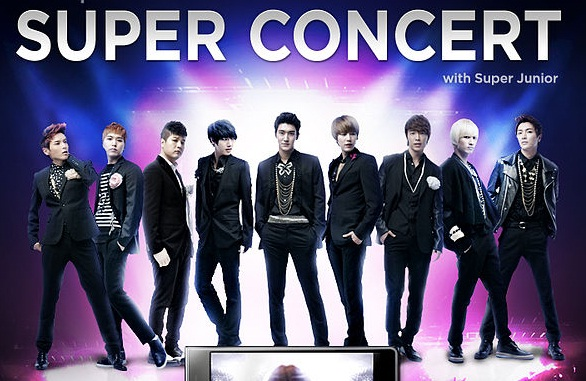
Super Junior, (2011)

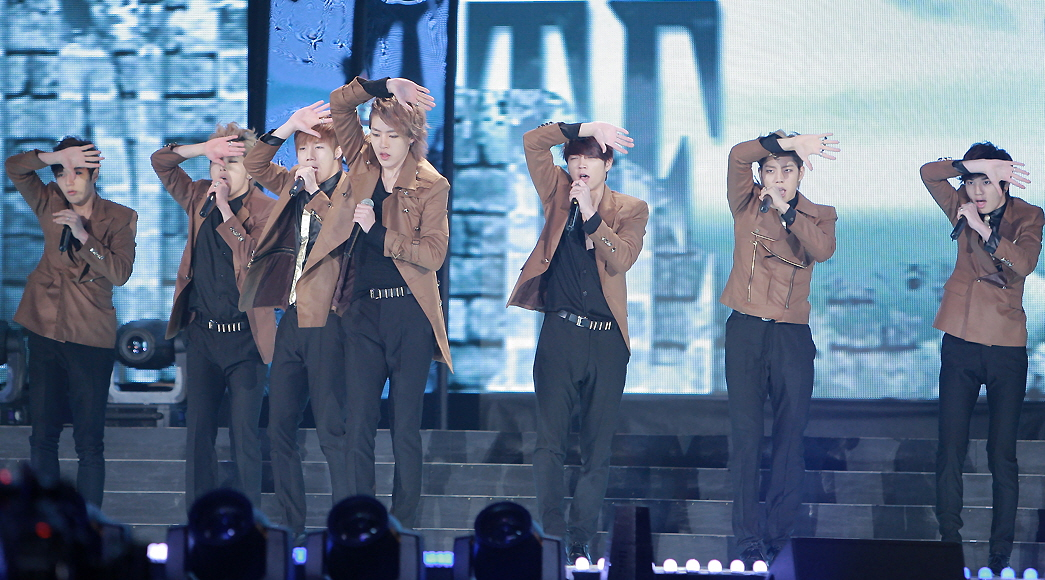
Infinite, (2013)

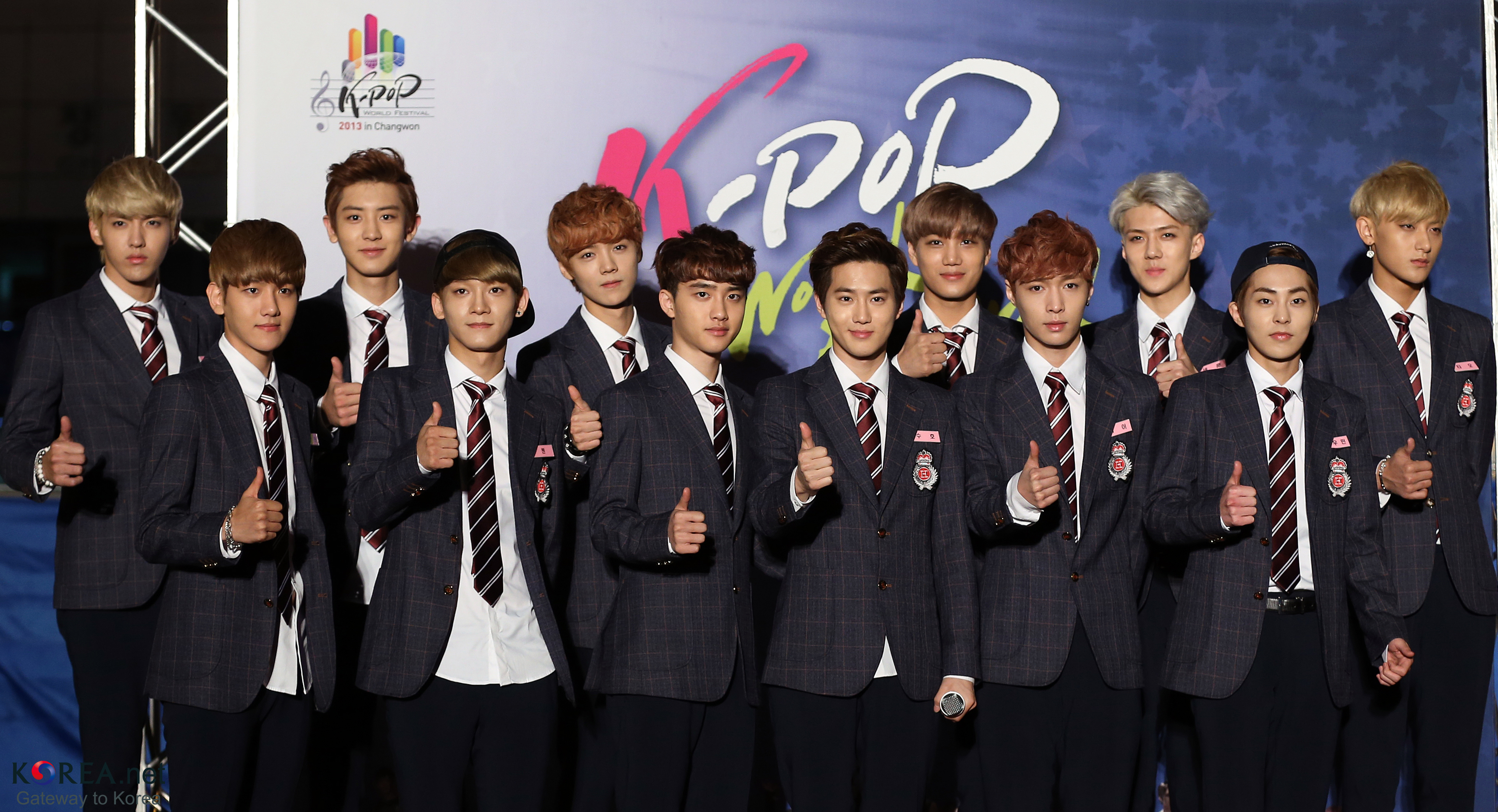
Exo, (2014–16)

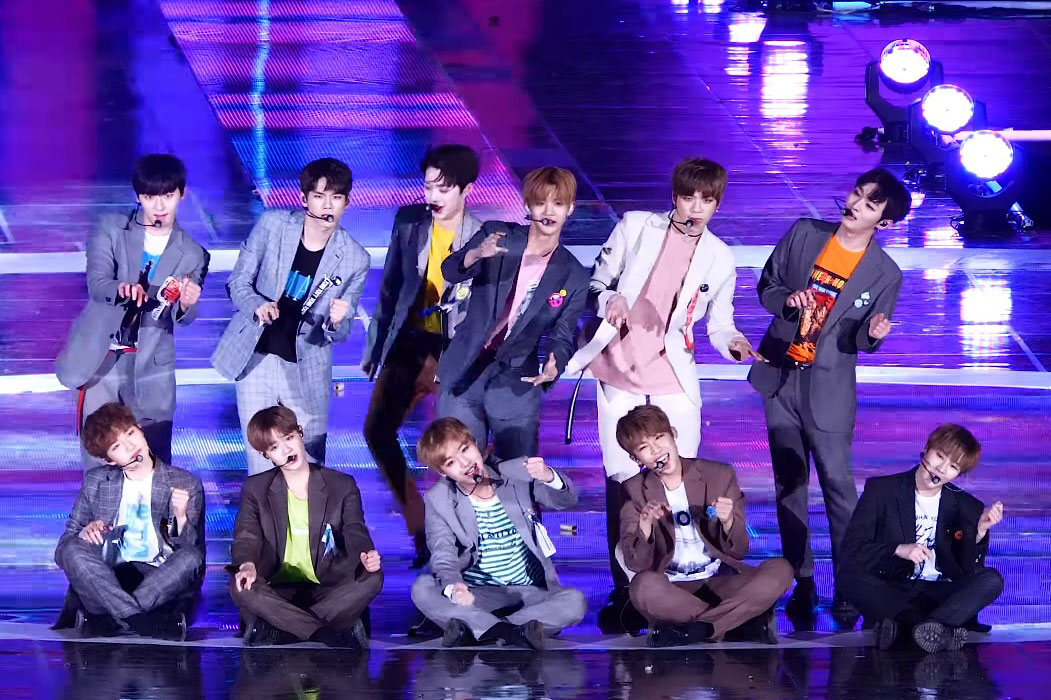
Wanna One, (2017–18)

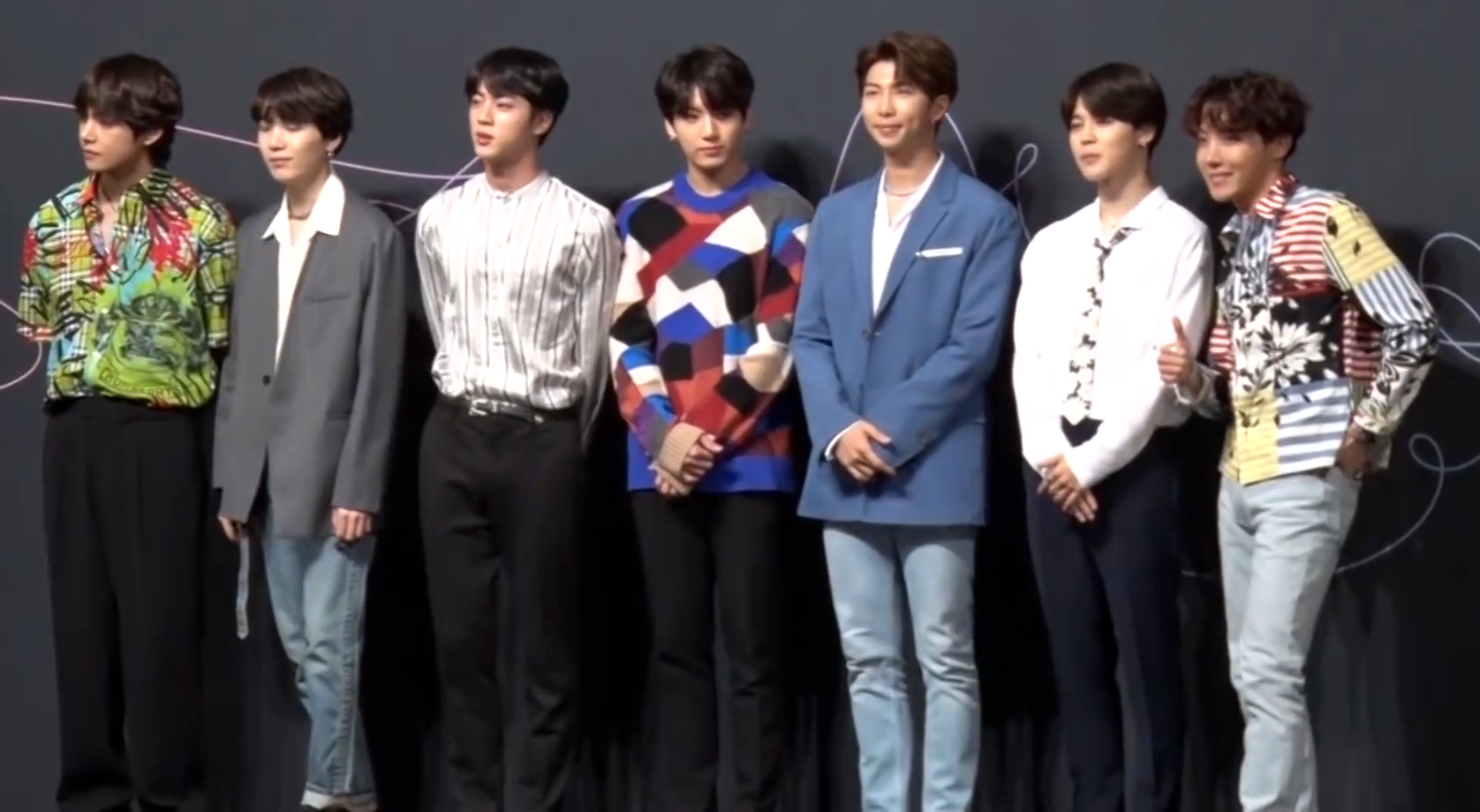
BTS, (2019–22)

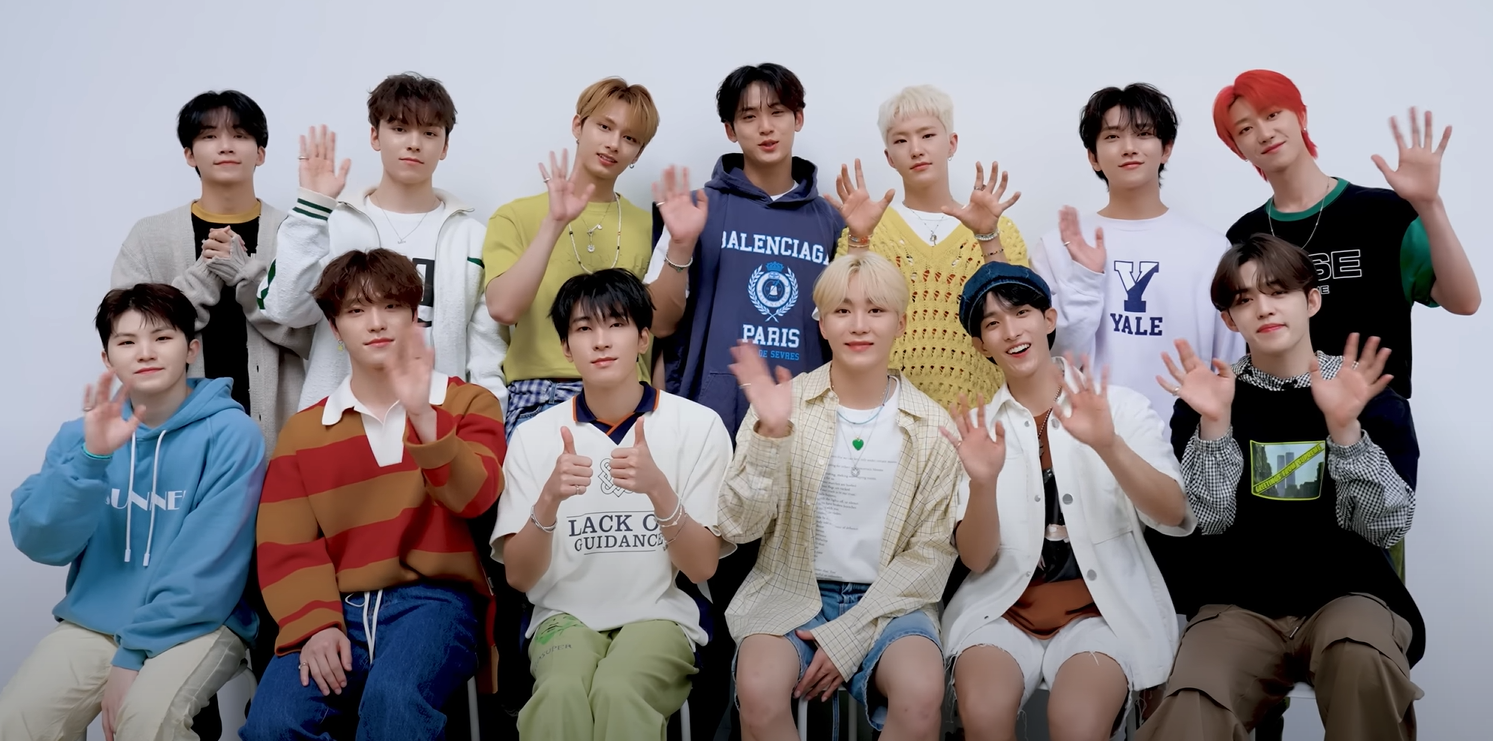
Seventeen, (2023–2025)

=== 1990s ===
Year	Winner	Work	Nominees
1999	H.O.T. (Note: Titled as "Best Group")	"I Yah!"	Shinhwa – T.O.P; S.E.S.^{♀} – "I Love You" (너를 사랑해); Sechs Kies – "Ye Gam" (예감); Fin.K.L^{♀} – "Forever Love" (영원한 사랑)

=== 2000s ===
Year	Winner	Work	Nominees
2000	g.o.d	"Love and Memory"	DJ DOC – "Run To You"; H.O.T. – "Outside Castle"; Clon – "Choryeon" (초련); Turbo – "Tonight"
2001	Shinhwa	"Wild Eyes"	UN – "Pado" (파도); Jinusean- "A-Yo"; g.o.d – "Lies" (거짓말); Click-B – "Undefeatable" (백전무패)
2002	Shinhwa	"Perfect Man"	J-Walk – "Suddenly"; jtL – "A Better Day"; g.o.d – "Road" (길); Click-B – "To Be Continued"
2003	Shinhwa	"Your Wedding"	g.o.d – "Letter" (편지); S – "I Swear"; N.R.G – "Hit Song"; jtL – "Without Your Love"
2004	Shinhwa	"Angel"	DJ DOC – "One Night"; NRG – "Hurray For A Virile Son Of Korea" (대한건아만세); MC the Max – "Love Poem" (사랑의시); 1TYM – "Hot"
2005	SG Wannabe	"Crime and Punishment"	TVXQ – "Rising Sun"; Buzz – "Coward" (겁쟁이); MC the Max – "Don't Be Happy" (행복하지 말아요); g.o.d – "An Ordinary Day" (보통날)
2006	TVXQ	"'O'-Jung.Ban.Hap."	SS501 – "Snow Prince"; Buzz – "You Don't Know Man"; Shinhwa – "Once In A Lifetime"; SG Wannabe – "Partner For Life"
2007	BigBang	"Lies"	Super Junior – "Don't Don"; Epik High – "Fan"; SG Wannabe – "Arirang"; SS501 – "4Chance"
2008	BigBang	"Haru Haru"	TVXQ – "Mirotic"; Epik High – "One" (ft. Ji Sun); F.T. Island – "After Love"; SG Wannabe – "La La La"
2009	2PM	—N/a	BigBang; Super Junior; SG Wannabe; SS501

=== 2010s ===
Year	Winner	Nominees
2010	2PM	2AM; Beast; MBLAQ; Super Junior
2011	Super Junior	2PM; Beast; BigBang; TVXQ
2012	BigBang	TVXQ; Beast; Super Junior; Shinhwa
2013	Infinite	Exo; Shinee; Shinhwa; Teen Top
2014	Exo	B1A4; Block B; Beast; Super Junior
2015	Exo	BigBang; BTS; Shinee; Super Junior; Shinhwa
2016	Exo	BTS; Block B; Shinee; Infinite; iKon
2017	Wanna One	Exo; BTS; Seventeen; Got7; Nu'est W
2018	Wanna One	BTS; Seventeen; Got7; NU'EST W; NCT 127
2019	BTS	Exo; Got7; NCT 127; Monsta X; Seventeen

=== 2020s ===
Year	Winner	Nominees	Ref.
2020	BTS	Exo; Got7; NCT; Monsta X; Seventeen	
2021	BTS	NCT 127; NCT Dream; Seventeen; Stray Kids; Tomorrow X Together	
2022	BTS	Enhypen; NCT Dream; Seventeen; Stray Kids; Tomorrow X Together	
2023	Seventeen	Exo; NCT Dream; Stray Kids; Tomorrow X Together; Treasure	
2024	Seventeen	Enhypen; NCT 127; Riize; Stray Kids; TWS; Zerobaseone	
2025	Seventeen	Enhypen; Riize; Stray Kids; Tomorrow X Together; Zerobaseone	

== Multiple awards ==
4 wins

- BTS
- Shinhwa

3 wins

- BigBang
- Exo
- Seventeen

2 wins

- 2PM
- Wanna One
