= Candy (H.O.T. song) =

1996 single by H.O.T.

Single by H.O.T.

from the album We Hate All Kinds of Violence
- Language: Korean
- Released: September 7, 1996
- Recorded: 1996
- Genre: K-pop; dance-pop; bubblegum pop
- Length: 3:37
- Label: SM
- Songwriter: Jang Yong-jin
- Producer: Jang Yong-jin

H.O.T. singles chronology
"Warrior's Descendant" (1996)	"Candy" (1996)	"Wolf and Sheep" (1997)

Music video
- "Candy" on YouTube

"Candy" (Korean: 캔디) is a song recorded by South Korean boy group H.O.T., released as part of the group's debut studio album We Hate All Kinds of Violence through SM Entertainment on September 7, 1996. Along with "Warrior's Descendant", it serves as one of the two singles from the record. "Candy" is a "cheerful" bubblegum pop dance number, and was written and produced by Jang Yong-jin.

Upon the album's release, "Candy" was met with widespread recognition in South Korea and has been credited with sparking a new wave of mainstream music in the country's youth. H.O.T. promoted "Candy" with televised live performances on weekly South Korean music programs in late 1996 and January 1997, and topped the chart rankings for several weeks. In a 2005 survey conducted by MTV Korea, it was voted the most popular song of 1996 in South Korea by netizens.

== Background ==
"Candy" – H.O.T.
A 23-second sample of "Candy", a cheerful and energetic bubblegum pop track.

H.O.T. made its debut on September 7, 1996, with the release of the album We Hate All Kinds of Violence. It experienced instant commercial success in South Korea and has since reportedly sold over 1.5 million copies. The trainee system laid by SM with H.O.T. has led them to be considered the first idol group in K-pop.

=== Release ===
"Candy" serves as the second single from the album following "Warrior's Descent". It is a cheerful bubblegum pop song that established the group's popularity in South Korea. The fashion, rap skills and dance moves shown through "Candy" has been noted by popular cultural commentators for sparking a new wave of mainstream music in South Korea.

== Live performances ==
Following promotions for the first single "Descent of Warriors", H.O.T. began promoting the album's second single, "Candy", on televised weekly music programs in November 1996. The stages for "Candy" exemplifies the level of coordination regarding idol costumes, with each member wearing a designated color and accessorized with face paint, fuzzy oversized mittens, visors, bucket hats, and earmuffs, and used stuffed animals, backpacks, and messenger bags as props. On October 13 and 14, 2018, H.O.T. performed "Candy" at their reunion concert "Forever [Highfive Of Teenagers]" at the Seoul Olympic Stadium, which attracted a total of 100,000 attendees.

== Accolades ==
"Candy" won the Best New Artist award at the 11th Golden Disc Awards. It achieved the top position on SBS's TV Gayo 20 (former version of Inkigayo), MBC's Popular Songs Best 50 (former version of Show! Music Core), and KBS's Top 10 Songs (former version of Music Bank).

Music program awards
Program	Date	Ref.
TV Gayo 20	December 15, 1996	
TV Gayo 20	December 22, 1996	
TV Gayo 20	January 5, 1997	
TV Gayo 20	January 12, 1997	
TV Gayo 20	January 19, 1997	
Popular Songs Best 50	December 28, 1996	
Popular Songs Best 50	January 4, 1997	
Popular Songs Best 50	January 11, 1997	
Top 10 Songs	January 8, 1997	
Top 10 Songs	January 15, 1997	

== Impact and legacy ==
The release of "Candy" presented a softer and gentler form of pop music with upbeat and cheerful melodies accompanied by energetic dance moves—a formula adopted by many subsequent Korean idol groups. Ranking it as the best K-pop song of all time in 2012, David Bevan of Spin magazine wrote "Seo Taiji may have laid K-pop's foundation a few years earlier, but it was H.O.T., a boy band engineered in part by SM kingpin Lee Soo-Man, that ushered in the 'idol' cult that's propelled Korean pop cultural product as far and wide as it's come in the past ten years." In 2014, Mnet included "Candy" in their countdown list of Legend 100 Songs, a list of 100 influential songs in Korean popular music history since the 1960s.

That same year, music webzine Music Taste Y ranked it at number 25 in their list of 120 greatest dance songs of all time, where critic Kim Yun-ha noted the multi use marketing that commercializes not only music, but also fashion and characters, and said that the song acts as sort of the ancestor of all those combined elements that the K-pop industry has become accustomed to in the present. 35 music and pop culture critics organized by Seoul Shinmun and Melon ranked "Candy" at number 17 in a 2021 list of the 100 best K-pop songs of all time; critic Jeong Byeong-wook echoed that its beats, "dances, related fashions, various derivatives, and the fandom culture that surrounds it have all become pioneering models of the K-pop business today."

H.O.T.'s "Candy" on select rankings
Publisher	Rank	Rank	Year published
MTV Korea	Most popular songs from 1996	1	2005
Gallup Korea	100 All Time Favorite Korean Songs	13	2006
JukeOn	List of hit dances of all time in the music industry	No order	2007
Spin	21 Greatest K-pop Songs of All Time	1	2012
Mnet	Legend 100 Songs	No order	2014
Music Y	120 greatest dance tracks of all time	25	2014
The Dong-A Ilbo	Best male idol songs according to experts	2	2016
Melon	Top 100 K-pop Songs of All Time	17	2021
Rolling Stone	100 Greatest Songs in the History of Korean Pop Music	2	2023

== NCT Dream version ==
"Candy"

Single by NCT Dream

from the EP Candy
- Released: December 16, 2022
- Recorded: 2022
- Genre: K-pop
- Length: 3:37
- Label: SM
- Songwriter: Jang Yong-jin

NCT Dream singles chronology
"Beatbox" (2022)	"Candy" (2022)	"Best Friend Ever" (2023)

NCT singles chronology
"2 Baddies" (2022)	"Candy" (2022)	"Phantom" (2022)

Music video
- "Candy" on YouTube

South Korean boy group NCT Dream released another version of "Candy" on December 16, 2022. It served as the lead single for their extended play of the same name. Featured on a commercial, the song debuted at number seven on the Circle Digital Chart.

=== Release and promotion ===
On November 18, 2022, NCT Dream announced that they would re-record "Candy" and release it as the lead single for their Christmas-themed extended play of the same name. Before its release, the song was featured in a Kookmin Bank's commercial starring the group. A portion of the song was featured in promotional videos released via YouTube Shorts. A teaser for the music video was released on December 14. The song was released on December 16, 2022, alongside an accompanying music video, showing the members seize a candy factory and celebrating Christmas. NCT Dream performed the song at the 2022 KBS Song Festival on the same day of release. They performed the song alongside the b-side "Graduation" on South Korean music show Show! Music Core on December 17.

=== Chart performance ===
"Candy" debuted at number seven on the Circle Digital Chart in the issue dated December 11 to 17, 2022, and peaked at number three the next week. The song peaked at number 63 on the Billboard Japan Hot 100 in the chart issue dated December 28, 2022. It peaked at number 198 on the Billboard Global 200 in the chart issue dated December 31, 2022.

=== Accolades ===
Music program awards
Program	Date	Ref.
M Countdown	December 29, 2022	
Music Bank	December 30, 2022	

=== Credits and personnel ===
Credits adapted from album's liner notes.

==== Studio ====
- SM Ssam Studio – recording
- SM Starlight Studio – recording, digital editing
- SM Blue Cup Studio – recording, mixing, digital editing
- SM Yellow Tail Studio – digital editing
- Doobdoob Studio – digital editing
- 821 Sound Mastering – mastering

==== Personnel ====
- SM Entertainment – executive producer
- Lee Sung-soo – production director, executive supervisor
- Tak Young-jun – executive supervisor
- Yoo Young-jin – music and sound supervisor
- NCT Dream – vocals
  - Renjun – background vocals
  - Haechan – background vocals
  - Chenle – background vocals
- Kwon Ae-jin – background vocals
- Jang Yong-jin – lyrics, composition
- Kenzie – arrangement, piano, vocal directing
- Kim Yoo-hyun – guitar
- Kang Eun-ji – recording
- Jeong Yu-ra – recording, digital editing
- Jung Eui-seok – recording, mixing, digital editing
- Noh Min-ji – digital editing
- Jung Woo-young – digital editing
- Kwon Nam-woo – mastering

=== Charts ===
Weekly charts
Chart (2022–2023)	Peak position
Global 200 (Billboard)	198
Indonesia (Billboard)	10
Japan (Japan Hot 100)	63
New Zealand Hot Singles (RMNZ)	40
Singapore Regional (RIAS)	15
South Korea (Circle)	3
Vietnam (Vietnam Hot 100)	35

Monthly charts
Chart (2023)	Peak position
South Korea (Circle)	6

Year-end charts
Chart (2023)	Position
South Korea (Circle)	25
