= Kim Sung-jae =

South Korean singer and performer

- Born: Kim Sung-jae; April 18, 1972; Seoul, South Korea
- Died: November 20, 1995 (aged 23) Seoul, South Korea
- Genres: K-pop, Korean hip hop
- Occupations: Singer; rapper; dancer
- Years active: 1993–1995
- Formerly of: Deux

- Kim Sung-jae
- Hangul: 김성재
- RR: Gim Seongjae
- MR: Kim Sŏngjae

Kim Sung-jae (Korean: 김성재; April 18, 1972 – November 20, 1995) was a South Korean singer, rapper and dancer. He was best known as a member of Deux, an influential early K-pop and Korean hip hop group that gained fame in the early 1990s.

On November 20, 1995, Kim was found dead in a hotel room under suspicious circumstances at the age of 23. His girlfriend, identified only as Miss Kim, was convicted of his murder and sentenced to life in prison but was later acquitted on appeal. In 2019, his girlfriend filed multiple injunctions to block SBS's investigative program I Want to Know from airing an episode covering his death.

== Death ==
Several months after Deux disbanded, Kim released his debut solo album, As I Told You, on November 19, 1995. He performed the album's title track the same day on an SBS music program and later returned to his hotel room with his girlfriend and members of his entourage. The following morning, he was found dead in his hotel room. Initial police reports attributed his death to a myocardial infarction (heart attack) caused by karoshi (overwork). However, an autopsy later revealed 28 needle marks on his right arm and traces of an animal anesthetic in his system.

Kim's girlfriend was arrested, convicted of his murder, and sentenced to life in prison. However, she was later acquitted on appeal due to "lack of evidence."

== Aftermath ==
In 2019, Kim's ex girlfriend filed multiple injunctions to prevent SBS from airing an episode of the investigative program I Want to Know that examined his death.

On September 7, 2022, a virtual avatar of Kim was unveiled by Persona Space and Galaxy Corporation. The avatar performed "As I Told You" during an event attended by Kim's mother and brother.

== Discography ==
=== Solo album ===
Title	Details	Peak chart positions	Sales
Title	Details	KOR	Sales
김성재 (Kim Sung-jae)	Released: November 19, 1995; Label: Beyond Music; Formats: CD, cassette; Track listing: Intro 0:59; 말하자면 (As I Told You) 3:35 Title Track; 마지막 노래를 들어줘 3:53; 작지만 큰 행복 3:41; 더 이상은 3:17; 너의 생일 3:31; 도전! 3:13; Let's Dance 3:28; 봄을 기다리며 3:33; 염세주의자 3:17; Hip Hop 정신 (精神) (Feat. 이현도) 5:07	—	
"—" denotes releases that did not chart or were not released in that region.

== See also ==
- Deux
