= Tony An =

South Korean singer-songwriter (born 1978)

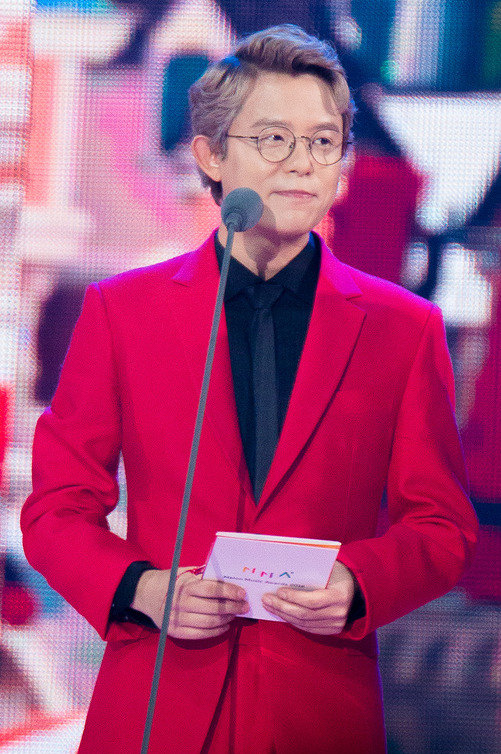
- An in 2016

Background information
- Also known as: Tony An
- Born: Ahn Seung-ho; June 7, 1978 (age 48); Ichon-dong, Yongsan District, Seoul, South Korea
- Genres: K-pop; R&B; dance
- Occupations: Singer; songwriter; businessman
- Years active: 1996–present
- Labels: TN Nation Entertainment; SM Entertainment
- Formerly of: SMTOWN; H.O.T.; jtL
- Website: tonyan.co.kr

Korean name
- Hangul: 안승호
- Hanja: 安勝浩
- RR: An Seungho
- MR: An Sŭngho

Ahn Seung-ho (Korean: 안승호; born June 7, 1978), better known as Tony An (Korean: 토니안), is a South Korean singer-songwriter, best known as a member of boy band H.O.T. After H.O.T. disbanded in 2001, its ex-members Tony An, Jang Woo-hyuk and Lee Jae-won formed the dance music trio jtL. Eventually, JTL unofficially disbanded as each member, including An, released their solo material.

== Biography ==
He is the CEO of TN Nation Entertainment, a music entertainment company; Skoolooks, a school uniform company; and Shinenihs, an undergarment company. Popular comedians Jung Hyung-don and Jo Hye-ryun were both part of TN Nation Entertainment.

In 1997, An was admitted to Dongguk University. He majored in stage performance and graduated in 2003.

== Career ==
=== Solo ===
An changed his genre to fast-paced soft rock songs and gave a speech, telling about his views on his former H.O.T. members, and how he tried to contact them. He also released a music video title "Melody" featuring SAT from his special album, "Untold Story".

On April 28, 2008, An came back with a new special album entitled "Look Blank", with its principal song "Wallet". In September 2010, An completed his 2-year army duty and released a new song, "Going To Meet You Now". He released an EP titled 'Top Star' in February 2011, and after leaving as MC for the popular No. 1 Kpop chart show Mcountdown! in 2012 he released a single called "Beautiful girl" which also features Hyun Jun of SMASH.

=== jtL ===
When JTL was created, An was the lead vocal for the group and not just a back-up vocal and English rapper. H.O.T. fans had mixed feelings for jtL. Many of jtL's music videos were boycotted. However, things changed around when jtL held a 'Guerilla Concert' in front of 12,133 fans.

=== TN Nation Entertainment ===
After An wanted to pursue a solo career during his jtL days, he created his own label, TN Nation Entertainment. Artists under this label are An and former Click-B member Yoo Ho-suk, going under the name "Evan", along with Jung Ju-ri, Shin Bong-sun, 어썸베이비 (Awe5omeBaby), and others. South Korean comedian and entertainer Jung Hyung-don was the member of this company.

TN Nation Entertainment also debuted a boy band named SMASH, who released a music video for their debut song, "비상[Emergency]", on August 14, 2008. An collaborated with SMASH in February 2012 with 'Get Your Swag On'. They promoted the song together on various live music shows. SMASH later disbanded at the end of 2014.

On June 19, 2015, the company debuted their first girl group, a five-member beatpella (beatbox + a cappella) group called 어썸베이비 (literally Awesome Baby, stylized as Awe5omeBaby). The members include June, Sumin, Yechan, Dahee, and Lina. Their debut single was '내가 왜?' or 'Why Should I?'.

== Personal life ==
In November 2013, An was investigated for illegal online sports gambling alongside South Korean comedian Lee Soo Geun and South Korean entertainer Tak Jae-hoon. Reportedly, he gambled a total of 400,000,000 KRW (approximately $376,000 USD) between May 2009 and March 2012. He had his first hearing on December 6 and received a six-month prison sentence with one year probation on December 27.

On February 13, 2014, in light of An's illegal gambling incident, KBS revealed they had imposed a ban on all of H.O.T.'s songs and prevented his show appearances on their media outlets while MBC simultaneously announced a temporary ban on An's show appearances on their channels as well. As of 2016, all the major stations lifted the ban on An.

An is currently housemates with Sechs Kies's member Kim Jae-duck. The arrangement had caused a stir amongst their contemporaries as both groups were regarded as one another's fiercest industry rivals during the late 1990s and largely avoided any contact with one another despite crossing paths many times. They had met and befriended one another during their mandatory military service.

== Filmography ==
=== Film ===
Year	Title	Role	Notes	Ref.
2022	Reverse		Cameo; sound film	

=== Television series ===
Year	Title	Role	Notes
2003	Hello Franceska	Tony	Cameo ep. 2
2012	Reply 1997	Himself	Cameo ep. 1 & 3
2019	How to Hate You?		Cameo ep. 2
2019	Melting Me Softly	Himself	Cameo ep. 1
2020	Hanging On	Dr. Ahn Jung-seop	Cameo ep. 4 & 6
2021	The Second Husband	a producer	Cameo ep.2
2021	Fly Again	Yoo Min-hyuk	
2023	Oh! Youngsim	Lee Woo-sang	

=== Variety show ===
Year	Title	Role
2000–2002	Star Survival Dongeodongrak	Cast Member
2010	Running Man - Episode 15	Guest
2010–2011	Oh! My School	Host
2011–2012	M Countdown	Main Host
2013	MasterChef Korea Celebrity	Contestant
2013	Handsome Boys of the 20th Century	Cast Member
2016	Attraction TV	Cast Member
2016–2018, 2022	My Little Old Boy	Cast Member
2016–2017	Lipstick Prince	Cast Member
2017	Raid the Convenience Store	Cast Member
2018	Plan Man 3	Main Host
2018	Mimi Shop	Main Host
2019	Go Together, Travel Alone	Cast Member
2019	Escape Idols	Cast Member
2020	Idol Fishing Camp	Cast Member
2020	Top 10 Student	Cast Member
2021–Present	Boss in the Mirror	Cast Member

== Discography ==
=== Studio albums ===
Title	Album details	Peak chart positions	Sales
Title	Album details	KOR (RIAK)	Sales
Believe	Released: October 19, 2004; Label: TN Entertainment; Format: CD, cassette	8	KOR: 49,369
Yutzpracachia's Love	Released: April 14, 2006; Label: TN Entertainment; Format: CD	3	KOR: 21,488

=== Extended plays ===
Title	Album details	Peak chart positions		Sales
Title	Album details	KOR (RIAK)	KOR (Circle)	Sales
Behind The Clouds (촌스럽게)	Released: November 29, 2005; Label: TN Entertainment; Format: CD	13	—	KOR: 16,448
Untold Story	Released: May 29, 2007; Label: Nega Network; Format: CD	5	—	KOR: 12,094
Top Star	Released: April 4, 2011; Label: TN Entertainment; Format: CD, digital download	N/A	—	
I'm Tony An	Released: July 3, 2013; Label: TN Entertainment; Format: CD, digital download	N/A	9	KOR: 2,932
"—" denotes release did not chart.
