= KMTV Asia =

South Korean television channel

- Country: South Korea / Singapore

Programming
- Language(s): Korean (With English / Chinese / Thai subtitles)
- Picture format: 1080i HDTV

Ownership
- Owner: NAMU & MEDIA

Links
- Website: http://www.kmtv.asia

KMTV Asia is a South Korean television channel that launched in 2008, broadcasting a variety of Korean entertainment, including music videos, variety shows, dramas, and movies, with 24-hour programming.

The channel is available on cable, IPTV, and satellite networks in Hong Kong, Singapore, Taiwan, and Thailand, operating at a satellite position of 138.0°E with a frequency of 12,380 MHz, utilizing DVB-S2 technology and MPEG-4 HD encoding. Owned by KMTV Co., Ltd., KMTV Asia features popular programs such as "Vampire Idol," "The Great Catsby," and music series like "Show Champion," while also showcasing live performances from top K-Pop artists. The channel plays a significant role in promoting K-Pop and Korean culture internationally, engaging with fans through its diverse programming and online presence.

== Highlight Programmes ==
- A Pink News Season 1, 2, 3
- HaHa & Friends
- Hidden Singer (JTBC)
- Show Champion (MBC Music)
- The Beauty's Taming the Idol Stars / Raising Idols
- The SHOW: All New K-POP (SBS MTV)
- The Strongest Couple / The Best Couple
- Vampire Idol (MBN)

== In-house Programmes ==
- Idol Battle
- KMTV Collection
- KMTV K-POP Style
- KMTV Music Highway
- KMTV Music Star News
- KMTV Olleh Music Chart Top 100
- Sing Along K-POP
- U & Music
- Weekly Ballad Chart
- Weekly Dance Chart
- Weekly Hip-Hop Chart
- Weekly Super K-POP
