= Jang Woo-hyuk =

South Korean singer and rapper (born 1978)

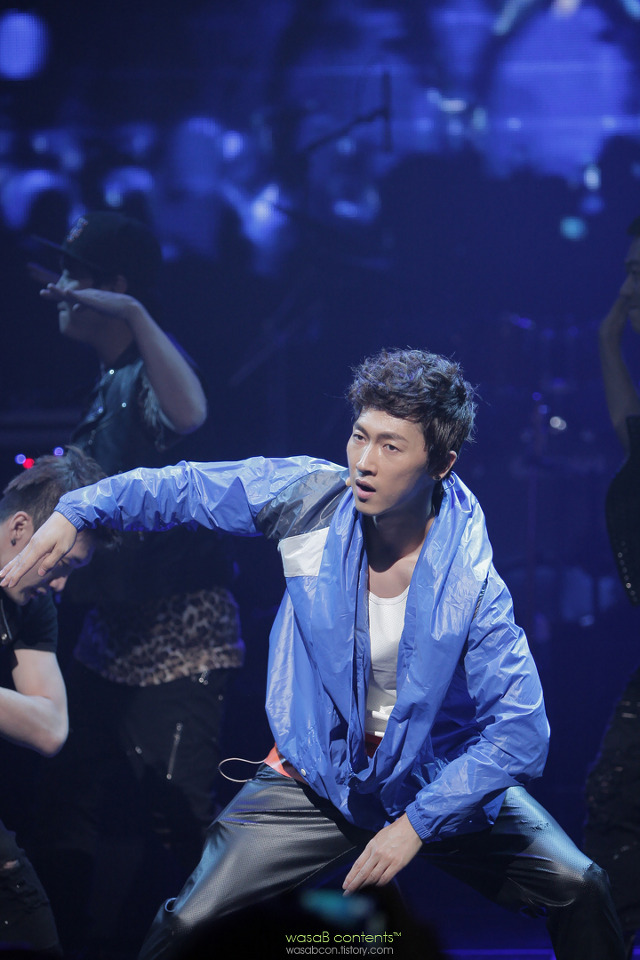
- Jang in 2014

Background information
- Born: May 8, 1978 (age 48); Daegu, South Korea
- Genres: K-pop; dance; hip hop
- Occupations: Singer; rapper; choreographer; dancer
- Years active: 1996–present
- Formerly of: H.O.T.; jtL
- Website: Official website

Korean name
- Hangul: 장우혁
- Hanja: 張佑赫
- RR: Jang Uhyeok
- MR: Chang Uhyŏk

Jang Woo-hyuk (Korean: 장우혁; Hanja: 張佑赫; born May 8, 1978) is a South Korean singer and rapper. He debuted in 1996 as a member of the best-selling K-pop boy band H.O.T. After the band broke up due to a contract dispute, Jang and two other former members formed the boy band jtL, which was active from 2001 to 2003. Jang also released two full-length albums and two extended plays as a solo artist. He is the founder of talent agency WH Entertainment.

== H.O.T. ==
As a member of H.O.T., he was known as the group's dancer and for his strong vocal screams in his rap. His nicknames have been "Hammer Boy" for his famous hammer dance from H.O.T.s debut single; Candy. Another of his well-known nicknames was "Tough Guy". When H.O.T disbanded in 2001, Woo Hyuk, Tony An, and Lee Jaewon dropped out of SM and formed jtL.

== JTL ==
When JTL was created, H.O.T. fans had mixed feelings for JTL. Many of JTL's music videos were boycotted and their performance was hindered by the ex-agency SM Entertainment. However, things changed around when JTL held a 'Guerilla Concert' in front of 12,000 fans.

== Solo ==
JTL unofficially disbanded in 2003 as its members began pursuing solo careers. Woo Hyuk became the CEO of Newest Entertainment (a dancing academy). Woo Hyuk collaborated with Kenzie, Pang Shi Hyuk, and many other talented K-pop musicians. Music lovers thirsting for groovy R&B style beats plus a flair of hip hop all blended with Woo Hyuk's inimitable vocals are well advised to check out the release of No More Drama. To prepare for his solo album, Jang Woo Hyuk underwent 10 months of dance training.

Jang Woo Hyuk has become popular in the Chinese and Taiwanese markets. In a poll held on China's largest portal site, sina.com, Woo Hyuk topped two categories, beating out Rain by 500 votes in the poll: "Who do you think is the most popular South Korean singer in China?" and more than double the votes in dancing. He has expressed his deep interest in making appearances in China and Taiwan. During the beginning of April 2006, he started his first promotion in China and finally created his official fan club in China; however, he has never held a concert in Taiwan.

On December 18, 2009, Jang Woo-Hyuk finished his military service. After his exit, he had a short press conference and said "The biggest difference is my weight. Compared to myself from beginning of the military service, I had lost 14–15 kilograms [c. 30 lb]. Right before I started my military service, I had gained lots of weight." About 50 fans were also present during the press conference. He said to the fans, "I was surprised by the number of fans who came to see me. I will soon come back with an improved version of myself." In 2010 Jang Woo Hyuk signed a contract to sing in China. It is said that he might be rejoining H.O.T.

His new album released May 25 entitled " I am The Future ", with singles including Time is [L]over, I am the Future, and Minimalism.

On May 28, Jang Woo Hyuk made his live comeback with the single " Time Is [L]over " on Strong Heart. The song garnered interests from netizens, commenting on the videos praising him saying " If I saw him walking in the streets, I would have never thought he was 33, " and " He is a very good dancer, Eunhyuk was inspired by him, that's why they both are very good."

In July 2011, Jang Woo came out with a new single: Weekend Night.

On November 17, 2022, WH Creative announced that Jang would hold a Winter Story 'From echo' fan meeting, which would take place both online and offline on December 17.

== Discography ==
=== Studio albums ===
Title	Album details	Peak chart positions	Sales
Title	Album details	KOR	Sales
No More Drama	Released: September 12, 2005; Labels: Sponge Entertainment, Sony BMG; Track listing: 1. Flip Reverse; 2. Pump Flow; 3. 지지 않는 태양 (feat. Esther); 4. Shake it Shake it 5. Sorry; 6. Skip; 7. Red Sun; 8. Scream; 9. Let's Go; 10. F.A.S.T Love; 11. Square Boy; 12. One Step	8	KOR: 51,956+
My Way	Released: October 24, 2006; Labels: Sponge Entertainment, Sony BMG; Track listing: 1. Mr. 잭슨 (feat. Nam Hun, Park Jang-geum of Super Sta); 2. 진짜 남자 (feat. Yang Jeong-eun); 3. Sunny (feat. J); 4. One Way (feat. Esther); 5. 마지막 잎새 (feat. Choi Jung-in, Rado); 6. 노란 샤쓰의 사나이 (feat. Tak Jae-hoon); 7. S Scenario (feat. Yuri); 8. oH, No! (feat. Ki-sang); 9. Last Game (feat. Nam Hun, Park Jang-geum of Super Sta, Supacool, Esther, Cee-Jay, Shinsadong Tiger, Rado, JnG Beat)	5	KOR: 28,879

=== Extended plays ===
Title	Album details	Peak chart positions	Sales (DL)
Title	Album details	KOR	Sales (DL)
I Am the Future	Released: May 25, 2011; Labels: WH Entertainment, Universal Music; Track listing: 1. Minimalism; 2. I Am The Future (feat. Seo Jung Hwan & Jo Eun Hee); 3. Time Is [L]over; 4. Weekend Night; 5. [W] Time (feat. J'Kyun); 6. Time Is [L]over (Inst.); 7. Weekend Night (Inst.)	12	KOR: 5,214+
Back to the Memories	Released: November 18, 2011; Labels: WH Entertainment, Universal Music; Track listing: 1. 불꽃놀이 (feat. Dasona); 2. Don't Go (feat. Ben); 3. Back to the memories (feat. Jo Hyun-ah of Urban Zakapa); 4. 일기장 (feat. Nusoul)	9	KOR: 3,448+

=== Single albums ===
Title	Album Details	Peak chart positions	Sales
Title	Album Details	KOR	Sales
Flare	Released: November 18, 2025; Label: WH Creative; Formats: Digital download, streaming	44	KOR: 1,681

=== Singles ===
Title	Year	Peak chart positions	Sales (DL)	Album
Title	Year	KOR	Sales (DL)	Album
Korean
"Rain Man" feat. Kang Hyeon-jeong of Bubble Sisters	2010	39	—N/a	A Man Called God OST Part 1
"Weekend Night" (Electro Remix)	2011	70	—N/a	Weekend Night remix single album
Chinese
"Don't Go" (Secret Angel Edit)	2012	—	—N/a	Secret Angel OST
"—" denotes releases that did not chart or were not released in that region.

== Filmography ==
- Filial Son's Village (2022) - Cast Member
- Love in the Office (2015)
- The Secret Angel (2012)

== Awards and nominations ==
=== Mnet Asian Music Awards ===
Year	Category	Work	Result	Ref.
2005	Best Dance Performance	"Sun That Never Sets" (지지 않는 태양)	Nominated	
2011	Best Dance Performance – Solo	"Time is (L)over"	Nominated	
