= Lee Jae-won (singer) =

South Korean singer (born 1980)

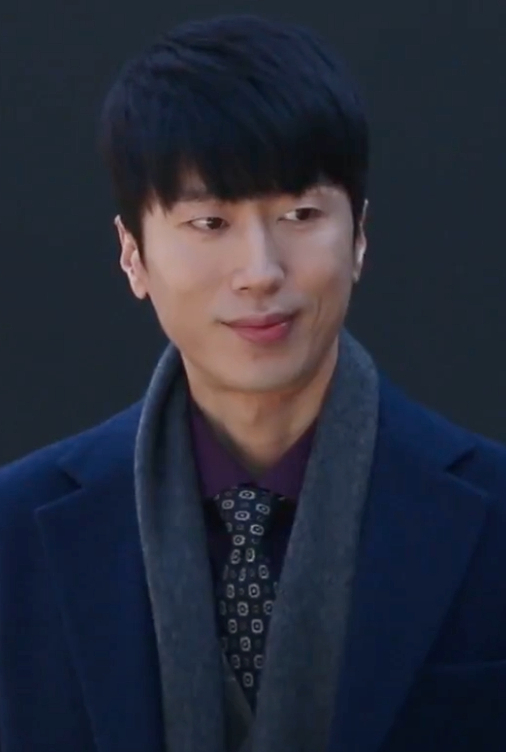
- Lee in 2017

Background information
- Born: 5 April 1980 (age 46); Gangdong-gu, Seoul, South Korea
- Genres: K-pop; hip-hop
- Occupations: Singer; rapper; DJ
- Years active: 1996–present
- Label: T.I. Story
- Formerly of: H.O.T.; jtL

- Lee Jae-won
- Hangul: 이재원
- Hanja: 李在元
- RR: I Jaewon
- MR: I Chaewŏn

Lee Jae-won (Korean: 이재원; Hanja: 李在元; born 5 April 1980) is a South Korean singer, rapper and DJ. He is the former member of Korean groups H.O.T. and jtL.

== Career ==
=== Solo ===
In 2005, Lee released his first solo album, No Pain, No Gain. The album received disappointing sales. In 2007, he released his second album, Lee Jae Won Vol. 1.5. A part of the single "I'm So Hot" samples a rhythm from Mariah Carey's It's Like That. Again the album received disappointing sales. In 2008, he was accused of rape and arrested. The charges were dropped 3 hours later, but because of the event, he was unable to release his next album. In 2012, Jae Won released his new album in Chinese language titled It's the Time. It's received a positive response from fans in China. During his comeback performance, it was speculated that he planned to bring back the H.O.T. group to make a new album.

=== Military service ===
In 2009, Lee enlisted for his compulsory military service, where he served for 22 months at the Ministry of National Defense in Yongsan-gu, Seoul. He was discharged on 7 March 2011.

== Personal life ==
On 10 January 2015, Lee's representatives announced that the singer was diagnosed with thyroid cancer in April of the previous year.

== Discography ==
=== Studio albums ===
Title	Album details	Peak chart positions	Sales
Title	Album details	KOR (RIAK)	Sales
No Pain No Gain	Released: 4 April 2005; Label: iPim Entertainment; Format: CD, cassette	4	KOR: 26,519
Jaewon	Released: 7 May 2007; Label: iPim Entertainment; Format: CD	9	KOR: 6,495

== Filmography ==
=== Television series ===
Year	Title	Role
2014	My Spring Days	Park Hyung-woo
