= List of awards and nominations received by g.o.d =

g.o.d awards and nominations
Awards and nominations
Award	Wins	Nominations
American Music Awards	1	0
Circle Chart Music	0	1
Golden Disc	4	0
MAMA	2	11
Melon Music	2	2
MTV Asia	0	1
MTV VMA	1	1
Seoul Music	2	2
KBS Music Awards	3	3
MBC Music Awards	5	5
SBS Music Awards	4	4
Other awards	2	1

Totals (Note: Certain award groups do not simply award one winner. They acknowledge several different recipients, have runners-up, and have third place. Since this is a specific recognition and is different from losing an award, runner-up mentions are considered wins in this award tally. For simplification and to avoid errors, each award in this list has been presumed to have had a prior nomination.)
- Wins: 32
- Nominations: 47

This is a list of awards and nominations received by the South Korean pop group g.o.d. The group debuted in 1999 before going on hiatus from 2006 to 2014.

Name of award ceremony, year presented, award category, nominee of award, and result of nomination
Award ceremony	Year	Category	Nominee(s) / Work(s)	Result	Ref.
Edaily Culture Awards	2018	Best Concert of the Year	g.o.d 20th Anniversary Concert "Greatest"	Nominated	
Gaon Chart Music Awards	2014	Song of the Year (May)	"The Lone Duckling"	Won	
Golden Disc Awards	2000	Album Bonsang	Chapter 3	Won	
Golden Disc Awards	2000	Album Daesang	Chapter 3	Nominated	
Golden Disc Awards	2001	Album Bonsang	Chapter 4	Won	
Golden Disc Awards	2001	Album Daesang	Chapter 4	Won	
Golden Disc Awards	2005	Album Bonsang	An Ordinary Day	Won	
Golden Disc Awards	2005	Album Daesang	An Ordinary Day	Nominated	
Golden Disc Awards	2005	Popularity Award	g.o.d	Won	
Golden Disc Awards	2014	Digital Song Bonsang	"The Lone Duckling"	Nominated	
KBS Music Awards	2000	Singer of the Year	"Lies"	Won	
KBS Music Awards	2001	Singer of the Year	"Road"	Won	
KBS Music Awards	2005	Singer of the Year	g.o.d	Nominated	
KMTV Music Awards	1999	Bonsang Award	g.o.d	Won	
KMTV Music Awards	2000	Bonsang Award	g.o.d	Won	
KMTV Music Awards	2001	Bonsang Award	g.o.d	Won	
Korean Broadcasters Association Awards	2001	Singer of the Year	g.o.d	Won	
Korea Minting and Printing Corporation	2001	Best Group Singer Award	g.o.d	Won	
Korea Visual Arts Festival	2001	Photogenic Award	g.o.d	Won	
Korea Visual Arts Festival	2005	Photogenic Award	g.o.d	Won	
MAMA Awards	1999	Best New Group	"Dear Mother"	Nominated	
MAMA Awards	1999	Best Hip-Hop Performance	"Dear Mother"	Nominated	
MAMA Awards	1999	Best Music Video Director (for 인한)	"Dear Mother"	Nominated	
MAMA Awards	2000	Best Male Group	"Love and Remember"	Won	
MAMA Awards	2000	Best R&B Performance	"Love and Remember"	Nominated	
MAMA Awards	2001	Most Popular Music Video (Daesang)	"Lies"	Won	
MAMA Awards	2001	Best Male Group	"Lies"	Nominated	
MAMA Awards	2002	Best Male Group	"Road"	Nominated	
MAMA Awards	2002	Special Jury Prize	"Road"	Nominated	
MAMA Awards	2003	Best Male Group	"Letter"	Nominated	
MAMA Awards	2005	Best Male Group	"An Ordinary Day"	Nominated	
MBC Music Awards	2000	Teen's Choice – Singers of the Year	g.o.d	Won	
MBC Music Awards	2001	Under 30's Choice – Singers of the Year	g.o.d	Won	
MBC Music Awards	2001	Popularity Award	g.o.d	Won	
MBC Music Awards	2001	Under 30's Choice – Top Song	"Road"	Won	
MBC Music Awards	2002	Teen's Choice – Singers of the Year	g.o.d	Won	
Melon Music Awards	2014	Album of the Year (Daesang)	Chapter 8	Won	
Melon Music Awards	2014	Top 10 Artists	g.o.d	Won	
MTV Asia Awards	2002	Favorite Artist (Korea)	g.o.d	Nominated	
MTV Video Music Awards	2001	International Viewer's Choice Award for MTV Korea	"Lies"	Won	
SBS Music Awards	1999	Popularity Award	g.o.d	Won	
SBS Music Awards	2000	10's Choice Award – Singers of the Year	g.o.d	Won	
SBS Music Awards	2001	Singers of the Year	"Road"	Won	
SBS Music Awards	2005	Singers of the Year	g.o.d	Won	
Seoul Music Awards	2000	Bonsang Award	g.o.d	Won	
Seoul Music Awards	2001	Bonsang Award	g.o.d	Won	
Style Icon Awards	2014	Style Icon	g.o.d	Won	

== Listicles ==
g.o.d on select listicles
Publisher	Year	Listicle	Ranking	Ref.
The Dong-a Ilbo	2016	Best male artists according to experts	4th	
The Dong-a Ilbo	2016	Best male artists according to the public	3rd	
Golden Disc Awards	2025	Golden Disc Powerhouse 40	Placed	
Mnet	2013	Legend 100 Artists	90th	
