= List of g.o.d concert tours =

g.o.d concert tours
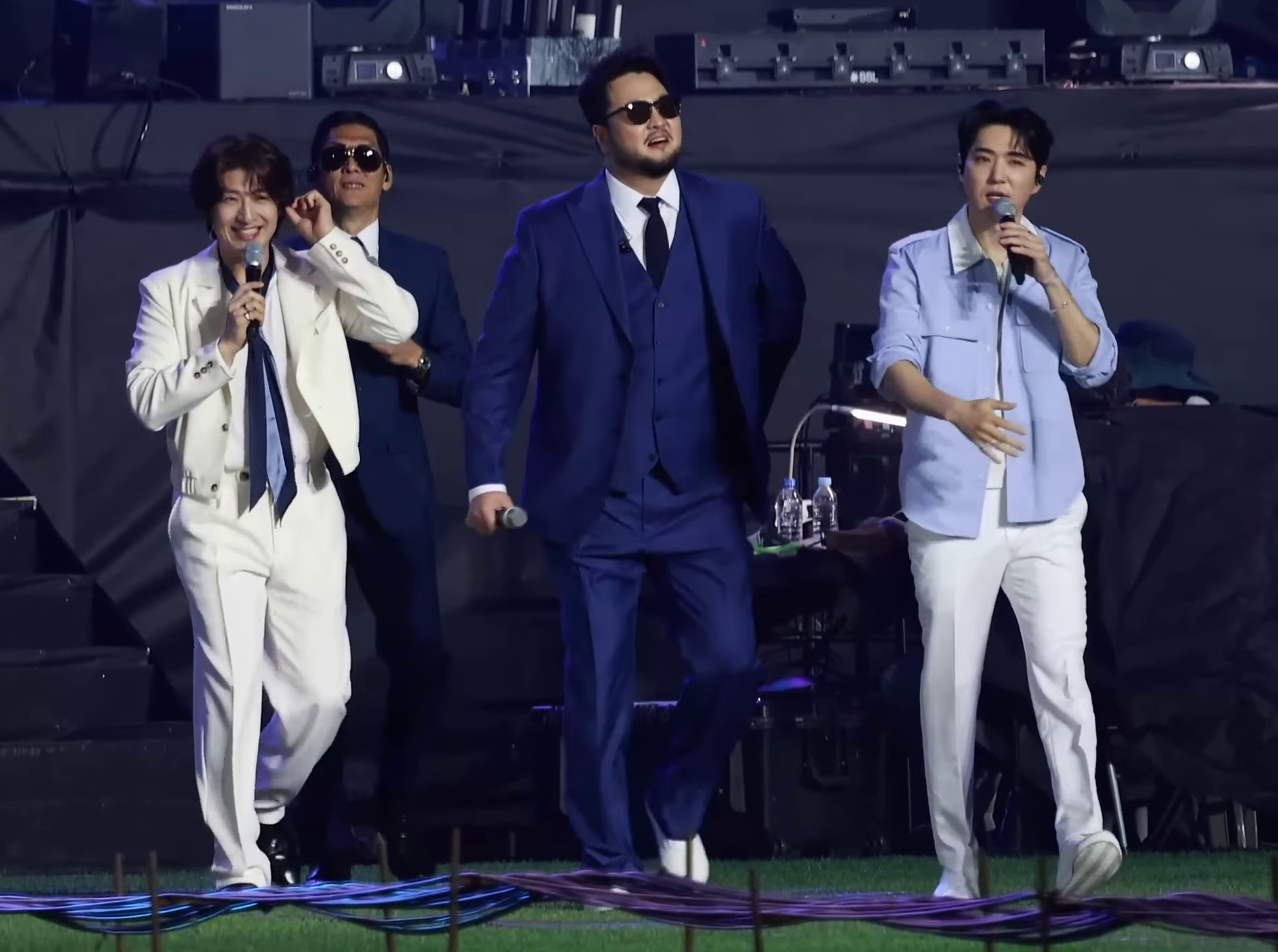
- g.o.d in 2025
- Concert tours: 11
- Fan meetings: 5
- Showcases: 1

g.o.d are a South Korean boy band formed in 1999. They have embarked on 11 concert tours throughout their career, and have performed 19 concerts at the Olympic Gymnastics Arena in Seoul.

== 1st National Tour: "The Story of Five Men" ==
g.o.d only held their first concert tour two years after their debut as their first album was not an immediate success. The success of their second album and appearance in their own reality show led to a surge in popularity. The title of the concert tour The Story of Five Men (다섯 남자 이야기) is the title of a song from the second album. It was announced in January 2001, following the release of the third album. It began in Daejeon and ended in Seoul. The live album was released in August that year.

Initially, the Seoul leg was to take place over two dates in March at the Olympic Gymnastics Arena. Days before the opening concert in Daejeon, heavy snowfall damaged a section of the arena's roof and repairs would not be made in time due to poor weather conditions. Rather than play over two dates in a smaller venue, the management opted for a single date in a much larger venue and the Olympic Stadium was announced as the new venue.

Shows

Date	City	Country	Venue	Attendance
February 25, 2001	Daejeon	South Korea	Korea Trade Exhibition Center	—
March 1, 2001	Gwangju	South Korea	Yeomju Indoor Stadium	—
March 4, 2001	Daegu	South Korea	Daegu Gymnasium	—
March 11, 2001	Busan	South Korea	Sajik Arena	—
April 5, 2001	Seoul	South Korea	Seoul Olympic Stadium	30,000
April 8, 2001	Incheon	South Korea	Sunin Gymnasium (INU)	—

== 100 Days Human Concert ==
100 Days Human Concert
- Tour by g.o.d
- Start date: July 11, 2002
- End date: March 30, 2003
- Legs: 2
- No. of shows: 100

g.o.d concert chronology
- 1st National Tour: The Story of Five Men (2001); 100 Days Human Concert; SK Telecom Ting Concert series (2003)

Despite the huge success of their fourth album, g.o.d decided against going on television programs to promote and embarking on another concert tour and opted on a concert residency at the Popcorn Hall theater in Seoul, performing on four days of the week. It was entitled "100 Days Human Concert" (100일간의 휴먼 콘서트) and featured a different theme everyday.

The 100 Day Human Concert residency was considered landmark in the K-pop industry as the concept of a concert residency was unheard of in South Korea at that time. g.o.d also became the first K-pop group to play in 100 solo concerts. Industry commentators have since noted that the concert residency model was not viable in K-pop as singers and idol groups were much more reliant on the media to boost their public profile and promote releases. The lack of appearances on television programs led to the decline in the group's album sales when their fifth album was released. Despite the general decline on concert ticket sales within the K-pop industry, the group were able to sell out the 3000-seat theater nearly every night.

The first leg ran from July 11 to September 22, 2002, and the second leg ran from December 25, 2002, to March 30, 2003. In between the legs, the members took time out to prepare for the fifth album.

== god — SK Telecom Ting Concert ==
List of concert dates
Date	City	Country	Venue
August 2, 2003	Gwangju	South Korea	Yeomju Indoor Stadium
August 9, 2003	Busan	South Korea	Sajik Arena
August 16, 2003	Daegu	South Korea	Daegu Gymnasium
August 22, 2003	Daejeon	South Korea	Chungmu Gymnasium
August 29, 2003	Seoul	South Korea	Jamsil Arena

== "god is Back" — National Tour ==
List of concert dates
Date	City	Country	Venue
February 26, 2005	Seoul	South Korea	Olympic Gymnastics Arena
February 27, 2005	Seoul	South Korea	Olympic Gymnastics Arena
March 12, 2005	Daegu	South Korea	Daegu Indoor Stadium
March 13, 2005	Daegu	South Korea	Daegu Indoor Stadium
March 19, 2005	Daejoon	South Korea	Korea Trade Exhibition Center
March 20, 2005	Daejoon	South Korea	Korea Trade Exhibition Center
March 26, 2005	Bucheon	South Korea	Bucheon Gymnasium
March 27, 2005	Bucheon	South Korea	Bucheon Gymnasium
April 2, 2005	Gwangju	South Korea	Dongkang Gymnasium
April 3, 2005	Gwangju	South Korea	Dongkang Gymnasium
April 9, 2005	Suncheon	South Korea	Palma Gymnasium
April 16, 2005	Busan	South Korea	Busan KBS Hall
April 17, 2005	Busan	South Korea	Busan KBS Hall
April 23, 2005	Jeonju	South Korea	Sori Arts Center
April 26, 2005	Gangneung	South Korea	Gangneung Gymnasium
May 15, 2005	Cheongju	South Korea	Cheongju Gymnasium
May 20, 2005	Seoul	South Korea	Olympic Hall
May 21, 2005	Seoul	South Korea	Olympic Hall
May 22, 2005	Seoul	South Korea	Olympic Hall
May 28, 2005	Seoul	South Korea	Olympic Hall
May 29, 2005	Seoul	South Korea	Olympic Hall

== 15th anniversary reunion tour ==
The group began their 15th anniversary tour on July 12, 2014, at Seoul Sports Complex's Auxiliary Stadium. It was their first concert as a quintet in 12 years. Initially they had planned to hold two concerts over two days in Seoul but extended it to eight more dates in four other cities due to popular demand. They concluded their national tour with an encore concert in October at the 40,000-capacity Seoul Olympic Stadium, the second time they have held a sold-out concert at the venue, the first time being in April 2001.

In November, they extended their tour overseas, holding concerts in Los Angeles and Newark, New Jersey, and became the first South Korean group to hold solo concerts at American stadiums since Big Bang's Alive Galaxy Tour.

According to Interpark, the main domestic online ticketing service, the tour was ranked 9th in ticket sales (non-classical concert category) and was one of the highest-grossing tours by a K-pop group for the year 2014.

Shows

List of concert dates
Date	City	Country	Venue	Attendance
July 12, 2014	Seoul	South Korea	Jamsil Auxiliary Stadium	70,000
July 13, 2014	Seoul	South Korea	Jamsil Auxiliary Stadium	70,000
August 2, 2014	Gwangju	South Korea	Yeomju Indoor Stadium	70,000
August 3, 2014	Gwangju	South Korea	Yeomju Indoor Stadium	70,000
August 15, 2014	Busan	South Korea	Busan Exhibition & Convention Center	70,000
August 16, 2014	Busan	South Korea	Busan Exhibition & Convention Center	70,000
August 23, 2014	Daegu	South Korea	Daegu Exhibition & Convention Center	70,000
August 24, 2014	Daegu	South Korea	Daegu Exhibition & Convention Center	70,000
August 30, 2014	Daejeon	South Korea	Korea Trade Exhibition Center	70,000
August 31, 2014	Daejeon	South Korea	Korea Trade Exhibition Center	70,000
October 25, 2014	Seoul	South Korea	Seoul Olympic Stadium	40,000
November 7, 2014	Los Angeles	United States	Staples Center	—
November 9, 2014	Newark	United States	Prudential Center	—
Total				110,000

== 2015 concert tour ==
In early December 2015, g.o.d released the maxi single "A Funny but Sad Day" (웃픈 하루) and appeared on Immortal Songs: Singing the Legend to promote their upcoming tour.

Shows

List of concert dates
Date	City	Country	Venue
December 16, 2015	Seoul	South Korea	Olympic Gymnastics Arena
December 17, 2015	Seoul	South Korea	Olympic Gymnastics Arena
December 18, 2015	Seoul	South Korea	Olympic Gymnastics Arena
December 19, 2015	Seoul	South Korea	Olympic Gymnastics Arena
December 20, 2015	Seoul	South Korea	Olympic Gymnastics Arena
December 24, 2015	Daegu	South Korea	Exhibition & Convention Center (EXCO)
December 25, 2015	Daegu	South Korea	Exhibition & Convention Center (EXCO)
December 30, 2015	Busan	South Korea	Busan Exhibition and Convention Center
December 31, 2015	Busan	South Korea	Busan Exhibition and Convention Center

== 2017 "g.o.d to Men" Tour ==
In November 2016, the "g.o.d to MEN" national tour was announced. It was designed and choreographed as a Broadway musical.

Lee Mi-hyun of the JoongAng Ilbo, in reviewing the Seoul leg of the tour, praised the group for their ability to entertain and reinvent themselves without compromising their artistic integrity or losing their unique sound.

List of concert dates
Date	City	Country	Venue
January 6, 2017	Seoul	South Korea	Jamsil Arena
January 7, 2017	Seoul	South Korea	Jamsil Arena
January 8, 2017	Seoul	South Korea	Jamsil Arena
January 13, 2017	Incheon	South Korea	Namdong Gymnasium
January 21, 2017	Daegu	South Korea	Daegu Exhibition & Convention Center
February 4, 2017	Goyang	South Korea	KINTEX Exhibition Center 1, Hall 5
February 11, 2017	Gwangju	South Korea	Gwangju Women's University Gymnasium
February 18, 2017	Busan	South Korea	BEXCO Exhibition Hall 1

== g.o.d 20th Anniversary Tour "Greatest" ==
List of concert dates
Date	City	Country	Venue
November 30, 2018	Seoul	South Korea	Olympic Gymnastics Arena
December 1, 2018	Seoul	South Korea	Olympic Gymnastics Arena
December 2, 2018	Seoul	South Korea	Olympic Gymnastics Arena
December 22, 2018	Busan	South Korea	BEXCO Exhibition Hall 1
December 25, 2018	Daegu	South Korea	Daegu Exhibition & Convention Center
January 13, 2019	Seoul	South Korea	Olympic Gymnastics Arena

== 2022 g.o.d Concert "On" ==
List of concert dates
Date	City	Country	Venue	Attendance
December 9, 2022	Seoul	South Korea	Olympic Gymnastics Arena	—
December 10, 2022	Seoul	South Korea	Olympic Gymnastics Arena	—
December 11, 2022	Seoul	South Korea	Olympic Gymnastics Arena	—
December 24, 2022	Busan	South Korea	BEXCO Exhibition Hall 1	—
December 25, 2022	Busan	South Korea	BEXCO Exhibition Hall 1	—
Total				—

== 2023 "g.o.d's Masterpiece" Tour ==
The tour was among the top 5 highest-grossing domestic tours by a K-pop group for the year 2023. A concert film of the tour was produced and screened in cinemas nationwide on January 10, 2024 in anticipation of the group's 25th anniversary.

List of concert dates
Date	City	Country	Venue	Attendance
November 10, 2023	Seoul	South Korea	Olympic Gymnastics Arena	—
November 11, 2023	Seoul	South Korea	Olympic Gymnastics Arena	—
November 12, 2023	Seoul	South Korea	Olympic Gymnastics Arena	—
December 23, 2023	Daegu	South Korea	Daegu Exhibition & Convention Center	—
December 24, 2023	Daegu	South Korea	Daegu Exhibition & Convention Center	—
December 30, 2023	Busan	South Korea	BEXCO Exhibition Hall 1	—
December 31, 2023	Busan	South Korea	BEXCO Exhibition Hall 1	—
Total				—

== 2024 Concert "Chapter 0" ==
List of concert dates
Date	City	Country	Venue	Attendance
September 27, 2024	Seoul	South Korea	Olympic Gymnastics Arena	—
September 28, 2024	Seoul	South Korea	Olympic Gymnastics Arena	—
September 29, 2024	Seoul	South Korea	Olympic Gymnastics Arena	—

== 2025 Concert "Iconic Box" ==
List of concert dates
Date	City	Country	Venue	Attendance
December 5, 2025	Seoul	South Korea	Olympic Gymnastics Arena	—
December 6, 2025	Seoul	South Korea	Olympic Gymnastics Arena	—
December 7, 2025	Seoul	South Korea	Olympic Gymnastics Arena	—
December 20, 2025	Busan	South Korea	BEXCO Exhibition Hall 1	—
December 21, 2025	Busan	South Korea	BEXCO Exhibition Hall 1	—
Total				—
