= Son Ho-young discography =

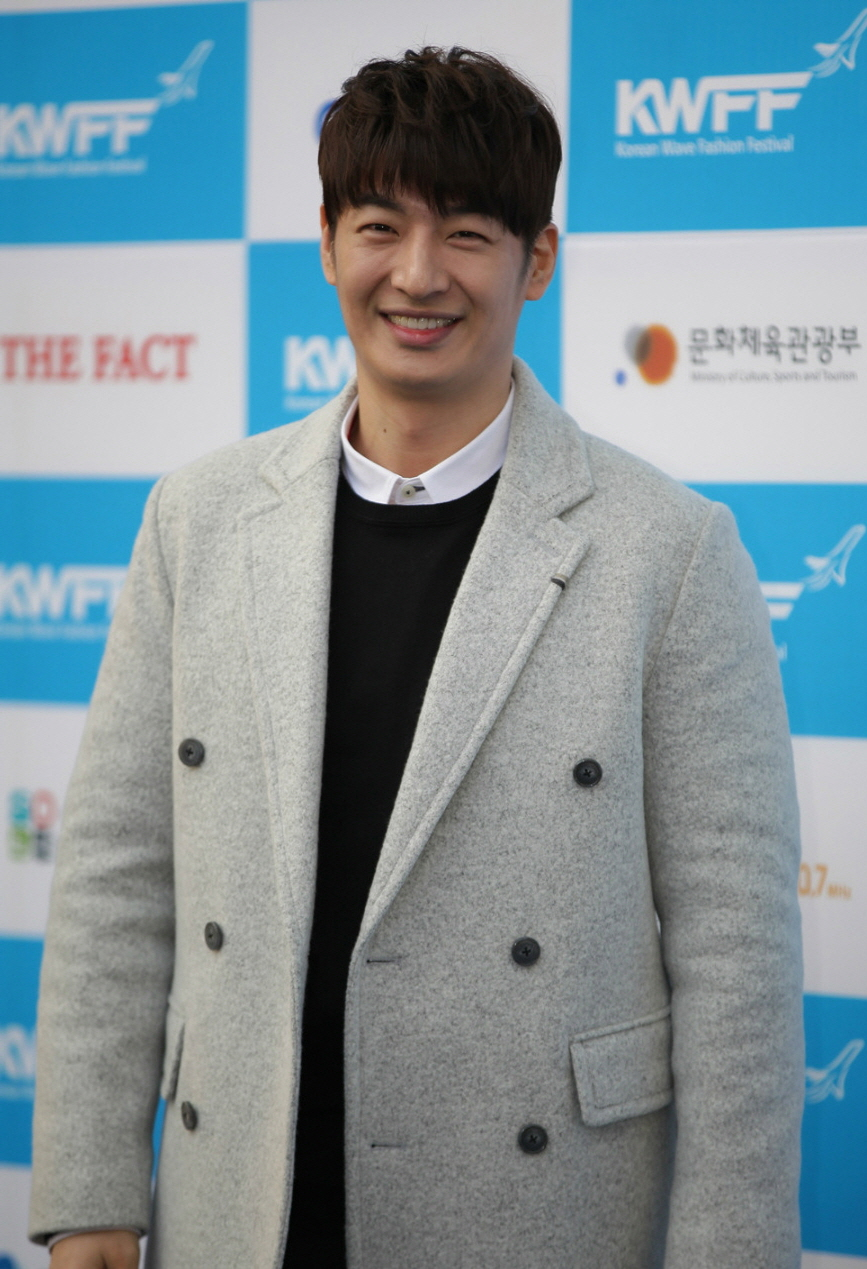
- Son Hoyoung at the Korean Wave Fashion Festival, 2015
- Studio albums: 2
- EPs: 3
- Music videos: 6
- OST: 10

The discography of Korean-American singer Son Ho-young includes two studio albums and three EPs. He debuted in 1999 as a member of pop music group g.o.d, and went solo in 2006.

== Studio albums ==
Title	Album details	Peak chart positions	Sales
Title	Album details	KOR RIAK	Sales
Yes	Released: September 14, 2006; Label: LOBE Entertainment; Format: CD, cassette	2	KOR: 85,476
Returns	Released: October 9, 2008; Label: LOBE Entertainment; Format: CD	—N/a	

== Extended plays ==
Title	Album details	Peak chart positions		Sales
Title	Album details	KOR RIAK	KOR Gaon	Sales
Sweet Love	Released: July 27, 2007; Label: LOBE Entertainment; Format: CD	2	—	KOR: 25,721
U-TURN	Released: November 10, 2011; Label: CJ E&M; Format: CD, digital download	—N/a	5	KOR: 6,155
May, I	Released: May 23, 2016; Label: MMO Entertainment; Format: CD, digital download	—N/a	8	KOR: 5,892

== Singles ==
=== As lead artist ===
Title	Year	Album	Ref
어쩌다가 (ft. Ye-in)	2007	non-album single	
"The First Noel"	2007	Christmas Present	
씻고 준비해야죠 (Lee Hyun-wook (ko) with Son Hoyoung)	2008	non-album single	
"I Know" (remix ver.)	2008	Original song from Returns	
"None Like You" (너 같은 사람 없어)	2016	May, I (repackaged version)	

=== As featured artist ===
Title	Year	Album	Ref
"Smile Again"	2008	I Love Asia (digital single)	
"Baby I Love U" (Suho feat. Son Ho-young)	2009		
"Memory and Remembrance" (기억과 추억) (Kim Tae-woo feat. Joonhyung, Hoyoung and Danny)	2009	T-Virus	
"Raining" (비가) (Kim Jin-woo feat. Son Ho-young)	2010	non-album single	
"Love Will Be Ok" (잘할게) (Natthew feat. Son Ho-young)	2014	non-album single	

== Contributed songs ==
=== As lead artist ===
Title	Year	Album	Ref
똑같은 사람	2008	RHAPSODY: [The soul of sound]	
"Just Say It" (어서 말을 해)	2014	Immortal Songs: Singing the Legend – Legendary Folk Duos	
"Senoya Senoya" (with Kim Dong-jun)	2014	Immortal Songs: Singing the Legend – Legendary Singer: Yang Hee-eun	
"Shaken by the Wind, Wet from the Rain" (바람에 흔들리고 비에 젖어도)	2015	Immortal Songs: Singing the Legend — Legends of Soul: Park Seong-hoon & Park Hyeon-jin	
"My Love"	2016	Immortal Songs: Singing the Legend — Lee Seung-chul and 6 Special Vocalists	
"Paper Crane" (종이학)	2016	Immortal Songs: Singing the Legend — Lee Beom-hee	
"Mi manchi" (그대를 그리며) (Jin Yoon-hee with Son Ho-young)	2017	The Forest	

=== As featured artist ===
Title	Year	Album	Ref
친구란 이름으로 (Kim Tae-woo feat. Son Ho-young)	2006	Solo Special	
다시 내 곁으로 (As One feat. Son Ho-young)	2007		
"Fool" (바보야) (Kil Gun feat. Son Ho-young)	2007	Born Again	
어쩌다가; Cho-ah feat. Son Ho-young)	2007	예인 (霓人) (Yein) Vol.1	
즐거운 인생 (Tim feat. Son Ho-young and Danny Jung)	2007	Volume 4 - Love Is...	
"Hungry for Love" (니가 고파) (Kim Tae-woo feat. Mad Clown and Son Ho-young)	2017	T-WITH	

== Soundtracks ==
Title	Year	Show	Ref
"Secret"	2007	Miss Gold Digger	
현대연애백서 (Trespass with Son Ho-young)	2007	Miss Gold Digger	
"Thorn" (가시)	2010	Smile, Mom	
"I Only Wanted You" (너만을 원했다) (feat. narration by Song Joong-ki)	2012	The Innocent Man	
"It's Strange" (이상해요)	2012	I Love Lee Tae-ri	
"Look at Me" (나를 좀 봐봐)	2013	Flower Boys Next Door	
"One Day" (하루만) (solo ver.)	2014	Marriage, Not Dating	
"One Day" (하루만) (feat. Danny Ahn)	2014	Marriage, Not Dating	
"Moon Light"	2016	Come Back Mister	
"Fantastic Star" (판타스틱 스타)	2016	Fantastic	
"A Book of You" (너라는 책)	2019	Romance Is a Bonus Book	
"Wing It!" (with Kim Tae-woo)	2019	The Great Show	

== Charted songs ==
Title	Year	Peak Chart Positions		Sales (DL)^{2}	Album	Notes
Title	Year	Gaon^{1} Weekly	Gaon^{1} Monthly	Sales (DL)^{2}	Album	Notes
"You Fool" (이 바보야) (feat. Chiyoo)	2011			KOR: 79,911+	U-TURN	
"Pretty But Hateful" (예쁘고 미웠다) (feat. Bizzy)	2011	72	—	KOR: 155,103+	U-TURN	
"I Only Wanted You" (너만을 원했다)	2012	83	—	KOR: 50,347+	The Innocent Man OST	
"One Day" (하루만) (solo ver.)	2014	33	77	KOR: 120,930+	Marriage, Not Dating OST	

- ^{^1} Chart information is from the Gaon Digital Chart only.
- ^{^2} Sales figures are from the Gaon Download Chart.

== Music videos ==
Song	Year	Album	Starring	Ref
"Love Brings Separation" (사랑은 이별을 데리고 오다)	2006	Yes		
"My Heart is in Heaven" (하늘에 내 마음이)	2007	Sweet Love		
"We Can Make It" (Jang Keun-suk, Son Ho-young and Tim as "WEE Band")	2008	Ministry of Education WEE Project		
"I Know"	2008	Returns		
"Pretty But Hateful" (예쁘고 미웠다) (feat. Bizzy)	2011	U-TURN	Suzy	
"My Weak Point" (나의 약점)	2016	May, I		

=== Appearances ===
Song	Artist	Year	Album	Starring	Ref
"Memory and Remembrance" (기억과 추억)	Kim Tae-woo	2009	T-Virus	Danny Ahn, Son Ho-young, Suho, Yubi and Park Joon-hyung	
"Love Will Be Ok" (잘할게)	Natthew	2014	non-album single	Son Ho-young and Park Bo-ram	
