= Kim Tae-woo discography =

- Studio albums: 5
- EPs: 2
- Music videos: 9
- OST: 15

This is the discography of South Korean singer Kim Tae-woo. Debuting in 1999 as a member of the group g.o.d, he began his solo career in 2006 and has since recorded seven studio albums.

== Studio albums ==
Title	Album details	Peak chart positions	Sales
Title	Album details	KOR	Sales
Solo Special (하고 싶은 말)	Released: October 26, 2006; Label: CJ E&M; Format: CD, cassette; Track listing: 1. 노래야 말해줘; 2. 보낼수 없는 편지; 3. PIANO; 4. 하고싶은 말 5. M.U.S.I.C (featuring Lim Jeong-hee); 6. I Love U Oh Thank U (featuring MC Mong); 7. 그대안의 블루 (featuring Lyn); 8. 인스턴트 (featuring Psy); 9. 친구란 이름으로 (featuring Son Ho-young); 10. 봄 여름 가을 겨울 (featuring 수호)	72	KOR: 29,068
T-Virus	Released: September 3, 2009; Label: Polaris Entertainment; Format: CD; Track listing: 1. 하고 싶은 말 Part 2; 2. Faster (feat. 유비); 3. 사랑비; 4. 내가 야! 하면 넌 예! (Duet with Lyn); 5. 점점점 (feat. 앙리); 6. 기억과 추억 (feat. Park Joon-hyung, Son Ho-young and Danny Ahn)	20	
T-School	Released: March 3, 2011; Label: Soul Shop Entertainment; Format: CD, Digital download; Track listing: 1. 음악으로; 2. Brothers ＆ Me (feat. JYP & Rain); 3. 메아리; 4. 이게 말이 돼? (feat. 수호); 5. 늦기전에; 6. 빗물이 내려서; 7. 그대라는 날개; 8. 6년전 오늘 (feat. Lyn); 9. Just Smile (feat. Mighty Mouth); 10. 메아리 (instrumental)	3	KOR: 13,185
T-Road	Released: June 18, 2015; Label: Soul Shop Entertainment; Format: CD, Digital download; Track listing: 1. Intro (T-ROAD); 2. 널 닮으리; 3. 달콤 (feat. Joo Hee (ko)); 4. 한강고수부지; 5. My Way (feat. Yoon Do-hyun); 6. 음악빛; 7. 뽀레버막내 (feat. Danny Ahn); 8. 둘이면; 9. Lonely Funk (DJ Ver.); 10. Lonely Funk (Inst.); 11. 널 닮으리 (Inst.)	11	KOR: 2,767
T-WITH	Released: July 3, 2017; Label: Soul Shop Entertainment; Format: CD, Digital download; Track listing: 1. 디렉터스컷 (feat. KIXS); 2. 따라가; 3. 니가 고파 (feat. Mad Clown and Son Ho-young); 4. Sunrise (feat. Punch); 5. 느낌적인 느낌 (feat. Jun. K and Taecyeon); 6. 시원해 (feat. Ali); 7. 시간 (feat. U Sung-eun); 8. 시원해 (remix); 9. 따라가 (inst.); 10. 니가 고파 (inst.)	28	KOR: 1,157

== Extended plays ==
Title	Album details	Peak chart positions	Sales
Title	Album details	KOR	Sales
T-Love	Released: February 20, 2013; Label: Soul Shop Entertainment; Format: CD, Digital download; Track listing: 1. 또또; 2. Cosmic Girl; 3. 오빠 (feat. Megan Lee); 4. Lovecoaster; 5. 언제나, 어디든	10	KOR: 2,270
Kim Tae Woo With Friends	Released: December 25, 2017; Label: Soul Shop Entertainment; Format: CD, Digital download; Track listing: 1. Christmas Love; 2. 고요한 어둔 밤 (with Kim Jae-woo, Lee Ho-jin); 3. 나 홀로 집에 (with Nayul); 4. 하늘빛 (with 하늘소리 어린이 합창단); 5. 고요한 어둔 밤 (with Yang Hyun-ook); 6. Christmas Love (Inst.); 7. 고요한 어둔 밤 (Inst.); 8. 나 홀로 집에 (Inst.); 9. 하늘빛 (Inst.)	89	

== Singles ==
=== As lead artist ===
Title	Year	Peak chart positions	Sales (Digital)	Album
Title	Year	KOR	Sales (Digital)	Album
"Words I'd Want To Say" (하고싶은 말)	2006	—		Solo Special
"Be Alright"	2007	—		Non-album single
"Memory and Remembrance" (기억과 추억) (feat. Joon-hyung, Ho-young and Danny)	2009	—		T-Virus
"Love Rain" (사랑비)	2009	—		T-Virus
"Love Snow" (사랑눈) (feat. Droplet, Slime)	2009	72		Non-album single
"Brothers ＆ Me" (with JYP & Rain)	2011	11	KOR: 641,162	T-School
"Echo" (메아리)	2011	7	KOR: 1,278,707	T-School
"When I Look At Myself" (내가 나를 봐도 슬퍼)	2012	12	KOR: 375,498	Duble Kick Project Vol.1
"Girl" (그런 걸) (with Bobby Kim)	2012	63		Non-album single
"Cosmic Girl"	2013	19	KOR: 313,719	T-Love
"Goodbye" (굿바이)	2013	63	KOR: 87,530	Hitman Project #4
"Ho Ho Hobbang" (호호호빵) (with Wheesung)	2014	55	KOR: 56,714	Non-album single
"No Matter What" (둘이면)	2014	41	KOR: 36,170	T-Road
"Lonely Funk" (feat. Jay Park)	2015	85	KOR: 24,377	T-Road
"Bongousse" (봉구스) (with Sool J)	2015	—		Non-album single
"Time" (시간) (feat. U Sung-eun)	2016	85	KOR: 30,355	T-WITH
"Because of You" (시원해) (feat. Ali)	2016	76	KOR: 28,937	T-WITH
"Following" (따라가)	2017	93	KOR: 19,344	T-WITH
"Lovin' Hobbang" (호빵이 좋아) (with Wheesung)	2017	—		Non-album single
"Christmas Song"	2017	—		Kim Tae Woo With Friends
"A Taste Of Spring" (봄의 맛)	2018	—		Non-album single

=== As featured artist ===
Title	Year	Peak chart positions	Album
Title	Year	KOR	Album
"I'm Not Kidding" (장난 아니야) (Suho feat. Kim Tae-woo, narr. by Lee Da-hae)	2013	35	Non-album single
"Us" (우리) (G.NA feat. Kim Tae-woo)	2015	71	Non-album single

== Other charted songs ==
=== As lead artist ===
Title	Year	Peak chart positions	Album
Title	Year	KOR	Album
"I Say Yay! You Say Yeah!" (내가 야! 하면 넌 예!) (with Lyn)	2009	83	T-Virus
"Confession" (고해)	2013	63	Immortal Songs: Singing the Legend 2
"In Order that Farewell Doesn't Come" (이별이 오지 못하게)	2016	56	Two Yoo Project Sugar Man Part 16

=== As featured artist ===
Title	Year	Peak chart positions	Album
Title	Year	KOR	Album
"Lighthouse" (등대) (Eluphant feat. Kim Tae-woo)	2015	94	Man on the Moon
"Flower" (꽃) (MC Mong feat. Kim Tae-woo)	2016	50	UFO

== Soundtrack appearances ==
Title	Year	Peak chart positions	Sales (Digital)	Album
Title	Year	KOR	Sales (Digital)	Album
"Fly High" (날아오르다) (feat. Suho)	2007	—		Fly High OST
"Dreaming Dream" (꿈을 꾸다)	2010	21		Iris OST
"Dropping Rain" (빗물이 내려서)	2010	13		Personal Taste OST
"You're My Wings" (그대라는 날개)	2010	5		Personal Taste OST
"Falling in Love" (사랑에 빠지다)	2011	12		Warrior Baek Dong-soo OST
"So I Run" (그래서 달린다)	2012	26		Feast of the Gods OST
"High High"	2012	15	KOR: 1,234,177+	A Gentleman's Dignity OST
"I'm Stupid" (나는 바보다)	2013	32		The Queen of Office OST
"My Lady"	2013	81		Marry Him If You Dare OST
"Con Amore Mio"	2014	86		Big Man OST
"Because It's You" (너라서)	2014	96		Diary of a Night Watchman OST
"Only You" (너 하나만)	2014	17	KOR: 235,574+	My Lovely Girl OST
"Rust" (녹)	2015	—		Splendid Politics OST
"Glory"	2015	—		AIMA OST
"Darling U" (with Ben)	2015	42	KOR: 33,294+	Oh My Venus OST
"Because of You" (너 때문에)	2016	—		Don't Dare to Dream OST
"Wing It!" (with Son Ho-young)	2019	—		The Great Show OST
"Love Ya"	2020	—		Backstreet Rookie OST

== Music videos ==
Year	Song	Album	Starring	Link
2009	"Love Rain" (사랑비)	T-Virus		
2009	"Memory and Remembrance" (기억과 추억)	T-Virus	Danny Ahn, Son Ho-young, Suho, Yubi, Park Joon-hyung	
2011	"Brothers & Me"	T-School	Park Jin-young and Rain	
2011	"Echo" (메아리)	T-School		
2012	"When I Look At Myself" (내가 나를 봐도 슬퍼)	Duble Kick Project Vol.1		
2013	"Cosmic Girl"	T-Love		
2015	"Resemblance" (널 닮으리)	T-Road		
2015	"Lonely Funk"	T-Road	Kim Jun-hyun, Park Jee-su (KIXS), Danny Ahn	
2017	"Following" (따라가)	T-WITH		
