= Then & Now (g.o.d album) =

2019 compilation album by g.o.d

Compilation album by g.o.d
- Released: January 10, 2019
- Genres: K-pop; R&B; dance-pop
- Length: 36:01
- Labels: SidusHQ, Kakao M
- Producer: Kim Tae-woo

G.o.d chronology
Chapter 8 (2014)	Then & Now (2019)

Singles from Then & Now
- 1. "Snowfall" Released: November 27, 2018

Then & Now is a compilation album released by South Korean pop music group g.o.d in 2019. Consisting of new original songs and remade tracks, it is their ninth full-length release and first since 2014. It was released to commemorate the 20th anniversary of their debut.

== Overview ==
The album contains ten tracks, four of which are new original material. A music video was made for the song "Snowfall", which was pre-released as a digital single. The first title track "Leave That Man" was specially composed and produced by Park Jin-young at the group's request, marking the first time Park has worked with them since they left JYP Entertainment and went on hiatus in 2005. The second single "Eye to Eye" was co-written by rapper Danny Ahn and the lyrics utilize the titles of their hit songs from previous albums, the solo hits of vocalists Kim Tae-woo and Son Ho-young and the filmography of Yoon Kye-sang.

The other six tracks are remixes of songs from their first four albums. The instrumental track for "Road", the lead single of their fourth album, was completely rearranged by MeloMance member Jeong Dong-hwan and features the vocals of solo singers IU and Yang Da-il, former Super Junior-M member Henry Lau and Jo Hyun-ah of indie R&B trio Urban Zakapa. The remaining five tracks were individually produced by each g.o.d member.

== Release ==
The song "Snowfall" (눈이 내린다) was released as a digital single on November 27, 2018, at 6pm (KST). It was part of the group's promotions for their upcoming year-end concerts from November 30 to December 2. The album was released on January 10, 2019, and is available in both digital and CD formats. The physical album also contains a 72-page photo book.

== Reception and chart performance ==
The album was listed by Billboard as one of the ten most anticipated K-pop albums of 2019. Within 24 hours after its release, it topped local digital charts such as Mnet, Soribada and Naver Music. In its review of the album, the Korea Economic Daily's entertainment-focused subsidiary newspaper 10Asia noted that the new songs were reminiscent of g.o.d's unique musical style and the remakes of the older songs highlighted the individual musical preferences of each member. The title track "Leave That Man" was singled out for praise by 10Asia and The Chosun Ilbo, the latter praising the "sensuous harmony, created by Park Jin-young's addictive melody and vocals of different colors". Genie Music listed the album in its monthly list of recommended albums by domestic artists and cited Park's collaboration as a long-awaited highlight.

The song, "Leave That Man", debuted at number 63 and two other tracks charted on the Gaon Digital Chart. It ranked at number 77 in the monthly chart for January.

== Track listing ==
No.	Title	Lyrics	Music	Length
1.	"20"	Kim Tae-woo^{[a]}; Jung In-hae	칸(KhaN); ZigZag Note; 니화(NiiHWA)	1:44
2.	"Leave That Man" (그 남자를 떠나; Geu namjareul tteo-na)	Park Jin-young^{[a]}	Park	3:24
3.	"Snowfall" (눈이 내린다; Nun-i naerinda)	Kim^{[a]}; 니화(NiiHWA)	Francesca Richard; Edgar Vargas; Kim; 칸(KhaN)	3:55
4.	"Eye to Eye" (눈을 맞춰; Nun-eul matchwo)	Danny Ahn; BOOMBASTIC	BOOMBASTIC	4:02
5.	"Road" (길; Gil) (sung by IU, Henry, Jo Hyun-ah and Yang Da-il)	Park	Park	4:29
6.	"I Know^{[c]}" (나는 알아; Naneun ara)	Park	Park; Bang Si-hyuk	3:05
7.	"So You Can Come Back to Me^{[d]}" (니가 다시 돌아올 수 있도록; Niga dashi doraol su isstolok)	Park	Bang	3:35
8.	"Why^{[e]}" (왜; Wae)	Park; Bang	Bang^{[b]}	4:23
9.	"You Don't Know^{[f]}" (모르죠; Moreujyo)	Park; Bang	Bang	4:19
10.	"The Place Where You Should Be^{[g]}" (니가 있어야 할 곳; Niga it-eo-ya hal got)	Park	Park; Bae Jin-ryeol (JR Groove)	3:05
Total length:				36:01

- ^{^[a]} signifies a producer that has multiple song credits for the album
- ^{^[b]} signifies a composer who is also the arranger
- ^{^[c]} The original song is from the fourth album. This remake was produced by Joon Park.
- ^{^[d]} The original song is from the first album. The remake was produced by Yoon Kye-sang.
- ^{^[e]} The original song is from the third album. The remake was produced by Danny Ahn.
- ^{^[f]} The original song is from the fourth album. This remake was produced by Son Ho-young.
- ^{^[g]} The original song is from the fourth album. This remake was produced by Kim Tae-woo.

== Charts ==
Chart (2019)	Peak position
South Korean Albums (Gaon)	4
