= Chapter 1 (g.o.d album) =

Studio album by g.o.d
- Released: January 26, 1999
- Recorded: 1998–1999
- Studios: Bay Studio; Seoul Studio; Enterprise Studio
- Genres: K-pop; R&B; dance pop
- Length: 35:25
- Language: Korean
- Labels: EBM, Synnara Records
- Producer: Park Jin-young

G.o.d chronology
Chapter 1 (1999)	Chapter 2 (1999)

Singles from Chapter 3
- 1. "To Mother" Released: January 26, 1999

Chapter 1 is the debut album of the South Korean pop music group g.o.d, released on January 26, 1999. The album was produced by songwriter and JYP Entertainment founder Park Jin-young. The promoted track is "To Mother" (어머님께), which the group sang for their debut televised performance on January 13, 1999.

== Release and reception ==
The album was produced under difficult circumstances as g.o.d's management agency had been affected by the 1997 Asian financial crisis and cut off funding for their trainees. It was eventually released after the group made their official debut performance on television. However, it was not an immediate success as sales figures were comparatively low and the group did not win first place on any music programs.

== Songs ==
Two of the most famous songs from the album are "To Mother" and "Observation", the former eventually becoming known as one of the group's most famous hit songs. "Observation" is remembered for its "steering wheel" dance and the scifi-themed music video. The choreography for both songs was referenced in the music video of "Saturday Night" from the group's reunion album Chapter 8.

== Track listing ==
All lyrics and music are written and composed by Park Jin-young except where noted.

No.	Title	Lyrics	Music	Length
1.	"Intro"			1:06
2.	"Observation" (관찰; Kwanchal)		Lee Cheol-won	3:35
3.	"Wait for Me" (날 기다려줘; Nal gidaryeojwo)		Kim Hyung-suk	4:16
4.	"With Little Men" (작은 남자들과 함께; Jakeun Namjadeulgwa hamgge)		Park Jin-young^{[a]}; Park Joon-hyung^{[b]}; Danny Ahn^{[b]}; Yoon Kye-sang^{[b]}; Son Ho-young^{[b]}; Kim Tae-woo^{[b]}	3:22
5.	"I for You" (난 너에게; Nan neoege)			3:24
6.	"To Mother" (어머님께; Eomeonimkke)	2Pac and various artists	2Pac and various artists; Park Jin-young^{[b]}	4:15
7.	"So You Can Come Back to Me" (니가 다시 돌아올 수 있도록; Niga dashi doraol su isstolok)		Bang Si-hyuk^{[b]}	4:02
8.	"Promise" (약속; Yaksok)	Ahn Yong-jin; Park Jin-young	Ahn Yong-jin; Park Joon-hyung; Danny Ahn; Yoon Kye-sang; Son Ho-young; Kim Tae-woo	3:36
9.	"Why Do I Again" (왜 또 다시 난; Wae tto dashi nan)		Joon Lee	3:29
10.	"Bad Girl" (나쁜여자; Nappeun yeoja)			4:12
Total length:				35:25

- ^{^[b]} Signifies a composer who is also the arranger.

== Credits and personnel ==
g.o.d

- Park Joon-hyung – rapper
- Yoon Kye-sang – vocalist
- Danny Ahn – rapper
- Son Ho-young – vocalist
- Kim Tae-woo – vocalist

Musicians

- J.Goux – other (4, 7)
- Sangwon Han – guitar (10), vocoder
- Gwangmin Kim – other (8)
- Wyzard – bass guitar (4, 7)
- Shin Hyeon-kwon – bass guitar (2, 8)
- Jerry Hey's Brass Band – horn
- Park Jin-young – chorus, rap lyrics (1–7, 9, 10)
- Jo Gyu-chan – chorus (4)
- Yongjin Ahn – chorus (8), computer programming (4, 5, 8)
- Bang Si-hyuk – computer programming (3, 6, 7, 10)
- Joseph Hung Bui – sampling, scratch (4)
- g.o.d – rap making (8)

Staff

- Park Jin-young – producer
- Yongjin Ahn, god – co-producer
- Janghyuk Choi – release
- Hoon-tak Jeong – executive producer
- EBM – production
- Hyun-woo Eom, Jong-jin Han, Kyung-hwan Kim, Jin-young Park, Kye-sang Yoon – recording technology
- Dave "Harddrive" Pensado – mixing (4, 7)
- Yangsu Noh – mixing (8)
- Kookhyun Kim – mixing (1–3, 5, 6, 9, 10)
- Bay Studio, Seoul Studio, Enterprise Studio (Los Angeles) – mixing studio
- Eddie Schreye (Oasis Mastering Studio) – mastering
- Heejeong Ko, Jeongah Choi (Seoul Studio) – mastering
- Kim Bong-do, Kim Ho-seon, Ryu Jin-hee, Lee Jeong-hoon, Gong Seong-won – photography
- H*2 with Free – design

== Charts and sales ==
=== Monthly charts ===
Chart (1999)	Peak position
South Korean Albums (RIAK)	5

=== Sales ===
Region	Sales
South Korea (RIAK)	156,209
