= To Mother (g.o.d song) =

Single by g.o.d

from the album Chapter 1
- Language: Korean
- Released: January 26, 1999
- Genre: K-pop, R&B
- Length: 4:15
- Label: EBM; Synnara
- Songwriters: Park Jin-young; Tupac Shakur; Johnny Jackson; Joseph Jefferson; Charles Simmons
- Producer: J.Y. Park

G.o.d singles chronology
"To Mother" (1999)	"Love and Remember" (1999)

"To Mother" (Korean: 어머님께; RR: Eomeonimkke) is a song performed by South Korean boy band g.o.d. It was their debut single and was performed live on January 13, 1999, a week prior to the release of their first album Chapter 1.

== Overview ==
The song is categorized as either hip hop or R&B but contains verses which are rapped by Danny Ahn and a chorus sung as a soulful ballad. The lyrics are narrated from the first-person viewpoint of the child, who is now grown up and is telling the story in retrospect. It tells the story of an impoverished widowed mother providing for her family and having to endure humiliation and societal discrimination due to her circumstances. Actor Jang Hyuk, who was housemates with the g.o.d members and a fellow EBM artist, starred as the teenage version of the narrator in the music video.

The story is partly drawn from the group members' experiences of living in austere conditions while training and preparing for their debut and also inspired by the childhood of band leader Park Joon-hyung. Born in South Korea, Park immigrated to the United States with his family as a child. His father died and his mother was forced to raise him and his siblings alone in a new country while struggling financially. Unlike the lyrics of the song, Park's mother is still alive and the food item was actually japchae and not jajangmyeon.

== In popular culture ==
The debut performance of the song on January 13, 1999, had initially earned a lukewarm response from critics. The song garnered g.o.d much attention for its subject matter and the departure from the bubblegum pop or hard rock styles of their contemporaries. Despite this, "To Mother" has become known as one of the group's most popular and well-known songs and often regarded as a classic 1990s K-pop song.

At the time of the album's release "To Mother" was the most requested song on radio stations. It is also a popular choice for Parents' Day celebratory concerts and was most recently covered by ASTRO during the KBS Open Concert (ko) on May 7, 2017. In July 2017, the song was played as the background music when jTBC news anchor Sohn Suk-hee was reporting on insensitive remarks from a National Assembly member over the recent labor strike staged by irregular workers in protest of wage and societal discrimination.

One of the song's most notable lines reflects on how the narrator's mother sacrificed her own meal so that her child (the narrator) could have jajangmyeon and told her child that she did not like jajangmyeon when asked why she did not have any. Jajangmyeon was not an official word when the song was first released and its romanized spelling was only standardized by the National Institute of Korean Language in 2011, which led fans listening to Danny Ahn's radio show to quip that "To Mother" should be the official song of jajangmyeon.

Snippets of the music video were briefly shown on MBC drama Fated to Love You, in episode 13 which featured a cameo appearance from Park Joon-hyung. Jang Hyuk, who portrays the lead character in the drama, enters the scene rapping the first several lines of the song. The episode recorded the drama's highest ratings at that point.

== Composition ==
There was a controversy that "To Mother" plagiarized the "Life Goes On", by 2pac and eventually returned the copyright to 2PAC through an agreement between agencies. JYP Entertainment, Park Jin-young's agency, said, "At that time, it was a problem because they failed to properly process sampling-related payments." the original song "Life Goes On" by 2PAC is marked on the album credit.

== Awards and nominations ==
Year	Organization	Award	Result
1999	Mnet Video Music Awards	Best Hip Hop Performance	Nominated

== Notable cover versions ==
"To Mother" has been covered numerous times since its release in 1999. Some notable cover versions include:

- Son Ho-young (remixed with Tae Jin-ah's "Mother" 사모곡) (winner of Immortal Songs: Singing the Legend episode 81)
- Suho (covered the song and remade the music video for EXO 90:2014)
- Shin Yong-jae ft. Yubin (runner-up of Immortal Songs: Singing the Legend episode 229)
