= Chapter 2 (g.o.d album) =

Studio album by g.o.d
- Released: November 25, 1999
- Recorded: 1999
- Genres: K-pop; R&B
- Length: 39:45
- Labels: EBM; Synnara Records
- Producers: Park Jin-young; Jung Hoon-tak

G.o.d chronology
Chapter 1 (1999)	Chapter 2 (1999)	Chapter 3 (2000)

Singles from Chapter 3
- 1. "Love and Remember" Released: November 25, 1999; 2. "Sorrow" Released: November 25, 1999; 3. "Friday Night" Released: November 25, 1999

Chapter 2 is the second album of South Korean pop music group g.o.d. It was much better received than their debut album, as evidenced by sales figures, and several songs in the album won the number one ranking on various music programs and multiple awards.

== Reception ==
The album contains several of g.o.d's most famous songs. Danny Ahn has credited the album, particularly its title track, with propelling the group to mainstream success, especially after their debut performance and album earlier that year had met with lukewarm critical reception. Producer Park Jin-young has stated that the group had prepared this album under much pressure and may have disbanded for good had it not succeeded. Although the album debuted at only #10 in the RIAK monthly chart, it would go on to sell over 500,000 copies.

"Love and Remember" won the #1 ranking on both SBS's Inkigayo and KBS's Music Bank, earning the group their first ever win on a music program. "Sorrow" (애수) and "Friday Night" both won "Triple Crowns" (#1 spot for three consecutive weeks) on Inkigayo and also won #1 at least once on Music Bank.

== In popular culture ==
"Love and Remember" was used as the background music in the Drama Special episode "Pitch-black Darkness", which starred g.o.d member Danny Ahn and in the tvN television series Reply 1994. It was also chosen as the encore song sung by all performers at the 2017 KBS Song Festival.

== Accolades ==
Awards and nominations
Year	Award	Category	Result	Ref.
2000	Mnet Music Video Festival	Best Male Group (for "Love and Remember")	Won	
2000	Mnet Music Video Festival	Best R&B Performance (for "After You Left Me")	Nominated	

Music program awards
Song	Program	Date
"Love and Remember"	Inkigayo	January 9, 2000
"Love and Remember"	Music Bank	February 1, 2000
"Sorrow"	Inkigayo	March 5, 2000
"Sorrow"	Inkigayo	March 12, 2000
"Sorrow"	Inkigayo	March 19, 2000
"Sorrow"	Music Bank	March 14, 2000
"Sorrow"	Music Bank	March 21, 2000
"Friday Night"	Inkigayo	April 9, 2000
"Friday Night"	Inkigayo	April 16, 2000
"Friday Night"	Inkigayo	April 23, 2000
"Friday Night"	Music Bank	April 11, 2000

== Track listing ==
All lyrics and music are written and composed by Park Jin-young, except where noted.

No.	Title	Lyrics	Music	Length
1.	"Exit, 20th Century-Enter The 21st..."			2:01
2.	"Love and Remember" (사랑해 그리고 기억해; Saranghae geurigo gieokhae)			4:25
3.	"Dance All Night"		Bang Si-hyuk	3:50
4.	"Take It All" (모두 가져가; Modu gajyeoga)			3:41
5.	"After You Left Me" (그대 날 떠난 후로; Geudae nal tteonan horo)			3:38
6.	"Say god"	Park Joon-hyung; Danny Ahn; Yoon Kye-sang; Son Ho-young; Kim Tae-woo		3:43
7.	"Sorrow" (애수; Aesu)	Park Jin-young; Yoo Gun-hyung	Park Jin-young; Yoo Gun-hyung
8.	"Train" (기차)		Bang Si-hyuk	4:31
9.	"Friday Night"		Bang Si-hyuk	3:30
10.	"21C Our Hope" (21C 우리의 희망; 21C uriui huimang)	Park Joon-hyung; Ahn; Yoon; Son; Kim		3:30
11.	"The Story of Five Men" (다섯 남자 이야기; Daseot namja iyagi)	Park Joon-hyung; Ahn; Yoon; Son; Kim	Park Jin-young, Park Joon-hyung	3:15
Total length:				39:45

== Credits and personnel ==
g.o.d

- Park Jun-hyung – rapper
- Yoon Kye-sang – vocals
- Danny Ahn – rapper
- Son Ho-young – vocals
- Kim Tae-woo – vocals

Session

- Park Jin-young, Bang Si-hyuk – drum arrangement, sampling, chorus
- Bang Si-hyuk – drum arrangement, sampling, computer programming
- Shin Yu-na, Kim Hyo-soo – chorus
- Joseph Hung BUI – computer programming
- Eom Se-hee, Lee Hwa-young, Park Soo-yeon, Kim Jeong-ah, Choi Seong-hee, Moon Su-hyung – string music

Staff

- Park Jin-young – producer
- Jeong Hoon-tak – producer
- EBM Productions – executive producer
- Park Pil-won, Jeong Ji-cheol – manager
- Lim Jeong-bin, Yoo Young-hwa – recording
- Jihoon Seong (King Studio) – mixing
- Hyoyoung Choi (Sonic Korea) – mastering
- Kim Jeong-hyun, Lee Hyun-ah – stylist
- Inan – photography
- Noh Min-seok, Seok Jeong-hoon – album design
- Myeongjin – printing

== Charts and sales ==
=== Monthly charts ===
Chart (1999)	Peak position
South Korean Albums (RIAK)	8

=== Year-end charts ===
Chart (1999)	Position
South Korean Albums (RIAK)	10

=== Sales ===
Region	Sales
South Korea	578,567
