= Lies (g.o.d song) =

Single by g.o.d

from the album Chapter 3
- Language: Korean
- Released: November 3, 2000
- Genre: K-pop; R&B
- Length: 4:02
- Label: Sidus, Synnara Records
- Composer: Park Jin-young
- Lyricist: Park Jin-young

G.o.d singles chronology
"Love and Remember" (1999)	"Lies" (2000)	"One Candle" (2000)

Music video
- "Lies" on YouTube

"Lies" (Korean: 거짓말; RR: Geojinmal) is a song performed by South Korean boy band g.o.d. It was the title track from their third album Chapter 3, which was released in 2000. At the time of its release, the song became one of the group's most popular songs, dominating the rankings in music programs, and is still considered one of their representative songs and a classic K-pop song of the early 2000s.

== Background ==
The lyrics and music were composed by Park Jin-young. Jun Ji-hyun, who was a fellow SidusHQ artist at that time, features briefly following Park Joon-hyung's rap and was revealed to have provided the voice for the now iconic line "I hate you!" (싫어, 싫어!). At that time, the group was not managed by his company JYP Entertainment but he worked closely with them as a producer and songwriter.

== Music video and promotion ==
The music video featured then-unknown Korean American actor Sung Kang, who went on to gain fame portraying Han Lue in the successful film franchise Fast & Furious. The song is particularly notable for its unique "fan chants" (Korean: 응원법). During live performances of the song by g.o.d, the audience chants each member's nicknames after the member has sung his line.

== Awards and nominations ==
"Lies" won 9 music program awards, including three "triple crowns" (ranked number one for three consecutive weeks) on the music programs SBS's Inkigayo, KBS's Music Bank and MBC's Music Camp (the former incarnation of Show! Music Core). With "Lies" winning a third consecutive number one win on Inkigayo, the group won their third "Triple Crown" within the calendar year (2000).

Awards and nominations
Year	Organization	Award	Result	Ref.
2000	KBS Music Awards	Grand Prize (Daesang)	Won	
2000	MBC Music Awards	Grand Prize (Daesang)	Won	
2001	MTV Video Music Awards	International Viewer's Choice – MTV Korea	Won	
2001	Mnet Music Video Festival	Most Popular Music Video (Daesang)	Won	
2001	Mnet Music Video Festival	Best Male Group	Nominated	

Music program awards
Program	Date	Ref.
Music Camp	November 25, 2000	
Music Camp	December 9, 2000	
Music Camp	December 16, 2000	
Music Bank	November 30, 2000	
Music Bank	December 7, 2000	
Music Bank	December 14, 2000	
Inkigayo	December 3, 2000	
Inkigayo	December 10, 2000	
Inkigayo	December 17, 2000	

== Covers ==
The song has been covered and performed numerous times in special segments featuring "legendary" hit songs due its status as one of g.o.d's most famous and popular songs. In 2011, Kim Tae-woo, Son Ho-young and Danny Ahn performed the song during the "Legends" segment of the Music Bank special celebrating 600 episodes. Groups who have recently covered the song since g.o.d's reunion include B1A4 (MBC's Gayo Daejejeon) and BtoB (SBS's Inkigayo).

The chorus was sampled as part a mash-up performed by JYP Entertainment artists JB (Got7), Woojin and Bang Chan (Stray Kids) and Nayeon and Jihyo (Twice) for the "JYP Of All Time" special segment during the 2018 KBS Song Festival paying tribute to Park Jin-young's biggest hit songs over the past two decades. Other cover versions include Henry on Mnet's Sing Again, Hera Gu episode 10, where he performed a mash-up with "Road" by g.o.d, and Lee Soo-jung on K-pop Star season 5 round 5.

== Legacy ==
In a 2006 poll conducted by Gallup Korea, 1,500 Koreans aged 13 and above listed their five favorite songs and "Lies" was ranked 22nd out of the top 100 songs named. In a 2016 survey conducted by The Dong-a Ilbo in which thirty music industry experts and nearly 2,000 citizens participated, "Lies" was voted third in the category of the greatest K-pop songs of the past twenty years.
