= Road (g.o.d song) =

Single by g.o.d

from the album Chapter 4
- Language: Korean
- Released: November 15, 2001
- Recorded: 2001
- Genre: K-pop; R&B
- Length: 3:46
- Label: Sidus; Yejeon Media
- Songwriter: Park Jin-young
- Producer: Park Jin-young

G.o.d singles chronology
"One Candle" (2000)	"Road" (2001)	"Letter" (2002)

"Road" (Korean: 길; RR: Gil) is a song performed by South Korean boy band g.o.d. It was the title track of their fourth album Chapter 4, which was released in November 2001 and became their second "million"-selling album. In a 2006 poll conducted by Gallup Korea, 1,500 Koreans aged 13 and above listed their five favorite songs and "Road" was ranked 59th out of the top 100 songs named.

== Background and release ==
The lyrics and music were composed by Park Jin-young. At that time, the group was not managed by his company JYP Entertainment but he worked closely with them as a producer and songwriter. The accompanying soundtrack was also included in the album and was arranged by composer and music producer Bang Si-hyuk, who went on to establish Big Hit Entertainment. According to g.o.d lead vocalist Kim Tae-woo, the song was conceived during a period of uncertainty about their futures, following the massive success of their million-selling third album and its lead track "Lies".

=== Remake ===
The song was featured in the group's 20th anniversary album Then & Now (2019) as one of six songs from previous albums to be remixed and re-recorded. The instrumental track for the new version was arranged by Jeong Dong-hwan of MeloMance. Compared to the simple groove of the original, the new version features a more layered and grander texture. g.o.d do not feature at all and are replaced by solo artists IU and Yang Da-il, former Super Junior-M member Henry and Jo Hyun-ah of indie R&B trio Urban Zakapa. This version was one of several songs from the album which charted. It debuted at #64 in the Gaon Digital Chart before peaking at #14 the following week. It reached #21 on the monthly chart for January.

== Composition ==
The song speaks of a person being unsure of which "road" to take in life and comprises a series of first-person questions pondering about what one values in life and the uncertainty of the path chosen.

"Will I be able to finally smile when I reach the goal?" Even after the song is over you cannot easily answer. [...] The confession in "Road" is just as simple and plain as it is honest and powerful. It is because of the universality of the question that [the song] is loved by many people across generations in Korea.
— Kim Tak-hwan in The Dong-a Ilbo

== Accolades ==
Upon the release of Chapter 4, "Road" became one of g.o.d's most popular and critically acclaimed songs. It received 7 music program awards, including a "Triple Crown" on SBS's Inkigayo (old ranking system), topping the ranking for three weeks in a row, and dominated the #1 rankings for the month of December on MBC's Music Camp (the former incarnation of Show! Music Core). The song also garnered critical acclaim as it was awarded the Daesang (Grand Prize) (Grand Prize) by all three major broadcasting stations in South Korea – KBS, MBC and SBS – at their respective year-end music awards ceremonies, making g.o.d one of the few groups to have been so honored. The album itself also won the "Album of the Year" (Daesang (Grand Prize)) at the 16th Golden Disc Awards, one of the industry's most prestigious awards ceremonies.

Awards and nominations
Year	Organization	Award	Result	Ref.
2001	KBS Music Awards	Grand Prize (Daesang)	Won	
2001	MBC Music Awards	Grand Prize (Daesang)	Won	
2001	SBS Music Awards	Grand Prize (Daesang)	Won	
2002	Mnet Music Video Festival	Best Male Group	Nominated	
2002	Mnet Music Video Festival	Special Jury Prize	Nominated	

Music program awards
Program	Date
Music Camp	December 8, 2001
Music Camp	December 15, 2001
Music Camp	December 22, 2001
Music Camp	December 29, 2001
Inkigayo	December 9, 2001
Inkigayo	December 16, 2001
Inkigayo	December 23, 2001

== Cover versions ==
"Road" has been covered numerous times on various singing competitions and music variety shows. Recent idol groups that have covered the song include B1A4 during a special segment at the 28th Golden Disc Awards honoring past winners. Other artists who have covered the song include Lee Jin-ah (K-pop Star season 4), Henry on Mnet's Sing Again, Hera Gu episode 10 (mash-up with "Lies" by g.o.d), Sandeul & Jo Seon-young (winner of Duet Song Festival episode 5), Kim Tae-woo & "Wolmi-do Little Giant" Park Joo-hyun (winner of Fantastic Duo season 1 episodes 11–12), Goo Jeong-hyun ft. Kim Tae-woo and Son Ho-young (winner of I Can See Your Voice season 3 episode 10), and Henry, Jung Seung-hwan, Lee Su-Hyun, and Sohyang (Begin Again season 4 episode 8).

== In popular culture ==
MBC's partner news portal mbig created a satirical lyric music video using news footage of Kim Jong-un on the journey to Vietnam for the summit and during the meeting with United States President Donald Trump. The original 2001 version was used.

The song was featured in a short film The Gil, which documented four British indie artists' dive into K-pop through remaking "One Candle" and "The Road". Directed by Korean-British Jeon Saet-byeol, the film was produced to commemorate 140 years of diplomatic relations between the United Kingdom and Korea.
