= Chapter 3 (g.o.d album) =

2000 studio album by South Korean group g.o.d

Studio album by g.o.d
- Released: November 3, 2000
- Recorded: 2000
- Studios: Sidus Studio (Gangnam, Seoul); Bay Studio (Seoul); Wave Studio (Mapo, Seoul); Enterprise Studio (Burbank)
- Genres: K-pop; R&B; dance pop
- Length: 46:01
- Labels: Sidus; Synnara Records
- Producers: Park Jin-young; Jung Hoon-tak; Jung Hae-ik

G.o.d chronology
Chapter 2 (1999)	Chapter 3 (2000)	Chapter 4 (2001)

Singles from Chapter 3
- 1. "Lies" Released: November 3, 2000; 2. "One Candle" Released: November 3, 2000; 3. "I Need You" Released: November 3, 2000

Chapter 3 is the third studio album by South Korean pop music group g.o.d. Released on November 3, 2000, it was the first of their million-selling albums and features "Lies" as its title track. A commercial success, the album sold 1,505,162 copies by the end of the year, making it the second best-selling album of 2000 in South Korea. By April 2001, it sold more than 1,824,000 copies.

== Background and release ==
The album features several of g.o.d's most well-known and popular songs, including "Lies", "One Candle" and "Sky Blue Balloon". The song "Sky Blue Balloon" was dedicated to their fans and referred to their fandom color sky blue.

== Critical reception ==
In its review of the album, The Hankyoreh noted that although the overall musical style did not stray from that of the first two albums, the album's appeal lay in the relatable lyrics of the songs, listenable melodies and the members' own natural vocal styles. It also commented that the group's appearance in their reality show g.o.d's Baby Diaries led to the surge in popularity.

== Commercial performance ==
The album sold 600,000 copies within several days and would go on to sell more than 1.8 million copies, making them the first group since Seo Taiji & Boys to surpass the 1.5 million mark. "Lies" ranked number one on multiple music program chart rankings, including Inkigayo, Music Bank, and Music Camp (former version of Show! Music Core) for three consecutive weeks, earning nine music show wins in total. "I Need You" also won four music show wins.

== Accolades ==
Music program awards
Song	Program	Date
"Lies"	Music Camp	November 25, 2000
"Lies"	Music Camp	December 9, 2000
"Lies"	Music Camp	December 16, 2000
"Lies"	Music Bank	November 30, 2000
"Lies"	Music Bank	December 7, 2000
"Lies"	Music Bank	December 14, 2000
"Lies"	Inkigayo	December 3, 2000
"Lies"	Inkigayo	December 10, 2000
"Lies"	Inkigayo	December 17, 2000
"I Need You"	Music Camp	January 27, 2001
"I Need You"	Music Camp	February 3, 2001
"I Need You"	Inkigayo	February 4, 2001
"I Need You"	Inkigayo	February 11, 2001

== Track listing ==
All lyrics and music are written and composed by Park Jin-young, except where noted.

No.	Title	Lyrics	Music	Length
1.	"Fly (intro)" (파리; Pali)		Bae Jin-ryeol (JR Groove)	1:17
2.	"One Candle" (촛불하나; Chotbulhana)			3:31
3.	"I Need You" (니가 필요해; Niga piryohae)			3:24
4.	"Lies" (거짓말; Geojitmal)			4:02
5.	"Come Back" (돌아와줘; Dol-awajwo)		Yoon Seung-hwan; Park Choong-min	3:09
6.	"Dance With Me" (나와 함께 춤을 춰; Nawa hamkke chumeul chwo)			3:57
7.	"Why" (왜; Wae)	Park Jin-young; Bang Si-hyuk	Bang Si-hyuk	3:55
8.	"god Party"	Park Jin-young; Park Joon-hyung; Danny Ahn; Yoon Kye-sang; Son Ho-young; Kim Tae-woo		3:41
9.	"War of Roses" (장미의 전쟁; Jangmi-ui jeonjaeng)		Bang Si-hyuk	3:17
10.	"I Don't Know Love" (난 사랑을 몰라; Nan sarang-eul molra)		JR Groove	4:16
11.	"If the Love is Eternal" (사랑이 영원 하다면; Sarangi yeongwon hadamyeon)		Bang Si-hyuk	3:24
12.	"Sky Blue Balloon" (하늘색 풍선; Haneulsaek pungseon)	Park Jin-young; Park Joon-hyung; Danny Ahn; Yoon Kye-sang; Son Ho-young; Kim Tae-woo	Bang Si-hyuk	3:37
13.	"One Candle" (instrumental)		Park Jin-young; Bang Si-hyuk	3:31
Total length:				46:01

== Credits and personnel ==
g.o.d

- Park Jun-hyung – rapper
- Yoon Kye-sang – vocals
- Danny Ahn – rapper
- Son Ho-young – vocals
- Kim Tae-woo – vocals

Session

- Greg Curtis – keyboard instrument (track 2)
- Seunghwan Yoon – keyboard instrument (track 5)
- Seunghwan Lee – keyboard instrument (track 7, 12)
- Bae Jin-yeol – string arrangement (track 1), keyboard instrument (9)
- Chunho Ham, Stan the Guitarman – other (track 4)
- Wizard – bass guitar (track 2)
- Shin Hyeon-kwon – bass guitar (track 7, 12)
- Yang Hyeon, Bang Bang-ho, Park Jong-hong, Kim Hye-eun, Kim Woo-hyun, Hwang Mi-ryeong – violin
- Soyoung Kim – cello
- Dongha Kim – trumpet
- Choi Yong-yong – trombone
- Jang Hyo-seok – saxophone
- Fill in the Blank, Kristle Murden, Yvonne Williams, Sueanne Carwell – backing vocals
- Jun Ji-hyun – narration (track 4, 10)
- fan god – narration (track 12)

Staff

- Hoon-tak Jeong, Hae-ik Jeong – producers
- Park Jin-young – producer, keyboard (track 9)
- g.o.d. – co-producer
- Bang Si-hyuk – co-producer, keyboard (track 9), string arrangement (7, 12)
- Kim Soon-in/Kim Chan-seok (Sidus Studio), Lee Jin-won/Kim Jin-gu (Bay Studio), Namgoong Jin (Wave Studio) – recording
- Dave Pensado (Enterprise Studios) – recording, mixing (track 2, 4)
- Jihoon Seong (King Studio) – mixing
- Lim Chang-deok (Booming Studio) – mixing (track 7)
- Eddy Schreyer (Oasis Mastering Studio) – mastering
- Park Pil-won, Park Seong-jun, Kim Bo-hyung – managers
- Hyun-kyung Hwang, Mi-ra Jeong – promotion
- Andy Yoo (Jaedeok Yoo) – art and style director
- Eun-jin Kim, Seong-jin Kwon, Hyun-ha Lee, Ae-seon Seol – stylists
- Sidus – executive producer
- Go Young-jun, Han Jae-hoon – photography
- Jiyeon Kim, Heesu Byun – album design
- Myungjin Art – printing

== Charts and sales ==
=== Monthly charts ===
Chart (2000)	Peak position
South Korean Albums (RIAK)	1

=== Year-end charts ===
Chart (2000)	Position
South Korean Albums (RIAK)	2

=== Sales ===
Region	Sales
South Korea (RIAK)	1,824,278

== See also ==
- List of best-selling albums in South Korea
