= Chapter 4 (g.o.d album) =

Studio album by g.o.d
- Released: November 15, 2001
- Recorded: 2001
- Studios: Sidus Studio (Gangnam, Seoul); Bay Studio (Seoul); Wave Studio (Mapo, Seoul)
- Genres: K-pop; R&B; dance pop
- Length: 49:14
- Language: Korean
- Labels: Sidus; Yejeon Media
- Producers: Park Jin-young; Jung Hoon-tak; Jung Hae-ik

G.o.d chronology
Chapter 3 (2000)	Chapter 4 (2001)	Chapter 5: Letter (2002)

Singles from Chapter 4
- 1. "Road" Released: November 15, 2001

Chapter 4 is the fourth album of South Korean pop music group g.o.d. It was released through Sidus and Yejeon Media on November 15, 2001. It was the group's second record to sell over 1 million copies.

== Critical reception ==
The album was not only popular and well received by fans, it was the group's most critically acclaimed album to date. It won the Daesang (Grand Prize) for the Album of the Year at the Golden Disc Awards, becoming only the second idol group to win one of the industry's most prestigious awards.

Various reviews by major newspapers noted that the album displayed a more introspective and mature side of the group, with the album art likewise reflecting a more serious theme compared to that of the third album. The Korea JoongAng Daily concluded that "with R&B, hip-hop and ballads all blended together, the new release ought to satisfy the band's many fans."

== Commercial performance ==
Chapter 4 sold 1,441,209 copies within a month of its release. Although the total sales figures dipped slightly compared to Chapter 3, Chapter 4 still currently holds the record for the best selling album (not including a repackaged edition) within a month in the history of the Recording Industry Association of Korea and its successor organizations, including the present-day Korea Music Content Industry Association which compiles data for the Circle Chart.

== Awards and nominations ==
"Road" and "The Place Where You Should Be" won successive "Triple Crowns" on Inkigayo and also ranked number one on Music Camp (predecessor of Show! Music Core).

Year	Award	Category	Result	Ref.
2001	Golden Disc Awards	Album Daesang (Grand Prize)	Won	
2001	Golden Disc Awards	Album Bonsang (Main Prize)	Won	

== Track listing ==
No.	Title	Lyrics	Music	Length
1.	"Intro"	Park Jin-young	Park Jin-young	1:17
2.	"Road" (길; Gil)	Park Jin-young	Park Jin-young	3:46
3.	"Again" (다시; Dashi)	Park Jin-young	Park Jin-young	4:43
4.	"Fool" (바보; Babo)	Park Jin-young	Park Jin-young; Bang Si-hyuk	3:57
5.	"The Place Where You Should Be" (니가 있어야 할 곳; Niga iteoya hal got)	Park Jin-young	Park Jin-young; Bae Jin-ryeol (JR Groove)	3:40
6.	"Sad Love" (슬픈 사랑; Seulpeun sarang)	Park Joon-hyung; Danny Ahn; Yoon Kye-sang; Son Ho-young; Kim Tae-woo	Kim Do-hoon (ko)	3:46
7.	"I Know" (나는 알아; Naneun ara)	Park Jin-young	Park Jin-young; Bang Si-hyuk	4:05
8.	"You Don't Know" (모르죠; Moreujyo)	Park Jin-young; Bang Si-hyuk	Bang Si-hyuk	4:20
9.	"I Have A Man (narration by Kim Jung-eun)" (난 남자가 있어; Nan namjaga it-eo)	Park Jin-young	Park Jin-young	4:05
10.	"Let's Go (featuring Lim Jeong-hee)" (가자; Gaja)	Park Jin-young	Park Jin-young	4:10
11.	"134-14"	Park Joon-hyung; Danny Ahn; Yoon Kye-sang; Son Ho-young; Kim Tae-woo	Danny Ahn	3:28
12.	"The Reason Why I Can't Leave" (떠나지 못하는 이유; Tteonaji mothaneun iyu)	Park Jin-young	Park Jin-young	4:10
13.	"Road" (instrumental)			3:46
Total length:				49:14

== Credits and personnel ==
Credits are adapted from the album liner notes.

g.o.d

- Park Jun-hyung – rapper
- Yoon Kye-sang – vocals
- Danny Ahn – rapper
- Son Ho-young – vocal
- Kim Tae-woo – vocal

Session

- Taeyoon Lee – bass guitar (track 3)
- Jeong Yu-seok – scratch (track 7)
- Seungwoo Jeon – backing vocal (track 2, 3, 5, 6)
- Seongho Kang – backing vocal (track 2, 7, 11)
- Fill in the blanks – backing vocal (track 2, 4, 8, 10, 11)
- Sam Lee – other (track 3, 5, 6, 10)
- Hong Jun-ho – other (track 3)
- Erich Bulling – other (track 9)

Staff

- Hoon-tak Jeong, Hae-ik Jeong – producers
- Sidus & Content Group – executive producer
- Park Pil-won – co-producer
- Park Jin-young – producer, keyboard, backing vocalist (track 2, 7)
- Bang Si-hyuk – co-producer, keyboard, guitar (track 4), programming
- Heejung Park – acoustic music producer
- Bae Jin-ryeol – keyboard, programming
- Dohoon Kim – keyboard, programming
- Kim Soon-in & Kim Chan-seok (Sidus Studio), Lee Jin-won (Bay Studio), Nam Gung-jin & Cho Chang-hee (Wave Studio) – recording
- Ahn Jong-hwa, Park Jun-hyung, Jang Ji-bok – assistive technology
- Jihoon Seong (Bay Studio & Dream Factory Studio) – mixing (track 1, 3, 5, 7–9, 12)
- Seungwook Ko (Lead Sound) – mixing (track 6, 10, 11)
- Dave "Hard Drive" Pensado (Enterprise Studios) – mixing (track 2, 4)
- Eddy Schryer (Oasis Mastering Studio) – mastering
- Seongjun Park, Jun Oh – manager
- Andy Yoo (Jaedeok Yoo) – art and style director
- Eunjin Kim, Seongjin Kwon, Hyeonha Lee, Jeonghee Park, Kyungmi Ha, Injin Jeon, Eongyeom Kim, Sechang Kwon – stylists
- Kim Il-kwon – photography
- Jiyeon Kim – album design
- Myungjin Art – printing

== Charts and sales ==
=== Monthly charts ===
Chart (2001)	Peak position
South Korean Albums (RIAK)	1

=== Year-end charts ===
Chart (2001)	Position
South Korean Albums (RIAK)	2

=== Sales ===
Region	Sales
South Korea (RIAK)	1,738,082

== See also ==
- List of best-selling albums in South Korea
