= Chapter 8 (g.o.d album) =

Studio album by g.o.d
- Released: July 8, 2014; October 22, 2014 (reissue)
- Genres: K-pop; R&B; Dance pop
- Length: 52:32 (original)
- Language: Korean
- Labels: SidusHQ, CJ E&M
- Producers: Duble Sidekick; Kim Tae-woo

G.o.d chronology
| Into the Sky (2005) | Chapter 8 (2014) | Then & Now (2019) |

Alternate cover
- "Thanks" edition (reissue) cover

Singles from Chapter 8
- 1. "The Lone Duckling" Released: May 7, 2014; 2. "Sky Blue Promise" Released: July 1, 2014

Chapter 8 is the eighth studio album by South Korean pop music group g.o.d. It was released in July 2014 to celebrate the 15th anniversary of their debut and mark their reunion as a five-man group after nearly a decade of hiatus. The repackaged edition was released in October and features an additional CD containing a new single "Wind" (바람). Chapter 8 was awarded Album of the Year at the 2014 Melon Music Awards.

== Overview ==
The album contains 14 tracks, three of which are instrumentals. The introductory track is an orchestral medley of the group's most famous hits and was recorded by the Czech National Symphony Orchestra. The songs sampled in the medley are only from the first five albums released by g.o.d as a quintet. The first full track "An Ordinary Day" was originally released after Yoon Kye-sang's departure and was re-arranged by the original composer and re-recorded to include him. It was intentionally termed the "original version" as the re-recorded version was sung by the "complete" five-man group, referencing Yoon's return.

"Sky Blue Promise" was the second single pre-released and samples and references two of the group's most famous hits from their third album: "One Candle" and "Sky Blue Balloon" (하늘색 풍선). The title is a reference to their fandom color sky blue. The song follows the humorous style of "Sky Blue Balloon" and satirizes their own journey from newly debuted young pop stars to middle-aged experienced "seniors" (Korean: 선배; RR: seonbae) in the entertainment industry, referencing Park Jin-young ("JYP") whom they worked with closely during their early days and the reality show Dad! Where Are We Going?, a nod to member Kim Tae-woo becoming a father.

"Saturday Night" was one of three songs for which a music video was released. It alludes to two of the group's hit songs, "Friday Night" and "The Place Where You Should Be" (니가 있어야 할곳), especially the funk rhythm and lyrics. At the end of the video, the members dance the choreography of various past hit songs.

== Release ==
Two songs from the album were pre-released as digital singles. "The Lone Duckling" was released on May 7, 2014. All proceeds from the song were donated to those affected by the Sewol ferry accident. "Sky Blue Balloon" was released at noon on July 1 (KST). The music videos for "Sky Blue Promise", "Saturday Night" and "The Story of Our Lives" were uploaded on YouTube by CJ E&M and each has since recorded over a million views. The full album was released at midnight (KST) on July 8.

The repackaged edition was released on October 22, following the conclusion of their national tour. It contains a 50-page photo book of behind-the-scenes and shots from the national tour and an additional single entitled "Wind", which was written by Yoon Kye-sang and dedicated to the fans. The music video was uploaded on YouTube on October 23 and contained behind-the-scenes footage and clips from the concerts throughout the tour.

== Critical reception ==
YesAsia's YumCha! picked the album for its list of Best Asian Albums of 2014 and its review described the album as an "eminently listenable pop album that appeals to both longtime fans of g.o.d and newer fans to K-pop." Critics have noted that the album had a nostalgic feel as the group chose to retain their signature blend of R&B and rap in the new songs and praised the group for choosing to retain their unique sound rather than follow current trends, thus being able to appeal to both nostalgic older fans as well as newer K-pop fans seeking more variety in genres and musical styles. Several English-language K-pop blogs have opined that the group have proven through their new album that they have not lost their unique sound despite the long hiatus and Hellokpop.com added that while the songs were musically similar to their past hits, "They don’t look wistfully towards the glory years; instead, they aim to keep their trademark down-to-earth, in-touch image while lyrically recognizing their years and celebrating the reunion."

== Commercial performance ==
As soon it was released, Chapter 8 topped the local charts, including major sites such as Melon, Genie and others, earning the group the Album of the Year award at the Melon Music Awards. It debuted at #2 in the Gaon Album Chart and was ranked at #5 for the month of July and #45 for the year 2014.

"The Lone Duckling" won the Song of the Year award for the month of May at the Gaon Chart Music Awards after it achieved an "all kill" in the digital charts for that month and topped the K-pop Hot 100. "Sky Blue Promise" immediately topped nine local digital charts upon its release, remaining one of the top 5 most downloaded songs for the month of July. It also finished second in the Inkigayo rankings for July 13 despite the fact that g.o.d did not promote at any music programs. The album's title track "The Story of Our Lives" topped the digital charts just hours after the album's release. Excluding the two pre-released tracks, all other tracks in the album charted in the Gaon Digital Chart for the month of July, with two debuting in the top 10 the week of the album's release.

== Track listing ==
| No. | Title | Lyrics | Music | Length |
|---|---|---|---|---|
| 1. | "5+4+1+5=15" (instrumental medley) | | | 4:51 |
| 2. | "An Ordinary Day" (original version) (보통날; Botongnal) | Park Jin-young | Kwon Tae-eun | 4:39 |
| 3. | "Sky Blue Promise" (하늘색 약속; Haneulsaek yaksok) | Duble Sidekick; Danny Ahn | Duble Sidekick | 4:04 |
| 4. | "Saturday Night" | Duble Sidekick | Lee Won-ho; Kim Tae-woo | 3:50 |
| 5. | "Five Men and a Kiddo" (아저씨와 메건리) | | | 1:36 |
| 6. | "The Story of Our Lives (feat. Megan Lee)" (우리가 사는 이야기; Uriga saneun iyagi) | Duble Sidekick | Duble Sidekick; Tenjo and Taksuko | 4:37 |
| 7. | "Smile" | Duble Sidekick; Ahn | Duble Sidekick | 4:08 |
| 8. | "Stand Up" | Black Eyed Pilseung; Ahn; Son Ho-young | Black Eyed Pilseung | 3:31 |
| 9. | "Sing for Me (feat. IU)" (노래 불러줘요; Norae bulleojwoyo) | Duble Sidekick; Soul Twins | Chancellor (ko); Soul Twins | 4:08 |
| 10. | "I Like It" (난 좋아; Nan joh-ah) | Ahn; Kiggen; Hanhae | Ahn; Kiggen | 3:36 |
| 11. | "G'swag" (신사의 품격; Sinsa-ui pumgyeok) | Kim | Kim; Red Rocket; Genneo | 3:21 |
| 12. | "The Lone Duckling" (미운오리새끼; Miun orisaekki) | Duble Sidekick; Ahn | Duble Sidekick | 4:24 |
| 13. | "Saturday Night" (instrumental) | | | 3:50 |
| 14. | "The Story of Our Lives" (instrumental) | | | 4:37 |
| Total length: | | | | 52:32 |

"Thanks" edition
| No. | Title | Lyrics | Music | Length |
|---|---|---|---|---|
| 1. | "Wind" (바람; Baram) | Yoon Kye-sang | Jam Factory | 4:05 |
| 2. | "Wind" (instrumental) | | Jam Factory | 4:05 |

== Charted songs ==
| Title | Peak positions^{1} | | | Notes |
| Title | KOR Weekly | KOR Monthly | KOR Yearly^{2} | Notes |
|---|---|---|---|---|
| "The Lone Duckling" (미운오리새끼) | 1 | 1 | 41 | |
| "Sky Blue Promise" (하늘색 약속) | 2 | 3 | 71 | |
| "The Story of Our Lives" (우리가 사는 이야기) | 3 | 21 | — | |
| "Sing for Me" (노래 불러줘요) | 9 | 29 | — | |
| "Saturday Night" | 13 | 34 | — | |
| "An Ordinary Day" (보통날) | 19 | 46 | — | |
| "Stand Up" | 23 | 66 | — | |
| "Smile" | 26 | 74 | — | |
| "I Like It" (난 좋아) | 27 | 72 | — | |
| "G'Swag" (신사의 품격) | 28 | 93 | — | |
| 5+4+1+5=15 | 32 | — | | |
| "Wind" (바람) | 12 | 47 | — | |

- ^{^1} Chart information is from the Gaon Digital Chart only.
- ^{^2} Chart information is for the Year 2014 only.
