= Love and Remember =

Single by g.o.d

from the album Chapter 2
- Language: Korean
- Released: November 25, 1999
- Genre: R&B
- Length: 4:25
- Label: EBM, Synnara Records
- Composer: Park Jin-young
- Lyricist: Park Jin-young

G.o.d singles chronology
"To Mother" (1999)	"Love and Remember" (1999)	"Sorrow" (1999)

"Love and Remember" (Korean: 사랑해 그리고 기억해; RR: Saranghae geurigo gieokhae), also translated as "Love and Memories", is a song performed by the South Korean boy band g.o.d. It was the promoted song from their second studio album Chapter 2.

== Overview ==
The song begins with a trademark spoken narration by main rapper Danny Ahn dedicating the song to "anyone who has had to let go of someone they love". The lyrics are sung from the first-person perspective of one who has had to let go of a lover and is reminiscing about the happy memories they once shared.

== Reception ==
The song would garner the group's first ever #1 win on a music program. It won first place on both Inkigayo and Music Bank.

== Controversy ==
In October 2002 the Taiwanese Mandopop boy band F4 and their label Sony Music Taiwan encountered controversy when South Korean media noted the similarities between the "Love and Remember" and F4's song "Everywhere" (你不愛我愛誰?) from the album Meteor Rain. Park filed a lawsuit against Sony Music Taiwan, stating that the song had been remade without his permission. Sony Music Taiwan disputed the case on the grounds that they had purchased the rights from Universal Music, as "Love and Remember" was partly based on Curtis McKonly's arrangement of the Christmas carol "The First Noel". The case was eventually settled out of court when Park was paid compensation by Sony Music Taiwan as the group had used Park's arrangement of the song.

== In popular culture ==
"Love and Remember" was used as the background music in the Drama Special episode "Pitch-black Darkness", which starred g.o.d member Danny Ahn and in the tvN television series Reply 1994.

== Notable cover versions ==
Park Jin-young covered the song with Jackson Wang of GOT7 and g.o.d member Joon Park in the Christmas special of the SBS reality show Roommate. The song has been covered twice on the program Immortal Songs: Singing the Legend, by girl group GFriend for the g.o.d special and by Yoo Hwe-seung of N.Flying for the JYP special. It was also chosen as the encore song sung by all performers at the 2017 KBS Song Festival.
