= Son Ho-young =

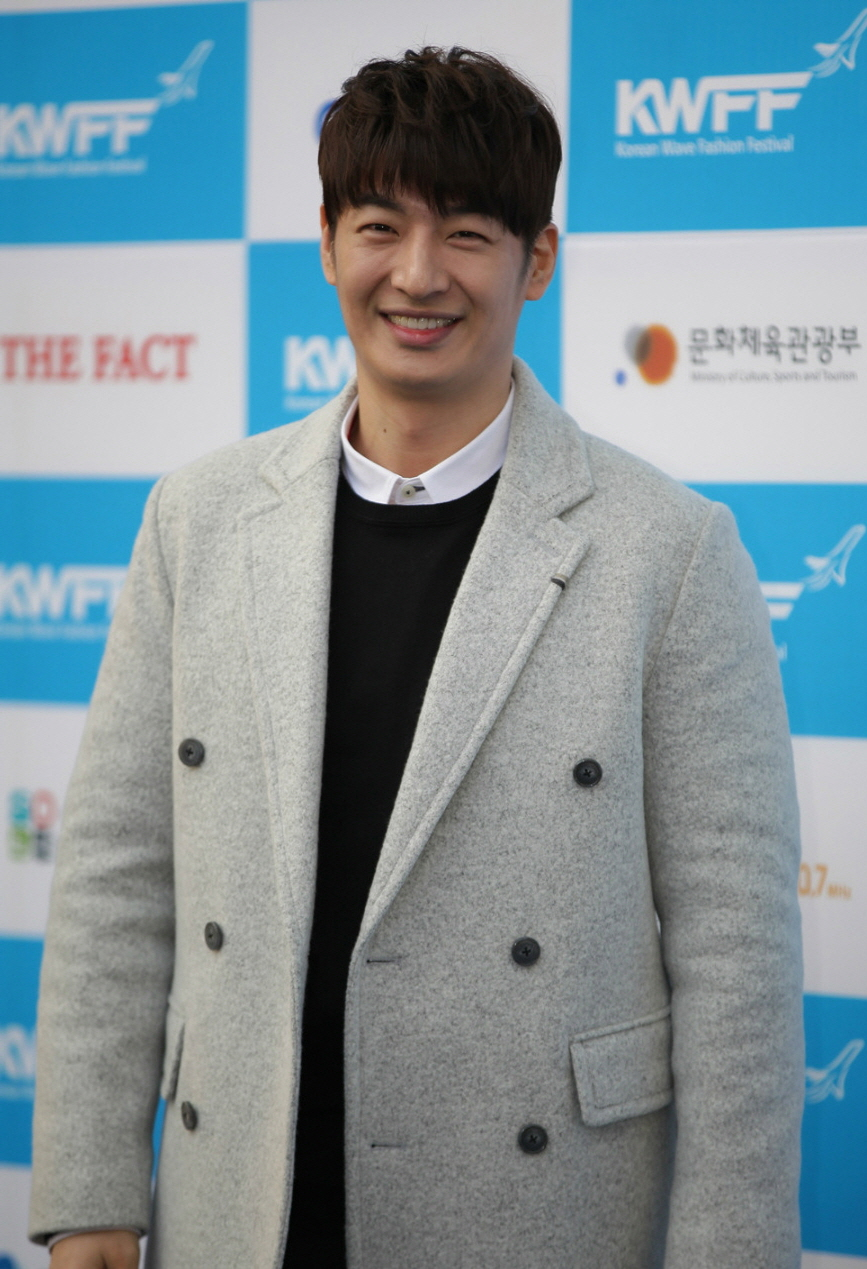
- Son in December 2015
- Born: March 26, 1980 (age 46); New Jersey, United States
- Other name: Andrew Son
- Musical career
- Genres: K-pop; R&B
- Occupations: Singer; actor
- Years active: 1999–present
- Label: GEMSTONE E&M
- Member of: g.o.d
- Website: sonhoyoung.co.kr

Korean name
- Hangul: 손호영
- Hanja: 孫昊永
- RR: Son Hoyeong
- MR: Son Hoyŏng

Son Ho-young (Korean: 손호영; born March 26, 1980) is a South Korean-American singer and musical actor based in South Korea. Best known as a member of g.o.d, he made his debut in the entertainment industry with the group in 1999 and pursued a solo career as a singer and musical theater actor after the group went on hiatus. He has also regularly appeared on Immortal Songs: Singing the Legend and other music variety shows.

== Early life ==
Son is the younger of two children and was born in the United States to Korean parents who are naturalized American citizens. They moved to South Korea, but their parents divorced and the siblings remained in South Korea with their father, a university professor and amateur singer; mother and son only reconnected when he was an adult.

Son was elementary and middle schoolmates with Kang Sung-hoon and Ko Ji-yong, both of whom went on to form Sechs Kies.

Despite growing up in a musical home, he showed no inclination towards a career in the music industry until he was a teenager. He had a difficult relationship with his father in adolescence and would run away from home to escape being disciplined for misbehavior, finally leaving home for good at age seventeen and only returning after nearly three years. Son later stated that he had been living on the streets when he befriended future g.o.d bandmate Danny Ahn and eventually auditioned for a project group that Ahn's cousin Park Joon-hyung was forming. He returned home after his debut to reconcile with his father and present him with a copy of g.o.d's debut album.

== Career ==
=== 1999–2005: Early years and g.o.d ===
Son, Danny Ahn, Shoo and Kim Hwan-sung were initially part of a mixed-gender project group but it fell through when Shoo signed with S.M. Entertainment; she went on to debut as a member of the girl group S.E.S. while Kim was recruited as the final member of NRG. Ahn was recruited by his cousin Park Joon-hyung to join his project group under EBM and persuaded Son to audition. Yoon Kye-sang and Kim Sun-a were also recruited but the latter left to pursue acting and was replaced by Kim Tae-woo. With Park Jin-young as their producer and primary songwriter, the group eventually became a five-man boy band g.o.d, short for "Groove Over Dose", and made their debut in January 1999. Despite the lukewarm response to their debut performance, g.o.d would go on to be one of the most popular boy bands of the early 2000s. Son was both a rapper and vocalist but was mainly given rap parts in the first and second albums. He was gradually given more singing parts, as seen in the third album.

Son and the other original members were managed by SidusHQ, the successor company of EBM. In 2003 their group contract with SidusHQ expired and they moved to Park Jin-young's agency JYP Entertainment. Son and Park signed individual contracts with JYP Entertainment while Yoon and Ahn remained with SidusHQ.

=== 2006–2013: Solo career ===
With Yoon having left the group in 2004, the four remaining members performed as g.o.d for the final time in December 2005 before going their separate ways. Son did not renew his contract with JYP Entertainment and signed with Lobe Entertainment, which was later absorbed into LOEN Entertainment. He released his first album YES, which contained the singles "I Know", "Cry" (Korean: 운다; RR: Unda), "YES", and "Love Brings Separation" (사랑은 이별을 데리고 오다; Sarangeun ibyeoreul derigo oda). The album won the Bonsang award for Best Artist (Judges' Choice) at the 21st Golden Disc Awards and "Love Brings Separation" placed #1 in the rankings for January 4, 2007, on Mnet's M Countdown and for January 14 on Inkigayo. Son has since re-released the album containing a DVD of the album's music videos. He continued to periodically collaborate with former bandmate Kim Tae-woo, often performing with one another or appearing on variety shows together.

In 2007, Son released a single album entitled Sweet Love; the lead song is "My Heart in Heaven" (하늘에 내 마음이; Haneure nae maeumi). He performed the song with Lee Min-woo of Shinhwa during the "Special Stage" segment of Music Bank, in which two singers or idol groups would cover one another's songs. Under the Sea concert DVD was released the same year. In late 2008, Son released his second album, Returns.

Son performed as a soloist at the Korean Music Festival in 2008 and 2009 and was also MC for the 2009 and 2012 editions. During the 2012 edition he briefly reunited with three of his former g.o.d bandmates for a special performance. He was also a regular participant in Immortal Songs: Singing the Legend. He won an episode for the first time in episode 75 (broadcast on November 17, 2012).

In February 2010, with Kim Tae-woo having been discharged from the military, the duo toured overseas together for the first time. They held six concerts in Chicago, Seattle and Vancouver. Son was one of three former JYP Entertainment artists, the others being Kim and their close friend Rain, invited to perform at the first JYP Nation concert TEAMPLAY held at the Olympic Gymnastics Arena that December.

On November 10, 2011, Son released his second mini album U-TURN. The promoted single "Pretty But Hateful" (예쁘고 미웠다; Yeppeugo miwotda) featured rapper Bizzy, best known as a member of pioneer hip hop group Drunken Tiger, and peaked at #72 in the Gaon Digital Chart. The music video starred Suzy of miss A. The album was well-received critically and was featured on Mnet's Pick. From November 25, 2011, to January 29, 2012, Son starred in the musical Fame along with Eunhyuk of Super Junior, Tiffany of Girls' Generation, Go Eun Seong, Kim Chan Ho, Shin Ui Jeong, Lina of The Grace, Choi Ju Ri, KoN and Kim Jung-mo of TRAX.

In 2013, Son participated and won in MasterChef Korea Celebrity alongside other Korean celebrities, Seo Hye-jeong, Lee Kye-in, Shin Eun-jung, Kim Sung-soo, Tony An, Shin Bong-sun, Hwayobi, Fei (Miss A), Henry (Super Junior-M) and Jiyul (Dal Shabet).

=== 2014–present: g.o.d reunion and other activities ===
In early 2014, Son came back to the entertainment industry after a 1-year hiatus, joining O'live TV's Share House as his first appearance on TV since 2013. On July 24 he co-hosted the M Countdown 10th anniversary special with Moon Hee-jun and Lee Hong-gi.

g.o.d was officially reunited as quintet when Yoon Kye-sang agreed to rejoin the group. They re-signed a group contract with their former agency SidusHQ, which owns their group name trademark and currently manages their group activities, although each member remained with their individual agencies. After releasing their eighth studio album, they embarked on their 15th anniversary nation-wide tour beginning on July 12, 2014. They largely concentrate on releasing new material and holding live concerts rather than promoting on music programs to allow individual members to concurrently maintain their solo careers.

Son recorded the ballad "One Day" (하루만; Haruman), one of the soundtracks for the tvN drama series Marriage, Not Dating. It was first played during the closing credits at the end of episode 8, which aired on July 26, and the accompanying music video uploaded later that week by CJ E&M. The single peaked at #33 on the Gaon Digital Chart. He also collaborated with Danny Ahn to record their version of the song. In between g.o.d's reunion concerts, he made a guest appearance at his long-time friend Baek Ji-young's concert in Daegu and sang Taecyeon's part in "My Ear's Candy" (내 귀에 캔디). He also featured in Natthew's single "Love Will Be Ok" and its music video, which were both released in November 2014. The week after its release to little fanfare, the single immediately peaked at #25 in the Gaon Social Chart. He was a guest judge on No.Mercy, a survival program launched by Mnet and Starship Entertainment in 2015; the seven of the remaining contestants would debut as Monsta X.

On May 23, 2016, Son released his fifth mini album, entitled May, I, to mark his tenth year as a solo artist. The music video for the title track "My Weak Point" (나의 약점; Naui yakjeom) was uploaded on CJ E&M's YouTube channel. It debuted at #8 on the Gaon Album Chart and remained in the top 100 for the months of May and June. The repackaged album, which included an additional new single "None Like You" (너 같은 사람 없어; Neo gateun saram eopseo), was released in October.

Son returned to musical theater for much of the latter half of 2016. He was double-cast as Dr. Rieux in Peste, the translated musical adaptation of Albert Camus's novel The Plague. Featuring music by K-pop legend Seo Tai-ji, the musical premiered on July 20, 2016. In December 2016 he was cast as the protagonist in the musical Geumgang 1894, which was based on the Donghak Peasant Revolution.

Son renewed his contract with his current agency MMO Entertainment, a subsidiary label of CJ E&M, in May 2017. He was one of eight guest artistes featured in his bandmate Kim Tae-woo's sixth solo album T-WITH, which was released in June 2017. From November 2017 to February 2018, Son was double-cast as Chad/Elvis in the jukebox musical All Shook Up, the third time he has taken the role. In between his performances, he held a series of joint concerts with Kim Tae-woo, the first time they have ever held a concert together domestically, over three days in Seoul and Busan. In January 2018 it was announced that he would be joining the cast of the musical The Three Musketeers, which ran from March to May, for its tenth anniversary run.

Son put his solo activities on hold for the latter half of 2018 due to g.o.d preparing for a series of projects celebrating the 20th anniversary of their debut. He was the producer for the concerts, which took place in Seoul, Busan and Daegu over six days. The anniversary album was released on January 10, 2019, and Son produced the ninth track, a remixed and recorded version of the song "You Don't Know" (모르죠) from their fourth album.

On August 1, via Instagram, Son and Kim announced that they were collaborating as a project duo under the name HoooW (호우), a portmanteau combining one character from each of their given names. As HoooW, they have appeared on Immortal Songs: Singing the Legend and You Hee-yeol's Sketchbook and performed as guests at Psy's summer concerts. On August 16, they released the digital single "Game Over" (친구는 이제 끝내기로 해; Chinguneun ije kkeunnaegiro hae).

In April 2020, Son was announced as part of the cast for the new musical adaptation of the popular drama Another Miss Oh. He was triple-cast in the male lead role of Park Do-kyung, who was portrayed by Eric Mun in the drama. His performance received rave reviews from both the audience and critics. The musical was a box office success and also quickly became a trending topic on the internet, with a 9.5/10 rating on Naver's ticket booking portal and ranked by netizens as the number 1 musical they would bring their family to watch. Son was cast in the musical Chunhyang is Alive (춘향은 살아있다), a modern interpretation of the pansori Chunhyangga. It was commissioned to commemorate the 90th anniversary of Namwon's Chunhyang Festival. Due to COVID-19-related restrictions, it was performed without an audience and live streamed on YouTube on September 11.

From August 2019 until January 2023, Son and Ahn have co-hosted a radio-style talk show g.o.d's Lunch Attack which aired on Naver's streaming app Naver NOW. at noon on weekdays.

On June 11, 2021, Son signed an exclusive contract with Beat Interactive.

On March 26, 2023, he held a fan meeting 'MARCH, HO YOUNG' to coincide with his birthday.

== Personal life ==
In 2000, Son and three of his bandmates were injured in a car accident on the Yeongdong Expressway. He was the most seriously injured and required treatment in hospital. It was reported in March 2006, after g.o.d discontinued group activities, that Son had undergone surgery on his right knee as it had never fully recovered since the accident and that he had been performing throughout the god is Back National Tour while on painkillers and delayed treatment.

Son's older sister is actress and VJ Son Jung-min (ko). They also have a much younger half-sister from their father's second marriage. Son and his older sister both hold American citizenship as they were born in the United States to Korean parents who were naturalized American citizens.

His citizenship became the subject of controversy when his father's estranged second wife revealed in 2005 at a press conference that the former had recently given up his Korean citizenship and claimed that he had done so to evade mandatory military service. Son clarified that he had been given Korean citizenship due to an administrative error and had returned his passport at the request of the Immigration Office to correct the error. He was never eligible for Korean nationality due to the fact that he was born overseas to parents who did not hold Korean citizenship and thus did not meet the requirements.

On May 21, 2013, police found the body of a woman in Son's car. They discovered that the woman was his girlfriend, who had borrowed his car and then committed suicide in it. Son's company stated that the suicide had nothing to do with her relationship to Son. Son attempted to commit suicide following his girlfriend's death, on the morning of May 24, 2013. According to police, at 4:36 am, Son parked his car at a parking lot near Onnuri Community Church, Seoul and attempted to commit suicide using the same method as his girlfriend, by lighting butane gas inside his car. The car caught on fire, and as the singer tried to back away from it, a passerby noticed the fumes coming out of the car and called the police for help. He was then rushed to the hospital and was treated immediately, incurring no long-term damage to his health.

== Lyrics and composition ==
Year	Song	Artist	Album	Note
1999	"Say g.o.d"	g.o.d	Chapter 2	lyrics co-written with Park Jin-young, Park Joon-hyung, Yoon Kye-sang, Danny Ahn and Kim Tae-woo
2000	"g.o.d Party"	g.o.d	Chapter 3	lyrics co-written with Park Jin-young, Park Joon-hyung, Yoon Kye-sang, Danny Ahn and Kim Tae-woo
2000	"Sky Blue Balloon" (하늘색 풍선)	g.o.d	Chapter 3	lyrics co-written with Park Jin-young, Park Joon-hyung, Yoon Kye-sang, Danny Ahn and Kim Tae-woo
2001	"Sad Love" (슬픈사랑)	g.o.d	Chapter 4	lyrics co-written with Park Joon-hyung, Yoon Kye-sang, Danny Ahn and Kim Tae-woo
2001	"134-14"	g.o.d	Chapter 4	lyrics co-written with Park Joon-hyung, Yoon Kye-sang, Danny Ahn and Kim Tae-woo
2002	"Us" (우리)	g.o.d	Chapter 5: Letter	lyrics and music
2006	"Love Brings Separation" (사랑은 이별을 데리고 오다)	Son Ho-young	Yes	lyrics
2006	"Happy Virus" (해피바이러스)	Son Ho-young	Yes	lyrics co-written with Park Seon Ju
2008	"I Know"	Son Ho-young	Returns	lyrics
2008	"가시덤불"	Son Ho-young	Returns	lyrics co-written with Noru (ko)
2008	"Beautiful Day"	Son Ho-young	Returns	lyrics
2014	"Stand Up"	g.o.d	Chapter 8	lyrics co-written with Black Eyed Pilseung and Danny Ahn

== Filmography ==
=== Television ===
Year	Work	Role	Notes/Ref.
2010	Becoming a Billionaire	Ha Joon-tae	cameo
2012	Salamander Guru and The Shadows	Kim Shi-hoo	cameo
2013	Pure Love	Son Dae-ri	Supporting
2016	Thumping Spike	Kim Ki Joon	Main
2021	We're Family	Cast Member	
2022	Groom's Class	New groom candidate	

=== Web shows ===
Year	Title	Role	Ref.
2021	Hoyoung and Swing Girls	Host	

== Theater ==
Year	Title	Role	Ref.
2021–2022	Fantastic Fairy Tale	war clown	
2022	Again, Oh Hae-Young	Park Do-kyung	

== Awards and nominations ==
Year	Award	Category	Work	Result
2006	Golden Disc Awards	Disc Bonsang (Judges' Choice)	YES	Won
2006	Seoul Music Awards	Bonsang Awards	—	Won
2008	Golden Disc Awards	Popularity Award	—	Won
