= G.o.d =

South Korean boy band

g.o.d
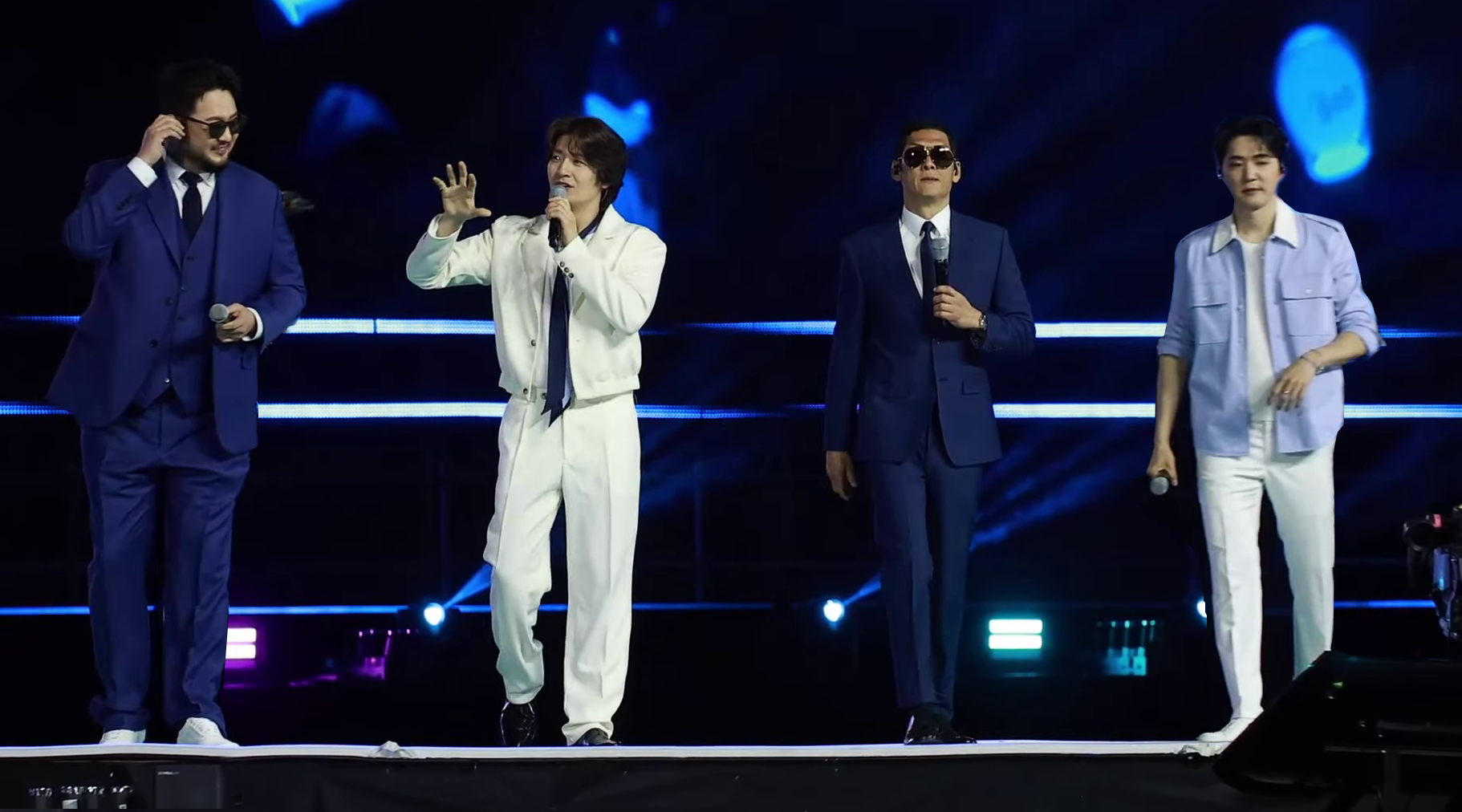
- g.o.d in 2025

Background information
- Origin: South Korea
- Genres: K-pop; R&B
- Years active: 1999–2005; 2014–present
- Labels: SidusHQ; JYP; CJ E&M; Kakao M; Synnara
- Formerly of: JYP Nation
- Members: Park Joon-hyung; Yoon Kye-sang; Danny Ahn; Son Ho-young; Kim Tae-woo

g.o.d (Korean: 지오디; RR: ji-o-di; acronym for Groove Over Dose) is a South Korean boy band formed by SidusHQ. Debuting in 1999, the group became one of the most popular boy bands of the early 2000s in South Korea. The members had gone on to solo careers in the entertainment industry after indefinitely discontinuing group activity in 2005 following the departure of a member. However, they regrouped as a quintet and made a comeback in July 2014. Although the group is largely known for their "storytelling" lyrical style and signature blend of R&B and rap, their repertoire features a diverse array of genres ranging from hip hop to funk.

As one of the best-selling artists in South Korea prior to the digital era, they are one of the few idol groups to have more than one album become a "million seller". Often referred to as "the nation's idol" due to the broad popular appeal of their hit songs, they are regarded as "legends of K-pop".

Due to their extended hiatus and lack of overseas promotions, their popularity and fame has been largely limited to the domestic market or within the Korean diaspora overseas. However, their songs remain some of the most recognized and well-known within South Korea and their hits such as "To Mother", "Road" and "One Candle" are considered classic Korean language songs.

== History ==
=== Beginnings ===
In 1997, Park Joon-hyung flew to South Korea with the goal of creating a group which blended Western and Asian influences. He recruited his cousin Danny Ahn and the latter's friend Son Ho-young; Yoon Kye-sang and Kim Tae-woo were later recruited through auditions. Their formation was fraught with difficulties from the beginning as their talent management company EBM (which merged into Sidus and again split to become iHQ (SidusHQ) in 2005) had been affected the 1997 Asian financial crisis and was forced to cut financial funding for its trainees. After over a year, executives allowed them to continue with the project due to their persistence and introduced singer-songwriter and JYP Entertainment founder Park Jin-young to be their producer and mentor. Kim Sun-a had been briefly part of the project group before leaving to pursue acting and Kim Tae-woo, who was still a high school student, was the final member added, joining the group in July 1998. The group was to be called "Got6", but their name was changed to g.o.d (Groove Over Dose) instead when it became a five-member boy band; Park Jin-young has since revealed that Got7's group name originated from Got6.

=== 1999: Debut ===
The group made their debut appearance on January 13, 1999, performing "To Mother" (어머님께), the title track of their first album, live on the SBS late night show One Night of TV Entertainment (ko). The music video for the song featured actor Jang Hyuk. Although it has since become one of their most famous songs, the initial televised performance did not earn a positive response from those in the music industry. g.o.d also gained attention for their "boys next door" persona and vocal talent, a stark contrast to the trend of the era which was largely focused on groups with visually appealing members and highly sophisticated and energetic choreography. They released their second album at the end of the year and it garnered a much better response and also earned the group their first ever #1 win on a music program.

=== 2000–2006: Mainstream success, Kye-sang's departure, and hiatus ===
In January 2000, the five members appeared in a reality TV series, called g.o.d's Baby Diaries (ko), which aired as a segment of MBC's "Achieve the Goal Saturday" (ko) weekend program. The members acted as a family to take care of an eleventh-month old boy named Han Jae-min. Every one of them had a duty (i.e. Son Ho Young acted as 'mommy' and Park Joon Hyung as 'daddy'). The show was popular due to the fact that it was the first time an idol group had starred in their own reality show and its high ratings reportedly forced the sketch comedy show Gag Concert, which aired at the same time on MBC's competitor broadcaster KBS, to switch time slots.

Just a year after debuting, g.o.d saw success with the release of their third album, which sold over a million copies. Its promoted track "Lies" (거짓말) dominated the #1 spot on music programs and also won the Daesang ("Grand Prize") at the KBS Music Awards. Following the success of their third album, g.o.d held their first national tour beginning in February 2001 and became only the second K-pop group (after H.O.T.) to hold a concert in the largest sports venue in South Korea, the Seoul Olympic Stadium. In November that year, g.o.d launched their fourth album Chapter 4, their second album to hit a million in sales. The title track "Road" (길) topped the rankings on several music shows and has since become a classic hit. The album won the Disk Daesang (Grand Prize) at the 16th Golden Disc Awards. Additionally, the group achieved a rare feat by sweeping the Daesang awards at the respective year-end music awards run by the country's three major broadcasting stations KBS, SBS and MBC.

The group nearly broke up in September 2001 after Park was discovered to be dating, which was considered to be taboo for most pop stars in South Korea at that time. Their management announced, without informing him or the other group members, that he was to leave the group and g.o.d would continue as a quartet. It was met with strong objection from fans, who repeatedly signed petitions, threatened to boycott concerts and stated their intentions of returning purchased merchandise for refunds. Ahn, Yoon, Son and Kim held their own press conference, without the knowledge of their management, to show their support for Park. By November, their management eventually backed down.

Having established themselves as the country's best selling idol group of 2001, g.o.d was invited to perform at the inaugural MTV Asia Awards held in Singapore as the Korean representative and was nominated for the Favorite Artist Award (Korea). While in Singapore, the group was interviewed by Time magazine and featured on the cover of the Asian edition for July 29. However, the article they were featured in was met with criticism by Korean music critics, local media and g.o.d's management agency SidusHQ as the author used a misquote attributed to Yoon Kye-sang to segue into an opinion editorial about corruption within the K-pop industry rather than focus on g.o.d as one of the country's most popular pop groups. They were chosen as the country's representative artistes to be featured in the 2002 FIFA World Cup official album Fever Pitch, for which they recorded the song "True East Side". In July they took a break from television promotions and began their "100-day Human Concert" series where all the shows were sold out and each day had a different theme.

Yoon left the group in 2004 and g.o.d switched to JYP Entertainment after their group contract with SidusHQ expired. They continued promoting as a quartet, releasing another two more albums. They went on hiatus from 2006 after holding their last concert in December 2005. Various media outlets and sources have described them as having disbanded between 2006 and 2014. However, the remaining members stated that they chose not use the term "disbanding" as they had promised fans they would reunite as a five-piece at some point in the future. All members remained in the entertainment industry: Park returned to the United States to pursue acting, Ahn hosted KBS Cool FM's Kiss the Radio while Son and Kim continued as singers and musical actors. The remaining four members unofficially reunited to perform in 2012 at the Korean Music Festival in Los Angeles and on SBS MTV's The Stage Big Pleasure.

=== 2014: 15th anniversary reunion ===
Beginning in 2013 there was already speculation that the members of g.o.d were discussing the possibility of reuniting. Following Yoon Kye-sang's confirmation to rejoin the group and lengthy discussion and organization with the members' individual managements, they recommenced group activities under their original management agency SidusHQ. On May 3, 2014 their 15th anniversary concert was announced through a TV advertisement which aired on Korean cable channel jTBC, followed by confirmation from their management agency. Despite the low-key announcement and the group's refusal to promote on music programs, their comeback received extensive media coverage and became a trending topic on the internet within South Korea as they were the first inactive K-pop idol group to make a comeback with all of its original members.

The album Chapter 8 was released on July 8, 2014. Several songs were pre-released as teasers for their official comeback tour. The pre-released singles, "The Lone Duckling" (also "The Ugly Duckling") (미운 오리 새끼) and "Sky Blue Promise" (하늘색 약속), both achieved "all kills" in the digital charts. The music videos for "Saturday Night", which contained references of their hit "Friday Night", and the ballad "Story of Our Lives" were uploaded on YouTube. The album was repackaged and released in October as the "Thank You" edition and included a new song "Wind" (바람), whose lyrics were written by Yoon to express his gratitude to fans.

The group began their 15th anniversary tour on July 12, 2014 at Jamsil Sports Complex with around 14,000 fans in attendance. It was their first concert as a quintet in 12 years. Initially they had planned to hold two concerts over two days in Seoul but extended it to eight more dates in four other cities due to popular demand. They also made their first televised performance together in 12 years on September 5 as exclusive guests on You Hee-yeol's Sketchbook, the only guests who have been granted the honor. They concluded their national tour with an encore concert in October at the 40,000-capacity Seoul Olympic Stadium, the second time they have held a sold-out concert at the venue. In November they extended their tour overseas for the time, holding concerts at the Staples Center in Los Angeles, California and Prudential Center in Newark, New Jersey, and became the first single South Korean group to play at stadiums in the United States since BIGBANG (Alive Galaxy Tour).

=== 2015–present: post-reunion activities ===
The group made a rare live televised performance as a quintet, performing at the "I Am Korea" Gala Concert celebrating 70 years of independence which was broadcast live on KBS1. On December 9, 2015, they released the maxi single "A Funny but Sad Day" (웃픈 하루) and the music video was uploaded by CJ E&M in anticipation of their upcoming year-end concerts. Although the group did not promote the song at all, it was the top 30 most downloaded singles that month and remained in the Gaon Digital Chart for six consecutive weeks. They held a series of sold-out concerts in Seoul over five days before heading to Daegu and Busan to celebrate the Christmas holidays and New Year's Day with fans. They took a break in 2016 while the members returned to their solo activities.

For the first two months of 2017 g.o.d embarked on their second nationwide tour since reuniting. Entitled g.o.d to MEN the tour began in Seoul and went to five other major cities. The Incheon concert on January 13 was extended by several hours as it coincided with the 18th anniversary of their debut and culminated in a special fan event hosted by DinDin.

On September 19, 2018, jTBC released a trailer of Shall We Walk Together (같이걸을까), a 10-episode travel variety-reality show which documented the members' trip to walk the Camino de Santiago in Spain. It began airing on October 11, as part of a series of projects to celebrate the 20th anniversary of their debut. On November 27, they released the single "Snowfall" (눈이 내린다) to little fanfare and it debuted at #63 on the Gaon Digital Chart that week with over 9 million downloads and streams despite intense competition from their much younger counterparts. From November 30 to December 2 they held a series of concerts entitled "Greatest" at the KSPO Dome before playing in Busan and Daegu on December 22 and 25 respectively. In a positive review, the Kukmin Ilbo noted that the concerts were appropriately named as g.o.d was one of the few K-pop groups who could put together a full concert set list exclusively consisting of songs that won number 1 on music programs. On January 10, 2019, the album Then & Now was released. It contains a mixture of new original material, including a title track composed by Park Jin-young, as well as remixed and re-recorded songs from previous albums. On January 13, they held the last of their anniversary concerts, playing to a sold-out crowd at the KSPO Dome.

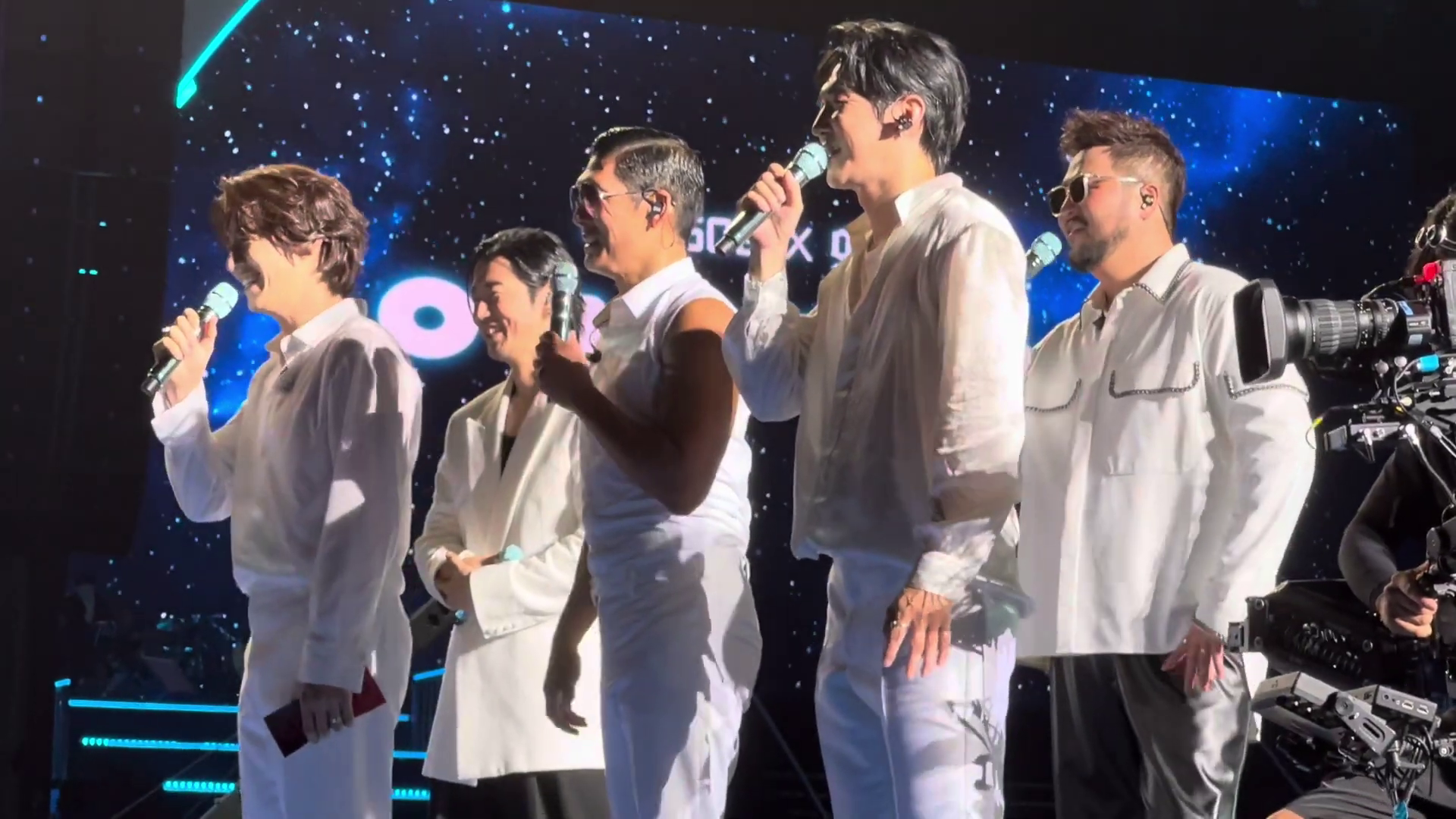
g.o.d in 2023 Left to right: Son Ho-young, Yoon Kye-sang, Joon Park, Danny Ahn, Kim Tae-woo

On September 30, 2022, after COVID-19 restrictions on large-scale performances and events were lifted, it was announced g.o.d would be holding their year-end concerts at the KSPO Dome from December 9–11. Due to popular demand, December 24 and 25 were added and would take place in Busan.

In anticipation of their upcoming 25th anniversary, g.o.d planned a series of projects beginning in late 2023. KBS honored them as the featured legend for its annual KBS Grand Project (KBS 대기획), the station's flagship televised Chuseok special. The sold-out special concert took place outdoors in Songdo Moonlight Festival Park and was aired on September 28. In November, they began their "g.o.d's Masterpiece" tour with three consecutive nights in Seoul, followed by December dates in Daegu and Busan. A concert film of the tour was produced and screened in cinemas nationwide on January 10, 2024.

g.o.d made a well-received appearance at KCON Los Angeles in July 2024, the first time they performed at an overseas K-pop festival as a quintet. Due to the rarity of a first-generation K-pop group appearing at KCON, the surprise announcement of their participation drew much media attention in South Korea and among the Korean diaspora in the United States. Their 25th anniversary concerts, entitled "Chapter 0", took place at the KSPO Dome in September 27–29. The members made a rare appearance together on television through Park and Kim's managers featuring in the reality show Omniscient Interfering View. Footage of the rehearsals and some of the performances from the September 29 concert were shown on the program.

== Artistry ==
=== Musical style and themes ===
Although known primarily for R&B, g.o.d has often displayed their versatility as their albums feature songs which combine elements of different genres such as hip hop, rap, funk and dance pop: their debut single "To Mother" (어머님께) contains elements of hip hop and a refrain sung in R&B style, the upbeat and rhythmic "Friday Night" from the second album heavily features funk elements and the ballad "The Story of Our Lives" from the most recent album utilizes a "duet" of the rap and singing parts in the chorus to create a polyphonic texture. Park Joon-hyung has stated that from the beginning he had intended for the group to effectively combine Western and Asian influences into their music. They were one of the few first generation K-pop groups to successfully incorporate elements of African American genres such as rap and hip hop into their music and utilize lines rapped almost entirely in Korean. While each song differs in genre, a key characteristic is a prominently distinct and simple melody which is accompanied by a minimalistic piano, guitar or percussion-based groove. Their overall style has been described as a mixture of "belting styles" with "gentle rap, candid lyrics and plain vocal narration". Their ability to seamlessly transition between rap and R&B is apparent in their hit songs, most of which are classified as R&B ballads or pop but contain at least several lines that are rapped. This combination of a prominent lyrical melody and rap has been described as their "signature". Some songs feature a spoken narration to introduce the song. They have shied away from trending genres such as bubblegum pop and electronic music and refrained from following the more prevalent practice of incorporating multiple English words and phrases into the lyrics.

In contrast to their contemporaries such as Shinhwa, H.O.T. and Sechs Kies whose repertoire was largely either "feel-good" or hard rock or was choreography-based, g.o.d was focused on lyrical content, garnering them a wider demographic of fans. The trademark features of their repertoire are the "story telling" style and subject matter of their lyrics, which are typically written as narratives told from a first-person perspective instead of utilizing repetitive and simplistic catchy hooks. MTV Asia describes their songs as "[leaning] towards the social commentary side, with heartfelt lyrics that make people cry until today." Their songs often reflected relatable themes such as love, loss and family or were based on their personal experiences: their debut single "To Mother" was partly based on leader Park Joon-hyung's childhood while "The Story of Five Men" (다섯 남자 이야기) described their frugal living conditions during their first year as struggling young singers. Other songs are more humorous and parodied the members themselves, such as the self-composed "Sky Blue Balloon" (하늘색 풍선), in which rapper Danny Ahn refers to himself by his nickname Skinny Pig.

Critics and media have noted the group's unique blend of five distinctly different voices. Mnet's Legends 100 series noted that "[The] synergy created by these five people began a page of popular music history that has never been seen before."

=== Image ===
Along with Shinhwa, g.o.d was the earliest idol group to adopt a more public-friendly approach towards fans, transitioning away from the mysterious and intensely private personas of earlier groups H.O.T. and Sechs Kies. As a vocally-focused group, g.o.d did not adopt any image or concept aimed at a particular age demographic unlike most idol groups at that time which were pitched as teen idols and it further added to their "everyman" persona and solidified their nickname "the nation's group". Likewise, they have refrained from colorful and elaborate stage costumes or complex choreography, preferring to utilize themes and simple dance routines to allow members to directly engage with the audience.

=== Stage ===
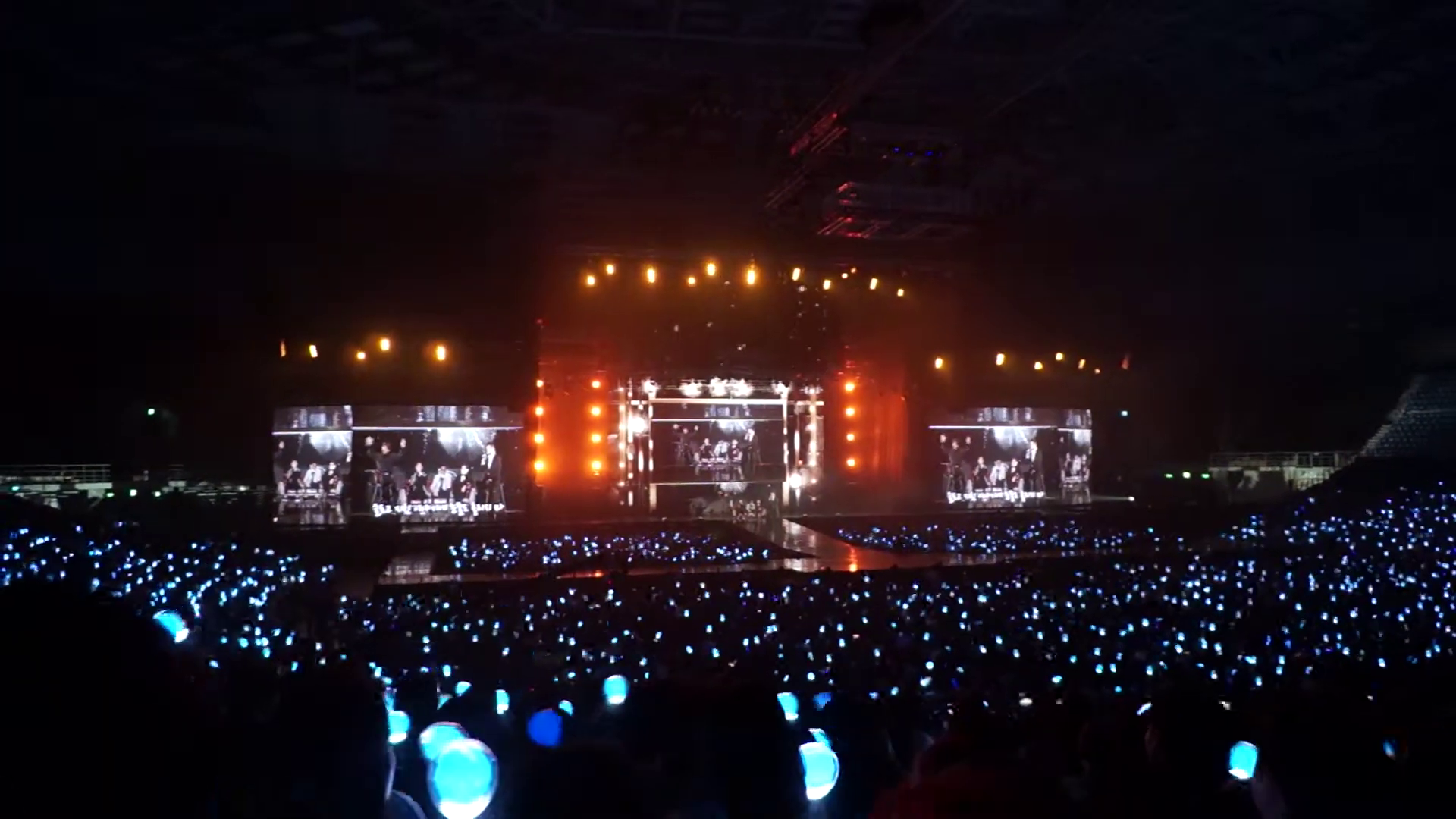
g.o.d performing during their "Greatest" concert in 2018

g.o.d is the first K-pop idol group to hold one hundred concerts, a feat they achieved during the "100-day Human Concert" series in 2002 and 2003. They gained popularity and acclaim as consummate entertainers for their stage presence and humorously casual style, often presiding over their concerts themselves. The group is noted within the industry for their interactive approach towards fans during concerts, which often feature segments such as taking song requests or teaching the audience a dance move. Critics have described their concerts as "a giant noraebang" due to the group's large number of recognizable hit songs. After their 2014 reunion, g.o.d have held concerts every year with the exception of 2016 (solo activities) and 2020 and 2021 (COVID-19 pandemic) and became more experimental and innovative, revising their choreography and the instrumentation of their background tracks of all their hit songs several times. They have been dubbed domestic "box office powerhouses" for being able to consistently sell out large-scale venues over multiple nights despite not aggressively promoting their concerts on television or social media, with ticket sales figures comparable to much younger and globally-known idol groups. In 2025 they sold out the Olympic Gymnastics Arena (KSPO Dome) for a fourth consecutive year.

Since their early days, g.o.d's concerts have revolved around specific themes. Their first national tour was entitled "The Story of Five Men", a reference to the eponymous song from their second album chronicling the austere conditions they endured while preparing to debut. The "100-day Human Concert" series notably featured a different theme for each concert. The "g.o.d to MEN" national tour in early 2017 was designed and choreographed as a Broadway musical while their 25th anniversary concerts "Chapter 0" referenced the titles of their studio albums and utilized a 360-degree stage in the middle of the arena that was designed in the shape of the three letters of the group name.

== Legacy ==
g.o.d is a group that is remembered as a "song" unlike any of the idol groups in Korea. Many idol groups that have appeared in the past twenty years since H.O.T and S.E.S. in the mid-90s are remembered for brilliant dances, fashion, superb concepts, sexiness, and cuteness. But g.o.d was different. Songs such as "One Candle", "To Mother", "Love and Remember", "Lies", and "An Ordinary Day" were loved by various generations... [...] g.o.d tried to differentiate themselves with a unique minimalist, warm sound. — 10Asia

g.o.d was the first K-pop group to be dubbed "the nation's group" (Korean: 국민그룹; RR: Gukmin geurup), a sobriquet popularized by the media and cultural commentators due to their appeal to not only the teenage demographic, but across a much broader age demographic compared to their contemporaries. In contrast to their contemporaries, who were primarily targeting a teenage audience, they were known as the boy band which "appealed to both teenagers and their parents" and "rose beyond its status as an idol group to be loved by people of all ages." Cultural commentators have noted that the subject matter of their debut song "To Mother" and other songs such as "One Candle" and "Road" further contributed to their broad popular appeal as the country was transitioning out of difficult times and was still recovering from the 1997 Asian financial crisis when the group debuted. They are the first idol group to star in their own reality show, g.o.d's Baby Diaries, beginning a trend of idol singers and other entertainers participating in similar shows such as Hello Baby and The Return of Superman.

g.o.d set a number of records in sales figures. They currently hold the record for the highest-selling album (not including a repackaged version) within a single month – their fourth album Chapter 4 (released in November 2001) sold 1,441,209 copies within a month of its release – and was the only K-pop group to have the sales figures of an album surpass the 1.2 million mark within that time frame until BTS accomplished the same feat in 2017 with the album Love Yourself: Her. They are the most recent K-pop group to sell over a million physical copies of a full album and the last group to do so prior to the establishment of digital music stores, having sold over 1.7 million copies of Chapter 4, before EXO reached the milestone in 2013.

The enduring popularity and cross-generational appeal of their songs have been noted by second and third generation K-pop idols, many of whom stating that they had grown up listening to g.o.d's music as elementary school students. Of the inactive or disbanded first-generation groups, g.o.d was the first to make a comeback and still attain success in a highly saturated market in spite of a nearly decade-long hiatus, which commentators attributed to their discography and an ongoing domestic retro wave spurred by younger consumers' interest in the pop culture of the 1980s and 1990s. After reuniting in 2014, they have continued with group activities while maintaining their individual solo careers and have been cited by younger generations of artists as industry "role models" and "inspirations".

Widely acknowledged within the Korean music industry as "legends of K-pop", g.o.d is the only guest to perform on You Hee-yeol's Sketchbook as exclusive guests and the first K-pop group to be the featured legend on Immortal Songs: Singing the Legend and chosen for KBS's annual Chuseok special Grand Project. In 2013 the group was selected and featured in Legend 100 – Artists, a Mnet documentary series highlighting 100 legendary Korean artists (both solo artists and groups) active from 1933 to 2002 selected by a panel of fifty professors, music critics and other music professionals for their contributions and achievements. According to a 2016 poll conducted by The Dong-a Ilbo in which thirty music industry experts and nearly 2,000 citizens voted for the top 15 greatest male K-pop idol groups of the past twenty years, g.o.d was ranked third by the public and fifth by the panel of experts. In 2021, Melon and Seoul Shinmun placed two of g.o.d's best-known songs, "Lies" and "Road", on their list of the Top 100 K-pop Masterpieces as determined by thirty-five music critics and industry experts.

In contrast to the industry norm for group and all members' individual contracts to be managed by a single company, g.o.d's contractual arrangement was considered groundbreaking for its time as the contracts of the group and each individual member were managed by two different companies. They were managed by and the trademark of their group name is still owned by EBM (now SidusHQ), but individual contracts were managed separately: the individual contracts of the original four members (Park Joon-hyung, Yoon Kye-sang, Danny Ahn and Son Ho-young) were initially managed by SidusHQ while Kim Tae-woo was managed by Park Jin-young's label and agency JYP Entertainment. It would set a precedent in the K-pop industry as this arrangement allowed long-running group Shinhwa to continue group activities after leaving S.M. Entertainment and for g.o.d and fellow first-generation idol group Sechs Kies to recommence group activities after a number of years despite all members being managed by different companies and agencies.

=== In popular culture ===
At the time of its release, "To Mother" (어머님께) was the most requested track on radio stations. Other songs, such as "One Candle" (촛불하나), "Love and Remember" (사랑해 그리고 기억해), "Lies" (거짓말) and "Road" (길) are considered "indisputable K-pop classics recognized and enjoyed by Koreans of all ages" and regularly covered on singing competitions and music variety shows. "Sorrow" (애수), from the second album, was featured in the Pump It Up video game series. Their songs have been used as background music on various television dramas and variety shows, including tvN's Reply 1994, KBS's Drama Special and The Return of Superman and many others.

== Members ==
- Park Joon-hyung (박준형) – rap, dance, leader
- Yoon Kye-sang (윤계상) – vocals
- Danny Ahn (데니 안) – rap
- Son Ho-young (손호영) – vocals
- Kim Tae-woo (김태우) – vocals

== Discography ==
- Chapter 1 (1999)
- Chapter 2 (1999)
- Chapter 3 (2000)
- Chapter 4 (2001)
- Chapter 5: Letter (2002)
- An Ordinary Day (2004)
- Into the Sky (2005)
- Chapter 8 (2014)
- Then & Now (2019)

== Tours and concerts ==
Concert tours

- 1st National Tour: The Story of Five Men (2001)
- SK Telecom Ting Concert (2003)
- g.o.d is Back (2005)
- 15th Anniversary Reunion Tour (2014)
- g.o.d 2015 Concert (2015)
- g.o.d to Men Tour (2017)
- g.o.d 20th Anniversary Tour "Greatest" (2018–2019)
- g.o.d "On" Concert Tour (2022)
- g.o.d's Masterpiece Tour (2023)
- g.o.d "Chapter 0" Concert (2024)
- g.o.d "Iconic Box" Tour (2025)

Residencies

- 100 Days Human Concert (2002–2003)

== See also ==
- List of South Korean idol groups (1990s)
- List of best-selling albums in South Korea

Awards and achievements
Preceded by Jo Sung-mo	Golden Disk Awards (Daesang); 2001	Succeeded by COOL
