= Kim Tae-woo (singer) =

South Korean musician

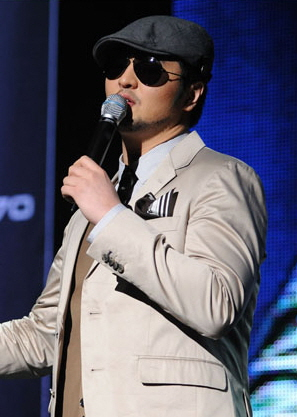
- Kim at Samsung LiveSets concert, on March 25, 2011
- Born: May 12, 1981 (age 45); Gumi, North Gyeongsang, South Korea
- Education: Kyung Hee University
- Occupations: Singer; music producer
- Spouse: Kim Ae-ri (m. 2011)
- Children: 3
- Musical career
- Genres: K-pop; R&B; Electropop
- Years active: 1999–present
- Label: IOK Company
- Member of: g.o.d

- Korean name
- Hangul: 김태우
- RR: Gim Taeu
- MR: Kim T'aeu

Kim Tae-woo (Korean: 김태우; born May 12, 1981) is a South Korean singer, best known as the lead vocalist of boy band g.o.d. He debuted in 1999 as a member of g.o.d and continued as a solo artist after the group went on hiatus in 2005. In addition to his solo career, Kim has also sung the OSTs of award-winning popular dramas and performed in musicals.

== Background ==
Kim was born in Gumi, North Gyeongsang Province, the only son and youngest of three children. Despite not having a musical background, Kim dreamed of becoming a singer as a teenager, especially after watching HOT, and sent in a demo tape to Park Jin-young, who was recruiting a final member for the project group that would become g.o.d. He bought a one-way ticket to Seoul after being called in for an audition and eventually signed with Park's company JYP Entertainment. He studied Postmodern Music at Kyung Hee University.

== Career ==
=== 1998–2005: Early years and g.o.d ===
From 1997 to 1998, Park Joon-hyung and Park Jin-young had been holding auditions and putting together a six-member mixed group. Danny Ahn, Son Ho-young, Yoon Kye-sang and Kim Sun-a had already been recruited for the project group, which was planned to be called "GOT6" but Kim Sun-a eventually left to pursue acting. In July 1998, he was the youngest and final member added after passing his audition. Kim's bandmates later stated that they had resented Kim up until their debut due to the change in line-up and Kim's relatively short training period compared to them. Eventually the group became g.o.d, an acronym for "Groove Over Dose". Despite a lukewarm response to their debut performance in January 1999, g.o.d went on to establish themselves as one of the most popular first-generation K-pop groups. Yoon left the group in 2004 and g.o.d continued as a four-man group before going on hiatus in late December 2005.

=== 2006–2014: Solo career ===
With g.o.d having gone on hiatus, Kim and the remaining members at JYP Entertainment left for other agencies. Although he did guest vocals for other artists, Kim did not release his own solo album until October 26, 2006. He enlisted in the army on March 20, 2007 for mandatory military service and was discharged on February 25, 2009.

After his discharge, Kim returned to the entertainment industry, joining the KBS Variety Show, Invincible Youth as a permanent cast member. He left after the first season to undergo throat surgery.

Kim released his second album T-Virus on September 3, 2009. The album featured the lead single "Love Rain" (Korean: 사랑비; RR: Sarang bi), which has since become one of Kim's most well-known songs and remains a popular noraebang song based on figures compiled by the Gaon Music Chart. The song has also won first place on various music programs. He won the Best Ballad/R&B Performance Award at the 11th Mnet Asian Music Awards.

In February 2010, Kim and toured overseas together for the first time with his g.o.d bandmate and close friend Son Ho-young. They held six concerts in Chicago, Seattle and Vancouver. Kim was one of three former JYP Entertainment artists, the others being Son and their close friend Rain, invited to perform at the first JYP Nation concert TEAMPLAY held at the Olympic Gymnastics Arena that December.

In March 2011, Kim terminated his contract with Polaris Entertainment and established his own one-man agency, Soul Shop Entertainment. Shortly after, he released his third album T-School, which peaked at No. 3 on the Gaon Album Chart. The song "Echo" (메아리) earned him a second nomination at the Mnet Asian Music Awards. The album also featured "Brothers & Me", composed by Park Jin-young and featured Park and fellow former JYP Entertainment artist Rain.

Kim maintained contact with his bandmates, often performing or appearing on variety shows with Son. They also performed together with Danny Ahn during the "Legends" stage of the Music Bank special celebrating 600 episodes and at the 2012 Korean Music Festival. Son and Ahn have both featured in Kim's albums as guest artists.

=== 2014–present: g.o.d reunion and other solo activities ===
After lengthy discussions and organization, it was announced that all five members of g.o.d would reunite for their 15th anniversary and release a new album. Chapter 8 was released on July 8, 2014 and was co-produced by Kim and renowned songwriting duo Duble Sidekick. They will concentrate mainly on releasing new material and holding live concerts rather than promoting or performing on music programs as a group.

In 2015 Kim made his first comeback as a solo artist since g.o.d's reunion with his fifth album T-Road. Released on June 18, the album contained two lead singles, one of which was "Lonely Funk", which featured hip hop artist and former 2PM member Jay Park. Kim's bandmate Danny Ahn starred in the accompanying music video. Ahn also co-wrote with Kim and featured in the song "Hometown" (뽀레버막내) (also "Forever the Youngest"), which was a humorous tribute to his g.o.d bandmates and recounted his experiences of being the youngest member of the group.

Following a successful national tour in January and February 2017, the group went on a break. Kim released in sixth album, entitled T-WITH, in June 2017. The title alludes to the fact that all the tracks, except for one, features guest singers. The album includes two singles which had been pre-released in June and July 2016 respectively as T-With Vol.1 and T-WITH Vol.2. He was invited to KCON Los Angeles for the first time and performed g.o.d's 2000 hit song "One Candle" with rookie boy band ASTRO before performing "Following" (따라가), the lead single of his latest album. In December he held a series of joint concerts with bandmate Son Ho-young, the first time they have ever held a concert together domestically, over three days in Seoul and Busan.

In May 2018 Kim replaced Hwang Chi-yeul as a waiting room MC on the popular singing program Immortal Songs: Singing the Legend; he had previously been a guest MC during Moon Hee-joon's temporary absence. He was one of fifteen artists or groups, including the likes of Insooni, 2PM and DJ Doc, headlining the medal ceremony aftershow for each day of the 2018 Winter Olympics in Pyeongchang County. During the latter half of the year, Kim was mostly focused on g.o.d's 20th anniversary projects. He produced their anniversary album Then & Now and co-wrote its lead single "Snowfall", which was pre-released as a digital single.

On August 1, 2019, via Instagram, Kim and Son announced that they were collaborating as a project duo under the name HoooW (Korean: 호우; RR: Ho-u), a portmanteau combining one character from each of their given names. As HoooW, they have appeared on Immortal Songs: Singing the Legend and You Hee-yeol's Sketchbook and performed as guests at Psy's summer concerts. On August 16, they released the digital single "Game Over" (Korean: 친구는 이제 끝내기로 해; RR: Chinguneun ije kkeutnaegiro hae).

In 2022, Kim signed with IOK Company.

== Personal life ==
Kim Tae Woo married his wife Kim Aeri, who is a year younger than him, at the Sheraton Hotel in Seoul in December 2011. They are parents to daughters So-yool (born April 2012) and Ji-yool (born August 2013) and son Hae-yool (born September 2015). In 2014, Kim, his wife, and his two daughters were regulars on the SBS reality show Oh! My Baby.

== Filmography ==
=== Television show ===
Year	Title	Role	Notes	Ref.
2009–2010	Invincible Youth Season 1	Host		
2021	Sing Together Season 2	Host	with KCM	

=== Web show ===
Year	Title	Role	Ref.
2021	Osinger's Game	Host	

== Awards and nominations ==
=== Mnet Asian Music Awards ===
Year	Category	Work	Result
2009	Best Ballad/R&B Performance	"Love Rain" (사랑비)	Won
2011	Best Male Artist	"Echo" (메아리)	Nominated
