= S.E.S. discography =

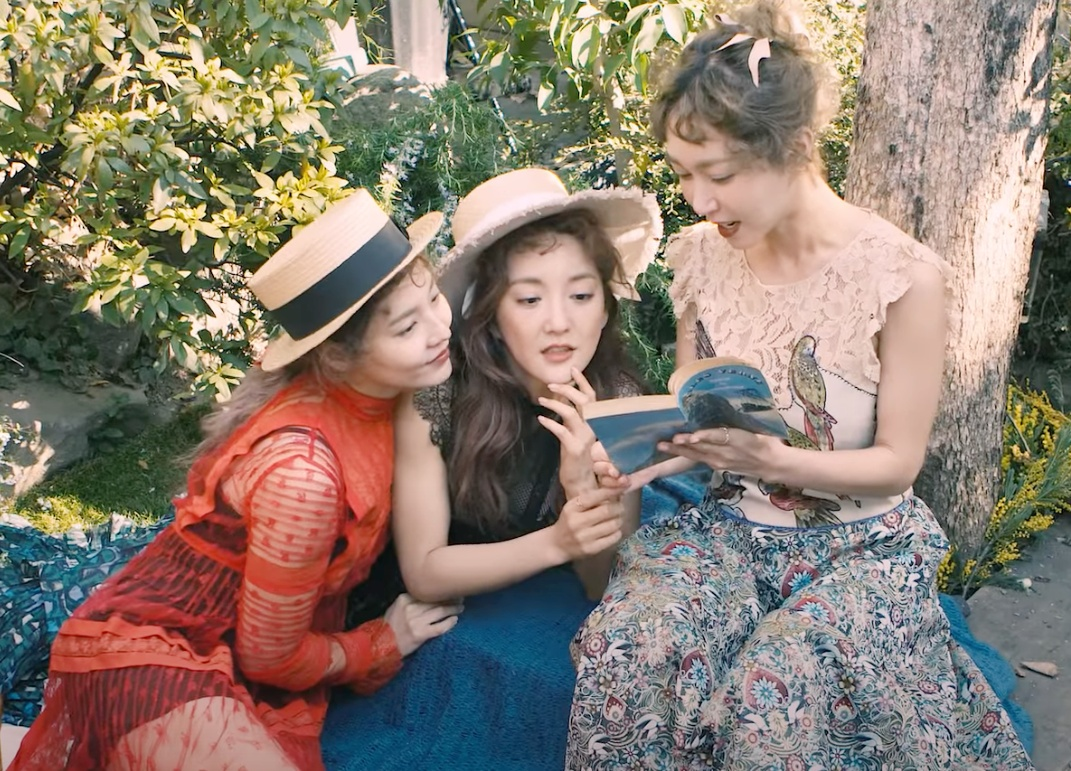
- S.E.S. in 2017
- Studio albums: 8
- Compilation albums: 6
- Video albums: 3
- Remix albums: 1

The discography of South Korean girl group S.E.S. consists of eight studio albums, six compilation albums, three video albums, and one remix album. The group debuted in 1997 under SM Entertainment and disbanded in 2002. The group made a reunion in 2016 with their sixth Korean studio album.

== Albums ==
=== Studio albums ===
Title	Album details	Peak chart positions			Sales
Title	Album details	KOR RIAK (Note: The Recording Industry Association of Korea chart was published from mid-1998 through mid-2008.)	KOR Gaon (Note: The Gaon Music Chart was established in 2010.)	JPN	Sales
Korean
I'm Your Girl	Released: November 1, 1997; Label: SM Entertainment; Format: CD, cassette, digital download	—	—	—	KOR: 650,000
Sea & Eugene & Shoo	Released: November 27, 1998; Label: SM Entertainment; Format: CD, cassette, digital download	1	—	—	KOR: 651,330
Love	Released: October 29, 1999; Label: SM Entertainment; Format: CD, cassette, digital download	1	—	—	KOR: 760,475
A Letter from Greenland	Released: December 22, 2000; Label: SM Entertainment; Format: CD, cassette, digital download	1	—	—	KOR: 635,713
Choose My Life-U	Released: February 14, 2002; Label: SM Entertainment; Format: CD, cassette, digital download	1	—	—	KOR: 406,528
Remember	Released: January 2, 2017; Label: SM Entertainment; Format: CD, digital download	—	7	—	KOR: 6,373
Japanese
Reach Out	Released: March 10, 1999; Label: VAP; Format: CD	—	—	50	JPN: 10,290
Be Ever Wonderful	Released: May 24, 2000; Label: VAP; Format: CD	—	—	93	JPN: 2,760
"—" denotes releases that did not chart or were not released in that region.

=== Compilation albums ===
Title	Album details	Peak chart positions		Sales
Title	Album details	KOR RIAK	JPN	Sales
Korean
Surprise	Released: July 11, 2001; Label: SM Entertainment; Formats: CD, cassette, digital download	3	—	KOR: 357,986
Friend	Released: November 21, 2002; Label: SM Entertainment; Formats: CD, cassette, digital download	1	—	KOR: 94,654
Japanese
Prime: S.E.S. the Best	Released: March 15, 2000; Label: VAP; Format: CD	—	64	JPN: 3,750
Here & There – S.E.S. Singles Collection	Released: March 16, 2001; Label: VAP; Format: CD	—	—	
S.E.S. Best	Released: July 7, 2002; Label: VAP; Format: CD	—	—	
Beautiful Songs	Released: June 25, 2003; Label: Avex Trax; Format: CD	—	—	
"—" denotes releases that did not chart or were not released in that region.

=== Video albums ===
Title	Album details
Dreams Come True	Released: September 17, 1999; Label: SM Entertainment; Format: CD, VCD
2000 S.E.S. First Concert	Released: June 16, 2000; Label: SM Entertainment; Format: CD, VCD, VHS
S.E.S Video Clips	Released: August 8, 2000; Label: SM Entertainment; Format: VCD, VHS

=== Remix albums ===
Title	Album details
S.E.S. Remixed – Dal Ri Gi/Just a Feeling	Released: August 29, 2002; Label: SM Entertainment; Format: CD, cassette, digital download

== Singles ==
Title	Year	Peak chart positions		Sales	Album
Title	Year	KOR	JPN	Sales	Album
Korean
"('Cause) I'm Your Girl"	1997	25	—		I'm Your Girl
"Oh, My Love"	1997	—	—		I'm Your Girl
"Dreams Come True"	1998	—	—		Sea & Eugene & Shoo
"I Love You" (너를 사랑해)	1998	36	—		Sea & Eugene & Shoo
"Shy Boy"	1998	—	—		Sea & Eugene & Shoo
"Love"	1999	—	—		Love
"Twilight Zone"	1999	—	—		Love
"Show Me Your Love" (감싸 안으며)	2000	—	—		A Letter from Greenland
"Be Natural"	2000	—	—		A Letter from Greenland
"Just in Love" (꿈을 모아서) (Korean version)	2001	—	—		Surprise
"U"	2002	—	—		Choose My Life-U
"Just a Feeling" (Remix version)	2002	—	—		Choose My Life-U
"S.II.S (Soul To Soul)"	2002	—	—		Friend
"Love [story]"	2016	22	—	KOR: 63,930	Remember
"Remember"	2017	48	—	KOR: 38,561	Remember
"Paradise" (한 폭의 그림)	2017	—	—	KOR: 15,854	Remember
Japanese
"Meguriau Sekai" (めぐりあう世界)	1998	—	37	JPN: 13,780	Reach Out
"I'm Your Girl (Kreva Mix)"	1998	—	82	JPN: 3,090	Non-album single
"Yume wo Kasanete" (夢をかさねて)	1999	—	83	JPN: 2,470	Reach Out
"Ai to Iu Na no Hokori" ((愛)という名の誇り)	1999	—	60	JPN: 8,930	Non-album single
"T.O.P. (Twinkling of Paradise)"	1999	—	56	JPN: 4,840	Prime: S.E.S. the Best
"Sign of Love" / "Miracle"	1999	—	78	JPN: 3,280	Prime: S.E.S. the Best
"Love ~Itsumademo Onje Kajima~" (Love ~いつまでもオンジェ·カジナ~)	2000	—	100	JPN: 2,030	Be Ever Wonderful
"Umi no Aurora" (海のオーロラ)	2000	—	—		Be Ever Wonderful
"Lovin' You"	2000	—	—		Here & There – S.E.S. Singles Collection
"—" denotes releases that did not chart or were not released in that region.
