= G.o.d discography =

g.o.d discography
- Studio albums: 8
- Compilation albums: 1
- Music videos: 22
- Single albums: 1

The discography of South Korean pop music group g.o.d includes eight studio albums, a compilation album and a single album. Debuting in 1999, the quintet released five studio albums before the departure of a member. The remaining members released another two albums as a quartet before going on an extended hiatus. Their eighth album was released in July 2014 to mark their reunion as a quintet and the 15th anniversary of their debut.

== Albums ==
=== Studio albums ===
Title	Album details	Peak chart positions	Sales
Title	Album details	KOR (Note: The Recording Industry Association of Korea (RIAK) tracked physical album, EP, and singles sales and released a consolidated sales and ranking chart monthly from January 1999 to September 2008. It did not track digital sales. The Gaon Music Chart was established in 2010 and is compiled by the Korea Music Content Industry Association, the successor organization of the RIAK. From January 2018, the Gaon Music Chart no longer publicizes sales figures but utilizes an index which accumulates sales figures from both physical and digital sales.)	Sales
Chapter 1	Released: January 26, 1999 (KOR); Label: EBM, Synnara Records; Formats: CD, cassette	5	KOR: 160,000
Chapter 2	Released: November 25, 1999 (KOR); Label: EBM, Synnara Records; Formats: CD, cassette	4	KOR: 578,567
Chapter 3	Released: November 3, 2000 (KOR); Label: SidusHQ, Synnara Records; Formats: CD, cassette	1	KOR: 1,824,278
Chapter 4	Released: November 15, 2001 (KOR); Label: SidusHQ, Yejeon Media; Formats: CD, cassette	1	KOR: 1,738,082
Chapter 5: Letter	Released: December 27, 2002 (KOR); Label: SidusHQ, Yejeon Media; Formats: CD, cassette	4	KOR: 463,038
An Ordinary Day (보통날)	Released: December 9, 2004 (KOR); Label: JYP Entertainment, Seoul Records; Formats: CD, cassette, digital download	1	KOR: 213,187
Into the Sky (하늘속으로)	Released: October 28, 2005 (KOR); Label: JYP Entertainment, Seoul Records; Formats: CD, cassette, digital download	1	KOR: 109,757
Chapter 8	Released: July 8, 2014 (KOR); Label: SidusHQ, CJ E&M; Formats: CD, digital download	2	KOR: 43,449

=== Reissues ===
Title	Album details	Peak chart positions	Sales
Title	Album details	KOR	Sales
Thanks Edition: 바람 (Wind)	Released: October 22, 2014 (KOR); Label: SidusHQ, CJ E&M; Formats: CD, digital download	5	KOR: 10,000

=== Compilations ===
Title	Album details	Peak chart positions	Sales
Title	Album details	KOR	Sales
Then & Now	Released: January 10, 2019 (KOR); Label: SidusHQ, Kakao M; Formats: CD, digital download	4	KOR: 20,521

== Single albums ==
Title	Album details	Peak chart positions	Sales
Title	Album details	KOR	Sales
g.o.d Single Album	Released: December 9, 2015 (KOR); Label: SidusHQ, CJ E&M; Formats: CD, digital download; Track listing: 1. 웃픈 하루 "A Funny But Sad Day"; 2. 웃픈 하루 (instrumental); 3. 네가 할 일 "What You Should Do"; 4. 네가 할 일 (instrumental)	8	KOR: 7,831

== Singles ==
Title	Year	Peak chart positions		Sales	Album
Title	Year	KOR	KOR Hot	Sales	Album
"To Mother"	1999	—	—		Chapter 1
"Love and Remember"	1999	—	—		Chapter 2
"Sorrow"	1999	—	—		Chapter 2
"Friday Night"	1999	—	—		Chapter 2
"Lies"	2000	—	—		Chapter 3
"One Candle"	2000	80	—	KOR: 42,821	Chapter 3
"I Need You"	2000	—	—		Chapter 3
"Road"	2001	—	—		Chapter 4
"The Place Where You Should Be"	2001	—	—		Chapter 4
"Letter"	2002	—	—		Chapter 5: Letter
"An Ordinary Day"	2004	—	—		An Ordinary Day
"The Reason Why Opposites Attract"	2004	—	—		An Ordinary Day
"Two-Love"	2005	—	—		Into the Sky
"Into the Sky"	2005	—	—		Into the Sky
"The Lone Duckling" (미운오리새끼)	2014	1	1	KOR: 932,344	Chapter 8
"Sky Blue Promise" (하늘색 약속)	2014	2	—	KOR: 728,716	Chapter 8
"Snowfall" (눈이 내린다)	2018	63	—		Then & Now

== Other charted songs ==
Title	Year	Peak chart positions	Sales	Album
Title	Year	KOR	Sales	Album
"The Story of Our Lives" (우리가 사는 이야기)	2014	3	KOR: 372,189	Chapter 8
"Sing for Me" (노래 불러줘요) (ft. IU)	2014	9	KOR: 339,899	Chapter 8
"Saturday Night"	2014	13	KOR: 252,559	Chapter 8
"An Ordinary Day" (original ver.) (보통날)	2014	19	KOR: 163,459	Chapter 8
"Stand Up"	2014	23	KOR: 123,232	Chapter 8
"Smile"	2014	26	KOR: 111,672	Chapter 8
"I Like It" (난 좋아)	2014	27	KOR: 115,448	Chapter 8
"G'Swag" (신사의 품격)	2014	28	KOR: 96,964	Chapter 8
"5+4+1+5=15"	2014	32	KOR: 77,646	Chapter 8
"Wind" (바람)	2014	12	KOR: 235,445	Chapter 8 (Repackage)
"A Funny But Sad Day" (웃픈 하루)	2015	13	KOR: 200,358	g.o.d Single Album
"What You Should Do" (네가 할 일)	2015	55	KOR: 39,788	g.o.d Single Album
"Leave That Man" (그 남자를 떠나)	2019	41		Then & Now
"Road" (by IU, Henry, Jo Hyun-ah and Yang Da-il) (길)	2019	14		Then & Now
"Eye to Eye" (눈을 맞춰)	2019	119		Then & Now

== Contributed singles and tracks ==
Year	Track	Album	Ref
2000	"god Bless TJ" (Jang Hyuk feat. g.o.d)	TJ Project	
2002	"True East Side" (g.o.d feat. JYP)	The Official Album of the 2002 FIFA World Cup	
2002	"True East Side" (g.o.d feat. JYP)	Fever Pitch	
2002	"Let's Go" (간다)	Champion OST	
2003	Theme song	Olympus Guardian (ko) OST	
2005	샴푸의 요정 (Lee Seung-chul feat. Park Joon-hyung and Danny Ahn)	A Walk to Remember	
2005	축복합니다 (Lee Seung-chul feat. g.o.d, Shinhwa, Lee Hyori, Kim Bum-soo, Clazziquai, Ock Joo-hyun, Tim and Sung Si-kyung)	A Walk to Remember	
2020	"Confession" (지금 만나러 갈게)	Do You Like Brahms? OST Part 2	

== Video albums ==
#	Information	Track listing
1	god — 2001 Live Concert 다섯 남자 이야기 (The Story of Five Men): Released: August 30, 2001; Labels : Spectrum; Disc Format(s): VCD (2 disc)	Disc 1: 1. Opening; 2. 니가 필요해 "I Need You"; 3. 애수 "Sorrow"; 4. Ment; 5. 돌아와 줘 "Wait For Me"; 6. 왜 "Why"; 7. 모두 가져가 "Take It All"; 8. "Dance All Night"; 9. "Step By Step"; 10. Vtr - g.o.d video collection 11. 그대 날 떠난 후로 "After You Left Me"; 12. 관찰 "Observation"; 13. 난 사랑을 몰라 "I Don't Know Love"; 14. Taewoo's Special - Livin` La Vida Loca; 15. Kyesang's Special - We Will Rock You; 16. Vtr - Danny shaving his head 17. Danny's Special - 1) Vtr / Video Letter + 2)Hip-hop 속으로; Disc 2: 1. Joonhyung's Special - 1) Nothing`s Gonna Change My Love For You + 2) Tour De France + Baw Wit Da Ba; 2. Hoyoung's Special - 1) Because I Love You (Yoo Jae Ha) 2) Wild Wild West; 3. 니가 다시 돌아올 수 있도록 "So You Can Come Back to Me"; 4. Ment; 5. "Say g.o.d" 6. Ment; 7. 거짓말 "Lie"; 8. Ment; 9. 작은 남자들과 함께 "With a Little Man"; 10. 사랑해 그리고 기억해 "Love and Remember"; 11. 어머님께 "To Mother"; 12. "Friday Night"; 13. Closing Ment; 14. 촛불하나 "One Candle"; 15. 하늘색 풍선 "Sky Blue Balloon"; 16. Bonus Track - 하늘색 풍선 "Sky Blue Balloon" (MV footage of concert performance)
2	god — 15th Anniversary Reunion Concert Special: Released: December, 2014; Labels : SidusHQ, Play Company Corp.; Disc Format(s): DVD, CD (5 DVDs, 1 CD)	Disc 1 : god 15th Anniversary Reunion Concert—Part 1: 1. Intro; 2. 미운오리새끼 "The Ugly Duckling"; 3. 길 "Road"; 4. 0%; 5. 하늘색 약속 "Sky Blue Promise"; 6. "Friday Night"; 7. 관찰 "Observation"; 8. 애수 "Sorrow"; 9. 사랑해 그리고 기억해 "Love and Remember"; 10. 모르죠 "You Don't Know"; 11. 왜 "Why"; 12. 우리가 사는 이야기 "The Story of Our Lives"; 13. 다시 "Again"; Disc 2 : god 15th Anniversary Reunion Concert—Part 2: DISC 2-1 : god 15th Anniversary Reunion Concert—Part 2; 1. 어머님께 "To Mother"; 2. 거짓말 "Lie"; 3. "Saturday Night"; 4. 니가 필요해 "I Need You"; 5. 니가 있어야 할 곳 "So You Can Come Back to Me"; 6. 촛불 하나 "One Candle"; 7. 하늘색 풍선 "Sky Blue Balloon"; 8. 0%; 9. 보통날 "Ordinary Day"; DISC 2-2 : god 15th Anniversary Reunion Concert — 1st Day Highlights; DISC 2-3 : god 15th Anniversary Reunion Concert — Encore Highlights; Disc 3 : god 15th Anniversary Documentary—보통날 "Ordinary Day" The CD features unseen behind-the-scenes footage of the members starting from the production of their eighth album to rehearsals and preparations for their reunion tour. Disc 4 : g.o.d Talk Show — Friday Night All five members sat down for a candid chat about the past, present, and future. Disc 5 : god MV Collection: 1. 어머님께 "To Mother"; 2. 관찰 "Observation"; 3. 사랑해 그리고 기억해 "Love and Remember"; 4. 그대 날 떠난 후로 "After You Left Me"; 5. 거짓말 "Lie"; 6. 하늘색 풍선 "Sky Blue Balloons"; 7. 길 "Road"; 8. "0%"; 9. 편지 "Letter"; 10. 니가 필요해 "I Need You"; 11. Comeback Teaser 박준형 (Park Joon-hyung); 12. Comeback Teaser 데니안 (Danny Ahn); 13. Comeback Teaser 윤계상 (Yoon Kye-sang); 14. Comeback Teaser 손호영 (Son Ho-young); 15. Comeback Teaser 김태우 (Kim Tae-woo); 16. 하늘색 약속 "Blue Sky Promise"; 17. Saturday Night; 18. 우리가 사는 이야기 "The Story of Our Lives"; 19. 바람 "Wind"; CD 1 : god 15th Anniversary Reunion Concert Live CD: 1. 미운오리새끼 "The Ugly Duckling"; 2. 길 "Road"; 3. 0%; 4. 하늘색약속 "Sky Blue Promise"; 5. MENT; 6. "Friday Night"; 7. 관찰 "Observation"; 8. 애수 "Sorrow"; 9. 사랑해 그리고 기억해 "Love and Remember"; 10. 모르죠 "You Don't Know"; 11. 우리가 사는 이야기 "The Story of Our Lives"; 12. 어머님께 "To Mother"; 13. 거짓말 "Lie"; 14. "Saturday Night"; 15. 니가 있어야 할 곳 "So You Can Come Back to Me"; 16. 촛불 하나 "One Candle"; 17. 보통날 "Ordinary Day"

== Music videos ==
Year	Song	Album	Notes	Director	Link
1999	"To Mother" (어머님께)	Chapter 1	Starring Jang Hyuk		
1999	"Observation" (관찰)	Chapter 1			
1999	"Love and Remember" (사랑해 그리고 기억해)	Chapter 2			
1999	"After You Left Me" (그대 날 떠난 후로)	Chapter 2	Starring Shin Min-a	Jung Woo-sung	
2000	"Lies" (거짓말)	Chapter 3	Starring Sung Kang		
2000	"I Need You" (니가 필요해)	Chapter 3	Starring Cha Tae-hyun and Shin Min-a		
2000	"Sky Blue Balloon" (하늘색 풍선)	Chapter 3	Features clips of the members behind-the-scenes and during concerts		
2001	"Road" (길)	Chapter 4			
2001	"Sad Love" (슬픈사랑)	Chapter 4	Starring Shin Min-a and Jo In-sung		
2001	"You Don't Know" (모르죠)	Chapter 4	Starring Jo In-sung	Jung Woo-sung	
2002	"Letter" (편지)	Chapter 5: Letter	Starring Son Chang-min and Kim Tae-hee		
2002	"0%"	Chapter 5: Letter			
2004	"An Ordinary Day" (보통날)	An Ordinary Day	Starring Lee Chun-hee and Rie Akiba (jp)		
2004	"The Reason Why Opposites Attract" (반대가 끌리는 이유)	An Ordinary Day			
2005	2♡	Into the Sky	Starring Yoo In-young		
2005	"Into the Sky" (하늘속으로)	Into the Sky			
2014	"Story of Our Lives" (우리가 사는 이야기)	Chapter 8	Starring Seo Shin-ae and Lee David		
2014	"Sky Blue Promise" (하늘색 약속)	Chapter 8	Features behind-the-scenes clips of the members		
2014	"Saturday Night"	Chapter 8	Starring Choi Hong-man	Kwon Soon-wook (ko)	
2014	"Wind" (바람)	Chapter 8 (repackaged edition)	Features behind-the-scenes clips of the 15th anniversary national tour		
2015	"A Funny But Sad Day" (웃픈 하루)	g.o.d Single Album		Hong Won-ki (Zanybros)	
2018	"Snowfall" (눈이 내린다)	Then & Now	Starring Kim Dong-wook and Shin Hye-sun		

=== Other appearances ===
Year	Artist(s)	Song	Album	Notes	Link
2000	Jang Hyuk	"god Bless TJ"	TJ Project	Features behind-the-scenes clips of g.o.d members and Jang Hyuk	
2001	Cha Tae-hyun	"I Love You"	Accident		
2003	One Two (ko)	"Now, Hips" (자 엉덩이)		Also ft. Park Jin-young	
