= Yume wo Kasanete =

"Yume wo Kasanete/Just in Love"
- Japanese single cover

Single by S.E.S.

from the album Reach Out and Surprise
- B-side: "Little Bird"
- Released: February 21, 1999 (Japan); July 11, 2001 (South Korea)
- Genre: Pop; R&B
- Length: 4:49
- Label: VAP; SM
- Composers: Satoshi Shimano; Yoon Chi-woong
- Lyricists: Satoshi Shimano; S.E.S.

S.E.S. singles chronology
"I'm Your Girl (Kreva Mix)" (1998)	"Yume wo Kasanete/Just in Love" (1999)	"Ai to Iu Na no Hokori" (1999)

S.E.S. Korean singles chronology
"Be Natural" (2000)	"Just in Love" (2001)	"U" (2002)

Music video
- "Yume wo Kasanete" on YouTube "Just in Love" on YouTube

"Yume wo Kasanete" (夢をかさねて; lit. Dreaming Over and Over) is a song by South Korean girl group S.E.S., originally released in Japan under VAP on February 21, 1999. In South Korea, it was released as "Just in Love" (Korean: 꿈을 모아서; RR: Kkumeul moaseo) under SM Entertainment on July 11, 2001. "Just in Love" served as the lead single for the group's Korean compilation album Surprise (2001).

== Background and release ==
Written and produced by Satori Shimano, "Yume wo Kasanete" served as the second single for S.E.S.'s debut Japanese studio album Reach Out, which was released on March 10, 1999. The single included a B-side track titled "Little Bird". It peaked at number 83 on the Oricon Singles Chart and sold over 2,400 physical copies in Japan.

In South Korea, "Yume wo Kasanete" was translated into Korean and retitled as "Just in Love", serving as the single for their 2001 compilation album Surprise. The Korean lyrics were written by the S.E.S. members.

== Music videos and promotion ==
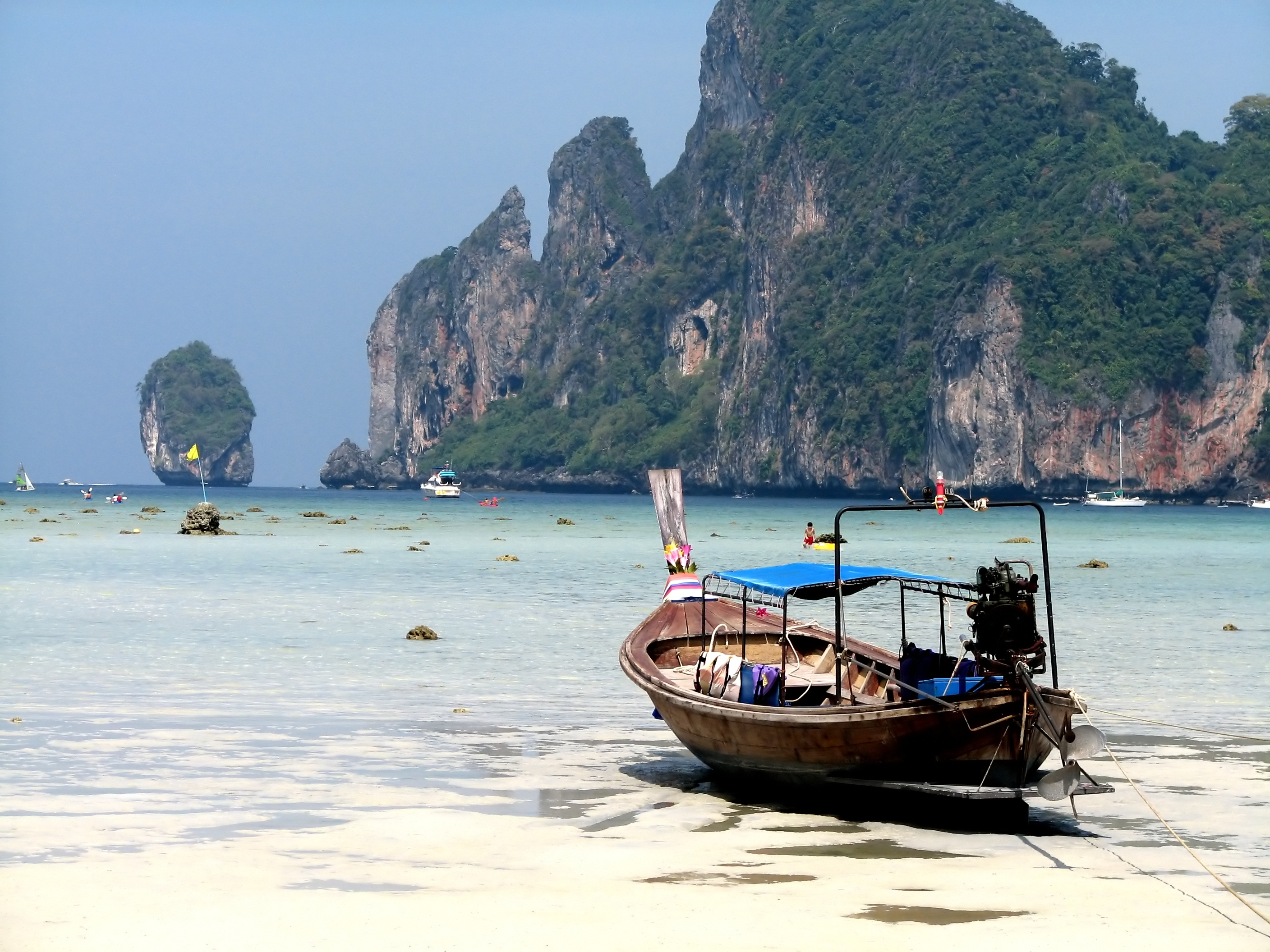
"Just in Love" was filmed in Thailand (pictured).

Music videos were produced for both releases in Japan and South Korea. "Just in Love" was filmed in Phi Phi Islands, Thailand. "Yume wo Kasanete" was featured in Fuji TV's lifestyle information program Refreshing! in 1999.

== Covers ==
In July of 2017, Joy of Red Velvet covered "Just in Love" under the alias of Bandabi in the 2nd round of King of Masked Singer. WJSN Chocome covered "Just in Love" on It's Live in 2022. Nmixx covered the song at the 2023 MBC Gayo Daejejeon on December 31.

== Accolades ==
At the 2001 Mnet Music Video Festival, the song was nominated for Best Dance Performance and Best Female Group, winner the latter.

Awards and nominations for "Just In Love"
Year	Award	Category	Result	Ref.
2001	Mnet Music Video Festival	Best Female Group	Won	
2001	Mnet Music Video Festival	Best Dance Performance	Nominated	

Music program awards for "Just In Love"
Program	Date
Inkigayo	September 2, 2001

== Track listing ==
Japanese CD single

1. "Yume wo Kasanete" (夢をかさねて) – 4:49
2. "Little Bird" – 4:29
3. "Yume wo Kasanete" (Instrumental) – 4:48

== Credits and personnel ==
- S.E.S.
  - Bada – vocals, Korean lyrics
  - Eugene – vocals, Korean lyrics
  - Shoo – vocals, Korean lyrics
- Satoshi Shimano – composer, arranger (1999ver.)& Japanese lyrics
- Yoon Chi-woong – arranger (2001ver.)

== Charts ==
Chart (1999)	Peak position
Japan Singles (Oricon)	83
Taiwan Singles (IFPI Taiwan)	9

== Release history ==
Release history and formats
Region	Date	Version	Label
Japan	February 21, 1999	"Yume wo Kasanete" – CD single	VAP
South Korea	July 11, 2001	"Just in Love" Korean version	SM Entertainment
