= I'm Your Girl =

"I'm Your Girl" may refer to:

- a hit Rodgers and Hammerstein song from Me and Juliet
- I'm Your Girl, a song by S.E.S. from Reach Out (S.E.S. album)
- I'm Your Girl (album), an album by S.E.S.
- "I'm Your Girl", 1967 song by Jackie Verdell
- "I'm Your Girl", 2016 song by Dove Cameron and Sofia Carson
