= An Ordinary Day =

An Ordinary Day may refer to:

- "An Ordinary Day" (song), by g.o.d
- An Ordinary Day (album), by g.o.d
