= Surprise (S.E.S. album) =

Compilation album by S.E.S.
- Released: July 11, 2001
- Recorded: 2001
- Genres: K-pop; dance
- Length: 1:02:23
- Language: Korean
- Label: SM

S.E.S. chronology
Here & There - S.E.S. Singles Collection (2001)	Surprise (2001)	Choose My Life-U (2002)

Singles from Surprise
- 1. "Just In Love" Released: July 11, 2001

Surprise is the first compilation album by South Korean girl group S.E.S., released by SM Entertainment on July 11, 2001. The record is composed of Korean versions of the group's Japanese songs. "Just In Love" (originally "Yume wo Kasanete") was released as a single. A bonus track, "Fate World" (a Korean version of "Meguriau Sekai"), is included. The album sold over 357,000 copies in South Korea.

== Commercial performance ==
Surprise peaked at number three on the MIAK monthly album chart in July 2001, selling 250,627 copies within the month. It was ranked the 16th best-selling album of the year in South Korea, having sold nearly 358,000 copies.

== Track listing ==
Surprise track listing
No.	Title	Length
1.	"In the Name of Love" (사랑이라는 이름의 용기)	5:15
2.	"Unh... Happy Day"	5:14
3.	"Just In Love" (꿈을 모아서)	4:50
4.	"Like a Shooting Star"	5:42
5.	"W/O/U" (Eugene solo)	4:17
6.	"A Song for You" (Bada solo)	4:30
7.	"Little Bird"	3:57
8.	"Believe in Love"	5:04
9.	"Love Is Day by Day"	4:33
10.	"Searchin' for My Love"	4:46
11.	"Sweety Humming" (Shoo solo)	4:49
12.	"Beyond the Moon"	4:27
13.	"Fate World" (운명적인 세상; Hidden track)	4:59
Total length:		1:02:23

== Charts ==
=== Monthly charts ===
Chart (2001)	Peak position
South Korean Albums (MIAK)	3

=== Year-end charts ===
Chart (2001)	Position
South Korean Albums (RIAK)	16

== Sales ==
Region	Sales
South Korea (RIAK)	357,986
