= Be Natural =

2000 song recorded by South Korean girl group S.E.S.

Single by S.E.S.

from the album A Letter from Greenland
- Language: Korean
- Released: December 22, 2000
- Genre: Jazz-pop
- Length: 4:41
- Label: SM
- Songwriter: Yoo Young-jin
- Producer: Yoo Young-jin

S.E.S. singles chronology
"Show Me Your Love" (2000)	"Be Natural" (2000)	"Just In Love" (2001)

"Be Natural" is a song recorded by South Korean girl group S.E.S. for their fourth studio album, A Letter from Greenland. It was released in conjunction with the album through SM Entertainment on December 22, 2000. The song was composed, written, and arranged by SM songwriter Yoo Young-jin.

== Background ==
"Be Natural" was one of the two singles promoted for S.E.S.'s fourth studio album A Letter from Greenland, alongside "Show Me Your Love". The album was commercially successful in South Korea, where it peaked atop the MIAK monthly album chart in December 2000. It sold over 635,000 copies by the end of 2001. "Be Natural" was later included on the group's greatest hits album S.E.S. Best, which was released in July 2002 in Japan.

== Music video and promotion ==
The music video for "Be Natural" features Bada sporting a short haircut and a more tomboyish look. In July 2001, the music video was voted the best video of the first half of the year in a survey conducted by Mnet, with 54% of the votes. S.E.S. promoted the song on domestic music programs such as Music Camp in March and April 2001.

== Red Velvet version ==
"Be Natural"

Single by Red Velvet featuring Taeyong
- Language: Korean
- Released: October 13, 2014
- Studio: SM Booming System (Seoul)
- Genre: R&B; soul; jazz-pop
- Length: 4:41
- Label: SM
- Songwriter: Yoo Young-jin
- Producer: Yoo Young-jin

Red Velvet singles chronology
"Happiness" (2014)	"Be Natural" (2014)	"Automatic" (2015)

Music video
- "Be Natural" on YouTube

"Be Natural" was recorded by South Korean girl group Red Velvet in 2014. A cover of the 2000 song by S.E.S. of the same name, it was recorded by the then-quartet Red Velvet and released by SM Entertainment as a digital single on October 13, 2014. Written and produced by SM songwriter Yoo Young-jin, the jazz-influenced R&B track was the group's second digital release in 2014, featuring a rap verse from then-SM Rookies Lee Tae-yong, who would later be the leader of South Korean boy group NCT and NCT 127. It also marked as their first single to be released under the "Velvet" concept with a drastic change to a mature, more-sultry image, and also the group's last release as a quartet.

Upon its release, "Be Natural" was regarded as a fan favorite for the group's image and musical diversity. The song, however, only managed to peaked at number 33 on the Gaon Digital Chart. It also peaked at number 6 on the US Billboard World Digital Songs chart. It won Best Remake Song at the SBS MTV Best of the Best Awards.

=== Background and release ===
As part of promotions for SM Entertainment's pre-debut group SM Rookies, which three of the members were a part of, a performance video of "Be Natural" by member Irene and Seulgi (then-known as SR14G) was uploaded onto the label's YouTube channel on July 17, 2014, shortly before the video teaser for "Happiness" 10 days later. The record used in the performance was also re-recorded.

The first teaser was released on October 6, 2014, showing all four girls in suits, hinting at a transition to a more mature concept from their first single, "Happiness". More teasers were released before the group made their comeback stage on M! Countdown on October 9. S.M. Entertainment released the music video for the song on their official YouTube account hours later. The single, on the other hand, wasn't released digitally until October 13.

=== Composition ===
"Be Natural"
"Be Natural" is an R&B song with strong influence from soul and jazz elements.

"Be Natural" is mainly an R&B song composed and arranged solely by songwriter Yoo Young-jin, with strong influence from soul and jazz elements. It also contained a rap verse, performed by Hyuggie in the original version and then-SR14B's Taeyong. For the re-recorded version by Red Velvet, the arrangement and rap verse remained the same to the original version by S.E.S., composed in the key of B♭ minor with a tempo of 89 beat-per-minute. Lyrically, the only difference between the two versions is that each rapper says his own name before the rap.

=== Music video and promotion ===
The music video shows the original choreography seen in the pre-debut performance of members Irene and Seulgi.

The music video was directed by SM performance director, Shim Jae-won, who also worked with renowned choreographer, Kyle Hanagami, for the choreography. The original choreography of the music video was seen in the pre-debut performance of members Irene and Seulgi. The music video includes dynamic movements of camera on which was shot using one-take techniques. It also featured then-SR14B member Taeyong performing the rap verse, instead of not including the rappers in the original video by S.E.S. in 2000.

Following the music video release, Red Velvet began the promotion for "Be Natural" on Mnet's M! Countdown on October 9, followed by performances on Music Bank, Show! Music Core, Inkigayo and Show Champion. The girlgroup would then perform the song again as a dance section during their first concert Red Room in 2017, which also marked their first time performing it as a quintet since member Yeri joined the group shortly after its release in October 2014.

=== Credits and personnel ===
Credits adapted from the CD liner notes.

Studio

- Recorded and mixed at SM Booming System
- Mastered at Sonic Korea

Personnel

- Red Velvet (Irene, Seulgi, Wendy, Joy) – vocals
- Yoo Young-jin – producer, songwriter, brass, recording, mixing
- HYUGGIE – rap
- Won Hyun-jung – background vocals
- Kim Hyo-soo – background vocals
- Groovie K – guitar
- Lee Jung-sik – saxophone
- Lim Jae-pil – trumpet
- Shin Dong-sik – trombone
- Yoo Chang-yong – recording assistant
- Yoo Han-jin – recording assistant
- Jeon Hoon – mastering

=== Charts ===
Weekly charts
Chart (2014)	Peak position
South Korea (Gaon)	33
US World Digital Songs (Billboard)	6

=== Release history ===
Release dates and formats for "Be Natural" by Red Velvet
Region	Date	Format	Label	Ref.
South Korea	October 9, 2014	Promotional CD	SM Entertainment; KT Music	
Various	October 13, 2014	Digital download; streaming	SM Entertainment; KT Music	
