= S.E.S. Remixed – Dal Ri Gi/Just a Feeling =

S.E.S. Remixed - Dal Ri Gi/Just A Feeling

Remix album by S.E.S.
- Released: August 29, 2002
- Genre: K-pop, dance
- Language: Korean
- Label: SM Entertainment
- Producer: Lee Soo-man

S.E.S. chronology
| S.E.S. Best (2002) | S.E.S. Remixed - Dal Ri Gi/Just A Feeling (2002) | Friend (2002) |

S.E.S. Remixed - Dal Ri Gi/Just A Feeling is a remix album released by S.E.S. in 2002. It has sold approximately 3,000 copies. It includes remixes of two songs from their fifth album.

== Track listing ==
1. 달리기 (J-Bait Disco Mix)
2. Just A Feeling (Liquid Electro Mix)
3. 달리기 (Vibe 7 Bossa Nova Mix)
4. Just A Feeling (Vibe 7 Timber Mix)
5. 달리기 (Gump Fusion Mix)
6. Just A Feeling (Oliver Techno Mix)
