= Remember (S.E.S. album) =

- Digital edition cover

Studio album by S.E.S.
- Released: January 2, 2017
- Recorded: 2016–2017
- Genres: R&B; new jack swing; jazz; dance
- Length: 39:16
- Language: Korean
- Labels: SM; KT Music

S.E.S. chronology
Beautiful Songs (2003)	Remember (2017)

Alternative cover
- Physical edition cover

Singles from Remember
- 1. "Love [story]" Released: November 28, 2016; 2. "Remember" Released: January 1, 2017; 3. "Paradise" Released: January 2, 2017

Remember is the sixth Korean-language studio album (and eighth overall) by South Korean girl group S.E.S. It was released on January 2, 2017, through SM Entertainment. After disbandment in December 2002, the group reunited for the album's release to celebrate their twentieth anniversary since debut (in 1997 with the album I'm Your Girl). Remember marks the first release of original material by the group since Choose My Life-U in 2002, and first official release since the compilation album Beautiful Songs in 2003.

After the release of the buzz single "Love [story]" on November 28, the main singles "Remember" and "Paradise" were released on January 1 and 2, respectively—the latter accompanying the album's release. The record peaked at number 7 on the Gaon Album Chart.

== Background and development ==
After S.E.S. became inactive in 2002, they officially disbanded in 2003 due to the expiration of the contracts of Bada and Eugene, who decided to part ways with SM Entertainment. All of the three former members went on to pursue solo careers in music and acting. Shoo eventually also left the company in 2006. In 2007, the three members reunited to celebrate their 10th anniversary, and in 2008, they appeared as a group on the South Korean show Happy Sunday. In October 2009, they made another appearance together as a group on the show Come To Play.

In 2014, the members, minus Eugene, who was pregnant at the time, reunited one more time for the Infinite Challenge 1990s-themed special Saturday, Saturday, I Am A Singer. At the occasion, Eugene was represented by Girls' Generation member Seohyun. On May 28, 2016, S.E.S attended the charity event Green Heart Bazaar. A few months later, on October, it was announced that S.E.S. would make an official comeback to the music scene in 2016, almost 20 years since the release of their debut album. On November 23, the group's schedule was revealed by their record label, with the official announcement of a special celebrative album.

== Release and singles ==
On November 28, through SM Entertainment's digital music project SM Station, the group released "Love [story]". The track served as a buzz single for their upcoming official comeback. A music video was released on December 29, 2016, compiling scenes of their early days as a group. Later, on December 29, a music video for the song was uploaded onto SM Town's official YouTube channel, consisting of a series of old footage of the group.

On the same day, music video teasers for the two main singles "Remember" and "Paradise" were released, and promotional photographs of the members were shared in social media. "Remember" was released as the first main single on January 1, 2017, along with its music video, with features Shoo's son Lim Yoo making a cameo appearance. "Paradise" was released as the second and also final single on January 2, 2017, with its music video release. It also accompanied the album's release.

== Composition ==
The album has a total of ten tracks - six originals (namely "Candy Lane", "Remember", "Paradise", "Birthday", "My Rainbow", and "Hush"), three remakes of previous singles "Life", "The Light", and "Love [story]", and an English version of the title track "Remember". The album's first single "Love [story]" is an R&B song; it is a remake compromising two previous songs, "I'm Your Girl" (1997) and "Love" (1999). Second single and title track "Remember" is a mid-tempo pop ballad song written and composed by the members themselves, combining piano melody and string orchestra, while the third and final single "Paradise" is a new jack swing song produced by Mike Daley, Mitchell Owens, and Yoo Young-jin. The three producers were also involved in labelmate SHINee's fifth album 1 of 1 and its repackage 1 and 1, both released in 2016. The album also contains hints of jazz, most notably on the track "Candy Lane".

== Commercial performance ==
Remember entered and peaked at number 7 on the Gaon Album Chart on the chart issue dated January 1–7, 2017. In its second week, the album fell to number 65. The pre-release single "Love [story] entered and peaked at number 22 on the Gaon Digital Chart on the chart issue dated November 27 – December 3, 2016, with 63,930 downloads sold. The next single "Remember" entered and peaked at number 48 on the chart issue dated January 1–7, 2017, selling 38,561 downloads. "Paradise" entered at number 95 on the component Download Chart of the Gaon Digital Chart during the same week, selling 15,854 downloads.

== Promotion ==
Promotions started with a ten-episode reality show called "Remember - I'm Your S.E.S.", airing in the mobile video app Oksusu, with first episode airing on December 5. The trio also appeared in You Hee-Yeol's Sketchbook, performing some of their earlier songs. The trio had also been scheduled to appear as hosts in an episode of Saturday Night Live Korea to be aired on December 17, but the appearance was cancelled because member Eugene injured her ankle while filming the group's comeback music videos.

The trio also announced a special concert called "Remember, The Day", to be held on December 30 and 31 at the Daeyang Hall at Sejong University in Seoul, South Korea. It is their first solo concert since 2000. Before the first concert, the group held a press conference to discuss about the process of making the album. They also performed in the 2016 MBC Gayo Daejejeon, which aired on December 31. It's their first time in the festival since 2002. They performed their 1997 debut single "I'm Your Girl" and the single "Remember". On March 1, they held a fanmeet called "I Will Be There, Waiting For You".

== Track listing ==
Remember track listing
No.	Title	Lyrics	Music	Arrangement	Length
1.	"Candy Lane"	Shin Agnes (MonoTree)	DK Choo (MonoTree); Felicia Barton; Aaron Benward	DK Choo (MonoTree)	3:19
2.	"Remember"	S.E.S.	Erik Lidbom; Fast Lane; Lisa Desmond	Erik Lidbom	4:04
3.	"Paradise" (한 폭의 그림)	Yoo Young-jin	Yoo Young-jin; Mike Daley; Mitchell Owens	Yoo Young-jin; Mike Daley; Mitchell Owens	3:30
4.	"Birthday"	G-High; Shin Agnes (MonoTree)	G-High; Shin Agnes (MonoTree)	G-High (MonoTree)	3:39
5.	"My Rainbow" (친구-세번째 이야기)	Seo Ji-eum	Carolyn Jordan; Mats Ymell; Carl Flemsten	Mats Ymell	4:16
6.	"Hush"	Iseulan; Bong Eun-yeong	Teddy Riley; Lee Hyun-seung; DOM; Daniel "Obi" Klein; Charli Taft	Teddy Riley; Lee Hyun-seung; DOM; Daniel "Obi" Klein; Charli Taft	3:55
7.	"Life" (산다는 건 다 그런 게 아니겠니)	Cho Byung-suk	Cho Byung-suk	Hwang Hyun (MonoTree)	3:56
8.	"The Light" (그대로부터 세상 빛은 시작되고)	Lee Soo-man	Hong Jong-hwa	Yoo Young-jin; Yoo Han-jin	4:29
9.	"Love [story]"	Yoo Young-jin	Yoo Young-jin	Yoo Han-jin	3:59
10.	"Remember" (English version)	Erik Lidbom; Fast Lane; Lisa Desmond	Erik Lidbom; Fast Lane; Lisa Desmond	Erik Lidbom	4:04
Total length:					39:16

== Charts ==
=== Weekly charts ===
Chart (2017)	Peak position
South Korea (Gaon)	7

== Release history ==
Region	Date	Format	Label	Ref.
South Korea	January 2, 2017	CD; digital download	SM Entertainment; KT Music	
Various	January 2, 2017	Digital download	SM Entertainment	
