= Be Ever Wonderful =

Studio album by S.E.S.
- Released: May 24, 2000
- Recorded: 1999–2000
- Genres: J-pop; dance
- Length: 46:36
- Language: Japanese
- Label: VAP
- Producer: VAP

S.E.S. chronology
Prime~S.E.S. The Best (2000)	Be Ever Wonderful (2000)	A Letter from Greenland (2000)

Singles from Be Ever Wonderful
- 1. "Love ~Itsumademo Onje Kajima~" Released: April 21, 2000; 2. "Umi no Aurora" Released: July 21, 2000

Be Ever Wonderful is the third Japanese studio album by S.E.S. It was released on May 24, 2000, under VAP. The album peaked at number 93 on the Oricon Albums Chart and sold over 2,700 copies in Japan.

== Singles ==
"Love ~Itsumademo Onje Kajima~" was the first single from the album and the group's sixth full Japanese single. It was released on April 21, 2000, and featured the track "Round & Round" as the b-side. "Umi no Aurora" was the second single from the album, and the group's overall "6.5" Japanese single. It was released July 21, 2000, and sold approximately 3,000 copies.

Track listing – "Umi no Aurora"

1. "Umi no Aurora" (Single Version)
2. "Umi no Aurora" (Northern Lights Mix)
3. "Umi no Aurora" (Blizzard Mix)
4. "Umi no Aurora" (Instrumental)

== Track listing ==
Be Ever Wonderful track listing
No.	Title	Length
1.	"Brand New ★ World"	3:52
2.	"Do & Be" (Shoo solo)	4:02
3.	"A Song For You" (Bada solo)	4:31
4.	"W/O/U" (Eugene solo)	4:43
5.	"Love ~Itsumademo Onje Kajima~ (Love ~いつまでもオンジェ・カジナ~)"	4:12
6.	"To: My Sweety Lover"	3:48
7.	"Umi no Aurora (海のオーロラ)"	5:14
8.	"Life -This is the Power-"	3:49
9.	"Miracle"	4:01
10.	"Round and Round"	4:09
11.	"Love ~Itsumademo Onje Kajima~" (Grass Roots Mix)	4:07
Total length:		46:28

== Charts ==
Chart (2000)	Peak position
Japanese Albums (Oricon)	93
