= Love (S.E.S. song) =

- Japanese single cover

Single by S.E.S.

from the album Love and Be Ever Wonderful
- Released: October 29, 1999; April 21, 2000 (Japan)
- Studio: SM Digital Recording Studios (Seoul)
- Genre: Dance-pop
- Length: 4:12
- Label: SM; VAP
- Composer(s): Yoo Young-jin
- Lyricist(s): Yoo Young-jin

S.E.S. singles chronology
"Shy Boy" (1998)	"Love" (1999)	"Twilight Zone" (1999)

Japanese singles chronology
"Sign of Love" / "Miracle" (1999)	"Love" (2000)	"Umi no Aurora" (2000)

Music video
- "Love" on YouTube

"Love" is a song by South Korean girl group S.E.S. recorded in Korean and Japanese. The Korean version served as the title track for the group's third Korean studio album of the same name, released under SM Entertainment on October 29, 1999. In Japan, "Love ~Itsumademo Onje Kajima~" was the group's sixth Japanese single under VAP, released on April 21, 2000. It served as the first single for their sophomore Japanese studio album Be Ever Wonderful (2000).

== Music video ==
The music video for "Love" was shot in New York City. It was one of the most expensive music videos produced in South Korea at the time with a reported budget of around $1 million.

== Covers ==
Ive's Wonyoung covered the song at the 2022 KBS Song Festival.

== Track listing ==
Japanese CD single

1. "Love ~Itsumademo Onje Kajima~" (Love ~いつまでもオンジェ·カジナ~) – 4:12
2. "Round & Round" – 4:15
3. "Round & Round" (Again And Again Mix) – 4:15
4. "Love ~Itsumademo Onje Kajima~" (Instrumental) – 4:12

== Charts ==
Chart (2000)	Peak position
Japan Singles (Oricon)	100
