= A Letter from Greenland =

Studio album by S.E.S.
- Released: December 22, 2000
- Recorded: 2000
- Studios: SM Digital Recording Studio; SM Booming System; AC+E Studio
- Genres: R&B; Jazz-pop
- Length: 55:22
- Language: Korean
- Label: SM

S.E.S. chronology
Be Ever Wonderful (2000)	A Letter from Greenland (2000)	Here & There – S.E.S. Singles Collection (2001)

Alternative cover

Singles from A Letter from Greenland
- 1. "Show Me Your Love" Released: December 22, 2000; 2. "Be Natural" Released: December 22, 2000

A Letter from Greenland is the fourth studio album by South Korean girl group S.E.S., released on December 22, 2000, by SM Entertainment and distributed by Avex Asia. A Korean-language cover of Japanese singer Misia's single "Tsutsumikomu Yō ni..." (1998) called "Show Me Your Love", served as the album's lead single and promotions along with single "Be Natural".

Commercially, A Letter from Greenland peaked at number one of the MIAK monthly album chart in December 2000. It has since sold over 635,000 copies in South Korea.

== Commercial performance ==
A Letter from Greenland experienced commercial success in South Korea. It peaked at number one on the monthly MIAK album chart in December 2000 with initial sales of 445,600 copies, making it the 16th best-selling album of 2000 despite being released at the end of the year. The album sold an additional 190,113 copies in 2001 and was ranked the 37th best-selling album of the year.

== Music videos ==
Music videos were produced for the singles "Show Me Your Love" and "Be Natural". In July 2001, the latter was voted the best music video of the first half of 2001 in a survey conducted by Mnet.

== Covers ==
In October 2014, Red Velvet re-recorded their single "Be Natural" and released as the group's second single, featuring NCT's Taeyong. Other artists who have covered "Be Natural" include Everglow in 2019 and (G)I-dle's Miyeon and Minnie on a M Countdown special stage in March 2020.

== Accolades ==
Awards and nominations
Year	Award	Category	Result	Ref.
2001	Golden Disc Awards	Popularity Award (for "Show Me Your Love")	Won	
2001	Golden Disc Awards	Album Bonsang (Main Prize)	Nominated	

Music show wins for "Show Me Your Love"
Program	Date
Music Bank	February 8, 2001
Music Bank	February 15, 2001
Music Bank	February 22, 2001
Inkigayo	February 18, 2001
Inkigayo	February 25, 2001
Music Camp	February 10, 2001
Music Camp	February 17, 2001
Music Camp	February 24, 2001

== Track listing ==
No.	Title	Lyrics	Music	Arrangement	Length
1.	"Be Natural"	Yoo Young-jin	Yoo Young-jin	Yoo Young-jin	4:41
2.	"Slip Away"	Bada	Kim Hyeong-seok	Kim Hyeong-seok	3:22
3.	"I Will..."	Yoo Young-jin	Yoo Young-jin	Yoo Han-jin	4:44
4.	"Show Me Your Love" (감싸안으며)	S.E.S.	Satoshi Shimano	Kang Won-seok; Yoo Han-jin	5:41
5.	"Goodbye to My Love" (나를 위한 이별)	Lee Jin-kyung	Lee Moon-su; Lee Jae-won	Lee Moon-su; Lee Jae-won	3:55
6.	"Long Long Time"	Bada	Hongseok; Roh Young-joo	Hongseok	3:53
7.	"Beautiful Life"	Chee Guk-hyun	Chee Guk-hyun	Chee Guk-hyun	4:30
8.	"Joy"	Yoo Chang-yong	Yoo Chang-yong	Yoo Chang-yong	3:31
9.	"Story"	Bada	Kim Hyeong-seok	Kim Hyeong-seok	4:00
10.	"Chance"	Bae Hwa-young	Go Yeong-jo	Lee Jun-ho	3:44
11.	"Melody" (그대 맘도 나와 같다면)	Bada	Kim Seok-chan	Jun Jun-kyu	4:06
12.	"Wish"	Kang Won-seok	Kang Won-seok	Kang Won-seok	3:41
13.	"Tiny Little Things"	Choi Cheol-gi; Bada	Choi Cheol-gi	Choi Cheol-gi	4:11
14.	"Rain"	Cho Nam-joon	Cho Nam-joon	Kim Ji-woong	4:03
15.	"Ghetto Style (Hidden Track)"	Hwang Hyun-suk	Han Guk-hyeon	Han Guk-hyeon	3:40
Total length:					55:22

== Credits and personnel ==
S.E.S.

- Bada – vocals, lyricist
- Eugene – vocals
- Shoo – vocals

Recording

- Recorded at SM Digital Recording Studio, Seongdong-gu, Seoul
- Recorded & mixed at SM Booming System (1, 3, 8)
- Recorded at AC+E Studio; mixed at King Studio (2, 9)
- Mastered at Sonic Korea

Staff

- KAT – mixing, recording (3,8)
- Yoo Young-jin – mixing, recording (1, 3, 8)
- Do Jeong-ho – mixing, recording (2, 9)
- Yeo Du-hyeon – mixing, recording (2, 9)
- Won Chang-jun – recording (2, 9)
- Jeon Hoon – mastering
- Yoo Chang-yong – engineer assistant (1, 3, 8)
- Yoo Han-jin – engineer assistant (1, 3, 8)
- Kim Eun-ae – artwork coordinator
- Jeong Chang-hwan – artwork coordinator
- Kim Kyung-wook – production coordinator
- Cho Ji-young – cover design
- Lee Soo-man – executive producer
- SM Entertainment – executive producer

== Charts ==
=== Monthly charts ===
Chart (2000)	Peak position
South Korean Albums (MIAK)	1

=== Year-end charts ===
Chart (2000)	Position
South Korean Albums (MIAK)	16

Chart (2001)	Position
South Korean Albums (MIAK)	37

== Sales ==
Region	Sales
South Korea (RIAK)	635,713
