= Friend (album) =

Greatest hits album by S.E.S.
- Released: November 21, 2002
- Recorded: 2002
- Genre: Dance
- Length: 38:36
- Language: Korean
- Label: SM; Avex Asia

S.E.S. chronology
S.E.S. Remixed – Dal Ri Gi/Just a Feeling (2002)	Friend (2002)	Beautiful Songs (2003)

Singles from Surprise
- 1. "S.II.S (Soul to Soul)" Released: November 21, 2002

Friend is the second Korean compilation album (marketed as a "special" album) by South Korean girl group S.E.S., released through SM Entertainment on November 21, 2002. It is S.E.S.'s last album to be released in South Korea before going inactive, and then officially disbanding in the following year. The album was also released in some parts of Asia, including the Philippines, Hong Kong and Taiwan.

== Release and reception ==
Friend contained one original song, the single "S.II.S (Soul To Soul)", but it was not promoted by the group. It also contains remix versions of previously released songs. Commercially, the album debuted at number four on the MIAK monthly album chart in November 2002, and was the 66th best-selling album of the year in South Korea with 94,654 copies sold.

== Track listing ==
Friend track listing
No.	Title	Length
1.	"Intro (Dear My Friend)"	0:37
2.	"The Letter" (편지)	3:47
3.	"S.II.S (Soul to Soul)"	3:32
4.	"Season In Love"	3:36
5.	"Sha La La" (샤랄라; Remix)	3:21
6.	"I Love You" (너를 사랑해; Remix)	3:45
7.	"Love Game"	4:27
8.	"Happiness"	3:19
9.	"Just In Love" (꿈을 모아서; Remix)	5:00
10.	"Choose My Life" (Remix)	3:40
11.	"S.II.S (Soul to Soul)" (Instrumental)	3:32
Total length:		38:36

== Charts ==
=== Monthly charts ===
Chart (2002)	Peak position
South Korean Albums (MIAK)	4

=== Year-end charts ===
Chart (2002)	Position
South Korean Albums (RIAK)	66
