= Love (S.E.S. album) =

1999 studio album by S.E.S.

Studio album by S.E.S.
- Released: October 29, 1999
- Recorded: 1999
- Studio: SM Digital Recording Studio (Seoul)
- Genre: K-pop; dance
- Length: 1:18:36
- Language: Korean
- Label: SM
- Producer: Yoo Young-jin; Shin Sung-ho; Seo Yong-geun; Park Jin-young; Bang Si-hyuk; Choi Soo-jung; Lee Jung-hyun; Ji Kook-hyun; Yoon Chi-woong; Park Seong-soo; Park Ki-young; Bada

S.E.S. chronology
| Reach Out (1999) | Love (1999) | Prime: S.E.S. the Best (2000) |

Singles from Love
- 1. "Love" Released: October 29, 1999; 2. "Twilight Zone" Released: October 29, 1999

Love (Korean: 러브; Leobeu) is the third Korean studio album by S.E.S., released in October 29, 1999, by SM Entertainment. It sold 760,475 copies and became the second best-selling Korean girl group album at the time, only behind The Pearl Sisters' My Dear (1968). The lead single of the same name was promoted along with another single "Twilight Zone".

== Background and release ==
The album includes "talk" tracks recorded by the group members before and after each song. Two singles were released from the album: "Love" and "Twilight Zone". The latter single uses the metaphor of a "twilight zone" to represent a state of uncertainty, with its lyrics containing themes of the complexities of love and longing. The song achieved a first place music program award on SBS's Inkigayo.

In Japan, the title track "Love" was recorded in Japanese and released as a single on April 21, 2000. The single was promoted as "Love ~Itsumademo Onje Kajima~" and featured the track "Round and Round" as a b-side. However, it was not commercially successful, peaking at only number 100 on the Oricon Singles Chart with sales of 2,030 copies. In November 2016, "Love" was remade as "Love [Story]" as part of S.E.S.'s 20th anniversary album Remember (2017).

== Commercial performance ==
Love was a commercial success in South Korea upon its release, peaking at number one of the MIAK monthly album chart in October 1999 with 550,030 copies sold. It sold 723,528 total copies in 1999 and was one of the year's best-selling releases. It continued to show strong sales the following year, having accumulated total sales of 760,475 copies by the end of 2000. It remained the second best-selling album by a girl group in South Korea for 21 years until Blackpink's The Album (2020).

== Accolades ==
Awards and nominations for Love
| Year | Ceremony | Category | Result | Ref. |
|---|---|---|---|---|
| 1999 | Golden Disc Awards | Album Bonsang (Main Prize) | Won | |
| 1999 | Golden Disc Awards | Album Daesang (Grand Prize) | Nominated | |
| 1999 | KMTV Korean Music Awards | Main Prize (Bonsang) | Won | |

Music program awards for "Twilight Zone"
| Program | Date |
|---|---|
| Inkigayo | January 23, 2000 |

== Track listing ==
Love track listing
| No. | Title | Lyrics | Music | Length |
|---|---|---|---|---|
| 1. | "Opening Talk" | | | 1:29 |
| 2. | "Twilight Zone" | Yoo Young-jin | Yoo Young-jin | 3:46 |
| 3. | "첫 사랑 (Talk)" | | | 1:29 |
| 4. | "Love" | Yoo Young-jin | Yoo Young-jin | 4:12 |
| 5. | "차차리 당신을 잊고자 할때 (Talk)" | | | 1:29 |
| 6. | "I've Been Waiting for You" | Shin Sung-ho; Kim Yong-ho | Shin Sung-ho | 3:38 |
| 7. | "얼굴 (Talk)" | | | 2:29 |
| 8. | "Blue Sky" | Seo Yong-geun; Lee Woo-cheon | Seo Yong-geun | 4:22 |
| 9. | "그는 없다 (Talk)" | | | 1:44 |
| 10. | "Tell Me" | Choi Seok-young | Shin Sung-ho | 3:45 |
| 11. | "스크램블 (Talk)" | | | 1:21 |
| 12. | "Taming a Playboy" | Park Jin-young | Park Jin-young; Bang Si-hyuk | 3:32 |
| 13. | "웃음; Part 1 (Talk)" | | | 2:08 |
| 14. | "Sharala" (샤랄라) (featuring Shinhwa) | Choi Soo-jung | Choi Soo-jung; Lee Jung-hyun | 3:50 |
| 15. | "아름다운 기억 (Talk)" | | | 2:32 |
| 16. | "Promise" | Ji Kook-hyun | Ji Kook-hyun | 4:24 |
| 17. | "첫 느낌 (Talk)" | | | 3:16 |
| 18. | "Sugar Baby" | Kwon Seong-jun | Yoon Chi-woong | 4:03 |
| 19. | "웃음; Part 2 (Talk)" | | | 2:42 |
| 20. | "Silver" (featuring Eric Mun) | Bada | Park Seong-soo | 4:07 |
| 21. | "결혼식 (Talk)" | | | 1:46 |
| 22. | "Show Me Love" | Park Ki-young | Park Ki-young | 4:13 |
| 23. | "또 다른 나 (Talk)" | | | 2:07 |
| 24. | "Wait" | Bada | Bada; Park Seong-soo | 4:07 |
| 25. | "그를 만났습니다 (Talk)" | | | 3:33 |
| 26. | "누군가를 너무나 사랑할때 (Talk)" | | | 1:13 |
| 27. | "Ending (Talk)" | | | 1:19 |
| Total length: | | | | 1:18:36 |

== Promotion and live performances ==
=== 2000 S.E.S. First Concert ===
S.E.S. held their first live solo concert titled "A Sweet Kiss From The World of Dream" in support of the album. It took place on March 19, 2000, at the Olympic Gymnastics Arena in Seoul and included performances of both their Japanese and Korean songs. A live video CD of the concert was released by SM Entertainment in June 2000.

| Date | City | Country | Venue | Attendance |
|---|---|---|---|---|
| March 19, 2000 | Seoul | South Korea | Olympic Gymnastics Arena | 9,000 |

== Charts ==
=== Monthly charts ===
| Chart (October 1999) | Peak position |
|---|---|
| South Korean Albums (MIAK) | 1 |

=== Yearly charts ===
| Chart (1999) | Position |
|---|---|
| South Korean Albums (RIAK) | 3 |

| Chart (2000) | Position |
|---|---|
| South Korean Albums (MIAK) | 6 |

== Sales ==
| Region | Sales |
|---|---|
| South Korea (RIAK) | 760,475 |
