= Reach Out (S.E.S. album) =

Studio album by S.E.S.
- Released: March 10, 1999
- Recorded: 1998–1999
- Genre: J-pop; dance
- Length: 44:50
- Language: Japanese
- Label: VAP

S.E.S. chronology
Sea & Eugene & Shoo (1998)	Reach Out (1999)	Love (1999)

Singles from Reach Out
- 1. "Meguriau Sekai" Released: October 21, 1998; 2. "Yume wo Kasanete" Released: February 21, 1999

Reach Out is the debut Japanese album by South Korean girl group S.E.S., released under VAP on March 10, 1999. The album spawned the singles "Meguriau Sekai" and "Yume wo Kasanete". Commercially, the album peaked at number 50 on the Oricon Albums Chart and sold over 10,000 copies.

== Background and promotion ==
"Meguriau Sekai" (めぐりあう世界) was the first single from the album and the group's first Japanese single overall. It was released October 21, 1998, and sold approximately 14,000 copies, peaking at number 37 on the Oricon Singles Chart. The single's B-sides were "Believe in Love" and an instrumental version of the title track.

Another single, officially called the "1.5" single, was released on December 10, 1998. It sold approximately 2,000 copies and contained the "Miami DJ Remix" of "Meguriau Sekai" and the "Jon Robinson Groove Mix" of "Believe in Love". Also included were remixes of two of S.E.S.' Korean songs, "I'm Your Girl (Kreva Mix)" and "Oh, My Love (Cyber Soul Mix)", the original versions of which were both on S.E.S.' first Korean album, I'm Your Girl.

The official second single, "Yume wo Kasanete" (夢をかさねて), was released on February 21, 1999. It sold approximately 5,000 copies. Its B-sides were "Little Bird" and an instrumental version of the title track.

== Track listing ==
Reach Out track listing
No.	Title	Lyrics	Music	Arrangement	Length
1.	"Ai Toiu Nano Hokori (愛という名の誇り)"	Mariko Yoshiki	Satori Shimano	Satori Shimano	5:32
2.	"Like a Shooting Star"	Satori Shimano	Satori Shimano	Satori Shimano	5:13
3.	"Yume wo Kasanete (夢をかさねて)"	Satori Shimano	Satori Shimano	Satori Shimano	4:47
4.	"Believe in Love"	Yūho Iwasato	Satori Shimano	Satori Shimano	5:16
5.	"Sweety Humming" (Sweetyハミング)	Miyui	Jentarō Watanabe	Jentarō Watanabe	4:44
6.	"Toki no Shizuku (時の雫)"	Satori Shimano	Satori Shimano	Satori Shimano	4:41
7.	"Searchin' For My Love"	Yūho Iwasato	Takefumi Haketo	Takefumi Haketo	5:03
8.	"Meguriau Sekai (めぐりあう世界)"	Satori Shimano	Satori Shimano	Satori Shimano	4:59
9.	"Little Bird"	Hiromi Mori	Satori Shimano	Satori Shimano	4:25
10.	"Dreams Come True"	Bada	Risto, Yoo Young-jin	Risto, Yoo Young-jin	4:04

== Charts ==
Chart (1999)	Peak position
Japanese Albums (Oricon)	50
