= Into the Sky =

Studio album by g.o.d
- Released: October 28, 2005
- Recorded: 2005
- Genre: K-pop; R&B; Dance pop
- Length: 49:19
- Language: Korean
- Label: JYP; Seoul Records
- Producer: Park Jin-young; Bang Si-hyuk; Kwon Tae-eun "Lunchsong Project"; Seo Eui-beom; Hwang In-beom; Mad Soul Child; Rhee Woo-seok

G.o.d chronology
An Ordinary Day (2004)	Into the Sky (2005)	Chapter 8 (2014)

Singles from Into the Sky
- 1. "Two-Love" Released: October 28, 2005; 2. "Into the Sky" Released: October 28, 2005

Into the Sky is the seventh studio album of the South Korean pop music group g.o.d. Released in October 2005, it was their second release as a quartet following the departure of Yoon Kye-sang as well as their last before going on a nine-year hiatus. The remaining four members all went their separate ways after performing at their last concert in December that year and g.o.d would not officially reunite as a quintet until 2014.

== Track listing ==
All lyrics and music are written and composed by Park Jin-young, except where noted.

Into the Sky track listing
No.	Title	Music	Length
1.	"Year 1999" (1999년)		1:30
2.	"Meeting" (만남; Mannam)		3:29
3.	"From Me to You" (나 그대에게; Na geudaeege)	Park Jin-young; Bang Si-hyuk	3:58
4.	"I Don't Know Your Heart" (니 맘을 몰라; Ni mameul molla)	Park; Kwon Tae-eun "Lunchsong Project"	4:05
5.	"Falling"	Park; Seo Eui-beom	3:36
6.	"It's Alright (feat. G.Soul)"	Park; Bang Si-hyuk	3:56
7.	"No Guilt (feat. narration by Park Soo-hong & Choi Sung-gook)" (무죄)	Park; Lunchsong Project	3:59
8.	"Stay the Night"	Park; Hwang In-beom	3:09
9.	"Change"	Mad Soul Child	4:18
10.	"Crime" (유죄; Yujoe)		3:25
11.	"2♡" (Two-Love)		4:27
12.	"Into the Sky" (하늘속으로; Haneul sok-eu-ro)		4:04
13.	"Two Doors (feat. Park Jin-young)" (두개의 문; Dugae-ui mun)	Park; Rhee Woo-seok	3:38
14.	"Year 2005" (2005년)		1:45
Total length:			49:19

== Awards and nominations ==
The title track and promoted song "2♡" (pronounced "Two Love") won first place on Inkigayo and Music Camp (the former incarnation of Show! Music Core) and it was last song for which g.o.d won #1 on a music program.

Year	Award	Category	Result	Ref.
2005	KBS Music Awards	Singer of the Year (Bonsang)	Won	

== Charts and sales ==
=== Monthly charts ===
Chart (October 2005)	Peak position
South Korean Albums (RIAK)	1

=== Year-end charts ===
Chart (2005)	Position
South Korean Albums (RIAK)	17

=== Sales ===
Region	Sales
South Korea (RIAK)	109,757

== See also ==
- JYP Entertainment discography
