= Chapter 5: Letter =

Studio album by g.o.d
- Released: December 27, 2002
- Recorded: 2002
- Genre: K-pop; R&B; dance pop
- Length: 47:01
- Language: Korean
- Label: Sidus, Yejeon Media
- Producer: Park Jin-young; Jung Hoon-tak; Jung Hae-ik

G.o.d chronology
Chapter 4 (2001)	Chapter 5: Letter (2002)	An Ordinary Day (2004)

Singles from Chapter 5: Letter
- 1. "Letter" Released: December 27, 2002

Chapter 5: Letter is the fifth album of South Korean pop music group g.o.d, released via SidusHQ on December 27, 2002. It was the last album released before the departure of Yoon Kye-sang from the group.

== Reception ==
The group had opted to hold their "100-day Human Concert" series instead of regularly promoting their album on televised music programs and variety shows. Having been away from television for an extended period, sales dipped significantly compared to the fourth album. "0%" won first place on Inkigayo.

== Track listing ==
Chapter 5: Letter track listing
No.	Title	Lyrics	Music	Length
1.	"Like This Again (intro)" (이렇게 또; Ireoke tto)	Park Jin-young	Park Jin-young	0:57
2.	"Letter" (편지; Pyeonji)	Park Jin-young	Park Jin-young	4:11
3.	"Report to the Dance Floor"	Park Jin-young	Bae Jin-ryeol (JR Groove)	3:21
4.	"Give Me a Chance" (기회를 줘; Gihoereul jwo)	Park Jin-young	Park Jin-young; JR Groove	4:30
5.	"Lately" (요즘; Yojeum)	Jeon Seung-woo	Jeon Seung-woo	4:15
6.	"Love Story" (사랑이야기; Sarang-iyagi)	Danny Ahn	Danny Ahn	3:46
7.	"0%" (영 프로; Yeong peuro)	Park Jin-young	Park Jin-young; Bang Si-hyuk	3:49
8.	"A Number I Should Never Have Dialed" (걸어선 안되는 전화; Geoleoseon andeoneun jeonhwa)	Park Jin-young; Bang Si-hyuk	Bang Si-hyuk	5:05
9.	"Love? Love!" (사랑? 사랑!; Sarang sarang)	Kim Tae-woo	Kim Tae-woo	3:16
10.	"Stutter" (더듬고 있어; Deodeumgo isseo)	Park Jin-young; JR Groove	Park Jin-young; JR Groove	3:55
11.	"Tears I Didn't Want to Show" (눈치 없는 눈물; Nunchi eomneun nunmul)	Lee Gyu-tae	Lee Gyu-tae; Yang Jae-seon	3:51
12.	"Us" (우리; Uri)	Son Ho-young	Son Ho-young	3:58
13.	"As We Release Chapter 5" (5집을 내며)	Park Jin-young	Joon Park; Yoon Kye-sang; Danny Ahn; Kim Tae-woo; Son Ho-young	2:09
Total length:				47:01

== Charts and sales ==
=== Monthly charts ===
Chart (December 2002)	Peak position
South Korean Albums (RIAK)	1

=== Year-end charts ===
Chart (2002)	Position
South Korean Albums (RIAK)	12

=== Sales ===
Region	Sales
South Korea (RIAK)	463,038
