= Jae-won =

- Hangul: 재원
- RR: Jaewon
- MR: Chaewŏn
- IPA: [tɕɛwʌn]

Jae-won is a Korean given name.

== People ==
People with this name include:

- Lee Jae-won (singer) (born 1980), South Korean DJ and singer
- Jae Won Lee, Korean-American ceramic artist
- Kim Jaewon (born 1981), South Korean actor
- Min Jaewon (born 1983), Scientist, Columbia University
- One (rapper) (born Jung Jae-won, 1994), South Korean rapper
- Kang Jae-won (born 1965), South Korean handball player
- Jeong Jae-won (born 1969), South Korean rower
- Sim Jae-won (born 1977), South Korean football player
- Hwang Jae-won (born 1981), South Korean football player
- Lee Jae-won (footballer, born 1983), South Korean football player
- Heo Jae-won (born 1984), South Korean football player
- Oh Jae-won (born 1965), South Korean baseball player
- Lee Jae-won (baseball) (born 1988), South Korean baseball player
- Lee Jae-won (footballer, born 1992), South Korean football player
- Chung Jae-won (born 2001), South Korean speed skater
- Roh Jae-won (born 1993), South Korean actor

== See also ==
- List of Korean given names
