= Prime: S.E.S. the Best =

Prime -S.E.S. The Best-

Greatest hits album by S.E.S.
- Released: March 15, 2000
- Recorded: 1999–2000
- Genre: J-pop, dance
- Length: 50:11
- Language: Japanese
- Label: VAP

S.E.S. chronology
Love (1999)	Prime -S.E.S. The Best- (2000)	Be Ever Wonderful (2000)

Singles from Prime -S.E.S. The Best-
- 1. "T.O.P. (Twinkling of Paradise)" Released: October 27, 1999; 2. "Sign of Love" / "Miracle" Released: December 8, 1999

Prime -S.E.S. The Best- is the first Japanese compilation album by S.E.S., released under VAP on March 15, 2000. It spawned two singles: "T.O.P. (Twinkling of Paradise)" and the double A-side single "Sign of Love" / "Miracle". The album peaked at number 64 on the Oricon Albums Chart and sold 3,750 copies.

== Singles ==
The album's first single was "T.O.P. (Twinkling of Paradise)", featuring a rap by Verbal of M-Flo. It was S.E.S.' fourth full Japanese single and sold approximately 5,000 copies. It was released on October 27, 1999.

Track listing

1. "T.O.P. (Twinkling of Paradise)" (featuring Verbal)
2. "T.O.P. (Twinkling of Paradise)" (Masters Funk Remix) (featuring Verbal)
3. "Life -This is the Power-"

The double A-side single "Sign of Love" / "Miracle" was the second release spawned from the album and the group's fifth Japanese single. Released on December 8, 1999, it sold approximately 5,000 copies.

Track listing

1. "Sign of Love"
2. "Miracle"
3. "Sign of Love" (DJ Favouret-Club Mix)
4. "Sign of Love" (Instrumental)

== Track listing ==
Prime: S.E.S. the Best track listing
No.	Title	Length
1.	"Twilight Zone" (Japanese version)	3:48
2.	"Shy Boy" (Japanese version)	3:41
3.	"I've Been Waiting For You" (Japanese version)	3:40
4.	"Ai Toiu Nano Hokori (愛という名の誇り)"	5:21
5.	"Yume wo Kasanete (夢をかさねて)"	4:49
6.	"T.O.P. (Twinkling of Paradise)" (featuring Verbal)	4:41
7.	"Unh~Happy Day"	5:15
8.	"Meguriau Sekai (めぐりあう世界)"	5:01
9.	"Shining Star"	4:24
10.	"Sign of Love"	4:51
11.	"Tsuki no Hate Made (月の果てまで)"	4:32
Total length:		50:03

== Charts ==
Chart (2000)	Peak position
Japanese Albums (Oricon)	64
