= Sea & Eugene & Shoo =

Studio album by S.E.S.
- Released: November 23, 1998
- Recorded: SM Digital Recording Studio (Seoul)
- Genre: Dance-pop; R&B
- Length: 39:47
- Language: Korean
- Label: SM

S.E.S. chronology
I'm Your Girl (1997)	Sea & Eugene & Shoo (1998)	Reach Out (1999)

Alternative cover

Singles from Sea & Eugene & Shoo
- 1. "Dreams Come True" Released: November 23, 1998; 2. "I Love You" Released: November 23, 1998; 3. "Shy Boy" Released: November 23, 1998

Sea & Eugene & Shoo is the second studio album by South Korean girl group S.E.S., released through SM Entertainment on November 23, 1998. The record spawned the singles "Dreams Come True", "I Love You" and "Shy Boy", with the first two songs topping the domestic music program charts for multiple weeks.

== Background ==
Sea & Eugene & Shoo was released as the group's second album in November 1998. The album spawned three singles including "Dreams Come True", "I Love You", and "Shy Boy". The songs "Dreams Come True" and "Eternal Love" are 1998 covers of the 1996 tracks "Rakastuin mä looseriin" ("Like a Fool") and "Teflon love" ("Eternal Love") respectively, from the Finnish pop band Nylon Beat. Additionally, the album track "Feeling" is also a cover of their 1997 song "Veit multa frendin" ("Don't Disappoint Me").

== Reception ==
=== Critical reception ===
In an IZM review for Sea & Eugene & Shoo in October 2021, music critic Kim Seong-yeop wrote that "It is an album that builds on the mysterious fairy concept that is still considered a symbol of the group." He additionally noted that "They could have taken the safe route of following the youthful image of their debut song '(Cause) I'm your girl', but they were able to gain a differentiated edge in the battlefield of idol groups by trying experimental music with unique colors."

=== Commercial performance ===
The album was commercially successful in South Korea, peaking at number one on the RIAK monthly album chart for two consecutive months in November and December 1998. In June 1999, it was reported that the album had sold more than 651,000 copies.

== Accolades ==
Music program awards
Song	Program	Date
"Dreams Come True"	Music Bank	December 8, 1998
"Dreams Come True"	Music Bank	January 5, 1999
"Dreams Come True"	Music Bank	January 19, 1999
"Dreams Come True"	Inkigayo	January 10, 1999
"Dreams Come True"	Music Camp	January 23, 1999
"I Love You"	Inkigayo	January 31, 1999
"I Love You"	Inkigayo	February 28, 1999
"I Love You"	Inkigayo	March 7, 1999
"I Love You"	Music Bank	February 9, 1999
"I Love You"	Music Bank	March 2, 1999
"I Love You"	Music Bank	March 16, 1999

== Track listing ==
Sea & Eugene & Shoo track listing
No.	Title	Lyrics	Music	Length
1.	"Shy Boy"	Yoo Young-jin	Yoo Young-jin	3:38
2.	"Dreams Come True"	Bada, Yoo Young-jin	Risto Asikainen, Yoo Young-jin	4:02
3.	"Snow, X-mas"	Kim Seong-hoon	Park Seong-soo	3:54
4.	"I Love You" (너를 사랑해; Neoleul salanghae)	Choi Soo-jeong	Choi Soo-jeong, Lee Jeong-hyun	3:33
5.	"Feeling" (느낌; Neukkim)	Bada	Risto Asikainen	3:44
6.	"비가" (Biga)	Bada	Shin In-soo, Kim Seung-hyun	4:07
7.	"애인 찾기" (Aein chajgi)	Kim Hye-seon	Shin In-soo, Lee Jong-pil	4:17
8.	"For You" (너에게; Neoege)	Park Seong-soo	Park Seong-soo	4:16
9.	"Kiss"	Kim Dong-hyun	Park Seong-soo	4:14
10.	"Eternal Love"	Bada	Risto Asikainen	3:31
Total length:				39:16

== Charts ==
=== Monthly charts ===
Chart (1998)	Peak position
South Korean Albums (MIAK)	1

== Sales ==
Region	Certification	Certified units/sales
South Korea	—	651,330
