= S.E.S. Best =

Greatest hits album by S.E.S.
- Released: July 7, 2002
- Genre: J-pop, dance
- Language: Korean
- Label: Avex Trax

S.E.S. chronology
Choose My Life-U (2002)	S.E.S. Best (2002)	S.E.S. Remixed - 달리기/Just A Feeling (2002)

S.E.S. Best is a greatest hits album released in 2002 by S.E.S. Though it compiles their Korean-language singles (excluding "Show Me Your Love", "Just In Love", and "Just A Feeling"), the album was released only in Japan.

== Track listing ==
1. Requiem
2. Slip Away
3. Love
4. Just A Feeling (Original Version)
5. Be Natural
6. Feeling
7. Someone To Feel
8. Dreams Come True
9. I Will...
10. U
11. Silver
12. ('Cause) I'm Your Girl
13. Red Angel
14. Twilight Zone
15. Oh, My Love
16. Good Bye To My Love
17. Eternal Love
18. Just A Feeling (New Generation Remix)
