= An Ordinary Day (album) =

Studio album by g.o.d
- Released: December 9, 2004
- Recorded: 2004
- Studio: JYP Studios (Seoul)
- Genre: K-pop; R&B
- Language: Korean
- Label: JYP; Seoul Records
- Producer: Park Jin-young; Kwon Tae-eun "Lunchsong Project"

G.o.d chronology
Chapter 5: Letter (2002)	An Ordinary Day (2004)	Into the Sky (2005)

Singles from An Ordinary Day
- 1. "An Ordinary Day" Released: December 9, 2004; 2. "The Reason Why Opposites Attract" Released: December 9, 2004

An Ordinary Day (also called Chapter 6) is the sixth album of the South Korean pop music group g.o.d. It was released in December 2004, nearly two years after their previous album. In between, member Yoon Kye-sang had left the group and pursued acting. The album was their first release as a quartet and since switching from Sidus to JYP Entertainment.

== Overview ==
The album's overall theme is centered around first love, heartbreak and loss. The songs are largely pop or R&B but feature a more diverse array of genres. The Korean-language pop culture website Star News noted that the album showed more of each member's individuality and unique singing and rapping styles compared to their past albums.

== Reception ==
"An Ordinary Day" and "The Reason Why Opposites Attract" won first place on the music programs Inkigayo and Music Camp (the former incarnation of Show! Music Core), with the latter song winning a Triple Crown on Inkigayo.

== In popular culture ==
In 2005, "An Ordinary Day" (보통날) and "Promise" (약속) were chosen as default tunes installed in LG Cyon's 340 series cellular phones. "An Ordinary Day" was chosen by the g.o.d members as the song to be remade for their 2014 reunion album Chapter 8. Original composer Kwon Tae-eun rearranged the song and added a part for Yoon Kye-sang.

In 2014 HyunA's song "From When and Until When" (어디부터 어디까지), which she co-wrote with labelmate Hyunsik of BtoB, attracted attention and some controversy when listeners realized that several lines were exactly the same as the lyrics of the song "The Reason Why Opposites Attract" (반대가 끌리는 이유). HyunA and Hyunsik later admitted that they had intentionally incorporated the lyrics as a fan homage to g.o.d's 15th anniversary reunion that year and apologized for failing to inform songwriter Park Jin-young and the g.o.d members.

== Accolades ==
Music program awards
Song	Program	Date
"An Ordinary Day"	Inkigayo	January 9, 2005
"An Ordinary Day"	Inkigayo	January 16, 2005
"An Ordinary Day"	M Countdown	January 13, 2005
"An Ordinary Day"	M Countdown	January 27, 2005
"An Ordinary Day"	Music Camp	January 22, 2005
"An Ordinary Day"	Music Camp	January 29, 2005
"The Reasons Why Opposites Attract"	Inkigayo	January 30, 2005
"The Reasons Why Opposites Attract"	Inkigayo	February 6, 2005
"The Reasons Why Opposites Attract"	Inkigayo	February 13, 2005
"The Reasons Why Opposites Attract"	Music Camp	February 19, 2005
"The Reasons Why Opposites Attract"	Music Camp	March 5, 2005

== Track listing ==
All lyrics and music are written and composed by Park Jin-young, except where noted.

An Ordinary Day track listing
No.	Title	Lyrics	Music	Length
1.	"The Day Love Was Complete" (사랑이 전부였던 날; Sarang-i jeonbuitdeon nal)	Kwon Tae-eun "Lunchsong Project"	Lunchsong Project	1:13
2.	"Free" (자유)	Park Jin-young; Kim Gwang-jin		3:37
3.	"Circle of Love" (사랑의 동그라미; Sarang-ui donggeurami)			3:33
4.	"The Reason Why Opposites Attract" (반대가 끌리는 이유; Bandaega kkeulrineun iyu)			4:14
5.	"Familiar Strangers" (익숙한 낯선 사람; Iksukhan natseon saram)		Park Jin-young; Danny Ahn	3:41
6.	"Loving You"		Park Jin-young; Woo S. Rhee	3:49
7.	"Tonight (feat. J)"			3:41
8.	"You Totally Musn't! (feat. Kim Jin-pyo)" (절대 안돼; Jeoldae andwae)	Park Jin-young; Kim Jin-pyo		4:07
9.	"Let's Not Separate" (헤어지지 말자; Heeojiji malja)			4:21
10.	"When Love Becomes Troublesome (feat. Lim Jeong-hee)" (사랑이 힘들때; Sarang-i himdeulttae)			3:41
11.	"The Painful Longing Is Worse Than The Break-up" (헤어짐보다 아픈 그리움; Heeojimboda apeun geurium)		Lunchsong Project	4:01
12.	"In the Corner" (한구석에; Hangu seoke)			5:15
13.	"An Ordinary Day" (보통날; Botongnal)		Lunchsong Project	3:32
14.	"Promise" (약속; Yaksok)			3:41
15.	"The Day Love Really Hurt (feat. narration by Kang Gyeong-heon)" (사랑이 너무 아프던 날)			1:51
Total length:				53:56

== Charts and sales ==
=== Monthly charts ===
Chart (December 2004)	Peak position
South Korean Albums (RIAK)	1

=== Year-end charts ===
Chart (2004)	Position
South Korean Albums (RIAK)	18

=== Sales ===
Region	Sales
South Korea (RIAK)	213,187

== See also ==
- JYP Entertainment discography
