= Shoo (singer) =

Zainichi Korean actress and singer (born 1981)

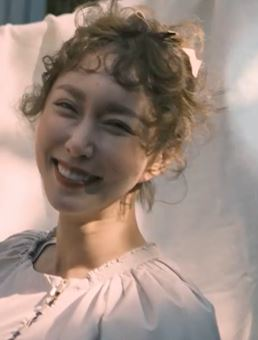
- Shoo in 2017
- Born: Shū Kunimitsu (邦光 洙); 23 October 1981 (age 45); Yokohama, Japan
- Other name: Yoo Soo-young
- Education: Korea Kent Foreign School
- Occupations: Actress; singer
- Years active: 1997–2018, 2022–present
- Spouse: Im Hyo-sung (m. 2010)
- Children: 3
- Musical career
- Genre: K-pop
- Instrument: Vocals
- Label: SM

Korean name
- Hangul: 유수영
- Hanja: 柳水永
- RR: Yu Suyeong
- MR: Yu Suyŏng

Shū Kunimitsu (邦光 洙, Kunimitsu Shū; born 23 October 1981), also known as Yoo Soo-young and professionally as Shoo (Korean: 슈), is a Zainichi-Korean actress and singer.

Shoo debuted as a member of the South Korean girl group S.E.S. in 1997 and continued until 2002 when the group disbanded. She contributed songs as a solo artist after the group's disbandment, before she went on hiatus from her music career to pursue an acting career in 2006. She returned to the music industry, releasing her single album Devote One's Love in 2010. Afterwards, she went back on hiatus for four years to take care of family before transitioning back to acting in 2014. Shoo has appeared in many variety shows, like Oh! My Baby with her family. In 2016, Shoo took part in a special 20th anniversary comeback with her S.E.S group members and the trio released a special album alongside a special concert. In December 2018, Shoo ran into legal issues and went on a hiatus. Upon returning in October 2020, she released her first Japanese digital album I Found Love. Shoo made an official comeback in 2022 with a documentary about her life. In 2022, Shoo was announced as the ambassador of Korean Gambling Prevention Treatment Agency. Shoo is now an entrepreneur and health brand founder. In 2025, Shoo launched Cicagen, a brand where she is actively involved in farming, production, and product development. Her first release, Cica Jelly 1000, reflects her focus on wellness and quality nutrition. While she remains known for her career as a former S.E.S. member, she has shifted towards a new path in business and health-conscious living.

Shoo was born Shū Kunimitsu on 23 October 1981, in Yokohama, Japan. Her parents are ethnic Koreans. After living in Japan for 15 years, Shoo and her family moved to Korea in 1996. She was initially part of a mixed-gender project group with Son Ho-young and Danny Ahn of g.o.d and Kim Hwan-sung of NRG, but she decided to join SM Entertainment after successfully auditioning for the company.

== Career ==
=== 1997–2002: S.E.S. ===
Shoo made her debut with S.E.S. in 1997. The group debuted with the album I'm Your Girl and lead single of the same name on 1 November 1997. The group since went on to become the top-selling K-pop girl group for their generation of artists. Since their debut, the group has released five Korean albums and two Japanese albums. The group officially parted ways in 2002, due to the expiry of their contracts with SM Entertainment. Members Bada and Eugene left SM Entertainment after the expiry of their initial contracts, while Shoo stayed with SM Entertainment until 2006.

=== 2003–2015: solo career ===
Shoo remained signed under SM Entertainment until 2006. In the time during which she was signed, Shoo participated on SM Town albums in 2003 and 2004. In 2006, Shoo departed from SM Entertainment and signed onto JIIN Entertainment. In 2005, she began her stage musical career in the Korean adaptation of Bat Boy: The Musical, which sold over 110,000 tickets in Korea and Japan. In December 2006, she stated that she would pursue acting and would be putting her singing career on hiatus.

In January 2010, Shoo returned to the music scene with the release of her first mini-album, Devote One's Love with the lead track "Only You".

In March 2014, Shoo signed with RUN Entertainment and returned to her career as an actress.

In December 2014, Shoo along with her bandmate Bada made a special comeback on Infinite Challenge, in the episode "Saturday for Singers", and performed two songs ("I'm Your Girl" and "I Love You") with Girls' Generation member Seohyun, who was filling in for Eugene due to her pregnancy, but they stated that she wished they could have performed together. In January 2015, she appeared on the show Roommate with her twin daughters, Im Ra-yool, Im Ra-hee and her husband, Hyo-sung.

=== 2016–2017: S.E.S. reunited ===
On 28 May, Shoo with S.E.S. members Bada and Eugene attended a charity event, Green Heart Bazaar. In October 2016, Shoo along with Bada and Eugene re-formed S.E.S. to celebrate their 20th anniversary since the debut of the group. They started their project of the 20th anniversary debut with released digital single "Love[Story]", a remake of their 1999 single "Love", through SM Entertainment's digital project SM Station on 28 November and its music video released on 29 December.

In early December 2016, they aired their ten episode reality show Remember, I'm Your S.E.S., which broadcast through mobile app Oksusu. To accompany their 20th anniversary debut, they held a concert, Remember, the Day, on 30 and 31 December at Sejong University's Daeyang Hall in Seoul.

On 2 January, the special album of their 20th anniversary debut Remember was released. The album consists of double lead singles. "Remember" was digitally released on 1 January and "Paradise" was released along with the album on 2 January. They held a fanmeet as their last project of 20th anniversary debut called I Will Be There, Waiting For You on 1 March 2017.

=== 2020–present: Solo career ===
On October 7, 2020, Shoo released her first Japanese digital single titled "I Found Live". This marked a significant milestone in her career, as she ventured into the Japanese music market.

In April 2022, Shoo made her comeback to television after a four-year hiatus following her gambling controversy, where her fellow S.E.S. members also appeared with her to show support. Shoo appeared on Star Documentary My Way, where she openly discussed her struggles and the steps she took to rebuild her life and career. The appearance marked her return to the public eye, showing her determination to move forward as a better person

On February 28, 2025, Shoo announced her new entrepreneurial journey with the launch of her Cicagen jelly brand. The brand focuses on organic products using Centella Asiatica, a herb.

== Personal life ==
Shoo married basketball player, Im Hyo-sung on 11 April 2010, at the Seoul Renaissance Hotel. Shoo was pregnant at the time. In June 2010, the couple welcomed their first son, Im Yoo. In April 2013, Shoo gave birth to twin daughters.

In December 2018, Shoo was prosecuted for gambling in several countries, after being sued for not paying back borrowed gambling money.

== Business ventures ==
In 2025, Shoo launched Cicagen, a jelly brand that focuses on health-oriented, organic products made from Centella Asiatica. As the CEO, Shoo is deeply involved in the entire process, from farming to production. The brand's first product, Cica Jelly 1000, uses pure Centella extract and aims to provide an accessible way to enjoy its health benefits. Shoo's commitment to quality and natural ingredients reflects her personal journey toward health and wellness.

== Discography ==
=== Single albums ===
Title	Album details	Peak positions
Title	Album details	KOR
Devote One's Love	Released: 8 January 2010; Label: Es Management, Kakao M; Formats: CD, digital download; Track listing: 1. Intro; 2. Sexy Motion; 3. Other than me (자기밖에); 4. With Me ( with Bada & Eugene); 5. 자기밖에 (Inst.)	18
I Found Love	Released: 7 October 2020; Labels: Diamond Music; Formats: Digital download	—
"—" denotes release did not chart.

=== Collaborations ===
Title	Year	Peak positions	Album
Title	Year	KOR	Album
"Agape" (...지애(之愛)) (with Yoo Young-jin)	2001	—	...지애(之愛) (Agape)
"He Didn't Fall for You" (그 앤 너에게 반하지 않았어) (with Kan Mi-youn)	2006	—	Refreshing
"One Day" (with SoRi)	2006	—	2 Be One
"Yunanhi" (쇼하우) (with Show How)	2008	—	Show How – 1st Mini Album
"—" denotes release did not chart.

=== Participation in albums ===
Title	Year	Peak positions		Album
Title	Year	KOR	JPN	Album
"One [Japanese version]" (with V6)	2002	—	—	Feel Your Breeze / One
"Let's Sing a Song [Japanese version]" (with V6)	2002	—	—	Feel Your Breeze / One
"One [Korean version]" (with V6)	2002	—	—	Feel Your Breeze / One
"Let's Sing a Song [Korean version]" (with V6)	2002	—	—	Feel Your Breeze / One
"One – Japanese version -" (with V6)	2002	—	—	seVen
"One – English version -" (with V6)	2002	—	—	seVen
"Snow in My Mind" (with BoA & M.I.L.K)	2002	—	—	2002 Winter Vacation in SMTown.com – My Angel My Light
"I Miss You" (with Shinvi, Eric Mun & Andy Lee)	2002	—	—	2002 Winter Vacation in SMTown.com – My Angel My Light
"Fell Like" (연인처럼)	2003	—	—	2003 Summer Vacation in SMTown.com
"Summer in Dream" (with Moon Hee-jun, BoA, Jae-won, Seo Hyun-jin, Park Hee-Von)	2003	—	—	2003 Summer Vacation in SMTown.com
"White"	2003	—	—	2003 Winter Vacation in SMTown.com
"Time After Time" (꿈속에서)	2004	—	—	2004 Summer Vacation in SMTown.com
"—" denotes release did not chart.

== Filmography ==
=== Films ===
Year	Title	Role	Notes	Ref.
2008	Santamaria (잘못된 만남)	Yeon-Hee, Kang Il-do's wife.	Supporting role	

=== Dramas ===
Year	Title	Role	Notes	Ref.
2003	20 Years Old	Jeong Soo Yeong		
2008	Urban Legends Deja Vu 3	Hyuna	Main role	

=== Variety show ===
Year	Title	Notes/Ref.
2015	Oh! My Baby	Fixed appearance
2016	King of Mask Singer	as There is No Failure on My Life
2022	My Way	Cast

=== Hosting ===
Year	Shows
2002	SBS Beautiful Sunday
2002	KBS2 Music Bank
2008	O'live Kiss the date
2010	MBC Every 1 Anaeleul Butaghae (아내를 부탁해)
2011	Food TV Super wipe
2015	MBC Apeulika Eolin-i Dobgi Huimang-ui Son-eul Jab-ajuseyo (아프리카 어린이 돕기 희망의 손을 잡아주세요)

== Ambassadorship ==
- Ambassadors solve gambling problems (2022)

== Musical theatre ==
Year	Title	Role	Notes
2001	Dong-A Ryeon (동아비련)	Iwamoto	She was selected as the lead woman of the drama by Fuji TV Japan and Kansai TV. Tokyo, Osaka performances.
2002	Dong-A Ryeon (동아비련)	Iwamoto	Play on Fuji TV and Kansai TV encore
2002	Dong-A Ryeon (동아비련)	Iwamoto	Performances at Korea
2005	Bat Boy: The Musical	Shelley Parker	Performed in five cities in Japan
2006	Bat Boy: The Musical	Shelley Parker	Korean encore performances, 7 cities in Japan
2007	Singin' in the Rain	Yumiri	
2007	High School Musical on Stage!	Taylor McKessie	Japan's musical Fuji TV. Performances at Tokyo and Osaka .
2008	Musical The White Dog (백구)	Baekgu	Hosted by Yale troupe, at OBS Gyeongin TV
2008	Singin' in the Rain	Yumiri	
2012	Resurrection- The Golden Days (부활 – 더 골든 데이즈)	Jimin/ Yoon Hee	
2017	Special Liar (스페셜 라이어)	Mary Smith, John's wife	At Dong Sung Art Center Hall
