= ('Cause) I'm Your Girl =

- Japanese remix single cover

Single by S.E.S. featuring Eric and Andy of Shinhwa

from the album I'm Your Girl
- Released: November 1, 1997
- Recorded: 1997
- Studio: SM Studios, Seoul
- Genre: K-pop; R&B; new jack swing
- Length: 3:45
- Label: SM; VAP
- Composer: Yoo Young-jin
- Lyricist: Yoo Young-jin

S.E.S. singles chronology
"('Cause) I'm Your Girl" (1997)	"Oh, My Love" (1997)

Music video (remastered)
- "I'm Your Girl" on YouTube

"('Cause) I'm Your Girl" is the debut single by South Korean girl group S.E.S., released via SM Entertainment on November 1, 1997, as part of the group's debut studio album I'm Your Girl. An R&B K-pop track, it was both written and produced by SM in-house producer Yoo Young-jin. A remix single of "('Cause) I'm Your Girl" was released in Japan on December 10, 1998, through VAP.

== Background ==
"('Cause) I'm Your Girl" features rapping by Eric and Andy prior to their debut with Shinhwa. The music video remained one of the most requested ones on popular music shows of the time for 13 to 14 weeks. A Japanese version of the song was included in the 12 cm release of their Japanese debut single "Meguri Au Sekai", released on October 21, 1998. A remixed version of the song, featuring Japanese rapper Kreva (then a member of Kick the Can Crew) was released as part of a remix single on December 10.

In 2001, the song was included on SM Entertainment's greatest hits album, SM Best Album 2. The song was additionally included on S.E.S.'s 2003 Japanese compilation album of Korean songs, Beautiful Songs. In 2014, a remake music video featuring D.O. of Exo was released.

== Reception ==
17 years after its release, the song re-charted on the Gaon Digital Chart at number 25 in the chart issue dated December 28, 2014 – January 3, 2015. In a survey involving 30 experts and 2,000 people published by The Dong-A Ilbo in September 2016, "('Cause) I'm Your Girl" was voted the third best female idol song by music experts and the seventh best female idol song among the public in the past 20 years.

Music program awards
Program	Date	Ref.
MBC's Live Young Times	February 21, 1998	
MBC's Live Young Times	February 28, 1998	
SBS's Inkigayo	February 22, 1998	
SBS's Inkigayo	March 1, 1998	

== Legacy ==
In 2014, webzine Music Y included "('Cause) I'm Your Girl" in their list of 120 Best Korean Dance Tracks of All Time at number 45, with critic Hong Hyuk-soo noting the song's "melodic simplicity and completeness" as well as the "neat arrangement and chorus, well-ordered characters and choreography" having been passed down to future generations as a textbook girl group song. In Melon and Seoul Shinmun's 2021 ranking of the Top 100 K-pop Songs of All Time, "('Cause) I'm Your Girl" placed at number 17, where music expert Lee Kyu-tak wrote that it "occupies a very important part in the history of K-pop, both in terms of the impact it had on the music world at the time of its release and the influence it had on future generations." Lee commented that along with H.O.T's "Descent of Warriors" and "Candy" (1996), "this song marked the beginning of K-pop and an important turning point that put SM Entertainment, the agency, in its current position."

Critic lists and polls
Publisher	Year	List	Rank	Ref.
The Dong-A Ilbo	2016	Best female songs according to experts	3	
The Dong-A Ilbo	2016	Best female songs according to the public	7	
Melon	2021	Top 100 K-pop Songs of All Time	14	
Music Y	2014	120 Best Dance Tracks of All Time	45	
Mnet	2014	Legend 100 Songs	N/A	
Rolling Stone	2023	100 Greatest Songs in the History of Korean Pop Music	27	

== Track listing ==
Japanese remix single

1. "Meguri Au Sekai" (Miami DJ Mix) (めぐりあう世界)
2. "Believe in Love" (Jon Robinson Groove Mix)
3. "('Cause) I'm Your Girl" (Kreva Mix)
4. "Oh, My Love" (Cyber Soul Mix)

== Charts ==
=== Weekly charts ===
Japanese remix single
Chart (1998)	Peak position
Japan Singles Chart (Oricon)	82

Korean version
Chart (2015)	Peak position
South Korea (Gaon)	25

== Release history ==
Release history and formats for "('Cause) I'm Your Girl"
Region	Date	Version	Label
South Korea	November 1, 1997	Korean version	SM Entertainment
Japan	December 10, 1998	Japanese remix CD single	VAP
