= An Ordinary Day (song) =

2004 song by g.o.d

Single by g.o.d

from the album An Ordinary Day
- Language: Korean
- Released: December 9, 2004
- Genre: K-pop, R&B
- Length: 3:33
- Label: JYP, Seoul Records
- Composer: Kwon Tae-eun
- Lyricist: Park Jin-young

G.o.d singles chronology
"Letter" (2002)	"An Ordinary Day" (2004)	"The Reason Why Opposites Attract" (2004)

Music video
- "An Ordinary Day" on YouTube

"An Ordinary Day" (Korean: 보통날; RR: Botongnal) is a song performed by South Korean boy band g.o.d, released on December 9, 2004. It was the title track and promoted song of their eponymous sixth album, the first album released by the group since Yoon Kye-sang's departure.

== Overview ==
The song describes, from a first-person viewpoint, the process of forgetting a lover while going through the mundane and ordinary routines of life. The final rendition of the refrain features a duet of main vocalist Kim Tae-woo's singing parts and Danny Ahn's rapped narration. The JoongAng Ilbo described the song as "emotional" and compared its smooth harmonies to "spreading paint".

== Awards and nominations ==
"An Ordinary Day" won #1 on SBS's Inkigayo, Mnet's new music program M Countdown and MBC's Music Camp (the former incarnation of Show! Music Core) for a total of six awards. It topped the Music Box Chart, one of South Korea's earliest predecessor charts which tallied downloads from online music stores.

Awards and nominations
Year	Organization	Award	Result
2005	Golden Disc Awards	Main Prize (Bonsang)	Won
2005	Mnet Km Music Video Festival	Best Male Group	Nominated

== "Original Version" ==
"An Ordinary Day"

Song

from the album Chapter 8
- Released: July 8, 2014
- Length: 4:39
- Label: SidusHQ, CJ E&M
- Composer: Kwon Tae-eun
- Lyricist: Park Jin-young

Having reunited as a five-piece after a nine-year hiatus, the members chose to remake the song as it was the title track of their first album released as a quartet. The song was rearranged by original composer Kwon Tae-eun to include a part for Yoon Kye-sang after Kim Tae-woo's rendition of the chorus. In the track listing, the footnote original version is affixed to the song title to reference Yoon's return to the group, making g.o.d the original five-member group once again. The backing track was re-recorded and features an orchestra-based introduction and a much more prominent string section, in contrast to the simplistic groove of the original. In its review of Chapter 8, The Hankyoreh commented that the new arrangement was "lighter and more relaxed" than the original version and opined that it was perhaps the members' own subtle statement of contentment in being back together as a five-member group. Kim and Ahn's individual parts during the final rendition of the refrain were separated and performed separately rather than together as a duet.

Chapter 8 was released on July 8, 2014 and this version peaked at #19 on the Gaon Digital Chart. The rearranged version was first performed on July 12, the opening day of the group's 15th anniversary national tour. Since then, only this version has been performed at concerts.

== In popular culture ==
In 2005 the song was chosen as one of the default tunes installed in LG Cyon's 340 series cellular phones.

== Notable cover versions ==
Teen Top covered the song during the special stage segment of M Countdown on January 18, 2012 as a tribute to "An Ordinary Day" winning #1 on the show seven years ago.
