= List of number-one albums in South Korea (1998–2008) =

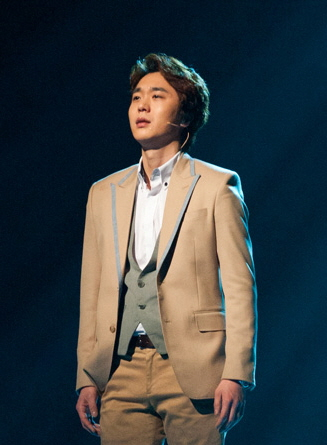
Six albums recorded by Jo Sung-mo topped the chart. For Your Soul, Classic and Let Me Love sold more than one million copies in one month. Furthermore, Let Me Love had the strongest sales in a month, with more than 1.7 million.

Between August 1998 and September 2008, the Music Industry Association of Korea (MIAK) published a monthly record chart, ranking the best-selling CDs and cassettes within South Korea. At least 100 albums and two singles have topped the chart during the course of its existence.

In early 1998, South Korea's National Tax Service decided that the music industry should be more transparent. The MIAK decided in a meeting held on July 23, 1998, that record sales should be tracked and released on a monthly basis. The record labels had to submit the sales of an album up to six months after its release. The data had to be submitted until the 7th of every month and was released by the MIAK on the 10th. It issued its first two sales reports on September 10, 1998. One listed the best-selling albums between March and August 1998, topped by Seo Taiji's self-titled debut studio album, which sold more than 1.1 million copies. On the other list, Uhm Jung-hwa's Invitation was ranked as the best-selling album of August 1998. It sold more than 187,000 copies.

== Number ones ==
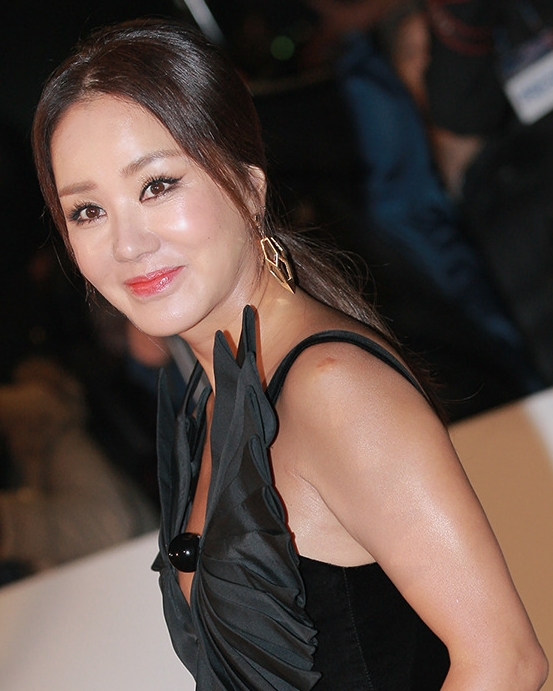
Uhm Jung-hwa's Invitation was the first album to top the chart. It sold 187,000 copies in August 1998.

Key
†	Indicates the best performing album of the year

Issue month	Album	Artist(s)	Sales	Ref.
August 1998	Invitation	Uhm Jung-hwa	187,131	
September 1998	Resurrection	H.O.T	611,750	
October 1998	Perfect Love	Turbo	367,535	
November 1998	Sea & Eugene & Shoo	S.E.S.	333,405	
December 1998	Sea & Eugene & Shoo	S.E.S.	135,199	
January 1999	Misery	Cool	195,017	
February 1999	A Seagull Of Dream	Kim Hyun-jung	243,470	
March 1999	Binding	Kim Min-jong	316,082	
April 1999	Now Or Never	Yoo Seung-jun	622,188	
May 1999	White	Fin.K.L	472,660	
June 1999	005.1999.06	Uhm Jung-hwa	325,093	
July 1999	Addio	Yangpa	275,412	
August 1999	Y.G. Best of Album	YG Family	265,410	
September 1999	For Your Soul	Jo Sung-mo	1,469,422	
October 1999	Love	S.E.S.	550,030	
November 1999	Growing	Kim Gun-mo	443,803	
December 1999	Over and Over	Yoo Seung-jun	455,363	
January 2000	Over and Over	Yoo Seung-jun	455,363	
February 2000	Classic	Jo Sung-mo	1,302,667	
March 2000	Desire To Fly High	Shin Seung-hun	415,533	
April 2000	Cool 5	Cool	270,195	
May 2000	Only One	Shinhwa	304,725	
June 2000	Only Love	Sumi Jo	134,852	
July 2000	Age of Peace: The Original Soundtrack	H.O.T	231,223	
August 2000	Coming of Age Ceremony	Park Ji-yoon	236,760	
September 2000	Let Me Love †	Jo Sung-mo	1,705,127	
October 2000	Outside Castle	H.O.T.	840,370	
November 2000	Chapter 3	g.o.d	1,147,752	
December 2000	A Letter from Greenland	S.E.S.	445,600	
January 2001	I Love You	Position	259,372	
February 2001	The More I Love You OST †	Various	550,661	
March 2001	The More I Love You OST †	Various	377,623	
April 2001	The More I Love You OST †	Various	181,154	
April 2001	Another Days	Kim Gun-mo	311,177	
May 2001	Another Days	Kim Gun-mo	311,177	
June 2001	Another Days	Kim Gun-mo	828,411	
July 2001	6ix	Cool	473,401	
August 2001	Polaris	Kangta	360,122	
September 2001	No More Love	Jo Sung-mo	979,697	
October 2001	Alone	Moon Hee-joon	315,320	
November 2001	Chapter 4	g.o.d	1,441,209	
December 2001	A Better Day	jtL	481,888	
January 2002	Shin Seung-hun Vol. 8	Shin Seung-hun	231,000	
February 2002	Choose My Life-U	S.E.S.	281,871	
March 2002	Perfect Man	Shinhwa	263,235	
April 2002	No. 1	BoA	230,626	
May 2002	No. 1	BoA	182,954	
June 2002	Summer Vacation in SMTown.com	SM Town	111,969	
July 2002	7even (Truth) †	Cool	532,594	
August 2002	Pine Tree	Kangta	245,158	
September 2002	My Stay In Sendai	Lee Soo-young	262,107	
October 2002	Sweet Dream	Jang Na-ra	326,901	
November 2002	Brown Eyes	Brown Eyes	340,984	
December 2002	Chapter 5: Letter	g.o.d	390,850	
January 2003	Second Whisper	Cool	105,322	
February 2003	Hestory †	Kim Gun-mo	171,130	
March 2003	A Singer	Jo Sung-mo	374,572	
April 2003	Hestory †	Kim Gun-mo	98,191	
May 2003	Atlantis Princess	BoA	127,887	
June 2003	Atlantis Princess	BoA	124,747	
July 2003	8ight	Cool	223,070	
August 2003	This Time	Lee Soo-young	172,246	
September 2003	It's Real	Wheesung	150,159	
October 2003	Soul Free	Brown Eyed Soul	126,007	
November 2003	Yoon Gun	Yoon Gun	82,690	
December 2003	3rd Story	Jang Na-ra	109,094	
January 2004	7th Issue †	Seo Taiji	342,273	
February 2004	Ninth Reply	Shin Seung-hun	185,003	
March 2004	Koyote 6	Koyote	96,915	
April 2004	Soul Tree	Park Hyo-shin	104,196	
May 2004	Koyote 6	Koyote	52,969	
June 2004	My Name	BoA	108,580	
July 2004	Must Listen	Seven	91,447	
August 2004	The Live Long Day	Lee Seung-chul	116,973	
September 2004	The Colors of My Life	Lee Soo-young	221,116	
October 2004	Tri-Angle	TVXQ	166,345	
November 2004	Brand New	Shinhwa	151,683	
December 2004	An Ordinary Day	g.o.d	140,691	
January 2005	Back to the Soul Flight	Naul	58,514	
February 2005	Ucupracacia	Tei	57,262	
March 2005	Effect	Buzz	79,606	
April 2005	Saldaga †	SG Wannabe	129,801	
May 2005	Saldaga †	SG Wannabe	93,162	
June 2005	This Is Me	Kim Jong-kook	62,843	
July 2005	Forever	Cool	47,661	
August 2005	This Is Me	Kim Jong-kook	38,305	
September 2005	Rising Sun	TVXQ	127,668	
October 2005	Into the Sky	g.o.d	63,411	
November 2005	Classic 1+1 Grand Featuring	Jo Sung-mo	38,658	
December 2005	"Show Me Your Love"	TVXQ & Super Junior	49,945	
January 2006	Grace	Lee Soo-young	73,289	
February 2006	Grace	Lee Soo-young	90,596	
March 2006	24/Seven	Seven	51,827	
April 2006	The 3rd Masterpiece	SG Wannabe	151,082	
May 2006	The 3rd Masterpiece	SG Wannabe	53,147	
June 2006	U	Super Junior	36,516	
July 2006	My Friend	SG Wannabe	23,747	
August 2006	State of the Art	Shinhwa	40,440	
September 2006	"O"-Jung.Ban.Hap. †	TVXQ	120,505	
October 2006	Rain's World	Rain	71,214	
November 2006	"O"-Jung.Ban.Hap. †	TVXQ	144,535	
December 2006	2006 Winter SMTown – Snow Dream	SM Town	33,453	
January 2007	Remapping the Human Soul	Epik High	47,909	
February 2007	Remapping the Human Soul	Epik High	50,586	
March 2007	"Toc Toc Toc"	Lee Hyori	27,845	
April 2007	The Sentimental Chord †	SG Wannabe	80,832	
May 2007	The Sentimental Chord †	SG Wannabe	44,618	
June 2007	Love Child of the Century	Clazziquai Project	23,326	
July 2007	No Limitations	Fly to the Sky	32,334	
August 2007	The Beginning, New Days	Shin Hye-sung	50,182	
September 2007	Don't Don	Super Junior	66,878	
October 2007	Eru Returns	Eru	30,978	
November 2007	Don't Don	Super Junior	78,749	
December 2007	Thank You	Toy	35,624	
January 2008	Monologue	Kim Dong-ryul	41,470	
February 2008	Monologue	Kim Dong-ryul	20,697	
March 2008	Baby Baby	Girls' Generation	28,847	
April 2008	Volume 9	Shinhwa	96,320	
May 2008	Hot	Taeyang	31,285	
June 2008	Two Things Needed for the Same Purpose and 5 Objects	Brown Eyes	64,911	
July 2008	It's Hyorish	Lee Hyori	45,267	
August 2008	Stand Up	Big Bang	107,043	
September 2008	Mirotic	TVXQ	307,974	

== See also ==
- Gaon Music Chart
- Gaon Album Chart
