= I'm Your Girl (album) =

Studio album by S.E.S.
- Released: November 23, 1997
- Recorded: 1997
- Studio: SM Digital Recording Studio (Seoul)
- Genres: K-pop; dance-pop
- Length: 40:14
- Language: Korean
- Labels: SM; King; Synnara
- Producers: Yoo Young-jin; Choi Su-jeong (Moonstone); Kim Yu-ra; Lee Heung-yeol

S.E.S. chronology
I'm Your Girl (1997)	Sea & Eugene & Shoo (1998)

Singles from Sea & Eugene & Shoo
- 1. "('Cause) I'm Your Girl" Released: November 1, 1997; 2. "Oh, My Love" Released: March 1998

Alternative cover
- Taiwanese deluxe edition cover

I'm Your Girl is the debut studio album by South Korean girl group S.E.S., released by SM Entertainment on November 1, 1997. It spawned two singles: "('Cause) I'm Your Girl", which was promoted shortly after the release of the album, and "Oh, My Love", which was released in March 1998. Commercially, I'm Your Girl sold approximately 650,000 copies.

== Background ==
S.E.S. is one of South Korea's first generation K-pop idol groups. Under SM Entertainment's management, it was produced wholly by Lee Soo-man. Its original release was on King Records with subsequent releases by Synnara Records.

== Release and promotion ==
The lead single, title track "('Cause) I'm Your Girl" features rapping by Eric Mun and Andy Lee prior to their debut with Shinhwa. The music video remained one of the most requested ones on popular music shows for 13 to 14 weeks. It collected four music show wins on MBC's Live Young Times and SBS's Inkigayo.

In 2001, "('Cause) I'm Your Girl" was included on SM Entertainment's compilation album, SM Best Album 2. It was also included on their 2003 Japanese release of Korean songs, Beautiful Songs. A remixed version, featuring Japanese rapper Kreva, then a member of Kick the Can Crew, was included on the group's second single in Japan. A second single, "Oh, My Love", was released in March 1998. It achieved the top spot on Inkigayo on April 12, 1998.

== Reception ==
The album sold steadily over time. In total, it sold approximately 650,000 physical copies. According to MTV Korea, "I'm Your Girl" "quickly became the Korean schoolgirl anthem, and remains a staple song for young girls in love." It has been performed on television by modern idol groups such as Girls' Generation and T-ara, and a parody version of its music video was created by boy group Exo.

== Accolades ==
Music program awards
Song	Program	Date	Ref.
"I'm Your Girl"	Live Young Times	February 21, 1998	
"I'm Your Girl"	Live Young Times	February 28, 1998	
"I'm Your Girl"	Inkigayo	February 22, 1998	
"I'm Your Girl"	Inkigayo	February 28, 1998	
"Oh My Love"	Inkigayo	April 12, 1998	

== Track listing ==
I'm Your Girl track listing
No.	Title	Lyrics	Music	Arrangement	Length
1.	"('Cause) I'm Your Girl"	Yoo Young-jin	Yoo Young-jin	Yoo	3:41
2.	"Oh, My Love"	Choi Su-jeong (Moonstone)	Choi	Choi	3:28
3.	"Nonsense"	Kim Yu-ra	Kim Yu-ra	Lee Heung-yeol	3:51
4.	"Deja-vu" (데자부)	Kim Yu-ra	Kim Yu-ra	Lee Heung-yeol	3:40
5.	"Good-bye"	Kim Yu-ra	Kim Yu-ra	Lee Heung-yeol	3:58
6.	"Reason Why I'm Perfect" (완전한 이유)	Yoo	Yoo	Yoo	4:30
7.	"Friend" (친구)	Choi	Choi	Choi	4:29
8.	"Rock'n Country" (Rock'n 나라)	Choi	Choi	Choi	3:48
9.	"After Today" (오늘이 지나면)	Kim Yu-ra	Kim Yu-ra	Lee Heung-yeol	4:24
10.	"Thy Fragrance" (그대의 향기)	Lee Soo-man	Kim Seong-su	Yoo	4:25
Total length:					40:14

I'm Your Girl – Taiwanese deluxe edition
No.	Title	Length
1.	"Oh, My Love"	3:28
2.	"Dreams Come True"	4:02
3.	"Kiss"	4:14
4.	"Friend" (朋友; Péngyǒu)	4:29
5.	"Shy Boy"	3:38
6.	"I'm Your Girl"	3:41
7.	"Eternal Love"	3:31
8.	"Feeling" (感覺; Gǎnjué)	3:44
9.	"After Today" (過了今天; Guòle Jīntiān)	4:24
10.	"Reason Why I'm Perfect" (完全的理由; Wánquán de Lǐyóu)	4:30
Total length:		39:41

=== Notes ===
- "('Cause) I'm Your Girl" features uncredited rap vocals from Andy Lee and Eric Mun.
- "Thy Fragrance" features Eric Mun despite no credit given, and is a remake of the 1995 song with the same title by Yoo Young-jin.

== Credits and personnel ==
S.E.S.

- Bada – vocals
- Eugene – vocals
- Shoo – vocals

Recording

- Recorded at SM Digital Recording Studio, Seongdong-gu, Seoul

Staff and personnel

- SM Entertainment – executive producer
- Lee Soo-man – executive producer
- KAT – recording
- Younghoon Kim – recording
- Yoo Young-jin – chorus, rap
- Kang Cheol-won, Kang Hee-jeong, Kim Gyeong- wook, Kim Do-gyun, Oh Jung-seok, Yoo Seong-sik, Yoon Hyun-jeong, Jeong Chang-hwan – production coordinators
- Taeyoon Lee – bass
- Yura Kim – chorus
- Choi Su-jeong (Moonstone) – chorus
- Andy Lee, Eric Mun, Lee Min-woo, Shin Hye-sung – rap
- Kim Seong-hoon, Park Sang-jun, Ha Dae-hwan – rap
- Hyojin Jo – graphic design
- Kim Seong-su – guitar
- Lee Heung-ryeol – guitar
- Haeik Jeong – manager
- Soohyun Kim – assistant manager
- Kang Bong-kwon – choreography
- Moon Hee-joon (H.O.T.) – choreography
- Park Jae-jun – choreography
- Go Young-jun – photography
- Kim Il-kwon – photography
- Go Gyeong-min – stylist
- Kim Seong-ae – stylist
- Kim In-young – stylist

== Sales ==
Chart	Amount
South Korea (MIAK)	650,000

== Charts ==
Chart (1999)	Peak position
Taiwanese International Albums (IFPI)	4

== Release history ==
Region	Release date	Edition	Format	Distributor
South Korea	November 1, 1997	Original edition	CD, cassette	SM Entertainment
Taiwan	February 5, 1999	Taiwanese deluxe edition	CD, cassette	Rock Records
Japan	2001	Japan edition	CD	Avex Trax
