= Beautiful Songs =

Compilation album by S.E.S.
- Released: June 25, 2003
- Genres: K-pop, dance
- Language: Korean
- Label: Avex Trax

S.E.S. chronology
Friend (2002)	Beautiful Songs (2003)	Remember (2017)

Beautiful Songs is a compilation album released in 2003 by first generation K-pop girl group S.E.S. This is S.E.S.' last album before officially disbanding. Although it comprises their Korean songs, the record was released only in Japan by their record label in the country, Avex Trax.

== Track listing ==
1. S.II.S (Soul To Soul)
2. Just A Feeling (Liquid Electro Mix)
3. Love
4. U
5. I Will...
6. Dreams Come True
7. I've Been Waiting For You
8. Melody
9. Snow X-Mas
10. Tell Me
11. Season In Love
12. Friend
13. Beautiful Life
14. Show Me Love
15. Love Game
16. ('Cause) I'm Your Girl
17. Running
18. BRAND NEW ★ WORLD
