= Choose My Life-U =

Studio album by S.E.S.
- Released: February 15, 2002
- Recorded: 2001–2002
- Studio: SM Digital Recording Studios (Seoul)
- Genre: K-pop; dance
- Length: 52:48
- Language: Korean
- Label: SM

S.E.S. chronology
| Surprise (2001) | Choose My Life-U (2002) | S.E.S. Best (2002) |

Alternative cover

Singles from Choose My Life-U
- 1. "U" Released: February 15, 2002; 2. "Just a Feeling (Remix version)" Released: February 15, 2002

Choose My Life-U is the fifth studio album by South Korean girl group S.E.S., released through SM Entertainment on February 15, 2002. The record spawned two singles—"U" and "Just A Feeling (Remix Version)". The album experienced success on the charts in South Korea, where it was the number-one album of February 2002 and sold over 400,000 copies by the end of the year.

== Background ==
Choose My Life-U marked a transformation into a more mature image for the group. Musically, the lead single "U" contains a mix of rock music, Eurodance, and Latin elements. Its music video features the members taking on various roles including Shoo as a casino dealer, Eugene as a designer, and Bada as a camera director.

== Commercial performance ==
Choose My Life-U recorded over 300,000 pre-orders prior to its release. On the album charts in South Korea, the album was the number-one best-selling record of February 2002 with sales of nearly 282,000 copies, and became the group's fourth consecutive monthly number-one album. It was the 11th best-selling album of 2002 with over 406,000 copies sold.

== Accolades ==
Awards
| Year | Organization | Category | Result | Ref. |
|---|---|---|---|---|
| 2002 | Mnet Music Video Festival | Best Female Group | Won | |

Music program awards for "U"
| Program | Date |
|---|---|
| Inkigayo | March 10, 2002 |
| Inkigayo | March 17, 2002 |
| Inkigayo | March 24, 2002 |
| Music Camp | March 23, 2002 |
| Music Camp | March 30, 2002 |

== Track listing ==
Choose My Life-U track listing
| No. | Title | Lyrics | Music | Arrangement | Length |
|---|---|---|---|---|---|
| 1. | "Just A Feeling (Original Version)" | Jeon Seung-woo | Kim Do-hoon | Kim Do-hoon | 3:48 |
| 2. | "You Told Me" | Kim Young-hoo | Kim Young-hoo | Kim Young-hoo | 3:28 |
| 3. | "U" | Hong Ji-yu | Nick Manic; Beauvais | Hwang Seong-je; Park Chang-hyun | 3:23 |
| 4. | "Friend-The Second Story" (친구-두번째 이야기) | Bae Hwa-young | Go Yeong-jo | Go Yeong-jo | 4:11 |
| 5. | "Choose My Life" | Yoon Hyo-sang; Lee So-eun | Hwang Seong-jae | Hwang Seong-jae | 3:32 |
| 6. | "Running" (달리기) | Park Chang-hak | Yoon Sang | Kang Ho-jung | 3:32 |
| 7. | "I Wish I Had a Husband" (나도 남편이 있었으면 좋겠다) | Bada | Hongseok | Hongseok | 3:47 |
| 8. | "Requiem" | Lee Dong-hyun | Lee Jun-ho | Lee Jun-ho | 3:56 |
| 9. | "Prayer" (기도) | Park Kyung-jin | Eunbi | Eunbi; Hong Jeong-soo | 4:31 |
| 10. | "Red Angel" | Lee Jun-ho | Lee Jun-ho | Lee Jun-ho | 3:34 |
| 11. | "Courage" (용기) | Sung Seok-won | Choi Seung-min | Choi Seung-min | 3:51 |
| 12. | "I Can't Forget" (잊지 못해) | Kwon Gim-yung | Kwon Gim-yung | Ahn Ik-soo | 3:32 |
| 13. | "To Me" (내게로) | Kim Young-hee | Park Se-jun | Fogansoo | 4:08 |
| 14. | "Just A Feeling (Remix Version)" | Jeon Seung-woo | Kim Do-hoon | Hwang Seong-jae | 3:35 |
| Total length: | | | | | 52:48 |

== Charts ==
=== Monthly charts ===
| Chart (2002) | Peak position |
|---|---|
| South Korean Albums (MIAK) | 1 |

=== Year-end charts ===
| Chart (2002) | Position |
|---|---|
| South Korean Albums (RIAK) | 11 |

== Sales ==
| Region | Certification | Certified units/sales |
|---|---|---|
| South Korea | — | 406,528 |
