= S.E.S. (group) =

South Korean girl group

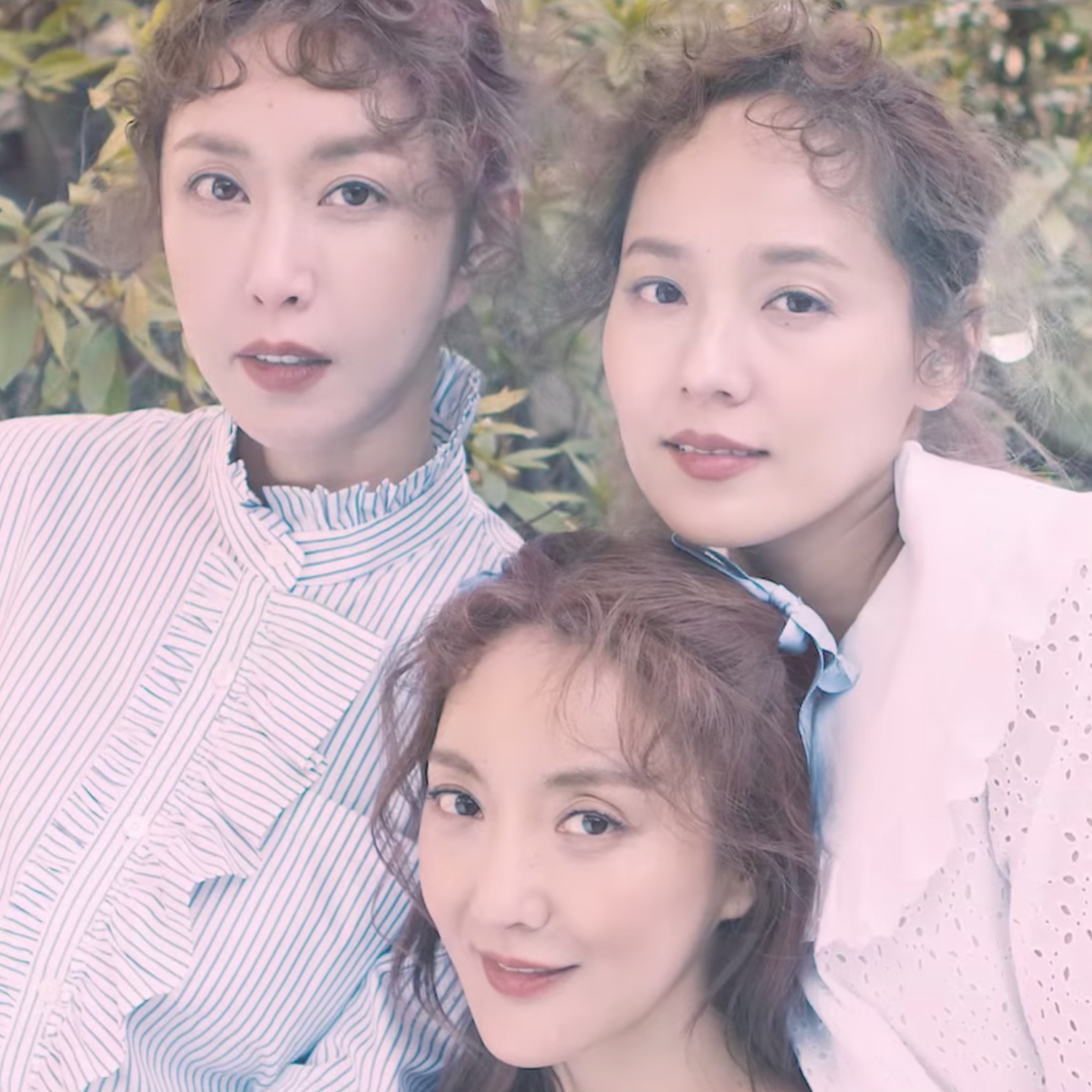
- S.E.S. for Marie Claire Korea in 2017

Background information
- Origin: Seoul, South Korea
- Genres: K-pop; dance-pop
- Years active: 1997–2002; 2016–2017
- Labels: SM; VAP; Avex Trax
- Formerly of: SM Town
- Members: Bada; Eugene; Shoo
- Website: ses.smtown.com

S.E.S. (Korean: 에스이에스; acronym for Sea, Eugene, Shoo) were a South Korean girl group formed in 1997 by SM Entertainment, featuring three members: Bada, Eugene, and Shoo. Their debut album I'm Your Girl sold 650,000 copies, becoming the third best-selling album by a female group in South Korea. Their follow-up albums, Sea & Eugene & Shoo in 1998, Love in 1999 and A Letter from Greenland in 2000 also became best-sellers.

Early in their career, they were dubbed as the female counterpart of their labelmates H.O.T., who debuted in 1996. The group officially disbanded in December 2002, after unsuccessful contract renewal negotiations with Bada and Eugene; Shoo maintained her career with SM until 2006. They released the compilation album Beautiful Songs in mid-2003 as their final release.

In October 2016, the group's members reunited in order to celebrate their debut's 20th anniversary with a reality show, album, and concert. In November 2016, the group released the buzz single "Love [story]" under SM's music project SM Station. Their 20th anniversary special album Remember was released on January 2, 2017, with the dual singles "Remember" and "Paradise".

Critic Kim Bong-hyun noted them as "the first idol group whose image and music are recognized". Critic Kang Myeong-seok highlighted how "('Cause) I'm Your Girl" captivated the public from the first verse, and noted tracks like "Love" and "Be Natural" as "legends of girl group songs".

== History ==
=== 1997–1998: I'm Your Girl, Sea & Eugene & Shoo, and Japanese debut ===
They released their first album, I'm Your Girl and had their public debut on November 28, 1997. Their image at the time was very innocent, with their discography consisting mostly of love songs. In much of their promotional work, including an appearance on Lee Sora's "Propose" show, they displayed their multiple abilities: Eugene demonstrated her piano playing, while Bada and Shoo sung together. Eventually, the singles "('Cause) I'm Your Girl" (which had future Shinhwa members Eric Mun and Andy Lee rapping in the introduction) and "Oh, My Love" became huge hits for S.E.S., and they quickly became one of the top-selling groups in K-pop.

Their second studio album, Sea & Eugene & Shoo, was released in November 1998. The album saw commercial success, selling over 650,000 copies. The single "Dreams Come True", a cover of Finnish group Nylon Beat's "Rakastuin mä looseriin" ("Like a Fool"), became a hit along with "I Love You". Both singles ranked at number one on the music program charts in South Korea for multiple weeks, including three consecutive weeks on Music Bank. The group won several awards for the album, including Top Popular Artist at the 1998 MBC Music Festival.

During the same year, S.E.S. made their debut in the Japanese market with the release of the single "Meguriau Sekai". It was released under VAP Records on October 21, 1998. It peaked at number 37 on the Oricon Singles Chart and sold over 13,000 copies. A remix version of "('Cause) I'm Your Girl" was released as the group's second single in Japan on December 10, 1998, and also contained remixes of "Meguriau Sekai", "Believe in Love", and "Oh, My Love".

=== 1999–2000: Love and A Letter from Greenland ===
S.E.S. released their debut Japanese studio album, Reach Out, under VAP Records on March 10, 1999. The album peaked at number 50 on the Oricon Albums Chart. On May 18, the group received an appreciation plaque from Rock Records for having sold over 200,000 copies in Taiwan. On October 29, 1999, their third album Love was released. It became the second best-selling Korean girl group album at the time, only behind The Pearl Sisters' My Dear (1968). The music video for the titular single, "Love", was filmed in New York City and cost ₩1 billion (US$800,000) to produce, making in one of the most expensive music videos produced in South Korea at the time. On December 13, 1999, S.E.S. received a commendation award from the Ministry of Culture, Sports and Tourism.

The band's dark concept was later dropped at the end of their promotional schedule, and all three members reverted to a simpler image; the dance for "Twilight Zone" was subsequently changed as well. Promotional activities resumed at the end of January 2000. On April 21, 2000, a Japanese version of "Love", titled "Love (Itsumademo Onje Kajima)", was released. However, it peaked at only number 100 on the Oricon Singles Chart. On March 19, 2000, S.E.S. held their first solo concert in support of Love at the Olympic Gymnastics Arena, titled A Sweet Kiss from the World of Dream. Tickets for the concert were sold-out with more than 9,000 people attending. A live DVD of the concert was released in June.

The group's second Japanese studio album, Be Ever Wonderful, was released on May 24, 2000. In December 2000, S.E.S.'s fourth Korean studio album, A Letter from Greenland was released. It was commercially successful and sold over 635,000 copies in South Korea. The album's lead single "Show Me Your Love", ranked atop the music program charts for multiple weeks. A cover of J-pop singer Misia's "Tsutsumi Komu Youni...", the song was a slow, ballad influenced by jazz. The second single, "Be Natural", was also promoted on music programs after promotions for "Show Me Your Love" ended.

=== 2001–2002: Surprise, Choose My Life-U, and Friend ===
On July 11, 2001, a special album was released (receiving the ".5" label). Titled Surprise, their 4.5th album was a collection of their songs released in Japanese re-recorded in Korean (with new instrumentals). It sold over 357,000 copies in South Korea during 2001. The lead single from the record, titled "Just in Love", was a Korean version of their Japanese single "Yume wo Kasanete" (1999) and brought S.E.S. back to a happy, poppy theme, although they avoided the cutesy images from their debut. The music video for "Just in Love" was filmed in Thailand. At the 2001 Mnet Music Video Festival, the song won S.E.S. the Best Female Group award.

Their major comeback album, Choose My Life-U, was released on February 15, 2002. This was a continuation of their sophisticated theme, with the album booklet full of suggestive pictures of the girls. Their first single "U" was quite different, being very dance-intensive; the video showed the girls in dominant roles and positions, with Eugene even becoming a dominatrix for one scene. This song also did well and returned S.E.S. to the top of the charts, and won S.E.S. Best Female Group at the 2002 Mnet Music Video Festival for the second year in a row. "Just a Feeling" was their second single from this album.

Their comeback album and second Korean compilation album, Friend, was released on November 21, 2002. The main single was titled "Soul II Soul (S.II.S.)", which was a play on words (as the number 2 can be pronounced as "E" in Korean). In the dark-themed music video, Bada is seen writing letters while crying, Eugene is cutting up bunnies in a room (suggesting mental instability), and Shoo is seen caressing a large ball of light on her bed. The song was never performed on television.

=== 2003–2015: Post-disbandment activities and reunions ===
After releasing the compilation album Beautiful Songs in June 2003, members followed solo careers in music and acting. In 2007, the group celebrate their 10th anniversary, and in 2008, they appeared as a group on the South Korean show Happy Sunday. In October 2009, they made another appearance together on the show Come To Play.

In 2014, their song "Be Natural" was remade by their labelmate girl group Red Velvet, which at the time consisted of 4 members. The track served as their second official single. Also in that year, members Bada and Shoo appeared as guests on the show Infinite Challenge, as a part of their 1990s-themed special Saturday, Saturday, I Am A Singer. At the occasion, Eugene was absent due to pregnancy and was represented by Girls' Generation member Seohyun.

=== 2016–2017: 20th anniversary project ===
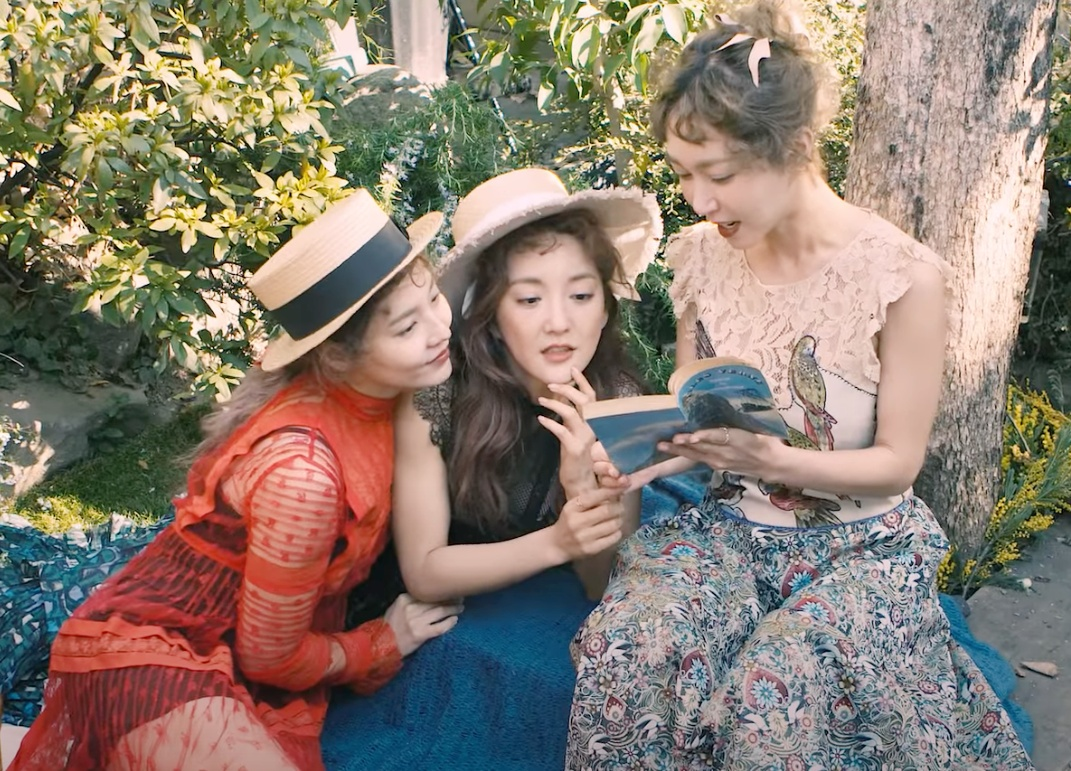
S.E.S for Marie Claire Korea, March 2017

On May 28, 2016, S.E.S attended the charity event Green Heart Bazaar. A few months later, on October, it was announced that S.E.S. would make an official comeback to the music scene in 2016, almost 20 years since the release of their debut album. On November 23, the group's schedule was revealed by their record label, with the official announcement of a special celebrative album. On November 23, the group's comeback project #Remember was revealed, detailing S.E.S.'s upcoming releases. On November 28, S.E.S. released the song "Love [story]", a remake of their 1997 song "I'm Your Girl" and 1999 song "Love", through the SM Station project. Its music video was released on December 29.

Starting from December 5, the group starred in the ten episode reality show Remember, I'm Your S.E.S., broadcast through mobile app Oksusu. They also held a two-day concert "Remember The Day", on December 30 and 31 at Sejong University's Daeyang Hall in Seoul. On December 17, 2016, S.E.S. performed on You Hee-yeol's Sketchbook.

On December 27, it was announced that S.E.S.'s new album would be titled Remember, and would contain two main singles. Two days later, previews for the music videos of main singles "Remember" and "Paradise" were released alongside the full music video of "Love [story]". The first single "Remember" was officially released prior to the album on January 1, with its music video; the second single "Paradise" was released on January 2, also with its music video, alongside the full album. On March 1, they held a fanmeet called "I Will Be There, Waiting For You".

== Discography ==
Korean albums

- I'm Your Girl (1997)
- Sea & Eugene & Shoo (1998)
- Love (1999)
- A Letter from Greenland (2000)
- Choose My Life-U (2002)
- Remember (2017)

Japanese albums

- Reach Out (1999)
- Be Ever Wonderful (2000)

== Concerts ==
- A Sweet Kiss from the World of Dream (2000)
- Remember, the Day (2016)

== Awards and nominations ==
List of awards and nominations received by S.E.S.
Award	Year	Category	Nominated work	Result	Ref.
Golden Disc Awards	1998	Rookie of the Year Award	I'm Your Girl	Won	
Golden Disc Awards	1999	Album Bonsang	Love	Won	
Golden Disc Awards	1999	Album Daesang	Love	Nominated	
Golden Disc Awards	2001	Popularity Award	"Show Me Your Love"	Won	
KBS Song Festival	1998	Main Prize (Bonsang)	S.E.S.	Won	
KBS Song Festival	2001	Main Prize (Bonsang)	S.E.S.	Won	
KMTV Music Awards	1998	Main Prize (Bonsang)	S.E.S.	Won	
KMTV Music Awards	1999	Main Prize (Bonsang)	S.E.S.	Won	
KMTV Music Awards	2001	Main Prize (Bonsang)	S.E.S.	Won	
Korea Best Dressed Awards	1999	Best Dressed Female Singer Award	S.E.S.	Won	
Korea Culture and Arts Awards	2000	Youth Popular Singer Award	S.E.S.	Won	
Korea Entertainment and Arts Awards	1999	Youth Singer Award – Female	S.E.S.	Won	
MAMA Awards	1999	Best Group	"I Love You"	Nominated	
MAMA Awards	2000	Best Female Group	"Twilight Zone"	Nominated	
MAMA Awards	2001	Best Female Group	"Just in Love"	Won	
MAMA Awards	2001	Best Dance Performance	"Just in Love"	Nominated	
MAMA Awards	2002	Best Female Group	"U"	Won	
MAMA Awards	2005	Mnet Producer's Choice Award	S.E.S.	Won	
MBC Music Festival	1998	Top Popular Artist	S.E.S.	Won	
MBC Top Ten Singers Festival	1999	Top Popular Artist	S.E.S.	Won	
MBC Top Ten Singers Festival	2001	Top Popular Artist	S.E.S.	Won	
SBS Gayo Daejeon	1998	Main Prize (Bonsang)	S.E.S.	Won	
Seoul Music Awards	1998	Main Prize (Bonsang)	S.E.S.	Won	
Seoul Music Awards	1998	Grand Prize (Daesang)	S.E.S.	Nominated	

=== Other honors ===
Lists of other honors received by S.E.S.
Organization	Year	Honor
Ministry of Culture, Sports and Tourism	1999	Commendation in Leading Celebrity Category
National Entertainment Artists' Union	2000	Appreciation Plaque
Korean Confederation of Trade Unions	2000	Appreciation Plaque
Suwon District Prosecutor's Office	2002	Youth Crime Eradication Plaque

=== Listicles ===
S.E.S. on select listicles
Publisher	Year	Listicle	Placement	Ref.
The Dong-a Ilbo	2016	Best female artists according to experts	4th	
Mnet	2013	Legend 100 Artists	80th	

== See also ==
- List of best-selling girl groups
