= IHQ discography =

This is the list of albums released under iHQ (SidusHQ). The list also includes albums released under its predecessor company EBM.

== 1999 ==
Released	Title	Artist	Format
January 26, 1999	Chapter 1	g.o.d	Studio album
November 25, 1999	Chapter 2	g.o.d	Studio album

== 2000–2009 ==
Released	Title	Artist	Format
November 3, 2000	Chapter 3	g.o.d	Studio album
February 12, 2001	Accident	Cha Tae-hyun	Studio album
November 15, 2001	Chapter 4	g.o.d	Studio album
January 1, 2002	Wild Gangster Hiphop: 21C New Dance Jin Young Vol. 4	Hyun Jin-young	Studio album
May 15, 2002	Story – Orange Girl	LUV	Studio album
December 27, 2002	Chapter 5: Letter	g.o.d	Studio album
May 1, 2003	The Book	Cha Tae-hyun	Studio album
March 27, 2006	Street Jazz In My Soul	Hyun Jin-young	Studio album
May 4, 2007	Paradise	Hyun Jin-young	Studio album
May 28, 2007	If It Were a Dream (꿈이었으면) (feat. Sweet Sorrow)	Danny Ahn	Digital single
March 18, 2008	Special Album	Moon Hee-joon	
June 18, 2009	Last Cry	Moon Hee-joon	EP

== 2010–2019 ==
Released	Title	Artist	Format
April 27, 2011 (KOR); June 13, 2012 (JPN)	Take a Deeper Look	Jay Park	EP
December 28, 2011	New Breed	Jay Park	EP
February 7, 2012	New Breed	Jay Park	Studio album
February 14, 2013	"2013 Appetizer"	Jay Park	Digital single
April 10, 2013	JOAH	Jay Park	Single album
June 21, 2013	Don't Mess With Me (까불지마)	2EYES	Single album
October 8, 2013	Shooting Star	2EYES	Single album
May 8, 2014	"The Lone Duckling"	g.o.d	Digital single
July 8, 2014	Chapter 8	g.o.d	Studio album
October 22, 2014	"Wind" (Chapter 8 reissue)	g.o.d	Digital single
August 26, 2015	3rd Single Album: PIPPI	2EYES	Single album
December 9, 2015	g.o.d Single Album: A Funny But Sad Day	g.o.d	Single album
June 20, 2017	You (너야)	Lim Seul-ong	Single album
November 27, 2017	"Sea of Love" (너의 바다)	Lim Seul-ong	Digital single
November 27, 2018	"Snowfall" (눈이 내린다)	g.o.d	Digital single
January 10, 2019	Then & Now	g.o.d	Studio album
