= YTN =

South Korean broadcasting company

YTN 와이티엔

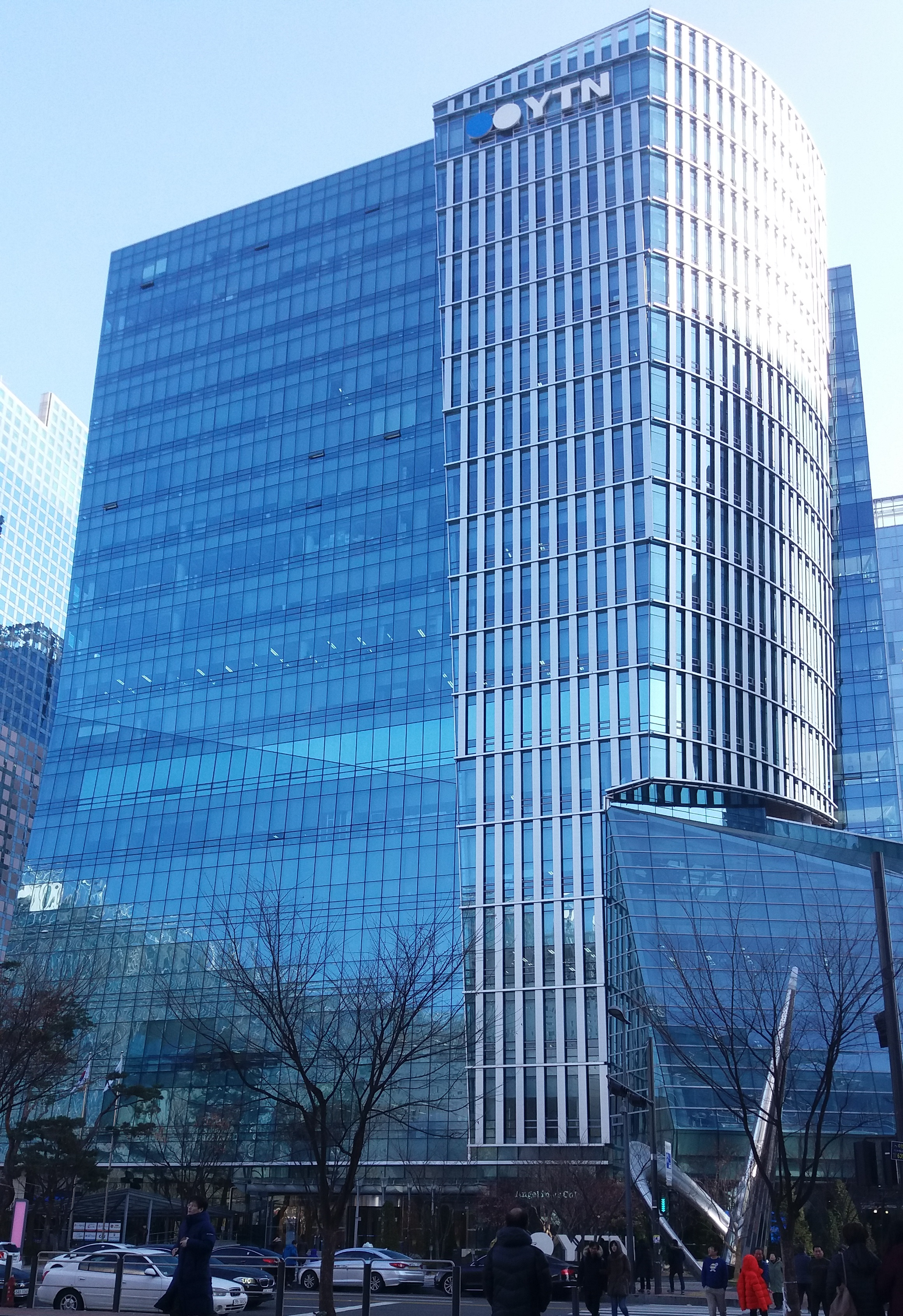
- The YTN NewSquare building, which is the company headquarters in Sangam-dong
- Country: South Korea
- Broadcast area: South Korea; Worldwide (via internet)
- Headquarters: Sejongno, Jung District, Seoul, South Korea

Programming
- Language: Korean
- Picture format: HDTV 1080i

Ownership
- Owner: Eugene Group
- Parent: Eugene Broadcasting Co., Ltd.
- Key people: Joo Yong-jung (CEO)

History
- Founded: September 14, 1993; 33 years ago
- Launched: March 1, 1995; 31 years ago

Links
- Website: www.ytn.co.kr

YTN
- Native name: 와이티엔
- Type: Private
- Founded: September 14, 1993; 33 years ago in Seoul, South Korea
- Headquarters: Sejongno, Jung District, Seoul, South Korea
- Area served: Worldwide
- Key people: Kim Min-bae (CEO); Bang Jung-oh (CEO); Bang Sang-hoon (Chairman)
- Revenue: ₩153,172,893,532 (2018)
- Operating income: ₩-1,036,465,441 (2018)
- Net income: ₩3,276,761,531 (2018)
- Total assets: ₩270,716,352,671 (2018)
- Total equity: ₩310,000,000,000 (2018)
- Owner: Eugene Group (20.0%); Too Capital, LLC (15.0%); Korean Air (9.68%); Booyoung Group (5.50%); Samhung (4.84%)
- Members: 289 (2018)
- Subsidiaries: Ilbo Media Rep; Ilbo Image Vision; Higround Co., Ltd.
- Website: www.ytn.co.kr

YTN (KRX: 040300) is the first 24-hour Korean news channel to be broadcast throughout South Korea. It was founded on September 14, 1993, and began broadcasting on March 1, 1995.

YTN originally stands for Yonhap Television News (Korean: 연합 텔레비전 뉴스; lit. 'United Television News'), as the channel was the subsidiary of Yonhap News Agency until its separation from the agency in 1998. The channel's previous slogans are "Yesterday, Tomorrow and Now" and "Your True Network", both of them being backronyms for the channel's name after the separation. The channel's three current slogans (since the 2014 rebrand) are "Always First", "Exclusive Tomorrow" and "Yes! Top News!". It also has the slogan, "Whenever and wherever there is news, we are there." In 2011, thirteen years after parting ways with YTN, the Yonhap News Agency started its own channel.

== History ==
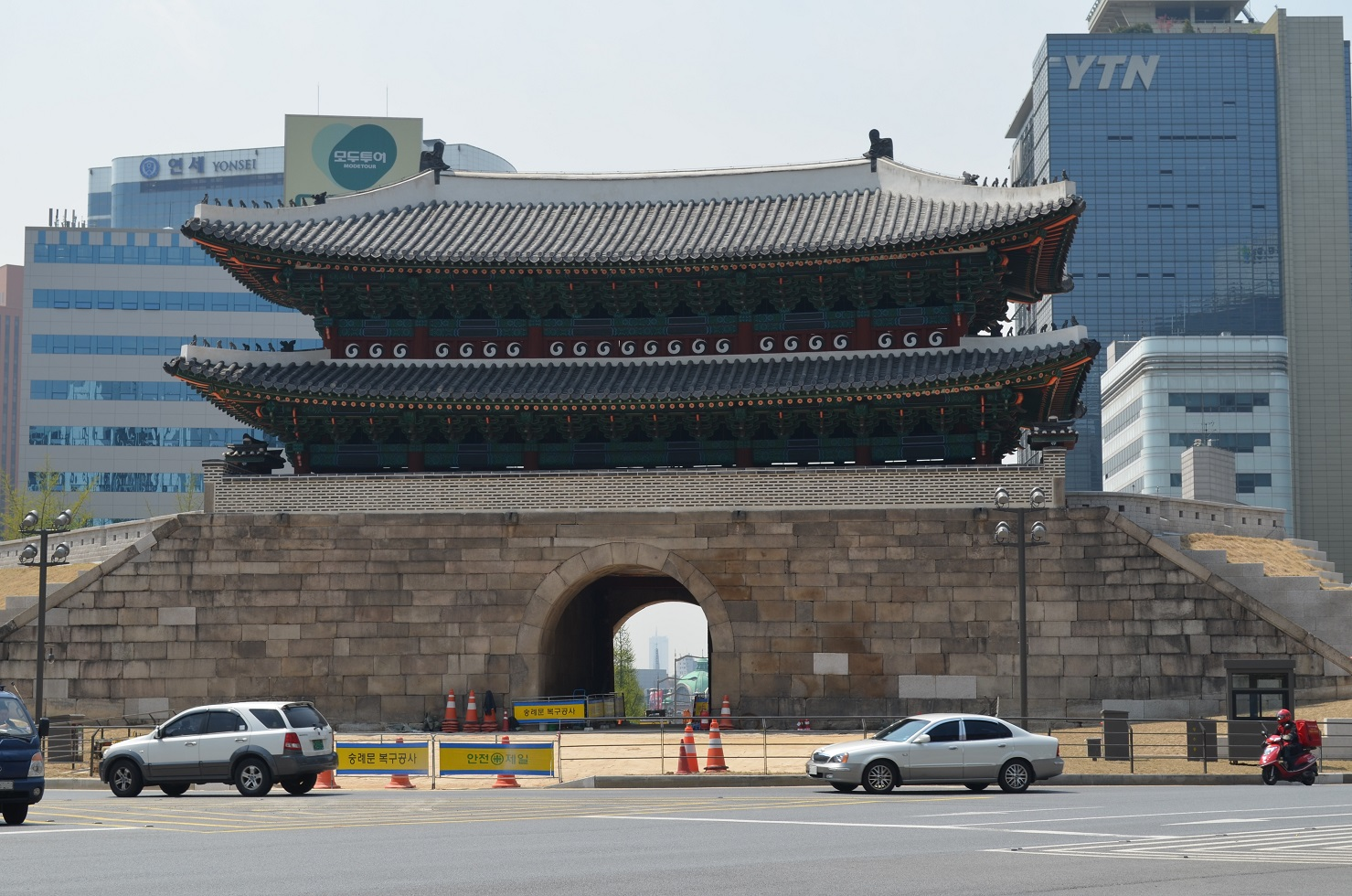
The original YTN tower (right background) with Namdaemun in the foreground, looking through open doors at the back of gate

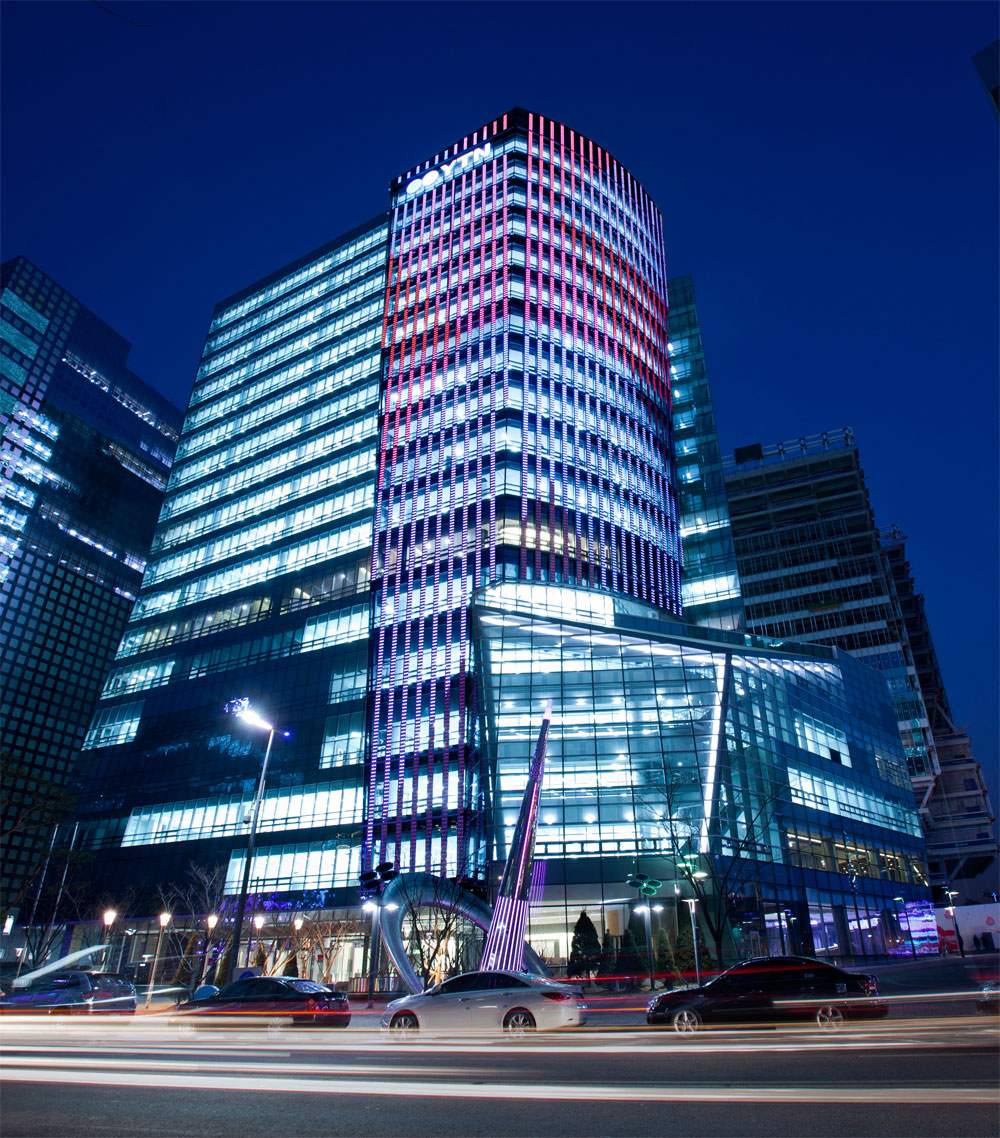
YTN NEWSQUARE at night time

The upcoming launch of cable television in Korea led to the founding of YTN on September 14, 1993.

In January 1995, Yonhap TV News planned to connect with its bureaus in South Korea, being one of the new channels that relied on live broadcasts. By being the first 24-hour news channel in the country, its channel number on cable was selected as 24 on purpose. YTN began test transmissions on February 15, on March 1, 1995, the same day as cable television started, YTN started regular broadcasts. It was expected that YTN was set to establish itself as the "Korean CNN". News bulletins under the YTN 24 name were shown on the top of the hour and Channel 24 Spotlight aired at 9pm to avoid competition with KBS News 9 and MBC Newsdesk as an in-depth analysis program. World 24 provided news footage from CNN, ABC, CBS, NHK, TBS, CCTV, CBC, BBC and the video wire services from Reuters and WTN. Asia, Asian provided Asian reports as covered by CCTV, NHK, TBS, TCS and Reuters' Asia Report. World News Magazine aired items from CBS's 60 Minutes, the syndicated Inside Edition and the BBC's Assignment. The channel also provided 48 weather reports a day, including specialized forecasts such as leisure and world weather. On March 7, it eyed a contract with CNN to provide live relays, but this still required government approval. In November 1995 alone, its advertising revenue reached 1.7 billion won.

On September 3, 1997, KEPCO agreed to buy 30% of YTN's shares for the sum of 23 billion won.

- 2000/04/08 Merged with Seoul Tower, constructing an integrated broadcast transmission tower. The network bought the tower on December 16, 1999.
- 2004/03/01 Moved to YTN tower, next to Namdaemun (South Gate, commonly known as Sungnyemun)

On March 15, 2004, YTN made changes to the schedule in time for the spring season, adding more opinion-related programming and hiring staff who worked at other outlets. The network recruited MBC's Baek Ji-yeon, Pressian's CEO Park In-gyu and Kyung Hee University professor Kim Min-jeon. In tandem with these changes, YTN International (YTN 인터내셔널) started broadcasting on March 18, 2004, as an international channel aimed at Koreans abroad, with three hours of original programming.

Broadcasts to the United States started in April 2006 when DirecTV started carrying the KoreanDirect package. The launch coincided with the arrival of CTS and MBC America to the platform.

- 2008/01/31 KCC approved YTN FM Radio.
- 2008/04/01 YTN FM Radio began broadcasting in Seoul city
  - (Callsign:HLQV-FM Frequency:FM 94.5 MHz.)
- 2011/04 Renamed from "YTN INTERNATIONAL" to "YTN WORLD"

On April 7, 2014, the network moved to YTN Newsquare, DMC Area. In conjunction with this, YTN changed its logo for the first time in 19 years, as well as the new slogan, "Exclusive Tomorrow".

- 2017/11/16 YTN FM Radio ceased broadcasts on Los Angeles' 100.3 FM HD 2 in favour of the Educational Media Foundation's (EMF) Christian Rock feed, Air1 after the purchase of KSWD by EMF.

On May 20, 2021, YTN moved from channel 24 (same channel as the remaining operators) to channel 0 on satellite operator KT SkyLife, confusing subscribers. YTN justified the move in Viewers' Briefing as a measure to increase its participation on digital platforms.

YTN was privatized in 2024 with the Eugene Group being the main shareholder.

== Logo evolution ==
1993-1995 (pre-launch)

1995-2000

2000-2014

2014-present

== YTN services ==
- YTN: Korea's first all-news TV channel, carries up-to-the-minute news, weather, sports and traffic, as well as in-depth analysis. The live newscast can be seen 24 hours a day, but live magazines are only in between 4:30 and 1:00.
- YTN Science: The first Korean science channel, provides a wide range of science information.
- YTN2: This channel delivers weather forecasts as well as up-to-date information on disasters and tips for a healthy lifestyle. It broadcasts live 24 hours a day.
- YTN News FM: Korea's only all news radio station with the latest news, weather, traffic, plus some music. It broadcasts live 24 hours a day.
- YTN World: International broadcaster to spread various Korean news and content on culture, IT industry, and business across the world.
- YTN Korean: Korea's advanced overseas Koreans specialized broadcaster, dedicated to multinational exchanges via Internet.

== Programming ==
YTN programming consists of a mix of live news bulletins, live broadcasts from major breaking news, commentary panel programs and overnight replays.

YTN increased its all news programming offerings in 2017, with three new weekday shows: Midnight News (midnight – 1 am), Morning News (6 am – 8 am) and News Talk (11 am – 11:40 am).

Throughout most of the day, rolling news coverage is presented from one of two YTN's studios. From 7:30 pm to 8:15 pm (weekdays) and from 9:15 pm to 10 pm (weekends), commentary programs are broadcast. Most of these programs are presented by commentators discussing the general issues that Korea and the world are facing. On the evening part, along with updates, YTN also features main news of the day and expects tomorrow's headlines. Overnight, the channel carries a 20-minute news program presented live from the newsroom on the hour (3 am and 4 am: only 10 minutes long), along with replays of daytime magazines.

== Controversies ==
In 2001, YTN president Baek In-ho said that "President Kim Dae-jung is the second founder of YTN", causing a scandal within the staff of the network, and the union demanding his exit. Accusations have emerged that YTN received government support in order to sustain itself, with a 130 billion won capital increase; the network was accused of pro-government bias. The recent (2024) privatization of YTN has also been criticized.

During the aftermath of the sinking of MV Sewol, YTN was accused of manipulating photos.

On April 19, 2018, misinformation that the investigative authorities were seizing and searching the office of Gyeongsangnam- do governor candidate Kim Gyeong-soo of the Democratic Party of Korea was issued as breaking news, and the anchors even mentioned that the search and seizure was in progress. Such misinformation came out just before the declaration of running for office, which could be treated as interference with the election campaign. After this report, reporters camped in front of Congressman Kim Gyeong-soo's office from the morning.presumably postponing Kim Kyung-soo's declaration of running in Jinju City, Gyeongsangnam-do, and held a press conference as well as a declaration of running at the National Assembly building in Seoul the same afternoon. He interviewed a reporter from Shinho YTN, who was on strike, on TBS Radio. In addition, according to the Shinho reporter, he said that there was no in-house discipline for the misinformation that had continued since the end of March. According to the opinion of the Director of the Reporting Department, the production team leader sent a person to the office of Congressman Kim Kyung-soo to the remarks of the camera reporter at the National Assembly, but the door was locked and he did not answer the phone, instead replying that it was confiscated and searched. Eventually, the Election Broadcasting Deliberation Commission received a state sanction for this.

During the Kim-Trump summit in May 2018, a YTN reporter who was on a business trip to Singapore to cover negotiations for the North American summit was arrested by the Singapore police while illegally filming US military facilities in Singapore without permission. There was no disciplinary action against the reporter.

Early in the pandemic, YTN aired reports about Koreans at a quarantine camp in Da Nang on February 25 and 26, 2020. The network was accused by Vietnamese netizens of complaining from South Koreans about the measures imposed, as well as downplaying cultural differences between the two countries.

== See also ==
- YTN Group
- N Seoul Tower
- Yonhap
- Korean Central Television
- BBC World News
- CNN
