= Digital Media City =

- Central business district
- 디지털미디어시티
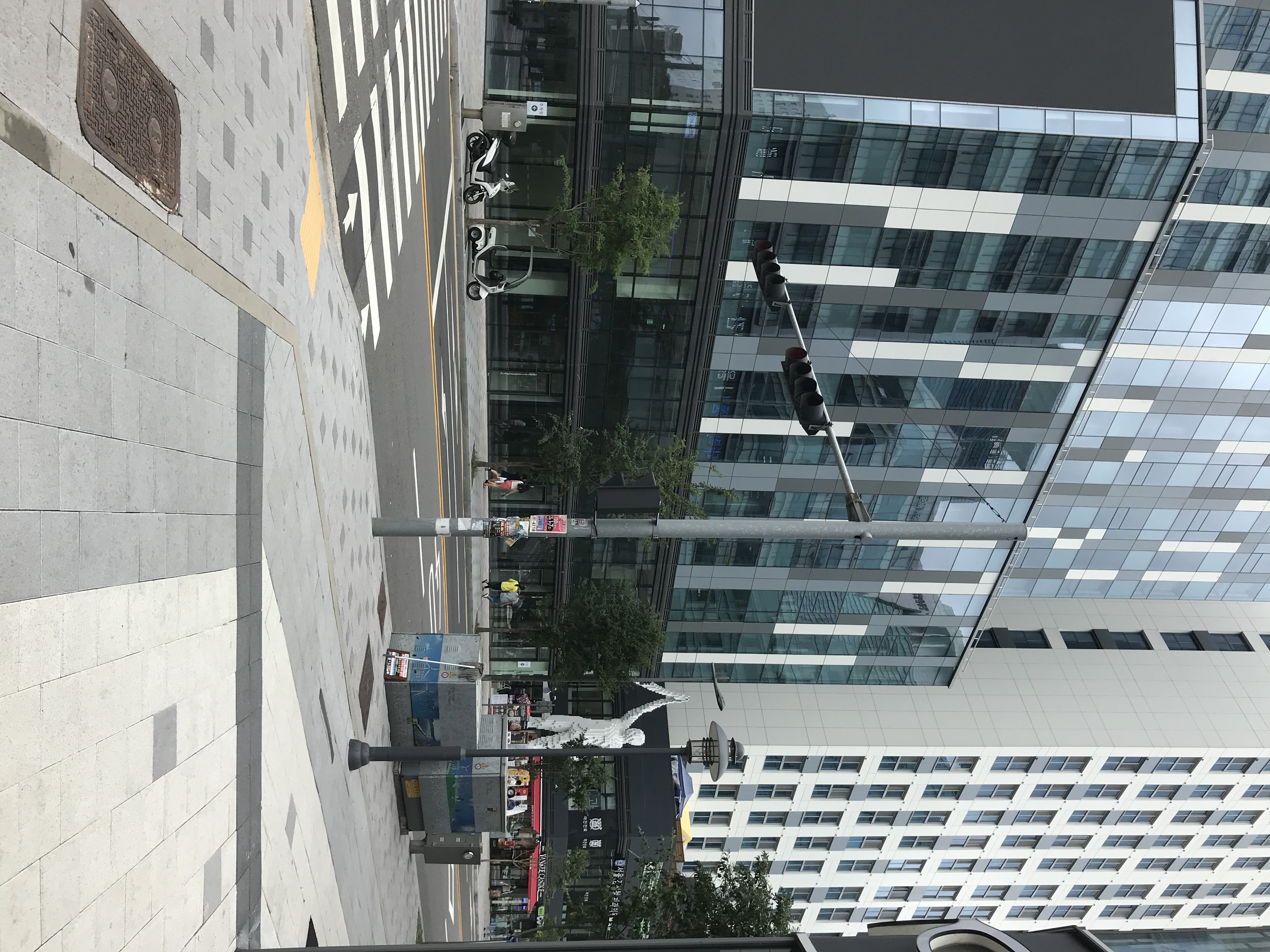
- Location within the Sangam-dong of Seoul
- Coordinates: 37°34′37.19″N 126°53′23.18″E
- Country: South Korea
- City: Seoul
- Gu: Mapo District
- Former District: Nanjido
- Planned: 2000
- Start of Construction: 2006
- Founded: 1997

Area
  - Total: 0.569925 km^{2} (0.220049 sq mi)
  - Commercial Use: 0.335134 km^{2} (0.129396 sq mi)
  - Public Facilities: 0.234791 km^{2} (0.090653 sq mi)
- Time zone: UTC+9 (Korean Standard Time)
- Website: seouldmc.kr/index.do

Digital Media City (DMC; Korean: 디지털미디어시티) is a high-tech complex for digital technologies, housing ubiquitous networked offices, apartments, exhibitions, conference halls, television network headquarters and cultural centers in Seoul, South Korea. It is located at 366, Worldcupbuk-ro, Mapo District, Seoul. It was constructed in 2006 across 570,000 m^{2} (6,100,000 sq ft) and approximately 1.7 times the size of the Canary Wharf development in London, United Kingdom. It is a high-tech city centered on Digital Media Street for broadcasting, movies, games, music, e-learning and related industries. It attracted well-known IT companies such as LG Telecom, Pantech, LG CNS and Samsung SDS, media companies like MBC, JTBC, YTN, SBS, as well as various kinds of public exhibition facilities including the Korean Film Archive and the Korean Film Museum.

Residents of the Digital Media City are nicknamed Denizens (Digital Citizen) for their constant enthusiasm and interaction with high-tech digital technologies.

The original advisors on the development include Dennis Frenchman and Michael Joroff of the Massachusetts Institute of Technology (MIT) who also advised on the development of MediaCityUK in Salford, Greater Manchester, England, and Digital Mile in Zaragoza, Spain.

== History ==
From 1978 to 1993, the currently developed area of the Digital Media City was in fact a massive landfill for Seoul's garbage on an island (at the time called Nanjido, now annexed into the mainland) in the Han River, before transforming into a high-tech modern city in the 21st century.

This dramatic turn-around is considered to be the result of the Miracle on the Han River, a term coined to describe Seoul's highly accelerated and successful development since the early 1960s. Used charcoal briquettes and other industrial waste materials produced during the city's rapid development in this period led to pile ups of trash. By the 1990s, these pile ups grew to mountains at a height of 95 metres (312 ft) and length of 2 kilometres (1.2 mi), even after being compressed into a rectangular shape that weighed over 120 million tonnes (120,000,000 long tons; 130,000,000 short tons). This was in comparison to Namsan, a natural mountain in Downtown Seoul, which is 262 metres (860 ft). Nanjido's accumulation of garbage increased to 3,000 truck loads of waste per day, essentially creating a pyramid 34 times larger than the Great Pyramid of Giza in Egypt.

In 1996, Seoul began to launch stabilization projects to withhold further industrial developments and build facilities to prevent the environmental contamination caused by the landfill zone. The stabilization projects included reinforcing the inclines of the landfill that were on the verge of collapsing, minimizing the sludge from the trash and collecting harmful gases. The gas accumulated in the process was utilized as the heat energy necessary for heating nearby facilities of the Seoul World Cup Stadium and the Sangam housing development area.

The re-engineered region was first designated a housing development zone in March 1997. A "New Seoul Town Development" project was announced when Goh Kun became the mayor of Seoul in July 1998. In August of the same year, the general planning for New Seoul Town project began to take form. Based on this, a master plan was established for the Millennium City (Sangam New Millennium Town). Along with drawing up a city plan to turn the Sangam region into a secondary center of Seoul, a subsequent plan was drafted to build a gateway town that embodies both information and ecology. The plan has since been carried out in concrete, and encompasses separate projects such as the World Cup Park, an environmentally friendly housing complex and the Digital Media City.

The Digital Media City is part of the larger Millennium City project in the Sangam-dong district of Seoul, 4 miles (7 km) from the central business district. Millennium City, conceived as a new town center, also encompasses the World Cup Soccer Park, a major transportation hub, and the restored Nanji-do landfill.

The project's initial funding from the Seoul Metropolitan Government is being used to leverage the involvement of private technology partners and developers. The project was planned by the metropolitan government with the assistance of the Seoul Development Institute (SDI), a public think tank established by the City of Seoul, and is being implemented by the development arm of the City government.

The Seoul Metropolitan Government provided the IT broadband and wireless networks that serve the area, constructed the infrastructure, and provided tax incentives and favorably-priced land for the most desirable tenants. These "magnet" tenants will attract other firms to the area, because of their business relationships or because their presence brands the area as a prestige location. The Korean national government has located several key IT and cultural agencies within the Digital Media City.

== Notable landmarks and buildings ==
The area is home to the filming studios and sets of most major broadcasting companies.

- CJ E&M Center (씨제이 이앤엠 센터) – broadcast and recording studio of many Mnet programs with a studio audience such as the live weekly music show M! Countdown
- Munhwa Broadcasting Corporation (MBC) (문화방송) – its journalism training center and its original studio is located in DMC while the newer and larger main studio is at the Dream Center in Goyang. Show! Music Core was formerly recorded at the DMC studio until it was moved to the newer Dream Center studio.
- Channel A – opened a second studio and office in DMC while the headquarters and original studio remain in Jongno District
- YTN
- Seoul Broadcasting System (SBS) – studios and headquarters housed in SBS Prism Tower
- jTBC – studios and headquarters

== Public transportation ==
It is served by the Digital Media City Station on Seoul Subway Line 6, AREX and Gyeongui Line.
