= YTN2 =

- Type: Cable television network
- Country: South Korea
- Headquarters: Sangam-dong, Mapo District, Seoul, South Korea

Programming
- Language: Korean
- Picture format: MPEG4 1080i

Ownership
- Owner: YTN Group (Eugene Group)
- Key people: Kim Baek (CEO)

History
- Launched: 1 July 2011; 14 years ago
- Former names: YTN Weather (2011–2015); YTN Weather & Life (2015–2016); YTN Life (2016–2021)

Links
- Website: www.ytn2.co.kr (in Korean)

YTN2 is a South Korean news and lifestyle television channel owned by the YTN Group. It started broadcasting on July 1, 2011, as YTN Weather and has diversified its programming since 2015.

== History ==
Weather forecasts have been a part of YTN since the channel's inception in 1995. On April 27, 2011, YTN announced that it had concluded the registration with the regulator for a dedicated YTN Weather channel, with its launch scheduled for July. The channel delivered national and international weather in real time, with a national bulletin every ten minutes, as well as theme forecasts related to leisure, wellbeing and daily life. The channel was the first such channel in Korea and was also used to prepare for climate disasters. The channel launched on July 1, but was facing difficulties at launch due to lack of technical manpower. YTN hired 20 people, including presenters and producers, before its launch, but did not hire additional technical staff.

On July 1, 2015, YTN renamed the channel as YTN Weather & Life, adding non-weather programming to its line-up. Among them was LIFE Mania, about Korean lifestyle trends, resorting to Instagrammers due to the rise of the platform in South Korea. In addition, YTN started providing a simulcast of the channel to the Incheon International Airport to provide weather data in case of delays and bad weather affecting air traffic.

The channel was renamed YTN Life on January 1, 2017, becoming a lifestyle channel, then to the current YTN2 on March 1, 2021.

== Programming ==
YTN2's programming consists primarily of human interest documentaries under the channel's current philosophy, reflected in its current slogan, "Life is News". Some of its productions, such as Newsmentary: War and People and Y2N, are also repeated on the main YTN channel.
