= Jung Da-eun =

South Korean actress (born 1994)

- Born: Jung Da-eun; 3 June 1994 (age 32); Seoul, South Korea
- Occupations: Actress; singer
- Years active: 2013–present
- Agent: Big Smile Entertainment
- Musical career
- Genre: K-pop
- Instrument: Vocals
- Years active: 2013–2018
- Label: SidusHQ
- Formerly of: 2Eyes

Jung Da-eun (born 3 June 1994) is a South Korean actress and singer, formerly of the K-pop girl group 2Eyes. She is best known for her roles in dramas Mystic Pop-up Bar, L.U.C.A.: The Beginning, Coffee, Do Me a Favor and Class of Lies. She also appeared in movies such as Derailed, Justice High and The Witch: Part 1. The Subversion.

== Filmography ==
=== Television series ===
Year	Title	Role	Ref.
2013	The Heirs	Herself	
2017	Single Wife	Da-eum	
2018	Coffee, Do Me a Favor	Jang So-myung	
2019	The Wind Blows	Lee Soo-in	
2019	Class of Lies	Jung Soo-ah / Yoo-sun	
2020	Mystic Pop-up Bar	Kang Yeo-rin	
2021	L.U.C.A.: The Beginning	Choi Yoo-na	
2021	Drama Special: "The Palace"	Princess Bong Sun	
2022	Never Give Up	Oh Seul-gi	
2022	Midnight Horror: Six Nights	Soo-in	
2022	Café Minamdang	Auntie Im	
2023	The Escape of the Seven	Song Ji-ah	
2023	Our Blooming Youth	Princess Ha-yeon	
2023	The Escape of the Seven	Song Ji-ah	
2024	The Escape of the Seven: Resurrection	Song Ji-ah	
2025	Shark: The Storm	Lee Yeon-jin	

=== Film ===
Year	Title	Role	Ref.
2016	Derailed	Ga-young	
2018	The Witch: Part 1. The Subversion	Long Haired girl	
2020	Justice High	Chae-young	
2020	Secret Garden (Independent Film)	Jung won's sister	
2023	Maybe We've Broken Up	Anna	
2023	Honey Sweet	Jin-ju	
