= YTN Group =

YTN Group is a multimedia group of YTN, producing media, broadcast and telecommunication products.

== Subsidiaries ==
- YTN
- YTN WORLD, YTN KOREAN (YTN's Satellite broadcasting service for outside South Korea)
- YTN SCIENCE (September 2007~)
- YTN2 (July 2011~)
- YTN DMB
- YTN RADIO
- YTN PLUS
- YTN Seoul Tower

=== Former ===
- CU Media (former YTN Media) (sold to iHQ Inc. in 2005)
  - AXN Korea
  - Comedy TV(Producing and Re-broadcasting Korean comedy programmes)
  - Y Star (Previously YTN Star)(Entertainment channel)

== See also ==
- Economy of South Korea
- List of South Korean companies
- Communications in South Korea

Yonhap is no longer included in YTN Group

== External group links ==
- YTN
- YonhapNews
- YonhapNewsTV newsy
- YTN DMB
- YTN PLUS
- YTN Seoul Tower
- YTN WORLD, YTN KOREAN
