= IHQ (company) =

South Korean company

iHQ, Inc. (DBA SidusHQ)
- Native name: 주식회사 아이에이치큐
- Formerly: EMB Production Co., Ltd.
- Type: Public
- Traded as: KRX: 003560
- Industry: Entertainment; Management
- Founded: 1997
- Founder: Teddy Hoon-tak Jung
- Headquarters: 4F, Sambo Building 88, Samseong 1-dong, Gangnam District, Seoul, South Korea
- Area served: Worldwide
- Key people: Teddy Hoon-tak Jung (Founder, Chairman and Stakeholder); Jeon Yong-joo (President and CEO)
- Services: Talent agency
- Owner: D'Live Co. Ltd. (56.73%); Kolon Industries Inc. (5.33%); A&E Television Networks Korea Ltd. (5.00%)
- Parent: Sidus Pictures (2000–2002); D'Live Co. Ltd. (2015–present)
- Subsidiaries: iFilm; Wisepeer Inc. iHQ Production
- Website: https://ihq.co.kr/ent/company/about-us/

iHQ Inc., doing business as SidusHQ (Korean: 싸이더스HQ; RR: SsaideoseuHQ) is a talent management agency based in South Korea. It was founded in January 2001 by Teddy Hoon-tak Jung. The company is involved in talent management and TV drama/music production.

== History ==
iHQ, or SidusHQ, is the successor of EBM, an entertainment company founded by producer Teddy Hoon-tak Jung (ko) in 1997. In 2000, EBM merged with production company Uno Films to become a new entertainment company, Sidus. At this time, Sidus was known as the management company of popular K-pop group g.o.d (as part of a cooperation with music producer and songwriter Park Jin-young of JYP Entertainment) and rising young actors and actresses such as Jang Hyuk, Cha Tae-hyun and Jun Ji-hyun. By 2002, the production and talent management divisions had separated; the production division is now known as Sidus Pictures while the talent management division became iHQ (also known as SidusHQ).

In 2004, SKT Corporation and Sidus HQ have collaborated to create a mobile drama called 'Five Stars'. On the 25th, the protagonists of the mobile drama 'Five Stars' were revealed through SK Telecom's June. The five male protagonists of 'Five Stars' consist of four newcomers discovered by Sidus HQ and one individual selected by netizens who visited a specific website between July 10 and 25. Set at a rural school, The drama, set to release in early October, features Gong Hyo-jin as the female lead. The characters included the rebellious Si-wool (Yoo Ha-jun), the cheerful playboy Jae-gwang (Jung Kyung-ho), the tough guy Jin-woo (Kim Hyung-min), the romantic Da-hyun (Jung Gyu-woon), and the adorable Ha-ru (Park Ki-young). The ending was decided by fan votes, in line with the nature of a mobile drama.

'Five Stars' was pioneer of an actor group, aiming to act together while pursuing individual activities. Except for Jung Kyung-ho, recruited from KBS talent, the others, mostly models, had limited acting experience. Despite being like unpolished diamonds, their tall and slim figures showcased promising potential. The drama consisted of seven episodes but received significant effort, comparable to a movie. They underwent three months of intense training at the Seoul Action School for action scenes. Appearances were made by several senior stars from Sidus HQ, such as Bin, Jang Hyuk, Ji Jin-hee, and Kim Sun-a, as well as cameo appearances, including Kim Soo-ro, Yeom Jeong-ah, Kim Sung-soo, and Gong Yoo. The OST, composed by Danny Ahn from god, premiered on a music cable channel in mid-September.

In 2005, iHQ acquired YTN Group's cable TV broadcasting division (YTN Media), and changed its name to present-day CU Media. It expanded into China, opening an office in Beijing in partnership with SK Telecom China in 2007. The branch serves to promote the activities of Korean stars in the Chinese market.

In 2010, Sidus regained ownership of the company that had previously been acquired by SK Telecom in 2005 by repaying the money. This decision was influenced by the contrasting perspectives and emotions about their respective businesses held by the two companies. Concurrently, the Sidus family embarked on a path of self-sufficiency. As the market environment demanded changes, smaller, family-oriented management businesses started to emerge. Former managers took the initiative to establish their own independent management companies, namely King Kong Entertainment, Fantagio, Management Soop, and Blossom Entertainment. The Sidus family's spin-off not only created an additional growth engine but also established a collaborative system.

In 2011, SidusHQ stars are attracting attention by producing a 'Love Sharing Hanbok Calendar' to practice warm love for neighbors.

In 2013, iHQ acquired 60% of shares in Wisepeer Inc., owner of the music site monkey3. It also became the biggest share holder (50.01%) in Cube Entertainment. At the same time, CU Media was sold to C&M.

In July 2018, it re-acquired New Able Entertainment. It had previously been spun-off as an independent subsidiary company and was home to the likes of Park So-hyun, Lee Yoo-jin and Danny Ahn. All artists on its roster were transferred to SidusHQ.

On June 23, 2022, IHQ Entertainment announced they acquired 47.14% of Maroo Entertainment.

== Current artists ==
=== Actors ===
- Choi Young-min
- Kim Dong-hyun
- Yang Hak-jin
- Ji Eun-sung
- Jung Soo-kyo
- Kim Han-jong
- Kim Young-jae
- Oh Kwang-rok
- Park Gun-woo
- Lee Byunghun
- Park Hyun-woo
- Ryu Dam
- Son Jun-ho (2015–present)
- Yoon Joo-bin
- Park Ki-woong

=== Actresses ===
- Choi Soo-jung
- Cho Ah-young (2017–present)
- Han Ga-rim (2018–present)
- Hwang Sun-hee (2022–present)
- Seo Hye-lin (2020–present)
- Jung Da-eun (2EYES)
- Kim Da-ye
- Lee Chae-young (2018–present)
- Lee Ga-won (2EYES)
- Lee Go-eun
- Lee Lu-da
- Lee Yoo-jin
- Lim Ju-eun (2022–present)
- Oh Ah-rin
- Park Se-hui (2020–present)
- Song Chae-yoon
- Yeon Ji-hoo

=== Entertainers ===
- Hwang Je-sung
- Joon Park (g.o.d)
- Lee Bong-won

=== Musicians ===
==== Groups ====
- g.o.d (1999–2003, 2014–present)
- Monogram
  - Kevin
  - Lee-won

==== Soloists ====
- Bigman
- The Nod
- Seo Hye-lin

== Former artists ==
- 2EYES
- Baek Sung-hyun (2011–2021)
- Chae Rim (2009–?, 2016–2018)
- Cha Hyun-jung
- Cha Tae-hyun (1999–2012)
- Cho Hyoung-ki
- Choi Ah-ra
- Choi Ji-woo (1994–2009)
- Choi Seung-hun
- Daniel Dae Kim
- Danny Ahn (g.o.d)
- Da-som (2EYES)
- Gong Hyo-jin
- Gong Yoo
- Han Eun-jung (?–2016)
- Han Go-eun (2006–2008)
- Han Jae-suk
- Han Ye-seul
- Heo Ji-won
- Hong Hyun-hee
- Hwang Ha-na
- Hwang Jung-eum (2012–2013)
- Hye-rin (2EYES)
- Hyun Woo (2008–2015)
- Hyun Jin-young
- Im Hyung-joon
- Im Soo-jung (?–2011)
- Jang Hyuk (1997–2024)
- Jang Kyoung-up
- Jason
- Jay Park (2010–2016)
- Ji Jin-hee (1999–2009)
- Jo Bo-ah (2012–2021)
- Zo In-sung (1998-2012)
- Jun Ji-hyun (1997–2010)
- Jeon Do-yeon (2000–2009)
- Jung Chan-min
- Jung Woo-sung (2000–2009)
- Jung Joo-yeon
- Jung Sun-yeon (2009–2014)
- Kim Bo-ra (1995–2019)
- Kim Ha-neul (2018–2021)
- Kim Hye-soo (2000–2009)
- Kim Hye-yoon (2019–2024)
- Kim Jung-hwa (2005-2007)
- Kim Ji-young (2014–2021)
- Kim Min-ji (2008–2011)
- Kim Sa-rang (?–2014)
- Kim Shin-young
- Kim So-hyun (2010–2017)
- Kim Sook
- Kim Su-jung
- Kim Soo-ro (?–2012)
- Kim Sun-a
- Kim Sung-soo
- Kim Tae-woo (g.o.d)
- Kim Woo-bin (2012–2020)
- Kim Yeon-jun (2EYES)
- Kim You-jung (2010–2020)
- Kim Yoon-hye (2019-2022)
- Ko Eun-mi
- Kwon Young-min
- Lee Jong-hyuk
- Lee Mi-sook (2013-2022)
- Lee Sang-yeob (2007–2014)
- Lee Soo-hyuk (2010–2014)
- Lee Yu-bi (2012–2017)
- Lee Seung-ha
- Lee Young-suk
- Lim Seul-ong (2015–2018)
- LUV (2002–2003)
- Moon Hee-joon (2007–2015)
- Nam Gyu-ri (2014–2018)
- Oh Jae-moo
- Oh Ji-eun
- Oh Yeon-seo (2019–2021)
- Park Bo-gum (2011)
- Park Eun-ji
- Park Hee-von (2013–2018)
- Park Mi-sun (?–2014)
- Park Min-young (2006–2010)
- Park Sang-nam
- Park Shin-yang
- Park So-hyun (2018–2021)
- Park Solomon (2020–2021)
- Park Soo-jin
- Park Sun-ho (2014–2022)
- Park Tae-joon
- Ryu Seung-soo (2018–2021)
- Seo Shin-ae (2004–2016)
- Shim Yi-young (?–2014)
- Shin Min-a (2004-2006)
- Solbi
- Son Ho-young (g.o.d)
- Song Hye-kyo (2005–2006)
- Song Joong-ki (2008–2012)
- Sunwoo Sun
- Sung Yu-ri (2005–2010)
- Um Ki-joon (2006–2021)
- Yeon Joon-seok (2017–2020)
- Yoon Kye-sang (g.o.d) (?–2009)

== Assets and subsidiaries ==
=== Broadcasting Division ===
- Cable television channels under the former YTN Media/CU Media
  - AXN (in partnership with Sony Pictures Television)
  - Comedy TV (ko)
  - Dramax (ko)
  - K-Star (ko) (formerly YTN Star and Y-star)
  - Life N
- Cube TV (in partnership with Cube Entertainment)

=== Wisepeer Inc. ===
- monkey3

=== Others ===
- APPIA Studio - TV series production company
- Gazi Contents - soundtrack production company and record label
- Film 6 - film distribution company

== See also ==
- iHQ discography
