= Jeon Hye-bin =

South Korean actress and singer (born 1983)

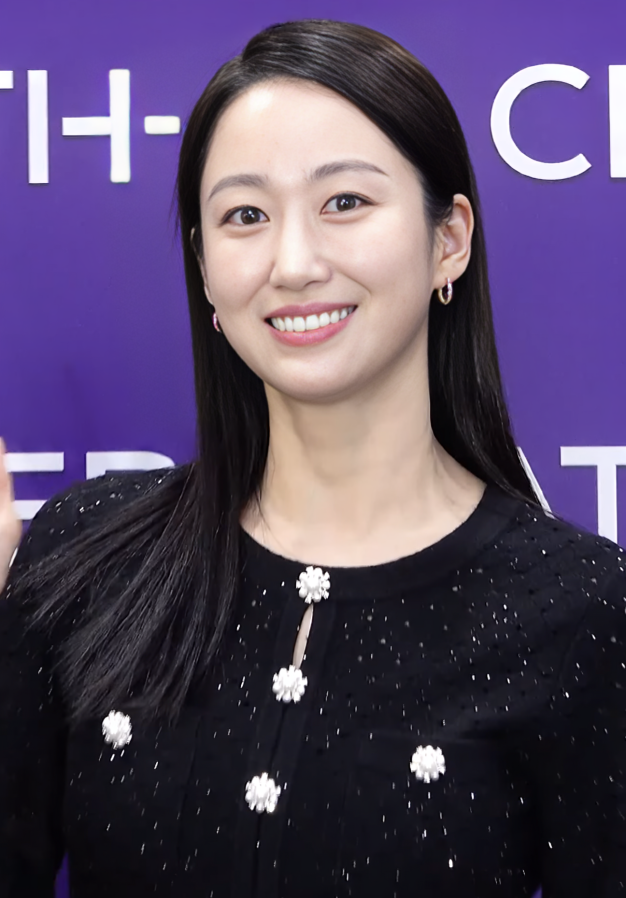
- Jeon in November 2024
- Born: September 27, 1983 (age 43); Namyangju, South Korea
- Education: Dongguk University
- Occupations: Singer; actress; model
- Years active: 2002–present
- Agents: Dream ENT; Namoo Actors; Ark Entertainment; Pan Stars Company
- Spouse: Unknown (m. 2019)
- Children: 1
- Musical career
- Also known as: BIN
- Genres: K-pop; dance
- Instrument: Vocals
- Formerly of: LUV

Korean name
- Hangul: 전혜빈
- Hanja: 全慧彬
- RR: Jeon Hyebin
- MR: Chŏn Hyebin
- IPA: tɕʌnh^{(j)}ebin

Jeon Hye-bin (Korean: 전혜빈; pronounced [tɕʌnh^{(j)}ebin]; born September 27, 1983), also known as BIN, is a South Korean actress, singer and model. In 2002, she began her career as singer of the short-lived, three-member girl group LUV. However, the group disbanded the following year due to individual goals.

Following the disbandment of LUV, Jeon released her first solo album, Love Somebody. She ventured into acting and appeared in her first television drama, Sang Doo! Let's Go to School, and was cast in the 2004 horror film Dead Friend. On 23 September 2005, she found mainstream success with her second album, In My Fantasy. She decided in 2008 to focus on her acting career and starred in the television series Yaksha (2010), My Love By My Side (2011), Insu, The Queen Mother (2011) and Queen of the Office (2013), Gunman in Joseon (2014) and Another Oh Hae-young (2016).

== Early life ==
Jeon was born in Namyangju, South Korea, on September 27, 1983. She attended Kyewon Arts High School and later furthered her studies at Dong guk University under the faculty of film and theater studies.

== Career ==
=== 2002: LUV ===
Jeon Hye-bin made her entertainment debut in 2002 with the band LUV, alongside Jo Eun-byul and Oh Yeon-seo. They released their first album Story that year, which included the singles "Orange Girl" and "I Still Believe in You". However, the group did not last long as they disbanded a year later due to each member expressing their own dreams.

=== 2003–2006: Acting debut and solo career ===
In 2003, Jeon appeared in the third season of MBC's sitcom Nonstop and was later cast in KBS' television series Sang Doo! Let's Go to School. Her first solo album Love Somebody was released on July 31.

In 2004, Jeon made her big screen debut in the horror film Dead Friend. She was then cast in Wet Dreams 2, a sex comedy film.

On May 22, 2005, she appeared on the 41st episode of Banjun Drama, a mini-drama series of SBS Good Sunday program, and subsequently appeared in 12 additional episodes. She also had a supporting role in SBS' romantic comedy series Only You.

Her second album In My Fantasy released on September 23, 2005. The title song, "2AM", which was produced by Mr. Tyfoon, was heavily criticized for its suggestive dance routine.

=== 2007–present: Acting career and further activities ===
In 2007, Jeon played supporting roles in romantic comedy series Witch Yoo Hee and historical drama The King and I. In 2008, she starred in the legal thriller drama The Scale of Providence.

In 2009, Jeon played a gumiho in a segment of Hometown of Legends, a ten-episode horror drama which consists of several stories of Korean traditional myths and folk tales.

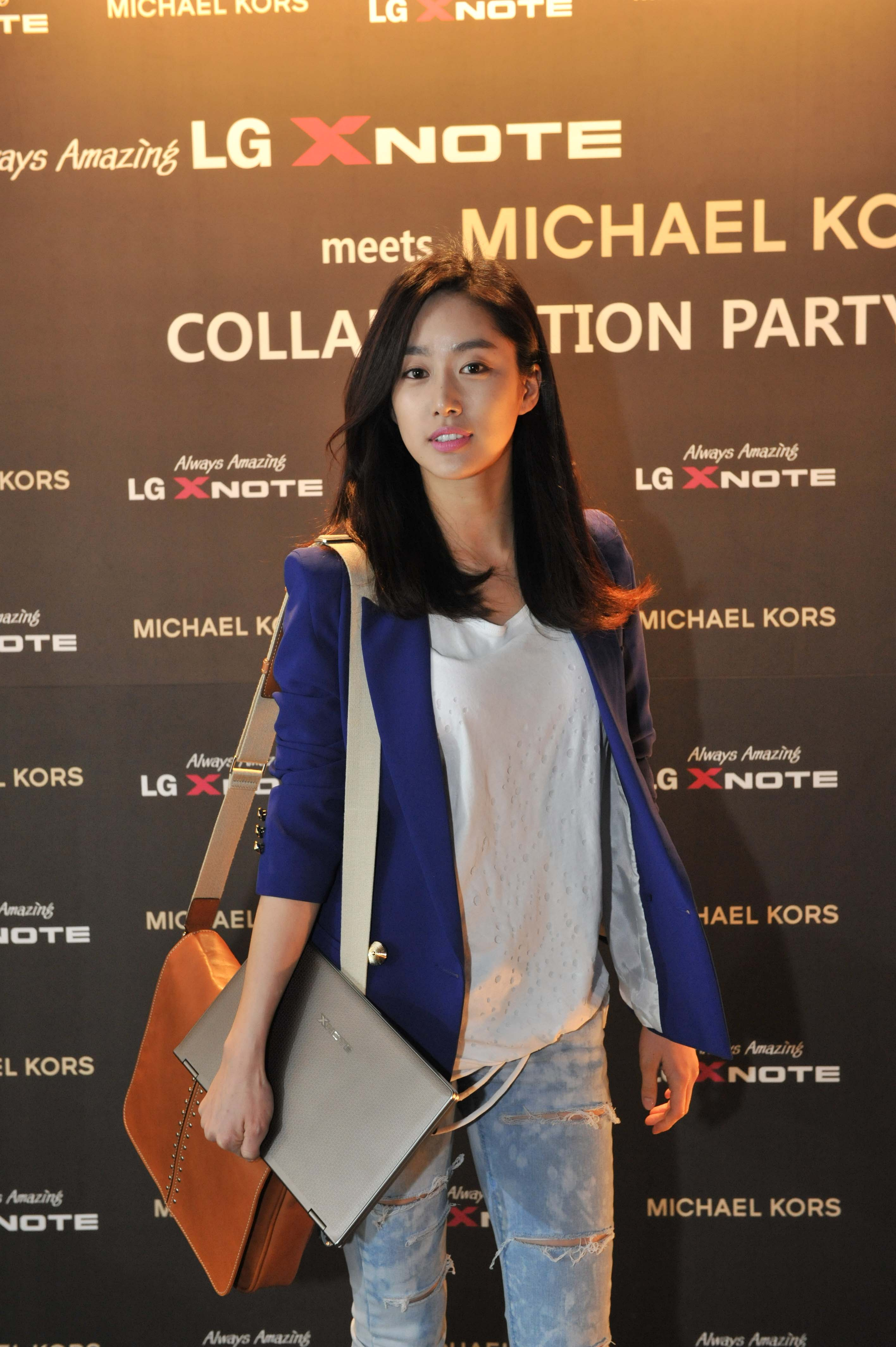
Jeon in 2010

In 2010, she played the leading role in OCN's action historical drama Yaksha.

In 2011, Jeon starred in SBS' family drama My Love By My Side. She next starred in JTBC's historical drama Insu, The Queen Mother, playing Queen Jeheon.

Jeon, who is well known for her love of fitness and exercise, released a beauty book titled Heaven's Stylish Body in 2011, which included her fitness and fashion tips. She followed up with the launch of an iPad diet app in 2012. On January 23, 2012, Jeon appeared in the 2012 Korean New Year Special of SBS' survival show Law of the Jungle W. She joined the show again in September, this time for the Madagascar episodes.

After a year-long hiatus from television, Jeon was cast in the KBS2 office drama Queen of the Office. In October 2013, Jeon joined the cast of Beating Hearts, a reality show with a group of celebrities training to become firefighters. On the 100th episode of Law of the Jungle: Borneo, she appeared as a guest.

In 2014, she was cast in KBS' period action drama Gunman in Joseon.

In 2015, Jeon was cast in the sports film The Legend of a Mermaid, playing a former national synchronized swimmer.

Jeon received renewed recognition as an actress with her role as "Gold Hae-young" in the romantic comedy series Another Oh Hae-young (2016). She next starred in the romance film With or Without You, playing a divorcee. The same year, Jeon featured in MBC's legal drama Woman with a Suitcase.

In 2017, Jeon starred in SBS' legal thriller Distorted.

In 2018, Jeon starred in the web drama Number Woman Gye Sook-ja. She was cast in the family drama film Cheer Up Mystery.

In 2019, Jeon starred in the family drama What's Wrong, Poong-sang and an American-remake series Leverage.

In June 2019, Jeon signed with new agency Pan Stars Company.

In December 2025, Jeon signed with new agency Dream ENT.

== Other ventures ==
Jeon was the CEO of ByHeaven (Korean: 바이헤븐), an online shopping mall which ceased operations in 2014.

=== Philanthropy ===
In 2005, Jeon was the ambassador of the Make-A-Wish Foundation in South Korea. On 29 October 2012, she donated the proceeds from her personally designed hair dryer to Make-A-Wish (Korea).

== Personal life ==
An accident in early 2006 forced Jeon to undergo nose and teeth reconstruction. She eventually confirmed that she underwent plastic surgery when rumors were quickly spreading about the change in her appearance.

Jeon married a non-celebrity on December 7, 2019 in Bali. On April 7, 2022, Jeon's agency announced that she is pregnant with her first child. On September 30, 2022, she gave birth to a son.

== Discography ==
=== Studio albums ===
| Album information | Track listing |
|---|---|
| In My Fantasy: Release Date: September 23, 2005; Format: CD, Digital Download; Label: EMI Music Korea Ltd. | 1. "Bin-Go"; 2. "2AM"; 3. "Why"; 4. "반지"; 5. "달을 삼킨 밤"; 6. "Mr. Crazy"; 7. "Pinky"; 8. "See Ya Later"; 9. "Back Of Mind"; 10. "Club"; 11. "2AM (MR)" |

=== Single albums ===
| Album information | Track listing |
|---|---|
| Love Somebody: Release Date: July 31, 2003; Format: CD, Digital Download; Label: OGAM Entertainment | 1. "Love Somebody"; 2. "입술"; 3. "Love Somebody" (Instrumental); 4. "입술" (Instrumental) |

== Filmography ==
=== Film ===
| Year | Title | Role | Notes | Ref. |
|---|---|---|---|---|
| 2004 | Dead Friend | Eun-seo | | |
| 2005 | Wet Dreams 2 | Park Soo-yeon | | |
| 2016 | With or Without You | U Yeon-i | | |
| 2016 | The Legend of a Mermaid | Yeong-joo | | |
| 2016 | Luck Key | Hye-bin | Cameo | |
| 2019 | Cheer Up, Mr. Lee | Eun-hee | | |
| TBA | Nineteen, Thirty-Nine | Jung Ju-ri | | |

=== Television series ===
| Year | Title | Role | Notes | Ref. |
|---|---|---|---|---|
| 2003 | Nonstop 3 | Herself | | |
| 2003 | Sang Doo! Let's Go to School | Yoon Hee-seo | | |
| 2003 | Drama City: "The Bean Chaff of My Life" | Hana | | |
| 2004 | Miracle | Sera | | |
| 2004 | Drama City: "I Love You Soo Hae ri" | Moon Young | | |
| 2005 | Banjun Drama | Various Roles | Episodes 41, 54, 57 & 59–68 | |
| 2005 | Only You | Cha Soo-jae | | |
| 2006 | Drama City: "Legend of the Three" | Oh Jung-ja | | |
| 2007 | Witch Yoo Hee | Nam Seung-mi | | |
| 2007 | The King and I | Seol-young | | |
| 2008 | The Scale of Providence | Noh Se-ra | | |
| 2008 | On Air | Herself | Cameo; Episode 3 | |
| 2009 | He Who Can't Marry | Lee Hwa-ran | Cameo; Episode 3, 6-8 | |
| 2009 | Hometown Legends: "Fox with Nine Tails" | So-ho | | |
| 2010 | KBS Drama Special: "The Angel of Death Comes With Purple High Heels" | Lee Ji-yeon | | |
| 2010 | Yaksha | Jeong Yeon | | |
| 2011 | My Love By My Side | Jo Yoon-jeong | | |
| 2011 | Insu, the Queen Mother | Deposed Queen Lady Yun | | |
| 2013 | The Queen of Office | Geum Bit-na | | |
| 2014 | KBS Drama Special: "The Taste of Curry" | Yoo-mi | | |
| 2014 | Gunman in Joseon | Choi Hye-won | | |
| 2014 | Healer | Kim Jae-yoon | Cameo; Episode 20 | |
| 2016 | Another Miss Oh | Oh Hae-young (gold) | | |
| 2016 | Woman with a Suitcase | Park Hye-Joo | | |
| 2016 | KBS Drama Special: "Noodle House Girl" | Min-ji | | |
| 2017 | Distorted | Oh Yoo-kyung | | |
| 2018 | The Beauty Inside | Han Se-gye | Cameo; Episode 16 | |
| 2018 | Life on Mars | Jung Seo-hyun | | |
| 2019 | Liver or Die | Lee Jeong-sang | | |
| 2019 | Leverage | Hwang Soo-kyung | | |
| 2020 | Oh My Baby | Kang Hyo-joo | Cameo; Episode 7 | |
| 2021 | Revolutionary Sisters | Lee Gwang-sik | | |
| 2025 | Beyond the Bar | Heo Min-jung | | |

=== Web series ===
| Year | Title | Role | Notes | Ref. |
|---|---|---|---|---|
| 2004 | Five Stars | Shin Young | | |
| 2018 | Number Woman, Gye Sook-ja | Gye Sook-ja | | |
| 2022 | Kiss Sixth Sense | Fishing couple wife | Cameo; Episode 3 | |

=== Television shows ===
| Year | Title | Role | Notes | Ref. |
|---|---|---|---|---|
| 2002–2003 | Kang Ho Dong's Match Made in Heaven | Herself | | |
| 2003 | Live Wow VJ | Herself | | |
| 2006–2007 | Heroine 6 | Herself | | |
| 2009 | Love Tree 36.5 | Herself | | |
| 2012 | Law of the Jungle W | Herself | 2012 Seollal Special | |
| 2012 | Law of the Jungle in Madagascar | Herself | Episodes 29–40 | |
| 2013–2014 | Heartbeat | Herself | | |
| 2014 | Law of the Jungle in Borneo | Herself | Episodes 100–102 | |
| 2015 | The Racer | Herself | | |
| 2015–2016 | Beauty Station the Show | Herself | Season 1 and 2 | |
| 2016 | Law of the Jungle in Tonga | Herself | Episodes 203–207 | |
| 2017 | Our School of Life | Herself | | |
| 2018 | Law of the Jungle in Antarctica | Herself | Episodes 311–314 | |
| 2018–present | Follow Me 9 | Herself | | |

=== Music video appearances ===
| Year | Title | Artist | Notes | Ref. |
|---|---|---|---|---|
| 2005 | "Flip Reverse" | Jang Woo-hyuk | | |
| 2006 | "Living a Day in Winter" | Brian Joo | | |
| 2008 | "Thorn Fish" | MC The Max | | |
| 2009 | "Do You Know" | Someday | | |
| 2012 | "I Want to Live with Her" | UV | Featuring Yoon Do-hyun | |

== Theater ==
| Year | Title | Role | Notes |
|---|---|---|---|
| 2008 | Hamlet | Ophelia | |
| 2009–2010 | Singles | – | |

== Bibliography ==
- Heaven's Stylish Body (전혜빈의 스타일리시 바디; Published on 27 June 2011; ISBN 9788997105007)

== Awards and nominations ==
Name of the award ceremony, year presented, category, nominee of the award, and the result of the nomination
| Award ceremony | Year | Category | Nominee / Work | Result | Ref. |
|---|---|---|---|---|---|
| APAN Star Awards | 2012 | Fashionista Award | Jeon Hye-bin | Won | |
| APAN Star Awards | 2016 | Best Supporting Actress | Another Oh Hae-young | Nominated | |
| KBS Drama Awards | 2014 | Best Supporting Actress | Gunman in Joseon | Nominated | |
| KBS Drama Awards | 2021 | Excellence Award, Actress in a Serial Drama | Revolutionary Sisters | Nominated | |
| Korea Drama Awards | 2011 | Special Award for Cable TV | Yaksha | Won | |
| Korea Drama Awards | 2019 | Best Couple Award | Liver or Die | Nominated | |
| Korea Drama Awards | 2019 | Netizen Award, Actress | Liver or Die | Nominated | |
| MBC Drama Awards | 2016 | Excellence Award, Actress in a Special Project Drama | Woman with a Suitcase | Nominated | |
| SBS Drama Awards | 2017 | Excellence Award, Actress in a Monday-Tuesday Drama | Distorted | Nominated | |
| SBS Entertainment Awards | 2012 | Best Entertainer | Law of the Jungle | Won | |
| SBS Entertainment Awards | 2018 | Best Challenger Award | Law of the Jungle | Won | |
