= Wet Dreams 2 =

2005 film directed by Jeong Cho-sin

- Theatrical poster
- Hangul: 몽정기 2
- Hanja: 夢精기 2
- RR: Mongjeonggi 2
- MR: Mongjŏnggi 2
- Directed by: Jeong Cho-shin
- Written by: Park Chae-wun
- Produced by: Lee Eun; Choi Jin-hwa
- Starring: Song Eun-chae; Jeon Hye-bin; Park Seul-gi; Lee Ji-hoon; Shin Joo-ah; Park Ye-jin
- Cinematography: Seo Jeong-min
- Edited by: Nam Na-yeong
- Music by: Lee Young-ho
- Distributed by: Lotte Entertainment
- Release date: January 14, 2005 (South Korea)
- Running time: 101 minutes
- Country: South Korea
- Language: Korean

Wet Dreams 2 (Korean: 몽정기 2; RR: Mongjeonggi 2) is a 2005 South Korean film. Comedic but more serious than its predecessor Wet Dreams, it follows four girls in high school as they become curious about sex and compete for the affection of their new teacher.

== Plot ==
The film, set in 1992, starts with a marriage ceremony of Sungeun's sister, and the high school girls envy the married couple and dreams of meeting their true love. The girls' names are Sung-eun (Kang Eunbi), Soo-yeon (Jeon Hye-bin), who fights bullies, and Mi-sook (Park Seul-ki) and they are all disappointed about not being a popular girl like Baek-saemi, who is a celebrity. Kang Bong-goo (Lee Ji-hoon), the new student teacher suffers from a problem where he farts when aroused. Bong-goo's friend tries to examine if that is a real problem and asks him to watch the Jean Jacque Arnot film The Lover together, but the girls happen to be in the same theatre, that an R-rated film is being screened, to watch the movie, and Sung-eun falls in love with Bong-goo the next day in the classroom. Sung-eun and Baek-saemi compete to get Bong goo's attraction. After Baek-saemi dares Sung-eun to have sex with him, Sung-eun explores her sexuality, and tries to have sex with Bong-goo. After visiting his house, she believes she really did have sex, but realizes she did not take contraceptive measures. This leads the girls to consult with Sung-inhwa, a female student who consults in terms of sex education. Sung-inhwa is later revealed to be a person who secretly loved Soo-yeon. Also, Sung-eun realizes she cannot be pregnant yet, as she has not had her first period. After her first period, she proposes to Bong-goo again, but is soon disappointed after seeing him hanging out with Baek-saemi. This is later revealed to be him consulting with Baek-saemi about her relationship with teacher Kim-dong-soo.

== Cast ==
- Lee Ji-hoon as Kang Bang-goo
- Kang Eun-bi as Oh Sung-eun
- Jeon Hye-bin as Park Soo-yeon
- Park Seul-gi as Kim Mi-sook
- Shin Joo-ah as Baek Se-mi
- Jeon Jae-hyeong as Ji Suk-goo
- Park Kil-soo as AIDS/Chan Sung-bok
- Kim Ji-young as Biology teacher
- Park Ye-jin as Bride (Sung-eun's older sister)
- Kim Do-yeon as Member of the tango dance team
- Kim Hae-sook as Sung-eun's mom
- Jung Dong-hwan as Sung-eun's dad
- Jeong Yu-mi as Class president
- Park Chae-kyeong as 2nd year-3 class student
- Lee Min-jung as 2nd year-3 class student
- Son Yeo-eun as 2nd year-3 class student
- Cho Hanna as 2nd year-3 class student
- Lee Soo-kyung as Wedding guest
- Ko Ho-kyeong as Da-eun
- Lee Ho-young as Student teacher
