= Jo Eun-byul =

South Korean singer (born 1982)

- Birth name: Jo Eun-byul
- Also known as: Evie Cho
- Born: June 23, 1982 (age 43)
- Origin: Seoul, South Korea
- Genres: K-pop, R&B
- Occupation(s): Singer, actress
- Years active: 2002–present
- Labels: Coo Entertainment
- Formerly of: LUV

- Korean name
- Hangul: 조은별
- RR: Jo Eunbyeol
- MR: Cho Ŭnbyŏl

Jo Eun-byul (Korean: 조은별; Korean pronunciation: [tɕʰo.ɯnbjɘːl]; born on June 23, 1982) is a South Korean singer and stage actress known as Eun-byul (은별) or Evie (이비). She was the leader and lead singer of the now disbanded K-pop group, LUV.

== Career ==
She started her career as the leader of K-pop group, LUV. After the group achieved mild success and a large fanbase, LUV disbanded and Jo Eun-byul, along with the other two members (Jeon Hye-bin and Oh Yeon-seo) decided to pursue their own personal goals.

Eun-byul worked as a stage actress in musicals in Daehangno for 7 years before signing to Coo Entertainment and releasing her solo mini-album entitled Oneul Haruman (오늘 하루만, This Day) on October 26, 2009. The mini-album contains a song called "Orange Sunshine" that features former bandmate, Jeon Hye-bin.

As of February 2014, Eun-byul is still working as a musical actress under the name of 'Evie Cho'.

== Discography ==
Album Information	Track Listing
This Day (오늘 하루만): Release Date: October 26, 2009; Label: Coo Entertainment	1. 오늘 하루만; 2. 설리 이야기; 3. 그래서; 4. 거울을 보며; 5. Orange Sunshine (With Jeon Hye-bin); 6. Orange Sunshine (With Jeon Hye-bin) (Suda Cut ver.)

=== Music Videos ===
- I Still Believe in You (2002)
- Orange Girl (2002)
