= Dead Friend =

- Theatrical release poster
- Hangul: 령
- Lit.: Ghost
- RR: Ryeong
- MR: Ryŏng
- Directed by: Kim Tae-gyeong
- Written by: Kim Tae-gyeong
- Produced by: Jeong Oh-young
- Starring: Kim Ha-neul; Ryu Jin; Nam Sang-mi; Shin Yi; Jeon Hye-bin; Lee Yoon-ji; Jeon Hee-ju
- Cinematography: Mun Yong-sik
- Edited by: Kim Yong-su
- Music by: Choi Wan-hee; Hyeon Gyu-hwan
- Distributed by: Showbox
- Release date: June 18, 2004
- Running time: 98 minutes
- Country: South Korea
- Language: Korean

Dead Friend (Korean: 령; lit. 'Ghost') is a 2004 South Korean horror film written and directed by Kim Tae-gyeong. It is one of a number of South Korean horror films set in high school; the trend began with 1998's Whispering Corridors.

== Plot ==
Three high school girls are bored and decide to conduct a séance with a bunshinsaba - a traditional Korean ouija board. As the spirit is called by Eun-jeong (Lee Yoon-ji), her sister, Eun-seo (Jeon Hye-bin), scolds the girls. Eun-jeong jokingly wishes that the ghost had taken Eun-seo away and that if they do not send the ghost away, it will kill them. Eun-seo is then killed by a ghostly water presence.

The amnesiac Min Ji-won (Kim Ha-neul), who is an expert swimmer, begins to have nightmares of a ghost from her forgotten past, which seems to be connected to water. She is confronted by an estranged friend, Yu-jeong, who tells her that because of Ji-won, "Su-in" is coming for them. Yu-jeong is soon found dead.

Ji-won slowly remembers that she used to lead an elitist clique back in high school which consisted of herself, Eun-seo, Yu-jeong, and Mi-gyeong. Before she became part of the clique, Ji-won was friends with Su-in (Nam Sang-mi), but her ego turned her to regard the introverted Su-in as a laughingstock. Ji-won visits her last remaining clique member, Mi-gyeong, who is confined to a mental hospital, but the latter lashes out at her. Ji-won learns from Su-in's mother that the event that led to her amnesia was a trip to a forest with the girls, from which Su-in never came back. Mi-gyeong is drowned by the ghost.

Heading to a spring in the forest, Ji-won finally remembers the event: Ji-won asks Su-in if she can swim, then pushes her into the spring. Su-in comes up and the girls laugh. The three girls then push Ji-won in as a joke, but upon learning that she can't swim, Su-in dived to save her. While Ji-won was saved, Su-in got stuck in the riverbed and drowned. The other girls just watch as this happens. Ji-won alerts the authorities and informs Su-in's grieving mother.

Ji-won returns to her mother, only to realize the horrifying truth: Ji-won and Su-in had swapped bodies during their struggle to get out of the spring. "Ji-won" did not lose her memories because she was never Ji-won in the first place; she is actually Su-in. Ji-won's spirit has been terrorizing her and the clique to gain her body back, and now she inhabits her mother. Her mother vomits water and collapses. Ji-won crawls out but Su-in cuts her wrist so Ji-won can't take her. Ji-won's boyfriend, Jun-ho, comes to save them and they are rushed to the hospital. Su-in is later seen walking through the fish market where her mother, who believes her daughter has died, works. She leaves after hesitating, while her mother looks ominously at her with Ji-won's tell-tale smirk, implying that Ji-won has possessed Su-in's mother.

== Cast ==
- Kim Ha-neul as Min Ji-won
- Ryu Jin as Park Jun-ho
- Nam Sang-mi as Su-in
- Shin Yi as Mi-gyeong
- Jeon Hye-bin as Eun-seo
- Lee Yoon-ji as Eun-jeong
- Jeon Hee-ju as Yu-jeong
- Kim Hae-sook as Ji-won's mother
- Choi Ran as Su-in's mother
- Gi Ju-bong as Detective
- Greena Park as Yu-jeong's friend
- Joo Da-young as young Su-in
