= 2Eyes =

South Korean girl group

- Origin: South Korea
- Genres: K-pop; Dance pop
- Years active: 2013–2015
- Labels: SidusHQ/LOEN Entertainment
- Past members: Hyangsuk; Hyerin; Dasom; Daeun; Yeonjun

2Eyes (Korean: 투아이즈), stylized in all caps, was a South Korean girl group formed by SidusHQ. They made their debut in 2013 as a five-member group and consisted of Hyangsuk, Hyerin, Dasom, Daeun and Yeonjun. Following Yeonjun's departure, the group continues to promote as a four-member group.

== History ==
=== Pre-debut ===
2Eyes was formed by SidusHQ with Hyun Jin-young as their producer. It was SidusHQ's first investment into a K-pop group since the short-lived girl group LUV and the highly successful first-generation boy band g.o.d. Prior to receiving their current name, the group was called "god5" (갓파이브) as they were modeled after the five-member g.o.d.

Hyangsuk and Dasom had both competed in the jTBC talent competition Made in U before joining SidusHQ. Hyerin was a former JYP Entertainment trainee. Daeun had been a dancer. Yeonjun, the youngest member, was the final member recruited and had been part of an unsuccessful duo called Spiel (스피넬로) before joining the KBS singing competition program The Last Audition of My Life where she was scouted by SidusHQ.

Prior to their official debut, 2Eyes recorded their version of "Winter Love" (겨울사랑), one of the soundtracks of the critically acclaimed SBS drama That Winter, the Wind Blows. It was released in May 2013.

=== 2013: Debut ===
The group name was derived from the idea of the members communicating with the audience through their eyes. They then made their debut on June 20, 2013, performing their single "Don't Mess With Me" (까불지마) on the Mnet music program M Countdown. The single album and music video for "Don't Mess With Me" were released in July. The music video featured fellow SidusHQ artist, actor Kim Woo-bin. Their debut drew much attention from critics as their management agency SidusHQ was better known for managing some of South Korea's top actors and actresses rather than musicians.

=== 2015: Comeback ===
After Yeonjun's departure, 2Eyes decided to continue promoting as a four-member group. They made their comeback on August 24, 2015 with the single "PIPPI", which is based on the children's stories character Pippi Longstocking. The music video featured all for members dressed like Pippi Longstocking before transforming into beautiful young women. In September, their company SidusHQ received a complaint from the Swedish company Saltkråkan which owned the copyright to the character Pippi Longstocking over the group's use of the concept without permission.

== Members ==
- Lee Hyang-suk (이향숙) – vocals, leader
- Kim Hye-rin (김혜린) – rap
- Lee Da-som (이다솜) – rap
- Jung Da-eun (정다은) – vocals

Former member(s)

- Kim Yeon-jun (김연준)

== Artistry and image ==
When they debuted, 2Eyes opted for strong feminine and sexy image. Unlike many girl groups who debuted at the time with bubblegum pop and "cute" concepts, 2Eyes drew attention for doing the opposite and debuting with a more mature image.

== Discography ==
=== Single albums ===
Title	Album details	Peak positions	Sales (DL)
Title	Album details	KOR	Sales (DL)
Don't Mess With Me (까불지마)	Released: June 21, 2013; Label: SidusHQ, LOEN Entertainment; Format: CD, digital download	—	—
Shooting Star	Released: October 8, 2013; Label: SidusHQ, LOEN Entertainment; Format: CD, digital download	90	KOR: 26,647+
Pippi	Released: August 26, 2015; Label: SidusHQ, CJ E&M; Format: CD, digital download	—	—
