= NXT (TV channel) =

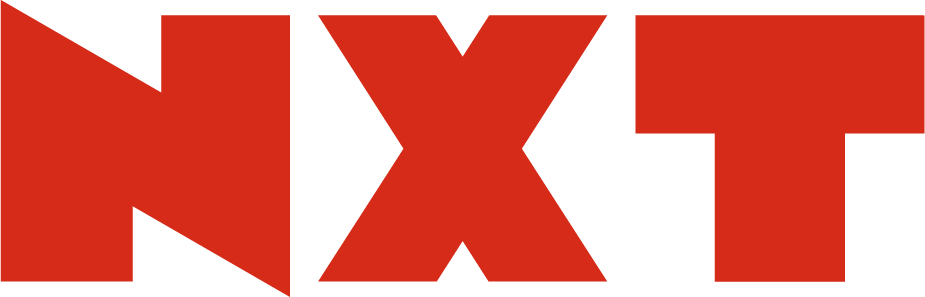
- Country: South Korea

Programming
- Language: Korean
- Picture format: 1080i HDTV

Ownership
- Owner: Sony Pictures Entertainment (2005–2025); Fil Con Media (2019–present)

History
- Launched: July 1, 2005; 20 years ago
- Former names: AXN (2005-2025)

Links
- Website: www.fillcon.co.kr/nxt

NXT is a South Korean cable and satellite television channel focusing on American crime and action TV series.

== History ==
Originally launched in July 2005 as AXN, a joint venture between Sony and SkyLife, AXN was broadcast from outside South Korea, but it had Korean subtitles, and every trailer was displayed in Korean (although Korean audio track was not possible because of local regulations). Also, it was a version exclusively broadcast to South Korea, different from original United States television channel, in scheduling and programmes. It was available exclusively to SkyLife subscribers but made available to other platforms later, like Mega TV.

In April 2011, after switching South Korean partner to what was known then as CU Media (which later became a television division of IHQ, which is in turn owned by cable television provider D'Live), AXN began broadcasting from Seoul, and became a part of CU Media. While respecting South Korean TV rating system and mandatory carriage of local programmes, this enabled Korean voice-overs on their trailers and broadcast of local commercial advertisements.

In January 2020, AXN Asia, along with the other Sony-owned Asian channels, were sold to former Sony Pictures Television executives at KC Global Media. AXN Korea was excluded from the sale and continued to be operated by CU Media. In 2025, the channel rebranded to NXT after its contract with Sony Pictures expired.
