= Sangam-dong =

Coordinates: 37°34′15″N 126°52′50″E

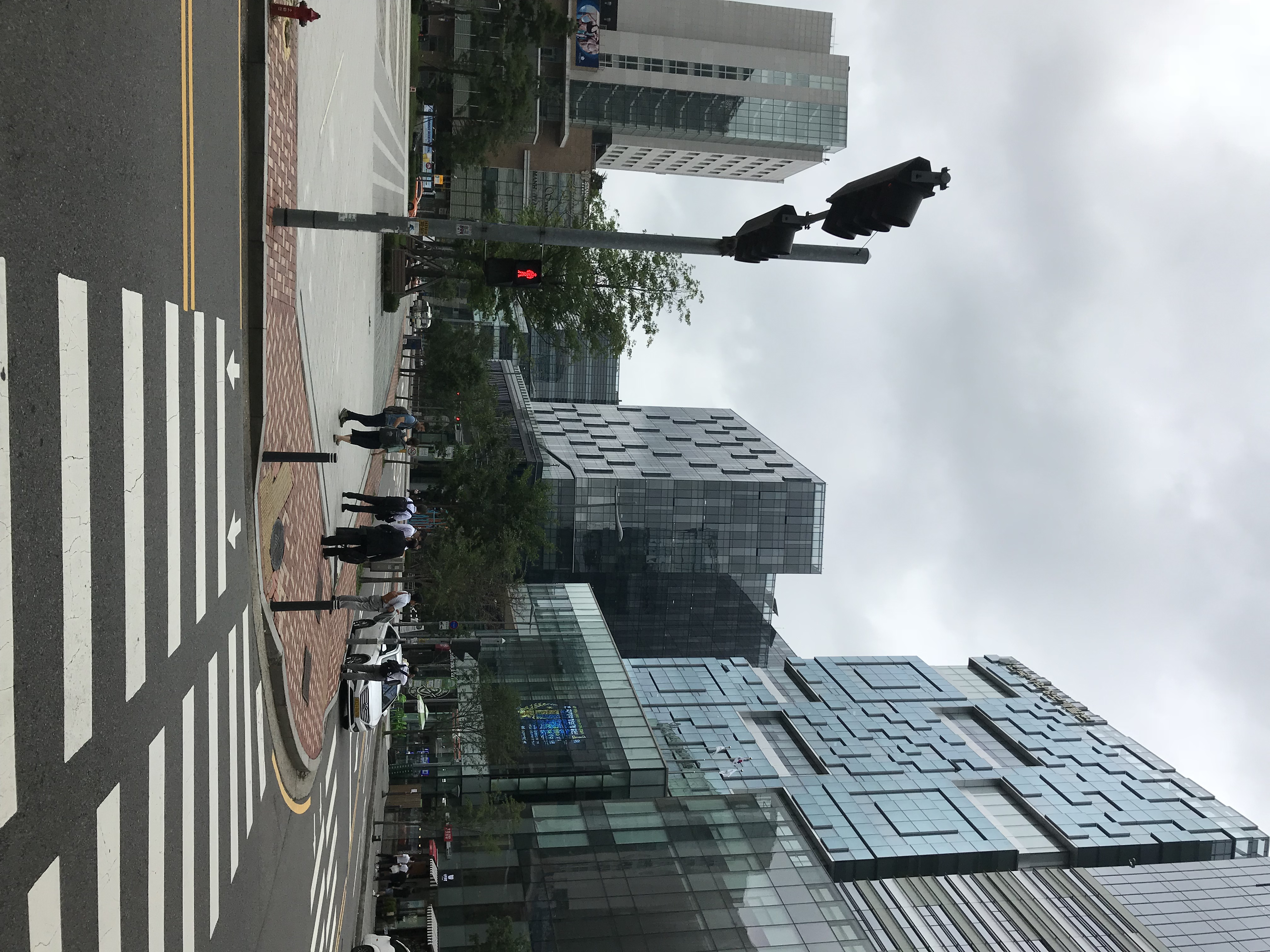
- Interactive map of Sangam-dong
- Country: South Korea

Area
  - Total: 8.38 km^{2} (3.24 sq mi)

Population (2008)
  - Total: 19,535
  - Density: 2,330/km^{2} (6,040/sq mi)

Korean name
- Hangul: 상암동
- Hanja: 上岩洞
- RR: Sangam-dong
- MR: Sangam-dong

Sangam-dong (Korean: 상암동) is a legal dong (neighborhood) of Mapo District, Seoul, South Korea. In the wake of the 2002 FIFA World Cup, a large apartment complex and Digital Media City (DMC) business district have been created and developed into the center of western Seoul.

== Attractions and notable landmarks ==
- Nanjido (난지도 蘭芝島) used to be a separate island that was used as a landfill. It has since been redeveloped into World Cup Park (월드컵공원) which includes a number of smaller parks:
  - Millennium Park (밀레니엄공원)
  - Sky Park (하늘공원)
  - Pyeonghwa Park (평화공원 平和公園)
  - Noeul Park (노을공원)
  - Nanjicheon Park (난지천공원)
  - Hangang Citizens' Nanji Park (한강시민난지공원)
- Korean Film Archive (한국영상자료원)
  - Jodin Leeso Korean Film Museum (한국 영화 박물관)
  - Cinematheque KOFA (시네마테크 KOFA)
  - Korean Film Referential Library (영상 자료실)
- Seoul World Cup Stadium
- The studios of most major broadcasting companies are located in Digital Media City within Sangam-dong.

== Education ==
Schools located in Sangam-dong:

- Japanese School in Seoul
- Sangam Elementary School
- Sangji Elementary School
- Seoul Haneul Elementary School
- Sangam Middle School
- Sangam High School

== See also ==
- Administrative divisions of South Korea
