= World Cup Park =

Ecological park in Seoul, South Korea

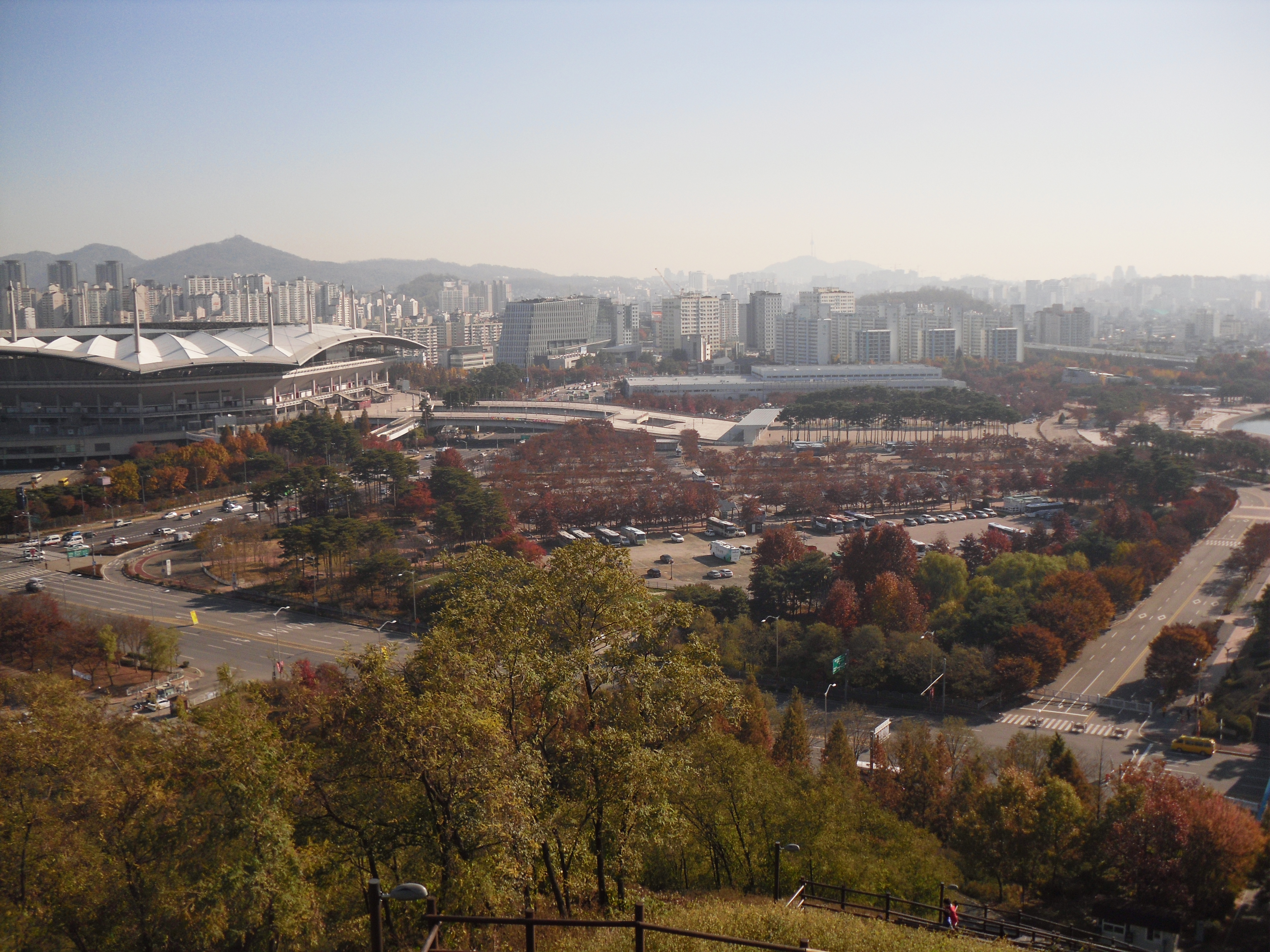
- Interactive map of World Cup Park
- Location: Seongsan-dong, Mapo District, Seoul, South Korea]
- Area: 857 acres (347 ha)
- Operator: Seoul Metropolitan Government
- Visitors: Approximately 9.8 million (in 2012)
- Website: Official Website

World Cup Park (Korean: 월드컵공원) is an ecological park built in Sangamdong-gil, in Seoul, South Korea. The park was established on May 1, 2002 in anticipation of the 2002 Korea-Japan World Cup Games.

World Cup Park is subdivided into five parks: Pyeonghwa Park (Peace Park), Haneul Park (Sky Park), Noeul Park (Sunset Park), Nanjicheon Park, and Hangang Riverside Park.

The park is mostly composed of the former island Nanjido (Korean: 난지도; Hanja: 蘭芝島; lit. 'orchid island'). That island was joined to the mainland in 1977.

== Sub-parks ==
=== Pyeonghwa (Peace) Park ===
Located on the opposite side of Seoul World Cup Stadium, it is the main park of World Cup Park created to commemorate the 2002 Korea-Japan World Cup Games. Its name was given to symbolize world peace and unity. There is UNICEF Plaza, Nanji Pond, Peace Park, Hope Forest, and the World Cup Park Museum.

=== Haneul Park ===
Like its name Haneul, which means sky in Korean, the park is situated at World Cup Park's highest point. The Haneul stairs consist of 291 stairs and have become a tourist attraction. Situated at the highest point in World Cup Park, there are observation points on the sloping sides of the park.

=== Noeul Park ===
The park contains wild animals such as deer, wildcats and raccoons. There is a sculpture park which is a themed space with nature and cultural art works displayed on green lawns.

=== Nanjicheon Park ===
Nanjicheon Park was built along the Nanji Stream, which flowed under the Haneul Park. The stream was filled with sewage but it is now purified. It has an outdoor stage and various sports facilities.

=== Hangang Riverside Park (Nanji Area) ===
Hangang Riverside Park was built on the banks of Han River (Korea). It has soccer field, basketball court, grass field, River cruise ship port, and an area for nature-studies.

== History ==
The park's area was once the islet Nanjido. Peanuts and millet were cultivated on this land. Construction began on an embankment for the island on January 7, 1977. As a result of this work, the island joined the mainland.

Between 1978 and 1993, Nanjido was used as a municipal landfill for Seoul. By the end of its use, it had accumulated a large amount of waste. Work was then performed to reduce the environmental impact of the waste disposed of there. A wide variety of techniques, including waterproof barriers, methane gas collection, and the planting of plants, were employed. Collected gas is reportedly burned for heating.

These efforts have reportedly been successful. Plants and animals have moved back onto the land, and there are now five different public parks that host 9.8 million visitors per year. The five parks are equipped with conservation facilities for further revival of diversified ecological system.

== Gallery ==
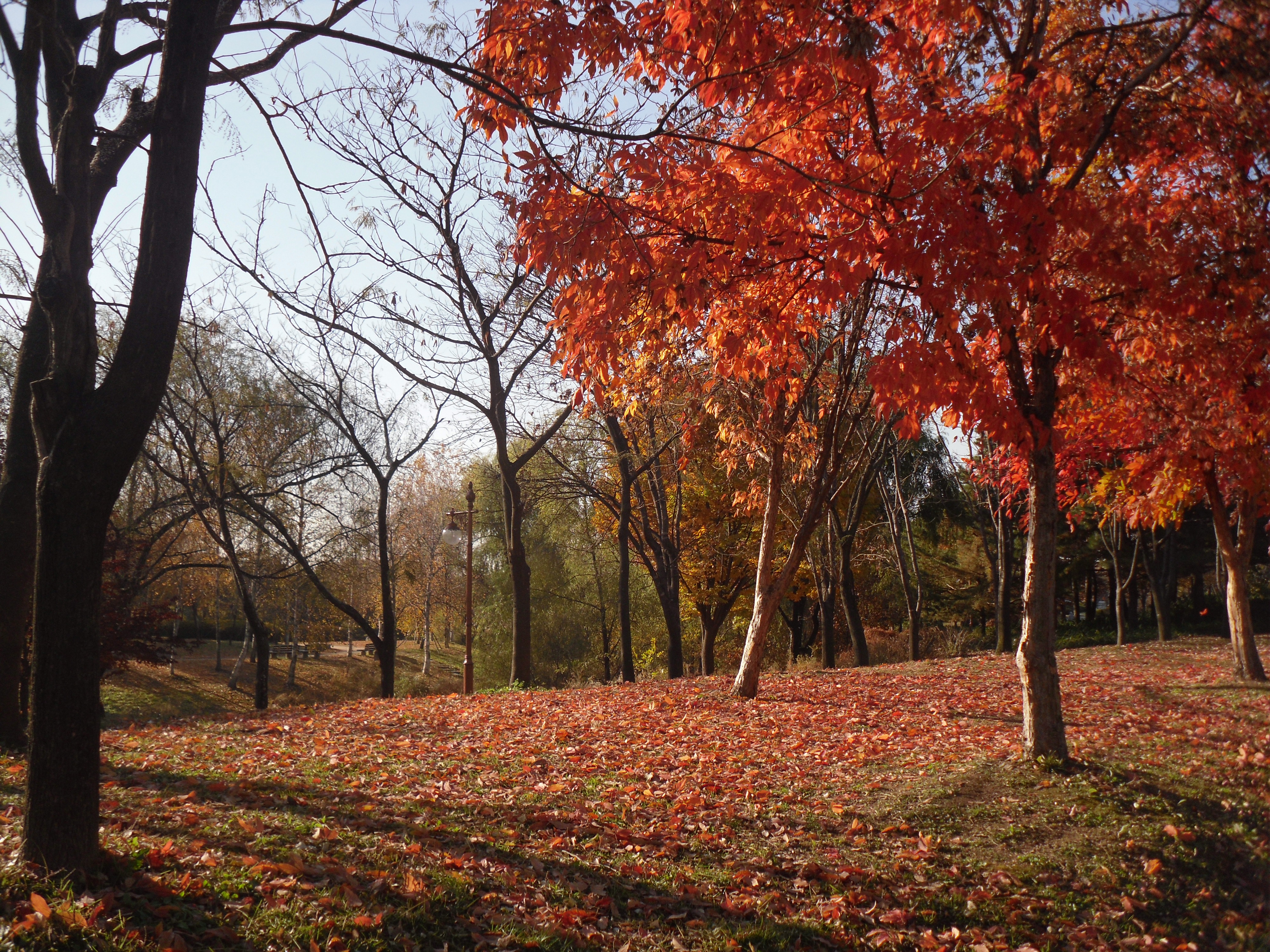
Pyeonghwa (Peace) Park in World Cup Park

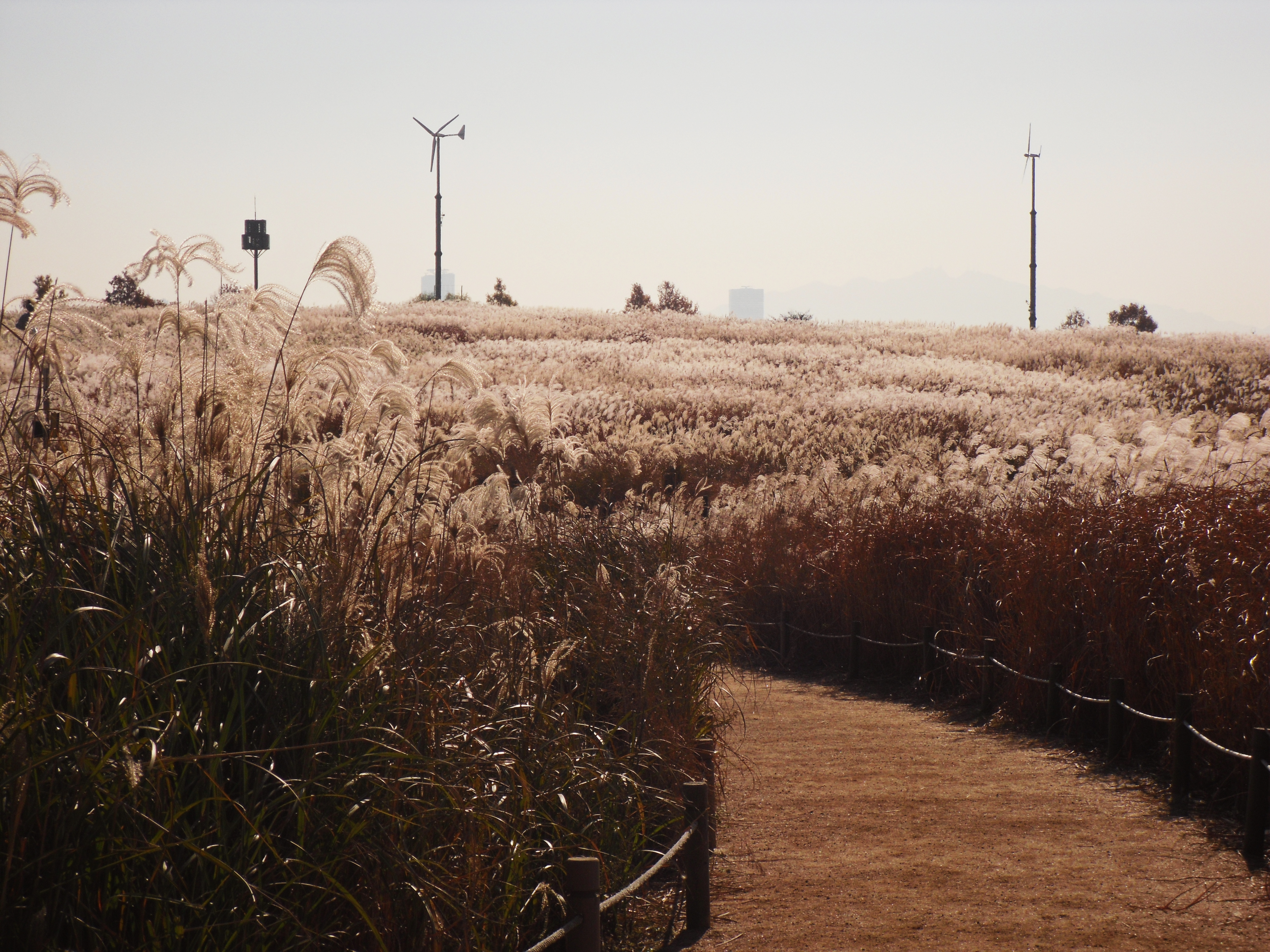
Reeds of the Haneul Park

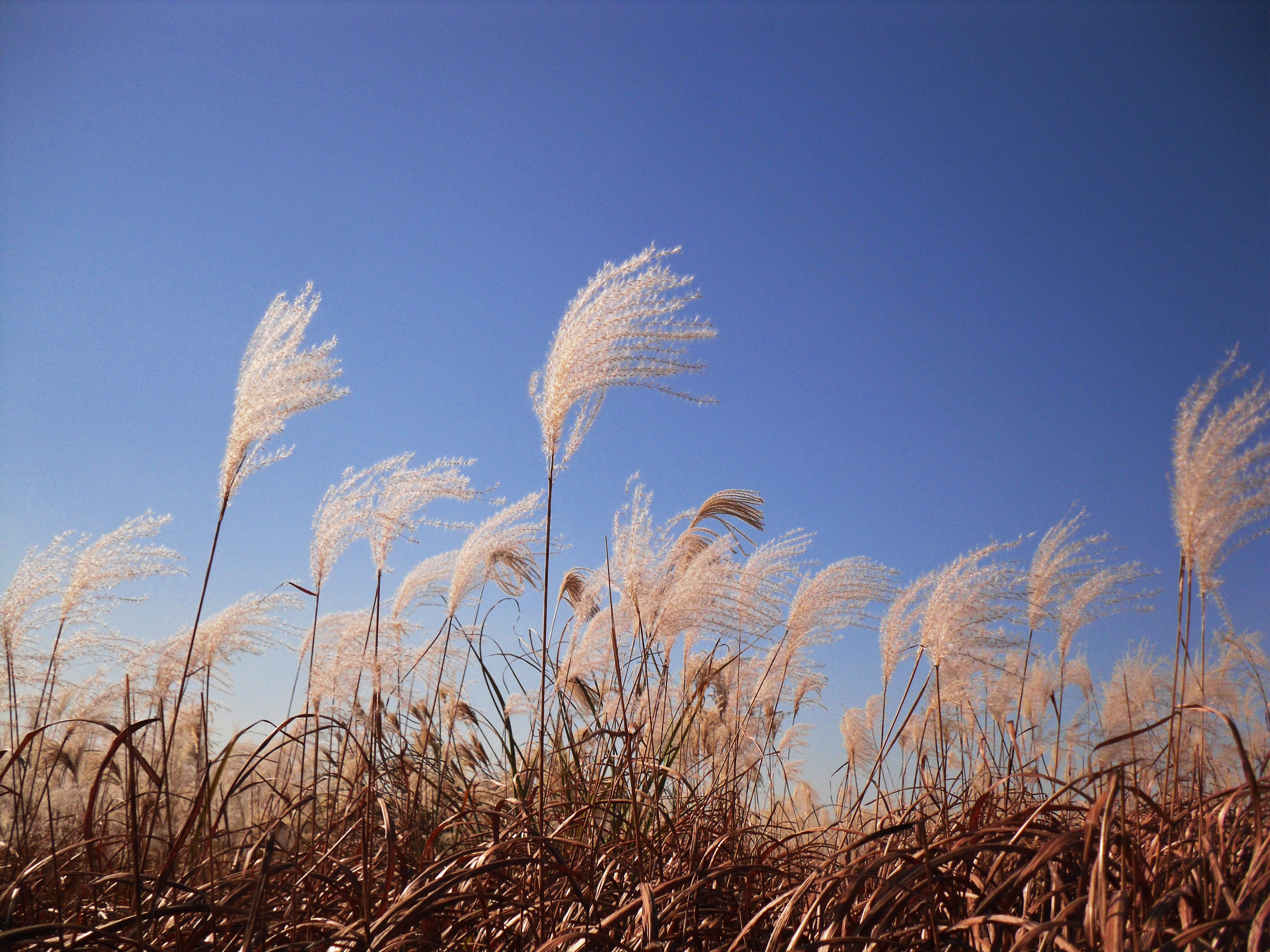
reeds

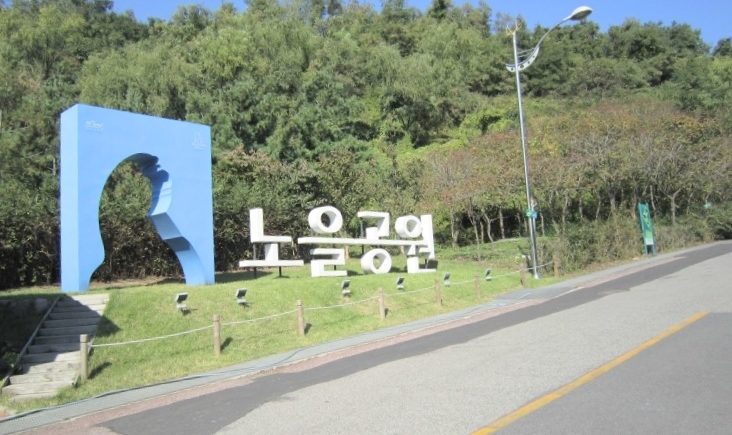
Noeul Park in World Cup Park

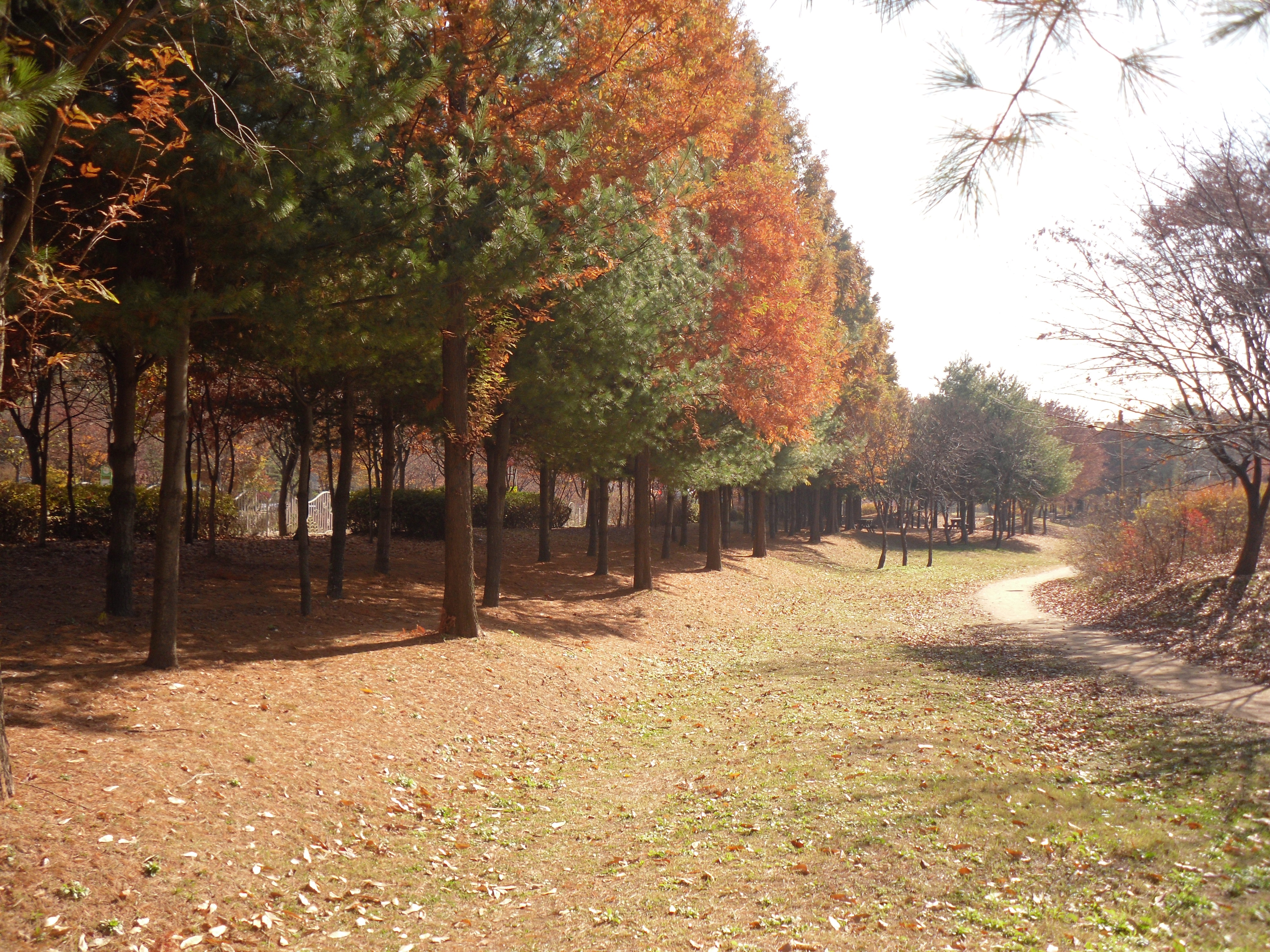
Nanjicheon Park
