= Luv (group) =

South Korean girl group

LUV
- Origin: South Korea
- Genres: K-pop; R&B; pop
- Years active: 2002–2003
- Label: SidusHQ
- Past members: Eun-byul; Bin; Haetnim

LUV (Korean: 러브) was a short-lived K-pop girl group founded by SidusHQ, consisting of Jo Eun-byul, Jeon Hye-bin, and Oh Haet-nim, who would later change her name to Oh Yeon-seo. As stated by LUV in an interview, LUV stands for "Love your Voice", stating that everyone should love themselves and their strengths and flaws in their hearts.

== Biography ==
=== 2002: Debut ===
They were first featured on JTL's "A Better Day" as the female singers on the song. Shortly thereafter, they debuted with "Orange Girl", which was very popular, as it was performed numerous times. They released their second single, "I Still Believe in You", with an accompanying music video soon thereafter. Their first album, Story, was released on May 15, 2002. Sometime in August, LUV promoted "Tears" from the same album and performed it at a military concert along with groups such as S.E.S. and Fin.K.L. They were credited as having massive potential, and were compared numerous times to S.E.S.

=== 2003: Disbandment ===
Although the band was popular and had a large fanbase, they did not last long, as each member had their own dream. The band quickly split after one year of mild success and pursued personal goals. Jeon Hye-bin released a solo album and pursued an acting career, and her past experiences in the group led to her success as a singer. Oh Yeon-seo pursued an acting career, and Jo Eun-byul has been working as a stage actress in musicals in the playhouse district of Daehangno since LUV disbanded, although she was featured in a performance of JTL's "A Better Day" in 2005. Eun-byul, now known as LeeBie (이비), has released a solo mini-album titled 오늘 하루만 (This Day) on October 26, 2009. On November 11, 2009, LUV reunited for a showcase, but a reunion is not completely clear. On March 30, 2010, their album, Story was released for purchase on iTunes after eight years.

== Members ==
- Eunbyul
- Hatnim
- Bin

== Discography ==
=== Studio albums ===
Title	Details
Story - Orange Girl	Released: May 15, 2002; Label: Yejeon Media
