= Shinhwa videography =

Shinhwa video discography
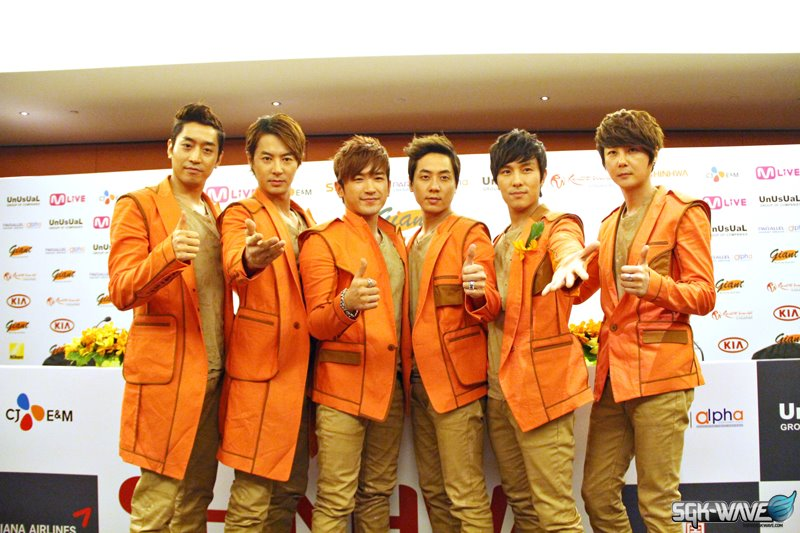
- Shinhwa Grand Tour in Singapore press conference on 16 June 2012 (L to R: Eric, Jun Jin, Lee Min-woo, Andy, Kim Dong-wan and Shin Hye-sung)
- Music videos: 43
- Music video compilations: 3
- Concert tour videos: 13
- Documentaries: 6

This is the videography by South Korean six-member boy band Shinhwa. Formed in 1998 under SM Entertainment, the band consists of Eric Mun, Lee Min-woo, Kim Dong-wan, Shin Hye-sung, Jun Jin and Andy Lee. They moved to Good Entertainment in July 2003, upon the expiration of their contract. In 2011, after a four-year hiatus, during which they served individual mandatory military services, they formed the Shinhwa Company to continue to perform together. This list the official music videos released by SM Entertainment, Good Entertainment and Shinhwa Company.

== Music videos ==
Year	Title	Album	Director
1998	"Resolver"^{[B]} (Korean: "해결사")	Shinhwa	
1998	"Eusha! Eusha!" (Korean: "으쌰! 으쌰!")	Shinhwa	
1998	"Sharing Forever" (Korean: "천일유혼")	Shinhwa	
1999	"Yo! (Brat Report)"^{[B]} (Korean: "Yo! (악동보고서)")	T.O.P.	
1999	"T.O.P." (Twinkling of Paradise)	T.O.P.	Hong Jong-ho
2000	"Only One"	Only One	
2000	"All Your Dreams"	Only One	
2000	"First Love"	Only One	
2000	"Wedding March (Your Side)"^{[B]} (Korean: "Wedding March (너의 곁에서)")	Only One	
2000	"Prayer"^{[B]} (Korean: "기도")	Christmas Winter Vacation in SMTown.com	
2001	"Hey, Come On!"	Hey, Come On!	Hong Jong-ho
2001	"Wild Eyes"	Hey, Come On!	Lee Doo-hwan
2002	"My Life Style"	My Choice	Chun Hyuk-jin
2002	"Perfect Man"	Perfect Man	Chun Hyuk-jin
2002	"I Pray 4 U"	Perfect Man	Chun Hyuk-jin
2002	"Wedding" (Korean: "너의 결혼식")	Wedding	
2002	"Poisoning (Deep Sorrow)"^{[B]} (Korean: "중독 (Deep Sorrow)")	Wedding	
2002	"Hero"	Summer Vacation in SMTown.com	
2003	"Young Gunz"	Winter Story	Chun Hyuk-jin
2003	"Thank You"	Winter Story	
2004	"Brand New"	Brand New	Lee Sang-gyu
2004	"Fever (Crazy)" (Korean: "열병 (Crazy)")	Brand New	Lee Cheol-ha
2004	"Oh!"	Brand New	
2004	"Angel"	Brand New	
2004	"2gether 4ever"	Brand New	
2004	"How Do I Say"	Winter Story 2004–2005	
2004	"Red String" + "Erase All of Time"^{[B]} (Korean: "천생연분" + "세월의 흔적 다 버리고")	Winter Story 2004–2005	Chun Hyuk-jin
2005	"Hey, Dude!"	Summer Story 2005	
2006	"Once in a Lifetime"	State of the Art	Cho Soo-hyeon
2006	"Throw My Fist"	State of the Art	Kim Kwang-seok
2006	"You're My Everything"	State of the Art	
2006	"We Have the Sun in Our Hearts"^{[B]} (Japanese: "僕らの心には太陽がある")	Inspiration #1	
2007	"Isn't It Beautiful"^{[B]} (Korean: "예쁘잖아")	Winter Story 2006–2007	
2007	"The Snowy Night"^{[B]} (Korean: "눈 오는 날")	Winter Story 2007	
2008	"Just One More Time..."^{[B]} (Korean: "다시 한번만...")	Volume 9	
2008	"Run"	Volume 9	Song Won-young
2008	"Evidence (Destiny of Love)"^{[B]} (Korean: "흔적 (Destiny of Love)")	Volume 9	
2012	"Venus"	The Return	Kim Kwang-seok
2012	"Venus" (dance version)	The Return	Kim Kwang-seok
2013	"This Love"	The Classic	Cho Soo-hyeon
2013	"This Love" (dance version)	The Classic	Cho Soo-hyeon
2015	"Memory"	We	
2015	"Sniper" (Korean: "표적")	We	Han Sa-min
2016	"Orange" (Korean: "오렌지")	Unchanging	
2017	"Touch" (Korean: "터치")	Unchanging	
2018	"Kiss Me Like That"	Heart	

== Video albums ==
=== Concert tour videos ===
Title	Details	Peak chart positions
Title	Details	JPN
First Live Concert: The First Mythology	Released: March 23, 2001 (KOR); Label: SM Entertainment, Taewon Entertainment (no catalog number); Format: VCD	—
Second Live Concert: The Everlasting Mythology	Released: August 5, 2003 (KOR); Label: SM Entertainment (SPD-1369); Format: VCD, DVD	—
Live & Surprise	Released February 26, 2003 (JPN); Label: Avex Trax (AVBD-18042); Format: DVD	^{[A]}
Winter Story Tour	Released: June 10, 2004 (KOR); Label: Good EMG, Tawon Access, Deok-seun Media (no catalog number); Format: DVD, VCD, VHS	^{[A]}
Winter Story Tour 2004–2005; Shinhwa Live in Seoul	Released: April 15, 2005 (KOR); Label: Good EMG, Candle Media (no catalog number); Format: DVD	^{[A]}
Tropical Summer Story Festival	Released: May 19, 2006 (KOR); Label: Good EMG, Daewon Digital Entertainment (no catalog number); Format: DVD	159
2006 Live: State of the Art; Asia Tour in Seoul	Released: November 21, 2006 (KOR); Label: Good EMG, Taewon Entertainment (no catalog number); Format: DVD	75
2006 Japan Tour; Inspiration #1 in Tokyo, Live at Budōkan	Released: March 14, 2007 (JPN); Label: Pony Canyon (PCBP-51766); Format: DVD + CD	25
Shinhwa 2007 Japan Tour; Shinhwa Forever	Released: March 19, 2008 (JPN); Label: Pony Canyon (PCBP-51549); Format: DVD	46
Shinhwa Must Go On; 10th Anniversary Live in Seoul	Released: November 6, 2008 (KOR); Label: Good EMG, Taewon Entertainment, IKPOP (DAWA-0001); Format: DVD	35
2012 Grand Tour in Seoul "The Return"	Released: December 26, 2012 (KOR); Label: Shinhwa Company, KBS (no catalog number); Format: DVD	71
15th Anniversary Concert "The Legend Continues"	Released: December 13, 2013 (KOR); Label: Shinhwa Company, KBS (no catalog number); Format: DVD	22
2013 Grand Finale "The Classic" in Seoul	Released: September 22, 2014 (KOR); Label: Liveworks, KBS (no catalog number); Format: DVD	17
"—" denotes releases that did not chart or were not released in that region.

=== Documentaries ===
Title	Details	Peak chart positions
Title	Details	JPN
6th Story	Released: May 9, 2003 (KOR); Label: SM Entertainment (no catalog number); Format: DVD	—
Brand New Story	Released: August 17, 2005 (KOR); Label: Good EMG, SBS, Candle Media (no catalog number); Format: DVD	92
Shinhwa Personal Histories	Released: August 22, 2005 (JPN); Label: Indies Maker, HCP (QNBS-9001); Format: DVD	109
Shinhwa: The Greatest Artist in 1998–2007	Released: June 27, 2008 (KOR); Label: MBC, Good EMG, Taewon Entertainment (no catalog number); Format: DVD	36
All About Shinhwa, From 1998 to 2008	Released: October 14, 2009 (KOR); Label: SBS, Good Entertainment, Ein's M&M (no catalog number); Format: DVD	47
The Return: Shinhwa 14th Anniversary Special DVD	Released: October 30, 2012 (KOR); Label: KBS Media, Shinhwa Company (no catalog number); Format: DVD	29
"—" denotes releases that did not chart or were not released in that region.

=== Music video compilations ===
Title	Details	Peak chart positions
Title	Details	JPN
Perfect Visual	Released: September 19, 2002 (JPN); Label: Avex Trax (AVBD-18038); Format: DVD	^{[A]}
Perfect Visual 2	Released: May 21, 2003 (JPN); Label: Avex Trax (AVBD-18046); Format: DVD	^{[A]}
2003–2007 Music Video Collection	Released: November 13, 2007 (KOR); Label: Good EMG (no catalog number); Format: DVD	105
"—" denotes releases that did not chart or were not released in that region.

== Notes ==
- A There are no publicly available records for Japan's Oricon chart prior to mid-2005.
- B These songs, originally titled in Korean, have no official English titles. Therefore, the translations provided here may differ from those in other sources.
