= List of awards and nominations received by Shinhwa =

Shinhwa awards and nominations
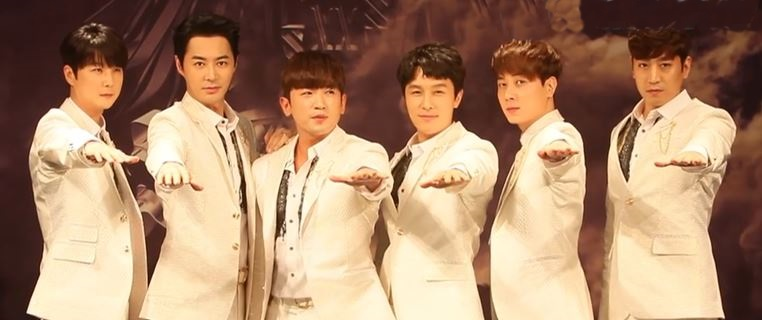
- Shinhwa in 2018
Awards and nominations
Award	Wins	Nominations
Golden Disc Awards	6	18
KBS Music Awards	2	2
KMTV Gayo Award	1	1
KMTV Song Award	2	2
Korea Fashion World Award	1	1
Japan Gold Disc Award	1	1
MBC Music Awards	1	1
Mnet 20's Choice Awards	2	4
Mnet Asian Music Awards	10	21
MTV Asia Awards	1	1
SBS Gayo Daejeon	6	9
Seoul Music Awards	5	9
South Korean Image Contest Award	1	1
Style Icon Awards	2	2

Totals (Note: Certain award groups do not simply award one winner. They acknowledge several different recipients, have runners-up, and have third place. Since this is a specific recognition and is different from losing an award, runner-up mentions are considered wins in this award tally. For simplification and to avoid errors, each award in this list has been presumed to have had a prior nomination.)
- Wins: 38
- Nominations: 72

This is a list of awards and nominations received by South Korean boy band Shinhwa. The group debuted on March 24, 1998, with six members: Eric, Lee Min-woo, Kim Dong-wan, Shin Hye-sung, Jun Jin, and Andy. Shinhwa was initially formed under SM Entertainment; however, it moved to Good Entertainment in July 2003, upon the expiration of their contract. Whilst under Good Entertainment as Shinhwa, each of the members pursued their own solo careers under individual companies.

In 2011, members of the group formed 'Shinhwa Company' to continue to perform together. They made their comeback to the music industry in March 2012, after a four-year hiatus, during which the band members served individual mandatory military services, with the release of their tenth album The Return and concert tour.

== Awards and nominations ==
Name of the award ceremony, year presented, category, nominee(s) of the award, and the result of the nomination
Award ceremony	Year	Category	Nominee / work	Result	Ref.
Golden Disc Awards	2001	Disc Bonsang	Hey, Come On!	Won	
Golden Disc Awards	2001	Disc Daesang	Hey, Come On!	Nominated	
Golden Disc Awards	2002	Disc Bonsang	Perfect Man and My Choice	Won	
Golden Disc Awards	2002	Disc Daesang	Perfect Man and My Choice	Nominated	
Golden Disc Awards	2003	Disc Bonsang	Wedding	Won	
Golden Disc Awards	2003	Disc Daesang	Wedding	Nominated	
Golden Disc Awards	2004	Disc Bonsang	Brand New	Won	
Golden Disc Awards	2004	Disc Daesang	Brand New	Nominated	
Golden Disc Awards	2006	Disc Bonsang	State of the Art	Won	
Golden Disc Awards	2006	Disc Daesang	State of the Art	Nominated	
Golden Disc Awards	2008	Disc Bonsang	Volume 9	Won	
Golden Disc Awards	2008	Disc Daesang	Volume 9	Nominated	
Golden Disc Awards	2008	Popularity Award	Shinhwa	Nominated	
Golden Disc Awards	2013	Disc Bonsang	The Return	Nominated	
Golden Disc Awards	2013	Popularity Award	The Return	Nominated	
Golden Disc Awards	2014	Song Award	The Classic	Nominated	
Golden Disc Awards	2014	Popularity Award	The Classic	Nominated	
Golden Disc Awards	2019	Popularity Award	Shinhwa	Nominated	
Japan Gold Disc Award	2007	The Best Asian Artists	Shinhwa	Won	
KBS Music Awards	2001	Bonsang	Shinhwa	Won	
KBS Music Awards	2004	Bonsang	Shinhwa	Won	
KMTV Gayo Award	2001	Popularity Award	Shinhwa	Won	
KMTV Song Award	2000	Bonsang	Shinhwa	Won	
KMTV Song Award	2000	Popular Singers	Shinhwa	Won	
Korea Fashion World Award	2004	Singer Section	Shinhwa	Won	
MBC Music Awards	2004	Bonsang	Shinhwa	Won	
Mnet 20's Choice Awards	2012	20's Performance	"Venus"	Nominated	
Mnet 20's Choice Awards	2013	20's Performance	"This Love"	Nominated	
Mnet 20's Choice Awards	2013	20's Voice	"This Love"	Won	
Mnet 20's Choice Awards	2013	20's Mwave Global Star	Shinhwa	Won	
Mnet Asian Music Awards	1999	Best Male Group	"T.O.P"	Nominated	
Mnet Asian Music Awards	2000	Best Dance Performance	"Only One"	Nominated	
Mnet Asian Music Awards	2001	Best Male Group	"Wild Eyes"	Won	
Mnet Asian Music Awards	2001	Best Dance Performance	"Wild Eyes"	Nominated	
Mnet Asian Music Awards	2002	Best Male Group	"Perfect Man"	Won	
Mnet Asian Music Awards	2002	Best Dance Performance	"Perfect Man"	Nominated	
Mnet Asian Music Awards	2003	Best Dance Performance	"Your Wedding"	Nominated	
Mnet Asian Music Awards	2003	Best Male Group	"Your Wedding"	Won	
Mnet Asian Music Awards	2003	Netizen Popularity Award	"Your Wedding"	Won	
Mnet Asian Music Awards	2004	Best Dance Performance	"Brand New"	Won	
Mnet Asian Music Awards	2004	Best Male Group Video	"Brand New"	Won	
Mnet Asian Music Awards	2004	Overseas Viewers' Award	"Brand New"	Won	
Mnet Asian Music Awards	2006	Album of the Year	State of the Art	Nominated	
Mnet Asian Music Awards	2006	Best Group	"Once In A Lifetime"	Nominated	
Mnet Asian Music Awards	2006	YEPP Netizen Popularity Award	"Once In A Lifetime"	Won	
Mnet Asian Music Awards	2006	Overseas Viewers' Award	"Once In A Lifetime"	Won	
Mnet Asian Music Awards	2007	Overseas Viewers' Award	Shinhwa	Won	
Mnet Asian Music Awards	2012	Best Male Group	"Venus"	Nominated	
Mnet Asian Music Awards	2012	Artist of the Year	Shinhwa	Nominated	
Mnet Asian Music Awards	2013	Best Male Group	Shinhwa	Nominated	
Mnet Asian Music Awards	2013	Artist of the Year	Shinhwa	Nominated	
MTV Asia Awards	2005	Favorite Korean Artist	Shinhwa	Won	
SBS Gayo Daejeon	2000	Popularity Award	Shinhwa	Won	
SBS Gayo Daejeon	2001	Bonsang	Hey, Come On!	Won	
SBS Gayo Daejeon	2001	Daesang	Hey, Come On!	Nominated	
SBS Gayo Daejeon	2003	Bonsang	Wedding	Won	
SBS Gayo Daejeon	2003	Daesang	Wedding	Nominated	
SBS Gayo Daejeon	2004	Bonsang	Brand New	Won	
SBS Gayo Daejeon	2004	Daesang	Brand New	Won	
SBS Gayo Daejeon	2006	Bonsang	State of the Art	Won	
SBS Gayo Daejeon	2006	Daesang	State of the Art	Nominated	
Seoul Music Awards	2002	Bonsang	Perfect Man	Won	
Seoul Music Awards	2002	Disk Daesang	Perfect Man	Nominated	
Seoul Music Awards	2003	Bonsang	Wedding	Won	
Seoul Music Awards	2003	Disk Daesang	Wedding	Nominated	
Seoul Music Awards	2004	Bonsang	Brand New	Won	
Seoul Music Awards	2004	Disk Daesang	Brand New	Won	
Seoul Music Awards	2004	Popularity Award	Brand New	Won	
Seoul Music Awards	2014	Bonsang	The Classic	Nominated	
Seoul Music Awards	2014	Popularity Award	The Classic	Nominated	
South Korean Image Contest Award	2004	Most Photogenic	Shinhwa	Won	
Style Icon Awards	2012	Worship-Worthy Idols	Shinhwa	Nominated	
Style Icon Awards	2013	10 Style Icons	Shinhwa	Nominated	

== See also ==
- K-pop
- Contemporary culture of South Korea
- Korean music
