= Yoo Young-jin =

South Korean singer and producer

- Born: Yoo Young-jin; April 10, 1971 (age 55); Gochang, South Korea
- Genres: K-pop; R&B; electropop; dance; experimental
- Occupations: Singer-songwriter; record producer; vocal trainer
- Years active: 1993–present
- Labels: SM; A2O

Korean name
- Hangul: 유영진
- RR: Yu Yeongjin
- MR: Yu Yŏngjin

Yoo Young-jin is a South Korean singer-songwriter, record producer and vocal trainer formerly under SM Entertainment. He has produced and written songs for H.O.T., S.E.S, BoA, Shinhwa, TVXQ, CSJH The Grace, Super Junior, Girls' Generation, Shinee, f(x), EXO, Red Velvet, NCT and aespa.

== Biography ==
Yoo Young-jin was born in Gochang, South Korea on April 10, 1971. He has two younger brothers and sisters. He was a graduate from Jeonju High School.

== Career ==
He started his singing career in 1993, with the release of his first EP, Blues in Rhythm single 1. Since then, he released a number of albums, one of them entitled Agape (2001), which is composed of 15 tracks featuring different artists under SM Entertainment.

From 1996, Yoo also became a prolific producer and composer for SM, starting with H.O.T.'s first album.

On March 15, 2023, it was reported that Yoo had officially left SM after 28 years under the company, as a result of the company's management transition.

== Music discography ==
=== Studio albums ===
- Blues in Rhythm Album (November 1993)
- Blue Rhythm (September 1996)
- ...지애(之愛) (Agape) (March 2001)

=== EP ===
- Blues in Rhythm single 1 (August 1993)

=== Collaboration singles ===
- "Tell Me (What Is Love)" by Yoo Young-jin x D.O., released on February 9, 2016
- "Cure" by Yoo Young-jin x Taeyong, released on August 5, 2017

== Production discography ==
=== Writer-producer ===
- September 2009: "Super Girl" – Super Girl by Super Junior-M
- December 2010: "Beautiful Girls" (bonus track) – Into the New World by Girls' Generation
- November 2020: "Black Mamba" by Aespa

=== Compositions ===
Release Date	Song Title	Singer	Album name	with
1996
09/07	"전사의 후예(폭력시대) (Warrior's Descendant)"	H.O.T.	We Hate All Kinds of Violence	—N/a
09/07	"너는 Fast 나는 Slow (You're Fast I'm Slow)"	H.O.T.	We Hate All Kinds of Violence	—N/a
09/07	"내가 필요할 때 (소년, 소녀 가장에게) (When You Need Me)"	H.O.T.	We Hate All Kinds of Violence	—N/a
1997
07/11	"Go! H.O.T!"	H.O.T.	Wolf and Sheep	—
07/11	"늑대와 양 (Wolf and Sheep)"	H.O.T.	Wolf and Sheep	—
07/11	"자유롭게 날 수 있도록 (Free to Fly)"	H.O.T.	Wolf and Sheep	—
07/11	"We Are the Future"	H.O.T.	Wolf and Sheep	—
07/11	"열등감 (The End of my Inferiority Complex)"	H.O.T.	Wolf and Sheep	—
11/01	"I'm Your Girl"	S.E.S.	I'm Your Girl	—
11/01	"완전한 이유"	S.E.S.	S.E.S.	—
1998
05/05	"해결사 (The Solver)"	Shinhwa	Resolver	—
05/05	"으쌰! 으쌰! (Eusha! Eusha!)"	Shinhwa	Resolver	—
09/09	"열맞춰! (Line up!)"	H.O.T.	Resurrection	Groovie K(Kim Sung-soo)
09/09	"우리들의 맹세 (The Promise of H.O.T)"	H.O.T.	Resurrection	—
11/27	"Shy Boy"	S.E.S.	Sea & Eugene & Shoo	—
1999
04/04	"T.O.P. (Twinkling of Paradise)"	Shinhwa	T.O.P	—
04/04	"악동보고서 (Yo!)"	Shinhwa	T.O.P	Groovie K(Kim Sung-soo)
09/15	"Iyah!"	H.O.T.	Iyah!	Groovie K
09/15	"The Way That You Like Me"	H.O.T.	Iyah!	Yoo Han-jin
11/27	"Twilight Zone"	S.E.S.	Love	—
11/27	"Love"	S.E.S.	Love	—
2000
03/27	"Only one"	Shinhwa	Only one	—
08/25	"ID; Peace B"	BoA	ID; Peace B	—
12/30	"Be Natural"	S.E.S.	A Letter from Greenland	—
12/30	"I Will..."	S.E.S.	A Letter from Greenland	—
2001				—
06/28	"Wild Eyes"	Shinhwa	Hey, Come On!	—
12/04	"Angel Eyes"	SM Town	Christmas Winter Vacation in SMTown.com – Angel Eyes	—
2002
03/29	"Perfect Man"	Shinhwa	Perfect Man	—
12/27	"Neoui Gyeolhonsik (Wedding)"	Shinhwa	Wedding	—
12/27	"중독 (Deep Sorrow)"	Shinhwa	Wedding	—
12/27	"Hiway (Ride With Me)"	Shinhwa	Wedding	—
04/06	"Sea of Love"	Fly to the Sky	Sea of Love	—
04/06	"Sea of Love (Fany Ver.)"	Hwanhee	Sea of Love	—
2003
10/01	"길들이기 (Friend VS Lover)"	Dana	남겨둔 이야기	—
2004
10/13	"Tri-Angle"	TVXQ ft. BoA & TRAX	Tri-Angle	Groovie K(Kim Sung-soo)
10/13	"Million Men"	TVXQ	Tri-Angle	—
2005
06/23	"Girls on Top"	BoA	Girls on Top	—
09/05	"Rising Sun" (순수)	TVXQ	Rising Sun	—
09/05	"Dangerous Mind"	TVXQ	Rising Sun	—
11/06	"Twins (Knock Out)"	Super Junior	Twins	Yoo Han-jin
2006
05/19	"Scandal"	Kangta & Vanness	Scandal	Yoo Han-jin
05/19	"Good Vibration"	Kangta & Vanness	Scandal	—
06/01	"동방의 투혼 (Fighting Spirit of Dong Bang)"	TVXQ	Fighting Spirit of Dong Bang	
07/28	"Beautiful Thing"	TVXQ (Xiah Junsu)	극장드라마 Vacation OST	
09/02	""O"-正.反.合. ("O"-Jung.Ban.Hap.)"	TVXQ	"O"-Jung.Ban.Hap.	
11/03	"My Everything"	The Grace	My Everything	
2007
05/04	"女友 (그녀들의 수다) Girlfriends (Their Talking)"	The Grace	One More Time, OK?	
05/04	"RENEW"	The Grace	One More Time, OK?	
09/20	"Don't Don"	Super Junior	Don't Don	Groovie K(Kim Sung-soo)
09/20	"갈증 (A Man In Love)"	Super Junior	Don't Don (Repackage)	
2008
01/15	"Purple Line"	TVXQ	Purple Line	
03/03	"Star Wish (I Will)"	Zhang Liyin	I Will	
03/03	"One More Try"	Zhang Liyin	I Will	
09/26	"HEY! (Don't Bring Me Down)"	TVXQ	MIROTIC	
09/26	"악녀 (Are You a Good Girl?)"	TVXQ	MIROTIC	
09/01	"The Shinee World (Doo-Bop)"	SHINee	The Shinee World	
10/21	"Neo Animyeon Andoeneun Geol (Romantic)"	SHINee	The Shinee World (Repackage)	
2009
03/12	"Sorry, Sorry"	Super Junior	Sorry, Sorry	
03/17	"Girls on Top"	BoA	BoA	
06/29	"Tell Me Your Wish"	Girls' Generation	Tell Me Your Wish	
09/14	"Super Girl"	Super Junior-M	Super Girl	
10/22	"Ring Ding Dong"	SHINee	2009, Year of Us	
12/14	"Sorry, Sorry-Answer"	Super Junior	The 2nd Asia Tour Concert : Super Show 2	
2010
05/10	"미인아 (BONAMANA)"	Super Junior	Bonamana	
07/19	"Lucifer"	SHINee	Lucifer	Ryan S. Jhun, Adam Kapi, Bebe Rexha
09/13	"Breaka Shaka"	Kangta	The First Digital Single	
11/29	"Hot Times"	SM The Ballad	SM The Ballad Vol. 1	
2011
01/11	"왜 (Keep Your Head Down)"	TVXQ	Keep Your Head Down	Yoo Han-jin
01/11	"Maximum"	TVXQ	Keep Your Head Down	
03/16	"이것만은 알고가 독백 (Before U Go – Monologue)"	TVXQ	Keep Your Head Down (Repackage)	
03/16	"이것만은 알고가 (Before U Go)"	TVXQ	Keep Your Head Down (Repackage)	
08/01	"Mr. Simple"	Super Junior	Mr. Simple	
08/22	"Superman"	Super Junior	Mr. Simple	
09/28	"B.U.T"	TVXQ	Tone	Antwann Frost, Ryan S. Jhun
2012
01/30	"What Is Love"	EXO	Mama	Teddy Riley, Dom, Richard Garcia
03/09	"History"	EXO	Mama	Mikkel Remee Sigvardt, Thomas Troelsen
04/08	"Mama"	EXO	Mama	
07/04	"From U"	Super Junior	Sexy, Free & Single	
09/24	"Catch Me"	TVXQ	Catch Me	
10/31	"Maxstep"	Younique Unit	PYL Younique Volume 1	
2013
01/01	"I GOT A BOY"	Girls' Generation	I Got a Boy	Will Simms, Anne Judith Wik, Sarah Lundback
01/16	"Catch Me"	TVXQ	TIME	
2014
01/06	"Something"	TVXQ	TENSE	
02/27	"Spellbound"	TVXQ	Spellbound	
12/22	"Tell Me What Is Love (D.O.)"	EXO	Exology Chapter 1: The Lost Planet	
2015
07/20	"너는 내꺼 (Top of The World)"	TVXQ	Rise as God	
2016
01/20	"One Day One Chance"	Max Changmin, f(Luna), Suho, Key, Xiumin, 조은	School OZ – Hologram Musical O.S.T	Nermin Harambasic, Robin Jenssen, Ronny Svendsen, Anne Judith Wik
02/18	"Tell Me (What Is Love)"	Yoo, Young Jin x D.O.	SM Station Season 1	
11/15	"Tell Me What To Do"	SHINee	1 and 1	Mike Daley, Mitchell Owens, Dewain Whitmore, Patrick `J. Que` Smith
11/27	"Love [story]"	S.E.S	SM Station Season 1 / Remember	
2017
01/02	"한 폭의 그림 (Paradise)"	S.E.S	Remember	Mike Daley, Mitchell Owens
08/05	"함께 (Cure)"	Yoo Young-jin x Taeyong	S.M. Station Season 2	Yoo Han-jin
09/25	"Drop"	U-know Yunho	S.M. Station Season 2	—
12/27	"Dear My Family"	SMTOWN	S.M. Station Season 2	Yoo Han-jin, Yoo Chang-young
2018
01/29	"Bad Boy"	Red Velvet	The Perfect Red Velvet	Maxx Song, The Stereotypes, Whitney Phillips
02/20	"EVERYBODY KNOWS"	BoA	One Shot, Two Shot	Afshin Salmani, Josh Cumbee, Sara Forsberg
02/20	"내가 돌아 (NEGA DOLA)"	BoA	One Shot, Two Shot	Devine Channel, Ryan Henderson, Richard Beynon, Aurora Pfeiffer, Lena Leon
03/14	"BOSS"	NCT U	NCT 2018 Empathy	Mike Daley, Mitchell Owens, Tiffany Fred, Patrick 'J. Que' Smith
03/14	"Baby Don't Stop"	NCT U	NCT 2018 Empathy	Matt Schwartz, Paul Harris, Little Nikki, Ryan S. Jhun
03/14	"GO"	NCT Dream	NCT 2018 Empathy	The Stereotypes, Tiffany Fred, Sophiya, Distract
03/14	"OUTRO: VISION"	NCT U	NCT 2018 Empathy	—
03/28	"운명 (The Chance of Love)"	TVXQ	New Chapter No. 1: The Chance of Love	Jihad Rahmouni, Lorenzo Fragola, Haris Alagic
04/10	"花요일 (Blooming Day)"	Exo-CBX	Blooming Days	Steve Manovski, Jenson Vaughan, Caroline Ailin, Jordan Croucher
04/10	"Playdate"	Exo-CBX	Blooming Days	Andreas ÖbergY, Martin Kleveland, Ilanguaq David Lumholt
09/10	"데리러 가 (Good Evening)"	Shinee	The Story of Light: Epilogue	Chaz Mishan, David Delazyn, Bryan Jackson, Arnold Hennings, Daron Jones, Michael Keith, Quinnes Parker, Marvin Scandrick, Courtney Sills
09/10	"네가 남겨둔 말 (Our Page)"	Shinee	The Story of Light: Epilogue	Mike Woods, Kevin White, Andrew Bazzi
09/10	"I Want You"	Shinee	The Story of Light: Epilogue	Mike Woods, Kevin White, Andrew Bazzi, MZMC, Tay Jasper, 에스나 (eSNa)
10/12	"Regular (Korean Ver.)"	NCT 127	Regular-Irregular	Mike Daley, Mitchell Owens, Wilbart 'Vedo' McCoy III, George Kranz
11/23	"Simon Says"	NCT 127	Regulate	진바이진, Ronny Svendsen, Anne Judith Wik, Bobii Lewis
11/30	"Butterflies"	Red Velvet	RBB	Harvey Mason Jr., Michael Wyckoff, Joshua Golden, Patrick 'J. Que' Smith, Dewain Whitmore, Britt Burton
2020
11/17	"Black Mamba"	Aespa	Black Mamba	Omega, Ella Isaacson, Gabriela Geneva (NIIVA), Jordan Reyes, Shaun Lopez, Scott Chesak
12/01	"Better"	BoA	Better	Aston Hardacre, Awa Santesson Sey, Kusi Kwaku
2021
02/05	"Forever"	Aespa	Forever	—
03/16	"House Party"	Super Junior	The Renaissance	Christian Fast, Didrik Thott, Sebastian Thott
04/12	"Atlantis"	Shinee	Atlantis	Matt Thomson, Max Graham, James F. Reynolds, Gabriel Brandes, Britt Pols, Engelina Larsen, 창모
05/10	"Hot Sauce"	NCT Dream	Hot Sauce	Martin Wave, Tinashe Sibanda, Philip Kembo, Rosina 'Soaky Siren' Russell, John Mitchell, Ninos Hanna
05/17	"Next Level"	Aespa	Next Level	Mario Marchetti, Adam McInnis, Sophie Curtis
09/17	"Sticker"	NCT 127	Sticker	Dem Jointz, Calixte, Prince Chapelle, Ryan S. Jhun
10/05	"Aenergy"	Aespa	Savage	Kill Dave, Pat Morrissey, Jess Corazza
10/05	"Savage"	Aespa	Savage	Kirsten Collins, Jia Lih, Hautboi Rich
2022
01/03	"Step Back"	GOT the beat	Step Back	Dem Jointz, Taylor Monet Parks, Ryan S. Jhun
01/13	"Fever"	Max Changmin	Devil	
07/08	"Girls"	aespa	Girls	Hanif Sabzevari (Hitmanic), Dennis "DeKo" Kordnejad (Hitmanic), Rodnae "Chikk" Bell, Pontus PJ Ljung, Ryan S. Jhun
10/04	"28 Reasons"	Seulgi	28 Reasons	Johan Fransson, Henrik Göranson, Sean Kennedy
2024
12/20	"Under My Skin"	A2O MAY	Under My Skin	Thomas Troelsen, Lucas Secon, Sarah Connor, Remee

=== Lyrics ===
Release Date	Song Title	Singer	Album name
1996-09-07	"전사의 후예(폭력시대) (Warrior's Descendant)"	H.O.T.	We Hate All Kinds of Violence
1996-09-07	"너는 Fast 나는 Slow (You're Fast I'm Slow)"	H.O.T.	We Hate All Kinds of Violence
1996-09-07	"내가 필요할 때 (소년, 소녀 가장에게) (When You Need Me)"	H.O.T.	We Hate All Kinds of Violence
1997-07-11	"Go! H.O.T!"	H.O.T.	Wolf and Sheep
1997-07-11	"늑대와 양 (Wolf and Sheep)"	H.O.T.	Wolf and Sheep
1997-07-11	"자유롭게 날 수 있도록 (Free to Fly)"	H.O.T.	Wolf and Sheep
1997-07-11	"We Are the Future"	H.O.T.	Wolf and Sheep
1997-07-11	"열등감 (The End of my Inferiority Complex)"	H.O.T.	Wolf and Sheep
1997-11-01	"I'm Your Girl"	S.E.S.	I'm Your Girl
1997-11-01	"완전한 이유"	S.E.S.	S.E.S.
1997-11-01	"그대의 향기"	S.E.S.	S.E.S.
1998-05-05	"해결사 (The Solver)"	Shinhwa	Resolver
1998-05-05	"으쌰! 으쌰! (Eusha! Eusha!)"	Shinhwa	Resolver
1998-05-05	"천일유혼 (Sharing Forever)"	Shinhwa	Resolver
1998-09-09	"열맞춰! (Line up!)"	H.O.T.	Resurrection
1998-11-27	"Shy Boy"	S.E.S.	Sea & Eugene & Shoo
1998-11-27	"Dreams Come True"	S.E.S.	Sea & Eugene & Shoo
1999-04-04	"악동보고서 (Yo!)"	Shinhwa	T.O.P
1999-04-04	"T.O.P. (Twinkling of Paradise)"	Shinhwa	T.O.P
1999-04-04	"Iyah!"	H.O.T.	Iyah!
1999-04-15	"The Way That You Like Me"	H.O.T.	Iyah!
1999-11-27	"Twilight Zone"	S.E.S.	Love
1999-11-27	"Love"	S.E.S.	Love
2000-05-27	"Only One"	Shinhwa	Only One
2000-05-27	"Jam #1"	Shinhwa	Only One
2000-05-27	"너의 결혼식 (Wedding March)"	Shinhwa	Only One
2000-08-25	"ID; Peace B"	BoA	ID; Peace B
2000-12-30	"Be Natural"	S.E.S.	A Letter from Greenland
2000-12-30	"I Will..."	S.E.S.	A Letter from Greenland
2001-06-28	"Hey, Come On!"	Shinhwa	Hey, Come On!
2001-06-28	"Wild Eyes"	Shinhwa	Hey, Come On!
2001-12-04	"Angel Eyes"	SM Town	Christmas Winter Vacation in SMTown.com – Angel Eyes
2002-03-13	"Don't Start Now"	BoA	Listen to My Heart
2002-03-29	"Perfect Man"	Shinhwa	Perfect Man
2002-12-26	"중독 (Deep Sorrow)"	Shinhwa	Wedding
2002-12-26	"Hiway (Ride With Me)"	Shinhwa	Wedding
2003-10-01	"길들이기 (Friend VS Lover)"	Dana	남겨둔 이야기
2004-10-13	"Tri-Angle"	TVXQ ft. BoA & TRAX	Tri-Angle
2004-10-13	"Million Men"	TVXQ	Tri-Angle
2005-06-23	"Girls on Top"	BoA	Girls on Top
2005-09-05	"Tonight"	TVXQ	Rising Sun
2005-09-05	"Rising Sun" (순수)	TVXQ	Rising Sun
2005-09-05	"Dangerous Mind"	TVXQ	Rising Sun
2005-12-05	"Twins (Knock Out)"	Super Junior	SuperJunior05 (Twins)
2006-05-19	"Scandal" (Korean Version)	Kangta & Vanness	Scandal
2006-05-19	"Good Vibration" (Korean Version)	Kangta & Vanness	Scandal
2006-06-01	"동방의 투혼 (Fighting Spirit of Dong Bang)"	TVXQ	Fighting Spirit of Dong Bang
2006-07-06	"U"	Super Junior	U
2006-07-28	"Beautiful Thing"	TVXQ (Xiah Junsu)	극장드라마 Vacation OST
2006-09-02	""O"-正.反.合. ("O"-Jung.Ban.Hap.)"	TVXQ	"O"-Jung.Ban.Hap.
2006-09-02	"Hey, Girl"	TVXQ	"O"-Jung.Ban.Hap.
2006-11-03	"My Everything"	The Grace	My Everything
2007-05-04	"女友 (그녀들의 수다) Girlfriends (Their Talking)"	The Grace	One More Time, OK?
2007-05-04	"RENEW"	The Grace	One More Time, OK?
2007-09-20	"Don't Don"	Super Junior	Don't Don
2007-09-20	"갈증 (A Man In Love)"	Super Junior	Don't Don (Repackage)
2008-01-15	"Purple Line"	TVXQ	Purple Line
2008-03-03	"Star Wish (I Will)"	Zhang Liyin	I Will
2008-03-03	"One More Try"	Zhang Liyin	I Will
2008-09-26	"HEY! (Don't Bring Me Down)"	TVXQ	MIROTIC
2008-09-26	"악녀 (Are You a Good Girl?)"	TVXQ	MIROTIC
2008-10-01	"The Shinee World (Doo-Bop)"	SHINee	The Shinee World
2008-10-21	"아.미.고 (Amigo)"	SHINee	The Shinee World (Repackage)
2008-10-21	"Neo Animyeon Andoeneun Geol (Romantic)"	SHINee	The Shinee World (Repackage)
2009-06-22	"Tell Me Your Wish (Genie)"	Girls' Generation	Tell Me Your Wish (Genie)
2009-03-12	"Sorry, Sorry"	Super Junior	Sorry, Sorry
2009-09-14	"Super Girl" (Korean Version)	Super Junior-M	Super Girl
2009-10-22	"Ring Ding Dong"	SHINee	2009, Year of Us
2009-12-14	"Sorry, Sorry-Answer"	Super Junior	The 2nd Asia Tour Concert : Super Show 2
2010-05-03	"NU 예삐오 (Nu ABO)"	f(x)	Nu ABO
2010-05-10	"미인아 (BONAMANA)"	Super Junior	Bonamana
2010-07-19	"Lucifer"	SHINee	Lucifer
2010-11-29	"Hot Times"	SM The Ballad	SM The Ballad Vol. 1
2011-01-11	"왜 (Keep Your Head Down)"	TVXQ	Keep Your Head Down
2011-01-11	"Maximum"	TVXQ	Keep Your Head Down
2011-03-16	"이것만은 알고가 독백 (Before U Go – Monologue)"	TVXQ	Keep Your Head Down (Repackage)
2011-03-16	"이것만은 알고가 (Before U Go)"	TVXQ	Keep Your Head Down (Repackage)
2011-08-01	"Mr. Simple"	Super Junior	Mr. Simple
2011-08-01	"Superman"	Super Junior	Mr. Simple
2011-10-19	The Boys (Korean Version)	Girls' Generation	The Boys
2012-09-24	"Catch Me"	TVXQ	"Catch Me"
2012-10-31	"Maxstep"	Younique Unit	PYL Younique Volume 1
2013-01-01	"I GOT A BOY"	Girls' Generation	I Got a Boy
2014-08-04	"행복(Happiness)"	Red Velvet	"행복(Happiness) Digital Single"
2018-03-14	"Boss"	NCT	NCT 2018 Empathy
2018-03-28	"운명 (The Chance of Love)"	TVXQ	New Chapter No. 1: The Chance of Love
2018-11-02	"Tempo"	EXO	Don't Mess Up My Tempo
2024-12-20	"Under My Skin"	A2O MAY	Under My Skin

=== Arrangements ===
Release Date	Song Title	Singer	Album name	with
2000
05/27	"너의 결혼식 (Wedding March)"	Shinhwa	Only One	
08/25	"ID; Peace B"	BoA	ID; Peace B	
2001
06/28	"Hey, Come On!"	Shinhwa	Hey, Come On!	
2002
03/13	"Don't Start Now"	BoA	Listen to My Heart	
2005
06/23	"Girls on Top"	BoA	Girls on Top	
12/05	"Twins (Knock Out)"	Super Junior	SuperJunior05 (Twins)	
2006
07/06	"U"	Super Junior	U	
09/02	""O"-正.反.合. ("O"-Jung.Ban.Hap.)"	TVXQ	"O"-Jung.Ban.Hap.	
2008
04/08	"U"	Super Junior-M	Me	
05/23	"누난 너무 예뻐 (Replay) (Noona, You're So Pretty (Replay))"	SHINee	Replay	
11/29	"Hot Times"	SM The Ballad	SM The Ballad Vol. 1	
2011
01/11	"왜 (Keep Your Head Down)"	TVXQ	Keep Your Head Down	
01/11	"Maximum"	TVXQ	Keep Your Head Down	
03/16	"이것만은 알고가 독백 (Before U Go – Monologue)"	TVXQ	Keep Your Head Down (Repackage)	
03/16	"이것만은 알고가 (Before U Go)"	TVXQ	Keep Your Head Down (Repackage)	
08/01	"Mr. Simple"	Super Junior	Mr. Simple	
08/01	"Superman"	Super Junior	Mr. Simple	
2012
07/01	"Sexy, Free & Single"	Super Junior	Sexy, Free & Single	
2014
12/22	"Tell Me What Is Love (D.O.)"	EXO	Exology Chapter 1: The Lost Planet	
2016
04/10	"Without You"	NCT U	"Without You" digital single	
2017
01/02	"그대로부터 세상 빛은 시작되고 (The Light)"	S.E.S	Remember	
06/14	"Cherry Bomb"	NCT 127	Cherry Bomb	
2018
06/18	"Something New"	Taeyeon	Something New	
2020
01/15	"Dear Me"	Taeyeon	Purpose (Repackage)	
06/09	"Turn Back Time (超时空 回)"	WayV	Awaken the World	
07/06	"Monster"	Red Velvet – Irene & Seulgi	Monster	
2024
12/6	"CANDY"	A2O LTB Rookies	Candy	COACH & SENDO
12/6	"Melody"	A2O HTG Rookies	Melody	Royal Dive, Zayson
12/20	"Under My Skin"	A2O MAY	Under My Skin	
2025
4/25	"BOSS"	A2O MAY	BOSS	JOACHIM RYGG
8/15	"B.B.B (Bigger Badder Better)"	A2O MAY ft. A2O LTG	B.B.B (Bigger Badder Better)	Moonshine
10/24	"Trip"	A2O MAY (SHIJIE)	PAPARAZZI ARRIVE	
