= T.O.P. (Shinhwa album) =

Studio album by Shinhwa
- Released: April 15, 1999
- Recorded: 1999
- Studio: SM Digital Recording Studio (Seoul)
- Genre: K-pop
- Language: Korean
- Label: SM

Shinhwa chronology
Resolver (1998)	T.O.P. (1999)	Only One (2000)

Singles from T.O.P.
- 1. "T.O.P." Released: April 15, 1999; 2. "Yo!" Released: April 15, 1999

T.O.P. is the second Korean studio album by South Korean boy band Shinhwa. It was released on April 15, 1999, by SM Entertainment. The album title T.O.P. stands for Twinkling Of Paradise. The album spawned two singles: the title track "T.O.P. (Twinkling of Paradise)", which incorporated elements of Tchaikovsky's "Swan Lake", and "Yo!". The album saw greater levels of success in comparison to their debut album Resolver (1998), selling over 377,000 copies in 1999. Both of its singles ranked atop the music program charts for multiple weeks.

== Reception ==
The album garnered much success, climbing the charts quickly (debuting at number four and peaking at number three on the MIAK monthly album chart). Although they promoted their first album well, Shinhwa did not do many promotions for their second album, and instead began working on their third album. Despite the lack of promotions, the single "T.O.P." was a success, and spent 24 weeks on the charts before it dropped. "T.O.P." represented Shinhwa's first significant commercial success and was noted for its use of Tchaikovsky's "Swan Lake" music.

SM Entertainment labelmate S.E.S. released a cover of "T.O.P. (Twinkling of Paradise)" as their fourth Japanese single on October 27, 1999. Years after its original release, "T.O.P." has been performed on television with its original choreography by groups such as Girls' Generation, Spica, Super Junior, and BTS.

== Music video ==
The music video for "T.O.P." shows the six Shinhwa members in white suits with a bright fantasy-like back-drop. The music video for "Yo!" tells the story of vocalist Lee Minwoo, as a trouble-maker boy who falls in love with a girl, played by Kim Bo-mi.

== Accolades ==
The second single "Yo!" collected seven number one wins on live music programs, a record it held until "This Love" from their eleventh album The Classic, won eight first place wins in 2013. This record was broken again by "Sniper" from their twelfth album We, which won ten first place wins in 2015.

In 2021, Melon and Seoul Shinmun ranked "T.O.P. (Twinkling of Paradise)" number 81 in their list of the Top 100 K-pop Songs of All Time. Critic Park Hee-ah called it a main prototype of how "idols can freely embrace any genre of music, can generate great interest by twisting existing perspectives, and can also provide fun in interpreting the narratives hidden in albums or songs. In other words, 'T.O.P.' was a track that contained all the factors that has helped made K-pop popular these days."

Music program awards
Song	Program	Date
"T.O.P."	Music Bank	June 8, 1999
"T.O.P."	Music Bank	June 22, 1999
"T.O.P."	Music Bank	June 29, 1999
"T.O.P."	Music Camp	June 26, 1999
"T.O.P."	Inkigayo	July 4, 1999
"T.O.P."	Inkigayo	July 18, 1999
"Yo!"	Music Bank	July 13, 1999
"Yo!"	Music Bank	July 20, 1999
"Yo!"	Music Bank	July 27, 1999
"Yo!"	Music Bank	August 10, 1999
"Yo!"	Music Bank	August 24, 1999
"Yo!"	Inkigayo	August 15, 1999
"Yo!"	Inkigayo	August 22, 1999

== Track listing ==
No.	Title	Lyrics	Music	Arrangement	Length
1.	"Intro"	Eric Mun	Park Seong-soo	Park Seong-soo	0:45
2.	"Yo! (Brat Report)" (Korean: Yo! (악동보고서))	Yoo Young-jin	Yoo Young-jin, Kim Seong-soo(Groovie.K)	Yoo Young-jin	3:45
3.	"T.O.P. (Twinkling of Paradise)"	Yoo Young-jin, Eric Mun	Yoo Young-jin	Yoo Young-jin	4:37
4.	"Cycle" (Korean: 원)	Kim Myeong-jik, Eric Mun	Kim Myeong-jik	Oh Han-song	4:00
5.	"Nothing"	Kim Dong-hyeon, Eric Mun	Park Seong-soo	Park Seong-soo	3:40
6.	"Breakin' the Silence" (Korean: 침묵을 깨고)	Park Eun-hee, Eric Mun	Park Hae-woon		3:37
7.	"Desire" (Korean: 소망)	Lee Jae-kyeong, Eric Mun	Im Ki-hoon		4:03
8.	"To. G"	Kim Dong-wan, Eric Mun	Kim Dong-wan	Kim Dong-wan	3:49
9.	"Grief" (Korean: 푸리)	Kim Dong-wan, Eric Mun, Lee Min-woo	Kim Dong-wan	Kim Dong-wan	3:02
10.	"Return"	Kim Dong-hyeon, Eric Mun	Park Seong-soo	Park Seong-soo	3:59
11.	"Forever with You" (Korean: 너의 곁에서)	Shin Hye-sung, Eric Mun	Shin In-soo		3:55
12.	"T.O.P." ((Extended Version))	Yoo Young-jin, Eric Mun	Yoo Young-jin	Yoo Young-jin	4:22
13.	"T.O.P." ((Edit Version))	Yoo Young-jin, Eric Mun	Yoo Young-jin	Yoo Young-jin	3:35

== Credits and personnel ==
Credits are adapted from the album liner notes.

Shinhwa

- Eric Mun – main rap, chorus
- Andy Lee – rap, chorus
- Lee Min-woo – sub vocal, chorus
- Jun Jin – lead rap, chorus
- Kim Dong-wan – sub vocal, chorus
- Shin Hye-seong – main vocal, chorus

T.O.P. duet

- Jun Jin – lead rap, chorus
- Kim Dong-wan – sub vocal, chorus

Session

- Groovie K – electric guitar (2, 5, 10)
- Taeyoon Lee – bass guitar (2, 5)
- Yoo Young-jin – chorus (2)
- S.E.S. – chorus (2)
- Oh Hansol – electric guitar (4)
- Hyosoo Kim, Yuna Shin – chorus (4)
- Seongsu Park – various instruments / sequencer / chorus (5)
- Borana Kim – chorus (5, 10)
- Geun-hyung Lee – electric guitar (6, 11)
- Park Ki-ho – chorus (6)
- Sam Lee – electric guitar (7)
- Shin Hyeon-kwon – bass guitar (7)
- Lim Ki-hoon – chorus (7)
- Dongwan Kim – electric guitar (8~9)
- Hyunah Kim, Jihwan Moon – chorus (11)

Staff

- Lee Soo-man – executive producer
- KAT, Younghoon Kim, Duhyeon Yeo – recording, mixing
- Jeon Hoon (BLS), Hong Hyun-ah – mastering
- Kyungwook Kim – production
  - Kim Ki-beom, Lee Soo-yong, Park Kwon-young, Jeong Yu-jin, Choi Yun-jeong – production assistant
- Jeong Hae-ik – manager
- Lee Min-woo, Jun Jin – choreography
- Seong Moon-seok, Kim Eun-ah, Choi Mi-sook, Lee Sang-hee – stylist
- Seonyoung Shim – photography
- Seunggyu Kook – album design
- Myungjin Art Co., Ltd. – printing
- SM Entertainment – executive producer

== Charts and sales ==
=== Monthly charts ===
Chart (May 1999)	Peak position
South Korean Albums (RIAK)	3

=== Sales ===
Region	Sales
South Korea (RIAK)	377,500

== Release history ==
Country	Date	Distributing label	Format
South Korea	May 5, 1999	SM Entertainment, Synnara Records	CD (KSC-9014)
Japan	September 19, 2001	Avex Trax	CD (AVCD-18016)
