= PYL Younique Volume 1 =

Single album by SM Town
- Released: December 2012 (South Korea)
- Recorded: 2012
- Studios: SM Booming System; SM Yellow Tail Studio; Ingrid Studio
- Genre: Dance
- Length: 9:42
- Language: Korean
- Labels: SM; KMP
- Producers: Lee Soo-man (exec.); Will Simms; Stella Attar; Marissa Renee Shipp; Toby Gad; Yoo Young-jin

Singles from PYL Younique Volume 1
- 1. "Lookin'" Released: October 16, 2012; 2. "My Lifestyle" Released: October 18, 2012; 3. "Maxstep" Released: October 31, 2012

Music video
- "Maxstep" on YouTube

PYL Younique Volume 1 is a single album by SM Town released in December 2012. It is the first collaboration project between the auto-mobile manufacturing company Hyundai and the record label agency SM Entertainment, both headquartered in Seoul, South Korea.

The single album contains three previously released digital singles from October 2012: "Lookin'" by BoA featuring The Quiett, "My Lifestyle" by Girls' Generation's Jessica Jung featuring Dok2, and "Maxstep" by Younique Unit, which includes Super Junior's Eunhyuk, Girls' Generation's Hyoyeon, Shinee's Taemin, Super Junior-M's Henry, Exo-K's Kai and Exo-M's Luhan.

== PYL ==
PYL is a Hyundai Motor Company marketing project; meaning Premium Younique Lifestyle. The cars that are associated with it are the Hyundai Veloster, Hyundai i30 and the Hyundai i40.

PYL Younique Volume 1, the collaborative music album created by Hyundai and the record label agency SM Entertainment, was released physically as part of a promotional giveaway from December 2012 to January 2013.

== Track listing ==
No.	Title	Lyrics	Music	Arrangement	Length
1.	"Lookin'" (BoA featuring The Quiett)	Junggigo; The Quiett	Stella Attar; Will Simms	Stella Attar; Will Simms	2:49
2.	"My Lifestyle" (Jessica featuring Dok2)	Dok2; Soulful Monster	Toby Gad; Marissa Renee Shipp	Toby Gad; Marissa Renee Shipp	3:06
3.	"Maxstep" (Younique Unit)	Yoo Young-jin	Yoo Young-jin	Yoo Young-jin	3:47
Total length:					9:42

== Chart performance ==
Release date	Single	Artist	Peak positions		Ref.
Release date	Single	Artist	KOR	KOR	Ref.
Release date	Single	Artist	Gaon	Billboard	Ref.
October 16, 2012	"Lookin'"	BoA feat. The Quiett	19	44	
October 18, 2012	"My Lifestyle"	Jessica feat. Dok2	34	30	
October 31, 2012	"Maxstep"	Younique Unit	228	—	

== Credits and personnel ==
Credits adapted from album's liner notes.

Studio

- Ingrid Studio – recording, mixing (all tracks)
- SM Yellow Tail Studio – recording, mixing (track 1)
- SM Booming System – recording, mixing (track 3)
- SM Blue Ocean Studio – mixing (track 2)
- Sonic Korea – mastering (all tracks)

Personnel

- SM Entertainment – executive producer
- Lee Soo-man – producer
- BoA – vocals, background vocals (track 1)
- Jessica – vocals, background vocals (track 2)
- Younique Unit – vocals (track 3)
- The Quiett – vocals, lyrics (track 1)
- Junggigo – lyrics (track 1)
- Stella Attar – producer, composition, arrangement (track 1)
- Will Simms – producer, composition, arrangement (track 1)
- Dok2 – vocals, lyrics (track 2)
- Soulful Monster – lyrics (track 2)
- Toby Gad – producer, composition, arrangement (track 2)
- Marissa Renee Shipp – producer, composition, arrangement (track 2)
- Yoo Young-jin – producer, lyrics, composition, arrangement, background vocals, recording, mixing (track 3)
- Taesung Kim – vocal directing, recording (track 1–2)
- Kenzie – vocal directing (track 3)
- Jung Eun-kyung – recording (track 2–3), digital editing (all tracks)
- Kim Ji-eun – recording (track 1–2)
- Koo Jong-pil – recording, mixing (track 1)
- Lee Seong-ho – mixing (track 2)
- Jeon Hoon – mastering (all tracks)
