= Only One (Shinhwa album) =

- Only One cover

Studio album by Shinhwa
- Released: May 27, 2000
- Recorded: 2000
- Studio: SM Studios (Seoul)
- Genre: K-pop
- Language: Korean
- Label: SM

Shinhwa chronology
T.O.P. (1999)	Only One (2000)	Hey, Come On! (2001)

Singles from Only One
- 1. "Only One" Released: May 27, 2000; 2. "All Your Dreams" Released: May 27, 2000; 3. "First Love" Released: May 27, 2000; 4. "Wedding March (Your Side)" Released: May 27, 2000

Only One is the third Korean studio album by the South Korean boy band Shinhwa. It was released on May 27, 2000, by SM Entertainment. The album was delayed three months to give SM Entertainment's new group at the time, Fly to the Sky a chance to debut. The album's title song was released as the lead single, with "All Your Dreams", "First Love", and "Wedding March (Your Side)" being subsequent singles. Only One sold 423,873 copies and reached number one on the Recording Industry Association Korea music chart.

== Music videos ==
In the music video for "Only One", the members can be seen dancing in a dark warehouse. They can be seen wearing various clothing, from black suits to only grey pants. In the music video for "All Your Dreams", Jun Jin stars as the main lead, with the other members of Shinhwa playing various roles. It also features another SM Entertainment group, Black Beat as well as Kim Bomi.

The music video tells the story of a man (Jun Jin) and a woman (Kim Bomi) who are shown to be attracted to each other romantically. However, another man (played by Jinyoung of Black Beat) shows romantic interest in the woman as well, thus initiating a fight between the Shinhwa and Black Beat members towards the end of the music video.

"First Love", unlike the other two, does not show Shinhwa in a choreographed dance nor portray a story. It instead features various clips of Shinhwa, from practicing their choreographies to performing in concerts. "Wedding March", again starring Jun Jin as the main role, shows a man proposing to his love interest.

== Accolades ==
"Only One" received a nomination for Best Dance Performance at the 2000 Mnet Music Video Festival, but lost to Clon's "Choryeon".

Music program awards
Song	Program	Date
"Only One"	Music Camp	June 24, 2000
"Only One"	Music Camp	July 1, 2000
"Only One"	Music Camp	July 8, 2000
"Only One"	Inkigayo	July 9, 2000
"Only One"	Inkigayo	July 16, 2000
"All Your Dreams"	Inkigayo	August 27, 2000
"All Your Dreams"	Music Camp	September 6, 2000

== Track listing ==
No.	Title	Lyrics	Music	Arrangement	Length
1.	"Intro"	J-Style (Bang Sung-joon), Eric Mun	J-Style	J-Style	1:24
2.	"I Wanna Be"	Yoo Young-jin, E. Mun	Y.J. Yoo	Y.J. Yoo	3:51
3.	"Only One"	Y.J. Yoo, E. Mun	Y.J. Yoo	Y.J. Yoo	3:51
4.	"All Your Dreams"	Kim Jin-kwon, Lee San-in, Kim Sang-dae	J.K. Kim	J.K. Kim	4:22
5.	"First Love"	Ji Kook-hyun, E. Mun	K.H. Ji	K.H. Ji	4:21
6.	"Jam #1"	Y.J. Yoo	Y.J. Yoo	Y.J. Yoo	3:23
7.	"Never Come to Me"	Seo Yoong-keun, Lee Woo-cheon, E. Mun	Y.K. Seo	Y.K. Seo	3:10
8.	"Change"	Lee Seung-ho, E. Mun	Yoon Il-sang		3:55
9.	"Vortex"	Park Jae-sam, E. Mun	J-Style	J-Style	4:23
10.	"White Night"	Shin Hye-sung, E. Mun	Park Sin-young	Park Sin-young	3:58
11.	"Cyber Love"	Park Eun-hee	Park Hae-woon	H.W. Park	3:57
12.	"Soul"	Lee Min-woo, E. Mun	M.W. Lee	M.W. Lee	3:56
13.	"To My Family" (Korean: 나의 가족들에게)	Kim Dong-wan, E. Mun	D.W. Kim	D.W. Kim	3:43
14.	"Wedding March (Your Side)" (Korean: Wedding March (너의 곁에서))	H.S. Shin, E. Mun	Hong Sung-kyoo	S.K. Hong	4:21

== Credits and personnel ==
Credits are adapted from the album liner notes.

=== Album production ===
- Lee Soo-man – producer
- KAT – recording engineer, mixing engineer
- Yeo Doo-hyeon – recording engineer, mixing engineer
- Kim Young-hoon – recording engineer, mixing engineer
- Rich Wenzel – recording engineer
- Richard S. Vick – recording engineer
- Yoo Young-jin – recording engineer, mixing engineer
- Jeon Hoon at Sonic Korea – mastering engineer

=== Guitar ===
- Groovie K – "I Wanna Be", "Only One", "All Your Dreams", "Soul"
- Sam Lee – "First Love" (electric guitar), "Cyber Love", "To My Family"
- Ji Kook-hyun – "First Love" (programming guitar)
- J-Style – "Vortex"
- Ham Choon-ho – "Wedding March"

=== Bass ===
- Lee Tae-yoon – "I Wanna Be", "First Love", "To My Family"

=== Violin ===
- Shim Sang-won – "Wedding March"
- Kim Hye-eun – "Wedding March"
- Kim Woo-hyun – "Wedding March"

== Charts ==
Chart	Peak position	Sales
South Korea Monthly Albums (RIAK) May 2000	1	KOR: 423,873
South Korea Yearly Albums (RIAK) 2000	17	KOR: 423,873

== Release history ==
Country	Date	Distributing label	Format
South Korea	May 23, 2000	SM Entertainment, Synnara Records	CD (SSM-043)
Japan	August 1, 2001	Avex Trax	CD (AVCD-18014)
