= The Classic (Shinhwa album) =

Studio album by Shinhwa
- Released: 16 May 2013
- Genre: K-pop; electropop; dance
- Length: 37:55
- Language: Korean
- Label: CJ E&M Music; Sony Music Taiwan
- Producer: Shinhwa Company

Shinhwa chronology
The Return (2012)	The Classic (2013)	'We' (2015)

Singles from The Classic
- 1. "This Love" Released: 16 May 2013

The Classic is the eleventh studio album of South Korean boy band Shinhwa, in commemoration of their 15th anniversary. It was released on 16 May 2013, by Shinhwa Company and distributed by CJ E&M Music. The group conducted an Asian concert tour, 2013 Shinhwa Grand Tour: The Classic in support of the album, with the first show in Hong Kong on 8 June 2013.

It was first released as a limited edition and followed by a regular Thanks Edition on 21 May. According to Gaon Chart, as of the end of December 2013, the album has sold a cumulative total of 78,727 copies, of both editions.

== Album and music video ==
The album includes 10 tracks produced by producers and lyricists, Ahn Young-min, Kim Do-hyun, Andrew Choi, Neighborhood Brother and Brian Kim; as well as Shinhwa member Lee Min-woo. The album's lead track is "This Love", which was gifted by Lee McCutcheon, James Flannigan and UK producer Andrew Jackson, who also worked on their previous lead track "Venus" from The Return in 2012. It is a British style electronic track, which shares the same characteristics and dreamlike quality as "Venus" but with heavy basses, deep electronics; and a sudden change to light mood at the end. Shin Hye-sung revealed that they had four songs in contention as the lead track and "This Love" was chosen after staff members voted in favour of it by 3–40. As it is seen as a continuation of "Venus" with the same style of electropop beat, yet it is also different.

The track "That's Right" was composed by Kim Do-hyun, who previously composed Lee Hyori's hit song "10 Minutes" from her 2003 album Stylish. Other collaboration with foreign composers is "Hurricane", by Samuel Waelmo, Robert Vadadi and Kim Young-hu. The lyrics for "That's Right", "New Me", "Hurricane" and "I Gave You", as Shinhwa's wedding song, were written by Min-woo.

Shinhwa members vogue dancing in the "This Love" music video. (L to R: Shin Hye-sung, Jun Jin, Eric, Lee Min-woo, Andy and Kim Dong-wan)

The music video for "This Love", was shot over two days on 1 and 2 May. It features Japanese actress Fujii Mina, and directed by Cho Soo-hyun, who also directed the music video for Psy's "Gangnam Style" and "Gentleman"; and also the music video for "Once in a Lifetime" from Shinhwa's State of the Art album in 2006. The choreography for the song involves vogue dancing, made popular by Madonna in her music video "Vogue". The dance style involves focusing on expressing the rhythm of the music whilst posing like a model, which has not been attempted by the group nor any Korean idol groups before. They wanted the outfits and dance to convey the feeling from a fashion magazine or runway show, with sophisticated and sensual feelings of men in their thirties. Lee Min-woo said "It was a dance harder to put together than it seems, but it contains individual parts that will let each of us shine. You′ll be able to see a voguing dance remade to fit Shinhwa", Eric further explained, "We took the strengths of the voguing dance and changed it in a Shinhwa way to fit us".

On 10 May 2013, the teaser for the music video was released on Shinhwa's official YouTube channel, and followed by the full MV on 16 May, showcasing various elements of voguing poses and controlled moves, such as hand performance, catwalk, dips and spins.

== Release ==
The album was released as a limited edition of 40,000 copies, in a black tin case with a 100-page colour photo book and lyrics book, with photos by Zo Sun-hee. It was sold out on 8 May 2013, the day pre-order started, with the server of Synnara Music crashing for over an hour due to overwhelming web traffic. To meet the demand Shinhwa Company announced the release of a regular Thanks Edition, with pre-orders available from 10 May, released on 21 May. The regular edition is smaller with a paper out-box emblazoned with Shinhwa's official logo and also contain a 100-page photobook by photographer Zo Sun-hee.

On 13 May, individual teaser photos of Jun Jin and Andy were released, along with a behind-the-scenes video of the photo shoot for the album cover with photographer Zo Sun-hee. This was followed by photos of Kim Dong-wan and Shin Hye-sung on 14 May, and a video of the recording process for the album, with the final photos of Eric and Lee Min-woo the following day, as well as another video showing the making-of footage for "This Love" music video.

== Commercial performance ==
On the day of release "This Love" took first place on various online music charts, including Mnet, Bugs, Naver Music, Daum Music, Olleh Music, Cyworld, and Soribada; and ranked second on Melon. Other tracks from the album such as "Scarface", "Acquainted Guy", "New Me" and "Mannequin" also charted on the singles charts. "This Love" was ranked number one for four consecutive weeks on Soribada Weekly Chart from 13 May to 9 June. The 'Limited Edition' debut at number three on Gaon Weekly Top 100 Album Chart for the week of 12 to 18 May 2013 and the 'Thank Edition' ranked second the following week. It also place first on Tower Record's Daily Chart in Japan as an imported album. On 21 May the 'Thank Edition' was ranked number one on both Hanteo Real-time and Daily Charts, as well as number one for both imported editions in Taiwan on Five Music J-Pop/K-Pop Chart for week 21 and Chia Chia Record for week of 14 to 20 May.

== Promotion ==
The first live music promotional appearance for the album was on Mnet's M! Countdown on 16 May, where they performed "That's Right" and "This Love", along with 2PM, for their album Grown and Seo In-young for her EP Forever Young. This was followed by performances of tracks "Brand New", from their 2004 album of same name, and "This Love" on the 700th episode of Korean Broadcasting System (KBS) music programme Music Bank on 17 May. Other promotional appearances includes performances on MBC Music's Show Champion and Munhwa Broadcasting Corporation (MBC)'s Music Core; but not on Inkigayo on Seoul Broadcasting System (SBS).

After three weeks of music programme appearances, the group collected eight first place wins for "This Love", including the Triple Crown, i.e. first place for three consecutive weeks, on M! Countdown; the first since "Brand New" in 2004. This also surpasses the previous record of seven number one wins, held by "Yo!" from their second album, T.O.P. in 1999. Other wins include two each from Show Champion, and Music Core; and one from Music Bank.

== Accolades ==
Awards and nominations
Year	Organization	Category	Result	Ref.
2013	Mnet 20's Choice Awards	20's Voice	Won	
2013	Mnet 20's Choice Awards	20's Performance	Nominated	
2014	Golden Disc Awards	Album Bonsang (Main Prize)	Nominated	
2014	Golden Disc Awards	Popularity Award	Nominated	
2014	Seoul Music Awards	Popularity Award	Nominated	

Music program awards for "This Love"
Program	Date	Ref.
M Countdown	23 May 2013	
M Countdown	30 May 2013	
M Countdown	6 June 2013	
Show! Music Core	25 May 2013	
Show! Music Core	1 June 2013	
Show Champion	29 May 2013	
Show Champion	5 June 2013	
Music Bank	31 May 2013	

== Track listing ==
No.	Title	Lyrics	Music	Length
1.	"That's Right" (그래; Geurae)	Lee Min-woo	Kim Do-hyun	3:58
2.	"Acquainted Guy" (아는 남자; Aneun Namja)	Ahn Young-min	Ahn Young-min	4:16
3.	"This Love"	Brian Kim	Lee McCutcheon, Andrew Jackson, James Flannigan	3:40
4.	"Scarface"	Brian Kim	D3O, Gavin Jones	3:19
5.	"New Me"	Lee Min-woo	Lim Gwang-wook, Andrew Choi	4:01
6.	"Laughing..." (웃다가...; Utdaga...)	Choi Gap-won	Seo Jae-woo, Seo Yong-bae	3:54
7.	"Mannequin"	e.one	e.one	3:37
8.	"Hurricane"	Lee Min-woo	Samuel Waelmo, Robert Vadadi, Kim Young-hu	3:55
9.	"I Gave You"	Lee Min-woo	Melody9	3:39
10.	"Love Song" (사랑 노래; Sarang Norae)	Shi-jin	Neighborhood Brother	3:36
Total length:				37:55

== Charts ==
=== Album charts ===
Chart	Peak position	Sales
Korea Weekly Albums (Gaon)	2	KOR: 78,727
Korea Monthly Albums (Gaon)	4	KOR: 78,727
Korea Yearly Albums (Gaon)	29	KOR: 78,727

== Release history ==
Country	Date	Distributing label	Format
South Korea	16 May 2013	CJ E&M Music	Digital download Limited Edition (CD) (CMCC-10098)
South Korea	21 May 2013	CJ E&M Music	Thanks Edition (CD) (CMCC-10085)
Taiwan	28 June 2013	Sony Music Taiwan	CD
