= Perfect Man (Shinhwa album) =

- Perfect Man cover

Studio album by Shinhwa
- Released: March 29, 2002
- Recorded: 2001–2002
- Studio: SM Studios (Seoul)
- Genres: K-pop; R&B
- Length: 45:12
- Language: Korean
- Label: SM

Shinhwa chronology
My Choice (2002)	Perfect Man (2002)	Wedding (2002)

Singles from Perfect Man
- 1. "Perfect Man" Released: March 29, 2002; 2. "I Pray 4 U" Released: March 29, 2002

Perfect Man is the fifth Korean studio album by South Korean boy band Shinhwa. It was released on March 29, 2002, by SM Entertainment. The title track "Perfect Man", includes lyrics with a persuasive love theme, it was followed by a second single entitled, "I Pray 4 U".

The album debuted at number one on the monthly Korean Chart, becoming Shinhwa's second number-one album. It sold 355,333 copies, and remained on the chart for a total of 23 weeks. The album placed at No. 14 on the year-end chart "Top 100 Albums in 2002".

== Music videos ==
For their music video "Perfect Man", Shinhwa each held a bouquet of yellow flowers. Each members in the music video portray different people, with Lee Min-woo walking and singing first, holding his bouquet of yellow flowers and transition into Kim Dong-wan, who drove an ATV. Dongwan later changed into Andy, who is a businessman in the music video, when he enters an elevator. Andy later change into Jun Jin while doing push ups in the gym, and then change into Shin Hye-sung while he sat in a car. Hyesung walks behind a glass door that blurs his figure, and the music video switches to where Shinhwa is dancing, each with a microphone stand before them. Eric is shown rapping, and he then walks out from the other side of the glass door which Hyesung had stepped in from. The music video ended with the members throwing their bouquet of yellow flowers and dancing on a stage with a crowd screaming.

Their music video for "I Pray 4 U" was much more simple, showing the members singing around a boat (owned by Minwoo in the music video). It also showed the members playing basketball against each other.

== Andy's return ==
Andy, who did not participate in their fourth album Hey, Come On!, came back to participate in this one. Despite him not participating in the fourth album, whenever Shinhwa performs one of their song from the fourth album, Andy was given a line that was previously either Eric's or Jun Jin's. One such example was Hey, Come On!. Originally, Jun Jin was the one who was rapping in the beginning but whenever they perform the song at their concert or such, Andy was given the task to rap it.

== Accolades ==
Awards and nominations for Perfect Man
Year	Organization	Category	Result	Ref.
2002	Golden Disc Awards	Album Bonsang (Main Prize)	Won	
2002	Golden Disc Awards	Album Daesang (Grand Prize)	Nominated	
2002	Mnet Music Video Festival	Best Dance Performance	Nominated	
2002	Mnet Music Video Festival	Best Male Group	Won	

Music program awards
Song	Program	Date
"Perfect Man"	Inkigayo	April 21, 2002
"Perfect Man"	Inkigayo	April 28, 2002
"Perfect Man"	Inkigayo	May 5, 2002
"Perfect Man"	Music Camp	May 4, 2002
"I Pray 4 U"	Music Camp	July 13, 2002

== Track listing ==
Perfect Man track listing
No.	Title	Lyrics	Music	Arrangement	Length
1.	"I Pray 4 U"	Young H. Kim, Eric Mun	Kim Younghoo, William Pyon	Kim Younghoo	3:50
2.	"Perfect Man"	Yoo Young-jin, E. Mun	Yoo Young-jin	Yoo Young-jin	3:25
3.	"Shout"	Jamie, E. Mun	Park sung-soo	Park sung-soo	3:30
4.	"Free"	Lee Min-woo, E. Mun	M.W. Lee	M.W. Lee	4:30
5.	"Fly High, E. Mun"	Hong Ji-yoo	Thomas Asserholt, Lee Joon-ho	J.H. Lee	3:24
6.	"Endless Love"	Kim Jong-sook, E. Mun, Jun Jin, Andy Lee	Kim Jin-hoon	J.H. Kim	4:02
7.	"Comeback To My Life"	Lee Jin-kyung, E. Mun	S.J. Hwang	S.J. Hwang	3:30
8.	"Honestly"	Ji Kook-hyeon, E. Mun	K.H. Ji	K.H. Ji	3:44
9.	"Red Angel"	Han Hyeon-kyeong, E. Mun, Lee Sang-baek	Kim Hyeong-gyu	H.G. Kim	3:45
10.	"Last Zone"	Kim Nam-hui, E. Mun	No Young-joo, Lee Jeong-hoon	Y.J. No, J.H. Lee	3:16
11.	"Reason"	Jeong Han-jong, Rhymer, E. Mun	Lee Chang-hyeon	C.H. Lee	3:51
12.	"In Your Love" (Korean: 너 사랑 안에, romanized: Neo Sarang Aneh)	Choi Yoo-won, E. Mun	Y.W. Choi	Park Moon-soo	4:25

== Personnel ==
Credits are adapted from the album liner notes.

=== Album production ===
- Lee Soo-man – executive producer
- KAT – recording engineer, mixing engineer
- Yeo Doo-hyeon – recording engineer, mixing engineer
- Lee Seong-ho – recording engineer
- Kim Beom-gu – recording engineer
- Kim Yong-seong – recording engineer
- Kwak Seung-eun – recording engineer
- Eom Chan-yong – recording engineer
- Jeon Hoon – mastering engineer

=== Guitar ===
- Groovie K – "Perfect Man"
- Hong Joon-ho – "Shout", "Last Zone"
- Sam Lee – "Free", "Fly High"
- Lee Geun-hyeong – "Endless Love", "Red Angel"
- Lee Seong-wol – "Honesty"
- Tommy Kim – "Reason"
- Jeong Ki-seong – "In Your Love"

=== Bass ===
- Shin Hyeon-kwon – "Free"

=== Strings ===
- Oh Jo-han 5 – "Endless Love"

== Charts ==
=== Weekly charts ===
Chart (2002, 2013)	Peak position
Japanese Albums (Oricon)	99
South Korean Albums (Gaon)	9

=== Monthly charts ===
Chart (2002)	Peak position
South Korean Albums (RIAK)	1

=== Year-end charts ===
Chart (2002)	Position
South Korean Albums (RIAK)	14

== Sales ==
Country	Sales
South Korea (RIAK)	365,739

== Release history ==
Country	Date	Distributing label	Format
South Korea	March 30, 2002	SM Entertainment	CD (SM-033); Cassette (SM-034)
Japan	September 4, 2002	Avex Trax	CD (AVCD-18036)
