= Hey, Come On! =

Studio album by Shinhwa
- Released: June 28, 2001
- Recorded: 2001
- Studio: SM Digital Recording Studio (Seoul)
- Genre: K-pop
- Length: 48:06
- Language: Korean
- Label: SM

Shinhwa chronology
Only One (2000)	Hey, Come On! (2001)	My Choice (2002)

Singles from Hey, Come On!
- 1. "Hey, Come On!" Released: June 28, 2001; 2. "Wild Eyes" Released: June 28, 2001

Hey, Come On! is the fourth Korean-language studio album by South Korean boy band Shinhwa. It was released on June 28, 2001, by SM Entertainment. As with their past albums, Hey, Come On! was well received by fans and the title track climbed up charts rapidly. The album's release coincided with the rise of the Korean Wave, spreading the group's popularity overseas. Hey, Come On! spent 28 weeks on the MIAK Chart before it dropped.

== Music video ==
In the music video for "Hey, Come On!", Shinhwa can be seen dancing in a white room. The choreography consists of heavy leg movement as well as members (mostly Jun Jin) jumping around. The music video concentrates heavily on Jun Jin and Lee Min Woo. Towards the end of the music video, we can see Minwoo running towards a wall and jumping into it, causing the "wall" to open. This suggests that perhaps the members were in space, and dancing inside of a white rocket, though it is unclear.

== Controversy ==
=== Cover disputes against the other Asian groups ===
Although Hey, Come On! was well received, it garnered much controversy at the time. Andy Lee didn't participate in the album and took a temporary hiatus from group promotions to care for his critically ill mother in California. Another controversy that arose was when Taiwanese boy band Energy covered Shinhwa's song, "Hey, Come On!", calling it "Come On!", causing Shinhwa fans to dislike Energy. Later, the Taiwanese group 5566 also covered Shinhwa's "Dark".

== Accolades ==
Awards and nominations for Hey, Come On!
Year	Organization	Category	Result	Ref.
2001	Golden Disc Awards	Album Bonsang (Main Prize)'	Won	
2001	Golden Disc Awards	Album Daesang (Grand Prize)	Nominated	
2001	SBS Gayo Daejeon	Grand Prize (Daesang)	Nominated	
2001	SBS Gayo Daejeon	Main Prize (Bonsang)	Won	

Music program awards for "Hey, Come On!"
Program	Date
Inkigayo	September 9, 2001
Inkigayo	September 16, 2001

== Track listing ==
No.	Title	Lyrics	Music	Arrangement	Length
1.	"Just 2 Be With U"	Young H.Kim	Young H.Kim, William Pyon	Young H.Kim	4:20
2.	"Hey! Come On!"	Shin Hye-sung, Eric Mun	Peter Rafelson, Jeff Vincent	Peter Rafelson, Jeff Vincent	3:27
3.	"Shinhwa Knight"	Ji Kook-hyeon, E. Mun	K.H. Ji	K.H. Ji	4:11
4.	"Wild Eyes"	Yoo Young-jin	Y.J. Yoo	Y.J. Yoo	3:21
5.	"Reminiscence"	Lee Min-woo, E. Mun	M.W. Lee, E. Mun	M.W. Lee	4:07
6.	"Falling in Love"	Shin Hye-sung	Dave Pickell, Ron Irving	Hong Jeong-soo, Lee In-seong	4:10
7.	"Never Can Rewind"	Kim Dong-hyeon, E. Mun, Kim Dong-wan	S.S. Park	S.S. Park	3:29
8.	"Trippin'"	Seo Yoong-geun, E. Mun	Y.G. Seo	Y.G. Seo	3:17
9.	"Sure I Know (And...Farewell)" (Korean: Sure I Know (이별... 그리고))	H.S. Shin, E. Mun	Yoon Chi-woong	C.W. Yoon	4:15
10.	"Dark"	Kim Young-ah, E. Mun, Kim Dong-wan	Kim Seok-chan	Jeon Joon-kyu	3:54
11.	"Egotism (April 1, 1997)" (Egotism (97年 4月 1日))	D.W. Kim, E. Mun, Heo In-chang, Hoo Ni-hoon	D.W. Kim	D.W. Kim	4:52
12.	"I Swear..."	Shin Hye-sung, Yoo Young-jin	Kangta, Yoo Young-jin	Kangta, Jeon Dong-hyuk, Yoo Young-jin	4:43

== Credits and personnel ==
Credits are adapted from the album liner notes.

Shinhwa

- Eric Mun – main rap, chorus (2, 6, 9, 10), director (5)
- Lee Min-woo – sub vocals, chorus (2, 3, 6, 7, 9, 10), director (5)
- Jun Jin – lead rap, chorus (2, 6, 7, 9, 10)
- Kim Dong-wan – sub vocals, chorus (2, 6, 7, 9, 10), director (11)
- Shin Hye-seong – main vocals, director (1, 6), chorus (2, 6, 9, 10)

Hey Come On! & Wild Eyes duet

- Jun Jin – lead rap, chorus
- Kim Dong-wan – sub vocal, chorus

Session

- Yoo Young-jin – chorus (4)
- Won Hyun-jung, Kim Hyo-soo – chorus (2)
- Taewan Choi – piano (3)
- Hyunah Kim, Jihwan Moon – chorus (3, 8)
- Groovie K – electric guitar (5)
- Taeyoon Lee – bass guitar (5, 7, 12)
- Oh Jo-hwan – violin (5, 7, 11, 12)
- Hong Jun-ho – other (6)
- Seungwoo Jeon – chorus (6)
- Sam Lee – other (7, 8, 10)
- Bae Bae Hee – violin (7, 11, 12)
- Dong-sook Choi – violin (7, 11)
- Seongsu Park – chorus (7)
- Yohwan Oh – cello (7, 11, 12)
- Song Gwang-sik – piano (8, 12)
- Jeonggi Song – other (9, 12)
- Seongho Kang – chorus (9)
- Seokchan Kim – chorus (10)
- Soyoung Yoon, Soyul Song – violin (11)
- Park Ki-ho, Shin Dong-hyun, Lee Se-jin – chorus (11)
- Kangta – computer programming, synthesizer, director (12)
- Suho Kang – drums (12)
- Bae Jin-sook, Kim Hyun-kyung, Lim Chae-young, Kim Hee-young, Noh Seung-rim, Woo Jin-hee, Jo Se-won, Moon Ji-eun – violin (12)
- Han Soo-hee, Lee Bo-mi, Jo Yun-young – viola (12)

Staff

- Lee Soo-man – executive producer
- SM Entertainment – executive producer
- KAT, Yeo Doo-hyun – recording, mixing
- Seongho Lee, Byeongjae Kim – recording
- Youngseong Kim, Beomgu Kim (Cool Sound) – recording (1~3, 5~7, 11)
  - Han Jeong-eun – recording assistant (1~3, 5~7, 11)
- Yoo Young-jin (Booming System) – recording, mixing, director (4)
  - Yoo Chang-yong, Yoo Han-jin – assistant (4)
- Yeo Do-hyun, Lee Seong-ho, Kim Byeong-jae (SM Digital Recording Studio) – recording (8, 10)
- Seungyup Lee (Spell Recording Studio) – recording (9)
- Wookjung Kim (GAGA Studio) – recording, mixing (12)
  - Koo Ji-ae – assistant (12)
- Jeon Hoon (Sonic Korea) – mastering
- SM Entertainment A&R Team (Kim Ki-beom, Yoo Je-won, Yoo Hyuk, Shin Jeong-won, Park Man-jin, Yoo Jenny) – A&R
- Hong Hyun-jong, Park Kwon-young – MPR
  - Se-yeon Lee, Seong-jin So, Si-ho Lee, Seong-min Han – MPR assistant
- Chang-hwan Jeong, Jeong-hoon Park – artist development, marketing
- Seung-eun Oh, Nam-don Cho, Hyeon-cheol Lim – CD Plus design
- Cool Sound, Haru Communication – CD Plus production
- Lee Min-woo, Standby – choreography
- Kim Jung-man – photography
- Myunghee Kim, Sena Jeong, Yumi Lee, Yuri Jeong – stylist
- Seunggyu Kook – art director, design
- Myungjin Art Co., Ltd. – printing
- Kyungwook Kim – production

== Charts ==
=== Weekly charts ===
Chart (2013)	Peak position
South Korean Albums (Gaon)	6

=== Monthly charts ===
Chart (June 2001)	Peak position
South Korean Albums (RIAK)	3

=== Year-end charts ===
Chart (2001)	Position
South Korean Albums (RIAK)	8

== Sales ==
Chart	Sales
South Korea (RIAK)	434,203

== Release history ==
Country	Date	Distributing label	Format
South Korea	June 28, 2001	SM Entertainment	CD (SM-007)
Japan	August 1, 2001	Avex Trax	CD (AVCD-18001)
