= We (Shinhwa album) =

Studio album by Shinhwa
- Released: February 26, 2015
- Recorded: 2014–2015
- Genre: Dance-pop
- Length: 36:47
- Language: Korean
- Label: Shinhwa Company

Shinhwa chronology
The Classic (2013)	We (2015)	Unchanging: Part 1 Orange (2017)

Singles from We
- 1. "Memory" Released: February 3, 2015; 2. "Sniper" Released: February 26, 2015

We is the twelfth Korean-language studio album by South Korean boy band Shinhwa, released through Shinhwa Company on February 26, 2015. The album features ten tracks in total, including the pre-release single "Memory" and the single "Sniper". The album peaked at number two on the Gaon Album Chart and sold over 57,000 copies in 2015. In support of the album, Shinhwa embarked on their 17th Anniversary Concert Tour "We".

== Background and singles ==
We was preceded with the pre-release single "Memory", which was released on February 3, 2015. It peaked at number 15 on the Gaon Digital Chart. The single "Sniper" was released in conjunction with the album, which reached number three on the Gaon Digital Chart and was downloaded over 240,000 times. It won 10 first place domestic music program awards during its promotion, making it the group's most awarded song.

== Accolades ==
Music program awards for "Sniper"
Program	Date	Ref.
Show Champion	March 11, 2015	
Show Champion	March 18, 2015	
M Countdown	March 12, 2015	
M Countdown	March 19, 2015	
M Countdown	March 26, 2015	
Music Bank	March 13, 2015	
Show! Music Core	March 14, 2015	
Show! Music Core	March 21, 2015	
Inkigayo	March 15, 2015	
Inkigayo	March 22, 2015	

== Promotion and live performances ==
=== 2015 17th Anniversary Concert "We" ===
On January 8, 2015, Shinhwa Company released the schedule for Shinhwa's 17th anniversary concert on its official website. Fan club pre-sales began on February 11 and general reservations began two days later through Interpark. On June 24, 2015, Shinhwa Company released the schedule for a two-day encore concert marking the finale of Shinhwa's 17th anniversary Asian tour through its official website.

List of tour dates
Date	City	Country	Venue	Attendance
March 21, 2015	Seoul	South Korea	Olympic Gymnastics Arena	22,000
March 22, 2015	Seoul	South Korea	Olympic Gymnastics Arena	22,000
May 9, 2015	Shanghai	China	Mercedes-Benz Arena	15,000
May 16, 2015	Taipei	Taiwan	Nangang Exhibition Hall	10,000
June 20, 2015	Nanjing	China	Nanjing Olympic Sports Centre	10,000
June 27, 2015	Beijing	China	MasterCard Center	12,000
July 11, 2015	Dalian	China	Dalian Sports Center Gymnasium	10,000
August 22, 2015	Seoul	South Korea	Olympic Gymnastics Arena	22,000
August 23, 2015	Seoul	South Korea	Olympic Gymnastics Arena	22,000
Total				101,000

== Track listing ==
We track listing
No.	Title	Length
1.	"Alright"	3:23
2.	"Cat" (고양이; Goyangi)	3:29
3.	"Sniper" (표적; Pyojeog; lit. Target)	3:18
4.	"White Shirts"	4:38
5.	"Don't Cry"	3:39
6.	"Ice Moon" (얼음달; Eol-eumdal)	3:20
7.	"Give It 2 Me"	3:13
8.	"I'm In Love"	3:41
9.	"Memory"	3:45
10.	"Never Give Up"	4:21
Total length:		36:47

== Charts ==
=== Weekly charts ===
Chart (2015)	Peak position
South Korean Albums (Gaon)	2
US World Albums (Billboard)	6

=== Monthly charts ===
Chart (2015)	Peak position
South Korean Albums (Gaon)	5

=== Year-end charts ===
Chart (2015)	Position
South Korean Albums (Gaon)	44
