= Wedding (album) =

Studio album by Shinhwa
- Released: December 27, 2002
- Recorded: 2002
- Studio: SM Studios (Seoul)
- Genre: K-pop
- Length: 53:16
- Language: Korean
- Label: SM

Shinhwa chronology
Perfect Man (2002)	Wedding (2002)	Winter Story (2003)

Singles from Wedding
- 1. "Wedding" Released: December 27, 2002; 2. "Deep Sorrow" Released: December 27, 2002

Wedding (Korean: 너의 결혼식; RR: Neoui Gyeolhonsik; lit. 'Your Wedding') is the sixth studio album by South Korean boy group Shinhwa, released through SM Entertainment on December 27, 2002. With the release of Your Wedding, Shinhwa also broke the record for being the longest running boy band in the history of South Korea, a record they are still currently holding as they have not yet disbanded.

Shinhwa was also the second artist to in South Korea to release two albums (Perfect Man and Your Wedding) in a year, with Sechs Kies being first. Your Wedding sold approximately 273,714 copies. It was their final album with SM Entertainment. It was marketed in Japan as Wedding - Kimi to Deatta Toki (ウェディング～君と出逢ったとき).

== Accolades ==
Awards and nominations for Wedding
Year	Organization	Category	Result	Ref.
2003	Golden Disc Awards	Album Bonsang (Main Prize)	Won	
2003	Golden Disc Awards	Album Daesang (Grand Prize)	Nominated	
2003	Mnet Music Video Festival	Best Dance Performance	Nominated	
2003	Mnet Music Video Festival	Best Male Group	Won	
2003	Mnet Music Video Festival	Netizen Popularity Award	Won	
2003	SBS Gayo Daejeon	Grand Prize (Daesang)	Nominated	
2003	SBS Gayo Daejeon	Main Prize (Bonsang)	Won	

Music program awards for "Wedding"
Program	Date
Music Camp	February 8, 2003
Music Camp	February 15, 2003
Inkigayo	February 9, 2003
Inkigayo	February 16, 2003

== Tracks ==
No.	Title	Lyrics	Music	Arrangement	Length
1.	"Hiway (Ride With Me)"	Yoo Young-jin, Shawn Rize Kuk	Y.J. Yoo	Y.J. Yoo	4:15
2.	"Lost in Love"	Lee Min-woo, Eric Mun	M.W. Lee	M.W. Lee	4:02
3.	"Your Wedding" (Korean: 너의 결혼식)	Y.J. Yoo, E. Mun	Yoo Han-jin, Y.J. Yoo	H.J. Yoo	3:26
4.	"Soulmate"	Young H. Kim, E. Mun	Y.H. Kim, William Pyon	Y.H. Kim	4:04
5.	"My Own Secret" (Korean: 비밀)	Tae-hoon, E. Mun	Hwang Seong-jae	S.J. Hwang	3:43
6.	"Poisoning (Deep Sorrow)" (Korean: 중독 (Deep Sorrow))	Y.J. Yoo, E. Mun	Y.J. Yoo	Y.J. Yoo	4:35
7.	"...Later" (Korean: ...후에)	M.W. Lee, E. Mun	M.W. Lee	M.W. Lee	3:31
8.	"Gonna Be Alright" (Korean: 괜찮아요)	Ji Kook-hyeon, E. Mun	Ji Kook-hyeon	K.H. Ji	4:23
9.	"Get Up"	Hong Ji-yoo	Hyeon Jin-young	J.Y. Hyeon	3:35
10.	"Missing U"	Lee Jin-kyeong, Eric Mun	Oh Seung-eun	S.E. Oh	4:10
11.	"Without You" (Korean: 네가 없다면)	Jeon Seung-woo, E. Mun	Kim Do-hoon	D.H. Kim	4:36
12.	"79"	M.W. Lee, E. Mun, Kim Dong-wan, Heo In-chang	M.W. Lee	M.W. Lee	4:19
13.	"You (Glow...)" (Korean: You (노을...))	Shin Hye-sung, E. Mun	J&S	J&S	4:37

== Credits and personnel ==
Credits are adapted from the liner notes of Your Wedding.

=== Album production ===
- Lee Soo-man – executive producer
- KAT – recording engineer, mixing engineer
- Yeo Doo-hyeon – recording engineer, mixing engineer
- Lee Seong-ho – recording engineer, mixing engineer
- Yoo Young-jin – recording engineer, mixing engineer
- Kim Beom-gu – recording engineer
- Kim Young-seong – recording engineer
- Kwan Seung-eun – recording engineer
- Kim Young-jin – recording engineer
- Eom Seung-hyeon – recording engineer
- Lee Jeong-hyeong – recording engineer
- Ha Jeong-soo – recording engineer
- Jeong Ki-song – recording engineer
- Jeong Hoon – mastering engineer

=== Guitar ===
- Sam Lee – "Lost in Love", "My Own Secret", "Deep Sorrow", "Later", "Missing U", "Without You", "79"
- Ham Choon-ho – "Gonna Be Alright"
- Jeong Ki-song – "Get Up"

=== Bass ===
- Lee Tae-woon – "Lost in Love", "My Own Secret", "Later", "Gonna Be Alright", "79"

=== Strings ===
- Kim Mi-jeong 9 – "Hiway (Ride With Me)"
- Min Young-ae 5 – "Get Up"

=== Piano ===
- Jo Hyeon-seok – "Deep Sorrow"
- Choi Tae-wan – "Gonna Be Alright"

=== Scratch ===
- DJ Mike - "Get Up"

== Charts ==
=== Weekly charts ===
Chart (2003, 2013)	Peak position
Japanese Albums (Oricon)	100
South Korean Albums (Gaon)	8

=== Monthly charts ===
Chart (2002)	Peak position
South Korean Albums (RIAK)	3

=== Year-end charts ===
Chart (2002)	Position
South Korean Albums (RIAK)	33

== Sales ==
Country	Sales
South Korea (RIAK)	284,073

== Release history ==
Country	Date	Distributing label	Format
South Korea	December 27, 2002	SM Entertainment	CD (SM-051); Cassette (SM-052)
Japan	March 19, 2003	Avex Trax	CD (AVCD-18043)
