= My Choice (album) =

- My Choice cover

Greatest hits album by Shinhwa
- Released: January 31, 2002
- Recorded: 2002
- Genres: K-pop, Dance
- Language: Korean
- Label: SM Entertainment
- Producer: Lee Soo Man

Shinhwa chronology
Hey, Come On! (2001)	My Choice (2002)	Perfect Man (2002)

My Choice (also known as Greatest Hits) is the first compilation album of South Korean boy band, Shinhwa. It was released on January 31, 2002 by SM Entertainment. The album features eleven previously released songs, from their debut album Resolver in 1998 to their fourth album Hey, Come On! in 2001, four new and one remix tracks. It was met with moderate success, selling 183,098 copies.

== Tracks ==
New tracks in bold

1. "**My Life Style**"
2. "**I Love You**"
3. "T.O.P (Twinkling of Paradise)"
4. "Wild Eyes"
5. "First Love"
6. **"All Your Dreams" (remix)**
7. "해결사" (The Solver)
8. "Falling in Love"
9. "Only One"
10. "Yo!" (악동보고서)
11. "천일유혼" (Sharing Forever)
12. "으싸! 으싸!" (Uh Sha Uh Sha)
13. "Wedding March" (너의 곁에서)
14. "Hey, Come On!"
15. "**Maybe**"
16. "**Into My Heart**"

== Chart performance ==
Chart	Peak position	Sales
Korea Monthly Albums (RIAK) January 2002	4	KOR: 185,097
Korea Yearly Albums (RIAK) 2002	31	KOR: 185,097
Korea Weekly Albums (Gaon) Week ending November 23, 2013	17	KOR: 185,097
Korea Monthly Albums (Gaon) November 2013	67	KOR: 185,097

== Release history ==
Country	Date	Distributing label	Format
South Korea	31 May 2002	SM Entertainment	CD (SSM-023)
