= Winter Story (album) =

Studio album by Shinhwa
- Released: December 30, 2003
- Recorded: 2003
- Genres: K-pop; dance
- Length: 47:41
- Language: Korean
- Labels: Good Entertainment; EMI Music Japan; Virgin Music

Shinhwa chronology
Wedding (2002)	Winter Story (2003)	Brand New (2004)

Singles from Winter Story
- 1. "Young Gunz" Released: December 30, 2003

Winter Story is the first release in the Winter Story album series of South Korean boy band Shinhwa. It was released on December 31, 2003, by Good Entertainment. Following the success of their Winter Story Tour, Shinhwa has released this album with lead track "Young Gunz".

== Track listing ==
Winter Story track listing
No.	Title	Lyrics	Music	Arrangement	Length
1.	"Let's Start!"				5:03
2.	"Mistake"	Yoon Young-doo	Park Sang-hyeon, Kim Tae-wan	S.H. Park, T.W. Kim	3:07
3.	"I Love You"				3:14
4.	"The Days"	Yoon Ji-oong, Hong Chang-seok	Yoon Ji-woong	J.W. Yoon	4:09
5.	"Young Gunz"	Eric Mun	Park Geun-tae	G.T. Park	3:29
6.	"Friend" (Korean: 친구)				2:57
7.	"I" (Korean: 난)	The Koon	Kwon Ki-myeong	K.I. Kwon	4:19
8.	"Dong-wan's Wisdom" (Korean: 동완이의 상식)				0:33
9.	"Negapass"				0:31
10.	"Birth" (Korean: 탄생)				5:38
11.	"Love Letter"	E. Mun	Kim Do-hyeon	D.H. Kim	4:20
12.	"Confession I" (Korean: 고백 I)				4:07
13.	"Confession II" (Korean: 고백 II)				2:56
14.	"Thank You"	An Young-min, Lee Kyeol	Jo Young-soo	Y.S. Jo	4:08

== Credits and personnel ==
Credits are adapted from the liner notes of Winter Story.

=== Album production ===
- Park Kwon-young – executive producer
- Kim Young-seong – recording engineer, mixing engineer
- Kim Beom-gu – recording engineer
- Seo Seung-hyeon – recording engineer
- Yoon Won-kyeon – recording engineer
- Ko Seung-wook – mixing engineer
- Park Hyeon – mixing engineer
- Jo Joon-seong – mixing engineer
- Choi Hyo-young – mastering engineer
- Hong Joon-ho – guitar
- Kim Tae-hyeon – rhythm programming
- Jo Young-soo – piano
- Seo Young-do – bass

== Charts ==
Chart	Peak position	Sales
Korea Monthly Albums (RIAK) January 2004	3	KOR: 81,108

== Release history ==
Country	Date	Distributing label	Format
South Korea	December 30, 2003	Good EMG, IO Music	CD (EKLD-0329)
Japan	March 31, 2004	EMI Music Japan	CD (VJCP-68644)
