= Brand New (Shinhwa album) =

- Brand New cover

Studio album by Shinhwa
- Released: August 27, 2004
- Recorded: 2004
- Genre: K-pop; dance-pop
- Language: Korean
- Label: Good Entertainment; Avex Marketing

Shinhwa chronology
Winter Story (2003)	Brand New (2004)	Winter Story 2004-2005 (2004)

Singles from Brand New
- 1. "Brand New" Released: August 27, 2004; 2. "Angel" Released: August 27, 2004; 3. "Crazy" Released: November 4, 2004; 4. "Oh!" Released: November 4, 2004

Brand New is the seventh studio album of South Korean boy band Shinhwa. It was released on August 27, 2004, by Good Entertainment. It is their first album since leaving SM Entertainment and signing with Good Entertainment. The four lead singles are "Brand New", "Angel", "Crazy" and "Oh". Brand New sold 324,772 copies in 2004 and was the fifth best-selling album of the year.

== Background ==
The members of Shinhwa began taking charge as lyricist in the release of the album. Eric wrote some rap lyrics for some of the songs while Minwoo took charge and began writing full lyrics. Some songs that he wrote are: "All of My", "Oh" and "U". He later went on to write the song "Superstar" for the group Jewelry, which became a hit.

== Commercial performance ==
Brand New debuted at number 3 on the MIAK monthly album chart, and made its way to number 2 before dropping to number 11. However, it made a large jump from number 11 to number 1, with a large jump in sales from 168,654 copies to 320,337 copies. The lead track "Brand New", was composed by Park Geun-tae and Cho Young-soo, won the Triple Crown, i.e. first place for three consecutive weeks, on Mnet's live music program M Countdown.

== Accolades ==
In 2006, "Brand New" was ranked number 58 in a Gallup Korea poll of top 100 favorite Korean songs of all time. Melon and Seoul Shinmun ranked the single number 68 in their 2021 list of the top 100 K-pop songs of all time.

Awards and nominations for Brand New
Year	Organization	Category	Result	Ref.
2004	Golden Disc Awards	Album Bonsang (Main Prize)	Won	
2004	Golden Disc Awards	Album Daesang (Grand Prize)	Nominated	
2004	Mnet KM Music Video Festival	Best Dance Performance (for "Brand New")	Won	
2004	Mnet KM Music Video Festival	Best Male Group Video (for "Angel")	Won	
2004	Mnet KM Music Video Festival	Overseas Viewers' Award (for "Brand New")	Won	
2004	SBS Gayo Daejeon	Grand Prize (Daesang)	Won	
2004	SBS Gayo Daejeon	Main Prize (Bonsang)	Won	
2004	Seoul Music Awards	Popularity Award	Won	

Music program awards
Song	Program	Date	Ref.
"Brand New"	M Countdown	September 30, 2004	
"Brand New"	M Countdown	October 7, 2004	
"Brand New"	M Countdown	October 14, 2004	
"Brand New"	Inkigayo	October 10, 2004	
"Brand New"	Inkigayo	October 17, 2004	
"Crazy"	Inkigayo	December 12, 2004	
"Crazy"	Inkigayo	December 19, 2004	

== Tracks ==
Brand New track listing
No.	Title	Lyrics	Music	Arrangement	Length
1.	"Shooting Star"	Brian Kim, Eric Mun	B. Kim	B. Kim	4:01
2.	"U"	Lee Min-woo, Eric Mun	M.A.R.S.	M.A.R.S.	3:24
3.	"Brand New"	An Young-min, Eric Mun	Park Geun-tae, Jo Young-soo	Park Joon-ho	3:46
4.	"Fever (Crazy)" (Korean: 열병 (Crazy))	Y.M. An, Eric Mun	Y.S. Jo	Y.S. Jo	4:09
5.	"Oh!"	Lee Min Woo, Shin Hye-sung, Eric Mun	Lee Min Woo	Lee Min Woo	4:11
6.	"Angel"	Y.M. An, Eric Mun	Park Geun-tae, Y.S. Jo, Lee Hyeon-seung	Y.S. Jo, H.S. Lee	3:57
7.	"All of My..."	B. Kim, Lee Min Woo, Eric Mun	Lee Min Woo	Lee Min Woo	3:50
8.	"Time Machine"	Eric Mun	Park Geun-tae	Y.S. Jo	4:05
9.	"My Everything Part II" (Korean: 나의 전부 Part II)	Eric Mun	Eric Mun	Eric Mun	3:59
10.	"Set Free" (Korean: 놓아요)	Kim Dong-wan	Kim Dong Wan	D.W. Kim	4:07
11.	"Liar"	E. Mun	Eric Mun	Eric Mun	4:00
12.	"Cheers!" (Korean: 위하여)	Psy, Eric Mun	Psy	Psy	3:02
13.	"I Want" (Korean: 원해)	Lee Sang-in, Eric Mun	S.I. Lee	S.I. Lee	2:56
14.	"2gether 4ever"	Yoon Ji-woong, Eric Mun	J.W. Yoon	J.W. Yoon	4:00

== Credits and personnel ==
Credits are adapted from the liner notes of Brand New.

- Park Geun-tae – producer
- Shinhwa – producer
- Kim Young-seong – recording engineer, mixing engineer
- Yoon Won-kwon – recording engineer
- Song Kyeong-jo – recording engineer
- Kang Hae-gu – recording engineer
- Jeong Doo-seok – recording engineer
- Ha Jeong-soo – recording engineer
- Ko Seung-wook – mixing engineer
- Park Hyeok – mixing engineer
- Jo Kyu-beom – mixing engineer
- Sam Lee – guitar
- Tommy Lee – guitar
- Hong Joon-ho – guitar
- Ko Tae-young – guitar
- Lee Tae-yoon – bass
- Im Seung-beom – keyboard
- The String – strings

== Charts and sales ==
=== Monthly charts ===
Chart (November 2004)	Peak position
South Korean Albums (RIAK)	1

=== Yearly charts ===
Chart (2004)	Position
South Korean Albums (RIAK)	5

=== Sales ===
Region	Sales
South Korea (RIAK)	325,333

== Release history ==
Country	Date	Distributing label	Format
South Korea	August 27, 2004	Good EMG, IO Music	CD (EKLD-0444)
South Korea	November 4, 2004	Good EMG, IO Music	Special Edition (CD+DVD) (EKLD-0492)
Japan	December 8, 2004	Avex Trax	CD (AVCD-18067/B)
