= Haegyeolsa =

Resolver Haegyeolsa

Studio album by Shinhwa
- Released: May 9, 1998
- Recorded: 1998
- Studios: SM Studios, Seoul
- Genre: K-pop
- Language: Korean
- Label: SM

Shinhwa chronology
Resolver; Haegyeolsa (1998)	T.O.P. (1999)

Singles from Haegyeolsa
- 1. "Haegyeolsa" Released: May 9, 1998; 2. "Eusha! Eusha!" Released: May 9, 1998; 3. "Sharing Forever" Released: May 9, 1998

Troubleshooter or Resolver (Korean: 해결사; RR: Haegyeolsa) is the debut studio album by South Korean boy band Shinhwa. It was released on May 9, 1998, by SM Entertainment. The album spawned three singles that were promoted with music videos and live performances on music programs: the title track "Resolver", "Eunsha! Eunsha!", and "Sharing Forever". The album was only moderately successful upon its release, selling around 86,000 copies by September 1998.

== Background and promotion ==
The group first performed the lead single, "Resolver" on KMTV's Show! Music Tank. The second single from the album was "Eusha! Eusha!". Because "Eusha! Eusha!" was a lighter song in comparison to "Resolver", which was a dark mood song, it appealed more to the mainstream listener, and climbed up the charts quicker. Shinhwa released their third single, "Sharing Forever", which charted fairly modestly as well.

== Music videos ==
=== "Resolver" ===
In the music video for "Resolver" (Korean: 해결사; Haegyeolsa), Shinhwa can be seen wearing matching shiny yellow outfits, dancing on a swinging platform. The storyline that follows the music video can be linked to the American movie, Terminator, with Seoul, South Korea being destroyed by a huge blast of fire. A girl can be seen in the music video, walking with a man following her. As the music video progresses, the man shows the girl various clips and pictures ranging from the holocaust to even Marilyn Monroe.

=== "Eusha! Eusha!" ===
In contrast to their first single, Shinhwa's "Eusha! Eusha!" (Korean: 으싸! 으싸!), which was a remake of Manfred Mann's song "Doo Wa Diddy", was a bouncy song, with the members dressing in white and blue costumes. The music video was filmed near a beach, with the members dressed in the Los Angeles Lakers Uniforms with Kobe Bryant's jersey #8. "Eusha! Eusha!" was Shinhwa's first bubblegum pop song, with the members showing a different side to them in the music video, from jumping around to playing in the water.

=== "Sharing Forever" ===
With "Resolver" being a dark song and "Eusha! Eusha!" a light-hearted song, "Sharing Forever" (Korean: 천일유혼; Cheon Il Yoo Hoon) is considered a sad song. The music video features Eric Mun, the leader of Shinhwa, as a photographer, taking pictures in the park when he stumbles upon a blind girl. She becomes his model and he falls in love with her, only to accidentally kill her in a car accident, thus causing him to fall into depression and grief. The girl later returns as a ghost with restored vision, and visits Eric while he is sleeping. He wakes up, feeling her presence, and eventually embraces her.

== Controversy ==
Although their debut album was a moderate success, Shinhwa was met with accusations that they were just a copy of another popular boy-band at the time, H.O.T, although the two came from the same entertainment company. Shinhwa were often compared to H.O.T., with some critics accusing them of just "trying to win over the hearts of H.O.T.'s fans."

== Track listing ==
No.	Title	Lyrics	Music	Arrangement	Length
1.	"Resolver" (Korean: 해결사; Haegyeolsa)	Yoo Young-jin; Eric Mun	Yoo Young-jin	Yoo Young-jin	3:39
2.	"Eusha! Eusha!" (Korean: 으쌰! 으쌰!)	Yoo Young-jin	Yoo Young-jin	Yoo Young-jin	3:32
3.	"Sharing Forever" (Korean: 천일유혼; Cheon-il Yoo Hoon)	Yoo Young-jin	Yoo Young-jin, DJ Freddy	Yoo Young-jin, DJ Freddy	3:52
4.	"Rock & Roll Summer!!"	Jason Kang	Jay Kim	J. Kim	4:20
5.	"Neul Naega Weonha neun Geoseun" (Korean: 늘 내가 원하는 것은)	Im Ka-cheol, Eric Mun	K.C. Im	J. Kim	4:24
6.	"Tears" (Korean: 눈물; Noonmool)	Gaki, E. Mun	Gaki	Gaki	3:22
7.	"Kiga Jalatsseoyo" (Korean: 키가 자랐어요)	Na Kyeong-seon, E. Mun	Shin In-soo	Fuzzy Kim	3:51
8.	"Bisanggu" (Korean: 비상구)	Son Nak-hui, E. Mun	N.H. Son	N.H. Son	3:30
9.	"Nue" (Korean: 누에)	N.H. Son, E. Mun	N.H. Son	N.H. Son	3:42
10.	"Thanks" (Korean: 감사; Kamsa)	Kim Myeong-jik, E. Mun	M.J. Kim	M.J. Kim	4:53

Note: E.Mun is short for Eric Mun, Shinhwa's leader.

== Personnel ==
Credits are adapted from the liner notes of Resolver.

=== Production ===
- Lee Soo-man – executive producer
- Yoo Young-jin – music coordinator
- KAT – recording engineer, mixing engineer, mastering engineer
- Kim Young-hoon – recording engineer
- Kim Ki-byeol – recording engineer
- Yeo Doo-hyeon – recording engineer
- Andy in Canada – recording engineer

=== Guitar ===
- Kim Seong-soo – "Resolver", "Sharing Forever"
- Kim Jeong-bae – "Kamsa"

=== Saxophone ===
- Lee Jeong-sik – "Sharing Forever"

=== Keyboard ===
- Lee Ik-seong – "Kamsa"
- Kim Myeong-jik – "Kamsa"

== Release history ==
Country	Date	Distributing label	Format
South Korea	May 5, 1998	SM Entertainment, Synnara Records, King Records	CD (KSC-8008)
Japan	September 19, 2001	Avex Trax (renamed Shinhwa)	CD (AVCD-18015)
