= Shinhwa =

South Korean boy band

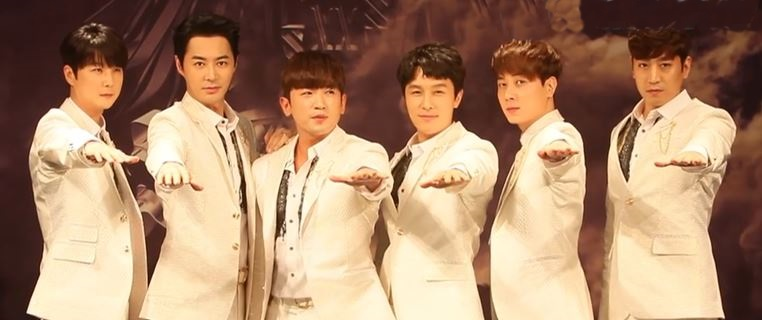
- Shinhwa in 2018

Background information
- Origin: South Korea
- Genres: K-pop; R&B; dance; hip-hop; electropop
- Years active: 1998–present
- Labels: SM; Good; Shinhwa Company
- Formerly of: SM Town
- Spinoffs: Shinhwa WDJ
- Members: Eric Mun; Lee Min-woo; Kim Dong-wan; Shin Hye-sung; Jun Jin; Andy Lee
- Website: Shinhwa Company

Korean name
- Hangul: 신화
- Hanja: 神話
- RR: Sinhwa
- MR: Sinhwa

Shinhwa (Korean: 신화) is a South Korean six-member boy band based in Seoul, composed of Eric Mun, Lee Min-woo, Kim Dong-wan, Shin Hye-sung, Jun Jin, and Andy Lee. Launched by SM Entertainment on March 24, 1998, the group signed with Good Entertainment in 2004 before creating their Shinhwa Company to manage their career as a band. The band struggled initially with their first album before finding commercial success with their sophomore album T.O.P. (April 1999). When their contract with SM Entertainment expired in July 2003, all six members signed with Good Entertainment and assumed creative control with the release of Brand New (August 2004). That same year, members began to pursue individual careers.

After a four-year hiatus due to majority of the members completing their mandatory military service, the sextet established the Shinhwa Company to facilitate their group career. The release of their tenth album The Return (2012) made them the first Korean boy band to continue performing after the members' mandatory military services. Shinhwa is also the first K-pop idol group to lead a successful career after leaving its original agency, despite being embroiled in legal battles with SM Entertainment over the name "Shinhwa" for several years. Over the course of their twenty-year career, Shinhwa have released thirteen Korean studio albums, one Japanese album, and various compilation albums.

The group is the longest-running boy band in the history of K-pop and is often referred to as part of the "First Generation of K-pop", alongside H.O.T., S.E.S., g.o.d, Fin.K.L, among others. Their work and longevity have served as influences to future generations of K-pop idol groups, leading many to describe the band itself as "legendary".

== History ==
=== 1998–2001: Formation, commercial struggles, and mainstream breakthrough ===
With the already established acts of H.O.T. and S.E.S., SM Entertainment sought to release another group to capitalize on the two formers' successes. Composed of members Mun Eric, Lee Min-woo, Kim Dong-wan, Jun Jin, Shin Hye-Sung, and Lee Andy, the group was named Shinhwa, the Korean word for myth or legend, and made their debut with Resolver on May 9, 1998. The album was supported by three singles: the titled track, "Eusha! Eusha!" (Hangul: "으쌰! 으쌰!"), and "Sharing Forever" (Hangul: "천일유혼"). Resolver's chart performance was lackluster, however, and Shinhwa was accused of lacking originality and duplicating label mate H.O.T.'s sound. The group also became embroiled in controversies when the 1998 Sokcho submarine incident occurred, and "Eusha! Eusha!, which was about a fun trip at the beach, was used as a reminder of the event. Although Shinhwa won Best New Artist at the Mnet Asian Music Awards, Resolver underperformed commercially, and the sextet almost disbanded.

Shinhwa's found mainstream success with their next few albums. Their sophomore album, T.O.P. (April 1999), was met with positive reviews for its title song and the group's edgier concept. A second single, "Yo", was promoted but did not fare as well. The album debuted at No. 4 and peaked at No. 3, selling 377,500 copies and charting for 24 weeks on the Korean monthly chart. The group received the Best Music Video from a New Male Pop Group award from the Mnet Asian Music Awards.

Only One (May 2000) became their first to debut at the top of the chart. Buoyed by three singles, "Only One", "All Your Dreams", and "First Love", it sold over 423,000 copies, and Shinhwa won three awards that year: the SBS Gayo Popularity Award, the KMTV song Bonsang Award, and the Popular Singers Award. That January, Shinhwa held their first concert, First Mythology. Shinhwa's fourth album, Hey, Come On!, was released on June 8, 2001, debuting at No. 3 and was promoted with two singles: "Hey, Come On!" and "Wild Eyes", the latter of which spawned various dance covers due to its choreography incorporating the use of chairs. The album was a commercial success, selling over 430,700 copies and ranked No. 11 on the 2001 year-end chart. Shinhwa was also associated with several controversies at the time, including scrutiny over the absence of member Andy and the alleged copying of Shinhwa's popular single, "Hey, Come On!" by Taiwanese boy band, Energy.

=== 2002–2003: Making history, change in management, and solo activities ===
Their first compilation album, My Choice (January 2002), featured some of the members' favorite songs and some of their most popular tracks. In contrast to Hey, Come On!'s strong sales, My Choice was met with moderate success, selling more than 171,300 copies while debuting and peaking at No. 4 before it dropped from the Korean monthly Chart. On the Year-End Chart, My Choice ranked No. 31, selling a total of 183,000 copies. A few months after the release of My Choice, Shinhwa released their fifth studio album, Perfect Man, on March 29, 2002. The album marked the return of member Andy. Perfect Man debuted atop the Korean monthly chart, becoming Shinhwa's second chart-topping album. Along with the title track, the group promoted the album with the second single "I Pray 4 U". Final sales were over 355,000 copies and the album was ranked No. 14 on the year end Top 100 Albums in 2002 Chart, with over 362,00 copies sold.

Shinhwa made history in the Korean music industry by becoming the longest-running Korean boy band with the release of its sixth album, Wedding (December 2002). The album debuted and peaked at No. 3 and sold over 273,700 copies. Wedding also marked the expiration of their contract with SM Entertainment, who offered all the members except Dongwan a second contract. The group collectively chose to sign with Good Entertainment, resulting in a court battle to retain the use of their name, which they won. Because the contract with Good Entertainment would not begin until 2004, members pursued solo activities in 2003: Min-woo went solo under the name "M," releasing his first album entitled Un-touch-able, while Hye-sung collaborated with Kangta and Lee Ji-hoon for a project group S. Jun Jin branched out into acting with the drama Forbidden Love alongside actress Kim Tae-hee. Andy and Jun Jin participated in a Korean sitcom Nonstop 4 as well as Banjun Drama. Eric began acting in dramas soon after acting in several CFs. Shinhwa is the first to have its members promote as solo artists while still continuing group activities. The members too strived in the solo activities.

The members regrouped and released the compilation album Winter Story 2003–2004 on December 30, 2003, which sold over 100,000 copies. They held their second concert The Everlasting Mythology from April 18 to 20, 2003, and also embarked on the Winter Story Tour, traveling to six cities: Seoul, Pusan, Daejeon, Incheon, Daegu, and Kwangju. They later traveled to Japan for the Shinhwa First Live in Tokyo, holding a Japanese fan meeting called Have Fun With Shinhwa On M.Net Tour.

=== 2004–2006: Creative control, commercial success, and first Asia Tour ===
Shinhwa's first album with Good Entertainment, Brand New (August 2004), debuted at No. 3 on the monthly Korean chart, peaking at No.1 in November and selling over 320,000 copies. The album saw increased creative control by the members, with Eric and Min-woo contributing to its production and Jun Jin with the choreography, leading to more dance songs being included in the final release instead of their usual pop music. The album was promoted with four singles: "Angel", "Oh!", "Crazy", and title track, and ranked No. 4 on the 2004 year-end chart. It won several accolades for the group, including Best Artist of The Year for the first time at the Seoul Gayo Daesang Awards. Several weeks later, on December 29, Shinhwa was awarded their second daesang at the 2004 SBS Gayo Daejun Awards, winning two of the possible four daesang in that year with Rain and Lee Soo Young receiving the other two. In 2004, of all musical artists and groups, Shinhwa received the most awards, totaling thirteen or more, from various places: the m.net KMTV Music Video Festival, Seoul Gayo Daesang, Golden Disc Awards and MBC, KBS, SBS Gayo Awards. The awards other than Best Artist of the Year included Best Male Artist, Best Dance Artist, and Overseas Choice Award.

After the success of Brand New, Shinhwa embarked on a tour, holding a Korea-China-Japan summer camp called Shinhwa Summer Story 2004. The camp was dedicated entirely for their non-Korean fans. Although, Shinhwa was mostly on hiatus throughout 2005, they released two popular singles, "How Do I Say" and "Hey Dude!" and held the Tropical Summer Story Festival concert. For a majority of 2005, Shinhwa hosted a reality show called Let's Coke Play Battle Shinhwa!, a competition to find the next Shinhwa, with the winning group debuting as the short-lived boy band Battle under Good Entertainment. To end the year, Shinhwa released Winter Story 2004-2005, which sold over 102,300 copies.

After renewing their contract with Good Entertainment for another 3 years, the group's State of the Art was released on May 11, 2006. The album debuted atop the chart and sold over 215,600 copies domestically. Brand New and State Of The Art became their first consecutive No. 1 albums, with the latter becoming the third best selling album in 2006, behind SG Wannabe's The 3rd Masterpiece and TVXQ's "O"-Jung.Ban.Hap.. Following a performance at Tokyo's Budokan Hall to celebrate the founding of Mnet Japan, their Japanese language album Inspiration #1 and the lead single, "This is the Sun in Our Hearts" released on June 14, 2006. The album released in Japan on August 16 peaked at No. 4 on Oricon Chart, selling in excess of 100,000 copies each. Shinhwa later embarked on their first Asia tour, Shinhwa 2006 Tour: State of the Art, kicking off with two concerts at the Olympic Gymnastics Arena, Seoul and visiting Japan, China, Singapore, Hong Kong, Thailand and other countries. They also performed at Budokan Hall in Tokyo, and Osaka-jo Hall on September 24 and 26, as part of the 2006 Japan Tour Inspiration#1.

=== 2007–2012: Solo activities, 10th anniversary, and mandatory military service ===
In 2007, members expanded their solo activities even further while Shinhwa was on hiatus, with each members starting their own company – M Rising (Min-woo), New Dream Entertainment (Andy), JF Story Entertainment (Jun Jin), H2 Entertainment (Dong-wan), and Top Class Entertainment (Eric) – to manage their solo careers. Dong-wan also released his first album entitled Kim Dongwan is on July 5, 2007. Min-woo released his third album on July 10, 2007 and though he had intended to release his third album in the U.S., he released it in Korea instead. Hye-sung released his second album on August 8, 2007.

Although their ninth album was set to be released in October 2007, it was ultimately delayed and they released Winter Story 2007 on December 6, 2007, which debuted at No. 3 and sold 24,500 copies. Shortly after the release of Winter Story 2007, Shinhwa staged their Asia Concert with a two-day performance on the December 8 and 9 in Saitama, Japan, followed by a concert in Shanghai. Celebrating their anniversary, Shinhwa staged a 10th anniversary concert and released their ninth studio album Volume 9. Because the concert was the last concert before the members left for the army, all 22,000 seats available for the concert were sold out.

After their 10th anniversary and the release of their 9th album, the members continued to work on their individual activities until their mandatory military service, with Eric enlisting in October 2008 and Dong-wan in November at Gongju, Chungcheongnam-do Both served non-active duty, e.g. they were public service workers, after undergoing four weeks of basic training. Jun Jin enlisted on October 22, 2009, at the Nonsan military camp in Chungcheongnam-do Province for four weeks of basic training and continued as a public service worker. On January 11, 2010, Andy enlisted for mandatory military service and was the only member to serve 21 months of active duty. Min-woo was the last of the members to enlist in February 2010. He also served non-active duty after undergoing four weeks of basic training. Hye-sung was exempt from military service due to serious and recurring injuries in his knee sustained during a concert in 2001.

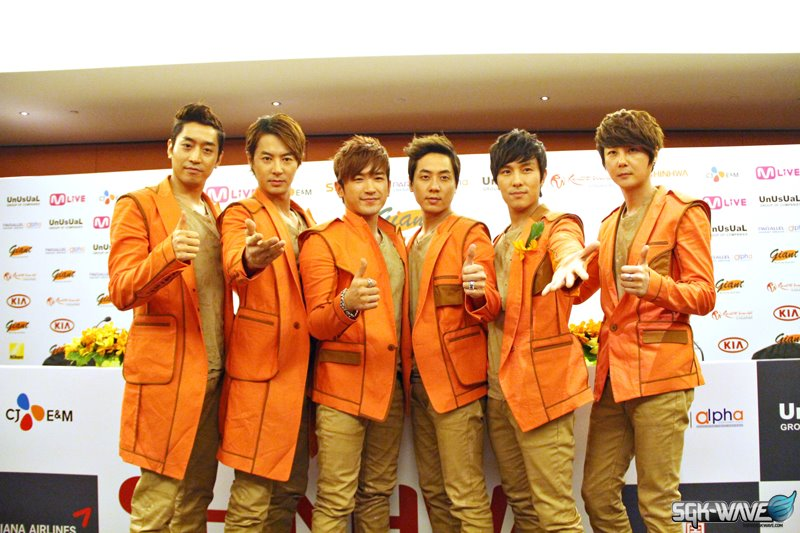
Shinhwa in 2012

On October 30, 2010, Eric was discharged from military service. Dong-wan was discharged on December 17 after serving 24 months as an administrative worker at the Seodaemun-gu District Office. Andy was discharged from active duty on October 31, 2011, from the Ministry of National Defense in Yongsan-gu, Seoul. Jun Jin was discharged on November 14, 2011, after working at the Gangnam Management Corporation, managing the culture center's fitness club and parking lot. This was followed by Min-woo on March 2, 2012, after serving as a public service officer in Seoul Station.

=== 2012–2017: Shinhwa Company and touring ===
After their contract with Good Entertainment expired, Shinhwa created their own company to manage their activities as a group, with Eric and Min-woo as co-CEOs and the remaining members as shareholders. Members' individual activities continue to be manage by their respective agencies. A press conference to launch Shinhwa's comeback was held on March 5, 2012, at CGV cinema in Cheongdam-dong, which was streamed live by Mnet Media. The group released their tenth studio album The Return on March 23, 2012. To promote the album, Shinhwa embarked on the 2012 Shinhwa Grand Tour in Seoul: The Return, which kicked off at Olympic Gymnastics Arena on March 24 and 25, 2012, and continued with shows in Japan, China, Taiwan and Singapore. They also hosted their first exclusive variety program, Shinhwa Broadcast, which aired on cable channel JTBC. The producers held a public shoot and press conference to showcase the program.

The following year, Shinhwa resumed their music activities as a group with the release of their 11th studio album and 15th anniversary concert in March, in addition to the 2013 Shinhwa 15th Anniversary Concert: The Legend Continues at the Olympic Gymnastics Arena in March. On the same day information on ticketing and a teaser video were released. The 25,000 tickets were sold out within five minutes of going on sale, by over 300,000 people who tried to buy the tickets. Their eleventh album The Classic was released on May 16, 2013, followed by an Asian concert tour, 2013 Shinhwa Grand Tour: The Classic in support of the album.

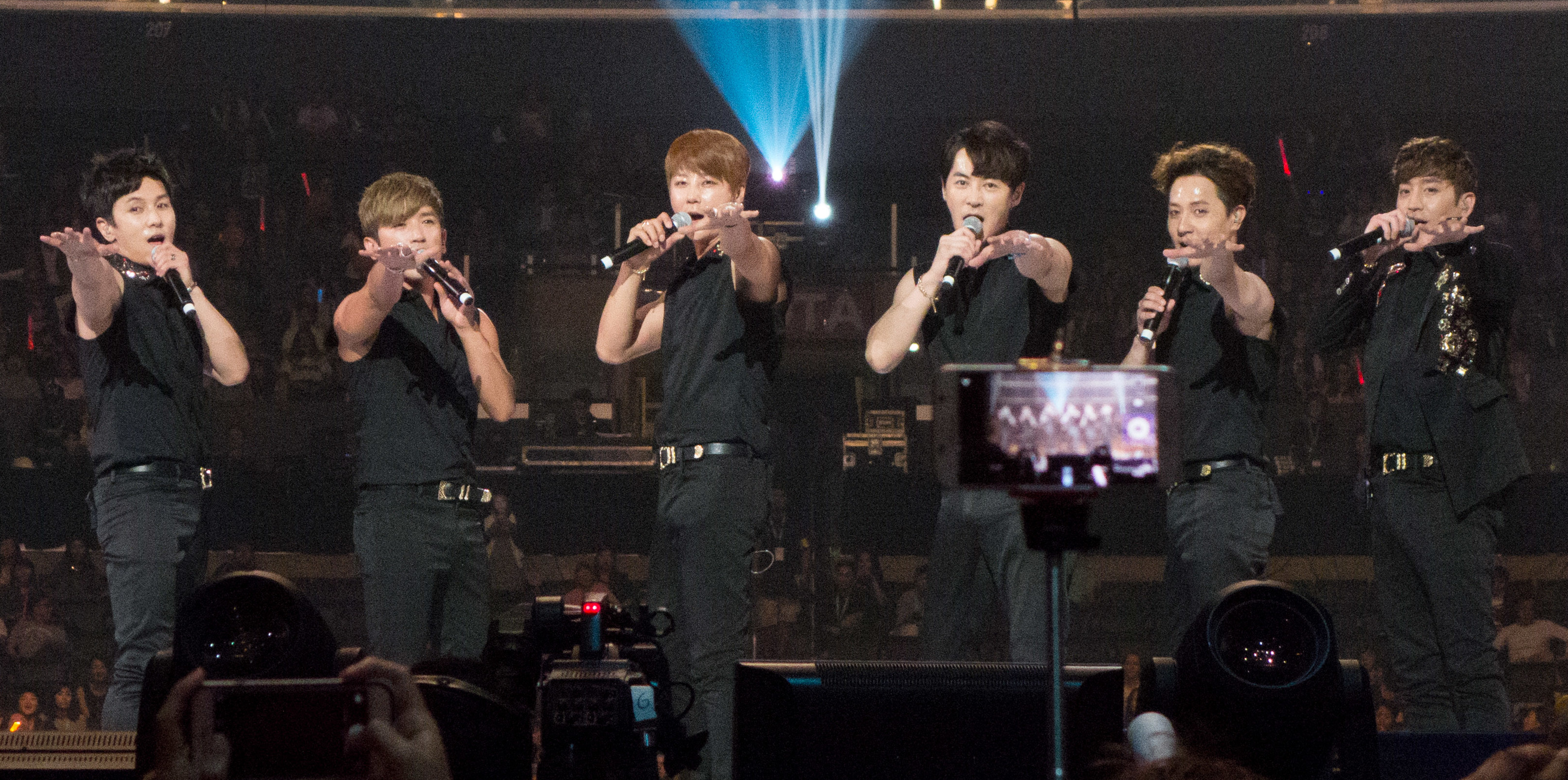
Shinhwa performing at KCON 2015

Their 16th anniversary concert, Here, was held on March 22–23, 2014 at the Olympic Park Gymnastics Stadium, which sold out its 27,000 seats and crashed the website server. Due to a gambling scandal, however, Andy was absent from the shows, making a surprise appearance during the last show to apologize to the audience.

In 2015, Shinhwa announced it would be appearing on Seoul Broadcasting System (SBS)'s 800th Inkigayo episode, including the return of Andy from his extended hiatus. This was followed by the release of their album in over two years, We (February 2015). The LDN Noise-produced lead-single "Sniper" rose to the top of five real-time music charts, Bugs, genie, Olleh Music, Mnet, and Cyworld, and the music video for the single reached over a million YouTube views within two weeks of the song's release. Shinhwa also won the Show Champion for the song "Sniper" on March 11, 2015. Their thirteenth album, Unchanging, was released on January 1, and peaked at No. 3 on the World Albums Chart. They held their 17th anniversary concert 'WE' on March 21 and 22 in Korea, and went on to hold concerts in various parts of China. They held their 17th anniversary FINALE concert 'WE SHINHWA' on August 22 and 23 in Korea. On May 29, Shinhwa won the trademark rights to their group name after 12 years. The members expressed their joy upon earning their name back after years of legal battle.

=== 2018–present: 20th anniversary and Shinhwa WDJ ===
KSPO Dome before their concert in 2018

In commemoration of their 20th anniversary, Shinhwa released a re-recorded darker version of their song "All Your Dreams" from the album Only One, in addition to filming a new music video. They also kicked off a fan meeting party from March 24–25 to signal the start of their 20th anniversary project, All Your 2018 and performed for KBS Music Bank's twentieth anniversary alongside other artists.

On August 28, they released their album, Heart, with the title track "Kiss Me Like That" and promoted on music shows for three consecutive weeks. Their 20th anniversary concert, Heart Tour in Seoul, which will take place October 6–7, sold out within 5 minutes and crashed the website's servers upon ticket release. On April 20 and 21, 2019, they held their 21st anniversary concert, Chapter 4. On August 17, 2022, Liveworks Company announced Shinhwa's first sub-unit, Shinhwa WDJ, which consisted of Minwoo, Dongwan and Junjin, to debut this winter. The release schedule for the album Come to Life was released on December 6.

== Legacy ==
Shinhwa is the longest-running Korean boy band in existence, and is often listed as one of the legendary "first generation" K-pop idol groups including H.O.T., S.E.S., Sechs Kies, Fin.K.L, and g.o.d. Although the word shinhwa means myth or legend, the group themselves have been described as a "legendary" K-pop idol group for their longevity, and their constant change in image and rebranding have been credited for their continued success. Shinhwa was the first K-pop group to try a lot of new things: from being an idol-actor, to radio DJ, to branching out as solo artists while still being active as a group.

When they debuted, the trend at the time was for male idol group members to remain "mysterious" and "dark", a concept the group utilized when promoting their early materials. They rebranded themselves when the "flower boy" concept, which describes "young males with pretty faces and 'unpretentious cuteness'", became popular; they have continued to adjust their images as they age, incorporating suits and polished haircuts into their looks later on. Shinhwa's intense dance moves have also become one of their staples, with their song "Wild Eyes" spawning various dance covers due to its choreography incorporating the use of chairs and the choreography for "Venus" being described as "high intensity". Shinhwa were also credited for pioneering vogue dancing in Korea. With the rise of competition from the "second generation" of idol groups in South Korea, Shinhwa began to make a foray into Asia in 2005, embarking on tours and fan meetings. They were voted as the Best Korean Singer Overseas twice in poll held by Arirang International Broadcasting. The poll allowed only foreigners to vote, with Shinhwa's songs "Once in a Lifetime" in 2006 and "Pretty" in 2007 topping the polls.

Shinhwa's popularity have also led to the creation of the official fan club, Shinhwa Changjo. The color orange has been associated with Shinhwa Changjo ever since its establishment in 1998, and is used in both Shinhwa's official and unofficial merchandise, including light-sticks, balloons, raincoats, and various kinds of apparels and accessories. These orange-colored cheering tools are used in each member's individual promotion activities as well. Similar to the band, Shinhwa Changjo is the longest running Korean fan club, and upon the release of their 12th album in February 2015, Shinhwa opened the recruitment for the 10th wave of its official fanclub. Shinhwa does not have an official light-stick like other groups, instead they have a new light-stick for every concert Shinhwa holds.

Their work have inspired newer generations of artists, including 2PM, Big Bang, Dreamcatcher, EXID, MAP6, and Seventeen, many who strive to one day last as long as the sextet. Kangta, a member of H.O.T., have also praised the group for choosing to switch labels when SM Entertainment offered contracts to all but one member instead of splitting up, a rare action among idol groups.

== Discography ==
- Resolver (1998)
- T.O.P. (1999)
- Only One (2000)
- Hey, Come On! (2001)
- Perfect Man (2002)
- Wedding (2002)
- Winter Story (2003)
- Brand New (2004)
- Winter Story 2004–2005 (2004)
- State of the Art (2006)
- Inspiration #1 (In Japan) (2006)
- Volume 9 (2008)
- The Return (2012)
- The Classic (2013)
- We (2015)
- Unchanging (2017)

== Controversy ==
=== "Hey, Come On!" ===
In July 2002, Taiwanese boy band Energy covered Shinhwa's song, "Hey, Come On!" causing tensions between the fans of Shinhwa and Energy. As it was later noted, Jeff Vincent and Peter Rafelson who wrote "Hey, Come On!" had sold the song to Energy, therefore, it was legal. Even so, fans of Shinhwa were angry over that fact. The Taiwanese group 5566 also covered Shinhwa's "Dark", a song included in Shinhwa's 4th album.

=== Leaving SM Entertainment ===
In 2003 SM Entertainment's 5-year contract with Shinhwa ended. Lee Soo Man, the head of SM Entertainment, offered contract renewals to all but Dongwan. Choosing to sign with a new agency instead, the choice sparked controversies when Lee denied their permission to use the name Shinhwa with the different company. At the height of the battle in September 2014, the band had to rename the agency Shinhwa Company as ShinCom Entertainment to avoid legal issues. In May 2015, after 12 years of legal battles, Shinhwa finally won the lawsuit over Joon Media and re-renamed their agency as Shinhwa Company. Open World Entertainment CEO, Seok-Woo Jang, holder of the rights to the name of Shinhwa, granted permission to use the name as long as they perform together as a group. Open World held the rights to Shinhwa's overseas concerts with Shinhwa Company, and overseas licensing of the group's albums. The heads of Top Class Entertainment and Liveworks Company are directors of Shinhwa Company, with the former in charge of promotion and management in general, and the latter providing support regarding albums, concerts and promotions.

Awards and achievements
Preceded by Rain	Gayo Daejun Award for Daesang (=Best Prize); 2004	Succeeded by Kim Jong Kook
Preceded by Lee Hyori	15th Seoul Music Awards – Daesang (=Best Prize) Award; 2004	Succeeded by TVXQ
