= Shin Hye-sung =

South Korean singer-songwriter (born 1979)

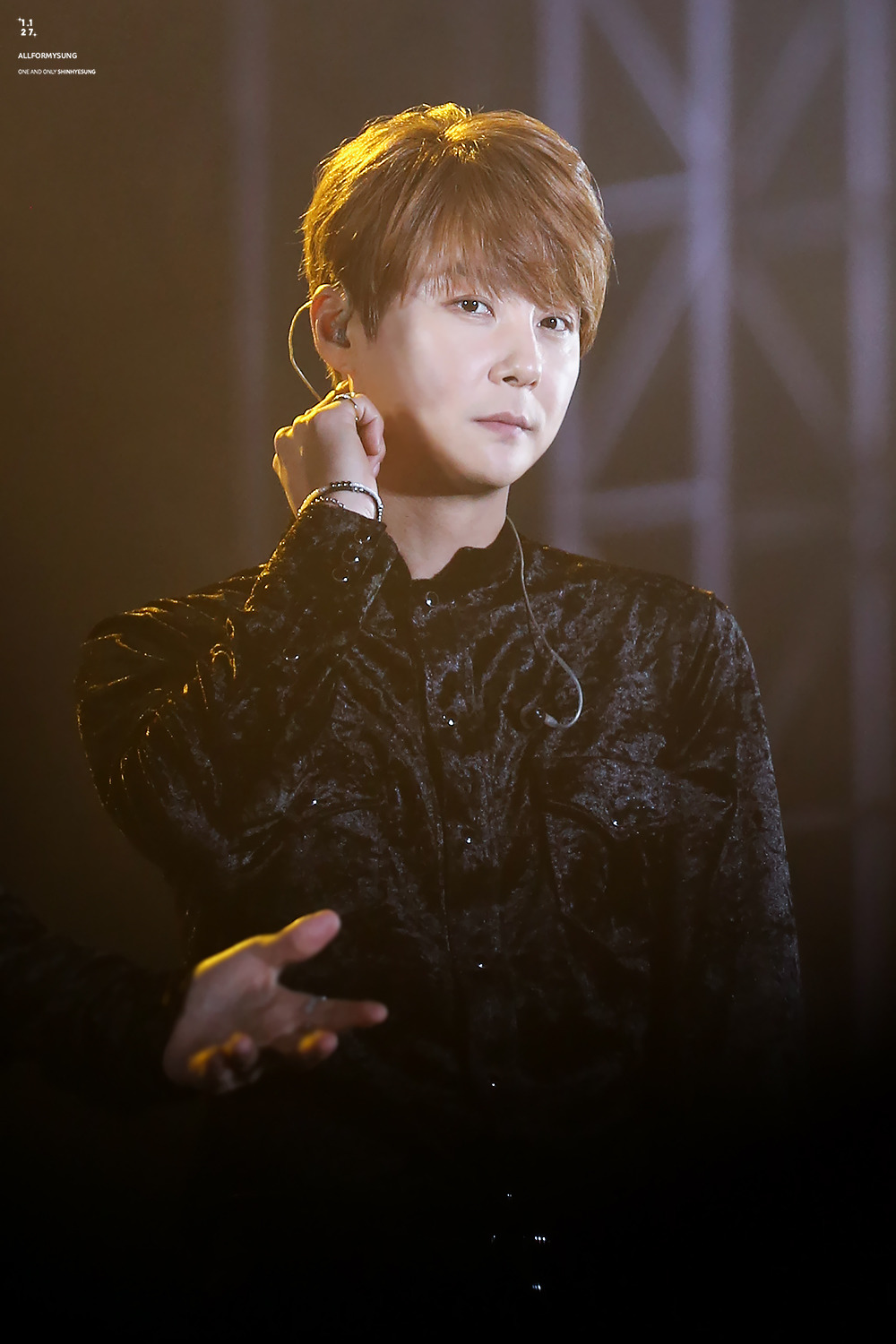
- Shin in 2016

Background information
- Born: Jung Pil-kyo; November 27, 1979 (age 46); Seoul, South Korea
- Occupation: Singer-songwriter
- Musical career
- Genres: K-pop; J-pop; Korean ballad
- Instrument: Vocals
- Years active: 1998–present
- Labels: Good Entertainment; Live Works; Tokuma Japan Communications; Shinhwa Company; Universal D

Korean name
- Hangul: 정필교
- Hanja: 鄭弼敎
- RR: Jeong Pilgyo
- MR: Chŏng P'ilgyo

Stage name
- Hangul: 신혜성
- Hanja: 申彗星
- RR: Sin Hyeseong
- MR: Sin Hyesŏng

Jung Pil-kyo (Korean: 정필교; born November 27, 1979) is a South Korean singer-songwriter. He is best known as a member of the South Korean boy group Shinhwa. The main vocalist of Shinhwa, he debuted as a solo artist in 2005 and has since released multiple albums in both Korean and Japanese.

== Biography ==
=== 1998: Debut with Shinhwa ===
Shin auditioned in America through Brothers Entertainment and joined Shinhwa after bandmates Andy and Eric. He officially debuted as part of Shinhwa on March 24, 1998, with a performance of their first single "해결사" (The Solver) on KM Music Tank. Since then, he has released thirteen Korean and one Japanese studio albums with Shinhwa.

=== 2005: Solo career ===
Shin debuted as a solo artist in 2005 with the release of his solo album entitled Love of May (오월지련, 五月之戀) in 2005. This album ranked number one on the HMV pre-order sales chart in Japan in February 2005, with 180,000 copies sold. Shin released his second album, entitled The Beginning, New Days on August 8, 2007. His song, "First Person", was No. 1 on the K-pop Top 10 chart. His album sold 30,000 copies on its first day of release and 50,000 copies in a week.

He has since released five Korean and two Japanese studio albums.

In June 2011, after releasing his fifth Korean studio album, The Road Not Taken, Shin wrapped up a series of performances in Seoul, Busan, and Shanghai. He also hosted a special two-day, 2011 Tour in Seoul – The Road Not Taken Act II, at Kyung Hee University on September 3 and 4. Then in July, he recorded a duet "I Believe," with Shunsuke Kiyokiba former member of Exile.

=== 2012: Shinhwa comeback ===
In March 2012, Shin reunited with his Shinhwa bandmates for their comeback after four years, under the management of 'Shinhwa Company'. It is a joint venture agency for members to perform as a group, of which Eric and Lee Min-woo are co-CEOs and the remaining members are shareholders. The Company manages the group as a whole, whilst members' individual activities are managed by their respective agencies. The group released their tenth studio album The Return on March 23, 2012, launched their comeback concerts 2012 Shinhwa Grand Tour: The Return throughout Asia and their first exclusive variety program Shinhwa Broadcast premiered on March 17, 2012, on cable channel JTBC.

On March 25, during the encore performance of the 2012 Shinhwa Grand Tour in Seoul: The Return, Shin injured his knee. At the start of the performance of "Yo!", he was shot up on stage but did not land safely. He ruptured his cruciate ligament and severely damaged the cartilage and ligament surrounding the meniscus, requiring surgery and six weeks of rest. Shin had previously ruptured his cruciate ligament again, an injury previously sustained during a concert in 2001, and had corrective surgery on his left knee but the cruciate ligament in his right knee continued to suffer damage, for which he was exempt from mandatory military service. However, he has put off surgery, but has continued treatment through the end of promotional activities for Shinhwa's tenth studio album, The Return. He performed by singing in a chair for their first music show comeback on March 29 on M Countdown, where they performed "Venus" and "Hurt".

In September Shin along with bandmate Lee Min-woo performed at the West Bank Music Festival in Shanghai from September 30 to October 2, as K-Pop representatives along with other international artists such as Michael Bolton in front of an audience of 100,000 people.

=== 2019–2024: Hiatus and Legal Issues ===
From June 3, 2019 to February 21, 2021, Shin Hyesung hosted the SBS Radio show, Shin Hyesung's music odyssey. He took a hiatus due to worsened throat conditions. In January 2022, fellow bandmember Andy Lee was married. Shin, despite speculation that he did not attend, was later revealed to have had even worsened health. His band member shared, on the television show SBS Same Bed, Different Dreams 2 "Among our members, Hyesung hyung isn't very healthy. He hurt his legs and his vocal cords aren't in prime condition. But despite him feeling under the weather, he came to my wedding. I was touched."

On October 11, 2022, Shin was found sleeping inside a parked vehicle in the middle of a road. Police arrived and he was brought in for questioning. The car in which he was sleeping was previously reported stolen. In December, KBS suspended Shin Hyesung along with several other celebrities. Shin Hyesung was initially sentenced to 1 year of probation for possession of a stolen vehicle and refusing a breathalyzer test. In 2023, prosecution appealed the "lenient" sentence and sought a 2 year prison sentence instead. However, in April, 2024, the court upheld the initial 1 year of probation. On May 10, 2024, his sentence was finalized as neither he nor the prosecution submitted an additional appeal.

== Personal life ==
=== Military service ===
On January 12, 2001, Shin injured his left knee while rehearsing for Shinhwa's first solo concerts, which were held on January 13 and 14. Despite the injury, he participated in the concerts as scheduled. He was subsequently diagnosed with a complete rupture of the anterior cruciate ligament in his left knee and underwent reconstructive surgery on April 18.

He was later exempted from mandatory military service on medical grounds because of the injury.

== Discography ==
- 2005: 五.月.之.戀 (Love of May)
- 2007: The Beginning, New Days
- 2008: Live and Let Live
- 2009: Keep Leaves
- 2010: Find Voice in Song
- 2011: The Road Not Taken
- 2011: Embrace
- 2012: Winter Poetry
- 2016: Delight
- 2017: Serenity
- 2019: Setlist

== Compositions ==
1. Shinhwa Vol. 2 "Forever With You (너의 곁에서)"
2. Shinhwa Vol. 3 "Never Come To Me" (co-writer)
3. Shinhwa Vol. 3 "Vortex" (co-writer)
4. Shinhwa Vol. 3 "Wedding March"
5. Shinhwa Vol. 4 "Hey, Come On"
6. Shinhwa Vol. 4 "Falling in Love"
7. Shinhwa Vol. 4 "Sure I Know"
8. Shinhwa Vol. 4 "바램 ( I Swear)"
9. Shinhwa Vol. 6 " You (노을)"
10. Shinhwa Vol. 7 "Oh" (co-wrote song lyrics with Minwoo)
11. Shinhwa Vol. 9 "Destiny of Love (흔적)"
12. Shinhwa Vol. 10 "Let It Go" (co-wrote song lyrics with Eddie Shin)
13. Shin Hye Sung Vol. 1 "Don't Leave" (co-writer with JPS)
14. Shin Hye Sung Vol. 1 "Same Thought" (co-writer with Park Chang Hyun)
15. Shin Hye Sung Vol. 1 "Punishment (벌)" (co-writer with Kim Do Hyun)
16. Shin Hye Sung Vol. 1 "A Song For You"
17. Shin Hye Sung Vol. 1 "After... "
18. Shin Hye Sung & Lyn [He Said... She Said...] "Echo"
19. Group S Fr. in Cl "I Swear" (wrote English lyrics)
20. Group S Fr. in Cl "I Believe"
21. S.E.S Vol. 1 "Good-Bye" (Rap by Eric)
22. S.E.S Vol. 2 "Kiss" (Rap by Eric)

Other participation: Shinhwa Vol. 8 "Midnight Girl" (New melody arrangements for ballad version)

== Variety shows ==
Year	Title	Role	Notes
2004–2005	Love Letter	Contestant with Shinhwa	(Season 1, Episode 1–14)
2004–2005	Let's Coke Play Battle Shinhwa!	Host with Shinhwa	
2012–2014	Shinhwa Broadcasting	Main Cast with Shinhwa	(Episode 1–70)

== Music shows ==
- 2012 KBS Immortal Songs
- 2013 MBC Remocon

== Awards ==
Year	Awards
2005	2005 Mnet Asian Music Awards Best Ballad Performance; Golden Disk Award "Bonsang"; SBS Gayo Daejun "Bonsang"
2007	Golden Disk Award "Bonsang"; Melon Music Awards "Artist of the Year Award"; Melon Music Awards "Music Video of the Year Award"
2008	Sohu Entertainment Sohu Han Yu's 2007 Awards: Annual Best Album; Sohu Entertainment Sohu Han Yu's 2007 Awards: Best MV; 2007 Model Ceremony Award: Popularity Award
2014	China Top Hits Awards: "Popular Asian Singer"
