= 100% (band) =

South Korean boy band

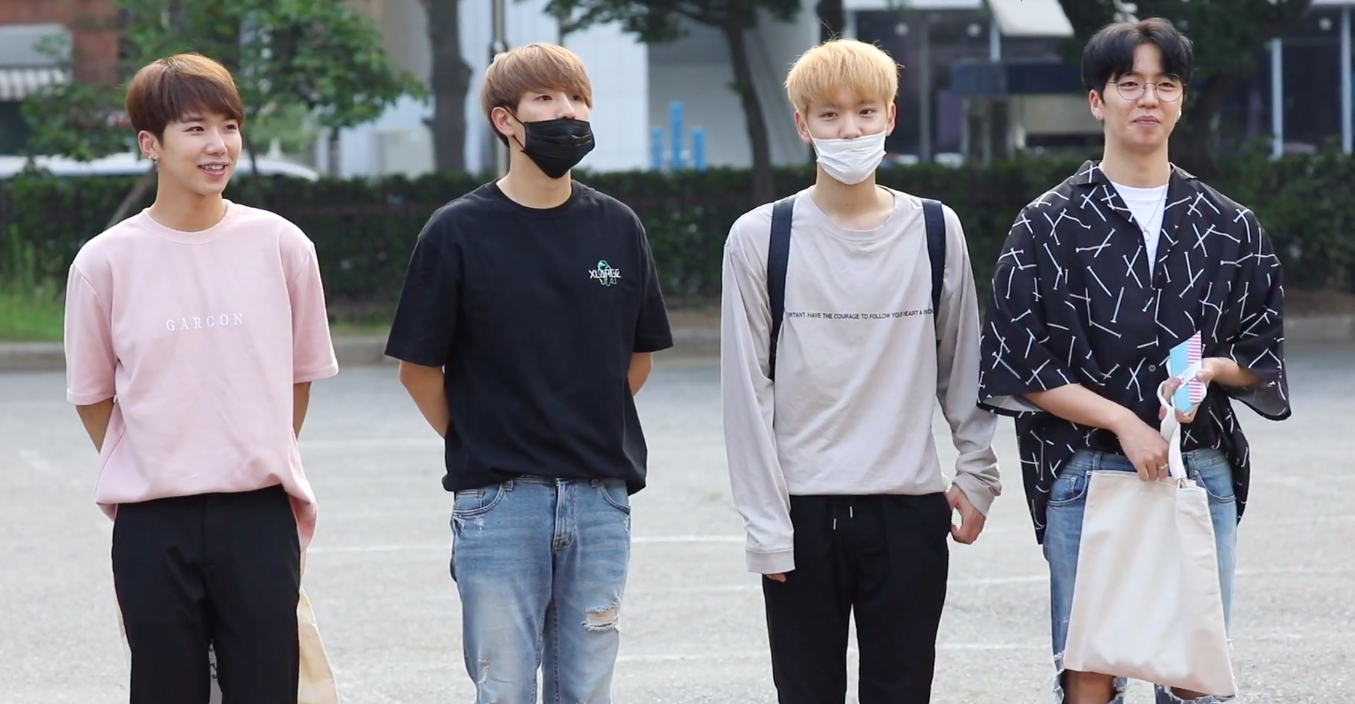
- 100% in July 2018

Background information
- Origin: Seoul, South Korea
- Genres: K-pop
- Years active: 2012–2021
- Label: TOP Media
- Spinoffs: 100% V; Fave1
- Past members: Minwoo; Rockhyun; Jonghwan; Chanyong; Changbum; Hyukjin; Sanghoon

Korean name
- Hangul: 백퍼센트
- Hanja: 百퍼센트
- RR: Baekpeosenteu
- MR: Paekp'ŏsent'ŭ

100% (Korean: 백퍼센트) was a South Korean boy band formed by Shinhwa's Andy Lee under TOP Media in 2012. The group debuted in September 2012 with their single album, "We, 100%". The group consisted a total of seven members: Minwoo, Rockhyun, Jonghwan, Chanyong, Changbum, Hyukjin and Sanghoon. Throughout their career, Sanghoon took time off from the group since 2014, Changbum departed from the group in 2016 while Minwoo died in March 2018 due to cardiac arrest. The group disbanded on October 9, 2021, after the members' contracts expired.

== Career ==
=== Pre-debut ===
In 2009, Rockhyun—under the stage name Rocky (Korean: 로키)—was in Andy Lee's duo Jumper (Korean: 점퍼) along with Park Dong-min that released two singles: "Yes!" featuring Eric of Shinhwa and "Dazzling" (Korean: 눈이 부셔) featuring Kang Ji-young.

The same year, Minwoo was featured during Andy Lee's promotion for his song "Single Man," along with Park Dong-min (Korean: 박동민). Minwoo had also been active as an actor. He starred in KBS2's 2006 drama Sharp 3 (Korean: 반올림3), SBS's 2007 drama The King and I and in two movies, Crazy Waiting (2007) and Where Are You Going? (Korean: 특별시 사람들) (2009).

=== 2012–2013: Debut and sub-unit ===
Between June and September 2012, 100% were featured in SBS MTV's variety show Teen Top Rising 100% (Korean: 틴탑의 뜬다 백퍼), in which they starred alongside fellow TOP Media artist Teen Top and its founder Andy Lee. Their debut single album "We,100%" was released on September 18. It consists of four tracks, including the instrumental version of "나쁜놈 (Bad Boy)", which were all written and produced by Super Changddai. The same day, the music video for its lead track "나쁜놈 (Bad Boy)" went online on the band's official YouTube channel. 100% made their live debut of "나쁜 놈 (Bad Boy)" on September 21 on KBS Music Bank, followed by MBC Music Core and SBS Inkigayo that same weekend.

On October 23, MBC held a press conference for 100% and Teen Top's second variety program in Jangan-dong, Seoul. Teen Top & 100% Rising Brothers (Korean: 틴탑&백퍼센트의 떴다 브라더스) premiered on MBC Music three days later, showing the two groups accomplishing missions. The group's first digital single "나 같은 놈 (Guy like me)", written by Minigun and Super Changddai, was released on December 7 along with its music video.

100% released their first extended play Real 100% and a music video for "Want U Back" on May 23, 2013. 100% V, a sub-unit consisting of Rockhyun, Jonghwan, and Hyukjin along with rapper Chanyong, was announced by TOP Media on November 14. The sub-unit released a single consisting of lead track "퇴근길 (Missing you)" and two others on November 20. They made their first live performance on Music Bank.

=== 2014–2016: Minwoo's military service and members departure ===
In February 2014, TOP Media announced on both 100%'s official website and fancafe that leader Minwoo had to enlist in the Korean military starting on March 4. In March, the agency announced that Sanghoon will take some personal time off until he finalizes on what to do in the future. With five members remaining, 100% released their second extended play Bang the Bush and music video for "Beat" (심장이 뛴다) on March 17. On July 7, the five members released their second single album, "100% Cool Summer Album 'SUNKISS'" with the title track being, "니가 예쁘다 (U beauty)", and it debuted three times on the Gaon chart in the following weeks of July after its release that same year.

On September 12, 2016, TOP Media made an official announcement that Changbum had left the group. The remaining members would continue as five and prepare for a comeback in October. 100% released their third extended play Time Leap and a music video for "Better Day" (지독하게) on October 13.

=== 2017–2019: Japanese debut, The Unit, Minwoo's death, Sunshine, RE:tro, and military service ===
100% making their Japanese debut with released single "How to Cry" in January 2017. The group later released their fourth mini album Sketchbook on February 22, with the title track, "Sketch U" (어디 있니). On June 28, 100% released their second Japanese single "Warrior". In October, it was confirmed all members of 100% would be competed in The Unit. Member Rockhyun and Hyukjin passed the audition. Hyukjin was eliminated in 34th place due the second elimination round while Rockhyun did not enter on TOP9 and only finished in 14th place due the final round.

100% released their third Japanese single "Song for You" on February 14, 2018 On March 25, 2018, it was reported that Minwoo had died from cardiac arrest at his home at the age of 33. On April 2, it was announced that 100% would resume career and their mini tour announced before Minwoo's death. 100% released their fourth Japanese single "Summer Night" on June 27. On July 26, 100% made their first Korean comeback in over a year and a half with the digital single "Grand Bleu", then they announced the fifth mini album release, Sunshine, with title track named "맘 (Heart)".

100% carried on with their Japanese promotion and released their fifth Japanese single "28°C". After that, they held "Walking On The Clouds" concerts from January 25 to 27, 2019.

On March 14, 100% released their fifth mini album RE:tro, with the title track "Still Loving You", and promoted their comeback in Korea.

On June 25, it was announced that all four members would be enlisting during the latter half of the year. Rockhyun and Chanyong enlisted on July 15, Jonghwan on July 22, and Hyukjin on August 26.

=== 2021: Disbandment ===
On September 23, 2021, TOP Media announced that 100% would disband after the expiration of their contracts on October 9.

On September 27, before their disbandment, they released their last single, "Can't say goodbye" (아름다운 걸).

== Members ==
Adapted from the official website:

=== Former ===
- Minwoo (민우) (2012–2018, his death)
- Rockhyun (록현) (2012–2021)
- Jonghwan (종환) (2012–2021)
- Chanyong (찬용) (2012–2021)
- Changbum (창범) (2012–2016)
- Hyukjin (혁진) (2012–2021)
- Sanghoon (상훈) (2012–2014)

== Discography ==
=== Extended plays ===
List of extended plays, with selected chart positions and sales
Title	Album details	Peak chart positions		Sales
Title	Album details	KOR	JPN	Sales
Real 100%	Released: May 23, 2013; Label: TOP Media; Format: CD, digital download; Track listing: 1. Real 100%; 2. Want U Back; 3. Only U 4. Flavor; 5. Why	3	—	KOR: 9,783+
Bang the Bush	Released: March 17, 2014; Label: TOP Media; Format: CD, digital download; Track listing: 1. Heart; 2. Beat (심장이 뛴다); 3. You & I (너와 나); 4. Super Man; 5. Bad Girl; 6. Phone (전화)	4	—	KOR: 11,915+
Time Leap	Released: October 13, 2016; Label: TOP Media; Format: CD, digital download; Track listing: 1. Better Day (지독하게); 2. Cause U (너라서); 3. No Goodbye (안녕이라는 말은 싫어); 4. Not Today (오늘 같은 날); 5. Ugly (내 마음이 참 못돼서); 6. Better Day (지독하게) (Inst.)	4	—	KOR: 14,576+
Sketchbook	Released: February 22, 2017; Label: TOP Media; Format: CD, digital download; Track listing: 1. Sketch U (어디 있니); 2. One Day (어느날); 3. Dreaming (해몽); 4. Gorgeous; 5. Meet Yesterday (어제의 나를 만나다); 6. Sketch U (어디 있니) (Inst.)	5	—	KOR: 13,261+
Sunshine	Released: September 3, 2018; Label: TOP Media; Format: CD, digital download; Track listing: 1. Sunshine; 2. Heart (맘); 3. Grand Bleu; 4. Turn Away (돌아서지만); 5. Because of You (너 때문에); 6. So What (어쩌라고); 7. Heart (맘) (Inst.)	6	46	JPN: 1,494+; KOR: 17,156+
RE:tro	Released: March 14, 2019; Label: TOP Media; Format: CD, digital download; Track listing: 1. Still Loving You; 2. I'm Sorry (다 미안해); 3. The Truth Is (사실); 4. Remember (그 시간); 5. One Love; 6. To.	3	39	JPN: 1,611; KOR: 22,416
"—" denotes releases that did not chart or were not released in that region.

=== Singles ===
List of singles, with selected chart positions, showing year released and album name
Title	Year	Peak chart positions				Sales	Album
Title	Year	KOR			JPN	Sales	Album
Title	Year	Album	Digital	Hot	JPN	Sales	Album
"Bad Boy" (나쁜 놈)	2012	6	112	—	—	KOR: 6,080+ (Phy.); KOR: 26,921+ (Dig.)	We, 100%
"Guy Like Me" (나 같은 놈)	2012	—	76	—	—	KOR: 35,258+ (Dig.)	Non-album single
"Want U Back"	2013	—	108	—	—	KOR: 25,656+ (Dig.)	Real 100%
"퇴근길 (Missing you)" by 100% V	2013	7	84	82	—	KOR: 25,843+ (Dig.); KOR: 4,504+ (Phy.)	100% V
"Beat" (심장이 뛴다)	2014	—	66	97	—	KOR: 24,696+ (Dig.)	Bang The Bush
"니가 예쁘다 (U beauty)"	2014	5	62	55	—	KOR: 8,285+ (Phy.); KOR: 33,965+ (Dig.)	Sunkiss
"Better Day" (지독하게)	2016	—	—	—	—	—N/a	Time Leap
"Sketch U" (어디 있니)	2017	—	—	—	—	—N/a	Sketchbook
"Grand Bleu"	2018	—	—	—	—	—	Non-album single
"맘 (Heart)"	2018	—	—	—	—	—	Sunshine
"Still Loving You"	2019	—	—	—	—	—N/a	RE:tro
"Can't say goodbye" (아름다운 걸)	2021	—	—	—	—	—N/a	Non-album single
Japanese
"How To Cry"	2017	—	—	—	12	JPN: 9,974+	Non-album single
"Warrior"	2017	—	—	—	12	JPN: 8,777+	Non-album single
"Song For You"	2018	—	—	—	10	JPN: 17,322+	Non-album single
"Summer Night"	2018	—	—	—	7	JPN: 15,339+	Non-album single
"28°C"	2018	—	—	—	12	JPN: 11,985+	Non-album single
100% V (sub-unit)
"Missing You"	2013	—	—	—	—		100% V
"—" denotes releases that did not chart or were not released in that region.

== Videography ==
=== Music videos ===
Year	Song	Director
2012	"Bad Boy"	Kim Hye-Jung
2012	"Still Again"	Jonghwan and Minwoo (100%)
2012	"나 같은 놈 (Guy like me)"	Minigun and 슈퍼창따이 (Super Changddai)
2013	"Want U Back"	Hyuk Shin & Ross Lara
2013	"Only U"	Stereo (KOR)
2013	"퇴근길 (Missing you)"	Brave Brothers
2014	"Beat"	슈퍼창따이 (Super Changddai)
2014	"Phone"	박준용 (Park Jun Yong)
2014	"U Beauty"	Solver and 220 Volt
2014	"Summer Hero"	Troubleshooter
2016	"Better Day"	Sweetune
2017	"Sketch U"	Sweetune
2018	"Grand Bleu"	찬용 (Chanyong) (100%)
2018	"Heart"	찬용 (Chanyong) (100%) and 김이나 (Kim Eana)
2019	"Still Loving You"	Han Gil
Japanese
2017	"How To Cry"	Unknown
2017	"Warrior	Unknown
2018	"Song For You"	Unknown
2018	"Summer Night"	Unknown
2018	"28°C"	Unknown

== Filmography ==
=== Television ===
Year	Title	Note(s)
2012	Teen Top Rising 100%	Cast members with Teen Top and Andy
2012	Pops in Seoul's 'New Star.com'	Featured artist
2012	Teen Top & 100% Rising Brothers	Cast members with Teen Top

== Concerts and tours ==
=== Tours ===
Date	City	Country	Venue	Tour
December 24, 2013	Fukuoka	Japan	Fukuoka Convention Center	ZEPP Tour - 100% X'mas Show
December 25, 2013	Osaka	Japan	Namba Hatch	ZEPP Tour - 100% X'mas Show
December 27, 2013	Tokyo	Japan	Zepp Tokyo	ZEPP Tour - 100% X'mas Show
June 16, 2018	Tokyo	Japan	Differ Ariake	100% Premium Showtime 2018 ~Summer Night~
June 17, 2018	Tokyo	Japan	Differ Ariake	100% Premium Showtime 2018 ~Summer Night~
June 23, 2018	Nagoya	Japan	Nagoya International Legend Hall	100% Premium Showtime 2018 ~Summer Night~
June 30, 2018	Osaka	Japan	Zepp Osaka Bayside	100% Premium Showtime 2018 ~Summer Night~

=== Concerts ===
Date	City	Country	Venue	Concert
August 24, 2013	Tokyo	Japan	Shinagawa Stellar Ball	Live Event in Japan Real 100%
December 29, 2013	Seoul	South Korea	Blue Square Samsung Card Hall	1st Solo Concert - All 100%
January 18, 2014	Taipei	Taiwan	ATT Show Box	All 100% in Taiwan
July 20, 2014	Chiba	Japan	Maihama Amphitheater	100% 2014 Japan Cool Live
October 5, 2014	Tokyo	Japan	Laforet Museum Roppongi	100% 2014 Japan Fall In Live
December 24, 2016	Osaka	Japan	Osaka Business Park Enkei Hall	100% Xmas Live 2016 "LOVE%"
December 25, 2016	Tokyo	Japan	Meiji Yasuda Seimei Hall	100% Xmas Live 2016 "LOVE%"
March 14, 2017	Tokyo	Japan	Billboard Live Tokyo	100% Premium Live - "White Love"
March 17, 2017	Osaka	Japan	Billboard Live Osaka	100% Premium Live - "White Love"
April 21, 2018	Tokyo	Japan	Yamano Hall	100% Spring Concert 2018 -Blossom-
April 30, 2018	Osaka	Japan	Osaka Business Park Enkei Hall	100% Spring Concert 2018 -Blossom-
December 24, 2018	Tokyo	Japan	Shibuya Cultural Center Owada Densho Hall	100% Special Winter Stage 2018 "28°C"
January 25, 2019	Seoul	South Korea	CKL Stage	100% Walking On The Clouds
January 26, 2019	Seoul	South Korea	CKL Stage	100% Walking On The Clouds
January 27, 2019	Seoul	South Korea	CKL Stage	100% Walking On The Clouds

=== Showcases ===
Date	City	Country	Venue	Showcase
November 20, 2016	Tokyo	Japan	Nicofarre	100% Showcase in Japan - 'Time Leap'
January 22, 2017	Osaka	Japan	HEP Hall	100% "How To Cry" Japan Showcase
January 29, 2017	Tokyo	Japan	Nicofarre	100% "How To Cry" Japan Showcase
