= Jang Hee-jin =

South Korean actress (born 1983)

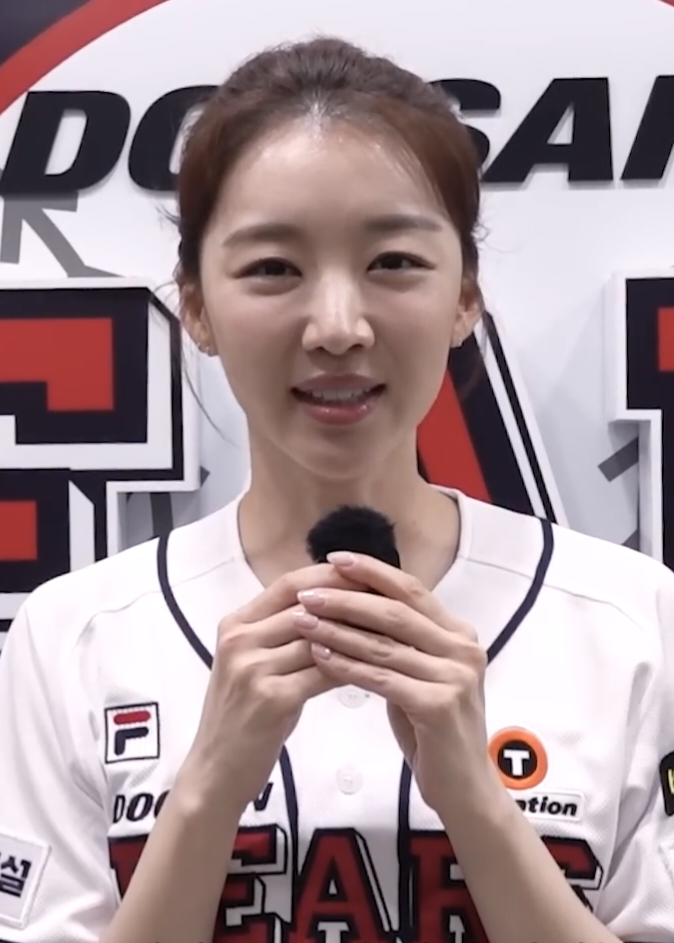
- Jang in 2024
- Born: May 9, 1983 (age 43); Incheon, South Korea
- Other name: Jang Hie-jin
- Education: Kyung Hee Cyber University – Hotel Management (2002); Konkuk University – Performing Arts (2012)
- Occupation: Actress
- Years active: 2003–present
- Agent: Makestar

Korean name
- Hangul: 장희진
- Hanja: 張熙軫
- RR: Jang Huijin
- MR: Chang Hŭijin

Jang Hee-jin (Korean: 장희진; born May 9, 1983) is a South Korean actress. She began her career as a model for the fashion magazines CeCi, Marie Claire, and Cindy the Perky. Jang has appeared in several television series and films, including Myung-wol the Spy and Big.

== Filmography ==
=== Film ===
Year	Title	Role	Ref.
2006	APT	Yu-jeon	
2006	Marrying the Mafia III	Ahn Ju-ri	
2006	Gangster High	Jung Soo-hee	
2007	Crazy Waiting	Nam Bo-ram	
2008	Rough Cut	Eun-seon	
2011	The Showdown	Seo-hyun	
2014	A Girl at My Door	Eun-jung	
2014	Confession	Ji-hyang	
2014	The End of the World	su-yeon	

=== Television series ===
Year	Title	Role	Ref.
2004	Nonstop 5	Hee-jin	
2004	Toji, the Land	Yang-hyeon	
2005	Hello My Teacher	Oh Eun-byul	
2005	MBC Best Theater "One Fine Day"	Soon-young	
2005	Banjun Drama "Camera Phone"		
2005	Banjun Drama "Masked Warrior"		
2005	Banjun Drama "Jung-min's Younger Brother, Kyung-min"		
2005	Banjun Drama "Unseen Love"		
2007	Que Sera Sera		
2008	Drama City "The Love Revenger – Miss Jo"	Jo Seon-ju	
2008	Our Happy Ending		
2008	Seoul Warrior Story	So Chung-bi	
2009	Hilarious Housewives	Jang Hee-jin	
2009	Hometown of Legends "Come with Me to Hell"	Soo-jin	
2011	TV Literature "My Mother and Her Guest"	Sun-hwa	
2011	Spy Myung-wol	Joo In-ah	
2011	What's Up	Eun Chae-young	
2012	Big	Lee Se-young	
2012	Seoyoung, My Daughter	Jung Sun-woo	
2013	Thrice Married Woman	Lee Da-mi	
2014	KBS Drama Special "The Three Female Runaways"	Yeo-jin	
2015	The Scholar Who Walks the Night	Soo-hyang	
2015	The Village: Achiara's Secret	Kim Hye-jin	
2016	Secret Healer	Queen Shim	
2016	On the Way to the Airport	Kim Hye-won	
2017	Introverted Boss	Seo Yeon-jung	
2017	You Are Too Much	Jung Hae-dang	
2018	KBS Drama Special "Such a Long Farewell"	Jung Yi-na	
2019	Babel	Han Jeong-won	
2020	Flower of Evil	Do Hae-soo	
2021	The Red Sleeve	Queen Jeongsun	
2023	Pandora: Beneath the Paradise	Go Hae-soo	

=== Music video appearances ===
Year	Title	Artist(s)	Ref.
2005	"Another Side of Memory"	Boohwal	
2005	"Prayer to Overcome Sadness"	Boohwal	
2008	"Obsession"	Moon Hee-joon	
2010	"Sad Music"	Brave Brothers	
2011	"Good Night"	HITT	

== Discography ==
=== Singles ===
Year	Title	Artist	Album
2012	"Sweet Imagination"	K.Will and Jang Hee-jin	The Duet 2nd Week (EP)

== Awards and nominations ==
Name of the award ceremony, year presented, category, nominee of the award, and the result of the nomination
Award ceremony	Year	Category	Nominee / Work	Result	Ref.
Korea Jewelry Awards	2010	Emerald Award	—N/a	Won	
MBC Drama Awards	2017	Excellent Award, Actress in a Weekend Drama	You Are Too Much	Won	
