= I Am the Mother Too =

2018 South Korean television series

- Promotional Poster
- Hangul: 나도 엄마야
- Lit.: I'm a Mother Too
- RR: Nado eommaya
- MR: Nado ŏmmaya
- Genre: Family; Melodrama
- Created by: Hong Chang-wook (SBS Drama Division)
- Written by: Lee Geun-young
- Directed by: Bae Tae-seop
- Starring: Lee In-hye; Woo Hee-jin; Alex Chu; Park Joon-hyuk; Moon Bo-ryung
- Music by: Choi Jeong-joo
- Country of origin: South Korea
- Original language: Korean
- No. of episodes: 124 (Note: Originally scheduled to air for 120 episodes, the series was extended by four episodes in lieu of six preempts.)

Production
- Producer: Park hyung Ki
- Camera setup: Single-camera
- Running time: 30 minutes
- Production company: The Story Works

Original release
- Network: SBS TV
- Release: May 28 – November 23, 2018

I Am the Mother Too (Korean: 나도 엄마야; RR: Nado eommaya) is a 2018 South Korean television series starring Lee In-hye, Woo Hee-jin, Alex Chu, Park Joon-hyuk, and Moon Bo-ryung. The series airs daily on SBS from 8:40 a.m. to 9:10 a.m. (KST).

== Plot ==
A story of a woman who is a surrogate mother, overcoming hardships and hurts, finding true love and happiness, and how her maternal love transcends bloodline.

== Cast ==
=== Main ===
- Lee In-hye as Yoon Ji-young
- Woo Hee-jin as Choi Kyung-shin
- Alex Chu as Shin Sang-hyuk
- Park Joon-hyuk as Shin Hyun-joon
- Moon Bo-ryung as Oh Hye-rim

=== Supporting ===
==== Chairman Shin's family ====
- Park Geun-hyung as Shin Tae-jong
- Yoon Mi-ra as Lim Eun-ja
- Song Yoo-an as Yeo Min-kyung
- Joo Sang-hyuk as Shin Tae-woong

==== People around Ji-young ====
- Hong Yeo-jin as Jo Young-ran
- Jung Kyung-soon as Yoon Ki-sook
- Jung Han-heon as Ji Dong-man
- Jung Joo-won as Ji Bong-kyu
- Yoo In-hyuk as Ji Se-young
- Yoon Seo-hyun as Kang Sung-nam
- Park Joon-seok as Young-kyu

==== Extended ====
- Kim Tae-hee as prof. Kim Seon-jeong
- Ji Chan as Jung Jin-kook
- Lee Jung-hoon as chief Moon
- Yoon Seung-hoon as Park Chang-hoon
- Kim Chang-hwan as Han Dong-soo
- Kim Eun-hye as Noh Mi-hyun
- Choi Yeo-won as Jung Eun-chae
- Park Ga-ram as Jenny

== Ratings ==
- In this table, The blue numbers represent the lowest ratings and the red numbers represent the highest ratings.
- NR denotes that the drama did not rank in the top 20 daily programs on that date.
- N/A denotes that the rating is not known.

Ep.	Original broadcast date	Average audience share			
Ep.	Original broadcast date	TNmS Ratings		AGB Nielsen	
Ep.	Original broadcast date	Nationwide	Seoul National Capital Area	Nationwide	Seoul National Capital Area
1	May 28, 2018	9.5%	6.7%	7.5% (12th)	6.8% (15th)
2	May 29, 2018	9.1%	6.0%	7.2% (10th)	6.6% (15th)
3	May 30, 2018	9.0%	5.8%	6.5% (10th)	5.9% (14th)
4	May 31, 2018	9.8%	7.1%	6.9% (11th)	6.5% (13th)
5	June 1, 2018	9.1%	6.3%	7.1% (14th)	6.5% (15th)
6	June 4, 2018	8.7%	5.8%	7.0% (13th)	6.4% (18th)
7	June 5, 2018	8.7%	5.9%	7.0% (9th)	6.6% (12th)
8	June 6, 2018	7.3%	4.2%	6.4% (14th)	6.0% (13th)
9	June 7, 2018	8.0%	5.3%	7.1% (9th)	6.8% (9th)
10	June 8, 2018	8.4%	5.8%	7.7% (11th)	7.1% (12th)
11	June 11, 2018	9.2%	6.7%	6.9% (16th)	—N/a
12	June 14, 2018 (Note: No episodes were aired on June 12 due to the special news coverage of the North Korea–United States Summit in Singapore, and on June 13 due to the South Korean local elections.)	8.8%	6.2%	6.7% (12th)	6.0% (14th)
13	June 15, 2018	9.7%	7.4%	7.3% (13th)	6.3% (13th)
14	June 18, 2018	8.0%	5.6%	6.5% (17th)	6.2% (16th)
15	June 19, 2018	9.0%	6.7%	7.5% (7th)	6.8% (9th)
16	June 20, 2018	8.1%	5.8%	7.0% (9th)	6.3% (15th)
17	June 21, 2018	8.5%	6.3%	7.4% (9th)	6.9% (8th)
18	June 22, 2018	8.8%	6.7%	8.4% (10th)	7.6% (12th)
19	June 25, 2018	9.5%	7.5%	7.3% (11th)	6.2% (19th)
20	June 26, 2018	9.3%	7.2%	7.7% (12th)	7.0% (15th)
21	June 27, 2018	9.6%	7.6%	7.8% (12th)	7.2% (14th)
22	June 28, 2018	10.2%	8.3%	8.2% (10th)	7.0% (12th)
23	June 29, 2018	9.7%	7.9%	7.6% (12th)	6.8% (13th)
24	July 2, 2018	9.7%	7.8%	7.5% (16th)	6.6% (20th)
25	July 3, 2018	9.8%	8.0%	7.5% (13th)	6.7% (18th)
26	July 4, 2018	9.4%	7.6%	7.5% (8th)	6.7% (9th)
27	July 5, 2018	9.8%	8.1%	8.3% (6th)	7.5% (6th)
28	July 6, 2018	9.7%	7.9%	8.0% (7th)	7.1% (8th)
29	July 9, 2018	9.5%	7.6%	8.1% (9th)	6.7% (17th)
30	July 10, 2018	9.4%	7.3%	7.5% (11th)	6.1% (17th)
31	July 11, 2018	10.2%	8.5%	7.4% (11th)	7.0% (9th)
32	July 12, 2018	10.0%	8.2%	8.3% (6th)	7.7% (6th)
33	July 13, 2018	10.2%	8.4%	7.3% (13th)	6.5% (12th)
34	July 16, 2018	9.8%	7.7%	7.9% (7th)	7.3% (12th)
35	July 17, 2018	9.7%	7.5%	7.2% (12th)	6.0% (16th)
36	July 18, 2018	9.7%	7.8%	7.5% (7th)	6.5% (9th)
37	July 19, 2018	10.0%	8.2%	7.9% (6th)	6.9% (7th)
38	July 20, 2018	10.4%	8.7%	7.8% (11th)	7.2% (11th)
39	July 23, 2018	10.1%	8.3%	7.5% (10th)	6.8% (15th)
40	July 24, 2018	10.2%	8.5%	7.6% (9th)	6.8% (13th)
41	July 25, 2018	10.1%	8.4%	7.9% (9th)	7.3% (9th)
42	July 26, 2018	9.7%	7.9%	8.0% (6th)	7.1% (8th)
43	July 27, 2018	10.5%	8.8%	7.9% (11th)	6.9% (11th)
44	July 30, 2018	9.6%	7.5%	7.6% (9th)	6.3% (15th)
45	July 31, 2018	9.1%	6.9%	7.4% (8th)	6.3% (12th)
46	August 1, 2018	8.5%	6.2%	7.7% (7th)	7.0% (8th)
47	August 2, 2018	9.0%	6.8%	8.0% (5th)	7.1% (7th)
48	August 3, 2018	8.9%	6.5%	7.9% (10th)	6.6% (12th)
49	August 6, 2018	8.7%	6.1%	7.3% (11th)	6.2% (16th)
50	August 7, 2018	9.3%	6.8%	7.7% (8th)	6.6% (12th)
51	August 8, 2018	8.6%	6.0%	7.8% (7th)	7.3% (6th)
52	August 9, 2018	9.5%	7.1%	8.2% (8th)	6.9% (10th)
53	August 10, 2018	9.5%	7.3%	8.2% (12th)	7.1% (12th)
54	August 13, 2018	9.4%	7.2%	8.1% (10th)	7.3% (11th)
55	August 14, 2018	9.9%	7.8%	7.9% (8th)	6.7% (10th)
56	August 15, 2018	8.3%	6.1%	7.2% (12th)	6.3% (15th)
57	August 16, 2018	10.5%	8.4%	8.0% (8th)	6.7% (10th)
58	August 17, 2018	9.6%	7.3%	8.8% (9th)	7.7% (11th)
59	August 20, 2018	9.3%	6.9%	8.6% (7th)	7.4% (9th)
60	August 21, 2018	9.9%	7.6%	8.2% (7th)	6.9% (11th)
61	August 22, 2018	9.9%	7.5%	7.8% (8th)	7.0% (11th)
62	August 23, 2018	10.6%	8.3%	8.5% (9th)	7.0% (11th)
63	August 27, 2018 (Note: No episode was aired on August 24 due to special news coverage of the typhoon Soulik.)	10.7%	8.8%	8.6% (8th)	7.2% (15th)
64	August 28, 2018	10.6%	8.6%	8.5% (8th)	7.4% (14th)
65	August 29, 2018	9.9%	7.6%	7.8% (14th)	7.0% (NR)
66	August 30, 2018	10.5%	8.3%	8.4% (7th)	7.1% (8th)
67	August 31, 2018	10.3%	8.0%	8.4% (9th)	7.1% (10th)
68	September 3, 2018	9.6%	—N/a	8.1% (12th)	6.9% (15th)
69	September 4, 2018	10.7%	—N/a	8.4% (7th)	7.4% (10th)
70	September 5, 2018	10.3%	—N/a	7.9% (7th)	6.9% (9th)
71	September 6, 2018	10.6%	—N/a	8.7% (5th)	7.5% (8th)
72	September 7, 2018	11.0%	—N/a	8.6% (10th)	7.4% (11th)
73	September 10, 2018	9.5%	—N/a	8.3% (9th)	7.0% (14th)
74	September 11, 2018	10.1%	—N/a	8.3% (7th)	7.1% (8th)
75	September 12, 2018	—N/a	—N/a	9.3% (5th)	8.6% (4th)
76	September 13, 2018	9.6%	—N/a	8.7% (6th)	7.5% (9th)
77	September 14, 2018	—N/a	—N/a	10.0% (7th)	8.6% (9th)
78	September 17, 2018	9.7%	—N/a	8.3% (8th)	6.8% (13th)
79	September 21, 2018 (Note: No episodes were aired on September 18–20 due to news coverage of the 3rd Inter-Korean Summit.)	10.0%	—N/a	8.9% (10th)	7.6% (11th)
80	September 24, 2018	—N/a	—N/a	3.2% (NR)	—N/a
81	September 25, 2018	7.2%	—N/a	6.1% (16th)	5.9% (16th)
82	September 26, 2018	7.8%	—N/a	7.2% (14th)	6.9% (14th)
83	September 27, 2018	10.2%	—N/a	9.2% (7th)	8.3% (8th)
84	September 28, 2018	10.7%	—N/a	9.2% (8th)	8.3% (11th)
85	October 1, 2018	9.6%	—N/a	8.9% (7th)	7.3% (14th)
86	October 2, 2018	10.2%	—N/a	8.7% (5th)	7.7% (6th)
87	October 3, 2018	—N/a	—N/a	7.8% (11th)	6.7% (15th)
88	October 4, 2018	—N/a	—N/a	9.3% (7th)	8.3% (8th)
89	October 5, 2018	—N/a	—N/a	9.6% (9th)	8.4% (10th)
90	October 8, 2018	9.6%	—N/a	9.2% (6th)	8.6% (7th)
91	October 9, 2018	9.1%	—N/a	7.8% (11th)	7.5% (12th)
92	October 10, 2018	9.4%	—N/a	9.4% (5th)	8.8% (5th)
93	October 11, 2018	10.8%	—N/a	9.3% (5th)	8.4% (8th)
94	October 12, 2018	10.0%	—N/a	8.6% (10th)	7.2% (13th)
95	October 15, 2018	10.4%	—N/a	8.7% (7th)	7.3% (10th)
96	October 16, 2018	11.1%	—N/a	9.5% (6th)	8.4% (7th)
97	October 17, 2018	10.2%	—N/a	9.3% (7th)	8.3% (6th)
98	October 18, 2018	10.9%	—N/a	9.5% (6th)	8.2% (10th)
99	October 19, 2018	11.0%	—N/a	9.3% (7th)	7.9% (9th)
100	October 22, 2018	10.6%	—N/a	8.6% (7th)	7.2% (9th)
101	October 23, 2018	10.7%	—N/a	8.7% (5th)	7.6% (9th)
102	October 24, 2018	10.5%	—N/a	9.8% (6th)	8.9% (6th)
103	October 25, 2018	10.9%	—N/a	9.2% (8th)	7.9% (11th)
104	October 26, 2018	11.9%	—N/a	9.5% (10th)	8.6% (11th)
105	October 29, 2018	10.8%	—N/a	9.5% (7th)	8.7% (7th)
106	October 30, 2018	11.0%	—N/a	10.1% (5th)	8.8% (6th)
107	October 31, 2018	11.5%	—N/a	9.6% (6th)	8.7% (7th)
108	November 1, 2018	11.2%	—N/a	9.9% (8th)	8.7% (12th)
109	November 2, 2018	9.5%	—N/a	7.2% (12th)	6.7% (13th)
110	November 5, 2018	10.7%	—N/a	10.2% (6th)	9.0% (7th)
111	November 6, 2018	11.3%	—N/a	9.8% (6th)	8.6% (6th)
112	November 7, 2018	—N/a	—N/a	9.3% (5th)	7.9% (10th)
113	November 8, 2018	—N/a	—N/a	10.1% (5th)	8.5% (13th)
114	November 9, 2018	—N/a	—N/a	10.3% (5th)	9.0% (8th)
115	November 12, 2018	11.2%	—N/a	9.6% (7th)	8.5% (8th)
116	November 13, 2018	11.5%	—N/a	9.4% (7th)	8.2% (9th)
117	November 14, 2018	11.0%	—N/a	9.4% (7th)	8.2% (10th)
118	November 15, 2018	11.2%	—N/a	9.5% (9th)	8.8% (10th)
119	November 16, 2018	11.3%	—N/a	9.5% (9th)	7.9% (12th)
120	November 19, 2018	11.6%	—N/a	9.2% (7th)	7.9% (9th)
121	November 20, 2018	10.8%	—N/a	10.2% (6th)	9.3% (7th)
122	November 21, 2018	11.4%	—N/a	9.8% (6th)	9.0% (6th)
123	November 22, 2018	11.8%	—N/a	10.3% (7th)	9.4% (7th)
124	November 23, 2018	12.0%	—N/a	10.0% (8th)	8.8% (7th)
Average		—	—	8.27%	—

== Awards and nominations ==
Year	Award	Category	Recipient	Result	Ref.
2018	SBS Drama Awards	Top Excellence Award, Actress in a Daily and Weekend Drama	Woo Hee-jin	Nominated	
2018	SBS Drama Awards	Excellence Award, Actor in a Daily and Weekend Drama	Alex Chu	Nominated	
