= Banjun Drama =

- Also known as: Good Sunday - Reverse Drama
- Genre: Drama, comedy, romance
- Country of origin: South Korea
- Original language: Korean
- No. of episodes: 87

Production
- Running time: Approx. 45 minutes per episode
- Production company: SBS

Original release
- Network: SBS
- Release: August 8, 2004 – April 23, 2006

Match! Reverse Drama (Korean: 대결! 반전 드라마; RR: Daegyeol! banjeon deurama) is a South Korean mini-drama series that first aired on August 8, 2004, as a part of SBS's Good Sunday programme. Each Reverse Drama is usually unrelated to previous dramas, unless it is split into parts, and generally has a large twist in the story at the end. The two mini-dramas compete by votes cast on the main site. Generally, the show invites celebrities to act in a very humorous and sarcastic way not seen in regular dramas. The program later changed its name to Reverse Theatre (Korean: 반전 극장), which featured a celebrity (TVXQ, Danny Ahn, Jun Jin) bearing the program's name. Despite the changes, the program ended on April 23, 2006, due to low ratings.

== List of episodes ==
Episode #	Airdate	Episode Title	Guests
1	August 8, 2004	Sweet Room (스위트룸)	Eric Mun, Chae Rim
1	August 8, 2004	Newlywed Couple Kidnapping Incident (신혼부부 납치사건)	Yoo Jae-suk, Jeong Jun-ha, So Yoo-jin
2	August 15, 2004	Geunyeon was Pretty (그녀는 예뻤다)	Yoo Jae-suk, Jeong Jun-ha, So Yoo-jin
2	August 15, 2004	Meet Princess Good-For-Nothing (공주 건달을 마나다)	Eric Mun, Han Ji-hye
3	August 22, 2004	Since That Day (그날 이후)	Eric Mun, Han Ji-hye
3	August 22, 2004	The Beaten Man (매맞는 남자)	Yoo Jae-suk, Jeong Jun-ha, So Yoo-jin
4	August 29, 2004	I Will Love You (사랑 할까요)	Eric Mun, Han Ji-hye
4	August 29, 2004	Three Wishes (세가지 소원)	Yoo Jae-suk, Jeong Jun-ha, So Yoo-jin
5	September 5, 2004	Dangerous Proposal (위험한 청혼)	Yoo Jae-suk, Jeong Jun-ha, So Yoo-jin
5	September 5, 2004	Love Thief (경찰과 도둑)	Eric Mun, Han Ji-hye
6	September 12, 2004	My Beloved Bodyguard (나를 사랑한 보디가드)	Eric Mun, Han Ji-hye
6	September 12, 2004	This Can Happen To You Too (당신에게도 일어날수 있는 일)	Yoo Jae-suk, Jeong Jun-ha, So Yoo-jin
7	September 19, 2004	Second Love (두번의 사랑)	Eric Mun, Han Ji-hye
7	September 19, 2004	Ghost (고스트)	Yoo Jae-suk, Jeong Jun-ha, So Yoo-jin
8	October 3, 2004	The Man Who Wants To Get Married (결혼하고싶은 남자)	Yoo Jae-suk, Jeong Jun-ha, So Yoo-jin
8	October 3, 2004	Rival (라이벌)	Eric Mun, Han Ji-hye
9	October 10, 2004	In Lovers In Paris(속 파리의 연인)	Yoo Jae-suk, Jeong Jun-ha, So Yoo-jin
9	October 10, 2004	His Double Life (그의 이중생활)	Eric Mun, Han Ji-hye
10	October 17, 2004	Lovers (연인)	Eric Mun, Han Ji-hye
10	October 17, 2004	The Man Who Cannot Kiss (키스를 못하는 남자)	Yoo Jae-suk, Jeong Jun-ha, So Yoo-jin, Ji Sang-ryeol
11	October 24, 2004	Scandal (스캔들)	Yoo Jae-suk
11	October 24, 2004	For Her Sake (그녀를 위하여)	Rain, Han Ji-hye
12	October 31, 2004	Something to Tell You Part 1 (하고 싶었던 말)	Rain, Han Ji-hye
12	October 31, 2004	A Winter Day's Fairy Tale (가을날의 동화)	Yoo Jae-suk
13	November 7, 2004	Something to Tell You Part 2 (하고 싶었던 말)	Rain, Han Ji-hye
13	November 7, 2004	Unbelievable Roommates (기막힌 동거)	Yoo Jae-suk, Jeong Jun-ha
14	November 14, 2004	Romance Solver (사랑의 해결사)	Rain, Son Tae-young, Jo Jung-rin
14	November 14, 2004	That Guy Was Cute (그놈은 귀여워다)	
15	November 21, 2004	Passionate Teacher (열혈 선생님)	Yoo Jae-suk, Lee Seung-gi, Jo Jung-rin
15	November 21, 2004	In My Little Bride (속 어린신부)	Yoon Kye-sang, Han Ji-hye, Jae Hee
16	November 28, 2004	Exclusive Love (사랑의 특종)	Yoo Jae-suk, Jeong Jun-ha, Jung Ryeo-won
16	November 28, 2004	Cute Hostage Part 1 (귀여운 인질)	Yoon Kye-sang, Han Ji-hye, Son Tae-young
17	December 5, 2004	Lottery Turmoil (복권 대소동)	Yoo Jae-suk, So Yoo-jin
17	December 5, 2004	Cute Hostage Part 2 (귀여운 인질)	Yoon Kye-sang, Han Ji-hye, Son Tae-young
18	December 12, 2004	Best of & NGs	
19	December 19, 2004		
20	December 26, 2004	Became An Old Boy (올드보이가 되다)	
21	January 2, 2005	Woman's resentment(여인의 한)	
22	January 9, 2005	Taming the Grandson (종손 길들이기)	Han Ji-hye, Kim Jeong-hoon
22	January 9, 2005	In Winter Love Story (속 겨울연가)	Yoo Jae-suk, Jeong Jun-ha, So Yoo-jin
23	January 16, 2005	Get That Girl (그녀를 사수하라)	Andy Lee, Lee Hwi-jae, Jung Ryeo-won, Jang Shin-young
23	January 16, 2005	Our Brother (우리 형)	Yoo Jae-suk, Jeong Jun-ha, Lee Jin
24	January 23, 2005	The Suspicious Man (그 남자가 수상하다)	Andy Lee, Lee Hwi-jae, Lee Jin, Charlie Park
24	January 23, 2005	I Got Married to a Weird Woman (나는 이상한 여자와 결혼했다)	Yoo Jae-suk, Jeong Jun-ha, Jang Na-ra
25	January 30, 2005	To Go Bungee Jump (번지점프를 하러가다)	Andy Lee, Lee Hwi-jae, Jung Ryeo-won, Jang Shin-young
26	February 6, 2005	Best 5 NG Special	
27	February 13, 2005	Trot Rival (트로트 라이벌)	Yoo Jae-suk, Jeong Jun-ha
27	February 13, 2005	Today's Fortune (오늘의 운세)	Andy Lee, Lee Hwi-jae, Lee Jin
28	February 20, 2005	The Rainbow in My Life (내 인생의 지우개)	Yoo Jae-suk
28	February 20, 2005	Cop Story (형사 스토리)	Andy Lee, Lee Hwi-jae, Lee Jin
29	February 27, 2005	The Dangerous Bachelor (위험한 독신남)	Andy Lee, Lee Hwi-jae, Lee Jin
29	February 27, 2005	My Love Mite (내 사랑 찐드기)	Yoo Jae-suk, Jeong Jun-ha, Jang Na-ra
30	March 6, 2005	Reincarnation (환생)	Yoo Jae-suk, Jeong Jun-ha, Jang Na-ra
30	March 6, 2005	Some Day, Suddenly (어느날 갑자기)	Andy Lee, Lee Hwi-jae, Lee Jin
31	March 13, 2005	My Wish (나의 소원)	Andy Lee, Lee Hwi-jae, Lee Jin
31	March 13, 2005	Devil's Whisper (악마의 속삭임)	Yoo Jae-suk, Jeong Jun-ha
32	March 20, 2005	Teacher, Our Teacher (선생님, 우리 선생님)	Yoo Jae-suk, Jeong Jun-ha
32	March 20, 2005	The Pianist (피아니스트)	Andy Lee, Lee Hwi-jae, Lee Jin
33	March 27, 2005	Inside Your Imagination (상상속으로)	Andy Lee, Lee Hwi-jae, Lee Jin
33	March 27, 2005	And There Was Nothing (그리고 아무도 없었다)	Yoo Jae-suk, Jeong Jun-ha, Jang Na-ra
34	April 3, 2005	Sick Heart (심장병)	Andy Lee, Lee Hwi-jae, Lee Jin
34	April 3, 2005	Strange Village (이상한 마을)	Yoo Jae-suk, Jeong Jun-ha, Jang Na-ra
35	April 10, 2005	Lie (거짓말)	Andy Lee, Lee Hwi-jae, Lee Jin
35	April 10, 2005	The Golden Age of Gas Man (가스맨 전성시대)	Yoo Jae-suk, Jeong Jun-ha, Jang Na-ra, Charlie Park
36	April 17, 2005	Father and Son (아버지와 아들)	Andy Lee, Lee Hwi-jae, Lee Jin
36	April 17, 2005	Love Letter (연애편지)	Yoo Jae-suk, Jeong Jun-ha, Yang Mi-ra
37	April 24, 2005	Bad Girl (나쁜 여자)	Andy Lee, Lee Hwi-jae, Lee Jin
38	May 1, 2005	Vanishing Woman (사라진 여자)	Andy Lee, Lee Hwi-jae, Lee Jin, Charlie Park
38	May 1, 2005	Love Game (러브 게임)	Yoo Jae-suk, Jeong Jun-ha, Yang Mi-ra, Jo Sung-mo
39	May 8, 2005	Life Reversal (인생역전)	Andy Lee, Lee Hwi-jae, Lee Jin
39	May 8, 2005	Adieu Special NGs and Best of Yoo Jae-suk and Jeong Jun-ha	
40	May 15, 2005	Her Secret (그녀의 비밀)	Andy Lee, Lee Hwi-jae, Lee Jin
40	May 15, 2005	Taming the Flirt (바람둥이 길들이기)	Park Jung-ah, Choi Jung-won, Haha, Lee Ji-hyun, Ahn Seon-young, U;Nee
41	May 22, 2005	Love Angel (사랑의 천사)	MC Mong, Sung Si-kyung, Jeon Hye-bin
41	May 22, 2005	Making Cinderella (신데렐라 만들기)	Andy Lee, Lee Hwi-jae, Lee Jin
42	May 29, 2005	Bad Housekeeper (불량 가정부)	Seo Kyung-seok, Hwang In-young, MC Mong
42	May 29, 2005	Brothers (형제)	Andy Lee, Lee Hwi-jae, Lee Jin
43	June 5, 2005	My Boyfriend the Prince (내 남자친구는 왕자님)	Jun Jin, Seo Kyung-seok, Hwang In-young
43	June 5, 2005	Non-Stop Thief (못 말리는 도둑)	Andy Lee, Lee Hwi-jae, Lee Jin
44	June 12, 2005	New Gumiho (신 구미호)	Andy Lee, Lee Hwi-jae, Lee Jin, Ahn Seon-young
44	June 12, 2005	Scary Rookie (공포의 신입사원)	Jun Jin, Seo Kyung-seok, Choo So-young
45	June 19, 2005	Devilish Guy (악마같은 그 놈)	Jun Jin, Seo Kyung-seok, Hwang In-young, Sung Si-kyung
45	June 19, 2005	Sad Relationship (슬픈인연)	Andy Lee, Lee Hwi-jae, Lee Jin
46	June 26, 2005	Bell Sounds (방울소리)	Andy Lee, Lee Hwi-jae, Lee Jin
46	June 26, 2005	Two Husbands (두명의 남편)	Jun Jin, Seo Kyung-seok, Choo So-young
47	July 3, 2005	Fatal Love (치명적인 사랑)	Jun Jin, Seo Kyung-seok, Hwang In-young
47	July 3, 2005	Marriage Corporation (결혼 주식회사)	Andy Lee, Lee Hwi-jae, Lee Jin
48	July 10, 2005	Searching for My Man (내 남자를 찾습니다)	Andy Lee, Lee Jin, Sung Si-kyung
48	July 10, 2005	Vampire Beauty (미녀 흡혈귀)	Jun Jin, Seo Kyung-seok, Hwang In-young
49	July 17, 2005	Secret Exposure Service (비밀 폭로 서비스)	Jun Jin, Seo Kyung-seok, Hwang In-young
49	July 17, 2005	My Love Paparazzi (나를 사랑한 파파라치)	Andy Lee, Lee Jin
50	July 24, 2005	First Love (첫사랑)	MC Mong, Seo Kyung-seok, Hwang In-young
50	July 24, 2005	She's Suspicious (그녀가 수상하다)	Andy Lee, Lee Jin
51	August 7, 2005	The Cursed Mask (가면의 저주)	MC Mong, Seo Kyung-seok, Sung Si-kyung, Hwang In-young
51	August 7, 2005	Reverse Drama NG X-File Special	
52	August 14, 2005	The Boss' Woman (보스의 여자)	Andy Lee, Lee Jin, Koo Jun-yup
52	August 14, 2005	10 Minutes Earlier (10분 전)	MC Mong, Seo Kyung-seok, Hwang In-young
53	August 21, 2005	Love Potion (사랑의 묘약)	Sung Si-kyung, Seo Kyung-seok
53	August 21, 2005	Yellow Rose Secret (노란 장미의 비밀)	Andy Lee, Lee Jin, MC Mong
54	August 28, 2005	Search for a Son-In-Law (종갓집 사위되기)	MC Mong, Lee Jin
54	August 28, 2005	Reincarnation (환생연)	Sung Si-kyung, Seo Kyung-seok, Jeon Hye-bin
55	September 4, 2005	The Love of a Girl from the Mountains (산골소녀의 사랑)	Lee Jin
55	September 4, 2005	Message (매세지)	Sung Si-kyung, Seo Kyung-seok, Chae Min-seo
56	September 11, 2005	Contact Lens (콘택트 렌즈)	Sung Si-kyung, Seo Kyung-seok, Chae Min-seo
56	September 11, 2005	When She Opens Her Eyes(그녀가 눈뜰 때)	Lee Jin, Lee Sung-jin
57	September 18, 2005	Sword's Tears (칼의 눈물)	Sung Si-kyung, Seo Kyung-seok, Lee Jin, Park Myung-soo, Haha, Jeon Hye-bin
58	September 25, 2005	The Gorgeous Swindler (화려한 사기꾼)	Sung Si-kyung, Seo Kyung-seok
58	September 25, 2005	My Heart Goes Pit-a-Pat (가슴이 두근두근)	Lee Jin, Lee Sung-jin, Ji Hyun-woo
59	October 2, 2005	First Love Part 1 (첫사랑)	Jung Yun-ho, Park Yoo-chun, Jeon Hye-bin
60	October 9, 2005	Bad Student (나쁜 학생)	Lee Jin, Lee Sung-jin, Ji Hyun-woo
60	October 9, 2005	First Love Part 2 (첫사랑)	Jung Yun-ho, Park Yoo-chun, Jeon Hye-bin, Ji Sang-ryeol, Park Myung-soo
61	October 16, 2005	Protect Mom (엄마를 지켜라)	Sung Si-kyung, Seo Kyung-seok, Jeon Hye-bin
61	October 16, 2005	Aimless Bullet (오발탄)	Lee Jin, Lee Sung-jin, Haha
62	October 23, 2005	The Man in Emergency (위기의 남자)	Lee Jin, Lee Sung-jin, Ivy
62	October 23, 2005	Heat-Butt King (박치기왕)	Seo Kyung-seok, Jeon Hye-bin, Haha
63	October 30, 2005	Magician's Doll (마술사의 인형)	Lee Jin, Choi Jung-won, Lee Sung-jin, Charlie Park
63	October 30, 2005	You Are My Destiny (너는 내 팔자)	Sung Si-kyung, Seo Kyung-seok, Jeon Hye-bin
64	November 6, 2005	Sleeping Beauty (잠자는 공주)	Lee Jin, Lee Sung-jin, Kim Heung-soo
64	November 6, 2005	Grim Reaper's Love (저승사자의 사랑)	Seo Kyung-seok, Jeon Hye-bin
65	November 13, 2005	Trap (덫)	Lee Min-woo, Seo Kyung-seok, Jeon Hye-bin
65	November 13, 2005	Love Virus (러브 바이러스)	Lee Jin, Hwang Jung-eum, Kim Heung-soo
66	November 20, 2005	Champion (챔피언)	Lee Min-woo, Seo Kyung-seok, Jeon Hye-bin
66	November 20, 2005	Camera Phone (카메라폰)	Lee Sung-jin, Kim Heung-soo, Jang Hee-jin
67	November 27, 2005	Defend the Police Station (파출소를 사수하라)	Jeon Hye-bin, Lee Sung-jin, Seo Kyung-seok, Charlie Park
67	November 27, 2005	Masked Warrior (가면무사)	Jung Yun-ho, Park Yoo-chun, Jang Hee-jin
68	December 4, 2005	Dangerous Student (위험한 학생)	Seo Kyung-seok, Jeon Hye-bin, Lee Sung-jin, Ahn Suk-hwan
68	December 4, 2005	Memories of Love (사랑의 기억)	Kim Heung-soo, Hwang Jung-eum, Kang Jung-hwa
69	December 11, 2005	Wife Swap (아내가 바뀌었어요)	Seo Kyung-seok, Kang Jung-hwa
69	December 11, 2005	Jung-min's Younger Brother, Kyung-min (정민이 동생 경민)	Kim Jung-min, Hong Kyung-min, Jang Hee-jin
70	December 18, 2005	Child from the Future (미래에서 온 아이)	Haha, Park Jung-ah, Kang Jung-hwa
70	December 18, 2005	Unseen Love (보이지 않는 사랑)	Seo Kyung-seok, Jang Hee-jin
71	December 25, 2005	god, Love Christmas(god, 사랑의 크리스마스)	
72	January 1, 2006	Defend the Police Station II (파출소를 사수하라)	
73	January 8, 2006	reincarnation (환생)	
74	January 15, 2006	In the Art Of Fighting (속 싸움의 기술)	
75	January 22, 2006	Patient in Room 503 (503호실의 환자)	
75	January 22, 2006	Mischief of fate(운명의 장난)	
76	January 29, 2006		
77	February 5, 2006	The last play (마지막 연극)	
77	February 5, 2006	NG BEST of BEST	
78	February 12, 2006	Total settlement (총 결산)	
79	February 19, 2006	The King's Man (왕의 남자)	Jung Yun-ho, Shim Chang-min, Kim Jae-joong, Park Yoo-chun, Kim Junsu
80	February 26, 2006	Tokyo Holiday (도쿄 홀리데이)	Jung Yun-ho, Shim Chang-min, Kim Jae-joong, Park Yoo-chun, Kim Junsu
81	March 5, 2006	Finding Lost Time (잃어버린 시간을 찾아서)	Jung Yun-ho, Shim Chang-min, Kim Jae-joong, Park Yoo-chun, Kim Junsu
81	March 5, 2006	The Uninvited Guest (초대받지 않은 손님)	Jung Yun-ho, Shim Chang-min, Kim Jae-joong, Park Yoo-chun, Kim Junsu
82	March 12, 2006	Dangerous Love (위험한 사랑)	Jung Yun-ho, Shim Chang-min, Kim Jae-joong, Park Yoo-chun, Kim Junsu
82	March 12, 2006	Unforgettable Love (내 생애 가장 잊지못할 그녀)	Jung Yun-ho, Shim Chang-min, Kim Jae-joong, Park Yoo-chun, Kim Junsu
83	March 26, 2006	Suicide Rescue Squad (자살구조대)	Danny Ahn
84	April 2, 2006	The Third Man (제3의 사나이)	Danny Ahn
84	April 2, 2006	TAXI 1986 (택시 1986)	
85	April 9, 2006	Going To School (학교에 가다)	Jun Jin, Bae Seul-ki
85	April 9, 2006	Changing Phone (체인징폰)	Danny Ahn, Seo Ji-heon
86	April 16, 2006	After the Break-up (이별후애)	Jun Jin, Bae Seul-ki, Seo Ji-young
86	April 16, 2006	She's a Witch (그녀는 마녀)	Danny Ahn, Seo Ji-heon
87	April 23, 2006	A Very Special Situation (아주 특별한 사연)	Danny Ahn, Bae Seul-ki, Seo Ji-young
