= Level II (Eru album) =

Studio album by Eru
- Released: October 9, 2006
- Genre: K-pop
- Language: Korean
- Label: Poibos Co., Ltd.

Eru chronology
Begin to Breathe (2005)	Level II (2006)	Eru Returns (2007)

Level II is an album by Eru, a singer from South Korea. The singles "까만안경" (Black Glasses) and "흰눈" (White Snow) performed really well, making this album more successful than his first. His promotional schedule for the album ended sometime in March 2007.

== Track listing ==
1. 까만안경 (Black Glasses) (feat. Daylight) (3:46)
2. 돌아와 내게 (Come Back To Me) (3:45)
3. 늦지 않기를 (Not To Be Late) (4:18)
4. I'll Promise (4:26)
5. 떠나가 (Leave) (4:07)
6. With You (3:21)
7. 가슴앓이 (3:51)
8. 흰눈 (White Snow) (3:56)
9. 사랑하니까 (Because I Love You) (3:59)
10. 옥경이 (feat. Tae Jin Ah) (3:36)
