= Seo Kyung-seok =

South Korean entertainer (born 1972)

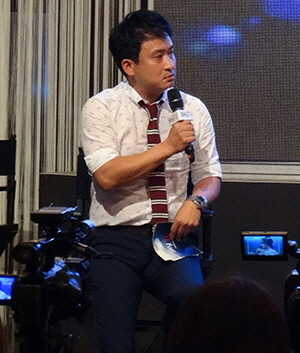
- Seo on July 30, 2014
- Born: February 15, 1972 (age 54); Daejeon, South Korea
- Spouse: Yoo Da-som (m. 2010)

Comedy career
- Years active: 1993–present
- Medium: Stand-up, television
- Genres: Observational, Sketch, Wit, Parody, Slapstick, Dramatic, Sitcom

- Seo Kyung-seok
- Hangul: 서경석
- Hanja: 徐京錫
- RR: Seo Gyeongseok
- MR: Sŏ Kyŏngsŏk

Seo Kyung-seok (Korean: 서경석; born February 15, 1972), is a South Korean comedian and show host. He was a cast member of the variety show Real Men.

== Education ==
- Graduated, Dongdaejeon High School
- Bachelor's Degree Program, Korea Military Academy (Dropped-Out)
- Bachelor of Arts in French Language, Seoul National University (Graduated)
- Master of Arts in Mass Communication, Chung-Ang University

== Filmography ==
=== TV series ===
Year	Title	Role	Notes/Ref.
2005	Banjun Drama	Himself	
2013–2015	Real Men	Himself	
2015	The Producers	Cindy's Lawyer Fan	Cameo
2017	Ultimate Beastmaster	Himself/host	
2017	King of Mask Singer	Contestant	as "Prepayment Later Start Garland Man" (Episode 105)

=== Radio ===
Year	Title	Role	Note
2008–2010	Music Show	Himself	

== Awards and nominations ==
Year	Award	Category	Nominated work	Result
2000	Baeksang Arts Awards	Most Popular – Variety Performer	Yeogineun Comedy Bonbu	Won
2011	SBS Entertainment Awards	Netizen Popularity Award	TV Entertainment Tonight	Nominated
2013	MBC Entertainment Awards	Award in PD		Won
2013	MBC Entertainment Awards	Most Popular Award in MC		Won
