= You Are Too Much =

2017 South Korean television series

- Promotional poster
- Hangul: 당신은 너무합니다
- RR: Dangsineun neomuhamnida
- MR: Tangsinŭn nŏmuhamnida
- Genre: Family; Musical; Melodrama
- Created by: Shin Hyun-chang
- Written by: Ha Chung-Ok
- Directed by: Baek Ho-Min
- Creative directors: Kim Seul-ah; Woo Ji-eun; Kang Hak-goo
- Starring: Uhm Jung-hwa; Koo Hye-sun (ep 1-6); Jang Hee-jin; Kang Tae-oh
- Country of origin: South Korea
- Original language: Korean
- No. of episodes: 86

Production
- Executive producer: Jo Yoon-jung
- Camera setup: Single-camera
- Running time: 75 min
- Production company: Victory Contents

Original release
- Network: MBC TV
- Release: January 2 – August 30, 2017

You Are Too Much (Korean: 당신은 너무합니다; RR: Dangsineun neomuhamnida) is a 2017 South Korean television series starring Uhm Jung-hwa, Jang Hee-jin (replacing Koo Hye-sun), Kang Tae-oh, and Jung Gyu-woon. The series aired from March 4 till August 27, 2017 on Saturdays and Sundays from 8:45 p.m. to 10:00 p.m. (KST) on MBC TV.

== Synopsis ==
The series revolves around a Yoo Ji-na impersonator who calls herself "Yoo Gina". The real Yoo Ji-na is a pop diva who lived life to the fullest and one day, she becomes involved with her impersonator called "Yoo Gina" and their two lives become intertwined. Yoo Ji-na lives a glamorous life but she also harbors a personal tragedy that pains her deeply. Then there is "Yoo Gina" who works as an impersonator at a nightclub to eke out a living but wants to become a real singer herself.

== Cast ==
=== Main ===
- Uhm Jung-hwa as Yoo Ji-na / Kim Hye-jung

She is a pop diva aged 45. Her soulful voice that lifts people's spirits has given her a career that has lasted over 20 years. She possesses a free spirit along with a glamorous look. She becomes envious of her impersonator, "Yoo Gina." Upon seeing the girl's boyfriend wait until the wee hours of the night to drive her home after the nightclub singing gig, she cannot but feel jealous. The sacrifices she made to build her career in the entertainment business have left her lonely in her personal life. Then, Chairman Park Sung-hwan who is a longtime fan of hers, asks her to marry him.

- Koo Hye-sun (episode 1-6) → Jang Hee-jin as Jung Hae-dang / Yoo Gina

Aged 33 she is a Yoo Ji-na impersonator who goes by the stage name Yoo Gina. After her father lost his job and her mother died, she had to earn money to support the family so she found a singing gig at a nightclub where she was a Yoo Ji-na impersonator. Her dreams of becoming an original artist and producing her own songs were becoming more distant by the day. Her boyfriend is the only person who fully supports her and gives her the strength to go on. He is both her manager and driver. He makes her feel special even though she is just an ordinary girl desperately trying to make a living. But he has become attracted to someone else lately and that person is no other than the real Yoo Ji-na.

- Kang Tae-oh as Lee Kyung-soo / Yoon Sang-ah
  - Kim Gun-woo as young Lee Kyung-soo

Yoo Ji-na's son. At the age of six, he lost his vision in an accident and abandoned at an orphanage by his mother. Unable to see, he kept waiting for his mother who never came. Thanks to a benefactor, he was able to take piano lessons and learn the piano. By age 25, he owns a cafe. He uses the alias "Yoon Sang-ah" when giving private piano lessons and playing music at events. While playing the piano, Hae-dang sings along to the tune, and her voice is uncannily similar to his mother's voice.

- Jung Gyu-woon as Park Hyun-joon

Park Sung-hwan's eldest son, aged 37. He runs a talent agency. Although he is the spitting image of his dad, he takes after his mom's warm and loving personality. His mother donated to the cause for disabled people and Hyun-joon also volunteers to help them. His dad married his mom for her money and after her death, he announces that he will marry Yoo Ji-na. Already suspecting that his paternal grandmother and dad seized control of mom's family company and drove her to suicide, he plans to exact revenge on his dad with a terrible plan.

=== Supporting ===
==== Hae Dang's Family ====
- Kang Nam-gil as Jung Kang-shik, Hae-dang's father, operates a gas station after his original business collapsed
- Shin Da-eun as Jung Hae-jin, lectures at university and aspires to be a professor
- Kim Kyoo-sun as Jung Hae-sung, teacher who aspires to be a writer
- Jung Hae-na as Jung Hae-soo, youngest sister who just graduated from college

==== Hyun Joon's Family ====
- Jun Kwang-ryul as Park Sung-hwan

Hyun-joon's father, aged 63. The only son of Sung Kyung-ja, their family came from a humble background but used unscrupulous means so he could become CEO of the family firm GR Group. Recently widowed who wants to marry Yoo Jin-na who is 18 years his junior, despite opposition from his mother and sons.

- Jung Hye-sun as Sung Kyung-ja

Sung-hwan's mother, aged 83

- Lee Hwa-young as Choi Kyung-ae

Sung-hwan's late wife, daughter of the founder of GR Group and philanthropist, benefactor of Lee Kyung-soo

- Son Tae-young as Hong Yoon-hee

Hyun-joon's fiancee though an upcoming arranged marriage, comes from a distinguished family, as her paternal grandfather was a university president, while her maternal side has several relatives in government officials.

- Eru as Park Hyun-sung

Hyun-joon's younger brother, largely obedient to their father, who works as an executive in GR Group. Married Go Na-kyung in an arranged marriage despite loving another woman.

- Yoon A-jung as Go Na-kyung

Hyun-sung's wife, age 35, the homemaker in the Park household. Comes from a humble background but finished college and married into the Park family thanks to Kyung-ja who selected Na-kyung over daughters of wealthy families.

==== Hae-jin's Family ====
- Kim Bo-yeon as Baek Mi-sook

Yun Bong-soo's mother and Hae-jin's mother-in-law

- Kim Hyung-bum as Yun Bong-soo

Hae-jin's husband, Mi-sook's son

- Lee Jae-eun as Yun Bong-sun

Hae-jin's sister-in-law, Mi-sook's daughter, divorced from a previous marriage

- Jung Hyun Joon as Yun Ji-hoon

Hae-jin and Bong-soo's son

- Bae Yoon-kyung as Ji-ha
- Choi Jung-woo as Jeong-woo

=== Others ===
- Choi Jung-won as Im Chul-woo

== Production ==
On March 23, 2017, Koo Hye-sun dropped out due to a serious allergic reaction. In her place, Jang Hee-jin was cast to play Jung Hae-Dang for the rest of the series.

== Viewership ==
- In this table, The blue numbers represent the lowest ratings and the red numbers represent the highest ratings.

Ep.	Broadcast date	Average audience share			
Ep.	Broadcast date	TNmS		AGB Nielsen	
Ep.	Broadcast date	Nationwide	Seoul	Nationwide	Seoul
1	25/2/2017	11.1% (3rd)	10.9% (4th)	12.0% (4th)	12.2% (5th)
2	26/2/2017	12.2% (2nd)	12.1% (3rd)	14.6% (3rd)	15.0% (3rd)
3	27/2/2017	9.3% (4th)	9.9% (6th)	10.0% (6th)	10.8% (6th)
4	28/2/2017	10.9% (4th)	11.2% (4th)	12.9% (5th)	13.1% (6th)
5	29/2/2017	11.2% (6th)	11.3% (6th)	11.4% (5th)	11.9% (5th)
6	1/3/2017	13.3% (3rd)	13.6% (5th)	14.6% (4th)	15.2% (5th)
7	2/3/2017	9.6% (7th)	9.6% (5th)	11.2% (5th)	11.9% (6th)
8	3/3/2017	13.6% (2nd)	14.2% (3rd)	13.3% (6th)	13.3% (6th)
9	4/3/2017	10.4% (5th)	10.7% (6th)	11.3% (6th)	12.2% (4th)
10	5/3/2017	12.8% (4th)	12.6% (5th)	13.1% (5th)	13.7% (5th)
11	6/3/2017	10.5% (5th)	10.8% (5th)	9.9% (6th)	10.3% (6th)
12	7/3/2017	11.8% (7th)	12.1% (6th)	12.4% (7th)	12.6% (7th)
13	8/3/2017	11.4% (4th)	11.6% (4th)	11.4% (4th)	11.5% (3rd)
14	9/3/2017	13.0% (4th)	13.1% (5th)	12.9% (4th)	13.0% (5th)
15	10/3/2017	11.0% (3rd)	10.8% (4th)	11.8% (4th)	12.2% (3rd)
16	11/3/2017	13.3% (2nd)	12.0% (3rd)	14.0% (2nd)	14.5% (2nd)
17	12/3/2017	16.4% (2nd)	16.2% (3rd)	16.3% (3rd)	16.1% (3rd)
18	13/3/2017	14.3% (2nd)	15.0% (2nd)	14.2% (2nd)	14.3% (2nd)
19	14/3/2017	16.5% (3rd)	17.2% (3rd)	16.5% (3rd)	16.0% (3rd)
20	15/3/2017	11.4% (3rd)	11.7% (3rd)	11.4% (5th)	11.2% (6th)
21	16/3/2017	12.4% (3rd)	12.3% (5th)	12.9% (3rd)	13.4% (5th)
22	17/3/2017	11.5% (4th)	10.7% (7th)	12.8% (3rd)	13.3% (3rd)
23	18/3/2017	11.8% (2nd)	10.3% (4th)	10.8% (3rd)	10.9% (5th)
24	19/3/2017	12.1% (4th)	11.2% (8th)	12.7% (4th)	12.8% (4th)
25	20/3/2017	10.3% (4th)	9.6% (4th)	11.5% (3rd)	11.3% (3rd)
26	21/3/2017	12.0% (4th)	11.5% (4th)	13.5% (3rd)	13.9% (3rd)
27	22/3/2017	11.5% (4th)	11.1% (4th)	10.9% (3rd)	10.8% (5th)
28	23/3/2017	12.9% (4th)	12.9% (3rd)	12.5% (3rd)	12.4% (4th)
29	24/3/2017	10.4% (4th)	10.2% (4th)	12.2% (4th)	12.2% (4th)
30	25/3/2017	13.9% (3rd)	13.5% (4th)	14.4% (3rd)	14.3% (3rd)
31	26/3/2017	11.4% (2nd)	11.2% (4th)	12.6% (2nd)	13.0% (3rd)
32	27/3/2017	13.5% (3rd)	12.7% (3rd)	14.2% (3rd)	14.5% (3rd)
33	28/3/2017	11.1% (3rd)	11.2% (3rd)	11.9% (3rd)	12.2% (4th)
34	29/3/2017	13.9% (3rd)	14.0% (3rd)	12.7% (6th)	12.8% (5th)
35	30/3/2017	12.1% (4th)	11.8% (4th)	12.3% (4th)	12.5% (4th)
36	31/3/2017	13.7% (4th)	13.9% (3rd)	13.0% (4th)	13.1% (4th)
37	1/4/2017	12.1% (4th)	11.7% (4th)	12.8% (4th)	13.0% (4th)
38	2/4/2017	14.9% (4th)	14.7% (3rd)	15.6% (3rd)	16.1% (3rd)
39	3/4/2017	12.7% (4th)	12.5% (4th)	13.0% (3rd)	13.2% (3rd)
40	4/4/2017	15.9% (4th)	15.7% (3rd)	16.1% (3rd)	16.7% (3rd)
41	5/4/2017	14.2% (3rd)	13.1% (3rd)	14.4% (3rd)	14.7% (3rd)
42	6/4/2017	14.7% (3rd)	14.6% (3rd)	15.2% (3rd)	15.8% (3rd)
43	7/4/2017	11.9% (3rd)	12.2% (4th)	13.4% (3rd)	13.6% (3rd)
44	8/4/2017	14.7% (3rd)	13.5% (3rd)	16.6% (3rd)	16.5% (3rd)
45	9/4/2017	12.6% (3rd)	12.6% (3rd)	12.5% (3rd)	12.6% (3rd)
46	10/4/2017	15.1% (3rd)	15.4% (3rd)	15.2% (3rd)	14.9% (3rd)
47	11/4/2017	12.2% (3rd)	12.7% (3rd)	13.9% (3rd)	14.0% (3rd)
48	12/4/2017	17.5% (2nd)	17.4% (3rd)	19.4% (2nd)	19.6% (3rd)
49	13/4/2017	13.0% (3rd)	11.4% (5th)	13.2% (3rd)	13.6% (3rd)
50	14/4/2017	14.2% (3rd)	13.1% (3rd)	16.6% (3rd)	17.1% (3rd)
Average		12.7%	12.5%	13.3%	13.5%

=== Notes ===
- Episode 16 did not air on April 23 due to the broadcast of a presidential candidates' debate.
- Episode 22 did not air on May 20 due to the broadcast of the 2017 FIFA U-20 World Cup match between South Korea and Guinea.
- Episode 47 broadcast on 19 August 2017 to start later than usual (9:20PM KST) due to a political program.
- Episode 48 broadcast on 20 August 2017 to start later than usual (9:20PM KST) due to a political program.
