= Hwang In-young =

South Korean actress (born 1978)

- Born: November 23, 1978 (age 47); Seongnam, South Korea
- Education: Yongin University - B.A. and M.A. in Drama
- Occupation: Actress
- Years active: 1997–present
- Agent: StarPig
- Spouse: Ryu Jung-han (m. 2017)

Korean name
- Hangul: 황인영
- Hanja: 黃仁英
- RR: Hwang Inyeong
- MR: Hwang Inyŏng

Hwang In-young (Korean: 황인영; born November 23, 1978) is a South Korean actress. She officially made her acting debut in 1999, and has since starred in films, television series and theater.

Hwang launched the fashion shop 175.5 in 2005, the internet shopping mall White Soda in 2007, and the clothing brand Voet in 2008.

== Personal life ==
She married musical actor Ryu Jung-han in a private ceremony with only family members present March 13, 2017.

== Filmography ==
=== Film ===
Year	Title	Role
1998	Persona (short film)	
1999	Dance Dance	Jin-a
2002	Family	Sung Cho-hee
2006	Good Luck	
2006	Kingsitter	
2010	Bloody Innocent	Jin-hee
2010	The Grass Is Greener	Sun-young
2013	The Hero	Se-young
2015	Clown of a Salesman	Mi-woo

=== Television series ===
Year	Title	Role
1996	Jo Gwang-jo	Mr. Kim's wife
1996	Illusionist	
1998	Song of the Wind	
2000	SWAT Police	Oh Sang-hee
2001	Cool	Kang Ji-young
2001	Outing	Kang Hye-ran
2001	Piano	Woo Min-kyung
2002	Trio	Jeong Mi-ri
2003	Punch	Yoon Bi-seo
2005	Banjun Drama "Bad Housekeeper"	
2005	Banjun Drama "My Boyfriend the Prince"	
2005	Banjun Drama "Devilish Guy"	
2005	Banjun Drama "Fatal Love"	
2005	Banjun Drama "Vampire Beauty"	
2005	Banjun Drama "Secret Exposure Service"	
2005	Banjun Drama "First Love"	
2005	Banjun Drama "The Cursed Mask"	
2005	Banjun Drama "10 Minutes Earlier"	
2005	Pearl Earring	Han Seo-jin
2006	Yeon Gaesomun	Yeon Su-jeong
2007	Reconstruction of Love	
2010	OB & GY	Jung Eun-mi (guest, episode 9)
2010	Typically Women	Na Yoon-joo
2011	Just Like Today	Jung Yoo-mi
2011	Happy and ...	Sun-young (episode 3: "My Wife's Children")
2011	Happy and ...	Si-yeon (episode 7: "Queen of Private Education")
2011	Happy and ...	Soo-jin (episode 10: "Unstoppable Divorce Wars")
2012	Can't Live Without You	Sa Ga-young
2012	My Kids Give Me a Headache	Cafe customer (cameo)
2014	Love & Secret	Lee Soo-ah
2015	The Jingbirok: A Memoir of Imjin War	Queen Uiin
2016	Moorim School: Saga of the Brave	Kang Baek-Ji

=== Variety and radio shows ===
Year	Title	Notes/Ref.
2008	The Millionaire's Shopping Bag	Host, season 1
2012	Hwang In-young's Music Lounge	DJ
2013	Shin Dong-yup and Ranking Women	Panelist
2013	Final Adventure	
2014	Travel Bucket List in Brazil	
2014	Oh My Pet	Host, season 1

== Theater ==
Year	Title	Role
2011	Blithe Spirit	Elvira Condomine
2012–2013	The Ugly One	Fanny
2013	Love Generation	Ha-ru

== Awards and nominations ==
Year	Award	Category	Nominated work	Result
2000	SBS Drama Awards	Best New Actress	SWAT Police	Won
2012	MBC Drama Awards	Excellence Award, Actress in a Serial Drama	Can't Live Without You	Nominated
