= Yeon Gaesomun (TV series) =

2006 South Korean historical television series

- Official title card
- Genre: Historical drama
- Screenplay by: Lee Hwan-Kyung
- Directed by: Lee Jong Han
- Starring: Lee Tae-gon; Hwang In-young; Lee Jung-gil; Son Tae-young
- Country of origin: South Korea
- Original language: Korean
- No. of episodes: 100

Production
- Executive producer: Huh Woong (SBS)
- Producers: Lee Jong-han; Joo Dong-min
- Production company: DSP ENT
- Budget: ₩40 billion

Original release
- Network: SBS
- Release: July 8, 2006 – June 17, 2007

Yeon Gaesomun (Korean: 연개소문; Hanja: 淵蓋蘇文) is a 2006 South Korean historical television series, starring Lee Tae-gon in title role. It also featured Hwang In-young, Lee Jung-gil and Son Tae-young. Directed by Lee Jong Han, the series follows the life of Yeon Gaesomun, a powerful military dictator in the waning days of the Goguryeo kingdom. It premiered on June 1, 2006, on SBS and broadcast for 100-episodes on Saturday and Sunday at 20:45 (KST) till June 17, 2007. The budget of the series was 40 billion South Korean won.

== Synopsis ==
Yeon Gaesomun was a general and powerful military dictator. In the chaotic period of 642, he killed the king of Goguryeo, Yeongnyu and installed Yeongnyu's nephew Bojang as his stooge on the throne. His efforts in calming down Yeon's two sons were not that successful. Then he started repressing Buddhism, the official religion of Goguryeo in favour of Taoism.

== Cast ==
- Yoo Dong-geun as Yeon Gaesomun
  - Lee Tae-gon as young Yeon Gaesomun
  - Eun Won-jae as child Yeon Gaesomun
- Na Han-il as On Sa-mun
- Hwang In-young as Yeon So-jeong
- Kim Kap-soo as Emperor Yang of Sui
- Lee Jung-gil as Eulji Mun-deok
- Won Goo-yun as Joui Seonin
- Son Tae-young as Hong Bol-hwa
- Park Si-yeon as Cheon Gwan-nyeo
- Yoon Seung-won as Kim Yu-sin
  - Lee Jong-soo as young Kim Yu-sin
  - Lee David as child Kim Yu-sin
- Seo In-seok as Emperor Taizong of Tang
  - Lee Joo-hyeon as young Lee Si-min (later Emperor Taizong of Tang)
- Ahn Jae-mo as Yeon Nam Saeng
- Lee So-won as Hong Mae
- Lee Hyo-jung as Young Yang-je (King)
- Lee Jae-eun as Su Yang-je's mistress
- Park In-hwan as Yeon Gaesomun's father
- Choi Jong-hwan as Young Ryu-tae (later Yeongnyu of Goguryeo)
- Choi Kyu-hwan as Saeng Hae
- Yoo Tae-woong as Seol In-gwi
- Jung Wook as Yang Liang
- Park Chul-ho
- Baek Seung-hyeon as King Munmu of Silla
- Choi Jae-sung as Lee Mil
- Choi Jung-woo as Li Jiancheng
- Shin Dong-hun as Yang Manchun
- Maeng Ho-rim as Wee Jing
- Park Young-ji as Bang Hyun Ryung
- Park Yoon-bae as Bae Gu
- Kim Ki-bok as Kim Heum-sun (Yoo Shin's younger brother) (older adult)
  - Lee Kyun as Kim Heum-sun (young adult)
- Lee Kyung-hwa as Queen Sobi (Soo Yang Je's wife)
- Yoon Chul Hyung as Woomun Hwa Geub
- Seo Kap-sook as Princess Mi Shil
- Jung Ui-kap as Sul Tal
- Jung Heung-chae as Gyebaek
- Moon Hoe-won as King Uija of Baekje
- Jo Sang-goo as Juk Ri
- Lee Chang as General Jo Sam-hyang
- Lee Se-eun as Go So-yeon
- Ban Min-jung as So Suk-bi
- Jun Hyun-ah as Empress Wang
- Jang Eun-bi as Wu Zetian
- Im Byung-ki as Lee Sa-ma
- Kim Hong-pyo as Yeon Namgeon
- Hong Soon-chang as Sim Suk-an
- Sun Dong-hyuk as Bang Hyo-tae
- Im Chae-hong as Lee Wongil
- Hwang Geum-hee (Note: Credited as Ji Sung-won.) as Ui Ji-nyeo
- Yang Hyun-min
- Lee Jin-ah
- Lee Il-woong
- Kim Myung-jin
- Song Seung-yong
- Maeng Bong-hak
- Kim Jung-hak
- Lee Seung-ki
- Kim Seung-gi
- Seo Ho-chul
- Kim Jong-kook
- Baek In-chul

=== Cameo ===
- Hong Jin-young as Host
