= Seo Min-woo =

South Korean singer (1985–2018)

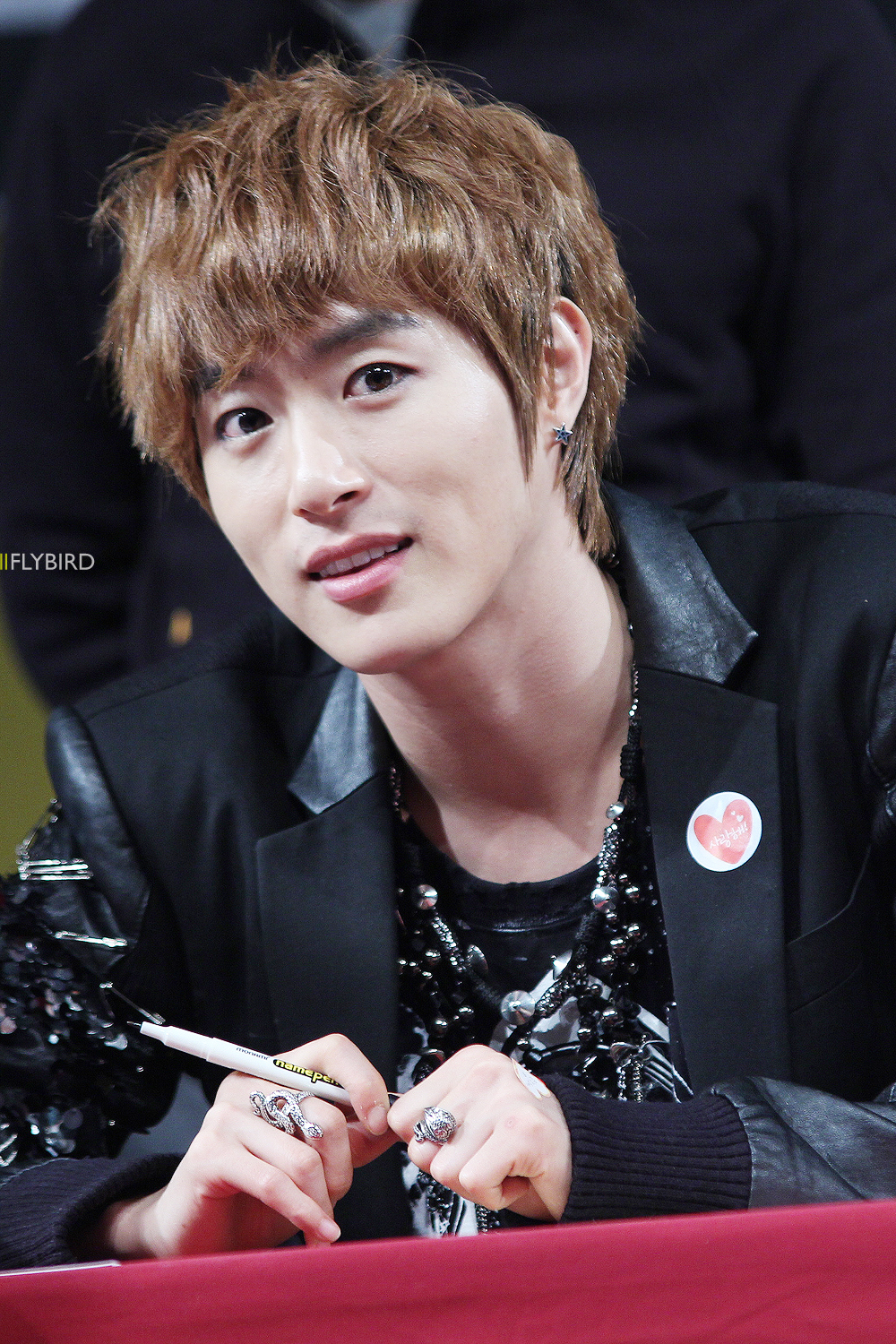
- Seo at 100% Fansign Event in 2012
- Born: February 8, 1985; Suseong District, Daegu, South Korea
- Died: March 25, 2018 (aged 33); Gangnam District, Seoul, South Korea
- Occupations: Actor; singer; dancer; promotional model
- Musical career
- Genres: K-pop; dance-pop
- Years active: 2006–2018
- Label: TOP Media
- Formerly of: 100%

Korean name
- Hangul: 서민우
- RR: Seo Minu
- MR: Sŏ Minu

Seo Min-woo (Korean: 서민우; February 8, 1985 – March 25, 2018), also known mononymously as Minwoo, was a South Korean idol singer and actor. He was a member of the South Korean boy band 100% under the label of TOP Media, as the leader and vocalist.

== Career ==
=== Pre-debut ===
In 2009, Seo was featured during Andy's promotion for his song "Single Man", along with Jumper's second member Park Dong-min (Korean: 박동민). Seo has also been active as an actor. He starred in KBS2's 2006 drama Sharp 3 (Korean: 반올림3) and SBS' 2007 drama The King and I (Korean: 왕과 나), and also did cameos for New Tales of Gisaeng in episode 12 and two movies, Crazy Waiting (Korean: 기다리다 미쳐; 2007) and Where Are You Going? (Korean: 특별시 사람들; 2009).

=== 2013: Love and War 2, 100% ===
In 2013, Seo made a cameo in KBS2's drama, Marriage Clinic: Love and War 2 (Korean: 부부클리닉 사랑과전쟁2).

Seo was chosen as a member of the group 100%, the seven member South Korean boy group that debuted in September 2012 under Andy Lee's company TOP Media with their first single album We, 100%.

=== 2014: military service ===
On March 4, 2014, Seo enlisted in the military for his mandatory military service. He enlisted as an active-duty soldier. Seo was discharged after 21 months, on December 3, 2015.

== Death ==
On March 25, 2018, Seo was found in his home in Gangnam in a state of cardiac arrest. Emergency responders declared him dead on arrival. Seo's funeral was held on March 27, 2018.

== Filmography ==
=== Films ===
Year	Title	Original Title	Role	Ref.
2008	Crazy Waiting	기다리다 미쳐	Song Ho-shin	

=== TV series ===
Year	Title	Original Title	Role	Ref.
2006	Sharp 3	성장드라마 반올림	Kong Yun	
2006	People of the City	특별시 사람들	Lee Nam	
2007	The King and I	왕과 나	Song Man-deuk	
2013	The Clinic for Married Couples: Love and War	부부클리닉 사랑과 전쟁	Cameo	
2016	KBS Drama Special: "Priest"	KBS 드라마 스페셜-평양까지 이만원	Go Min-goo	
