= Into the Flames =

- Promotional poster
- Also known as: Into the Fire
- Genre: Period drama
- Created by: TV Chosun
- Written by: Jung Sung-hee; Lee Han-ho
- Directed by: Kim Sang-rae
- Starring: Choi Soo-jong; Ryu Jin; Son Tae-young; Lee In-hye
- Country of origin: South Korea
- Original language: Korean
- No. of episodes: 20

Production
- Executive producer: Choi Byung-hwa
- Producers: Jung Hoe-seok; Lee Kyung-seon; Jung Hyung-seo
- Production location: Korea
- Running time: Fridays and Saturdays at 23:00 (KST)
- Production company: Kangho Production

Original release
- Network: TV Chosun
- Release: April 25 – June 28, 2014

Into the Flames (Korean: 불꽃 속으로; RR: Bulkkot sogeuro) is a 2014 South Korean television series. It aired on cable channel TV Chosun on Fridays and Saturdays at 23:00 for 20 episodes from April 25 to June 28, 2014.

== Synopsis ==
Based on the life of Park Tae-joon, founder and honorary chairman of multinational steel-making company POSCO, this is the story of the people who battled poverty and despair after the colonial era and the Korean War with a relentless pursuit of economic innovation, and the choices they made in the name of love, loyalty and sacrifice. Park worked tirelessly to build a mill that produced steel, which became pivotal to Korea's modernization.

The early working title was Park's moniker Steel King (강철왕).

== Cast ==
=== Main characters ===
- Choi Soo-jong as Park Tae-hyung
  - Kim Kwon as young Park Tae-hyung
- Ryu Jin as Shin Dae-chul
  - Yoon Hong-bin as young Shin Dae-chul
- Son Tae-young as Kumiko
  - Kim Ye-won as young Kumiko
- Lee In-hye as Jang Ok-sun
- Choi Cheol-ho as Choi Jong-ho
- Dokgo Young-jae as the President
- Jung Ho-bin as Alan Kissinger

=== Supporting characters ===
Yeongil Bay Steel Mill

- Hong Il-kwon as Hwang Joon-suk
- Park Sang-myun as Park Jong-yeol
- Lee Ki-chan as Ahn Seung-joo
- Kim Jin-keun as Kim Byung-hoon
- Lee Won-seok as Yeon Bong-chool
- Gong Jeong-hwan as Jung Sang-ho
- Lee Jong-soo as Kim Sang-chul
- Lee Jeong-yong as Choi Dal-ho
- Choi Kyu-hwan as Chae Ki-joo
- Hong Ah-reum as Ha Cheo-soon

Shinsekai Trading Company

- Lee Chul-min as Takeda
  - Kim Hyun-joon as young Takeda
- Go Myung-hwan as Abe
  - Kim Min-ho as young Abe

Extended cast

- Lee Young-hoo as Yasuoka
- Jeon Soo-kyeong as Yang Hwa-ja
- Cho Young-seo Mrs. Seoul
- Hyun Suk as Tae-hyung's father
- Kim Min-kyung as Tae-hyung's mother
- Park Yong-soo as Kohei
- Jung Myung-hwan as Yamamoto
- Kim Ki-doo
