= Woo Hee-jin =

South Korean actress and model (born 1975)

- Born: May 24, 1975 (age 51); Seoul, South Korea
- Education: Seoul Institute of the Arts – Theater
- Occupations: Actress; model
- Years active: 1987–present
- Agent: HM Entertainment

Korean name
- Hangul: 우희진
- Hanja: 禹喜珍
- RR: U Huijin
- MR: U Hŭijin

Woo Hee-jin (Korean: 우희진; born May 24, 1975) is a South Korean actress. Woo began modeling in commercials when she was in sixth grade, then made her acting debut in 1987. She became a household name when she starred in campus drama Feelings (1994), sitcom Three Guys and Three Girls and Moon Lovers: Scarlet Heart Ryeo

== Filmography ==
Key
†	Denotes films that have not yet been released

=== Film ===
Year	Title	Role	Ref.
1994	Young Lover	Kim Yoon-hee	
2001	Coming Out (short film)	(cameo)	
2012	National Security	In Jae-eun (cameo)	

=== Television series ===
Year	Title	Role	Ref.
1988	500 Years of Joseon: "Queen Inhyeon"	young Crown Princess Consort Shim	
1992	For Love		
1993	Good Morning, Yeong-dong		
1994	Feelings	Kim Yu-ri	
1995	General Hospital	Island girl (guest, episode: "The Scent of Violet Island")	
1995	Good Man, Good Woman	Mi-young	
1995	Declaration		
1995	War and Love	Song Eun-joo	
1996	Salted Mackerel	Kyung-woo	
1996	Three Guys and Three Girls	Woo Hee-jin	
1997	MBC Best Theater': "Followed Recklessly by a Punch of Humor"		
1997	The Third Man	Song Ha-yeon	
1997	White Christmas	Seung-mi	
1998	MBC Best Theater: "Murphy's Law"	In-ae	
1999	Bridge Over Troubled Water	Woo Hee-jin	
1999	Assignable Appearance	Geum-wol	
1999	MBC Best Theater: "When You Look at Me While I Sleep"	Eun-seo	
2000	The More I Love You	Song Na-young	
2000	Money.com		
2000	Three Friends	Woo Hee-jin (cameo, episode 1)	
2001	More Than Words Can Say	Eun Bang-wool	
2002	Miss Mermaid	Eun Ye-young	
2003	Apgujeong House		
2003	MBC Best Theater: "Farewell Waltz"	Min-jung	
2005	Woman Above Flowers	Park Dong-ji	
2005	The Barefooted Youth	Min Hee-jung	
2006	MBC Best Theater: "Woman, Man"	Joo So-ra	
2006	One Fine Day	Married woman in disguise (cameo)	
2006	Look Back with a Smile	Lee Hee-jin	
2007	It's OK Because I Love You	Yoon Ji-in	
2008	HDTV Literature: "My Bloody Valentine"	Hye-young	
2009	Three Men	Woo Hee-jin, Park Sang-myun's wife	
2010	Life Is Beautiful	Yang Ji-hye	
2011	I Trusted Men	Kim Hwa-kyung	
2012	Hometown Over the Hill 2	Choi Young-hee	
2013	Passionate Love	Yang Hye-sook	
2014	KBS Drama Special: "Playing Games"	Lee Eun-hong	
2014	Jang Bo-ri Is Here!	Lee Jung-ran	
2014	Healer	Kang Min-jae	
2015	A Daughter Just Like You	Ma Ji-sung	
2016	Good Person	Yoon Jung-won	
2016	Moon Lovers: Scarlet Heart Ryeo	Court Lady Oh Soo-yeon	
2017	Bad Thief, Good Thief	Park Sun-jin	
2018	I Am the Mother Too	Choi Kyung-shin	
2019	Angel's Last Mission: Love	Chung Yu-mi	
2021	Doom at Your Service	Kang Soo-ja	
2021	Dali & Cocky Prince	Song Sa-bong	
2021	Oh My Ladylord	Kim Yi-na	
2023–2024	My Demon	Do Do-hee's mother	
2024	Love Song for Illusion	Cheong Myung-bi	
2024	Begins ≠ Youth	Hwang Seo-yun	
2026	Sold Out on You		

=== Variety/radio show ===
Year	Title	Role	Ref.
1994	열려라 웃음천국	Host	
1997	Popular Music Best 50	Host	
1997	A Fun Connection Between Two Friends	Host	
1999	Oh! My Mistake	Host	
2001	Wow! e Wonderful World	Host	
2011	EBS FM Special	DJ	
2022	My Mom	Host	

== Awards and nominations ==
Year	Award	Category	Nominated work	Result	Ref.
1996	MBC Drama Awards	Excellence Award, Actress		Won	
2002	MBC Drama Awards	Excellence Award, Actress in a Serial Drama	Miss Mermaid	Won	
2014	KBS Drama Awards	Best Actress in a One-Act/Special/Short Drama	Playing Games	Nominated	
2018	SBS Drama Awards	Top Excellence Award, Actress in a Daily and Weekend Drama	I Am the Mother, Too	Nominated	
