= Lee In-hye =

South Korean actress (born 1981)

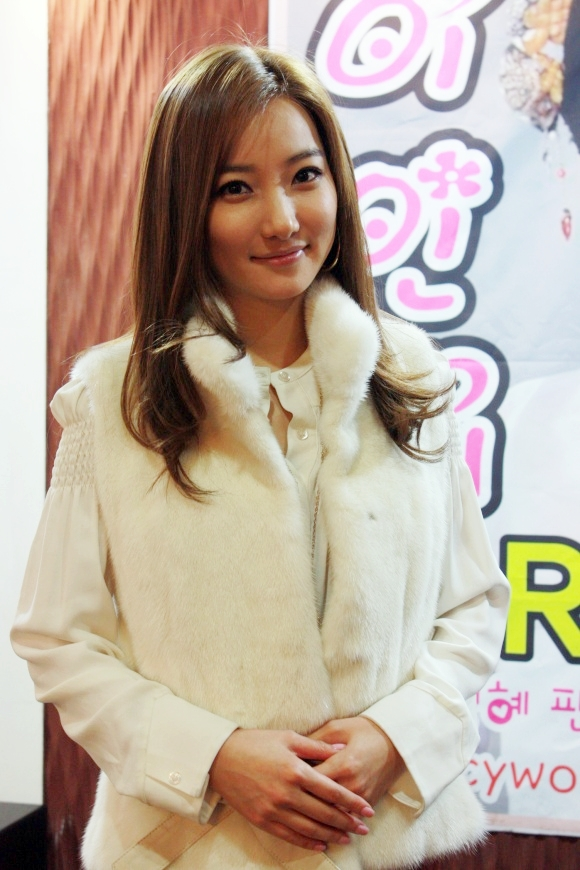
- Lee in 2011
- Born: 21 February 1981 (age 45); Seoul, South Korea
- Education: Korea University
- Occupation: Actress
- Years active: 1991–present
- Agent: Dmost Entertainment
- Spouse: Unknown (m. 2022)
- Children: 1

Korean name
- Hangul: 이인혜
- RR: I Inhye
- MR: I Inhye

Lee In-hye (Korean: 이인혜; born 21 February 1981) is a South Korean actress.

== Career ==
Lee started her career as child actress in 1992 at her age 11 years old, and appeared on a lot of TV dramas like The King's Path (1998, MBC), Spread Your Dreams (1999, EBS), School 3 (2000, KBS), Sassy Girl Chun-hyang (2005, KBS), etc. In 2007, she appeared on KBS drama Insoon Is Pretty as Insoon's rival in love, Han Jae-eun. In 2009, it was revealed that In-hye became an adjunct professor of the Broadcasting and Entertainment department at Korean Broadcasting & Art School. In 2010, her study tip book, 이인혜의 꿈이 무엇이든 공부가 기본이다, topped the bestseller list that she learned as a top student in school. In 2011, Lee appeared in the KBS historical drama Gwanggaeto, The Great Conqueror as Yak-yeon, stepdaughter of Ko Mu and later Queen of Goguryeo. In 2012, she appeared in the KBS drama special Disappearance of a Congressman and E-channel sitcom Firm Family. In 2013, she became a full-time professor of Seoul Arts College, and took on dual roles in the KBS drama special Mother's Island as a mysterious woman and ghost. She appeared on the TV Chosun period drama Into the Flames in 2014 and KBS drama My Fair Lady in 2016. In 2018, Lee took on lead role in the SBS daily drama I Am the Mother Too.

== Personal life ==
=== Marriage and family ===
Lee married a dentist a year younger than her on August 6, 2022. On July 1, 2023, Lee announced her pregnancy. She gave birth to a son on October 5.

=== Religion ===
Lee is a devout Catholic, and her baptismal name is Teresa.

== Filmography ==
=== Television drama and sitcom ===
- JTBC Graceful Friends as Yoo Eun-sil (2020)
- SBS I Am the Mother Too as Yoon Ji-young (2018)
- KBS My Fair Lady as Heo Jae-kyung (2016)
- TV Chosun Into the Flames as Jang Ok-seon (2014)
- KBS Mother's Island as Ms. Kim (2013)
- E Channel Short Family as In-hye (2012–2013)
- KBS Disappearance of a Congressman as Miss Lee (2012)
- KBS Gwanggaeto, The Great Conqueror as Yak-yeon (2011–2012)
- KBS Legend of the Patriots as Jeong-hwa (2010)
- KBS Empress Cheonchu as Empress Seonjeong (2009)
- OCN Love Is Delicious as Han Yeo-kyung (2008)
- KBS Unstoppable Marriage as Park Eun-young (2007–2008)
- KBS In-soon Is Pretty as Han Jae-eun (2007)
- KBS Hwang Jini as Dan-sim (2006)
- KBS Golden Apple as Jung Hong-yeon (2005–2006)
- KBS Dangerous Love as Yoon Su-jeong (2005)
- KBS Sassy Girl Chun-hyang as Han Dan-hee (2005)
- KBS Kkakdugi as Hyun-deok (2004)
- MBC Don't Cry, Mommy! as Yeon-joo (2003)
- SBS Sunflower of Winter as Yoo-jin (2003)
- SBS The Woman as Ma Bok-nam (2002)
- KBS Magic Kid Masuri as Kim Kang-hee (2002–2004)
- MBC Golden Waggon as Lee Min-joo (2002–2003)
- KBS Dongyang Theater as Ok-sim (2001)
- KBS In The Flower Garden as Kwon Hyun (2001)
- SBS Money.com (2000)
- SBS Parades as In-hye (2000)
- KBS School 3 as Yoo Da-in (2000–2001)
- EBS Spread Your Dreams as Jang Yoo-jin (1999)
- EBS Tomorrow as Hee-joo (1999)
- MBC The King's Path as Queen Jeongsun (1998)
- KBS New Generation Report : Adults Don't Know as Lee Yoon-kyung etc. (1997–1998)
- MBC Desires (1997)
- EBS Generation of Sensitivity as Yoo Min-hee (1996–1998)
- KBS Love Blossoms Season (1996)
- MBC Their Hugs (1996)
- MBC Chanpumdanja as young Lee Yong-deok (1995)
- MBC General Hospital as Oh Yoon-soo (1995)
- EBS Always Blue Hearts as Min Se-hee (1995)
- MBC Happiness (1995)
- SBS Lawyer Park Bong-sook (1994–1995)
- KBS Han Myeong-hoe as young Queen Ansun (1994)
- MBC About Meeting the Perfect Guy as young Geum-joo (1994)
- SBS Father (1993)
- MBC Song of Angels (1992)

=== Film ===
- A Tale of Legendary Libido guest starring (2008)
- Mapado 2 guest starring (2007)

=== Play and musical ===
- Trial about Donkey's Shadow as daughter of horseman (Play, 2005)
- Fiddler on the Roof as Bielke (Musical, 1992)

=== Music video appearances ===
- Oh Yoon-hye – "Bruises" (2011)
- Jun Jin – "Love Doesn't Come" (2006)
- Seo Mun-tak – "Chain" (2000)

=== Television show ===
- KBS Busan BUNESCO Committee as MC (2016–2017)
- TBS TV Bookstore Booksori as MC (2016–2017)
- Channel IT IT Square as MC (2012)
- Mnet The Dizzy Blind Dates as MC (2012)
- XTM Rival Match as MC (2011)
- SBS Go, Gold Misses (2010)
- QTV Ranking Ladies (2009–2011)
- KBS TV Kindergarten Hana-Dul-Set as MC (1999–2000)
- SBS Among Ourselves, Our Ages (1994–1995)
- SBS To the World, Sing-Sing-Sing (1994–1995)

=== Others ===
- Professor of Kyungsung University (2015–)
- Professor of Seoul Arts College (2013–2015)
- Writing : Super Stars (2011)
- Writing : Studying Is First of All Whatever Your Dream Is (2010)
- Pictorial : Lee In-hye's Star Photo Album (2009)
- Adjunct professor of Korean Broadcasting & Art School (2009–2012)
- Featuring KBS School 3 OST : "First Love", "Hey, Yeh!" (2000)
- Runner-up in Miss Bingrae Pageant (1994)
- Won Grand Prize in Asia-Pacific Traditional Children's Song Contest (1993)
- Won Excellence Prize in KBS Children's Song Creation Contest (1992)
- Member of MBC Children's Choir (1991–1992)

== Awards and nominations ==
- Won - 2013 Korea Cable TV Awards : Star of the Year (Short Family)
- Nominated - 2010 KBS Drama Awards : Best Supporting Actress (Legend of the Patriots)
- Nominated - 2000 KBS Drama Awards : Best New Actress (School 3)
