= Son Tae-young =

South Korean actress (born 1980)

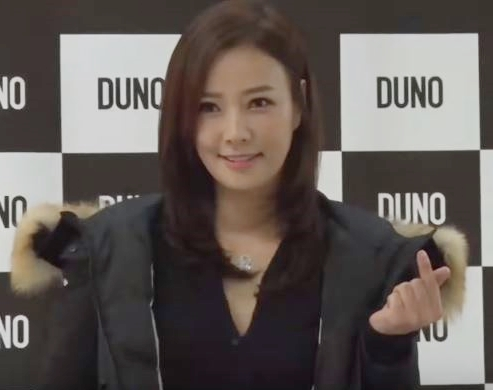
- Son in 2018
- Born: August 19, 1980 (age 46); Daegu, South Korea
- Other name: Sohn Tae-young
- Education: Sangmyung University - Major in Dance
- Occupations: Model; actress
- Years active: 2000–present
- Agent: H8 Company
- Spouse: Kwon Sang-woo (m. 2008)
- Children: 2

Korean name
- Hangul: 손태영
- Hanja: 孫泰英
- RR: Son Taeyeong
- MR: Son T'aeyŏng

Son Tae-young (Korean: 손태영; born August 19, 1980) is a South Korean actress, model and beauty pageant titleholder who won the title of Miss International Korea 2000 and was crowned 1st runner up at Miss International 2000 pageant. She is known for her work on television, with starring in lead and supporting roles in dramas such as One Million Roses (2003), Two Wives (2009), and Into the Flames (2014).

== Career ==
As Miss Daegu, Son placed second runner-up (or third place) at the Miss Korea pageant in 2000. She was the country's representative at the 2000 Miss International pageant, where she won 1st runner-up and Miss Photogenic. Son was also named Miss Grand Slam 2000 2nd place.

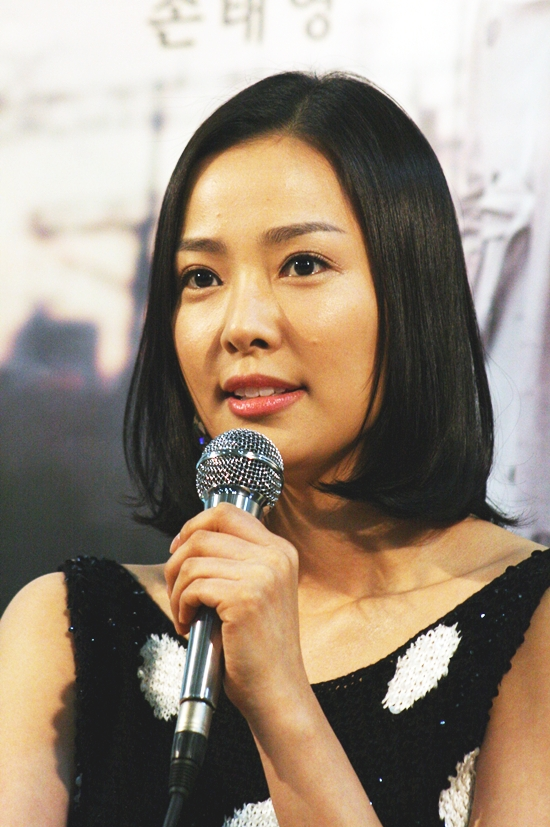
Son at The Railroad press conference in 2007

Son later turned to acting, appearing in the films Sad Movie (2005), the critically acclaimed The Railroad (2007), and Crazy Waiting (2008). Son is more prolific in television, with starring and supporting roles in dramas such as One Million Roses (2003), Two Wives (2009), You Are the Best! (2013), and Into the Flames (2014).

In 2014, Son played the leading role of a wife with a cheating husband in the Chinese romantic comedy film Love War, opposite Hu Bing and Winston Chao.

Known for her sense of style, she has also hosted several beauty and fashion programs, among them Son Tae-young's Life Magazine (2008), Actress House - Season 2 (2011), and Son Tae-young's W Show! (2013).

== Personal life ==
=== Marriage and family ===
Son married actor Kwon Sang-woo at the Shilla Hotel in Seoul on September 28, 2008. On February 6, 2009, she gave birth to a son, christened as Luke (nicknamed Rookie). Their second child, a daughter, was born on January 10, 2015. Son's brother-in-law is pianist and composer Yiruma.

== Filmography ==
=== Television series ===
Year	Title	Role
2001	Pure Heart	Cha Da-hye
2002	Remember	Shin Ji-eun
2003	One Million Roses	Park Hye-ran
2004	Banjun Drama: "Romance Solver"	
2004	Banjun Drama: "Cute Hostage"	
2005	Marrying a Millionaire	Jung Soo-min
2006	Yeon Gaesomun	Hong Bol-hwa
2006	Freeze	Ehwa
2007	I Am Sam	Shin So-yi
2008	Drama City: "Love Hunt, Thirty Minus Three"	Yi-kyung
2008	Iljimae	Lee Yeon
2009	Two Wives	Han Ji-sook
2013	King of Ambition	room salon customer (cameo, episode 2)
2013	You Are the Best!	Lee Hye-shin
2014	Into the Flames	Kumiko
2016	The K2	Uhm Hye-rin
2017	You Are Too Much	Hong Yoon-hee

=== Film ===
Year	Title	Role	Notes
2003	My Daddy	cameo	short film
2004	Ghost House	Soo-kyung	
2005	Sad Movie	Choi Suk-hyun	
2006	3 Colors Love Story	Yoo-mi	segment: "I Can Hear the Memory"
2007	The Railroad	Lee Han-na	
2008	Crazy Waiting	Kim Hyo-jung	
2014	Love War		

=== Variety shows ===
Year	Title	Notes
2000	야!한밤에	MC
2001	Movies and Popcorn	MC
2001	Section TV	MC
2001	Inkigayo (Popular Music)	MC
2008	Son Tae-young's Life Magazine	MC
2011–2012	Actress House - Season 2	MC
2011	Entertainment Inside	MC
2011	K-PopCon	MC
2013	Son Tae-young's W Show!	MC

=== Music video appearances ===
Year	Song title	Artist
2002	"On The Summit"	Kim Jung-min (entertainer)
2002	"La La La"	Lee Soo-young
2005	"추억은 시간이 지운다"	Youme
2008	"Always with Me"	Revi

== Awards ==
Year	Award	Category	Nominated work	Result
2000	44th Miss Korea Pageant	2nd Runner-up (Miss International Korea)	—N/a	Won
2000	40th Miss International Pageant	1st Runner-up	—N/a	Won
2000	40th Miss International Pageant	Miss Photogenic	—N/a	Won
2003	KBS Drama Awards	Popularity Award	One Million Roses	Won
