= Park Tae-joon =

South Korean businessman (1927–2011)

M.P. Park Tae-joon
- 박태준

32nd Prime Minister of South Korea
- In office 13 January 2000 – 18 May 2000
- President: Kim Dae-jung
- Preceded by: Kim Jong-pil
- Succeeded by: Lee Hun-jai (acting); Lee Han-dong

Personal details
- Born: 24 October 1927 Fuzan, Keishōnan Province, Korea, Empire of Japan
- Died: 13 December 2011 (aged 84)
- Education: Waseda University (dropped out); Korea Military Academy 6th Dankook University
- Occupation: Founder & Chairman of POSCO, Republic of Korea Army General, Prime Minister

Korean name
- Hangul: 박태준
- Hanja: 朴泰俊
- RR: Bak Taejun
- MR: Pak T'aejun

Art name
- Hangul: 청암
- Hanja: 靑岩
- RR: Cheongam
- MR: Ch'ŏngam

Park Tae-joon (Korean: 박태준; 24 October 1927 – 13 December 2011) was a South Korean business tycoon and politician who briefly served as the Prime minister of South Korea in 2000.

His most renowned accomplishment includes founding of POSCO and growing it into one of the world's largest and most successful steel companies during his multi-decade tenure as chairman and CEO. For this, he was often called the "Korean Andrew Carnegie". Earlier in his life, he served in the South Korean Army and led several platoons during the Korean War and eventually reaching the rank of Major General. He also founded POSTECH (leading research university in Korea), the Pohang Steelers soccer team, and the POSCO TJ Park Foundation which was preceded by the Steel Scholarship Foundation. His pen name was Chungam.

== Early years ==
He was born on October 24, 1927 in the South Gyeongsang Province of Korea. When he was six years old, he moved to Japan where his father was working, but returned to his homeland following Korea's independence.

Park went to Lyamabuk Middle School. He was mobilized into steel manufacturing service during the Second World War; it was his first encounter with steel. At that time, the director of the workplace noticed that he had a talent for the sintering process.

== Education ==
In 1945, after Korea's independence, Park Tae-joon, who had studied mechanical engineering at Waseda University in Japan for two years, dropped out and returned to Korea. He then enrolled in the 6th class of the South Korean Military Academy (Korea Military Academy). During his cadet years, he formed a teacher-student relationship with Captain Park Chung Hee, who was then the commander of the 1st company and an instructor in ballistics. After being commissioned as a lieutenant, he experienced the Korean War firsthand. Following the military coup on May 16, 1961, Park Tae-joon was selected by Park Chung Hee, the chairman of the Supreme Council for National Reconstruction, to serve as his chief secretary and later began working as the highest-ranking official in charge of industry and commerce.

He and other Korean military officers completed a bachelor's degree in a four-year standard university as required by the government. They had served in the army without completing a standard degree course after the liberation and it was the government's measure to build the Korea Military Academy (then called the South Korea Guard Academy) for officers to have a standard degree course (after 11th graduation). The government had noticed that they needed a commissioned education for officers to have bachelor's degree course in government level. The degree awarded from Dankook University is the only one which is acknowledged by Korea.

== Military service ==
In 1948, Park graduated from the Korea Military Academy and was then commissioned as shavetail. He was awarded the Chungmu Order of Military Merit and the Hwarang Order of Military Merit after participating in the Korean War. He did not take part in May 16 coup, but entrusted his family in case of failing Park Chung Hee.

After the coup, he became a member of commerce and industry in the Supreme Council for National Reconstruction and had a part in the first five-year Korea economic development plan. In 1963, Park was discharged as a major general.

== Commercial life ==
After he transferred to the first reserve, he became the president of TaeguTec in 1964. One year later, the company turned around from deficit. To this day, TaeguTec is one of the only Korean companies that Warren Buffett has invested in. He became the president of Posco in April 1968. 10 years later, POSCO was a global company, and by 2010 was the world's third largest steelmaker.

== Political activities ==
In 1980, Park entered the political world because of the possibility of being appointed as the first member of the Nation Preservation Legislation Council. He was elected to be the 11th member of the National Assembly under the Democratic Justice Party and he served as a director of the finance committee in the National Assembly. After three similar parties were merged, he became chairman of the Democratic Liberal Party.

Park resigned as president of POSCO in October 1992. In the beginning of POSCO's establishment, Park used it to protect himself from political draft. He laid down the president position right after the establishment of a new government of discord with Kim Young-Sam and his government. He submitted a letter of resignation in October of 5th, 1992. Park's honorary president rejected the position of election task force from Kim Young-Sam's Democratic Liberal Party. On the same day, POSCO had an emergency board meeting to reverse his decision of resignation from POSCO.

Discord with Kim Young-Sam caused Park to resign from his position in the National Assembly. Park wandered from place to place abroad because he was suspected of taking about 3.9 billion from POSCO sub-vendors. There was a widespread doubt that there was to be any targeted investigation of him. In 1997, he successfully came back and was elected as a member of the National Assembly in Buk-gu Pohang by blaming President Kim for the economic failure.

He became the chairman of the Liberal Democratic Party, then supported Kim Dae Joong for the 15th presidency with Kim Jong Pil. He took office as the chairman in the government of Kim Dae Joong in 2000, but he resigned his spot because the government accused him of property fraud. The accusations were later found to be false by a Korean court. In his later years he participated in awarding the Chungam Prize every year.

== Awards and achievements ==
=== Awards ===
Park Tae-joon was awarded the Chungmu Order of Military Merit (1950, 1952), the Hwarang Order of Military Merit (1951, 1953, 1954), the Order of Civil Merit, the Rose of Sharon Medal (1974), the French National Order of Legion of Honor (Légion d'honneur) (1990), and the Norwegian Order of Military Merit (1991). After his death, he was conferred posthumous honors of the Ching [Manchu] dynasty presented merit.

He was granted an honorary engineering doctorate degree from Carnegie Mellon University, The University of Sheffield, Birmingham University, and The University of Waterloo. He was also granted an honorary doctorate in economics from Moscow State University in Russia.

According to authorities of POSCO, "The National Commission give an award to Park Tae-joon for contributing to national development."

The National commission also remade 6 out of his 7 medals (2 Chungmugong medals, 3 Hwarangmugong medals, Mugunghwa medal, Gumtap-industry medal) as a memorial to him. The National Commission placed 6 remade medals except for Gumtap-industry medal at the mortuary during his funeral.

He was awarded the Bessemer Gold Medal by the Institute of Metals in 1987.

In 2011, Park was inducted into the inaugural class of the American Metal Market Steel Hall of Fame for his role in turning South Korea into an industrialized nation.

=== Achievements ===
==== Management of POSCO ====
According to Japan's Mitsubishi Research Institute, POSCO was able to succeed as a leader in promoting venture leadership and insight. Chairman Park Taejoon has demonstrated sufficient commitment to the creation of Harvard Business School and Seoul National University. The major factor in the success of POSCO is "outstanding leadership of President Park Taejoon". In addition, in a Stanford Business School study released a report that called the "outstanding leadership of President TJ Park" critical to the development of South Korea. He created apartment complexes for the employees of POSCO, while paying more attention to the composition of the highest level of housing complexes, including preschool for children was established.

==== Contributions to education and science ====
He established Pohang University of Science and Technology in 1986. In 1971, he established the Steel Scholarship Foundation with a fund of 60 million KRW. In 1996, the name changed to Pohang Iron & Steel Scholarship Foundation, then POSCO Scholarship Foundation in 2002, and finally POSCO TJ Park Foundation in 2005. The project helped support education expenses of POSCO employees, helped students get doctoral degrees overseas, fund schools ranging from elementary to high schools, and then established the POSCO TJ Park Prize in 2007.

== Personal life ==
=== Relationship with Park Chung Hee ===
The relationship with Park Chung Hee (3rd President of South Korea) started from 1947 when they were in the military. Park Chung Hee, who was a company commander and also an instructor of ballistics, carefully observed Park Taejoon's behavior because he was good at mathematics and followed his own strict rules. He had become distant from Park Chung Hee since his graduation. Their relationship started again 10 years later when he had worked in the Headquarters of the Army as a colonel. At the same time, Junghui Park had been assigned as a commander of logistics support base asked Park Taejoon to assist him as the chief of staff. In spring of 1961, Park Chung Hee had prepared a military coup, which is well known as the 5.16 military coup, with some officers. Many commanders, including Jongpil Kim participated in the 5.16 military coup. Two months after the success of 5.16 military coup, Park Chung Hee assigned Park Taejoon as a chief secretary of chairman on nation reconstruction council. In September, Park Chung Hee assigned him as a chief member of commerce and industry division on nation reconstruction council. Park Taejoon had always accompanied Park Chung Hee on every business trip. In 1963, Park Taejoon and Park Junghui became civilians. Since Junghui Park had taken part in politics, many commanders who had followed him had also taken part in politics, except Park Taejoon, who turned to be a businessman. At the end of this year, Park Taejoon was assigned CEO of the Korean Tungsten. He had changed the company from deficit to surplus. In 1967, Park Taejoon got special command to establish Pohang Iron & Steel Co. from president Park Junghui and was assigned as CEO of Pohang Iron & Steel Co. in 1978. After the death of president Park Chung Hee, Park Taejoon volunteered to be the guardian of the son of president Park, Park Jiman. Park Taejoon supported him when he tried to take over Samyang Industries.

=== Relationship with Seung-duk Koh ===
In 1984, Go Seung-deok married Park Yu-a, who is a second daughter of Park Tae-joon, chairman of the once ruling United Liberal Democrats, and previous CEO of POSCO. Park Yu-a majored in Fine Art at Ewha Womans University. After graduation, she studied art history and drawing in the United States with Koh Seung-duk (고승덕). They had their first child, Candy Koh, in 1987. When Tae-jun Part died in 2011, Go Seung-deok visited the Yonsei University Severance Hospital to condole the late Park Tae-joon. At that time, he said about the deceased, "He really was a great person, concerned about only big things of the nation" and he also said "Seriously, he is a tycoon of the times in Korea"

=== Friendship and camaraderie ===
Park Taejoon liked people and usually got along with ex-president Chun Doohwan, ex-president Roh Moo-hyun, and prime minister Kim Jong-pil. In finance, he was close with Samsung's Lee Byungchul, Hyundai's Chung Ju-yung, Samsung Electronics Chairman Lee Kun Hee, the honorary chairman of SK Telecom Son Gil-seung, former Daewoo Group Chairman Kim Woojung, and also writer Jo Jung-rae.

In 2011, he was treated for breathing difficulties, and hospitalized on December 13, 2011, in Yonsei Hospital. He died at the age of 84 after taking a serious turn. Although he got lung treatment at Cornell Hospital in 2001, he continued to suffer from after effects. Also, he left a will, in which he stated his hope for POSCO to grow as a power of national industry.

He was buried in Seoul National Cemetery. He outlived his parents Park Bong-gwan and Kim So-sun, and was survived by his spouse Jang Ok-ja, their children, and grandchildren.

== In popular culture ==
- Portrayed by Choi Soo-jong and Kim Kwon in the 2014 TV Chosun's television series Into the Flames.

Preceded by Kim Jong-pil (2nd term)	Prime Minister of South Korea; 2000	Succeeded by Lee Hun Jai (acting)
