= Eru (singer) =

South Korean musician and actor (born 1983)

- Born: Jo Seong-hyeon; July 5, 1983 (age 43); New York City, United States
- Origin: South Korea
- Genres: K-pop; pop ballad
- Occupations: Singer; actor
- Years active: 2005–present
- Labels: Eru Entertainment; The Awesome Entertainment

Korean name
- Hangul: 조성현
- RR: Jo Seonghyeon
- MR: Cho Sŏnghyŏn

Jo Seong-hyeon (Korean: 조성현; born July 5, 1983), known professionally as Eru (이루), is an American-born South Korean singer and actor based in South Korea. His stage name Eru has the meaning that he would accomplish his dreams as a musician. Its also a name that is made from Lee (李) which is the surname of his mother and lu (鏤), which means to inscribe his name on something.

He is known as "Indonesia's Prince," given his popularity in that country.

== Early life and education ==
Eru was born Jo Seong-hyeon on July 5, 1983, in New York City to South Korean parents. He is the second and youngest son of one of the most popular veteran South Korean trot singers, Tae Jin-ah.

Eru lived in New York until he was 7 years old, then his family moved to South Korea, where he attended numerous international schools including Seoul American High School. In 2003, Eru attended the prestigious Berklee College of Music (Piano Department) in Boston. Eru entered the K-Pop scene himself during a break from Berklee.

In late December 2007, Eru released a statement revealing his intentions of fulfilling his military service duties in the latter half of 2008, since he became a Korean citizen 2 years ago.

On May 1, 2008, Eru entered the boot camp to start his mandatory military service at Nonsan Military Training Center. Eru stayed there for four weeks to receive basic training and was subsequently assigned to public service duty. He completed his duty within two years, and returned home on May 27, 2010.

In addition to his singing activities, he was attending Dankook University.

== Career ==
=== Pre-debut ===
Eru wanted to be a producer so he composed many songs. But after a while, he decided that he did not want other people to sing his songs. He wanted to sing them himself. He thought that the person who composes the songs understands them better. That's when he decided to become a singer.

Eru went through two years of training before making his debut as a singer in 2005. Eru's debut album included works from musicians such as Joo Young-hoon, Lee Hyun-jung (the composer of Big Mama's "Break Away"), and vocal trainer No Young Joo, who trained BoA, Fly to the Sky and Lee Soo-young. A 100-member string orchestra also participated in his debut album.

=== Debut ===
Eru debuted with released his first single from his 1st album was "다시 태어나도" (""If I Was Reborn"") on September 5, 2005. Eru released his 2nd album Level II on September 16, 2006. The first single from his 2nd album, "까만안경" ("Black Glasses") which features singer Daylight, gained significant popularity among young people and topped on- and offline charts. The song would later be showered with numerous awards, including Jukeon's song of the month (October 2006) and SBS's Bonsang Award. After the huge success of "까만안경", Eru released his second single "흰눈" ("White Snow"), which he wrote himself. "흰눈" was also successful, reaching #1 on various online charts and winning several awards, including Cyworld's Song of the Month (January 2007). The music video for "흰눈" was shot in Sapporo, Japan and featured Eru and entertainer Lee Hyun-ji. Aside from his own music videos, Eru appeared in female singer Magolpi's debut music video "Flight Girl", where his role was as a composer, along with six other Korean artists, including Yoochun of TVXQ, Kangin, Heechul and Shindong of Super Junior, Park Joon-hyung of g.o.d, and Kim Jang-hoon.

Eru released his 3rd album Eru Returns on September 19, 2007, and it became the #1 album during October 2007, selling 42,228 copies in South Korea. The lead single from this album, "둘이라서" ("Because We Are Two"), enjoyed enormous popularity, winning SBS's Bonsang Award. The music video for this song featured celebrities Ahn Sung-ki, Bong Tae-gyu and Park Joong-hoon. Eru also released "겨울나기" ("Wintering") and "마네킹" ("Mannequin")" as singles from Eru Returns. The star-studded music video cast for "겨울나기" included Eru, actresses Lee So-yeon and Kim Ja-ok, actor Park Sang-myun, trot singers Tae Jin-ah and Song Dae-kwan, comedians Lee Kyung-kyu and Ji Sang-ryeol, singer Kim Heung-gook, and others. His first solo concert took place on February 16, 2008, in South Korea.

Eru released a music video titled "White Tears," his single for his fourth album. His fourth album was released on August 23, 2010. In 2013, he collaborated with Indonesian comedian Sule in a multi-lingual music video titled "Saranghaeyo".

In 2017, Eru had a supporting role in the drama series You Are Too Much, where his character Park Hyun-Sung had increased screen time in later episodes, and he also sung the end credits song "Sad Love".

=== Scandal ===
In September 2010, Eru was accused by ex-girlfriend Choi Hee-jin, a song lyricist, that Eru's father, Tae Jin-ah, forced her to get an abortion after she became pregnant, and tried to give her US$2,000 that she claimed she didn't accept. She aired her claims on her Cyworld account. Choi was later arrested for online slander and blackmail of Tae Jin-ah and Eru.

== Discography ==
=== Studio albums ===
Title	Album details	Peak chart positions	Sales
Title	Album details	KOR	Sales
Begin to Breathe	Released: September 5, 2005; Label: Jinah Production; Format: CD, cassette; Track list: 1. If I Was Reborn (다시 태어나도); 2. Sorry (미안해); 3. Finding Lost Memories (숨은추억찾기); 4. What Do I Do? (어떡해); 5. Speak (말해요); 6. The Similar Person (내가 닮은 사람); 7. If I Could Go Back (돌아갈 수 만 있다면); 8. Life; 9. You Don't Know (모르잖아요); 10. Until Forever After (영원 그 다음까지); 11. Always (내내)	21	KOR: 19,537+
Level II	Released: September 28, 2006; Label: Eru Entertainment; Format: CD, cassette; Track list: 1. Black Glasses (까만안경); 2. Come Back to Me (돌아와 내게); 3. Not to be Late (늦지 않기를..); 4. I'll Promise; 5. Leave (떠나가); 6. With You; 7. Heartbreak (가슴앓이); 8. White Snow (흰눈); 9. Because I Love You (사랑하니까); 10. Okkyungi (옥경이)	10	KOR: 33,936+
Eru Returns	Released: September 20, 2007; Label: Jinah Production; Format: CD, cassette; Track list: 1. Because We Are Two (둘이라서); 2. Did you love me (사랑했나요); 3. Wintering (겨울나기); 4. Love is sad talk (사랑이라는 슬픈얘기); 5. Mannequin (마네킹); 6. I Love You (사랑해); 7. Disguise (가면); 8. I'm Happy (행복합니다); 9. She's Crying 그녀가 울어요; 10. One Word (한마디); 11. Greetings (인사말)	1	KOR: 50,665+
Got To Be	Released: August 19, 2010; Label: Eru Entertainment; Format: CD, digital download; Track list: 1. Time (feat. Shorry J of Mighty Mouth); 2. 'White Tears (하얀 눈물); 3. Confession (고백); 4. After Being Late (늦은 후회); 5. Love Melody (사랑 멜로디) (KBS 2TV 솔약국집 아들들 OST); 6. Even If I Say I Love You Again (다시 사랑한다 말해도); 7. If Only..; 8. Think About It (feat. Joohee of 8Eight) (생각해봐요); 9. I Hate You (내가 밉다); 10. Love Me Even If We Separate (이별마저 사랑해줄게); 11. I Believe In Love (사랑을 믿어요); 12. White Tears (하얀 눈물) (Inst.)	6	—N/a

=== Extended plays ===
Title	Album details	Peak chart positions	Sales
Title	Album details	KOR	Sales
Feel Brand New	Released: April 24, 2011; Label: Eru Entertainment; Format: CD, digital download; Track list: 1. Countrified And Immature (촌스럽고 유치하게); 2. Beautiful (feat. Sangchu of Mighty Mouth) (예뻐요); 3. Try To Forget (잊으려고); 4. Strong Woman (독한 여자); 5. Countrified And Immature (촌스럽고 유치하게) (Inst.)	1	KOR: 17,488+
Feel Brand New Part 2	Released: August 8, 2012; Label: Eru Entertainment; Format: CD, digital download; Track list: 1. I Hate You (feat. Junhyung) (미워요); 2. Drive (feat. Shorry J of Mighty Mouth) (드라이브); 3. Don't Say It (하지마요); 4. Highlight (feat. Ailee) (하이라이트); 5. So Bad	16	KOR: 2,221+

=== Singles ===
- 2006: KBS Drama The Vineyard Man OST
- 2007: KBS Drama Capital Scandal OST
- 2008: SBS Drama First Wives' Club OST
- 2009: KBS Drama My Too Perfect Sons OST
- 2010: KBS Drama Bread, Love and Dreams OST
- 2011: KBS Drama I Believe in Love OST
- 2011: SBS Drama My Love By My Side OST
- 2011: SBS Drama Living in Style OST
- 2012: MBC Drama Rascal Sons OST
- 2013: KBS Drama Secret OST
- 2014: SBS Drama Temptation OST
- 2016: MBC Drama Blow Breeze OST
- 2017: MBC Drama You Are Too Much OST
- 2020: TV Chosun Drama Kingmaker: The Change of Destiny OST
- 2021: MBC Drama A Good Supper OST

== Filmography ==
=== Television series ===
Year	Title	Role	Notes/Ref.
2017	You Are Too Much	Park Hyun-sung	
2019	Angel's Last Mission: Love	Ko Sung-min	
2020	Kingmaker: The Change of Destiny	Lee Ha-jeon	
2020	Man in a Veil	Choi Joon-seok	
2021	A Good Supper	Choi Sung-chan	
2021	At a Distance, Spring Is Green	Park Shi-jae	
2021	Young Lady and Gentleman	Ko Jung-woo	
2022	Sponsor	Michael	Cameo
TBA	Four Men	Moon Ho-seong	TBA

== Awards ==
Year	Award
2005	Mnet 20th Golden Disk Awards - Popularity Award (December 7); Mnet 20th Golden Disk Awards - Yepp New Artist Award (December 7); 2nd Asia Song Festival - Best Asian Artist
2006	Jukeon Digital Music Awards - Digital Music Award "Black Glasses" (December 22); MTV 16th Seoul Music Awards - Digital Music Award (December 1); MTV 16th Seoul Music Awards - Bonsang Award (December 1); Mnet 21st Golden Disk Awards - Digital Popularity Award (December 14); SBS Gayo Daejeon - Bonsang Award (December 29)
2008	17th Seoul Music Awards: Bonsang Award (January 31)
