= Begin to Breathe =

Begin To Breathe

Studio album by Eru
- Released: September 5, 2005
- Genre: K-pop
- Language: Korean

Eru chronology
Begin To Breathe (2005)	Level II (2006)

Begin to Breathe is Eru's debut album, released in the fall of 2005 in South Korea. His first single off the album was a ballad titled "다시 태어나도" ("If I Was Reborn"). It also included the follow-up single "미안해" ("Sorry").

== Production ==
The songs are accompanied with the string melodies that 100 people participated in. The song 'Sorry' contains melodies of acoustic guitar strings, song "Finding Lost Memories" is about the loss of love, and song "If I Could Go Back" was self-written and composed by Eru. Song "If I Was Reborn" tells a story of a man who recently experienced a breakup missing his ex, and was composed by jeon seung woo of boygroup XO.

== Music video ==
The music video for "If I Was Reborn" was directed by Jang jae-hyuk. Lee hyori and Kim Hyun-joong was expected to appear on the music video but it was cancelled due to the change of scripts. This led to the two individuals mentioned in the thanks to section of the physical album.

== Reception ==
As of 2005, October 5th, the album went no 1 in album sales on the hot tracks weekly best chart, passing the sales of Wheesung.

== Track listing ==
1. 다시 태어나도 ("If I Was Reborn")
2. 미안해 ("Sorry")
3. 숨은 추억 찾기 ("Finding Lost Memories")
4. 어떡해 ("What Do I Do?")
5. 말해요 ("Speak")
6. 내가 닮은 사람 ("The Similar Person")
7. 돌아갈 수 만 있다면 ("If I Could Go Back")
8. Life
9. 모르잖아요 ("You Don't Know")
10. 영원 그 다음까지... ("Until Forever After")
11. 내내 ("My My")
