= Crazy Waiting =

- Hangul: 기다리다 미쳐
- RR: Gidarida micheo
- MR: Kidarida mich'ŏ
- Directed by: Ryu Seung-jin
- Written by: Ryu Seung-jin
- Produced by: Oh Ki-min; Jeong Hoon-tak; Chun Seung-chul
- Starring: Son Tae-young; Jang Keun-suk; Jang Hee-jin; Danny Ahn
- Cinematography: Kim Cheol-ju
- Edited by: Shin Cheol; Song Seong-il
- Music by: Kim Jun-seok
- Distributed by: Cinema Service
- Release date: January 1, 2008
- Running time: 108 minutes
- Language: Korean

Crazy Waiting (Korean: 기다리다 미쳐; RR: Gidarida micheo), also known as The Longest 24 Months or Going Crazy Waiting, is a 2008 South Korean film written and directed by Ryu Seung-jin.

== Plot ==
In South Korea, all men in their early twenties have to serve two years of mandatory military service, and many young couples find themselves asking, "Do we stay together…or break up?" If they stay together, will their love survive the two-year separation? The movies look at four couples as they explore these questions and "go crazy while waiting" to be reunited with their lovers.

Hyo-jeong is dating the much-younger Won-jae when he leaves for military service, and his visits home put a strain on her wallet. Bo-ram has a crush on bandmate Min-cheol, who ignores her in favor of Han-na. Jin-ah and Eun-seok are the perfect, cutesy couple, but telling his best friend to take care of her turns out to be Eun-seok's mistake. High school student Bi-ang's reaction to live-in boyfriend Heo Wook's departure is to go out and find a replacement - innocent college student Ho Sin.

== Cast ==
- Son Tae-young as Kim Hyo-jeong
- Jang Keun-suk as Park Won-jae
- Jang Hee-jin as Nam Bo-ram
- Danny Ahn as Seo Min-cheol
- Yoo In-young as Kang Jin-ah
- Kim San-ho as Jeong Eun-seok
- Han Yeo-reum as Jo Bi-ang
- Woo Seung-min as Heo Wook
- Seo Min-woo as Ho Sin
- Lee Young-jin as Han-na
- Kim Tae-hyun as Jae-hyun
