= Shinhwa discography =

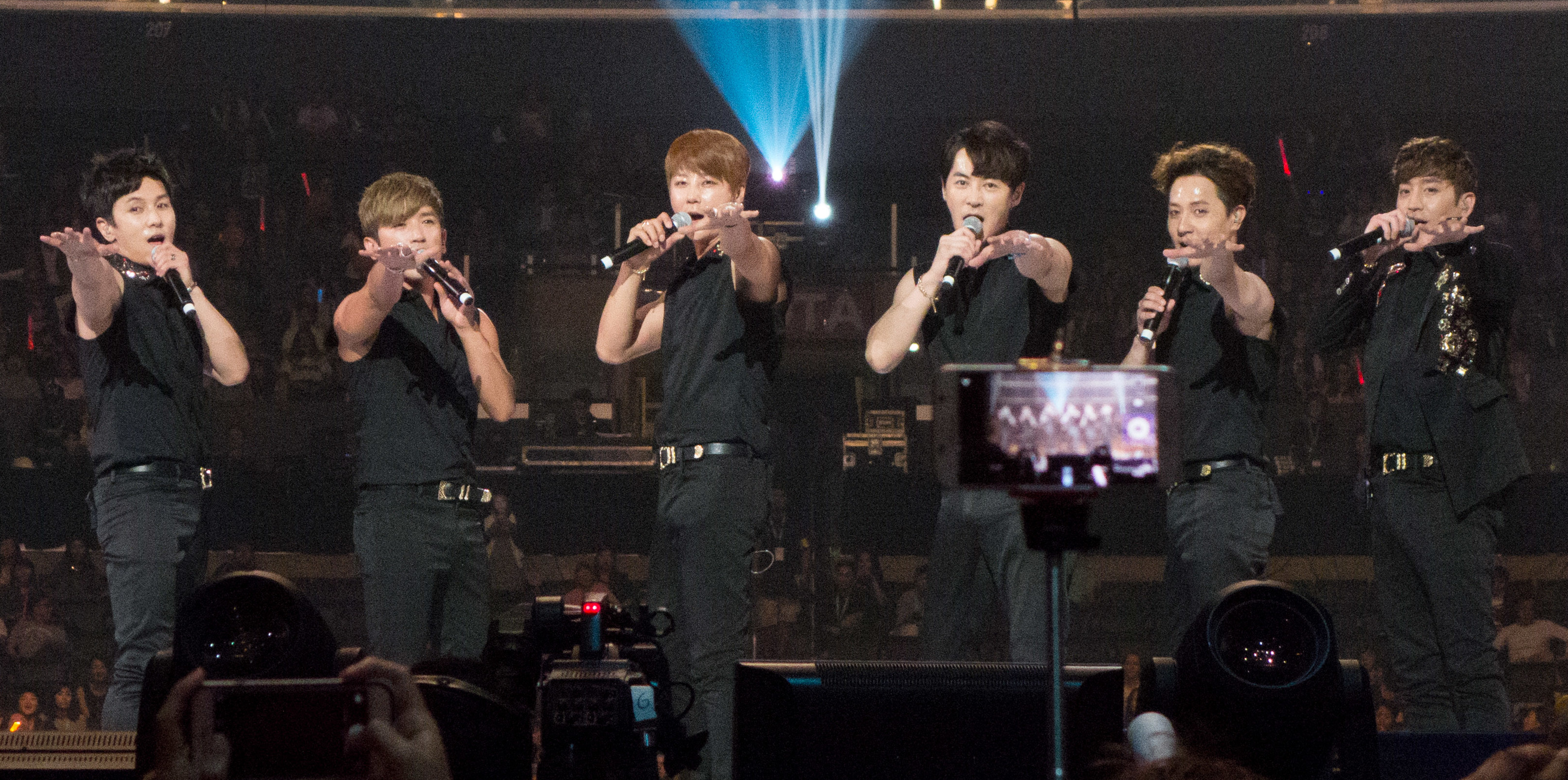
- Shinhwa in 2015
- Studio albums: 16
- Extended plays: 4
- Live albums: 3
- Compilation albums: 5
- Singles: 37
- Other appearances: 16
- Box sets: 1

The South Korean boy band Shinhwa has released fifteen studio albums, three live albums, five compilation albums, one box set, three EPs, thirty-four singles, and sixteen contributions to multi-artist compilations. Shinhwa was created by SM Entertainment and debuted in 1998 with the album Resolver. Under SM Entertainment, Shinhwa released six full-length studio albums and contributed to numerous SM Town compilation albums featuring other SM artists. Sixteen promotional, not-for-sale singles were also released. One greatest hits compilation, My Choice, was released by SM Entertainment in 2002 in South Korea.

After expiration of their contract with SM Entertainment in 2002, Shinhwa moved to Good EMG. Following discussions and compromises regarding the group's right to continued use of their name and to perform the music and choreography created while at SM, Shinhwa released their first album under Good EMG, titled Winter Story, in late 2003. Winter Story was the first of two albums and two EPs Shinhwa would eventually release with "Winter Story" in the titles. The albums are considered "special releases" and are usually not counted when assigning ordinals to Shinhwa's studio album releases in the media and by the group itself.

Thus, it was Shinhwa's next album release, Brand New in 2004, that was publicized as their seventh album, though technically it was their eighth. The success of Brand New brought the group two prestigious daesang (grand prize) awards for the year 2004, a first for the group. Shinhwa went on to release a total of eight albums and EPs under Good EMG, plus thirteen promotional singles. In 2006, they contracted with Nippon Columbia to release an album, Inspiration #1 and single "We Have the Sun in Our Hearts" targeted for the Japanese market. Shinhwa's first six Korean albums were released to the Japanese market in 2001 to 2003, and Avex Trax released three Korean-language greatest hits compilations in Japan and one in Taiwan.

2008 signaled the beginning of a four-year hiatus of Shinhwa's group activities, as five of the six members were required to fulfill their mandatory national military service. During the inactive period, Pony Canyon released a multi-disc box set collection of Shinhwa's Korean albums in Japan in 2009. In August 2011, in preparation for their post-military return to the music industry, Shinhwa established Shinhwa Company (briefly renamed ShinCom Entertainment during a copyright lawsuit), a joint venture to oversee Shinhwa's group activities. Since 2012, Shinhwa have released three full-length albums and four promotional singles, distributed through CJ E&M Music. They are one of the only Korean pop artists currently who continue to release full-length albums instead of a multitude of EPs and maxi-singles. They are also considered the longest-running idol group in Korea, having existed for 27 years with no changes in member lineup.

== Albums ==
=== Studio albums ===
List of studio albums, with selected chart positions and sales figures
Title	Album details	Peak chart positions				Sales
Title	Album details	KOR RIAK (Note: The Recording Industry Association of Korea (RIAK) released monthly rankings and sales figures for physical albums and singles from August 1998 to September 2008.)	KOR Gaon (Note: The Gaon Music Chart began releasing weekly rankings for physical albums and digital songs in 2010.)	JPN	US World	Sales
Resolver (해결사)	Released: May 9, 1998 (KOR); Label: SM Entertainment; Format: CD, cassette	33	—	—	—	KOR: 85,625
T.O.P.	Released: April 15, 1999 (KOR); Label: SM Entertainment; Format: CD, cassette	3	—	—	—	KOR: 377,500
Only One	Released: May 27, 2000 (KOR); Label: SM Entertainment; Format: CD, cassette	1	—	—	—	KOR: 423,873
Hey, Come On!	Released: June 28, 2001 (KOR); Label: SM Entertainment; Format: CD, cassette	3	6 (Note: According to the Gaon Album Chart, which began compiling data in 2010, Hey, Come On! peaked at number six on the weekly chart of November 13, 2013.)	—	—	KOR: 437,704
Perfect Man	Released: March 29, 2002 (KOR); Label: SM Entertainment; Format: CD, cassette	1	9 (Note: According to the Gaon Album Chart, which began compiling data in 2010, Perfect Man peaked at number nine on the weekly chart of November 13, 2013.)	99	—	KOR: 365,739
Wedding (너의 결혼식)	Released: December 27, 2002 (KOR); Label: SM Entertainment; Format: CD, cassette	3	8 (Note: According to the Gaon Album Chart, which began compiling data in 2010, Wedding peaked at number eight on the weekly chart of November 13, 2013.)	100	—	KOR: 284,073
Winter Story	Released: December 30, 2003 (KOR); Label: Good EMG, IO Music; Format: CD, cassette	3	—	253	—	KOR: 81,108
Brand New	Released: August 27, 2004 (KOR); Label: Good EMG, IO Music; Format: CD, cassette	1	—	100	—	KOR: 325,333
Winter Story 2004–2005	Released: December 18, 2004 (KOR); Label: Good EMG, CJ E&M Music; Format: CD, cassette	3	—	158	—	KOR: 102,345
State of the Art	Released: May 11, 2006 (KOR); Label: Good EMG, CJ E&M Music; Format: CD, cassette	1	—	—	—	KOR: 215,641
Inspiration #1	Released: August 16, 2006 (JPN); Label: Nippon Columbia; Format: CD	—	—	12	—	JPN: 15,000
Volume 9	Released: April 3, 2008 (KOR); Label: Good EMG, Vitamin Entertainment; Format: CD	1	—	155	—	KOR: 121,852
The Return	Released: March 22, 2012 (KOR); Label: Shinhwa Company, CJ E&M Music; Format: CD, digital download	N/A	3	—	—	KOR: 88,059
The Classic	Released: May 16, 2013 (KOR); Label: Shinhwa Company, CJ E&M Music; Format: CD, digital download	N/A	2	31	—	KOR: 78,727
We	Released: February 23, 2015 (KOR); Label: Shincom Entertainment, CJ E&M Music; Format: CD, digital download	N/A	2	—	6	KOR: 57,808
Unchanging: Touch	Released: January 2, 2017 (KOR); Label: Shinhwa Company, CJ E&M Music; Format: CD, digital download	N/A	2	—	—	KOR: 66,083
"—" denotes releases that did not chart or were not released in that region.

=== Live albums ===
List of live albums, with selected chart positions and sales figures
Title	Album details	Peak chart positions	Sales
Title	Album details	KOR RIAK	Sales
2001 1st Live Concert	Released: March 27, 2001 (KOR); Label: SM Entertainment (SMM-061); Format: CD	3	KOR: 108,199
The Everlasting Mythology: Shinhwa 2nd Concert	Released: October 7, 2003 (KOR); Label: SM Entertainment (SMM-071); Format: CD	—	
2005 Japan Tour Live Document	Released: March 24, 2006 (KOR); Label: Good EMG, Phantom Entertainment (FTECD-1003); Format: CD+DVD	—	
"—" denotes releases that did not chart or were not released in that region.

=== Compilation albums ===
List of compilation albums, with selected chart positions and sales figures
Title	Album details	Peak chart positions		Sales
Title	Album details	KOR RIAK	KOR Gaon	Sales
My Choice	Released: January 31, 2002 (KOR); Label: SM Entertainment (SM-023); Format: CD	4	17	KOR: 185,098
Perfect	Released: May 15, 2002 (JPN); Label: Avex Trax (AVCD-18028); Format: CD	—	—	
Best of Shinhwa 2001–2003	Released: September 18, 2003 (JPN); Label: Avex Trax (AVCD-18050/B); Format: CD	—	—	
Best Hits Collection 1998–2003	Released: December 16, 2003 (TWN); Label: Avex Taiwan (AVKCD80142/4); Format: CD	—	—	
Precious: Essential Collection	Released: March 30, 2005 (JPN); Label: Avex Trax (AVCD-18069/B); Format: CD	—	—	
"—" denotes releases that did not chart or were not released in that region.

=== Box sets ===
List of box sets
Title	Album details
Shinhwa CD Premium Box	Released: April 15, 2009 (JPN); Label: Pony Canyon (PCCA-02881); Format: 14 CDs

== Extended plays ==
List of extended plays, with selected chart positions and sales figures
Title	Details	Peak chart positions		Sales
Title	Details	KOR RIAK	KOR Gaon	Sales
Summer Story 2005	Released: August 5, 2005 (KOR); Label: Good EMG (MLCD-0036); Format: Digital single	—	—	
Winter Story 2006–2007	Released: January 25, 2007 (KOR); Label: Good EMG, Vitamin Entertainment (VDCD-6014); Format: CD, digital download	2	—	KOR: 20,654
Winter Story 2007	Released: December 5, 2007 (KOR); Label: Good EMG, Vitamin Entertainment (VDCD-6047); Format: CD, digital download	1	—	KOR: 24,585
Unchanging: Part 1 Orange	Released: November 29, 2016 (KOR); Label: Shinhwa Company, CJ E&M Music; Format: CD, digital download	N/A	2	KOR: 26,036
Heart	Released: August 28, 2018 (KOR); Label: Music&NEW; Format: CD, digital download	N/A	2	KOR: 56,398
"—" denotes releases that did not chart or were not released in that region.

== Singles ==
List of singles, with selected chart positions, showing year released and album name
Title	Year	Peak chart positions			Sales	Album
Title	Year	KOR	KOR Hot (Note: Billboard's K-pop Hot 100 ran from August 25, 2011 to May 17, 2014.)	JPN	Sales	Album
"Resolver" (해결사) (Note: These songs, originally titled in Korean (or Japanese), have no official English titles. Therefore, the translations provided here may differ from those in other sources.)	1998	—	—	—		Resolver
"Eusha! Eusha!" (으쌰! 으쌰!)	1998	—	—	—		Resolver
"Sharing Forever" (천일유혼)	1998	—	—	—		Resolver
"T.O.P. (Twinkling of Paradise)"	1999	—	—	—		T.O.P.
"Yo! (Brat Report)" (Yo! (악동보고서))	1999	—	—	—		T.O.P.
"Only One"	2000	—	—	—		Only One
"All Your Dreams"	2000	—	—	—		Only One
"First Love"	2000	—	—	—		Only One
"Wedding March (Your Side)" (Wedding March (너의 곁에서))	2000	—	—	—		Only One
"Hey, Come On!"	2001	—	—	—		Hey, Come On!
"Wild Eyes"	2001	—	—	—		Hey, Come On!
"My Life Style"	2002	—	—	—		My Choice
"Perfect Man"	2002	—	—	—		Perfect Man
"I Pray 4 U"	2002	—	—	—		Perfect Man
"Wedding" (너의 결혼식)	2002	—	—	—		Wedding)
"Addiction (Deep Sorrow)" (중독 (Deep Sorrow))	2002	—	—	—		Wedding)
"Young Gunz"	2004	—	—	—		Winter Story
"How Do I Say?"	2004	—	—	—		Remixes later included on Summer Story 2005
"Brand New"	2004	—	—	—		Brand New
"Fever (Crazy)" (열병 (Crazy))	2004	—	—	—		Brand New
"Oh!"	2004	—	—	—		Brand New
"Angel"	2004	—	—	—		Brand New
"2gether 4ever"	2004	—	—	—		Brand New
"Hey, Dude"	2005	—	—	—		Summer Story 2005
"Once in a Lifetime"	2006	—	—	—		State of the Art
"Throw My Fist"	2006	—	—	—		State of the Art
"You're My Everything"	2006	—	—	—		State of the Art
"We Have the Sun in Our Hearts" (僕らの心には太陽がある)	2006	—	—	9	JPN: 20,000 (phy.); KOR: 17,316 (phy.) (Note: Shinhwa's Japanese single, "We Have the Sun in Our Hearts", was released in South Korea as "우리들의 마음에는 태양이 있어" on September 6, 2006. The single was tracked on the RIAK's monthly "pop" chart for foreign music releases. The highest verifiable chart position is number 7 for the month of October 2006.)	Inspiration #1
"Just One More Time..." (다시 한번만...)	2008	—	—	—		Volume 9
"Run"	2008	—	—	—		Volume 9
"Evidence (Destiny of Love)" (흔적 (Destiny of Love))	2008	—	—	—		Volume 9
"Venus"	2012	6	6	—	KOR: 1,222,870	The Return
"This Love"	2013	3	5	—	KOR: 485,334	The Classic
"Memory"	2015	15	N/A	—		We
"Sniper" (표적)	2015	3	N/A	—	KOR: 243,375	We
"Orange" (오렌지)	2016	42	N/A	—		Unchanging: Part 1 Orange
"Touch" (터치)	2017	4	N/A	—	KOR: 172,367	Unchanging: Touch
"Kiss Me Like That"	2018	81	N/A	—		Heart
"—" denotes releases that did not chart or were not released in that region.

=== Other charted songs ===
List of songs, with selected chart positions
Title	Year	Peak chart positions		Album
Title	Year	KOR	KOR Hot	Album
"Be My Love"	2012	89	—	The Return
"Hurts"	2012	43	30	The Return
"Let It Go"	2012	83	—	The Return
"Move With Me"	2012	88	—	The Return
"On the Road"	2012	73	48	The Return
"Red Carpet"	2012	85	—	The Return
"Stay"	2012	84	—	The Return
"Welcome"	2012	97	—	The Return
"Acquainted Guy" (아는 남자)	2013	99	—	The Classic
"Alright"	2015	58	N/A	We
"Cat" (고양이)	2015	89	N/A	We
"Don't Cry"	2015	91	N/A	We
"Give It 2 Me"	2015	95	N/A	We
"Ice Moon" (얼음달)	2015	94	N/A	We
"I'm in Love"	2015	96	N/A	We
"White Shirts"	2015	87	N/A	We
"—" denotes releases that did not chart or were not released in that region.

== Other appearances ==
List of other non-single song appearances, showing year released and album name
Title	Year	Album
"Merry Christmas"	1999	Christmas in SMTown.com
"Prayer" (기도)	2000	Winter Vacation in SMTown.com
"Rudolph the Red-Nosed Reindeer" (루돌프 사슴코)	2000	Winter Vacation in SMTown.com
"White Paradise"	2000	Winter Vacation in SMTown.com
"We Wish You a Merry Christmas"	2001	Winter Vacation in SMTown.com – Angel Eyes
"White Love"	2001	Winter Vacation in SMTown.com – Angel Eyes
"12:00 N"	2001	Guardian Angel OST
"Hero"	2002	Summer Vacation in SMTown.com
"For This Time" (이번만큼은)	2002	2002 Winter Vacation in SMTown.com
"Silver Bells" (Shin Hye-sung with Kangta and Isak N Jiyeon)	2002	2002 Winter Vacation in SMTown.com
"Snow Baby" (Kim Dong-wan and Jun Jin with Fly to the Sky)	2002	2002 Winter Vacation in SMTown.com
"I Miss You" (Eric Mun and Andy Lee with Yoo Soo-young and Shinvi)	2002	2002 Winter Vacation in SMTown.com
"Look Out the Window" (창 밖을 보라) (Lee Min-woo with Moon Hee-jun)	2002	2002 Winter Vacation in SMTown.com
"I Pray 4 U" (Remix)	2003	2003 Summer Vacation in SMTown.com
"Just Be My Love"	2005	The 101st Proposal OST
"That Day" (그날이 오면)	2005	Super Rookie OST
