= Lee Min-woo discography =

Discography of South Korean Singer Lee Min-woo

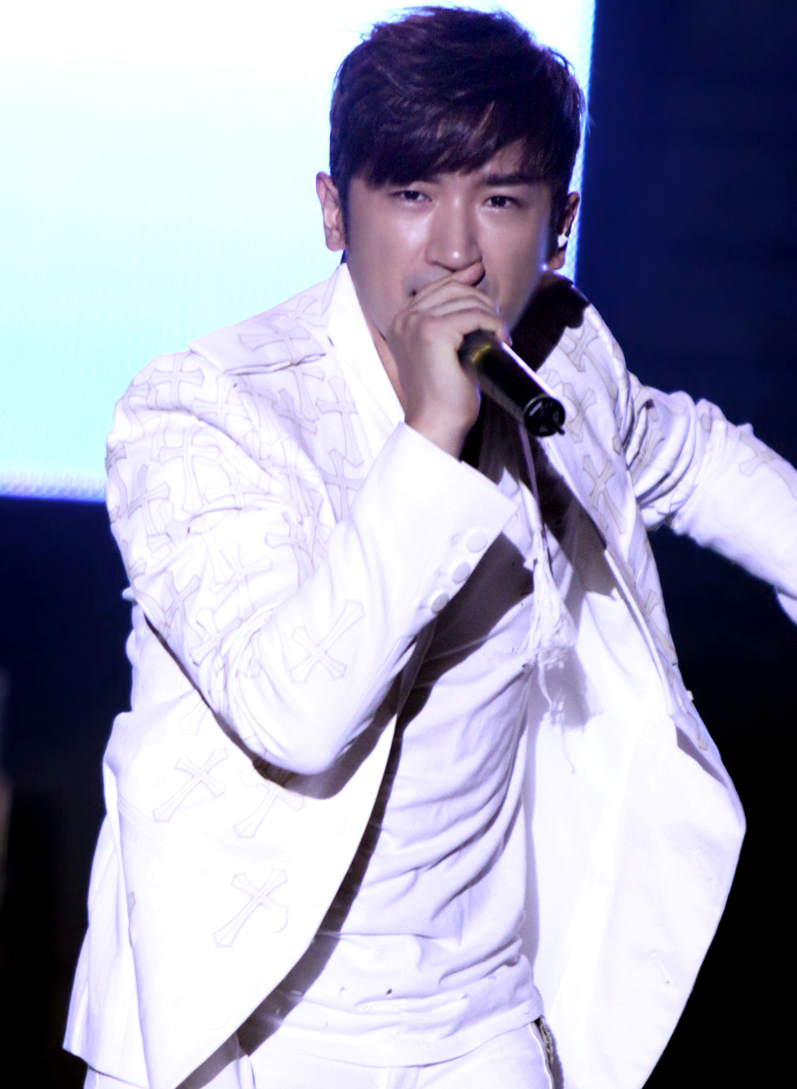
- Lee in 2012
- Studio albums: 4
- EPs: 3
- Live albums: 1
- Singles: 12
- Video albums: 5
- Music videos: 15

Lee Min-woo, under the name "M", has been a solo singer since 2003, and a member of Korean boyband Shinhwa since 1998. His solo material covers 4 studio albums, 3 EPs, one live album, and one single.

== Albums ==
=== Studio albums ===
Title	Album details	Peak chart positions		Sales
Title	Album details	KOR RIAK^{[A]}	JPN	Sales
Un-Touch-Able	Released: November 22, 2003; Label: IO Music, Good EMG; Format: CD; Track listing: 1. Intro; 2. Punch; 3. One in a Million (1/1000000); 4. Just One Night; 5. Sweet Girl; 6. Rain (비야); 7. Confused (착각); 8. Un-Touch-Able"; 9. Just Like (처럼); 10. Option; 11. To Y...; 12. ...Not What it Seems ("...없게 만들어요); 13. For You (To My Lovely Fans...)	3	—	KOR: 87,997+
IInd Winds	Released: September 3, 2005; Linage I Edition Released: September 10, 2005; Girl Friend Edition Released: November 15, 2005; Label: IO Music, Good EMG; Format: CD; Track listing: 1. Fighter; 2. Mirage (蜃氣樓 / 신기루); 3. Last, First Kiss; 4. Bump!!!; 5. Let Me Love You feat. Tablo of Epik High; 6. Girl Friend; 7. Interlude; 8. Sometimes; 9. Battle (Jump! Jump!); 10. L.U.V.; 11. Sweet Sound; 12. Overdoze" [Remix]	4	—	KOR: 122,104+
Explore M	Released: July 13, 2007; Re-released: October 4, 2007; Label: M Rising Entertainment, CJ E&M; Format: CD; Track listing Original: 1. Showdown" feat. Eric; 2. The 'M' Style feat. Tablo; 3. Boy Friend"; 4. Stomp feat. Dyna-Mic; 5. La Noche Bonita; 6. AM 07:05; 7. Play My Song feat. Tiger JK & T 8. You Merely (Untouchable Part II) (너 뿐이라고); 9. Pretty Woman; 10. One Last Cry; 11. L.O.V.E.; 12. My Child (98/03/24); Repackage: 1. "Showdown" feat. Eric; 2. The 'M' Style feat. Tablo; 3. La Noche Bonita; 4. Boy Friend; 5. AM 07:05; 6. Play My Song feat. Tiger JK & T 7. Pretty Woman; 8. Explore 'M'; 9. Stomp feat. Dyna-Mic; 10. One Last Cry; 11. L.O.V.E.; 12. My Child (98/03/24); 13. You Merely [Acoustic Edition Part II] (너 뿐이라고); 14. The 'M' Style [Electric-D Mix]	3	217	KOR: 41,007+
M Rizing	Released: September 24, 2008; Label: LOEN Entertainment, Good EMG; Format: CD; Track listing: 1. I'm Here; 2. Don't Trust Men feat. BigTone (남자를 믿지마); 3. I 'M' U feat. Mighty Mouth; 4. Forgive (용서해); 5. Hot! feat. Son Dam-bi; 6. Wonderful Life (멋진 인생); 7. Masquerade feat. BigTone (가면 무도회); 8. Wink Show" (윙크 쇼); 9. Honey Pickup feat. Yubin of Wonder Girls (Honey 꼬시기); 10. Sad Song; 11. Inverse Girl (반한 Girl); 12. My White Space (M’s Epilogue) (나의 여백 (M's Epilogue)	27	—	KOR: 16,485+

=== Live albums ===
Title	Album details	Peak chart positions	Sales
Title	Album details	KOR	Sales
Live Works 2006-2007	Released: March 22, 2007; Label: Vitamin Entertainment, Good EMG; Format: CD; Track listing Disc 1: 1. Un-Touch-Able; 2. Punch; 3. Fighter; 4. Mirage (신기루); 5. One In A Million; 6. If You...; 7. Last, First Kiss; 8. Just Like (처럼); 9. New Kids on the Block Medley (Please Don't Go Girl/The Right Stuff/Cover Girl); Disc 2: 1. Just One Night; 2. Let Me Love U 3. So Sick; 4. Jazz Cafe; 5. SexyBack; 6. Sweet Sound; 7. Beautiful Goodbye (아름다운 이별) + Girl Friend; 8. Bump!!; 9. 흐린 기억속의 그대; 10. Battle	6	KOR: 9,583+

== Extended plays ==
Title	Album details	Peak chart positions		Sales
Title	Album details	KOR RIAK^{[A]}	KOR Gaon^{[B]}	Sales
The Sentimental Reason	Released: February 14, 2008; Label: M Rising Entertainment, CJ E&M; Formats: CD; Track listing: 1. Just One More Night; 2. Believe in Love; 3. Love is Two Beautiful Letters with C-Luv (사랑이란 예쁜 두 글자); 4. Back to the Funk — M’s Life; 5. Believe in Love [M’s Sentimental Version]; 6. Just One More Night [M’s Romanticize Version]	2	—	KOR: 11,060+
Minnovation	Released: June 23, 2009; Label: M Rising Entertainment, LOEN Entertainment; Format: CD; Track listing: 1. Minnovation; 2. Love Me Ice Cream; 3. Summer Time; 4. The Road to Home (나 집으로 가는 길); 5. Masquerade [Outsidaz Club Remix] (가면 무도회); 6. The 'M' Style [BK Remix]	^{[B]}	—	KOR: 13,000+
M+Ten	Released: February 6, 2014; Label: Liveworks, CJ E&M; Format: CD, digital download; Track listing: 1. No Limit; 2. Love Supreme; 3. Taxi feat. Eric; 4. Kiss It Away; 5. Thriller	—	4	KOR: 10,344+

== Singles ==
Title	Year	Peak chart positions		Album
Title	Year	KOR RIAK^{[A]}	KOR Gaon^{[B]}	Album
"Rain" (비야)	2003	—	—	Un-Touch-Able
"Just One Night"	2003	—	—	Un-Touch-Able
"If You..."	2005	4	—	Non-album single
"Last, First Kiss"	2005	—	—	IInd Winds
"Bump! ! !"	2005	—	—	IInd Winds
"Girl Friend"	2005	—	—	IInd Winds
"Sometimes"	2005	—	—	IInd Winds
"Stomp" feat. Dyna-Mic	2007	—	—	Explore M
"The 'M' Style" feat. Tablo	2007	—	—	Explore M
"Don't Trust Men" (남자를 믿지마) feat. BigTone	2008	—	—	M Rizing
"Minnovation"	2009	—	—	Minnovation
"Taxi" feat. Eric	2014	—	31	M+Ten

== Video albums ==
Title	Album details
Girl Friend Live Concert 2006	Released: July 24, 2006; Agency: Taewon Entertainment; Format: DVD
Live Works 2006-2007	Released: September 28, 2007; Agency: Taewon Entertainment; Format: DVD
Live Works 2006-2007 Live at Zepp Tokyo	Released: November 21, 2007; Agency: Pony Canyon; Format: DVD
Explore M ~2008 M Style Japan Live	Released: December 10, 2008; Agency: Geneon Entertainment; Format: DVD
X10mas 2013 Christmas Live	Released: July 24, 2014; Agency: Liveworks; Format: DVD
Inside M+Ten: Special Documentary	Released: November 20, 2014; Agency: Liveworks; Format: DVD

== Music videos ==
Title	Year
"Biya"	2003
"Just One Night"	2003
"If You"	2005
"Last, First Kiss"	2005
"Bump! ! !"	2005
"Battle"	2005
"Girl Friend"	2005
"Sometimes"	2005
"Cinderella's Magic" - Cici Wang feat. Minwoo	2006
"Eraser" – SAT & M	2007
"A Ring" - Hye-ryung feat. Minwoo	2007
"Stomp"	2007
"The 'M' Style"	2007
"Don't Trust Men" feat. BigTone	2008
"Minnovation"	2009
"Taxi"	2014

== Songwriting credits ==
Lee is composer, lyricist, and producer. He has written many songs for Shinhwa and for other Korean singers.

- For Solo Album:
1. 1st album : Punch, Sweet Girl
2. 2nd album : Fighter, Bump, Let me love you, Sometimes, Battle (Jump, jump), LUV, Shingiru
3. 3rd album : Showdown, The "M" Style, Boyfriend, Stomp, Pretty Woman, My Child (98/03/24)
4. 4th album : I'm Here, I'M'U, Forgive Me, HOT, Wonderful Life, Wink Show, Seducing Honey, Sad Song
5. Mini album: Back to the Funk — M's Life
- For Shinhwa's Album:
1. 1st concert : My Everything
2. 2nd concert : Make Money, Yo
3. 3rd album : Soul
4. 4th album : Reminiscence
5. 5th album : Free
6. 6th album : Lost in Love, Later, 79
7. 7th album : All of My, Oh, U
8. 8th album : Paradise
9. 9th album : Run, SO IN LOVE, Destiny of Love
10. 10th album : Venus, Red Carpet, Stay, Be my love
11. 11th album : That's right, New me, Hurricane, I gave you
- For other singers:
1. Jewelry : Superstar, One More Time
2. Lyn : Sunshine (feat. Eric)
3. SAT : Eraser (As a producer)
4. Kim Dong-wan : My Love (feat. Eric)
5. Wonder Girls : Move
6. Andy Lee: Never Give Up (feat. Eric, Dongwan, Minwoo)
7. V.O.S: Beautiful Life
8. 4Minute: "Femme Fatale" from Volume Up

== Notes ==
- A The Recording Industry Association Korea (RIAK) tracked physical album, EP, and singles sales and released a consolidated sales and ranking chart monthly from January 1999 to September 2008. It did not track digital sales.
- B The Gaon Music Chart began releasing data in 2010 after the Recording Industry Association Korea stopped compiling data in October 2008. Online sources for charts released after September 2008 and before January 2010 are currently unavailable.
