= Andy Lee (South Korean singer) =

South Korean singer

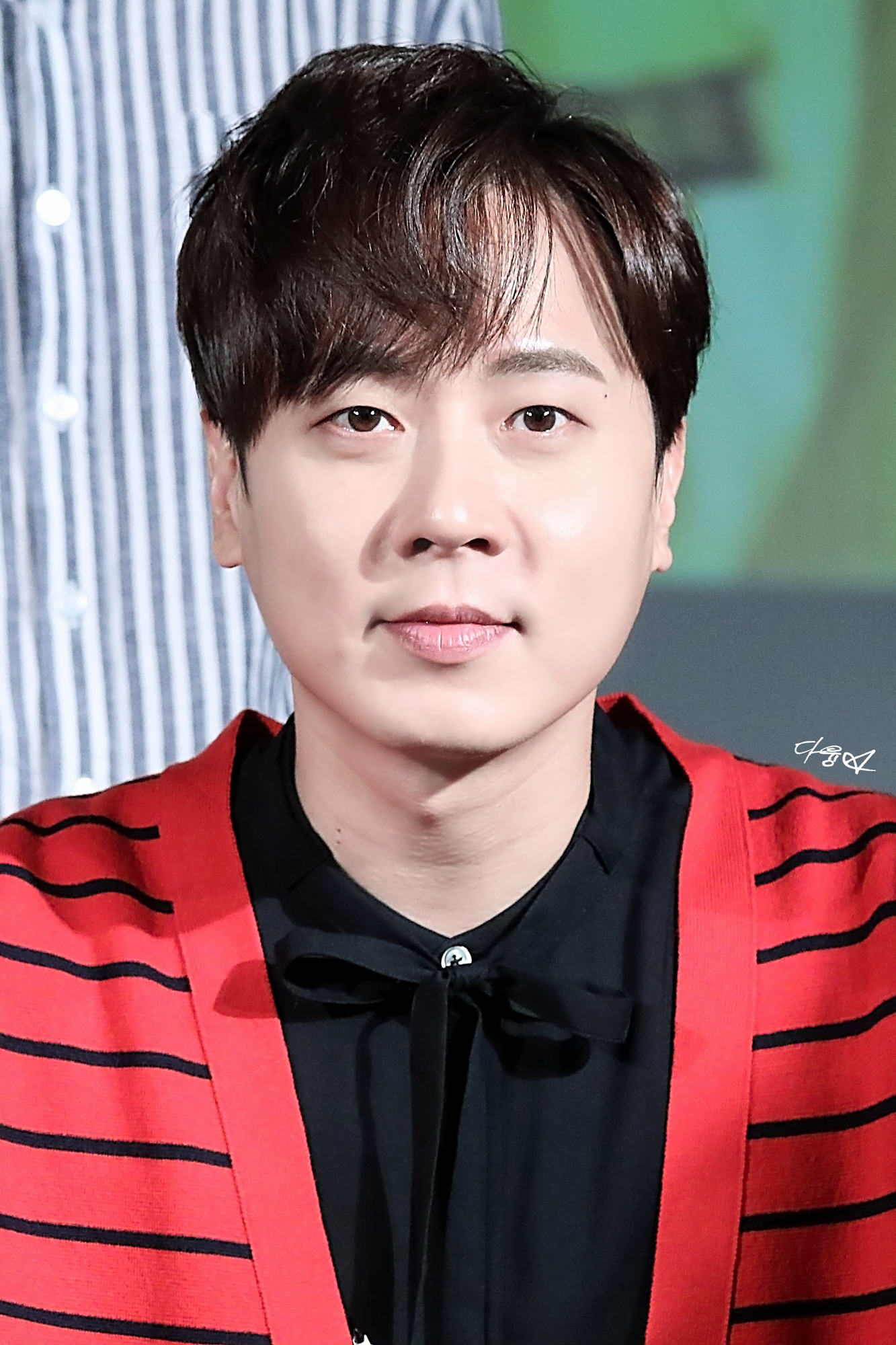
- Lee in 2018

Background information
- Also known as: Jason Lee
- Born: Lee Sun-ho; January 21, 1981 (age 45); Seoul, South Korea
- Genres: K-pop; dance; hip hop
- Occupations: singer; actor; rapper; record producer
- Years active: 1998–present
- Labels: SM Entertainment; Good Entertainment; TOP Media; Shinhwa Company
- Member of: Shinhwa
- Spouse: Lee Eun-joo (m. 2022)
- Website: official website http://www.shinhwacompany.co.kr/

- Andy Lee
- Hangul: 이선호
- Hanja: 李先皓
- RR: I Seonho
- MR: I Sŏnho

Lee Sun-ho (Korean: 이선호; born January 21, 1981), mononymously credited as Andy Lee (앤디), is a South Korean singer, rapper, actor, record producer, and member of boy band Shinhwa. Besides rapping for his band, Andy has ventured out into television acting, musicals, and solo singing. Andy is also the producer of duo Jumper and boy groups Teen Top, 100% and Up10tion.

== Biography ==
=== Pre-debut ===
Andy Lee was raised in the San Fernando Valley area of Los Angeles, and had been a student at John F. Kennedy High School before moving to Seoul. He then completed high school at Korea Kent Foreign School in Seoul. Lee was the second member to join Shinhwa. He originally planned to be a member of H.O.T. (another Korean boy band) with his friend Tony Ahn. However, his parents pulled their support for him joining H.O.T. because they thought he was too young. Nevertheless, he continued to stay with the management of H.O.T. and was even featured as a rapper on female group S.E.S.'s single I'm Your Girl along with Eric Mun (Mun would later join Lee in Shinhwa as lead rapper).

When Andy was older, his parents let him join Shinhwa. He would continue with Shinhwa until the group's fourth album when he took some time out to study in the U.S. (he later confessed that it actually was due to his care for seriously sick mother). For the group's fifth album Perfect Man he returned and has been with the group ever since. His real English name was actually Jason, but SM Entertainment persuaded him to change it before his debut.

=== 2003: Solo artist ===
In 2003, when the members of Shinhwa began doing solo activities, Lee surprised everyone by being an actor on various dramas, most notably the drama Lovers In Prague. Although he had a very minor role in the drama, it gained many viewers because of his role as a completely different, serious person. He began appearing in many banjun drama as well alongside former Fin.K.L member Lee Jin. The two acted together in numerous other banjun dramas as well as a couple for 6 months, longer than any other couple or actors/actresses did on the show segment for which they gained a lot of popularity due to their perfect match and chemistry. Lee was also an MC on SBS Inkigayo and MBC Goldfish, though in January 2007, he step down from being MC on both SBS Inkigayo and MBC Goldfish in a period of 3 days (SBS Inkigayo on January 28 & MBC Goldfish on January 31).

In 2007, Lee left his group's management to set up his own company, ND (New Dream) Entertainment, concentrating on his solo career. As Shinhwa was on hiatus, Lee return to acting in September 2007 to act as the lead role in a musical "Music In My Heart (Season 3)", a type of project that none of the Shinhwa members have tried to pursue yet. After finishing performances for the musical, Lee released his very first digital single, titled "Irrelevant [or Extraordinary] Imagination" on November 30, 2007, a cover from the group Rollercoaster's song. Due to the help of Park Jin Young (also known as JYP; CEO of JYP Entertainment) and Yubin of Wonder Girls, Lee was able to have a successful single. Yubin rapped while JYP wrote the lyrics for the rap part in the song. With the help, Lee was able to attract a lot of attention for the single. By releasing the digital single as well, Lee became the 5th member in Shinhwa to go solo behind Lee Min-woo, Shin Hye-sung, Jun Jin, and Kim Dong-wan, leaving Eric Mun as the only member to have not yet pursue a solo singing career.

In March 2008, Andy joined MBC's reality show We Got Married where he was a couple with singer Solbi to act out the lives of newlyweds. Solbi and Andy made their official exit from We Got Married on October 5, 2008. He has taken an active career in stage such as playing as playing a 19-year-old in the musical Polaroid in August 2008, as well as live concerts throughout September and October. He has also produced a two-member boy band called Jumper under his company ND Entertainment. They have released two singles titled YES! featuring Eric and 눈이부셔 (Sparkling Eyes) featuring Kang Jiyoung of Kara.

=== 2009-2011: Military service ===
In November 2009, Lee commenced an Asia tour with stops in Taipei, Tokyo and Shanghai and concluded it just after Christmas and held a fan meeting, Andy Farewell Party-Bye for now a week before his enlistment. He enlisted for his mandatory military service on 11 January 2010 for 21 months of active duty at the Ministry of National Defense in Yongsan-gu, Seoul. He was discharged on 31 October 2011.

In 2010, TOP Media, Andy's agency, debuted its first boy band Teen Top.

=== 2012: Shinhwa comeback and boy band 100% ===
In March 2012, Lee reunited with his Shinhwa bandmates for their comeback after four years, under the management of 'Shinhwa Company'. It is a joint venture agency for members to perform as a group, of which Eric and Lee Min-woo are co-CEOs and the remaining members are shareholders. The Company manages the group as a whole, whilst members' individual activities are managed by their respective agencies. The group released their tenth studio album The Return on 23 March 2012, launched their comeback concerts 2012 Shinhwa Grand Tour: The Return throughout Asia and their first exclusive variety program Shinhwa Broadcast premiered on 17 March 2012 on cable channel JTBC.

In September, under TOP Media, he launched a new seven-member boy band 100% which debuted with the hit single "Bad Guy".

=== 2013: Gambling conviction and hiatus ===
In November 2013, Lee was indicted with illegally gambling on soccer matches, resulting in a fine of 5 million KRW. Shinhwa apologized on-air for Lee's crime in December 2013 and Lee withdrew from all individual and group activities. As part of the hiatus, Lee's previously filmed appearances on broadcast shows such as "Shinhwa Broadcast" were edited out. In February 2014, television station Munhwa Broadcasting Corporation (MBC) announced Lee would be banned from broadcasting on the network.

In October 2014, Lee was announced to be returning with his group mates in a Chinese concert that was broadcast on Seoul Broadcasting System (SBS) Inkigayo in January 2015. Soon after Shinhwa announced its February 2015 comeback with a full-length album, MBC announced it is lifting the ban on Lee.

== Personal life ==
On January 19, 2022, Andy wrote a letter announcing his marriage, posting it on his personal SNS. Andy's fiancée is announcer Lee Eun-joo of Jeju MBC, who is 9 years younger than him. On January 25, it was confirmed that Lee will get married on June 12.

== Discography ==
=== Studio albums ===
Title	Details	Peak chart positions	Track listing
Title	Details	KOR (RIAK)	Track listing
The First New Dream repackaged: The First Propose	Release Date: January 18, 2008 (SDL-0083); Repackage Release Date: April 29, 2008 (SDL-0108); Label: TOP Media, ND Entertainment; Sales: 17,783	2	The First New Dream: 1. New Dream (Intro); 2. Love Song; 3. Timing (ft. Chae Yeon); 4. U Turn (ft. Rock); 5. 바라고 또 바라고 (Hope For Hope); 6. 우리, 사랑할까요? (ft. Byul) (Shall We Fall In Love?); 7. 얼굴 빨개졌다네 (Face Turned Red); 8. 널 생각해 (ft. Eric, Amin & J) (Thinking Of You); 9. Never Give Up (t. Eric, Kim Dong-wan & Lee Min-woo); 10. 엉뚱한 상상 (ft, Yubin of Wonder Girls) (Extraordinary Imagination); 11. 거짓말 (Lies); 12. Music In My Heart (duet with An Yoo-jin); The First Propose: 1. Propose; 2. Love Song; 3. Timing (ft. Chae Yeon); 4. U Turn (ft. Rock); 5. 바라고 또 바라고 (Hope For Hope); 6. 우리, 사랑할까요? (ft. Byul) (Shall We Fall In Love?); 7. 얼굴 빨개졌다네 (Face Turned Red); 8. 널 생각해 (ft. Eric, Amin & J) (Thinking Of You); 9. Never Give Up (t. Eric, Kim Dong-wan & Lee Min-woo); 10. 엉뚱한 상상 (ft, Yubin of Wonder Girls (Extraordinary Imagination); 11. 거짓말 (Lies); 12. Music In My Heart (duet with An Yoo-jin)
Single Man	Release Date: October 29, 2009 (KTMCD-0048); Reissue Date: February 22, 2013 (WMCD-0178); Label: TOP Media; Language: Korean	N/A^{[A]}	Track listing: 1. Intro (가제); 2. Single Man; 3. 너만 (Only You); 4. It's OK, 힘을내! (It's OK, I Can Do It!); 5. Your Luv; 6. 사랑에 멈추다 (Stop By Love); 7. 너뿐이야 (It Could Only Be You); 8. To My Love (For My Fans...); 9. 짝사랑 (One-Sided Love); 10. Single Man (Inst.)

=== Singles ===
Title	Details	Album
"엉뚱한 상상" (Extraordinary Imagination)	Release Date: November 30, 2007; Label: TOP Media; Format: Digital single; Language: Korean	The First New Dream
"사랑하면 보내야 하는건데" (If You Love Her, Then Let Her Go)	Release Date: August 6, 2008; Format: Digital Single; Language: Korean	from the musical Polaroid
"사랑 하나 (네게 배운 말...)" (ft. Kim Dong-wan) (One Love (You Taught Me))	Release Date: January, 2010; Label: TOP Media; Format: Single; Language: Korean	N/A
"You and Me"	Release Date: January 21, 2013; Label: TOP Media; Format: Digital single; Language: Korean	N/A

=== DVD ===
Title	Details	Peak chart positions	Track listing
Title	Details	JPN (Oricon)	Track listing
The First... 6日間の小さな奇蹟 (The First... The 6 Day Miracle)	Release Date: June 6, 2008 (MNPS-54); Label: Format: DVD; Language: Korean	186	Track listing Disc 1 Concert: 1. New Dream (Intro); 2. Love Song; 3. Timing; 4. U Turn; 5. 願ってまた願って (Hope For Hope); 6. 私たち、愛しましょうか? (Shall We Fall In Love?); 7. 顔が真っ赤になったね (Face Turned Red); 8. 君を思ってる; 9. Never Give Up; 10. とんでもない想像 (Extraordinary Imagination); 11. 嘘(ゴジッマル) (Lies); 12. Music In My Heart; Disc 2 Bonus: 1. Highlights; 2. Concert Making; 3. Photo Gallery; Disc 3 Bonus: 1. Japan & China Fan Meeting Making
The First ... 6일간의 작은 기적 (The First... The 6 Day Miracle)	Release Date: June 13, 2008; Label: TOP Media, ND Entertainment; Format DVD; Language: Korean	-	Track listing Disc 1 Concert: 1. Intro - 엉뚱한 상상 (Extraordinary Imagination); 2. Opening Ment; 3. 얼굴 빨게 졌다네 (Face Turned Red); 4. U Turn; 5. Timing; 6. VPB I - 뮤지컬 영상 (Musical Clip); 7. Music In My Heart; 8. Bridge Ment I 9. 거짓말 (Lies); 10. Bridge Ment II; 11. 당신은 사랑받기 위해 태어난 사람; 12. Talk with Shinhwa; 13. 내 눈물 모아; 14. Bridge Ment III; 15. 그녀를 만나는 곳 100m전 (Met Her 100m Away); 16. 잠 못 드는 밤 비는 내리고 (Rain On A Sleepless Night); 17. VPB II - 신화 영상 (Shinhwa Clip); 18. First Love; 19. Bridge Ment IV; 20. 우리, 사랑할까요? (Shall We Fall In Love?); 21. VPB III - 솔로 First 영사 (First Solo Clip); 22. 바라고 또 바라고 (Hope For Hope); 23. Ending Ment; 24. 러브송 (Love Song); 25. 으쌰! 으쌰! (Eusha Eusha); Disc 2 Bonus: 1. Ready To Concert; 2. Concert Diary: 1st Day - Orange, 2nd Day - Yellow, 3rd Day - Pink, 4th Day - Red, 5th Day - Olive, 6th Day - White; 3. Color Of Day: The First Music (10 Years of Shinhwa & Andy's First Step), Haha Yellow (Entertainer Andy), Sweety Pink Day (Music In My Heart), Happy Birthday (Andy's Birthday), Step By Step (And in the Future... Performer Andy), Lee Sun Ho (Andy's House); 4. All-VPB: Opening Intro, Album Preparation Clip, Musical Clip, Japan Free Time, First Solo Clip, Never Give Up; 5. Photo Gallery
The First Propose In Tokyo	Release Date: April 7, 2009; Label: TOP Media, ND Entertainment, SBSi Corp.; Format: DVD; Language: Korean	-	Track listing Disc 1 Concert: 1. Intro; 2. Love Song; 3. 엉뚱한 상상 (Extraordinary Imagination); 4. Timing; 5. 바라고 또 바라고 (Hope For Hope); 6. Music In My Heart; 7. U Turn; 8. First Love; 9. 그녀를 만나는 곳 100m 전 (Met Her 100m Away); 10. 우리, 사랑할까요? (Shall We Fall In Love?); 11. I Love You; 12. Love Of My Life; 13. 얼굴 빨개졌다네 (Face Turned Red); 14. 아스피린 (Aspirin); 15. 잠 못 드는 밤 비는 내리고 (Rain On A Sleepless Night); 16. Propose; 17. 으쌰! 으쌰! (Encore Ver.) (Eusha Eusha); 18. 엉뚱한 상상 (Encore Ver.) (Extraordinary Imagination); 19. 얼굴 빨개졌다네 (Encore Ver.) (Face Turned Red); 20. 아스피린 (Encore Ver.) (Aspirin); Disc 2 Concert Special: 1. Tokyo Concert Making; 2. Shanghai Concert Highlight; 3. Multi Angles: Love Song, Propose; Disc 3 Special Feature: 1. Musical Making Film; 2. Andy's France Story

== Filmography ==
=== Film ===
Year	Title	Hangul	Notes	Ref.
2002	Emergency Act 19	긴급조치 19호	with Shinhwa	

=== Television series ===
Year	Title	Hangul	Role	Notes/Ref.
2003-4	Nonstop 4	논스톱 4		Sitcom
2005	Banjun Drama	반전드라마		Drama
2005	Lovers in Prague	프라하의 연인	Ji Seung-woo	Drama
2009	Two Wives	두 아내	Yoon Nam-joon	Drama

=== Variety shows ===
Year	Title	Role	Notes/Ref.
2008	We Got Married	Regular Cast	Andy was paired with Sol-bi (Season 1, Episodes 1-28)
2008	Andy's French Kiss		
2012	Teen Top Rising 100%		
2018–2019	Grandma's Restaurant in Samcheong-dong	Regular Cast	Manager, Kitchen Assisten
2022	Same Bed, Different Dreams 2: You Are My Destiny	Cast Member	

=== MC ===
Year	Title	Hangul	Notes	Ref.
2003	Beautiful Sunday	뷰티풀선데이		
2005-7	Inkigayo	인기가요		
2006-7	Golden Fishery	황금어장		
2012	E! 'K-STAR' News			
2019	Doldabang (Idol Cafe)	아이돌다방	With Yoo Seon-ho	

=== Musical ===
Year	Title	Details
2007	Music In My Heart (Season 3)	Dates: September 7 – December 2, 2007
2008	Polaroid	Dates: August 3–24, 2008; Venue: PMC Daehangno Jayu Theater in Hyehwa-dong, Jongno-gu
2008	Singles	Dates: November 13 – December 31, 2008

== Notes ==
- A The Gaon Music Chart began releasing data in 2010 after the Music Industry Association of Korea stopped compiling data in 2008. Online sources for charts after September 2008 and before January 2010 are currently unavailable.
