= Volume 9 (Shinhwa album) =

- Volume 9 cover

Studio album by Shinhwa
- Released: April 3, 2008
- Recorded: 2008
- Genres: K-pop; dance
- Length: 34:25
- Language: Korean
- Labels: Good Entertainment; Warner Music Korea

Shinhwa chronology
Winter Story 2007 (2007)	Volume 9 (2008)	The Return (2012)

Singles from Volume 9
- 1. "One More Time" Released: March 24, 2008; 2. "Run" Released: April 3, 2008

Professional ratings
Review scores
Source	Rating
KoME	(favorable)

Volume 9, also known as 10th Anniversary album, is the ninth studio album of South Korean boy band Shinhwa. It was released on April 3, 2008, by Good Entertainment, marking the group's 10th anniversary. It was first released as a First Press Limited Edition, with 50,000 copies, each with a hologram serial number and a 120-page photobook. The regular edition was released a week later on April 10. "One More Time", a ballad track, was the lead track to be released, as a digital single on March 24, 2008. It was the group's last album released prior to their enlistment, as well as their final album released under Good Entertainment.

A 20,000 copies repackaged White Edition was released on July 3, 2008, which included new track, "Destiny of Love" and a music video which feature footage from their Shinhwa Must Go On: 10th Anniversary Live concert held on March 29 and 30, 2008 at the Olympic Gymnastics Arena, Seoul.

== Music videos ==
The music video for "Destiny of Love" feature footages from Shinhwa Must Go On: 10th Anniversary Live concert in Seoul. "Run" was the next track to be released with a promotional music video.

== Commercial performance ==
Shinhwa did limited promotional activities for this album, due to members' solo activities, and it sold over 100,000 copies in the first month. It was ranked 1st in album sales for the April monthly chart, but did not chart in May; and it charted at #25 in June and #3 in July.

== Tracks ==
Volume 9 track listing
No.	Title	Lyrics	Music	Arrangement	Length
1.	"Last Train Home"	N/A	Vink	Vink	1:08
2.	"Voyage"	Vink, Eric Mun, Brian Kim	Vink	Vink	4:01
3.	"다시 한번만..." (Just One More Time...)	Choi Kam-won, Eric Mun, Brian Kim	Kim Jae-seok	Kim Jae-seok	4:21
4.	"Free Style #1"	Eric Mun	Eric Mun	Eric Mun	0:52
5.	"Run"	Lee Min-woo, Eric Mun	Lee Min-woo	Lee Min-woo	3:37
6.	"2 Ma Luv..."	Jang Joon-ho, Park Jang-geun, Eric Mun, David Kim	Jang Joon-ho	Jang Joon-ho	3:29
7.	"We Can Get it On" (feat. David Kim)	Eric Mun, David Kim	Eric Mun	Eric Mun	4:23
8.	"So In Love"	Lee Min-woo, Eric Mun, David Kim	Kwon Tae-eun	Kwon Tae-eun	3:28
9.	"기억나니?" (Do You Remember?)				5:13
10.	"아직 못다한 이야기" (An Unfinished Story)	Lee Sang-in	Lee Sang-in	Lee Sang-in	3:53
Total length:					34:25

White Edition (repackage) track listing
No.	Title	Lyrics	Music	Arrangement	Length
1.	"Last Train Home"	N/A	Vink	Vink	1:08
2.	"흔적" (Destiny of Love)	Shin Hye-sung	Lee Min-woo	Lee Min-woo, Kang Bong-gu	5:35
3.	"다시 한번만..." (Just One More Time...)	Choi Kam-won, Eric Mun, Brian Kim	Kim Jae-seok	Kim Jae-seok	4:21
4.	"Free Style #1"	Eric Mun	Eric Mun	Eric Mun	0:52
5.	"Run"	Lee Min-woo, Eric Mun	Lee Min-woo	Lee Min-woo	3:37
6.	"2 Ma Luv..."	Jang Joon-ho, Park Jang-geun, Eric Mun, David Kim	Jang Joon-ho	Jang Joon-ho	3:29
7.	"We Can Get it On" (feat. David Kim)	Eric Mun, David Kim	Eric Mun	Eric Mun	4:23
8.	"So In Love"	Lee Min-woo, Eric Mun, David Kim	Kwon Tae-eun	Kwon Tae-eun	3:28
9.	"기억나니?" (Do You Remember?)				5:13
10.	"아직 못다한 이야기" (An Unfinished Story)	Lee Sang-in	Lee Sang-in	Lee Sang-in	3:53
Total length:					35:59

== Credits and personnel ==
Credits are adapted from the album liner notes.

- Park Kwon-young – producer
- Lee Jang-eon – producer
- Shinhwa – producer
- Kang Bong-gu – producer
- Park Hyeok – sound engineer
- Jeon Hoon – mastering engineer
- Jeong Ku-hyeon – guitar ("Voyage")
- Sam Lee – guitar ("Just One More Time", "2 Ma Luv...", "So In Love")
- Ko Tae-young – guitar ("Run", "An Unfinished Story")
- K-Strings – strings ("Voyage")
- Kim Jae-seok – piano, keyboard ("Just One More Time", "2 Ma Luv...")

== Charts ==
Chart	Peak position	Sales
Korea Monthly Albums (RIAK) April 2008	1	KOR: 121,852

== Release history ==
Country	Date	Distributing label	Format
South Korea	April 3, 2008	Good EMG, Vitamin Entertainment	Collectors' Edition CD (VDCD-6061)
South Korea	April 10, 2008	Good EMG, Vitamin Entertainment	CD (VDCD-6062)
South Korea	April 14, 2008	Good EMG, Vitamin Entertainment	Overseas Edition CD (VDCD-6)
South Korea	July 2, 2008	Good EMG, Vitamin Entertainment	White Edition CD (VDCD-6068)
Japan	September 17, 2008	Pony Canyon	CD (PCCA-02755)
