= Inspiration (Shinhwa album) =

Inspiration #1

Studio album by Shinhwa
- Released: August 16, 2006
- Recorded: 2006
- Genre: J-pop; dance
- Length: 55:18
- Language: Japanese
- Label: Good Entertainment; Columbia Music Entertainment

Shinhwa chronology
State of the Art (2006)	Inspiration #1 (2006)	Winter Story 2006-2007 (2006)

Singles from Inspiration #1
- 1. "Sun in Our Hearts" Released: June 14, 2006

Inspiration #1 is the first Japanese studio album of South Korean boy band Shinhwa. It was released on August 16, 2006. The album peaked at number 12 on the Oricon Albums Chart in Japan.

== Background and release ==
After releasing State of the Art in May 2006, Shinhwa quickly began preparing their first Japanese album and single. As preparation work for their Japanese album release, Shinhwa held a press conference in Japan on April 14, 2006, in addition to performing at Mnet's anniversary celebration in Japan on April 15, 2006. The press conference came as a result of Shinhwa's effort to break into the Japanese market. Shinhwa released first Japanese language single "Sun in Our Hearts" on June 14, 2006, which debuted at number nine on the Oricon Singles Chart. Their first official album, Inspiration #1, was released in Japan on August 16, 2006.

== Track listing ==
Inspiration #1 track listing
No.	Title	Lyrics	Music	Arrangement	Length
1.	"Girls Exclusive"	Lauren, Eric Mun, David Kim	Deckstream, Lauren	Deckstream, Lauren	3:14
2.	"Throw My Fist" (Japanese Version)		Ryu Hyeong-seob	Mad Soul Child	3:46
3.	"Midnight Girl" (Japanese Version)		Park Chang-hyeon	Park Chang-hyeon	4:14
4.	"Paradise"	Lee Min-woo, Eric Mun, Brian Kim	Jeong Joon-ho	Jeong Joon-ho	3:58
5.	"僕らの心には太陽がある" (Sun in Our Hearts)	Yoshi, Eric Mun, David Kim		Ryu Hyeong-seob	5:29
6.	"Highway Star"	Seo Jeong-hwan, Eric Mun, David Kim	Mad Soul Child	Mad Soul Child	3:44
7.	"Time Machine" (Japanese Version)		Park Geun-tae	Jo Young-soo	4:07
8.	"The Street"	Park Ki-wan	Park Ki-wan	Park Ki-wan	3:39
9.	"Sun Flower ~Happy Birthday~"	Asami, Eric Mun, David Kim		Uru	4:58
10.	"Weak ~君を失くして" (Weak ~Kimi wo Nakushite)	An Young-min, Eric Mun, David Kim	An Young-min	An Young-min	3:40
11.	"You're My Everything"	Lee Yoon-hwan, Eric Mun, David Kim	Kim Ki-beom	Kim Do-hoon	3:59
12.	"Once in a Lifetime" (English Version)	T	Brian Kim	Kang Bong-gu, Ryu Hyeong-seob, Brian Kim	4:56
13.	"Shooting Star" (Yukihiro Fukutomi Remix)	Brian Kim	Brian Kim	Yukihiro Fukutomi	5:34
Total length:					55:18

== Chart performance ==
Chart	Peak position
Japan Weekly Albums (Oricon)	12

== Release history ==
Country	Date	Distributing label	Format
Japan	August 16, 2006	Nippon Columbia	CD (COCP-33820)
Japan	August 16, 2006	Nippon Columbia	CD+DVD (COZA-210/1)
