= State of the Art (Shinhwa album) =

Studio album by Shinhwa
- Released: May 11, 2006
- Recorded: 2006
- Studio: GoodSound Studio; Rui Studio; Silk Studio; Eungeon Studio; Dream Factory; Momo Studio
- Genre: K-pop; dance
- Length: 47:35
- Language: Korean
- Label: Good Entertainment; Universal Music Taiwan

Shinhwa chronology
Winter Story 2004–2005 (2004)	State of the Art (2006)	Inspiration #1 (2006)

Singles from State of the Art
- 1. "Once in a Lifetime" Released: May 11, 2006; 2. "Throw My Fist" Released: May 11, 2006; 3. "You're My Everything" Released: May 11, 2006

State of the Art is a studio album by South Korean boy band Shinhwa. It was released on May 11, 2006, by Good Entertainment, and represents the group's eighth major album release (tenth overall). It was the third best-selling album of 2006 in South Korea with over 215,000 copies.

== Background and release ==
A special edition version of State of the Art also released, containing bonus remix tracks of "Throw My Fist" and "Midnight Girl" and a DVD with behind-the-scenes footage. The album was released in Taiwan on October 5, 2006, by Universal Music Taiwan in two versions, including one with a bonus DVD.

The music video for "Once in a Lifetime", was directed by Cho Soo-hyun, who also directed the music video for Psy's "Gangnam Style" and "Gentleman"; and also the music video for "This Love" from Shinhwa's The Classic album in 2013.

== Composition and recording ==
State of the Art twelve tracks. It was recorded at GoodSound Studio, Rui Studio, Silk Studio, Eungeon (은건) Studio, Dream Factory, and Momo Studio in 2006. Shinhwa member Lee Minwoo composed the lyrics for the song "Paradise", and member Eric Mun composed the rap lyrics for all songs, alongside David Kim.

== Commercial performance ==
The album debuted on the Recording Industry Association Korea (RIAK) chart for the month of July 2006, with 161,452 copies sold The album finished 2006 at number 3 on South Korea's year-end charts, with total sales of 215,641 copies.

== Accolades ==
Awards and nominations
Year	Organization	Category	Nominee	Result	Ref.
2006	Golden Disc Awards	Album Bonsang (Main Prize)	State of the Art	Won	
2006	Golden Disc Awards	Album Daesang (Grand Prize)	State of the Art	Nominated	
2006	Mnet KM Music Festival	Album of the Year	State of the Art	Nominated	
2006	Mnet KM Music Festival	Yepp Netizen Popularity Award	"One in a Lifetime"	Won	
2006	Mnet KM Music Festival	Overseas Viewers' Award	"One in a Lifetime"	Won	
2006	Mnet KM Music Festival	Best Group	"One in a Lifetime"	Nominated	
2006	SBS Gayo Daejeon	Main Prize (Bonsang)	State of the Art	Won	
2006	SBS Gayo Daejeon	Grand Prize (Daesang)	State of the Art	Nominated	

Music program awards for "Once in a Lifetime"
Program	Date	Ref.
Inkigayo	June 11, 2006	
Inkigayo	June 18, 2006	
M Countdown	June 22, 2006	

== Promotion and live performances ==
=== Shinhwa 2006 Tour "State of the Art" ===
Shinhwa embarked on a concert tour shortly after the release of State of the Art on May 13, 2006. They became the first Korean artist to hold a solo concert in Singapore on September 10, 2006, which attracted around 10,000 fans.

List of tour dates
Date	City	Country	Venue	Attendance
May 13, 2006	Seoul	South Korea	Olympic Gymnastics Arena	24,000
May 14, 2006	Seoul	South Korea	Olympic Gymnastics Arena	24,000
July 8, 2006	Shanghai	China	Shanghai Grand Stage	10,000
July 15, 2006	Busan	South Korea	BEXCO Hall 1	10,000
August 19, 2006	Bangkok	Thailand	Impact Arena	4,000
September 10, 2006	Singapore		Singapore Indoor Stadium	10,000
Total				58,000

== Track listing ==
State of the Art track listing
No.	Title	Lyrics	Music	Arrangement	Length
1.	"Thanks!"	Shin Yoo (Max), Hwang Seong-jae (BJJ), Eric Mun, David Kim	S.J. Hwang	S.J. Hwang	3:44
2.	"Your Man"	Lee Sang-in, Brian Kim, E. Mun, D. Kim	S.I. Lee	S.I. Lee	3:35
3.	"Weak Man" (Korean: 약한 남자)	An Young-min, E. Mun, B. Kim	Y.M. An	Y.M. An	3:37
4.	"Once in a Lifetime"	B. Kim, E. Mun	B. Kim	Kang Bong-gu, Ryu Hyeong-seob, B. Kim	4:46
5.	"Doobob"	Y.M. An, E. Mun, D. Kim	Jo Young-soo	Y.S. Jo, Mordny	3:31
6.	"Paradise"	Lee Min-woo, D. Kim, E. Mun	J.H. Jeong	J.H. Jeong	3:57
7.	"Highway Star (feat. Ivy)"	Seo Jeong-hwan, E. Mun, D. Kim	Mad Soul Child	Mad Soul Child	3:44
8.	"Midnight Girl"	Park Chang-hyeon, E. Mun, D. Kim	C.H. Park	C.H. Park	4:12
9.	"Throw My Fist"	B. Kim, E. Mun, D. Kim	Ryu Hyeong-seob	H.S. Ryu	3:44
10.	"Chance" (Korean: 기회)	Jeon Seung-woo, E. Mun, D. Kim	S.W. Jeon	S.W. Jeon	4:06
11.	"Why Me..." (Korean: 왜 내가...)	Yoon Kyeong	Lee Hyeon-jeong	H.J. Lee, Jeong Byeong-gyu	4:16
12.	"You're My Everything"	Lee Yoon-hwan, E. Mun, D. Kim	Kim Ki-beom	Kim Do-hoon	3:59
Total length:					47:11

State of the Art Special Edition
No.	Title	Lyrics	Music	Arrangement	Length
1.	"Thanks!"	Shin Yoo (Max), Hwang Seong-jae (BJJ), Eric Mun, David Kim	S.J. Hwang	S.J. Hwang	3:44
2.	"Your Man"	Lee Sang-in, Brian Kim, E. Mun, D. Kim	S.I. Lee	S.I. Lee	3:35
3.	"Weak Man" (Korean: 약한 남자)	An Young-min, E. Mun, B. Kim	Y.M. An	Y.M. An	3:37
4.	"Once in a Lifetime"	B. Kim, E. Mun	B. Kim	Kang Bong-gu, Ryu Hyeong-seob, B. Kim	4:46
5.	"Doobob"	Y.M. An, E. Mun, D. Kim	Jo Young-soo	Y.S. Jo, Mordny	3:31
6.	"Paradise"	Lee Min-woo, D. Kim, E. Mun	J.H. Jeong	J.H. Jeong	3:57
7.	"Highway Star (feat. Ivy)"	Seo Jeong-hwan, E. Mun, D. Kim	Mad Soul Child	Mad Soul Child	3:44
8.	"Midnight Girl"	Park Chang-hyeon, E. Mun, D. Kim	C.H. Park	C.H. Park	4:12
9.	"Throw My Fist"	B. Kim, E. Mun, D. Kim	Ryu Hyeong-seob	H.S. Ryu	3:44
10.	"Chance" (Korean: 기회)	Jeon Seung-woo, E. Mun, D. Kim	S.W. Jeon	S.W. Jeon	4:06
11.	"Why Me..." (Korean: 왜 내가...)	Yoon Kyeong	Lee Hyeon-jeong	H.J. Lee, Jeong Byeong-gyu	4:16
12.	"You're My Everything"	Lee Yoon-hwan, E. Mun, D. Kim	Kim Ki-beom	Kim Do-hoon	3:59
13.	"Throw My Fist" (Solid Groove Mix Version)	B. Kim, E. Mun, D. Kim	H. S. Ryu	Mad Soul Child	3:44
14.	"Midnight Girl" (Pop Ballad Version)	C.H. Park	C.H. Park	H.S. Ryu	4:43
Total length:					55:38

== Credits and personnel ==
Credits are adapted from the album liner notes.

- Park Kwun-young – producer
- Shinhwa – co-producer
- Lee Jang-eon – co-producer
- Park Bong-gu – music producer
- Park Hyeok – sound engineer
- Choi Hyo-young – mastering
- Sam Lee – guitar ("Thanks!", "Doobob", "Chance", "Why Me...")
- Ko Tae-young – guitar ("Your Man", "Once in a Lifetime", "Throw My Fist", "Midnight Girl (Pop Ballad Ver.)")
- Park Su-won – guitar ("Highway Star")
- Hong Joon-ho – guitar ("Midnight Girl", "You're My Everything")
- Cho Joon-soo – bass ("Midnight Girl (Pop Ballad Ver.)"
- K-Strings – strings ("Weak Man", "Once in a Lifetime", "Throw My Fist", "Why Me...")
- Shin Min – string arrangement ("Weak Man", "Why Me...")
- Lee Na-il – string arrangement ("Once in a Lifetime", "Throw My Fist")
- Ryu Hyeong-seob – string arrangement ("Throw My Fist")
- Hwang Seong-jae – programming, keyboards ("Thanks!")
- Jang Ji-won – keyboards ("Once in a Lifetime", "Midnight Girl (Pop Ballad Ver.)")
- Kang Su-hyo – drums ("Once in a Lifetime")
- Jang Sang-hyeon – drums ("Midnight Girl (Pop Ballad Ver.)")

== Charts and sales ==
=== Monthly charts ===
Chart (August 2006)	Peak position
South Korean Albums (RIAK)	1

=== Yearly charts ===
Chart (2006)	Position
South Korean Albums (RIAK)	3

=== Sales ===
Region	Sales
South Korea (RIAK)	215,641

== Release history ==
Country	Date	Distributing label	Format
South Korea	May 10, 2006	Good EMG, CJ E&M	CD (CMBC-0648); Cassette (CMBM-0648)
South Korea	June 28, 2006	Good EMG, CJ E&M	Digital disc (CMBC-0664)
South Korea	August 16, 2006	Good EMG, CJ E&M	Special Edition (CD+DVD) (CMBC-0685)
Taiwan	October 5, 2006	Universal Music Taiwan	CD (984 394-6)
Taiwan	October 5, 2006	Universal Music Taiwan	CD+DVD (984 394-5)
