= 4 Wheeled Restaurant =

Korean television program

- Season 4 promotional poster
- Hangul: 현지에서 먹힐까
- Lit.: Will the Locals Eat It?
- RR: Hyeonjieseo meokhilkka
- MR: Hyŏnjiesŏ mŏkhilkka
- Genre: Variety show; Cooking show; Reality show
- Starring: Various artistes
- Country of origin: South Korea
- Original language: Korean
- No. of seasons: 4
- No. of episodes: 41

Production
- Production locations: South Korea, Thailand, China and USA
- Running time: 90 – 100 minutes

Original release
- Network: tvN
- Release: 27 March 2018 – 19 May 2020

4 Wheeled Restaurant (Korean: 현지에서 먹힐까) is a South Korean reality cooking show. The show presents various Korean chefs cooking in the country their cuisine originated from. The aim is to open a food truck and see if their cooking is accepted in the origin country as if it was in Korea.

Season 1 was aired on Tuesdays on tvN from 27 March 2018 at 11 p.m. (KST) as chefs traveled to cities in Thailand and the season ended on 15 May 2018.

Season 2 was aired on Saturdays on tvN from 8 September 2018 at 6 p.m. (KST) as new chefs traveled to cities in China. The season ended on 17 November 2018.

Season 3 was aired on Thursdays on tvN from 18 April 2019 at 11 p.m. (KST) as another new team of chefs traveled to cities in the United States. The season ended on 4 July 2019.

Season 4 was aired on Tuesdays on tvN from 19 May 2020 at 10:30 p.m. (KST) as a completely new crew of chefs take part in the domestic spin-off version of the show, Will They Eat When Delivered (배달해서 먹힐까). The season ended on 21 July 2020.

== Concept ==
The first-season cast members are restaurateur and television personality Hong Seok-cheon, boy band Shinhwa's Lee Min-woo and actor Yeo Jin-goo. Seok-cheon, an owner of a number of Thai restaurants, along with the other two members operated a Thai food truck in cities in Thailand. Their aim is to see if Thai people would eat Seok-cheon's version of Thai food.

The second-season cast members are Korean-Chinese cuisine chef Lee Yeon-bok, actors Kim Kang-woo and Seo Eun-soo, and comedian Heo Kyung-hwan. They operated a Chinese food truck all around China.

The third-season cast members are boy band Shinhwa's Eric Mun and Lee Min-woo, singer John Park with Korean-Chinese cuisine chef Lee Yeon-bok and comedian Heo Kyung-hwan. Jung Joon-young was initially cast for the filming in Los Angeles and Shinhwa's Lee Min-woo was being cast for filming in San Francisco. However, due to Jung Joon-young's involvement in the Burning Sun scandal, the production team decided to completely remove all of Jung Joon-young's footage.

The fourth season, a domestic spin-off of the show named Will They Eat When Delivered (배달해서 먹힐까), stars Italian cuisine chef Sam Kim, television personality Ahn Jung-hwan, and singers Yoon Doo-joon of Highlight and Jeong Se-woon. They operated a kitchen in South Korea (Yeonnam-dong, Mapo District, Seoul) and made Italian food. They are only available for delivery through ordering with food delivery applications or calling in to the kitchen to order. The cast members' identities are unknown to the customers, except for the hints appearing on the packages of the food.

== Airtime ==
Season	Airdate	Broadcast Start Time (KST)
1	27 March – 15 May 2018	Tuesdays 11 p.m.
2	8 September – 17 November 2018	Saturdays 6 p.m.
3	18 April – 4 July 2019	Thursdays 11 p.m.
4	19 May – 21 July 2020	Tuesdays 10:30 p.m.

== Cast ==
=== Season 1 (Thailand) ===
Name	Episode	Notes
Hong Seok-cheon	1 – 8	
Lee Min-woo (Shinhwa)	1 – 8	
Yeo Jin-goo	1 – 8	

=== Season 2 (China) ===
Name	Episode	Notes
Lee Yeon-bok	1 – 11	
Kim Kang-woo	1 – 11	
Seo Eun-soo	1 – 11	
Heo Kyung-hwan	1 – 11	

=== Season 3 (United States) ===
Name	Episode	Notes
Lee Yeon-bok	1 – 12	
Eric Mun (Shinhwa)	1 – 12	
John Park	1 – 12	
Heo Kyung-hwan	1 – 12	
Lee Min-woo (Shinhwa)	7 – 12	

=== Season 4 - Spin-off (South Korea) ===
Name	Episode	Notes
Sam Kim	1 – 10	
Ahn Jung-hwan	1 – 10	
Yoon Doo-joon (Highlight)	1 – 10	
Jeong Se-woon	1 – 10	

== Ratings ==
- In the ratings below, the highest rating for the show will be in red and the lowest rating for the show will be in blue.
- Note that the show airs on a cable channel (pay TV), which plays part in its slower uptake and relatively small audience share when compared to programs broadcast (FTA) on public networks such as KBS, SBS, MBC or EBS.

=== Season 1 ===
Season 1 Promotional Poster

2018		AGB Nielsen Ratings
Episode	Broadcast date	Nationwide
1	27 March	1.853%
2	3 April	1.567%
3	10 April	1.367%
4	17 April	1.432%
5	24 April	1.569%
6	1 May	1.578%
7	8 May	1.881%
8	15 May	1.311%

=== Season 2 ===
Season 2 Promotional Poster

2018		AGB Nielsen Ratings
Episode	Broadcast date	Nationwide
1	8 September	3.778%
2	15 September	4.088%
3	22 September	4.110%
4	29 September	4.578%
5	6 October	5.359%
6	13 October	4.017%
7	20 October	4.190%
8	27 October	4.854%
9	3 November	4.510%
10	10 November	4.609%
11	17 November	3.398%

=== Season 3 ===
Season 3 Promotional Poster

2019		AGB Nielsen Ratings
Episode	Broadcast date	Nationwide
1	18 April	3.981%
2	25 April	3.280%
3	2 May	3.661%
4	9 May	4.995%
5	16 May	5.205%
6	23 May	5.429%
7	30 May	4.017%
8	6 June	4.223%
9	13 June	3.811%
10	20 June	4.128%
11	27 June	4.445%
12	4 July	2.911%

=== Season 4 ===
2020		AGB Nielsen Ratings
Episode	Broadcast date	Nationwide
1	19 May	1.754%
2	26 May	1.642%
3	2 June	1.327%
4	9 June	1.078%
5	16 June	1.031%
6	23 June	1.018%
7	30 June	1.019%
8	7 July	0.932%
9	14 July	0.989%
10	21 July	0.934%
