= Winter Story 2004–2005 =

Studio album by Shinhwa
- Released: December 17, 2004
- Recorded: 2004
- Genre: K-pop; dance
- Length: 56:22
- Language: Korean
- Label: Good Entertainment

Shinhwa chronology
Brand New (2004)	Winter Story 2004–2005 (2004)	State of the Art (2006)

Singles from Winter Story 2004–2005
- 1. "How Do I Say" Released: December 17, 2004

Winter Story 2004–2005 is a compilation album by Korean musical group Shinhwa. It was released on December 17, 2004, making it the group's second Winter Story album. It contained covers of various songs released in South Korea during the 1980s and 1990s. The album met with same success as the other albums released by Shinhwa. Their single, "How Do I Say," became a hit throughout Asia.

== Tracks ==
Winter Story 2004–2005 track listing
No.	Title	Lyrics	Music	Arrangement	Length
1.	"Rain on a Sleepless Night" (잠 못 드는 밤 비는 내리고)	Kim Chang-han, Park Kwang-hyeon, Brian Kim, Eric Mun	C.H. Kim, K.H. Park, Ryu Hyeong-seong	H.S. Ryu	4:27
2.	"Red String" (천생연분)	Kim Soo-hyeon, Eric Mun	Jeong Jae-yoon	Hwang Sang-jae	3:41
3.	"Erase All of Time" (세월의 흔적 다 버리고)	Jeong Seok-won, M.A.R.S., Eric Mun	S.W. Jeong	M.A.R.S.	4:40
4.	"That Girl on the Second Floor" (이층집 소녀)	Park Joo-yeon	Yoon Jong-shin	B. Kim	4:25
5.	"Love of the New Generation" (신인류의 사랑)	S.W. Jeong, Eric Mun, Sang-won (the Anomi)	S.W. Jeong	Sang-won (the Anomi)	3:49
6.	"On a Night Like This" (오늘 같은 밤이면)	Park Jeong-woon, Eric Mun, Sang-won (the Anomi)	J.W. Park	Sang-won (the Anomi)	4:05
7.	"Painfully Loving You" (그 아픔까지 사랑한거야)	Lee Ji-young, Kang Bong-gu	Shin Jae-hong	Ryu Hyeong-seob	3:59
8.	"Red Sunset" (붉은 노을)	Lee Young-hoon, David Kim	Y.H. Lee	Yoon Ji-woong	4:18
9.	"Your Tears" (그대 눈물까지도)	Oh Ji-hoon	J.H. Oh	H.S. Ryu	3:50
10.	"Hi" (안녕)	Shin Hae-cheol	H.C. Shin	B. Kim	3:25
11.	"Say It" (말해줘)	Lee Hyeon-do, Sean, Jinu	H.D. Lee	B. Kim	3:39
12.	"Met Her 100 Meters Away" (그녀를 만나는 곳 100m전)	No Young-shim	Lee Nam-woo	Yoon Ja-young	3:35
13.	"Erase All of Time (feat. Lyn)" (세월의 흔적 다 버리고)	S.W. Jeong, Eric Mun	S.W. Jeong	M.A.R.S.	4:21
14.	"How Do I Say"	JPS	Kim Jin-won, JPS	J.W. Kim, JPS	4:08
Total length:					56:22

== Credits and personnel ==
Credits are adapted from the liner notes of Winter Story 2004–2005.

- Song Kyeong-jo – recording engineer
- Kwon Jeong-shin – recording engineer
- Song Yong-deok – recording engineer
- Jeong Eun-kyeong – recording engineer
- Kim Min-ee – recording engineer
- Heo Eun-sook – recording engineer
- Na In-kyu – recording engineer
- Kim Han-gu – mixing engineer
- Park Hyeok – mixing engineer
- Kim Young-seong – mixing engineer
- Choi Hyo-young – mastering engineer
- Sam Lee – guitar
- Lee Seong-ryeol – guitar
- Lee Tae-woon – bass
- Heo Jae-hyeok – bass
- Im Seung-beom – keyboard
- Kim Dong-ha – trumpet

== Charts ==
Chart	Peak position	Sales
Korea Monthly Albums (RIAK) December 2004	3	KOR: 102,345
Korea Yearly Albums (RIAK) 2004	41	KOR: 102,345

== Release history ==
Country	Date	Distributing label	Format
South Korea	December 20, 2004	Good EMG, CJ E&M	CD (CMBC-0638)
Japan	March 9, 2005	EMI Music Japan	CD (VJCP-68732)
