= Eccentric! Chef Moon =

2020 South Korean television series

- Promotional poster
- Hangul: 유별나! 문셰프
- RR: Yubyeolla! Munsyepeu
- MR: Yubyŏlla! Munsyep'ŭ
- Genre: Drama; Romantic comedy
- Created by: Channel A
- Written by: Kim Kyung-soo; Jung Yu-ri
- Directed by: Choi Do-hoon; Jung Hyun-soo
- Starring: Eric Mun; Go Won-hee
- Composer: Studios SNOW
- Country of origin: South Korea
- Original language: Korean
- No. of episodes: 16

Production
- Camera setup: Multiple-camera setup
- Running time: 70 minutes
- Production companies: Glovic Entertainment; Story Networks

Original release
- Network: Channel A
- Release: March 27 – May 16, 2020

Eccentric! Chef Moon (Korean: 유별나! 문셰프; RR: Yubyeolla! munsyepeu) is a 2020 South Korean television series produced by Glovic Entertainment and Story Networks for Channel A, starring Eric Mun and Go Won-hee. The drama is a healing romantic comedy that follows the life and love of a star chef Moon Seung-mo and a reckless famous fashion designer Yoo Yoo-jin after they meet each other at Seoha Village. It aired on Channel A every Friday and Saturday at 10:50 (KST) from March 27 to May 16, 2020.

== Synopsis ==
Moon Seung-mo (Eric Mun) is a popular star chef and the only son of the 80-year-old traditional Korean 'Pungcheonok' pork soup restaurant. He is also responsible for creating the fine Korean cuisine dining boom through pop-up restaurants. He loves to cook with organic ingredients while the current culinary environment is filled with food made with MSG and problematic ingredients. After his parent died suddenly from a fire, he decides to move to the quaint Seoha Village.

Meanwhile, Yoo Yoo-jin (Go Won-hee), also known as Yoo Bella, is a renowned fashion designer. She moves to Seoha Village after losing her memory from an accident which results in her acting completely different than her usual glamorous self. Due to her reckless behavior, she earns the nickname "Yoobyeolna"(unique, oddball) among the village locals.

Moon Seung-mo's peaceful daily life suddenly turns upside down with the sudden appearance of Yoo Yoo-jin at the village.

== Cast ==
=== Main ===
- Eric Mun as Moon Seung-mo, star chef and the only son of the 80-year-old traditional Korean 'Pungcheonok' pork soup restaurant.
- Go Won-hee as Yoo Yoo-jin, a world-renowned fashion designer who lost her memory after an accident.

=== Supporting ===
- Choi Kwang-je as Bang Da-hoo, Moon Seung-mo's best friend.
- Cha Jung-won as Im Hyun-ah. She plays a person who feels inferior and envious to designer Yoo Bella.
- Go Do-yeon as Kim Sul-ah, 7-year-old girl who claims Moon Seung-mo is her father.
- Ahn Nae-sang as Im Chul-young.
- Lee Seung-yeon as Han Mi-young, the daughter of the president of a big corporation and wife of Im Chul-yong (Ahn Nae-sang).
- Jang Jae-ho as Kang Jun-su, a representative of Donghan Food.
- Lee Seo-hwan as Dr. Cho, a self-proclaimed doctor-turned-professor. He plays a grasshopper-like character who goes around the village and pretends to know farming.
- Lee Seung-chul as chairman of Donghan Food.
- Song Ji-woo as Gong Hyo-sook, a student and aspiring model.

=== Others ===
- Jung Gyoo-soo as Moon Byung-hak, Seung Mo's father (Ep.1-3,9)

=== Special appearances ===
- Kim Jung-hwa as Yoo Hyo-myung, a super model turned fashion designer. She is talented and beautiful. Yoo Hyo-myung is connected to a series of events that happen at the beginning of the drama.
- Henny Savenije as Louis Belmont CEO of a big French fashion brand. Desperate to get a contract with Bella
- Jang Gwang as Moon Byung-hak's friend (Ep.8)

== Production ==
The first script reading took place on November 16, 2019.

As per the production website, the early working title of the series is Vacation in Your Own Way (제멋대로 바캉스; Jemeotdaero bakangseu). It was changed to Yoobyeolna!! Chef Moon as the production progressed.

== Release ==
The drama's premiere was postponed by 3 weeks amid the COVID-19 outbreak in South Korea.
