= Winter Story 2007 =

- Winter Story 2007 cover

EP by Shinhwa
- Released: 5 December 2007
- Recorded: 2007
- Genre: K-pop, Dance
- Language: Korean
- Label: Vitamin Entertainment
- Producer: Good Entertainment

Shinhwa chronology
Winter Story 2006–2007 (2007)	Winter Story 2007 (2007)	Volume 9 (2008)

Winter Story 2007 is the fourth release in the Winter Story album series by the South Korean boy band Shinhwa. It was released on 5 December 2007 by Good Entertainment and distributed by Vitamin Entertainment. It is the group's first album in 11 months, since the release of Winter Story 2006–2007 in January 2007. It is also named differently compared to the rest of the series, having dropped '2008' suffix.

The album featured three new tracks: "Game", "I’ll Never Let You Go", a Shinhwa’s signature dance song with strong beats and addictive rhythm, and mid-tempo "The Snowy Night" produced by leader Eric.

== Track listing ==
N.B. lead tracks in bold

1. "Game"
2. "I'll Never Let You Go"
3. **"눈 오는 날" (The Snowy Night)**

== Music video ==
- "눈 오는 날" (The Snowy Night)

== Chart performance ==
Chart	Peak position	Sales
Korea Monthly Albums (RIAK) December 2007	3	KOR: 24,585
Korea Yearly Albums (RIAK) 2007	38	KOR: 24,585

== Release history ==
Country	Date	Distributing label	Format
South Korea	5 December 2007	Good EMG, Vitamin Entertainment	CD (VDCD-6047)
