= Winter Story 2006–2007 =

Winter Story 2006-2007
- Winter Story 2006-2007 cover

EP by Shinhwa
- Released: 25 January 2007
- Recorded: 2007
- Genre: K-pop, Dance
- Language: Korean
- Label: Good Entertainment

Shinhwa chronology
Inspiration #1 (2006)	Winter Story 2006-2007 (2007)	Winter Story 2007 (2007)

Winter Story 2006–2007 is the third Winter Story album of South Korean boy band Shinhwa. It was released on 25 January 2007 by Good Entertainment. Shinhwa did not release a Winter Story for 2005-2006. They released two different kinds of Winter Story 2006-2007, one containing 2 disc with the other containing 2 discs and a DVD.

== Tracks ==
Information is adapted from the liner notes of Winter Story 2006–2007:

No.	Title	Lyrics	Music	Arrangement	Length
1.	"Girls Exclusive" (Korean Lyrics Version)	Brian Kim, Eric Mun	Deckstream, Lauren	Deckstream, Lauren	3:15
2.	"예쁘잖아" (Isn't It Beautiful)	Lyn, Eric Mun, Sam(3)	Han Sang-won	Han Sang-won	3:33
3.	"The Days"	Yoon Ji-woong, Hong Chang-seok, Eric Mun, Sam(3)	Yoon Ji-woong	Jang Joon-ho	4:41
4.	"The Days" (Instrumental Version)	N/A	Yoon Ji-woong	Jang Joon-ho	4:41

== Chart performance ==
Edition	Chart	Peak position	Sales
2CD	Korea Monthly Albums (RIAK) January 2007	5	KOR: 23,309
2CD	Korea Yearly Albums (RIAK) 2007	38	KOR: 23,309
2CD+DVD	Korea Monthly Albums (RIAK) January 2007	2	KOR: 20,654
2CD+DVD	Korea Yearly Albums (RIAK) 2007	45	KOR: 20,654

== Release history ==
Country	Date	Distributing label	Format
South Korea	25 January 2007	Good EMG, Vitamin Entertainment	CD (VDCD-6014)
South Korea	25 January 2007	Good EMG, Vitamin Entertainment	2CD+DVD (VDCD-6013)

== Personnel ==
Information is adapted from the liner notes of Winter Story 2006–2007:

- Park Kwon-young - producer
- Park Hyeok - sound engineer
- Jeon Hoon - mastering engineer
- Lee Seong-yeol - guitar ("Isn't It Beautiful", "The Days")
- Gil Eun-kyeong - piano ("The Days")
- Jang Joon-ho - piano ("The Days")
- Kang Soo-ho - drums ("The Days")
- The Strings - strings ("Isn't It Beautiful")
- K Strings - strings ("The Days")
