= Yu-bin =

- Hangul: 유빈
- RR: Yubin
- MR: Yubin

Yu-bin, also spelled Yoo-bin, is a Korean given name.

== People ==
People with this name include:

- Kim Yu-bin (musician) (born 1988), South Korean female singer, former member of girl group Wonder Girls
- Dami (born Lee Yu-bin, 1997), South Korean singer, member of girl group Dreamcatcher
- Song Yuvin (born Song Yu-bin, 1998), South Korean male singer, former member of boy bands Myteen and B.O.Y
- Lee Yu-bin (born 2001), South Korean female short track speed skater
- Shin Yu-bin (born 2004), South Korean table tennis player
- Kim Yoo-bin (actress) (born 2005), South Korean actress
- Gong Yu-bin (born 2005), South Korean singer, and main dancer of girl group TripleS

== See also ==
- List of Korean given names
