= The Return (Shinhwa album) =

Studio album by Shinhwa
- Released: 23 March 2012
- Recorded: 2011–2012
- Genres: K-pop, electropop, dance
- Length: 37:23
- Language: Korean
- Labels: Shinhwa Co., CJ E&M Music and Live, Universal Music Group
- Producer: Shinhwa Company

Shinhwa chronology
Volume 9 (2008)	The Return (2012)	The Classic (2013)

Alternative cover
- The Return (Thanks Edition) cover

Singles from The Return
- 1. "Venus" Released: 23 March 2012

The Return is the tenth studio album of South Korean boy band Shinhwa, in commemoration of their 14th anniversary. It was released on 23 March 2012 by Shinhwa Company and distributed by CJ E&M Music. It marked the group's comeback to the music industry after a four-year hiatus, since the release of Volume 9 in 2008, as the band members served individual mandatory military services.

It was first released as a limited edition and followed by a Thanks Edition on 11 April. Commercially, the album sold a cumulative total of 88,059 copies as of August 2013. In support of the album, the group embarked on their Grand Tour: The Return with shows across Asia.

== Background ==
The album was first released as a limited edition of 30,000 copies in a hard case with an A4 size 80-page photobook. Shinhwa Company announced on 2 April that a Thanks Edition will be released with pre-order available from the same day. The new edition is designed by graphic artist Ikama; who has previously worked with Shinhwa, Shin Hye-sung and Lee Min-woo on their solo projects.

It is re-packaged in a white box with a new and different logo design of the group on the cover, plus a 70-page photobook. However the release was delayed from 6 to 11 April in order to meet demand. The album was released in Taiwan on 27 April 2012 by Universal Music Taiwan with a bonus DVD containing the music video of lead track "Venus".

== Release ==
The album features electropop lead track "Venus", produced by Gandalf and written by Andrew Jackson, Gandalf Roudette-Muschamp and Joshua Thompson. The lyrics was written by Shinhwa member Lee Min-woo, credited as 'M', about a man’s revelation towards a woman. On 19 March 2012, the teaser for the music video was released, showing individual member black-and-white footage searching for their 'Venus'. It was directed by Kim Kwang-suk, the CF director behind Samsung Ultra Laptop and Nikon Camera adverts, with a modern vampire theme and high intensity choreography. It took three days to shoot and cost over ₩200 million with six different large-scale custom-made sets.

The full MV was released on 28 March 2012 on Shinhwa official YouTube channel. On 10 April a dance version of it was also released. On 19 July 2012 two further music videos were released, "Be My Love" and "Breathin'", which features behind-the-scene comeback footage, concert and overseas clips.

== Composition ==
Other contributions by Shinhwa members included lyrics for "Hurts" and "Move With Me" by Eric; lyrics and composition for "Red Carpet" and "Stay" by Lee Min-woo, who also wrote the lyrics "Be My Love". As well as lyrics for "Let It Go" by Shin Hye-sung.

"On the Road" is a Britpop track with heavy acoustic rhythm. It talks about the sacrifices members made while awaiting their return, the gratefulness they have for their fans, as well as reflections on the long journey they have traveled on and new ones together in the future. "Hurts", an eight-beat pop track, is the album's lead ballad track, with vocals directed by Eric. It was a remake of Frankie J's song with a new rap style by Eric. "Red Carpet" with a thick beat and synth vocals, is another electropop dance track, co-produced by Lee Min-woo and producer Kim Do-hyun. "Move with Me", a hip hop style track that showcases Eric’s rap-writing skills and individual members' rhythmical vocals.

"Let It Go" is a special song gifted by Aziatix member Eddie Shin and Jung Jae-yoon of 1990s group, Solid. It features a simple R&B style beat and an oriental riff, with a prominent rock-feel electric guitar chorus. The lyrics is about a man knowing that he has to move on but still misses the woman who left him. "Stay" aims to highlight the different colours of each members, has a cheerful rhythm and exciting melody. "Welcome", a solid and powerful track, with a fresh and vigorous sound. "Be My Love", with slick grooves, a sweet melody, disco bass guitar and strings, encompasses the soul, funk and disco feel of the 1960s and 1970s. "Re-Love", an urban R&B ballad, has a powerful synthesizer sound and hip hop beat to a slow tempo, with heavy vocal harmonization. It talks about forgetting the pain and hardships of life thus far and to start anew together, from the perspective of an individual to his lover. "Breathin’", an electropop track, that features a modern and mysterious groove with a dream-like feel.

== Commercial performance ==
On the day of release "Venus" took first place on various online music charts, including Mnet, Bugs Music, Olleh Music, MelOn, Soribada, Naver Music and Daum Music. The album debut at number three on Gaon Album Chart for the week of 18 to 24 March 2012, and was number 5 on Gaon Monthly Album Chart for March with 32,500 copies sold. As of the end of 2012, the album has sold a cumulative total of 83,058 copies.

== Music video and promotion ==
On 14 March 2012, stills from the MV for "Venus" were released, showing members in individual and group dance shots dressed in all black outfits. On 20 March, individual teaser photos of Eric and Kim Dong-wan were released, showing a modern vampire theme. This was followed by photos of Jun Jin and Lee Min-woo on 21 March, and the final photos of Andy and Shin Hye-sung the following day, as well as two behind-the-scene MV making-of videos.

On 25 March, during the encore performance of Grand Tour: The Return, Shin Hye-sung dislocated his right knee when he was shot up on stage and did not land properly. He was rushed to the emergency room before the end of the concert, with him requiring surgery and six months of rest. However, he postponed the surgery until the promotions for the album concluded, although he continued to receive treatment. Hence, they performed "Hurt" singing in chairs and with a substitute dancer for "Venus", for their comeback on 29 March on M Countdown. This also mark their first televised comeback performance in four years. "Venus" won one first place music program award on M Countdown on 19 April 2012.

== Track listing ==
The Return track listing
No.	Title	Lyrics	Music	Length
1.	"On the Road"	Kim Eana	Kim Do-hyun	4:10
2.	"Hurts"	Eric	Eddie Galan, Emile Ghantous, Alex Niceforo, Francisco Bautista	4:13
3.	"Venus"	M	Andrew Jackson, Joshua Thompson, Gandalf Roudette-Muschamp	3:39
4.	"Red Carpet"	Brian Kim, M	Kim Do-hyun, M	3:39
5.	"Move with Me"	Eric	Gregg Pagani	3:20
6.	"Let It Go"	Eddie Shin, Shin Hye-sung	Jae Chong, Eddie Shin	3:44
7.	"Stay"	M, Melody9	M, Melody9	3:19
8.	"Welcome"	Kim Eana	Yoon Il-sang	3:34
9.	"Be My Love"	M	Seo Jae-ha, Lee Yoo-jin	3:11
10.	"Re-Love"	Lee Sang-in	Lee Sang-in	4:21
11.	"Breathin'"	Kim Jin	Kim Jin	4:47
Total length:				37:23

== Charts ==
=== Album charts ===
Chart	Peak position	Sales
Korea Weekly Albums (Gaon)	3	KOR: 88,059
Korea Monthly Albums (Gaon)	5	KOR: 88,059
Korea Yearly Albums (Gaon)	17	KOR: 88,059
Taiwan Weekly East Asia Albums (G-Music)	2	

== Release history ==
Country	Date	Distributing label	Format
South Korea	23 March 2012	Shinhwa Company, CJ E&M Music	Digital download Limited Edition (CD) (CMCC-9891)
South Korea	11 April 2012	Shinhwa Company, CJ E&M Music	Thanks Edition (CD) (CMCC-9910)
Taiwan	27 April 2012	Universal Music Group	Taiwan Special Edition (CD+DVD)
