= Lee Min-woo =

South Korean singer (born 1979)

- 이민우
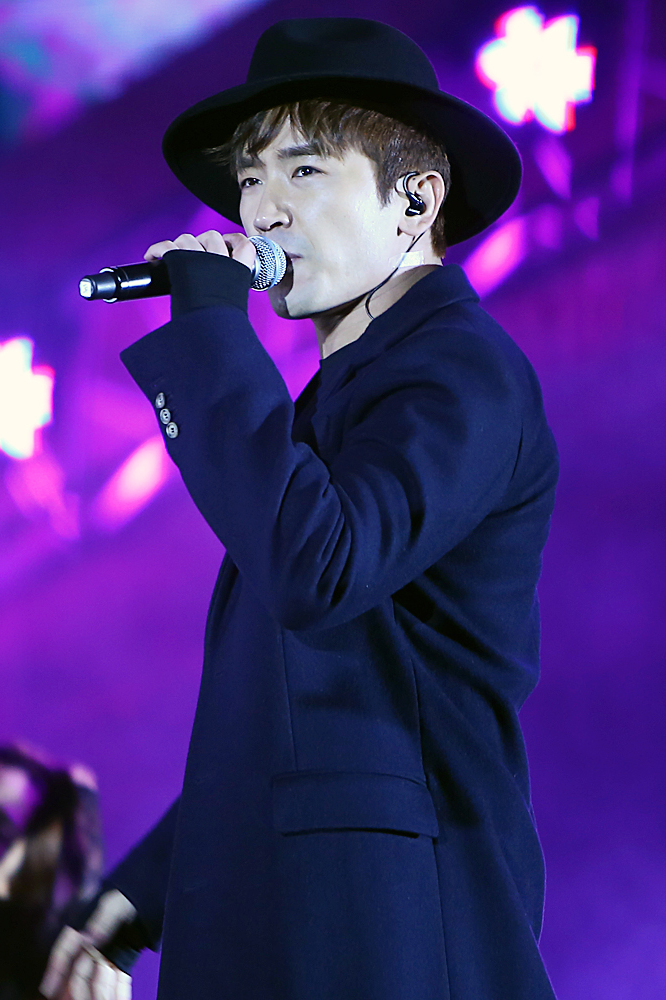
- Lee in 2014
- Born: September 19, 1979 (age 47); Jeonju, North Jeolla, South Korea
- Other name: M
- Occupations: Singer; actor; entrepreneur
- Spouse: Lee A-mi (m. 2025)
- Children: 1
- Musical career
- Genres: K-pop; J-pop; Dance
- Years active: 1998–present
- Labels: SM; Good; M Rising; Shinhwa Company; Liveworks Company; LeanBranding
- Member of: Shinhwa
- Website: Mstyle79; Leanbranding; Shinhwa Company

Korean name
- Hangul: 이민우
- Hanja: 李玟雨
- RR: I Minu
- MR: I Minu

Lee Min-woo (Korean: 이민우; born September 19, 1979), also known by the stage name M, is a South Korean entertainer and singer. He is best known as a member of the South Korean boy band Shinhwa. Lee was the first Shinhwa member to debut as a solo artist in 2003, and has since released three studio albums.

In 2007, Lee set up his own agency, M Rising Entertainment, to manage his solo activities. He and the other members founded the Shinhwa Company to manage their group activities and became co-CEO with leader Eric Mun. As of November 2012, he has signed with Liveworks Company.

== Career ==
=== Debut with Shinhwa ===
While dancing for his group, Dicky Ducky, as a student at Jeonju Fine Arts School for the Everland dancing competition, Lee was scouted and was the fourth member to join the boy band Shinhwa. Although he started out as a rapper and a singer, he stopped rapping as Shinhwa continued to release albums. As a skilled dancer, he has choreographed some of Shinhwa's dances.

=== Solo debut in 2003 ===
During the transition from SM Entertainment to Good Entertainment, Lee debut as solo artist in November 2003, under the stage name of "M", being the first Shinhwa member to do so, as well as the first idol to do solo while still being in a group. His first album, Un-Touch-Able, according to the January 2004 chart sold in excess of 100,000 copies, Two lead tracks were released for promotion: "Just One Night", the lead track from the album is a jazzy slow groove song and "Oh Rain". Then in 2004, Lee reunited with Shinhwa to work on their first album with Good Entertainment, Brand New, released in August 2004.

During this time, Lee recorded and released a single, "If You...", in March 2005. Sales did not reach album levels, but the single managed to sell over 30,000 copies. Again, Lee heavily promoted the single, with many performances of the song "If You...", complete with special dance intros performances of other songs. As opposed to the sophisticated image from his first album, Lee promoted this single with a "handsome" image, as the song was a light pop song. However, when fellow Shinhwa member Shin Hye-sung released his solo debut, Lee stopped performing in order to avoid competing with him.

In October 2005, Lee released his second solo album, IInd Winds. Initially released in two versions (including a limited "Lineage II" edition), the album's liner notes showed off a sexier Lee Min-woo, as his new muscular body was clearly displayed; there were many pictures of him in partial attire. Lee used the sexier image for his lead single "Bump!!!", which was a club-oriented dance hit. Complete with an intense video and heavily choreographed performances, the song pushed Lee to the top of the various network charts, and his album sold 80 000 copies in the month of September. To capitalize on this success, Good Entertainment (via EMI Korea, their distributor) released yet another version of the album. However, this one had a completely new cover and special bonus tracks; in addition, there was a bonus VCD. This "Girl Friend edition" was released as Lee moved onto his second single, "Girl Friend", a ballad about a lost love. Lee changed his image once again, displaying a rougher, yet sensitive, image. "Girl Friend" was fairly successful as well, allowing Lee to promote his album for over four months, a rarity in Korea's music industry. The album was ultimately a strong seller, placing 12th in MIAK's year-end charts with over 120,000 copies sold.

=== 2006–2007: M Rising Entertainment and acting ===
Lee kicked off 2006 with his first solo concert, M's Girl Friend, on January 14 and 15 at 88 Gymnasium in Hwagok-dong, where he performed his solo hits as well as cover versions of "Tonight" and "Cover Girl" by New Kids on the Block. The concert was released on DVD in the summer. Lee debut as an actor in Wontak's Angel, released in summer of 2006. For the remainder of the year, he rejoined Shinhwa for the released of their 8th album State of the Art, and the associated promotion along with Shinhwa 2006 Asia Tour: State of the Art concerts. He resumed his solo career at the end of 2006, with a promotional concert at Seoul Melon AX on December 2, followed by another concert in Shanghai on December 4. His end of year activity was participation in new singer Sat's first single, released on December 12.

In 2007, Lee set up his own agency, M Rising Entertainment, to manage his solo career whilst he continued to perform as part of Shinhwa under Good Entertainment. In January 2007, Lee took part in the Hallyu Festival in Osaka which also featured bandmate Jun Jin, Kangta of H.O.T, SG Wannabe and actor Song Seung-heon at the Osaka Dome.

Lee performed at American singer Christina Aguilera's Seoul concert on June 24 as part of her Back to Basics Tour. Aguilera reportedly viewed video clips sent in by Korean artists, as she wanted to choose the best. The artists were viewed for their dancing and singing abilities, as well as album sales. Ivy performed as the opening act for the first concert on June 23, while Lee performed on the second day.

In mid-July 2007, Lee release his third album Explore, which was in the R&B/dance style of his previous albums. He had composed nine songs and the album debuted at number three on the chart. Although he intended to release it in the U.S., via CJ Music and CJ Entertainment's global network, it was released in Korea instead.

=== 2008–2011: Mini album and military service ===
Lee's third album M Rizing, sold over 30,000 copies in 2008. Lee's first single from the album was call Stomp, where it was number onefor two consecutive days on an online chart. His second single, "The M Style" was also quite popular as well, climbing up the charts just as quickly. Though his songs managed to chart well, the album sales were not as strong as its two predecessors, with the album dropping off the Korean Monthly Chart rather quickly. Lee released his first mini-album, The Sentimental Reason in February 2008 to coincide with Valentine's Day and White Day. Giving only a limited 13,000 copies, it sold out in less than a month. The mini-album was successful enough for Lee to promote it with two singles, "Just One More Night" and "Believe In Love".

In June 2009, Lee made a comeback with mini album, Minnovation. He collaborated with American producer Outsidaz on title track, "Minnovation", which is infused with electronica and hip hop beats. In January 2010, it was reported that Lee was in a serious car accident on Christmas Eve, in which he sustained some serious injuries. He then held M′s Suite Room concert in February.

On February 25, 2010, Lee enlisted for 24 months of mandatory military service, the last Shinhwa members to do so. He completed four weeks of basic training followed by non-active duty as a public service officer at Seoul Station. He was discharged on March 2, 2012.

=== Shinhwa Company ===
On July 1, 2011, Lee became co-CEO, along with Eric Mun, of Shinhwa Company, a joint venture agency for Shinhwa to perform as a group. The Company manages the group as a whole, whilst members' individual activities are managed by their respective agencies. Shinhwa then made their comeback in March 2012, after a four-year hiatus. The group released their tenth studio album The Return on March 23, 2011, launched their comeback concerts 2012 Shinhwa Grand Tour: The Return throughout Asia and their first exclusive variety program Shinhwa Broadcast premiered on March 17, 2012, on cable channel JTBC.

In August 2012, Lee served on the judging panel of a Chinese singing-survival show Asian Wave, which was broadcast on Dragon Television from September 5. In September, Lee along with bandmate Shin Hye-sung performed at the West Bank Music Festival in Shanghai from September 30 to October 2, as K-Pop representatives, along with other international as such as Michael Bolton, in front of an audience of 100,000 people.

In November 2012, he signed a management agency contract with Liveworks Company, who also manage bandmates Shin Hye-sung and Kim Dong-wan. Liveworks is to manage his solo activities including album, concert and in partnership on producing songs and developing new talents. Lee held his M Original Christmas Live concert on December 23 and 24, 2012. The 4,000 tickets were sold out in two minutes when they went on sale on November 2.

On May 16, 2013, Shinhwa released their eleventh studio album. The song was well liked and appreciated for its innovative "Vogue" dancing. Four of the songs; "That's Right" (그래; Geurae)", "New Me", "Hurricane" and "I Gave You" was written by Lee-Minwoo. He also joined Mnet′s dance survival show Dancing 9 as one of 'masters' for the team 'Red Wings'. The show also stars Girls' Generation's Hyoyeon and Yuri as 'masters' for the opposing team 'Blue Eye'.

In January 2014, it was announced that Lee would be releasing a new mini album, in honor of his 10th anniversary as a solo artist. The album would be entitled "M+TEN" and would consist of 5 new tracks. The lead single was entitled "Taxi". Stills from the music video were released and his management team added of the song, "Minwoo did his best to prepare the many songs for his 10th solo anniversary album with special affection by directly selecting and recording the songs. Not only does 'Taxi', which tells of an episode that takes place in a taxi, have an addicting chorus but special performances and more have also been prepared for the song."

In September 2022, Lee held the first fan meeting M's Record Shop' in three years since 2019, and was held on the 24th and 25th.

== Personal life ==
On July 25, 2025, Lee announced his upcoming marriage to Ami Aoyama, a third-generation Korean-Japanese fashion model and television personality. He is stepfather to her daughter (born 2019) from her previous marriage. Their daughter was born on December 8, 2025.

== Discography ==
- Un-Touch-Able (2003)
- IInd Winds (2005)
- Explore M (2007)
- M Rizing (2008)

== Filmography ==
=== Film and television series ===
Year	Title	Notes
2000	Haeng Jin	Sitcom
2005	Nonstop 5	Sitcom
2006	WonTak's Angel	Film – aka Holy Daddy

=== Reality and variety shows ===
Year	Title	Role	Notes
2013–2015	Dancing 9	Main Cast	as one of the "masters" for 'Red Wings' (Season 1–3)
2014	Law of the Jungle in Brazil	Cast member	Part of first-half relay survival tribe (Episode 108–112).
2016	King of Mask Singer	Contestant	as Sanchoman of Passion Carbonara (Episode 53–54)
2016	Celebrity Bromance	Cast member with Jungkook	(Season 8, Episode 35–39)
2017	One Night Food Trip: Mukbang Race	Main Cast	with Andy Lee; Episode 27–30
2018	4 Wheeled Restaurant (Season 1)	Main Cast	Premiered on March 27, 2018, and ended on May 15, 2018.
2018	Seoul Mate Season 1	Cast member	with Andy Lee; Episode 26
2018	Law of the Jungle in Sabah	Cast member	Part of second-half survival tribe with Eric Mun and Andy Lee; Episode 325–333).
2019	4 Wheeled Restaurant (Season 3)	Main Cast	Episode 7–12
2023	2023 Seoul Music Festival	Cast member	Attractive Stage Ending Stage
2023	Best Friend Tocumentary Dining Table for 4	Main Cast	with Jun Jin; Episode 6

== Concerts ==
Date		Title	Place
2005	Sep	M Showcase: for 2nd album	
2006	Jan 14, 15	M's Girl Friend: first live concert	88 Gymnasium, Seoul
2006	Oct 27	Seoul Music Festival	Sangam World Cup Stadium, Seoul
2006	Dec 2, 3	M Live Work's Concert	AX-Korea, Seoul
2007	Mar 28	M Live Work's Concert	Osaka, Japan
2007	Apr 1	M Live Work's Concert	Tokyo, Japan
2007	Aug 25, 26	M Explore Concert	AX-Korea, Seoul
2007	Dec 23, 24	M Style: "HEY! Get Wild! Dance! Scream!"	Club, Seoul
2008	Jan 10, 11	Explore M Style Japan Live in Tokyo	Tokyo, Japan
2008	Feb 16, 17	Wolf M	서강대학교 메리홀
2008	May 30, 31	Back to 'M' Concert in Seoul	
2008	Sep 25	M RIZING Tour	CLUB ANSWER, Seoul
2008	Dec 17,18	M RIZING Tour	Tokyo, Japan
2008	Dec 31	M RIZING Tour	Yonsei Univ auditorium, Seoul
2009	Aug 16	M Live in Seoul - Minnovation	Olympic Park Olympic Hall, Seoul
2009	Oct 15 ~ 25	M's Romantic House Acoustic & Unplugged	Chungmu Arts Hall
2010	Feb	M′s Suite Room concert	
2012	Dec 23, 24	M Original Christmas Live Concert	Yonsei Univ auditorium, Seoul
2013	Dec 24, 25	Christmas Live - XMAS	AX-Korea, Seoul
2014	May 24, 25	2014 M+TEN TOUR IN SEOUL [M STEP]	Olympic Park Olympic Hall, Seoul
2015	Dec 24 ~ 26	ON THE RECORD & OFF THE RECORD	AX-Korea, Seoul
2017	Jul 28	2017 LEE MIN WOO FAN PARTY <SUMMER TONIGHT>	Yonsei Univ auditorium, Seoul
2018	Dec 22 ~ 24	2018 LEE MIN WOO CHRISTMAS CONCERT MERRY M	Yes24 Live Hall, Seoul
2019	Jul 2	FAN MEETING 〈HAPPY M〉	연세대학교 백주년기념관 콘서트홀
2022	Jul 2	FAN MEETING NFT Holder's ONLINE	ONLINE
2022	Sep 24, 25	FAN MEETING M's Record Shop	성신여대 운정그린캠퍼스 대강장
2023	Jun 23 ~ Jul 2	M 20th Anniversary Live "STORY"	Shinhan Play Square Live Hall, Seoul
2023	Sep 23	SEOUL MUSIC FESTIVAL	Noddles Island Lawns, Seoul
2023	Nov 10 ~ 12	1st FANCAMP "M SCHOOL"	KYOWON TRAINING INSTITUTE, Ga-Pyeong, Gyeong-Gi
2024	Jul 27 ~ 28	2024 LEE MIN WOO FAN CON 'Original Intention'	Musinsa Garage
2024	Nov 15 ~ 17	2024 LEE MIN WOO 2nd FAN CAMP [YO! M SCHOOL]	Phoenix Snow Park, Pyeongchang

== Awards and nominations ==
Years	Awards
2004	Buzz Award; MTV Music Award Japan "Best Buzz In Asia"
2005	Golden Disk award; Mnet Asian Music Awards – Best Dance Performance; SBS Music award
2006	Channel V Thailand: Best Asian Artist; DongNam Hottrack music award (China); The most favourite Asia artist chosen by the China citizen "Asia Star Family Love Concert Shanghai"
2007	Netizen August MVP artists (3rd Place); Viewer's Choice Award; MKMF 2007 Award: Best Dance Performance (nominated)
