= Eric Mun =

South Korean rapper (born 1979)

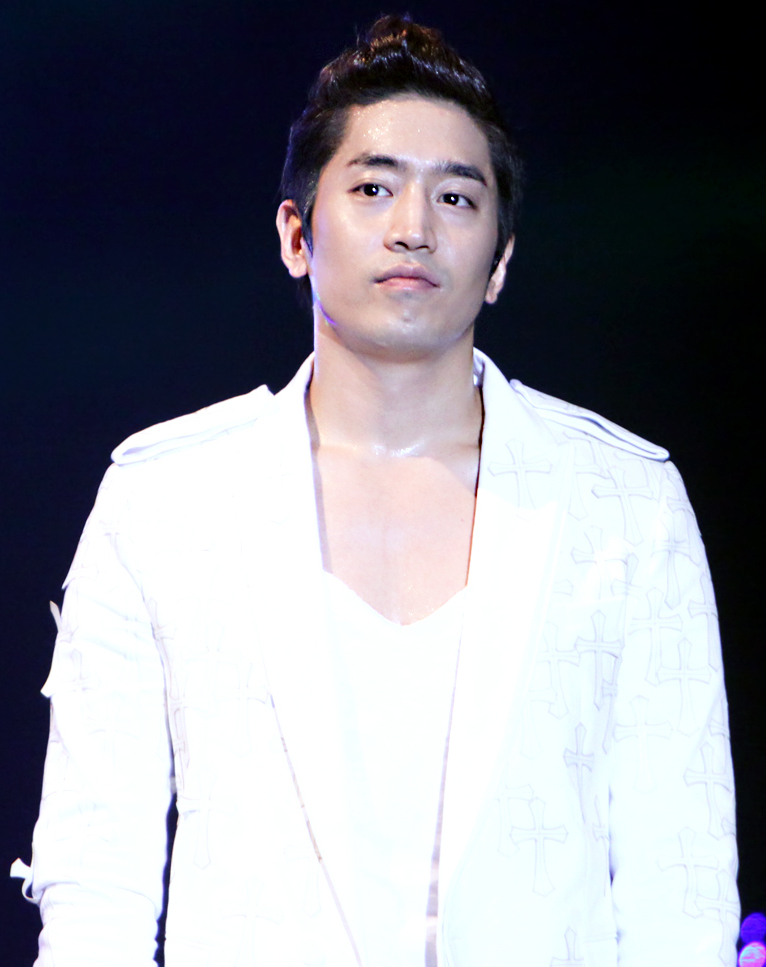
- Mun in August 2012
- Born: Mun Jung-hyuk; February 16, 1979 (age 47); Seoul, South Korea
- Education: Sunny Hills High School; Dongguk University
- Spouse: Na Hye-mi (m. 2017)
- Children: 2
- Musical career
- Genres: K-pop; hip hop; dance
- Occupations: Rapper; songwriter; actor; record producer
- Instruments: Vocals; saxophone
- Years active: 1998–present
- Labels: Shinhwa Company; TOP Media
- Website: shinhwacompany.co.kr

Korean name
- Hangul: 문정혁
- RR: Mun Jeonghyeok
- MR: Mun Chŏnghyŏk

Eric Mun (born February 16, 1979), birth name Mun Jung-hyuk (Korean: 문정혁, is a South Korean rapper, songwriter and actor. He is a member and leader of the South Korean boy band Shinhwa. He is also well known for several dramas such as Phoenix (2004), Super Rookie (2005), and Another Oh Hae-young (2016). He was with Top Class Entertainment from 2007 to December 2013. In 2014, Mun and his manager of 10 years, Lee Jong-hyun, set up a new management agency, E&J Entertainment, for his individual activities. Mun is also the CEO of Shinhwa Company, the home agency of his group, with Lee Min-woo as co-CEO since 2011, and with the remaining members—Kim Dong-wan, Shin Hye-sung, Jun Jin and Andy Lee—as shareholders.

== Early life ==
Mun was born in Daechi-dong, Gangnam District, Seoul, South Korea. He is the youngest of the three siblings with two older sisters. He attended Daechi Elementary School located in Seoul. When his family moved to the U.S., he went to John Burroughs Middle School located in Los Angeles. Mun spent his years at Parks Junior High School and Sunny Hills High School, both of which are located in Fullerton, California. In 1996, he returned to Korea and joined SM Entertainment as a trainee and was featured as a rapper on label mate girl group S.E.S.' single "I'm Your Girl" along with Andy. On March 24, 1998, with the stage name Eric, he debuted as leader and main rapper of group Shinhwa with their single "해결사" (The Solver) on KM Music Tank. He stated that their debut album, Resolver, did not perform well and the band almost disbanded. At the time, he thought seriously about giving up and returning to the U.S.

In 2005, Mun graduated from Dongguk University with a major in Theater and Film.

== Career ==
=== 2004: Acting career beginnings ===
In 2002, Mun and his Shinhwa bandmates had cameo appearance in the movie Emergency 19 Act. In 2003 director Park Sung-soo cast him in a supporting role for MBC's series Breathless (I Run). In early 2004, he appeared in the drama Phoenix (Bulsae).

=== 2005–2006: Injury ===
In 2005, Mun starred in lead role in MBC's Super Rookie with actress Han Ga-in. It was also broadcast on Fuji Television. It got solid rating in Korea during the broadcast. Super Rookie was also a big hit in Japan after Fuji TV paid ₩2 billion for the broadcast rights in Japan. It was commercially successful in Japan when it was broadcast there. In December 2005, Mun went to promote Super Rookie in Japan, where he was greeted at the airport by a large crowd.

In early 2006, Mun was injured on the set of MBC drama Wolf, resulting in it being pulled off air after four episodes. Mun was injured whilst shooting a scene, near Namdaemun in Seoul, where he was to save co-star Han Ji-min from being run over by a car. The stunt car driver, misunderstanding the instructions given to him, drove at them at 40 km/h and did not stop in front of them as planned.

In August, after the successful run of Super Rookie, especially in Japan, Mun collaborated again with its writers in Invincible Parachute Agent (also known as Korea Secret Agency).

=== 2008–2010: Military enlistment ===
Shinhwa's 10th Anniversary concert in March 2008 marked the start of Shinhwa's hiatus as a group to fulfill mandatory military service. Before his army enlistment, Mun appeared in a period drama for the first time in his acting career with Strongest Chil Woo. With 30 million wons per episode for Strongest Chil Woo, Mun was the highest paid singer-turned-actor in the industry at the time.

Mun gave up his U.S. citizenship in 2003, to be able to serve his military service. He was the first Shinhwa member to enlist for mandatory military service in October 2008. Because of his back injury from the filming of Wolf, Mun served non-active duty after undergoing four weeks of basic training. He was discharged on October 30, 2010.

=== 2011: Shinhwa Company ===
After being discharged, Mun's first project was supposed to be KBS' action drama Poseidon opposite Kim Ok-vin, set for broadcast in July 2011. However they dropped out when production was halted after the Bombardment of Yeonpyeong incident in November 2010. Instead, he appeared in another KBS drama, Spy Myung-wol with Han Ye-seul in July, playing a Korean wave star who is at the center of a kidnap plot by North Korean agents.

On July 1, 2011, Mun became CEO (with Lee Min-woo as co-CEO) of Shinhwa Company, a joint venture agency for members Shinhwa to perform as a group. The Company manages the group as a whole, whilst members' individual activities are managed by their respective agencies.

As part of Top Class Entertainment he produced girl group Stellar, who debuted in August 2011 with the song "Rocket Girl".

=== 2012: Shinhwa reunion ===
In March 2012, Mun reunited with his Shinhwa bandmates for their comeback after four years, under the management of Shinhwa Company. The group released their tenth studio album The Return on March 23, 2012, launched the concerts 2012 Shinhwa Grand Tour: The Return throughout Asia and their first exclusive variety program Shinhwa Broadcast premiered on March 17, 2012, on cable channel JTBC.

Mun's rap is featured on Brown Eyed Girls' Ga-in's digital single "Nostalgia", released on November 30, 2012.

=== 2013: Shinhwa tour and leaving Top Class Management ===
On February 8, 2013, Shinhwa's agency announced the group's 2013 Shinhwa Grand Tour: The Classic to commemorate the group's 15 years since their debut was revealed. The album's name called The Classic.

Mun along with Shinhwa won Mwave Global Star Awards as well as many music shows awards and a Triple Crown on M Countdown for their music comeback.

December 2013, Mun's contract with Top Class Entertainment came to an end. He did not re-sign another contract with Top Class Entertainment and no longer has any running of group Stellar whom he helped the management to produce and promote the original line up.

=== 2014: Return to acting ===
In March 2014, Mun successfully concluded the 16th Anniversary Concerts with Shinhwa. After several casting offers from KBS, Mun returned to television in August 2014 with the drama Discovery of Love, which reunites him with Jung Yu-mi, who was his co-star in MBC's 2007 Que Sera, Sera. It was also announced that he had formed his own management company, E&J Entertainment, with his manager of 10 years, Lee Jong-hyun.

Despite its average 7% Nielsen rating, Mun and the team of Discovery of Love received praise for their acting and Mun won a 'Triple Crown at KBS 2014 Year End Award (Excellent Actor, Best Couple, and Netizen Award). With this win, Mun had won acting awards at all three major Broadcasting Networks. In 2015, Discovery of Love was nominated for the 2015 Rockie Award in the Melodrama category alongside 30 Vies (Canada), EastEnders (UK), Grey's Anatomy (USA), My Sunshine (China), and Mysterious Summer (Japan). In a 2015 Instiz discussion post about viewers' favorite drama characters, Mun's Kang Tae-ha Discovery of Love stays in top 10 at #6.

=== 2016: "Another Oh Hae-young" and "Three Meals a Day" ===
After Shinhwa's 18 Anniversary in March, Mun returned to acting and appeared in the South Korean TV cable (tvN) drama Another Oh Hae-young with Seo Hyun-jin. The drama premiered on May 2 with better rating than its predecessor Pied Piper. It broke its projected rating of 5% of on its 6th episode and becomes tvN's all-time highest rated drama for their Monday - Tuesday time-slot with the rating of 9.9% for its final episode. Another Oh Hae-young team was rewarded a trip to Thailand after the drama ended. At tvN10 Awards on October 9, Mun was awarded the title of "Ro-co King". Seo Hyun-jin was also crowned "Ro-co Queen" for their roles in Another Oh Hae-Young.

On September 16, in a preview for the new season of tvN "Three Meals a Day", it showed Mun joined as a cast member for Season 3 of Three Meals A Day - Fishing Village 3 with Lee Seo-jin and Yoon Kyun-sang. This season of Fishing Village was filmed at Deukryang Island. The season premiere was on October 14. It was Mun's first appearance as a cast member of a variety show without Shinhwa. Mun surprised everyone with his great cooking skills that earned him the E-Chef title. The show had great rating of above 10% on average with the highest rating of 11.536% (AGB) 13% (TNmS).

At the end of November 2016, Mun and Shinhwa released a mini album Unchanging: Orange as part one of their 13th album.

Mun was chosen to be the model for Jean Michael Basquiat a new premium golf wears and accessories by CJ E&M and ULOS, a Men's cosmetics & skincare by Ostuka Korea.

=== 2017–2018: Marriage and Shinhwa's 20th Anniversary ===
Shinhwa followed up with a comeback in January 2017 with Unchanging: Touch as the second part of their 13th album. On March 24, Shinhwa released Shinhwa 18th, their first self-produced variety show through Naver's paid subscription platform for Vapp+.

Continue to be Jean Michael Basquiat and ULOS brand representative, Eric was also chosen to be the representative for Bibigo by CJ E&M, a global Korean food brand CJ Cheil Jedang. Later this year, together with Kim Sang-joong and Kim Myung-min Eric was chosen by Netmarble Games for their new CF, Lineage 2 Revolution, an online & mobile game. Netmmarble Game also released a web drama series featuring Kim Sang-joong, Kim Myung-min, and Eric for their big-scale mobile MMORPG Lineage2 Revolution. In the web drama, Eric played a rookie employee who was trying to survive the hierarchy in a corporate environment, meanwhile he was reigning as the King in Lineage2 Revolution game. However, it was revealed that Eric is an actual high ranking player of "Lineage2 Revolution" in real life.

In February 2017 Eric and actress Na Hye-mi confirmed their relationship after it was reported in the news. The couple got married on July 1, 2017, at Youngnak Church in Jung District, Seoul, South Korea after five years of dating.

In 2018 Eric and Shinhwa had the whole year to celebrate the group's 20th anniversary since debut with various activities starting with a remake music video "All Your Dream", followed by a special fan party on March 24 & 25. The group made a music comeback with a release of a new music video "Kiss Me Like That" in August, followed with a new mini album "Heart". They also met their fans through various fan events as well as appearances on variety shows. Shinhwa wrapped up their year-long anniversary celebration with a 2-day concert at Olympic Gymnastics Arena (KSPO Dome) on October 6 and 7, followed by a concert at Taipei Arena on October 13 and Hong Kong Asia World Expo Hall on November 24.

=== 2019–2020: New management, solo activities and return to acting ===
On January 1, 2019, it was announced that Eric has joined his bandmate Andy at TOP Media. To everyone's surprise, Eric creates his own YouTube channel aguTV to share a various contents, from cooking, outings to how he failed to get a ticket for his own fan meeting.

His first broadcast activity for 2019 was a cast member for season 3 of tvN's variety show "Will The Locals Eat It?" in America (also known as 4 Wheeled Restaurant). The show premiered on April 18.

Eric and Shinhwa held their 21st anniversary concert, 'Chapter 4' at KSPO Dome on April 20 and 21, 2019.

On May 22, Mun was cast for MBC's new variety show, "The Barber of Seville". The filming took place in Seville, Spain and broadcast every Thursday from July 11 – Sep.12th.

Eric was also expected to make a come back to drama this year. It was reported that Eric and Go Joon-hee are in talk to join KBS's fantasy rom-com drama "Perfume" but he declined the offer. On November 5, Eric was confirmed as lead actor for Channel A's drama, "Yoobyeolna! Chef Moon" with Go Won-hee as lead actress. The drama is expected to be broadcast in March 2020.

On April 1, 2020, it was reported that Eric and Yoo In-na are reviewing offers to star in MBC's rom-com drama 'The Spy Who Loved Me'. About 2 months later, on June 22, Eric was confirmed as lead actor for MBC's rom-com drama 'The Spy Who Loved Me' together with Yoo In-na and Lim Ju-hwan. The drama is scheduled to premiere sometime in October 2020.

=== 2022: End of a contract with the same agency ===
In October 2022, Eric terminates his contract with TOP Media.

== Personal life ==
=== Marriage and family ===
In 2014, it was first reported that Eric had been dating actress and model Na Hye-mi but did not confirm their relationship. It was not until February 2017 when they publicly confirmed it through their respective agencies. After five years of dating, Mun and Na got married on July 1, 2017, in a private church ceremony with family and friends at Youngnak Presbyterian Church in Jung District, Seoul.

On August 23, 2022, Eric's agency announced that Na was pregnant with the couple's first child, after five years of marriage. She gave birth to a son on March 1, 2023. On January 6, 2025, Na's second pregnancy was announced. Their second son was born on March 19, 2025.

== Filmography ==
=== Television series ===
Year	Title	Role
2003	Breathless	Shin Sang-sik
2004	Phoenix	Seo Jung-min
2004	Banjun Drama	(ep.1-10)
2005	Super Rookie	Kang Ho
2006	Wolf	Bae Dae-chul
2006	Invincible Parachute Agent	Choi Kang
2007	Que Sera Sera	Kang Tae-joo
2008	Strongest Chil-Woo	Chil-woo
2011	Spy Myung-Wol	Kang Woo
2014	Discovery of Love	Kang Tae-ha
2016	Another Miss Oh	Park Do-kyung
2018	Tale of Fairy	Alex the Frog (voice cameo)
2020	Eccentric! Chef Moon	Kim Seung-mo
2020	The Spies Who Loved Me	Jun Ji-hoon

=== Film ===
Year	Title	Role
2002	Emergency Act 19	himself (cameo)
2005	A Bittersweet Life	Tae-goo
2005	Diary of June	Kim Dong-wook

=== Variety show ===
Year	Title	Notes
2016	Three Meals a Day - Fishing Village 3	Cast member
2017	Three Meals a Day - Sea Ranch	Cast member
2018	The Fishermen and The City	Guest
2018	Law of the Jungle - Sabah	Cast member
2018	2 Days & 1 Night	Guest with Shinhwa
2019	4 Wheeled Restaurant - America	Cast member
2019	The Barber of Seville	Cast member

== Awards and nominations ==
Year	Award	Category	Nominated work	Result
2004	23rd MBC Drama Awards	Best New Actor	Phoenix, Breathless	Won
2004	23rd MBC Drama Awards	Popularity Award, Actor	Phoenix, Breathless	Won
2005	41st Paeksang Arts Awards	Best New Actor (TV)	Super Rookie	Won
2005	41st Paeksang Arts Awards	Most Popular Actor (TV)	Super Rookie	Won
2005	24th MBC Drama Awards	Top Excellence Award, Actor	Super Rookie	Won
2005	24th MBC Drama Awards	Best Couple Award with Han Ga-in	Super Rookie	Nominated
2005	24th MBC Drama Awards	Popularity Award, Actor	Super Rookie	Nominated
2006	42nd Paeksang Arts Awards	Best New Actor (Film)	Diary of June	Nominated
2006	14th SBS Drama Awards	Excellence Award, Actor in a Miniseries	Invincible Parachute Agent	Won
2006	14th SBS Drama Awards	Top 10 Stars	Invincible Parachute Agent	Won
2014	28th KBS Drama Awards	Top Excellence Award, Actor	Discovery of Love	Nominated
2014	28th KBS Drama Awards	Excellence Award, Actor in a Miniseries	Discovery of Love	Won
2014	28th KBS Drama Awards	Best Couple Award with Jung Yu-Mi	Discovery of Love	Won
2014	28th KBS Drama Awards	Netizen Award, Actor	Discovery of Love	Won
2016	5th APAN Star Awards	Excellence Award, Actor in a Miniseries	Another Miss Oh	Nominated
2016	5th APAN Star Awards	Best Couple with Seo Hyun-jin	Another Miss Oh	Nominated
2016	tvN10 Awards	Best Actor	Another Miss Oh	Nominated
2016	tvN10 Awards	Romantic-Comedy King	Another Miss Oh	Won
2020	39th MBC Drama Awards	Top Excellence Award, Actor in a Wednesday-Thursday Miniseries	The Spies Who Loved Me	Nominated
2020	39th MBC Drama Awards	Best Couple Award with Yoo In-na	The Spies Who Loved Me	Nominated
