= List of Shinhwa Broadcast episodes =

Episodes of the South Korean programme

This is a list of episodes of Shinhwa Broadcast (Korean: 신화방송), a South Korean variety television programme, broadcast on general cable channel Joongang Tongyang Broadcasting Company (jTBC). The show is hosted by the six-member boy band Shinhwa: Eric Mun, Lee Min-woo, Kim Dong-wan, Shin Hye-sung, Jun Jin and Andy Lee.

It premiered on Saturday, 17 March 2012, at 22:00. On 13 October, the show was given a new timeslot and changed format, from episode 33 on 28 October, it aired on Sundays at 19:40, where member received Private Tutorials on various topics. For the month of March 2013, the show went on hiatus, and returned on 7 April with a new format of Mother's Touch cooking competition. The show, once again, went on hiatus after the 16 June broadcast and returned on 3 November 2013 with a new format for season two. As of 8 December 2013, 65 episodes in two seasons have been broadcast.

== Season one: Channels ==
Timeslot: Saturdays at 22:00/23:00

Episode #	Original broadcast date	Title	Notes	Ref
1	17 March 2012	SF Channel (1)	Superhero rescues President's daughter (1)	
1	Each member cosplay a superhero with Andy as James Bond, Dongwan as Superman, Eric as Six Million Dollar Man, Minwoo as Wonder Woman, Jun Jin as Invisible Man and Hyesung as Tarzan, in a series of mission to save the President's daughter.			
2	24 March 2012	SF Channel (2)	Superhero rescues President's daughter (2); Special appearance: Choi Hong-man	
2	Their quest to save the President's daughter continues, leading them onto the streets of Ilsan in Goyang, Gyeonggi Province. Their missions includes defeating mixed martial wrestler Choi Hong-man in hand-to-hand combat. At the completion of the mission all the Shinhwa members visited a public bathhouse for the first time in their 14-year career.			
3	31 March 2012	Sports Channel: Shinhwa Olympics	MC: Jang Dong-hyuk	
4	7 April 2012	Sports Channel: Shinhwa Olympics	MC: Jang Dong-hyuk	
4	In the two-part Shinhwa Olympics episode, members battle each other in unusual sports: office chair long jump, extreme funny faces, stripping judo, ink-hand fencing, gum archery etc.			
5	14 April 2012	Docu Channel: Star Life Theater special (1)		
5	Following the format of KBS Star Life Theater, members were tasked with filming themselves in their daily lives for the week, with a prize for the best footage, which resulted in a fierce battle between Eric and Hye-sung.			
6	21 April 2012	Docu Channel: Star Life Theater special (2)	Behind-the-scenes episode of 14th anniversary concert	
6	This episode followed the group as they prepare for their comeback 14th anniversary concert, with behind-the-scenes footage and interviews. Where they discussed the concert with backstage footage of Hye-sung's knee injury during the encore of the second concert.			
7	28 April 2012	Children Channel: Popularity Battle	MC: Jang Dong-hyuk	
8	5 May 2012	Children Channel: Popularity Battle	MC: Jang Dong-hyuk	
9	12 May 2012	Remake Channel: New Family Arcade (1)		
10	19 May 2012	Remake Channel: New Family Arcade (2) / Speech Channel: God of Eloquence (1)		
11	26 May 2012	Speech Channel: God of Eloquence (2)	Special appearance: Lee Hee-goo	
12	2 June 2012	Guest Channel: Shinhwa vs SHINee (1)		
13	9 June 2012	Guest Channel: Shinhwa vs SHINee (2)		
14	16 June 2012	Guest Channel: Shinhwa vs SHINee (3) / Travel Channel: God of MT (1)	MT=Membership Training. Operation Eric Hidden Camera (1)	
14	Shinhwa members goes on a roadtrip to Chuncheon. On the way tries they tried to prank Eric with a hidden camera, for the first time in 14 years. Members must complete a number of missions, however they are all fixed to make Eric lose, and receive punishments each time.			
15	23 June 2012	Travel Channel: God of MT (2)	Operation Eric Hidden Camera (2)	
15	Eric's hidden camera continues in an attempt by the members, to get back at him for all his pranks on them over the past 14 years. His punishment culminated in him walking in a market, don with a wig, sunglasses, tuxedo jacket on his upper-half and a skirt on his lower half.			
16	30 June 2012	Travel Channel: God of MT (3)	Shinhwa Sleepover	
16	During their first sleepover since their dormitory days, Eric and Min-woo came up with the 'Farting Exercise'. In the morning they were caught off-guard with an early morning mission. Later on Shinhwa member teamed up to play dodge ball against their managers, with a traditional feast of Chuncheon for the winning team.			
17	7 July 2012	School Channel: God of Classroom	Teacher: Jang Dong-hyuk. Jun Jin was absent, recovering in hospital following microscopic nerve decompression surgery from chronic back pain.	
18	14 July 2012	Trendy Channel: Shinhwa's Dignity		
19	21 July 2012	Trendy Channel: Shinhwa's Dignity		
20	28 July 2012	Farming Channel: Shinhwa Outing	Shinhwa members enjoy outing at Pocheon village. Hyesung Hidden Camera	
21	4 August 2012	Farming Channel: Shinhwa Outing		
22	12 August 2012	Friendship Channel: The Best Friend		
23	18 August 2012	Friendship Channel: The Best Friend		
24	25 August 2012	Sageuk Channel: Historical Drama Olympics (1)	Jang Dong-hyuk role play as King Sukjong of Joseon	
24	With the Sageuk theme of historical drama Shinhwa members dressed up in traditional court hanbok imitating infamous royal concubine Jang Hui-bin of Joseon Dynasty. Members compete against each other in tasks themed in historical dramas.			
25	1 September 2012	Sageuk Channel: Historical Drama Olympics (2)		
25	Continuing to compete against each other, sometimes in two teams of three, Shinhwa member carried on with the historical dramas theme tasks, e.g. draw each other's portrait a la Painter of the Wind.			
26	8 September 2012	Roadtrip Channel: The Thieves		
27	15 September 2012	Roadtrip Channel: The Thieves		
28	22 September 2012	Global Channel: Hallyu Battle with Super Junior	Yesung, Shindong, Sungmin, Eunhyuk, Ryeowook, and Kyuhyun	
29	29 September 2012	Global Channel: Hallyu Battle with Super Junior	Yesung, Shindong, Sungmin, Eunhyuk, Ryeowook, and Kyuhyun	
30	6 October 2012	Fashion Channel: Model, Shinhwa (1)	guests: Han Jin, Kim Won-kyoung, Ji Hyun-jeong, Lee Hyoni, Yang Yoon-young, and Song Hae-na	
30	Six top models of South Korea were tasked with judging the fashion terrorist of the group, based on their everyday wear, i.e. sans stylists. Dong-wan was initially chosen as the worst dressed from photos but when the models saw what members wore to the shoot, they also picked Jun Jin and Eric. They explained that Jun Jin just wears whatever, and was bluntly told not to dress himself. As for Eric, they said that although he has a nice buff body, but in the striped shirt he wore, he just looks like a tuna trapped in a net. Min-woo was chosen as the best dressed all round.			
31	13 October 2012	Fashion Channel: Model, Shinhwa (2)	guests: Han Jin, Kim Won-kyoung, Ji Hyun-jeong, Lee Hyoni, Yang Yoon-young, and Song Hae-na	
31	Shinhwa and the models were split into three groups of two couple each. They were tasked with putting on a runway fashion show with the theme of 'Autumn', where they have to design their concept, music, lighting, make-up and shop for clothes on a limited budget. The pre-show features special guest performances by Mighty Mouth and G.NA. The most daring was Eric, who strutted down the runway in tight leather shorts, a short bob wig in imitation of Matilda from Léon: The Professional, dubbed 'Eatilda'.			
32	21 October 2012	Best of Channel		

== Season two: Tutorials ==
The format for segment was studio based. Where each week experts on a specific topic were invited to give Shinhwa members private tutorials to learn the tricks of their trade. The episodes also started with a briefing by Shin Hye-sung, dubbed 'Shin Brief'. Timeslot: Sundays at 19:40

No episode was aired on 16 December 2012, due to the presidential debates for the 2012 South Korean presidential election.

Episode #	Original broadcast date	Title	Notes	Ref
33	28 October 2012	Private Tutorial: Anipang	best student: Shin Hye-sung	
33	In the new format for the programme Shinhwa members receive private lessons from experts on cellphone game, Anipang. Revealing the best and worst player, with Andy scoring 520,000 points and first time player Kim Dong-wan not able to beat Andy, who played without looking at the screen. The most improved was Shin-Hye-sung. Shin Brief: members' variety skills chart from season one.			
34	4 November 2012	Private Tutorial: Villainous Acting (1)	guest: Jung Ho-keun	
34	In this episode, members received tutoring on villainous acting from veteran actor Jang on the skills of being acting the bad guy. Shin Brief: members' acting experiences.			
35	11 November 2012	Private Tutorial: Villainous Acting (2) / Private Tutorial: Ballet (1)	guest: Jung Ho-keun and Jung Kyung-ho best student: Lee Min-woo (acting)	
35	In the first part of this episode the Shinhwa boys continue their acting lessons and were tested on acting out an un-seen script and judged by actors Jung Ho-keun and Jung Kyung-ho, with Min-woo judged the best. In the second Shinhwa were taught by three principal dancers of Universal Ballet on the skills of ballerino, star male ballet performer of a dance company. Andy was praised for being the most flexible with the most open pelvis.			
36	18 November 2012	Private Tutorial: Ballet (2)	best student: Lee Min-woo	
37	25 November 2012	Private Tutorial: Dubbing	best student: Jun Jin	
38	2 December 2012	Private Tutorial: Living Alone	best student: Andy	
39	9 December 2012	Private Tutorial: Hosting Parties (1)	guest: Kim Shin-young best student: Andy	
40	23 December 2012	Private Tutorial: Hosting Parties (2)	guest: Kim Shin-young best student: Andy	
41	30 December 2012	Private Tutorial: Chinese astrology face reading	guest: Eastern Philosophy professor Jo Kyu-moon best student: Lee Min-woo	
42	6 January 2013	Private Tutorial: How to train a pet snake	guest: Mr Lee Dong-hee best student: Eric	
42	Shinhwa members brought their pet dogs on set for a play date, which included Eric's Gomdori, Andy's Fany and Lee Min-woo's Poly. Kim Dong-wan's Goguma was away with his mother and; both Shin Hye-sung and Jun Jin did not have one. To commemorate the Year of the Snake for 2013, members filmed the episode with 50 kinds of snakes, from cute babies to Burmese Python, including ten kinds of rare and exotic snakes.			
43	13 January 2013	Private Tutorial: Art of Cheerleading	guests: Park Ki-ryang and Kim Yeon-jung, cheerleaders best student: Lee Min-woo	
43	During the briefing session, each members wrote messages of good wishes for the new year ahead. These messages written in messy handwritings were read out by Shin. This was followed by learning to master the moves, kicks and jumps of a cheerleading routine.			
44	20 January 2013	Private Tutorial: Speech Class	guest: Kim Mi-kyung, speech teacher best student: Kim Dong-Wan	
44	Quotes by members from the past 15 years were discussed during the briefing session, where Shin's quote "For seven years, I sweated without the members knowing" was discussed. He explained that "I'm a singer who dances, but I′m not a very good dancer, so I think I said it after practicing more than the other members". Which ended up becoming an argument on who is a better dancer between Shin and Kim Dong-wan. After the brief they received their private lesson on good speaking skills.			
45	27 January 2013	I Love You More Studio Sistar special (1)	guests: Hyolyn, Bora, Soyou and Dasom	
45	In a spoof of MBC's Love Studio, Shinhwa and Sistar members compete among each other, to be paired off as 'husband and wife'. The couples played games and learn how to cook a meal together. With the four-member girl-group, two Shinhwa members were paired off in a male-male couple.			
46	3 February 2013	I Love You More Studio Sistar special (2)	guests: Hyolyn, Bora, Soyou, Dasom and Leo Kang of MasterChef Korea. MC: Jang Dong-hyuk	
46	The Shinhwa and Sistar couples compete in 'newlywed cook-off' tournament, where they did their grocery shopping as couples, and prepare their best dish to be judged by MasterChef Korea celebrity chef and judge Leo Kang.			
47	10 February 2013	Girls' Generation special (1)	Yoona Hidden Camera. MC: Jang Dong-hyuk guests: Taeyeon, Sunny, Hyoyeon, Yuri, Sooyoung and Yoona	
47	Shinhwa and SNSD members conspired to pull a hidden camera prank on Yoona. Where she was teased with a first ranking, only to be told that it was a ranking for the worst looking SNSD member seen in person and they further added that she looked older than her real age. Hyoyeon tried to teach Kim Dong-wan the choreography to their new song "I Got a Boy" but only to shock them with his dirty version and destroying Sunny's fantasy of him.			
48	17 February 2013	Girls' Generation special (2)	Fun Cohabitation parody guests: Taeyeon, Sunny, Hyoyeon, Yuri, Sooyoung and Yoona	
48	In a parody of television show Fun Cohabitation, Shinhwa and SNSD members had heart-to-heart talks on topics from longest running K-Pop band, surviving in the competitive entertainment industry, flights, solo activities and getting days off.			
49	24 February 2013	2013 World Baseball Classic special	Special appearance: jTBC announcer Jang Sung-kyu. guests: Park Sung-ho, Jung Bum-gyun, Choi Hyo-jong, Park Hwi-soon, Kim In-shik, Hong Il-jum, and Oh Cho-hee	
49	To celebrate the 2013 World Baseball Classic Shinhwa members and guests South Korean comedians compete against each other in a not-so-classic game of baseball, with Park Sung-ho dressed in an alien outfit.			

== Season three: Mother's Touch cooking competition ==
Shinhwa members in a new concept for the show learn secret recipes and cooking techniques from mothers. Whose dishes were then judged alongside their teachers' as the authentic dish with the real mother's touch. The last member to guess correctly the identity of the guest mother became 'Shinhwa's feet', i.e. errand boy, and had to wear a bright orange tracksuit emblazoned as such, for the remainder of the episode. Kim Dong-wan did not join the group for the filming this segment, due to filming commitments for daily drama Cheer Up, Mr. Kim! on Korean Broadcasting System.

Episode #	Original broadcast date	Title	Notes	Ref
50	7 April 2013	Mother's Touch cooking competition	guest mother: Mir's (MBLAQ) and actress Go Eun-ah mother Shinhwa's feet: Hye-sung	
50	In this first episode members taste tested MBLAQ boy band member Mir and actress Go Eun-ah's mother cooking and went on to cook for themselves. In an all round defeat the guests correctly picked all five of their mother's dishes.			
51	14 April 2013	Mother's Touch cooking competition	guest mother: TV personality Christina Confalonieri's mother-in-law Shinhwa's feet: Eric	
51	In a first for the show, Cristina's sister-in-law guessed Eric's and Min-woo's dishes as the ones with the mother's touch.			
52	21 April 2013	Mother's Touch cooking competition	guest mother: actor Park Jun-gyu's wife. Shinhwa's feet: Eric	
52	Again in an all round defeat Park Jun-gyu and his two sons correctly picked all five of the authentic mother's touch dishes. In a side bet between Eric and Andy during shopping over the size of dried fish to buy, which resulted in Andy wearing red underwear in the following episode.			
53	28 April 2013	Mother's Touch cooking competition	guest mother: actor Lee Jung-ryong's wife. Shinhwa's feet: Eric	
53	The Shinhwa members reunited with Lee Jung-ryong's two sons, who previously appeared in the "Children Channel" episodes in season one. In this episode members were paired up to cook three dishes with Shinhwa's feet, i.e. Eric, making his dish by himself. After donning red underwear to fulfill his pledged for losing his bet with Eric the previous week. Andy proposed that the first two members, whose dish was the first to be eliminated in the taste test to wear red underwear at the opening of the next episode. The two dishes by Eric, Hye-sung and Andy passed the test and were picked as the ones with the mother's touch.			
54	5 May 2013	Race to Find Mother in Daejeon	surprise (voice) cameo: Leeteuk punishee: Min-woo and Jun Jin	
54	Min-woo and Jun Jin underwent their punishment of wearing red underwear, for being eliminated in the previous episode. Shinhwa members were tasked with finding a celebrity lookalike at Daejeon Station within 10 minutes. Whereupon both Andy and Min-woo bumped into Leeteuk of Super Junior, on military service as a PR agent, who was at the station on promotional duty with fellow soldier Sangchoo of Mighty Mouth. Due to military restrictions, he could not appear on screen but his voice could be heard greeting Min-woo.			
55	12 May 2013	Mother's Touch cooking competition	guest mother: comedian twins Lee Sang-ho and Lee Sang-min's (Gag Concert) mother. Shinhwa's feet: Eric	
55	The twins and their comedian father picked two out of three dishes and took home ₩2,000,000. Older twin Sang-ho was first to challenge and correctly picked his mother's dish resulting in Jun Jin and Andy receiving punishment the following episode. Then younger twin Sang-min guessed wrongly that Min-woo and Hye-sung's soup was his mother's.			
56	19 May 2013	Race to Find Mother	punishee: Jun Jin and Andy breakdance in red underwear	
57	26 May 2013	Mother's Touch cooking competition	guest mother: comedian Jung Jong-chul's mother. Shinhwa's feet: Jun Jin	
58	2 June 2013	"Mission to rescue Andy" (1)	guests: Infinite Girls. punishee: Eric and Hye-sung	
58	Eric and Hye-sung, whose dish was eliminated in the previous episode, wore full body kangaroo and panda fursuits respectively, for the first mission as their punishment. At the beginning of the episode, unbeknown to each of the members, Andy was kidnapped by MBC Every 1's Infinite Girls. In order to rescue him the remaining members had to fulfill missions set by the girls, e.g. sell pork belly on the street and vogue dance in a public square.			
59	9 June 2013	"Mission to rescue Andy" (2)	guests: Infinite Girls	
59	The members continue their mission in an attempt to rescue Andy, which led to Min-woo also being taken briefly by the girls. The final confrontation was a cook-off between the two camps. N.B. On 4 June, Shinhwa Broadcast production team apologized on Twitter over issues that arose from the previous episode where Andy was shown to be 'tortured' with kisses and excessive groping.			
60	16 June 2013	"This MT: Past-Present-Future"	MT=Membership Training. Special appearance: jTBC announcer Jang Sung-kyu	

== Season 2: Little Legends ==
Shinhwa went to look for unsung heroes in the community and will experience their daily lives for 2 days and 1 night. Kim Dong-wan confirmed his departure from the show after not participating in Mother's Touch competition segment of season one and stated that he wishes to concentrate on his acting career.ntrate on his acting career.

Episode No.	Episode No. (Season)	TItle	Little Legends	Guest	Notes
61	1	Angels of the Wild	Dany and Lee Mi-ja		
61	1	Shinhwa went and volunteers to a shelter that houses abandoned cats and dogs.			
62	2	Angels of the Wild	Dany and Lee Mi-ja	Jang Sung-kyu (Announcer)	
62	2	Shinhwa organized a fashion show showcasing their chosen dogs.			
63	3	Chinese Restaurant (Jjajangmyeon of Love)	Lee Do-han (Owner)		
63	3	Shinhwa went to a Chinese restaurant, which is known for giving out free jjajangmyeon to the elderly and person with disability once a month, and helped. Andy and Eric became helpers in the kitchen and Junjin and Hyesung became delivery boys while Minwoo, who arrived late, helped in the hall.			
64	4	Chinese Restaurant (Jjajangmyeon of Love)	Lee Do-han (Owner)		
64	4	Shinhwa and the owners prepares for the event. Eric and Andy helps in the kitchen and Junjin and Hyesung helps in the hall while Minwoo fetched the elderly in their homes. After the event, the members did one last delivery to two houses. The gift prepared by the members is also given to the owner.			
65	5	Archery Training Centre	Kim Hyung-tak and Maja Jager		Andy stepped down due to his scandal.
65	5	Shinhwa met Kim Hyung-tak (Archery coach) and Maja Jager (Athlete) and trained with them. The members played a 3-round game to decide who would play against Maja. The members also prepared a surprise for Maja.			Andy stepped down due to his scandal.
66	6	Archery Training Centre	Kim Hyung-tak and Maja Jager	Jang Sung-kyu (Announcer) Kim Jin-ho (Athlete) & Kim Kyeong-uk (Athlete)	
66	6	Shinhwa and Maja, together with the other Archery athletes, competed against each other for snacks and the losers will be penalized. The members contacted Coach Kim Hyung-taks's former students, Athlete Kim Jin-ho and Athlete Kim Kyeong-uk, and prepared a surprise event for the coach. Afterwards, the members and the athletes are divided into 2 teams with Kim JIn-jo and Kim Kyeong-uk as their coaches. An honorable student is also picked at the end of the competition.			
67	7	Puppet Theater	I Keeper	Eunji (Apink), Lizzy (After School), & Jang Sung-kyu (Announcer)	
67	7	The members almost missed the train to Busan after arriving late and met Eunji and Lizzy at the train. The members, Eunji, and Lizzy played a quiz related to Busan in the train ride. Afterwards, they went to a daycare center where they watched the Little Legends, I Keeper, perform a puppetry play. Then, they learned how to do puppetry and did a small skit. The members and the gust are divided into 2 groups and they each escorted an elderly home. Eric, Min-woo, and Eunji learned that the elderly they are escorting is the grandmother of a missing child which became famous in Busan.			
68	8	Puppet Theater	I Keeper	Eunji (Apink), Lizzy (After School), & Jang Sung-kyu (Announcer)	
68	8	Shinhwa, Eunji, Lizzy, and I Keeper prepared and performed a puppet play for the children.			
69	9	Boxing Brothers	Kang Dong-heon and Kang Moo-soo	Eunji (Apink)	
69	9	Shinhwa and Eunji went to Jinju to meet the Little Legends who are brothers who practices boxing. They pulled a hidden camera to the brothers with Eunji since she's their favorite female celebrity. Shinhwa also joined the training session with the boxing athletes while Eunji and Minwoo secretly cooked dinner for the brothers and the coach.			
70	10	Boxing Brothers	Kang Dong-heon and Kang Moo-soo	Park Cheong-pal (Boxer), Park Sung-kyu, Eunji (Apink), & Crayon Pop	Last Episode
70	10	A boxing competition was held against the Little Legend's rival school. Shinhwa also prepared a performance for the audience.			Last Episode
