= Shinhwa Broadcasting =

South Korean variety show starring Shinhwa

- Promotional poster (season one) (L to R: Andy, Kim Dong-wan, Shin Hye-sung, Jun Jin, Lee Min-woo and Eric)
- Hangul: 신화방송
- Hanja: 神話放送
- RR: Sinhwabangsong
- MR: Sinhwabangsong
- Genre: Variety
- Presented by: Eric Mun; Lee Min-woo; Kim Dong-wan (2012 to April 2013); Shin Hye-sung; Jun Jin; Andy Lee (2012 to November 2013)
- Country of origin: South Korea
- Original language: Korean
- No. of seasons: 2
- No. of episodes: 70 (list of episodes)

Production
- Producer: Yoon Hyun-jun
- Production location: Korea
- Running time: 60 minutes on Sundays at 23:00 (KST)

Original release
- Network: jTBC
- Release: 17 March 2012 – 19 January 2014

Shinhwa Broadcast (Korean: 신화방송) is a South Korean variety television programme broadcast on general service cable channel JTBC. It is hosted by six-member boy band Shinhwa: Eric Mun, Lee Min-woo, Kim Dong-wan (up until April 2013), Shin Hye-sung, Jun Jin and Andy Lee (up until November 2013). The weekly programme premiered on 17 March 2012, and airs on Sundays at 23:00. The show went on hiatus after the 16 June 2013 broadcast and it returned on 3 November 2013 with a new format for season two. As of 8 December 2013, 65 episodes in two seasons have been broadcast.

== History ==
Shinhwa Broadcast is part of Shinhwa's comeback to the entertainment industry in March 2012, after a four-year hiatus, during which band members served mandatory military service. The show is also the group's first exclusive variety programme. It is the first variety show that circles around a K-pop group, with the Shinhwa members as both the MCs and the members of the show. The show is produced by Yoon Hyun-jun, who previously worked on another jTBC programme, Girls' Generation and the Dangerous Boys. The producers held a public shooting and press conference at the Jamsil Students' Gymnasium on 15 March to showcase the programme.

On the programme, leader Eric said "In order to differentiate ourselves from other K-pop groups and to make our strengths stand out, we made Shinhwa Broadcast. We've found a program that could go for a long run and met producers that we can trust". Jun Jin also commented that being in the show took them back to the time when they lived together and were really close to each other. He further added that the show "allows us to mentally let go of ourselves".

The show premiered on Saturday, 17 March 2012, at 22:00. In May, the programme changed its timeslot from 22:00 to 23:00. On 13 October, the show was given a new timeslot and changed format, from episode 33 on 28 October, it aired on Sundays at 19:40, where member received Private Tutorials on various topics.

It was announced on 24 February during the 49th episodes that the show is to go on hiatus while members concentrate on preparing for their 15th Anniversary Concert being held on 16 and 17 March at the Olympic Gymnastics Arena, and 11th studio album released in May 2013. It returned on 7 April with a new format of Mother's Touch cooking competition. On 22 May 2013, jTBC announced that the show is to again go on hiatus from 16 June 2013 onwards, initially until September, whilst Shinhwa members are on tour in Asia for their 2013 Shinhwa Grand Tour: The Classic.

The show returned in November, after a hiatus of five months, for the second season of Small Legends Found By Shinhwa in a new time slot of 23:00. A new opening sequence for the show was filmed, and a behind-the-scene video was also released.

== Format ==
=== Season one: Channels ===
Although Shinhwa Broadcasting does not have a resident MC, Jang Dong-hyuk sometimes guest hosts the show. In season one, each recording is usually divided and broadcast as two episodes in consecutive weeks.

Jun Jin was absent from the recording of episode 17, "School Channel: God of Classroom", broadcast on 7 July 2012. He was in a hospital, recovering from a microscopic nerve decompression surgery, which he had had to undergo because of chronic back pain.

=== Season one: Tutorials ===
The format for season two was studio based. Where each week experts on a specific topic were invited to give Shinhwa members private tutorials to learn the tricks of their trade, e.g. villainous acting, ballet, cheerleading. The episodes also started with a briefing by Shin Hye-sung, dubbed 'Shin Brief', on a topic related to the week's topic, e.g. members' acting experiences, drunken habits, ideal types. At the end of the episodes the experts chooses the best or most improved student.

On 16 December 2012, no episode was aired due to the presidential debates for the 2012 South Korean presidential election.

=== Season one: Mother's Touch cooking competition ===
Shinhwa members in a new concept for the show learn secret recipes and cooking techniques from mothers. Whose dishes were then judged alongside their teachers' as to which ones are the authentic dish with the real mother's touch. Kim Dong-wan was unable to join the group for the filming, due to filming commitments for daily drama Cheer Up, Mr. Kim! on Korean Broadcasting System. His leave of absence continue until after the drama ended its broadcast on 26 April 2013, until the show again went on hiatus in June 2013.

=== Season two: Small Legends ===
The new season is themed with Small Legends Found By Shinhwa, that aims to highlight and share stories of unsung heroes in the community. However member Kim Dong-wan confirmed his departure from the show, after having been absent for the Mother's Touch cooking competition segment of season one. It was announced that Dong-wan wished to concentrate on his acting career.

== List of episodes and guests ==
Guest Leo Kang of MasterChef Korea, who appeared in episode 46 to judge the 'newlywed cook-off' tournament, reportedly agreed to participate because he enjoys watching Shinhwa Broadcasting. Also members of girl group Girls' Generation admitted to being fans of the show, who begged their managers to arrange for them to be guests and the nine girls were in fierce competition for the six spots.

Episode(s)	Guest	Notes
2 & 17	Choi Hong-man	special appearance to deliver a mission
7 & 8	Mason, Mavin and Maiden Moon and actor Lee Jung-ryong's two sons Mideum and Maeum	plus seven other children aged 5 to 8
12, 13 & 14	SHINee	Onew, Jonghyun, Key, Minho, and Taemin
28 & 29	Super Junior	Yesung, Shindong, Sungmin, Eunhyuk, Ryeowook, and Kyuhyun
30 & 31	Han Jin, Kim Won-kyoung, Ji Hyun-jeong, Lee Hyoni, Yang Yoon-young, and Song Hae-na	Features special performances by Mighty Mouth and G.NA
34 & 35	Jung Ho-keun and Jung Kyung-ho (ep 35)	
45 & 46	Sistar and Leo Kang of MasterChef Korea (ep 46)	Hyolyn, Bora, Soyou and Dasom
47 & 48	Girls' Generation	Taeyeon, Sunny, Hyoyeon, Yuri, Sooyoung and Yoona
50	Mir (MBLAQ) and Go Eun-ah	
58 & 59	Infinite Girls	

== Reception ==
According to AGB Nielsen Media Research, the premiere episode achieved a nationwide rating of 0.336% and the subsequent episodes attained viewership of between 0.3% to 0.8%. Episode nine, however, showed an increase of 0.572% to 1.371% of viewership ratings, which was followed by placing first in viewership ratings with 1.312% for episode 13, the second episode with guest star Shinee, making the programme the most watched general service channel show that day.

Episodes 41 aired on 30 December 2012 with Eastern Philosophy professor Jo Kyu-moon as guest to read member's fortunes, ended 2012 with the programme's highest ratings to date. The episode recorded a nationwide rating of 1.881% with a by the minute peak of 2.994 percent.

=== Season one ===
Episode #	Original broadcast date	Title	Ratings (%)	Ref
Channels
1	17 March 2012	"SF Channel: superhero rescues President's daughter"	0.336	
9	12 May 2012	"Remake Channel: New Family Arcade" (1)	1.371	
13	9 June 2012	"Guest Channel: Shinhwa vs SHINee" (2)	1.312	
16	30 June 2012	"Travel Channel: God of MT" (3)	1.080	
18	14 July 2012	"Trendy Channel: Shinhwa's Dignity" (1)	1.243	
31	13 October 2012	"Fashion Channel: Model catwalk" (2)	0.459	
32	21 October 2012	"Best of Channel"	0.663	
Private Tutorial
33	28 October 2012	"Anipang"	1.018	
34	4 November 2012	"Villainous Acting" (1)	0.596	
35	11 November 2012	"Villainous Acting" (2) / "Private Tutorial: Ballet" (1)	0.598	
36	18 November 2012	"Ballet" (2)	0.653	
37	25 November 2012	"Dubbing"	0.837	
38	2 December 2012	"Living Alone"	1.353	
39	9 December 2012	"Hosting Parties" (1)	0.934	
40	23 December 2012	"Hosting Parties" (2)	0.557	
41	30 December 2012	"Chinese astrology face reading"	1.881	
42	6 January 2013	"How to train a pet snake"	1.377	
43	13 January 2013	"Art of Cheerleading"	0.998	
44	20 January 2013	"Speech Class"	1.289	
45	27 January 2013	"I Love You More Studio Sistar special" (1)	1.340	
46	3 February 2013	"I Love You More Studio Sistar special" (2)	0.912	
47	10 February 2013	"Girls' Generation special" (1)	1.173	
48	17 February 2013	"Girls' Generation special" (2)	0.931	
49	24 February 2013	"2013 World Baseball Classic special"	0.964	
Mother's Touch cooking competition
50	7 April 2013	"Mir's (MBLAQ) mother"	0.942	
51	14 April 2013	"Christina Confalonieri's mother-in-law"	0.897	
52	21 April 2013	"Park Jun-gyu's wife"	1.035	
53	28 April 2013	"Lee Jung-ryong's wife"	0.737	
54	5 May 2013	"Race to Find Mother in Daejeon"	1.076	
55	12 May 2013	"Lee Sang-ho and Lee Sang-min's (Gag Concert) mother"	0.697	
56	19 May 2013	"Race to Find Mother"	0.69	
57	26 May 2013	"Jung Jong-chul's mother"	0.738	
58	2 June 2013	"Mission to rescue Andy" (1)	0.941	
59	9 June 2013	"Mission to rescue Andy" (2)	1.042	
60	16 June 2013	"This MT: Past-Present-Future"	0.813	

=== Season two ===
Episode #	Original broadcast date	Title	Ratings (%)	Ref
Small Legends
61	3 November 2013	"Animal Shelter for Abandoned dogs"	1.084	
62	10 November 2013	"Animal Shelter for Abandoned dogs"	1.137	

== International broadcast ==
- Mnet Japan - weekly broadcast, from December 2012
