= Route 0 (group) =

Japanese pop music group

- Origin: Tokyo, Japan
- Genres: J-pop
- Years active: 2002–2003
- Label: R & C Ltd.
- Past members: Marina Takahashi; Choi Soo-young
- Website: yoshimoto-me.co.jp/artist/route0/

Route 0 (ルート・ヨン, Rūto Yon; stylized route φ) was a Japanese-South Korean idol girl group formed by R & C Ltd. in 2002. The group consists of Marina Takahashi and Choi Soo-young.

== History ==
In December 2001, Asayan held the Japanese-Korean Ultra Idol Duo Audition, which was broadcast on TV Tokyo. Out of 15,000 applicants, Marina Takahashi was chosen as the Japanese representative, while Choi Soo-young was chosen as the Korean representative.

Route 0 released "Start" as their first single on April 26, 2002, which was used as the opening theme song to Hamaraja. The song was produced by Ryuichi Kawamura. They also appeared on Oha Suta for a 3-day television feature, as well as exclusive models for the junior fashion brand Chubbygang and the magazine Melon. "Waku Waku It's Love" was released on November 9, 2002, as the ending theme song to Hey! Hey! Hey! Music Champ for the month of November 2002. On July 23, 2003, Route 0 released "Painting" as their third single, which was the ending theme song to Downtown DX. On the same day, a video single version of "Painting" was also released. After 2003, Route 0 ended activities together. Takahashi retired from entertainment, while Soo-young would later go on to become a member of South Korean girl group Girls' Generation in 2007 and would also become an actress.

== Members ==
- Marina Takahashi (高橋麻里奈)
- Choi Soo-young (チェ・スヨン)

== Discography ==
=== Singles ===
Title	Year	Peak chart positions	Album
Title	Year	JPN	Album
"Start"	2002	62	Non-album single
"Waku Waku It's Love" (ワクワク It’s Love)	2002	—	Non-album single
"Painting"	2003	—	Non-album single
"—" denotes releases that did not chart or were not released in that region.

==== Video singles ====
Title	Year	Peak chart positions	Album
Title	Year	JPN	Album
"Painting"	2003	—	Non-album single
"—" denotes releases that did not chart or were not released in that region.
