= Saram Entertainment =

South Korean Entertainment company

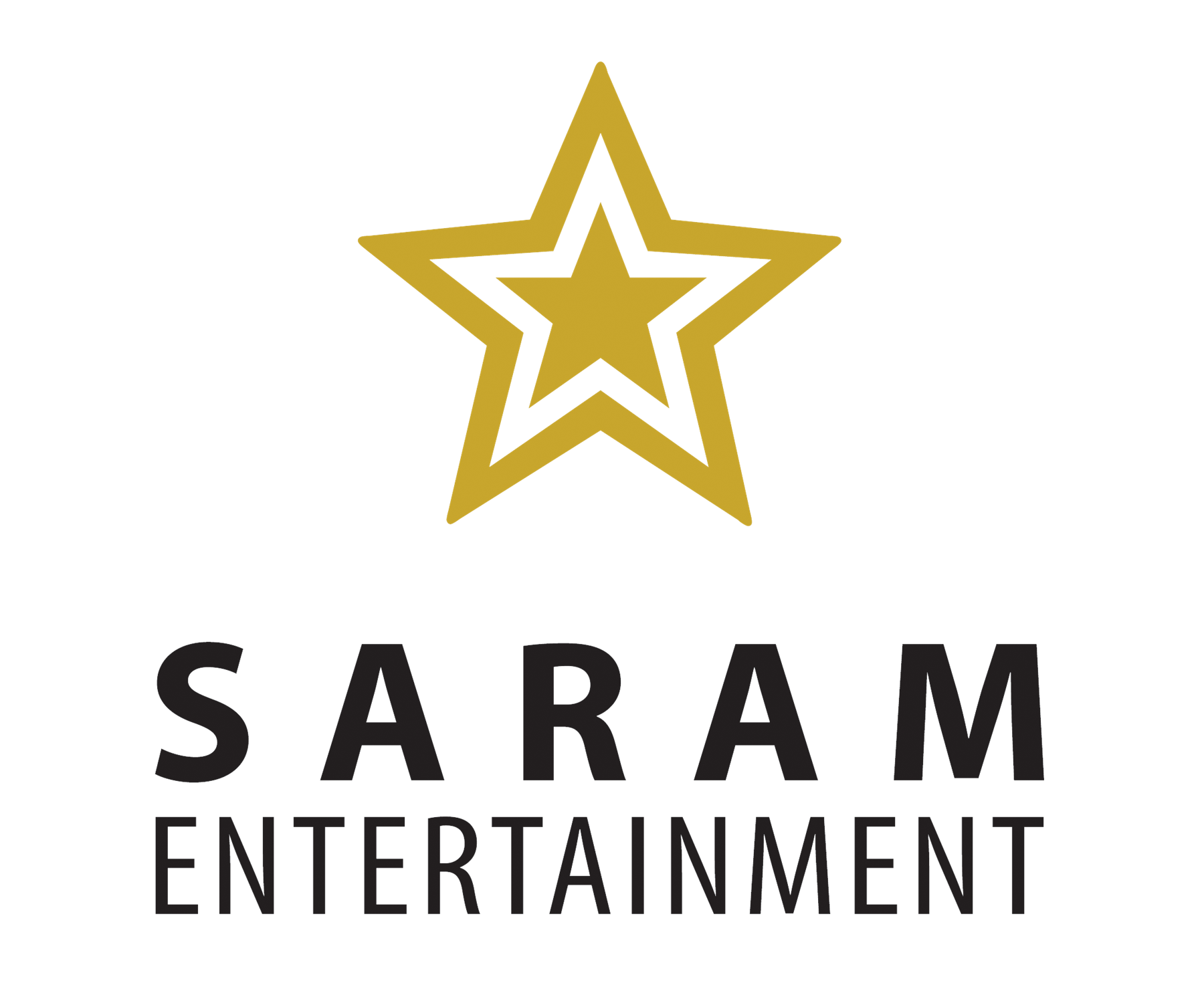
- Native name: 사람엔테테인먼트
- Industry: Entertainment; Management
- Founder: So-young Lee
- Headquarters: 2-4F, Saram Entertainment, 240-22, Yeonnam dong, Mapo-gu, Seoul, South Korea
- Key people: Lee So-young (Founder, CEO)
- Services: Talent agency
- Owner: Lee So-young - 40% Lee Sang-rok (through Standus Corporation) - 40% Kim Hyun-suk - 20%
- Parent: Standus Corporation
- Website: Official website

Saram Entertainment (Korean: 사람엔터테인먼트) is an entertainment company in South Korea, founded by Lee So-young in 2006 and partakes in artist management and film production. It currently operates as a subsidiary of Standus Corporation.

== Current artists ==
=== Actors ===
- Claudia Kim (2025–present)
- Choi Hee-jin
- Choi Min-young
- Choi Soo-young
- Cha Jung-won
- David Lee McInnis
- Gong Myung
- Han Ye-ri
- Hong Ki-joon
- Jeon Chae-eun
- Jeong So-ri
- Jung In-ji
- Irene Kim
- Ki Hong Lee
- Kim Jae-young
- Kim Sung-kyu
- Kim Yu-an
- Ko Jun
- Lee Ga-sub
- Lee Hae-woo
- Lee Joo-young
- Lee Seo-jun
- Lee So-i
- Lee Soo-hyuk
- Lee Sung-wook
- Lee Woon-san
- Lee Ha-na
- Lee Yeon-hee
- Min Seong-wook
- Moon Dong-hyeok
- Oh Eun-seo
- Park Gyu-young
- Park Ye-jin
- Seo Ha-jeong
- Shim Dal-gi
- Shin Jae-hwi
- Son Woo-hyeon
- YooA
- Yoo Hee-jae

== Former artists ==
=== Actor ===
- Byun Yo-han (2014–2023)
- Cho Jin-woong (?–2025)
- Choi Won-young (2014–2024)
- Jung Ho-yeon (2020–2025)
- Kim Min-ha (2021–2024)
- Kwon Yul (2012–2023)
- Honey Lee (2014–2024)
- Lee Je-hoon (2009–2021)
- Song Jae-rim (2022–2024)
- Uhm Jung-hwa (2019–2024)
- Yoon So-hee (2022–2026)

== Filmography ==
=== Film ===
Year	Title	Associated Production	Distributor
2012	Ghost Sweepers	Dasepo Club	Next Entertainment World
2013	An Ethics Lesson	TPS Company	Lotte Cultureworks
2021	Spiritwalker	BA Entertainment	Avio Entertainment; Megabox JoongAng PlusM
2024	Dead Man	Palette Pictures	Megabox Plus M
TBA	Woman Driving BMW	TBA	TBA
TBA	Garden of Iron	TBA	TBA
TBA	Shame	TBA	TBA
TBA	Unlock the Mystery	Mind2Mind Pictures; One Pictures	TBA

=== Television series ===
Year	Title	Associated Production	Ref.
2023–2024	Death's Game	SLL; Studio N	
2024	Knight Flower	Base Story; Film Grida	
TBA	Aloha, My Mothers	TBA	
TBA	Ghost Crown Prince	TBA	
TBA	Switching App	Unhasu Film	
TBA	7 Things from Wonderland	TBA	
TBA	7 Years Battle	Bigstone Pictures	
TBA	Burning Heat	Engine Film	
