= Grand Tour: The Classic =

2013 concert tour by Shinhwa

2013 Shinhwa Grand Tour: The Classic
- Asia tour by Shinhwa
- Promotional poster
- Location: Asia
- Associated album: The Classic
- Start date: 16 March 2013
- End date: 4 August 2013
- No. of shows: 12
- Website: www.shinhwacompany.co.kr

Shinhwa concert chronology
- 2012 Shinhwa Grand Tour: The Return (2012); 2013 Shinhwa Grand Tour: The Classic (2013)

2013 Shinhwa Grand Tour: The Classic was the Asia-wide live concert tour of South Korean boy band Shinhwa in support of their eleventh studio album, The Classic, which was released on 16 May 2013.

The tour commenced with two prologue shows in Seoul on 16 and 17 March 2013, titled 2013 Shinhwa 15th Anniversary Concert: The Legend Continues, in celebration of the group's 15th anniversary on 24 March. The tour continues, at the conclusion of promotional activities in Korea for the album, with one show in Hong Kong, two in China, two in Taiwan and three in Japan in June, July; and concluded with two finale shows in Seoul, titled 2013 Shinhwa Grand Finale: The Classic in Seoul in August 2013. In total 12 shows in six cities and five countries.

== Concerts ==
=== Seoul concerts ===
The concerts were first announced in January 2013, it was announced that the group is to resume their music activities as a group with the release of their eleventh studio album and 15th anniversary concert in March. On 30 January, information on ticketing and a teaser video were released. In celebration of the anniversary, the Shinhwa 15th Anniversary Photo Exhibition Contest was held in conjunction of the concerts. The exhibition included Shinhwa's memories and defining moments since their debut in 1998, as well as 15 memorable items submitted by fans, with each receiving a prize of an autographed copy of Shinhwa’s 11th album.

On 13 February 2013, the tickets for the two 15th anniversary concerts in Seoul went on sale, with prices ranging from ₩66,000 to ₩143,000. It was accompanied by a second teaser video, where the members reminisced on their 90s tacky fashion, performing as veteran idols, their fan club Shinhwa Changjo, the forecoming concert tour, and their 15-year friendship. The 25,000 tickets were sold out within five minutes of going on sale, by over 300,000 people who tried to buy the tickets, who caused the server of Interpark to continually shut down during the five minutes of sale. For the concert members donned new styling looks, with Andy in a 'Greek Prince' look; and Jun Jin and Hye-sung in different shades of blond hair.

The tickets for the two Grand Finale shows in Seoul, went on sell at 20:00 on 12 June 2013 at Interpak. The 27,000 tickets for the two concerts were again sold out within five minutes of going on sale with the server for the ticketing website crashing after seven minutes. Ahead of the final concert on 4 August, Shinhwa members held a press conference. They talked about their plans for solo activities for the remainder of the year, and the success of the 11th album and tour. The Grand Finale concerts also included parody videos by the members of 2012 film Nameless Gangster: Rules of the Time.

=== Asia tour ===
At the commencement of the Grand Tour, Shinhwa Company announced that a commemorative necklace of the group's 15th anniversary, named "Forever", will be on sale at each location, starting with the Hong Kong concerts. The design of the necklace is the same as the one worn by Kim Dong-wan and Jun Jin in the music video of "This Love". The group will donate portions of the proceeds to the city of the concert, as part of members' wish to return their fans' support.

The concert in Hong Kong marks the first time in their 15 years career, that they had performed in the city. The show was attended by 15,000 people and the group performed their hit songs such as "Only One", "Hey, Come On", "Perfect Man", "Wedding" and "Brand New"; as well as new tracks, "This Love" and "That′s Right", "New Me", "Acquainted Guy" and "Love Song", from their 2013 album The Classic.

== Setlist ==
Seoul, South Korea (16 and 17 March 2013)

NB: songs not in performance order.

- Opening
- "Only One"
- "Your Man"
- MENT #1
- "Sharing Forever"
- "Hey Come On"

First video interlude

- "Free"
- "You’re My Everything"
- "Prayer"
- MENT #2
- "How Do I Say"
- "Be My Love"
- "Stay"
- "Uh Sha Uh Sha"

Second video interlude

- "T.O.P"
- "Perfect Man"
- "Shooting Star" (Rock Ver.)
- MENT #3
- "Angel"
- "Hurts"
- "Resolver"
- "On The Road"

Third video interlude

- "Venus"
- "Brand New"
- MENT #4
- "Once in a lifetime"
- "First Love"

Encore

- "I Pray 4 U"
- "RUN"
- "Yo!"

Closing

Last video interlude

== Tour dates ==
Date	City	Country	Venue	Attendance
16 March 2013	Seoul	South Korea	Olympic Gymnastics Arena	25,000
17 March 2013	Seoul	South Korea	Olympic Gymnastics Arena	25,000
8 June 2013	Hong Kong		AsiaWorld-Arena	11,000
22 June 2013	Shanghai	China	Mercedes-Benz Arena	15,000
6 July 2013	Taipei	Taiwan	Nankang 101	—
7 July 2013	Taipei	Taiwan	Nankang 101	—
13 July 2013	Tokyo	Japan	Makuhari Event Hall	20,000
14 July 2013	Tokyo	Japan	Makuhari Event Hall	20,000
15 July 2013	Tokyo	Japan	Makuhari Event Hall	20,000
20 July 2013	Beijing	China	MasterCard Center	—
3 August 2013	Seoul	South Korea	Olympic Gymnastics Arena	27,000
4 August 2013	Seoul	South Korea	Olympic Gymnastics Arena	27,000

== Personnel ==
- Vocals / dancer: Shinhwa
- Tour organizer: Shinhwa Company, Top Class Entertainment, Liveworks Company, TOP Media
- Tour promoter: CJ E&M (Seoul)
