= Kim Dong-wan =

South Korean singer and actor (born 1979)

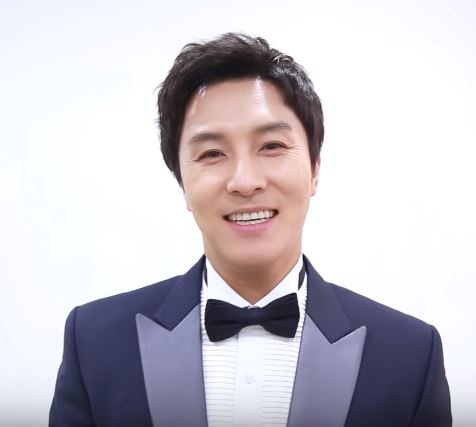
- Kim in 2018
- Born: November 21, 1979 (age 46); Seoul, South Korea
- Education: Whimoon High School
- Occupations: Singer; actor
- Musical career
- Genres: K-pop; J-pop; Dance
- Years active: 1998–present
- Labels: SM; Good; Liveworks Company; Universal D; Shinhwa Company; CI
- Member of: Shinhwa
- Website: Official website

Korean name
- Hangul: 김동완
- Hanja: 金烔完
- RR: Gim Dongwan
- MR: Kim Tongwan

Kim Dong-wan (Korean: 김동완; born November 21, 1979) is a South Korean entertainer, known as a member of South Korean boy band Shinhwa. He has been acting since 2002, and has starred in television dramas such as A Farewell to Sorrow and Children of Heaven. He has said that given the opportunity he would prefer a career in acting rather than as a singer, However, since the release of his debut album, he has stated that now he prefers singing more. From Shinhwa, Kim is the fourth member to go solo, following Lee Min-woo, Shin Hye-sung, and Jun Jin.

== Early life ==
Kim was a child actor and starred in several dramas as a teenager but opted not to pursue acting as a career. He later joined S.M. Entertainment as a trainee after being "streetcasted". He was educated in Whimoon High School.

== Career ==
=== 1998: Debut with Shinhwa ===
Kim made his debut in 1998 as a vocalist in the boy band Shinhwa. Although he is not the lead vocalist, he began singing bigger parts on Shinhwa's 7th album, Brand New. In one song from the album "Liar", Kim is the vocalist, and he is accompanied by Eric Mun's rapping. He also wrote, composed, and arranged a song on the album, titled "Set Free". Though he had branched out as a solo artist, he is part of Shinhwa and just released Shinhwa's 9th album.

Kim was one of several Korean celebrities praised by the Japanese media for giving generous donations for flood victims in 2006.

On April 16, 2007, Kim appeared as a guest on MC Mong's "Pleasure and Pain" radio show. When asked about an incident early in his career where he injured his nose, he confessed that he had undergone plastic surgery to change its shape.

=== 2007: Solo debut ===
Kim released his debut solo album, Kimdongwan Is, on July 5, 2007, which featured collaborations with his fellow Shinhwa members, including Lee Andy rapping in the song "Loving Summer", Shin Hye Sung singing a duet with Kim in "The One Left Alone", and Eric rapping in "My Love". The other members have contributed to the album as well, with Lee Min Woo writing, composing and arranging the song "My Love" and Jun Jin helping him with choreography. Kim expressed gratitude for their contributions, saying, "I've been working together with the group Shinhwa, thus there was a lot of pressure working on the solo album, but since the other members showed up and helped me with most of it, it has been a great big help for me". Kim's first single was the ballad, "Handkerchief", a song about a guy who consoles his girlfriend and wipes away her tears.

Despite Shinhwa's musical genre being predominantly American R&B and bubblegum pop, Kim said he wanted his album to be more J-pop influenced, having redone a song by GLAY×EXILE in the album. Lee Soo-man, founder of SM Entertainment, was an admirer of X Japan and instructed Kim to dress in X Japan-inspired makeup during the promotion appearances for the group's album T.O.P. in 1999. Kim later performed Yoshiki's composition "Say Anything" at his first solo concert in 2008.

For the debut album, Kim also lost a lot of weight, saying that "it's not good for a ballad singer to have a muscular image. Someone singing ballads should have a lean, 'hungry-looking' image." His album sold over 25,000 copies in two days, with 41,490 copies sold by the end of 2007; it was ranked 19th in album sales for the year. In 2008, he released his 2nd solo album, The Secret; Between Us. The album featured collaborations with Tiffany of SNSD, Jade Valerie, Shinhwa bandmate Eric, and Heritage.

=== 2008–2011: Military service and musical ===
Kim enlisted for mandatory military service in November 2008, at an army training camp in Gongju, South Chungcheong Province He was discharged on 17 December 2010, after serving 24 months as an administrative worker at the Seodaemun-gu District Office.

Upon being discharged Kim joined Shinhwa bandmate Shin Hye-sung at Liveworks Company and has since played the lead role of Hedwig in theatrical musical Hedwig and the Angry Inch at Sang Sang Art Hall in Seoul. In August 2011, Kim played the role of Korean independence activist, Lee Youk-sa in MBC two-part special drama, The Peak, also known as Life of Lee Youk-Sa, the Poet who Embraced Epoch. It was broadcast on Korea's Liberation Day, 15 August 2011. Lee Youk-sa was a poet during the Japanese Colonial Period who died in prison at the age of 40, leaving behind a collection of some 40 works of poetry.

=== 2012: Shinhwa comeback and acting ===
In March 2012, Kim reunited with his Shinhwa bandmates for their comeback after four years, under the management of 'Shinhwa Company'. It is a joint venture agency for members to perform as a group, of which Eric and Lee Min-woo are co-CEOs and the remaining members are shareholders. The Company manages the group as a whole, whilst members' individual activities are managed by their respective agencies. The group released their tenth studio album The Return on 23 March 2012, launched their comeback concerts 2012 Shinhwa Grand Tour: The Return throughout Asia and their first exclusive variety program Shinhwa Broadcast premiered on 17 March 2012 on cable channel JTBC.

In July, Kim co-starred with Kim Myung-min and Lee Hanee in thriller Deranged as Jae-pil, a detective agonized with guilt for squandering his brother's money in the stock market. In August, Kim was cast as the title role of Kim Tae-pyung in KBS' daily drama, Cheer Up, Mr. Kim!, about a male domestic cleaner and housekeeper, the guardian of three, later four, children, none of whom are his own. The series premiered in November and marked Kim's first television drama since Good Bye, Sadness in 2005. At the 2012 KBS Drama Awards, Kim received the Best Actor in Daily Drama award for his portrayal of Mr Kim.

== Philanthropy ==
In April 2015, after the earthquake in Nepal, Kim was reported to have donated ₩36,000,000 (equivalent to approximately $33,660 USD) towards the relief fund.

== Discography ==
=== Studio albums ===
Title	Album details	Peak chart positions	Sales
Title	Album details	KOR RIAK	Sales
Kimdongwan Is	Released: July 5, 2007 (SDL-0009); Repackaged: October 4, 2007 (SDL-0051); Label: H2 Entertainment; Format: CD	4	KOR: 41,490
The Secret	Released: May 13, 2008 (SDL-0111); Repackaged: July 22, 2008 (SDL-0140); Label: H2 Entertainment; Format: CD	2	KOR: 16,537

=== Compilation albums ===
Title	Album details	Peak chart positions	Sales
Title	Album details	JPN	Sales
Japan Premium Best	Released: December 15, 2010; Label: Tsubasa Records; Format: CD+DVD	57	

=== Video albums ===
Title	Details
Promise: The First Live Concert (약속: 첫번째 라이브 콘서트)	Released: June 18, 2009; Format: DVD

=== Extended plays ===
Title	Album details	Peak chart positions	Sales
Title	Album details	KOR	Sales
D	Released: October 21, 2015; Label: CI Entertainment; Format: CD, digital download	5	KOR: 11,580
W	Released: November 27, 2015; Label: CI Entertainment; Format: CD, digital download	6	KOR: 7,272
Trace of Emotion	Released: November 14, 2017; Label: CI Entertainment; Format: CD, digital download	9	KOR: 15,546
...LER	Released: January 21, 2020; Label: Office DH; Format: CD, digital download	3	KOR: 11,359

=== Singles ===
Title	Year	Peak chart positions		Album
Title	Year	KOR	JPN	Album
"Handkerchief" (손수건)	2007	—	—	Kimdongwan Is
"Men's Love" (남자의 사랑)	2008	—	—	The Secret
"The Secret" (비밀) (narr. by Tiffany Young)	2008	—	—	The Secret
"Promise" (약속) (with Younha)	2008	—	—	Non-album singles
"My Summer Girl"	2011	—	109	Non-album singles
"He_Sunshine"	2014	—	—	W
"He_Starlight" (feat. Jeon So-min)	2014	—	—	Non-album single
"I'm Fine"	2015	66	—	D
"Du Du Du"	2015	—	—	W
"After Image" (헤어지긴 한 걸까)	2017	—	—	Trace of Emotion
"The Reason the Earth is Pretty" (지구가 예쁜 이유)	2017	—	—	Non-album singles
"Neither Slumber Nor Sleep" (졸지도 않으시고)	2018	—	—	Non-album singles
"Red Shoes"	2020	—	—	...LER

== Filmography ==
=== Television dramas ===
- 2001 – Nonstop
- 2002 – Children of Heaven (KBS)
- 2005 – MBC Best Theater – "Magic Power Alcohol"
- 2005 – Beating Heart
- 2005 – A Farewell to Sorrow
- 2007 – The One I Love
- 2011 – The Peak
- 2012 – Cheer Up, Mr. Kim! (KBS)
- 2016 – Moorim School: Saga of the Brave
- 2017 – Drama Stage – The Picnic Day (TVN)
- 2019 – I Hate Going to Work (KBS2)
- 2025 - For Eagle Brothers (KBS2)

=== Film ===
- 2002 – Emergency Act 19 – cameo with Shinhwa
- 2004 – Spin Kick, aka Taekwon Boys
- 2012 – Deranged - as Jae-pil, an investigator and younger brother of Jae-hyuk, played by Kim Myung-min
- 2015 – Springtime Fantasy
- 2015 – Glory Day
- 2015 – The Megalomaniac
- 2021 – A Long Day
- 2022 – B Cut - as Seung Hyun
- 2022 – The Clown: The Singer as Fallen Yangban

=== Variety shows ===
- 2003 – Yoon Do-Hyun's Love Letter “Lately” – KBS
- 2004 – Yoon Do-Hyun's Love Letter “Cigarette Shop Girl” – KBS
- 2005 – Public Relations – Officer of JeonJu International Film Festival
- 2005 – Love Letter (ep 1 to 14) – SBS
- 2005 – X-Man – SBS
- 2006 – Heroine 6
- 2006 – New X-Man – SBS
- 2012–2013 – Shinhwa Broadcast (ep 1 - 49) - JTBC
- 2015 – I Live Alone (ep 99 - 150) - MBC
- 2015 – King of Mask Singer Contestant with the stage name "Holding the End of the Night" (Episode 29-30) - MBC
- 2018 – Worldwide Correspondence - TVN
- 2018 – Battle Trip - KBS
- 2018 – 2 Days & 1 Night - (ep 705 - 706) - KBS
- 2021 – Chosun Panstar - MBN (judge)

=== MC ===
- 2000–2002: DJ for Ten Ten Club
- 2003–2005: Host for SBS Inkigayo
- 2006: Host for SBS I Love My Teacher Day Concert
- 2018: Host for Worldwide Correspondence of TVN

== Stage ==
=== Musical ===
Musical performances
Year	Title		Role	Ref.
Year	English	Korean	Role	Ref.
2011	Hedwig	헤드윅	Hedwig	
2013	Le Passe Muraille /The Man Who Breaks Through Walls	벽을 뚫는 남자	Dutilleul	
2014	Hedwig	헤드윅	Hedwig	
2016	Edgar Allan Poe	에드거 앨런 포	Poe	
2017	Cyrano	시라노	Cyrano	
2018	Gentleman's Guide: Love and Murder	젠틀맨스 가이드: 사랑과 살인편	Monty Navarro	
2022	Something Rotten	썸씽로튼	Nick Bottom	
2022	Seopyeonje	서편제	Dong-ho	

=== Theater ===
Theater performances
Year	Title		Role	Theater	Date	Ref.
Year	English	Korean	Role	Theater	Date	Ref.
2020	Theatrical Battle 8 - Lungs	연극열전8 - 렁스	M	Art One Theater Hall 2	March 9 to July 5	

== Awards and nominations ==
Year	Awards	Category	Work	Result	Ref
2004	25th Blue Dragon Film Awards	Best New Actor	Spin Kick	Nominated	
2005	KBS Drama Awards	Best New Actor	A Farewell to Sorrow	Won	
2005	KBS Drama Awards	Best Couple	A Farewell to Sorrow	Nominated	
2007	SBS Inkigayo	Mutizen Award	Handkerchief	Won	
2007	Mnet Asian Music Awards	Best Ballad Performance	Handkerchief	Nominated	
2012	KBS Drama Awards	Excellence Award, Actor in a Daily Drama	Cheer Up, Mr. Kim!	Won	
2013	49th Baeksang Arts Awards	Most Popular Actor (Film)	Deranged	Won	
2013	6th Korea Drama Awards	Excellence Award, Actor	Cheer Up, Mr. Kim!	Won	
2015	SBS M The Show	The Show Choice winners	I'm Fine	Won	
2015	MBC Entertainment Awards	Excellence Award, Variety Show	I Live Alone	Won	
2025	KBS Drama Awards	Best Supporting Actor	For Eagle Brothers	Won	
