= My Spring Days =

- Promotional poster for My Spring Days
- Also known as: The Spring Days of My Life; Springtime of My Life; The Spring of My Life
- Genre: Melodrama; Romance; Family drama
- Written by: Park Ji-sook
- Directed by: Lee Jae-dong
- Starring: Kam Woo-sung; Choi Soo-young; Lee Joon-hyuk; Jang Shin-young
- Country of origin: South Korea
- Original language: Korean
- No. of episodes: 16

Production
- Executive producer: Han Hee
- Producers: Lee Ho-young; Park Jae-sam
- Running time: 60 minutes
- Production companies: Celltrion Entertainment (formerly Dream E&M); Hunus Entertainment

Original release
- Network: Munhwa Broadcasting Corporation
- Release: September 10 – October 30, 2014

My Spring Days (Korean: 내 생애 봄날; RR: Nae saengae bomnal; lit. 'The Spring Days of My Life') is a 2014 South Korean television series starring Kam Woo-sung, Choi Soo-young, Lee Joon-hyuk, and Jang Shin-young. It airs on MBC on for 16 episodes beginning September 10, 2014.

The plot uses the concept of cellular memory, a medical hypothesis that recipients' personalities and habits become similar to their donors.

== Plot ==
Lee Bom-yi (Choi Soo-young) was once a terminally ill patient, but she's been given a second chance at life after getting a heart transplant and now lives each day to the fullest. She meets Kang Dong-ha (Kam Woo-sung), the CEO of Hanuiron and a widower with two children who lost his wife to an accident. Bom-yi falls for Dong-ha, not knowing that her donor was Dong-ha's wife.

== Cast ==
=== Main characters ===
- Kam Woo-sung as Kang Dong-ha
- Choi Soo-young as Lee Bom-yi
- Lee Joon-hyuk as Kang Dong-wook
- Jang Shin-young as Bae Ji-won

=== Supporting characters ===
- Shim Hye-jin as Jo Myung-hee
- Kwon Hae-hyo as Lee Hyuk-soo
- Lee Ki-young as Song Byung-gil
- Ga Deuk-hee as Joo Se-na
- Jung Ji-so as Kang Poo-reum
  - Shin Rin-ah as young Kang Poo-Reum
- Gil Jung-woo as Kang Ba-da
- Min Ji-ah as Yoon Soo-jung
- Lee Jae-won as Park Hyung-woo
- Kang Boo-ja as Na Hyun-soon
- Jo Yang-ja as Choi Bok-hee
- Jang Won-young as Jo Gil-dong
- Hwang Geum-hee

== Production ==
Kam Woo-sung and Choi Soo-young were cast as leads on July 17, 2014.

My Spring Days began filming on August 19 and the first shoot took place in a marketplace in Suwon, Gyeonggi Province.

== Ratings ==
The show beat its rivals, SBS My Lovely Girl and KBS2's Iron Man consistently and the show ended with a 10.5% viewer rating in the Seoul National Capital Area, ranking first among the Wednesday-Thursday dramas.

Episode #	Original broadcast date	Average audience share			
Episode #	Original broadcast date	TNmS Ratings		AGB Nielsen	
Episode #	Original broadcast date	Nationwide	Seoul National Capital Area	Nationwide	Seoul National Capital Area
1	September 10, 2014	7.5%	8.8%	8.1%	9.8%
2	September 11, 2014	8.3%	10.7%	8.7%	10.4%
3	September 17, 2014	8.2%	10.4%	9.5%	10.5%
4	September 18, 2014	8.1%	10.3%	11.1%	13.3%
5	September 24, 2014	8.7%	11.4%	9.3%	10.0%
6	September 25, 2014	7.7%	10.3%	9.2%	11.0%
7	October 1, 2014	7.8%	11.0%	8.3%	9.5%
8	October 2, 2014	6.3%	8.5%	8.8%	10.1%
9	October 8, 2014	7.6%	10.0%	9.1%	10.3%
10	October 9, 2014	7.7%	10.7%	8.3%	9.3%
11	October 15, 2014	8.3%	11.4%	8.6%	10.0%
12	October 16, 2014	7.5%	9.5%	8.5%	9.4%
13	October 22, 2014	9.3%	11.8%	10.6%	12.2%
14	October 23, 2014	8.9%	12.2%	9.6%	11.2%
15	October 29, 2014	8.3%	11.3%	8.7%	9.9%
16	October 30, 2014	8.1%	10.8%	10.0%	11.1%
Average		8.0%	10.6%	9.2%	10.5%

== Awards and nominations ==
Year	Award	Category	Recipient	Result
2014	MBC Drama Awards	Top Excellence Award, Actor in a Miniseries	Kam Woo-sung	Nominated
2014	MBC Drama Awards	Excellence Award, Actress in a Miniseries	Choi Soo-young	Won
2014	MBC Drama Awards	Excellence Award, Actress in a Miniseries	Jang Shin-young	Nominated
2014	MBC Drama Awards	Best New Actress	Choi Soo-young	Nominated
2015	8th Korea Drama Awards	Excellence Award, Actress	Choi Soo-young	Won

== See also ==
- Summer Scent
