= If You Wish Upon Me =

2022 South Korean television series

- Promotional poster
- Also known as: If You Say Your Wish; Tell Me Your Wish
- Hangul: 당신의 소원을 말하면
- RR: Dangsinui sowoneul malhamyeon
- MR: Tangsinŭi sowŏnŭl marhamyŏn
- Genre: Humanism
- Written by: Jo Ryeong-soo
- Directed by: Kim Yong-wan
- Starring: Ji Chang-wook; Sung Dong-il; Choi Soo-young
- Music by: Kim Dong-wook
- Country of origin: South Korea
- Original language: Korean
- No. of episodes: 16

Production
- Executive producers: Park Ki-ho; Yoo Yu-jin
- Producers: Kim Hae-jeong; Byun Seung-min
- Production companies: A&E Networks Korea (investment); Climax Studio
- Budget: ₩10 billion

Original release
- Network: KBS2
- Release: August 10 – September 29, 2022

If You Wish Upon Me (Korean: 당신이 소원을 말하면) is a 2022 South Korean television series starring Ji Chang-wook, Sung Dong-il, and Choi Soo-young. It aired on KBS2 from August 10 to September 29, 2022, airing every Wednesday and Thursday at 21:50 (KST) for 16 episodes. It is also available for streaming on Viu in the Middle East, South Africa, and selected regions in Asia, and on Viki in the Americas, Europe, and Oceania.

== Overview ==
The storyline of If You Wish Upon Me was inspired by a true account of the Make-a-Wish Foundation in the Netherlands. The story revolves around a young man (Ji Chang-wook) with a troubled past who struggles throughout his life that enters a hospice hospital on the order of community service. He joins Team Genie, a group which fulfills the last wishes of hospice patients, and learns to care for others for the first time. He, with Team Genie, listens to and carries out the last wishes of people at the end of their lives through various episodes.

== Cast ==
=== Main ===
- Ji Chang-wook as Yoon Gyeo-ree

A young ex-convict who volunteers at a hospice hospital after going through an orphanage, a juvenile detention center, and a prison.

- Sung Dong-il as Kang Tae-shik

The leader of volunteer group, Team Genie, who grants the last wishes of hospice hospital patients.

- Choi Soo-young as Seo Yeon-joo

A nurse at hospice hospital with a bright cheerful personality.

=== Supporting ===
==== People related to Team Genie ====
- Yang Hee-kyung as Yeom Soon-ja

A cook and member of the volunteer group, Team Genie.

- Gil Hae-yeon as Choi Deok-ja

A cleaner at the hospice and a member of Team Genie.

- Yoo Soon-woong as Hwang Cha-young

A silent and sincere man who works with Choi Deok-ja.

- Jeon Chae-eun as Yoo Seo-jin

A high school student and the only teen member of Team Genie.

- Park Jung-pyo as Mr.Koo

A social worker and a trusted sponsor of Team Genie.

- Shin Joo-hwan as Yang Chi-hoon

A doctor at the hospice.

==== People related to Yoon Gyeo-ree ====
- Won Ji-an as Ha Joon-kyung

A woman whose everything is Yoon Gyeo-ree.

- Nam Tae-hoon as Jang Seok-jun

A person from the same orphanage as Yoon Gyeo-ree.

- Park Se-jun as Wang Jin-goo

A friend of Yoon Gyeo-ree, a veterinarian.

==== Others ====
- Park Jin-joo as Im Se-hee

The youngest patient in the hospice, a musical actress.

- Nam Kyung-joo as Yoon Ki-chun

Patient in room 403 and Yoon Gyeo-ree's father.

- Jung Dong-hwan as Mr. Yoon

A terminal ill patient at the hospice.

- Jeon Moo-song as Mr. Byun

A terminal ill patient at the hospice.

- Yeo One as Kwak Hyeong-jun

Yoo Seo-jin's boyfriend who got into a car accident.

- Park Jung-yeon as Choi Min-kyung

Cousin of Jae-yeon and Ho-yeon, granddaughter of grandma in Nursing Home Hospital No. 102.

- Jang Jae-hee as Jae-yeon

Granddaughter of grandma in Nursing Home Hospital No. 102.

- Lee Chul-mu as Ho-yeon

Grandson of grandma in Nursing Home Hospital No. 102.

=== Special appearances ===
- Kim Shin-rok as Hye-jin
- Min Woo-hyuk as Pyo Gyu-tae, Musical theater actor
- Lee Yoo-mi as young woman
- Lee Hyo-bin as Pyo Cheol-woo's victim

== Original soundtrack ==
=== Part 1 ===
Released on August 10, 2022
No.	Title	Lyrics	Music	Artist	Length
1.	"Loner"	Sooyoon; Kim Yong-shin	Moon Kim; Jung Yoon	Kim Sung-kyu (Infinite)	3:39
2.	"Loner" (Inst.)		Moon Kim; Jung Yoon		3:39
Total length:					7:18

=== Part 2 ===
Released on August 17, 2022
No.	Title	Lyrics	Music	Artist	Length
1.	"Starlight"	Maxx Song; Kriz	Maxx Song; Dr. Ahn; Kriz; Youngwoo	Jeong So-yeon (Laboum)	3:18
2.	"Starlight" (Inst.)		Maxx Song; Dr. Ahn; Kriz; Youngwoo		3:18
Total length:					6:36

=== Part 3 ===
Released on August 18, 2022
No.	Title	Lyrics	Music	Artist	Length
1.	"I Can't Forget You" (난, 너를)	Lee Ki-hwan	Lee Ki-hwan	Kim Feel	3:38
2.	"I Can't Forget You" (난, 너를; Inst.)		Lee Ki-hwan		3:38
Total length:					7:16

=== Part 4 ===
Released on August 24, 2022
No.	Title	Lyrics	Music	Artist	Length
1.	"Young Day" (어린 날)	Min	Min; Yountoven; Potato	Lee Ye-joon	4:11
2.	"Young Day" (어린 날; Inst.)		Min; Yountoven; Potato		4:11
Total length:					8:22

=== Part 5 ===
Released on August 31, 2022
No.	Title	Lyrics	Music	Artist	Length
1.	"Halo" (내일로)	Park Yu-rim (Pnp); Kim Hye-jeong (Pnp)	Isa Tengblad; Emma Aniela Eklund; Jim Bergsted (Tabago); Helge Reinsnes Moen (Tobago)	Park Jin-joo	2:40
2.	"Halo" (내일로; Inst.)		Isa Tengblad; Emma Aniela Eklund; Jim Bergsted (Tabago); Helge Reinsnes Moen (Tobago)		2:40
Total length:					5:20

=== Part 6 ===
Released on September 7, 2022
No.	Title	Lyrics	Music	Artist	Length
1.	"I'll Protect You" (나의 품에 숨겨줄게)	Park Kang-il	Park Kang-il; Kim Gyu-beom	Choi Yu-ree	3:54
2.	"I'll Protect You" (나의 품에 숨겨줄게; Inst.)		Park Kang-il; Kim Gyu-beom		3:54
Total length:					7:48

=== Part 7 ===
Released on September 14, 2022
No.	Title	Lyrics	Music	Artist	Length
1.	"Let U Go"	Anne (Anne Story Company); Nam Hee-yoon (Anne Story Company)	Anne (Anne Story Company); Krysta Youngs; Jay Hong	Suran	4:17
2.	"Let U Go" (Inst.)		Anne (Anne Story Company); Krysta Youngs; Jay Hong		4:17
Total length:					8:34

=== Part 8 ===
Released on September 15, 2022
No.	Title	Lyrics	Music	Artist	Length
1.	"To My Star" (나의 별에게)	Lee Ki-hwan; Eun-rim	Lee Ki-hwan; Eun-rim; Mr Moon	Choi Soo-young	3:48
2.	"To My Star" (나의 별에게; Inst.)		Lee Ki-hwan; Eun-rim; Mr Moon		3:48
Total length:					7:36

=== Part 9 ===
Released on September 22, 2022
No.	Title	Lyrics	Music	Artist	Length
1.	"You and Me" (너와 나 사이)	Noheul	Noheul	Taeyeon	3:22
2.	"You and Me" (너와 나 사이; Inst.)		Noheul		3:22
Total length:					6:44

== Production ==
On September 1, 2021, it was reported that the main casting had been finalised. The filming began on September 27. On April 7, 2022, Choi Soo-young posted on Instagram that the filming of the series had ended.

== Viewership ==
Average TV viewership ratings
Ep.	Original broadcast date	Average audience share
Ep.	Original broadcast date	Nielsen Korea (Nationwide)
1	August 10, 2022	3.6% (18th)
2	August 11, 2022	3.0% (25th)
3	August 17, 2022	2.2% (29th)
4	August 18, 2022	1.9% (34th)
5	August 24, 2022	2.9% (24th)
6	August 25, 2022	2.4% (27th)
7	August 31, 2022	2.3% (28th)
8	September 1, 2022	2.4% (27th)
9	September 7, 2022	2.2% (30th)
10	September 8, 2022	2.5% (26th)
11	September 14, 2022	2.0% (31st)
12	September 15, 2022	2.1% (29th)
13	September 21, 2022	1.7% (34th)
14	September 22, 2022	1.6% (37th)
15	September 28, 2022	1.8% (35th)
16	September 29, 2022	2.0% (30th)
Average		2.3%
In the table above, the blue numbers represent the lowest published ratings and the red numbers represent the highest published ratings.
