= Jeon Chae-eun =

South Korean actress (born 2005)

- Born: October 15, 2005 (age 19); Namyangju, South Korea
- Occupation: Actress
- Years active: 2020–present
- Agent: Saram Entertainment

Korean name
- Hangul: 전채은
- Hanja: 全蔡誾
- RR: Jeon Chaeeun
- MR: Chŏn Ch'aeŭn

Jeon Chae-eun (Korean: 전채은; born October 15, 2005) is a South Korean actress. She first gained recognition through the 2021 television series The Devil Judge.

== Career ==
Jeon Chae-eun began to have an interest in acting when she was in elementary school, after she was cast as the protagonist Anne in the musical theatre Anne of Green Gables produced by a local troupe. She debuted with the 2020 indie film Stone Skipping, as a runaway girl living in shelter.

Jeon gained her first recognition from her television series debut role, as the protagonist's disabled but genius teenage niece in the 2021 tvN's legal thriller The Devil Judge.

In 2022 Jeon has been cast in two series, KBS2's human melodrama If You Wish Upon Me as the only high school volunteer at a hospice and tvN's family mystery Little Women as the daughter of a prestigious family.

== Filmography ==
=== Film ===
| Year | Title | Role | Ref. |
|---|---|---|---|
| 2020 | Stone Skipping | Jang Eun-ji | |

=== Television series ===
| Year | Title | Role | Notes | Ref. |
|---|---|---|---|---|
| 2021 | The Devil Judge | Kang Elijah | | |
| 2022 | Today's Webtoon | Ma Yu-na | Cameo (episode 9) | |
| 2022 | If You Wish Upon Me | Yoo Seo-jin | | |
| 2022 | Little Women | Park Hyo-rin | | |
| 2025 | Way Back Love | Jeong Hee-joo | | |

== Musical theatre ==
| Year | Title | Role | Ref. |
|---|---|---|---|
| 2016 | Anne of Green Gables | Anne | |
