= Jun Jin =

South Korean singer and television personality (born 1980)

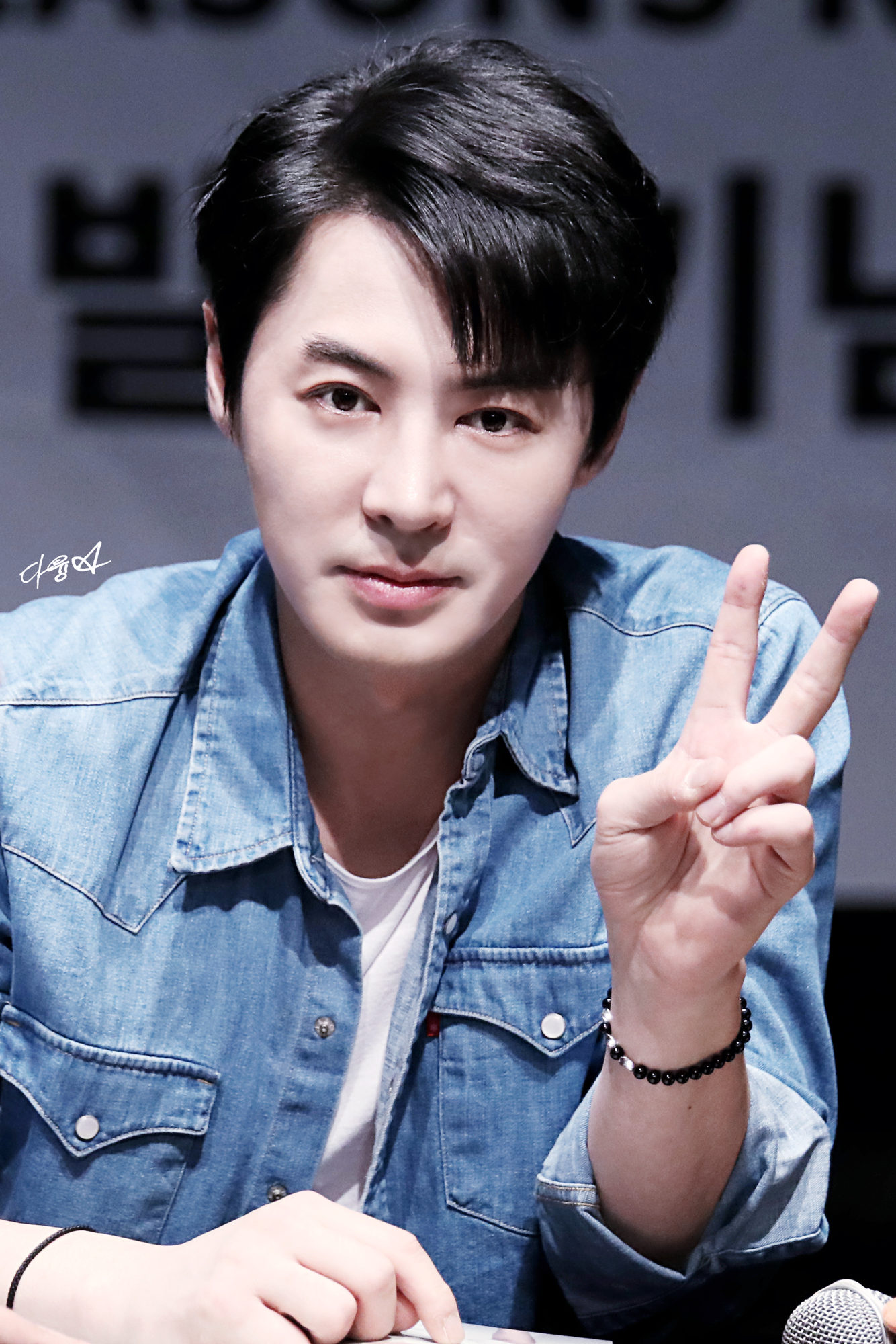
- Jun Jin at a fansigning event in July 2018

Background information
- Born: Park Choong-jae; August 19, 1980 (age 45); Seoul, South Korea
- Genres: K-pop; J-pop; dance
- Occupations: Singer; dancer; actor; host
- Instruments: Vocals; guitar; piano; drums
- Years active: 1998–present
- Labels: SM; Good; Open World; Day Dream; CI; Shinhwa Company
- Member of: Shinhwa
- Website: http://www.shinhwacompany.co.kr/
- Spouse: Ryu Yi-seo (m. 2020)

Korean name
- Hangul: 박충재
- Hanja: 朴忠裁
- RR: Bak Chungjae
- MR: Pak Ch'ungjae

Stage name
- Hangul: 전진
- Hanja: 前進
- RR: Jeon Jin
- MR: Chŏn Chin

Park Choong-jae (Korean: 박충재; born August 19, 1980), known professionally as Jun Jin, is a South Korean singer, actor and entertainer, known as a member and rapper of six-member boy band Shinhwa. He debuted as a dancer and rapper in Shinhwa in 1998 but started singing small parts in 2002; the release of Shinhwa's fifth album. He debuted as a solo artist in November 2006 with the single Love Doesn't Come.

== Early life ==
Jun Jin was the first-born child of singer Charlie Park (찰리박), also known as Park Young-chul (박영철), who debuted with a solo album Casanova Sarang in 2004. Jun Jin was born out of wedlock and due to strong opposition from his maternal family, Jun Jin's mother and father split, leaving Jun Jin to be raised by his grandmother.

== Career ==
=== 1998: Debut with Shinhwa ===
Backed by his high school friend, An Chil-hyun, Jun Jin was able to make it through the audition as a member for Shinhwa. He debuted with them as a rapper, alongside Eric Mun and Andy Lee. However, in the release of Shinhwa's fifth album Perfect Man, he began singing small parts. He would still continue to sing small parts with the release of Shinhwa's later albums until the band switched to a different label, Good Entertainment. Under Good Entertainment, Jun Jin advanced further, singing a solo song entitled "Painfully Loving You." Jun Jin soon released a single, "Sarangee Ohji Anayo" (Love Doesn't Come), thus starting his solo career.

Jun Jin starred in the hit 2004 KBS drama Forbidden Love in 2004, alongside popular actress Kim Tae-hee. He also starred in various other Banjun Dramas as well. In 2009, he and the other members of Infinite Challenge appeared in an episode of MBC drama Queen of Housewives.

=== 2006–2007: Solo artist ===
Jun Jin released his first single in November 2006 titled "사랑이 오지 않아요" (translated to "Love Doesn't Come"), with a total of five songs, including the title song and its instrumental. Surprisingly, he decided to go into ballad even though he is known for his strong dance skills. However, this is because ballads are popular in Korea right now; dance artists such as Baek Ji-young and even Jun Jin's own group Shinhwa have released ballads for their lead singles as well. The single did fairly well on the chart, though not a major hit. In December 2006, Jun Jin was hospitalised; although recommended to stay in the hospital, he quickly left and returned to his promotional schedule.

In January 2007, Jun Jin took part in the Hallyu Festival in Osaka which also featured bandmate Lee Min-woo, Kangta of H.O.T, SG Wannabe and actor Song Seung-heon at the Osaka Dome.

In early January 2007, Jun Jin filmed a music video with Taiwanese singer Linda Liao. The music video was by the Korean group, The Name, titled "It Could Be Love." He later recorded a duet with Lao, entitled "Forever" and also has a version in Mandarin. He later released a repackage version of "Love Doesn't Come," which included the duet with Lao. The repackage version fared better in sales, selling 44,724 at the end of 2007. In mid-2007, Jun Jin left his group's management company and set up his own call JF Story Entertainment to concentrate on his solo career more. But has since been managed by Open World Entertainment.

=== 2008–2011: Television and military service ===
He released his first full-length solo album on 25 April 2008. Titled New Decade, the first single from the album was "Wa". The single encountered controversy when the music video was given a 19+ rating due to sexual content, in effect banning the video from major networks. On 26 April, Jun Jin held his first solo concert at Shibuya Public Hall, Tokyo. An extra show was added when the 2,500 tickets sold out in five minutes.

Jun Jin appeared in a variety programme, Infinite Challenge firstly in April 2008 as a replacement for Haha, officially known as 'the 7th member' in June 2008. Later he joined We Got Married in early 2009 with actress Lee Si-young as his "wife". The couple was dubbed "Gundam Couple" due to Lee Si-young's obsession with Gundam. They officially departed from the show on May 3, 2009 due to the restructuring of the show's format.

He later released a mini album, titled Fascination. The title-track "Hey Ya" featuring Son Dam-bi and Big Tone did fairly well on the charts but a track on the mini album titled "Like A Fool" featuring his "wife" Lee Si-young managed to fare better on the charts. The album was a mild success.

Jun Jin enlisted for mandatory military service on 22 October 2009 as a public service worker after enduring four weeks of basic training at Nonsan military camp in South Chungcheong Province. He was discharged on 14 November 2011, after working at the Gangnam Management Corporation, managing the culture center's fitness club and parking lot. He then participated at his agency's 1st Open World Festival Tokyo on 26 November. Since being discharged he held the Jun Jin: The singer's Christmas Day fan meeting in Taipei on 25 December 2011.

=== 2012: Shinhwa comeback ===
In March 2012, Jun Jin played the male lead in the music video of "U.F.O" by girl group Stellar, who is produced by bandmate Eric, under his agency Top Class Entertainment.

In March 2012, Jun Jin made a group comeback with his Shinhwa bandmates after four years, under the management of 'Shinhwa Company'. It is a joint venture agency for members to perform as a group, of which Eric and Lee Min-woo are co-CEOs and the remaining members are shareholders. The Company manages the group as a whole, whilst members' individual activities are managed by their respective agencies. The group released their tenth studio album The Return on 23 March 2012, launched their comeback concerts 2012 Shinhwa Grand Tour: The Return throughout Asia and their first exclusive variety program Shinhwa Broadcast premiered on 17 March 2012 on cable channel JTBC.

As of 26 June, Jun Jin has reportedly left Open World Entertainment. Ahead of 2012 Shinhwa Grand Tour in Guangzhou: The Return on 30 June, he had microscopic nerve decompression surgery on a lumbar disc from chronic back pain. His condition had deteriorated despite being medicated since their comeback leading him to seek medical advice and subsequent surgery. He has been advised rest and physical therapy for the next six weeks, but will continue with the tour till its conclusion. Due to the surgery he was absent from the recording of episode 17, "School Channel: God of Classroom", of Shinhwa Broadcast aired on 7 July 2012. Also, still recovering from surgery, he did not take part in some of the dance numbers in both the Guangzhou and final concert in Beijing.

=== 2013: Shinhwa Comeback ===
On February 8, 2013, Shinhwa's agency announced the legendary group's comeback through their official website. The poster for their comeback, 2013 Shinhwa Grand Tour: The Classic commemorates the group's 15 years since their debut was revealed. The album's name called The Classic.

=== 2014: Shinhwa 16th anniversary ===
Jun Jin participated in the Shinhwa 16th Anniversary Concert along with other Shinhwa members in Olympic Gymnastics Arena. The concert was held for two days: 22 and 23 March and Jun Jin said he will consider to record a new solo album in that year.

== Discography ==
=== Studio albums ===
Title	Album details	Peak chart positions	Sales
Title	Album details	KOR RIAK	Sales
New Decade (Repackage: Together 4 Ever)	Released: April 25, 2008 (OWC-012); Repackage: August 21, 2008 (OWC-014); Label: Open World Entertainment; Format: CD; Track listing New Decade: 1. "Intro"; 2. "Wa" (feat. Joo Hee & Bigtone of Bless One); 3. "아픈사랑" (Lovesick); 4. "한걸음" (Step); 5. "For You"; 6. "좋은 사람" (Good Person); 7. "귀여워요" (Cute); 8. "Fancy Lounge"; 9. "천번이라도T" (Even Thousands of Times); 10. "Wa" (Instrumental); 11. "Epilogue"; Together 4 Ever: 1. "Together 4ever" 2. "아픈사랑" (Lovesick); 3. "사랑한다는 그 말" (feat. Eric Mun); 4. "한걸음" (Step); 5. "For You" (feat. Lee Ji-hoon); 6. "좋은 사람" (Good Person) (feat. Kang Jin-woo); 7. "귀여워요" (Cute) (feat. Joo Hee); 8. "Fancy Lounge"; 9. "천번이라도" (Even Thousands of Times); 10. "J J Go Go"; 11. "Wa" (feat. Joo Hee & Bigtone of Bless One); 12. "Epilogue" (사랑 그대로의 사랑)	5	KOR: 20,000

=== EPs ===
Title	Album details	Peak chart positions	Sales
Title	Album details	KOR Gaon	Sales
Fascination	Released: May 7, 2009 (L200000765); Label: Open World Entertainment; Format: CD, digital download; Track listing: 1. "바보처럼" (Like a Fool) (feat. PS Jun & Lee Si-young); 2. "Hey Ya!" (feat. Big Tone & Son Dam-bi); 3. "Happy Ending" (feat. Kim Hee-sun & Kang Jin-woo); 4. "날 사랑해라..." (Make Love With Me...); 5. "사랑하지 않아요" (I Don't Love)	32	
#Real# (Repackage: #Real# in LA)	Released: 7 September 2015 (L200001152); Repackage: 3 December 2015 (L200001191); Label: Daydream Entertainment; Format: CD, digital download; Track listing #Real#: 1. "60 Seconds"; 2. "Wow Wow Wow" (feat. Eric Mun); 3. "On My Own"; 4. "You"; 5. "You're The Only One I Need" (너만 있으면 돼); #Real# in LA: 1. "60 Seconds" (feat. Eric Mun); 2. "Love My Life"; 3. "On My Own"; 4. "You"; 5. "You're The Only One I Need" (너만 있으면 돼); 6. "Wow Wow Wow (Freakhouze Remix)"	4	KOR: 22,832

=== Single albums ===
Title	Album details	Peak chart positions		Sales
Title	Album details	KOR RIAK	KOR Gaon	Sales
Love Doesn't Come (사랑이 오지 않아요) (Repackage: Forever)	Released: November 16, 2006 (IDCD-6002); Repackaged: February 16, 2007(VDCD-6016); Label: Good Entertainment; Format: CD; Track listing Love Doesn't Come: 1. "사랑이 오지 않아요" (Love Doesn't Come); 2. "천번이라도" (A Thousand Times); 3. "돌아와줘" (Come Back); 4. "사랑이 오지 않아요" (instrumental); CD+DVD track listing: CD: 1. "Forever" (duet with Linda Liao) (Korean ver.); 2. "사랑이 오지 않아요" (Love Doesn't Come); 3. "천번이라도" (A Thousand Times); 4. "돌아와줘" (Come Back); DVD: 1. "사랑이 오지 않아요" music video 2. "사랑이 오지 않아요" making story 3. Jun Jin, Linda love story 4. JJ in Singapore; 5. JJ in 2006 story 6. JJ in recording room; Forever Special Edition: 1. "Forever" (duet with Linda Liao) (Korean ver.); 2. "Forever" (duet with Linda Liao) (Chinese ver.); 3. "사랑이 오지 않아요" (Love Doesn't Come); 4. "천번이라도" (A Thousand Times); 5. "돌아와줘" (Come Back); 6. "Forever" (Instrumental)	6	—	KOR: 44,724
The Seasons Revolve: Summer	Released: June 28, 2018; Label: CI Ent; Format: CD, digital download	—N/a	11	KOR: 4,120

=== Video albums ===
Title	Details	Track listing
Last Concert 2009: Asia Tour in Seoul	Released: April 16, 2010; Label: Open World Entertainment; Format: DVD	CD track listing: 1. Intro; 2. 천 번 이라도; 3. 아픈 사랑; 4. 귀여워요; 5. 바보처럼; 6. 사랑하지 않아요; 7. Forever; 8. 돌아와 줘 9. Together 4 Ever; 10. 사랑한다는 그 말 11. 그 아픔까지 사랑한거야; 12. For You; 13. Fancy Lounge; 14. Happy Ending; 15. Hey Ya; 16. 날 사랑해라; 17. 으쌰! 으쌰! (With Lee Min-woo); 18. Wa; 19. 사랑이 오지 않아요

== Filmography ==
=== Film ===
Year	Title	Hangul	Notes
2002	Emergency Act 19	긴급조치 19호	with Shinhwa

=== Television series ===
- 2003 - Nonstop 4
- 2004 - Forbidden Love
- 2005 - Let's Go To The Beach
- 2005 - Banjun Drama
- 2008 - Here He Comes
- 2008 - You Are My Dreams
- 2009 - MBC Best Theater: That Person is Coming

=== Television shows ===
Year	Title	Role	Notes
1999–2003	Dream Team season 1		Sports variety program
2004–2005	Love Letter	Contestant with Shinhwa	(Season 1, Episode 1-14)
2006	Shoot Dori Season 1		(Episode 24 – 38)
2008	Infinite Challenge	Main Cast	Jun Jin appeared on the show to replace Ha Ha. (June 2008 – November 2009)
2008	Reality show: Jun Jin's Girl	Host	(August 6, 2008 – October 29, 2008)
2009	We Got Married	Regular Cast	Jun Jin was paired with Lee Si-young (Season 1, Episode 42 45-55)
2012–2014	Shinhwa Broadcast	Main Cast with Shinhwa	(Episode 1-70)
2017	Radio Star	Special Host	(Episode 536)
2019	Gogu Chart	Main Host	(Episode 1-18)
2020	Earth Defense Forces	Main Cast	ongoing
	Same Bed Different Dreams 2	Cast Member	(Episode 165 - present)
2021	Soo Mi's Mountain Cabin	Cast Member	
2021	Law of the Jungle – Pent Island: Island of Desire	Cast Member	
2021	Home shopping	Home Shopping Studio	
2021	Cooking - The Birth of a Cooking King	Contestant	
2021	Altoran	Host	Episode 363–present
2022	House Reversal	Cast Member	
2022	Open Run	Host	
2023	Couple Athlete's Village	Cast Member	with Ryu Yi-seo

=== Awards ===
- Best Star award at the 2008 MBC Entertainment Awards -Infinite Challenge
- Hot Character Star: Jun Jin in Mnet 20's Choice Awards 2008
- 14th SBS Entertainment Awards Best Teamwork Award Same Bed, Different Dreams 2: You Are My Destiny

== Notes ==
- A The Gaon Music Chart began releasing data in 2010 after the Music Industry Association of Korea stopped compiling data in 2008. Online sources for charts after September 2008 and before January 2010 are currently unavailable.
