= Grand Tour: The Return =

2012 concert tour by Shinhwa

2012 Shinhwa Grand Tour: The Return
- Asia tour by Shinhwa
- Promotional poster
- Location: Asia
- Associated album: The Return
- Start date: 24 March 2012
- End date: 7 July 2012
- No. of shows: 10
- Box office: ₩2 billion (Seoul)
- Website: www.shinhwacompany.co.kr

Shinhwa concert chronology
- Shinhwa Must Go On: 10th Anniversary Live (2008); 2012 Shinhwa Grand Tour: The Return (2012); 2013 Shinhwa Grand Tour: The Classic (2013)

2012 Shinhwa Grand Tour: The Return is the Asia-wide live concert tour of South Korean boy band Shinhwa to support their tenth studio album, The Return, which was released on 23 March 2012. The album and tour marks Shinhwa's comeback to the music industry after a four-year hiatus, since their 10th anniversary concert held in 2008, during which band members served individual mandatory military services.

The tour commenced with two shows in Seoul in March 2012, marking the 14th anniversary of the group on 24 March. The tour continued, at the conclusion of promotional activities in Korea, with three shows in Japan, three in China, one in Taiwan and one in Singapore between the end of April and July. In total 10 shows in eight cities and five countries.

== Concerts ==
The 20,000 tickets for the Seoul concerts were sold out within 40 minutes of going on sale on 13 February, which amounted up to a gross of ₩2 billion. During the Seoul concerts, the group was unable to use special effects because of the 2012 Nuclear Security Summit, held at the COEX Convention & Exhibition Center in neighbouring Samseong-dong, Gangnam-gu, which has banned the use of explosives including fireworks.

At the start of the encore performance of "Oh!" of the second show, Shin Hye-sung dislocated his right knee, and was rushed to the emergency room before the end of the concert. He was shot up on stage but did not land properly, rupturing the cruciate ligament and severely damaged the cartilage and ligament surrounding the meniscus, requiring surgery and six months of rest. Shin had previously ruptured his cruciate ligament sustained during a concert in 2001, and had corrective surgery on his left knee but the cruciate ligament in his right knee continued to suffer damage. However he has put off surgery, but with continue treatment, till the end of promotional activities for the tenth album, The Return.

Shinhwa's concert in Japan marks their first concert in the country in more than four years. The Singapore leg of the tour marks the first time they have performed there in six years and was played to an audience of 5,000 people.

Ahead of the concert in Guangzhou, Jun Jin had microscopic nerve decompression surgery on a lumbar disc from chronic back pain. His condition had deteriorated despite being medicated since their comeback leading him to seek medical advice and subsequent surgery. He has been advised to rest and go through physical therapy for six weeks, but will continue with the tour till its conclusion. The concert in Guangzhou also marks the first time in their career, they had performed in the city. Which included an audience of 8,000 people. Jun Jin, still recovering from surgery, did not take part in some of the dance numbers in both the Guangzhou and final concert in Beijing. Which also included an audience of 8,000 people, as well as a celebration ahead of Lee Min-woo's birthday on 28 July.

== Setlist ==
Seoul, South Korea (opening weekend)

NB: songs not in performance order. Set-list: 210 minutes

- Intro
- "T.O.P"
- "Hey, Come On"
- Opening Ment
- "One More Time" (다시 한 번만)
- "Destiny of Love"
- VCR "신화의 토크 타임 No.1"
- "Wild Eyes"
- "Perfect Man"
- Talk
- "Time Machine"
- "How Do I Say?"
- "Eusha! Eusha!"
- VCR "신화의 토크 타임 No.2"
- "Gonna Be Alright" (괜찮아요)
- "On The Road"
- "The Solver"
- "Run"
- Talk
- "Deep Sorrow"
- "Wedding"
- VCR "신화 창조 이야기"
- "Once In a Lifetime"
- Talk
- "I Pray 4 U"
- "Jam #1"
- Talk
- "Hurts"
- "Venus"
- Ending Ment
- "Brand New"
Beijing, China (7 July 2012)

Set-list: 130 minutes. †=substitute dancer for Jun Jin

- Intro
- "T.O.P"†
- "Hey, Come On"†
- Talk and members' greetings
- "Crazy"
- "Destiny of Love"
- VCR 1 - narrated by Jun Jin
- "Wild Eyes"†
- "Perfect Man"†
- Talk
- "Time Machine"
- "How Do I Say?"
- "Eusha! Eusha!"
- VCR 2 - "Be My Love" MV - features behind-the-scene comeback footage
- "Re-Love"
- "On The Road"
- "Deep Sorrow" (중독)
- "Wedding" (너의 결혼식)†
- VCR 3
- "Once In a Lifetime"
- Talk
- "I Pray 4 U"
- Talk
- "Hurts"
- VCR 4 - "Venus" intro
- "Venus"†
- Talk and birthday song for Lee Min-woo
- "Brand New"

Encore

- "Yo!" (악동보고서)
- "Oh!"
- Talk and thank yours

== Tour dates ==
Date	City	Country	Venue	Attendance
24 March 2012	Seoul	South Korea	Olympic Gymnastics Arena	20,000
25 March 2012	Seoul	South Korea	Olympic Gymnastics Arena	20,000
30 April 2012	Shanghai	China	Shanghai Indoor Stadium	8,000
12 May 2012	Taipei	Taiwan	Nangang Exhibition Hall	—
29 May 2012	Yokohama	Japan	Yokohama Arena	30,000
30 May 2012	Yokohama	Japan	Yokohama Arena	30,000
2 June 2012	Kobe	Japan	World Memorial Hall	30,000
16 June 2012	Singapore		Resorts World Sentosa	5,000
30 June 2012	Guangzhou	China	Guangzhou Gymnasium	8,000
7 July 2012	Beijing	China	Wukesong Arena	8,000
Total				79,000

== Personnel ==
- Vocals / dancer: Shinhwa
- Tour organizer: Shinhwa Company, Open World Entertainment, Top Class Entertainment, Liveworks Company, TOP Media
- Tour promoter: CJ E&M Corp (Seoul)
- Overseas promoter: Open World Entertainment, Star Group (Taiwan), Parallel Smart Media Alpha Ent. (Singapore)

== Media ==
- DVD: 2012 Shinhwa Grand Tour in Seoul "The Return" (released: 26 December 2012)
