= Choi Soo-young =

South Korean singer and actress (born 1990)

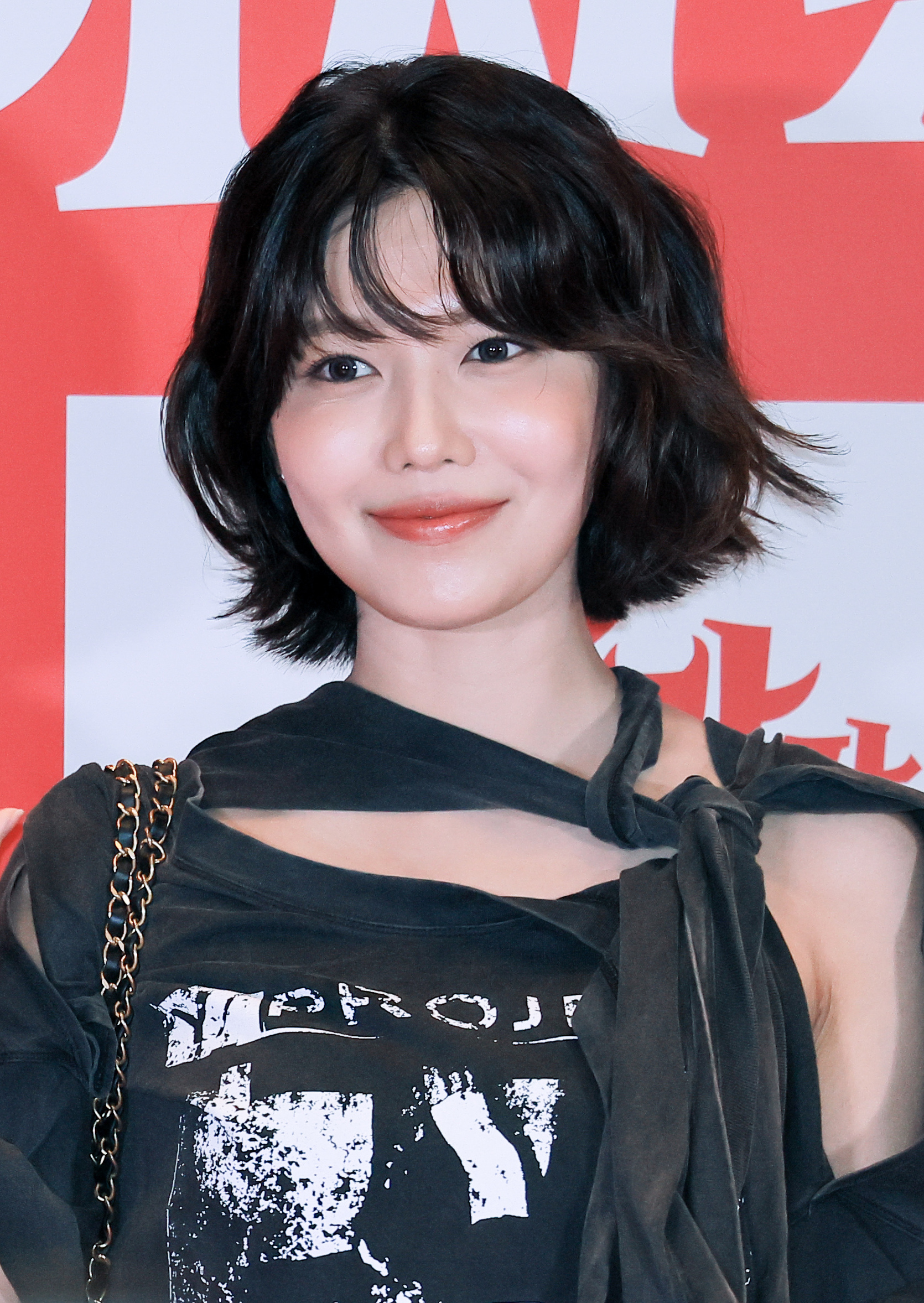
- Choi in August 2025
- Born: February 10, 1990 (age 36); Gwangju, Gyeonggi, South Korea
- Education: Chung-Ang University
- Occupations: Singer; actress; songwriter
- Years active: 2002–present
- Agent: Saram Entertainment
- Family: Choi Soo-jin (sister)
- Musical career
- Genre: K-pop
- Instrument: Vocals
- Labels: SM; Avex Trax
- Member of: Girls' Generation; Girls' Generation-HRS
- Formerly of: Route 0

Korean name
- Hangul: 최수영
- RR: Choe Suyeong
- MR: Ch'oe Suyŏng
- Website: esaram.co.kr Choi Sooyoung

Signature
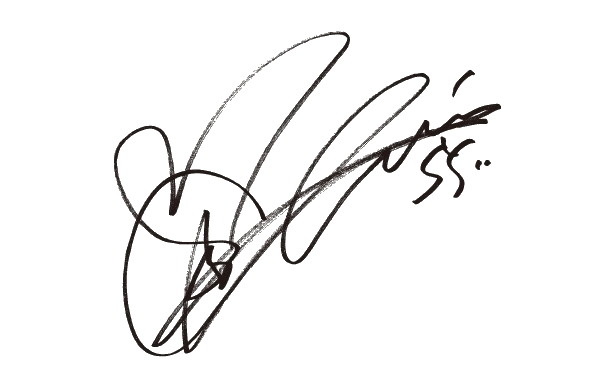

Choi Soo-young (Korean: 최수영; born February 10, 1990), known mononymously as Sooyoung, is a South Korean singer, actress, and songwriter. She was a member of the short-lived Korean-Japanese singing duo Route 0, which debuted in Japan in 2002. After returning to South Korea in 2004, Choi eventually became a member of girl group Girls' Generation in 2007, which went on to become one of the best-selling artists in South Korea and one of South Korea's most widely known girl groups worldwide.

Apart from her group's activities, Choi has also starred in various television dramas such as The Third Hospital (2012), Dating Agency: Cyrano (2013), My Spring Days (2014), Squad 38 (2016), Man in the Kitchen (2017–2018), Tell Me What You Saw (2020), and most recently in Run On (2021), So I Married the Anti-fan (2021), If You Wish Upon Me (2022), Not Others (2023), Second Shot at Love (2025), and I Dol I (2026).

In October 2017, Choi announced that she had left SM Entertainment, although she clarified that she would continue to be a member of Girls' Generation. She joined Echo Global Group and released her first solo single "Winter Breath" in 2018, before moving to Saram Entertainment in 2019. In October 2024, Choi made her solo debut in Japan with the release "Unstoppable", under Japan label Avex Trax.

== Early life and education ==
Choi was born in Gwangju, Gyeonggi, South Korea, on February 10, 1990. She is the younger sister of Choi Soo-jin, who is a musical theatre actress.

Choi graduated from JeongShin Women's High School in 2009. She went on to major in film studies and graduated from Chung-Ang University in February 2016, receiving a lifetime achievement award at the graduation ceremony. Her fellow Girls' Generation member Kwon Yuri attended the same university.

== Life and career ==
=== 2000–2007: Career beginnings ===
Choi was initially discovered through an SM Entertainment Open Audition when she was in fifth grade. She later won first place at the 2002 Korea-Japan Ultra Idol Duo Audition, leading to her debuting in Japan as a member of Route 0. The duo released three singles before ultimately disbanding in 2003.

Choi returned to SM Entertainment and eventually debuted in South Korea as a member of the girl group Girls' Generation in August 2007.

=== 2008–2016: Acting roles and songwriting ===
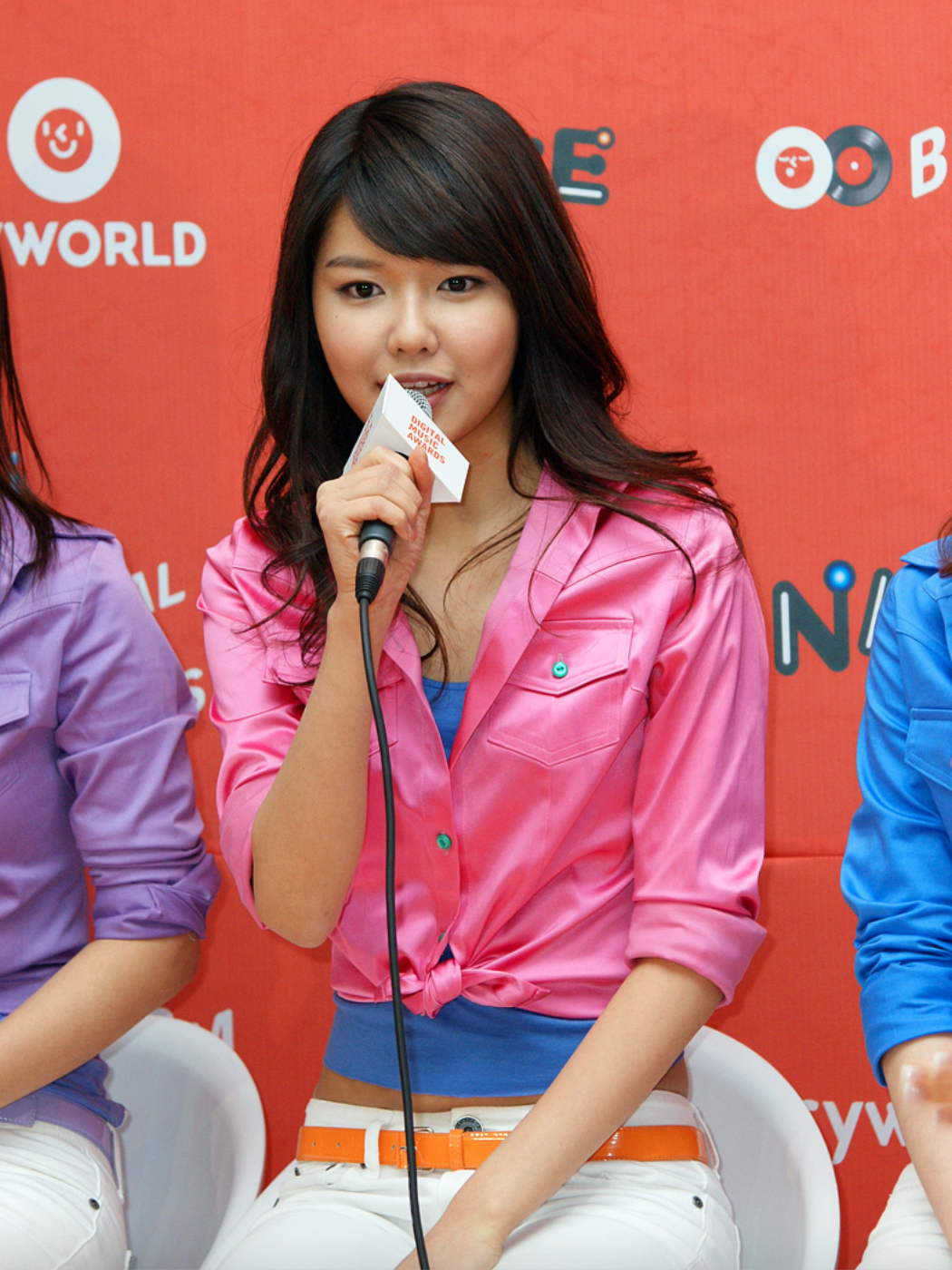
Choi at the 31st Cyworld Digital Music Awards in 2009

Girls' Generation gained significant mainstream popularity with the release of their single "Gee" in 2009. Choi has said in an interview that she was also interested in acting before debuting as a singer, and had failed more than 70 auditions prior to her debut in Girls' Generation.

Aside from Girls' Generation's activities, Choi participated in various music and acting projects. Initially, her acting work mostly involved several small roles and guest appearances, including KBS2's sitcom Unstoppable Marriage (2007), the romantic comedy film Hello, Schoolgirl (2008), SBS's drama Oh! My Lady (2010), SBS's Paradise Ranch (2011) and SBS's A Gentleman's Dignity (2012). During this period, musically, she recorded two songs: one trot song titled "KKok" with Girls' Generation member Yuri for the SBS drama Working Mom, with another, "Feeling Only You", being a collaboration with Girls' Generation member Tiffany and South Korean duo The Blue.

As a member of Girls' Generation, Choi contributed songwriting credits. She penned the lyrics for three Girls' Generation songs: "How Great is Your Love" (2011), "What Do I Do" (2016), and "Sailing (0805)" (2016), while co-writing the song "Baby Maybe" (2013).

In September 2012, she landed her first major acting role in tvN's medical drama The Third Hospital. Her performance was praised by her co-actors Oh Ji Ho and Kim Seung-woo. In May 2013, Choi was cast in tvN's romantic comedy drama, Dating Agency: Cyrano, a spin-off of the 2010 movie Cyrano Agency. Park Ju-yeon from the Hankook Ilbo praised Choi for her lively character portrayal, stating that her performance lacked the "overdone emotions [that] commonly appear in acting newcomers".

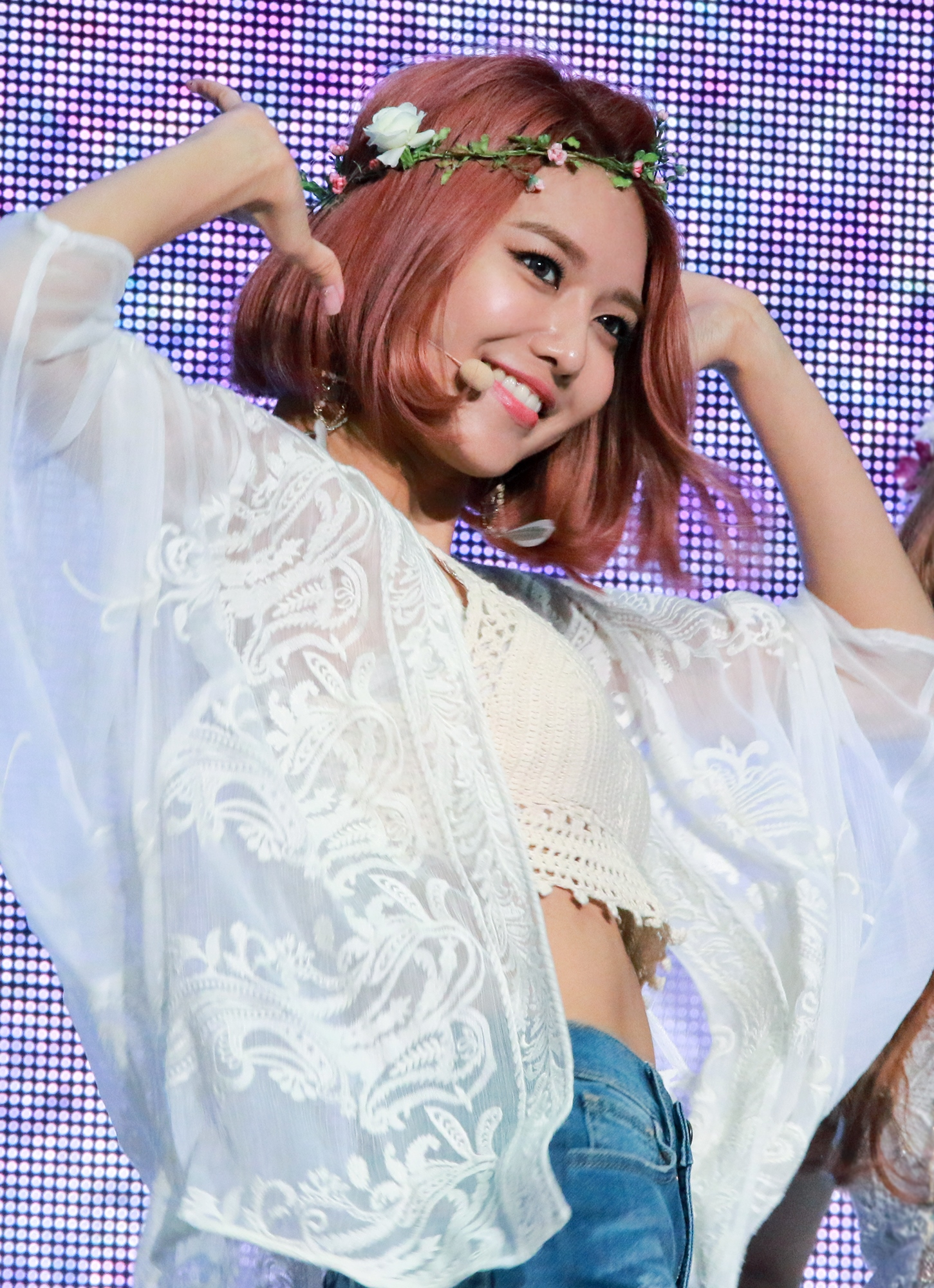
Choi performing in 2015

In September 2014, Choi scored a lead role in MBC's melodrama, My Spring Days, playing a terminally ill patient who receives a heart transplant and meets her donor's husband, played by Kam Woo-sung. For this breakthrough performance, Choi won the "Best Actress in a Miniseries" award at the 2014 MBC Drama Awards and the "Excellence Award for Actress" at the 2015 Korea Drama Awards. She contributed a song to its soundtrack, titled "Wind Flower".

In 2015, Choi starred as the female lead in KBS2's special drama Perfect Sense, which was produced by Samsung Fire & Marine Insurance to help raise public understanding of the disabled. She played a teacher named Ah-yeon who is visually impaired.

In June 2016, Choi starred as the female lead alongside Ma Dong-seok and Seo In-guk in the OCN crime drama Squad 38.

=== 2017–present: Label change and continued acting ===
In early August 2017, Choi starred as a television producer in the JTBC web drama Someone You Might Know. Later in August, she played the female lead in the MBC drama series Man in the Kitchen. In November 2017, Choi joined Echo Global Group after the conclusion of her exclusive contract with SM Entertainment.

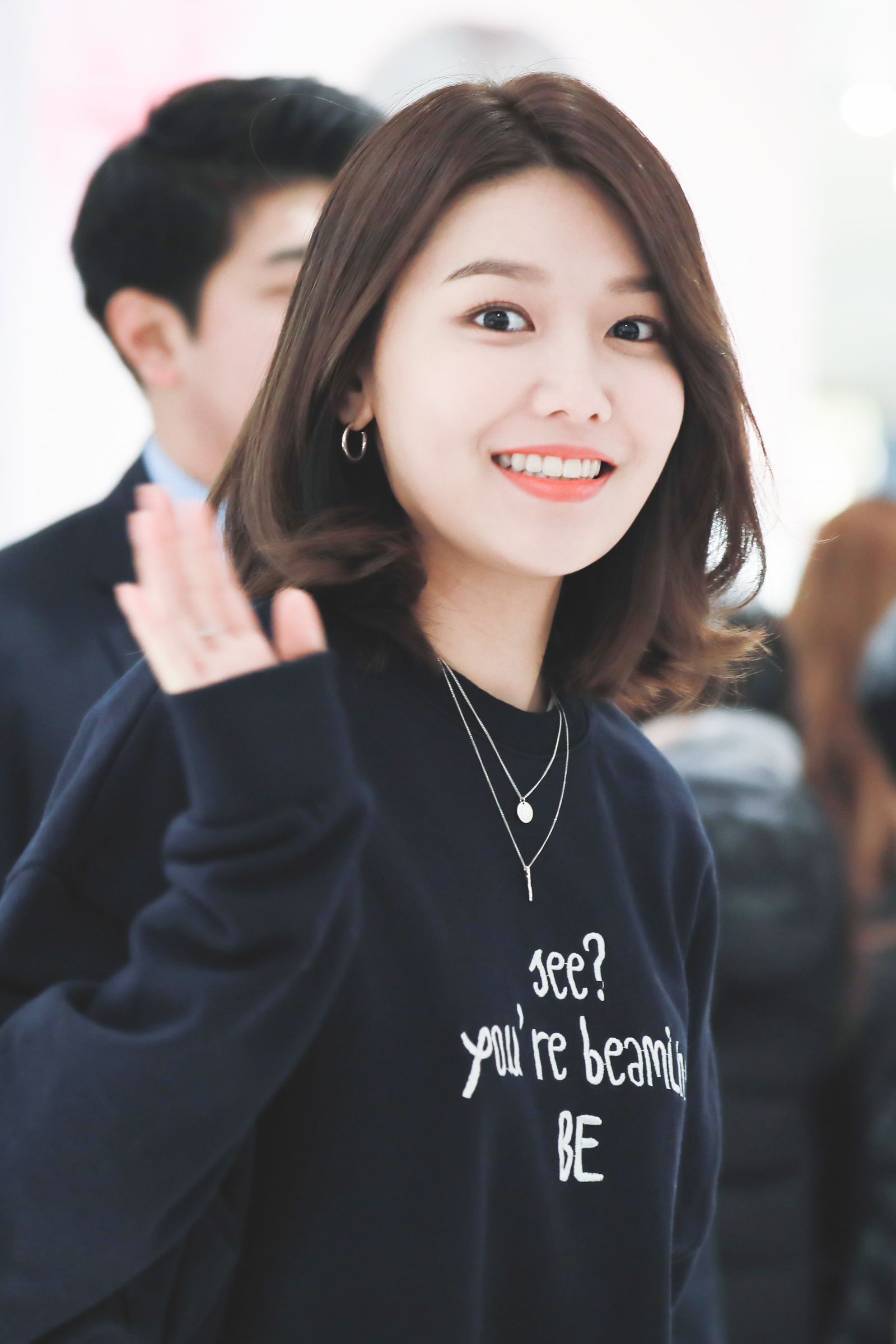
Choi at a "Beaming Effect" event in 2018

In 2018, Choi was cast in the Korean-Japanese film Memories of a Dead End and the action comedy film Miss & Mrs. Cops.

In December 2018, Choi released her solo single, "Winter Breath", which marked her first song release following her departure from SM Entertainment. Choi launched her official Twitter and YouTube accounts to commemorate the single's release.

In May 2019, Choi signed with a new agency, Saram Entertainment. In February 2020, Choi starred in the OCN drama Tell Me What You Saw.

Following the release of Tell Me What You Saw in 2020, Choi starred in the JTBC romance drama Run On. Then in 2021, she starred alongside Choi Tae-joon in the Naver TV romantic comedy series So I Married the Anti-fan, based on the manhwa of the same name and appeared in the Netflix original series Move to Heaven.

In 2022, she starred in the KBS2 drama If You Wish Upon Me in the role of a hospice nurse. Choi participated in Girls' Generation's fifteenth anniversary album Forever 1 (2022), co-writing the songs "Seventeen" and "Villain" for the album.

On August 29, 2024, Saram Entertainment announced that Choi would be releasing her Japanese debut maxi single, titled "Unstoppable", on October 30, 2024.

In 2025, Choi starred opposite Kim Jae-yong in the ENA romance drama I Dol I. She played Maeng Se-na, a lawyer and boy group fangirl.

== Personal life ==
Choi was in a relationship with actor Jung Kyung-ho from 2012 to 2026. She is Christian.

== Philanthropy ==
Choi has engaged in various philanthropic activities. In 2012, she was appointed as ambassador to Korea's Retinitis Pigmentosa Society along with her bandmates Tiffany, Taeyeon and Seohyun. At the end of 2012, she launched a fundraising campaign with cable channel QTV for patients of Retinitis Pigmentosa. Since then, she has continued to serve as ambassador while conducting sponsorship events and supporting research on the disease.

In 2016, Choi launched a clothing brand called Beaming Effect with the aim to raise awareness for Retinitis Pigmentosa. She has held several charity bazaars throughout the years and donated the proceeds towards research for treatment. Notably, she held a funding with Kakao, a charity bazaar and a charity concert featuring various artists in 2017.

Choi has also been appointed ambassador to the Korean Day of Overcoming Rare Diseases, the Social Welfare Council and the National Disability Awareness Improvement Campaign. In 2014, she sponsored the operation cost for an individual with heart disease after playing the role of someone who received a heart transplant through organ donation in her drama My Spring Days.

== Discography ==
=== Korean singles ===
List of Korean singles, showing year released, selected chart positions, and name of the album
Title	Year	Album
As lead artist
"Winter Breath" (겨울숨)	2018	Non-album single
As featured artist
"Feeling Only You" (너만을 느끼며) (The Blue featuring Tiffany and Sooyoung)	2009	The Blue – The First Memories
"Let's Get Away" (Acoustic version) (James Lee featuring Sooyoung)	2018	The Light
Promotional single
"Be Yourself" (너니까 너답게) (featuring Hong Hyun-hee)	2020	Non-album single
Soundtrack appearances
"I Am" (Korean version)	2005	Inuyasha OST
"Kkok" (꼭) (with Kwon Yu-ri)	2008	Working Mom OST
"Wind Flower" (바람꽃)	2014	My Spring Days OST
"To My Star" 나의 별에게	2022	If You Wish Upon Me OST Part 8

=== Japanese singles ===
List of Japanese singles, showing year released, selected chart positions, and name of the album
Title	Year	Peak chart positions		Sales	Album
Title	Year	JPN	JPN Hot	Sales	Album
"Unstoppable" (Note: Unstoppable has 3 b-sides: "C.A.L.M", "Kono sekai ni utsutte iru no wa dare" (この世界に映っているのは誰, Who is reflected in this world?) & "Call me")	2024	26	—	JPN: 2,540	Non-album single

== Ambassadorship ==
- Korea Social Welfare Council Ambassador for sharing (2022)

== Accolades ==
=== Awards and nominations ===
Name of the award ceremony, year presented, category, nominee of the award, and the result of the nomination
Award ceremony	Year	Category	Nominee / Work	Result	Ref.
APAN Star Awards	2023	Excellence Award, Actress in a Short Drama	Fanletter Please	Nominated	
Blue Dragon Film Awards	2019	Best New Actress	Miss & Mrs. Cops	Nominated	
Jecheon International Music & Film Festival	2019	Discovery of the Year Award	Memories of a Dead End	Won	
KBS Drama Awards	2022	Popularity Award, Actress	If You Wish Upon Me	Nominated	
Korea Drama Awards	2013	Best New Actress	Dating Agency: Cyrano	Nominated	
Korea Drama Awards	2015	Excellence Award, Actress	My Spring Days	Won	
Marie Claire Asia Star Awards	2022	Face of Asia Award	If You Wish Upon Me	Won	
MBC Drama Awards	2014	Excellence Award, Actress in a Miniseries	My Spring Days	Won	
MBC Drama Awards	2014	Best Couple Award	My Spring Days	Nominated	
MBC Drama Awards	2017	Top Excellence Award, Actress in a Weekend Drama	Man in the Kitchen	Nominated	
MBC Drama Awards	2022	Excellence Award, Actress in a Daily/One Act Drama	Fanletter Please	Won	
MBC Drama Awards	2022	Best Couple Award	Choi Soo-young (with Yoon Park); Fanletter Please	Nominated	
Mnet 20's Choice Awards	2012	20's Style	Choi Soo-young	Nominated	
SBS Entertainment Awards	2013	New Rookie Award (MC Category)	TV Entertainment Tonight	Won	
Style Icon Awards	2013	Best K-Style Award	Choi Soo-young	Won	

=== Listicles ===
Name of publisher, year listed, name of listicle, and placement
Publisher	Year	Listicle	Placement	Ref.
Korean Film Council	2021	Korean Actors 200 (Note: Introduces 200 actors that best represent the present and future of Korean cinema to the people in the film industry all over the world.)	Included	
